= Grey DeLisle filmography =

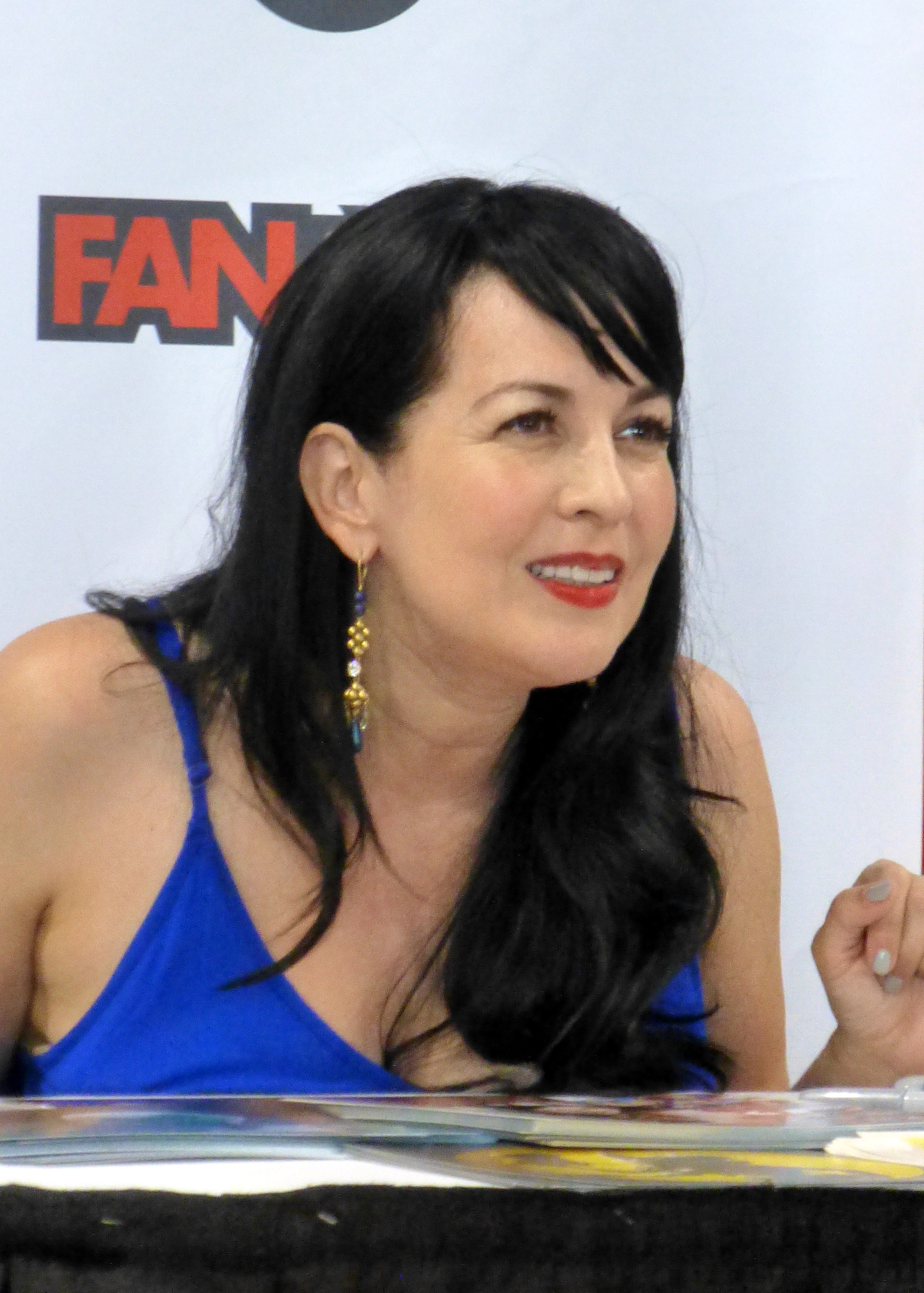
DeLisle in 2015

Grey DeLisle, sometimes credited as Grey Griffin, is known for various roles in animated productions and video games.

== Voice-over roles ==
=== Film ===
List of voice performances in feature, direct-to-video, and television films
Year	Title	Role	Notes	Sources
2001	Scooby-Doo and the Cyber Chase	Daphne Blake, Cyber Daphne Blake		
2001	The Flintstones: On the Rocks	Betty Rubble, Mystery Woman	Direct-to-video	
2002	The Powerpuff Girls Movie	Linda, Woman at Zoo		
2002	Rapsittie Street Kids: Believe in Santa	Jenna	TV film	
2004	Clifford's Really Big Movie	Emily Elizabeth Howard, Caroline Howard		
2004	Scooby-Doo! and the Loch Ness Monster	Daphne Blake, Shannon Blake	Direct-to-video	
2005	Aloha, Scooby-Doo!	Daphne Blake, Auntie Mahina, Local Woman #2	Direct-to-video	
2005	The Legend of Frosty the Snowman	Miss Sharpey, Simon Sklarew, Sullivan Sklarew		
2005	Scooby-Doo! in Where's My Mummy	Daphne Blake, Natasha	Direct-to-video	
2006	Ultimate Avengers	Wasp / Janet Pym		
2006	Ultimate Avengers 2	Wasp / Janet Pym		
2006	Scooby-Doo! Pirates Ahoy!	Daphne Blake	Direct-to-video	
2006	Asterix and the Vikings	Impedimenta		
2006	Codename: Kids Next Door - Operation Z.E.R.O.	Crazy Old Cat Lady, Gramma Stuffum		
2007	Billy & Mandy's Big Boogey Adventure	Mandy, Mandroid, Milkshakes		
2007	Chill Out, Scooby-Doo!	Daphne Blake	Direct-to-video	
2008	The Little Mermaid: Ariel's Beginning	Aquata, Arista		
2008	Wubbzy's Big Movie!	Wubbzy, Kooky Kid, Old Lady		
2008	Scooby-Doo! and the Goblin King	Daphne Blake, Cat Witch, Honeybee	Direct-to-video	
2008	Beverly Hills Chihuahua	Mother Dog	Live-action animal voices	
2008	Underfist: Halloween Bash	Mandy, Aunt Sis		
2008	Dead Space: Downfall	Heather, Donna Fawkes		
2008	Bolt	Penny's Mom		
2008	Destination: Imagination	Frankie Foster, Tiny Friend, Little Boy Voice, Lady, Eurotrish		
2009	Hulk Versus	Sif	Segment: "Hulk vs. Thor"	
2009	Afro Samurai: Resurrection	Tomoe, Ogin	English dub	
2009	Scooby-Doo! and the Samurai Sword	Daphne Blake, Sapphire Sonja	Direct-to-video	
2009	Wow! Wow! Wubbzy!: Wubb Idol	Wubbzy, Sparkle, Kooky Kid, Intercom Voice, Kool Kid #1, Sock Monster, Actress		
2009	Wishology	Vicky, Tooth Fairy		
2009	Transformers: Revenge of the Fallen	Arcee		
2009	Curious George: A Very Monkey Christmas	Betsy, Mrs. Yellow Hat		
2009	Tinker Bell and the Lost Treasure	Lyria, Narrator, Viola		
2010	Scooby-Doo! Abracadabra-Doo	Daphne Blake	Direct-to-video	
2010	Cats & Dogs: The Revenge of Kitty Galore	Security Bulldog, Catherine's Niece, Cat Spy Analyst	Live-action animal voices	
2010	Tom and Jerry Meet Sherlock Holmes	Red		
2010	Scooby-Doo! Camp Scare	Daphne Blake	Direct-to-video	
2010	DC Showcase: Green Arrow	Black Canary	Short film	
2010	Firebreather	Ms. Dreakford		
2011	Green Lantern: Emerald Knights	Ree'Yu		
2011	Tom and Jerry and the Wizard of Oz	Dorothy		
2011	Scooby-Doo! Legend of the Phantosaur	Daphne Blake	Direct-to-video	
2011	Batman: Year One	Barbara Gordon		
2011	Ben 10/Generator Rex: Heroes United	Dr. Holiday		
2012	Justice League: Doom	Lois Lane		
2012	Scooby-Doo! Music of the Vampire	Daphne Blake	Direct-to-video	
2012	Superman vs. The Elite	Young Manchester Black		
2012	Batman: The Dark Knight Returns	Anchor Carla		
2012	Tom and Jerry: Robin Hood and His Merry Mouse	Maid Marian		
2012	Big Top Scooby-Doo!	Daphne Blake	Direct-to-video	
2012	Secret of the Wings	Gliss		
2012	Dino Time	Baby T-Rex		
2013	Scooby-Doo! Mask of the Blue Falcon	Daphne Blake	Direct-to-video	
2013	Scooby-Doo! Adventures: The Mystery Map	Daphne Blake	Direct-to-video	
2013	Justice League: The Flashpoint Paradox	Nora Allen, Young Barry Allen, Martha Wayne		
2013	Tom and Jerry's Giant Adventure	Red Fairy, Mrs. Bradley		
2013	Scooby-Doo! Stage Fright	Daphne Blake, Amy	Direct-to-video	
2013	Lego Marvel Super Heroes: Maximum Overload	Pepper Potts		
2013	Curious George: Swings Into Spring	Besty, Photographer		
2014	JLA Adventures: Trapped in Time	Wonder Woman, Superbaby		
2014	Scooby-Doo! WrestleMania Mystery	Daphne Blake	Direct-to-video	
2014	The Pirate Fairy	MC Fairy, Gliss		
2014	Scooby-Doo! Frankencreepy	Daphne Blake, Mama Mione	Direct-to-video	
2014	Lego DC Comics: Batman Be-Leaguered	Lois Lane, Wonder Woman		
2014	The Book of Life	Grandma Sànchez		
2014	Bayonetta: Bloody Fate	Jeanne	English dub	
2015	Tinker Bell and the Legend of the NeverBeast	Narrator		
2015	The Flintstones & WWE: Stone Age SmackDown!	Betty Rubble		
2015	Batman vs. Robin	Samantha		
2015	Tom and Jerry: Spy Quest	Carol		
2015	Justice League: Gods and Monsters	Tina		
2015	Scooby-Doo! Moon Monster Madness	Daphne Blake	Direct-to-video	
2015	Scooby-Doo! and Kiss: Rock and Roll Mystery	Daphne Blake	Direct-to-video	
2015	Lego DC Comics Super Heroes: Justice League – Attack of the Legion of Doom	Wonder Woman, Lois Lane		
2015	When Marnie Was There	Setsu Oiwa	BTVA Award for Best Female Supporting Vocal Performance in an Anime Movie/Special	
2015	Marvel's Super Hero Adventures: Frost Fight	Captain Marvel		
2016	Lego DC Comics Super Heroes: Justice League – Cosmic Clash	Wonder Woman		
2016	Lego Scooby-Doo! Haunted Hollywood	Daphne Blake	Direct-to-video	
2016	Tom and Jerry: Back to Oz	Dorothy		
2016	Lego DC Comics Super Heroes: Justice League – Gotham City Breakout	Wonder Woman		
2016	Scooby-Doo! and WWE: Curse of the Speed Demon	Daphne Blake	Direct-to-video	
2017	Scooby-Doo! Shaggy's Showdown	Daphne Blake	Direct-to-video	
2017	Lego Scooby-Doo! Blowout Beach Bash	Daphne Blake, Ghost of Bingo Bell	Direct-to-video	
2017	Lego DC Super Hero Girls: Brain Drain	Wonder Woman, Lois Lane		
2018	Scooby-Doo! & Batman: The Brave and the Bold	Daphne Blake, Blake Canary	Direct-to-video	
2018	Batman: Gotham by Gaslight	Sister Leslie		
2018	Lego DC Comics Super Heroes: The Flash	Wonder Woman, Lois Lane		
2018	Batman Ninja	Catwoman / Selina Kyle	English dub of anime	
2018	Lego DC Super Hero Girls: Super-Villain High	Wonder Woman, Lois Lane		
2018	Lego DC Comics Super Heroes: Aquaman – Rage of Atlantis	Wonder Woman, Lois Lane, Power Ring		
2018	Scooby-Doo! and the Gourmet Ghost	Daphne Blake, Rocky	Direct-to-video	
2018	Bumblebee	Arcee		
2019	Scooby-Doo! and the Curse of the 13th Ghost	Daphne Blake	Direct-to-video	
2019	Teen Titans Go! vs. Teen Titans	Mrs. Claus, Bank Teller		
2019	Frozen II	Additional voices	Credited as Grey DeLisle-Griffin	
2019	Scooby-Doo! Return to Zombie Island	Daphne Blake	Direct-to-video	
2020	Bobbleheads: The Movie	Rosa, Bella, TV Research Woman		
2020	Onward	Dewdrop		
2020	Mortal Kombat Legends: Scorpion's Revenge	Kitana, Satoshi Hasashi		
2020	Lego DC Shazam! Magic and Monsters	Wonder Woman		
2020	Happy Halloween, Scooby-Doo!	Daphne Blake	Direct-to-video	
2021	Batman: Soul of the Dragon	Lady Eve		
2021	Scooby-Doo! The Sword and the Scoob	Daphne Blake, Morgan le Fay, Mrs. Wendy Wentworth, Dragon	Direct-to-video	
2021	The Mitchells vs. the Machines	Stagehand		
2021	Trollhunters: Rise of the Titans	Additional voices		
2021	The Loud House Movie	Lana Loud, Lola Loud, Lily Loud, Scoots		
2021	Mortal Kombat Legends: Battle of the Realms	Kitana, Satoshi Hasashi, Li Mei		
2021	Straight Outta Nowhere: Scooby-Doo! Meets Courage the Cowardly Dog	Daphne Blake, Frau Glockenspiel	Direct-to-video	
2022	Constantine: The House of Mystery	Beelzebub, Little Della, Little Jack		
2022	Teen Titans Go! & DC Super Hero Girls: Mayhem in the Multiverse	Wonder Woman, Giganta		
2022	Luck	Mrs. Rivera, Saoirse, Penny Depot Boss, Additional Voices		
2022	Trick or Treat Scooby-Doo!	Daphne Blake, Daisy, Musketeer #1, Olive	Direct-to-video	
2023	Scooby-Doo! and Krypto, Too!	Daphne Blake, Wonder Woman, Giganta	Direct-to-video	
2023	Mortal Kombat Legends: Cage Match	Kia, Little Boy, Old Lady	Direct-to-video	
2024	No Time to Spy: A Loud House Movie	Lola Loud, Lana Loud, Lily Loud	TV film	
2024	Saving Bikini Bottom: The Sandy Cheeks Movie	Ma Cheeks, Granny Cheeks, Rowdy Cheeks, Rosie Cheeks		
2024	Watchmen Chapter 1	Spanish Newscaster, Female Civilian #2	Direct-to-video	
2024	Watchmen Chapter 2	Female Citizen #1, Advisor #1	Direct-to-video	
2024	Thelma the Unicorn	Bridget		
2025	Fixed	Nana		
2025	A Loud House Christmas Movie: Naughty or Nice	Lola Loud, Lana Loud, Lily Loud, Cheryl Farrell, Meryl Farrell, Scoots		
2025	A Chuck E. Cheese Christmas	Bella Brinca, Mrs. Brinca, Pedestrian		
2025	The SpongeBob Movie: Search for SquarePants	Mean Girl, Harp Fish		
2025	Diary of a Wimpy Kid: The Last Straw	Organ Lady		
2025	Gabby's Dollhouse: The Movie	Spatula		

=== Animation ===
List of voice performances in animation
Year	Series	Role	Notes	Sources
1996–2003	Rugrats	Todd McNulty, Ty McNulty, Terry McNulty, Reptar Jr., Dulce, Dulce's Mother, Lloyd		
1997–2004	Johnny Bravo	Various voices		
1998	Oh Yeah! Cartoons	Various		
1999	The Wild Thornberrys	Gazelle #2	Episode: "Stick Your Neck Out"	
1999	The Cartoon Cartoon Show	Ashley, Cat, Nadine's Mom	2 episodes	
2000–04	The Weekenders	Lorraine "Lor" McQuarrie, Cheri, Nona, Delivery Woman, Lois, Carlotta, Reporter, Undine, Helen, Reporter (2), Dr. Presto, Lor's Mom, Dougovina		
2000	Buzz Lightyear of Star Command	Several characters		
2000–03	Clifford the Big Red Dog	Emily Elizabeth Howard, Caroline Howard		
2000–05	The Powerpuff Girls	Various voices		
2001–02	The Zeta Project	Andrea Donoso, Dominique, Newscaster, Female Cop		
2001–02	Grim & Evil	Mandy, Major Dr. Ghastly		
2001–02	Crayon Shin-chan	Cosmo, Miss Uma	Vitello English dub	
2001–17	The Fairly OddParents	Vicky, various voices	Credited as Grey Griffin in seasons 9–10	
2001–03	The Mummy	Evy O'Connell		
2001–04, 2017	Samurai Jack	Various voices	Credited as Grey Griffin in Season 5	
2001–07	Harvey Birdman, Attorney at Law	Debbie, Female Juror, Daphne Blake, Dr. Gale Melody, Bobby, Super Kid, Spider Kid, Mary Volcanus, Mary, HR Woman, Receptionist, X's Wife, DMV Operator, Cosmetician, Woman, Clerk, Movie Clerk,		
2002	House of Mouse	Roxanne		
2002	The New Woody Woodpecker Show	La Luna		
2002–03	Whatever Happened to... Robot Jones?	Shannon Westerberg, Mom Unit, Mrs. Waverly		
2002–06	What's New, Scooby-Doo?	Daphne Blake, various voices		
2002–04	Fillmore!	Mrs. Waverly, Mrs. Lawson, Nick's Mother		
2002–08	Codename: Kids Next Door	Laura Limpin, Grandma Stuffum, Crazy Old Cat Lady, Mega Mom, Soccer Mom, Were-Dog Valerie, Eizzil Enived, Lizzie Devine, Various KND Operatives		
2003	Free for All	Sally, Claudia	Episodes: "Sterile Angus" and "Hostage Johnny"	
2003–08	The Grim Adventures of Billy & Mandy	Mandy, various voices		
2003–04	Evil Con Carne	Major Doctor Ghastly, Mom, Mother Monkey, Computer		
2003–09	My Life as a Teenage Robot	Letta, Lenny, Exo-Skin, others	6 episodes	
2003–05	Duck Dodgers	Skye Falling, Computer, Newswoman Shye Falling, Catapoid, Vampire Bride #1, Vampire Bride #2, Boodikka, Nina, Beautiful Reporter, Food Synthesizer, Lady Zorga, The Monstress, Massage Girl		
2003–05	Star Wars: Clone Wars	Padmé Amidala, Asajj Ventress, Shaak Ti, Adi Gallia, Nelvaanian Woman, Nelvaanian Child		
2003–06	Clifford's Puppy Days	Emily Elizabeth Howard, Caroline Howard		
2003–06	Xiaolin Showdown	Kimiko Tohomiko, Evil Doll, Betie, Dyris, Singing Old Lady, Omi Mom		
2004	Dave the Barbarian	Vermite Queen, Cackline, Deena, Troll Girl		
2004	Jimmy Timmy Power Hour	Vicky, Principal Waxelplax	Television film	
2004	Justice League Unlimited	Shifter, Downpour	Episode: "Ultimatum"	
2004–07	Danny Phantom	Samantha "Sam" Manson, various voices		
2004–05	Megas XLR	Alien Girl 1, Teacher, Old Woman in Line		
2004–09	Foster's Home for Imaginary Friends	Frankie Foster, various voices		
2004–08	The Batman	Vulture / Amber, Mary Grayson, Ms. Vimtrup, Amanda Raymont		
2004–06	Hi Hi Puffy AmiYumi	Yumi, various voices		
2004–06	The Adventures of Jimmy Neutron: Boy Genius	Various voices		
2005–06	W.I.T.C.H.	Miranda		
2005–06	Danger Rangers	Kitty the Cat, Kate, Penguin, Fabiola, Child, Kwan, Mom (1), Jack (2), Bobby (2), Queen, Jackie, Jodie, Teacher (2), Mom (3)		
2005–07	Loonatics Unleashed	Apocazons		
2005	Rugrats Pre-School Daze	Dulce		
2005–08	My Gym Partner's a Monkey	Lupe Toucan, Ingrid Giraffe, Mrs. Winifred Warthog, Nurse Gazelle, Aloysius Elephant		
2005–08	Avatar: The Last Airbender	Princess Azula, Michi, Kya, Actress Katara, Ta Min, Banished Servant Girl		
2005–08	Ben 10	Xylene, Camille Mann, Mrs. Mann		
2006–07	Shorty McShorts' Shorts	Additional voices		
2006–09	The Replacements	Riley, Buzz Winters, Lady Lady		
2006–10	Wow! Wow! Wubbzy!	Wubbzy, Buggy, Madame Zabinga, Kooky Kid, Old Lady, Miss Bookfinder, Baby Goo Goo, Growlygus, Sparkle, Intercom Voice, Kool Kid #1, Sock Monster, Actress		
2006–12	Handy Manny	Flicker, Lily		
2007	Afro Samurai	Oyuki, Woman		
2007–08	El Tigre: The Adventures of Manny Rivera	Frida Suárez, various voices		
2007–11	Back at the Barnyard	Juanita, Woman, Hanna, Hen #2, Veronica, Cheerleaders, Inga, Bronco Betsy, Prunella, Bachelorette 1, Bachelorette 3, Beverly		
2008–09	The Spectacular Spider-Man	Betty Brant, Sally Avril, Erin, Stephanie Briggs, Oscorp Security Voice		
2008–11	The Mighty B!	Portia Gibbons, Millie Millerson, Emily, Chai Gallagher, Madam Valeska, Lola Millerson, Geoffrey, Maude, Ronnie, K.G. Bianca, Mona		
2008–11	Batman: The Brave and the Bold	Black Canary, Fire, Bat Manga Robin, Dala, Daphne Blake, Golden Age Black Canary		
2008–10	The Marvelous Misadventures of Flapjack	Ms. Leading, Flirtatious Lady, Gertrude, Tickled Lady, Big Woman, Dr. Proctor, Ms. Leading, Peter, Woman, Old Lady (2), Old Woman (2), Woman (2), Frida		
2008–15	WordGirl	Beatrice Bixby/Lady Redundant Woman, Ms. Question, Mrs. Ripley, additional voices		
2009–13	The Garfield Show	Jack Allwork, Nathan (seasons 2–4), Nathan's Mother, Sandra, Miss Kitty Litter, various voices		
2009–11	The Super Hero Squad Show	Ms. Marvel, Volcana, Frigga, Enchantress		
2009	Wolverine and the X-Men	Spiral, Sarah Vale (Network), Psylocke, Mrs. Pare, Worthington Commercial		
2009	G.I. Joe: Resolute	Scarlett, Baroness, Dial Tone, Cover Girl		
2009–13	The Penguins of Madagascar	Darla, Female Baboon, Mother, Possum Kid		
2010	The Cartoonstitute	Girl, Alastair, Mom	2 episodes	
2010	Regular Show	Desdemona, various voices		
2010	Fish Hooks	Baby Unicorn	Episode: "The Tale of Sir Oscar Fish"	
2010–12	Kick Buttowski: Suburban Daredevil	Brianna Buttowski, additional voices		
2010–13	Scooby-Doo! Mystery Incorporated	Daphne Blake, various voices		
2010–13	Generator Rex	Dr. Rebecca Holiday, various voices		
2010–13	Mad	Sam Puckett, Megan Fox, Demi Lovato, Taylor Swift, Angelina Jolie, JWoww, Princess Ariel, Lt. Uhura, Rachel Berry, Mary Jane, Flounder, Dowager, Black Widow, Lois Lane, Alligator, Dr. Remy "Thirteen" Hadley, Sarah Walker, Snow White, Misty, Christopher Robin, Lilly Truscott, Gabriella Montez, Velma Dinkley, Dexter, Catwoman, Lofty, Blue Beetle, Boots the Monkey, Tigress, Soothsayer, Ursula, Gloria, Susan Pevensie, White Witch, Neil Downe, Charlie Brown, Dolly, Lara Lor-Van, Jane Foster, Tuffy, Jean Grey, Mystique		
2010–17	Uncle Grandpa	Little Judy Jones, Mrs. Numty, Young Priscilla Jones, Tommy, Josie, Giant Realistic Flying Tiger, Waitress, Jimmy, Little Mac, Melvin's Babysitter, additional voices	Credited as Grey DeLisle-Griffin	
2010–15	T.U.F.F. Puppy	Kitty Katswell, various voices		
2010–13, 2019, 2021–22	Young Justice	Dreamer, Whisper A'Daire, Troia, Helga Jace, Big Barda, Ana Von Furth / Plasma, Josefine Tarkov, Don Allen, Lois Lane, Gaby Gabrielli, Maria Garcia, Lia Briggs, Norman's Mother, Jon Kent	25 episodes	
2011	Dan Vs.	Hortence		
2011	ThunderCats	Young Cheetara		
2011	Kung Fu Panda: Legends of Awesomeness	Jao, Liang, Goat		
2011–14	The Looney Tunes Show	Lola's Mom / Patricia, Carol, Miss Prissy, Mama Bear, various voices		
2011–14	Winx Club (Nickelodeon revival)	Griffin, Queen Niobe, Tecna's Guardian of Sirenix, Queen Luna, Queen Marion, Nebula		
2012	Super Best Friends Forever	Wonder Girl		
2012	Special Agent Oso	Flicker		
2012	The Avengers: Earth's Mightiest Heroes	Betty Brant		
2012–13	Pound Puppies	Shaggles, Dot, Teen Boys' Mom, Tabitha, Katy, Pet Owner, Buttercup, Mrs. Wyszikowski, TV Jingle, Puddles, Lillian, Millard, Dot, Yo Yo, Axel, Mom, Ponytail Girl		
2012–13	Green Lantern: The Animated Series	Aya, Queen Aga'Po, Lady Catherine, Amala Rev, Biara Rev, Bleez, Alana, Thila		
2012–13	Kaijudo	Master Nadia Lobachevsky, Alakshmi Verma, Janet Pierce Okamoto, Moorna, Razorkinder, Maribel, Cyber Lord Crolie, Kimiko, Nobu, Ichiro		
2012–13	Gravity Falls	Mrs. Gleeful, various voices		
2012–15	Randy Cunningham: 9th Grade Ninja	Flute Girl, Ms. Wickwhacker		
2013–15	Henry Hugglemonster	Gertie Growlerstein, Estelle Enormomonster, Nan-Oh Hugglemonster, Roberto Snifflemonster, Meg Munderclaw, Matilda Munderclaw, Hildegard Howoooolermonster, Roy and Kelly Snifflemonster	Credited as Grey DeLisle-Griffin	
2013–16	Sanjay and Craig	Sandy, various voices		
2013–16	Turbo Fast	Burn, Deuce, Mama Guana, Jennie, Becky, Snap, Female Squirrel, Mama Toad, Newscaster, Female Driver, Female Fan, Young Girl, Bramber, Flavia, Female Kissing Teen		
2013–14	Ultimate Spider-Man	Tana Nile, Morgan le Fay		
2013–14	Brickleberry	Chastity, Astral, Grandmama, Tammy		
2013–14	Beware the Batman	Magpie		
2013	Epic Rage Time: The Incredible Derp	Derpy Hooves		
2013	The Legend of Korra	Ming-Hua, Dark Scorpion Spirit, Spirit Mushroom, Kuon's Wife, young Lin Beifong, Dark Spirit, Lilly	Season 2 Credited as Grey DeLisle-Griffin or Grey Griffin	
2013	Hulk and the Agents of S.M.A.S.H.	Moloid Shaman, Mother, Mia		
2014	The Boondocks	Elderly Woman, Kardashia Kardashian, Loyal White Woman, Mother Maria, Siri, Additional Voices	Season 4, 5 episodes Credited as Grey DeLisle-Griffin	
2014	Wander Over Yonder	Olive, additional voices	Episode: "The Nice Guy/The Time Bomb"	
2014	Lego DC Comics: Batman Be-Leaguered	Wonder Woman, Lois Lane	Consistently credited as Grey Griffin from here until 2022	
2014–21	The Tom and Jerry Show	Ginger, Winston's Owner, Beatrice, Drone		
2014–22	Robot Chicken	Lois Lane, Mary Darling, Daphne Blake, Blanche Devereaux	4 episodes	
2015	The 7D	Princess Prettyhead	Episode: "7 Frogs"	
2015	Sofia the First	Opal, Ellegra, additional voices		
2015	Pig Goat Banana Cricket	Sleeping Kid		
2015–18	The Adventures of Puss in Boots	Vina, Sphinx, The Duchess, various voices		
2015–18	Be Cool, Scooby-Doo!	Daphne Blake, various voices		
2015–18	Pickle and Peanut	Queen Carney, Charlie, Sloppy Mama, Additional Voices		
2015–19	Star vs. the Forces of Evil	Queen Moon Butterfly, Jackie Lynn Thomas, various voices		
2015–19	Guardians of the Galaxy	Mistle, Captain Marvel		
2015–16	Miles from Tomorrowland	Stella, various voices		
2015–16	Scooby-Doo! Lego Shorts	Daphne Blake		
2015–16	The Mr. Peabody & Sherman Show	Cleopatra, Mary Anning, Eunice Butters		
2015–16	Star Wars Rebels	Darja, Oora, Chava		
2015–17	Dawn of the Croods	Sandy, Lerk, Pat, Trixie, Frump, Rad, Handsy, Not Food, Teena, Monkhuahua, Crabby Tabbies, Fangster, Sheetah, Bearette, Gran Bear Owl		
2016	Transformers: Robots in Disguise	Glowstrike		
2016–18	Bunnicula	Madame Polidori, Lady on TV		
2016, 2020	New Looney Tunes	Vera Vulture, Millicent	Episodes: "Fwee Wange Wabbit" and "The Magnificent Millicent"	
2016–present	The Loud House	Lana Loud, Lola Loud, Lily Loud, various voices	Credited as Grey Griffin in seasons 1–6	
2016–17	Lego Star Wars: The Freemaker Adventures	Naare, Automated Voice, Young Anakin, Eye Stalk, Maz Kanata, Baby Wampa		
2016–19	The Powerpuff Girls	Deb O'Nair, Janitor		
2016–19	Avengers Assemble	Carol Danvers / Captain Marvel, Morgan le Fay		
2016–20	Elena of Avalor	Dr. Mendoza, Ash Delgado, Gabriela, Damon's Mother, Baby Isabel		
2017–23	Puppy Dog Pals	Bonnie, Sallie, Nelly, Sweetie, Funny Bunny, Dr. G, Jean, Sam's Mom, Mama Squirrel, Marge, Mrs. Claus, Haven, Edith, Wiggles, Additional voices		
2017–20	Unikitty!	Prince Puppycorn, various voices		
2017–20	Spider-Man	Black Cat, Monica Rappaccini / Scientist Supreme, Captain Marvel		
2018	Supernatural	Daphne Blake	Voice; episode: "Scoobynatural"	
2018	Justice League Action	Navigational System	Episode: "Barehanded"	
2018	Legend of the Three Caballeros	Xandra, various voices		
2018–20	Harvey Girls Forever!	Lucretia, various voices		
2018–20	DuckTales	Mann, Sowvanna		
2018–20	She-Ra and the Princesses of Power	Madame Razz, General, Horde Tough, Old Storyteller, Baker, Villager, Bright Moon Guard, Grox	Recurring roles, credited as Grey Griffin	
2018–present	Big City Greens	Additional Voices, Vuka		
2018–21	Paradise PD	Mayor Karen Crawford, various voices		
2019	Pinky Malinky	Dizzy, Byron, Zeek, Suzie	Recurring roles, credited as Grey Griffin	
2019–20	Tigtone	Zuviell, Lady Centaur, Not Centaur, Queen Bee, Sound Monster, Villager 1, Villager 3		
2019–21	DC Super Hero Girls	Wonder Woman, Giganta, Lois Lane, British Reporter		
2019–21	Scooby-Doo and Guess Who?	Daphne Blake, various voices		
2019–21	Bless the Harts	Ashleigh, Mee-Maw Edwards		
2019–21	Teen Titans Go!	Wonder Woman, Daphne Blake	3 episodes	
2019–present	The Simpsons	Martin Prince, Sherri and Terri	Recast role, voices all characters of Russi Taylor after her death, credited as Grey Griffin in seasons 31–33	
2019–22	DreamWorks Dragons: Rescue Riders	Marena, Mrs. Borgomon	Recurring roles	
2020–23	The Owl House	Katya, Masha, additional voices	17 episodes, credited as Grey Griffin in season 1 & most of season 2	
2020	Kipo and the Age of Wonderbeasts	Kwat, Mrs. Sartori, Cotton, Glam Rock Hamster, Lemieux, Alpha Mom, Loretta, Megan, Camille		
2020	Animaniacs	Brie	Episode: "Pinko and the Brain", credited as Grey Griffin	
2020	The Casagrandes	Lana Loud, Lola Loud, Lily Loud	Episode: "Cursed!"	
2020–22	It's Pony	Henrietta, Kid 2, Kid 3, Barbara, Bella		
2021–22	Kid Cosmic	Carla, Ramona, Head Huntress, Grathla, Military Woman 1, Violet Vanish		
2021–22	He-Man and the Masters of the Universe	Evil-Lyn, Evelyn, Mo'squita-ra	24 episodes, credited as Grey Griffen	
2021	Devil May Care	Coma, additional voices	Recurring role	
2021	Yabba Dabba Dinosaurs	Betty Rubble	13 episodes, credited as Grey Griffen	
2021–present	Invincible	Monster Girl, Shrinking Rae, Olga, Betsy Wilkins, Polly, Thula, Justine		
2021–24	The Ghost and Molly McGee	Joanie Pataky, Lucretia, Cleopatra, Sobgoblins, Deb	21 episodes, credited as Grey Griffin in season 1	
2022	Star Trek: Prodigy	DaiMon Nandi	2 episodes, credited as Grey Griffin	
2022	The Cuphead Show!	Ms. Chalice, Dorris	15 episodes, credited as Grey Griffin in season 1	
2022	The Boys	Two Birds	2 episodes, credited as Grey Griffin	
2022–26	The Legend of Vox Machina	Delilah Briarwood, Lady Johanna von Musel de Rolo	Credited as Grey Griffin	
2022–23	Pantheon	Zhong Shuchun	7 episodes, credited as Grey Griffin	
2023	Unicorn: Warriors Eternal	June Way, Clarice Leydoux, Original Melinda		
2023–present	Pupstruction	Maya	Recurring, credited as Grey Griffin	
2024	Masters of the Universe: Revolution	Despara	Episode: "The Scepter and the Sword"	
2024	The Fairly OddParents: A New Wish	Bev, Mrs. Amy Krentz, Mrs. Velasquez, The Pe-Az, Vicky, The Tooth Fairy	Recurring	
2024–25	Hot Wheels Let's Race	Dash Wheeler		
2024–25	Sausage Party: Foodtopia	Carrot, Pear, Food 1, Goat Cheese, Can of Corn 2, Broken Freezer Food, Katy Perrier, Celery, Whole Milk, Red Lentils, Yolk-O, Egg, Raisin, Rice	16 episodes	
2024–present	Batman: Caped Crusader	Julie Madison, additional voices		
2025	Goldie	Mrs. Petunia		
2025	Jellystone!	Mandy, Frankie Foster	Episode: "Crisis on Infinite Mirths"	
2025–present	King of the Hill	Luke Jr., Girl Scout, Amber, additional voices		
2026	Helluva Shorts	Secretary, TV Reporter	Episode: "Mission: Big Boss"	
2026	Chibiverse	Redd	Episode: "Pirates of the Chibibbean"	
2026	President Curtis	Orla O'Doyle	Episode: "Knox"	

=== Video games ===
List of voice performances in video games
Year	Series	Role	Notes	Source
1999	Star Wars Episode I: The Phantom Menace	Padmé, Gungan Child		
1999	Indiana Jones and the Infernal Machine	Nubian Boy		
2000	Star Wars Episode I: Jedi Power Battles	Queen Amidala, Handmaiden		
2000	Baldur's Gate II: Shadows of Amn	Viconia, Nalia		
2000	Clifford the Big Red Dog: Thinking Adventures	Emily Elizabeth Howard		
2000	Clifford the Big Red Dog: Learning Activities	Emily Elizabeth Howard, Mrs. Carrington, Lily LaValley		
2000	Scooby-Doo!: Phantom of the Knight	Daphne Blake		
2000	Scooby Doo! Showdown in Ghost Town	Daphne Blake		
2001	Star Wars: Super Bombad Racing	Queen Amidala		
2001	Star Wars Rogue Squadron II: Rogue Leader	Karie Neth		
2001	Star Wars: Obi-Wan	Asha, Train Station Announcer, Female Citizen #1		
2001	Scooby-Doo: Activity Challenge	Daphne Blake		
2001	Scooby Doo! Jinx at the Sphinx	Daphne Blake		
2002	Scooby-Doo! Night of 100 Frights	Daphne Blake, Holly Graham		
2002	Scooby-Doo! The Glowing Bug Man	Daphne Blake		
2002	Run Like Hell	Amanda		
2002	Star Wars: The Clone Wars	Amidala, Bera Kazan		
2003	Arc the Lad: Twilight of the Spirits	Lilia		
2003	Star Wars: Knights of the Old Republic	Sarna, Lena, Cassandra Mateil		
2003	Star Wars Jedi Knight: Jedi Academy	Alora, Jedi Female		
2003	True Crime: Streets of LA	Jill, Lola, additional voices		
2003	The Fairly OddParents: Breakin' da Rules	Vicky, Tootie, Spatula Woman, Créme Puffs, Nicky		
2003	Final Fantasy X-2	Pukutak		
2003	Nickelodeon Toon Twister 3-D	Vicky		
2003	Clifford the Big Red Dog: Phonics	Emily Elizabeth Howard		
2003	Scooby-Doo! The Scary Stone Dragon	Daphne Blake		
2004	Scooby-Doo! Mystery Mayhem	Daphne Blake, Selena Drake, Mindi Stiles, Shermantech Scientist, Actress		
2004	Doom 3	Computer, Theresa Chasar		
2004	X-Men Legends	Mystique, Child Bishop		
2004	Vampire: The Masquerade – Bloodlines	Jeanette Voerman/Therese Voerman		
2004	Star Wars: Knights of the Old Republic II – The Sith Lords	Brianna, the Handmaiden		
2004	The Adventures of Jimmy Neutron Boy Genius: Attack of the Twonkies	Greystar Lead		
2005	Robots	Piper Pinwheeler, Cappy, Additional voices		
2005	Doom 3: Resurrection of Evil	Computer		
2005	Scooby-Doo! Unmasked	Daphne Blake, Marcy		
2005	X-Men Legends II: Rise of Apocalypse	Mystique		
2005	Codename: Kids Next Door - Operation: V.I.D.E.O.G.A.M.E.	Grandma Stuffums		
2006	Nicktoons: Battle for Volcano Island	Sam Manson		
2006	Xiaolin Showdown	Kimiko		
2006	Happy Feet	Miss Viola, Mrs. Astrakhan, Young Penguins, Adult Penguins		
2006	X-Men: The Official Game	Jason Stryker (young)		
2006	Avatar: The Last Airbender	Azula		
2006	The Grim Adventures of Billy & Mandy	Mandy		
2006	Scooby-Doo: Frights! Camera! Mystery!	Daphne Blake		
2006	Scooby-Doo! Who's Watching Who?	Daphne Blake, Professor Alicia Wayne, Maggie Sinclair		
2007	Tomb Raider: Anniversary	Natla		
2007	Nicktoons: Attack of the Toybots	Sam Manson		
2007	Mass Effect	Nassana Dantius, Marie Durand, others		
2007	Avatar: The Last Airbender – The Burning Earth	Azula		
2008	Avatar: The Last Airbender – Into the Inferno	Azula		
2008	Tomb Raider: Underworld	Natla		
2009	Ninja Gaiden Sigma 2	Elizébet		
2009	G.I. Joe: The Rise of Cobra	Baroness		
2009	Bayonetta	Jeanne, Jubileus		
2009	FusionFall	Mandy, Frankie Foster		
2010	Dragon Age: Origins – Awakening	Velanna		
2010	Metal Gear Solid: Peace Walker	Amanda Valenciano Libre		
2010	StarCraft II: Wings of Liberty	Nova		
2010	Clash of the Titans	Io, Narrator, Stygian Witches – Deino, Medusa		
2010	Marvel Super Hero Squad: The Infinity Gauntlet	Enchantress, Black Widow		
2011	Knights Contract	Holda, Verderine		
2011	Nicktoons MLB	Kitty Katswell		
2011	Batman: Arkham City	Catwoman, Vicki Vale		
2011	Cartoon Network: Punch Time Explosion	Blossom, Mac, Mandy		
2011	Generator Rex: Agent of Providence	Dr. Holiday		
2011	Star Wars: The Old Republic	Bounty Hunter Female		
2012	Armored Core V	Rosary, Computer Voice 3		
2012	PlayStation All-Stars Battle Royale	Carmelita Fox, Hannah, Female Golfer		
2012	Diablo III	Wizard – Female		
2013	Sly Cooper: Thieves in Time	Carmelita Fox, Blimp Computer Voice		
2013	StarCraft II: Heart of the Swarm	Nova		
2013	Injustice: Gods Among Us	Catwoman		
2013	Far Cry 3: Blood Dragon	Dr. Elizabeth Veronica Darling		
2013	Armored Core: Verdict Day	CPU Voice		
2013	Batman: Arkham Origins Blackgate	Catwoman		
2014	Broken Age	Levina, Drucilla, Yarn Pet #3		
2014	Bayonetta 2	Jeanne, Newscaster		
2015	Infinite Crisis	Catwoman		
2015	Mortal Kombat X	Kitana	Dialogue voiced by Karen Strassman	
2015	Heroes of the Storm	Nova, Li-Ming		
2015	Batman: Arkham Knight	Catwoman, Vicki Vale	Listed as Voiceover and Mocap Talent	
2015	Minecraft: Story Mode	Ellegaard the Redstone Engineer		
2015	Lego Dimensions	Daphne Blake, Catwoman, Phyllis	Grouped under "Voiceover Talent"	
2017	Injustice 2	Catwoman, Alura In-Ze		
2017	Marvel vs. Capcom: Infinite	Captain Marvel		
2019	Marvel Dimension of Heroes	Captain Marvel	Augmented reality game for mobile devices	
2020	Samurai Jack: Battle Through Time	Flora, Josephine Clench		
2021	DC Super Hero Girls: Teen Power	Wonder Woman / Diana Prince, Giganta / Doris Zeul, Lois Lane		
2022	Bayonetta 3	Jeanne		
2023	Nickelodeon All-Star Brawl 2	Frida Suárez		
2025	Date Everything!	Tina		
2025	Nicktoons & The Dice of Destiny	Vicky		
2025	Fortnite Battle Royale	Computer Voice, Pretzel		
2026	Invincible VS	Monster Girl (Amanda), Thula		

=== Theme parks ===
List of voice performances in Amusement parks
Year	Title	Role	Notes	Sources
2012	Marvel Super Heroes 4D	Computer		

=== Web series ===
List of voice performances in web series
Year	Series	Role	Notes	Source
2019, 2023	Ollie & Scoops	Julia Goldburger, Nurse		
2026	Chuck E. Cheese Minisodes	Bella Brinca, Mrs. Brinca	It contains 6 PartyMobile Sing-Along videos, 5 Staring Contest videos, The Easy Dance video and 2 various music videos including "Robot Banana Christmas" and "What Would We Do Without Christmas?" from "A Chuck E. Cheese Christmas" (2025).	
2026	Strawberry Vampire	Hedda	Episode: "Bat Franny"	

=== Audio books ===
List of voice performances in audio books
Year	Series	Role	Notes	Source
2024	Critical Role: Bells Hells - What Doesn't Break	Delilah Briarwood		

== Live-action roles ==
List of appearances in film and television
Year	Title	Role	Notes	Source
1999	That '70s Show	Ms. Kaminsky	Episode: "Prom Night"	
2002	A Wedding Story	Herself	Episode covers her wedding to Murry Hammond of Old 97's.	
2013	I Know That Voice	Herself	Documentary	

== Book sources ==
- Beck, Jerry (2005). The Animated Movie Guide. Chicago Review Press. 386pp. ISBN 9781569762226.
- Brooks, Tim; Marsh, Earle F. (2009). The Complete Directory to Prime Time Network and Cable TV Shows 1946–Present (9th ed.). Random House Publishing Group. ISBN 9780307483201.
- Terrace, Vincent (2008). Encyclopedia of Television Shows, 1925 through 2010 (2d ed.). McFarland. ISBN 9780786486410.
- Perlmutter, David (2014). America Toons In: A History of Television Animation. McFarland. ISBN 9781476614885.
