= List of Scooby-Doo media =

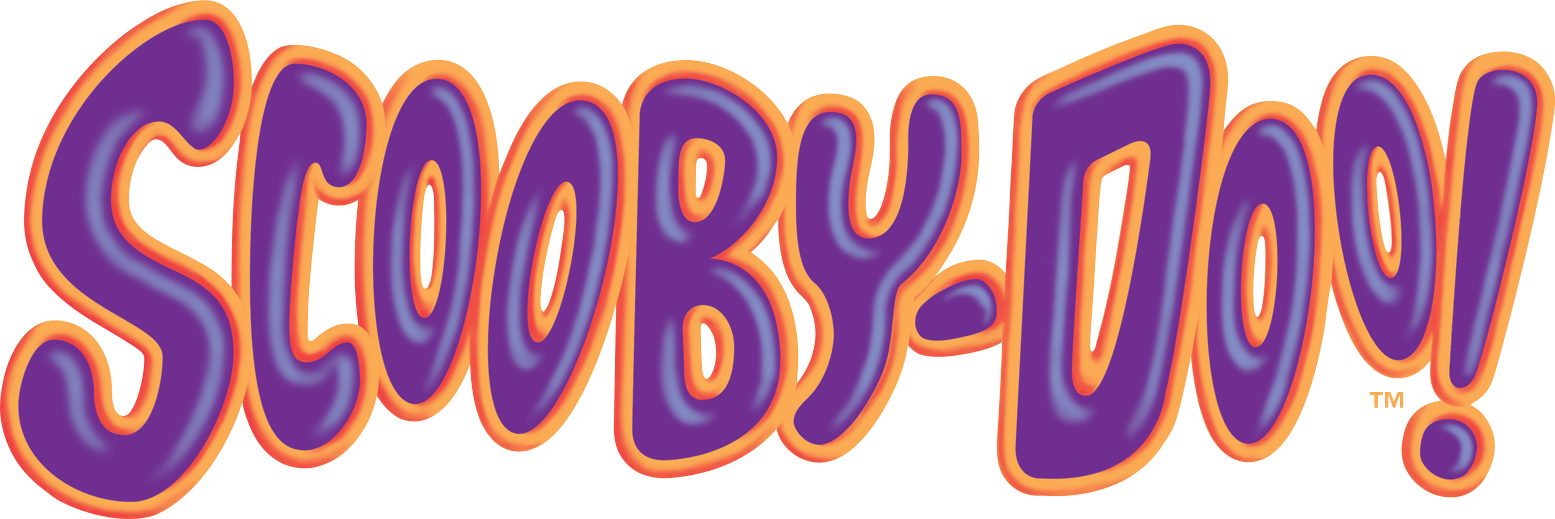
- Franchise logo since 1997
- Original work: Scooby-Doo, Where Are You!

Print publications
- Comics: 15

Films and television
- Films: 45
- Short film: 46
- Television series: 13
- Web series: 1
- Animated series: 15
- Television specials: 7
- Television shorts: 8
- Television film: 6
- Direct-to-video: 39

Theatrical presentations
- Plays: 6

Games
- Video games: 20

The following is a list of the various media from the Scooby-Doo franchise, including TV series and specials, films, shorts, video games, comic books, and theatrical productions.

== Television ==
=== Animated series ===
Broadcast run	Title	Original channel	Episodes	Seasons
1969–1970	Scooby-Doo, Where Are You! (Note: In 1978, Scooby's All-Stars originally aired the first nine of its 16 new episodes under the Scooby-Doo, Where Are You! moniker. That batch of nine episodes is frequently now listed as a third season (sometimes including all 16 All-Stars episodes). The batching of these "shared" episodes is variable dependent on source.)	CBS/ABC	41 episodes	3
1972–1973	The New Scooby-Doo Movies	CBS	24 episodes	2
1976–1978	The Scooby-Doo Show (Note: Aired as part of The Scooby-Doo/Dynomutt Hour (1976), The Scooby-Doo/Dynomutt Show (1976–77), Scooby's All-Star Laff-A-Lympics (1977–78), and Scooby's All-Stars (1978–79). Nine of the 16 new Scooby episodes from Scooby's All-Stars originally aired under the Scooby-Doo, Where Are You! banner, although they were repackaged and aired as part of Scooby's All-Stars for the rest of 1978 alongside the other eight new 1978 Scooby-Doo episodes. The 1976–78 Scooby-Doo episodes are now broadcast under the title The Scooby-Doo Show. The 16 episodes were released by Warner Home Video on DVD in their syndicated versions with The Scooby-Doo Show opening titles as Scooby-Doo! Where Are You?: The Complete Third Season.)	ABC	40 episodes	3
1979–1980	Scooby-Doo and Scrappy-Doo	ABC	16 episodes	1
1980–1982	Scooby-Doo and Scrappy-Doo (Note: Aired as part of The Richie Rich/Scooby-Doo Show (1980–82) and The Scooby-Doo/Scrappy-Doo/Puppy Hour (1982–83). The Scooby-Doo episodes from these years are now broadcast under the Scooby-Doo and Scrappy-Doo title, distinguished from the 30-minute 1979 episodes of the show by a slightly different opening credits sequence. Repackaged segments from The Richie Rich/Scooby-Doo Show aired under the title Scary Scooby Funnies as a mid-season replacement in 1984.)	ABC	33 episodes (99 segments)	3
1983–1984	The New Scooby and Scrappy-Doo Show (Note: Retitled The New Scooby-Doo Mysteries for its second season (1984–85). Episodes from this and the previous Scrappy incarnations from 1980 onward were repackaged as Scooby's Mystery Funhouse in 1985.)	ABC	26 episodes (44 segments)	2
1985	The 13 Ghosts of Scooby-Doo	ABC	13 episodes	1
1988–1991	A Pup Named Scooby-Doo	ABC	27 episodes (30 segments)	4
2002–2006	What's New, Scooby-Doo?	The WB (Kids' WB)	42 episodes	3
2006–2008	Shaggy & Scooby-Doo Get a Clue!	The CW (Kids' WB)	26 episodes	2
2010–2013	Scooby-Doo! Mystery Incorporated	Cartoon Network	52 episodes	2
2015–2018	Be Cool, Scooby-Doo!	Cartoon Network / Boomerang	52 episodes (53 segments)	2
2019–2021	Scooby-Doo and Guess Who?	Boomerang / HBO Max	52 episodes	2
2023–2024	Velma (Note: For adult-oriented.)	HBO Max (Note: Known as Max from May 2023 to July 2025)	21 episodes	2
TBA	Yokoso Scooby-Doo!	Tubi TV	TBA	TBA

=== Live-action series ===
Broadcast run	Title	Original channel	Episodes	Seasons	Status
2027	Scooby-Doo: Origins	Netflix	8	TBA	Filming

=== Appearances in other series ===
Airdate	Episode	Series
September 11, 1976	"Everyone Hyde!"	Dynomutt, Dog Wonder
September 18, 1976	"What Now, Lowbrow?"	Dynomutt, Dog Wonder
November 13, 1976	"The Wizard of Ooze"	Dynomutt, Dog Wonder
1977-1979	24 episodes	Laff-A-Lympics
July 21, 1997	"Bravo Dooby-Doo"	Johnny Bravo
July 7, 2002	"Shaggy Busted"	Harvey Birdman, Attorney at Law
November 1, 2002	"Sabrina Unplugged"	Sabrina the Teenage Witch
February 4, 2005	"Surf the Stars"	Duck Dodgers
June 26, 2005	"A Scooby Friday"	Robot Chicken
October 7, 2005	"Reap Walking"	The Grim Adventures of Billy & Mandy
January 13, 2006	"Keeper of the Reaper"	The Grim Adventures of Billy & Mandy
October 28, 2007	Laff-A-Munich"	Robot Chicken
December 7, 2008	"Cultivated Relationships"	Robot Chicken
April 1, 2011	"Bat-Mite Presents: Batman's Strangest Cases!"	Batman: The Brave and the Bold
May 30, 2011	"TwiGH School Musical"	Mad
October 24, 2011	"Kitchen Nightmares Before Christmas / How I Met Your Mummy" (sketches)	Mad
November 28, 2011	"Spy vs. Spy Kids"	Mad
July 30, 2012	"The Mixed Martial Artist"	Mad
September 30, 2012	"Mystery Not Incorporated"	Robot Chicken
August 12, 2013	"Downton Shaggy"	Mad
October 21, 2013	"Doraline / Monster Mashville" (sketches)	Mad
November 15, 2015	"Abandoned Places"	Robot Chicken
January 7, 2018	"Honest Scooby-Doo"	Robot Chicken
March 29, 2018	"Scoobynatural"	Supernatural
June 24, 2018	"Man Plans, God Laughs"	Robot Chicken
October 21, 2018	"Monster Party"	OK K.O.! Let's Be Heroes
November 29, 2018	"The Trial of Dick Dastardly"	Wacky Races
October 4, 2019	"Cartoon Feud"	Teen Titans Go!
October 20, 2019	"The Breast Cancer Case"	Robot Chicken
October 21, 2019	"Double Trouble"	Wacky Races
September 21, 2021	"Velmas's New Benefit"	Robot Chicken
March 21, 2022	"Scooby-Doo Catchphrases"	Robot Chicken
September 23, 2023	"Intro"	Teen Titans Go!
October 14, 2023	"Warner Bros. 100th Anniversary"	Teen Titans Go!
February 22, 2024	"Frankenhooky"	Jellystone!
May 25, 2025	"Crisis on Infinite Mirths"	Jellystone!
June 21, 2025	"Favorite Animated Show Nominee"	Teen Titans Go!

== Films ==
=== Animated television films ===
Airdate	Title
October 18, 1987	Scooby-Doo Meets the Boo Brothers
October 16, 1988	Scooby-Doo and the Ghoul School
November 13, 1988	Scooby-Doo! and the Reluctant Werewolf
September 3, 1994	Scooby-Doo! in Arabian Nights

=== Direct-to-video animated films ===
Release date	Title
September 22, 1998	Scooby-Doo on Zombie Island
October 5, 1999	Scooby-Doo! and the Witch's Ghost
October 3, 2000	Scooby-Doo and the Alien Invaders
October 9, 2001	Scooby-Doo and the Cyber Chase
March 4, 2003	Scooby-Doo! and the Legend of the Vampire
September 30, 2003	Scooby-Doo! and the Monster of Mexico
June 22, 2004	Scooby-Doo! and the Loch Ness Monster
February 8, 2005	Aloha, Scooby-Doo!
December 13, 2005	Scooby-Doo! in Where's My Mummy?
September 19, 2006	Scooby-Doo! Pirates Ahoy!
September 4, 2007	Chill Out, Scooby-Doo!
September 23, 2008	Scooby-Doo! and the Goblin King
April 7, 2009	Scooby-Doo! and the Samurai Sword
February 16, 2010	Scooby-Doo! Abracadabra-Doo
September 14, 2010	Scooby-Doo! Camp Scare
September 6, 2011	Scooby-Doo! Legend of the Phantosaur
March 13, 2012	Scooby-Doo! Music of the Vampire
October 9, 2012	Big Top Scooby-Doo!
February 26, 2013	Scooby-Doo! Mask of the Blue Falcon
July 23, 2013	Scooby-Doo! Adventures: The Mystery Map
August 20, 2013	Scooby-Doo! Stage Fright
March 25, 2014	Scooby-Doo! WrestleMania Mystery
August 19, 2014	Scooby-Doo! Frankencreepy
February 17, 2015	Scooby-Doo! Moon Monster Madness
July 21, 2015	Scooby-Doo! and Kiss: Rock and Roll Mystery
May 10, 2016	Lego Scooby-Doo! Haunted Hollywood
August 9, 2016	Scooby-Doo! and WWE: Curse of the Speed Demon
February 14, 2017	Scooby-Doo! Shaggy's Showdown
July 25, 2017	Lego Scooby-Doo! Blowout Beach Bash
January 9, 2018	Scooby-Doo! & Batman: The Brave and the Bold
September 11, 2018	Scooby-Doo! and the Gourmet Ghost
February 5, 2019	Scooby-Doo! and the Curse of the 13th Ghost
October 1, 2019	Scooby-Doo! Return to Zombie Island
October 6, 2020	Happy Halloween, Scooby-Doo!
February 23, 2021	Scooby-Doo! The Sword and the Scoob
September 14, 2021	Straight Outta Nowhere: Scooby-Doo! Meets Courage the Cowardly Dog
October 18, 2022	Trick or Treat Scooby-Doo!
September 26, 2023	Scooby-Doo! and Krypto, Too!

=== Animated theatrical films ===
Release date	Title
May 15, 2020	Scoob! (Note: Released digitally in the United States and Canada through video on demand due to the COVID-19 pandemic. Theatrical release in select countries.)

=== Live-action theatrical films ===
Release date	Title
June 14, 2002	Scooby-Doo
March 26, 2004	Scooby-Doo 2: Monsters Unleashed

=== Live-action television films ===
Airdate	Title
September 13, 2009	Scooby-Doo! The Mystery Begins
October 16, 2010	Scooby-Doo! Curse of the Lake Monster

=== Direct-to-video live-action films ===
Release date	Title
May 22, 2018	Daphne & Velma

== Specials ==
=== Television specials ===
Airdate	Title
December 23, 1979	Scooby Goes Hollywood
October 31, 1999	The Scooby-Doo Project
October 31, 2001	Night of the Living Doo
November 25, 2015	Lego Scooby-Doo! Knight Time Terror
October 29, 2021	Scooby-Doo, Where Are You Now!
October 3, 2024	Velma: This Halloween Needs To Be More Special!

=== Direct-to-video specials ===
Release date	Title	Released on
July 17, 2012	Scooby-Doo! Spooky Games	Scooby-Doo! Laff-a-Lympics: Spooky Games
October 16, 2012	Scooby-Doo! Haunted Holidays	13 Spooky Tales: Holiday Chills and Thrills
September 10, 2013	Scooby-Doo! and the Spooky Scarecrow	13 Spooky Tales: Run for Your 'Rife!
September 24, 2013	Scooby-Doo! Mecha Mutt Menace	13 Spooky Tales: Ruh-Roh Robot
May 13, 2014	Scooby-Doo! Ghastly Goals	13 Spooky Tales: Field of Screams
May 5, 2015	Scooby-Doo! and the Beach Beastie	13 Spooky Tales: Surf's Up Scooby-Doo

== Shorts ==
=== Television shorts ===
Airdate	Series	Episodes
October 24, 1998	Those Meddling Kids (Note: Released on video as Scooby-Doo: Behind the Scenes.)	1. "How They Got Started"; 2. "That Meddling Dog, Scooby-Doo"; 3. "That Meddling Hippie, Shaggy"; 4. "That Meddling Kid, Daphne"; 5. "Velma, That Meddling Brain"; 6. "Fred and That Meddling Ascot"; 7. "Those Finger-Pointing Villains"; 8. "Those Meddling Kids, Together Again"
October 2000	Scooby-Doo/Courage the Cowardly Dog (Note: Aired in 16 parts during the Scooby-Doo/Courage the Cowardly Dog Scare-a-Thon.)	

=== Direct-to-video shorts ===
Release date	Title	Included on
February 8, 2005	"An Evening with the Scooby-Doo Gang"	Aloha, Scooby-Doo!
March 22, 2005	"The Hanna-Barbera Kennel Club Roasts Scooby-Doo"	The Best of The New Scooby-Doo Movies

=== Web shorts ===
Release date	Title	Notes
July 30, 2015	Scooby-Doo and the Tag-Sale Clue	Lego Scooby-Doo stop motion series
August 11, 2015	Donuts Save the Day	Lego Scooby-Doo stop motion series
August 19, 2015	Doorway Debacle	Lego Scooby-Doo stop motion series
August 26, 2015	Ghoul on Wheels	Lego Scooby-Doo stop motion series
September 2, 2015	The Getaway	Lego Scooby-Doo stop motion series
September 9, 2015	Creaky Creep Out	Lego Scooby-Doo stop motion series
September 15, 2015	Impossible Imposters	Lego Scooby-Doo stop motion series
October 21, 2015	Trick and Treat	Lego Scooby-Doo stop motion series
March 8, 2016	Mystery Machine Mash-Up	Lego Scooby-Doo stop motion series
March 15, 2016	Lighthouse Lunch Break (Note: Alternatively titled Mid Chase Hotdog Break.)	Lego Scooby-Doo stop motion series
March 22, 2016	Scary Sleepover	Lego Scooby-Doo stop motion series
March 29, 2016 (Note: Nice Ride was first uploaded on September 18, 2015, but was quickly removed. It was put back online on March 29, 2016.)	Nice Ride	Lego Scooby-Doo stop motion series
April 5, 2016	If You Build It, Pizza Will Come	Lego Scooby-Doo stop motion series
April 12, 2016	Mummy Museum Mystery	Lego Scooby-Doo stop motion series
April 19, 2016	Danger Prone Daphne	Lego Scooby-Doo stop motion series
April 26, 2016	Wicked Warehouse Pursuit	Lego Scooby-Doo stop motion series
January 25, 2018	The Case of the Scooby Snack Specter	Scooby-Doo! Mystery Cases stop motion series
February 1, 2018	The Case of the Swamp Picnic Showdown	Scooby-Doo! Mystery Cases stop motion series
February 1, 2018	The Case of the Speed Vampire	Scooby-Doo! Mystery Cases stop motion series
February 15, 2018	The Case of the Monster Birthday	Scooby-Doo! Mystery Cases stop motion series
March 1, 2018	The Case of the Party Mayhem	Scooby-Doo! Mystery Cases stop motion series
March 1, 2018	The Case of the Ghost In The Theater	Scooby-Doo! Mystery Cases stop motion series
September 29, 2018	The Case of the Bad Science Ghost	Scooby-Doo! Mystery Cases stop motion series
October 5, 2018	The Case of the Vanishing Van	Scooby-Doo! Mystery Cases stop motion series
October 12, 2018	The Case of the Beach Pirate Bonanza	Scooby-Doo! Mystery Cases stop motion series
October 19, 2018	The Case of the Very Spooky Cave	Scooby-Doo! Mystery Cases stop motion series
October 19, 2018	What's Mine Is Yours	Scooby-Doo! Mini-Mysteries stop motion series
October 26, 2018	The Case of the Monster Mansion	Scooby-Doo! Mystery Cases stop motion series
November 2, 2018	The Case of the Gift Grabber	Scooby-Doo! Mystery Cases stop motion series
November 9, 2018	The Case of the Problematic Pumpkin Pie	Scooby-Doo! Mystery Cases stop motion series
February 15, 2019	Ice to Meet You	Scooby-Doo! Mini-Mysteries stop motion series
April 5, 2019	Cotton Candy Chaos	Scooby-Doo! Mini-Mysteries stop motion series
August 23, 2019	Beware the Barbecue Bash	Scooby-Doo! Mini-Mysteries stop motion series
January 24, 2020	Big Screen	Scooby-Doo! Playmobil Mini Mysteries stop motion series
January 31, 2020	The Line Up	Scooby-Doo! Playmobil Mini Mysteries stop motion series

== Comic books ==
=== Ongoing and limited series ===
Date	Title	Publisher	Issues	Notes
1970–75	Scooby Doo... Where Are You!	Gold Key Comics	30	This comic series initially contained adaptations of episodes of the Where Are You! television show. The series later moved on to include all-original stories under the name Scooby Doo... Mystery Comics, until it ended with its 30th issue.
1975–76	Scooby-Doo... Where Are You!	Charlton Comics	11	
1977–79	Scooby-Doo	Marvel Comics	9	Stories in this series had preludes published in Marvel's six-issue run of Dynomutt as backups.
1977-78	Dynomutt	Marvel Comics	6	Every issue contained a back-up story featuring Scooby-Doo and Mystery Inc., which served as a prelude for a story in the Scooby-Doo comic.
1978–79	Laff-a-Lympics	Marvel Comics	13	Based on the Hanna-Barbera crossover series of the same name.
1995–97	Scooby Doo	Archie Comics	21	
1997–10	Scooby-Doo!	DC Comics	159	Superseded by Scooby-Doo, Where Are You? Issues 1–30 were collected in six digest-sized paperbacks.
2004–06	Scooby-Doo! World of Mystery	De Agostini	100	In each issue of this magazine, Mystery Inc. go from country to country solving mysteries. Each issue came with a pack of exclusive cards, with 350 cards in total.
2010-25	Scooby-Doo, Where Are You?	DC Comics	132	
2013–19	Scooby-Doo! Team-Up	DC Comics	50 (print)	This series features Mystery Inc. teaming up with a new guest character(s) each issue, including DC and Hanna-Barbera properties such as Batman, Wonder Woman, and The Flintstones, among others. Each print issue collects two digital issues. Issues 1–37 were collected in seven trade paperbacks.
2016–19	Scooby Apocalypse	DC Comics	36	This series reimagines Mystery Inc. in a gritty post-apocalyptic world. It is part of the Hanna-Barbera Beyond brand of comics.
2020	Scooby-Doo! Mystery Inc.	DC Comics	3	
2021–25	The Batman & Scooby-Doo Mysteries	DC Comics	36	Consists of six volumes of twelve issues each. Each print issue collects two digital issues.

=== One-shots ===
Date	Title	Publisher	Notes
1999	Scooby-Doo! Mystery of the Fun Park Phantom	DC Comics	One-shot based on the 1999 PC game of the same name.
2000	Scooby-Doo! The Mystery Card Game Caper	DC Comics	A nine-page "mini-comic" released as a tie-in for the Scooby-Doo! Expandable Card Game.
2019	Scooby-Doo 50th Anniversary Giant	DC Comics	Part of DC's short-lived, print-only 100-Page Giant line. Includes three new stories and three reprints each from DC's 1997 and 2010 series.

=== Reprints ===
Date	Title	Publisher	Issues	Notes
1992–93	Scooby-Doo	Harvey Comics	3	These issues are composed of reprints of the 1975 Charlton series.
1992–93	Scooby-Doo Giant Size	Harvey Comics	2	These issues are composed of reprints of the 1975 Charlton series.
1992–93	Scooby-Doo Big Book	Harvey Comics	2	These issues are composed of reprints of the 1975 Charlton series.
2002	Scooby-Doo	DC Comics	1	Distributed at Burger King. Reprinted three stories from the then-current Scooby-Doo series: "Surf's Up, Monster's Down!" (#24), "Witch Pitch" (#37), and "How I Spent My Winter Break" (#4).
2020	Scooby-Doo! Mystery Inc.	DC Comics	3	Published digitally only; part of DC's Digital First line. Reprinted the three new stories from Scooby-Doo 50th Anniversary Giant.

=== Appearances in other series ===
Date	Story	Series and issue	Publisher	Notes
1971	"Spooky Wooky"	March of Comics #356	Western Publishing	Reprinted in #391, 1974.
1972	"Ghost Town Jitters"	March of Comics #368	Western Publishing	
1973	"The Magic Museum Mystery"	March of Comics #382	Western Publishing	
1978	"Phantasma Gloria"	The Funtastic World of Hanna-Barbera: Yogi's Easter Parade #2	Marvel Comics	This story is a team-up between Mystery Inc. and Blue Falcon and Dynomutt.
1978	"The Man Who Stole Thursday"	The Funtastic World of Hanna-Barbera: The Flintstones visit the Laff-A-Lympics #3	Marvel Comics	This story features the cast of Laff-A-Lympics, along with all members of Mystery Inc.
1993	"Monster of a Time"	Hanna-Barbera Presents All New Comics	Harvey Comics	One-shot featuring Scooby-Doo and other Hanna-Barbera characters. The Scooby-Doo story was reprinted in Archie Comics' Scooby-Doo issue 1.
1995	"The Pizza Delivery from Beyond!" / "Daphne Has Risen from the Grave!"	Hanna-Barbera Presents #5	Archie Comics	Features the A Pup Named Scooby-Doo incarnation of Mystery Inc.
1996	"Too Much Christmas Spirit"	Cartoon Network Christmas Spectacular	Archie Comics	A holiday one-shot featuring Scooby-Doo and other Cartoon Network characters.
1997-99	"Puppy Power!"	Cartoon Network Presents #24	DC Comics	Features Scrappy-Doo in his only solo adventure to date.
2002	"Pickle Party"	Cartoon Network Magazine	Scholastic	A crossover story featuring Scooby-Doo and the Powerpuff Girls.
2004	"Mummy Scares Best"	Kids' WB! JPA: Jam-Packed Action	DC Comics	One-shot featuring the Kids' WB morning line-up. The Scooby-Doo story is an adaptation of the What's New, Scooby-Doo? episode of the same name.

== Filmstrips ==
Date	Title
1978	The Great Grammar Hunt (3 parts) Unit 1: Parts of Speech; Unit 2: Phrases and Clauses; Unit 3: Sentences
1978	Scooby-Doo Locates the Locus
1978	Black Explorers (2 parts) Part 1: Matthew Henson, Black Explorer; Part 2: James Beckwourth, Black Explorer
1978	The Signs of the Times
1978	Let's Go to Press (4 parts) Part 1: A Background; Part 2: News Reporting; Part 3: Features and Editorials; Part 4: Editing and Printing
1979	Help Wanted (2 parts) Part 1: Résumé - The Foot in the Door; Part 2: Interviewing and Applications
1980	Skin Deep (2 parts) Part 1: What is Acne? Part 2: Toward Clearer Skin

== Video games ==
Date	Title	Publisher(s)	Developer(s)	Platform(s)
1983	Scooby-Doo's Maze Chase	Mattel Electronics		Intellivision
1986	Scooby-Doo	Elite Systems	Gargoyle Games	ZX Spectrum; Commodore 64
1991	Scooby-Doo and Scrappy-Doo	Hi-Tec Software	PAL Developments	Amiga; Amstrad CPC; Atari ST; Commodore 64; ZX Spectrum
1995	Scooby-Doo Mystery	Sunsoft; Acclaim Entertainment	Illusions Gaming Company	Sega Genesis
1995	Scooby-Doo Mystery	Sunsoft; Acclaim Entertainment	Argonaut Software	Super Nintendo Entertainment System
1999	Scooby-Doo! Mystery of the Fun Park Phantom	SouthPeak Games	Engineering Animation, Inc.	Microsoft Windows
2000	Scooby-Doo! Mystery Adventures: 1. Showdown in Ghost Town; 2. Phantom of the Knight; 3. Jinx at the Sphinx	The Learning Company	TerraGlyph Interactive Studios	Microsoft Windows
2000	Scooby-Doo! Classic Creep Capers	THQ	TerraGlyph Interactive Studios	Nintendo 64
2001	Scooby-Doo! Classic Creep Capers	THQ	Digital Eclipse	Game Boy Color
2001	Scooby-Doo and the Cyber Chase	THQ	Art Co., Ltd	PlayStation
2001	Scooby-Doo and the Cyber Chase	THQ	Software Creations	Game Boy Advance
2002	Scooby-Doo (based on the 2002 feature film)	THQ	Helixe	Game Boy Advance
2002	Scooby-Doo! Night of 100 Frights	THQ	Heavy Iron Studios	GameCube; PlayStation 2; Xbox
2002	Scooby-Doo Case Files: 1. The Glowing Bug Man; 2. The Scary Stone Dragon; 3. Frights, Camera, Mystery!	The Learning Company	ImageBuilder; The Learning Company	Microsoft Windows
2003	Scooby-Doo! Mystery Mayhem	THQ	Artificial Mind & Movement	Game Boy Advance; GameCube; PlayStation 2; Xbox
2004	Scooby-Doo 2: Monsters Unleashed	THQ	Altron Corporation	Game Boy Advance
2004	Scooby-Doo 2: Monsters Unleashed	THQ	AWE Games	Microsoft Windows
2005	Scooby-Doo! Unmasked	THQ	Artificial Mind & Movement	Nintendo DS; Game Boy Advance; GameCube; PlayStation 2; Xbox
2006	Scooby-Doo! Who's Watching Who?	THQ	Human Soft	Nintendo DS
2006	Scooby-Doo! Who's Watching Who?	THQ	Savage Entertainment	PlayStation Portable
2009	Scooby-Doo! First Frights	Warner Bros. Games	Torus Games	Wii; Nintendo DS; PlayStation 2; Microsoft Windows
2010	Scooby-Doo! and the Spooky Swamp	Warner Bros. Games	Torus Games	Wii; Nintendo DS; PlayStation 2; Microsoft Windows
2014	Scooby-Doo and Looney Tunes Cartoon Universe: Adventure	Warner Bros. Games	WayForward	Nintendo 3DS; Microsoft Windows
2015	My Friend Scooby-Doo!	Warner Bros. Games	Genera Games	iOS; Android
2018	Scooby-Doo! Mystery Cases	Warner Bros. Games	Sarbakan	iOS; Android
2024	MultiVersus	Warner Bros. Games	Player First Games	PlayStation 4 PlayStation 5 Microsoft Windows Xbox One Xbox Series X and Series S

== Plays ==
Original run	Title	Notes
2001–05	Scooby-Doo in Stagefright	Revived on world tours in 2005, 2007, and 2009.
2009	Scooby-Doo and the Pirate Ghost	
2012–13	Scooby-Doo: The Mystery of the Pyramid	
2013	Scooby-Doo Live! Musical Mysteries	
2016	Scooby-Doo Live! Level Up	
2020	Scooby-Doo and the Lost City of Gold	Run ultimately cut short by the COVID-19 pandemic.

== Unreleased projects ==
Cancellation date	Title	Type	Status
2022	Scoob! Holiday Haunt	Film	Completed
2023	Scooby-Doo and the Haunted High Rise	Film	Incomplete
2023	Scooby-Doo! and the Mystery Pups	TV series	Incomplete
