= List of Ron Perlman performances =

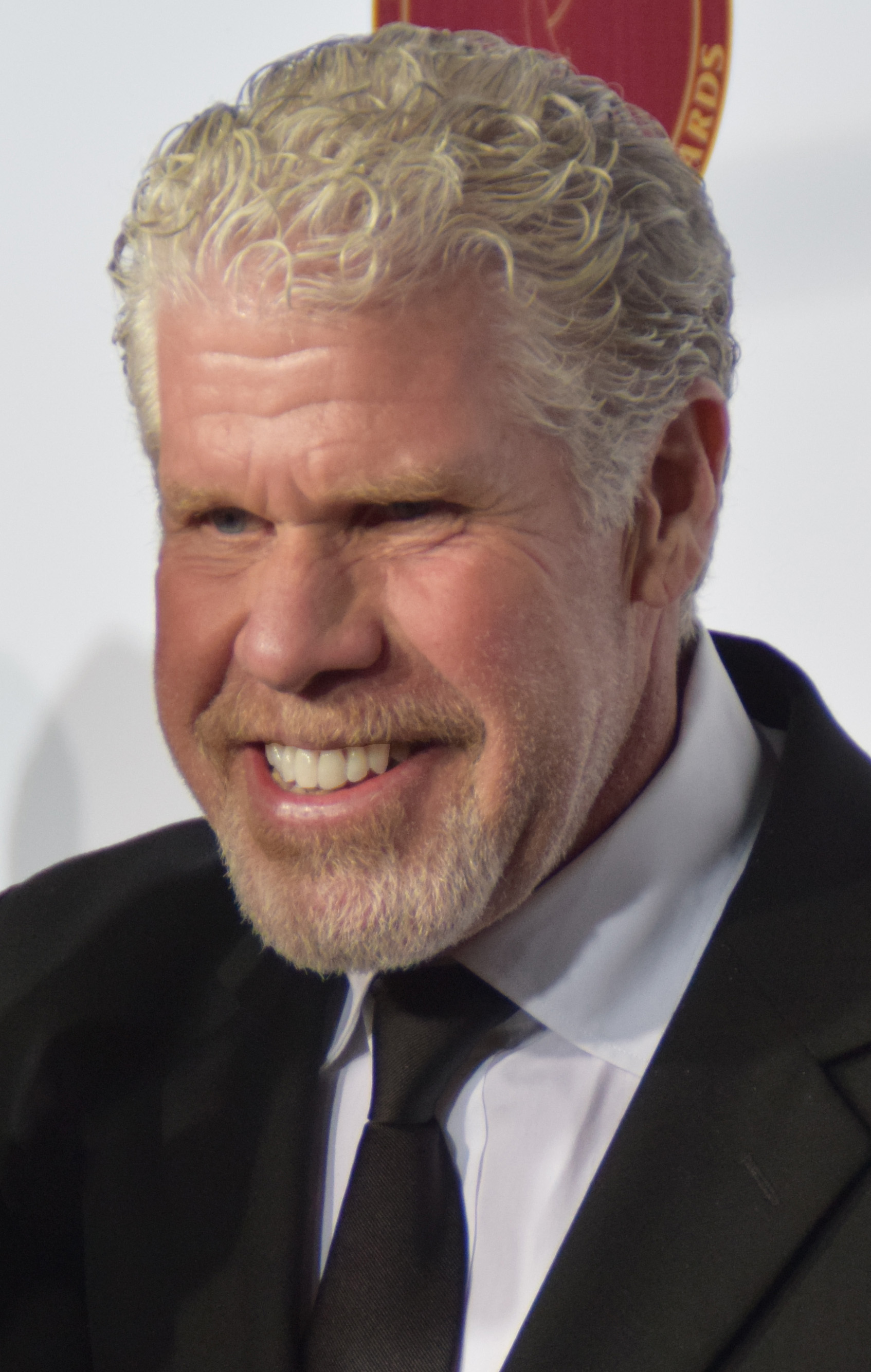
Perlman in February 2015

American actor Ron Perlman has had an extensive career in both stage and screen since he started acting in 1975. His first television role was on the soap opera Ryan's Hope in 1979. He went on to play Vincent on the fantasy-drama series Beauty and the Beast opposite Linda Hamilton (1987–1990), which earned him a Golden Globe Award for Best Performance by an Actor in a Television Series - Drama. He also voiced Sergeant Francis Q. Grating on the animated series Bonkers (1993–1994), voiced Graft on the animated series Phantom 2040 (1994–1995), played Josiah Sanchez on the western series The Magnificent Seven (1998–2000), voiced Slade on the animated series Teen Titans (2003–2006), voiced Vice Principal Mr. Lancer on the Nickelodeon original animated series Danny Phantom (2004–2007) and he narrated the Spike anthology series 1000 Ways to Die (2008–2012). From 2008 to 2013, he co-starred as Clay Morrow on the action crime drama series Sons of Anarchy with Charlie Hunnam and Katey Sagal. He also starred in the drama series Hand of God with Dana Delany (2014–2017) and in seasons 2 and 3 of the crime drama series StartUp with Adam Brody (2017–2018).

Perlman's film work includes frequent collaborations with Mexican director Guillermo del Toro, most notably starring as the title character in the 2004 superhero film Hellboy, and its 2008 sequel Hellboy II: The Golden Army. Perlman has also worked with del Toro on the films Cronos opposite Federico Luppi (1993), Blade II opposite Wesley Snipes (2002), Pacific Rim opposite Charlie Hunnam (2013) and Nightmare Alley with Bradley Cooper (2021). Perlman's other film roles include the 1996 science fiction horror film The Island of Dr. Moreau with Val Kilmer, 1997 science fiction horror film Alien Resurrection with Sigourney Weaver, and the 2011 sword and sorcery film Conan the Barbarian. He voiced Optimus Primal in the 2023 science fiction action film Transformers: Rise of the Beasts.

== Film ==
Year	Title	Role	Notes	Ref.
1981	Quest for Fire	Amoukar		
1984	The Ice Pirates	Zeno		
1986	The Name of the Rose	Salvatore		
1992	Sleepwalkers	Captain Soames		
1993	Cronos	Angel de la Guardia		
1993	Romeo Is Bleeding	Jack's attorney		
1993	The Adventures of Huck Finn	Pap Finn		
1994	When the Bough Breaks	Dr. Douglas Eben		
1994	Double Exposure	John McClure		
1994	Police Academy: Mission to Moscow	Konstantine Konali		
1994	Sensation	Detective Pantella		
1995	The City of Lost Children	One		
1995	Fluke	Sylvester		
1995	The Last Supper	Norman Arbuthnot		
1995	Crying Freeman	Detective Netah	Voice, uncredited	
1996	The Island of Dr. Moreau	Sayer of the Law		
1997	Prince Valiant	Boltar		
1997	Tinseltown	Cliff		
1997	Alien Resurrection	Johner		
1997	The Protector	Dr. Ramsey Krago		
1998	I Woke Up Early the Day I Died	Cemetery Caretaker		
1998	Frogs for Snakes	Gascone		
1998	Betty	Donnie Shank		
1998	An American Tail: The Treasure of Manhattan Island	Mr. Grasping	Voice, direct-to-video	
1999	Happy, Texas	Marshal Nalhober		
2000	The King's Guard	Lord Morton		
2000	Price of Glory	Nick Everson		
2000	Bread and Roses	Himself	Uncredited cameo	
2000	Stroke	Schumaker		
2000	Titan A.E.	Sam Tucker	Voice	
2001	Down	Mitchell		
2001	Enemy at the Gates	Koulikov		
2002	L'Chayim, Comrade Stalin!	Narrator	Documentary	
2002	Blade II	Dieter Reinhardt		
2002	Night Class	Morgan		
2002	Crime and Punishment	Dusharo		
2002	Star Trek: Nemesis	Reman Viceroy		
2002	Shakedown	Christopher 'St. Joy' Bellows	Direct-to-video	
2003	Boys on the Run	Captain		
2003	Rats	Dr. William Winslow		
2003	Hoodlum & Son	'Ugly' Jim McCrae		
2003	Absolon	Murchison		
2003	Two Soldiers	Colonel McKellog	Short film	
2003	Looney Tunes: Back in Action	Acme VP of Never Learning		
2004	Comic Book: The Movie	Himself	Cameo, direct-to-video	
2004	Hellboy	Hellboy		
2004	Quiet Kill	Detective Sergeant Perry		
2005	The Second Front	General von Binding		
2005	Missing in America	Red		
2005	Scooby-Doo! in Where's My Mummy?	Hotep, Ancient One #2	Voice, direct-to-video	
2005	Tarzan II	Kago	Voice, direct-to-video	
2006	Scooby-Doo! Pirates Ahoy!	Captain Skunkbeard, Biff Wellington	Voice, direct-to-video	
2006	Hellboy: Sword of Storms	Hellboy	Voice, direct-to-video	
2006	Local Color	Curtis Sunday		
2006	How to Go Out on a Date in Queens	Vito		
2006	The Last Winter	Ed Pollack		
2006	Five Girls	Father Drake		
2007	In the Name of the King: A Dungeon Siege Tale	Norick		
2007	Hellboy: Blood and Iron	Hellboy	Voice, direct-to-video	
2007	Battle for Terra	Elder Vorin	Voice	
2008	The Spiderwick Chronicles	Redcap	Voice, uncredited	
2008	Spirit of the Forest	Oak	Voice	
2008	Uncross the Stars	Bobby Walden		
2008	Hellboy II: The Golden Army	Hellboy		
2008	Outlander	Gunnar		
2008	Mutant Chronicles	Brother Samuel		
2009	The Devil's Tomb	Dr. Lee Wesley	Direct-to-Video	
2009	Dark Country	Deputy Thompson	Direct-to-video	
2009	I Sell The Dead	Father Duffy		
2009	The Job	Jim		
2010	Killer by Nature	Dr. Julian		
2010	Tangled	The Stabbington Brothers	Voice	
2010	The Legend of Secret Pass	Parker	Voice	
2010	Acts of Violence	Priest Bill		
2010	Bunraku	Nicola		
2010	Season of the Witch	Felson		
2011	The Littlest Angel	God	Voice, direct-to-video	
2011	Conan the Barbarian	Corin		
2011	Drive	Nino		
2011	Elwood	Louie the Jaw	Short film; also executive producer	
2012	The Scorpion King 3: Battle for Redemption	Horus	Direct-to-video	
2012	Bad Ass	Mayor Williams		
2012	The Punisher: Dirty Laundry	Big Mike	Short film	
2012	Crave	Pete		
2012	3,2,1... Frankie Go Boom	Phil		
2012	The Savoy King: Chick Webb & the Music That Changed America	Gene Krupa	Voice, documentary	
2013	Justice League: The Flashpoint Paradox	Slade Wilson / Deathstroke	Voice, direct-to-video	
2013	Percy Jackson: Sea of Monsters	Polyphemus	Voice	
2013	Pacific Rim	Hannibal Chau		
2014	The Virginian	Judge Henry	Direct-to-video	
2014	Tbilisi, I Love You	American motorcyclist		
2014	The Book of Life	Xibalba	Voice	
2014	13 Sins	Chilcoat		
2014	Before I Disappear	Bill		
2014	Kid Cannabis	Barry Lerner		
2014	Dermaphoria	Anslinger		
2014	Skin Trade	Viktor Dragovic	Direct-to-video	
2014	Poker Night	Calabrese		
2015	Moonwalkers	Kidman		
2015	Bone in the Throat	—N/a	Executive producer	
2015	Stonewall	Ed Murphy		
2016	Chuck	Al Braverman		
2016	All I See Is You	—N/a	Executive producer	
2016	Fantastic Beasts and Where to Find Them	Gnarlack	Voice	
2016	Howard Lovecraft and the Frozen Kingdom	Shoggoth	Voice, direct-to-video	
2017	Howard Lovecraft and the Undersea Kingdom	Shoggoth	Voice, direct-to-video	
2017	All Nighter	—N/a	Executive producer	
2017	Sergio and Sergei	Peter	Also executive producer	
2017	Pottersville	Sheriff Jack	Also producer	
2018	To Dust	—N/a	Producer only	
2018	The Escape of Prisoner 614	The Sheriff	Also executive producer	
2018	Asher	Asher	Also producer	
2018	The Steam Engines of Oz	Magnus	Voice, direct-to-video	
2019	Go Fish	Bernardo	Voice, direct-to-video	
2019	The Great War	General Pershing		
2019	Run with the Hunted	Birdie	Also executive producer	
2019	Hell on the Border	Charlie Storm		
2020	Havana Kyrie	Henry		
2020	Clover	Mr. Wiley		
2020	The Big Ugly	Preston	Also executive producer	
2020	Monster Hunter	Admiral		
2021	This Game's Called Murder	Mr. Wallendorf		
2021	The Last Victim	Sheriff Hickey		
2021	Boris Karloff: The Man Behind the Monster	Himself	Documentary	
2021	Nightmare Alley	Bruno		
2021	Don't Look Up	Benedict Drask		
2022	There Are No Saints	Sans		
2022	The Baker	Pappi Sabinski		
2022	Guillermo del Toro's Pinocchio	Podestà	Voice	
2022	How I Got There	The Merc		
2023	Heroes of the Golden Masks	Kunyi	Voice	
2023	Transformers: Rise of the Beasts	Optimus Primal	Voice	
2023	The Retirement Plan	Bobo		
2023	Day of the Fight	Stevie		
2024	The Instigators	Mayor Miccelli		
2024	Joe Baby	Prentice Stanton		
2024	Succubus	Dr. Orion Zephyr		
2024	Absolution	Charlie Conner		
2025	Play Dirty	Murray		
2025	Paradise Records	The Chief		
2025	The Ride	The Ride	Voice; short film	
2025	Asteroid		Short film	
2025	Cottonmouth	Dr. Victor Caine		
2025	Ya No Quedan Junglas	Theo		
2026	The Saviors	Mr. Harrison		
2026	Come With Me	Dalton Kirby		
2026	Stranglehold	Roger		
2026	Fortitude †	George S. Patton	Post-production	
2027	Seasons †	TBA	Post-production	
TBA	Saurus City †	Slade Klossus	Voice, completed	
TBA	We Could Be Heroes †	TBA	Post-production	
TBA	Renew †	TBA	Post-production	
TBA	Foster †	Brooks	Post-production	

Key
†	Denotes films that have not yet been released

== Television ==
Year	Title	Role	Notes	Ref.
1979	Ryan's Hope	Dr. Bernie Marx	2 episodes	
1985	The Fall Guy	Thug	Episode: "Split Image"	
1985	Our Family Honor	Bausch	2 episodes	
1985	MacGruder and Loud	Attorney	Episode: "The Very Scary Man"	
1986	The Insiders	—N/a	Episode: "Den of Thieves"	
1986	Miami Vice	John Ruger	Episode: "Walk-Alone"	
1987–1990	Beauty and the Beast	Vincent	55 episodes	
1988	A Stoning in Fulham County	Jacob Shuler	Television film	
1992	Blind Man's Bluff	Frank Cerrillo	Television film	
1992–1993	Batman: The Animated Series	Matt Hagen / Clayface, Driller	Voice, 4 episodes	
1993	Animaniacs	Satan, Sergeant Sweete	Voice, 2 episodes	
1993	The Untouchables	Snake	Episode: "Railroaded"	
1993	Arly Hanks	Jim-Bob Buchanan	Television film	
1993–1994	Bonkers	Sergeant Francis Q. Grating	Voice, 17 episodes	
1994	The Cisco Kid	Lt. Colonel Delacroix	Television film	
1994	Aladdin	Arbutus, General Gouda	Voice, 3 episodes	
1994	Mighty Max	Goar	Voice, episode: "Tar Wars"	
1994	The Little Mermaid	Apollo	Voice, episode: "Heroes"	
1994–1995	Phantom 2040	Graft	Voice, 22 episodes	
1995	Tiny Toon Adventures	Mr. Scratch	Voice, episode: "Night Ghoulery"	
1995	Fantastic Four	Wizard, Bruce Banner / Hulk	Voice, 2 episodes	
1995	Picture Windows	Gambler	Episode: "Lightning"	
1995	Original Sins	Chas Bradley	Television film	
1995	Mr. Stitch	Doctor Frederick Texarian	Television film	
1995	The Adventures of Captain Zoom in Outer Space	Lord Vox of Vestron	Television film	
1996	Highlander: The Series	The Messenger	Episode: "The Messenger"	
1996	Iron Man	Bruce Banner / Hulk	Voice, episode: "Hulk Buster"	
1996	Wing Commander Academy	Daimon Karnes	Voice, 2 episodes	
1996	Duckman	Roland Thompson	Voice, episode: "They Craved Duckman's Brain!"	
1996	Mortal Kombat: Defenders of the Realm	Kurtis Stryker	Voice, 13 episodes	
1996, 1998	Hey Arnold!	Mickey Kaline	Voice, 2 episodes	
1997	Tracey Takes On...	Stuart	Episode: "Secrets"	
1997	Perversions of Science	40132	Episode: "The Exile"	
1997	The Second Civil War	Alan Manieski	Television film	
1997–1998	The New Batman Adventures	Clayface	Voice, 2 episodes	
1997–1999	Superman: The Animated Series	Jax-Ur	Voice, 3 episodes	
1998	Godzilla	Leviathan Alien, Ship Captain	Voice, episode: "Leviathan"	
1998	The Outer Limits	Lt. Colonel Brandon Grace	Episode: "Black Box"	
1998	A Town Has Turned to Dust	Jerry Paul	Television film	
1998	Houdini	Booking Agent	Television film	
1998–2000	The Magnificent Seven	Josiah Sanchez	22 episodes	
1999	Family Law	Roy	Episode: "The List"	
1999	Supreme Sanction	The Director	Television film	
1999	Primal Force	Frank Brodie	Television film	
1999	Men in Black: The Series	Drekk, Javkor	Voice, episode: "The Puppy Love Syndrome"	
2000	The Wild Thornberrys	Wild Horse	Voice, episode: "Horse Sense"	
2000	Jackie Chan Adventures	Dr. Karl Nivor	Voice, episode: "Shell Game"	
2000	Buzz Lightyear of Star Command	Leader	Voice, episode: "Haunted Moon"	
2000	Operation Sandman	Dr. Harlan Jessup	Television film	
2000	The Trial of Old Drum	Charles Burden Sr.	Television film	
2001	The Legend of Tarzan	Colonel Nikolas Rokoff	Voice, episode: "Tarzan and the Lost Treasure"	
2001	Charmed	Mr Kelleman	Episode: "Wrestling with Demons"	
2001	The Tick	Fiery Blaze	Episode: "Couples"	
2003	Static Shock	Dr. Koenig / Heavyman	Voice, episode: "The Parent Trap"	
2003	Justice League	Clayface, Orion	Voice, 4 episodes	
2003–2006	Teen Titans	Slade	Voice, 17 episodes	
2004–2007	Danny Phantom	Vice Principal Mr. Lancer	Voice, 23 episodes	
2005	What's New, Scooby-Doo?	Russian Inspector, Joe, Frozen Fiend	Voice, episode: "Diamonds Are a Ghoul's Best Friend"	
2005	I Love the '80s 3-D	Himself	Episode: "1982"	
2005–2008	The Batman	Killer Croc, Bane, Rumor	Voice, 4 episodes	
2006	Masters of Horror	Dwayne Burcell	Episode: "Pro-Life"	
2006	Stephen King's Desperation	Collie Entragian	Television film	
2006	Justice League Unlimited	Orion	Voice, episode: "Flash and Substance"	
2007	Afro Samurai	Justice	Voice, 2 episodes	
2007	Kim Possible	Warhawk	Voice, 2 episodes	
2007	Avatar: The Last Airbender	Fire Lord Sozin	Voice, episode: "The Avatar and the Fire Lord"	
2008–2010	Chowder	Arbor, Man	Voice, 3 episodes	
2008–2012	1000 Ways to Die	Narrator	Uncredited, 45 episodes	
2008–2013	Sons of Anarchy	Clay Morrow	75 episodes	
2009	Star Wars: The Clone Wars	Gha Nachkt	Voice, 2 episodes	
2009	Robot Chicken	Tony Stark, Handy Ball	Voice, episode: "Tell My Mom"	
2010	Batman: The Brave and the Bold	Doctor Double X	Voice, episode: "A Bat Divided!"	
2010, 2014	Archer	Ramon Limon	Voice, 2 episodes	
2011–2012, 2020	American Dad!	Monster Hunter, Colonel, Fang, Bandit	Voice, 4 episodes	
2011–2017	Adventure Time	The Lich	Voice, 10 episodes	
2012	DC Nation Shorts	Slade, Alfred Pennyworth	Voice, 3 episodes	
2013	Green Lantern: The Animated Series	Thaal Sinestro	Voice, episode: "Prisoner of Sinestro"	
2014–2017	Hand of God	Judge Pernell Harris	20 episodes; also executive producer	
2015	The Blacklist	Luther Braxton	2 episodes	
2015	SuperMansion	Blazar	Voice, 2 episodes	
2015–2016	Teenage Mutant Ninja Turtles	Armaggon	Voice, 3 episodes	
2016	Turbo FAST	Darryl	Voice, episode: "Keep on Truckin'"	
2016	Maron	Mel	2 episodes	
2016–2017	Trollhunters: Tales of Arcadia	Bular	Voice, 12 episodes	
2017–2018	StartUp	Wes Chandler	20 episodes	
2017–2019	Rapunzel's Tangled Adventure	The Stabbington Brothers	Voice, 3 episodes	
2018	Transformers: Power of the Primes	Optimus Primal	Voice, 7 episodes	
2018	The Truth About the Harry Quebert Affair	Roy	7 episodes	
2018–2019	Final Space	John Goodspeed	Voice, 6 episodes	
2019	Splitting Up Together	Brock	Episode: "Welcome Home"	
2019	Reprisal	Big Graham	3 episodes	
2019–2026	The Capture	Frank Napier	15 episodes	
2020	Reno 911!	DUI Detainee	Episode: "The Return of Diablo"	
2021	Adventure Time: Distant Lands	The Lich	Voice, episode: "Together Again"	
2023	Poker Face	Sterling Frost Sr.	2 episodes	
2023	Adventure Time: Fionna and Cake	The Lich	Voice, 2 episodes	
2024	Mr. & Mrs. Smith	Toby Hellinger	Episode: "Do You Want Kids?"	
2026	Fallout	Super Mutant	Episode: "The Other Player"	
2026	Cape Fear	Robert Cady	4 episodes	
2026	Game Changer	Himself	Episode: "Night Shift"	
2026	Kill Jackie	Sean Senior	Episode: "The Mamas & The Papas'"	
2026	Rock Paper Scissors	Mr. Cheepers	Episode: "The Watching"	

== Video games ==
Year	Title	Voice role	Notes	Ref.
1994	The Adventures of Batman & Robin	Clayface	Uncredited	
1995	Chronomaster	Rene Korda		
1997	Fallout	Butch Harris, Narrator		
1998	Fallout 2	Narrator		
2001	Icewind Dale: Heart of Winter	Wylfdene		
2001	Fallout Tactics: Brotherhood of Steel	Narrator		
2003	Batman: Rise of Sin Tzu	Clayface		
2003	True Crime: Streets of LA	Misha		
2003	Lords of EverQuest	Lord Skass		
2004	The Chronicles of Riddick: Escape from Butcher Bay	Jagger Valance		
2004	Halo 2	Lord Hood		
2005	Gun	Mayor Hoodoo Brown		
2005	Narc	Chief Ed Kowalski		
2005	The Incredible Hulk: Ultimate Destruction	Emil Blonsky / Abomination		
2005	The Outfit	Tommy Mac		
2006	Teen Titans	Slade		
2006	Justice League Heroes	Bruce Wayne / Batman		
2007	Halo 3	Lord Hood		
2007	Conan	Conan the Barbarian		
2008	Turok	Slade		
2008	Hellboy: The Science of Evil	Hellboy		
2008	Fallout 3	Narrator		
2009	Afro Samurai	Justice	English dub	
2009	Tom Clancy's H.A.W.X 2	Dagger		
2010	Fallout: New Vegas	Narrator		
2010	Tangled: The Video Game	Stabbington Brother		
2014	Family Guy: The Quest for Stuff	Himself		
2015	Call of Duty: Black Ops III	Floyd Campbell		
2015	Fallout 4	Anchorman		
2016	Payday 2	Rust		
2016	Lego Dimensions	Gnarlack, The Lich		
2018	Fallout 76	The Speaker		
2020	West of Dead	William Mason		

== Stage ==
Year	Title	Role	Venue	Ref.
1975	A Country Scandal	Vengerovich	Knickerbocker Theatre	
1975–1976	Measure for Measure	Lucio	Knickerbocker Theatre	
1976–1977	The Architect and the Emperor of Assyria	The Emperor	National & European tours	
1977	Sunset	D.J. Rollins	Studio Arena Theater	
1979–1980	Teibele and Her Demon	Beadle Treitel	Brooks Atkinson Theatre	
1984	La Tragedie de Carmen	Lillas Pastia	Lincoln Center	
1990	Self Storage	Cliff	Odyssey Theatre	
1990–1991	A Few Good Men	Lt. Colonel Nathan Jessep	Music Box Theatre	
1991	Love Letters	Andrew	Canon Theatre	
1996	Bus Stop	Dr. Gerald Lyman	Circle in the Square Theatre	
