= Jonathan Sadowski =

American actor (born 1979)

- Born: November 23, 1979 (age 46); Chicago, Illinois, U.S.
- Occupation: Actor
- Years active: 2000–present

Jonathan Sadowski (born November 23, 1979) is an American actor. He is best known for his starring role as Josh Xander Kaminski on the Freeform sitcom Young & Hungry (2014–18). He also starred as Henry Goodson in CBS sitcom $#*! My Dad Says (2010–11).

Sadowski had roles as Paul Antonio in the romantic comedy film She's the Man (2006), Trey in the action film Live Free or Die Hard (2007), Wade in the horror film Friday the 13th (2009), and Blake in the comedy film The Goods: Live Hard, Sell Hard (2009).

== Early life ==
Sadowski was born on November 23, 1979, in Chicago, Illinois, the son of Marirose and Robert Sadowski.

== Career ==
Sadowski first rose to prominence in 2006, with his starring role as Viola Hasting's best friend, Paul Antonio, in the romantic comedy film She's the Man. He subsequently had roles as Trey in the 2007 action thriller Live Free or Die Hard, Wade in the 2009 horror film Friday the 13th, Blake in the 2009 comedy film The Goods: Live Hard, Sell Hard, Paul in the 2012 disaster horror film Chernobyl Diaries, and Hemingway in the 2017 drama film Axis.

Sadowski also had numerous guest starring role in television series, such as NCIS, House, and Chuck. He starred as Henry Goodson in CBS comedy series $#*! My Dad Says (2010–2011). Sadowski gained further recognition for his starring role as Josh Xander Kaminski on the Freeform sitcom Young & Hungry, which aired from 2014 to 2018. He also assumed the role of Devon in Sex Life, which aired in 2021.

In 2023, Sadowski starred in the western thriller Cottonmouth, which was released in 2025.

== Filmography ==
=== Film ===
Year	Title	Role	Notes
2006	She's the Man	Paul Antonio	
2007	Live Free or Die Hard	Trey	
2009	Friday the 13th	Wade	
2009	Spring Breakdown	Doug	
2009	The Goods: Live Hard, Sell Hard	Blake	
2011	Limited	Freddy Highmora	Short film
2012	Chernobyl Diaries	Paul	
2014	All Relative	Harry	
2017	Axis	Hemingway	Voice
2021	The Devil Below	Terry	
2025	Cottonmouth	Frank Ferri	

=== Television ===
Year	Title	Role	Notes
2003	NCIS	Lt. Norski	Episode: "High Seas"
2004	The Division	Bruce Kelso	Episode: "The Box"
2004	LAX	Oleg Karponov	Episode: "Unscheduled Arrivals"
2004	American Dreams	Jefferson	5 episodes
2006	The Loop	Roland	Episode: "Pilot"
2007	The Wedding Bells	Adam	Episode: "The Fantasy"
2007	Entourage	Brett's Assistant	Episode: "The Prince's Bride"
2007	House	Dr. Mason	Episode: "The Right Stuff"
2007	Chuck	Laszlo Mahnovski	Episode: "Chuck Versus the Sandworm"
2008	Terminator: The Sarah Connor Chronicles	Sayles	3 episodes
2010–2011	S#*! My Dad Says	Henry Goodson	18 episodes
2014–2018	Young & Hungry	Josh Kaminski	71 episodes
2015	Sirens	Josh Miller	Episode: "Johnny Nightingale"
2015	Kittens in a Cage	Armand	Episode: "Punch and Lemon Squares"
2017	Chopped: Star Power	Himself	2 episodes
2018–2019	Lethal Weapon	Andrew	5 episodes
2020	Legends of Tomorrow	Bugsy Siegel	Episode: "Miss Me, Kiss Me, Love Me"
2021–2023	Sex/Life	Devon	11 episodes
2022	The Good Doctor	Chris	Episode: "Growth Opportunities"
