= Cottonmouth (film) =

2024 Western Thriller film

- Release poster
- Directed by: Brock Harris
- Written by: Brock Harris, Jared Bonner
- Produced by: Talia Bella, Randy Wayne
- Starring: Ron Perlman; Esai Morales; Eric Nelsen; Martin Sensmeier; James Landry Hébert; Jonathan Sadowski
- Cinematography: Axel Lanzenberg
- Edited by: Chris Roldan
- Music by: Daniel Clive McCallum
- Distributed by: Cineverse
- Release dates: April 2025 (Mammoth Film Festival); November 4, 2025 (United States)
- Running time: 93 minutes
- Country: United States
- Language: English

Cottonmouth is a Western feature film, directed by Brock Harris. The film had its worldwide premiere at the 2025 Mammoth Film Festival.

== Premise ==
Set in 1895, Indian Territory. Ed Dantes (Martin Sensmeier) rides to the town of Ingalls, Oklahoma on the eve of his wedding. Ed brings his saddle chum Frank Ferrin (Jonathan Sadowski) to witness the ceremony but they will soon become enemies when a rivalry develops over Ed's fiancé, saloon singer Sophia played by Alyssa Wapanatâhk. To make matters worse, the saloon is neighbored by the Dunn Inn, owned and operated by Billy Dunn (Eric Nelsen). Dunn has his eyes set on Sophia and her mother's saloon. Ed disappear to a tortuous prison run by a sinister warden (Ron Perlman). In order to survive, Ed must learn the ways of the outlaw from his cell-mate (Esai Morales) to escape and exact his revenge.

== Cast ==
- Martin Sensmeier as Edward "Ed" Dantes
- Ron Perlman as Warden Victor Cain
- Esai Morales as Abe
- Jonathan Sadowski as Frank Ferri
- Eric Nelsen as Billy Dunn
- Jonathan Lipnicki as Norm
- James Landry Hébert as Cook

== Production ==
Cottonmouth was produced by Randy Wayne, and Talia Bella of Rebellium Films, and shot on location in Dewey, Oklahoma, with production headquarters in Tulsa, Oklahoma. Stunt were coordinated by Ardeshir Radpour. Production was lensed by DP Axel Lanzenberg.

== Release ==
The film premiered at the 2025 Mammoth Film Festival. Cineverse released the film on VOD on November 4.
