= Ron Perlman =

American actor (born 1950)

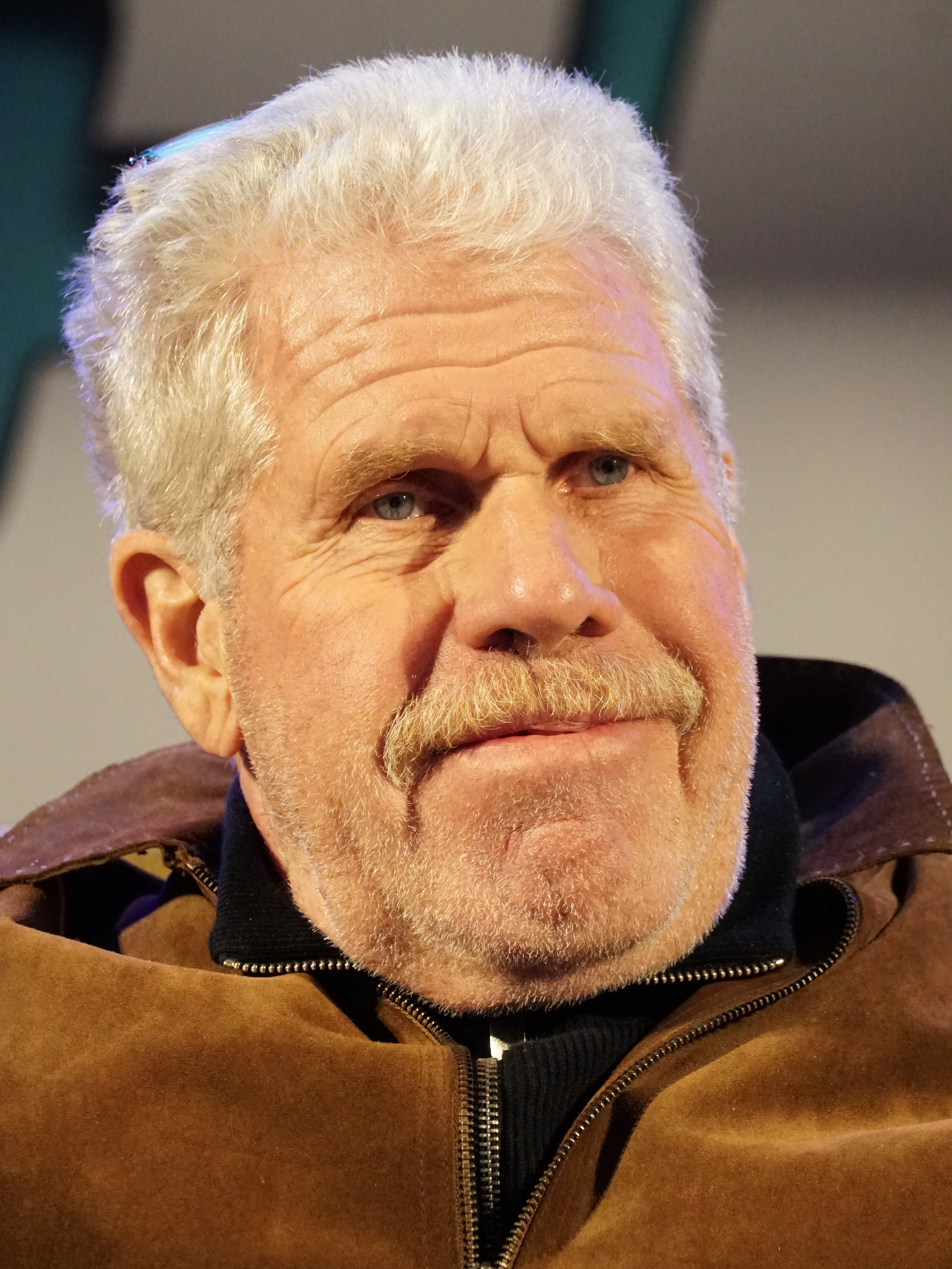
- Perlman in 2022
- Born: Ronald N. Perlman; April 13, 1950 (age 76); New York City, United States
- Education: Lehman College (BA); University of Minnesota (MFA)
- Occupation: Actor
- Years active: 1975–present
- Works: Full list
- Spouses: Opal Stone (m. 1981; div. 2019) Allison Dunbar (m. 2022)
- Children: 2, including Delroy Edwards

Ronald N. Perlman (born April 13, 1950) is an American actor. His credits include the roles of Amoukar in Quest for Fire (1981), Salvatore in The Name of the Rose (1986), Vincent in the television series Beauty and the Beast (1987–1990), for which he won a Golden Globe Award, One in The City of Lost Children (1995), Johner in Alien Resurrection (1997), Koulikov in Enemy at the Gates (2001), Hellboy in both Hellboy (2004) and its sequel Hellboy II: The Golden Army (2008), Clay Morrow in the television series Sons of Anarchy (2008–2013), Nino in Drive (2011), and Benedict Drask in Don't Look Up (2021). A frequent collaborator of Hellboy director Guillermo del Toro, he has had roles in the del Toro films Cronos (1992), Blade II (2002), Pacific Rim (2013), Nightmare Alley (2021), and Pinocchio (2022).

As a voice actor, he is known as the narrator of the post-apocalyptic game series Fallout (1997–present), Clayface in the DC Animated Universe (1992–2006), Slade in Teen Titans (2003–2006), Mr. Lancer in Danny Phantom (2004–2007), Lord Hood in the video games Halo 2 (2004) and Halo 3 (2007), the Stabbington brothers in Tangled (2010), The Lich in the Adventure Time franchise (2011–2023), and Xibalba in The Book of Life (2014).

== Early life and education ==
Ronald N. Perlman was born on April 13, 1950, in Washington Heights, Manhattan, New York City. His mother, Dorothy (née Rosen), was a municipal employee, and his father, Bertram "Bert" Perlman, was a jazz drummer and television repairman. He is Jewish.

Perlman said in 1988, "It was not a bad childhood but I had a perception of myself that was ... I was terribly overweight as a young kid, and it was sort of a low self image." He stated this experience is something that attracts him to roles where he portrays "these sorts of deformed people who are very endearing." Perlman had a "very close" relationship with his father, who convinced his son he "had to" pursue a career as an actor after seeing him perform in a college production of Guys and Dolls.

Perlman graduated from George Washington High School in 1967 and Lehman College in 1971. He later attended the University of Minnesota, where he graduated with a master's degree in theater arts in 1973.

== Career ==
=== Film and television ===
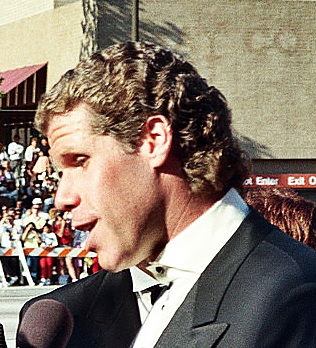
Perlman at the 41st Primetime Emmy Awards in September 1989

Perlman made his television debut in the soap opera Ryan's Hope in 1979. He made his feature film debut in Jean-Jacques Annaud's film Quest for Fire (1981). Annaud later revealed that when he contacted Perlman to ask him about playing Salvatore in The Name of the Rose (1986), Perlman was thinking of abandoning his career. After various minor and supporting roles in film and television, he got his breakthrough leading role as Vincent on the television series Beauty and the Beast, opposite Linda Hamilton, from 1987 to 1990. This earned him a Golden Globe Award for Best Performance by an Actor in a Television Series in 1989.

He went on to play supporting roles in many films throughout the 1990s as well as the 2000s. His most notable film appearances were in films such as Romeo is Bleeding (1993), The Adventures of Huck Finn (1993), Police Academy: Mission to Moscow (1994), The Last Supper (1995), The Island of Dr. Moreau (1996), Alien Resurrection (1997), Enemy at the Gates (2001), Blade II and Star Trek: Nemesis (both 2002) and two Stephen King adaptations, Sleepwalkers and Desperation. His appearances on television series include Highlander: The Series, The Outer Limits, The Magnificent Seven, and the Amazon series Hand of God.

He played his first leading film role in 1995, when he played "One" in Jean-Pierre Jeunet and Marc Caro's French-language The City of Lost Children. In 2003, Perlman starred in a commercial for Stella Artois beer. This commercial, which was called "Devil's Island", won a Silver Award at the 2003 British Advertising Awards. He got another leading film role in 2004 when he played the title role in the comic book adaptation Hellboy. Perlman reprised his role as Hellboy in the direct-to-video animated features Hellboy: Sword of Storms (2006) and Hellboy: Blood and Iron (2007) as well as Hellboy II: The Golden Army (2008).

In 2008, Perlman joined the cast of the television series Sons of Anarchy on FX playing Clay Morrow, the national president of the Sons of Anarchy Motorcycle Club. He also played Wes Chandler in the second and third seasons of StartUp in 2017–2018.

In 2022, Perlman starred in Steven Brand's noir thriller Joe Baby alongside Dichen Lachman, Willa Fitzgerald, and Harvey Keitel. In 2025, Perlman starred in the Western thriller Cottonmouth. Perlman starred in the 2024 horror film Succubus, written and directed by R.J. Daniel Hanna. In 2026, Perlman appeared in a cameo role as a super mutant in the Fallout episode "The Other Player".

=== Voice-over work ===
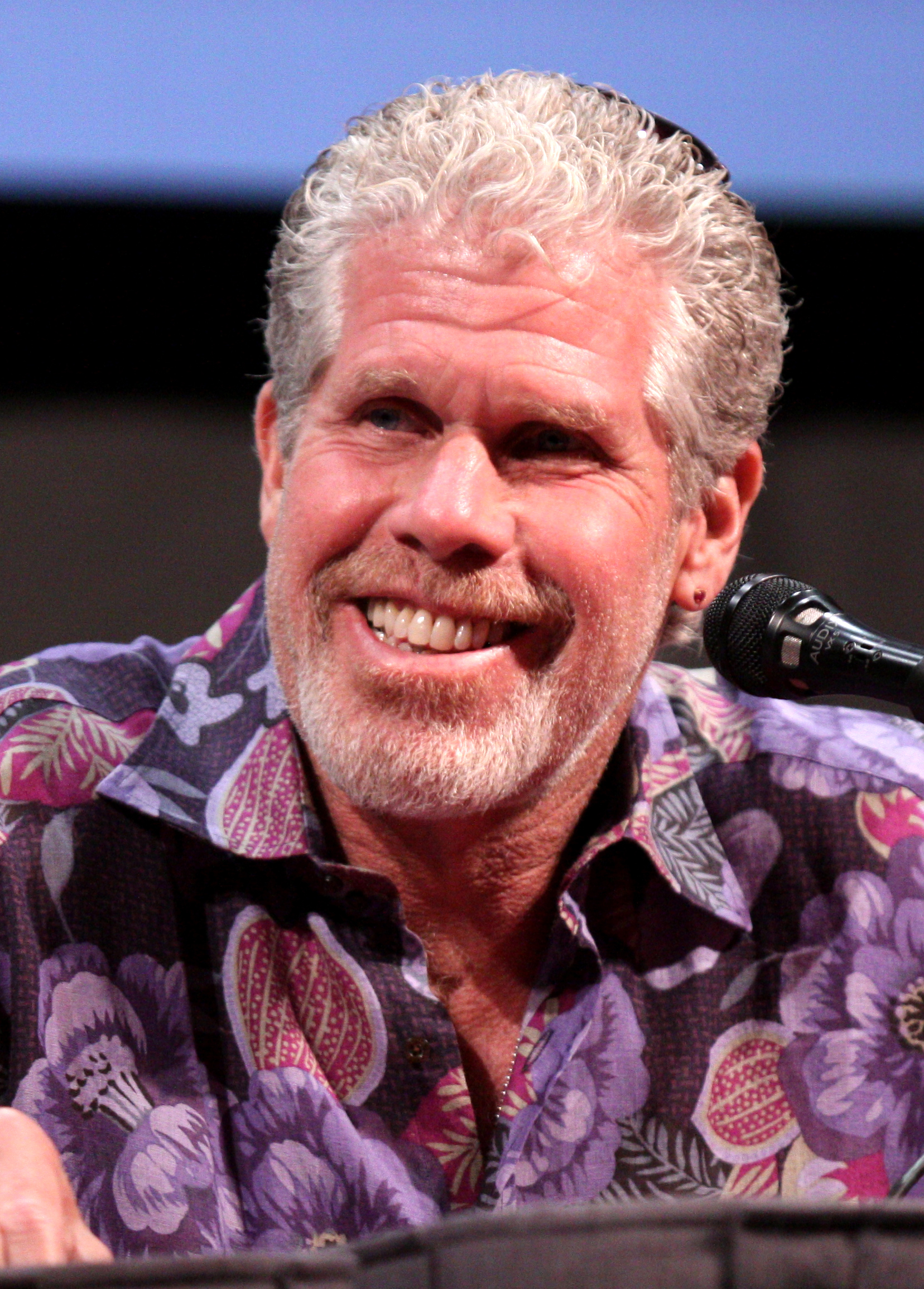
Perlman at the 2011 San Diego Comic-Con

Perlman also has a successful career as a voice actor. He has portrayed characters in numerous video games and animated series, and done voice-over work for television commercials. These include Casper High English teacher and vice-principal Mr. Lancer in Danny Phantom, "Mickey Kaline" in Hey Arnold!, The Lich in Adventure Time, Kurtis Stryker in Mortal Kombat: Defenders of the Realm, Justice in Afro Samurai and various characters in DC Comics based series such as the villainous Slade, a version of DC character Deathstroke in the Teen Titans animated series and again in Justice League: The Flashpoint Paradox, Clayface in Batman: The Animated Series and The New Batman Adventures, Jax-Ur in Superman: The Animated Series, Orion in Justice League and Justice League Unlimited (the former in which he reprised his role as Clayface as well as voicing Orion), Sozin in Avatar: The Last Airbender, several villains (Killer Croc, Rumor, and Bane) in The Batman, Doctor Double X in Batman: The Brave and the Bold, and Sinestro in Green Lantern: The Animated Series. In addition, he served as the narrator for 1000 Ways to Die from 2009 to 2012.

His video game credits include Terrence Hood in the games Halo 2 and Halo 3, Jagger Valance in The Chronicles of Riddick: Escape from Butcher Bay, and Batman in Justice League Heroes. He is known by Fallout fans for narrating the introductory films in the series, including uttering the famous phrase "War. War never changes." He also voices Slade in the 2008 Turok game, and Emil Blonsky / Abomination in The Incredible Hulk: Ultimate Destruction, Conan for the PS3 and Xbox 360, and voices the fast-talking Mayor Hoodoo Brown in the Neversoft game Gun. He also made an appearance in Payday 2 as "Rust", part of the "Biker Pack" DLC. In Call of Duty: Black Ops III (2016), Perlman offered his likeness and voice to one of the lead playable characters in the game's popular Zombies mode.

Perlman was the narrator of the award-winning documentary Forget Us Not, which presents the stories of some of the 5 million non-Jewish Holocaust survivors.

Perlman has also provided narration for a number of audiobooks, including City of Thieves by David Benioff. Perlman also does narration in the UFC's cold open promos for pay-per-view events.

== Personal life ==
Perlman married Opal Stone, an Afro-Jamaican jewelry designer, on Valentine's Day 1981 and they had two children together: daughter Blake Amanda (b. 1984) and son Brandon Avery (b. 1990). They separated in May 2019 and Perlman later filed for divorce. In 2022, Perlman married his StartUp co-star Allison Dunbar in Italy after three years of dating.

His son Brandon produces electronic music under the stage name Delroy Edwards.

Perlman is a lifelong Democrat. He has been a vocal critic of U.S. President Donald Trump. On November 9, 2016, Perlman announced via Facebook his intention to run for U.S. President in the 2020 election, but later specified that this was a joke. In January 2019, he endorsed the candidacy of Kamala Harris. Perlman spoke in support of the 2023 SAG-AFTRA and WGA strikes and criticized an executive from the Alliance of Motion Picture and Television Producers who said that the association should delay negotiations with striking workers until they began to lose their homes.

== Books ==
Year	Title
2014	Easy Street (the Hard Way): A Memoir
