= Scooby-Doo! Night of 100 Frights =

2002 video game

- North American PlayStation 2 cover art
- Developer: Heavy Iron Studios
- Publisher: THQ
- Director: Shiraz Akmal
- Producer: Anna Donlon
- Designers: Gary Sproul; Matt Coohill; Justin Norr
- Programmer: Shiraz Akmal
- Artist: Jeffrey Berting
- Writer: Dan Slott
- Composers: Todd Dennis; Tommy Tallarico; Howard Ulyate
- Engine: RenderWare
- Platforms: GameCube; PlayStation 2; Xbox
- Release: PlayStation 2: NA: May 29, 2002; EU: August 16, 2002; AU: October 31, 2002; GameCube: NA: September 12, 2002; EU: November 22, 2002; Xbox: NA: August 26, 2003
- Genre: Platform
- Mode: Single-player

Scooby-Doo! Night of 100 Frights is a 3D platform game developed by Heavy Iron Studios and published by THQ for the PlayStation 2, GameCube, and Xbox. The game was released in May 2002 in North America and was released later that year in PAL regions. It was the first Scooby-Doo! video game on sixth-generation consoles. The PlayStation 2 version became a Greatest Hits title in May 2003. The next Scooby-Doo game to be released for consoles was Scooby-Doo! Mystery Mayhem.

The game puts players in the control of Scooby-Doo in a story that revolves around him searching for the rest of the gang around a haunted mansion after they are kidnapped by an eccentric villain. The game has twelve areas, ranging from graveyards and secret labs to fishing villages and haunted mazes.

== Gameplay ==
Night of 100 Frights is primarily a third-person game with action elements. The player controls the title character Scooby-Doo. The primary goal of the game is to hunt for the gang after they go missing at the mysterious Mystic Manor. Scooby has several abilities in the game as well as many inventions he finds on the grounds of the mansion to aid him in his search.

The game (top) recreates iconic scenes from the original show (bottom).

The game's combat system allows the player to run, jump, and perform attacks to fend off enemies that are encountered. Various villains from the first three Scooby-Doo shows are met throughout the game, as well as other minor villains like bats, rats, spiders, and crabs. Scooby's health bar goes down when a villain or enemy scares Scooby, and it can only be restored by various food items that can be obtained throughout the game. Whenever Scooby is scared by a villain, if he bashes and kills the villain instantly afterwards, a food item will be provided on the spot to get his health level back up. Scooby also must locate some keys scattered throughout the game and as the game goes on, the number of keys increase; some levels require a certain number of keys to allow Scooby to progress into other areas of the story.

Players can obtain "Monster Tokens", large collectible tokens that have a picture of a Scooby-Doo! villain on them. When the player collects the token, the villain will be able to be viewed in a room in Mystic Manor known as the Monster Gallery, where trivia about the villain is given. Various gadgets that can aid Scooby – "inventions" created by a character in the game known as The Professor – are also scattered throughout the game's levels. Once obtained, the player can return to previous levels to explore areas that weren't accessible before. There are "warp gates", which, when activated, are machines that teleport Scooby to other activated warp gates throughout the game. The boss fights consist of notable Scooby-Doo! villains, such as Redbeard, the Black Knight or the Green Ghost. Various secret passages and trap doors, which act as shortcuts, are scattered throughout the game. Outside levels also have various obstacles, such as moving platforms and mud-slides.

Scooby must also collect Scooby Snacks scattered throughout the game in order to open "Snack Gates" that open many of the game's doors; as the game progresses, the Snack Gates demand more Scooby Snacks. Although it is optional to collect all of the snacks, bonus content is unlocked if the player does so. The voice acting is complemented by sound effects taken from the original series, including a laugh track that reacts to Scooby's on-screen actions.

There are also holiday easter eggs programmed into the game. When the game is played on certain days of the year, special decorations will appear in front of the Manor. For instance, on Christmas, it will be snowing, and on Halloween bats appear above the doors and windows.

== Synopsis ==
=== Setting ===
In a recreation of the classic Scooby-Doo formula, a ghost/monster is terrorizing the locals of a town, with Scooby and the gang called to solve a mystery. An eccentric villain known as the Mastermind kidnaps the gang, and Scooby must venture through graveyards, lighthouses, and secret passages in an effort to solve the mystery and find his friends. The game is mainly set inside a large mansion known as Mystic Manor. The manor has dozens of rooms and floors, from the secret laboratory in the basement to the haunted attic. The game is set during the late hours of the night. Outside of the Manor, players can explore the vast graveyard section as well as the sea pier section. Each section has its own settings, such as fishing canneries and haunted crypts.

=== Plot ===
Mystery Incorporated travels to Mystic Manor to help Daphne’s friend Holly, whose uncle, famed inventor Professor Alexander Graham, has mysteriously vanished. Upon arriving, the gang is quickly separated when a spectral figure known as the Mastermind appears, kidnapping Fred, Velma, Daphne, and Shaggy.

Left alone, Scooby-Doo explores the manor grounds and surrounding areas, uncovering several of the professor’s experimental inventions that help him navigate dangerous locations and confront classic-looking monsters. Along the way, he rescues the other members of the gang one by one, each claiming to have encountered different famous villains from the past.

As Scooby ventures deeper into the manor’s hidden passages and the professor’s secret laboratory, Fred discovers evidence that the monsters are not real but holographic projections. Together, the gang devises a plan to trap the Mastermind and expose the truth.

The Mastermind is captured and unmasked, revealing Professor Graham himself. However, Velma uncovers the real culprit: Holly, who framed her uncle using advanced hologram technology. By exploiting Daphne’s stories about Mystery Inc.’s past cases, Holly recreated their old enemies and orchestrated the entire haunting to steal credit for her uncle’s greatest invention.

Holly is arrested, Professor Graham is cleared, and Mystery Inc. once again proves that every mystery has a logical explanation, even when the ghosts look terrifyingly real.

== Development and release ==
Initially planned for a June 2002 release, the game was released on May 29, 2002 initially for the PlayStation 2 (just after E3 2002), before being ported to other platforms later.

== Reception ==
Reception

Aggregate scores
Aggregator	Score
GameRankings	(Xbox) 70.83% (PS2) 69.54% (GC) 68.14%
Metacritic	(PS2) 69/100 (GC) 68/100 (Xbox) 66/100

Review scores
Publication	Score
AllGame	2.5/5
Electronic Gaming Monthly	7/10
Game Informer	6.5/10
GameSpot	(PS2/GC) 7.3/10 (Xbox) 6.7/10
GameSpy	(PS2) 65% (GC) 3/5
GameZone	(GC/Xbox) 8/10 (PS2) 7.8/10
IGN	(PS2/Xbox) 6.7/10 (GC) 6.1/10
Nintendo Power	3.7/5
Nintendo World Report	8.5/10
Official U.S. PlayStation Magazine	3/5
Official Xbox Magazine (US)	7.7/10
Maxim	8/10

Award
Publication	Award
Sony	"Greatest Hits Title, 2003"

Night of 100 Frights was met with "mixed or average" reviews from critics. GameRankings and Metacritic gave it a score of 69.54% and 69 out of 100 for the PlayStation 2 version; 68.14% and 68 out of 100 for the GameCube version; and 70.83% and 66 out of 100 for the Xbox version. Despite the average reviews, the Academy of Interactive Arts & Sciences nominated the game for "Family Game of the Year" in 2003, which was ultimately awarded to Mario Party 4.

By July 2006, the PlayStation 2 version of Night of 100 Frights had sold 920,000 copies and earned $24 million in the United States. Next Generation ranked it as the 62nd highest-selling game launched for the PlayStation 2, Xbox or GameCube between January 2000 and July 2006 in that country. Combined console sales of Scooby-Doo games released in the 2000s reached 1.8 million units in the United States by July 2006.
