= Scooby-Doo! Mystery Adventures =

Educational video game series

- Developer: The Learning Company
- Publisher: The Learning Company
- Platforms: Macintosh, Microsoft Windows
- Release: NA: October 14, 2000 - October 19, 2001
- Genre: Adventure
- Mode: Single-player

Scooby-Doo! Mystery Adventures is a 3-disc compilation box set of educational computer games based on the Scooby-Doo franchise, and developed by The Learning Company.

== Contents ==
The set includes Scooby-Doo: Showdown in Ghost Town, Scooby-Doo!: Phantom of the Knight, and Scooby-Doo: Jinx at the Sphinx.

== Reception ==
According to PC Data, North American retail sales of Showdown in Ghost Town reached 93,766 units during 2001 alone, while Phantom of the Knight sold 81,154 and Jinx at the Sphinx 62,514 in the same period. In the United States alone, Phantom of the Knight sold 290,000 copies and earned $5.9 million by August 2006. At that time, Edge ranked it as the country's 67th-best-selling computer game released since January 2000. The series as a whole sold 1.4 million units across the same time frame, which led the magazine to call Scooby-Doo! Mystery Adventures "one of the healthiest franchises" in computer games.

In the United States, the computer versions of Jinx at the Sphinx, Showdown in Ghost Town, Mystery of the Fun Park Phantom and The Glowing Bug Man all sold between 100,000 and 290,000 units by August 2006.
