= Scooby-Doo! Unmasked =

2005 video game

- PAL game cover art for the PlayStation 2
- Developer: Artificial Mind and Movement
- Publisher: THQ
- Designers: Flint Dille; John Zuur Platten
- Platforms: Nintendo DS; Game Boy Advance; GameCube; PlayStation 2; Xbox
- Release: Xbox: NA: September 12, 2005; PAL: September 16, 2005; GBA, GameCube, PS2: NA: September 12, 2005; PAL: September 23, 2005; Nintendo DS: NA: October 18, 2005; PAL: November 11, 2005
- Genre: Platformer
- Mode: Single-player

Scooby-Doo! Unmasked is a platform game based on the Scooby-Doo franchise. It was developed by Artificial Mind and Movement and published by THQ for the Xbox, PlayStation 2, GameCube, Game Boy Advance, and Nintendo DS.

== Plot ==
The game opens with Scooby-Doo and the gang visiting Fred's cousin Jed at a special effects movie studio and factory Monstrous Fright and Magic, (M.F.M.) But once they get there, Jed is missing, and his animatronics have gone haywire. They find M.F.M. CEO Winslow Stanton and his assistant Marcy, who declares that Jed is responsible for sabotaging M.F.M., and has not only stolen some expensive animatronics, but also a large supply of Mubber (a special eatable soy-based compound used to make animatronics into life-like special effects monsters, which can be dissolved under UV light). Marcy states that Jed was seen going to the local Chinatown for a New Year's parade. Scooby and the gang take it upon themselves to track down Jed and recover the stolen items.

At their first stop, they meet Maggie Xi, who warns them that the demonic sorcerer, Zen Tuo, and his dragon pet, has disrupted the local festival she is organizing, before she disappears when the dragon's roar is heard. Scooby then finds clues and searches a cookie factory and its alleyways, a sewer to save Shaggy when he fell into it, and a dojo palace to rescue Daphne and track down Zen Tuo. Scooby then battles his dragon in a kung-fu costume made out of Mubber on top of a warehouse. Zen Tuo turns out to be Maggie Xi in disguise, as Velma admits she gave it away when disappearing into the sewer entrance when they first met, using the dragon as a distraction. Maggie cackles as her mubber body disintegrates under UV light, revealing that she was one of the stolen animatronics, with a male voice coming through a hidden device on the floor, telling the gang that they "can't catch what they can't hold!". Though Fred knows that the voice might be Jed, he remains in disbelief.

Velma tracks the signal from the device to the Rock 'n' Roller Coaster Land amusement park, where a man named Alvin Wiener informs the gang that a masked musician, the Guitar Ghoul, has scared off all the other guests. Scooby then finds clues that tell of disturbing events (rides going havoc, animatronics chasing people, etc.). In time, Scooby enters a haunted house and almost gets tricked by the Guitar Ghoul. Scooby and Shaggy decide to then investigate the water slides, the latter falling down one, prompting Scooby to save him. After a scare from the Guitar Ghoul, the two meet Nikki Starlight, who claims to be the Guitar Ghoul's girlfriend and protest that he would have never did what all he just done. Afterward, Daphne is trapped in a cage in a circus tent, and is then saved by Scooby in a new gliding bat costume. Regrouping, the Guitar Ghoul mocks the gang on a big screen, as Scooby finds his location in a house of mirrors and defeats him. The Guitar Ghoul is revealed to be Alvin, as Velma reveals that he is really a failed musician who blamed the Guitar Ghoul for ruining his career. Nikki reveals herself as the real Guitar Ghoul, having done so to keep her private life secret. Velma tells Scooby to smell Alvin's costume, revealing it to be Mubber as Alvin admits he doesn't know the name of the person who gave him the suit. Nikki thanks the gang for saving her reputation and tells them to go to a private natural history museum where M.F.M. worked on some of the exhibits.

There, the gang learns that a Caveman haunts the museum, and when Scooby goes to the dinosaur exhibit, a pterodactyl takes Shaggy when he showed Scooby a drumstick, promoting to save him again. Saving Shaggy, Scooby discovered a large, oil-covered bone in the exhibit, then later finds a contract from Stanton and gives it to Velma. Afterwards, Fred and Daphne are trapped in an aquatic exhibit with the Caveman but are then freed by Scooby in his archer costume. Though in reality, the Caveman was not actually there. Scooby then confronts the Caveman, defeating him in a UFO battle. The Museum's head of security, Joseph Grimm, is revealed to be the Caveman as part of a scheme to sell the valuable petroleum deposits located under the Museum, being pumped up by the bobbing animatronic dinosaurs (which are actually disguised oil pumps) around the museum and disguised as tar. Velma correctly deduces from this chain of events that Stanton is responsible for the thefts, having framed Jed and sent the gang on a wild goose chase to distract them.

The gang heads back to M.F.M to confront Stanton, finding Jed stuffed inside a monster costume where Stanton trapped him when he learned of his plans. Stanton's voice is heard over a loudspeaker, threatening the gang. He summons a giant Pterodactyl robot to battle the gang. Scooby defeats the Pterodactyl in the archer, bat and kung-fu costumes and reaches Stanton's location, but then finds that there are two of them. The real Stanton appears behind the group; a UV light reveals that the other "Stanton" is Marcy in a Mubber disguise. Marcy tells them that she wanted revenge for Stanton taking all the credit for the creation of Mubber, which they both made. Begging for forgiveness, Marcy and Stanton reconcile and Stanton agrees to let her be a full partner in his company. The game ends with Shaggy making a Mubberwich (a sandwich made out of mubber); before he can eat it, Scooby uses the UV light to disintegrate it. Velma replies, "Now that's what I call a "light" snack!" with the gang laughing, as another mystery has been solved.

== Gameplay ==
In the main console versions, the player controls Scooby-Doo to defeat enemies, collect clues for Velma to unlock new levels and secrets, gather ingredients for Shaggy to increase player health, find trap pieces to view enemies, and to solve the overall mystery.

The main mechanic of the game is Scooby-Doo changing into specific costumes, giving him different abilities.

These abilities range from doing kung-fu moves, gliding like a bat, and archery with plungers. However, most costume uses in levels require mubber, a resource dropped by enemies, marked boxes and other such sources. It is also used in some levels to obtain ingredients, and is reset when finishing or exiting a level. The costumes are necessary in order to complete or access some levels.

The Nintendo DS and Gameboy Advance versions are instead shorter 2D platformers with little direct focus on enemy combat, but collecting clues is still the main goals of the game. The DS version also has mechanics with the touchscreen, like a Scientist costume that has you dissolve mubber cubes in the way, boss fight chases that have you avoiding obstacles and triggering traps, and manually researching clues with draggable tools.

== Reception ==
Reception

Aggregate scores
Aggregator	Score
GameRankings	(GC) 66% (PS2) 65.96% (Xbox) 64.50% (DS) 63.75% (GBA) 61.60%
Metacritic	(GC) 64/100 (Xbox) 62/100 (PS2) 61/100 (DS) 60/100 (GBA) 48/100

Review scores
Publication	Score
Eurogamer	6/10
GameSpot	5.7/10
GameZone	(GBA) 8/10 (PS2) 7.3/10 (GC) 7/10 (Xbox) 6.5/10 (DS) 6.2/10
IGN	6.9/10 (DS) 6.5/10
Nintendo Power	7.5/10
Official U.S. PlayStation Magazine	2/5
Official Xbox Magazine (UK)	6/10
Official Xbox Magazine (US)	6.4/10
PALGN	6/10
TeamXbox	7/10

Scooby-Doo! Unmasked received "mixed or average" reviews, according to video game review aggregator Metacritic. GameRankings gave it a score of 64.50% for the Xbox version; 66% and 64 out of 100 for the GameCube version; 65.96% for the PlayStation 2 version; 61.60% for the Game Boy Advance version; and 63.75% for the DS version.

Frank Provo of GameSpot gave the PlayStation 2, GameCube and Xbox versions a 5.7/10, praising its graphics and sound but criticizing its difficulty and length. He stated that "Scooby-Doo! Unmasked isn't much of a game, but it is a decent way to interact with a feature-length Scooby-Doo story."
