= Scooby-Doo! Pirates Ahoy! =

- DVD cover
- Directed by: Chuck Sheetz
- Written by: Margaret M. Dean; Jed Elinoff; Scott Thomas
- Based on: Scooby-Doo by William Hanna, Joseph Barbera, Iwao Takamoto, Joe Ruby, & Ken Spears
- Produced by: Margaret M. Dean; Chuck Sheetz
- Starring: Frank Welker; Casey Kasem; Mindy Cohn; Grey DeLisle; Ron Perlman; Tim Conway; Edie McClurg; Dan Castellaneta; Freddy Rodriguez; Kathy Najimy; Arsenio Hall
- Edited by: Susan Edmunson
- Music by: Steven Argila
- Production company: Warner Bros. Animation
- Distributed by: Warner Home Video
- Release date: September 19, 2006
- Running time: 80 minutes
- Country: United States
- Language: English

Scooby-Doo! Pirates Ahoy! is a 2006 direct-to-DVD animated adventure comedy mystery film, and the tenth in a series of direct-to-video animated films based on the Scooby-Doo Saturday morning cartoons. It was released on September 19, 2006, and it was produced by Warner Bros. Animation, though it featured a logo for and copyright to Hanna-Barbera Cartoons at the end. It features the Mystery, Inc. gang travelling to the Bermuda Triangle on an eerie cruise, with ghosts, pirates, and monsters.

== Plot ==
While making a star map in the Bermuda Triangle, astrocartographer Rupert Garcia's ship is attacked by ghost pirates led by Captain Skunkbeard. Garcia successfully hides from them, but the pirates sink his ship, kidnap his crew, and leave him adrift at sea.

Sometime later, Fred Jones treats his friends in Mystery Inc. to a mystery cruise arranged by his parents Skip and Peggy for his birthday. While preparing to board the ship, Shaggy Rogers and his dog Scooby-Doo encounter a mysterious cloaked man before they and the rest of the gang meet cruise director Sunny St. Cloud and Captain Crothers. As the cruise gets underway, Mystery Inc. quickly solve all of the mysteries that St. Cloud set up, frustrating the other passengers. Soon enough, they rescue Garcia, who warns them of the pirates. While Mystery Inc. assumes this is another of St. Cloud's mysteries, they opt to not get involved. Following this, an eccentric billionaire called Biff Wellington arrives on a jetpack to refuel so that he can resume his attempt at setting a world record for jetpacking around the world.

Later that night, the gang attend a costume dinner party, during which the cloaked man reveals himself as "Mister Mysterio", a famous hypnotist. He chooses Shaggy and Scooby to serve as volunteers for his performance, but the audience falls under his trance instead. He undoes the hypnotism and leaves before Skunkbeard's pirates attack the ship, cause the passengers to disappear, and kidnap Fred's parents before retreating to sink the ship. Realizing they became embroiled in a real mystery, Mystery Inc. find Garcia and escape in the ship's wreckage. The gang follow a glowing trail the pirates left behind to a deserted island, where they find a secret harbor and Garcia's ship before the pirates capture them. Skunkbeard explains that he intends to find the source of the Bermuda Triangle's power, a meteor that fell to Earth 200 years ago, but needs an astrocartographer's help to find it. As he forces Garcia to aid him, the pirates reunite Mystery Inc. with a captive Skip, who reveals he was mistaken for Garcia and has not found anyone else from the ship since his kidnapping.

Eventually, the pirates reach the heart of the triangle and encounter the ghosts of its past victims before using a crane to dredge up the meteor. Amidst this, the gang slip their bonds and head below deck, where they find modern equipment is being used to project illusions of the ghosts. Using the equipment, they engineer a trap for the pirates. Upon subduing them, the gang unmask Skunkbeard as Wellington, his first mate as Mysterio, and the other pirates as the remaining cruise ship passengers and Garcia's crew, among others. Mysterio reveals he hypnotized everyone to aid him in retrieving the meteor, which he reveals further is made of pure gold. Suddenly, a tectonic reaction occurs. Deducing the meteor had something to do with it, the gang return it to the sea before sailing to safety.

Afterward, the group commandeer Mysterio's galleon to return home and subdue him and Wellington while Crothers calls the authorities to ensure the pair are arrested upon their arrival.

== Voice cast ==
- Casey Kasem as Norville "Shaggy" Rogers
- Frank Welker as Fred Jones, Scooby-Doo
- Mindy Cohn as Velma Dinkley
- Grey DeLisle as Daphne Blake
- Ron Perlman as Captain Skunkbeard/Biff Wellington
- Freddy Rodriguez as Rupert Garcia
- Tim Conway as Skip Jones
- Edie McClurg as Peggy Jones/Sea Salt Sally
- Kathy Najimy as Sunny St. Cloud
- Arsenio Hall as Captain Crothers
- Dan Castellaneta as Woodenleg Wally/Mr. Mysterio
