= Scooby-Doo! Frankencreepy =

- DVD cover
- Directed by: Paul McEvoy
- Written by: Jim Krieg
- Based on: Scooby-Doo by Joe Ruby and Ken Spears Frankenstein by Mary Shelley
- Produced by: Paul McEvoy
- Starring: Frank Welker; Grey DeLisle; Mindy Cohn; Matthew Lillard
- Edited by: Kyle Stafford
- Music by: Andy Sturmer
- Production company: Warner Bros. Animation
- Distributed by: Warner Home Video
- Release dates: July 27, 2014 (San Diego Comic-Con); August 5, 2014 (Digital HD); August 19, 2014 (DVD & Blu-ray)
- Running time: 74 minutes
- Country: United States
- Language: English

Scooby-Doo! Frankencreepy is a 2014 direct-to-DVD animated comedy horror film, and the twenty-third film in the direct-to-video series of Scooby-Doo films. It premiered on July 27, 2014, at San Diego Comic-Con, and was released on Digital HD on August 5, 2014. It was released on DVD and Blu-ray on August 19, 2014.

== Plot ==
Velma is notified by Cuthbert Crawley, a lawyer for her family, about inheriting her great uncle's castle in the Germany-influenced Pennsylvanian town of Transylvania. At his office, Velma turns the offer down, replying that she wants nothing to do with her uncle, puzzling her friends. Crawley understands, but soon reveals there is a curse over the property and those who fall victim to it will lose what they love dearly. As the gang leaves, the Mystery Machine is soon destroyed by a mysterious figure wearing an iron mask that is revealed to be the ghost of Velma's baron ancestor. The Mystery Machine's destruction then leaves behind a warning that advises the gang against visiting Transylvania, but Fred declares that is where they are going to find the perpetrator.

Out of options, the gang travel to Transylvania via an express train. When pressured by the gang, Velma reveals the truth about her ancestry – her actual surname is Von Dinkenstein and the baron's ghost is likely her ancestor, Basil, who was said to have created a monster, which inspired Mary Shelley to conceive her novel, Frankenstein. When the train suddenly starts to pick up speed as the gang gets its passengers to safety in the last car, they find the Baron at the front of a train instead of its conductor as he sabotages the train's control panel before informing the gang that the Von Dinkenstein curse is now in effect and disappearing. The gang manage to save the last car, everyone on it and themselves just as the train derails and is destroyed after crashing into a clock tower. As the gang arrive in town, they are introduced to Inspector Krunch, its burgermeister and hunchback Iago, who takes them to the castle, where they meet its housekeeper, Mrs. Vanders. They arrive in its laboratory and find the supposed monster preserved in a block of ice. Perturbed by this revelation, Velma vows to recreate the experiment in order to prove the falsehood of the monster's existence. As the rest of the gang leave, Vanders shows Velma a machine, which hypnotizes her.

Strange things begin to happen when the gang goes to a festival being held in the town – Daphne enters a state of vulnerability upon finding that she has suddenly gained some form of morbid obesity after trying on a dirndl at a local clothes shop; Shaggy and Scooby win an eating contest, but upon trying on some handmade lederhosen, they suddenly lose their appetites and develop a sense of courage; and Fred continues to mourn over the Mystery Machine – the former two later being revealed to be caused by the Von Dinkenstein curse. Iago then arrives and saves the gang, who soon become threatened by the townspeople, and informs them that Velma has gone insane.

When they return, Velma has appeared to have indeed lost her sanity due to her success in bringing the monster back to life. Shaggy and Scooby decide to capture the monster themselves in light of their newfound bravery, but Velma then sedates the monster and reveals a plan to take Shaggy and Scooby's brains and implant them into it, stating the two of them together have almost one whole brain. Things eventually start to become better for the gang – Fred finds a workshop and builds a new carriage-styled version of the Mystery Machine. Daphne discovers that the dirndl has an inflatable suit cunningly built into it, revealing that her supposed affliction was being fabricated. Shaggy and Scooby's lederhosen are torn off, causing their loss of appetite and apparent courage to dissipate; these are later revealed to be the result of injections from Acupuncture needles hidden in the lederhosen. The duo break free of their restraints and flee, but Velma releases the monster in order to recapture them. As the monster begins to pursue them, it inadvertently reactivates the machine that hypnotized Velma, restoring her former personality. Iago appears and tells them that they need to leave the castle because it is about to explode as a result of a gas leak. They manage to escape in the nick of time as they fake their deaths.

The gang then lure the burgermeister, Krunch, the gypsy proprietor of the clothes shop Daphne visited and Vanders to the express train. They trap them in an express car as the train departs, leaving the locked car behind. Just as the mystery seems to be solved, the monster reappears, which is revealed to be a robot controlled by Iago, who then reveals he is actually Shimidlap, an undercover agent from the United States Department of Defense. He explains that one of their exoskeletons was stolen from their research laboratories and traced to Transylvania, meaning it was used to portray the monster following its theft with the one found in the castle's laboratory actually being a lifeless mock-up. It is soon revealed that instead of a culprit, there is actually a conspiracy group consisting of past villains attempting to avenge their previous defeats. Krunch is revealed to be Crawley, who is actually attorney at law Cuthbert Crawls, who, alongside his colleague Cosgood Creeps, attempted to seize the fortune of Colonel Beauregard Sanders. (Note: As depicted in the Scooby-Doo, Where Are You! episode, "A Night of Fright Is No Delight" (1970).) The burgermeister is revealed to be shipping magnate C.L. Magnus, who posed as the ghost of Redbeard, (Note: As depicted in the Scooby-Doo, Where Are You! episode, "Go Away Ghost Ship" (1969).) and the gypsy is revealed to be Lila, a musician involved in the Mamba Wamba case. (Note: As depicted in The Scooby-Doo Show episode, "Mamba Wamba and the Voodoo Hoodoo" (1976).) Finally, Vanders is revealed to be criminal Mama Mione, who posed as Old Iron Face (Note: As depicted in The Scooby-Doo Show episode, "The Creepy Case of Old Iron Face" (1978).); it is additionally revealed that the mask used in the Baron disguise was reused from that persona. The quartet confess that they have been wanting to take revenge on the gang and, once they discovered the history of Velma's ancestry, they bought the castle in order to lure the gang there and carry out their plot. However, they were unaware that the castle was sitting on the natural gas buildup which destroyed it and that they could have instead made a fortune by selling the property. The gang celebrates with the townspeople as Shimidlap presents Fred with a fully restored Mystery Machine. After leaving, Velma acknowledges an ascertainment of how the Von Dinkenstein curse was only a myth – the only thing they truly cherish is their friendship, since it kept persisting throughout the mystery.

== Voice cast ==
- Frank Welker as Scooby-Doo and Frederick "Fred" Jones
- Matthew Lillard as Norville "Shaggy" Rogers
- Mindy Cohn as Velma Dinkley
- Grey DeLisle as Daphne Blake and Mama Mione
- Diedrich Bader as Mrs. Vanders
- Dee Bradley Baker as C.L. Magnus / The Burgermeister
- Eric Bauza as Daphanatic and AlexSuperFan2112 (credited as "Rock Dude")
- Jeff Bennett as Iago / Agent Shmidlap
- Susanne Blakeslee as a townswoman
- Corey Burton as The Ghost of Baron Basil Von Dinkenstein
- Candi Milo as Lila / The Gypsy
- Kevin Michael Richardson as Cuthbert Crawls / Inspector Krunch
- Fred Tatasciore as the vocal effects of the Von Dinkenstein monster
