= Scooby-Doo!: Phantom of the Knight =

2000 video game

- Publisher: The Learning Company
- Platform: Windows
- Release: November 1, 2000

Scooby-Doo!: Phantom of the Knight is a 2000 video game from The Learning Company. It was released on November 1, 2000.

== Gameplay ==
In Scooby-Doo! Phantom of the Knight, players guide the Mystery Inc. gang through a medieval castle to uncover clues and solve puzzles that lead to the culprit. The adventure unfolds by collecting items and using them in specific locations. Progress depends not only on finding clues but also on completing mini-games. Success in these games earns Scooby snacks, which are required to persuade Scooby into exploring spooky areas. Difficulty levels adjust the number of snacks needed and the complexity of puzzles, with each level introducing a different villain and new clues. Gameplay is controlled entirely with the mouse, and when clues are gathered efficiently, the adventure lasts about as long as a cartoon episode.

== Reception ==
Reception

Review scores
Publication	Score
All Game Guide	3/5
Just Adventure	A

All Game Guide said "It's very effective for the targeted age group and is just difficult enough to keep interest high".

Kids Domain said "Despite these small reservations, we loved this game, and I would recommend it for children in the mid range of 6-9 years of age".

According to PC Data, the game sold 81,154 copies.
