= Scooby-Doo! Mystery Mayhem =

2003 video game

- PAL region Xbox cover art
- Developer: Artificial Mind and Movement
- Publisher: THQ
- Producer: Alexandre Parizeau
- Designer: Elie Charest
- Programmer: Stéphane Cravel
- Composer: Jean-Frédéric Vachon
- Engine: RenderWare
- Platforms: Game Boy Advance, GameCube, PlayStation 2, Xbox
- Release: Game Boy Advance: NA: September 10, 2003; PAL: November 7, 2003; PlayStation 2, Nintendo GameCube & Xbox: NA: March 2, 2004; PAL: March 26, 2004
- Genre: Action-adventure
- Mode: Single-player

Scooby-Doo! Mystery Mayhem is a third-person action-adventure video game based on the Scooby-Doo franchise. The game was developed by Artificial Mind and Movement and published by THQ in 2003 for the Game Boy Advance. It was later released for the PlayStation 2, GameCube, and Xbox in 2004.

== Plot ==
When Scooby and the gang discover that someone has released thousands of real ghosts and monsters from a magic book called The Tome of Doom, they race to solve mysteries and put the monsters back into it. The gang explore five locations, including: Hambridge Library, the Milton Brothers Movie Studio, the Gold Mountain western theme park, a bayou, and Sherman-Tech Headquarters in Colorado.

== Gameplay ==
The player controls two characters, Scooby-Doo and Shaggy Rogers, as they progress through five levels, solving mysteries for Mystery Inc. The player can switch between Scooby and Shaggy to utilize their unique abilities, such as Scooby being able to crawl under narrow spaces. Some levels only allow for one playable character. Players find clues within the levels, take the clues to Velma Dinkley, and are then able to defeat monsters by using the Tome of Doom. The book has no effect on human enemies or alligators, which the characters can only avoid. The Tome of Doom can be charged up using magical wisps, which the player can collect along their way when the tome is low on magic. Floating green skulls also provide an endless supply of wisps. The tome also requires the right page in order to capture certain monsters. In some areas, monsters must be defeated in order to remove the force fields blocking the way out. The player characters have a 'cool meter', which when empty, causes the player to lose control of the character. The player can refill this meter by consuming Scooby Snacks or other foods found in the level. Certain food items are counted as collectibles and unlock bonuses if the player finds all of them within a particular level.

== Reception ==
Reception

Aggregate scores
Aggregator	Score
GameRankings	(Xbox) 59.82% (PS2) 59.52% (GC) 55.75% (GBA) 53.20%
Metacritic	(Xbox) 56/100 (PS2) 55/100 (GC) 54/100 (GBA) 53/100

Review scores
Publication	Score
Computer and Video Games	6.8/10
Game Informer	(GBA) 6/10; 4/10
GameSpot	5.6/10
GameZone	6.5/10 (Xbox) 6/10
IGN	5.5/10 (GBA) 5/10
Nintendo Power	(GBA) 3/5 (GC) 2.2/5
Official U.S. PlayStation Magazine	3/5
PALGN	6/10
TeamXbox	7.4/10
X-Play	2/5
The Times	4/5

Scooby-Doo! Mystery Mayhem received "mixed or average" reviews. GameRankings and Metacritic gave it a score of 53.20% and 53 out of 100 for the Game Boy Advance version; 59.82% and 56 out of 100 for the Xbox version; 59.52% and 55 out of 100 for the PlayStation 2 version; and 55.75% and 54 out of 100 for the GameCube version.
