= Looney Tunes and Merrie Melodies filmography (1970–present) =

A total of 38 animated shorts have been released by Warner Bros. Pictures under the Looney Tunes and Merrie Melodies banners since 1970.

== 1970–present ==
=== Theatrical cartoons ===
==== General theatrical releases ====
Title	Director	Characters	Release date	Film shown with	Release location	Availability	Notes
The Duxorcist	Greg Ford, Terry Lennon	Daffy, Thelma	November 20, 1987	First screened independently with any feature film of exhibitor's choice, but was also edited into Daffy Duck's Quackbusters	Los Angeles, New York	DVD - Space Jam (2-disc edition); DVD - The Essential Daffy Duck; DVD - Looney Tunes Parodies Collection; Blu-ray - Daffy Duck's Quackbusters	First cartoon of the modern-day Looney Tunes/Merrie Melodies series.; First cartoon that the Greg Ford/Terry Lennon team worked on.
The Night of the Living Duck	Greg Ford, Terry Lennon	Daffy, Thelma	September 23, 1988	First given a limited run at the New York Film Festival then shown at the beginning of Daffy Duck's Quackbusters	Los Angeles, New York	DVD - Space Jam (2-disc edition); DVD - The Essential Daffy Duck; Blu-ray - Daffy Duck's Quackbusters	Mel Blanc's final short; Branded as a Merrie Melodies short
Box-Office Bunny	Darrell Van Citters	Bugs, Daffy, Elmer	February 8, 1991	The NeverEnding Story II: The Next Chapter	US, Canada, Mexico	DVD - The Looney Looney Looney Bugs Bunny Movie	First Bugs Bunny cartoon since 1964 and first Elmer Fudd cartoon since 1962.
Chariots of Fur	Chuck Jones	Wile E. and Road Runner	December 21, 1994	Richie Rich	US, Canada, Mexico	DVD - Road Runner and Wile E. Coyote: Supergenius Hijinks; DVD - Looney Tunes Parodies Collection	First LT/MM short directed by Chuck Jones since 1964.; First LT/MM short produced by Chuck Jones Film Productions.
Carrotblanca	Douglas McCarthy	Bugs, The Crusher, Daffy, Foghorn, Barnyard, Giovanni Jones, Gossamer, Granny, Miss Prissy, Mugsy, Penelope, Pepé, Pete Puma, Porky, Sam, Sam Sheepdog, Sylvester, Tweety, & Beaky	August 25, 1995	The Amazing Panda Adventure (North America); The Pebble and the Penguin (internationally)	US, Canada, Mexico	DVD - Casablanca (2-disc special edition); DVD - The Essential Bugs Bunny; DVD - Looney Tunes Parodies Collection; Blu-ray - Casablanca (70th Anniversary & certain later releases including Ultra HD Blu-ray; DVD quality)	Features more characters than any other cartoon
Superior Duck	Chuck Jones	Daffy, Foghorn, Marvin, Porky, Taz, Tweety, Road Runner & Wile E. Coyote	August 23, 1996	Carpool	US and its territories	DVD - The Essential Daffy Duck; Blu-ray - Looney Tunes Platinum Collection: Volume 1 (special feature); Blu-ray - Joe's Apartment; DVD & Blu-ray - Daffy Duck's Quackbusters	
Pullet Surprise	Darrell Van Citters	Foghorn, Pete Puma	March 26, 1997	Cats Don't Dance	US and its territories	DVD - The Looney Looney Looney Bugs Bunny Movie; DVD - Looney Tunes Parodies Collection	
Coyote Falls	Matthew O'Callaghan	Wile E. and Road Runner	July 30, 2010	Cats & Dogs: The Revenge of Kitty Galore	Worldwide	DVD - Road Runner and Wile E. Coyote: Supergenius Hijinks; DVD - Looney Tunes: Rabbits Run; DVD & Blu-ray - Cats & Dogs: The Revenge of Kitty Galore	computer-animated; produced by Reel FX Creative Studios
Fur of Flying	Matthew O'Callaghan	Wile E. and Road Runner	September 24, 2010	Legend of the Guardians: The Owls of Ga'Hoole	Worldwide	DVD - Road Runner and Wile E. Coyote: Supergenius Hijinks; DVD - Looney Tunes: Rabbits Run; DVD & Blu-ray - Legend of the Guardians: The Owls of Ga'Hoole	computer-animated; produced by Reel FX Creative Studios
Rabid Rider	Matthew O'Callaghan	Wile E. and Road Runner	December 17, 2010	Yogi Bear	Worldwide	DVD - Road Runner and Wile E. Coyote: Supergenius Hijinks; DVD - Looney Tunes: Rabbits Run; Blu-ray - Yogi Bear	computer-animated; produced by Reel FX Creative Studios
I Tawt I Taw a Puddy Tat	Matthew O'Callaghan	Sylvester, Tweety, Granny	November 18, 2011	Happy Feet Two	US and its territories	DVD - Looney Tunes: Rabbits Run; DVD & Blu-ray - Happy Feet Two	computer-animated; produced by Reel FX Creative Studios
Daffy's Rhapsody	Matthew O'Callaghan	Daffy, Elmer, Bugs (cameo), Taz (cameo), Tweety (cameo), Wile E. Coyote & Road Runner (cameo)	February 10, 2012	Journey 2: The Mysterious Island	Worldwide	Digital - Stars of Space Jam: Looney Tunes Collection	computer-animated; produced by Reel FX Creative Studios
Daffy Season	Todd Wilderman, Hamish Grieve	Daffy, Elmer, Bugs, Lola, Porky, Speedy, Sam	November 6, 2026	The Cat in the Hat	Worldwide	DVD & Blu-ray - The Cat in the Hat	computer-animated; produced by DNEG Animation

==== Limited releases ====
Title	Director	Characters	Release date	Film shown with	Release location	Availability	Notes
Another Froggy Evening	Chuck Jones	Marvin, Michigan	October 6, 1995	Limited release	Los Angeles	DVD - Space Jam (2-disc edition); Blu-ray - Looney Tunes Platinum Collection: Volume 1 (special feature)	
From Hare to Eternity	Chuck Jones	Bugs, Sam, Michigan (cameo)	November 4, 1997	Limited release	Los Angeles	DVD - The Looney Looney Looney Bugs Bunny Movie; DVD - Looney Tunes Parodies Collection; Blu-ray - Looney Tunes Platinum Collection: Volume 1 (special feature); Blu-ray - Joe's Apartment	Simultaneous release.; Final cartoon directed by Chuck Jones.
Father of the Bird	Stephen Fossatti	Sylvester	November 14, 1997	Limited release	Los Angeles	Blu-ray - Looney Tunes Platinum Collection: Volume 1 (special feature)	First Sylvester cartoon since 1966.; Final cartoon to use cels.; Final cartoon to have Chuck Jones involved.; Final cartoon produced by Chuck Jones Film Productions.
Little Go Beep	Spike Brandt	Wile E. and Road Runner	November 6, 2000	Limited release	Los Angeles	DVD & Blu-ray - Daffy Duck's Quackbusters; DVD - Road Runner and Wile E. Coyote: Supergenius Hijinks; DVD - Looney Tunes Parodies Collection	2000 Worldfest Houston International Film Festival
Flash in the Pain	Matthew O'Callaghan	Wile E. and Road Runner, Tweety (cameo), Sylvester (cameo), Granny (cameo)	June 10, 2014	Limited release	2014 Annecy International Animation Film Festival	N/A	computer-animated; produced by Reel FX Creative Studios

=== Originally planned for theatrical release ===
==== Premiered on television ====
Title	Director	Characters	Release date	Availability	Notes
Duck Dodgers and the Return of the 24½th Century	Chuck Jones	Daffy (as Duck Dodgers), Gossamer, Marvin, Porky	November 20, 1980	DVD & Blu-ray - Daffy Duck's Quackbusters; Blu-ray - Looney Tunes Platinum Collection: Volume 1 (special feature); DVD - The Essential Daffy Duck (special feature)	Planned for theatrical release, then changed into a TV format cartoon, edited into the NBC-TV special Daffy Duck's Thanks-for-Giving Special; Re-branded as a Merrie Melodies short
Invasion of the Bunny Snatchers	Greg Ford, Terry Lennon	Bugs, Daffy, Elmer, Sam, Porky ("Porky drum" ending)	August 25, 1992	DVD - Space Jam (2-disc edition, edited); DVD - The Essential Bugs Bunny (uncut); DVD - Looney Tunes Parodies Collection (uncut); Blu-ray - Daffy Duck's Quackbusters	Planned for theatrical release; Edited into the CBS TV special Bugs Bunny's Creature Features
(Blooper) Bunny	Greg Ford, Terry Lennon	Bugs, Daffy, Elmer, Sam	June 13, 1997	DVD - Looney Tunes Golden Collection: Volume 1 (special feature); Blu-ray - Daffy Duck's Quackbusters; Blu-ray - Bugs Bunny 80th Anniversary Collection	Planned for theatrical release, first shown on Cartoon Network; Final cartoon that the Greg Ford/Terry Lennon team worked on.; Produced in 1991; Re-branded as a Merrie Melodies short

==== Premiered on home video ====
All cartoons were produced by Sherry Gunther and Larry Doyle, with the exception of Daffy Duck for President, which was produced by Spike Brandt and Tony Cervone. There were several shorts planned and storyboarded in 2004 but all of them were canceled due to the box-office failure of Looney Tunes: Back in Action.

Title	Director	Characters	Release date	Availability	Notes
Whizzard of Ow	Bret Haaland	Wile E. and Road Runner	November 1, 2003	DVD - Road Runner and Wile E. Coyote: Supergenius Hijinks; Blu-ray - Looney Tunes: Back in Action	Premiered at Wal-Mart stores.
Museum Scream	Dan Povenmire	Sylvester, Tweety, Granny	March 31, 2004	DVD & Blu-ray - Looney Tunes: Back in Action (DVD Australia-only); Blu-ray - Looney Tunes Platinum Collection: Volume 1 (special feature)	Initially planned for theatrical release with Scooby-Doo 2: Monsters Unleashed
Hare and Loathing in Las Vegas	Bill Kopp, Peter Shin	Bugs, Sam	March 31, 2004	DVD - The Essential Bugs Bunny; DVD - Looney Tunes Parodies Collection; DVD & Blu-ray - Looney Tunes: Back in Action (DVD Australia-only)	
Attack of the Drones	Rich Moore	Daffy (as Duck Dodgers)	March 31, 2004	DVD - The Essential Daffy Duck; DVD & Blu-ray - Looney Tunes: Back in Action (DVD Australia-only)	
Cock-A-Doodle Duel	Peter Shin	Foghorn Leghorn	March 31, 2004	DVD & Blu-ray - Looney Tunes: Back in Action (DVD Australia-only)	Initially planned for theatrical release with Scooby-Doo 2: Monsters Unleashed; In one episode of Toon In with Me , it was also initially planned for theatrical release with Clifford's Really Big Movie
My Generation G-G-Gap	Dan Povenmire	Porky	March 31, 2004	DVD & Blu-ray - Looney Tunes: Back in Action (DVD Australia-only)	Initially planned for theatrical release with A Cinderella Story
Daffy Duck for President	Spike Brandt, Tony Cervone	Daffy, Bugs	November 2, 2004	DVD - Looney Tunes Golden Collection: Volume 2 (special feature); DVD - The Essential Daffy Duck (special feature)	Direct-to-DVD short, planned for theatrical release; Based on the book of the same name by Chuck Jones

== Miscellaneous Looney Tunes shorts ==
=== Made-for-TV cartoons ===
Title	Director	Characters	Release date	Availability	Notes
Bugs Bunny's Christmas Carol	Friz Freleng	Bugs, Elmer, Foghorn, Pepé, Petunia, Porky, Sam, Sylvester, Tweety	November 27, 1979	DVD - Looney Tunes Golden Collection: Volume 5 (special feature)	Edited from the CBS TV special Bugs Bunny's Looney Christmas Tales; Bugs Bunny's Christmas Carol and Freeze Frame were re-branded as Merrie Melodies shorts
Freeze Frame	Chuck Jones	Wile E. Coyote and the Road Runner	November 27, 1979	DVD - Looney Tunes Golden Collection: Volume 5 (special feature)	Edited from the CBS TV special Bugs Bunny's Looney Christmas Tales; Bugs Bunny's Christmas Carol and Freeze Frame were re-branded as Merrie Melodies shorts
Fright Before Christmas	Friz Freleng	Bugs, Taz, Clyde, Speedy	November 27, 1979	DVD - Looney Tunes Golden Collection: Volume 5 (special feature); Blu-ray - Looney Tunes Platinum Collection: Volume 1 (special feature)	Edited from the CBS TV special Bugs Bunny's Looney Christmas Tales; Bugs Bunny's Christmas Carol and Freeze Frame were re-branded as Merrie Melodies shorts
The Yolk's on You	Tony Benedict; Gerry Chiniquy; Arthur Davis; Dave Detiege	Daffy, Foghorn, Prissy, Sylvester	April 1, 1980	DVD - Looney Tunes Golden Collection: Volume 6 (special feature); DVD - The Essential Daffy Duck (special feature)	Edited from the NBC TV special Daffy Duck's Easter Show; The Yolk's on You and Daffy Flies North were re-branded as Merrie Melodies shorts
The Chocolate Chase	Friz Freleng	Daffy, Speedy	April 1, 1980	DVD - Looney Tunes Golden Collection: Volume 6 (special feature); DVD - 4 Classic Cartoons promotional DVD; DVD - The Essential Daffy Duck (special feature)	Edited from the NBC TV special Daffy Duck's Easter Show; The Yolk's on You and Daffy Flies North were re-branded as Merrie Melodies shorts
Daffy Flies North	Tony Benedict; Gerry Chiniquy; Arthur Davis; Dave Detiege	Daffy	April 1, 1980	DVD - Looney Tunes Golden Collection: Volume 6 (special feature); DVD - The Essential Daffy Duck (special feature)	Edited from the NBC TV special Daffy Duck's Easter Show; The Yolk's on You and Daffy Flies North were re-branded as Merrie Melodies shorts
Portrait of the Artist as a Young Bunny	Chuck Jones	Bugs, Elmer, Wile E. Coyote and Road Runner (cameo)	May 21, 1980	DVD - Looney Tunes Golden Collection: Volume 5 (special feature); DVD - The Essential Bugs Bunny (special feature)	Edited from the CBS TV special Bugs Bunny's Bustin' Out All Over; Soup or Sonic was re-branded as a Merrie Melodies short
Spaced Out Bunny	Chuck Jones	Bugs, Marvin, Hugo the Abominable Snowman	May 21, 1980	DVD - Looney Tunes Golden Collection: Volume 5 (special feature); DVD - The Essential Bugs Bunny (special feature); Blu-ray - Looney Tunes Platinum Collection: Volume 1 (special feature)	Edited from the CBS TV special Bugs Bunny's Bustin' Out All Over; Soup or Sonic was re-branded as a Merrie Melodies short
Soup or Sonic	Chuck Jones	Wile E. and Road Runner	May 21, 1980	DVD - Looney Tunes Golden Collection: Volume 5 (special feature); DVD - The Essential Bugs Bunny (special feature)	Edited from the CBS TV special Bugs Bunny's Bustin' Out All Over; Soup or Sonic was re-branded as a Merrie Melodies short
Daffy & Porky in the William Tell Overture	Dan Haskett	Daffy, Porky	April 17, 1991	DVD - Looney Tunes Golden Collection: Volume 4 (special feature)	Edited from the CBS TV special Bugs Bunny's Overtures to Disaster; Branded as a Merrie Melodies short on the end card

=== Other shorts ===
Title	Director	Characters	Release date	Availability	Notes
Marvin the Martian in the Third Dimension	Douglas McCarthy	Daffy, Marvin, K-9	June 30, 1996	Blu-ray - Looney Tunes Platinum Collection: Volume 1 (special feature)	Theme park attraction at Warner Bros. Movie World Germany

== Webtoons ==
The following Flash animation shorts were released onto the official Looney Tunes website between 2001 and 2005. Two collections were released on home video in 2003, Stranger than Fiction and Reality Check.

Title	Release date	Series	Availability	Notes
Survival of the Dimmest	May 1, 2001	Toon Marooned	DVD - Looney Tunes: Reality Check	Survivor parody
Beach, Blanket, Bang-O	May 17, 2001	Toon Marooned	DVD - Looney Tunes: Reality Check	Survivor parody
Helter Shelter (Looney Tunes)	May 31, 2001	Toon Marooned	DVD - Looney Tunes: Reality Check	Survivor parody
Finder's Eaters	June 14, 2001	Toon Marooned	DVD - Looney Tunes: Reality Check	Survivor parody
Sandcastle Hassle	June 28, 2001	Toon Marooned	DVD - Looney Tunes: Reality Check	Survivor parody
I've Misplaced My Piano!	July 12, 2001	Toon Marooned	DVD - Looney Tunes: Reality Check	Survivor parody
Speared, Seared and Feared	July 31, 2001	Toon Marooned	DVD - Looney Tunes: Reality Check	Survivor parody
Oh My Darlin' Serpentine	August 14, 2001	Toon Marooned	DVD - Looney Tunes: Reality Check	Survivor parody
Obstacles, of Course	August 28, 2001	Toon Marooned	DVD - Looney Tunes: Reality Check	Survivor parody
Fowl Be Comin' 'Round the Mountain	September 6, 2001	Toon Marooned	DVD - Looney Tunes: Reality Check	Survivor parody
The Matwix	September 20, 2001	N/A	N/A	The Matrix parody
Judge Granny: Case 1: Tweety vs. Sylvester (Cagey Witness)	October 4, 2001	Judge Granny	DVD - Looney Tunes: Reality Check	Judge Judy parody
Twick or Tweety	October 18, 2001	N/A	DVD - Looney Tunes: Stranger Than Fiction	N/A
Judge Granny: Case 2: Coyote vs. Roadrunner (Inherit the Windbag)	November 1, 2001	Judge Granny	DVD - Looney Tunes: Reality Check	Judge Judy parody
Judge Granny: Case 3: Fudd vs. Duck (Fowl Play)	November 15, 2001	Judge Granny	DVD - Looney Tunes: Reality Check	Judge Judy parody
Planet of the Taz	November 29, 2001	Planet of the Taz	DVD - Looney Tunes: Stranger Than Fiction	Planet of the Apes parody
Beneath the Planet of the Taz	December 13, 2001	Planet of the Taz	DVD - Looney Tunes: Stranger Than Fiction	Planet of the Apes parody
Enough With the Planet of the Taz	December 27, 2001	Planet of the Taz	DVD - Looney Tunes: Stranger Than Fiction	Planet of the Apes parody
Tech Suppork	January 10, 2002	N/A	DVD - Looney Tunes: Stranger Than Fiction	N/A
Satellite Sam	February 7, 2002	N/A	DVD - Looney Tunes: Stranger Than Fiction	N/A
Junkyard Run: Part 1	February 21, 2002	Junkyard Run	DVD - Looney Tunes: Reality Check	The Cannonball Run parody
Junkyard Run: Part 2	March 7, 2002	Junkyard Run	DVD - Looney Tunes: Reality Check	The Cannonball Run parody
Junkyard Run: Part 3	March 21, 2002	Junkyard Run	DVD - Looney Tunes: Reality Check	The Cannonball Run parody
Cell Mates	2002	N/A	N/A	This webtoon had the most interactivity, with three different endings based on how often the viewer interacted with it.
Sufferin' Sasquatch	April 4, 2002	Mysterious Phenomena of the Unexplained	DVD - Looney Tunes: Stranger Than Fiction	In Search of... parody
Who Wants to Be a Martian-aire?	April 18, 2002	Mysterious Phenomena of the Unexplained	DVD - Looney Tunes: Stranger Than Fiction	In Search of... parody
Loch Ness Mess	May 2, 2002	Mysterious Phenomena of the Unexplained	DVD - Looney Tunes: Stranger Than Fiction	In Search of... parody
Cropsy Curvy	May 16, 2002	Mysterious Phenomena of the Unexplained	DVD - Looney Tunes: Stranger Than Fiction	In Search of... parody
The Bermuda Short	May 30, 2002	Mysterious Phenomena of the Unexplained	DVD - Looney Tunes: Stranger Than Fiction	In Search of... parody
The Taming of the Screwball	June 13, 2002	Mysterious Phenomena of the Unexplained	DVD - Looney Tunes: Stranger Than Fiction	In Search of... parody
Gone in 30 Minutes	July 11, 2002	The Royal Mallard	DVD - Looney Tunes: Stranger Than Fiction	N/A
Window Pains	July 25, 2002	The Royal Mallard	DVD - Looney Tunes: Stranger Than Fiction	N/A
Daffy's Meet Market	August 8, 2002	The Royal Mallard	DVD - Looney Tunes: Stranger Than Fiction	N/A
Cube Wars	August 22, 2002	The Royal Mallard	DVD - Looney Tunes: Stranger Than Fiction	N/A
Hogs & Kisses	September 5, 2002	The Royal Mallard	DVD - Looney Tunes: Stranger Than Fiction	N/A
¡El Chupacabra!	October 17, 2002	Mysterious Phenomena of the Unexplained	DVD - Looney Tunes: Stranger Than Fiction	In Search of... parody
The Island of Dr. Moron	October 24, 2002	N/A	DVD - Looney Tunes: Stranger Than Fiction	Island of Dr. Moreau parody
Elmer Fudd vs. Yosemite Sam	November 7, 2002	Aluminum Chef	DVD - Looney Tunes: Reality Check	Iron Chef parody
Sylvester Cat vs. Tweety Bird	November 21, 2002	Aluminum Chef	DVD - Looney Tunes: Reality Check	Iron Chef parody
Sports Blab#1	December 5, 2002	Sports Blab	DVD - Looney Tunes: Reality Check	N/A
Sports Blab#2	December 19, 2002	Sports Blab	DVD - Looney Tunes: Reality Check	N/A
Tear Factor	January 2, 2003	N/A	DVD - Looney Tunes: Reality Check	Fear Factor parody
Cat Stays in the Picture	August 2004	N/A	N/A	N/A
H2Uh-Oh!	August 2004	N/A	N/A	N/A
Bunk Bedlam	August 2004	N/A	N/A	N/A
Yosemite Slam	August 2004	N/A	N/A	N/A
Parallel Porked	September 2004	N/A	N/A	N/A
Full Metal Racket	September 2004	N/A	N/A	N/A
Wile E. Coyote Ugly	November 2004	N/A	N/A	N/A
Oh Taz, You Devil!	November 2004	N/A	N/A	N/A
Multiplex Mallard	December 2004	N/A	N/A	N/A
Snow Business	January 2005	N/A	N/A	N/A
Maximum Tazocity	January 2005	N/A	N/A	N/A
Mice Capades	January 2005	N/A	N/A	N/A
Dating Do's and Don'ts: How to Be a "Mr. Good-Date"	February 2005	N/A	N/A	N/A
Daffy Dentist D.D.S.	February 2005	N/A	N/A	N/A
Fast Feud	April 2005	N/A	N/A	N/A
Stunt Duck	April 2005	N/A	N/A	N/A
Psycho Kitty	May 2005	N/A	N/A	N/A
Wild KingDumb	May 2005	N/A	N/A	N/A
Malltown and Tazboy	June 2005	N/A	N/A	N/A
Little Pet Shop of Horrors	June 2005	N/A	N/A	N/A
Grand Master Rabbit	June 2005	N/A	N/A	N/A
Dux's Tux's	July 2005	N/A	N/A	N/A

=== Commercial parodies ===
The following Flash animation shorts were also released onto the official Looney Tunes website.

- "Anvil-O's" (cereal)
- "Caves" (parody of MTV Cribs)
- "D.I.P.S. (Department of Investigations of Paranormal Sightings)"
- "Da Beepo" (2002) (Road Runner's psychic hotline)
- "The Law Firm of Duck, Duck, McKimson & Duck" (law firm)
- "Elmer Fudd's Extreme Wabbit Hunt Wampage 3: Elmer's Wevenge" (2001) (video game)
- "Looney Tunes Cruise Lines"
- "Porky's Pizza Palace"
- "Stone Cold Duck"
- "50/50" (20/20 parody)
- "Twick or Tweety"

=== Looney Tunes: Acme Fools ===
Acme Fools is a web short series where the Looney Tunes cast cosplay as characters and elements from the Warner Bros. media library as part of Warner Bros. 100th anniversary celebrations. They were released on the WB Kids YouTube channel over four weeks from March 27 to April 17, 2023.

- "The Wizard of Oz"
- "DC Superheroes"
- "Scooby Doo, Where Are You!"
- "The Flintstones"

=== WB Kids YouTube channel original series ===
- Looney Tunes Presents: Sports Made Simple
- Looney Tunes Presents: Sports Talk with Bugs Bunny
- Looney Tunes Gokko
