= Bugs Bunny on Broadway =

- (Bugs Bunny at the Symphony)
- Music: Carl Stalling and Milt Franklyn
- Book: George Daugherty
- Basis: Looney Tunes
- Productions: 1990 San Diego; 1990 Broadway; 1990 United States Tour; 1992 International tour 1996 Sydney; 2009 San Francisco; 2010 United States tour 2010 Australian tour 2010 International tour

Bugs Bunny on Broadway (also titled Bugs Bunny at the Symphony and Bugs Bunny at the Symphony II) is a concert musical featuring Looney Tunes characters such as Bugs Bunny, Daffy Duck, and Elmer Fudd. The production was conceived by George Daugherty, incorporating scores by Carl Stalling and Milt Franklyn.

The musical, and its 2010 sequel Bugs Bunny at the Symphony, combines classic Warner Bros. Looney Tunes projected on a large screen accompanied by a live orchestra performing the original score. This production team has been touring the world continuously since 1990 and has played to a total international audience of almost 2 million people.

== History ==
Bugs Bunny premiered in 1990 at the Civic Theatre in San Diego, California. A limited Broadway run of the show played at the George Gershwin Theatre from October 4, 1990, to October 23, 1990, with all performances sold-out in ticket sales. Voice characterizations were by Arthur Q. Bryan and Mel Blanc, with The Warner Brothers Symphony Orchestra. Animation direction was by Chuck Jones, Friz Freleng, Robert McKimson and Robert Clampett.

In 1996, a production played in Sydney, Australia. The original concert toured from 1990 until 2010, appearing with virtually every major American symphony orchestra, and with major symphonic ensembles in Canada, the United Kingdom, Europe, Australia, New Zealand, and Asia.

Among its major achievements were a sold-out week in Moscow's Kremlin Palace, a performance for the British royal family at London's Royal Festival Hall (with the Royal Philharmonic Orchestra), fifteen separate performances at The Hollywood Bowl with the Los Angeles Philharmonic, and a benefit concert with the San Francisco Symphony Orchestra on July 17, 2009.

A revised version, Bugs Bunny at the Symphony, was created by Daugherty and David Ka Lik Wong. It began a United States national tour in July 2010, at the Hollywood Bowl in Los Angeles, played by the Los Angeles Philharmonic, followed by an East Coast premiere with the National Symphony Orchestra at Wolf Trap. An Australian touring production had opened in May 2010 at the Sydney Opera House prior to touring to additional Australian cities, including Adelaide and Perth.

A new international tour premiered in October 2010 with the RTÉ Concert Orchestra in Dublin, Ireland at the Grand Canal Theatre, followed by Asian premieres in 2011 in Taiwan, and with the Malaysian Philharmonic Orchestra at the Petronas Philharmonic Hall in Kuala Lumpur, Malaysia.

== Musical numbers ==
=== Bugs Bunny on Broadway ===
Music and lyrics by Stalling and Franklyn unless otherwise noted.

Act I

- "Overture" - Merrie Melodies Main Title Music
- "This is a Life?"
- "High Note" (music by Johann Strauss II)
- "What's Up Doc?"
- "Baton Bunny" (music by Franz von Suppé)
- "Jumpin' Jupiter"
- "The Rabbit of Seville" (music by Gioacchino Rossini)

Act II

- Act II Entr'Acte - "Orchestral Overture" from "The Beautiful Galatea" and Merrie Melodies Main Theme
- "A Corny Concerto"
- "Long-Haired Hare"
- "What's Opera, Doc?"
- "Merrie Melodies Closing Theme" - "That's all Folks!"

=== Bugs Bunny at the Symphony ===
Music and lyrics by Stalling and Franklyn unless otherwise noted.

Act I

- "Dance of The Comedians" from "The Bartered Bride" (music by Bedřich Smetana)
- "Fanfare" (from Merrie Melodies)
- "Baton Bunny" (music by Franz von Suppé)
- "What's Up, Doc?"
- "Rhapsody Rabbit"
- "I Love to Singa" (music and lyrics by Harold Arlen and E.Y. Harburg)
- "Zoom and Bored"
- "Home Tweet Home"
- "The Rabbit of Seville" (music by Gioacchino Rossini)

Act II

- "Orchestral Overture" from "The Beautiful Galatea" (music by Franz von Suppé)
- "Tom and Jerry in the Hollywood Bowl" (music by Johann Strauss)
- "Scooby-Doo’s Hall of the Mountain King" (from Edvard Grieg's Peer Gynt)
- "Bedrock Ballet" ("Can-Can" from Jacques Offenbach's Orpheus in the Underworld)
- "Corny Concerto"
- "Long-Haired Hare"
- "What's Opera, Doc?"
- "Merrie Melodies Closing Theme" - "That's all Folks!"
- "History of Looney Tunes" (music by Gioacchino Rossini)

=== Bugs Bunny at the Symphony II ===
Music and lyrics by Stalling and Franklyn unless otherwise noted.

Act I

- "Dance of The Comedians" from "The Bartered Bride" (music by Bedřich Smetana)
- "Fanfare" (from Merrie Melodies)
- "Baton Bunny" (music by Franz von Suppé)
- "Show Biz Bugs"
- "Rhapsody Rabbit"
- Tom and Jerry Cartoons: "Johann Mouse" (scenes) and "Tom and Jerry in the Hollywood Bowl" (music by Scott Bradley and Johann Strauss)
- "Back Alley Oproar" (Figaro scene)
- "Zoom and Bored"
- Pepe Le Pew: Le Chanteur Romantique: "For Scent-imental Reasons" (scenes), "A Scent of the Matterhorn" (Tiptoe through the Tulips scene) and "Scentimental Romeo (Baby Face scene)"
- "The Rabbit of Seville" (music by Gioacchino Rossini)

Act II

- "I Tawt I Taw A Puddy Tat"
- "Coyote Falls"
- "Robin Hood Daffy" (scenes)
- "Duck Amuck"
- "Long-Haired Hare" (Leopold scene)
- "What's Opera, Doc?"
- "Merrie Melodies Closing Theme" - "That's all Folks!"

=== Bugs Bunny at the Symphony: 30th Anniversary Edition ===
Act I

- "Ride of the Valkyries" by Richard Wagner
- "Warner Bros. Fanfare" by Max Steiner
- "Merrily We Roll Along" (from Merrie Melodies)
- "Baton Bunny"
- "What's Up, Doc?"
- "Corny Concerto"
- "Long-Haired Hare"
- "Rhapsody Rabbit"
- "Wet Cement" from Looney Tunes Cartoons
- "Zoom and Bored"
- "One Froggy Evening" (Clips)
- "The Rabbit of Seville" (music by Gioacchino Rossini)

Act II

- Wile E. Coyote's 3D Odyssey: "Coyote Falls", "Fur of Flying" and "Rabid Rider"
- "High Note" (music by Johann Strauss II)
- "Duck Amuck" (Clips)
- "What's Opera, Doc?"
- "Merrie Melodies Closing Theme" - "That's all Folks!"
- Encore with "Dynamite Dance" from Looney Tunes Cartoons

== Soundtrack Recordings ==
| Date Released | Venue | Orchestra | Conductor | Notes |
|---|---|---|---|---|
| January 29, 1991 | George Gershwin Theatre, Broadway, New York City | Warner Bros. Symphony Orchestra | George Daugherty | Original Broadway Recording |
| July 13, 2010 | Sydney Opera House, Sydney | Sydney Symphony | George Daugherty | Live Recording |
