= Christopher Lennertz =

American film composer

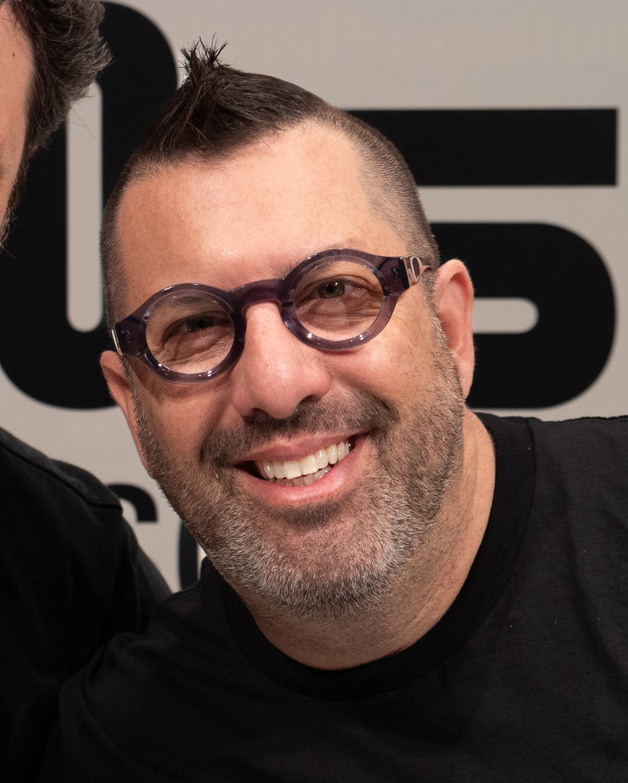
- Lennertz in 2024

Background information
- Born: Christopher Joseph Lennertz; January 2, 1972 (age 54); Methuen, Massachusetts, U.S.
- Genres: Film score; video game score; jazz rock; electronic rock
- Occupations: Composer; conductor; songwriter; lyricist
- Instruments: Piano; keyboards; synthesizer; percussion; guitar
- Years active: 1998–present
- Spouse: Shannon Madden Lennertz (m. 2008)
- Website: christopherlennertz.com

Christopher Joseph Lennertz (born January 2, 1972) is an Emmy-winning American composer, conductor, songwriter, and lyricist. He has composed the scores for films and television shows such as The Boys (2019–2026, created by Eric Kripke), Lost In Space (2018–2021), Ride Along (2014), Horrible Bosses (2011), Barb and Star Go to Vista Del Mar (2021, co-scored with Dara Taylor), and the Medal of Honor video game series created by Steven Spielberg. He additionally composed the scores for Supernatural (2005–2020) and Gen V (2023–2025), both created by Eric Kripke.

He composed the score for Sausage Party (2016) and Galavant (2015–2016) with Alan Menken, as well as the television series Agent Carter, which included a first-ever Marvel musical number co-written by him and David Zippel. He later composed the scores for Sausage Party: Foodtopia, and Uglydolls, which he also wrote the songs for in collaboration with Glenn Slater, featuring recording artists Kelly Clarkson, Janelle Monae, Lizzo, Bebe Rexha, Charli XCX, Nick Jonas, and Blake Shelton.

He won the Creative Arts Emmy in 2025 for Outstanding Original Music and Lyrics for "Let's Put The Christ Back in Christmas" from Season 4 of The Boys on Prime Video. He is currently working on a full-length Rogers: The Musical, originally produced as a one-act (2023) at Avengers Campus at Disney California Adventure Park.

== Early life and education ==
Lennertz was born on January 2, 1972, in Methuen, Massachusetts. He attended Easton Area High School in Easton, Pennsylvania, and then Thornton School of Music at the University of Southern California, where he studied with Academy Award-winner Elmer Bernstein. He was mentored as an assistant, arranger, and orchestrator to legendary composers Basil Poledouris and Michael Kamen, and co-scored Harmony: A New Way of Looking at Our World (2012 documentary) with Dave Grusin.

== Career ==
One of Lennertz's early credits was as an orchestrator for 101 Dalmatians (1996), scored by Michael Kamen. His music for direct-to-video projects and indie films led to Supernatural, created by Eric Kripke, which he scored for its complete 15 seasons. He found his major breakthrough in film composition in 2007 with the jukebox musical comedy Alvin and the Chipmunks, directed by Tim Hill; the album containing his score for the film was released in 2008. Lennertz would go on to collaborate with several directors including Seth Gordon, Tim Story, and Dan Fogelman.

He continued to compose and conduct music for several other blockbuster films, including Marmaduke (2010), Cats & Dogs: The Revenge of Kitty Galore (2011), Hop (2011), Horrible Bosses (2011), Think Like a Man (2012), The Wedding Ringer (2015), and Sausage Party (2016). He composed the score for six Looney Tunes animated short films, directed by Matthew O'Callaghan and animated by Reel FX Creative Studios.

Outside of film scoring, Lennertz composed the score for video games including Medal of Honor, titles such as Rising Sun (2003), Pacific Assault (2004), and European Assault (2005), as well as James Bond games such as From Russia with Love (2005) and 007: Quantum of Solace (2008). Lennertz has also composed the score for television shows, including Supernatural (2005–2020), Agent Carter (2015–2016), Lost in Space (2018–2021), The Boys (2019–present; with Matt Bowen), Gen V (2023–present; with Matt Bowen), and Sausage Party: Foodtopia (2024–present).

== Personal life ==
Lennertz married Shannon Madden Lennertz on August 13, 2008. They had two children together, Tobi (born January 20, 2008) and Vesper (born March 13, 2013).

== Filmography ==
=== Films ===
==== 2000s ====
Year	Title	Director(s)	Studio(s)	Notes
2000	Buzz Lightyear of Star Command: The Adventure Begins	Tad Stones	Walt Disney Television Animation; Pixar Animation Studios	Direct-to-video; as orchestrator and additional music only; score by Adam Berry
2000	A Diva's Christmas Carol	Richard Schenkman	VH1	Television film
2002	Saint Sinner	Joshua Butler	Syfy	Television film
2004	Soul Plane	Jessy Terrero	Metro-Goldwyn-Mayer	
2005	Confessions of an Action Star	Brad Martin	Lightyear Entertainment	
2005	Three Wise Guys	Robert Iscove	USA Network	Television film
2006	Dr. Dolittle 3	Rich Thorne	20th Century Fox Home Entertainment	Direct-to-video film
2006	Shark Bait	Howard E. Baker; John Fox	The Weinstein Company	First score for an animated film
2007	Tortilla Heaven	Judy Hecht Dumontet	Archangel Releasing	
2007	The Comebacks	Tom Brady	Fox Atomic	
2007	The Perfect Holiday	Lance Rivera	Destination Films; Yari Film Group	
2007	Alvin and the Chipmunks	Tim Hill	20th Century Fox	First collaboration with Tim Hill
2008	Meet the Spartans	Jason Friedberg; Aaron Seltzer	20th Century Fox	First collaboration with Jason Friedberg and Aaron Seltzer
2008	Disaster Movie	Jason Friedberg; Aaron Seltzer	Lionsgate Films	Second collaboration with Jason Friedberg and Aaron Seltzer
2009	Adam	Max Mayer	Fox Searchlight Pictures	
2009	The Open Road	Michael Meredith	Anchor Bay Entertainment	
2009	The Horde	Benjamin Rocher; Yannick Dahan	Canal+	

==== 2010s ====
Year	Title	Director(s)	Studio(s)	Notes
2010	Marmaduke	Tom Dey	20th Century Fox	
2010	Cats & Dogs: The Revenge of Kitty Galore	Brad Peyton	Warner Bros. Pictures	
2010	Coyote Falls	Matthew O'Callaghan	Warner Bros. Animation; Reel FX Creative Studios	Short film; released with Cats & Dogs: The Revenge of Kitty Galore
2010	Vampires Suck	Jason Friedberg; Aaron Seltzer	20th Century Fox	Third collaboration with Jason Friedberg and Aaron Seltzer
2010	Camp Rock 2: The Final Jam	Paul Hoen	Disney Channel	Television film
2010	Fur of Flying	Matthew O'Callaghan	Warner Bros. Animation; Reel FX Creative Studios	Short film; released with Legend of the Guardians: The Owls of Ga'Hoole
2010	Rabid Rider	Matthew O'Callaghan	Warner Bros. Animation; Reel FX Creative Studios	Short film; released with Yogi Bear
2011	Hop	Tim Hill	Illumination Entertainment	Second collaboration with Tim Hill
2011	Lemonade Mouth	Patricia Riggen	Disney Channel	Television film
2011	Horrible Bosses	Seth Gordon	Warner Bros. Pictures; New Line Cinema	First collaboration with Seth Gordon
2011	I Tawt I Taw a Puddy Tat	Matthew O'Callaghan	Warner Bros. Animation; Reel FX Creative Studios	Short film; adaptation score only; song by Billy May, Warren Foster and Michael Maltese; released with Happy Feet Two
2011	The Smurfs: A Christmas Carol	Troy Quane	Sony Pictures Animation	Short film; released as part of The Smurfs three-disc holiday gift set
2012	Daffy's Rhapsody	Matthew O'Callaghan	Warner Bros. Animation; Reel FX Creative Studios	Short film; adaptation score only; song by Billy May, Warren Foster and Michael Maltese; released with Journey 2: The Mysterious Island
2012	Think Like a Man	Tim Story	Screen Gems	First collaboration with Tim Story
2012	Thanks for Sharing	Stuart Blumberg	Lionsgate	
2012	Girl in Progress	Patricia Riggen	Pantelion Films; Lionsgate	
2012	Item 47	Louis D'Esposito	Marvel Studios	Marvel One-Shot direct-to-video short film; inspired the TV series of the same name
2013	Identity Thief	Seth Gordon	Universal Pictures	Second collaboration with Seth Gordon
2013	Remember Sunday	Jeff Bleckner	Hallmark Hall of Fame	Television film
2013	As Cool as I Am	Max Moyer	IFC Films	
2013	Agent Carter	Louis D'Esposito	Marvel Studios	Marvel One-Shot direct-to-video short film; inspired the TV series of the same name
2013	The Smurfs: The Legend of Smurfy Hollow	Stephen Franck	Sony Pictures Animation	Direct-to-video short film
2013	Battle of the Year	Benson Lee	Screen Gems	
2013	Gimme Shelter	Patricia Riggen	Lionsgate; Pantelion Films	
2014	Ride Along	Tim Story	Universal Pictures	Second collaboration with Tim Story
2014	Flash in the Pain	Matthew O'Callaghan	Warner Bros. Animation; Reel FX Creative Studios	
2014	Think Like a Man Too	Tim Story	Screen Gems	Third collaboration with Tim Story
2014	Horrible Bosses 2	Sean Anders	Warner Bros. Pictures; New Line Cinema	
2015	The Wedding Ringer	Jeremy Garelick	Screen Gems; Miramax Films	
2016	Ride Along 2	Tim Story	Universal Pictures	Featuring Shelia E & Arturo Sandoval; additional music provided by Alexander Bornstein, Matt Bowen & Jess Stroup; Fourth collaboration with Tim Story
2016	My Big Fat Greek Wedding 2	Kirk Jones	Universal Pictures	
2016	The Boss	Ben Falcone	Universal Pictures	
2016	Bad Moms	Jon Lucas; Scott Moore	STX Entertainment	Featuring Soloist by KT Tunstall
2016	Sausage Party	Greg Tiernan; Conrad Vernon	Columbia Pictures; Nitrogen Studios	R-rated animated film; composed with Alan Menken
2016	Kevin Hart: What Now?	Leslie Small; Tim Story	Universal Pictures	Fifth collaboration with Tim Story
2017	Smurfs: The Lost Village	Kelly Asbury	Sony Pictures Animation	Additional music provided by Philip White; First collaboration with Kelly Asbury
2017	Baywatch	Seth Gordon	Paramount Pictures	Additional music provided by Alexander Bornstein, Joshua R. Mosley, Nathan Rightour & Zack Ryan; Third collaboration with Seth Gordon
2017	Boo 2! A Madea Halloween	Tyler Perry	Tyler Perry Studios	Themes only; score composed by Philip White
2017	A Bad Moms Christmas	Jon Lucas Scott Moore	STX Entertainment	
2017	El Camino Christmas	David E. Talbert	Netflix	
2017	Pitch Perfect 3	Trish Sie	Universal Pictures	
2018	Acrimony	Tyler Perry	Tyler Perry Studios	
2018	Uncle Drew	Charles Stone III	Summit Entertainment; Temple Hill Entertainment	
2018	The Happytime Murders	Brian Henson	STX Entertainment	
2018	Nobody's Fool	Tyler Perry	Tyler Perry Studios	Score producer only; score composed by Phillip White
2019	A Madea Family Funeral	Tyler Perry	Tyler Perry Studios	Themes only; score composed by Phillip White
2019	UglyDolls	Kelly Asbury	STX Entertainment	Also wrote songs with Glenn Slater; Second collaboration with Kelly Asbury
2019	Shaft	Tim Story	Warner Bros. Pictures; New Line Cinema	Additional music provided by Alexander Bornstein, Dara Taylor & Stu Thomas; Sixth collaboration with Tim Story
2019	Jexi	Jon Lucas; Scott Moore	Lionsgate	Composed with Philip White

==== 2020s ====
Year	Title	Director(s)	Studio(s)	Notes
2021	Tom & Jerry	Tim Story	Warner Animation Group	Seventh collaboration with Tim Story
2021	Barb and Star Go to Vista Del Mar	Josh Greenbaum	Gloria Sanchez Productions	Composed with Dara Taylor
2021	The Loud House Movie	Dave Needham	Nickelodeon Movies	Themes only. Score by Philip White
2022	13: The Musical	Tamra Davis	Zadan/Meron Productions	Song lyrics by Jason Robert Brown
2022	The Curse of Bridge Hollow	Jeff Wadlow	Ugly Baby Productions	
2023	Dashing Through the Snow	Tim Story	Walt Disney Pictures	Eighth collaboration with Tim Story
2025	Back in Action	Seth Gordon	Chernin Entertainment	
2025	The Pickup	Tim Story	Amazon MGM Studios	Ninth collaboration with Tim Story
2026	72 Hours	Tim Story	Netflix	Tenth collaboration with Tim Story

=== Television ===
Year	Title	TV Channel	Notes
1999	Brimstone	Fox	
2000	The Strip	UPN	
2005–2020	Supernatural	The WB (2005–2006); The CW (2006–2020)	Composed with Jay Gruska
2012–2014	Revolution	NBC	
2015–2016	Galavant	ABC	Composed with Alan Menken; Song lyrics by Glenn Slater
2015–2016	Agent Carter	ABC	
2018–2021	Lost in Space	Netflix	Original Lost in Space Theme by John Williams
2018	Best.Worst.Weekend.Ever.	Netflix	Composed with Matt Bowen
2019–2026	The Boys	Amazon Prime Video	Composed with Matt Bowen
2022–present	Fraggle Rock: Back to the Rock	Apple TV+	
2023	Gen V	Amazon Prime Video	Composed with Matt Bowen
2024–2025	Sausage Party: Foodtopia	Amazon Prime Video	Composed with Alexander Bornstein (season 2 only)
2027	Vought Rising	Amazon Prime Video	Composed with Matt Bowen

=== Video games ===
Year	Title	Publisher	Notes
2003	Medal of Honor: Rising Sun	EA Games	Original Medal of Honor theme by Michael Giacchino
2004	Medal of Honor: Pacific Assault	EA Games	Original Medal of Honor theme by Michael Giacchino
2005	Medal of Honor: European Assault	EA Games	Original Medal of Honor theme by Michael Giacchino
2005	From Russia with Love	Electronic Arts	
2005	Gun	Activision	
2007	The Simpsons Game	Electronic Arts	Additional music composed with Tim Wynn; score composed by Hans Zimmer and James Dooley
2007	Warhawk	Sony Computer Entertainment	Composed with Tim Wynn
2008	Quantum of Solace	Activision	
2009	The Godfather II	Electronic Arts	
2010	Mass Effect 2: Overlord	Electronic Arts	Downloadable content for Mass Effect 2
2010	Mass Effect 2: Lair of the Shadow Broker	Electronic Arts	Downloadable content for Mass Effect 2
2011	The Sims 3: Pets	Electronic Arts	Expansion pack for The Sims 3
2012	Mass Effect 3	Electronic Arts	Composed with Sascha Dikiciyan, Clint Mansell, Cris Velasco, and Sam Hulick
2012	Starhawk	Sony Computer Entertainment	
2013	Madden NFL 25	EA Sports	
Cancelled	Scalebound	Microsoft Studios	Project cancelled in 2017; Composed with Hitomi Kurokawa and Naoto Tanaka

=== Other credits ===
Year	Title	Notes
2023	Rogers: The Musical	Score composed and lyrics written with Alan Menken, Marc Shaiman, David Zippel, Scott Wittman, Jordan Peterson and Alex Karukas; Themes by Alan Silvestri

== Awards and nominations ==
Award	Date of ceremony	Category	Recipient	Result
Annie Awards	February 17, 2024	Outstanding Achievement for Music in an Animated Television/Broadcast Production	Pacemaker	Nominated
BMI Film & TV Awards	May 21, 2008	Film Music Award	Alvin and the Chipmunks	Won
BMI Film & TV Awards	May 19, 2011	Film Music Award	Hop	Won
BMI Film & TV Awards	May 15, 2013	TV Music Award	Revolution	Won
BMI Film & TV Awards	May 15, 2013	Film Music Award	Think Like a Man	Won
BMI Film & TV Awards	May 15, 2013	Film Music Award	Identity Thief	Won
BMI Film & TV Awards	July 12, 2021	Streaming Series Award	The Boys	Won
BMI Film & TV Awards	May 14, 2025	Streaming Series Award	The Boys	Won
Creative Arts Emmy Awards	August 19, 2006	Outstanding Music Composition for a Series (Original Dramatic Score)	Supernatural (Episode: "Pilot")	Nominated
Creative Arts Emmy Awards	September 11–12, 2021	Outstanding Original Music and Lyrics	The Boys (Episode: "The Big Ride"); Song Title: "Never Truly Vanish"	Nominated
Creative Arts Emmy Awards	September 6–7, 2025	Outstanding Original Music and Lyrics	The Boys (Episode: "We'll Keep the Red Flag Flying Here"); Song Title: "Let's Put the Christ Back in Christmas"	Won
Creative Arts Emmy Awards	September 5–6, 2026	Outstanding Original Music and Lyrics	The Boys (Episode:"The Frenchman, the Female, and the Man Called Mother's Milk"); Song Title: "Raise Him Up"	Nominated
Interactive Achievement Awards	March 4, 2004	Outstanding Achievement in Original Music Composition	Medal of Honor: Rising Sun	Won
IFMCA Awards	February 20, 2008	Best Original Score for a Video Game or Interactive Media	Warhawk (with Timothy Michael Wynn)	Nominated
IFMCA Awards	February 25, 2011	Best Original Score for a Comedy Film	Vampires Suck	Nominated

== See also ==
- Music of the Marvel Cinematic Universe
