= Daffy's Rhapsody =

2012 film by Matthew O'Callaghan

- Poster
- Directed by: Matthew O'Callaghan
- Written by: Tom Sheppard
- Story by: Matthew O'Callaghan
- Produced by: Spike Brandt; Tony Cervone
- Starring: Mel Blanc (archival recordings); Billy West
- Music by: Christopher Lennertz (adaptation score); Billy May, Warren Foster and Michael Maltese (song)
- Color process: Deluxe
- Production companies: Reel FX Creative Studios; Warner Bros. Animation
- Distributed by: Warner Bros. Pictures
- Release date: February 10, 2012 (with Journey 2: The Mysterious Island)
- Running time: 4 minutes
- Country: United States
- Language: English

Daffy's Rhapsody is a 2012 animated Looney Tunes short film featuring the characters Daffy Duck and Elmer Fudd. Directed by Matthew O'Callaghan and written by Tom Sheppard, the film is an adaptation of the song of the same name which was sung by Mel Blanc and recorded in the 1950s by Capitol Records. Daffy's Rhapsody was first shown in theaters before Warner Bros.' feature-length film Journey 2: The Mysterious Island. Unlike the previous Looney Tunes 3-D shorts, Daffy's Rhapsody was not immediately released on home media. In 2016, the short was uploaded to the official Warner Bros. Animation YouTube channel but eventually removed, leaving unofficial uploads of the short being available. It took until 2021 for the short to be officially available to purchase on iTunes as part of Stars of Space Jam: Looney Tunes Collection.

== Plot ==
Elmer Fudd goes to see an anti-duck hunting musical named "Requiem for a Hunt: The Musical" starring Daffy Duck, to which upon seeing Daffy, his hunter instincts kick in and he chases Daffy. Meanwhile, Daffy, who is singing to the tune of Hungarian Rhapsody No. 2, is initially unaware of Elmer but soon realizes the danger and romps throughout the stage as Elmer attempts to shoot him, but the latter is ultimately crushed by a backdrop. Daffy bows to the raucously cheering audience, but the "That's All, Folks!" screen is suddenly shot at as Elmer continues hunting for the now-escaping Daffy.

== Voice cast ==
- Mel Blanc (archival recordings) as Daffy Duck
- Billy West as Elmer Fudd

== Production ==
In the early 1990s, Greg Ford and Mark Kausler planned and pitched an adaptation of the novelty song "Daffy Duck's Rhapsody", sung by Mel Blanc and based on "Hungarian Rhapsody No. 2" by Franz Liszt.

Years later, following the production of Coyote Falls, Fur of Flying and Rabid Rider, Warner Bros. president Sam Register entered writer and director Matthew O'Callaghan's office, where he shared a CD of novelty songs and stories recorded by Blanc. Register had plans of creating animated shorts based on the songs, combining the Looney Tunes characters with CGI animation. After listening to the songs and watching the classic Looney Tunes and Merrie Melodies cartoons, O'Callaghan decided to make shorts based on "I Taut I Taw a Puddy-Tat" and "Daffy Duck's Rhapsody".

The short was produced by Reel FX Creative Studios and completed in 2011, animated by Douglas Bell, Ernesto Bottger, Rod Douglas, Eric Drobile, Avner Engel, Bryan Engram, Shaun Freeman, Troy Griffin, Tim Hatcher, T. Daniel Hofstedt, Joseph P. Johnston, Matt Kummer, Steve Lambe, Stephen Orsini, Chad Stewart, Doris Wang, and Trevor Young.

Blanc's vocal track was separated from the original recording and remastered for the short, with the score being adapted by Christopher Lennertz. Billy West was brought in to reprise his role as Elmer Fudd; West had an admiration for Blanc, having met him in the early 1980s.

== Release ==
=== Theatrical ===
This short was initially scheduled to be released in theaters before Happy Feet Two in 2011, but Warner Bros. decided that I Tawt I Taw a Puddy Tat was more suitable for such a film starring penguins. Daffy's Rhapsody instead premiered alongside Journey 2: The Mysterious Island in 2012.

=== Home media ===
On August 14, 2021, Warner Bros. released the short digitally on iTunes and Microsoft Movies and TV on Stars of Space Jam: Looney Tunes Collection, making it the first official home video release of the short.
