= A Hitch in Time =

A Hitch in Time may refer to:

- A Hitch in Time, a 2024 anthology of writings by Christopher Hitchens
- A Hitch in Time, a 1955 Looney Tunes animated film short
- A Hitch in Time, a 1978 British film made by the Children's Film Foundation
