= Warner Bros. Animation =

Main animation studio owned by Warner Bros.

Warner Bros. Animation Inc.
- Logo used since 2010
- Type: Division
- Industry: Animation
- Predecessors: Warner Bros. Cartoons (1933–1969); Hanna-Barbera (1957–2001)
- Founded: March 15, 1980; 46 years ago
- Founder: Hal Geer
- Headquarters: 15301 Ventura Blvd, Sherman Oaks, Los Angeles, California, U.S. (1989–2007); 411 North Hollywood Way, Burbank, California, U.S. (2007–2023); 100 South California Street, Burbank, California, U.S. (2023–present)
- Key people: Michael Ouweleen (president); Matt Matzkin (EVP/GM); Peter Girardi (EVP, alternative programming/adult); Jay Bastian (SVP, current series); Audrey Diehl (SVP, kids/family); Jason DeMarco (SVP, action/anime series); Sammy Perlmutter (SVP, long form/specials)
- Products: Television series; Feature films; Short films; Specials
- Parent: Skydance Television Animation
- Divisions: Cartoon Network Studios; Hanna-Barbera Studios Europe

Warner Bros. Animation Inc. (abbreviated as WBA) is an American animation studio and the main animation division and label of Warner Bros. It was established on March 15, 1980.

As the successor to Warner Bros. Cartoons, which was active from 1933 to 1969, the studio is closely associated with the Looney Tunes and Merrie Melodies characters, among others. Warner Bros. re-established its animation division in 1980 to produce Looney Tunes–related works. Turner Broadcasting System merged with Time Warner in 1996, and Turner's acquired studio, Hanna-Barbera, was absorbed into this studio in March 2001.

Warner Bros. Animation has specialized in producing television and direct-to-video animation featuring characters from other properties owned by Warner Bros., including Turner Entertainment Co. (which owns the rights to properties originally created by the MGM cartoon studio), Hanna-Barbera, Ruby-Spears and DC Entertainment.

== History ==
=== 1970–1986: Restarting the studio ===
The original Warner Bros. Cartoons studio, as well as all of Warner Bros.'s short subject production divisions, closed its doors on October 10, 1969, due to the rising costs and declining returns of short subject production. Outside animation companies were hired to produce new Looney Tunes-related animation for TV specials and commercials at irregular intervals. In 1975, Warner Bros. Cartoons alumnus Chuck Jones began producing a series of Looney Tunes specials at his Chuck Jones Productions animation studio, the first of which was Carnival of the Animals. These specials, and a 1975 Looney Tunes retrospective feature film titled Bugs Bunny: Superstar (distributed by United Artists, the previous owner of the pre-1950 Warner Bros. library), led Jones to produce The Bugs Bunny/Road Runner Movie for Warner Bros. Pictures in 1979. This film blended classic Looney Tunes/Merrie Melodies shorts with newly produced wraparounds of Bugs Bunny introducing each cartoon. Warner Bros. responded to the success of this film by reestablishing its own cartoon studio.

Warner Bros. Animation opened its doors on March 15, 1980, to produce compilation films and television specials starring the Looney Tunes characters. The studio's initial head was Hal Geer, who had been the original studio's sound effects editor during its final days, and he was soon joined by Friz Freleng, who left DePatie–Freleng (which became Marvel Productions after being sold to Marvel Comics), and returned to Warner as executive producer. The new wraparounds for The Looney Looney Looney Bugs Bunny Movie (1981), Bugs Bunny's 3rd Movie: 1001 Rabbit Tales (1982) and Daffy Duck's Fantastic Island (1983) featured footage by a new Warner Bros. Animation staff, composed mainly of veterans from the golden age of WB cartoons, including writers John Dunn and Dave Detiege.

By 1986, Freleng had departed, and Hal Geer also stepped down the following year. Geer was briefly replaced by Steven S. Greene, who in turn was replaced by Freleng's former secretary Kathleen Helppie-Shipley, who would spearhead a major revival of the Looney Tunes brand in the years that followed. The studio continued production on special projects starring the Looney Tunes characters, sporadically producing new Looney Tunes/Merrie Melodies shorts for theaters such as The Duxorcist (1987), Night of the Living Duck (1988), Box-Office Bunny (1990), and Carrotblanca (1995). Many of these shorts, as well as the new footage in the compilation film Daffy Duck's Quackbusters (which includes The Duxorcist), were directed by Greg Ford and Terry Lennon, as well as Darrell Van Citters.

=== 1986–1996: Moving into television animation ===
Warner Bros. Television Animation
- Type: Label
- Industry: Television animation Television production
- Founded: 1986; 40 years ago in Burbank, California
- Defunct: 2003; 23 years ago
- Fate: Reverted back to Warner Bros. Animation
- Successor: Warner Bros. Animation
- Area served: Worldwide
- Parent: Warner Bros.

Beginning in 1986, Warner Bros. moved into regular television animation production. Warners' television division was established by WB Animation President Jean MacCurdy, who brought in producer Tom Ruegger and much of his staff from Hanna-Barbera Productions' A Pup Named Scooby-Doo series (1988–1991). A studio for the television unit was set up in the office tower of the Imperial Bank Building adjacent to the Sherman Oaks Galleria northwest of Los Angeles. Darrell Van Citters, who used to work at Disney, would work at Warner Bros. on the newer Bugs Bunny shorts, before leaving to form Renegade Animation in 1992. The first Warner Bros. original animated TV series Tiny Toon Adventures (1990–1995) was produced in conjunction with Amblin Entertainment, and featured young cartoon characters based upon specific Looney Tunes stars, and was a success. Later Amblin/Warner Bros. television shows, including Animaniacs (1993–1998), its spin-off Pinky and the Brain (1995–1998), and Freakazoid! (1995–1997) followed in continuing the Looney Tunes tradition of cartoon humor.

Warner Bros. Animation also began developing shows based upon comic book characters owned by sister company DC Comics. These programs, including Batman: The Animated Series (1992–1995), Superman: The Animated Series (1996–2000), The New Batman Adventures (1997–1999), Batman Beyond (1999–2001), and Justice League/Justice League Unlimited (2001–2006) proved popular among both children and adults. These shows were part of the DC animated universe. A Batman spin-off feature, Mask of the Phantasm, was produced in 1993 and bumped up to theatrical release. The film was critically acclaimed but performed poorly at the box-office, though it eventually became a commercial success through its subsequent home video releases. In 2003, Warner Bros. Television Animation was folded and was subsequently merged with Warner Bros. Animation.

The group was regrouped into three units, Warner Bros. Classic Animation led by Katherine Helppie-Shipley, Warner Bros. Television Animation and Warner Bros. Feature Animation, as well as an outsourcing deal Warner Bros. Animation's group had with Chuck Jones Film Productions, an independent production company led by ex-Warner Bros. animator Chuck Jones, founded in 1993, and the company was dissolved in 1996.

==== 1990–2004: Warner Bros. Feature Animation ====
Warner Bros. Feature Animation
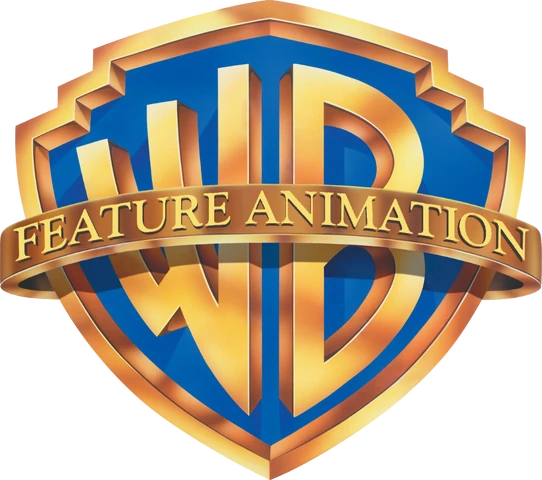
- Type: Division
- Industry: Feature animation
- Predecessor: Turner Feature Animation
- Founded: 1994; 32 years ago in Burbank, California
- Defunct: 2004; 22 years ago
- Fate: Folded into Warner Bros. Animation
- Successor: Warner Bros. Pictures Animation
- Area served: Worldwide
- Parent: Warner Bros.

During the rise of the animation renaissance in the early 1990s, Warner Bros. distributed its first animated films: The Nutcracker Prince in 1990, which is a Canadian-produced feature film based on E. T. A. Hoffmann's classic holiday tale The Nutcracker and the Mouse King; and Rover Dangerfield in 1991, whose title character is a dog whose look and mannerisms are inspired by his voice actor Rodney Dangerfield. Both films received negative reviews and umderperformed at the box office due to lack of promotion. Three years later after the release of Rover Dangerfield, Warner distributed Don Bluth's Thumbelina, which also received mixed reviews from critics and underperformed at the box office.

That same year, Warner Bros., as well as several other Hollywood studios, moved into feature animation following the success of Walt Disney Feature Animation's The Lion King. Max Howard, a Disney alumnus, was brought in to head the new division, which was set up in Sherman Oaks near the television studio in nearby Glendale.

The first of Warner's animated features was Space Jam (1996), a live-action/animated hybrid which starred NBA star Michael Jordan and Bugs Bunny (Jordan had previously appeared with the Looney Tunes in a number of Nike commercials). The film featured live-action sequences directed by Joe Pytka and animated sequences directed by Bruce W. Smith and Tony Cervone. Space Jam received mixed reviews from critics but proved to be a success at the box office. Animation production for Space Jam was primarily done at the new Sherman Oaks studio, although much of the work was outsourced to animation studios around the world.

Two years later, its second film, Frederik Du Chau's Quest for Camelot (1998), underwent production difficulties and also received mixed reviews from critics and underperformed at the box office. However, its soundtrack (such as one of the songs, "The Prayer") received some praise and accolades, including an Oscar nomination and a Golden Globe win.

The third animated feature from Warner Bros. Feature Animation, Brad Bird's The Iron Giant (1999), received widespread acclaim from critics and audiences. However, the studio decided to rush its release to the end of the summer with a rushed marketing push, resulting it flopping at the box office.

The studio's next and fourth film, Osmosis Jones (2001), was another animated/live-action mix that suffered through another troubled production. This time, the animation sequences, directed by Piet Kroon and Tom Sito, were completed long before the live-action parts were filmed, eventually directed by Bobby and Peter Farrelly and starring Bill Murray. The resulting film received mixed reviews and underperformed, although it was successful enough on home video for Warner's Television Animation department to produce a related Saturday morning cartoon, Ozzy & Drix (2002–2004) for its WB broadcast network.

Following the releases of The Iron Giant and Osmosis Jones, the feature animation staff was scaled back, and the entire animation staff – feature and television – were moved to the larger Sherman Oaks facility.

Warner Bros. Feature Animation's fifth and final project, Looney Tunes: Back in Action was released in 2003. It was intended to be the starting point for a reestablishment of the classic cartoons brands, including a planned series of new Looney Tunes theatrical shorts, produced by Back in Action writer and producer Larry Doyle. After Back in Action, directed by Joe Dante (live-action) and Eric Goldberg (animation), received mixed reviews from critics and underperformed at the box office, production was shut down on the new shorts, and, in 2004, Warner Bros. Feature Animation was folded into Warner Bros. Animation, and Looney Tunes has been mostly relegated to television until 2021's Space Jam: A New Legacy.

Filmography
Title	Release date	Director(s)	Writer(s)		Producer(s)	Co-production with	Animation services	Budget	Gross
Title	Release date	Director(s)	Story	Screenplay	Producer(s)	Co-production with	Animation services	Budget	Gross
Space Jam^{[S]}	November 15, 1996	Live Action: Joe Pytka; Animation: Bruce W. Smith; Tony Cervone	Leo Benvenuti; Steve Rudnick; Timothy Harris; Herschel Weingrod		Joe Medjuck; Daniel Goldberg; Ivan Reitman	Warner Bros. Family Entertainment; Northern Lights Entertainment	Main facility Bardel Entertainment; Stardust Pictures; Heart of Texas Productions; Character Builders; Chuck Gammage Animation; Premier Films Ltd. Rees / Leiva Productions; Spaff Animation; Uli Meyer Features	$80 million	$250.2 million
Quest for Camelot	May 15, 1998	Frederik Du Chau	Kirk DeMicco; William Schifrin; Jacqueline Feather; David Seidler		Dalisa Cohen	Warner Bros. Family Entertainment	California and London WBFA facility Yowza! Animation; A. Film A/S; Heart of Texas Productions	$40 million	$38.1 million
The Iron Giant	August 6, 1999	Brad Bird		Tim McCanlies	Allison Abbate; Des McAnuff	—N/a	Main faculties A. Film A/S (uncredited); Duncan Studios (Signature Edition)	$70–80 million	$31.3 million
Osmosis Jones^{[S]}	August 10, 2001	Live-action: Bobby Farrelly; Peter Farrelly; Animation: Piet Kroon; Tom Sito	Marc Hyman		Dennis Edwards; Bobby Farrelly; Peter Farrelly; Zak Penn; Bradley Thomas	Conundrum Entertainment	Main faculties A. Film A/S (uncredited); Yowza! Animation	$70 million	$14 million
Looney Tunes: Back in Action^{[S]}	November 14, 2003	Live-action: Joe Dante; Animation: Eric Goldberg	Larry Doyle		Paula Weinstein; Bernie Goldman	Baltimore Spring Creek Productions; Goldmann Pictures; Lonely Film Productions GmbH & Co. KG	Main faculties Yowza! Animation; Mercury Filmworks	$80 million	$68.5 million

^{S} Combines live-action with animation.

=== 1996–2019: Acquisitions of libraries ===
Warner Bros.' parent company Time Warner merged with Turner Broadcasting System in 1996, not only regaining the rights to the previously sold Looney Tunes and Merrie Melodies shorts but also taking on two more animation studios: Turner Feature Animation and Hanna-Barbera Productions. Turner Feature was immediately folded into Warner Bros. Feature Animation, while Hanna-Barbera merged with Warner Bros. Animation itself. Until 1998, Hanna-Barbera operated on its original lot at 3400 Cahuenga Boulevard in Hollywood, California, one of the last "big name" studios with a Hollywood zip code. Studio operations, archives, and its extensive animation art collection were then moved northwest to Sherman Oaks. Hanna-Barbera occupied space in the office tower adjacent to the Sherman Oaks Galleria along with Warner Bros. Animation.

Following the death of William Hanna in 2001, Warner Bros. took over production of Hanna-Barbera related properties such as Scooby-Doo, producing a steady stream of Scooby direct-to-video films and two new series, What's New, Scooby-Doo? (2002–2006) and Shaggy & Scooby-Doo Get a Clue! (2006–2008). The Turner merger also gave Warner Bros. access to the pre-May 1986 Metro-Goldwyn-Mayer library, which included its classic cartoon library (including such characters as Tom and Jerry (originally created by the H-B duo), Droopy, Barney Bear, Screwy Squirrel, and George and Junior). WBA has since co-produced a series of direct-to-video films with Turner which starred Tom and Jerry. Besides producing content for the daytime market, Warner Bros. Animation also produced Baby Blues with sister company Warner Bros. Television and 3-South with MTV Animation for primetime.

The series which Hanna-Barbera had been producing for Turner's Cartoon Network before and during the Time Warner/Turner merger were shifted to production at Cartoon Network Studios, a sister company to Warner Bros. Animation. WBA is today exclusively involved in the production of animated television programming and direct-to-video features. It produced many of the shows airing on the Kids' WB Saturday morning programming block of The CW until May 24, 2008. These programs included Shaggy & Scooby-Doo Get a Clue!, Krypto the Superdog, Xiaolin Showdown, The Batman, Loonatics Unleashed, and Tom and Jerry Tales. By 2007, the studio had downsized significantly from its size during the late 1990s. Warner Bros. downsized the studio further in June, shut down the Sherman Oaks studio, and had Warner Bros. Animation moved to the Warner Bros. Ranch in Burbank, California. In early 2008 after the demise of Kids' WB!, Warner Bros. Animation became almost dormant with only Batman: The Brave and the Bold in production at the time.

To expand the company's online content presence, Warner Bros. Animation launched the new KidsWB.com (announced as T-Works) on April 28, 2008. The website gathers its core animation properties in a single online environment that is interactive and customizable for site visitors. The Kids' WB website offers both originally produced content along with classic animated episodes, games, and exploration of virtual worlds. Some of the characters to be used in the project from the Warner libraries include those of Looney Tunes, Hanna-Barbera, pre-1986 MGM animated characters and DC Comics.

In 2009, sister network Cartoon Network announced Scooby-Doo! Mystery Incorporated in the Fall 2009–2010 season by Warner Bros. Animation. Warner Bros. Animation recently announced several new projects, such as The Looney Tunes Show (formerly called Laff Riot); a reboot of ThunderCats, and several series based on DC Comics properties such as MAD, Green Lantern, and Young Justice.

Warner Bros. Animation also produced DC Showcase, a series of short subjects featuring lesser-known comic book superheroes, released in tandem with direct-to-video films based on DC Comics properties.

On July 30, 2010, Coyote Falls, a 3D cartoon featuring Wile E. Coyote and the Road Runner was released, being the first time WB Animation produced theatrically released content since The Karate Guard (the last Tom and Jerry short) in 2005, and the first time the animation studio used full CGI and stereoscopic 3D. Two more theatrical Wile E./Road Runner cartoons followed during the year (Fur of Flying and Rabid Rider). On June 8, 2011, three more shorts were announced: I Tawt I Taw a Puddy Tat with Sylvester, Tweety, and Granny, which was released with Happy Feet Two; Daffy's Rhapsody with Daffy Duck and Elmer Fudd, which was released with Journey 2: The Mysterious Island; and Flash in the Pain starring Wile E. Coyote and the Road Runner. All of these 6 shorts, directed by Matthew O'Callaghan and produced by Reel FX Creative Studios were available on the official Warner Bros. Animation YouTube channel, and have since been privated.

On October 27, 2014, Warner Bros. Animation collaborated with sister studio Williams Street for the first time for its first production with Adult Swim, Mike Tyson Mysteries, which satirizes the style and conventions of cartoons from the 1970s (such as Scooby-Doo) and celebrity-driven series such as Mister T. Warner Bros. Animation also produced Elf: Buddy's Musical Christmas—a stop-motion animated adaptation of the New Line Cinema film Elf and its musical adaptation—as a Christmas special for NBC, starring Jim Parsons.

=== 2019–present: Reconstruction with animation ===
On June 11, 2018, a new series of shorts, Looney Tunes Cartoons, was announced by Warner Bros. Animation. Its first "season" would feature 1,000 minutes (or 16 hours and 40 minutes) of new one-to-six minute cartoons featuring the brand's marquee characters, voiced by their current voice actors in "simple, gag-driven and visually vibrant stories" that are rendered by multiple artists employing "a visual style that will resonate with fans." Sam Register, president of Warner Bros. Animation, and Peter Browngardt, creator of Secret Mountain Fort Awesome and Uncle Grandpa, would serve as executive producers. The series made its worldwide debut at the Annecy International Animation Film Festival on June 10, 2019, and premiered as part of HBO Max's launch library on May 27, 2020.

In August 2021, it was announced that Jason DeMarco had been named SVP Anime & Action Series/Longform for Warner Bros. Animation and Cartoon Network Studios.

On May 11, 2022, after Tom Ascheim exited his role as president and departed, the Warner Bros. Global Kids, Young Adults and Classics division was broken up as part of a restructuring by new owner Warner Bros. Discovery and its studios—including Warner Bros. Animation—were moved directly under Warner Bros. Television. On October 11, 2022, Warner Bros. Animation merged its development and production teams with Cartoon Network Studios as part of a further restructuring by Warner Bros. Discovery; the merger would not affect the studios' output or branding.

In July 2023, Warner Bros. Animation moved from the Warner Bros. Ranch to the new Warner Bros. Second Century building.

On August 25, 2026, it was announced that Sam Register would be leaving his position as president of Warner Bros. Animation as well as Cartoon Network Studios and Hanna-Barbera Studios Europe after Warner Bros. Television Studios and Register decided to not renew the contract.

In November 2026, it was announced that Warner Bros. Animation alongside sister studios CNS and HBSE would operate in the newly created Skydance Television Animation unit alongside sister studios Nickeloden Animation Studios and Adult Swim. The announcement would promote Michael Ouweleen as the newest CEO of the unit.

== See also ==
- Cartoon Network Studios
- Hanna-Barbera Studios Europe
- Warner Bros. Family Entertainment
- Warner Bros. Pictures Animation
- Williams Street
- Turner Entertainment Co.
- DC Entertainment
- List of Warner Bros. theatrical animated feature films
- List of unproduced Warner Bros. Animation projects
- List of animation studios owned by Warner Bros. Discovery

== Bibliography ==
- Jones, Chuck (1990). Chuck Amuck: The Life and Times of an Animated Cartoonist. New York: Farrar, Straus and Giroux. ISBN 978-0-374-12348-2.
- Maltin, Leonard (1987) [1980]. Of Mice and Magic. New York: Plume. p. 273. ISBN 978-0-45-225993-5.
