= I Taut I Taw a Puddy-Tat =

1950 popular song recorded by Mel Blanc

- Side A of the US single

Single by Mel Blanc and the Billy May Orchestra
- B-side: "I'm Glad That I'm Bugs Bunny"
- Released: December 1950
- Recorded: June 29, 1950
- Genre: Novelty
- Length: 2:58
- Label: Capitol
- Songwriters: Alan Livingston, Billy May, Warren Foster

Alternative cover
- Sleeve of the 1970 UK single

"I Taut I Taw A Puddy-Tat" is a novelty song composed and written by Alan Livingston, Billy May and Warren Foster. It was sung by Mel Blanc, who provided the voice of the bird, Tweety and of his nemesis Sylvester.

== Lyrics ==
The lyrics depict the basic formula of the Tweety-Sylvester cartoons released by Warner Bros. Cartoons throughout the late 1940s into the early 1960s - Tweety is just being a canary. Sylvester, the cat, is always (he thinks, craftily), plotting to catch Tweety Bird, while Tweety, being much smarter than Sylvester, is relentlessly teasing him and getting away, making Sylvester very frustrated indeed.

Toward the end of the song, the two perform a duet, with Tweety coaxing Sylvester into singing with him after promising that his (Tweety's) mistress won't chase him (Sylvester) away.

== Pop chart ==
"I Taut I Taw A Puddy-Tat" reached No. 9 on the Billboard pop chart during a seven-week chart run in February and March 1951, and sold more than two million records.

== Covers ==
The song was covered by Helen Kane between 1950–51 with Jimmy Carroll & His Orchestra.Around the same time the song was also covered by Danny Kaye.

In 2008, the British comedian Jeremy Hardy sang the song's lyrics to the tune of "I Vow to Thee, My Country", during a live recording of the BBC Radio 4 panel game, I'm Sorry I Haven't a Clue.

== Adaptation of the song to a film ==
In 2011, Warner Bros. created a 3D CGI Looney Tunes short of the same name starring Sylvester, Tweety, and Granny (June Foray in her final theatrical voice acting role before her death in 2017), incorporating Blanc's vocals with brand new animation and music. The short premiered in theaters with Happy Feet Two.
