= Baton Bunny =

1959 film

- Lobby card
- Directed by: Chuck Jones; Abe Levitow
- Story by: Michael Maltese
- Starring: Mel Blanc
- Edited by: Treg Brown
- Music by: Milt Franklyn
- Animation by: Ken Harris; Richard Thompson; Ben Washam
- Layouts by: Maurice Noble
- Backgrounds by: Tom O'Loughlin
- Color process: Technicolor
- Production company: Warner Bros. Cartoons
- Distributed by: Warner Bros. Pictures
- Release dates: January 10, 1959 (original); April 20, 1968 (rerelease)
- Running time: 7 minutes

Baton Bunny is a 1959 Warner Bros. Looney Tunes cartoon, directed by Chuck Jones and Abe Levitow. The short was released on 10 January 1959, and stars Bugs Bunny.

It shows Bugs conducting an unseen orchestra – with a fly bothering him. Bugs conducts, and in part, plays the overture to "Ein Morgen, ein Mittag und Abend in Wien" (A Morning, Noon, and Night in Vienna)", a composition by Franz von Suppé. Although Mel Blanc was credited for vocal characterizations, there is no dialogue in the short; the only vocal effect made was when an audience member is heard coughing. This is the third and last Bugs Bunny cartoon (the first two being A Corny Concerto and Rhapsody Rabbit) where Bugs is mostly silent; at one point, he 'shushes' the brass. This is also one of the last cartoons to get a Merrie Melodies Blue Ribbon reissue in 1968.

== Plot ==
Bugs is about to conduct "The Warner Bros. Symphony Orchestra" (supposedly in concert at the Hollywood Bowl). As he begins his elaborate preparation, someone in the audience starts coughing loudly. Bugs holds up a sign reading, "Throw the bum out!", which the audience does. Other problems plague Bugs' conducting, notably a bothersome fly and awkward cuffs that keep falling off; with each of these issues, his reactions act as direction to the orchestra, which responds accordingly, angering Bugs. In the middle of the performance, as a result of the music at that moment, Bugs plays dual roles as an indigenous person and the American troops chasing him. As his performance ends, the fly returns, landing on Bugs' nose. Bugs loses his sanity and attempts to kill the fly, crashing through the orchestra and into the instruments as he does so. As the music ends and the fly seems to be dead, Bugs bows to the crowd. Instead of applause, there is only silence and crickets chirping. Bugs looks around and sees that the seats are empty, then he becomes aware of faint clapping – coming from the fly. He bows to the fly, and the cartoon ends.

== Home media ==
The short was released on DVD on the Looney Tunes Golden Collection: Volume 1 in 2003.

== See also ==
- Looney Tunes and Merrie Melodies filmography (1950–59)
- List of Bugs Bunny cartoons
- Rhapsody Rabbit, a similar 1946 short where Bugs Bunny plays Hungarian Rhapsody No. 2 while fending off a mouse

Preceded by Pre-Hysterical Hare	Bugs Bunny Cartoons; 1959	Succeeded by Hare-Abian Nights
