= Looney Tunes: Rabbits Run =

- DVD cover
- Directed by: Jeff Siergey
- Screenplay by: Hugh Davidson; Rachel Ramras
- Story by: Hugh Davidson; Larry Dorf; Rachel Ramras
- Based on: Looney Tunes by Warner Bros.
- Produced by: Jeff Siergey; Hugh Davidson
- Starring: Fred Armisen; Jeff Bergman; Damon Jones; Maurice LaMarche; Rachel Ramras; Jim Rash; Billy West
- Edited by: Craig Paulsen
- Music by: Kevin Manthei
- Production company: Warner Bros. Animation
- Distributed by: Warner Home Video
- Release dates: July 7, 2015 (Walmart/Vudu); August 4, 2015 (General)
- Running time: 75 minutes
- Country: United States
- Language: English

Looney Tunes: Rabbits Run is a 2015 American animated direct-to-video adventure comedy film in the Looney Tunes franchise produced by Warner Bros. Animation. The movie is based on the 2011 Cartoon Network television series The Looney Tunes Show, and is also the first new Looney Tunes direct-to-video film since Bah, Humduck! A Looney Tunes Christmas was released nine years prior. The film is a standalone follow-up which was made shortly after the series ended, and shares much of the same crew as that series, including director Jeff Siergey, who had also been a supervising animator on Space Jam and lead animator on Looney Tunes: Back in Action. It was released on August 4, 2015, by Warner Home Video, but it was released early on July 7, 2015 on Vudu and Walmart.

== Plot ==
From his headquarters, NSA General Foghorn Leghorn, his intern Pete Puma, and spy Cecil Turtle oversee an operation on a mountain in the central Mexican jungle. The objective of the operation is to extract a rare flower, as the agents believe it to be the world's most powerful weapon. However, they are beaten to it by Speedy Gonzales. In New York City, Lola Bunny is bored of working for Giovanni Jones at the Acme department store perfume counter. She accidentally damages the store, gets fired and takes a long, awkward ride home in Bugs Bunny's taxi. Arriving in her apartment, she screams when she sees a mouse, even though it is her landlord, Speedy. He gives her the flower as a gift, unaware it is being watched by the NSA.

General Leghorn sends agent Elmer Fudd to watch the flower, though Lola uses it to create her perfume, which has a side effect of invisibility. She doesn't notice as she accidentally sprays her eye, forcing her to wash it out, rendering her visible. Cecil sends his goons to get it, but Lola backs out the window and falls to Bugs' taxi below. On the way down, the perfume makes the wall invisible exposing, in successive apartments. General Leghorn puts out a reward of $500,000 for Bugs and Lola, and Yosemite Sam, who was preparing to rob a bank in Times Square (with just a short-range water pistol), learns of it and detains them. However, he refuses to hand them to the NSA or the NYPD until after he gets the money, and a one-sided gunfight ensues. Lola and Bugs escape down a storm drain.

They emerge through a manhole in front of Porky Pig, causing a traffic jam, but Giovanni grabs the perfume. Lola runs after him and gets abducted by Cecil in a van. Bugs jumps in Daffy Duck's taxi and follows them. At a secret location, Cecil and his goons interrogate Lola and leave her to die, but Bugs and Daffy manage to free her. Driving through the streets (and subway tunnels) of New York and running through Central Park, the rabbits make haste to John F. Kennedy International Airport. Daffy envies the ducks in the park and decides to retire. Having been arrested, Sam steals an NSA car and follows Bugs and Lola to the airport, where she spots Giovanni, and they all board the plane as does Cecil. Bugs retrieves the perfume and makes a parachute from clothes in passengers' checked baggage and, after a fight with Sam over the perfume, he and Lola land in the Atlantic Ocean. The Goofy Gophers pick them up in their yacht, try the perfume, and discover its invisibility property, albeit to Lola's dismay, but Bugs convinces her to see the upside. The Gophers subsequently give Lola a makeover.

They arrive in Paris, and Bugs and Lola spray themselves, subsequently having fun with their invisibility: stealing lemonade, smashing the Louvre Pyramid by playing baseball, going skiing in "Ze Alps", painting a picture of the perfume and cramming several cars into the Arc de Triomphe. When it rains, the invisibility wears off and they find themselves caught between Elmer Fudd and Cecil at the Pont des Arts, Fudd holding the Gophers hostage. Cecil and his goons betray and disarm Fudd and the Interpol officers he hired with heat ray pistols, and Bugs tries to throw the bottle into the Seine to force the cops to stand down, but Sam catches it. They all dogpile on Sam, but are suddenly teleported to a space station over Mars, where Marvin the Martian grabs the bottle, with Cecil revealing he works for Marvin. Cecil's goons unzip their costumes revealing they are Instant Martians, much to Cecil's confusion. Marvin reveals his plan to make all of Earth invisible, as it "obstructs [his] view of Venus". To do so, he extracts the invisibility part of the potion from the perfume part, but ends up with two identical bottles; one of them has invisibility and the other does not.

Bugs and Lola play switcheroo and end up with both of them, handing Marvin a Joker card. They are chased to the Transporter Depot, but everyone crams into one pod overloading the system and causing them all to switch heads, bodies, and other parts. They continue to play body part swap for a while and even Screwball Daffy from Duck Amuck walks across the scene, and they are eventually restored. Marvin catches them, grabs the bottle, betrays/fires Cecil and sprays the Earth with perfume, not knowing that Bugs has switched it so Earth doesn't turn invisible. To Marvin's fury, Bugs turns the group and himself invisible, allowing them to escape the Martians, and they board the Martian Maggot. Before they leave, Bugs tosses Marvin the Illudium Q-36 Explosive Space Modulator, which Marvin was originally going to use to blow up Earth. Ironically, the Modulator blows up Mars instead, killing the Instant Martians and leaving Marvin hanging from a root, remarking "I hate Earthlings." The Maggot returns the rest safely to Earth, landing in the Seine. When they accidentally leave the bottle in the spaceship, sinking with it, Fudd comes to believe the world is not ready for invisibility, and starts a one-sided chase to arrest Cecil for his complicity in Marvin's plan. Lola forgives Giovanni for stealing the perfume, and happily continues her relationship with Bugs. Unexpectedly, Speedy shows up to collect his "morning croissant" and briefly calls Lola out on her failures to pay rent while being able to visit Paris, before departing for Switzerland.

One year later, perfume mogul Pepé Le Pew introduces his newest scent "Lola" and back in New York, Bugs reveals that he still has the invisibility potion, while Daffy has retired to Central Park. In a pre-credit scene, during the "That's All Folks!" ending, after Porky says "Th-th-th-that's all, folks!" Daffy walks across with a corndog and sarcastically remarks "Interesting," whereupon Porky angrily hits Daffy on the head with a frying pan.

== Voice cast ==
- Rachel Ramras as Lola Bunny, a tan bunny who is on the run due to inadvertently creating invisibility. Ramras replaces Kristen Wiig, who provided the voice in The Looney Tunes Show.
- Jeff Bergman as:
  - Bugs Bunny, a grey bunny taxi driver who is protecting Lola from the NSA and criminals.
  - Daffy Duck, a black duck taxi driver who helps Bugs and Lola escape.
  - Foghorn Leghorn, the rooster general of the NSA.
  - Pepé Le Pew, a French skunk perfume mogul who buys Lola's scent. Bergman reprises all four of his roles from The Looney Tunes Show.
- Damon Jones as Marvin the Martian, a Martian who plans to make Earth invisible so he can look at Venus. Jones replaces Eric Bauza as the speaking voice of Marvin after providing the singing voice of the character The Looney Tunes Show.
- Maurice LaMarche as Yosemite Sam, a petty criminal who is after Bugs and Lola, but only for the money. LaMarche reprises his role from The Looney Tunes Show.
- Billy West as Elmer Fudd, an associate of General Leghorn's sent to capture Bugs and Lola. West reprises his role from The Looney Tunes Show.
- Jim Rash as Cecil Turtle, a turtle who is after Bugs and Lola and revealed as a double agent working for Marvin. Rash reprises his role from The Looney Tunes Show.
- Michael Serrato as Giovanni Jones, Lola's former boss. Serrato reprises his role from The Looney Tunes Show.
- Fred Armisen as Speedy Gonzales, a mouse and Lola's landlord. Armisen reprises his role from The Looney Tunes Show.
- Rob Paulsen as Mac Gopher, a gopher who shares a boat with Tosh. Paulsen reprises his role from The Looney Tunes Show.
- Jess Harnell as:
  - Tosh Gopher, a gopher who shares a boat with Mac. Harnell reprises his role from The Looney Tunes Show.
  - Pete Puma, a puma who is an intern for General Leghorn until he's fired for coming up with "Operation Flower Grab". Harnell replaces John Kassir, who provided the voice in The Looney Tunes Show.
- Bob Bergen as Porky Pig, a pig who is delayed by Bugs and Lola. Bergen reprises his role from The Looney Tunes Show.
- Ariane Price as French Woman
  - Price also voices Perfume Girl

== Release ==
The film was released on DVD with the bonus cartoons "Best Friends" (the first episode of The Looney Tunes Show) and the 3D animated theatrical shorts Coyote Falls, Fur of Flying, Rabid Rider, and I Tawt I Taw a Puddy Tat.

The film later premiered on Cartoon Network on March 25, 2016.

== Reception ==
Writing for Common Sense Media, Renee Longstreet gave the film 3 stars: "Humor is an important part of this tale; even the bad guys are funny and exhibit their special quirkiness. Die-hard Looney Tunes fans, accustomed to the wit and wisdom, inventive animation, and satire found in the earlier Warner Bros. cartoons by Chuck Jones, Friz Freleng, and others may be disappointed, but this film still should entertain today's kids, especially those familiar with the latest TV program."
