= Best Fiends =

2014 video game

- Developer: Seriously
- Publisher: Seriously
- Composer: Heitor Pereira
- Platforms: iOS, Android
- Release: 2014
- Genre: Puzzle

Best Fiends is a mobile game centered around tile-matching gameplay. Since it launched in 2014.

== Plot ==
Minutia was a peaceful land where the Fiends lived in peace. One day, a meteor struck Mount Boom, where the slugs who lived there turned into aggressive beasts, invading Minutia and kidnapping the Fiends and families. A mite named Temper, who was the only one who survived the attack, must go on a journey to rescue the Fiends, and travel throughout Minutia to reach Mount Boom, and stop the Slug invasion.

== History ==
The original Best Fiends game was launched exclusively on iOS devices in 2014 by the gaming start-up "Seriously" which had been founded the previous year by several former Rovio executives. The company's goal was for Best Fiends to start as a game. As part of this strategy, "Seriously" launched a YouTube channel to produce short animated videos alongside the launch of the first Best Fiends game and recruited Heitor Pereira to compose orchestral music for the game. The Best Fiends animated videos were produced by Reel FX and featured voice acting from Mark Hamill. Within two weeks of its launch, Best Fiends had been downloaded 1.5 million times.

The second game, Best Fiends Forever, was launched in October 2016, the third game, Best Fiends Slugs, was soft-launched the following December, and the fourth game, Best Fiends Stars, was released in 2018.
