= I Tawt I Taw a Puddy Tat =

2011 musical Looney Tunes short

- Poster
- Directed by: Matthew O'Callaghan
- Story by: Matthew O'Callaghan
- Produced by: Spike Brandt; Tony Cervone
- Starring: Mel Blanc; June Foray
- Music by: Christopher Lennertz (adaptation score); Billy May, Warren Foster and Alan Livingston (song)
- Color process: Deluxe
- Production companies: Reel FX Creative Studios; Warner Bros. Animation
- Distributed by: Warner Bros. Pictures
- Release date: November 18, 2011 (with Happy Feet Two)
- Running time: 4 minutes
- Country: United States
- Language: English

I Tawt I Taw a Puddy Tat is a 2011 American animated Looney Tunes short film featuring the characters Tweety, Sylvester, and Granny. It is an adaptation of the 1950 song "I Taut I Taw a Puddy-Tat" sung by Mel Blanc. It features the voice of June Foray as Granny and Blanc's archive recordings taken from the song for Sylvester and Tweety. I Tawt I Taw a Puddy Tat was first shown in theaters before the Warner Bros. feature-length film Happy Feet Two.

== Plot ==
Inside Granny's apartment, while Granny is asleep, Tweety sings about his life at home and about Sylvester, who always wants to eat him.

== Voice cast ==
- Mel Blanc (via archival recordings) as Tweety and Sylvester
- June Foray as Granny

== Production ==
Following the production of Coyote Falls, Fur of Flying and Rabid Rider, Warner Bros. president Sam Register entered writer and director Matthew O'Callaghan's office, where he shared a CD of novelty songs and stories recorded by Mel Blanc. Register had plans of creating animated shorts based on the songs, combining the Looney Tunes characters with CGI animation. After listening to the songs and watching the classic Looney Tunes and Merrie Melodies cartoons, O'Callaghan decided to make a short based on "I Taut I Taw a Puddy-Tat". The original record was, according to O'Callaghan, "a sweet duet" without the original cartoons' slapstick violence. Gags had to be added in the song without interrupting the lyrics, and O'Callaghan also choreographed the action, making sure to avoid interrupting or changing the music.

The short was produced by Reel FX Creative Studios and Circus Ink Entertainment Ltd., animated by Monica Aston, Ernesto Bottger, Rod Douglas, Eric Drobile, Avner Engel, Troy Griffin, Randy Hayes, Cherise Higashi, T. Daniel Hofstedt, Joseph P. Johnston, Sidney Kombo-Kintombo, Matt Kummer, Stephen Lewis, Stephen Orsini, Keith Osborn, Jill Petrilak, Shahbaaz Shah, Alexander Snow, Lisa Souza, Chad Stewart, Helio Takahashi, Dennis Venizelos, Dimos Vrysellas, Todd Willbur, Wallace Williamson, Paul Wood, and Todd Harper. O'Callaghan and his team had the action take place in a New York City apartment to explore the potential of the characters' physical interactions in 3D.

Blanc's vocal track was separated from the original recording and remastered for the short, with the score being adapted by Christopher Lennertz. Archive recordings of Blanc from the classic cartoons were also used. June Foray was brought in to reprise her role as Granny. Joe Alaskey provided additional vocal effects for Sylvester, which went unused.

== Release ==
The short was released theatrically with Happy Feet Two. It was attached as a special feature on the Happy Feet Two DVD and Blu-ray.

It was also included as a bonus on the DVD release of Looney Tunes: Rabbits Run.
