= Reel FX Animation =

American computer animation and visual effects studio

Reel FX, Inc.
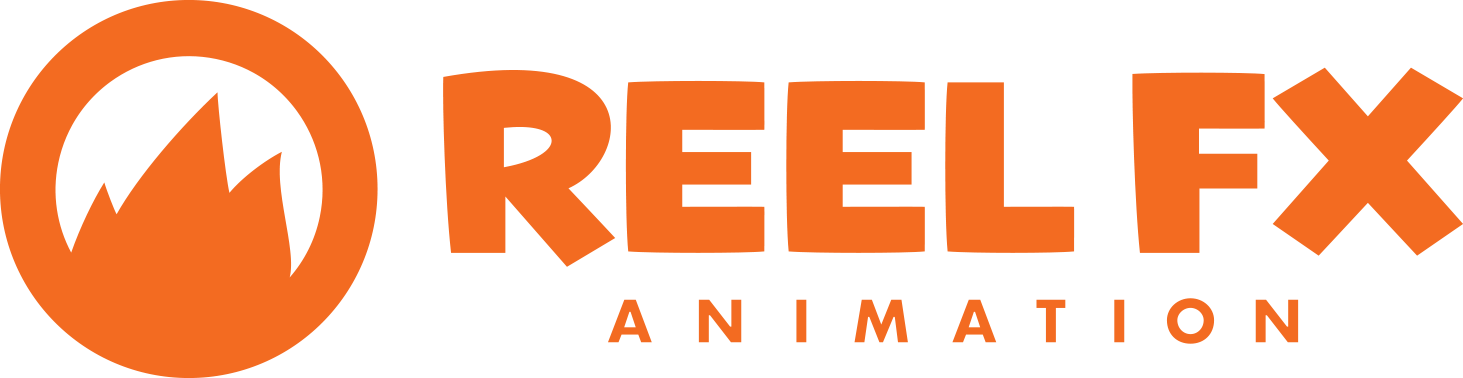
- Logo used since 2023
- Trade name: Reel FX Animation
- Formerly: Reel Magic (1993–1995); Reel FX Creative Studios (1995–2020); Reel FX Animation Studios (2020–2023)
- Type: Private
- Industry: Animated feature films Television series
- Founded: 1993; 33 years ago
- Headquarters: 717 North Harwood Street; Floor 27, Dallas, Texas, U.S.
- Number of locations: 1575 N. Gower St; Suite 380 Hollywood, California, United States; 1751 Richardson St; Suite 5400 Montreal, Quebec
- Key people: Steve O'Brien (CEO, chairman); Donna Henry (president); Chuck Peil (EVP/partnerships); Joanna Ferguson (SVP, feature production); Emmanuel Laurent (SVP, Real-Time Production); Lucas Koppel (Development Producer)
- Number of employees: 350 (2013)
- Divisions: Reel FX Animation; Reel FX Originals; ATKPLN; Flight School Studio
- Website: www.reelfx.com

Reel FX, Inc. (doing business as Reel FX Animation), formerly known as Reel FX Creative Studios and Reel FX Entertainment, is an American computer animation and visual effects studio based in Dallas, Texas, with offices in Hollywood, California, and Montreal, Quebec. Known for its multiple projects on animated films/series and visual effects for live-action films.

The studio primarily produces animated features, short films, and television series. Among them is the studio's first original animated feature film, Free Birds, released in 2013. A year later, The Book of Life was released. The film received several nominations, including Best Animated Feature Nominations from the Golden Globes, Critics’ Choice Awards, Producers Guild Awards and Annie Awards. In 2020, Reel FX Animation teamed up with Warner Animation Group (now Warner Bros. Pictures Animation) on Scoob!. In addition, the studio released Rumble, a co-production with Paramount Animation and Back to the Outback with Netflix Animation, both in 2021. Most recently, Reel FX teamed up with Paramount Animation and Nickelodeon Movies to create The SpongeBob Movie: Search for SquarePants in 2025.

The studio's upcoming slate of films include an animated Bollywood-focused musical film titled Diya with Paramount Animation, GoldDay and Karma Productions.

== History ==
Reel FX Animation was founded in 1993 as Reel Magic in Fort Worth, Texas. The studio was the sixth to purchase an Autodesk Flame system. In 1995, the company moved to Dallas and changed its name to Reel FX Creative Studios. Reel FX purchased West End Post, and in 1999, moved to the White Swan building in the West End. In 2005, the studio moved its headquarters east a couple of miles to Deep Ellum. The company opened a second location in Pasadena, California, and in 2008 merged with VFX-studio Radium and opened a studio in Santa Monica.

In 2017, Reel FX opened its first studio outside the United States in Montreal, Canada. The studio would eventually add artists in Toronto and Vancouver as well.

=== Films and releases ===
In 1999, the studio produced its first short film, The Man In The Moon. Based on William Joyce's Guardians of Childhood and co-directed by Joyce and Brandon Oldenburg. The short film became the first Reel FX Original (now called Inventions), and in 2007, was optioned to DreamWorks Animation where it ultimately became Rise of the Guardians, directed by Peter Ramsey. In October 2012, The Hollywood Reporter revealed Reel FX's connection to the 2012 feature film.

In December 2010, Reel FX produced an untitled 3D film with producer Andrew Adamson and Cirque du Soleil. In January 2012, Paramount Pictures announced that it had acquired worldwide rights to the film, now titled Worlds Away directed by Adamson and executive-produced by James Cameron.

First called Turkeys, and opened in 2013 under Free Birds, the film was directed by Jimmy Hayward and starred Owen Wilson, Woody Harrelson, and Amy Poehler. Its release landed Reel FX's CEO Steve O’Brien the front page of D CEO Magazine in their May–June edition of that year.

Following the release of The Book of Life, Reel FX assisted on Rock Dog (Summit Entertainment, Huayi Brothers) and UglyDolls (STX Entertainment) while developing its next feature. Released in 2021, Rumble is based on Rob Harrell's graphic novel Monster on the Hill and adapted for the screen by Matt Lieberman and Etan Cohen. In 2022, Reel FX released their original animated series Super Giant Robot Brothers!, with Netflix Animation. Directed by Mark Andrews (Brave), the episodic series was created using a custom-built real-time production pipeline with Epic Games’ Unreal Engine, the first animated series to be rendered entirely in a video game engine.

== Filmography ==
=== Feature films ===
==== Original films ====
Lists
Title	Release date	Co-production with	Distributor	Director(s)
Free Birds	November 1, 2013	Relativity Media	Relativity Media	Jimmy Hayward
The Book of Life	October 17, 2014	20th Century Fox Animation; Mexopolis; Chatrone	20th Century Fox	Jorge R. Gutierrez
Rumble	December 15, 2021	Paramount Animation; WWE Studios; Walden Media; New Republic Pictures	Paramount+	Hamish Grieve
Diya	TBA	Paramount Animation; GoldDay; Good Karma Productions	Paramount Pictures	Nitya Mehra
Doctor Dolittle: King of the Wild	TBA	Sycamore Studios	TBA	Timothy Reckart

==== Animation and visual effects services ====
Title	Release date	Production companies	Distributor	Director(s)	Note(s)
Spy Kids 2: The Island of Lost Dreams	August 7, 2002	Troublemaker Studios	Dimension Films	Robert Rodriguez	
The Wild	April 14, 2006	Walt Disney Pictures; Hoytyboy Pictures; Sir Zip Productions; Contrafilm; C.O.R.E.	Buena Vista Pictures Distribution	Steve Williams	Opening sequence only
Everyone's Hero	September 15, 2006	IDT Entertainment	20th Century Fox	Christopher Reeve; Colin Brady; Daniel St. Pierre	
Open Season 2	January 27, 2009	Sony Pictures Animation	Sony Pictures Home Entertainment	Matthew O'Callaghan; Todd Wilderman	with co-services by Sony Pictures Imageworks
The Spy Next Door	January 15, 2010	Relativity Media	Lionsgate	Brian Levant	
Open Season 3	January 25, 2011	Sony Pictures Animation	Sony Pictures Home Entertainment	Cody Cameron	with co-services by Sony Pictures Imageworks
Judy Moody and the Not Bummer Summer	June 10, 2011	Smokewood Entertainment	Relativity Media (United States); Universal Pictures (International)	John Schultz	
Cirque du Soleil: Worlds Away	December 21, 2012	Cirque du Soleil; Strange Weather Films; Cameron Pace Group	Paramount Pictures	Andrew Adamson	
Rock Dog	February 24, 2017	Huayi Brothers	Summit Entertainment	Ash Brannon	
UglyDolls	May 3, 2019	STX Family; Alibaba Pictures; Troublemaker Studios; Original Force	STX Entertainment	Kelly Asbury	
Scoob!	May 15, 2020	Warner Bros. Pictures; Warner Animation Group	Warner Bros. Pictures	Tony Cervone	
Back to the Outback	December 10, 2021	Netflix Animation; Weed Road Pictures	Netflix	Clare Knight; Harry Cripps	
The Monkey King	August 18, 2023	Netflix Animation; Pearl Studio; Star Overseas	Netflix	Anthony Stacchi	
The SpongeBob Movie: Search for SquarePants	December 19, 2025	Paramount Animation; Nickelodeon Movies; United Plankton Pictures; MRC	Paramount Pictures	Derek Drymon	

=== Television ===
==== Series ====
===== Original series =====
Title	Years	Co-production with	Network	Creator
Super Giant Robot Brothers	2022	Netflix Animation; Assemblage Entertainment	Netflix	Víctor Maldonado; Alfredo Torres

===== Animation services =====
Title	Years	Co-production with	Network	Creator
No Activity (season 4)	2021	Funny or Die; Gary Sanchez Productions; Jungle Entertainment; Flight School Studio; CBS Studios	Paramount+	Trent O'Donnell

==== Specials ====
- Jonah Sing-Along Songs and More! (2002; with Big Idea Productions)
- Halloweentown High (2004)
- Snow 2: Brain Freeze (2008)
- Ice Age: A Mammoth Christmas (2011; with 20th Century Fox Animation and Blue Sky Studios)

=== Short films ===
- The Man in the Moon (1999)
- Aunt Fanny's Tour of Booty (2005; co-animated with Blue Sky Studios)
- Secrets of the Furious Five (2008; with DreamWorks Animation and Film Roman)
- Live Music (2009) (co-produced with Mass Animation)
- Looney Tunes: (with Warner Bros. Pictures and Warner Bros. Animation)
  - Wile E. Coyote and Road Runner shorts:
    - Rabid Rider (2010)
    - Fur of Flying (2010)
    - Coyote Falls (2010)
    - Flash in the Pain (2014)
  - I Tawt I Taw a Puddy Tat (2011)
  - Daffy's Rhapsody (2012)
- Pacific Rim: Jaeger Pilot (2014)
- The Adventures of Chuy (2015) (co-production with 20th Century Fox Animation)
- Son of Jaguar (2016)
- Best Fiends:
  - Best Fiends: Boot Camp (2017)
  - Best Fiends: Visit Minutia (2017)
  - Best Fiends: Fort of Hard Knocks (2018)
  - Best Fiends: Baby Slug's Big Day Out (2018)
  - Best Fiends: Howie's Gift (2019)
  - Best Fiends: Temper's Adventure (2019)
  - Best Fiends: The Immortal Cockroach (2019)
  - Best Fiends: The Fight Before Christmas (2019)
  - Best Fiends: King Slug Industries (2020)
- La Calesita (2022)

=== Theme park attractions ===
- The Simpsons Ride (2008; co-animated with Blur Studio)
- Despicable Me: Minion Mayhem (2012)

=== Direct-to-video ===
- Barney Home Video (1996–2000) (visual effects)
- G.I. Joe: Spy Troops (2003)
- G.I. Joe: Valor vs. Venom (2004)
- Action Man: X Missions – The Movie (2005)
- BOZ the Bear: Colors and Shapes (2006)
- BOZ the Bear: Friends and Helpers (2006)
- BOZ the Bear: Bananas, Bubbles and Busy Bodies (2006)
- BOZ the Bear: Adventures in Imagination (2006)
- The Three Wise Men (formerly The Very First Noel) (2006)
- BOZ the Bear: Thank You God for B-O-Zs and 1-2-3s! (2007)
- BOZ the Bear: Start Singing with Boz (2008)
- BOZ the Bear: A WowieBozowee Christmas (2008)
- Tales of the Black Freighter (2009)

=== Commercials ===
- Madagascar: Escape 2 Africa - Comcast
- Shrek Forever After - McDonald's
- Chuck E. Cheese's commercials from 2012 to 2015 (co-produced with Little Zoo Studio)
- Free Birds - Dwight Howard
- Cheetos Mix-ups - The Book Of Life
- Book of Life Happy Meal - McDonald's
- The Lego Batman Movie - Chevrolet
- UglyDolls - Happy Meal

=== Production logos ===
- New Line Cinema (1994; prototype and revised versions)
- Orion Pictures (1996)
- Relativity Media (2009, 2013)
- Warner Animation Group (2016, 2020; co-produced with Devastudios)
- Paramount Animation (2019; co-produced with ATK PLN)
