= Rhapsody Rabbit =

1946 animated short film by Friz Freleng

- Title card
- Directed by: I. Freleng
- Story by: Tedd Pierce; Michael Maltese
- Starring: Mel Blanc
- Music by: Carl W. Stalling; Jakob Gimpel (piano solo, uncredited)
- Animation by: Manuel Perez; Ken Champin; Virgil Ross; Gerry Chiniquy
- Layouts by: Hawley Pratt
- Backgrounds by: Terry Lind
- Color process: Technicolor
- Production company: Warner Bros. Cartoons
- Distributed by: Warner Bros. Pictures; The Vitaphone Corporation
- Release date: November 9, 1946
- Running time: 7:33
- Language: English

Rhapsody Rabbit is a 1946 American animated comedy short film in the Merrie Melodies series, directed by Friz Freleng and featuring Bugs Bunny. The movie was originally released to theaters by Warner Bros. Pictures on November 9, 1946. This short is a follow-up of sorts to Freleng's 1941 Academy Award-nominated Rhapsody in Rivets, which also featured "Hungarian Rhapsody No. 2" by Franz Liszt. The "instrument" used to perform the "Hungarian Rhapsody" in Rhapsody in Rivets is a skyscraper under construction, while this short features Bugs playing the piece at a piano while being pestered by a mouse.

In 1946, film critic James Agee wrote in The Nation that the short is "the funniest thing I have seen since the decline of sociological dancing," saying, "The best of it goes two ways: one, very observant parody of concert-pianistic affectations, elegantly thought out and synchronized; the other, brutality keyed into the spirit of the music to reach greater subtlety than I have ever seen brutality reach before."

Rhapsody Rabbit was the first cartoon to be broadcast on Cartoon Network when the channel launched on October 1, 1992.

== Plot ==
Set against a backdrop of Richard Wagner's Siegfried funeral march, Bugs Bunny takes center stage as a piano virtuoso. Amidst thunderous applause, Bugs embarks on a performance of Franz Liszt's "Hungarian Rhapsody No. 2".

The opening scene sees Bugs poised at the piano, only to be interrupted by a persistent cough from an unseen audience member. Unfazed, Bugs resorts to unconventional means to silence the disturbance, humorously wielding a revolver from his tailcoat.

Throughout the performance, Bugs engages in playful banter, responding to a ringing phone inside the piano with his trademark catchphrase, "Eh, what's up, doc?" He cleverly incorporates musical references, such as singing "Fi-ga-ro!" during a familiar three-note sequence, adding a comedic twist to his piano playing.

As Bugs navigates through the piece, he encounters a pesky mouse that becomes a persistent nuisance. The encounter escalates into a musical duel, culminating in a boogie-woogie showdown. Despite momentarily trapping the mouse, Bugs is ultimately outwitted as the mouse reemerges, performing a surprise finale on a miniature piano.

In a comedic climax, Bugs confronts the final frenzied pages of the Rhapsody, culminating in exasperation as the mouse steals the spotlight with its unexpected performance. Frustrated yet undeterred, Bugs delivers the closing notes with characteristic wit, concluding the performance with a humorous flourish.

A controversial scene of Bugs Bunny shooting a man within the audience for coughing was later replaced with a sign.

== Voice cast ==
- Mel Blanc as Bugs Bunny, Rat and Coughing Audience Member

== Home media ==
The short is available on the Looney Tunes Golden Collection: Volume 2 DVD set, with an optional commentary track by musical historian Daniel Goldmark. It is also available on volume 2 of Looney Tunes: Spotlight Collection, as well as Warner Bros. Discovery's two video streaming services, the Boomerang SVOD app and Max (until 2025). It recently appeared on the Looney Tunes Collector's Vault: Volume 1 Blu-ray set.

== Plagiarism dispute ==
Months after the release of Rhapsody Rabbit, Metro-Goldwyn-Mayer cartoon studio (MGM) produced a comparable animated short titled The Cat Concerto, featuring Tom and Jerry. This production portrays Tom encountering distractions caused by Jerry, the mouse, during a piano concert performance. Noteworthy similarities between the two works include the replication of several comedic sequences and the utilization of Franz Liszt's "Hungarian Rhapsody No. 2" as their primary musical composition. The Cat Concerto received recognition by winning an Academy Award for Best Animated Short Film.

Following the presentation of both films at the 19th Academy Awards Ceremony, allegations of plagiarism arose from both MGM and Warner Bros. studios. Technicolor was accused of sending a print of either cartoon to a competing studio, who then plagiarized their rival's work. Despite attempts to address the matter, uncertainties persist regarding the origins of the similarities. While Rhapsody Rabbit holds an earlier Motion Picture Association approval number and release date, MGM's production timelines extended over a longer duration. Additionally, the substantial resemblances between the two animations may also be attributed to mere coincidence.

The controversy surrounding these productions received further examination in an episode of the Cartoon Network anthology series ToonHeads, providing a platform for discussion and analysis of the issue.

== See also ==
- Looney Tunes and Merrie Melodies filmography (1940–1949)
- Bugs Bunny filmography
- Convict Concerto (1954), a Woody Woodpecker cartoon
- Daffy's Rhapsody (2012), a Daffy Duck and Elmer Fudd cartoon
- Pink, Plunk, Plink (1966), a Pink Panther cartoon
- Who Framed Roger Rabbit (1988), a scene features a Donald Duck and Daffy Duck duelling on pianos, the climax features Liszt's Hungarian Rhapsody.
- Mickey Mousing, a film technique that syncs the accompanying music with the actions on screen

| Preceded by The Big Snooze | Bugs Bunny Cartoons; 1946 | Succeeded by Rabbit Transit |
