= Rabid Rider =

- Poster
- Directed by: Matthew O'Callaghan
- Written by: Tom Sheppard
- Produced by: Allison Abbate; Spike Brandt; Tony Cervone
- Music by: Christopher Lennertz
- Color process: Deluxe
- Production companies: Reel FX Creative Studios; Warner Bros. Animation
- Distributed by: Warner Bros. Pictures
- Release date: December 17, 2010 (with Yogi Bear)
- Running time: 3 minutes
- Country: United States

Rabid Rider is a 2010 animated Looney Tunes short film featuring the characters Wile E. Coyote and the Road Runner. Directed by Matthew O'Callaghan and written by Tom Sheppard, the film was first shown in theaters before Warner Bros. Pictures' feature-length film Yogi Bear. In 2014, Warner Bros. Animation published this short on YouTube. The short was also shown before the 2018 theatrical re-release of Batman: Mask of the Phantasm.

A 4D version – enhanced with physical effects like vibration, flashing lights and blasts of air – runs in a specially equipped theatre at the Cincinnati Zoo.

== Plot ==
Wile E. Coyote intends to use an ACME Hyper Sonic Transport to catch the Road Runner, but the transport has inherent problems of its own.

== Release ==
Rabid Rider was released theatrically by Warner Bros. Pictures with Yogi Bear.

=== Home media ===
The short was also released on the Yogi Bear Blu-ray.

The short was included on the Looney Tunes Super Stars' Road Runner and Wile E. Coyote: Supergenius Hijinks DVD. It was also included as a bonus on the DVD release of Looney Tunes: Rabbits Run.
