= Fur of Flying =

- Poster
- Directed by: Matthew O'Callaghan
- Written by: Tom Sheppard
- Produced by: Spike Brandt; Tony Cervone
- Edited by: Russell Eaton
- Storyboard by: Hank Tucker; Tom Sito; James Fujii; James A. Mitchell, Jr.
- Music by: Christopher Lennertz
- Color process: Deluxe
- Production companies: Reel FX Creative Studios; Warner Bros. Animation
- Distributed by: Warner Bros. Pictures
- Release date: September 24, 2010 (with Legend of the Guardians: The Owls of Ga'Hoole)
- Running time: 3 minutes
- Country: United States

Fur of Flying is a 2010 American animated Looney Tunes short film featuring the characters Wile E. Coyote and the Road Runner. Directed by Matthew O'Callaghan and written by Tom Sheppard, the film was first shown in theaters before Warner Bros. Pictures' feature-length film Legend of the Guardians: The Owls of Ga'Hoole. In 2014, Warner Bros. Animation published this short on YouTube.

== Plot ==
Using a makeshift helicopter-helmet, Wile E. Coyote intends to catch Road Runner while avoiding heat-seeking missiles. The start shows boxes bearing labels of various Acme products. Coyote uses the boxed items to create a wooden helicopter-helmet that he employs to chase the Road Runner. He encounters various environmental obstacles during the chase, including a cactus and rocky protrusions in a narrow canyon. Coyote and the Road Runner enter a restricted area, and 2 missiles are launched to chase them. The red one chases the Road Runner as the blue one chases after Coyote. Coyote ends up on a very high rock with the missile suspending on a branch just above him. Coyote's helmet accidentally activates, carrying him up to the missile, triggering its detonation. The rock breaks, sending Coyote into the path of the missile chasing the Road Runner. The helicopter-helmet comes loose, dooming Coyote to be hit by the remaining missile. He holds up a burnt yellow "That's All Folks!" sign before passing out.

== Release ==
Fur of Flying was released theatrically with Legend of the Guardians: The Owls of Ga'Hoole. The short was also released on the Legend of the Guardians DVD and Blu-ray.

The short was included on the Looney Tunes Super Stars' Road Runner and Wile E. Coyote: Supergenius Hijinks DVD. It was also included as a bonus on the DVD release of Looney Tunes: Rabbits Run.
