= Coyote Falls =

- Release poster
- Directed by: Matthew O'Callaghan
- Written by: Tom Sheppard
- Produced by: Spike Brandt; Tony Cervone
- Edited by: Russell Eaton
- Storyboard by: Hank Tucker; Tom Sito; James Fujii; James A. Mitchell, Jr.
- Music by: Christopher Lennertz
- Color process: Deluxe
- Production companies: Warner Bros. Animation; Reel FX Creative Studios
- Distributed by: Warner Bros. Pictures
- Release date: July 30, 2010 (with Cats & Dogs: The Revenge of Kitty Galore)
- Running time: 3 minutes
- Country: United States

Coyote Falls is a 2010 American animated Looney Tunes short film featuring the characters Wile E. Coyote and the Road Runner. Directed by Matthew O'Callaghan and written by Tom Sheppard, it is the first Wile E. Coyote and Road Runner short to be made into CGI as well as the first theatrically released 3D animated short since 1953's Lumber Jack-Rabbit. Coyote Falls was first shown in theaters before Warner Bros. Pictures' feature-length film Cats & Dogs: The Revenge of Kitty Galore. In 2014, Warner Bros. Animation published the short on YouTube.

== Plot ==
From a high bridge, Wile E. Coyote is pouring out his usual Bird Seed lure for the Road Runner below, and intends to use an Acme Bungee Cord he ordered to catch him. On his first two tries, he misses grabbing Road Runner, and on his way down a third time (with cutlery in hand), he collides with a gasoline truck and holds on to the tanker for dear life, but only succeeds in taking the gasoline tanker with him, which explodes upon impact.

On his next attempt, the Coyote continuously gets hit by oncoming trucks and eventually gets wrapped up in the bungee cord on the bridge. He is then freed by a passing tow truck, but crashes through the wall above the tunnel and is then hit by another truck. Road Runner then comes up to taunt him, and the Coyote sees yet another truck coming from behind. Wile E. uses the truck to chase after Road Runner, forgetting about the stretching bungee cord, and when he lets go to try to grab him, the Coyote is shot back by the bungee cord recoiling and hits yet another truck in the tunnel. The camera changes shots to the back of the truck with "That's all Folks!" written on it, and Wile E. recoils one more time, hitting the screen and sliding off, as the Road Runner speeds off through the tunnel.

== Awards ==
The film was nominated in the 38th Annie Awards and was shortlisted for an Academy Award.

== Release ==
Coyote Falls was released theatrically with Cats & Dogs: The Revenge of Kitty Galore, and is included on the DVD and Blu-ray releases of the film.

The short was included on the Looney Tunes Super Stars' Road Runner and Wile E. Coyote: Supergenius Hijinks DVD. It was also included as a bonus on the DVD release of Looney Tunes: Rabbits Run.
