= Acme Corporation =

Fictional company featured in Warner Bros. cartoons

- Looney Tunes and Merrie Melodies organization
- Acme Corporation logo, as seen in Coyote vs. Acme (2026)
- First appearance: Buddy's Bug Hunt (1935)

In-universe information
- Type: Conglomerate, mail-order company
- Products: Anvils, rocket skates, explosives, giant rubber bands, portable holes, and other outlandish products
- Slogan: "Quality is our #1 dream"

The Acme Corporation (simply referred to as Acme and stylized in all caps as ACME) is a fictional corporation that features prominently in the Road Runner/Wile E. Coyote animated shorts as a running gag. The company manufactures outlandish products that fail or backfire catastrophically at the worst possible times. The name is also used as a generic title in many cartoons, especially those made by Warner Bros., as well as films, TV series, commercials and comic strips.

== Origin ==
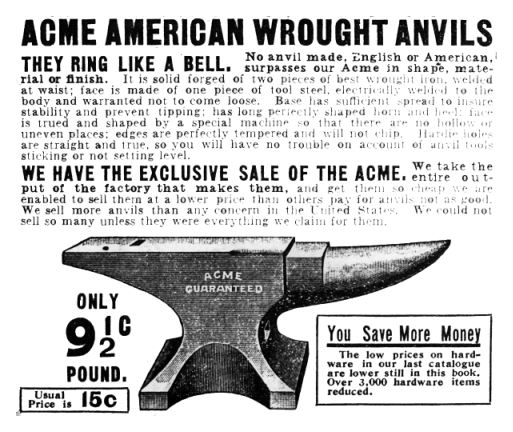
A real advertisement for ACME anvils.

The word Acme comes from the Ancient Greek ἀκμή (akmē) meaning 'summit', 'highest point', 'extremity', or 'peak'. It has been claimed to be an acronym, either for "A Company Making Everything", "American Companies Make Everything", or "American Company that Manufactures Everything". During the 1920s, the word was commonly used in the names of businesses to be listed toward the beginning of alphabetized telephone directories like the yellow pages, and implied being the best.

There was an Acme Tool and Manufacturing Company that produced cameras and animation stands, the most common standard for the holes punched into the edges of cels is called "Acme punched" and is based on their equipment. The Road Runner cartoons were produced before Warner Brothers started using this type of cel but the cameras may have been an influence.

The name Acme began being depicted in film starting in the silent era, such as the 1920 Neighbors with Buster Keaton and the 1922 Grandma's Boy with Harold Lloyd, continuing with television series, such as in early episodes of I Love Lucy and The Andy Griffith Show, comic strips and cartoons, especially those made by Warner Bros., and commercials. It briefly appeared in the Walt Disney Donald Duck episodes Cured Duck released in 1945 and Three for Breakfast released in 1948. It also appears as the ACME Mining company owned by the villain Rod Lacy in the 1952 Western The Duel at Silver Creek and in a 1938 short Violent Is the Word for Curly in which The Three Stooges appear as gas station attendants at an Acme Service Station. It was also used in The Pink Panther Show, in which the name Acme was used in several segments of the show's first episode in 1969, one of them being "Pink Pest Control".

Warner Brothers animator Chuck Jones described the reason "Acme" was used in cartoons at the time:

Since we had to search out our own entertainment, we devised our own fairy stories. If you wanted a bow and arrow you got a stick. If you wanted to conduct an orchestra you got a stick. If you wanted a duel you used a stick. You couldn't go and buy one; that's where the term Acme came from. Whenever we played a game where we had a grocery store or something we called it the ACME corporation. Why? Because in the yellow pages if you looked, say, under drugstores, you'd find the first one would be Acme Drugs. Why? Because "AC" was about as high as you could go; it means the best; the superlative.

== Depictions ==
=== In film and television ===
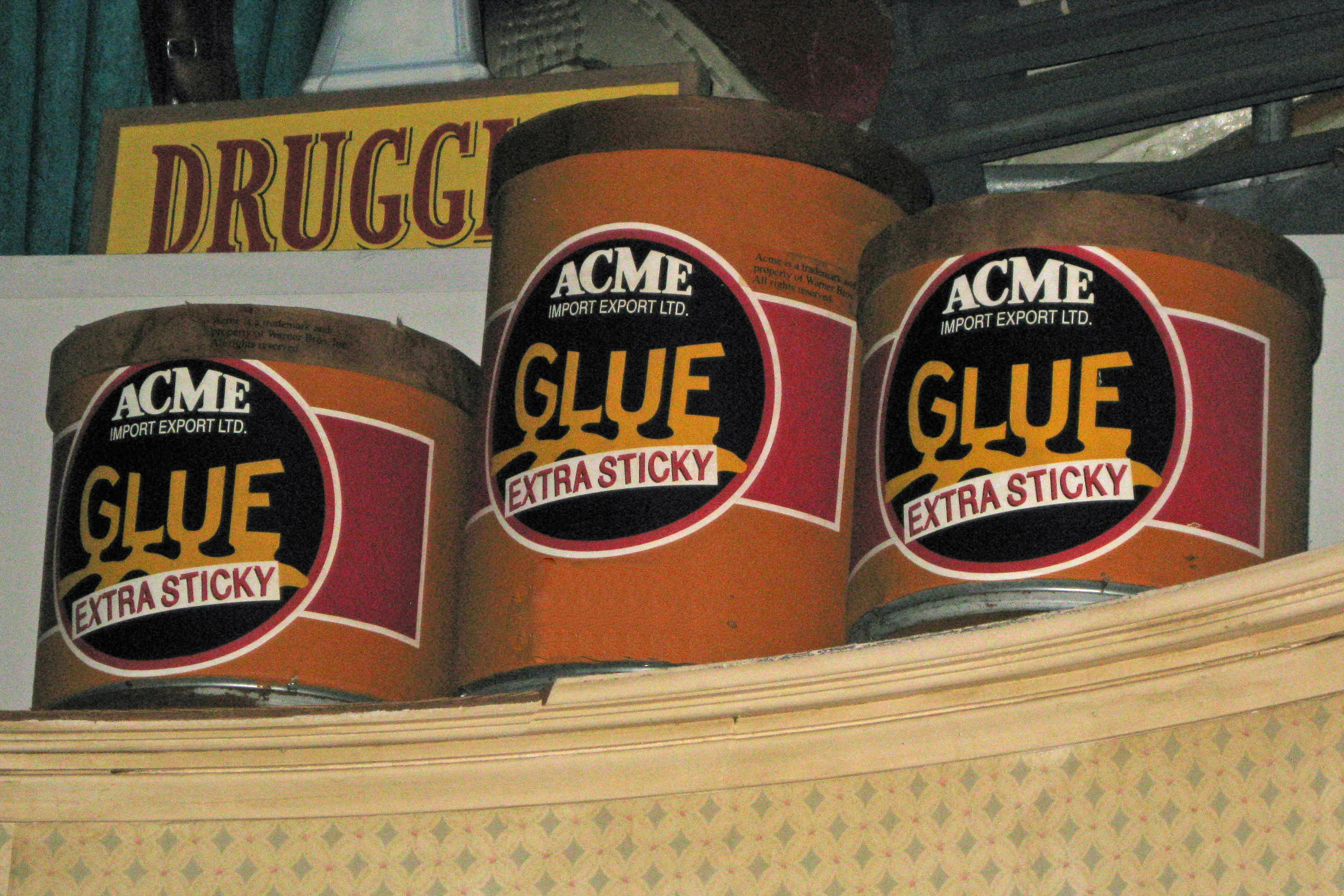
Jars of glue made by Acme, as props from Who Framed Roger Rabbit, at Disney Hollywood Studios

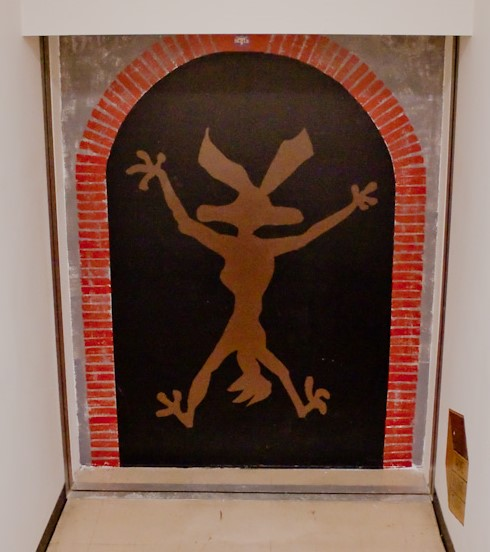
A mural of Wile E. Coyote smashed into an ACME Instant Tunnel on the wall of the Rotch Library at MIT

Examples that specifically reference the Wile E. Coyote cartoon character include:

- Various forms of film and television based on the Looney Tunes franchise often deal with the Acme Corporation.
  - The 1988 film Who Framed Roger Rabbit attempted to explain Acme's inner workings in detail. The plot is centered on the murder of the corporation's owner, Marvin Acme (Stubby Kaye). Many of the film's scenes involve Acme products and its climax is set in an Acme warehouse.
  - The Tiny Toon Adventures series expanded on Acme's influence, with the entire setting of the series taking place in a city called "Acme Acres" and its young protagonists attending "Acme Looniversity". In one episode, Calamity Coyote sues Acme, accusing it of making products that are unsafe.
  - The corporation appears as the antagonistic force of Looney Tunes: Back in Action. The head offices of Acme are depicted, revealing it to be a multinational corporation whose executive officers are led by the film's main antagonist, Mr. Chairman, portrayed by Steve Martin.
  - The 2015 direct-to-video animated film Looney Tunes: Rabbits Run portrays Acme as a department store.
  - Coyote vs. Acme revolves around Wile E. Coyote suing Acme for their faulty products; the film was released on August 28, 2026. Acme's legal defense is led by Buddy Crane, played by John Cena, while the role of Acme CEO is filled by Foghorn Leghorn.
  - The animated series Loonatics Unleashed is set in a city called Acmetropolis.
- The corporation is mentioned/referenced in Animaniacs numerous times, one of the most prominent examples being the episode "Cookies for Einstein", which features product ads for the "Acme Pocket Fisherman" and "Acme Hair Magnet", as well as the "Acme Song".
  - In the recurring segment Pinky and the Brain, which would later receive its spin-off series, the titular protagonists reside in a cage at Acme Labs.
  - In Wakko's Wish, the Animaniacs feature film, characters live in the village of Acme Falls.
- External World, a short film by David OReilly, features Acme Retirement Castle, a dystopian retirement facility for disabled cartoon characters.
- In the 1998 Spanish film The Miracle of P. Tinto, Acme is referenced along with an equally fictional competing Spanish business, Mikasa. When a Mikasa product appears on screen, it is announced in the same tone as Acme products are in the Spanish dubbing of Looney Tunes.
- In the 1978 animated special Raggedy Ann and Andy in The Great Santa Claus Caper (written, directed and co-produced by Chuck Jones), Acme is credited as making Gloopstick, touted as a clear and indestructible compound to preserve toys perfectly. Gloopstick is brought to Santa Claus' workshop by "inefficiency expert" Alexander Graham Wolf, who strongly resembles Wile E. Coyote in appearance and voice.

=== Music ===
- Bell X1's song "One Stringed Harp" includes the lyric "Like Wile E. Coyote/As if the fall wasn't enough/Those bastards from Acme/They got more nasty stuff".
- The Brazilian thrash metal band Chakal has a song titled "Acme Dead End Road" from its 1990 album, The Man Is His Own Jackal. The song begins with the Road Runner signature sound "beep, beep".

=== Legal humor ===
- Joey Green wrote "Cliff-hanger Justice", a fictional account of a product liability lawsuit by Wile E. Coyote against Acme, which appeared in three parts in the August, September, and October 1982 issues of National Lampoon magazine.
- Ian Frazier wrote a fictional legal complaint "Coyote v. Acme", which was published in The New Yorker in 1990 and later became the title piece of a short fiction collection. The story was the inspiration for the film Coyote vs. Acme, which was released in 2026.

=== Other ===
- The Comprehensive Perl Archive Network provides an "Acme::" namespace that contains many humorous, useless, and abstract modules for the Perl programming language. It was named "in homage to that greatest of all absurd system creators: Wile E. Coyote."
- ACME Communications was a former U.S. broadcasting company established by former Fox Broadcasting Company executive Jamie Kellner. The stations were affiliated with Warner Bros.' broadcast television network The WB, for which he was also a founding executive, and the Acme name was a reference to the cartoon.
- ACME Night was a Cartoon Network block.

=== Video games ===
In marathon (2026) Cyberacme is the name of the corporation that is responsible for operational systems and digital logistics of many in-universe software. The AI assisstant that guides the player and comments on things happening in game is an AI produced by Cyberacme.

== Cultural impact ==
- In 2011, Forbes ranked Acme as the second largest fictional corporation.
- ACME is used when the name of a hypothetical company is required, just as "Smith" might be for a person's name.

== See also ==
- Ajax name brand of the Mickey Mouse universe
- List of filmmakers' signatures
