= Matthew O'Callaghan =

American film director

- Born: Chicago, Illinois, US
- Other name: Matt O'Callaghan
- Occupations: Film director; writer; animator; storyboard artist
- Years active: 1981–present
- Known for: Life with Louie
- Notable work: Mickey's Twice Upon a Christmas; Curious George; Looney Tunes short films

Matthew O'Callaghan is an American film director, animator, writer, and storyboard artist whose credits include directing the 2006 film Curious George and co-creating the television series Life with Louie.

== Life and career ==
In 1995, he co-created the animated sitcom series Life with Louie which ran from 1995 to 1998.

He worked on various Warner Bros. and Looney Tunes projects such as Coyote Falls, Fur of Flying, I Tawt I Taw a Puddy Tat, Flash in the Pain, Rabid Rider, and Daffy's Rhapsody, in which he served as the director for all three short films, in which the shorts debuted in 2010, focusing on Wile E. Coyote and the Road Runner. For his work on Daffy's Rhapsody, he was nominated at the Annecy International Animation Film Festival in 2012.

Meanwhile, back in 2006, O'Callaghan directed Curious George, a film starring Frank Welker as the titular title character and based on the popular children's books created by Margret and H. A. Rey. He served as one of the storyboard artists on for Space Jam: A New Legacy, a sequel to the 1996 film Space Jam which starred Michael Jordan. Meanwhile back in 1987, he, along with Darrell Van Citters, directed the Disney television special Sport Goofy in Soccermania.

He directed and produced Open Season's sequel Open Season 2. He served as the creative talent of Mickey's Christmas Carol, which marked the return of Mickey Mouse after the 1953 short, The Simple Things. He was an additional animator in the 1988 film Who Framed Roger Rabbit. In 1989, he served as the storyboard artist and directing animator for Disney's The Little Mermaid. He created the 1993 animated series titled for The Itsy Bitsy Spider, a television series sequel to the film for Itsy Bitsy Spider, directed by O'Callaghan.

== Filmography ==
=== Film and television ===
Title	Year	Role
Mickey's Christmas Carol	1983	The creative talent of
The Black Cauldron	1985	Assistant animator
The Great Mouse Detective	1986	Character animator, story adapted by, storyboard artist (uncredited)
Sport Goofy in Soccermania	1987	Director, alongside Darrell Van Citters
Who Framed Roger Rabbit	1988	Animator: additional animator
The Little Mermaid	1989	Storyboard artist, directing animator
Rover Dangerfield	1991	Storyboard artist, character designer, sequence director, character animator
Itsy Bitsy Spider	1992	Director
Itsy Bitsy Spider: The Series	1993-1996	Creator, executive creative consultant (1 episode)
Life with Louie: A Christmas Surprise for Mrs. Stillman	1994	Director, character designer
The Pagemaster	1994	Character animator
Asterix Conquers America	1994	Animator
Life with Louie	1995-1998	Creator, teleplay (2 episodes), story (2 episodes), character designer, director (21 episodes), executive producer (12 episode), co-producer (9 episodes), story editor (8 episodes)
Cats Don't Dance	1997	Storyboard artist
Inspector Gadget	1999	Animation supervisor: Gadgetmobile, DQI
Mission to Mars	2000	Animation supervisor: Dream Quest Images
102 Dalmatians	2000	Visual effects supervisor
Family Guy	2000	Storyboards (1 episode)
Shrek	2001	Pre-production: Los Angeles
Snow Dogs	2002	Animation supervisors
Mickey's Twice Upon a Christmas	2004	Director, screenplay ("Christmas Impossible"), dialogue director, story ("Mickey's Dog-Gone Christmas")
Curious George	2006	Director
The Curiosity of Chance	2006	Special thanks
Cinderella III: A Twist in Time	2007	Storyboard artist
National Lampoon's Bag Boy	2007	Storyboard artist
Open Season 2	2008	Director, producer
Disney's A Christmas Carol	2009	Motion Capture Artist
Coyote Falls	2010	Director
Fur of Flying	2010	Director
Rabid Rider	2010	Director
I Tawt I Taw a Puddy Tat	2011	Director, story
Daffy's Rhapsody	2012	Director, story
Wild About Safety: Timon and Pumbaa Safety Smart on the Go	2013	Animation director
Trans World Sport	2014	Producer
Flash in the Pain	2014	Director
Alvin and the Chipmunks: The Road Chip	2015	Animation supervisor
Space Jam: A New Legacy	2021	Storyboard Artist

== Awards and nominations ==
- Annecy International Animated Film Festival (2012) - Nominated for Daffy's Rhapsody (2012)
- Chicago International Film Festival (1992) - Nominated for Best Short Film on Itsy Bitsy Spider (1992)
- Daytime Emmy Awards (1999) - Nominated for Outstanding Special Class Animated Program for Life with Louie (1995)
- DVD Exclusive Awards (2005) - Nominated for Best Screenplay (for a DVD Premiere Movie) on Mickey's Twice Upon a Christmas (2004)
- Edgar Allan Poe Awards (1987) - Nominated for Best Motion Picture on The Great Mouse Detective (1986)
- Humanitas Prize (1998) - Nominated for Children's Animation Category for Life with Louie (1995)
