= Happy Feet Two =

2011 animated film by George Miller

- Theatrical release poster
- Directed by: George Miller
- Written by: George Miller; Gary Eck; Warren Coleman; Paul Livingston
- Produced by: George Miller; Bill Miller; Doug Mitchell
- Starring: Elijah Wood; Robin Williams; Hank Azaria; Alecia Moore; Brad Pitt; Matt Damon; Sofia Vergara; Common; Ava Acres; Hugo Weaving; Richard Carter; Magda Szubanski; Anthony LaPaglia
- Cinematography: David Dulac; David Peers
- Edited by: Christian Gazal
- Music by: John Powell
- Production companies: Warner Bros. Pictures; Village Roadshow Pictures; Kennedy Miller Mitchell; Dr. D Studios
- Distributed by: Warner Bros. Pictures (International); Roadshow Entertainment (Australia & New Zealand)
- Release dates: November 18, 2011 (United States); December 26, 2011 (Australia)
- Running time: 99 minutes
- Countries: Australia; United States
- Language: English
- Budget: $135 million
- Box office: $159.2 million

Happy Feet Two is a 2011 animated jukebox musical comedy film directed and co-written by George Miller. It is the sequel to the 2006 film Happy Feet. Elijah Wood, Robin Williams, Hugo Weaving, Magda Szubanski and Anthony LaPaglia reprise their roles from the first film, with Hank Azaria, Alecia Moore, Brad Pitt, Matt Damon, Sofia Vergara, Common, Ava Acres and Richard Carter joining the cast. In the film, young penguin Erik, the son of Mumble and Gloria, who is reluctant to dance, runs away from home and encounters the Mighty Sven, a tufted puffin. When the penguins are trapped by a giant wall of ice and snow, they must save Antarctica.

An international co-production between the United States and Australia, Happy Feet Two was released in North American theaters on November 18, 2011, and in Australia on December 26. The film received mixed reviews, and underperformed at the box office, grossing $159 million against its $135 million budget. This resulted in the closure of Miller's Dr. D Studios, making this their only animated film.

== Plot ==
After proving the existence of humans and establishing a ban on overfishing in Antarctica, (Note: As depicted in Happy Feet (2006)) Erik, the son of Mumble and Gloria, cannot dance like the other penguins of Emperor-Land. He and his friends Bo and Atticus follow one of Mumble's friends, Ramón, the leader of the Amigos, to Adélie-Land. There, they meet its leader, the flying penguin con artist Sven, who, after surviving the loss of his native fishing grounds because of his ability to fly, partnered with Mumble's friend Lovelace, who was fired from his job as Guru. They tell the others that they were rescued by humans but fled to Antarctica after believing that they would be eaten. There, Sven performs his first miracles by revealing moss to the locals and using his power of "Sven Think" to help Ramón to find his potential mate Carmen, who is uninterested. Mumble finds the kids and tells them to return to Emperor-Land, with encouragement from Sven.

Meanwhile, Will, an adventurous and existentialist krill, is determined to discover life beyond the swarm, with his best friend, Bill, following him to ensure his safety. After being separated from the swarm, they realize that they are at the bottom of the food chain, and Will tries to move up, with Bill reluctantly joining him. Mumble tells Erik that he is unique and will one day find his calling, but he is still enthralled with Sven. While trying to cross an ice bridge, Bryan the elephant seal and his two sons refuse to let the penguins pass. An argument results with Bryan falling off the bridge and being trapped, but Mumble lures a leopard seal to chase him into the ice, freeing Bryan and earning his respect. However, Erik attributes the rescue to his attempt to use "Sven Think", much to Mumble's dismay.

On returning to Emperor-Land, the penguins discover that a large iceberg has trapped the emperor penguins in a pit surrounded by ice walls. While Mumble, Erik and Atticus deliver their supply of fish to the stranded penguins, Bo returns to Adélie-Land to seek help. The next morning, a large flock of skua attack the emperor penguins, and although Noah the Elder encourages them to fight back, all hope seems lost until Bo returns with Sven, who begins a cooperative effort to feed the emperor penguins by hunting fish.

The humans who rescued Sven and Lovelace return to Antarctica to help, but a blizzard causes them to flee. Erik urges Sven to teach the penguins how to fly, but Sven reveals that he is not really a penguin, but a tufted puffin. Mumble begins to tap dance, leading the penguins in a dance that weakens the ice, but several chunks break loose, sending Bo, Atticus, Carmen, Lovelace and several other penguins falling into the crevice. Ramón realizes that Carmen is trapped and jumps down to be with her, finally winning her love. Sven proves himself as a worthy dancer and leads the Adélies in a dance while Erik and Mumble go to seek Bryan's help. Meanwhile, a reformed Will reunites with Bill and their flock, and Bill reveals that they are now legends because of their journey.

Mumble and Erik arrive at Elephant Seal Beach, where Bryan is in the middle of a dominance fight. Mumble pleads for help, but Bryan declines because of his Beach Master duties. Using his singing abilities, Erik praises Mumble for his bravery and condemns Bryan for refusing to help after Mumble rescued him. The elephant seals travel en-masse to Emperor-Land, where Mumble, Gloria, Erik, the emperor penguins, the elephant seals, Will, Bill, their krill swarm and Sven work together to destroy the iceberg, after which Mumble and Erik reunite with Gloria.

== Voice cast ==
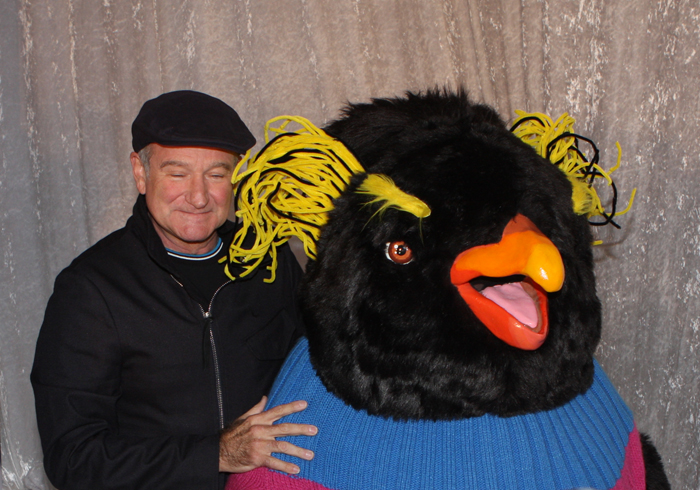
Robin Williams, who voiced Ramon and Lovelace, at the film's Australian premiere in Sydney with a Lovelace plush.

- Ava Acres as Erik, Gloria and Mumble's only son, and Memphis and Norma Jean's grandson. His singing voice is provided by E. G. Daily, who voiced Baby Mumble in the original film.
- Elijah Wood as Mumble, Gloria's husband and Erik's father.
- Alecia Moore as Gloria, Mumble's wife and Erik's mother. Alecia Moore replaces Brittany Murphy, who died in 2009.
- Robin Williams as Ramón and Lovelace, Mumble's friends. Ramón is a laid-back Adélie penguin who speaks with a Spanish accent, and Lovelace is a spiritual rockhopper penguin and Sven's partner; Williams is also the film's narrator. This was his last animated feature before his death in 2014.
- Hank Azaria as The Mighty Sven, a tufted puffin who speaks in a Scandinavian accent and is a con artist. He is also the ruler of Adélie-Land.
- Meibh Campbell as Bodicea "Bo", Miss Viola's daughter and Erik's friend. Her singing voice is provided by E. G. Daily.
- Benjamin "Lil' P-Nut" Flores Jr. as Atticus, Seymour's son and Erik's friend.
- Common as Seymour, Atticus's father. Common replaces Fat Joe.
- Magda Szubanski as Miss Viola, Bo's mother.
- Hugo Weaving as Noah the Elder, Emperor-Land's mayor and the leader of its council of elders.
- Brad Pitt as Will the Krill.
- Matt Damon as Bill the Krill.
- Sofia Vergara as Carmen, Ramón's love interest.
- Richard Carter as Bryan the Beach Master.
- Anthony LaPaglia as Alpha Skua.
- Jai Sloper and Oscar Beard as Weaner Pups.
- Danny Mann as Brokebeak.
- Carlos Alazraqui, Johnny A. Sanchez, Lombardo Boyar and Jeffrey Garcia as Nestor, Raul, Lombardo and Rinaldo, respectively, Ramon's Adélie penguin group called "The Amigos", who speak in thick Spanish accents.
- Lee Perry as Francesco, Wayne the Challenger, Eggbert and Leopard seal.
- Roger Narayan as an Indian penguin.

== Production ==
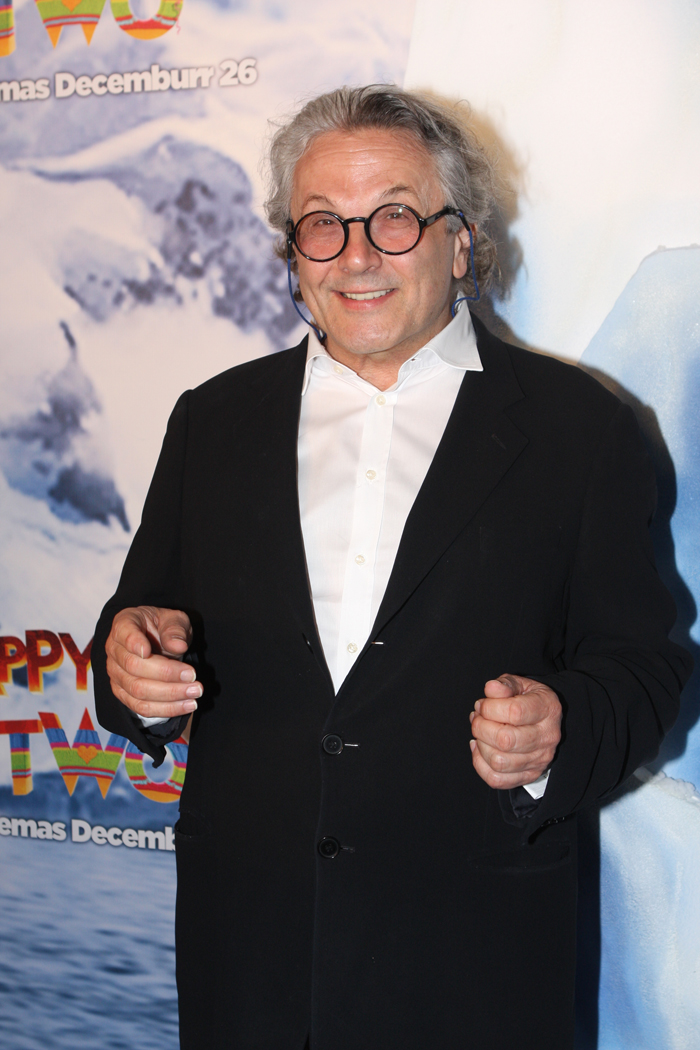
Director George Miller at the film's Australian premiere in Sydney

Elijah Wood, Robin Williams, Magda Szubanski and Hugo Weaving reprised their previous roles as Mumble, Ramón, Lovelace, Ms. Viola and Noah. Nicole Kidman and Hugh Jackman make a brief cameo as Norma Jean and Memphis. Also returning for the film are Carlos Alazraqui, Johnny A. Sanchez, Lombardo Boyar and Jeffrey Garcia as Nestor, Lombardo, Raul, and Rinaldo, respectively. Fat Joe was replaced by Common as Seymour.

Brittany Murphy, who originally voiced Mumble's love interest Gloria, was set to reprise her role and scheduled to begin recording sometime in 2010, but died from pneumonia on December 20, 2009. Steve Irwin, who voiced Trev the elephant seal and an albatross, died of a stingray injury on September 4, 2006. P!nk replaced Murphy (P!nk had already contributed a song "Tell Me Something Good" to the soundtrack of the first film). Brad Pitt and Matt Damon voiced the tiny krill, Will and Bill. Hank Azaria also signed on to voice The Mighty Sven. E.G. Daily, who played young Mumble in the previous film, played the vocals for Mumble's choreophobic son Erik and the daughter of Miss Viola, Boadicea, as well as additional voices. Sofía Vergara appears in the film as a new character, Carmen. There is a live-action scene in the movie, as was in Happy Feet. Mitchell Hicks signed up as the movie's choreographer.

== Release ==
=== Theatrical ===
The film was originally going to be accompanied by a Looney Tunes short titled Daffy's Rhapsody, but it instead was released alongside another Looney Tunes short titled I Tawt I Taw a Puddy Tat.

=== Home media ===
The DVD, Blu-ray and 3D Blu-ray releases of Happy Feet Two were released on March 13, 2012, from Warner Home Video.

== Reception ==
=== Box office ===
The film grossed $64 million in the United States, along with $86 million in other territories, for a worldwide total of $150.4 million. Produced on a budget of $135 million, the film ended up losing around $40 million for the studio.

In its opening weekend, Happy Feet Two earned $21,237,068 while playing on 3,606 screens. This was barely half of the $41,533,432 that the first Happy Feet made in its opening weekend in November 2006. Approximately 50% of Happy Feet Two's box-office take came from the 2,825 screens that showed it in 3D. Thus, when adjusted for ticket price inflation, Happy Feet Two achieved less than 45% of the attendance figures of its predecessor. Major box-office prediction websites were almost unanimously predicting an opening weekend of $35 million – $45 million, so Happy Feet Two's box-office performance was underwhelming. Among 2011's animated films, Happy Feet Two's opening weekend ranks eighth. Kurt Orzeck of the Vancouver Sun reported that "due to the poor performance of Happy Feet Two, 600 of the 700 employees at the Sydney-based Dr. D. Studios, the digital production studio behind the animated movie, have reportedly received their walking papers".

=== Critical response ===
On the review aggregator website Rotten Tomatoes, 45% of 121 critics' reviews are positive, with an average rating of 5.50/10. The website's consensus reads: "The animation is as eye-popping as ever, but Happy Feet Two's narrative is too noisily incoherent to recapture the Oscar-winning charm of its predecessor." On Metacritic, the film has a score of 50 out of 100 based on reviews from 35 critics, indicating "mixed or average" reviews. Audiences polled by CinemaScore gave the film an average grade of "B+" on a scale of A+ to F.

Richard Corliss of Time gave the film a positive review and said that Miller is "not content to duplicate the pleasures of his first penguin film; he dares to go bigger, deeper, higher — happier".

Roger Ebert of the Chicago Sun-Times gave the film two and a half stars out of four. He wrote, "The animation is bright and attractive, the music gives the characters something to do, but the movie has too much dialogue in the areas of philosophy and analysis."

British newspaper The Telegraph named Happy Feet Two one of the ten worst films of 2011, saying, "Happy Feet Two is an appalling 3D animated sequel about a colony of all‑singin', all-dancin', all-infuriatin' penguins."

=== Accolades ===
Award	Category	Recipient	Result
Central Ohio Film Critics Association Awards	Actor of the Year	Brad Pitt (also for The Tree of Life and Moneyball)	Nominated
Houston Film Critics Society Awards	Best Animated Film		Nominated
San Diego Film Critics Society Awards	Best Animated Film		Nominated
Satellite Awards	Best Original Song	"Bridge of Light" by P!nk and Billy Mann	Nominated

== Video game ==
Happy Feet Two: The Video Game, released on November 8, 2011, was developed by KMM Games for PlayStation 3, Xbox 360 and Wii. WayForward Technologies developed the Nintendo 3DS and Nintendo DS versions, published by Warner Bros.

== Soundtrack ==
The soundtrack album for the film was released by WaterTower Music on CD on November 21, 2011, and on iTunes on November 15, 2011. Unlike the previous film's two album releases—one for its songs and one for its score—both the songs and John Powell's score are included on this album. The songs "Happy Feet Two Opening Medley", "Bridge of Light" and "Under Pressure/Rhythm Nation" are led by P!nk, who lends her vocals to the character Gloria, taking the place of Brittany Murphy from the first film.

The deluxe edition of the album contains an additional 5 songs performed by Ozomatli. These and other songs can also be found on the soundtrack for the video game, which was released on iTunes on November 8, 2011.

== Future ==
When director George Miller was asked if he had any plans for Happy Feet Three, he replied:

If you put a gun to my head and said, "You have to come up with a story for Happy Feet Three", I'd say shoot me. I would have no idea. I really would have no idea. The stories creep up on you. You just have to allow the stories to come, and then they get in like little ear worms in your head and they won't go away. If that happens and we've got the energy, we'll do a third one. If it doesn't happen, it doesn't happen. That's the only way you can do it. It has to be authentic. I really wanted to make this film better than the first one. Otherwise, at my age, what's the point? You really want to make it better. If something comes up that's really exciting and I can convey that enthusiasm to other people, then there would be a third one.

— George Miller
