= Yearim =

South Korean animation studio

Yearim Productions Co., Ltd. (주)예림프로덕션
- Industry: Animation
- Founded: 1991; 35 years ago
- Headquarters: Official office: Seoul, South Korea; International office: Los Angeles, U.S.

Yearim Productions Co., Ltd., (Korean: (주)예림프로덕션, romanized: (Ju) Yerim Peurodeoksyeon) founded in 1991, is a full service 2D (including digital animation) South Korean animation studio located in Seoul, South Korea with a satellite office in Los Angeles.

== Shows ==
Show	Year(s)	Co-production(s)	Notes
Jumanji	1996–1998	Interscope Communications, Teiter Film, Adelaide Productions and Columbia TriStar Television	
Extreme Ghostbusters	1997	Adelaide Productions and Columbia TriStar Television	
Channel Umptee-3	1997	Adelaide Productions, Act III Productions, Enchanté George and Columbia TriStar Television	
Dragon Tales	1999–2005	Sesame Workshop, Adelaide Productions and Sony Pictures Television	
Baby Looney Tunes	2002–2005	Warner Bros. Animation	
The Freshman	2002		
3-South	2002–2003	Hentemann Films, Warner Bros. Television Animation and MTV Animation	
Duck Dodgers	2003–2005	Warner Bros. Family Entertainment and Warner Bros. Animation	
Free for All	2003	Film Roman and Showtime Networks	
American Dad!	2005–present	Underdog Productions, Fuzzy Door Productions, 20th Television and 20th Television Animation	
Tom and Jerry Tales	2006–2008	Turner Entertainment Co., Warner Bros. Animation and Warner Bros. Family Entertainment	
Me, Eloise!	2006	HandMade Films and Starz Media	
Family Guy	2008–2010	Fuzzy Door Productions and 20th Television	
The Looney Tunes Show	2011–2014	Warner Bros. Animation	
The Cleveland Show	2011–2012	Persons Unknown Productions, Happy Jack Productions, Fuzzy Door Productions and 20th Century Fox Television	
Gravity Falls	2014–2015	Disney Television Animation	7 episodes of Season 2
New Looney Tunes	2015–2020	Warner Bros. Animation	
Bordertown	2016	Bento Box Entertainment, Hentemann Films, Fuzzy Door Productions and 20th Century Fox Television	
Big Mouth	2017	Good at Bizness, Inc., Fathouse Industries, Danger Goldberg Productions and Titmouse, Inc.	
Bless the Harts	2019–2021	Jessebean, Inc., Lord Miller Productions, Fox Entertainment and Titmouse, Inc.	
Central Park	2020–2022	Wilo Productions, Angry Child Productions, Bento Box Entertainment, Brillstein Entertainment Partners, 20th Television and 20th Television Animation	
Looney Tunes Cartoons	2020–2022	Warner Bros. Animation	
Kiff	2023–present	Titmouse, Inc. and Disney Television Animation	
Angry Birds Mystery Island	2024	Rovio Animation, Rovio Entertainment, Amazon MGM Studios and Titmouse, Inc.	3 episodes

== Films ==
Film	Year(s)	Co-production(s)	Notes
Walmart: Commercial Spot	2003		
Baby Looney Tunes' Eggs-traordinary Adventure	2003	Warner Bros. Animation	
Garfield: The Movie	2004	20th Century Fox and Davis Entertainment Company	Opening title sequence only
Daffy Duck for President	2004	Warner Bros. Animation	
Tom and Jerry: The Fast and the Furry	2005	Turner Entertainment Co. and Warner Bros. Animation	
The Karate Guard	2005	Turner Entertainment Co. and Warner Bros. Animation	
Tom and Jerry: Shiver Me Whiskers	2006	Turner Entertainment Co. and Warner Bros. Animation	
TV Spot for World Cup	2006		
Tom and Jerry: A Nutcracker Tale	2007	Warner Bros. Animation, Turner Entertainment Co. and Warner Bros. Family Entertainment	
Down the Tubes	2007		
Two Dreadful Children	2007		
Tom and Jerry Meet Sherlock Holmes	2010	Warner Bros. Animation	
Tom and Jerry & the Wizard of Oz	2011	Turner Entertainment Co. and Warner Bros. Animation	
Happiness Is a Warm Blanket, Charlie Brown	2011	Warner Premiere, Peanuts Worldwide, Wildbrain Entertainment and Schulz Productions	
Tom and Jerry: Robin Hood and His Merry Mouse	2012	Warner Premiere, Turner Entertainment Co. and Warner Bros. Animation	
Tom and Jerry's Giant Adventure	2013	Turner Entertainment Co. and Warner Bros. Animation	
Tom and Jerry: The Lost Dragon	2014	Turner Entertainment Co. and Warner Bros. Animation	
The Flintstones & WWE: Stone Age SmackDown!	2015	Warner Bros. Animation and WWE Studios	
Tom and Jerry: Spy Quest	2015	Turner Entertainment Co., Hanna-Barbera and Warner Bros. Animation	
Tom and Jerry: Back to Oz	2016	Warner Bros. Animation	
The Jetsons & WWE: Robo-WrestleMania!	2017	Warner Bros. Animation, Hanna-Barbera Cartoons and WWE Studios	
Phineas and Ferb the Movie: Candace Against the Universe	2020	Disney Television Animation	
