= Dubbing Brothers =

French dubbing studio

- Company type: Dubbing
- Industry: Dubbing and subtitling
- Predecessor: Sonodi
- Founded: 1989
- Founders: Philippe Taïeb; Fred Taïeb
- Headquarters: Paris, France; With 4 facilities in: Rome, Italy; Munich, Germany; Burbank, United States; Brussels, Belgium; Madrid, Spain
- Key people: Philippe Taïeb
- Subsidiaries: Interopa Film; FFS Film- & Fernseh-Synchron GmbH; Ad Hoc Studios; Eurotroll
- Website: www.dubbing-brothers.com

Dubbing Brothers is a French dubbing studio based in La Plaine Saint-Denis, France with four facilities in Italy, the United States, Belgium, and Germany with a partnership in Spain. The company was founded in 1989. Philippe Taïeb is president of the company.

== Clients ==
- Warner Bros.
  - Cartoon Network
- Viacom
  - Paramount Pictures
  - Nickelodeon
- JibJab
- Universal Studios
  - DreamWorks Animation
- Disney
- Netflix
- Apple
  - Apple TV

== Filmography ==
- Camp Lazlo
- Phineas and Ferb
- Cowboy Bebop: The Movie
- Pokémon: The Movie 2000
- Porco Rosso
- Cougar Town
- Tekkon Kinkreet
- Transporter 3
- Resident Evil: Degeneration
- The Crimson Rivers
- Final Flight of the Osiris
- LazyTown
- Kingsman: The Secret Service
- Kingsman: The Golden Circle
- Evangelion: 1.0 You Are (Not) Alone
- Evangelion: 2.0 You Can (Not) Advance
- Evangelion: 3.0 You Can (Not) Redo
- Tom and Jerry Tales
- Mickey Mouse Clubhouse
- New Looney Tunes
- The Looney Tunes Show
- Winx Club (seasons 1–5)
- Miraculous: Tales of Ladybug & Cat Noir
- Tom and Jerry: The Magic Ring
- Tom and Jerry: Blast Off to Mars
- Tom and Jerry: The Fast and the Furry
- Tom and Jerry: Shiver Me Whiskers
- Tom and Jerry: A Nutcracker Tale
- Looney Tunes Cartoons
- Tom and Jerry: Robin Hood and His Merry Mouse
- Tom and Jerry's Giant Adventure
- Tom and Jerry: The Lost Dragon
- Tom and Jerry: Spy Quest
- King Tweety
- Looney Tunes: Rabbits Run
- What's New, Scooby-Doo?
- Shaggy & Scooby-Doo Get a Clue!
- Scooby-Doo! Mystery Incorporated
- Be Cool, Scooby-Doo!
- Scooby-Doo and Guess Who?
- Winx Club: The Secret of the Lost Kingdom
- Winx Club 3D: Magical Adventure
- Winx Club: The Mystery of the Abyss
- Duck Dodgers
- Teen Titans
- Teen Titans Go!
- X-Men: Evolution
- Kiff
- Ducktales
- Big Hero 6: The Series
- Mickey Mouse Works
- Tweety's High-Flying Adventure
- Space Jam
- Space Jam: A New Legacy
- The Croods
- The Croods: A New Age
- Trolls
- Trolls World Tour
- Trolls Band Together
- Batman: Year One
- Son of Batman
- Batman: Bad Blood
- Batman Unlimited: Animal Instincts
- Batman Unlimited: Monster Mayhem
- The Batman
- Batman: Assault on Arkham
- Superman: Unbound
- Daphne & Velma
- Miracle at Midnight
- Jackie Chan Adventures
- Grave of the Fireflies (Netflix dub)
- In Your Dreams (film)
- Dino Girl Gauko
