= CN Rewind =

- Country: India
- Headquarters: Mumbai, India

Programming
- Languages: English, Hindi
- Picture format: 480p (SD), 720p (HD), 1080p (FHD)

Ownership
- Owner: Warner Bros. Discovery India

History
- Launched: 11 December 2024

CN Rewind is a digital add-on channel launched in India on 11 December 2024 by Warner Bros. Discovery India, in partnership with Amazon Prime Video India. The channel focuses on curated classic programming from Cartoon Network's library, offering animated series and films from the 1990s and 2000s, primarily aimed at nostalgia-driven adult viewers as well as family audiences.

CN Rewind is available exclusively as a paid add-on subscription on Prime Video India and features content in both English and Hindi, including remastered episodes and select dubbed versions. The service was introduced as part of Warner Bros. Discovery's strategy to monetise its legacy animation catalogue through digital distribution in the Indian market.

== Programming ==
CN Rewind features a curated selection of classic animated television series, animated films, and specials originally broadcast on Cartoon Network, along with select live-action media. The service primarily focuses on legacy content from the 1990s and 2000s.

=== Television series ===
The following animated series are available on CN Rewind catalog:

- A Pup Named Scooby-Doo
- Baby Looney Tunes
- Batman: The Animated Series
- Be Cool, Scooby-Doo!
- Codename: Kids Next Door
- Courage the Cowardly Dog
- Dexter's Laboratory
- Duck Dodgers
- Ed, Edd n Eddy
- Justice League
- Johnny Bravo
- My Gym Partner's a Monkey
- Samurai Jack
- Scooby-Doo and Guess Who?
- Scooby-Doo and Scrappy-Doo
- Scooby-Doo! Mystery Incorporated
- Scooby-Doo, Where Are You!
- Shaggy & Scooby-Doo Get a Clue!
- SWAT Kats: The Radical Squadron
- Taz-Mania
- The Looney Tunes Show
- The Powerpuff Girls
- The Sylvester & Tweety Mysteries
- The Tom and Jerry Show
- ThunderCats (2011)
- Tom and Jerry Tales
- What's New, Scooby-Doo?

=== Feature films ===
The following animated films and direct-to-video features are included in CN Rewind's catalogue on Prime Video India.

- Aloha, Scooby-Doo!
- Bugs Bunny's 1001 Rabbit Tales
- Chill Out, Scooby-Doo!
- Ed, Edd n Eddy's Big Picture Show
- Lego Scooby-Doo! Blowout Beach Bash
- Looney Tunes: Rabbits Run
- Scooby-Doo! in Where's My Mummy?
- Scooby-Doo! Abracadabra-Doo
- Scooby-Doo! Camp Scare
- Scooby-Doo! Frankencreepy
- Scooby-Doo! Mask of the Blue Falcon
- Scooby-Doo! Moon Monster Madness
- Scooby-Doo! Pirates Ahoy!
- Scooby-Doo! Stage Fright
- Scooby-Doo! and Kiss: Rock and Roll Mystery
- Scooby-Doo and the Cyber Chase
- Scooby-Doo and the Goblin King
- Scooby-Doo and the Legend of the Vampire
- Scooby-Doo and the Monster of Mexico
- Scooby-Doo on Zombie Island
- Tom and Jerry: A Nutcracker Tale
- Tom and Jerry: Back to Oz
- Tom and Jerry: Blast Off to Mars
- Tom and Jerry: The Fast and the Furry
- Tom and Jerry Meet Sherlock Holmes
- Tom and Jerry: Robin Hood and His Merry Mouse
- Tom and Jerry: Spy Quest
- Tom and Jerry: Willy Wonka and the Chocolate Factory
- Tom and Jerry & the Wizard of Oz
- The Flintstones & WWE: Stone Age SmackDown!

=== TV Specials ===
The following animated television specials are included in CN Rewind's catalogue on Prime Video India.

- A Johnny Bravo Christmas
- A Scooby-Doo! Christmas
- Bugs Bunny's Lunar Tunes
- Happy Halloween, Scooby-Doo!
- Lego Scooby-Doo! Blowout Beach Bash
- Scooby-Doo! Haunted Holidays
- Scooby-Doo! Spooky Games
- Scooby-Doo! and the Beach Beastie

=== Live-action feature ===
Select live-action associated with Cartoon Network properties are also available:

- Scooby-Doo (2002)
- Scooby-Doo 2: Monsters Unleashed
- Scooby-Doo! The Mystery Begins
- Scooby-Doo! Curse of the Lake Monster
- Tom & Jerry (2021)

== Availability and pricing ==
CN Rewind launched in India on 11 December 2024 as a digital add-on channel curated by Warner Bros. Discovery and made available exclusively on Amazon Prime Video India.

The service is offered as an optional add-on subscription for Prime members. At launch, Prime Video India announced an introductory price of ₹199 per year, with a standard renewal price of ₹249 per year, billed through the user's Prime Video account.

CN Rewind's catalogue is available in English and Hindi (dubbed) audio options where supported.
