= List of films based on Hanna-Barbera cartoons =

Since 1964, various animated and live-action theatrically released films based on Hanna-Barbera cartoons have been created and released in theaters. While alive, Joseph Barbera and William Hanna (the founders of Hanna-Barbera) were involved with each production in some capacity.

== Theatrical films list ==
Release Date	Type	Title	Production Company(s)	Distributor(s)	Director(s)
June 3, 1964	Animated	Hey There, It's Yogi Bear!	Hanna-Barbera Productions	Columbia Pictures	Joseph Barbera, William Hanna
August 3, 1966	Animated	The Man Called Flintstone	Hanna-Barbera Productions	Columbia Pictures	Joseph Barbera, William Hanna
July 6, 1990	Animated	Jetsons: The Movie	Hanna-Barbera Productions	Universal Pictures	Joseph Barbera, William Hanna
May 27, 1994	Live-action	The Flintstones	Amblin Entertainment, Hanna-Barbera Productions	Universal Pictures	Brian Levant
April 28, 2000	Live-action	The Flintstones in Viva Rock Vegas	Amblin Entertainment, Hanna-Barbera Productions	Universal Pictures	Brian Levant
June 14, 2002	Live-action	Scooby-Doo	Mosaic Media Group, Atlas Entertainment	Warner Bros. Pictures	Raja Gosnell
July 3, 2002	Animated	The Powerpuff Girls Movie	Cartoon Network Studios	Warner Bros. Pictures	Craig McCracken
March 26, 2004	Live-action	Scooby-Doo 2: Monsters Unleashed	Mosaic Media Group	Warner Bros. Pictures	Raja Gosnell
December 17, 2010	Live-action	Yogi Bear	Sunswept Entertainment, De Line Pictures, Rhythm and Hues Studios	Warner Bros. Pictures	Eric Brevig
September 16, 2011	Animated	Top Cat: The Movie	Ánima Estudios, Illusion Studios	Warner Bros Pictures, Vertigo Films (UK)	Alberto Mar
October 30, 2015	Animated	Top Cat Begins	Ánima Estudios, Discreet Arts Production	Warner Bros. Pictures, Kaleidoscope Film Distribution (UK)	Andrés Couturier
May 15, 2020	Animated	Scoob!	Warner Animation Group	Warner Bros. Pictures	Tony Cervone
TBA	Animated	Meet the Flintstones	Warner Bros. Pictures Animation	Warner Bros. Pictures	Todd Wilderman, Hamish Grieve

== Direct-to-video and TV movies ==
Release Date	Title	Production Company(s)	Director(s)
September 16, 1972	Yogi's Ark Lark	Hanna-Barbera Productions	William Hanna, Joseph Barbera
November 25, 1972	The Banana Splits in Hocus Pocus Park (Live-action and animation)	Hanna-Barbera Productions	William Hanna, Joseph Barbera
December 23, 1979	Scooby Goes Hollywood	Hanna-Barbera Productions	Ray Patterson
November 21, 1980	Yogi's First Christmas	Hanna-Barbera Productions	Ray Patterson
September 20, 1987	Yogi's Great Escape	Hanna-Barbera Productions	Bob Goe, Paul Sommer, Rudy Zamora
October 18, 1987	Scooby-Doo Meets the Boo Brothers	Hanna-Barbera Productions	Dennis Marks
November 15, 1987	The Jetsons Meet the Flintstones	Hanna-Barbera Productions	Don Lusk
November 22, 1987	Yogi Bear and the Magical Flight of the Spruce Goose	Hanna-Barbera Productions	Ray Patterson, John Kimball, Art Davis, Rudy Zamora, Jay Sarbry, Oscar Dufau, Paul Sommer
March 20, 1988	Top Cat and the Beverly Hills Cats	Hanna-Barbera Productions	Paul Sommer, Charles A. Nichols
May 15, 1988	The Good, the Bad, and Huckleberry Hound	Hanna-Barbera Productions	Bob Goe, John Kimball, Charles A. Nichols, Jay Sarbry
September 18, 1988	Rockin' with Judy Jetson	Hanna-Barbera Productions	Paul Sommer
October 16, 1988	Scooby-Doo and the Ghoul School	Hanna-Barbera Productions	Charles A. Nichols
November 13, 1988	Scooby-Doo! and the Reluctant Werewolf	Hanna-Barbera Productions	Ray Patterson
November 20, 1988	Yogi and the Invasion of the Space Bears	Hanna-Barbera Productions	Don Lusk, Ray Patterson
February 7, 1993	I Yabba-Dabba Do!	Hanna-Barbera Productions	William Hanna
April 4, 1993	Jonny's Golden Quest	Hanna-Barbera Productions	Don Lusk, Paul Sommer
December 5, 1993	Hollyrock-a-Bye Baby	Hanna-Barbera Productions	William Hanna
September 3, 1994	Scooby-Doo! in Arabian Nights	Hanna-Barbera Productions	Jun Falkenstein, Joanna Romersa
November 21, 1994	A Flintstones Christmas Carol	Hanna-Barbera Productions	Joanna Romersa
November 19, 1995	Jonny Quest vs. The Cyber Insects	Hanna-Barbera Productions	Mario Piluso
September 22, 1998	Scooby-Doo on Zombie Island	Warner Bros. Animation, Hanna-Barbera Productions	Jim Stenstrum
October 5, 1999	Scooby-Doo! and the Witch's Ghost	Warner Bros. Animation, Hanna-Barbera Productions	Jim Stenstrum
December 10, 1999	Dexter's Laboratory: Ego Trip	Hanna-Barbera Cartoons	Genndy Tartakovsky
October 3, 2000	Scooby-Doo and the Alien Invaders	Warner Bros. Animation, Hanna-Barbera Productions	Jim Stenstrum
October 9, 2001	Scooby-Doo and the Cyber Chase	Warner Bros. Animation, Hanna-Barbera Productions	Jim Stenstrum
November 3, 2001	The Flintstones: On the Rocks	Cartoon Network Studios	David Smith, Chris Savino
March 4, 2003	Scooby-Doo! and the Legend of the Vampire	Warner Bros. Animation, Hanna-Barbera Cartoons	Scott Jeralds
September 30, 2003	Scooby-Doo! and the Monster of Mexico	Warner Bros. Animation, Hanna-Barbera Cartoons	Scott Jeralds
June 22, 2004	Scooby-Doo! and the Loch Ness Monster	Warner Bros. Animation, Hanna-Barbera Cartoons	Scott Jeralds, Joe Sichta
February 8, 2005	Aloha, Scooby-Doo!	Warner Bros. Animation, Hanna-Barbera Cartoons	Tim Maltby
December 13, 2005	Scooby-Doo! in Where's My Mummy?	Warner Bros. Animation, Hanna-Barbera Cartoons	Joe Sichta
September 19, 2006	Scooby-Doo! Pirates Ahoy!	Warner Bros. Animation, Hanna-Barbera Cartoons	Chuck Sheetz
September 4, 2007	Chill Out, Scooby-Doo!	Warner Bros. Animation, Hanna-Barbera Cartoons	Joe Sichta
September 23, 2008	Scooby-Doo! and the Goblin King	Warner Bros. Animation, Hanna-Barbera Cartoons	Joe Sichta
April 7, 2009	Scooby-Doo! and the Samurai Sword	Warner Bros. Animation, Hanna-Barbera Cartoons	Christopher Berkeley
September 13, 2009	Scooby-Doo! The Mystery Begins (live-action)	Warner Premiere, Cartoon Network	Brian Levant
February 16, 2010	Scooby-Doo! Abracadabra-Doo	Warner Bros. Animation	Spike Brandt, Tony Cervone
September 14, 2010	Scooby-Doo! Camp Scare	Warner Bros. Animation	Ethan Spaulding
October 16, 2010	Scooby-Doo! Curse of the Lake Monster (live-action)	Warner Premiere, Cartoon Network	Brian Levant
September 6, 2011	Scooby-Doo! Legend of the Phantosaur	Warner Bros. Animation	Ethan Spaulding
November 4, 2011	Johnny Bravo Goes to Bollywood	Hanna-Barbera	Van Partible
March 13, 2012	Scooby-Doo! Music of the Vampire	Warner Bros. Animation	David Block
October 9, 2012	Big Top Scooby-Doo!	Warner Bros. Animation	Ben Jones
February 26, 2013	Scooby-Doo! Mask of the Blue Falcon	Warner Bros. Animation	Michael Goguen
July 23, 2013	Scooby-Doo! Adventures: The Mystery Map (puppetry)	Warner Bros. Animation, Spiffy Productions	Jomac Noph
August 20, 2013	Scooby-Doo! Stage Fright	Warner Bros. Animation	Victor Cook
March 25, 2014	Scooby-Doo! WrestleMania Mystery	Warner Bros. Animation, WWE Studios	Brandon Vietti
August 5, 2014	Scooby-Doo! Frankencreepy	Warner Bros. Animation	Paul McEvoy
February 3, 2015	Scooby-Doo! Moon Monster Madness	Warner Bros. Animation	Paul McEvoy
March 10, 2015	The Flintstones & WWE: Stone Age SmackDown!	Warner Bros. Animation, WWE Studios	Spike Brandt, Tony Cervone
June 23, 2015	Tom and Jerry: Spy Quest^{1}	Warner Bros. Animation	Spike Brandt, Tony Cervone
July 21, 2015	Scooby-Doo! and Kiss: Rock and Roll Mystery	Warner Bros. Animation	Spike Brandt, Tony Cervone
May 10, 2016	Lego Scooby-Doo! Haunted Hollywood (CGI)	Warner Bros. Animation, The Lego Group	Rick Morales
August 9, 2016	Scooby-Doo! and WWE: Curse of the Speed Demon	Warner Bros. Animation, WWE Studios	Tim Divar
February 14, 2017	Scooby-Doo! Shaggy's Showdown	Warner Bros. Animation	Matt Peters
March 14, 2017	The Jetsons & WWE: Robo-WrestleMania!	Warner Bros. Animation, Hanna-Barbera Cartoons, WWE Studios	Anthony Bell
July 25, 2017	Lego Scooby-Doo! Blowout Beach Bash (CGI)	Warner Bros. Animation, The Lego Group	Ethan Spaulding
January 9, 2018	Scooby-Doo! & Batman: The Brave and the Bold	Warner Bros. Animation, DC Entertainment,	Jake Castorena
May 22, 2018	Daphne & Velma (live-action)	Blondie Girl Productions, Lifeboat Productions, Blue Ribbon Content	Suzi Yoonessi
September 11, 2018	Scooby-Doo! and the Gourmet Ghost	Warner Bros. Animation	Doug Murphy
February 5, 2019	Scooby-Doo! and the Curse of the 13th Ghost	Warner Bros. Animation	Cecilia Aranovich Hamilton
August 13, 2019	The Banana Splits Movie (live-action)	Blue Ribbon Content, Blue Ice Pictures	Danishka Esterhazy
October 1, 2019	Scooby-Doo! Return to Zombie Island	Warner Bros. Animation	Cecilia Aranovich Hamilton, Ethan Spaulding
October 6, 2020	Happy Halloween, Scooby-Doo!	Warner Bros. Animation	Maxwell Atoms
February 23, 2021	Scooby-Doo! The Sword and the Scoob	Warner Bros. Animation	Maxwell Atoms
September 14, 2021	Straight Outta Nowhere: Scooby-Doo! Meets Courage the Cowardly Dog	Warner Bros. Animation, Cartoon Network Studios	Cecilia Aranovich Hamilton
October 4, 2022	Trick or Treat Scooby-Doo!	Warner Bros. Animation	Cecilia Aranovich Hamilton, Audie Harrison
September 26, 2023	Scooby-Doo! and Krypto, Too!	Warner Bros. Animation	Cecilia Aranovich Hamilton

1. Tom and Jerry: Spy Quest is based on both Jonny Quest and Tom and Jerry. However, Tom and Jerry are not considered to be Hanna-Barbera Productions characters since they were created by William Hanna and Joseph Barbera while both men were employed by Metro-Goldwyn-Mayer cartoon studio. Because of this, there are no other Tom and Jerry Feature films and DTV films included on this list.

== See also ==
- List of Scooby-Doo media
- List of The Flintstones media
- List of Tom and Jerry feature films
