= List of Tom and Jerry feature films =

This is a list of feature-length films of the Tom and Jerry franchise.

== Theatrical films ==
№	Title	Release date	Directed by	Written by	Produced by	Studio	Distributed by	Notes
1	Tom and Jerry: The Movie	October 1, 1992 (Germany); July 30, 1993 (United States)	Phil Roman	Dennis Marks	Phil Roman	Turner Entertainment Co. WMG Film; Film Roman	Miramax; Live Entertainment	
2	Tom & Jerry	February 26, 2021	Tim Story	Kevin Costello	Chris DeFaria	Warner Animation Group; The Story Company; Turner Entertainment Co.	Warner Bros. Pictures	Live-action/animated film.
3	Tom and Jerry: Forbidden Compass	August 2, 2025 (China); September 4, 2026 (United States)	Zhang Gang		Zhang Gang, Chen Bofei, Jasmine Gao, Huixia Zhang, and Shaojing Yang	Warner Bros. Pictures; Turner Entertainment Co.	Wu Zhou Film Distribution Co. Ltd.	A Chinese co-produced animated film
TBA	Untitled film	TBA	TBA	TBA	TBA	Warner Bros. Pictures Animation	Warner Bros. Pictures	

== Direct-to-video films ==
All direct-to-video films are produced by Turner Entertainment Co. and Warner Bros. Animation.

№	Title	Year	Directed by	Written by	Produced by
1	Tom and Jerry: The Magic Ring	November 12, 2001 (United Kingdom); March 12, 2002 (United States)	James Tim Walker	Tim Cahill and Julie McNally	Tom Minton
2	Tom and Jerry: Blast Off to Mars	January 18, 2005	Bill Kopp	Bill Kopp	Tom Minton
3	Tom and Jerry: The Fast and the Furry	October 11, 2005	Bill Kopp	Screenplay by: Bill Kopp; Story by: Joseph Barbera	Stephen Fossati
4	Tom and Jerry: Shiver Me Whiskers	August 22, 2006	Scott Jeralds	Christopher Painter	Tom Minton and Scott Jeralds
5	Tom and Jerry: A Nutcracker Tale	October 2, 2007	Spike Brandt and Tony Cervone	Screenplay by: Spike Brandt; Story by: Joseph Barbera	Spike Brandt and Tony Cervone
6	Tom and Jerry Meet Sherlock Holmes	August 27, 2010	Spike Brandt and Jeff Siergey	Earl Kress	Bobbie Page
7	Tom and Jerry & The Wizard of Oz	August 23, 2011	Spike Brandt and Tony Cervone	Gene Grillo	Bobbie Page and Judge Plummer
8	Tom and Jerry: Robin Hood and His Merry Mouse	September 28, 2012	Spike Brandt and Tony Cervone	Story by: Earl Kress; Screenplay by: Earl Kress and Michael F. Ryan	Spike Brandt and Tony Cervone
9	Tom and Jerry's Giant Adventure	August 6, 2013	Spike Brandt and Tony Cervone	Paul Dini	Spike Brandt and Tony Cervone
10	Tom and Jerry: The Lost Dragon	September 4, 2014	Spike Brandt and Tony Cervone	Brian Swenlin	Spike Brandt and Tony Cervone
11	Tom and Jerry: Spy Quest	June 23, 2015	Spike Brandt and Tony Cervone	Story by: Jim Krieg; Teleplay by: Jim Krieg and Heath Corson	Spike Brandt and Tony Cervone
12	Tom and Jerry: Back to Oz	June 21, 2016	Spike Brandt and Tony Cervone	Paul Dini	—N/a
13	Tom and Jerry: Willy Wonka and the Chocolate Factory	June 27, 2017	Spike Brandt	Gene Grillo	Spike Brandt
14	Tom and Jerry: Cowboy Up!	January 25, 2022	Darrell Van Citters	Story by: Will Finn; Teleplay by: William Waldner	Kimberly S. Moreau, Ashley Postlewaite and Darrell Van Citters
15	Tom and Jerry: Snowman's Land	November 15, 2022	Darrell Van Citters	Story by: Jase Ricci; Teleplay by: Will Finn and Jase Ricci	Kimberly S. Moreau, Ashley Postlewaite and Darrell Van Citters

=== Tom and Jerry Meet Sherlock Holmes ===
In Victorian era London, Tom and Jerry work together with Sherlock Holmes to stop Professor Moriarty from stealing the Crown Jewels during a solar eclipse.

Voice cast

- Spike Brandt (uncredited) as Tom Cat and Jerry Mouse
- Michael York as Sherlock Holmes
- Malcolm McDowell as Professor Moriarty
- John Rhys-Davies as Dr. Watson
- Grey DeLisle as Red
- Kath Soucie as Tuffy
- Jeff Bergman as Butch and Droopy
- Phil LaMarr as Spike and Policeman
- Greg Ellis as Tin and Sergeant
- Jess Harnell as Pan and Brett Jeremy
- Richard McGonagle as Alley and First Policeman

=== Tom and Jerry & the Wizard of Oz ===
Tom and Jerry & the Wizard of Oz is a 2011 animated musical adaptation of the 1939 Metro-Goldwyn-Mayer film The Wizard of Oz (which in turn is based on the 1900 novel The Wonderful Wizard of Oz by L. Frank Baum), with the addition of various M-G-M Cartoon stars including Tom and Jerry as characters and told through their point of view. Film scholar David McGowan observes that the film and its sequel (Tom and Jerry: Back to Oz) was only possible "due to a complicated series of mergers and acquisitions" that brought both franchises together under a single media conglomerate. The film was released on DVD and Blu-ray on August 23, 2011, by Warner Home Video. Common Sense Media rated the film 3 out of 5 stars.

Voice cast

- Spike Brandt (uncredited) as Tom Cat, Jerry Mouse
- Grey DeLisle as Dorothy Gale (Nikki Yanofsky provides Dorothy's singing voice)
- Joe Alaskey as Professor Marvel / The Wizard (the former having only a cameo at the end of the film), Butch, Droopy
- Michael Gough as Hunk / The Scarecrow
- Rob Paulsen as Hickory / The Tin Man
- Todd Stashwick as Zeke / The Cowardly Lion
- Frances Conroy as Aunt Em, Glinda
- Laraine Newman as Miss Almira Gulch / The Wicked Witch of the West
- Stephen Root as Uncle Henry, Crows
- Kath Soucie as Tuffy the Munchkin Mouse / Tuffy the Country Mouse

=== Tom and Jerry: Back to Oz ===
Tom and Jerry: Back to Oz is a 2016 animated musical fantasy comedy direct-to-video sequel to Tom and Jerry and the Wizard of Oz. Featuring five new songs written by Benj Pasek and Justin Paul (in their film songwriting debut). In the film, Tom and Jerry team up with Dorothy and her friends as they return to the Land of Oz to stop a new villain, the Nome King, from taking over Emerald City. This movie was dedicated to voice artist Joe Alaskey, who appears in his final film role after his death in February 2016.

Voice cast

- Grey Griffin as Dorothy Gale
- Jason Alexander as The Nome King (Mr. Bibb)
- Amy Pemberton as Dorothy's singing voice and The Mouse Queen
- Joe Alaskey as The Wizard of Oz, Butch, Droopy
- Michael Gough as The Scarecrow (Hunk)
- Rob Paulsen as The Tin Man (Hickory)
- Todd Stashwick as The Cowardly Lion (Zeke)
- Frances Conroy as Auntie Em and Glinda
- Laraine Newman as The Wicked Witch of the West
- Stephen Root as Uncle Henry
- Kath Soucie as Tuffy the Munchkin Mouse, Tractor
- Andrea Martin as The Hungry Tiger
- James Monroe Iglehart as Jitterbug (Calvin Carney)
- Spike Brandt as Tom Cat, Jerry Mouse (uncredited), Spike

Reception

Renee Schonfeld of Common Sense Media rated it 3 out of 5 stars, saying "By blending solid new musical numbers with the old Oz favorites and including inventive new characters, Spike Brandt, Tony Cerone, and company have made this sequel funny and original."

== Appearances in other films ==
Title	Year	Notes
Anchors Aweigh	1945	Tom appears as a servant and Jerry performs a dance number with Gene Kelly. Animation supervised by William Hanna and Joseph Barbera.
Dangerous When Wet	1953	Tom and Jerry appear in a dream sequence swimming with Esther Williams.
