= Spike (Tom and Jerry) =

Tom and Jerry characters

Spike and Tyke
- Spike (left) with Tyke
- First appearance: Unnamed Bulldog: Dog Trouble (1942); Spike: The Bodyguard (1944); Tyke: Love That Pup (1949)
- Created by: William Hanna; Joseph Barbera
- Designed by: Spike: Harvey Eisenberg (1942–1953, 1980, 2002-present); Richard Bickenbach (1953–1957); Iwao Takamoto (1975); Jerry Eisenberg (1990–1993); Tyke: Harvey Eisenberg (1949-1953, 1980, 2002-present); Richard Bickenbach (1953–1957); Jerry Eisenberg (1990–1993)
- Voiced by: Spike: Billy Bletcher (1944–1949); Patrick McGeehan (1949, 1957); Jerry Mann (1950); Bob Shamrock (1951–1952); John Brown (1953); Stan Freberg (1954); Daws Butler (1955–1957); John Stephenson (1975); Don Messick (1975); Joe E. Ross (1975); Will Ryan (1975); Frank Welker (1980, 2005); Lou Scheimer (1980); Dick Gautier (1990–1993); Alan Marriott (2000); Maurice LaMarche (2002); Marc Silk (2002); Jeff Bergman (2004); John DiMaggio (2005); Michael Donovan (2006–2008); Phil LaMarr (2010–2013); Rick Zieff (2014–present); Spike Brandt (2015–present); Bobby Cannavale (2021); Scott Innes (commercials); Tyke: William Hanna (1949–1958); Frank Welker (1980–present); Patric Zimmerman (1990–1993); Alan Marriott (2000–2002); Spike Brandt (2012–2015)

In-universe information
- Species: Dogs (English Bulldogs)
- Gender: Male (both)
- Nationality: American

Spike Bulldog and Tyke Bulldog are American cartoon characters from the Tom and Jerry animated film series, created by William Hanna and Joseph Barbera. Spike (who goes by different names in a few shorts – Killer for four shorts, Butch for two shorts, and Bulldog for one) is portrayed as an English Bulldog, who is generally amiable and friendly, and a loving father to his son Tyke in several cartoons. However, Spike's character also has a very stern and fierce side for occasions, such as when he is defending his son Tyke.

Spike made his early appearance as an unnamed Bulldog in the 1942 Tom and Jerry cartoon Dog Trouble, and his first appearance and his first speaking role was in The Bodyguard (1944), where he was voiced by Billy Bletcher. Spike was voiced by Bletcher until 1949, from which point he was voiced by Patrick McGeehan, Jerry Mann, Bob Shamrock, John Brown, Stan Freberg, and Daws Butler, with a thick New Yorker accent similar to Jimmy Durante's.

Following Dog Trouble, Spike appeared solo as a guest in Tom and Jerry cartoons for several years, and his son Tyke was introduced in 1949 in Love That Pup.

Tyke is a sweet, happy, and innocent puppy who remains silent in most of the earlier cartoons. Spike and Tyke's characters, provide a model of father and son behavior, with Spike spending much of his free time taking Tyke on father-son outings, teaching him the facts of life for dogs and guarding him diligently when they are sleeping. In Tom and Jerry Kids, Tyke has a speaking role for the first time, aside from traditional dog noises he expressed in the prior films.

Spike’s relationships with Tom and Jerry have changed over time, but essentially, Spike has little affection for Tom Cat, who consistently disrupts his life, causes trouble, antagonizes Tyke, or does all of the above. The Truce Hurts (1948), Pet Peeve (1954) and Hic-Cup Pup (1954) are so far the only cartoons where Spike actually cares about and shows affection for Tom; these relationships often dissolve and usually end with them fighting. Tom does not usually antagonize Spike intentionally, but Spike often ends up in the middle of a Tom and Jerry chase, (as they are all seemingly living together) which ends up waking Spike up, ruining his new dog house, wrecking his and Tyke's picnic, and so on. Spike has a few weaknesses that Tom tries to capitalize upon: his possessiveness about his bone and his ticklishness.

Spike's fiercest behavior is reserved for anyone who interferes with Tyke, but also, Spike's generally well-intentioned brain is at times easily outwitted by Tom and/or Jerry. Jerry also arranges to get Tom in trouble with Spike, provoking a chase, and/or a pounding from the bulldog, and Spike will keep Tom's attention off Jerry for a while. Several stories also have Jerry taking advantage of Spike and Tyke's size and proximity, as he often tries to hide or sleep with or near Spike and Tyke for protection.

== Early appearances ==
In his early appearance, Dog Trouble, Spike as an unnamed Bulldog is the main antagonist, chasing and attacking both Tom and Jerry on sight, even trying to eat Jerry, which forced the two to work together to defeat him. However, in his second appearance The Bodyguard, after Jerry willingly saved him from being poached, he became Jerry's protector whenever needed. In all subsequent shorts, Spike becomes typecast as the stereotypical dumb brute who is always duped into becoming a shield for Jerry from Tom. It is only in two shorts where Jerry gets Spike out of a jam and the dog willingly protects him from Tom in well-earned gratitude (The Bodyguard and Fit to Be Tied). On most occasions, Jerry causes trouble for Tom by luring him near Spike and harming him to get him angry, and in some cartoons, when it's perfectly obvious that Tom is not responsible, as seen in The Invisible Mouse, Spike still blames Tom and hurts him instead of Jerry. Only on one occasion does Jerry fail to frame Tom, in Hic-Cup Pup, where Tom unintentionally cures Spike and Tyke's hiccups, and Spike shakes Tom's hand.

Spike, however, is not without a softer and sympathetic side: in the short Pet Peeve, after believing that Tom is willing to leave the house in Spike's favour, Spike feels sorry for him to the point that he offers to leave instead, which Spike does until he realizes that Tom is only using reverse psychology to trick him into leaving. In The Truce Hurts, Spike is portrayed as a very intelligent and equilibrated character when he convinces Tom and Jerry to stop the fighting among the three of them and sign a Peace Treaty, but their newfound friendship comes to an end when they argue over how to share a big steak, symbolised when Spike tears the truce contract to shreds and they go back to fighting again after Tom accidentally threw the steak into the sewer drain. From the 1944 cartoon The Bodyguard to 1948 cartoon Heavenly Puss, he was voiced by Billy Bletcher. His first name is Bulldog in Dog Trouble, His name also varies in some shorts: in Puttin' on the Dog, Solid Serenade and Cat Fishin' he is named "Killer", and in The Truce Hurts he signs his name "Butch" on the treaty peace paper. He is also a Devil Dog in Heavenly Puss.

== Spike's later years and Tyke's debut ==
In Tom's later attempts to catch Jerry, he has to deal with Spike for bothering his son. In 1949's Love That Pup, Spike was given a puppy son, Tyke, who became another popular supporting character in the Tom and Jerry cartoons. His voice was taken over by Daws Butler, who styled Spike's voice after Jimmy Durante taking after his 1940s radio series with Garry Moore. He is named Spike from then on and is not changed again. When Tyke is introduced, Spike is given a softer approach (mainly towards his son) and is kinder and less aggressive, but is still portrayed as a dumb animal on more than one occasion. Spike's love and affection towards Tyke becomes Jerry's newest weapon against Tom, as his strategy goes from luring Tom towards Spike to inflicting harm on Tyke, and even when it is perfectly obvious that Jerry is responsible and not Tom, as seen in Love That Pup. Spike fails to notice this and still blames Tom (although this can be partially due to Spike's dislike of Tom).

A short-lived Spike and Tyke cartoon series was produced by MGM in 1957; only two entries were completed. Within a year, the MGM cartoon studio had shut down, and Hanna and Barbera took Spike and Tyke and retooled them to create one of the first television successes for Hanna-Barbera Productions, Augie Doggie and Doggie Daddy.

Spike and Tyke would not appear in new Tom and Jerry cartoons, until the 1970s The Tom and Jerry Show, the 1980s The Tom and Jerry Comedy Show, and 1990s Tom & Jerry Kids (in which Tom and Jerry themselves were made younger, but Spike and Tyke remained the same ages, and appeared both with Tom and Jerry, and in new episodes of their own with a girlfriend for Tyke). He had also made a cameo in the 1967 MGM Animation/Visual Arts production Matinee Mouse, which reused footage from Love that Pup and The Truce Hurts, and added some new animation in the final punchline. Spike would continue to appear in Tom and Jerry full-length features released in the early 2000s and finally, Tom and Jerry Tales.

Spike and his son Tyke also appear as regulars in the recent reboot series.

Spike made an appearance in the 2021 film, Tom & Jerry under the ownership of Ben. He was voiced by Bobby Cannavale.

== Comics appearances ==
Spike and Tyke made frequent appearances in the second Tom and Jerry daily newspaper strip, which was distributed by Editors Press Service from about 1974 until 1998. Although the strip was produced in the US, it was published exclusively in foreign newspapers.

Spike and Tyke starred in a long series of comic book stories in Dell Publishing's Tom and Jerry Comics, starting with #79 (Feb 1951) until #215 (May 1963). They also appeared in three issues of Dell's Four Color series between 1953 and 1955, (#499, 577, and 638). Their own title thusly started at #4. "M.G.M.'s Spike and Tyke" ran until issue #24, and then there was a final Four Color issue, #1266. Unlike their portrayal in the cartoons, both characters spoke in the comic book stories.

== Featured cartoons ==
=== Hanna-Barbera era ===
- Dog Trouble (1942) (as an Unnamed Bulldog)
- The Bodyguard (1944)
- Puttin' on the Dog (1944)
- Quiet Please! (1945)
- Solid Serenade (1946)
- Cat Fishin' (1947)
- The Invisible Mouse (1947)
- The Truce Hurts (1948)
- Love That Pup (first appearance of Tyke) (1949)
- The Framed Cat (1950)
- Slicked-up Pup (1951)
- Cat Napping (1951)
- Fit to Be Tied (1952)
- The Dog House (1952)
- That's My Pup! (1953)
- Two Little Indians (1953)
- Life with Tom (1953)
- Hic-cup Pup (1954)
- Pet Peeve (1954)
- Pup on a Picnic (1955)
- Smarty Cat (1955)
- Barbecue Brawl (1956)
- Give and Tyke (1957, first "Spike and Tyke" short)
- Tops with Pops (remake of Love That Pup) (1957)
- Scat Cats (1957, last "Spike and Tyke" short)
- Tom's Photo Finish (1957)
- Tot Watchers (cameo appearance) (1958)
- Matinee Mouse (also archive footage) (1966) (compilation film)

=== Turner Entertainment/Warner Bros. Animation ===
- The Mansion Cat (cameo appearance; possible deleted scene) (2001)
- The Karate Guard (2005)

=== Tex Avery/Hanna-Barbera ===
- War Dogs (cameo appearance) (1943)
- The Three Little Pups (cameo appearance) (1953)

=== The Tom and Jerry Show (1975) ===
- The Ski Bunny
- No Bones About It
- Beach Bully
- Cosmic Cat and Meteor Mouse
- The Kitten Sitters
- Planet Pest
- Watch Out, Watch Dog
- Planet of the Dogs
- Triple Trouble
- Cruise Kitty

=== The Tom and Jerry Comedy Show ===
- Droopy's Restless Night
- The Puppy Sitter
- Spike's Birthday
- School for Cats
- Stage Struck
- Pie in the Sky
- Mouse Over Miami
- A Day at the Bakery
- No Museum Peace
- Get Along, Little Jerry

=== Tom & Jerry Kids ===
- Dog Daze Afternoon
- Puss n' Pups
- Super Duper Spike
- Hoodwinked Cat
- Crash Condor
- My Pet
- Chumpy Chums
- Tyke on a Hike
- Boomer Beaver
- Tyke on a Bike
- Here's Sand in Your Face
- Fish That Shoulda Got Away
- Love Me, Love My Zebra
- Barbecue Bust-Up
- Pink Powder-Puff Racer
- Down in the Dumps

=== Tom and Jerry Tales ===
- Feeding Time
- Joy Riding Jokers
- Way Off Broadway
- Tomcat Jetpack
- Doggone Hill Hog
- Spaced Out Cat
- Beach Bully Bingo
- Destruction Junction
- Jackhammered Cat
- Beefcake Tom
- Spook House Mouse (appeared as a ghost dog)
- More Powers to You (appeared as a disguised antagonist)
- Catch Me Though You Can't
- Power Tom (appeared in Tom's dream)
- Zent Out of Shape (His face/head was on Godzilla)
- I Dream of Meanie (appeared as a genie dog)
- Which Witch (two Spikes appear as witches respectively)
- The Cat Whisperer with Casper Lombardo
- Bend It Like Thomas
- Game Set Match (only appearance with Tyke)
- The Deceleration of Independence
- 24 Karat Kat
- DJ Jerry
- Game of Mouse & Cat
- Catfish Follies (appeared as a dogfish)

=== Direct-to-video films ===
- Tom and Jerry: The Magic Ring
- Tom and Jerry: Blast Off to Mars (Spike only)
- Tom and Jerry: The Fast and the Furry (Spike only)
- Tom and Jerry: Shiver Me Whiskers (Spike only)
- Tom and Jerry Meet Sherlock Holmes
- Tom and Jerry: Robin Hood and His Merry Mouse
- Tom and Jerry's Giant Adventure
- Tom and Jerry: Spy Quest
- Tom and Jerry: Back to Oz
- Tom and Jerry: Willy Wonka and the Chocolate Factory (Spike's a main character while Tyke makes a cameo)

== Voice actors ==
Spike

- Billy Bletcher: (1944-1948)
- Earl Keen: (1946) vocal effects in Solid Serenade
- William Hanna: (1947-1948, 1950, 1954–1955) yawning in Cat Fishin' (1947) and Smarty Cat (1955), screaming in The Truce Hurts (1948) and The Framed Cat (1950), hiccuping in Hic-cup Pup (1954), screaming in The Tom and Jerry Show episode "You Are What You Eat"
- Patrick McGeehan: (1949, 1957) Love That Pup (1949), Tops with Pops (1957)
- Jerry Mann: (1950) The Framed Cat (1950)
- Bob Shamrock: (1951-1952) Slicked-up Pup (1951), Fit to Be Tied (1952), The Dog House (1952)
- John Brown: (1953) That's My Pup! (1953)
- Fred Karbo: (1953) laughing in Life with Tom (1953)
- Stan Freberg: (1954) Hic-cup Pup (1954)
- Daws Butler: (1955–1957) Pup on a Picnic (1955), Barbecue Brawl (1956), Give and Tyke (1957), Scat Cats (1957), Tom's Photo Finish (1957)
- Mel Blanc: (1955) sneezing in Pup on a Picnic (1955) (reused from the 1942 MGM cartoon, The Hungry Wolf)
- John Stephenson: The Tom and Jerry Show (1975)
- Don Messick: The Tom and Jerry Show (1975)
- Joe E. Ross: The Tom and Jerry Show (1975)
- Frank Welker: The Tom and Jerry Comedy Show, Tom and Jerry: Blast Off to Mars
- Lou Scheimer: The Tom and Jerry Comedy Show
- Dick Gautier: Tom & Jerry Kids
- Alan Marriott: Tom and Jerry in Fists of Furry
- Maurice LaMarche: Tom and Jerry: The Magic Ring
- Marc Silk: Tom and Jerry in War of the Whiskers
- Jeff Bergman: Boomerang UK bumper
- John DiMaggio: Tom and Jerry: The Fast and the Furry
- Michael Donovan: Tom and Jerry Tales
- Phil LaMarr: Tom and Jerry Meet Sherlock Holmes, Tom and Jerry: Robin Hood and His Merry Mouse and Tom and Jerry's Giant Adventure
- Rick Zieff: The Tom and Jerry Show, Tom and Jerry in New York and Tom and Jerry Time
- Spike Brandt: Tom and Jerry: Spy Quest, Tom and Jerry: Back to Oz, Tom and Jerry: Willy Wonka and the Chocolate Factory
- Bobby Cannavale (2021): Tom and Jerry

Tyke

- William Hanna: possibly (1949–1958)
- Bob Shamrock: (1951) Slicked-up Pup (1951)
- Mel Blanc: (1951) sneezing in Slicked-up Pup (1951) (reused from the 1942 MGM cartoon, The Hungry Wolf)
- Fred Karbo: (1953) laughing in Life with Tom (1953)
- Frank Welker: The Tom and Jerry Comedy Show, Tom and Jerry: The Magic Ring, The Tom and Jerry Show (2014), Tom and Jerry in New York
- Patric Zimmerman: Tom & Jerry Kids
- Alan Marriott: Tom and Jerry in Fists of Furry, Tom and Jerry in War of the Whiskers
- Spike Brandt: Tom and Jerry: Robin Hood and His Merry Mouse, Tom and Jerry's Giant Adventure, Tom and Jerry: Spy Quest
