= Sander Schwartz =

American producer of television animation (born 1954)

Sander Schwartz (born January 7, 1954) is an American Daytime Emmy award-winning producer of television animation. He was President of Warner Bros. Animation between 2001 and 2007, followed by President, International Productions of Sony Pictures Television between 2007 and 2009, and was President of FremantleMedia's Kids and Family Entertainment Division from 2009 through 2013. From 2013 to 2015 he was CEO of IPSP Global Financial Services LLC, the American arm of DengiOnline, the largest online electronics payments platform in Russia and the C.I.S., specializing in the distribution of video games for and micro-transactions within gaming for all platforms. In 2013, Sander founded Sandman Television and Film Inc., a boutique production company and media advisory firm.

== Biography ==
Sander Schwartz was born on January 7, 1954 in Cleveland, Ohio, United States. After graduating from high school, Schwartz studied Government and Economics at Ohio University, followed by law at Northwestern University Chicago. He started his career in entertainment and media as Assistant Executive Secretary of AFTRA. In 1982, Schwartz moved to New York to work for CBS Entertainment, where he developed an interest in children's television programs. In the mid-1980s, Schwartz relocated to California, where he worked for CBS, TMS Entertainment (based in Tokyo, Japan), Walt Disney Television, and Columbia Pictures Television as Executive Vice President of Children's Programming. He was subsequently appointed President of Family Entertainment for Sony Pictures Entertainment for the period 1999–2001. Subsequently, he was appointed President of Warner Bros. Animation in 2001, but in 2007, Schwartz resigned to return to Sony Pictures. In 2009, Schwartz joined FremantleMedia as Executive Vice President of the newly created Kids and Family Entertainment division, and moved into the role of President in the same division in 2010.

== Filmography ==
=== Movies ===
- Scooby-Doo! and the Legend of the Vampire (2003)
- Batman: Mystery of the Batwoman (2003)
- Kangaroo Jack: G'Day U.S.A.! (2004)
- Tom and Jerry: Blast Off to Mars (2005)
- Scooby-Doo! in Where's My Mummy? (2005)
- Tom and Jerry: The Fast and the Furry (2005)
- The Karate Guard (2005)
- Scooby-Doo! Pirates Ahoy! (2006)
- Superman: Brainiac Attacks (2006)
- Tom and Jerry: Shiver Me Whiskers (2006)
- Teen Titans: Trouble in Tokyo (2006)
- Bah, Humduck! A Looney Tunes Christmas (2006)
- Chill Out, Scooby-Doo! (2007)
- Superman: Doomsday (2007)
- Tom and Jerry: A Nutcracker Tale (2007)
- Justice League: The New Frontier (2008)
- Batman: Gotham Knight (2008)
- Wonder Woman (2009)
- My Babysitter's a Vampire (2011)
- Wizards vs Aliens (2012)
- Alien Xmas (2020)

=== Television series ===
- Visionaries: Knights of the Magical Light (1987)
- Static Shock (2000–2004)
- Justice League (2001–2004)
- ¡Mucha Lucha! (2002–2005)
- Baby Looney Tunes (2002–2005)
- What's New, Scooby-Doo? (2002–2005)
- Ozzy & Drix (2002–2004)
- Teen Titans (2003–2006)
- Duck Dodgers (2003–2005)
- Xiaolin Showdown (2003–2006)
- Justice League Unlimited (2004–2006)
- The Batman (2004–2008)
- Krypto the Superdog (2005–2006)
- Firehouse Tales (2005–2006)
- Loonatics Unleashed (2005–2007)
- Coconut Fred's Fruit Salad Island! (2005–2006)
- Johnny Test (2005–2006)
- Legion of Super Heroes (2006–2008)
- Tom and Jerry Tales (2006–2008)
- Shaggy & Scooby-Doo Get a Clue! (2006–2008)
- The Looney Tunes Show (2011–2014) (co-exec.)
- My Babysitter's a Vampire (2010–2012)
- Really Me (2011–2012)
- Bindi's Bootcamp (2011–2013)
- Tree Fu Tom (2012–2016)
- Strange Hill High (2013–2014)
- Alien Dawn (2010–2012)
- Max Steel (2013–2015)
- Grojband (2013–2014)
- Ella the Elephant (2013–2014)
- Skylanders Academy (2016–2017)
- Subway Surfers: The Series (2018)
