= Michael Tavera =

- Also known as: Mike Tavera
- Born: Michael Anthony Tavera; Los Angeles, California, U.S.
- Genres: Film score, video game music

Michael Anthony Tavera is an American composer best known for his animation scores. He has also worked on countless television series, live-action films, and direct-to-video sequels. He composed at the London Symphony Orchestra.

== Biography ==
Tavera grew up in Los Angeles. He is most notable for composing music for shows such as ¡Mucha Lucha!, Star Wars Resistance, and Guardians of the Galaxy.

== Filmography ==
=== Film ===
Year	Film	Notes
1988	Lucky Stiff	
1992	Frozen Assets	
1993	Bitter Harvest	
1994	The Land Before Time II: The Great Valley Adventure	with James Horner
1995	Mr. Payback: An Interactive Movie	
1995	The Chili Con Carne Club	
1995	The Land Before Time III: The Time of the Great Giving	with James Horner
1995	Jingle Bell Rock	
1996	No One Would Tell	
1996	The Land Before Time IV: Journey Through the Mists	with James Horner
1997	Dying to Belong	
1997	Honey, We Shrunk Ourselves	
1997	Two Came Back	
1997	RocketMan	
1997	Culture	
1997	Mr. Magoo	
1997	The Land Before Time V: The Mysterious Island	with James Horner
1997	Holiday in Your Heart	
1998	Girl	
1998	Forever Love	
1998	An American Tail: The Treasure of Manhattan Island	with James Horner
1998	The Land Before Time VI: The Secret of Saurus Rock	with James Horner
1999	Special Delivery	
1999	Silent Predators	
1999	Excellent Cadavers	
1999	CinderElmo	
2000	Quints	
2000	Drowning Mona	
2000	An American Tail: The Mystery of the Night Monster	with James Horner
2000	The Land Before Time VII: The Stone of Cold Fire	with James Horner
2001	Mickey's Magical Christmas: Snowed in at the House of Mouse	
2001	The Land Before Time VIII: The Big Freeze	with James Horner
2002	Cinderella II: Dreams Come True	
2002	Mickey's House of Villains	with Randy Petersen
2002	The Land Before Time IX: Journey to Big Water	with James Horner
2003	Charlotte's Web 2: Wilbur's Great Adventure	
2003	Stitch! The Movie	Themes by Alan Silvestri
2003	The Land Before Time X: The Great Longneck Migration	
2005	The Origin of Stitch	
2005	¡Mucha Lucha!: The Return of El Maléfico	
2005	The Fix	
2005	The Land Before Time XI: Invasion of the Tinysauruses	with James Horner
2006	On Native Soil	
2006	The Land Before Time XII: The Great Day of the Flyers	
2007	The Land Before Time XIII: The Wisdom of Friends	
2008	Waiting in Beijing	
2009	The Girl in the Window	
2009	The Last Lovecraft: Relic of Cthulhu	
2009	Lionelville: Destination Adventure	
2010	U/Gen-10	
2010	Tom and Jerry Meet Sherlock Holmes	
2011	Bounty Killer	
2011	Slightly Single in L.A.	
2011	Quest for Zhu	
2011	Tom and Jerry and the Wizard of Oz	
2012	Soldiers of Fortune	with Joseph LoDuca
2012	Tom and Jerry: Robin Hood and His Merry Mouse	
2013	Dog It Down	
2013	Slightly Single in L.A.	
2013	Tom and Jerry's Giant Adventure	
2014	Tom and Jerry: The Lost Dragon	
2015	Tom and Jerry: Spy Quest	
2016	The Land Before Time XIV: Journey of the Brave	
2016	Tom and Jerry: Back to Oz	
2017	Tom and Jerry: Willy Wonka and the Chocolate Factory	with Walter Scharf

=== Television ===
Year	Series	Notes
1983	Star Search	
1988	The Completely Mental Misadventures of Ed Grimley	
1988–1990	Fantastic Max	
1989	Wowzer	Music Arranger, with Bob Mitchoff
1990	Midnight Patrol: Adventures in the Dream Zone	
1990	The Adventures of Super Mario Bros. 3	with Evan Roberts, Joellyn Cooperman, and Paige Ashley
1990	The New Adventures of He-Man	Music Arranger, with Steve Marston
1990–1991	Captain N: The Game Master	Also worked on orchestration and music arrangement for Season 1 in 1989
1990–1991	The Adventures of Don Coyote and Sancho Panda	
1990–1991	Wake, Rattle, and Roll	
1991	Good Sports	
1991	Swamp Thing: The Series	
1991	Super Mario World	with Monroe Michaels
1991	Where's Waldo	
1991	Charlie Hoover	Episode 1.5
1991	Sightings	
1991–1992	Back to the Future: The Animated Series	Theme by Alan Silvestri
1992	Shelley Duvall's Bedtime Stories	
1993	Sonic the Hedgehog	Season 1 and main theme song
1993–1995	Exosquad	
1993–1997	Hurricanes	Co-produced With Reed Robbins and Mark Simon
1994	Beethoven: The Animated Series	
1995	Melrose Place	Episode 3.20: Boxing Sydney
1995	What-a-Mess	
1996–1998	The Spooktacular New Adventures of Casper	
1996	Richie Rich	
1998	Toonsylvania	
1998–1999	Hyperion Bay	
1999–2002	Beyond Chance	
1999	Invader Zim	Pilot
2000	HBO First Look	Episode: What Lies Beneath: Constructing the Perfect Thriller
2001–2003	House of Mouse	
2001–2003	Butt-Ugly Martians	
2001	Time Squad	
2002	The Cartoon Cartoon Show	Episode: "Jeffrey Cat: Claw and Order"
2002–2005	¡Mucha Lucha!	Season 1 and 2
2003–2007	Jakers! The Adventures of Piggley Winks	
2003–2006	Lilo & Stitch: The Series	
2004–2006	Pet Alien	
2006–2008	The Emperor's New School	
2006–2009	Yin Yang Yo!	
2007–2008	Digimon Data Squad	
2008	Ben & Izzy	
2008	Random! Cartoons	Episodes: The Finster Finster Show; Ivan the Unbearable
2008–2010	The Secret Saturdays	
2009	So Random!	Writer: Socks with Sandals
2010–2013	Planet Sheen	
2012–2014	Monsuno	
2013	Max Steel	
2013–2015	The Awesomes	
2015–2019	Guardians of the Galaxy	
2016–2024	Kulipari	
2018–2020	Star Wars Resistance	Original Star Wars themes and score by John Williams

== Video games ==
=== Games ===
Year	Game	Notes
1993	Lil' Howie's Fun House: Tuneland	
1995	Lil' Howie's Fun House: The Great Word Adventure	songs: Opening Song; Goin' to the Attic; You're Gonna Be Scared; You're Smart
1996	Lil' Howie's Fun House: The Great Math Adventure	songs: Opening Song; You're Smart
1996	Lil' Howie's Fun House: The Great Reading Adventure	songs: Opening Song; You're Smart
2002	Disney's Stitch: Experiment 626	
