= Spike Brandt and Tony Cervone =

American television writing, animation and production team

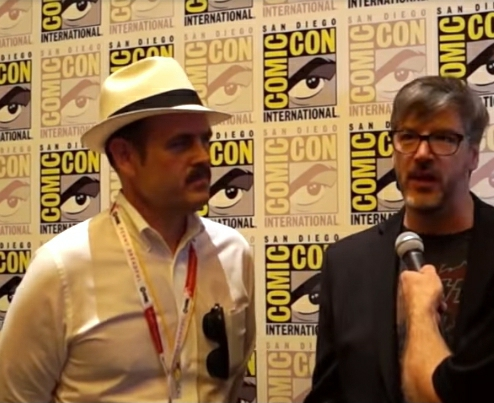
- Brandt and Cervone in 2015
- Born: Christopher John Brandt December 24, 1961 (age 64) Milwaukee, Wisconsin, U.S.; Anthony Joseph Cervone November 15, 1966 (age 59) Melrose Park, Illinois, U.S.
- Occupations: Animators, voice actors
- Years active: 1991–present
- Employer: Warner Bros. Animation
- Spouse: Allison Abbate (m. 2012) (Cervone)

Christopher John "Spike" Brandt and Anthony Joseph "Tony" Cervone are American animators, writers, and voice actors working for Warner Bros. Animation and formerly Nickelodeon Animation Studios. Brandt was born on December 24, 1961, in Milwaukee, Wisconsin, and Cervone was born on November 15, 1966, in Melrose Park, Illinois.

The duo is best known for doing various projects about Scooby-Doo, The Flintstones, Tom and Jerry, and Looney Tunes. They had also worked on Animaniacs, Duck Dodgers, The Looney Tunes Show, and various other projects. Brandt had also voiced Tom Cat, Jerry Mouse and Spike Bulldog in various Tom and Jerry direct-to-DVD movies.

== Early life ==
Brandt was born on December 24, 1961, in Milwaukee, Wisconsin as Christopher John Brandt while Cervone was born on November 15, 1966, in Melrose Park, Illinois as Anthony Joseph Cervone.

== Career ==
=== Beginnings ===
Both Brandt and Cervone started their careers in 1991. Brandt got his start in animation at StarToons, a prominent animation studio located in Chicago. Jon McClenahan, the founder of StarToons, had worked previously for studios such as Hanna-Barbera. McClenahan hired Brandt because the studio needed some help animating episodes of Tiny Toon Adventures for Warner Bros.

Brandt stayed for three years at StarToons, where he also worked on Warner Bros. shows like Taz-Mania and Animaniacs. It was during their shared tenure at StarToons that Brandt met fellow animator Tony Cervone, with them both serving as animation directors on Scooby-Doo! in Arabian Nights.

=== Projects with Warner Bros. ===
The duo would go on to write, direct, and produce several projects for Warner Bros. starting in 1994, both together and solo. The Brandt-Cervone formula has proven to consist of revamping classic cartoon characters and series for contemporary audiences without compromising their original appeal.

They wrote, directed, and produced all episodes on Duck Dodgers (a re-imagining of a classic Daffy Duck segment) which aired from 2003 to 2005. Likewise, they were the developers, directors, and supervising producers of both Scooby-Doo! Mystery Incorporated and The Looney Tunes Show. They developed the two shows alongside Mitch Watson in the former, and Sam Register in the latter.

Brandt and Cervone would direct several Tom and Jerry direct-to-video films such as Tom and Jerry: A Nutcracker Tale and Tom and Jerry: Robin Hood and His Merry Mouse, also with other films having crossovers with the duo such as Willy Wonka and the Chocolate Factory and Sherlock Holmes. Brandt would also co-direct the 2005 short The Karate Guard alongside Tom and Jerry co-creator, Joseph Barbera. It was the last Tom and Jerry cartoon with Barbera’s involvement before his death on December 18, 2006, one year after the short aired in theatres. Brandt would provide the voices of Spike the Bulldog and also voiced the titular title characters, despite being uncredited for the latter roles.

The duo also produced and directed several Scooby-Doo projects, including the straight-to-video films Scooby-Doo! Abracadabra-Doo and Scooby-Doo! and Kiss: Rock and Roll Mystery. In 2018, Brandt directed the animation for an episode of Supernatural, which was a crossover with the characters of Scooby-Doo titled Scoobynatural. Cervone also directed several State Farm commercials featuring the Scooby-Doo characters.

Cervone served as the animation director for the 1996 film, Space Jam while Brandt became animation director on its sequel, Space Jam: A New Legacy in 2021. Cervone went on to make his feature directorial debut with Scoob!, a film based on the Scooby-Doo franchise and was the first film of an Hanna-Barbera cinematic universe. He also provided the voice of a ghost and Mr. Rigby. It was released in 2020 and received mixed reviews. In 2021, Cervone announced that a sequel to the film was in development. The film, Scoob! Holiday Haunt, was set for release in December 2022 but was cancelled by Warner Bros. Discovery citing cost-cutting measures and a refocus on theatrical films rather than creating projects for streaming. Despite it being cancelled, it was eventually finished. Cervone also served as a consultant for Tom & Jerry.

== Personal life ==
Cervone married film producer Allison Abbate in 2012.

== Filmography ==
=== Directors ===
- 1993: Animaniacs – 3 episodes (Spike Brandt)
- 1994: Scooby-Doo! in Arabian Nights (Animation Director)
- 1996: Space Jam (animation director) (Tony Cervone)
- 2000: Little Go Beep (Spike Brandt) – Short
- 2002: Baby Blues (Tony Cervone) – 1 episode
- 2003–2005: Duck Dodgers – All episodes, Supervising Directors
- 2004: Daffy Duck for President – Short
- 2005: The Karate Guard (Spike Brandt, with Joseph Barbera) – Short
- 2007: Tom and Jerry: A Nutcracker Tale – Film
- 2007–2008: Tom and Jerry Tales – 4 episodes
- 2008–2009: Back at the Barnyard – 4 episodes
- 2010: Scooby-Doo! Abracadabra-Doo – Film
- 2010: Tom and Jerry Meet Sherlock Holmes (Spike Brandt; with Jeff Siergey) – Film
- 2011–2014: The Looney Tunes Show – 12 episodes
- 2011: Tom and Jerry and the Wizard of Oz – Film
- 2012: Tom and Jerry: Robin Hood and His Merry Mouse – Film
- 2013: Tom and Jerry's Giant Adventure – Film
- 2013: State Farm Scooby-Doo Commercials – 3 commercials (Tony Cervone)
- 2014: Tom and Jerry: The Lost Dragon – Film
- 2015: The Flintstones & WWE: Stone Age SmackDown! – Film
- 2015: Tom and Jerry: Spy Quest – Film
- 2015: Scooby-Doo! and Kiss: Rock and Roll Mystery – Film
- 2016: Tom and Jerry: Back to Oz – Film
- 2017: Tom and Jerry: Willy Wonka and the Chocolate Factory (Spike Brandt) – Film
- 2018: Supernatural (Spike Brandt) – 1 episode, Animation Director
- 2020: Scoob! (Tony Cervone) – Film
- 2021: Space Jam: A New Legacy (animation director) (Spike Brandt)
- 2021: Legends of Tomorrow (Tony Cervone) - 1 episode, animation supervisor

=== Writers ===
- 1995: The Cartoon Cartoon Show
- 2003–2005: Duck Dodgers – 25 episodes
- 2007: Tom and Jerry: A Nutcracker Tale – Film (screenplay only) (Spike Brandt)
- 2007–2008: Tom and Jerry Tales – 4 episodes (12 segments)

=== Producers ===
- 2000: Little Go Beep – Producer (Spike Brandt)
- 2003–2005: Duck Dodgers – Supervising Producers
- 2004: Daffy Duck for President – Producers
- 2005: The Karate Guard – Producers (with Joseph Barbera, Sam Register and Sander Schwartz)
- 2007: Tom and Jerry: A Nutcracker Tale – Producers
- 2007: Wacky Races Forever – Supervising Producers
- 2010: Scooby-Doo! Abracadabra-Doo – Supervising Producers
- 2010: Tom and Jerry Meet Sherlock Holmes – Producers (with Sam Register)
- 2010–2013: Scooby-Doo! Mystery Incorporated – Supervising Producers
- 2010: Scooby-Doo! Camp Scare – Producers
- 2011: Scooby-Doo! Legend of the Phantosaur – Producers
- 2011–2014: The Looney Tunes Show – Supervising Producers
- 2011: I Tawt I Taw a Puddy Tat – Producers (with Greg Lyons)
- 2012: Daffy's Rhapsody – Producers (with Greg Lyons)
- 2012: Scooby-Doo! Music of the Vampire – Producers
- 2012: Tom and Jerry: Robin Hood and His Merry Mouse – Producers
- 2012: Big Top Scooby-Doo! – Producers
- 2013: Tom and Jerry's Giant Adventure – Producers (with Sam Register)
- 2014: Tom and Jerry: The Lost Dragon – Producers
- 2015: The Flintstones & WWE: Stone Age SmackDown! – Producers (with Michael J. Luisi)
- 2015: Tom and Jerry: Spy Quest – Producers
- 2015: Scooby-Doo! and Kiss: Rock and Roll Mystery – Producers
- 2016: Tom and Jerry: Back to Oz – Producers (with Sam Register)
- 2017: Tom and Jerry: Willy Wonka and the Chocolate Factory – Producers (with Sam Register)
- 2018: Supernatural (1 episode) – Animation Producer (Spike Brandt)
- 2021: Scooby-Doo! The Sword and the Scoob – Producer (Spike Brandt)

=== Supervising producers ===
- 2003–2005: Duck Dodgers
- 2007: Wacky Races Forever
- 2010–2013: Scooby-Doo! Mystery Incorporated
- 2011–2014: The Looney Tunes Show

=== Supervising directors ===
- 2003–2005: Duck Dodgers

=== Voice actors ===
- 2005: The Karate Guard (Brandt voiced Tom, and Cervone voiced Butch)
- 2007: Tom and Jerry: A Nutcracker Tale (Brandt voiced Tom and Jerry)
- 2010: Tom and Jerry Meet Sherlock Holmes (Brandt voiced Tom and Jerry)
- 2010–2013: Scooby-Doo! Mystery Incorporated (Cervone voiced Gary in 6 episodes and French nerd in 1 episode)
- 2011: Tom and Jerry and the Wizard of Oz (Brandt voiced Tom and Jerry)
- 2012: Tom and Jerry: Robin Hood and His Merry Mouse (Brandt voiced Tom, Jerry and Tyke)
- 2013: Tom and Jerry's Giant Adventure (Brandt voiced Tom, Jerry and Tyke)
- 2014: Tom and Jerry: The Lost Dragon (Brandt voiced Tom and Jerry)
- 2015: Tom and Jerry: Spy Quest (Brandt voiced Tom, Spike, Tyke and Bandit)
- 2015: Scooby-Doo! and Kiss: Rock and Roll Mystery (Cervone voiced Announcer only)
- 2016: Tom and Jerry: Back to Oz (Brandt voiced Tom, Jerry, and Spike)
- 2017: Tom and Jerry: Willy Wonka and the Chocolate Factory (Brandt voiced Tom, Jerry and Spike)
- 2020: Scoob! (Cervone voiced Ghost and Mr. Rigby)
- 2021: Scooby-Doo! The Sword and the Scoob (Brandt voiced Mr. HB)

=== Voice directors ===
- 2004: Daffy Duck for President – Short

=== Storyboard artists ===
- 2001: Cats & Dogs
- 2001: Shrek
- 2003–2005: Duck Dodgers
- 2008–2009: Back at the Barnyard
- 2008–2009: Curious George (Spike Brandt)
- 2009: Fantastic Mr. Fox (Tony Cervone)
- 2010: Tom and Jerry Meet Sherlock Holmes
- 2011: Tom and Jerry and the Wizard of Oz
- 2012: Tom and Jerry: Robin Hood and His Merry Mouse
- 2013: Tom and Jerry's Giant Adventure
- 2014: Tom and Jerry: The Lost Dragon
- 2015: Tom and Jerry: Spy Quest
- 2016: Tom and Jerry: Back to Oz
- 2017: Tom and Jerry: Willy Wonka and the Chocolate Factory

=== Designers ===
- 2010: Fuse Presents Z100's Jingle Ball

=== Assistant directors ===
- 1995: Carrotblanca

=== Animation directors ===
- 1991: Dudley's Classroom Adventure
- 1996: Space Jam (just Tony Cervone)
- 2018: Supernatural (episode "Scoobynatural") (Spike Brandt)
- 2021: Space Jam: A New Legacy (Spike Brandt)

=== Lyrics ===
- 2007: Tom and Jerry: A Nutcracker Tale ("War Song for Children", "King of the Cats")
- 2010: Scooby-Doo! Mystery Incorporated ("Trap of Love") (Tony Cervone)
- 2015: Scooby-Doo! and Kiss: Rock and Roll Mystery ("Don't Touch My Ascot") (Tony Cervone)

=== Animators ===
- 1993: Animaniacs
- 1996: Space Jam (Spike Brandt)
- 2021: Space Jam: A New Legacy (Tony Cervone)
- 2025: The Day the Earth Blew Up: A Looney Tunes Movie (Spike Brandt)

=== Consultants ===
- 2021: Tom & Jerry (Tony Cervone)
