= Scooby-Doo! The Sword and the Scoob =

American animated direct-to-video comedy film

- DVD cover
- Directed by: Maxwell Atoms; Christina Sotta; Mel Zwyer
- Written by: Jeremy Adams; Maxwell Atoms
- Story by: Jeremy Adams
- Based on: Scooby-Doo by William Hanna, Joseph Barbera, Iwao Takamoto, Joe Ruby, & Ken Spears; The Sword in the Stone by T. H. White
- Produced by: Maxwell Atoms; Spike Brandt; Jim Krieg; Colin A.B.V. Lewis
- Starring: Frank Welker; Grey Griffin; Matthew Lillard; Kate Micucci; Jason Isaacs; Nick Frost
- Edited by: Robert Ehrenreich; Michael Mangan
- Music by: Robert J. Kral
- Production company: Warner Bros. Animation
- Distributed by: Warner Bros. Home Entertainment
- Release date: February 23, 2021
- Running time: 76 minutes
- Country: United States
- Language: English

Scooby-Doo! The Sword and the Scoob is a 2021 American direct-to-DVD animated comedy film produced by Warner Bros. Animation and distributed by Warner Bros. Home Entertainment. It is the thirty-fifth entry in the direct-to-video series of Scooby-Doo films and was released on February 23, 2021.

== Plot ==
The movie opens with a clip of an episode from Thundarr the Barbarian watched by an airplane passenger on his tablet computer. Hearing a noise from outside the airplane, he lifts the shade of his window, revealing a gremlin monster outside on the wing, damaging it with its claws. While the passengers watch in terror, Shaggy, Scooby-Doo, Fred, Daphne, and Velma manage to capture the monster with a parachute. Dropping off the monster for the police, the gang unmask him, revealing him to be a disgruntled passenger, Herman Ellinger, who had a grudge against airlines. The gang discovers DNA evidence revealing that Shaggy's ancestry came from a village in England.

Clips of the gang's trip to England play over the opening credits. The gang arrives at the village to learn more about Shaggy's ancestors, and they discover from the townspeople led by Mayor Saunders that Shaggy is descended from a legendary knight who thwarted an attempt by evil sorceress Morgan le Fay to steal the throne of Camelot from its ruler, King Arthur.

That night, Morgan le Fay attacks the gang and sends them back in time to the time of King Arthur. Realizing they're playing a part in the kingdom's legend, the gang decides to follow history until they can get back to the future. Their plan becomes complicated when Shaggy pulls out Excalibur from the stone and inadvertently challenges King Arthur's right to the throne. However, King Arthur explains that the right to the throne must be decided by a competition between knights. Shaggy chose Fred on his team, and King Arthur got the entire Order of the Round Table.

But before the competition can start, Morgan le Fay arrives and paralyzes Fred, leaving him unable to compete, forcing Daphne to take his place while Velma becomes an apprentice to the wizard Merlin to work out a way to go back to their time. Daphne single-handedly defeats the Knights of the Round Table, and Shaggy is declared the new king. Suddenly, Morgan le Fay returns and kidnaps Shaggy. The gang and Arthur follow them to Morgan le Fay's lair and discover that Shaggy has been tricked into signing his right to the throne in exchange for a banquet. Morgan transforms herself into a dragon to kill the gang, but they defeat her.

Afterward, Velma suddenly reveals that the gang's whole adventure was a staged experience by the townsfolk, and the gang was never sent back in time. When the townfolk feared Shaggy might claim their town as his birthright, they used a Camelot experience attraction with actors and special effects to make the gang believe they traveled back in time and to get Shaggy to sign over the deed to the town, and King Arthur reveals himself as Winston Pilkingstonshire, an actor who previously portrayed Thundarr the Barbarian.

When Shaggy explains that he has no interest in claiming the town, the town librarian Mrs. Wentworth, who posed as Morgan le Fay, steals the deed and takes the Mystery Machine to drive to a mailbox to take all the profits from the attraction for herself. Using Winston's lorry, disguised as an animatronic dragon, the gang and Winston stop her, and the police apprehend her.

As a thank-you to the gang, the town throws a party to celebrate. During the party, Velma learns from Mayor Saunders that the town didn't hire a Merlin actor, and the Merlin she encountered is revealed to be the real thing when he magically disappears at the end.

== Voice cast ==
- Frank Welker as Scooby-Doo, Fred Jones, Monster
- Grey Griffin as Daphne Blake, Morgan le Fay/Mrs. Wentworth, Dragon
- Matthew Lillard as Shaggy Rogers
- Kate Micucci as Velma Dinkley, Sandi
- Jason Isaacs as King Arthur Pendragon/Thundarr the Barbarian/Winston Pilkingstonshire
- Nick Frost as Merlin
- Greg Ellis as Herald, Herman Ellinger, British Passenger
- Ted Barton as Mayor Saunders, Sir Lancelot
- Spike Brandt as Mr. HB
- Trevor Devall as the Man Cat
- Stephen Stanton as Peanut Vendor
- Fred Tatasciore as the Black Knight
- Kari Wahlgren as the Female Peasant

== Production ==
Warner Bros. announced it in 2019 with an originally scheduled release in 2020. In December 2020, Syfy Wire exclusively announced the release date of February 23, 2021 with an accompanying trailer.

It was originally titled Scooby-Doo in King Arthur's Court, but it was retitled to Scooby-Doo! The Sword and the Scoob.

This was the first film to posthumously give special credit to original Scooby-Doo! creators Joe Ruby and Ken Spears, who both died months before the film's release.
