= Allen Helbig =

American artist

- Born: Walter Allen Helbig, Jr. December 3, 1964 (age 60); Canoga Park, California
- Education: Rowan University
- Known for: Illustration, Graphic Design

Allen Helbig (born December 3, 1964) is a contemporary American illustrator and graphic designer. During his career as an art director for Warner Bros., he illustrated and art directed many children's books and video games based on the classic short animated cartoons starring Bugs Bunny, Daffy Duck, and other Looney Tunes characters.

He art directed Chuck Jones' book Daffy Duck for President. It was Jones' last published book before his death in 2002.

== Sources ==
- Jones, Chuck (1997). Daffy Duck for President. Burbank, CA: Warner Bros. Worldwide Publishing. ISBN 1-890371-00-9.
- The Art of Allen Helbig
- Allen Helbig at IMDB
- Moby Games
