= Daffy Duck for President =

1997 picture book by Chuck Jones

- Book cover
- Editor: Charles Carney
- Author: Chuck Jones
- Illustrator: Chuck Jones
- Language: English
- Genre: Children's literature, Picture book
- Publisher: Warner Bros. Worldwide Publishing
- Publication date: 1997
- Publication place: United States
- Media type: Hardcover
- ISBN: 1-890371-00-9
- OCLC: 36485944

Daffy Duck for President is a children's book, published by Warner Bros. and the United States Postal Service in 1997 to coincide with the release of the first Bugs Bunny U.S. postage stamp. The book was written and illustrated by Chuck Jones, edited by Charles Carney, and art directed by Allen Helbig.

== Plot ==
Echoing the popular "Rabbit Season/Duck Season" scenes from the Bugs Bunny/Daffy Duck/Elmer Fudd shorts Rabbit Fire, Rabbit Seasoning and Duck! Rabbit, Duck!, the book tells how Daffy Duck, in an effort to outlaw Duck Season in favor of a perpetual Rabbit Season, attempts to become a politician so as to change the law to suit him. Through a civics lesson regarding the United States Constitution and with Bugs' help, Daffy learns that it is "We the People" who run the country, not any one man or duck, as he experiences the separation of powers concept of the United States Federal government.

From the book's dust jacket:

"Bugs guides Daffy through the 3 branches of American government - the foundation of freedom - in a style so breezy and comic that you'd never confuse it with a civics lesson. Or would you? In keeping with the explosive fun of the author's art, Daffy Duck for President is presented in its original sketch form. It's pure Chuck Jones - brash, witty, and reflective - in a bold flash of pencil, paper, and impulse."

== Film ==
In 2004, Warner Bros. released a four-minute animated short of the same name based on the book, coinciding with the Presidential election that year. The film was produced by Spike Brandt, Tony Cervone, and Linda M. Steiner, and was dedicated to Chuck Jones's memory (he died on February 22, 2002, two years prior the release of the cartoon). It was considered for a 2005 Academy Award for Best Animated Short. Joe Alaskey voiced Bugs and Daffy. It was also planned for a worldwide theatrical release, but these plans were cancelled after Looney Tunes: Back in Action performed poorly at the box office. However, it saw its eventual release as a bonus feature on the Looney Tunes Golden Collection: Volume 2 DVD set. The short is also available as a bonus feature on The Essential Daffy Duck DVD set.
