= Scooby-Doo and Scrappy-Doo =

Scooby-Doo and Scrappy-Doo can refer to several versions of Hanna-Barbera's Scooby-Doo Saturday morning cartoon series:

- Scooby-Doo and Scrappy-Doo (1979 TV series) (1979–1980), half-hour episodes featuring Scooby and Scrappy and the gang (Fred, Daphne, Velma and Shaggy)
- The Richie Rich/Scooby-Doo Show (1980–1981), half-hour episodes made up of three seven-minute cartoons featuring Scooby, Scrappy and Shaggy
- The Scooby & Scrappy-Doo/Puppy Hour (September 25 – December 18, 1982), half-hour episodes made up of three seven-minute cartoons featuring Scooby, Scrappy and Shaggy
  - Scooby-Doo and Scrappy-Doo (1980 TV series) (1980–1983), the Scooby shorts from the above two shows repackaged in their own right
- The New Scooby and Scrappy-Doo Show (September 10 – December 10, 1983), half-hour episodes made up of two eleven-minute cartoons featuring Scooby, Scrappy, Shaggy and the return of Daphne
- The New Scooby-Doo Mysteries (September 8 – December 1, 1984): half-hour episodes made up of two eleven-minute cartoons featuring Scooby, Scrappy, Shaggy and Daphne
