= The Karate Guard =

2005 animated short by Joseph Barbera, Spike Brandt

- Title card of The Karate Guard
- Directed by: Joseph Barbera; Spike Brandt
- Written by: Joseph Barbera; Iwao Takamoto
- Based on: Tom and Jerry by William Hanna; Joseph Barbera
- Produced by: Joseph Barbera; Sam Register; Sander Schwartz; Spike Brandt; Tony Cervone
- Starring: Spike Brandt; Keone Young; Tony Cervone
- Music by: Michael Giacchino
- Animation by: Spike Brandt; Dave Brewster; Tony Cervone; Michael Nickelson; Barry O'Donahue; Wendy Perdue; Jeff Siergey
- Color process: Technicolor
- Production companies: Warner Bros. Animation; Turner Entertainment Co.
- Distributed by: Warner Bros. Pictures (Los Angeles theatrical release, logo uncredited); Warner Bros. Domestic Television Distribution (TV airings)
- Release date: September 27, 2005
- Running time: 8 minutes
- Country: United States
- Language: English

The Karate Guard is a 2005 American animated cartoon short film, and the 163rd Tom and Jerry short. Directed by Joseph Barbera (Tom and Jerry co-creator and co-founder of Hanna-Barbera) and Spike Brandt, The Karate Guard was the last Tom and Jerry cartoon that Barbera worked on before his death in late 2006. It had a limited theatrical release in cinemas throughout Los Angeles on September 27, 2005 by Warner Bros. Pictures, and had its television premiere on Cartoon Network on January 27, 2006.

== Plot ==
Tom is taking a nap, but is suddenly awoken by Jerry. To check what the noise is coming from, Tom peeks through Jerry's mouse hole to find Jerry (dressed in a karate gi complete with a black belt) practicing karate with a punching bag resembling Tom. After Jerry finishes training, his spiritual mentor, who is a ghost-like figure, appears and asks him if he's ready to take on Tom, to which Jerry agrees. After Jerry walks out of his hole, he sees Tom at the end of a hallway and becomes afraid of him, until Tom starts to mock Jerry and laughs at the thought of Jerry defeating him. Jerry then decides to go and fight Tom, and Tom easily dispatches of him with a flyswatter. Jerry's spiritual mentor appears again and gives Jerry a gong to ring that summons a "Karate Guard" named Momo-sumo (played by Spike) to aid him whenever he needs help.

The remainder of the short deals with Tom's attempts to catch Jerry, unaware of Momo-sumo. As soon as Jerry rings the gong, Momo-sumo deals with Tom by tying him to a lawnmower and launching him into a garbage truck. Tom tries again, grabbing Jerry through an open kitchen window. Momo-sumo arrives and chops Tom's backside. Tom yelps quickly, puts Jerry back and falls to the ground. When Tom puts pillow-like earmuffs on Momo-sumo, he dings to show Jerry that his guard can't hear his gong. After Tom dings the gong close to Momo-sumo's ear, Momo-sumo wakens and shoots Tom into the air, where he lands on a falling gutter. Jerry does everything he can to anger Tom and Tom begins to chase him again. They run down the street into a toy store, where Jerry hides in a toy airplane. Jerry turns it on, pilots it, and scalps Tom's head and then shaves Tom's body with the propeller. Tom gets into a larger toy airplane and chases Jerry's plane in a dogfight-like chase, shredding Jerry's plane with his propeller. Jerry gongs for Momo-sumo and Tom slams into Momo-sumo's chest, causing Tom to disintegrate. Momo-sumo sweeps him up and throws him in a trash can. A panicked Tom calls an exterminator, Butch, along with three more cats to remove Momo-sumo from the household. They fire paintballs at Momo-sumo, who is thrown by the force into the swimming pool. Tom then breaks out laughing. However, Momo-sumo then grabs Tom and squashes him into a bowling ball which he uses to, literally, strike the cats out of the garden.

In the final scene, Jerry and Momo-sumo are watching television (which displays the battered exterminator cats) and eating popcorn, leading to Momo-sumo eating the whole popcorn and making Jerry ring the gong. However, instead of Momo-sumo, Tom arrives to serve more popcorn to Jerry and Momo-sumo and he kisses Momo-sumo's feet to apologize for his ill-treatment towards Jerry and beg for forgiveness. Jerry happily dives into the popcorn.

== Production ==
The Karate Guard was directed by Tom and Jerry co-creator Joseph Barbera and Spike Brandt. It is Barbera's first Tom and Jerry short since he and his business partner William Hanna directed Tot Watchers and left the cartoon series nearly 50 years prior. Tot Watchers was the last short before Hanna's death on March 22, 2001, and The Karate Guard was Barbera's last before his own death on December 18, 2006. This is not, however, Barbera's final Tom and Jerry project, as he would provide the story to the 2007 direct-to-DVD film Tom and Jerry: A Nutcracker Tale.

Barbera storyboarded The Karate Guard with Iwao Takamoto and also executive produced The Karate Guard with Sam Register and Sander Schwartz. The short was animated by Brandt, Dave Brewster, Tony Cervone, Michael Nickelson, Barry O'Donahue, Wendy Perdue, and Jeff Siergey. The music for the short was composed by Michael Giacchino; it was conducted by Tim Simonec and recorded at the Eastwood Scoring Stage on September 1, 2005.

== Home media ==
The Karate Guard is available as a bonus short on the DVDs Tom and Jerry Spotlight Collection Volume 3 and Tom and Jerry: The Deluxe Anniversary Collection.

== Voice cast ==
- Keone Young as Ancient Wise One
- Spike Brandt as Tom
- Tony Cervone as Butch

== See also ==
- List of works produced by Hanna-Barbera Productions
- Tom and Jerry filmography
