= Scooby-Doo! and Kiss: Rock and Roll Mystery =

2015 film by Spike Brandt and Tony Cervone

- DVD cover
- Directed by: Spike Brandt; Tony Cervone
- Screenplay by: Kevin Shinick
- Story by: Kevin Shinick; Jim Krieg
- Based on: Scooby-Doo by William Hanna, Joseph Barbera, Iwao Takamoto, Joe Ruby, & Ken Spears
- Produced by: Spike Brandt; Tony Cervone
- Starring: Frank Welker; Grey DeLisle; Mindy Cohn; Matthew Lillard; Gene Simmons; Paul Stanley; Eric Singer; Tommy Thayer
- Music by: Greg Collins; Jared Faber
- Production company: Warner Bros. Animation
- Distributed by: Warner Home Video
- Release dates: July 10, 2015 (Digital); July 21, 2015 (DVD and Blu-ray)
- Running time: 78 minutes
- Country: United States
- Language: English

Scooby-Doo! and Kiss: Rock and Roll Mystery is a 2015 direct-to-DVD animated crossover comedy mystery film, and the twenty-fifth entry in the direct-to-video series of Scooby-Doo films. It was released digitally on July 10, 2015, and was released on DVD and Blu-ray on July 21, 2015. The design of the film is inspired by Jack Kirby's comics. The film is the second official Scooby-Doo cartoon to feature the band Kiss after the Season 2 episode of What's New, Scooby-Doo?, "A Scooby-Doo Halloween".

This is the last Scooby-Doo! production featuring Mindy Cohn as Velma Dinkley before Kate Micucci took over that same year. It is also Pauley Perrette's last film appearance before her retirement from acting in 2020.

== Plot ==
Fred, Daphne, Velma, Shaggy and Scooby-Doo travel to an amusement park called Kiss World to see Kiss at their big Halloween concert and solve a mystery, mostly because Daphne has a crush on Starchild (Paul Stanley), much to Fred's annoyance. However, when the gang arrive, security chief and former government defense employee Delilah Domino refuse to let them in due to unexplained reasons, but they sneak in anyway, only to be caught by Delilah, who bans them from Kiss World. At that moment, Kiss arrives, and after the gang explains they just want to help, they tell Delilah the kids are free to stay, to which she reluctantly agrees, though she does not trust them just because they are amateur detectives and that she is watching them. The Demon (Gene Simmons) initially opposes the idea due to Scooby accidentally spraying a water gun on him when he came to Shaggy and Scooby for a surprise visit, but later relents. As the gang split up for clues, Shaggy and Scooby are chased by an entity until Kiss comes to pull them out of harm's way. They tell the gang the entity is called the Crimson Witch, and she has been terrorizing the park for a while, and they need her to disappear before the concert. Meanwhile, Delilah threatens to hold park owner Manny Goldman accountable before a local town council for property damage caused in Kiss World by the Crimson Witch if he doesn't close down the park for safety's sake.

A strange, perpetually barefoot fortune-teller named Chikara says the witch is from an alternate universe called Kissteria and plans to use the Black Diamond Kiss uses in their hit song "Detroit Rock City" to summon a monster called The Destroyer to conquer the Earth, which Velma finds hard to believe. To stop the Crimson Witch, the gang uses the diamond to lure the witch. However, the Crimson Witch chases them through a portal to Kissteria. She manages to steal the diamond and unleash The Destroyer, but the gang and Kiss arrive in a spaceship to stop the monster. The gang then returns to Earth, where they wake up believing the witch's gas caused them all to have a hallucination. They unmask the Crimson Witch as Delilah, who not only wished to sell the Black Diamond (needed for laser technology) to a competing defense company as revenge against her former employers, but to also prevent Mystery Inc. from entering Kiss World by disguising herself as a security guard in fear of them trying to expose her plot. Defeated, Delilah is carted off to jail for her crimes against the park and its staff.

Later, the Starchild kisses Daphne right in front of Fred. Daphne then kisses Fred on the cheek, much to his delight. The Demon gives Shaggy and Scooby a smile. Shaggy and Scooby then see Kiss fly away with the Black Diamond to present it to the Smithsonian Institution. Shaggy asks Scooby if they should tell Velma regarding the uneasiest case Mystery Inc. has ever solved in their entire lives. However, Scooby suggests they do not, simply stating: "Why rock her world?"

== Voice cast ==
Scooby-Doo

- Frank Welker as Fred Jones and Scooby-Doo
- Matthew Lillard as Shaggy Rogers
- Grey DeLisle as Daphne Blake
- Mindy Cohn as Velma Dinkley

Kiss

- Paul Stanley as The Starchild
- Gene Simmons as The Demon
- Tommy Thayer as The Spaceman
- Eric Singer as The Catman

Other

- Jennifer Carpenter as Chikara
- Garry Marshall as Manny Goldman
- Penny Marshall as The Elder
- Doc McGhee as Chip McGhoo
- Jason Mewes as Worker #1
- Pauley Perrette (in her last film appearance) as Delilah Domino, The Crimson Witch
- Rachel Ramras as Shandi Strutter
- Darius Rucker as The Destroyer
- Kevin Smith as Worker #2
- Tony Cervone as The Announcer

== Soundtrack ==
All of the songs featured in this film are made by Kiss, including the one new song made for the picture, "Don't Touch My Ascot".

No.	Title	Length
1.	"Don't Touch My Ascot"
2.	"Rock and Roll All Nite"
3.	"Love Gun" (instrumental)
4.	"Shout It Out Loud"
5.	"I Was Made for Lovin' You"
6.	"Detroit Rock City"
7.	"Modern Day Delilah"

== See also ==
- List of films set around Halloween
