= Tom and Jerry: Robin Hood and His Merry Mouse =

2012 film by Spike Brandt and Tony Cervone

- DVD cover
- Directed by: Spike Brandt; Tony Cervone
- Screenplay by: Earl Kress; Michael F. Ryan
- Story by: Earl Kress
- Based on: Tom and Jerry by: William Hanna; Joseph Barbera
- Produced by: Spike Brandt; Tony Cervone
- Starring: Jamie Bamber; Grey DeLisle; John Michael Higgins; Charles Shaughnessy
- Edited by: Kyle Stafford
- Music by: Michael Tavera
- Production companies: Warner Premiere; Warner Bros. Animation; Turner Entertainment Co.
- Distributed by: Warner Home Video
- Release date: October 2, 2012
- Running time: 58 minutes
- Country: United States
- Language: English

Tom and Jerry: Robin Hood and His Merry Mouse is a 2012 American animated direct-to-video action-adventure musical comedy film starring the seven-time Academy Award-winning cat-and-mouse duo Tom and Jerry as well as the historical and heroic outlaw Robin Hood. Produced by Warner Premiere, Warner Bros. Animation and Turner Entertainment Co., the film was released on DVD and Blu-ray on October 2, 2012.

The film was dedicated to the memory of actor, TV and comic writer and story and screenplay supervisor Earl Kress, who died on September 19, 2011, from liver cancer.

== Plot ==
Robin Hood, his companion Jerry, and the merry men attempt to ambush a tax money transport going through Sherwood Forest; the transport is a setup for a trap by the Sheriff of Nottingham, Prince John’s right-hand man who is accompanied by his henchcat Tom. However, thanks to Jerry’s warning, Robin has summoned his Merry Men to the scene, ambushing the ambushers and successfully seizing the gold transport. When John and the Sheriff discuss this latest fiasco, the Sheriff deduces that Robin uses Jerry to ferry information to and from a spy inside the castle, and tasks Tom to catch Jerry to flush out the traitor.

The very same night, Robin asks Jerry to deliver a love poem to Maid Marian (played by Red), his secret contact and love interest. However, Marian is being kept company by Tom, and upon spotting Jerry approaching the castle, he attempts to thwart the mouse but fails. The Sheriff devises a plan to capture Robin at a staged archery tournament, with a kiss from Marian as an additional enticement. Robin cannot resist the temptation and decides to participate, despite the misgivings of his men. When Jerry is chased by Tom while delivering a ring of love from Robin to Marian, he accidentally helps him win the contest; the Sheriff unmasks him and Robin and his men end up captured.

Jerry, the only Merry Man (besides Spike, Tyke and Friar Droopy) left at large, penetrates the castle to free his companions, but is discovered and engaged by Tom. As they fight in Marian’s room, they are accidentally evicted by the Sheriff, who then discovers that Marian is Robin’s informer and places her under arrest. Tom finally captures Jerry, but is rudely dismissed by John and the Sheriff, who have just learned to their dismay that King Richard, John’s brother and the rightful King of England, is returning from the Crusades much earlier than anticipated. John and the Sheriff begin to hatch a scheme to ambush and kill Richard before he can set foot on British soil, and also decide to execute Marian for her “treachery”. As a result, Tom revokes his loyalty to John, frees Jerry, and teams up with him to free Robin and the Merry Men from prison.

Meanwhile, John, the Sheriff, and their henchmen ride off to set their trap for Richard. Spike, Tyke and Droopy enter the castle unchallenged and, while looking for their comrades, end up freeing Marian. After Spike discovers the location of John’s ambush, Tom, Jerry, Robin and his men come to the rescue. They manage to arrive in the proverbial nick of time to thwart the assassination, forcing John and the Sheriff to resolve the matter in close combat. Just as Robin and Richard end up helplessly before them, Tom and Jerry intervene and engage the two traitors in a swordfight, allowing Robin and Richard to extricate themselves and reenter the fray. John and the Sheriff are captured, Richard returns to his throne, Robin and Marian get married, and Tom and Jerry are knighted for their services to the crown. The duo almost get into a chase when Jerry hits Tom with his sword by mistake, but Tom quickly forgives him.

== Voice cast ==
- Spike Brandt as Tom Cat, Jerry Mouse and Tyke (uncredited)
- Jamie Bamber as Robin Hood
- Phil LaMarr as Spike Bulldog
- Charles Shaughnessy as Sheriff of Nottingham
- John Michael Higgins as Prince John
- Grey DeLisle as Maid Marian
- Clive Revill as King Richard and Referee
- John DiMaggio as Little John and McWolf (uncredited)
- Joe Alaskey as Friar Tuck and Friar Droopy
- Greg Ellis as Will Scarlet and Tin
- Jess Harnell as Pan
- Richard McGonagle as Barney Bear and Alley

== Follow-up film ==
Tom and Jerry's Giant Adventure was released on August 6, 2013.

== See also ==
- List of films and television series featuring Robin Hood
