= Tom and Jerry: The Lost Dragon =

- DVD cover
- Directed by: Spike Brandt; Tony Cervone
- Written by: Brian Swenlin
- Based on: Tom and Jerry by: William Hanna; Joseph Barbera
- Produced by: Spike Brandt; Tony Cervone
- Starring: Kelly Stables; Vicki Lewis; Jim Cummings; Laraine Newman; Wayne Knight
- Edited by: Kyle Stafford
- Music by: Michael Tavera
- Production companies: Turner Entertainment Co. Warner Bros. Animation
- Distributed by: Warner Home Video
- Release dates: July 27, 2014 (SDCC International); August 19, 2014 (Digital); September 2, 2014 (DVD)
- Running time: 57 minutes
- Country: United States
- Language: English

Tom and Jerry: The Lost Dragon is a 2014 animated fantasy comedy direct-to-video film starring Tom and Jerry, produced by Warner Bros. Animation. Directed and produced by Spike Brandt and Tony Cervone, it premiered on July 27, 2014, at San Diego Comic-Con. It is the first Tom and Jerry direct-to-video film to be distributed by Warner Bros. Home Entertainment in Japan. It was originally released digitally on August 19, 2014, followed by a DVD release on September 2, 2014.

== Plot ==
Wizard Kaldorf expels a powerful witch named Drizelda from a village for multiple crimes. Kaldorf allows Drizelda's mistreated niece Athena to stay. The elf villagers fear she will turn out like her aunt because she keeps vermin (Jerry) and has an affection for cats (Tom). The cat and mouse in this timeline are babies and become frenemies to each other but friends with Athena, who is only a teenage barefoot girl.

The film fast forwards to Tom and Jerry chasing each other, as they usually do, and Athena caring for hurt animals, until the three happen to come across a mysterious glowing egg. What neither of them know is that this egg was stolen from a very large, fire-breathing dragon. In a short time, a baby dragon named Puffy hatches from this egg and believes that Tom is his mother, and the three take good care of him.

However, Puffy's real mother is angered that her baby is missing and wants him back, but before Tom, Jerry and Athena can even try to find her, Drizelda returns and captures Puffy, intending to use him for her own wicked plans — to steal his heat to become a super-dragon herself and destroy everything in the village. With the help of powerful allies and animal friends, Tom, Jerry, and Athena work together and fight tooth and claw to stop the evil witch and get Puffy back to his mother, eventually, Drizelda is turned into a statue, and the villagers, Jerry, Kaldorf, and even Athena are having a happy singing party, while Tom is chased by Athena's pet crocodile.

In a post-credits scene, Drizelda is shown to still be alive, despite being turned into a statue.

== Voice cast ==
- Spike Brandt as Tom Cat and Jerry Mouse (uncredited)
- Kelly Stables as Athena, a young green witch with a magic attitude, and Puffy, a green baby dragon
- Liz MacRae as Puffy (some lines, uncredited)
- Vicki Lewis as Drizelda, Athena's abusive maternal aunt and the main antagonist
- Jim Cummings as Kaldorf and Seller
- Laraine Newman as Emily, the Elf Elder's Wife
- Greg Ellis as Tin
- Jess Harnell as Pan
- Richard McGonagle as Alley
- Wayne Knight as The Elf Elder
- Dee Bradley Baker as Buster and Elf Boy
- Thor Bishopric as Second Elf Boy (uncredited)

== Reception ==
Renee Schonfeld of Common Sense Media gave the episode a 3 out of 5 stating "the engaging story [...] has more emotional impact than most".

== Follow-up film ==
Tom and Jerry: Spy Quest was released on June 23, 2015.
