= Tom and Jerry Tales =

American animated television series

- Title card
- Genre: Comedy; Slapstick; Adventure
- Based on: Tom and Jerry by: William Hanna; Joseph Barbera
- Developed by: Joseph Barbera; Rob LaDuca; Jeff Davison
- Voices of: Don Brown; Sam Vincent; Michael Donovan; Colin Murdock; Reece Thompson; Chantal Strand; Nicole Oliver; Janyse Jaud; Scott McNeil; Ellen Kennedy; David Kaye; Ashleigh Ball
- Theme music composer: Tom Erba
- Composers: Tom Erba (Season 1); Gordon Goodwin (Season 2)
- Country of origin: United States
- Original language: English
- No. of seasons: 2
- No. of episodes: 26 (78 segments) (list of episodes)

Production
- Executive producers: Joseph Barbera; Sander Schwartz
- Producers: Tom Minton; Frank Molieri
- Editors: Ken Solomon; Rob DeSales
- Running time: 21–23 minutes (6–8 minutes per segment)
- Production companies: Turner Entertainment Co.; Warner Bros. Animation; Warner Bros. Family Entertainment

Original release
- Network: The CW
- Release: September 23, 2006 – March 22, 2008

Related
- Tom & Jerry Kids (1990–93); The Tom and Jerry Show (2014–21)

Tom and Jerry Tales is an American animated television series featuring the cat-and-mouse duo Tom and Jerry. Produced by Warner Bros. Animation and Turner Entertainment Co., it is the seventh installment in the Tom and Jerry franchise as well as the first Tom and Jerry production to emulate the original theatrical shorts created by Hanna-Barbera founders and former Metro-Goldwyn-Mayer cartoon studio staff William Hanna and Joseph Barbera for Metro-Goldwyn-Mayer; it originally ran in the United States from September 23, 2006 to March 22, 2008, on The CW through its Kids' WB block.

The series consists of 26 episodes across two seasons, each consisting of three 7-minute segments with a shared theme and approximately the same length as the original theatrical shorts. Some shorts – like The Karate Guard – were produced and completed in September 2005 (explaining the 2005 copyright stamp in the end credits of the first season despite airing during the 2006–2007 season) as part of a 30-plus theatrical cartoon schedule canceled nearly two years after the financial failure of Looney Tunes: Back in Action (2003).

== Voice cast ==
- Don Brown as Tom and Droopy (season 1)
  - William Hanna as Tom's additional screams (only in archival audio recordings used in several season 1 episodes, albeit uncredited)
- Sam Vincent as Jerry, Sniffles, Snow Mouse and Kid
- Reece Thompson (season 1) and Chantal Strand (season 2) as Tuffy
- Michael Donovan as Spike, Droopy (season 2) and Topsy
- Colin Murdock as Butch and Meathead
- Nicole Oliver as Mrs. Two-Shoes and Baby Booties
- Trevor Devall as Radio Announcer
- Carlos Alazraqui as Casper Lombardo
- Ben Diskin as Ghost 2
- Saffron Henderson as Playtpus Mother
- Ted Cole as Monkey
- Richard Newman as Narrator
- Kelly Sheridan as Miss Shapely
- Maryke Hendrikse as Princess Alien Mouse
- Ellie Harvie as Rhino Mother
- Maxine Miller as Green Witch
- Ellen Kennedy as Purple Witch, Blue Witch Geraldine Mouse and Aunt Spinner
- Jake D. Smith as Baby Mouse
- Cathy Weseluck as Thomasina
- Nicole Bouma as Little Girl and Little Princess
- Tabitha St. Germain as White Hero
- Ian James Corlett as Bunny
- Scott McNeil as Rocket Shop Owner and Uncle Pecos
- David Kaye as Mauricio the Octopus
- Garry Chalk as Head Lifeguard
- Mark Oliver as Frankenstein
- Peter Kelamis as TV Announcer
- Janyse Jaud as Kitty
- Michael Dobson as Male Kangaroo
- John Payne as Buster
- Andrea Libman as Toodles Galore
- Brian Drummond as Joe Bear and Additional voices
- Louis Chirillo as Lion and Additional voices
- Lisa Ann Beley as Lionesses
- Paul Dobson as Drummer Rat
- Matt Hill as Surf Competition Announcer
- Chuck Huber as Bellhop
- Peter New as Tony the Greasy Pizza Guy
- Ashleigh Ball as Kangaroo Mother

== Episodes ==
Season	Segments	Episodes	Originally released	
Season	Segments	Episodes	First released	Last released
1	39	13	September 23, 2006	May 5, 2007
2	39	13	September 22, 2007	March 22, 2008

== Overseas animation studios ==
- Yearim Productions (Seoul, South Korea)
- Lotto Animation (Seoul, South Korea) (season 1)
- Rough Draft Korea (Seoul, South Korea) (season 2)
- Toon City (Manila, Philippines)

== Home media ==
Tom and Jerry Tales home video releases
Season	Episodes	Years active	Release dates
Season	Episodes	Years active	United States
1, 2	26	2006–07	Tom and Jerry Tales: Volume One was released on October 3, 2006. (Note: Released in the UK as Volume Four.) The episodes include: Ho Ho Horrors / Doggone Hill Hog / Northern Light Fish Fight / Way-Off Broadway / Egg Beats / Cry Uncle / Joy Riding Jokers / Cat Got Your Luggage? / City Dump Chumps / Tiger Cat / Feeding Time / Polar Peril.; Tom and Jerry Tales: Volume Two was released on May 15, 2007. (Note: Released in the UK as Volume One.) The episodes include: Octo Suave / Beach Bully Bingo / Treasure Map Scrap / Fire Breathing Tom Cat / Medieval Menace / The Itch / Digital Dilemma / Hi, Robot / Tomcat Jetpack / Piranha Be Loved By You / Spook House Mouse / Abracadumb.; Tom and Jerry Tales: Volume Three was released on December 4, 2007. (Note: Released in the UK as Volume Two.) The episodes include: Bats What I Like About the South / Fraidy Cat Scat / Tomb it May Concern / Cat Nebula / Martian Mice / Spaced Out Cat / Din-O-Sores / Freaky Tiki / Prehisterics / Destruction Junction / Battle of the Power Tools / Jackhammered Cat / Tin Cat of Tomorrow / Beefcake Tom / Tomcat Superstar.; Tom and Jerry Tales: Volume Four was released on March 11, 2008. (Note: Released in the UK as Volume Three.) The episodes include: Zent Out of Shape / I Dream of Meanie / Which Witch / More Powers to You / Catch Me Though You Can't / Power Tom / Don't Bring Your Pet to School Day / Cat Show Catastrophe / The Cat Whisperer with Casper Lombardo / Adventures in Penguin Sitting / Cat of Prey / Jungle Love.; Tom and Jerry Tales: Volume Five was released on August 12, 2008. The episodes include: Invasion of the Body Slammers / Monster Con / Over the River and Boo the Woods / Xtreme Trouble / A Life Less Guarded / Sasquashed / Summer Squashing / League of Cats / Little Big Mouse / Bend it Like Thomas / Endless Bummer / Game Set Match.; Tom and Jerry Tales: Volume Six was released on February 3, 2009. The episodes include: The Declaration of Independunce / Kitty Hawked / 24 Karat Kat / Hockey Schtick / Snow Brawl / Snow Mouse / DJ Jerry / Kitty Cat Blues / Flamenco Fiasco / You're Lion / Kangadoofus / Monkey Chow / Game of Mouse & Cat / Babysitting Blues / Catfish Follies.; Tom and Jerry Tales: Volumes 1–3 was released on September 15, 2009. This collection includes the first three volumes.; Tom and Jerry Tales: The Complete First Season, a two-disc set with the first thirteen episodes, was released on April 13, 2010. It was re-released on July 24, 2012 as part of Cartoon Network's 20th Anniversary.; Tom and Jerry: The Deluxe Anniversary Collection, a two-disc set (Game of Mouse & Cat only on disc 2), was released on June 22, 2010.; Tom and Jerry Fun Pack, a three-disc set (Tom and Jerry Tales: Volume One on disc 3), was released on June 28, 2011.; Tom and Jerry: Fur Flying Adventures: Volume 2 was released on July 5, 2011. Four episodes included: Monster Con / The Declaration of Independunce / Kitty Hawked / Which Witch! It was re-released on October 7, 2014 as Tom and Jerry and Friends: Volume 2.; Tom and Jerry: Fur Flying Adventures: Volume 3 was released on October 4, 2011. Eight episodes included: Beach Bully Bingo / A Life Less Guarded / Northern Light Fish Fight / Doggone Hill Dog / Sasquashed / Snow Mouse / Spook House Mouse / Don't Bring Your Pet to School.; Tom and Jerry: In a Dog House was released on March 6, 2012. Nine episodes included: 24 Karat Kat / Destruction Junction / Beefcake Tom / Bend It Like Thomas / Game Set Match / Feeding Time / DJ Jerry / Beach Bully Bingo / A Life Less Guarded.; Tom and Jerry: Summer Holidays was released on March 6, 2012. Two episodes included: Beach Bully Bingo / A Life Less Guarded.

All six volumes were later released in 2-packs.

== Video game ==
On October 31, 2006, a video game based on the series was released for the Nintendo DS and Game Boy Advance. Developed by Sensory Sweep Studios, it was published by Warner Bros. Interactive Entertainment and also published by Eidos Interactive (only in Europe and Australia). Playing as Jerry, the main objective of the game is to help Jerry get Tom into trouble. Many minor characters from the show make cameo appearances in the game, such as the female robotic mouse from the episode "Hi, Robot".

== See also ==
- Tom and Jerry Television
