= Tom and Jerry's Giant Adventure =

- DVD cover
- Directed by: Spike Brandt; Tony Cervone
- Written by: Paul Dini
- Based on: Tom and Jerry by William Hanna and Joseph Barbera; Tex Avery's characters and Barney Bear by Rudolf Ising and MGM cartoon studio Jack and the Beanstalk
- Produced by: Spike Brandt; Tony Cervone; Sam Register
- Starring: Jacob Bertrand; Tom Wilson; Grey DeLisle; Garrison Keillor; Paul Reubens
- Edited by: Kyle Stafford
- Music by: Michael Tavera
- Production companies: Turner Entertainment Co. Warner Bros. Animation
- Distributed by: Warner Home Video
- Release date: August 6, 2013
- Running time: 57 minutes
- Country: United States
- Language: English

Tom and Jerry's Giant Adventure is a 2013 animated fantasy comedy direct-to-video film starring Tom and Jerry, produced by Warner Bros. Animation. Tom and Jerry are the faithful servants of Jack, son of the founder of a struggling storybook amusement park that gets a boost from some magical beans.

It is the most recent Tom and Jerry cartoon to feature Red Hot Riding Hood.

== Plot ==
Tom and Jerry live with Jack and his mother in Storybook Town, a fairy tale-inspired theme park. The park has been ailing since the death of its founder, Jack's father. Young Jack is desperate to save the park from the hands of greedy billionaire Mr. Bigley who bought the park's mortgage, setting out with his loyal cat and mouse friends to sell his performing cow to make the next mortgage payment. Too late to sell it to a nearby circus, they trade the cow to a mysterious farmer named Farmer O'Dell for a handful of magic beans.

The film follows a journey up a beanstalk to Fairyland, a land ruled by a giant named Mr. Ginormous and home to fabled characters, some portrayed by classic MGM cartoon characters such as Droopy as Old King Cole and Screwy Squirrel as Simple Simon's pieman. Tom and Jerry must end their feud to save both Fairyland and Storybook Town.

== Cast ==
- Spike Brandt as Tom Cat (uncredited)
- William Hanna as Tyke (archive sound, uncredited)
- Jacob Bertrand as Jack Bradley
- Garrison Keillor as Narrator and Farmer O'Dell
- Tom Wilson as Mr. Bigley and Mr. Ginormous
- Kath Soucie as Tuffy
- Joe Alaskey as Droopy as Old King Cole
- Paul Reubens as Screwy Squirrel as the Pieman
- Richard McGonagle as Barney Bear
- Phil LaMarr as Spike as Old Mother Hubbard's Dog
- John DiMaggio as Meathead Dog as Simple Simon
- Grey DeLisle as Mrs. Bradley, Red as the Red Fairy

== Reception ==
Chaz Lipp states the film is "a harmless hour of fun that should ably hold the attention of its target audiences," but confused about the lack of "fighting, chasing and general struggle between the title characters."

== Follow-up film ==
Tom and Jerry: The Lost Dragon was released on September 2, 2014.
