= Tom and Jerry: Shiver Me Whiskers =

2006 film

- DVD cover
- Directed by: Scott Jeralds
- Written by: Christopher Painter
- Based on: Tom and Jerry by: William Hanna; Joseph Barbera
- Produced by: Tom Minton; Scott Jeralds
- Starring: Kevin Michael Richardson; Kathy Najimy; Charles Nelson Reilly; Wallace Shawn; Mark Hamill; Dan Castellaneta; William Hanna (uncredited)
- Edited by: Rob DeSales
- Music by: Mark Watters
- Production companies: Turner Entertainment Co. Warner Bros. Animation
- Distributed by: Warner Home Video
- Release date: August 22, 2006
- Running time: 74 minutes
- Country: United States
- Language: English

Tom and Jerry: Shiver Me Whiskers, shown in the movie as Tom and Jerry in Shiver Me Whiskers, is a 2006 direct-to-video animated swashbuckler adventure comedy film featuring the cat-and-mouse duo Tom and Jerry. Produced by Warner Bros. Animation and Turner Entertainment Co., directed by Scott Jeralds, and written by Christopher Painter, the film is the fourth direct-to-video Tom and Jerry film. It was released on DVD on August 22, 2006. It was later re-released on Blu-ray on March 12, 2013. The film follows Tom and Jerry as they try to find the Treasure of the Spanish Mane with a band of angry pirates on their tails.

== Plot ==
On the ocean, where an intense thunderstorm is raging, a group of red pirates is sailing on their ship, and Red Pirate Ron, who speaks in a language only understood by his parrot, Stan, warns his pirates to lower the sails. Meanwhile, Tom, who is also on the side of Red Pirate Ron, and Jerry, who is on no side at all, travel aboard the same pirate ship. Tom gets in trouble for slacking and is thrown around the ship. Tom then gets mad at Jerry, thinking this was all his fault and chases him, Jerry ends up blowing Tom up in a cannon. It is soon revealed that Ron is searching for the "Lost Treasure of the Spanish Mane," and by chance, a wave carries the map to the treasure aboard. Tom hides the map, but is warned by the ghost of the Spanish Mane's captain, Don Diego de Clippershears, that if the map is not put back into its bottle by sunset, a curse will begin. However, the bottle is swept off the ship, leaving Tom with no way to elude the curse.

At one point, Tom and Jerry escape from a giant squid, knocking it out with a cannon. Tom shoots Jerry off Ron's ship and onto another ship commanded by Ron's brother, Blue Pirate Bob, who also speaks with the help of his parrot, Betty. Jerry tells them about the map to avoid being eaten by Spike and alerts them to Ron's ship. Bob's crew manages to steal the map, but Ron retrieves it and shoots down his brother's ship. Ron's crew celebrates, but Jerry stops them by grabbing the treasure bottle from the ship, explaining the reason Tom lost the treasure bottle.

The sun sets, the ghost appears, and begins the curse as a crew of skeleton pirates is called forth. Ron's crew abandons ship, and their lifeboat lands on top of the giant squid that Tom and Jerry fought earlier. For not telling him about the curse (unaware that he can't speak), Ron makes Tom row. Eventually, as they near Yo Ho Island, Tom deserts and paddles off on an oar, with Jerry following him.

When Tom and Jerry arrive, they fight over who should keep the map. But when Tom falls into quicksand, Jerry saves him. The duo decides to stop fighting and finds the treasure together. After walking for a while, they meet Purple Pirate Paul, Ron and Bob's brother, and his parrot, Chuck. Paul, who leads a crew of monkeys and can actually speak real words (whilst Chuck cannot), tells him how the three used to make treasure maps when they were little aboard their mother's green pirate ship. Still, after they fought over the map about the Spanish Mane, their mother took all their maps, bottled them, and threw them overboard. Since Paul saw more of the map than his brothers, he took a rowboat to the island to search for the treasure and remained there for the next 40 years. Then, Ron and his crew show up and reunite with Paul, who insists on being called “Barnacle Paul” rather than Purple Pirate Paul, allowing Tom and Jerry to escape.

Tom and Jerry escape the pirates and monkeys and reach Don Diego's tomb, where the treasure is. Don Diego's spirit explains that they must defeat the tomb's guardian—a giant stone chicken—to enter. They manage to defeat it and retrieve a stone egg, which is the key to unlocking the tomb's entrance, though Tom ends their partnership after Jerry uses him as live bait. Because the entrance's lock resembles a frying pan, the duo solves the puzzle by cracking open the egg and placing it on the stone pan. After maneuvering through many traps and tests (including crushing pillars and a memory game), they reach the cave that contains the treasure. Don Diego urges Jerry to take it, but Jerry becomes suspicious, sensing a trick. He is proven correct when he sees that he must deal with the treasure's guardian first. Tom rushes inside and is shocked to see the same giant squid from earlier standing guard. When it recognizes Tom, it shrieks in fear, and a stalactite crushes it. Tom and Jerry retrieve some of the treasure and get out. When they exit the tomb, Ron, Paul, and Bob (after dismissing their parrots) begin to fight over the treasure. Jerry seizes this opportunity to sneak it onto Bob's ship, which has been fully repaired, and hoists the anchor, causing the ship to start sailing away. Tom and Spike follow Jerry by catapulting themselves onto the ship, where Jerry gives Spike a gold bone. The three commandeer the ship as it departs from the island, to the pirates’ horror.

In the end, Jerry becomes captain, with Spike being made to pilot the ship, and Tom being made to swab the deck (as punishment for accidentally landing his mouth on Spike’s gold bone); Stan, Betty, and Chuck join Jerry's crew; and all the now stranded pirates run from the stone chicken, which somehow reassembled itself.

== Voice cast ==
- William Hanna as Tom Cat and Jerry Mouse (archive recordings, uncredited)
- Kevin Michael Richardson as Ron, Bob and Chuck
- Kathy Najimy as Betty
- Charles Nelson Reilly as Stan
- Wallace Shawn as Paul and the Narrator
- Mark Hamill as Don Diego
- Dan Castellaneta as additional voices

== Widescreen ==
Tom and Jerry: Shiver Me Whiskers was the third Tom and Jerry film to be filmed in widescreen and the third one to be filmed in the high-definition format (the first being Tom and Jerry: Blast Off to Mars and Tom and Jerry: The Fast and the Furry), although the Region 1 DVD and the U.S. version of Boomerang were in full screen (cropping the left and right of the image) though not pan and scan as the camera stays directly in the center of the picture. Like other television shows and films filmed in high definition, the monitor the animation team would have worked from would have 16:9 and 4:3 safe areas, so that the full-screen version would not crop off too much of any important visual elements (such as characters). However, the film is broadcast in widescreen on Cartoon Network in the United States and released in widescreen on the Region A Blu-ray.

== Reception ==
David Cornelious of DVD Talk gave a positive review, saying it "has enough chuckles in it that it comes recommended to families and fans alike." Carrie R. Wheadon of Common Sense Media gave it a rating of three stars out of five, noting that moments are "may scare away younger fans, [but] there's some silliness too, that all ages may enjoy."

== Follow-up film ==
Tom and Jerry: A Nutcracker Tale was released on October 2, 2007.
