= Tom and Jerry: Spy Quest =

2015 film directed by Spike Brandt and Tony Cervone

- DVD cover
- Directed by: Spike Brandt; Tony Cervone
- Screenplay by: Jim Krieg; Heath Corson
- Story by: Jim Krieg
- Based on: Tom and Jerry by; William Hanna; Joseph Barbera; Jonny Quest by Doug Wildey; Characters by Hanna-Barbera Productions; Droopy by Tex Avery
- Produced by: Spike Brandt; Tony Cervone
- Starring: Reese Hartwig; Arnie Pantoja; James Hong; Tia Carrere; Tim Matheson
- Edited by: Kyle Stafford
- Music by: Michael Tavera
- Production company: Warner Bros. Animation (Note: Animation outsourced to Yearim Productions.)
- Distributed by: Warner Home Video
- Release dates: June 9, 2015 (Digital); June 23, 2015 (DVD)
- Running time: 73 minutes
- Country: United States
- Language: English

Tom and Jerry: Spy Quest is a 2015 American animated direct-to-video action comedy film produced by Warner Bros. Animation. Despite the film being purposed for the Tom and Jerry franchise, it is a crossover between Tom and Jerry and Hanna-Barbera's Jonny Quest and served as a direct sequel to the original 1964 series. It is also the first Jonny Quest entry produced without the assistance of William Hanna and Joseph Barbera, who died in 2001 and 2006 respectively. It was originally released digitally on June 9, 2015, followed by a DVD release on June 23, 2015. In this film, Jonny Quest's original voice actor, Tim Matheson, is involved.

== Plot ==
The film begins with a trip to the beach for Tom and Jerry who soon get into a chase. On the same day, the duo later encounter Jonny Quest and Hadji, along with their canine companion Bandit. Tom fights off an evil cat army and sends them to retreat. Later, they meet Race Bannon who takes them to Quest Labs where they meet Jonny's father, Dr. Benton Quest, who happens to have the Q sphere, a device that will solve the world's energy problems.

Meanwhile, Dr. Quest's nemesis, Dr. Zin soon finds out about the device and he sends his bumbling henchcats Tin, Pan and Alley to steal the device and kidnap Dr. Quest. That evening, Tom, Jerry, Bandit, Hadji, Dr. Quest, Jonny, and Race are having dinner. Tom is dissatisfied upon only having a bowl of milk. He tries to get the steak from Bandit which that dog isn't happy about, leaves himself still hungry when he and everyone else go to bed for the night. Before heading for bed, he learns and memorizes the security code, which is 1-2-3-4.

The security system is unlocked as Tom helps himself to the food and as a result, the cats easily break into the Quest Labs and abduct Dr. Quest along with Race and steal the device. Jonny Quest and Hadji wake up to see what has happened, rushing to the scene. They pinpoint to the location where the cat army has taken Dr. Quest and Race and rush off to rescue them. They head to Zin's island where Jonny and Hadji are captured by Zin's robots due to Tom's antics, However, Tom and Jerry escape.

Jerry decides to help them and Tom, who initially resisted helping them, joins the fight where they help Dr. Quest, Jonny and Hadji escape and successfully destroy the volcano which was to attack the White House. Zin tries to escape on his escape pod, but it is stolen by his henchcats, who get tired of his abuse, forcing Zin to hold on to the pod. Tom, Jerry, and Team Quest escape from the island with Jade and Droopy. Afterwards the President rewarded Team Quest and Jade with a medal, with Tom chasing Jerry after he made fun of Jerry's small medal.

== Voice cast ==
- Reese Hartwig as Jonny Quest
- Eric Bauza as Dr. Benton Quest
- Michael Hanks as Race Bannon
- Tia Carrere as Jezebel Jade
- James Hong as Dr. Zin
- Joe Alaskey as Droopy
- Greg Ellis as Tin
- Jess Harnell as Pan
- Richard McGonagle as Alley
- Arnie Pantoja as Hadji
- Grey DeLisle as Carol
- Tim Matheson as The President

== Reception ==
The film received positive reviews, with praise for its humour and many critics calling it an improvement from previous crossover films.

On the review aggregator website Rotten Tomatoes, Tom and Jerry: Spy Quest has an 81% approval rating, based on 5 reviews.

Common Sense Media gave the film one star.

== Follow-up film ==
Tom and Jerry: Back to Oz was released on June 21, 2016.
