= Tom and Jerry: A Nutcracker Tale =

- DVD cover
- Directed by: Spike Brandt; Tony Cervone
- Screenplay by: Spike Brandt
- Story by: Joseph Barbera
- Based on: Tom and Jerry by; William Hanna; Joseph Barbera; The Nutcracker and the Mouse King by E. T. A. Hoffmann
- Produced by: Spike Brandt; Tony Cervone
- Starring: Spike Brandt; Chantal Strand; Ian James Corlett; Kathleen Barr; Tara Strong; Garry Chalk; Trevor Devall
- Edited by: Robin DeSales
- Music by: Dirk Brossé
- Production company: Warner Bros. Animation
- Distributed by: Warner Home Video
- Release date: October 2, 2007
- Running time: 48 minutes
- Country: United States
- Language: English

Tom and Jerry: A Nutcracker Tale is a 2007 American direct-to-video animated Christmas fantasy comedy film. The film was produced by Warner Bros. Animation, Turner Entertainment Co. and Warner Bros. Family Entertainment, and is the first Tom and Jerry film directed by Spike Brandt and Tony Cervone. It serves as the fifth direct-to-video Tom and Jerry film and is a semi-adaptation of 1816 short story "The Nutcracker and the Mouse King" by E. T. A. Hoffmann, with Jerry in the role of the Nutcracker and Tom in the role of one of the Mouse King's (who is reimagined as a cat) henchmen.

Aside from being the last Tom and Jerry film to be released in a 1:33:1 full-screen format, A Nutcracker Tale was the last animated production that Hanna-Barbera's co-founder Joseph Barbera worked on before his death on December 18, 2006, and as such, the film was dedicated to his memory.

On August 13, 2020, it was announced that the film would be released on Blu-ray and special edition DVD, and paired with Tom and Jerry: Santa's Little Helpers. The bundle was released on October 27, 2020.

== Plot ==
After watching The Nutcracker, Jerry and his ward Tuffy find themselves pulled into the story by a magic miracle. The stage transforms into a wintry wonderland where the toys all enjoy a dinner feast. However, the magic also affects Tom and the other cats, led by the Cat King, who raid the feast and trap the toys while Jerry, a decoration named Paulie the pixie, and a toy horse named Nelly, who can only speak when someone pulls her string, try to stop them, but they end up shot out of a cannon and blasted far away.

Tom traps the music box Ballerina toy in a cage and brings her to the Cat King. When the Cat King learns that Jerry will not give up until the kingdom is reclaimed, he has Tom form a posse to destroy him. At the Ballerina Toy's urging, Tuffy secretly follows the cats to warn Jerry. Jerry, Tuffy, and their new friends decide to follow a star to meet the Toymaker, Santa Claus, the person who created the toys, and seek his aid. Tom chases them through several magical realms, and during the journey, Nelly is captured by the cats and is forced to tell them where the others are headed, leaving her discouraged at her betrayal. The remaining three make it to Santa and he fixes Paulie, who suffered damage during the journey, then makes him a real toy.

Santa warns Jerry that when the sun rises, the magic that created Jerry's kingdom will begin to fade, and if he fails to reclaim his kingdom before the sun fully rises on Christmas Morning, the cats will control of the kingdom forever and he gives them a key that allows them to awaken an army of toy soldiers. The three depart with their new army to take back the kingdom. When the cats attempt to escape the army of toy soldiers, the Ballerina frees herself and the other toys from captivity and leads them in an army against the Cat King. When Tom traps Jerry and Tuffy in his mouth, Nelly returns and breaks them out. Jerry throws the cats out of his kingdom on a train and back outside into the real world just before the sun finishes rising. However, a wall damaged by the battle collapses, and Nelly sacrifices herself to push Jerry and the Ballerina Toy out of the way. The magic miracle returns and restores Nelly, and allows her to speak without her string, and Jerry and the Ballerina get their crowns back and dance once again.

The events of the whole movie are revealed to be a play witnessed by the Ballerina from the Nutcracker and Santa Claus.

== Voice cast ==
- Spike Brandt as Jerry Mouse and Tom Cat
- Chantal Strand as Tuffy
- Tara Strong as La Petite Ballerina
- Ian James Corlett as Paulie
- Kathleen Barr as Nelly
- Garry Chalk as Cat King
- Trevor Devall as Lackey
- Mark Oliver as Dr. Malevolent
- Richard Newman as Santa Claus/Narrator

== Production ==
According to Brandt, Joseph Barbera decided on a Nutcracker adaptation as he thought its music fit perfectly with Tom and Jerry. The Amazon page for the DVD appeared sometime in August 2007.

=== Widescreen ===
Tom and Jerry: A Nutcracker Tale was the fourth Tom and Jerry film to be filmed in high-definition widescreen (the first three being Tom and Jerry: Blast Off to Mars, Tom and Jerry: The Fast and the Furry and Tom and Jerry: Shiver Me Whiskers), although the Region 1 DVD and the U.S. version of Boomerang were in full screen (cropping the left and right of the image). The film is broadcast in widescreen on Cartoon Network in the United States, as well as the 2020 Blu-ray and DVD version.

== Reception ==
Paul Mavis of DVD Talk gave the film a very positive review saying "Tom and Jerry: A Nutcracker Tale earns marks for embracing an operatic storyline while keeping the essential punish-Tom-with-pain gags that made Tom and Jerry such a successful franchise for decades." Meanwhile, Nick Lyons criticized it, stating "Tom And Jerry: A Nutcracker Tale is a rushed animated feature that was simply made to cash in on the Christmas holiday. Avoid this one and rent or buy a holiday classic like the animated Grinch."

Renee Schonfeld of Common Sense Media rated the film 4 out of 5 stars (making it the highest rated Tom and Jerry film on the site) saying "especially at holiday time, for kids who understand cartoon action, it's a delightful entertainment. Teens and grown-ups might like it, too."

== See also ==
- List of Christmas films
