= Joseph Barbera =

American animator and cartoonist (1911–2006)

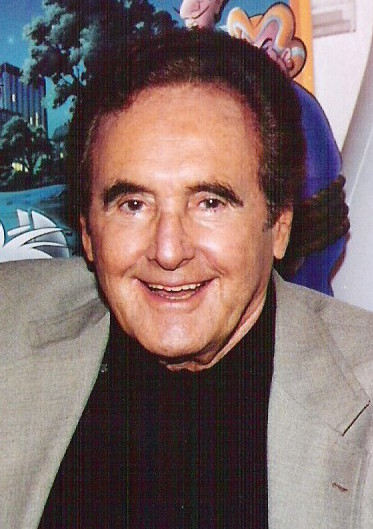
- Barbera in 1993
- Born: Joseph Roland Barbera; March 24, 1911; New York City, U.S.
- Died: December 18, 2006 (aged 95); Los Angeles, California, U.S.
- Burial place: Forest Lawn Memorial Park, Glendale, California
- Other name: Joe Barbera
- Occupations: Animator; cartoonist
- Years active: 1932–2006
- Employers: Fleischer Studios (1932); The Van Beuren Corporation (1932–1936); Terrytoons (1936–1937); MGM Cartoons (1937–1957); Hanna-Barbera (1957–2001); Warner Bros. Animation (2001–2006)
- Spouses: Dorothy Earl (m. 1935; div. 1963) Sheila Holden (m. 1963)
- Children: 4

Joseph Roland Barbera (/bɑːrˈbɛərə/ bar-BAIR-ə; Italian: [barˈbɛːra]; March 24, 1911 – December 18, 2006) was an American animator and cartoonist. He co-founded the animation studio Hanna-Barbera alongside William Hanna.

Born to Italian immigrants in New York City, Barbera hesitantly joined Van Beuren Studios in 1932 and subsequently Terrytoons in 1936. In 1937, he moved to California, and while working at Metro-Goldwyn-Mayer (MGM), Barbera met Hanna. The two men began a collaboration that was at first best known for producing Tom and Jerry.

In 1957, after MGM dissolved its animation department, they co-founded Hanna-Barbera, which became the most successful television animation studio in the business, producing programs such as The Flintstones, Yogi Bear, Scooby-Doo, Where Are You?, Top Cat, The Smurfs, Huckleberry Hound, and The Jetsons. In 1967, Hanna-Barbera was sold to Taft Broadcasting for $12 million, but Hanna and Barbera remained heads of the company. In 1991, the studio was sold to Turner Broadcasting System, which merged with Time Warner, owners of Warner Bros., in 1996; Hanna and Barbera stayed on as advisors.

Hanna and Barbera directed seven Academy Award-winning films and won eight Emmy Awards. Their cartoon shows have become cultural icons, and their cartoon characters have appeared in other media, such as films, books, and toys. Hanna-Barbera's shows had a worldwide audience of over 300 million people in the 1960s and have been translated into more than 28 languages.

== Early and personal life ==
Joseph Roland Barbera was born at 10 Delancey Street in the Little Italy, Lower East Side section of Manhattan, New York City, to Italian Sicilian immigrants Vincenzo Barbera (1884–1969), born in Castelvetrano and Francesca Calvacca (1892–1974), born in Sciacca. Joseph Barbera's grandmother, also named Francesca, was born in Sciacca as well, as stated in his autobiography, My life in 'toons, in which he also described himself as Sicilian. (Note: The Daily Telegraph mentioned in a 2006 obituary that his parents were of Lebanese descent without providing evidence and contradicting what Barbera states in his autobiography.) He grew up speaking Italian, he had two brothers, Larry (1909–1982) and Ted (1919–1994), both of whom served in World War II. As a member of the United States Army, Larry participated in the invasion of Sicily. Ted was a fighter pilot with the United States Army Air Forces and served in the Aleutian Islands Campaign. Barbera's father, Vincent, was the prosperous owner of three barbershops who squandered the family fortunes on gambling. By the time Barbera was 15, his father had abandoned the family, and his maternal uncle Jim had become a father figure to him.

Barbera displayed a talent for drawing as early as the first grade. He graduated from Erasmus Hall High School in Brooklyn in 1928. While in high school, Barbera won several boxing titles. He was briefly managed by World Lightweight Boxing Champion Al Singer's manager but soon lost interest in boxing. In 1935, Barbera married his high school sweetheart, Dorothy Earl. In school, they had been known as "Romeo and Juliet".

Barbera and his wife briefly separated when he went to California. They reunited but were on the verge of another separation when they discovered that Dorothy was pregnant with their first child. They had four children: two sons, Neal and an infant boy who died two days after his birth, and two daughters, Lynn and Jayne, who has been a producer in her own right. The marriage officially ended in 1963. Shortly after his divorce, Barbera met his second wife, Sheila Holden, sister of British rock and roll singer Vince Taylor, at Musso & Frank's restaurant, where she worked as bookkeeper and cashier. Unlike Dorothy, who preferred to stay at home with the children, Sheila enjoyed the Hollywood social scene that Barbera often frequented.

== Career ==
=== Early career ===
During high school, Barbera worked as a tailor's delivery boy. In 1929, he became interested in animation after watching a screening of Walt Disney's The Skeleton Dance. During the Great Depression, he tried unsuccessfully to become a cartoonist for The NY Hits Magazine. He supported himself with a job at a bank and continued to pursue publication for his cartoons. His magazine drawings of single cartoons, not comic strips, began to be published in Redbook, The Saturday Evening Post, and Collier's—the magazine with which he had the most success. Barbera also wrote to Walt Disney for advice on getting started in the animation industry. Disney wrote back, saying he would call Barbera during an upcoming trip to New York, but the call never occurred.

Barbera took art classes at the Art Students League of New York and the Pratt Institute and was hired to work in the ink and paint department of Fleischer Studios. In 1932, he joined the Van Beuren Studios as an animator and storyboard artist. He worked on cartoons such as the Aesop's Fables, Rainbow Parade, and Tom and Jerry series; the latter is not related to MGM's Tom & Jerry series. When Van Beuren closed in 1936, Barbera moved to Paul Terry's Terrytoons studio.

In 1935, Barbera created his first solo-effort storyboard, a prospective eleventh film featuring Kiko the Kangaroo. The storyline was of Kiko in an airplane race with another character called Dirty Dog. Terry declined to produce the story. In his autobiography, Barbera said of his efforts: "I was, quite honestly, not in the least disappointed. I had proven to myself that I could do a storyboard, and that I had gained the experience of presenting it. For now, that was enough." The original storyboard, passed down through the Barbera family, went on sale at auction in November 2013.

=== Film ===
Lured by a substantial salary increase, Barbera left Terrytoons alongside much of its best staff and New York for the new Metro-Goldwyn-Mayer cartoon department in California in 1937. He found that Los Angeles suffered just as much from the Great Depression as Brooklyn and almost returned to Brooklyn.

Barbera's desk was opposite that of William Hanna. The two quickly realized they would make a good team. By 1939, they had solidified a partnership that would last over 60 years. Barbera and Hanna worked alongside animator Tex Avery, who had created Daffy Duck and co-created Bugs Bunny for Warner Bros. and directed Droopy cartoons at MGM.

In 1940, Hanna and Barbera jointly directed Puss Gets the Boot, which was nominated for an Academy Award for Best (Cartoon) Short Subject. The studio wanted a diversified cartoon portfolio, so despite the success of Puss Gets the Boot, Barbera and Hanna's supervisor, Fred Quimby, did not want to produce more cat and mouse cartoons, believing that those were already enough. Surprised by the success of Puss Gets the Boot, Barbera and Hanna ignored Quimby's resistance and continued developing the cat-and-mouse theme.

By this time, Hanna wanted to return to working for Rudolf Ising, to whom he felt very loyal. Barbera and Hanna met with Quimby, who discovered that although Ising had taken sole credit for producing Puss Gets the Boot, he never worked on it. Quimby, who wanted to start a new animation unit independent from Ising, then permitted Hanna and Barbera to pursue their cat-and-mouse idea. The result was their most famous creation, Tom and Jerry.

Modeled after the Puss Gets the Boot characters with slight differences, the series followed Jerry, the pesky rodent who continuously outwitted his feline foe, Tom. Hanna said they settled on this cartoon's cat and mouse theme because "we knew we needed two characters. We thought we needed conflict, chase, and action. And a cat after a mouse seemed like a good, basic thought." The revamped characters first appeared in 1941's The Midnight Snack. Over the next 17 years, Barbera and Hanna worked exclusively on Tom and Jerry, directing more than 114 popular cartoon shorts. During World War II, they also made animated training films.

Tom and Jerry relied mostly on motion instead of dialog. Despite its popularity, Tom and Jerry has often been criticized as excessively violent. The series won its first Academy Award for the 11th short, The Yankee Doodle Mouse (1943)—a war-time adventure. Tom and Jerry was nominated for 14 Academy Awards, winning seven, more than any other animated series featuring the same characters. Tom and Jerry also made guest appearances in several of MGM's live-action films, including Anchors Aweigh (1945) and, Invitation to the Dance (1956) with Gene Kelly, and Dangerous When Wet (1953) with Esther Williams.

In addition to his work in animated cartoons, Barbera and Tom and Jerry layout artist Harvey Eisenberg moonlit to run a comic book company named Dearfield Publishing. Active from 1946 to 1951, Dearfield's titles included "Red" Rabbit Comics, Foxy Fagan, and Junie Prom.

Quimby accepted each Academy Award for Tom and Jerry without inviting Barbera and Hanna onstage. The cartoons were also released with Quimby listed as the sole producer, following the same practice for which he had condemned Ising. Quimby once delayed a promised raise to Barbera by six months. When Quimby retired in late 1955, Hanna and Barbera were placed in charge of MGM's animation division. As MGM began to lose more revenue on animated cartoons due to television, the studio soon realized that re-releasing old cartoons was far more profitable than producing new ones. In 1957, MGM ordered Barbera and Hanna's business manager to close the cartoon division and lay off everyone by phone. Barbera and Hanna found the no-notice closing puzzling because Tom and Jerry had succeeded.

=== Television ===
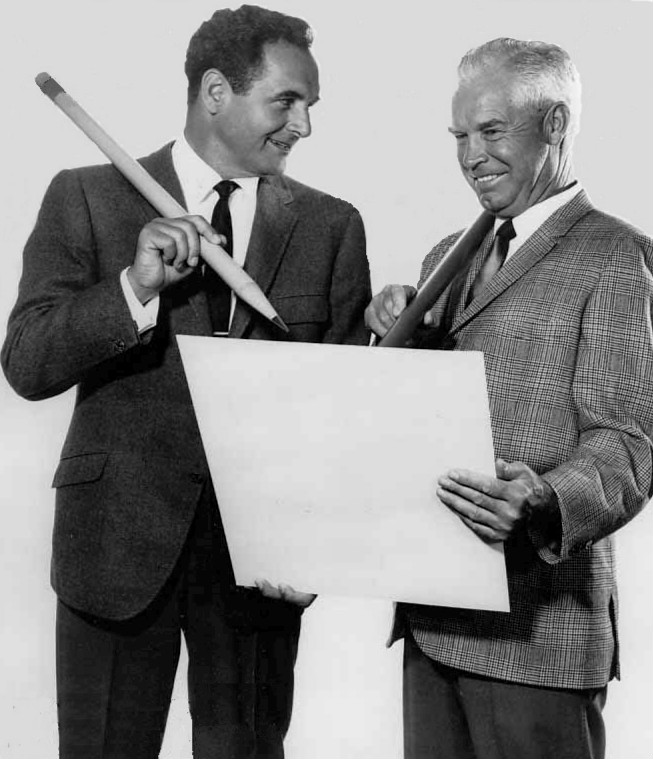
Barbera (left) and William Hanna from a television special for the premiere of their new Secret Squirrel/Atom Ant television program

In 1957, Barbera reteamed with his former partner Hanna to produce cartoon films for television and theatrical release. The two brought their different skills to the company as they had at MGM. Barbera was a skilled gag writer and sketch artist, while Hanna had a gift for timing, story construction, and recruiting top artists. Major business decisions would be made together, though each year, the title of president alternated between them. A coin toss gave Hanna precedence in the naming of the new company first called H-B Enterprises but soon changed to Hanna-Barbera Productions. Barbera and Hanna's MGM colleague George Sidney, the director of Anchors Aweigh, became the third partner and business manager in the company and arranged a deal for distribution and working capital with Screen Gems, the television division of Columbia Pictures, who took part ownership of the new studio.

The first offering from the new company was The Ruff & Reddy Show, a series which detailed the friendship between a dog and a cat. Despite a lukewarm response for their first theatrical venture, Loopy De Loop, Hanna-Barbera soon established themselves with two successful television series: The Huckleberry Hound Show and The Yogi Bear Show. A 1960 survey showed that half of the viewers of Huckleberry Hound were adults. This prompted the company to create a new animated series, The Flintstones. A parody of The Honeymooners, the new show followed a typical Stone Age family with home appliances, talking animals, and celebrity guests. With an audience of both children and adults, The Flintstones became the first animated prime-time show to be a hit. Fred Flintstone's signature exclamation, "yabba dabba doo", soon entered everyday usage, and the show boosted the studio to the top of the TV cartoon field. The company later produced a futuristic version of The Flintstones, known as The Jetsons. Although both shows reappeared in the 1970s and 1980s, The Flintstones was far more popular.

By the late 1960s, Hanna-Barbera Productions was the business's most successful television animation studio. The Hanna-Barbera studio produced over 3,000 animated half-hour television shows. Among the more than 100 cartoon series they produced were The Quick Draw McGraw Show, Top Cat, Jonny Quest, The Magilla Gorilla Show, The Atom Ant/Secret Squirrel Show, Scooby-Doo, Super Friends, and The Smurfs. The company also produced animated specials based on Alice in Wonderland, Jack and the Beanstalk, Cyrano de Bergerac, and feature-length films Charlotte's Web and Heidi's Song.

As popular as their cartoons were with 1960s audiences, they were disliked by artists. Television programs had lower budgets than theatrical animation, and this economic reality caused many animation studios to go out of business in the 1950s and 1960s, putting many people in the industry out of work. Hanna-Barbera was key in developing of an animation technique known as limited animation, which allowed television animation to be more cost-effective but often reduced quality. Hanna and Barbera had first experimented with these techniques in the early days of Tom and Jerry. To reduce the cost of each episode, shows often focused more on character dialogue than detailed animation.

The number of drawings for a seven-minute cartoon decreased from 14,000 to nearly 2,000, and the company implemented innovative techniques such as rapid background changes to improve viewing. Critics criticized the change from detailed animation to repetitive movements by two-dimensional characters. Barbera once said that they chose to adapt to the television budgets or change careers. The new style did not limit the success of their animated shows, enabling Hanna-Barbera to stay in business, providing employment to many who would otherwise have been out of work. Limited animation paved the way for future animated series such as The Simpsons, SpongeBob SquarePants, and South Park.

In December 1966, Hanna-Barbera Productions was sold to Taft Broadcasting, renamed Great American Communications in 1987, for $12 million. Barbera and Hanna remained at the head of the company until 1991. The company was sold to the Turner Broadcasting System for an estimated $320 million. Turner began using Hanna-Barbera's television catalog as material for its new Cartoon Network cable channel in 1992, and by the mid-1990s, Hanna-Barbera was producing several original series for Cartoon Network, among them Dexter's Laboratory and The Powerpuff Girls. In 1996, Turner merged with Time Warner, owners of Warner Bros., who eventually absorbed Hanna-Barbera into Warner Bros. Animation.

Barbera and Hanna continued to advise their former company. They periodically worked on new Hanna-Barbera shows, including shorts for the series The Cartoon Cartoon Show and feature film versions of The Flintstones (1994) and Scooby-Doo (2002). In a new Tom and Jerry cartoon produced in 2000, The Mansion Cat, Barbera voiced the house owner.

Ten days before Hanna's death from throat cancer in March 2001, Hanna-Barbera was absorbed into Warner Bros. Animation, with the unit dedicated to the Cartoon Network original series spun off into Cartoon Network Studios. Barbera remained active as an executive producer for Warner Bros. on direct-to-video cartoon features and television series such as What's New, Scooby-Doo? and Tom and Jerry Tales. He also wrote, co-storyboarded, co-directed, and co-produced The Karate Guard (2005), the return of Tom and Jerry to the big screen. His final animated project was the direct-to-video feature Tom and Jerry: A Nutcracker Tale (2007).

== Death ==
On December 18, 2006, Barbera died of natural causes at his home in Studio City, Los Angeles, California, aged 95, ending a seventy-year career in animation. His wife Sheila was at his side at the end; he was also survived by three children from his first marriage: Jayne (who worked for Hanna-Barbera), Lynn, and Neal. He is buried at Forest Lawn Memorial Park in Glendale, California.

== Legacy ==
Most of the cartoons Barbera and Hanna created revolved around close friendship or partnership; this theme is evident with Fred and Barney, Wilma Flintstone and Betty Rubble, Dick Dastardly and Muttley, Tom and Jerry, Scooby and Shaggy, Ruff and Reddy, Jake Clawson/Razor and Chance Furlong/T-Bone, Hong Kong Phooey and Spot, The Jetson family and Yogi & Boo-Boo. These may have reflected the close business friendship and partnership that Barbera and Hanna shared for over 60 years. Professionally, they balanced each other's strengths and weaknesses very well, but Barbera and Hanna traveled in entirely different social circles. Hanna's circle of personal friends primarily included other animators. Barbera socialized with Hollywood celebrities—Zsa Zsa Gabor was a frequent visitor to his house.

Their division of work roles complemented each other, but they rarely talked outside of work since Hanna was interested in the outdoors and Barbera liked beaches, good food and drinks. In their long partnership, in which they worked with over 2,000 animated characters, Barbera and Hanna rarely exchanged a cross word. Barbera said: "We understood each other perfectly, and each of us had a deep respect for the other's work." Hanna once said that Barbera could "capture mood and expression in a quick sketch better than anyone I've ever known."

Barbera and Hanna were also among the first animators to realize the enormous potential of television. Leonard Maltin says the Hanna–Barbera team "held a record for producing consistently superior cartoons using the same characters year after year—without a break or change in routine. Their characters are not only animated superstars, but also a very beloved part of American pop culture". They are often considered Walt Disney's only rivals in cartoon animation.

Barbera and Hanna had a lasting impact on television animation. Cartoons they created often make the greatest lists. Many of their characters have appeared in films, books, toys, and other media. Their shows had a worldwide audience of over 300 million people in the 1960s and have been translated into more than 20 languages. The works of Barbera and Hanna have been praised not only for their animation but for their music. The Cat Concerto (1946) and Johann Mouse (1952) have both been called "masterpieces of animation" largely because of their classical music.

The Hanna–Barbera team won seven Academy Awards and eight Emmy Awards, including the 1960 award for The Huckleberry Hound Show, which was the first Emmy awarded to an animated series. They also won these awards: Golden Globe for Television Achievement (1960), Golden IKE Award – Pacific Pioneers in Broadcasting (1983), Pioneer Award – Broadcast Music Incorporated (1987), Iris Award – NATPE Men of the Year (1988), Licensing Industry Merchandisers' Association award for Lifetime Achievement (1988), Governors Award of the Academy of Television Arts and Sciences (1988), Jackie Coogan Award for Outstanding Contribution to Youth through Entertainment Youth in Film (1988), Frederic W. Ziv Award for Outstanding Achievement in Telecommunications – Broadcasting Division College – Conservatory of Music University of Cincinnati (1989), stars on the Hollywood Walk of Fame (1976), several Annie Awards, several environmental awards, and were recipients of numerous other accolades before their induction into the Television Hall of Fame in 1994. In March 2005, the Academy of Television Arts & Sciences and Warner Bros. Animation dedicated a wall sculpture at the Television Academy's Hall of Fame Plaza in North Hollywood to Hanna and Barbera.

In 1992, Barbera met with pop musician Michael Jackson, an avid cartoon fan, in an unsuccessful attempt to arrange for Jackson to sing in Tom and Jerry: The Movie. Barbera drew five quick sketches of Tom and Jerry for Jackson and autographed them. Jackson autographed a picture of himself and his niece Nicole for Barbera with the words: "To my hero of yesterday, today, and tomorrow, with many thanks for all the many cartoon friends you gave me as a child. They were all I had. – Michael"

== See also ==
- Golden age of American animation
- Tom and Jerry filmography
- List of works produced by Hanna-Barbera Productions
- Peace on Earth (remade by Barbera and Hanna as Good Will to Men)
- Tom and Jerry awards and nominations
