= List of Warner Bros. Animation productions =

This is a list of animated feature films, shorts, specials, and television series produced by the American animation studio Warner Bros. Animation, which is part of the television division of Warner Bros. Entertainment.

== Television series ==
=== Original series ===
#	Title	Creator(s) / Developer(s)	Run date(s)	Network	Co-production with	Notes
1990s
1	Tiny Toon Adventures	Tom Ruegger	1990–1992	CBS (1990); Syndication (1990–1992); Fox Kids (1992)	Amblin Entertainment	
2	Taz-Mania	Art Vitello; Jean MacCurdy; Tom Ruegger	1991–1995	Fox Kids	Warner Bros. Family Entertainment (1993–1995)	
3	Batman: The Animated Series	Bruce Timm; Eric Radomski; Paul Dini; Mitch Brian	1992–1995	Fox Kids	Warner Bros. Family Entertainment (1993–1995)	Part of the DC Animated Universe.
4	The Plucky Duck Show	Tom Ruegger	1992	Fox Kids	Amblin Entertainment	Spin-off of Tiny Toon Adventures.
5	Animaniacs	Tom Ruegger	1993–1998	Fox Kids (1993–1994); Kids' WB (1995–1998)	Warner Bros. Family Entertainment; Amblin Entertainment	
6	The Sylvester & Tweety Mysteries	Fay Whitemountain	1995–2002	Kids' WB (1995–2000); Cartoon Network (2002)	Warner Bros. Family Entertainment	
7	Pinky and the Brain	Tom Ruegger	1995–1998	Kids' WB	Warner Bros. Family Entertainment; Amblin Entertainment	Spin-off of Animaniacs.
8	Freakazoid!	Bruce Timm; Paul Dini; Tom Ruegger	1995–1997	Kids' WB	Warner Bros. Family Entertainment; Amblin Entertainment	
9	Superman: The Animated Series	Alan Burnett; Paul Dini; Bruce Timm	1996–2000	Kids' WB	Warner Bros. Family Entertainment	Part of the DC Animated Universe.
10	Road Rovers	Tom Ruegger; Jeff Gordon	1996–1997	Kids' WB	Warner Bros. Family Entertainment	
11	Waynehead	Damon Wayans	1996–1997	Kids' WB	Warner Bros. Family Entertainment; Nelvana	
12	The New Batman Adventures	Paul Dini; Bruce Timm; Alan Burnett	1997–1999	Kids' WB	Warner Bros. Family Entertainment	Sequel to Batman: The Animated Series. Part of the DC Animated Universe.
13	Histeria!	Tom Ruegger	1998–2000	Kids' WB	Warner Bros. Family Entertainment	
14	Pinky, Elmyra & the Brain	Tom Ruegger	1998–1999	Kids' WB	Warner Bros. Family Entertainment; Amblin Entertainment	Spin-off of Tiny Toon Adventures and Animaniacs.
15	Batman Beyond	Bruce Timm; Paul Dini; Alan Burnett	1999–2001	Kids' WB	Warner Bros. Family Entertainment	Sequel to The New Batman Adventures. Part of the DC Animated Universe.
16	Detention	Bob Doucette; Julie McNally-Cahill; Tim Cahill; Michael Maler	1999–2000	Kids' WB	Warner Bros. Family Entertainment	
2000s
17	Static Shock	Christopher Simmons	2000–2004	Kids' WB	Warner Bros. Family Entertainment	Part of the DC Animated Universe.
18	The Zeta Project	Robert Goodman	2001–2002	Kids' WB	Warner Bros. Family Entertainment	Spin-off of Batman Beyond. Part of the DC Animated Universe.
19	Justice League	Bruce Timm	2001–2004	Cartoon Network	Warner Bros. Family Entertainment	Part of the DC Animated Universe.
20	¡Mucha Lucha!	Michael Ryan; Eddie Mort; Lili Chin	2002–2005	Kids' WB	Warner Bros. Family Entertainment	
21	Ozzy & Drix	Alan Burnett; Marc Hyman	2002–2004	Kids' WB	Warner Bros. Family Entertainment; Conundrum Entertainment	Spin-off of Osmosis Jones.
22	What's New, Scooby-Doo?	Sander Schwartz	2002–2006	Kids' WB	Warner Bros. Family Entertainment	
23	Teen Titans	Glen Murakami; Sam Register; David Slack	2003–2006	Cartoon Network	Warner Bros. Family Entertainment; DC Comics (season 5)	
24	Duck Dodgers	Spike Brandt; Tony Cervone	2003–2005	Cartoon Network (2003–2005); Boomerang (2005)	Warner Bros. Family Entertainment	
25	Xiaolin Showdown	Christy Hui; Brandon Sawyer	2003–2006	Kids' WB	Warner Bros. Family Entertainment	
26	Justice League Unlimited	Bruce Timm	2004–2006	Cartoon Network	Warner Bros. Family Entertainment; DC Comics (season 3)	Sequel to Justice League. Part of the DC Animated Universe.
27	The Batman	Michael Goguen; Duane Capizzi	2004–2008	Kids' WB; Cartoon Network (2004–2005)	Warner Bros. Family Entertainment; DC Comics (seasons 3–5)	
28	Krypto the Superdog	Alan Burnett; Paul Dini	2005–2006	Cartoon Network	Warner Bros. Family Entertainment; DC Comics (season 2)	
29	Johnny Test	Scott Fellows; Aaron Simpson	2005–2006	Kids' WB	Warner Bros. Family Entertainment; Coliseum Entertainment	Season 1 only. Studio credit for season 2. Rights owned by WildBrain, though Warner Bros. still owns the trademark.
30	Coconut Fred's Fruit Salad Island!	Sammy Oriti; Don Oriolo	2005–2006	Kids' WB	Warner Bros. Family Entertainment	
31	Loonatics Unleashed	Christian Tremblay; Yvon Tremblay	2005–2007	Kids' WB	Warner Bros. Family Entertainment	
32	Tom and Jerry Tales	Joseph Barbera; Rob LaDuca; Jeff Davison	2006–2008	Kids' WB	Warner Bros. Family Entertainment; Turner Entertainment Co.	
33	Shaggy and Scooby-Doo Get a Clue!	Ray DeLaurentis	2006–2008	Kids' WB	Warner Bros. Family Entertainment	
34	Legion of Super Heroes	Amy Wolfram	2006–2008	Kids' WB	Warner Bros. Family Entertainment; DC Comics	
35	Batman: The Brave and the Bold	James Tucker; Michael Jelenic	2008–2011	Cartoon Network	DC Comics	
2010s
36	Scooby-Doo! Mystery Incorporated	Mitch Watson; Spike Brandt; Tony Cervone	2010–2013	Cartoon Network		
37	Mad	Kevin Shinick	2010–2013	Cartoon Network		
38	Young Justice	Brandon Vietti; Greg Weisman	2010–2022	Cartoon Network (2010–2013); DC Universe (2019); HBO Max (2021–2022)	DC Entertainment	
39	The Looney Tunes Show	Sam Register; Spike Brandt; Tony Cervone	2011–2014	Cartoon Network		
40	ThunderCats	Ethan Spaulding; Michael Jelenic	2011–2012	Cartoon Network		
41	Green Lantern: The Animated Series	Bruce Timm; Giancarlo Volpe; Jim Krieg	2011–2013	Cartoon Network	DC Entertainment	
42	Teen Titans Go!	Aaron Horvath; Michael Jelenic	2013–present	Cartoon Network	DC Entertainment	
43	Beware the Batman	Glen Murakami; Sam Register; Mitch Watson; Butch Lukic	2013–2014	Cartoon Network (2013); Toonami (2014)	DC Entertainment	
44	The Tom and Jerry Show	Darrell Van Citters	2014–2021	Cartoon Network (2014–2016); Boomerang SVOD (2017–2021); Cartoon Network App (2021); Boomerang (2021)	Turner Entertainment Co.	
45	New Looney Tunes	Erik Kuska	2015–2020	Cartoon Network (2015–2016); Boomerang (2015–2016); Boomerang SVOD (2017–2020)		Formerly known as Wabbit: A Looney Tunes Production (or Bugs! in other countries) during season 1.
46	Be Cool, Scooby-Doo!	Jon Colton Barry; Zac Moncrief	2015–2018	Cartoon Network (2015–2016); Boomerang (2015–2017); Boomerang SVOD (2017–2018)		
47	Bunnicula	Jessica Borutski	2016–2018	Cartoon Network (2016); Boomerang (2016–2017); Boomerang SVOD (2017–2018)		
48	Right Now Kapow	Justin Becker; Marly Halpern-Graser	2016–2017	Disney XD		
49	Justice League Action	Alan Burnett	2016–2018	Cartoon Network	DC Entertainment	
50	Dorothy and the Wizard of Oz	Jeff DeGrandis	2017–2020	Boomerang	Turner Entertainment Co.	
51	Wacky Races	Rebecca Himot; Tramm Wigzell	2017–2019	Boomerang		Reboot of the original 1968 animated series.
52	Unikitty!	Ed Skudder; Lynn Wang	2017–2020	Cartoon Network	The Lego Group	Spin-off of The Lego Movie.
53	DC Super Hero Girls	Lauren Faust	2019–2021	Cartoon Network	DC Entertainment	Reboot of the original 2015 web series.
54	Scooby-Doo and Guess Who?	Chris Bailey	2019–2021	Boomerang (2019–2021); HBO Max (2021)		
55	Green Eggs and Ham	Jared Stern	2019–2022	Netflix	Gulfstream Pictures; A Stern Talking To; A Very Good Production	
2020s
56	ThunderCats Roar	Victor Courtright; Marly Halpern-Graser	2020	Cartoon Network		
57	Looney Tunes Cartoons	Pete Browngardt	2020–2024	HBO Max (2020–2023); Max (2023–2024)		
58	Animaniacs	Wellesley Wild; Steven Spielberg	2020–2023	Hulu	Amblin Television	Revival of the original 1993 animated series.
59	Tom and Jerry in New York	Darrell Van Citters	2021	HBO Max	Turner Entertainment Co.	Spin-off of The Tom and Jerry Show. Loosely based on Tom & Jerry.
60	Jellystone!	C. H. Greenblatt	2021–2025	HBO Max (2021–2022); Max (2024–2025)		
61	Yabba Dabba Dinosaurs	Mark Marek; Marly Halpern-Graser	2021–2022	HBO Max		Spin-off of The Flintstones.
62	Aquaman: King of Atlantis	Victor Courtright; Marly Halpern-Graser	2021	HBO Max	Atomic Monster; DC Entertainment	Miniseries.
63	Gremlins: Secrets of the Mogwai	Tze Chun	2023–2025	Max	Amblin Television	Animated prequel series of Gremlins.
64	My Adventures with Superman	Jake Wyatt	2023–present	Adult Swim	DC Entertainment (seasons 1-2); DC Studios (season 3–present)	
65	Tiny Toons Looniversity	Erin Gibson; Nate Cash	2023–2025	Max; Cartoon Network	Amblin Television	Reboot of Tiny Toon Adventures.
66	Bat-Fam	Mike Roth	2025–present	Amazon Prime Video	DC Entertainment; Amazon MGM Studios	Sequel to Merry Little Batman.
Upcoming
67	Yokoso Scooby-Doo!	Itsuro Kawasaki; Francisco Paredes	TBA	Tubi (U.S.); Cartoon Network (International only)	OLM, Inc.	Formerly known as Go-Go Mystery Machine during development and was originally planned to air on Cartoon Network in the U.S.
68	Untitled Blue Beetle series	Miguel Puga	TBA	TBA	DC Studios	Sequel to Blue Beetle. Animated series part of the DC Universe.
69	My Adventures with Green Lantern	Jake Wyatt	TBA	TBA	DC Studios	Spin-off of My Adventures with Superman.
70	DC Super Powers	Matthew Beans	TBA	TBA	DC Studios	
71	Starfire	Josie Campbell; Brianne Drouhard; Sarah Nerboso	TBA	TBA	DC Studios	
72	Mister Miracle	Tom King	TBA	TBA	DC Studios	Animated series part of the DC Universe.
73	Absolute Batman	Scott Snyder	TBA	TBA	DC Studios	
74	Krypto	C. H. Greenblatt	TBA	TBA	DC Studios	
75	Joker: Laugh Riot	Yasuhiro Aoki	TBA	TBA	DC Studios; Sola Entertainment	First anime series produced by Warner Bros. Animation.

=== Preschool series ===
#	Title	Creator(s) / Developer(s)	Run date(s)	Network	Co-production with	Notes
2000s
76	Baby Looney Tunes	Sander Schwartz	2002–2005	Cartoon Network	Warner Bros. Family Entertainment	
77	Firehouse Tales	Sidney J. Bailey	2005–2006	Cartoon Network	Warner Bros. Family Entertainment	
2020s
78	Little Ellen	Kevin A. Leman II; Jennifer Skelly	2021–2022	HBO Max; Cartoonito	Ellen Digital Ventures	
79	Bugs Bunny Builders	Jacob Fleisher	2022–present	Cartoon Network; Cartoonito		
80	Batwheels	Michael G. Stern	2022–present	Cartoon Network; Cartoonito	DC Entertainment	

=== Adult animated series ===
#	Title	Creator(s) / Developer(s)	Run date(s)	Network	Co-production with	Notes
2000s
81	3-South	Mark Hentemann	2002–2003	MTV	MTV Animation; Hentermann Films	Rights owned by Skydance Corporation via MTV Entertainment Studios
2010s
82	Mike Tyson Mysteries	Mike Tyson; Lee Stimmel; Hugh Davidson; Giancarlo Volpe	2014–2020	Adult Swim	Williams Street	First collaboration with sister company Williams Street
83	Harley Quinn	Justin Halpern; Patrick Schumacker; Dean Lorey	2019–2025	DC Universe (2019–2020); HBO Max (2022–2023); Max (2023–2025)	Ehsugadee Productions (seasons 1–2); Delicious Non-Sequitur (season 3–5); Yes, Norman Productions; Lorey Stories (season 5); DC Entertainment	
2020s
84	Velma	Charlie Grandy	2023–2024	HBO Max (2023); Max (2024)	Charlie Grandy Productions; Kaling International; 3 Arts Entertainment	
85	Kite Man: Hell Yeah!	Justin Halpern; Patrick Schumacker; Dean Lorey	2024	Max	Delicious Non-Sequitur; Yes, Norman Productions; Lorey Stories; DC Entertainment	Formerly known as Noonan's during development. Spin-off of Harley Quinn
86	Batman: Caped Crusader	Bruce Timm	2024–present	Amazon Prime Video	Bad Robot Productions; 6th & Idaho Motion Picture Company; DC Entertainment (season 1); DC Studios (season 2–present); Amazon MGM Studios	
87	Creature Commandos	James Gunn	2024–present	Max	Troll Court Entertainment; The Safran Company; Lorey Stories; DC Studios	Animated series part of the DC Universe
88	Get Jiro	Brain Gatewood; Alessandro Tanaka	2026–present	Adult Swim	Multiverse Cowboy; G&T Productions; DC Studios	
Upcoming
89	Keeping Up with the Joneses	Hugh Davidson; Larry Dorf; Rachel Ramras	TBA	Adult Swim		
90	Hit Squad	TBA	TBA	TBA	Hanna-Barbera Studios Europe; Mr Morris Productions; Anderson Entertainment	

=== Short series ===
Title	Creator(s) / Developer(s)	Year(s)	Network	Co-production with	Notes
2000s
Gotham Girls	NoodleSoup Productions; Warner Bros. Animation	2000–2002	Warnerbros.com	NoodleSoup Productions	
Lobo	NoodleSoup Productions; Warner Bros. Animation	2000	Warnerbros.com	NoodleSoup Productions	
Cartoon Monsoon	NoodleSoup Productions; Warner Bros. Animation	2003–2004	Warnerbros.com	NoodleSoup Productions	
2010s
DC Nation Shorts		2011–2014	Cartoon Network	DC Entertainment	Anthology and variety series.
Batman Unlimited		2015–2016	YouTube	DC Entertainment	
DC Super Friends		2015	YouTube	DC Entertainment; Imaginext	
The Flaming C	Conan O'Brien	2015	TBS	Conaco	
Justice League: Gods and Monsters Chronicles	Bruce Timm; Alan Burnett; Sam Liu	2015	Machinima	DC Entertainment; Blue Ribbon Content	Prequel to Justice League: Gods and Monsters.
Vixen		2015–2016	CW Seed	DC Entertainment; Blue Ribbon Content	Animated spin-off series of the Arrowverse.
DC Super Hero Girls	Shea Fontana; Lisa Yee; Aria Moffly	2015–2018	YouTube	DC Entertainment	
Justice League Action Shorts	Alan Burnett	2017	YouTube	DC Entertainment	
Lego DC Super Hero Girls		2017	YouTube	DC Entertainment; The Lego Group	
Freedom Fighters: The Ray		2017–2018	CW Seed	DC Entertainment; Blue Ribbon Content	Animated spin-off series of the Arrowverse.
Constantine: City of Demons		2018–2019	CW Seed	DC Entertainment; Blue Ribbon Content; Berlanti Productions; Phantom Four Productions	Spin-off of Justice League Dark.
DC Super Hero Girls: Super Shorts	Lauren Faust	2019–2020	YouTube	DC Entertainment	
2020s
Deathstroke: Knights & Dragons		2020	CW Seed	DC Entertainment; Blue Ribbon Content; Berlanti Productions	
Tom and Jerry Special Shorts	Pete Browngardt	2021	HBO Max	Turner Entertainment Co.	
Jellystone! shorts	C. H. Greenblatt	2021	YouTube		
Batwheels shorts	Michael G. Stern	2022–2023	HBO Max (2022–2023); Max (2023); Cartoonito	DC Entertainment	
Bugs Bunny Builders shorts		2022–2023	Cartoonito		
Looney Tunes: ACME Fools		2023	YouTube; Cartoon Network		
Tom and Jerry		2023	Cartoon Network; HBO Go	Turner Entertainment Co.	
Krypto Saves the Day!	Ryan Kramer	2025–present	YouTube	DC Studios	

== Feature films ==
=== Theatrical features ===
Title	Release date	Co-production with	Rotten Tomatoes	Metacritic	Budget	Gross	Notes
1980s
The Looney Looney Looney Bugs Bunny Movie	November 20, 1981						Anthology film.
Bugs Bunny's 3rd Movie: 1001 Rabbit Tales	November 19, 1982					$78,350	Anthology film.
Daffy Duck's Fantastic Island	August 5, 1983						Anthology film.
Daffy Duck's Quackbusters	September 24, 1988						Anthology film.
1990s
Batman: Mask of the Phantasm	December 25, 1993	Warner Bros. Family Entertainment	83%	65	$6 million	$5.8 million	Based on Batman: The Animated Series.
Space Jam^{[S]}	November 15, 1996	Warner Bros. Family Entertainment	46%	57	$80 million	$230.4 million	First original Looney Tunes feature. First film from Warner Bros. Feature Animation and first live-action/animated film.
Cats Don't Dance	March 26, 1997	Warner Bros. Family Entertainment; Turner Feature Animation; David Kirschner Productions	71%	62	$32 million	$3.5 million	
Quest for Camelot	May 15, 1998	Warner Bros. Family Entertainment	41%	50	$40 million	$38.1 million	First fully animated film from Warner Bros. Feature Animation.
The Iron Giant	August 6, 1999		96%	85	$70–80 million	$31.3 million	Second and final fully animated film from Warner Bros. Feature Animation. Only film to use a WBFA logo.
2000s
Osmosis Jones^{[S]}	August 10, 2001	Conundrum Entertainment	55%	57	$70 million	$14 million	Second live-action/animated film from Warner Bros. Feature Animation.
Looney Tunes: Back in Action^{[S]}	November 14, 2003	Baltimore Spring Creek Productions; Goldmann Pictures	57%	64	$80 million	$68.5 million	Third live-action/animated film and final production from Warner Bros. Feature Animation.
2010s
Teen Titans Go! To the Movies	July 27, 2018	DC Entertainment	92%	69	$10 million	$52.1 million	First theatrical film to use a Warner Bros. Animation logo. Based on Teen Titans Go!.
2020s
The Lord of the Rings: The War of the Rohirrim	December 13, 2024	New Line Cinema; WingNut Films; Sola Entertainment	48%	57	$30 million	$20.5 million	First anime film from Warner Bros. Animation. Prequel to and based on The Lord of the Rings by J. R. R. Tolkien and its film trilogy adaptation.
The Day the Earth Blew Up	March 14, 2025		86%	82	$15 million	$15 million	First fully-animated theatrical Looney Tunes feature. Final theatrical film produced by Warner Bros. Animation. Based on Looney Tunes Cartoons. Distributed by Ketchup Entertainment.

^{S} Combines live-action with animation.

=== Direct-to-video features ===
Title	Release date	Co-production with	Notes
1990s
Tiny Toon Adventures: How I Spent My Vacation	March 11, 1992	Warner Bros. Family Entertainment; Amblin Entertainment	
Batman & Mr. Freeze: SubZero	March 17, 1998	Warner Bros. Family Entertainment	
Scooby-Doo on Zombie Island	September 22, 1998	Warner Bros. Family Entertainment; Hanna-Barbera Productions	
Scooby-Doo! and the Witch's Ghost	October 5, 1999	Warner Bros. Family Entertainment; Hanna-Barbera Productions	
Wakko's Wish	December 21, 1999	Warner Bros. Family Entertainment; Amblin Entertainment	
2000s
Tweety's High-Flying Adventure	September 12, 2000	Warner Bros. Family Entertainment	
Scooby-Doo and the Alien Invaders	October 3, 2000	Warner Bros. Family Entertainment; Hanna-Barbera Productions	
Batman Beyond: Return of the Joker	December 12, 2000	Warner Bros. Family Entertainment	
Scooby-Doo and the Cyber Chase	October 9, 2001	Warner Bros. Family Entertainment; Hanna-Barbera Productions	
Tom and Jerry: The Magic Ring	November 12, 2001	Warner Bros. Family Entertainment; Turner Entertainment Co.	
Baby Looney Tunes' Eggs-traordinary Adventure	February 11, 2003	Warner Bros. Family Entertainment	Split into two episodes of Baby Looney Tunes in later television reruns and digital releases, as part of season 1 of the show.
Scooby-Doo! and the Legend of the Vampire	March 4, 2003	Warner Bros. Family Entertainment; Hanna-Barbera Productions	
Scooby-Doo! and the Monster of Mexico	September 30, 2003	Warner Bros. Family Entertainment; Hanna-Barbera Productions	
Batman: Mystery of the Batwoman	October 21, 2003	Warner Bros. Family Entertainment	
Scooby-Doo! and the Loch Ness Monster	June 22, 2004	Warner Bros. Family Entertainment; Hanna-Barbera Productions	
¡Mucha Lucha!: The Return of El Maléfico	October 5, 2004	Warner Bros. Family Entertainment	
Kangaroo Jack: G'Day U.S.A.!	November 16, 2004	Warner Bros. Family Entertainment; Castle Rock Entertainment	Serves as an animated sequel to Kangaroo Jack.
Tom and Jerry: Blast Off to Mars	January 18, 2005	Warner Bros. Family Entertainment; Turner Entertainment Co.	
Aloha, Scooby-Doo!	February 8, 2005	Warner Bros. Family Entertainment; Hanna-Barbera Productions	
Tom and Jerry: The Fast and the Furry	September 3, 2005	Warner Bros. Family Entertainment; Turner Entertainment Co.	Limited theatrical release.
The Batman vs. Dracula	October 18, 2005	Warner Bros. Family Entertainment; DC Comics	
Scooby-Doo! in Where's My Mummy?	December 13, 2005	Warner Bros. Family Entertainment; Hanna-Barbera Productions	Limited theatrical release.
Superman: Brainiac Attacks	June 20, 2006	Warner Bros. Family Entertainment; DC Comics	
Tom and Jerry: Shiver Me Whiskers	August 22, 2006	Warner Bros. Family Entertainment; Turner Entertainment Co.	
Scooby-Doo! Pirates Ahoy!	September 19, 2006	Warner Bros. Family Entertainment; Hanna-Barbera Productions	
Bah, Humduck! A Looney Tunes Christmas	November 14, 2006	Warner Bros. Family Entertainment	
Chill Out, Scooby-Doo!	September 4, 2007	Warner Bros. Family Entertainment; Hanna-Barbera Productions	
Superman: Doomsday	September 18, 2007	Warner Premiere; DC Comics	
Tom and Jerry: A Nutcracker Tale	October 2, 2007	Warner Bros. Family Entertainment; Turner Entertainment Co.	
Justice League: The New Frontier	February 26, 2008	Warner Premiere; DC Comics	
Batman: Gotham Knight^{[A]}	July 8, 2008	Warner Premiere; DC Comics; Studio 4 °C; Production I.G; Bee Train Production; Madhouse	Collection of six shorts, anime.
Scooby-Doo! and the Goblin King	September 23, 2008	Warner Premiere; Hanna-Barbera Productions	
Wonder Woman	March 3, 2009	Warner Premiere; DC Comics	First use of the Warner Bros. Animation logo for a film.
Scooby-Doo! and the Samurai Sword	April 7, 2009	Warner Premiere; Hanna-Barbera Productions	
Green Lantern: First Flight	July 28, 2009	Warner Premiere; DC Comics	
Superman/Batman: Public Enemies	September 29, 2009	Warner Premiere; DC Entertainment	
2010s
Scooby-Doo! Abracadabra-Doo	February 16, 2010	Warner Premiere	
Justice League: Crisis on Two Earths	February 23, 2010	Warner Premiere; DC Entertainment	
Batman: Under the Red Hood^{[A]}	July 27, 2010	Warner Premiere; DC Entertainment	
Tom and Jerry Meet Sherlock Holmes	August 16, 2010	Warner Premiere; Turner Entertainment Co.	
Scooby-Doo! Camp Scare	September 14, 2010	Warner Premiere	
Superman/Batman: Apocalypse	September 28, 2010	Warner Premiere; DC Entertainment	
All-Star Superman	February 22, 2011	Warner Premiere; DC Entertainment	
Green Lantern: Emerald Knights	June 7, 2011	Warner Premiere; DC Entertainment	
Tom and Jerry & the Wizard of Oz	August 23, 2011	Warner Premiere; Turner Entertainment Co.	
Scooby-Doo! Legend of the Phantosaur	September 6, 2011	Warner Premiere	
Batman: Year One^{[A]}	October 18, 2011	Warner Premiere; DC Entertainment	
Justice League: Doom	February 28, 2012	Warner Premiere; DC Entertainment	
Scooby-Doo! Music of the Vampire	March 13, 2012	Warner Premiere	
Superman vs. The Elite	June 12, 2012	Warner Premiere; DC Entertainment	
Batman: The Dark Knight Returns – Part 1^{[A]}	September 25, 2012	Warner Premiere; DC Entertainment	
Tom and Jerry: Robin Hood and His Merry Mouse	September 28, 2012	Warner Premiere; Turner Entertainment Co.	
Big Top Scooby-Doo!	October 9, 2012	Warner Premiere	
Batman: The Dark Knight Returns – Part 2^{[A]}	January 29, 2013	Warner Premiere; DC Entertainment	
Scooby-Doo! Mask of the Blue Falcon	February 26, 2013	Warner Premiere	
Superman: Unbound	May 7, 2013	Warner Premiere; DC Entertainment	
Scooby-Doo! Adventures: The Mystery Map	July 23, 2013	Spiffy Pictures	Live-action/puppet film.
Justice League: The Flashpoint Paradox	July 30, 2013	DC Entertainment	
Tom and Jerry's Giant Adventure	August 6, 2013	Turner Entertainment Co.	
Scooby-Doo! Stage Fright	August 20, 2013	Warner Premiere	
JLA Adventures: Trapped in Time	January 21, 2014	DC Entertainment	
Justice League: War	February 4, 2014	DC Entertainment	
Scooby-Doo! WrestleMania Mystery	March 25, 2014	WWE Studios	
Son of Batman	May 6, 2014	DC Entertainment	
Tom and Jerry: The Lost Dragon	July 27, 2014	Turner Entertainment Co.	
Batman: Assault on Arkham	August 12, 2014	DC Entertainment	
Scooby-Doo! Frankencreepy	August 19, 2014		
Justice League: Throne of Atlantis	January 27, 2015	DC Entertainment	
Lego DC Comics Super Heroes: Justice League vs. Bizarro League	February 10, 2015	The Lego Group; DC Entertainment	
Scooby-Doo! Moon Monster Madness	February 17, 2015		
The Flintstones & WWE: Stone Age SmackDown!	March 10, 2015	Hanna-Barbera Cartoons; WWE Studios	
Batman vs. Robin	April 14, 2015	DC Entertainment	
Batman Unlimited: Animal Instincts	May 12, 2015	DC Entertainment	
Tom and Jerry: Spy Quest	June 23, 2015	Turner Entertainment Co.	
Scooby-Doo! and Kiss: Rock and Roll Mystery	July 21, 2015		
Justice League: Gods and Monsters	July 28, 2015	DC Entertainment	
Looney Tunes: Rabbits Run	August 4, 2015		
Batman Unlimited: Monster Mayhem	August 18, 2015	DC Entertainment	
Lego DC Comics Super Heroes: Justice League – Attack of the Legion of Doom	August 25, 2015	The Lego Group; DC Entertainment	
Batman: Bad Blood	February 2, 2016	DC Entertainment	
Lego DC Comics Super Heroes: Justice League – Cosmic Clash	March 1, 2016	The Lego Group; DC Entertainment	
Justice League vs. Teen Titans	April 12, 2016	DC Entertainment	
Lego Scooby-Doo! Haunted Hollywood	May 10, 2016	The Lego Group	
Tom and Jerry: Back to Oz	June 21, 2016	Turner Entertainment Co.	
Lego DC Comics Super Heroes: Justice League – Gotham City Breakout	July 12, 2016	The Lego Group; DC Entertainment	
Batman: The Killing Joke^{[A]}	July 23, 2016	DC Entertainment	Limited theatrical release.
Scooby-Doo! and WWE: Curse of the Speed Demon	August 9, 2016	WWE Studios	
DC Super Hero Girls: Hero of the Year	August 23, 2016	DC Entertainment	
Batman Unlimited: Mechs vs. Mutants	September 13, 2016	DC Entertainment	
Batman: Return of the Caped Crusaders	November 1, 2016	DC Entertainment	Limited theatrical release.
Justice League Dark^{[A]}	February 7, 2017	DC Entertainment	
Scooby-Doo! Shaggy's Showdown	February 14, 2017		
The Jetsons & WWE: Robo-WrestleMania!	February 28, 2017	Hanna-Barbera Cartoons; WWE Studios	
Teen Titans: The Judas Contract	April 18, 2017	DC Entertainment	
DC Super Hero Girls: Intergalactic Games	May 23, 2017	DC Entertainment	
Tom and Jerry: Willy Wonka and the Chocolate Factory	June 27, 2017	Turner Entertainment Co.	
Lego Scooby-Doo! Blowout Beach Bash	July 25, 2017	The Lego Group	
Lego DC Super Hero Girls: Brain Drain	August 8, 2017	The Lego Group; DC Entertainment	
Batman and Harley Quinn	August 15, 2017	DC Entertainment	Limited theatrical release.
Batman vs. Two-Face	October 17, 2017	DC Entertainment	
Scooby-Doo! & Batman: The Brave and the Bold	January 9, 2018	DC Entertainment	
Batman: Gotham by Gaslight^{[A]}	January 23, 2018	DC Entertainment	
Lego DC Comics Super Heroes: The Flash	February 13, 2018	The Lego Group; DC Entertainment	
Suicide Squad: Hell to Pay^{[A]}	March 27, 2018	DC Entertainment	
Batman Ninja	April 24, 2018	DC Entertainment	
Lego DC Super Hero Girls: Super-Villain High	May 1, 2018	The Lego Group; DC Entertainment	
Lego DC Comics Super Heroes: Aquaman – Rage of Atlantis	July 31, 2018	The Lego Group; DC Entertainment	
The Death of Superman	August 23, 2018	DC Entertainment	Limited theatrical release.
Scooby-Doo! and the Gourmet Ghost	September 11, 2018		
DC Super Hero Girls: Legends of Atlantis	October 2, 2018	DC Entertainment	
Reign of the Supermen	January 15, 2019	DC Entertainment	Limited theatrical release.
Scooby-Doo! and the Curse of the 13th Ghost	February 5, 2019		
Justice League vs. the Fatal Five	March 30, 2019	DC Entertainment	
Batman vs. Teenage Mutant Ninja Turtles	May 14, 2019	DC Entertainment; Nickelodeon	
Batman: Hush	July 20, 2019	DC Entertainment	
Lego DC Batman: Family Matters	August 20, 2019	The Lego Group; DC Entertainment	
Scooby-Doo! Return to Zombie Island	September 3, 2019		
Teen Titans Go! vs. Teen Titans	September 24, 2019	DC Entertainment	
Wonder Woman: Bloodlines	October 22, 2019	DC Entertainment	
2020s
Superman: Red Son	February 25, 2020	DC Entertainment	
Mortal Kombat Legends: Scorpion's Revenge^{[A]}	April 14, 2020		
Lego DC Shazam! Magic and Monsters	April 28, 2020	The Lego Group; DC Entertainment	
Justice League Dark: Apokolips War^{[A]}	May 5, 2020	DC Entertainment	
Deathstroke: Knights & Dragons: The Movie^{[A]}	August 4, 2020	DC Entertainment; Berlanti Productions; Blue Ribbon Content	The film version of Deathstroke: Knights & Dragons.
Superman: Man of Tomorrow	August 23, 2020	DC Entertainment	
Happy Halloween, Scooby-Doo!	October 6, 2020		
Batman: Death in the Family^{[A]}	October 13, 2020	DC Entertainment	
Batman: Soul of the Dragon	January 12, 2021	DC Entertainment	
Scooby-Doo! The Sword and the Scoob	February 23, 2021		
Justice Society: World War II	April 27, 2021	DC Entertainment	
Batman: The Long Halloween, Part One	June 22, 2021	DC Entertainment	
Batman: The Long Halloween, Part Two^{[A]}	July 27, 2021	DC Entertainment	
Mortal Kombat Legends: Battle of the Realms^{[A]}	August 31, 2021		
Straight Outta Nowhere: Scooby-Doo! Meets Courage the Cowardly Dog	September 14, 2021		
Injustice^{[A]}	October 19, 2021	DC Entertainment	
Tom and Jerry: Cowboy Up!	January 25, 2022	Turner Entertainment Co.	
Catwoman: Hunted	February 8, 2022	DC Entertainment	
Teen Titans Go! & DC Super Hero Girls: Mayhem in the Multiverse	May 24, 2022	DC Entertainment	
King Tweety	June 14, 2022		
Green Lantern: Beware My Power	July 26, 2022	DC Entertainment	
Trick or Treat Scooby-Doo!	October 4, 2022		
Mortal Kombat Legends: Snow Blind^{[A]}	October 11, 2022		
Batman and Superman: Battle of the Super Sons	October 18, 2022	DC Entertainment	
Tom and Jerry: Snowman's Land	November 15, 2022	Turner Entertainment Co.	
Legion of Super-Heroes	February 7, 2023	DC Entertainment	
Batman: The Doom That Came to Gotham	March 28, 2023	DC Entertainment	
Justice League x RWBY: Super Heroes & Huntsmen, Part One (Note: Ownership transferred to Viz Media as of December 6th, 2024 to present with Warner Bros. via DC retaining home media distribution only))	April 25, 2023	DC Entertainment; Rooster Teeth Productions	
Justice League: Warworld^{[A]}	July 25, 2023	DC Entertainment	
Babylon 5: The Road Home	August 15, 2023	Babylonian Productions, Inc. Studio JMS	
Scooby-Doo! and Krypto, Too!	September 26, 2023	DC Entertainment	
Mortal Kombat Legends: Cage Match^{[A]}	October 17, 2023		
Justice League x RWBY: Super Heroes & Huntsmen, Part Two	October 31, 2023	DC Entertainment; Rooster Teeth Productions	
Urkel Saves Santa: The Movie!	November 21, 2023	Miller-Boyett Productions	
Justice League: Crisis on Infinite Earths – Part One	January 9, 2024	DC Entertainment	
Justice League: Crisis on Infinite Earths – Part Two	April 23, 2024	DC Entertainment	
Justice League: Crisis on Infinite Earths – Part Three	July 16, 2024	DC Entertainment	
Watchmen: Chapter I^{[A]}	August 13, 2024	Paramount Pictures; DC Entertainment	
Watchmen: Chapter II^{[A]}	November 26, 2024	Paramount Pictures; DC Entertainment	
Batman Ninja vs. Yakuza League	March 18, 2025	Warner Bros. Japan; DC Entertainment	
Batman: Knightfall – Part 1: Knightfall^{[A]}	August 25, 2026	DC Entertainment	
Upcoming
Batman: Knightfall – Part 2: Knightquest^{[A]}	December 8, 2026	DC Entertainment	
Batman: Knightfall – Part 3: KnightsEnd^{[A]}	TBA	DC Entertainment	
The Jurassic League	TBA	DC Studios	

^{A} An adult animated production.

=== Television films ===
Title	Release date	Network	Co-production with	Notes
1990s
Superman: The Last Son of Krypton	September 6, 1996	Kids' WB	Warner Bros. Family Entertainment	Split into three episodes of Superman: The Animated Series in reruns and video releases. Series premiere.
The Batman Superman Movie: World's Finest	October 4, 1997 (original air date)	Kids' WB	Warner Bros. Family Entertainment	Split into three episodes of Superman: The Animated Series in reruns and video releases. Crossover with The New Batman Adventures.
2000s
Justice League: Secret Origins	November 17, 2001	Cartoon Network	Warner Bros. Family Entertainment	Split into three episodes of Justice League in reruns and video releases. Series premiere.
Justice League: Starcrossed	May 29, 2004	Cartoon Network	Warner Bros. Family Entertainment	Split into three episodes of Justice League in reruns and video releases. Series finale.
Teen Titans: Trouble in Tokyo	September 15, 2006	Cartoon Network	Warner Bros. Family Entertainment; DC Comics	Series finale of Teen Titans.
2020s
Teen Titans Go! See Space Jam	June 20, 2021	Cartoon Network	DC Entertainment	A commentary on Space Jam; it was made to promote Space Jam: A New Legacy.
Upcoming
Bad Karma	TBA	TBA		
Lovey Dovey	TBA	TBA		

=== Direct-to-streaming films ===
Title	Release date	Streaming	Co-production with	Notes
2020s
Taz: Quest for Burger	June 6, 2023	—N/a		
Merry Little Batman	December 8, 2023	Amazon Prime Video	Amazon MGM Studios; DC Entertainment	
Aztec Batman: Clash of Empires	September 19, 2025	HBO Max	DC Entertainment; Ánima; Chatrone; Particular Crowd	

=== Other film credits ===
Title	Release date	Services
Gremlins 2: The New Batch	June 15, 1990	Looney Tunes sequence.
Scooby-Doo	June 14, 2002	Animation services.
Eight Crazy Nights	November 27, 2002	Animation services.
Scooby-Doo 2: Monsters Unleashed	March 26, 2004	Visual effects and animation services for the Tasmanian Devil.
After the Sunset	November 12, 2004	Visual effects.
The SpongeBob SquarePants Movie	November 19, 2004	Animation services.
Fat Albert	December 25, 2004	Animation sequence.
Four Brothers	July 1, 2005	Visual effects.
The Dukes of Hazzard	August 5, 2005	Visual effects.
Rumor Has It...	December 25, 2005	Visual effects.
Curious George	February 10, 2006	Animation services.
The Astronaut Farmer	February 23, 2007	Visual effects.
Birds of Prey	February 7, 2020	Opening animation sequence.
The Suicide Squad	August 6, 2021	Opening titles.
Joker: Folie à Deux	October 4, 2024	Opening animation sequence.

== Short films ==
=== Short subjects ===
Title	Release date	Franchise	Released with	Co-production with
1980s
The Duxorcist	November 20, 1987	Looney Tunes	—N/a	
The Night of the Living Duck	September 23, 1988	Looney Tunes	Daffy Duck's Quackbusters	
1990s
Box-Office Bunny	February 11, 1991	Looney Tunes	The NeverEnding Story II: The Next Chapter	
I'm Mad	March 30, 1994	Animaniacs	Thumbelina	Warner Bros. Family Entertainment; Amblin Entertainment
Chariots of Fur	December 21, 1994	Looney Tunes	Richie Rich	Warner Bros. Family Entertainment; Chuck Jones Enterprises
Carrotblanca	August 25, 1995	Looney Tunes	The Amazing Panda Adventure (North America); The Pebble and the Penguin (Internationally)	Warner Bros. Family Entertainment
Another Froggy Evening	October 6, 1995	Looney Tunes	Limited theatrical release	Warner Bros. Family Entertainment; Chuck Jones Enterprises
Superior Duck	August 23, 1996	Looney Tunes	Carpool	Warner Bros. Family Entertainment; Chuck Jones Enterprises
Pullet Surprise	March 26, 1997	Looney Tunes	Cats Don't Dance	Warner Bros. Family Entertainment; Chuck Jones Enterprises
From Hare to Eternity	November 4, 1997	Looney Tunes	Limited theatrical release	Warner Bros. Family Entertainment; Chuck Jones Enterprises
Father of the Bird	November 14, 1997	Looney Tunes	Limited theatrical release	Warner Bros. Family Entertainment; Chuck Jones Enterprises
2000s
Little Go Beep	November 6, 2000	Looney Tunes	Limited theatrical release	
The Karate Guard	September 27, 2005	Tom and Jerry	Limited theatrical release	Turner Entertainment Co.
2010s
Coyote Falls	July 30, 2010	Looney Tunes	Cats & Dogs: The Revenge of Kitty Galore	Reel FX Creative Studios
Fur of Flying	September 24, 2010	Looney Tunes	Legend of the Guardians: The Owls of Ga'Hoole	Reel FX Creative Studios
Rabid Rider	December 17, 2010	Looney Tunes	Yogi Bear	Reel FX Creative Studios
I Tawt I Taw a Puddy Tat	November 18, 2011	Looney Tunes	Happy Feet Two	Reel FX Creative Studios
Daffy's Rhapsody	February 10, 2012	Looney Tunes	Journey 2: The Mysterious Island	Reel FX Creative Studios
Flash in the Pain	June 10, 2014	Looney Tunes	Limited theatrical release	Reel FX Creative Studios
#TheLateBatsby	July 27, 2018	DC Super Hero Girls	Teen Titans Go! To the Movies	DC Entertainment

=== Television shorts ===
Title	Release date	Franchise	Network	Co-production with	Notes
1990s
Invasion of the Bunny Snatchers	August 25, 1992	Looney Tunes	CBS		Aired as part of Bugs Bunny's Creature Features. Originally planned for theatrical release.
(Blooper) Bunny	June 13, 1997	Looney Tunes	Cartoon Network		Produced in 1991. Originally planned for theatrical release.
2010s
Snarf: Butterfly Blues	December 16, 2011	ThunderCats	Cartoon Network		
Superman 75th Anniversary	October 19, 2013	Superman	Cartoon Network	DC Entertainment	Aired as part of DC Nation Shorts.
Batman: Strange Days	April 9, 2014	Batman	Cartoon Network	DC Entertainment	Aired as part of DC Nation Shorts.
Batman Beyond	April 23, 2014	Batman	Cartoon Network	DC Entertainment	Aired as part of DC Nation Shorts.

=== Direct-to-video shorts ===
Title	Release date	Released with	Co-production with	Notes
2000s
Chase Me	October 21, 2003	Batman: Mystery of the Batwoman	Warner Bros. Family Entertainment	
Whizzard of Ow	November 1, 2003	Looney Tunes: Back in Action	Warner Bros. Family Entertainment	Originally planned for theatrical release.
Museum Scream	March 31, 2004	Looney Tunes: Back in Action (Blu-ray and Australian DVD edition only)	Warner Bros. Family Entertainment	Originally planned for theatrical release.
Hare and Loathing in Las Vegas	March 31, 2004	Looney Tunes: Back in Action (Blu-ray and Australian DVD edition only)	Warner Bros. Family Entertainment	Originally planned for theatrical release.
Attack of the Drones	March 31, 2004	Looney Tunes: Back in Action (Blu-ray and Australian DVD edition only)	Warner Bros. Family Entertainment	Originally planned for theatrical release.
Cock-A-Doodle Duel	March 31, 2004	Looney Tunes: Back in Action (Blu-ray and Australian DVD edition only)	Warner Bros. Family Entertainment	Originally planned for theatrical release.
My Generation G-G-Gap	March 31, 2004	Looney Tunes: Back in Action (Blu-ray and Australian DVD edition only)	Warner Bros. Family Entertainment	Originally planned for theatrical release.
Daffy Duck for President	November 2, 2004	Looney Tunes Golden Collection: Volume 2		Originally planned for theatrical release.
2010s
DC Showcase: The Spectre	February 23, 2010	Justice League: Crisis on Two Earths	Warner Premiere; DC Entertainment	
DC Showcase: Jonah Hex	July 27, 2010	Batman: Under the Red Hood	Warner Premiere; DC Entertainment	
DC Showcase: Green Arrow	September 28, 2010	Superman/Batman: Apocalypse	Warner Premiere; DC Entertainment	
Superman/Shazam!: The Return of Black Adam	November 9, 2010	Standalone release	Warner Premiere; DC Entertainment	
The Joker's Playhouse	2010	Standalone release	DC Entertainment; Fisher-Price	
DC Showcase: Catwoman	October 18, 2011	Batman: Year One	Warner Premiere; DC Entertainment	
Nightwing and Robin	January 27, 2015	Justice League: Throne of Atlantis	DC Entertainment	
DC Showcase: Sgt. Rock	August 6, 2019	Batman: Hush	DC Entertainment	
DC Showcase: Death	October 22, 2019	Wonder Woman: Bloodlines	DC Entertainment	
2020s
DC Showcase: The Phantom Stranger	February 25, 2020	Superman: Red Son	DC Entertainment	
DC Showcase: Adam Strange	May 19, 2020	Justice League Dark: Apokolips War	DC Entertainment	
Batman: Death in the Family	October 13, 2020	Standalone release	DC Entertainment	
DC Showcase: Kamandi: The Last Boy on Earth!	April 27, 2021	Justice Society: World War II	DC Entertainment	
DC Showcase: The Losers	June 22, 2021	Batman: The Long Halloween, Part One	DC Entertainment	
DC Showcase: Blue Beetle	July 27, 2021	Batman: The Long Halloween, Part Two	DC Entertainment	
DC Showcase: Constantine: The House of Mystery	May 3, 2022	Standalone release	DC Entertainment	

=== Theme park shorts ===
Title	Release date	Franchise
Marvin the Martian in the Third Dimension	December 26, 1997	Looney Tunes

== Specials ==
Title	Release date	Network	Co-production with	Notes
1980s
Daffy Duck's Easter Show	April 1, 1980	NBC	DePatie–Freleng Enterprises	
Bugs Bunny's Bustin' Out All Over	May 21, 1980	CBS	Chuck Jones Enterprises	
The Bugs Bunny Mystery Special	October 16, 1980	CBS		
Daffy Duck's Thanks-for-Getting Special	November 20, 1980	NBC	Chuck Jones Productions	
Bugs Bunny: All American Hero	May 21, 1981	CBS		
Bugs Bunny's Mad World of Television	January 11, 1982	CBS		Final Looney Tunes special produced by Hal Geer.
Looney Tunes 50th Anniversary	January 14, 1986	CBS	Broadway Video	
Bugs vs. Daffy: Battle of the Music Video Stars	October 21, 1988	CBS		
Bugs Bunny's Wild World of Sports	February 15, 1989	CBS		
1990s
Happy Birthday, Bugs!: 50 Looney Years	May 9, 1990	CBS		
Bugs Bunny's Overtures to Disaster	April 17, 1991	CBS		
Bugs Bunny's Creature Features	February 1, 1992	CBS		
Tiny Toon Spring Break	March 27, 1994	Fox	Warner Bros. Family Entertainment; Amblin Entertainment	
Tiny Toons' Night Ghoulery	May 28, 1995	Fox	Warner Bros. Family Entertainment; Amblin Entertainment	Series finale of Tiny Toon Adventures.
2000s
A Miser Brothers' Christmas	December 13, 2008	ABC Family	Cuppa Coffee Studios	Sequel to The Year Without a Santa Claus.
2010s
Happiness Is a Warm Blanket, Charlie Brown	March 29, 2011	Direct-to-video	Warner Premiere; Peanuts Worldwide; Wildbrain Entertainment; Schulz Productions	
Scooby-Doo! Spooky Games	July 17, 2012	Direct-to-video	Warner Premiere	
Robot Chicken DC Comics Special	September 9, 2012	Adult Swim	Stoopid Monkey; Stoopid Buddy Stoodios; DC Entertainment; Sony Pictures Television; Williams Street	
Scooby-Doo! Haunted Holidays	October 16, 2012	Direct-to-video	Warner Premiere	
Scooby-Doo! and the Spooky Scarecrow	September 10, 2013	Direct-to-video		
Scooby-Doo! Mecha Mutt Menace	September 24, 2013	Direct-to-video		
Robot Chicken DC Comics Special 2: Villains in Paradise	April 6, 2014	Adult Swim	Stoopid Monkey; Stoopid Buddy Stoodios; DC Entertainment; Sony Pictures Television; Williams Street	
Scooby-Doo! Ghastly Goals	May 13, 2014	Direct-to-video		
Tom and Jerry: Santa's Little Helpers	October 7, 2014	Direct-to-video	Turner Entertainment Co.	
Lego DC Comics: Batman Be-Leaguered	October 27, 2014	Cartoon Network	The Lego Group; DC Entertainment	
Elf: Buddy's Musical Christmas	December 16, 2014	NBC	New Line Cinema	Spin-off of Elf.
Scooby-Doo! and the Beach Beastie	May 5, 2015	Direct-to-video		
Robot Chicken DC Comics Special III: Magical Friendship	October 18, 2015	Adult Swim	Stoopid Monkey; Stoopid Buddy Stoodios; DC Entertainment; Sony Pictures Television; Williams Street	
Lego Scooby-Doo! Knight Time Terror	November 25, 2015	Cartoon Network	The Lego Group	
DC Super Hero Girls: Super Hero High	March 19, 2016	Boomerang	DC Entertainment	
Lego DC Super Hero Girls: Galactic Wonder	May 28, 2017	Cartoon Network; Boomerang	The Lego Group; DC Entertainment	
2020s
Scooby-Doo, Where Are You Now!	October 29, 2021	The CW	Abominable Pictures; Warner Horizon Unscripted Television	
Beebo Saves Christmas	December 1, 2021	The CW	DC Entertainment; Berlanti Productions	
Harley Quinn: A Very Problematic Valentine's Day Special	February 9, 2023	HBO Max	Delicious Non-Sequitur; Yes Norman, Productions; DC Entertainment	
Tiny Toons Looniversity: Spring Beak	March 8, 2024	Max; Cartoon Network	Amblin Television	
Velma: This Halloween Needs To Be More Special!	October 3, 2024	Max	Charlie Grandy Productions; Kaling International; 3 Arts Entertainment	
Tiny Toons Looniversity: Winter Blunderland	December 6, 2024	Max; Cartoon Network	Amblin Television	
Tiny Toons Looniversity: Nightmare on Toon Street	March 22, 2025	Max; Cartoon Network	Amblin Television	

=== Television pilots ===
Title	Year	Creator(s) / Developer(s)	Channel	Co-production with	Notes
1990s
The Dark Knight's First Night	1990	Bruce Timm; Eric Radomski	Fox Kids		Developmental pilot of Batman: The Animated Series.
2000s
Swaroop	2001	Mike Milo; Atul Rao	Cartoon Network		Aired as part of The Cartoon Cartoon Show.
Lucha School	2001	Eddie Mort; Lili Chin	Kids' WB		Pilot for ¡Mucha Lucha!.
Circus Peanut & Elephant Ears	2003	Andy Suriano	Cartoon Network		
Knights of Sherwood	2004	Mike Milo	Kids' WB		
Plastic Man	2006	Tom Kenny; Andy Suriano	Cartoon Network	Warner Bros. Family Entertainment; DC Comics	
Wacky Races Forever	2007	Spike Brandt; Tony Cervone	Cartoon Network		
Sprawling Complex	2008	Alexander Barrett	—N/a	Warner Bros. Creative Lab; Six Point Harness	
Looney Tunes: Laff Riot	2009		—N/a		Pilot for The Looney Tunes Show.
2010s
Let's Get Crappy	2012		Adult Swim		
Rodeoheads with Roy Rogers	—N/a	Kim Saltarski; Atul Rao; Greg van Riel	Kids' WB		Only the animatic was released online.
2020s
Wacky Races	2022	Rich Webber	Cartoon Network	Hanna-Barbera Studios Europe	Only a short pilot being completed.

=== Other television credits ===
Title	Year	Network	Services
59th Academy Awards	1987	ABC	Bugs Bunny sequence
62nd Academy Awards	1990	ABC	Bugs Bunny sequence
67th Academy Awards	1995	ABC	Bugs Bunny and Daffy Duck sequence
The Rosie O'Donnell Show	1999	Syndication	Animated sequences (with StarToons International).
A Rosie Christmas	1999	ABC	Animated sequences (with StarToons International).
Baby Blues	2000	The WB	Animation production for 8 episodes.
Sabrina: The Teenage Witch	2002	The WB	Animation for Scooby-Doo and Shaggy Rogers in the episode "Sabrina Unplugged".
Supernatural	2018	The CW	Animation for the episode "Scoobynatural".
Legends of Tomorrow	2021	The CW	Animation for the episode "The Satanist's Apprentice".
Lucifer	2021	Netflix	Animation for the episode "Yabba Dabba Do Me".

== Commercials ==
- 9Lives (1979–1980, with Duck Soup Produckions)
- Aflac (2004)
- Air Jordan
- Alpha-Bits
- American Express (1998)
- Astral Paint
- AT&T
- AutoNation (2016)
- Boomerang (2017)
- Borden
- Brach's
- Burger King (1997)
- Canon Inc.
- Cartoon Network
- Cheetos
- Chevrolet Monte Carlo (1998, 2000)
- Crush
- DEX One
- DirecTV
- Energizer (1994)
- Gatorade
- GEICO (2021)
- Golden Crisp
- Hallmark Cards (1998)
- Hershey's
- Holiday Inn
- Honey Nut Cheerios
- Honeycomb
- Jeep
- KFC
- Kith NYC (2020, with Renegade Animation)
- Kool-Aid
- Kraft Foods (1990s)
- Laffy Taffy
- Listerine
- McDonald's (1990s, 2011)
- MCI (1998–2000)
- Michelin
- Miles Laboratories
- Miracle Whip (1999)
- Nike (1992, 2015)
- Oldsmobile
- Pebbles (2000)
- Pepsi (1996, with StarToons)
- Pontiac (1998, with Industrial Light and Magic)
- Purolator Inc.
- RadioShack (1997)
- Raisin Bran
- Rocket Mortgage (2018)
- Scooby-Doo Cereal (2002–2003, with Mercury Filmworks)
- Sedex
- Shell Oil Company
- Shriners Hospitals for Children
- Six Flags Parks
- Sony
- Spectrum
- Sprint (1998)
- State Farm (2013)
- Subway
- Target (1996)
- Toyota
- TriNa
- Trix
- Tyco Toys
- Tyson Foods
- Visa (1996, with USAnimation)
- Walkers
- Warner Bros. Family Entertainment (1993)
- Warner Bros. Catalog (1989)
- Warner Village Cinemas
- The WB (1995–1998)
- Weetabix
- Wendy's
- Westfield Corporation
- Ziploc

== See also ==
- Warner Bros. Cartoons
  - List of Warner Bros. Cartoons productions
- Warner Bros. Pictures Animation
  - List of Warner Bros. Pictures Animation productions
- Cartoon Network Studios
  - List of Cartoon Network Studios productions
- Looney Tunes and Merrie Melodies filmography
- List of Warner Bros. theatrical animated features
- List of unproduced Warner Bros. Animation projects
