= Tom and Jerry: Santa's Little Helpers =

- DVD cover
- Directed by: Darrell Van Citters
- Written by: Jim Praytor; Robert Zappia
- Based on: Tom and Jerry by: William Hanna; Joseph Barbera
- Starring: William Hanna (archive recording; uncredited); Rich Danhakl (uncredited); Nickie Bryar; Mark Hamill; Edie McClurg; Kath Soucie; Rick Zieff; Eric Bauza; Tom Kenny
- Edited by: Michael D'Ambrosio
- Music by: David Ricard; John Van Tongeren
- Animation by: Renegade Animation
- Production companies: Turner Entertainment Co. Warner Bros. Animation
- Distributed by: Warner Bros. Television Distribution (TV broadcast); Warner Home Video (home media)
- Release date: October 7, 2014
- Running time: 22 minutes
- Country: United States
- Language: English

Tom and Jerry: Santa's Little Helpers is a 2014 American animated direct-to-DVD special starring Tom and Jerry and the Christmas special of The Tom and Jerry Show, produced by Warner Bros. Animation. It was made available as part of a 2-disc DVD set of the same name, which also contains 29 other Tom and Jerry cartoons and episodes from Tom and Jerry Tales, on October 7, 2014.

On August 13, 2020, it was announced that the special would be released on Blu-ray as paired with Tom and Jerry: A Nutcracker Tale on October 27, 2020.

== Plot ==
Jerry and Tuffy are living the good life in Santa's workshop up until the day on which Tom is rescued by the Claus family. With Tom in the house, merry mayhem ensues at the North Pole, but when the dust settles, the destructive trio now has to work together to save a little dog named Jingles and learn the true meaning of giving and friendship.

== Voice cast ==
- William Hanna as Tom & Jerry (archive audio and uncredited)
- Rich Danhakl as Tom & Jerry (uncredited)
- Kath Soucie as Tuffy
- Nickie Bryar as Cindy
- Mark Hamill as Santa
- Edie McClurg as Mrs. Clause
- Rick Zieff as Devil & Angel Tom

=== Additional voices ===
- Eric Bauza
- Tom Kenny

== See also ==
- List of Christmas films
- Santa Claus in film
