= Will Finn =

American animator and director

- Education: Art Institute of Pittsburgh
- Occupations: Animator, film director, storyboard artist, voice actor
- Years active: 1974–present

Will Finn is an American animator, voice actor, storyboard artist, and director.

== Career ==
His work in animation includes characters from Disney, Warner Bros., DreamWorks, and Don Bluth films such as The Secret of NIMH, Oliver & Company, The Little Mermaid, The Rescuers Down Under, and Pocahontas. Finn animated such characters as Cogsworth in Beauty and the Beast, Iago in Aladdin, and Laverne in The Hunchback of Notre Dame. Finn wrote and directed Home on the Range and voiced the character of Hollywood Fish in Chicken Little. In 2006, Finn directed the animated short Hammy's Boomerang Adventure, a spin-off of Over the Hedge.

== Filmography ==
Year	Title	Credits	Characters
1979	Banjo the Woodpile Cat (TV Short)	Special Thanks	
1982	The Secret of NIMH	Animator / Story Adaptation	
1983	Dragon's Lair (Video Game)	Animator	
1984	Space Ace (Video Game)	Voice / Animator	Dexter (voice)
1987	Sport Goofy in Soccermania (Short)	Animator	
1987	Pinocchio and the Emperor of the Night	Animator	
1988	Oliver & Company	Character Animator	
1988–1989	Slimer! And the Real Ghostbusters (TV Series)	Storyboard Artist - 33 Episodes	
1989	The Little Mermaid	Character Animator	
1990	Happily Ever After	Model Designer / Storyboard Artist / Animator	
1990	Tiny Toon Adventures (TV Series)	Storyboard Artist - 3 Episodes / Model Designer - 4 Episodes	
1990	The Rescuers Down Under	Storyboard Artist / Character Animator	
1991	Dragon's Lair II: Time Warp (Video Game)	Voice / Animator	Gatekeeper (Voice)
1991	Beauty and the Beast	Supervising Animator	Cogsworth
1992	Aladdin	Supervising Animator	Iago
1994	The Return of Jafar (Video)	Storyboard	
1994	Aladdin (TV Series)	Character Designer - 1 Episode	
1994	Chariots of Fur (Short)	Animator	
1995	A Goofy Movie	Character Designer	
1995	Pocahontas	Visual Development / Character Designer / Additional Story Development	
1995	Carrotblanca (Short)	Character Animator	
1996	The Hunchback of Notre Dame	Head of Story / Additional Screenplay Material / Supervising Animator	Laverne
1996	Quack Pack (TV Series)	Supervising Animator - 1 Episode	
1997	Pullet Surprise (Short)	Additional Animator	
2000	The Road to El Dorado	Additional Sequences	
2001	Clerks (TV Series)	Storyboard Revisionist - 1 Episode	
2004	Home on the Range	Written & Directed By / Story	
2004	A Dairy Tale (Video short)	Director	
2004-2005	Hi Hi Puffy AmiYumi (TV Series)	Storyboard Artist - 4 Episodes	
2004-2005	Chicken Little	Voice	Hollywood Fish (voice)
2006	Over the Hedge	Storyboard Artist	
2006	Hammy's Boomerang Adventure (Video short)	Director	
2006	My Life as a Teenage Robot (TV Series)	Written by - 2 Episodes	
2006–2007	My Life as a Teenage Robot (TV Series)	Storyboard Artist - 2 Episodes	
2007	Shrek the Halls (TV Short)	Additional Story Artist	
2008	Sita Sings the Blues	Donor	
2008	Madagascar: Escape 2 Africa	Additional Story Artist	
2009	Astro Boy	Storyboard Artist	
2010	Tinker Bell and the Great Fairy Rescue (Video)	Additional Story Artist	
2011	YooHoo & Friends (TV Series)	Storyboard Artist - 3 Episodes	
2011	The Looney Tunes Show (TV Series)	Storyboard Artist - 3 Episodes	
2011	Kung Fu Panda: Secrets of the Masters (Video short)	Additional Animator: Duncan Studio Production	
2013	Legends of Oz: Dorothy's Return	Director	
2013	Free Birds	Storyboard Artist	
2016	The Angry Birds Movie	Additional Story Artist	
2016	It's Your Birthday (Short)	Animated & Directed by	
2016–2017	The Tom and Jerry Show (TV Series)	Storyboard Artist - 3 Episodes / Story - 1 Episode	
2017	Rock Dog	Voice / Storyboard Artist / Additional Story Material	Floyd / Carl (Voice)
2018	Animal Crackers	Storyboard Artist	
2021	Tom and Jerry in New York	Story - 13 Episodes	
2022	Tom and Jerry: Cowboy Up!	Story	
2022	Paws of Fury: The Legend of Hank	Storyboard Artist	
2023	Once Upon a Studio (Short)	Animator	

== Awards ==
- In 2005, Finn received a nomination with John Sanford for Directing in an Animated Feature Production Annie Award for Home on the Range.
- In 2013, Finn received a nomination with Daniel St. Pierre for Best Feature Cristal Award at the Annecy International Animated Film Festival for Legends of Oz: Dorothy's Return
