= Tom and Jerry: Snowman's Land =

2022 cartoon film

- DVD cover
- Directed by: Darrell Van Citters
- Screenplay by: Jase Ricci
- Story by: Will Finn; Jase Ricci
- Based on: Tom and Jerry by: William Hanna; Joseph Barbera
- Produced by: Ashley Postlewaite; Kimberly S. Moreau; Darrell Van Citters
- Starring: Kevin Michael Richardson; Kath Soucie
- Edited by: Michael D'Ambrosio
- Music by: Vivek Maddala
- Animation by: Renegade Animation; Slap Happy Cartoons
- Production companies: Turner Entertainment Co. Warner Bros. Animation
- Distributed by: Warner Bros. Home Entertainment (Studio Distribution Services)
- Release dates: November 15, 2022 (Digital); November 29, 2022 (DVD)
- Running time: 76 minutes
- Language: English

Tom and Jerry: Snowman's Land is a 2022 American animated Christmas direct-to-video film starring Tom and Jerry. The film is produced by Warner Bros. Animation and Turner Entertainment Co. and animated by Renegade Animation in the United States and Slap Happy Cartoons Inc. in Canada. It was released digitally on November 15, 2022 and was later released on DVD on November 29, 2022 by Warner Bros. Home Entertainment (through Studio Distribution Services).

== Plot ==
In the town of Goodberry, Tom and Jerry mess with each other in the snow until Tom gets in trouble with his master, Dr. Doublevay. Jerry goes to his owner, Mrs. LePage. It is revealed that not only are Jerry and Mrs. LePage against Tom and Dr. Doublevay, but they are also poor and are trying to earn money by selling snowmice to little kids. Jerry's nappy-wearing nephew, Tuffy has other plans. He wants to perform a magic show, but Jerry disagrees.

Disappointed, Tuffy goes outside and decides he will build a snowmouse to help Jerry and Mrs. LePage, but when he's done, he regrets the idea. The snowmouse then miraculously comes to life and he and Tuffy become the best of friends. Tuffy introduces the snowmouse to Jerry and names him Larry, but Jerry is not pleased. However, he agrees to let him stay.

He then is surprised to find out Larry is a big help when he helps Mrs. LePage get her money for her bank sell after Tom ruins it. After a while, Larry starts to melt. To keep their new friend from melting, Tuffy and Jerry must bring him to the fabled Snowman's Village, but Tom and Dr. Doublevay have their own plans and follow them throughout the journey. Tom later has a change of heart when Jerry and Larry save him from a trap they put him and Dr. Doublevay in. When the mice get to the Snowman's Village, Tom saves them and the four work together to defeat Doublevay. In return, Tom moves in with Tuffy, Jerry, and Mrs. LePage as their new friend and joins them as they celebrate every time Larry comes to visit them.

== Cast ==
- William Hanna (archival audio recordings) as Tom Cat and Jerry Mouse (uncredited)
- Kath Soucie as Tuffy
- Kevin Michael Richardson as Larry
- Laraine Newman as Mrs. LePage
- Stephen Stanton as Dr. Doublevay and Lightning
- Rick Zieff as Meathead Cat and Narrator
- Carlos Alazraqui as Floyd
- Kimberly Brooks as Snow Cop and Little Girl
- Joey D'Auria as Butch Cat
- Regi Davis as Snow Mayor

== Reception ==
Jennifer Borget of Common Sense Media gave the film 3 out of 5 stars, saying "Though the cat and mouse aren't at each other's throats for the entirety of the movie, there's still plenty of silly slapstick violence and humor that those familiar with the franchise will expect... The story is nothing new, but it's cute enough, and it's less violent than some previous Tom and Jerry films." Dillon Gonzales, writing for Geek Vibes Nation, gave the film a review saying "Tom & Jerry: Snowman’s Land is a pretty enjoyable entry from the long-running duo which feels right at home during this time of the year... If you want a lighthearted tale to get you into the holiday spirit, you could do worse."

== See also ==
- The Tom and Jerry Show (2014–2021) – reboot series by Renegade Animation
- Tom and Jerry in New York (2021) – reboot series by Renegade Animation
- Tom and Jerry: Cowboy Up! (2022) – reboot movie by Renegade Animation
