= Sam Register =

American television producer (born 1969)

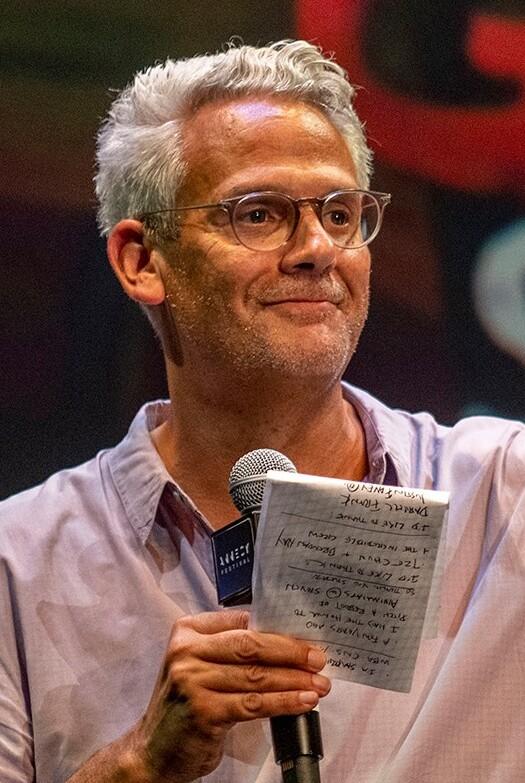
- Register in 2022
- Born: June 16, 1969 (age 57); New York, United States
- Occupations: Film producer; television producer; businessman
- Years active: 1998–present
- Known for: Hi Hi Puffy AmiYumi; Transformers: Animated; Ben 10; DC Super Hero Girls; Tom and Jerry

Sam Register (born June 16, 1969) is an American film and television producer who served as president of Warner Bros. Animation, Cartoon Network Studios, and Hanna-Barbera Studios Europe from 2020 to 2026.

== Career ==
Register began his career directing toy commercials. By 1998, he was a creative director in Colossal Pictures. In 1998, Register led the launch of CartoonNetwork.com and Cartoon Orbit in 2000, serving as the latter's creative director between 2000 and 2001.

Register was the creator of Hi Hi Puffy AmiYumi and was one of the developers of The Looney Tunes Show alongside Warner Bros. Animation veterans Spike Brandt and Tony Cervone, and served as executive producer of Teen Titans and Ben 10. He also served as executive producer for Transformers: Animated, based on the popular Transformers franchise, and Ben 10: Alien Force. Register became the executive producer of Scooby-Doo! Mystery Incorporated, Teen Titans Go!, Mike Tyson Mysteries, and Unikitty!.

The fictional character Dr. Samuel Register from the Teen Titans comics was named after Sam Register. On August 28, 2020, he officially became the president of both Warner Bros. Animation and Cartoon Network Studios. As head of the studios, Register oversaw executive production for the HBO Max original series Looney Tunes Cartoons and Jellystone! as well as Adult Swim original series Primal and Unicorn: Warriors Eternal (both created by Genndy Tartakovsky). He also served as an executive producer for films like Teen Titans Go! To the Movies and the 2021 live-action/animated Tom and Jerry hybrid movie.

In August 2026, it was announced that Register would be leaving his position as head of Warner Bros. Animation, Cartoon Network Studios and Hanna-Barbera Studios Europe following a mutual decision with Warner Bros. Television Studios not to renew his contract. During the later years of his presidency, Register was credited with expanding the studios' business models by pitching and selling new animated properties to outside streaming platforms rather than solely maintaining a pipeline to Warner Bros. Discovery networks. Upon his departure, Warner Bros. TV Group Chair Channing Dungey praised his "enormous contributions" across his 18-year tenure leading the studios' animation efforts. Reflecting on his exit, Register stated, "It's been an amazing ride and I want to extend my sincere thanks to all the great people I've worked with — we've built some incredible things together."

== Filmography ==
=== Film ===
| Year | Film | Role | Notes |
|---|---|---|---|
| 2001 | Web Premiere Toons: Journey to the Center of My Dog's Head | Executive producer | |
| 2001 | Web Premiere Toons: Evil Awards | Executive producer | |
| 2001 | Web Premiere Toons: Captain Distraction | Executive producer | |
| 2002 | Wendell and Wuggums in the Creep Next Door | Executive producer | |
| 2002 | Wendell and Wuggums in Game Over | Executive producer | |
| 2005 | The Karate Guard | Executive producer | |
| 2007 | Ben 10: Secret of the Omnitrix | Executive producer | |
| 2007 | Ben 10: Race Against Time | Executive producer | |
| 2009 | Wonder Woman | Executive producer | |
| 2009 | Green Lantern: First Flight | Executive producer | |
| 2009 | Superman/Batman: Public Enemies | Executive producer | |
| 2010 | Scooby-Doo! Abracadabra-Doo | Executive producer | |
| 2010 | Justice League: Crisis on Two Earths | Executive producer | |
| 2010 | Tom and Jerry Meet Sherlock Holmes | Executive producer | |
| 2010 | Scooby-Doo! Camp Scare | Executive producer | |
| 2011 | Tom and Jerry and the Wizard of Oz | Executive producer | |
| 2011 | Scooby-Doo! Legend of the Phantosaur | Executive producer | |
| 2011 | I Tawt I Taw a Puddy Tat | Executive producer | |
| 2012 | Scooby-Doo! Music of the Vampire | Executive producer | |
| 2012 | Daffy's Rhapsody | Executive producer | |
| 2012 | Tom and Jerry: Robin Hood and His Merry Mouse | Executive producer | |
| 2012 | Big Top Scooby-Doo! | Executive producer | |
| 2013 | Scooby-Doo! Mask of the Blue Falcon | Executive producer | |
| 2013 | Tom and Jerry's Giant Adventure | Executive producer | |
| 2013 | Scooby-Doo! Stage Fright | Executive producer | |
| 2014 | Scooby-Doo! WrestleMania Mystery | Executive producer | |
| 2014 | Tom and Jerry: The Lost Dragon | Executive producer | |
| 2014 | Scooby-Doo! Frankencreepy | Executive producer | |
| 2015 | Scooby-Doo! Moon Monster Madness | Executive producer | |
| 2015 | The Flintstones & WWE: Stone Age SmackDown! | Executive producer | |
| 2015 | Tom and Jerry: Spy Quest | Executive producer | |
| 2015 | Looney Tunes: Rabbits Run | Executive producer | |
| 2015 | Scooby-Doo! and Kiss: Rock and Roll Mystery | Executive producer | |
| 2016 | Scooby-Doo! and WWE: Curse of the Speed Demon | Executive producer | |
| 2016 | Tom and Jerry: Back to Oz | Executive producer | |
| 2017 | Scooby-Doo! Shaggy's Showdown | Executive producer | |
| 2017 | The Jetsons & WWE: Robo-WrestleMania! | Executive producer | |
| 2017 | Tom and Jerry: Willy Wonka and the Chocolate Factory | Executive producer | |
| 2018 | Scooby-Doo! & Batman: The Brave and the Bold | Executive producer | |
| 2018 | Teen Titans Go! To the Movies | Executive producer | |
| 2018 | Scooby-Doo! and the Gourmet Ghost | Executive producer | |
| 2019 | Scooby-Doo! and the Curse of the 13th Ghost | Executive producer | |
| 2019 | DC Super Hero Girls: Sweet Justice | Executive producer | |
| 2019 | Batman vs. Teenage Mutant Ninja Turtles | Executive producer | |
| 2019 | Teen Titans Go! vs. Teen Titans | Executive producer | |
| 2019 | Scooby-Doo! Return to Zombie Island | Executive producer | |
| 2020 | Mortal Kombat Legends: Scorpion's Revenge | Executive producer | |
| 2020 | Happy Halloween, Scooby-Doo! | Executive producer | |
| 2021 | Batman: Soul of the Dragon | Executive producer | |
| 2021 | Tom & Jerry | Executive producer | |
| 2021 | Scooby-Doo! The Sword and the Scoob | Executive producer | |
| 2021 | Justice Society: World War II | Executive producer | |
| 2021 | Batman: The Long Halloween | Executive producer | |
| 2021 | Mortal Kombat Legends: Battle of the Realms | Executive producer | |
| 2021 | Straight Outta Nowhere: Scooby-Doo! Meets Courage the Cowardly Dog | Executive producer | |
| 2022 | Tom and Jerry: Cowboy Up! | Executive producer | |
| 2022 | Catwoman: Hunted | Executive producer | |
| 2022 | Teen Titans Go! & DC Super Hero Girls: Mayhem in the Multiverse | Executive producer | |
| 2022 | King Tweety | Executive producer | |
| 2022 | Green Lantern: Beware My Power | Executive producer | |
| 2022 | Trick or Treat Scooby-Doo! | Executive producer | |
| 2022 | Mortal Kombat Legends: Snow Blind | Executive producer | |
| 2022 | Batman and Superman: Battle of the Super Sons | Executive producer | |
| 2022 | Tom and Jerry: Snowman's Land | Executive producer | |
| 2023 | Legion of Super-Heroes | Executive producer | |
| 2023 | Batman: The Doom That Came to Gotham | Executive producer | |
| 2023 | Justice League x RWBY: Super Heroes & Huntsmen | Executive producer | |
| 2023 | Justice League: Warworld | Executive producer | |
| 2023 | Babylon 5: The Road Home | Executive producer | |
| 2023 | Scooby-Doo! and Krypto, Too! | Executive producer | |
| 2023 | Mortal Kombat Legends: Cage Match | Executive producer | |
| 2023 | Urkel Saves Santa: The Movie! | Executive producer | |
| 2023 | Merry Little Batman | Executive producer | |
| 2023 | Craig Before the Creek | Executive producer | |
| 2024 | Justice League: Crisis on Infinite Earths | Executive producer | |
| 2024 | The Day the Earth Blew Up | Executive producer | |
| 2024 | Watchmen | Executive producer | |
| 2024 | The Lord of the Rings: The War of the Rohirrim | Executive producer | |
| 2025 | Batman Ninja vs. Yakuza League | Executive producer | |
| 2025 | Aztec Batman: Clash of Empires | Executive producer | |
| 2026 | Batman: Knightfall | Executive producer | |

=== Television ===
| Years | Show | Role | Notes |
|---|---|---|---|
| 2003–2006 | Teen Titans | Developer, executive in charge of production | |
| 2004–2006 | Hi Hi Puffy AmiYumi | Series creator, executive producer | |
| 2004–2006 | Justice League Unlimited | Executive in charge of production | |
| 2005–2008 | Ben 10 | Executive producer | |
| 2007–2009 | Transformers: Animated | Executive producer | |
| 2008–2010 | Ben 10: Alien Force | Executive producer | |
| 2008–2011 | Batman: The Brave and the Bold | Executive producer | |
| 2009 | G.I. Joe: Resolute | Executive producer | |
| 2010–2013 | Scooby-Doo! Mystery Incorporated | Executive producer | |
| 2010–2013 | MAD | Executive producer | |
| 2010–2022 | Young Justice | Executive producer | |
| 2011–2014 | The Looney Tunes Show | Executive producer | |
| 2011–2012 | ThunderCats | Executive producer | |
| 2012–2013 | Green Lantern: The Animated Series | Executive producer | |
| 2013–present | Teen Titans Go! | Executive producer | |
| 2013–2014 | Beware the Batman | Executive producer | |
| 2014–2021 | The Tom and Jerry Show | Executive producer | |
| 2014–2020 | Mike Tyson Mysteries | Executive producer | |
| 2015–2020 | New Looney Tunes | Executive producer | |
| 2015–2018 | Be Cool, Scooby-Doo! | Executive producer | |
| 2016–2017 | Right Now Kapow | Executive producer | |
| 2016–2018 | Bunnicula | Executive producer | |
| 2016–2018 | Justice League Action | Executive producer | |
| 2016–2021 | Ben 10 | Executive producer | |
| 2017–2020 | Dorothy and the Wizard of Oz | Executive producer | |
| 2017–2020 | Unikitty! | Executive producer | |
| 2017–2019 | Wacky Races | Executive producer | |
| 2019–2021 | DC Super Hero Girls | Executive producer | |
| 2019–2021 | Scooby-Doo and Guess Who? | Executive producer | |
| 2019–2022 | Green Eggs and Ham | Executive producer | |
| 2019–2025 | Harley Quinn | Executive producer | |
| 2020 | ThunderCats Roar | Executive producer | |
| 2020–2024 | Looney Tunes Cartoons | Executive producer | |
| 2020–2023 | Animaniacs | Executive producer | |
| 2021 | Tom and Jerry Special Shorts | Executive producer | |
| 2021 | Elliott from Earth | Executive producer | |
| 2021 | The Fungies! | Executive producer | |
| 2021 | Adventure Time: Distant Lands | Executive producer | |
| 2021 | Aquaman: King of Atlantis | Executive producer | |
| 2021 | Apple & Onion | Executive producer | |
| 2021 | Tom and Jerry in New York | Executive producer | |
| 2021–2025 | Craig of the Creek | Executive producer | |
| 2021–2025 | Jellystone! | Executive producer | |
| 2021–2022 | Victor and Valentino | Executive producer | |
| 2021–2022 | Little Ellen | Executive producer | |
| 2021–2022 | Tig n' Seek | Executive producer | |
| 2021–2022 | Yabba Dabba Dinosaurs | Executive producer | |
| 2021–2023 | Summer Camp Island | Executive producer | |
| 2022 | Close Enough | Executive producer | |
| 2022–present | We Baby Bears | Executive producer | |
| 2022–present | Primal | Executive producer | |
| 2022–present | Batwheels | Executive producer | |
| 2022–2025 | Bugs Bunny Builders | Executive producer | |
| 2023 | Tom and Jerry Singapore | Executive producer | |
| 2023 | Unicorn: Warriors Eternal | Executive producer | |
| 2023–2025 | Gremlins | Executive producer | |
| 2023–2025 | Tiny Toons Looniversity | Executive producer | |
| 2023–2026 | My Adventures with Superman | Executive producer | |
| 2023–2026 | Adventure Time: Fionna and Cake | Executive producer | |
| 2023–2024 | Velma | Executive producer | |
| 2024 | Kite Man: Hell Yeah! | Executive producer | |
| 2024 | Invincible Fight Girl | Executive producer | |
| 2024-2026 | Batman: Caped Crusader | Executive producer | |
| 2024-2026 | Creature Commandos | Executive producer | |
| 2025–2026 | The Wonderfully Weird World of Gumball | Executive producer | |
| 2025–2026 | Bat-Fam | Executive producer | |
| 2025–present | Krypto Saves the Day! | Executive producer | |
| 2026–present | Regular Show: The Lost Tapes | Executive producer | |
| 2026–present | Adventure Time: Side Quests | Executive producer | |
| 2026–present | Get Jiro | Executive producer | |
