= Tom and Jerry: Cowboy Up! =

- DVD cover
- Directed by: Darrell Van Citters
- Screenplay by: William Waldner
- Story by: Will Finn
- Based on: Tom and Jerry by: William Hanna; Joseph Barbera
- Produced by: Ashley Postlewaite; Kimberly S. Moreau; Darrell Van Citters
- Starring: Chris Edgerly; Justin Michael; Kaitlyn Robrock
- Edited by: Michael D'Ambrosio
- Music by: Vivek Maddala
- Animation by: Renegade Animation; Slap Happy Cartoons
- Production companies: Turner Entertainment Co. Warner Bros. Animation
- Distributed by: Warner Bros. Home Entertainment
- Release date: January 25, 2022
- Running time: 71 minutes
- Country: United States
- Language: English

Tom and Jerry: Cowboy Up! is a 2022 American animated direct-to-video Western comedy film starring Tom and Jerry, produced by Warner Bros. Animation. It is the first Tom and Jerry direct-to-video animated film in five years since 2017's Tom and Jerry: Willy Wonka and the Chocolate Factory, and a continuation of the film series. It is also the first Tom and Jerry direct-to-video animated film to feature the animation services of Renegade Animation, the studio that animated The Tom and Jerry Show (2014–21) and Tom and Jerry in New York (2021), and Slap Happy Cartoons in Canada. It was released to DVD and digital in the United States and Canada on January 25, 2022.

An animated Christmas film called Tom and Jerry: Snowman's Land was released later that year in November 2022.

== Plot ==
In 1882, in the outskirts of a typical Old Western town, an elderly prairie dog is narrating a story. He is disturbed by a slovenly and obese man named Clem, who admits to hating prairie dogs and attempts to harass the spotted one, without success. One of the attempts results in Clem getting kicked by a horse, which causes him to land on a cactus. When Clem gets stuck into a hole, prairie dogs loot him and take his possessions into their town, then they hold a party.

Shortly afterwards, a landscape of a ranch is shown. Longhorn-breed cows are grazing until a red bird damages the corral fence, setting the cattle free. Jerry Mouse and his nephews, Tuffy, Scruffy, and Duffy, are sleeping inside leather knife scabbards, prepared with wool. Jerry wakes up first and notices a cow's eye peeking through the mousehole. He forcibly shuts the eye, walks outdoors and mounts himself on the cow, which dared to disturb him. Using his mount as a bulldozer, Jerry rounds up the bovine back to their corral. At the same time, Bumpy and a grayish she-cat walks by. When the old man complains about the corral being damaged by the cattle, Jerry yells in fear and runs away, but the she-cat grabs him. It turns out to be a play, as Jerry and the cat cuddle each other. The old man returns to the house for breakfast, where the female owner of the ranch is making the meals for Bumpy and the animals. Jerry's nephews are shown to have an exceptional appetite, as they break the wall and take over most of the egg-and-bacon muffins Betty has cooked. Despite very little is left to eat for non-mice, nobody complains. Even Betty isn't upset that Jerry's nephews jump into her coffee mug.

It turns out that Betty, the ranch owner, is awaiting her brother Bentley to come to the family site. At the same time, August Critchley is planning to take over the ranch as he's expanding his zone of control in the area. So far, only Betty's and Bentley's ranch (the Double B Ranch) are the sole enclave outside his power and Critchley openly desires the land for himself. Clem turns out to be Critchley's henchman, who carries out the plan to undermine the ranch with prairie dogs digging tunnels beneath it. Multiple scarecrows planted around the prairie dog tunnels are to scare the animals off and move them towards the Double B Ranch, so it could be bought for lowered price.

Later on, Bentley arrives on a horse cart with his cat Tom, who seems bored by the trip. While Bumpy is admiring Bentley's smart-looking outfit, Tom wakes up and spots the ranch she-cat. He immediately falls in love with her, despite the female ignoring Tom. While his owner shares the experiences involving big city life as railroad clerk, Tom attempts to impress the she-cat by a lasso trick, lashing the rope to make "Howdy" sign. The trick eventually fails, as Tom entangles himself. The second attempt goes even worse, when Tom's lasso catches the windmill and takes him away. The she-cat gives him a bored gaze and returns to licking herself. During the family reunion, Bentley is boasting about his work at the railroad, then he explains he returned to have break from the work at his family site. Suddenly, Tuffy, Scruffy, Duffy, and Jerry pop out of their holes and knock over Tom. Tom starts chasing the mice with Jerry and the she-cat holding his tail. Bentley notices the mice and gets scared. It is revealed the that he fears mice.

Tom tries to catch the mice again, but they outsmart him each time. At one point, Tom gets stuck in a bull pen and bull chases him. Feeling concerned, Jerry saves Tom and in turn, Tom befriends the mice and promises to help them fix up the ranch.

By the end, Critchley and Clem are defeated by Tom, the family finds gold, and soon recreate their ranch with the prairie dogs. Jerry decides to live with the prairie dogs, and he and one of the prairie dogs wave at a train Tom, Scruffy, Tuffy, Bentley, and Duffy are in, carrying their gold.

== Cast ==
- William Hanna (archival audio recordings) as Tom Cat and Jerry Mouse (uncredited)
- George Ackles as The Marshal
- Sean Burgos as Bumpy
- Trevor Devall as Duke
- Chris Edgerly as August Critchley
- Georgie Kidder as Scruffy
- Justin Michael as Bentley
- Kaitlyn Robrock as Betty
- Isaac Robinson-Smith as Zeb
- Kath Soucie as Tuffy
- Stephen Stanton as Virgil
- Fred Tatasciore as Clem
- Kari Wahlgren as Duffy and Jane

== Release ==
The movie was released on DVD and Digital by Warner Bros. Home Entertainment (through Studio Distribution Services) in the United States and Canada on January 25, 2022. Nearly five months later, its television premiere premiered on Cartoon Network on June 18, 2022, at 6pm Eastern/5pm Central, and then streamed on HBO Max the next day.

== Follow-up film ==
An animated Christmas film called Tom and Jerry: Snowman's Land was released later that year in November 2022.

== See also ==
- The Tom and Jerry Show (2014–2021) – reboot series by Renegade Animation
- Tom and Jerry in New York (2021) – reboot series by Renegade Animation
- Tom and Jerry: Snowman's Land (2022) – reboot movie by Renegade Animation
