= Fun with Mr. Future =

- Directed by: Darrell Van Citters
- Written by: Michael Giaimo; Ed Gombert; Joe Ranft; Darrell Van Citters
- Starring: Phil Proctor
- Production company: Walt Disney Productions
- Distributed by: Buena Vista Distribution
- Release dates: October 27, 1982 (Los Angeles, California)
- Running time: 8 minutes
- Country: United States
- Language: English

Fun with Mr. Future is a 1982 live-action/animated short film from Walt Disney Productions directed by Darrell Van Citters.

== Plot ==
An audio-animatronic talking-head replica of Abraham Lincoln (voiced by Phil Proctor) hosts a tour of what the future will look like via retro-style animation.

== Production ==
Fun with Mr. Future originally began development as an Epcot television special, whose crew included Darrell Van Citters, Mike Giamo, Joe Ranft, Mike Gabriel, Tad Stones, and Brian McEntee. At the time, this team was also involved in the development stages of what would become Sport Goofy in Soccermania (1987) and Who Framed Roger Rabbit (1988). After Disney shelved the Epcot special, Tom Wilhite allowed them to use footage from the project and edit it into a new animated short. The resulting work marked the directorial debut of animator Darrell Van Citters, who began his career at the Disney studios.

== Release ==
Disney released the film in Los Angeles on October 27, 1982. No other public screenings took place until October 2010, when New York's Museum of Modern Art featured it in a program commemorating the publication of John Canemaker's book, Two Guys Named Joe. According to Tad Stones: "[Working on it] was a lot of fun but I couldn't even tell you where you find it now. It's one of those gems even Disney doesn't know it has. I went to a comic convention and was surprised to see its cels for sale".

== See also ==
- List of Disney animated shorts
- "There's A Great Big Beautiful Tomorrow" - sung at the end of the film
- The Jetsons
