= Tom and Jerry in New York =

2021 animated television series

- Genre: Comedy; Slapstick
- Based on: Tom and Jerry by: William Hanna; Joseph Barbera
- Developed by: Darrell Van Citters
- Directed by: Darrell Van Citters
- Voices of: William Hanna; Joey D'Auria; Rick Zieff; Sam Kwasman
- Theme music composer: Scott Bradley
- Composers: Keith Baxter; Greg Sims; Dan Blessinger; Jim Covell; Itamar Ben Zimra; Robert F. Hughes
- Country of origin: United States
- Original language: English
- No. of seasons: 2
- No. of episodes: 13 (52 segments)

Production
- Executive producer: Sam Register
- Producers: Ashley Postlewaite; Darrell Van Citters; Kimberly S. Moreau
- Running time: 20–21 minutes (2–5 minutes per segment)
- Production companies: Turner Entertainment Co.; Renegade Animation; Warner Bros. Animation

Original release
- Network: HBO Max
- Release: July 1 – November 18, 2021

Related
- Tom and Jerry Special Shorts (2021)

Tom and Jerry in New York is an American animated television series that premiered on HBO Max on July 1, 2021, and ended on November 18. It is based on the Tom and Jerry characters and theatrical cartoon series created by William Hanna and Joseph Barbera, is a sequel series to the film Tom & Jerry (2021), and animated by Renegade Animation and Slap Happy Cartoons.

With episodes directed by Darrell Van Citters, the show has the same art style as The Tom and Jerry Show (2014–21) with the original crew returning along with William Hanna (via archive recordings) as the voices of Tom and Jerry.

Each episode consists of four segments: the first, second, and fourth segments are 5–6 minutes long, and the third segment runs 4 minutes. It features the voices of Joey D'Auria, Rick Zieff and Sam Kwasman.

An animated Western film called Tom and Jerry: Cowboy Up! (also directed by Darrell Van Citters) was released later that year in January 2022.

== Plot ==
Set after the events of the 2021 film, the series follows Tom and Jerry having new adventures in the Royal Gate Hotel and all over New York City.

== Voice cast ==
- William Hanna (voice recordings) as:
  - Tom Cat, variously depicted as an adult blue/gray house cat doing his job, and a victim of Jerry's blackmail attempts, sometimes within the same short. (Note: As with Tom and Jerry Special Shorts (2021) and other Tom and Jerry television series, Hanna's voice is archived following his death. He also isn't credited for his performance.)
  - Jerry Mouse, a young brown mouse who lives in the same house as Tom's owners, allowing chaos and destruction to ensue while he and Tom fight.
- Tuffy Mouse: The little, gray, nappy-wearing orphan mouse who is Jerry's ward. He has no speaking roles in the series.
- Joey D'Auria as Butch Cat: A black alley cat who is the leader of the alley cat bullies who are usually friends with Tom and help him catch Jerry.
- Rick Zieff as Spike: A muscular gray bulldog who is generally amiable and friendly, and a loving father to his son, Tyke.
- Sam Kwasman as Quacker: A little duckling who is very trusting, even trusting Tom in many situations in which Tom wishes to eat him.
- Rachael MacFarlane as Toodles Galore (credited as Toots), Gwennie, Riva McDiva
- Grey Griffin as Female Zoo Patron, Pigeon, Zoo Announcer
- Stephen Stanton as Concierge, Taxi Driver, Chameleon Owner, Shopkeeper, Hot Dog Vendor, Store Announcer
- Diane Michelle as Old Lady, Mrs. Vandarkashian
- Flula Borg as Gunnar
- Leslie David Baker as Mr. Piper
- Brian T. Delaney as Chapman, Zoo Guard
- Kimberly Brooks as Lt. General Mother
- Regi Davis as Sgt. Clayton T. McTabby, Ambassador's Husband
- Kurt Kanazawa as Digital Translator, Announcer
- Daniel Ross as Jimmy
- Laraine Newman as Rosie
- Kari Wahlgren as Mom
- Dee Bradley Baker as Pedestrian
- Chris Edgerly as Rolf, Rudy
- Trevor Devall as Tom's double
- Katie Leigh as Dowager, Young Girl
- Carlos Alazraqui as Robber

== Episodes ==
=== Series overview ===
Season	Segments	Episodes	Originally released
1	28	7	July 1, 2021
2	24	6	November 18, 2021

All episodes were directed by Darrell Van Citters.

=== Season 1 (2021) ===
No. overall	No. in season	Title	Story by	Storyboard by	Original release date
1	1	"Put a Ring on It"	Will Finn	Kevin Harkey	July 1, 2021
1	1	"Come Fly with Me"	Will Finn	Sean Bishop	July 1, 2021
1	1	"Bubble Gum Crisis"	Will Finn	Tod Carter	July 1, 2021
1	1	"Mousequerade"	Michael Dan Berman	Jenny Kang	July 1, 2021
After the events of The Tom and Jerry Show and the 2021 live-action film, In New York City, Jerry receives a ring, prompting Tom to accidentally lead them both to a department store after it closes for the night. Jerry helps a female pigeon while Tom tries to eat them. Tom and Jerry want bubble gum, but accidentally get into sticky situations. Tom tries to get a baby panda back to the zoo.
2	2	"Museum Peace"	Will Finn	Kevin Harkey	July 1, 2021
2	2	"Here Kite-y Kite-y"	Michael Dan Berman	Kevin Harkey	July 1, 2021
2	2	"Street Wise Guys"	Will Finn	Tod Carter	July 1, 2021
2	2	"Chameleon Story"	Kevin Fleming and Rob Janas	Jordan Koch	July 1, 2021
Jerry helps a sleepwalking elephant escape from a museum. Jerry and Tuffy get their revenge on Tom when he destroyed their sand castle while flying a kite. Tom and Jerry disrupt street performers throughout the city. Jerry meets a friendly chameleon named Leon who has broken out of the hotel.
3	3	"Telepathic Tabby"	Kevin Fleming and Rob Janas	Kevin Harkey	July 1, 2021
3	3	"Shoe-In"	Will Finn	Kevin Harkey	July 1, 2021
3	3	"It's a Gift"	Will Finn	Slaven Reese	July 1, 2021
3	3	"Stormin' the Doorman"	Will Finn	TJ House	July 1, 2021
In an attempt to trick Tom out of food, Butch predicts the future. Jerry helps save a shoe repair shop. Tom is on a mission to keep Jerry away from the gift shop snack aisle. The hotel's energetic new doorman mistakes Tom for a stray cat.
4	4	"The Great Doughnut Robbery"	Will Finn	Jordan Koch	July 1, 2021
4	4	"Torpedon't"	Michael Dan Berman	Sean Bishop	July 1, 2021
4	4	"Billboard Jumble"	Amanda Jaros	Tod Carter	July 1, 2021
4	4	"Horticulture Clash"	Kevin Fleming and Rob Janas	Kevin Harkey	July 1, 2021
Tom and Jerry mistake a burglar's loot for doughnuts. Aquatic mayhem ensues at the park. Tom and Jerry chase through a series of surreal billboards. Spike goes overboard trying to make up for manhandling Tom.
5	5	"Room Service Robots"	Kevin Fleming and Rob Janas	Mark Sonntag	July 1, 2021
5	5	"Coney Island Adventure"	Will Finn	Dirk Erik Schulz	July 1, 2021
5	5	"Scents and Sensibility"	Kevin Fleming and Rob Janas	Jared Beckstrand	July 1, 2021
5	5	"Wrecking Ball"	Will Finn	TJ House	July 1, 2021
A troop of robot bellhops cause trouble. Nightmares come true at a seaside amusement park after dark. After Jerry spritzes him with fetching perfume, Tom becomes canine catnip. Tom and Jerry chase into a building marked for demolition.
6	6	"Cat Hair"	Will Finn	Tod Carter	July 1, 2021
6	6	"Shhh!"	Steven Darancette	Jordan Koch	July 1, 2021
6	6	"Torched Song"	Keith Baxter	Keith Baxter	July 1, 2021
6	6	"Quacker's Lucky Penny"	Sam Kwasman	Mark Sonntag	July 1, 2021
A hotel VIP wants Tom groomed before babysitting her prized pet. Tom chases after Jerry into a library after he hides in a little girl's backpack. Jerry helps Tom rival Butch in a snazzy musical fantasy. Tom tries to steal Quacker's penny for himself, but ends up finding himself with bad luck for taking it.
7	7	"Ready Teddy"	Kevin Fleming and Rob Janas	Kevin Harkey	July 1, 2021
7	7	"Swiss Cuckoo"	Will Finn	Dirk Erik Schulz	July 1, 2021
7	7	"Dream Team"	Mimi Hess	Richard Gaines and Mark Pudleiner	July 1, 2021
7	7	"Private Tom"	Kevin Fleming and Rob Janas	Patrick Reyntens	July 1, 2021
Spike's teddy is accidentally ruined while Tom and Jerry are fighting and try to fix him. While the hotel manager is on vacation to relieve himself of stress, Tom and Jerry stowaway in his luggage. Tom dreams of a basketball championship assisted by Jerry. Tom's military uncle is determined to help him permanently defeat Jerry.

=== Season 2 (2021) ===
No. overall	No. in season	Title	Story by	Storyboard by	Original release date
8	1	"Top of the Heap"	Analisa Labianco and Jeff Spencer	Alfredo Cassano	November 18, 2021
8	1	"Stunt Double Trouble"	Kevin Fleming and Rob Janas	Jose Pepe Mansuy	November 18, 2021
8	1	"Surfer Supreme"	Keith Baxter	Keith Baxter	November 18, 2021
8	1	"Kabuki Cat"	Will Finn	Kevin Harkey	November 18, 2021
Tom and Jerry compete against tricky rats on a trash barge. A "stage cat" stunt double replaces Tom. Tom and Jerry have a musical surf-off at the Jersey Shore. Upon his return to Japan, a Kabuki actor finds Tom and Jerry in his luggage.
9	2	"Too Much Monkey Business"	Kevin Fleming and Rob Janas	Jordan Koch	November 18, 2021
9	2	"Doggie Championship"	Kevin Fleming and Rob Janas	Marc Camelbeke	November 18, 2021
9	2	"Snow Day"	Robert F. Hughes	Robert F. Hughes	November 18, 2021
9	2	"Toots the Terrible"	Kevin Fleming and Rob Janas	Kevin Harkey	November 18, 2021
Tom keeps a VIP chimp from the hotel's bananas. Jerry is the secret weapon in a dog contest, while Tom takes Spike's place. A musical snow frolic on a city winter's day. Toots wants to catch Jerry to spend more time with Tom.
10	3	"The Spa's the Limit"	Kevin Fleming and Rob Janas	TJ House	November 18, 2021
10	3	"The Hair Dignitary"	Kevin Fleming and Rob Janas	Alec Megibben	November 18, 2021
10	3	"Year of the Mouse"	Robert F. Hughes	Robert F. Hughes	November 18, 2021
10	3	"Relativity"	Kevin Fleming and Rob Janas	Alfredo Cassano	November 18, 2021
Jerry and Tuffy ruin Tom and Spike's spa day. Tom trades places with a diplomat's cat. A musical visit to Chinatown spells romance for Jerry – and fireworks for Tom. Tom stalks Jerry's jolly Bavarian cousins during their stay at the hotel.
11	4	"Cat and Mouse Burglars"	Jonathan Rosenthal	Dave Alvarez	November 18, 2021
11	4	"Caterpillar and Mouse"	Michael Dan Berman	Richard Gaines	November 18, 2021
11	4	"Pied Piper of Harlem"	Keith Baxter	Keith Baxter	November 18, 2021
11	4	"Lazy Jerry"	Kevin Fleming and Rob Janas	Kevin Harkey	November 18, 2021
A perky – and thieving – pop star checks into the hotel. Tom's coveted flower has a secret stowaway. A jazzy song punctuates Tom and Jerry's waiter rivalry. An R.C. toy mouse distracts Tom – but makes for a dangerously lazy Jerry, grubbing on all the food he can eat.
12	5	"To Your Health"	Kevin Fleming and Rob Janas	Dirk Erik Schulz	November 18, 2021
12	5	"Golf Brawl"	Will Finn	Dave Alvarez	November 18, 2021
12	5	"Tom's Swan Song"	Robert F. Hughes	Robert F. Hughes	November 18, 2021
12	5	"King Spike the First and Last"	Kevin Fleming and Rob Janas	Patrick Reyntens and Hank Tucker	November 18, 2021
Tom and Jerry keep the hotel clean for the health inspector. Tom and Jerry go wild in an indoor mini-golf park. A protective swan befriends Jerry. Spike fancies himself a canine king, holding court until Tom and Jerry revolt.
13	6	"Planet of the Mice"	Kevin Fleming and Rob Janas	Kevin Harkey	November 18, 2021
13	6	"Ball of Fun"	Will Finn	Jordan Koch	November 18, 2021
13	6	"Big Apple"	Will Finn	Kevin Harkey	November 18, 2021
13	6	"Flamingo A-Go-Go"	Sam Kwasman	Richard Gaines	November 18, 2021
Tom has a nightmare about a human-sized mouse takeover. Jerry inherits a hamster ball. An epic chase through NYC turns into a musical tribute to the city. At the zoo, a flock of flamingoes protects Jerry and Tuffy from Tom.

== Production and development ==
On October 29, 2019, Tom and Jerry in New York was first shown during WarnerMedia's HBO Max conference demo live-stream event, where it was originally known as Tom and Jerry in the Big City and hidden away under Max Originals, fourth in a row alongside Craftopia, The Not-Too-Late Show with Elmo, and The Fungies!.

On May 28, 2020, on the official WarnerMedia Twitter, the day after the streaming service's launch date, posted a video of current and upcoming content heading to and/or on the site, among the end portion of the video listing next-year Max Originals and squeezed in-between Tig n' Seek and Circe, was Tom and Jerry under a new title of in the Big City.

On June 10, 2021, WarnerMedia officially announced the series with its original title of Tom and Jerry in New York, which premiered on HBO Max starting July 1, 2021.

Renegade Animation's Darrell Van Citters and Ashley Postlewaite, who produced The Tom and Jerry Show during the last decade, have returned in the same roles, with Van Citters also directing again.

== Release ==
The series premiered in the United States on July 1, 2021, on HBO Max. In Canada, the series premiered on September 18, 2021, on Teletoon. The second season premiered on November 18. Internationally, the show is broadcast on Boomerang channels.

The series premiered on December 17, 2021, on HBO Max in Brazil and Latin America and later premiered on January 6, 2022, on Cartoon Network. It started airing in India also on March 19, 2022, on Cartoon Network.

== Follow-up film ==
An animated Western film called Tom and Jerry: Cowboy Up! was released later that year in January 2022.

== See also ==
- The Tom and Jerry Show (2014–2021) – reboot series by Renegade Animation
- Tom and Jerry: Cowboy Up! (2022) – reboot movie by Renegade Animation
- Tom and Jerry: Snowman's Land (2022) – reboot movie by Renegade Animation
