= Slap Happy Cartoons =

Canadian animation studio

Slap Happy Cartoons Inc. is a Canadian animation studio founded by Kathy Antonsen, Vito Viscomi, Greg Sullivan, and Josh Meopham in 2004.

== Productions ==
=== Television ===
- The Tom and Jerry Show (2014–2021)
- Nerds and Monsters (2014–2016)
- Wishfart (2017–2018)
- The Hollow (2018–2020)
- Apple & Onion (2019–2021)
- Tom and Jerry in New York (2021)
- Bossy Bear (2023–2024)
- Let's Go, Bananas! (2024–present)

=== Feature films ===
- Teen Titans Go! To the Movies (2018)
- Tom and Jerry: Cowboy Up! (2022)
- Tom and Jerry: Snowman's Land (2022)

=== Promos ===
- Knowledge Kids (animated promos)
