= Francoise Brun-Cottan =

American retired actress (born 1944)

- Born: June 25, 1944 (age 82); Paris, France
- Occupation: Actress
- Years active: 1949–1958

Francoise Brun-Cottan (born June 25, 1944) is a retired French-American actress.

Brun-Cottan provided the voice of Nibbles in the Tom and Jerry shorts in the 1950s era. She voices Nibbles in shorts like The Two Mouseketeers, and Tuffy in Tom and Jerry. She was eight years old when she voiced Nibbles in The Two Mouseketeers.

She was one of the street kids in An American in Paris in 1951 and had bit parts in other movies. Brun-Cottan also voiced Fifi in Tex Avery's animated short The Flea Circus (1954). Her last voice acting role was reprising Tuffy for Royal Cat Nap, which was released in 1957.

In the 1970s and 1980s, Brun-Cottan was one of the executives of Michael Douglas' film production company, Bigstick Productions.

She went on to have an academic and research career. Dr. Brun-Cottan became a senior research scientist who spent over a decade as a Work Place Ethnographer and Interaction Analyst with Xerox PARC and at the Palo Alto Research Center & Webster Research center. She now consults for libraries and government agencies as well as large corporations and research agencies, and also produces personal oral histories and memoirs for/with individuals.
