= Tom and Jerry Special Shorts =

2021 American animated television series

- Genre: Comedy; Slapstick
- Based on: Tom and Jerry by: William Hanna; Joseph Barbera
- Developed by: Peter Browngardt
- Written by: Andrew Dickman; David Gemmill; Mike Ruocco; Kenny Pittenger; Johnny Ryan; Jacob Fleisher; Ryan Khatam
- Directed by: Kenny Pittenger; David Gemmill
- Voices of: William Hanna; Andrew Dickman; Keone Young
- Music by: Carl Johnson; Joshua Moshier
- Country of origin: United States
- Original language: English
- No. of episodes: 2

Production
- Executive producers: Peter Browngardt; Sam Register
- Producers: Rebecca Palatnik; Alex Kirwan
- Editor: Nick Simotas
- Running time: 4–5 minutes
- Production companies: Turner Entertainment Co. Warner Bros. Animation

Original release
- Network: HBO Max
- Release: February 20, 2021

Related
- The Tom and Jerry Show (2014–21); Tom and Jerry in New York (2021)

Tom and Jerry Special Shorts is an American animated television series of shorts based on Tom and Jerry that premiered and ended on HBO Max on February 20, 2021, making it the shortest-lived of any Tom and Jerry-related shows. The series is developed by Peter Browngardt and produced by Warner Bros. Animation. The shorts featured the archived uncredited voices of William Hanna alongside Andrew Dickman.

The shorts are featured in the style of Looney Tunes Cartoons, another short series developed by Browngardt.

== Cast and characters ==
=== Main ===
- William Hanna (voice recordings) and Andrew Dickman as:
  - Tom Cat: Tom is variously depicted as a house cat doing his job, and a victim of Jerry's tricks, sometimes within the same short. (Note: As with The Tom and Jerry Show (2014) and other Tom and Jerry television series, Hanna and Barbara's voices are archived following their death. They also aren't credited for their performances.)
  - Jerry Mouse: Jerry lives in the same house as Tom's owners, allowing chaos and destruction to ensue while he and Tom fight.

=== Notable guest stars ===
- Keone Young as Sushi Chef: Appearing in "On a Roll", the character is a simple chef that was cooking food and notices Jerry stealing some of his sushi, leading to Tom being ordered to get that mouse.

== Episodes ==
No.	Title	Directed by	Written by	Storyboard by	Music by	Original release date	Prod. code
1	"On a Roll"	Kenny Pittenger	Andrew Dickman, Kenny Pittenger, Johnny Ryan and Jacob Fleisher	Andrew Dickman	Joshua Moshier	February 20, 2021	121
In Japan, the local sushi chef notices Jerry scurrying around the Chef's restaurant. In order to earn Chef's keep, Tom determines to catch the sushi-stealing mouse.
2	"The House That Cat Built"	David Gemmill	Ryan Khatam, Mike Ruocco, David Gemmill, Johnny Ryan and Jacob Fleisher	Ryan Khatam and Mike Ruocco	Carl Johnson	February 20, 2021	123
Following Tom's extra-deluxe, extra-large cat castle destroying a "Hole Sweet Hole" portrait in Jerry's house, Jerry invades the castle. Tom becomes determined to get Jerry out of his own luxury.

== Production and reception ==
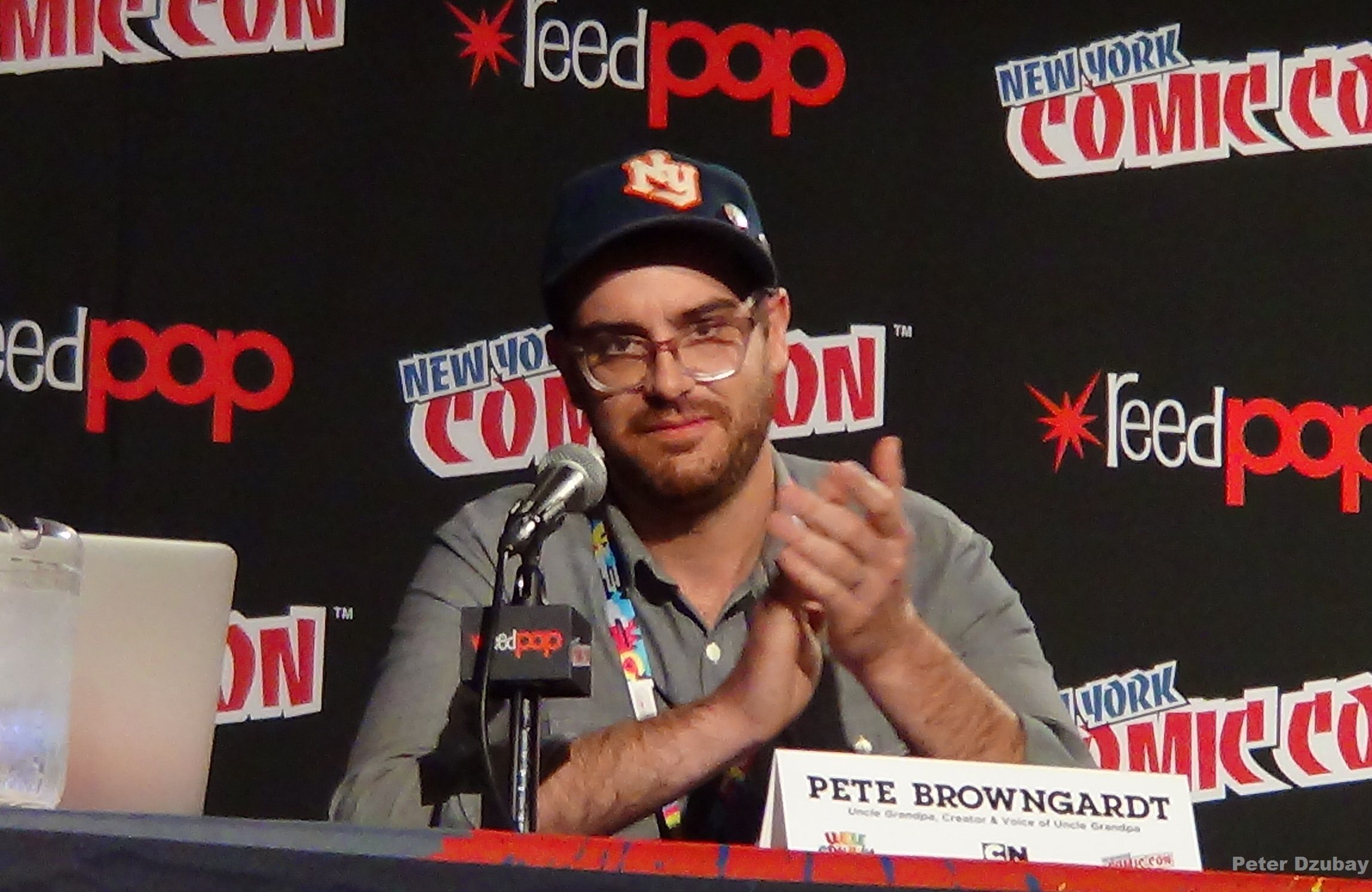
Peter Browngardt developed the shorts after doing so for Looney Tunes Cartoons.

In February 2021, the shorts debuted on HBO Max with no prior announcement. According to Andrew Dickman, the series was worked on the crews spare time while on the production of Looney Tunes Cartoons. Thought to be promotional marketing for the Tom & Jerry film, the shorts received positive reception from fans and critics.

FR Dougal of CartoonMilk, an animation critic and a self-described lifelong Tom and Jerry fan, gave the shorts a negative review. Despite praising their art style's reminiscence of the mid-1940s character designs and numerous gags, he criticized the shorts' character animation, music, and inconsistent sound design, including the overuse of the William Hanna Tom scream.

== See also ==
- Tom and Jerry Television
