= Renegade Animation =

American animation studio

- Type: Private
- Industry: Flash animation Computer animation
- Genre: Animation; Entertainment
- Founded: July 1992; 34 years ago
- Founders: Darrell Van Citters; Ashley Postlewaite
- Headquarters: Glendale, California, U.S.
- Products: Animation; Television programs Commercials
- Website: www.renegadeanimation.com

Renegade Animation is an American animation studio located in Glendale, California, which currently specializes in Adobe Animate and Toon Boom animation. It was founded by Disney and Warner Bros. animator and director Darrell Van Citters and his business partner Ashley Postlewaite in July 1992 in Burbank, California. The studio previously produced Hi Hi Puffy AmiYumi and The Mr. Men Show for Cartoon Network, and The Tom and Jerry Show, Unikitty!, and Tom and Jerry in New York for Warner Bros. Animation.

== History ==
Renegade Animation initially produced several commercials and animated short films, beginning with the second "Hare Jordan" spot for Nike, which featured Bugs Bunny as his own alter-ego and Michael Jordan as Air Jordan, as well as numerous spots for Cheetos and Kellogg's, among others. In the mid-1990s, they moved into internet cartoons, and produced Will Ryan's Elmo Aardvark: Outer Space Detective.

They have since branched out into television, and are perhaps most well known as the producers of cartoon series Hi Hi Puffy AmiYumi, The Mr. Men Show and The Tom and Jerry Show, a series featuring Tom and Jerry. They also co-produced the live-action/traditionally-animated telefilm Re-Animated with Appleday Pictures. Renegade also produced the 2007 direct-to-video Christmas film Christmas Is Here Again based on a story by Robert Zappia, although it since aired in syndication and on Hulu.

== Filmography ==
=== Films ===
Year	Title	Production company(s)	Notes	Refs.
2001	Tomcats	Revolution Studios	Main title sequence	
2006	Re-Animated	Appleday Pictures	TV film	
2007	Christmas Is Here Again	Easy to Dream Productions		
2008	Elefun & Friends: A Tangled Tale	Hasbro Studios		
2009	Cirque du Freak: The Vampire's Assistant	Relativity Media	animation	
2011	Chop Kick Panda	Gaiam		
2011	Puss in Boots: A Furry Tale	Gaiam		
2011	Tappy Toes	Gaiam		
2014	Tom and Jerry: Santa's Little Helpers	Warner Bros. Animation		
2019	Invader Zim: Enter the Florpus	Nickelodeon Animation Studio	retake consulting	
2022	Hotel Transylvania: Transformania	Sony Pictures Animation	End title sequence	
2022	Tom and Jerry: Cowboy Up!	Warner Bros. Animation		
2022	Tom and Jerry: Snowman's Land	Warner Bros. Animation		
2025	Fixed	Sony Pictures Animation		

=== Television ===
Title	Year(s)	Notes	Client
Aliens in the Family	1996	main titles	The Jim Henson Company
Baby Blues	2000	main titles	Warner Bros. Television
Hi Hi Puffy AmiYumi	2004–2006		Cartoon Network
Ben 10	2005–2008	main titles	Cartoon Network
Random! Cartoons	2006–2007	"Mind the Kitty", "The Infinite Goliath", "Bradwurst", "Sugarfoot", "Sparkles and Gloom"	Nickelodeon
Slacker Cats	2007	animation	ABC Family
The Mr. Men Show	2008–2009		Chorion
Little Angels	2010		Hearst Entertainment, Inc.
Mad	2010–2013	various skits	Warner Bros. Animation
The Looney Tunes Show	2011–2013	main titles, bumpers and credits	Warner Bros. Animation
The Tom and Jerry Show	2014–2021		Warner Bros. Animation
Nature Cat	2014	unaired pilot episode	Spiffy Pictures
Tom and Jerry: A Fundraising Adventure	2014	Children in Need short film	Warner Bros. Animation; BBC
Unikitty!	2017–2020		Warner Bros. Animation
Tom and Jerry in New York	2021		Warner Bros. Animation
Sesame Street	2022	"Watch, Play, Learn" shorts (with Lightstar Studios)	Sesame Workshop
Bossy Bear	2023–2024		Imagine Kids+Family; Nickelodeon Animation Studio

=== Interactive projects ===
- Gargoyles (animation; 1995)
- Spider-Man Cartoon Maker (1995)
- X-Men Cartoon Maker (1996)
- Someone's in the Kitchen! (1996)
- 101 Dalmatians: Escape from DeVil Manor (animation; 1997)
- Microsoft Office 2000 (Links assistant; 1999)

=== Short films & Scenes ===
- Captain Sturdy: "Back in Action!" (Cartoon Network pilot; 2001)
- Tom Terrific (cancelled TV reboot pilot) (2002)
- Hi Hi Puffy AmiYumi (unaired pilot) (2003)
- Captain Sturdy: "The Originals" (Adult Swim pilot; 2003)
- A Dairy Tale (animation) (2004)
- Stitch's Great Escape! (animation) (2004)
- Disneyland: The First 50 Magical Years (animation) (2005)
- This Pretty Planet (2005)
- Animate This! (animation for 4 episodes; CBS Innertube series; 2006)
- The Interplanetary Pistons (season 2) (2006)
- Funny Face (short series) (2009)
- Book of Dragons (2D animation) (2011)
- ABCmouse (various digital shorts)
- Hardboiled Eggheads (Amazon pilot; 2014)
- Sausage Party (2016) 'Firewater Story'
- DC Super Hero Girls (webseries; season 5) (2018)
- The JoJo and BowBow Show Show (Nickelodeon webseries; 2018)
- SCADstory (animation; 2019)

=== Commercials ===
- Nike (1993)
- Golden Crisp (1993–1994)
- Trix Cereal (1993)
- Atari Jaguar (1993)
- Campbell's (1993)
- Pebbles (1994–1995)
- Colgate (1994)
- Esso (1995)
- Pepsi (1995)
- Virginia Lottery (1995)
- Apple Macintosh (1995)
- National Highway Traffic Safety Administration (1995)
- Scrubbing Bubbles (1995)
- Carl's Jr. (1996)
- Kraft Foods Inc. (1996)
- Barq's (1996)
- Taco Bell (1996–1997)
- Honey Smacks (1996–1997)
- Cheetos (1997–2000)
- Trix Yogurt (1997–1999)
- California Prune Board (1997)
- Cartoon Network (1997–1998, 2002)
- Midas (1998)
- McDonald's (1998)
- Bull's-Eye Barbecue Sauce (1998)
- SpaghettiOs (1998)
- Vlasic Pickles (1999)
- Village Pantry (1999)
- BulkRegister (2000)
- Cheese Nips (2001)
- Target (2001)
- Rice Krispies (2001)
- Dodge (2002)
- Walt Disney World (2002)
- Cocoa Puffs (2004–2005)
- H-E-B (2006)
- Prego (2007)
- GEICO (2011)
- Wienerschnitzel (2014)
- KITH NYC (2020)
- Etihad Airways (2022)
