= Chariots of Fur =

1994 Warner Bros short film

- Directed by: Chuck Jones
- Written by: Chuck Jones
- Produced by: Chuck Jones; Linda Jones Clough
- Starring: Chuck Jones; Paul Julian
- Music by: George Daugherty; Cameron Patrick
- Color process: Technicolor
- Production companies: Warner Bros. Family Entertainment; Warner Bros. Animation; Chuck Jones Film Productions
- Distributed by: Warner Bros. Pictures
- Release date: December 21, 1994 (USA)
- Running time: 7:14
- Country: United States

Chariots of Fur is a seven-minute Looney Tunes short released in 1994 by Warner Bros. Pictures. It features Wile E. Coyote and the Road Runner and was directed by Chuck Jones.

== Plot ==
In a series of schemes, Wile E. Coyote (Dogius Ignoramii) fails to capture the elusive Road Runner (Boulevardius-Burnupius), facing comedic mishaps at every turn. He tries an ACME Giant Mouse Trap, a spring-loaded rock, and even an ACME Instant Road, all resulting in his own misfortune. When a botched attempt to shoot himself at the Road Runner using a giant bow slings Wile E. into a cactus, it gives him a new idea; he dons an ACME Trick-or-Treat Cactus Costume, which also backfires. Later, Wile E. tries to use a see-saw to reach the Road Runner, but ends up injuring himself instead. The final attempt involves ACME Lightning Bolts, but Wile E. ends up being zapped repeatedly, ultimately fleeing from the relentless bolts into the sunset.

== Production notes ==
The film's soundtrack features music from Bedřich Smetana's opera, The Bartered Bride, and it premiered in North American theaters alongside Richie Rich. This marked the first theatrical release of a new Wile E. Coyote and Road Runner short since 1966. Titled in parody of Chariots of Fire (1981), this was also the last Wile E. Coyote and Road Runner short directed by Chuck Jones, marking their final appearances in three-strip Technicolor.

== Home media ==
The short was released by Warner Home Video on various formats. The first being a VHS entitled Road Runner & Wile E Coyote: Looney Tunes, Chariots of Fur with other various cartoons. Later on, the cartoon was included, in widescreen and full frame versions, in the Road Runner and Wile E. Coyote: Supergenius Hijinks DVD.
