= The Tom and Jerry Show (2014 TV series) =

American animated television series

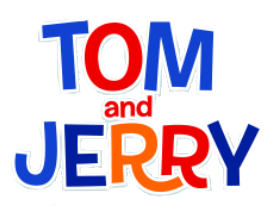
- Genre: Adventure; Comedy; Slapstick
- Based on: Tom and Jerry by: William Hanna; Joseph Barbera
- Developed by: Darrell Van Citters
- Directed by: Darrell Van Citters
- Voices of: William Hanna; Richard Danhakl; Jason Alexander; Stephen Stanton; Grey DeLisle; Rick Zieff; Rene Mujica; Cree Summer; Rachael MacFarlane; Joey D'Auria; Gary Cole; Chris Parnell; Tom Kenny; Robbie Daymond
- Narrated by: Gary Cole ("The Cat & Mouse Detectives"); Chris Parnell ("The Great Outdoors")
- Theme music composer: Scott Bradley
- Opening theme: "Tom and Jerry Theme" (written by Scott Bradley; performed by Andy Sturmer)
- Composers: David Ricard; John Van Tongeren; Steve Morrell; Vivek Maddala; Dan Blessinger
- Country of origin: United States
- Original language: English
- No. of seasons: 5
- No. of episodes: 117 (list of episodes)

Production
- Executive producer: Sam Register
- Producers: Ashley Postlewaite; Darrell Van Citters
- Editor: Michael D'Ambrosio
- Running time: 11 minutes (season 1) or 7 minutes (seasons 2-5), paired into half-hours of 22 minutes
- Production companies: Turner Entertainment Co.; Warner Bros. Animation (Note: Animation services by Renegade Animation)

Original release
- Network: Cartoon Network (US); Teletoon (Canada)
- Release: March 1, 2014 – November 29, 2018
- Network: Boomerang
- Release: February 1, 2019 – February 15, 2021

Related
- Tom and Jerry Tales (2006-08); Tom and Jerry Special Shorts (2021); Tom and Jerry in New York (2021)

The Tom and Jerry Show is an American animated comedy television series produced by Warner Bros. Animation and Turner Entertainment Co., and animated by Renegade Animation. Based on the characters and theatrical cartoons created by William Hanna and Joseph Barbera, the series premiered on Teletoon in Canada on March 1, 2014, and on Cartoon Network in the United States on April 9, 2014. It also aired on Boomerang in the U.S., which became its primary network starting in 2017.

The fourth season premiered on February 1, 2021, on Boomerang SVOD and the Cartoon Network app, while the fifth season was released on the Cartoon Network app and Boomerang on February 1 and 15, 2021, respectively. The fifth season was later removed from the service.

Following the conclusion of the series, HBO Max launched Tom and Jerry Special Shorts and Tom and Jerry in New York, the latter debuting on July 1, 2021.

== Plot ==
The series follows the comedic rivalry between Tom and Jerry, with various scenarios throughout its run. In a typical modern-day urban setting, Tom's attempts to catch Jerry lead to numerous antics. The show also features Tom and Jerry in different roles, including working as detectives in Tolucaville, Tom as a butler in a Downton Abbey-style estate, and various other settings, such as a farm and a Transylvanian environment.

== Episodes ==
Season	Segments	Episodes	Originally released		
Season	Segments	Episodes	First released	Last released	Network
1	52	26	April 9, 2014	August 4, 2014	Cartoon Network
Special			October 7, 2014		Direct-to-video
2	78	26	February 6, 2016	November 29, 2018	Cartoon Network; Boomerang
3	78	26	February 1, 2019	December 2, 2019	Boomerang
4	78	26	February 1, 2021		Boomerang; Cartoon Network App
5	39	13	February 15, 2021		Boomerang; Cartoon Network App
Films	N/A	2	January 25, 2022	November 15, 2022	Direct-to-video

== Characters ==
=== Main ===
- Tom Cat – A hapless, navy blue tuxedo cat who clashes with Jerry.
- Jerry Mouse – A clever brown mouse who usually clashes with and outsmarts Tom.
- Spike Bulldog – A bad-tempered tan bulldog whom Tom and Jerry are frequently at odds with. However, he and Tom seem to be somewhat more friendly to each other this series onwards, and the former is more aware of Jerry's participation in provoking his anger, despite retaining their friendship. He is also Tyke's father.
- Tyke Bulldog – A tan bulldog puppy who is Spike's son.
- Tuffy Mouse – A young grey mouse who wears a diaper and is Jerry's nephew.
- Butch Cat – A black alley cat who lives on the street and is Tom's friend.
- Little Quacker – A young yellow duck who is a good friend to Jerry.

=== Recurring ===
- Meathead Cat – A brown alley cat who is friends with Butch.
- Toots (credited as "Toodles Galore") – A female yellow cat with a blue bow on her head who is Tom's on-and-off girlfriend. Tom and Butch often compete for her affections.
- Chérie – A female mouse with a blue bow around her neck who is Jerry's girlfriend.
- Muscles - Who is Jerry's cousin and a mouse with incredible strength.
- Uncle Pecos - Who is Jerry's cowboyish uncle.

=== New characters ===
- Rick and Ginger – The owners of Tom and Spike, who are a married couple. Rick favors Spike while Ginger favors Tom, although they each both equally appreciate one pet over the other.
- Hildie and Beatie – Two witches living with Tom and Jerry, in a haunted house.
- Newt – An orange Triton which uses an eyepatch. He also lives in the house of the two witches.
- Napoleon – A grey rat who is a friend of Jerry. He lives in Dr. Bigby's scientific laboratory.
- Hamster – A clever, yet unnamed hamster who also lives in Bigby's laboratory.
- Dr. Bigby – A scientist working in a peculiar laboratory. He is also the owner of Jerry, Napoleon, Hamster, and Bot.
- Uncle Harry - A Hawaiian mouse who is Jerry and Tuffy's uncle in the episode "Say Uncle".
- Doofy - A young light brown mouse and is Tuffy's cousin.
- Rutger, Rolf, and Rudy – A trio of loud German grey mice introduced in season 3, who live in Catsylvania.
- Cates – The top butler and boss of Tom in the Downton Abbey manor.
- Maude – A farmer.

== Voice cast ==
- William Hanna, Richard Danhakl – Tom Cat, Jerry Mouse (archived recordings, uncredited)
  - Mel Blanc, Sara Berner – Tom & Jerry's additional screams and other vocal effects (archival recordings, uncredited)
  - Harry E. Lang - Tom’s laughing (archival recording, uncredited)
- Rick Zieff – Spike, Meathead (season 2 onwards), Barkley the Dog, Skid, Dutch, Santa, Skullie, Trucket Man, Squirrel, Man 3, Hotel Manager
- Grey DeLisle (as Grey Griffin) – Ginger Sullivan, Winston's Owner, Drone
- Stephen Stanton – Rick Sullivan (season 2 onwards), Muscles Mouse, Uncle Pecos, Jack Benny Mouse, Commercial voice, Frankie, Claude, Matthew Peterson's Cat, Country Wolf, City Wolf, Whispering Voice, Delivery Driver, Neighbor, Reporter, Mynah
- Jason Alexander – Rick Sullivan (season 1 only)
- Kath Soucie – Tuffy, Mimi, Aunt Claire, Cozette, Gigi, Baby Mockingbirds, Princess
- Alicyn Packard – Toodles, Madame Beta, Matalyn, Coco
- Rene Mujica – Newt, Bear, Tom's 7th Life
- Cree Summer – Beatie
- Rachael MacFarlane – Hildie, Mummy
- Joey D'Auria – Butch, Jeff Williams, Meathelda, TV Narrator, Dawn O' Day, Droopy Dog
- Sam Kwasman – Quacker
- Gary Cole – "The Cat and Mouse Detectives" Narrator
- Chris Parnell – "The Great Outdoors" Narrator
- Simon Helberg – Napoleon, My Bot-y Guard
- Tom Kenny – Detective, Dr. Bigby, Hamster, Wilfred Collins, Tom's 1st Life, Tom's 4th Life, Tom's 5th Life, Tom's 8th Life, Ronnie the Rabbit, Percy, Guard Dog
- Cristina Pucelli – Mathilda Johnston
- Charlie Adler – Polly's Owner
- Yuri Lowenthal – Waiter #4
- Dave B. Mitchell – Tom's 2nd Life, Tom's 3rd Life, Tom's 6th Life, Petey, Mummy's Spellbook, Rat, Meathead (season 1 only)
- Phil Lollar – Monkey, Frank Anderson, Crooked Eddie, Man 1, Man 2, German Shepherd
- Katie Leigh – Woman 1, Woman 2, Stardust, Gypsy Lady
- Kari Wahlgren – Chérie, Fifi, Sabrina the Poodle, Miss Betty Sue
- Catherine Cavadini – Toodles' Mom
- Trevor Devall – Toodles' Dad, Clerk, Stinker, Shop Owner, Delivery Guy, Donnie ("Fight in the Museum" only)
- Julie Wittner – Bunny, Roxie, Misty
- Rob Paulsen – Scarf
- Robin Atkin Downes – Large Marvin
- Charlie Schlatter – Maurice Grayson
- John Michael Higgins – Uncle Harry
- Robbie Daymond – SiFu, Batboy, Ramone, Dog #3, Announcer ("Cat Dance Fever" only)
- Yvette Nicole Brown – Momma Mockingbird
- Phil LaMarr – Tom's Shadow
- Sean Kenin — Screwy Squirrel
- Bill Farmer — Butch the Dog
- Gilbert Gottfried – Geanie
- Tara Strong – Tooth Fairy
- Maddie Taylor – Winston James
- Patton Oswalt – Carver
- Jason Hightower – Red, Honi Honi
- Sean Donnellan – Lawyer
- Kurtwood Smith – Scott Richardson (Human)
- Marieve Herington – Ellen Caulfield
- Robert Cait – Carlton Jones
- Lesley Nicol – Maid
- Ian James Corlett - Giants
- Erick Bolivar - Tom (singing voice; season 5)
- Corey Burton – Mad Dog
- Diane Michelle – Nanny
- Donovan Patton – Hector Hare
- Jake Green – Jake the Tortoise
- Jeremy Crutchley – Cates
- Daniel Ross – Rutger, Dave Brennan, Fritz, Zombie Cats, Crow, JubJub, Female Bug #1, Scarecrow
- Chris Edgerly – Rudy, Rolph
- Nat Faxon – Mascot Mouse
- Eric Bauza – Skunk
- David Shaughnessy – Cates
- Ben Diskin – George McKay
- Maurice LaMarche – Gruntman
- JP Karliak – Boris Morris
- Keith Ferguson – Rocco
- Susan Silo – Aunt Luella
- Billy West – Tyro Thompson
- Dave Boat – Ace
- Nickie Bryar – Cindy Wilson
- Kiff Vandenheuvel – Mesmo, Ambrose
- Jenelle Lynn Randall – Myrtle
- Brad Abrell – Plucky, TV Announcer
- D.C. Douglas – Mick the Magnificent
- Lori Alan – Neighbor
- Arnold Livingston Geis – Singing Opera Tenor
- Steve Blum – Dracula
- Neil Ross – Dr. Frankenstein
- Jim Piddock – Alistair Mouse
- Georgie Kidder – Rupert Fernández
- Daniel McKeague – Waffles, Alien
- Tom Bromhead – Dr. Jake L., Hyde
- Stephanie Sheh – Little Girl

== Production ==
The Tom and Jerry Show was initially announced as a series of 26 episodes, each comprising two 11-minute segments, intended to air on Cartoon Network and remain faithful to the original theatrical shorts. The premiere, originally set for 2013, was delayed to April 9, 2014.

From the second season, the show underwent a retooling of its art style and adjusted the segment length to 7 minutes to better align with the original MGM shorts. As a result, episodes feature three segments instead of two.

Produced by Warner Bros. Animation and Renegade Animation. the series is presented in a 16:9 widescreen aspect ratio and animated by Renegade Animation, PiP Animation Services, Slap Happy Cartoons and Top Draw Animation (seasons 2–3 only) using Adobe Flash. The sound design was done by Rich Danhakl at Advantage Audio and composer Dan Blessinger.

The Tom and Jerry Theme Song, written by Scott Bradley, was used as the opening theme of this series, arranged by Andy Sturmer.

== Broadcast ==
The Tom and Jerry Show premiered on March 1, 2014, on Teletoon in Canada, and on April 9, 2014, on Cartoon Network in the United States. It subsequently premiered on Cartoon Network in Australia on May 5, 2014. In the United Kingdom and Ireland, the series began airing on Boomerang on April 12, 2014, and later on CITV starting in 2016. In India, it premiered on Cartoon Network on April 21, 2014, and was later rebroadcast with Hindi dialogue on November 14, 2020. In the United States, Boomerang began airing the series on January 5, 2015. In Indonesia, it was broadcast on GTV beginning February 13, 2017, and on RCTI starting August 13, 2017. In China, it has aired on China Central Television.

== Home media ==
=== Region 1 DVDs ===
==== Main series ====
Region 1
Season	DVD title	Episode count	Total running time	Release date
1	The Tom and Jerry Show (Season One, Part One – Frisky Business)	13	286 minutes	September 23, 2014
2	The Tom and Jerry Show (Season One, Part Two – Funny Side-Up)	13	286 minutes	January 13, 2015

=== Region 2 DVDs ===
==== Main series ====
Region 2
Season	DVD title	Episode count	Total running time	Release date
1	The Tom and Jerry Show (Season One, Part One – Frisky Business)	13	272 minutes	October 13, 2014

== Reception ==
The series has received generally mixed reviews, with criticism directed at a lack of innovation compared to previous iterations of the franchise.

== See also ==
- Tom and Jerry in New York (2021) – reboot series by Renegade Animation
- Tom and Jerry: Cowboy Up! (2022) – reboot movie by Renegade Animation
- Tom and Jerry: Snowman's Land (2022) – reboot movie by Renegade Animation
