= Nibbles (Tom and Jerry) =

Character from Tom and Jerry cartoons

Nibbles/Tuffy
- Tom and Jerry character
- Nibbles patting his stomach in delight after eating a whole turkey in The Little Orphan (1949).
- First appearance: The Milky Waif (1946)
- Created by: Initial Creation: Gaylord Du Bois; Finalization: William Hanna; Joseph Barbera
- Voiced by: Francoise Brun-Cottan (1952–1958); Lucille Bliss (1958); Lou Scheimer (1980); Frank Welker (1980); Nancy Cartwright (1993); Alan Marriott (2000–2002); Tara Strong (2002); Reece Thompson (2006); Chantal Strand (2007–2008); Kath Soucie (2010–present); Eri Tanaka (2022); Nana Kumagai (2024–present)

In-universe information
- Species: House mouse (Mus musculus)
- Gender: Male
- Relatives: Jerry (uncle); Muscles Mouse (cousin); Merlin Mouse (cousin); Uncle Pecos (great uncle)
- Nationality: American; French (Mouseketeers trilogy)

Nibbles (also known as Tuffy) is a fictional character from the Tom and Jerry cartoon series. He is a small, blue/gray, diaper-wearing orphan mouse whose cartoon debut came in the 1946 short The Milky Waif. He looks alike Jerry and smaller than him, presenting him to guess him as Jerry's younger brother.

Nibbles was later featured in the 1949 Academy Award-winning short The Little Orphan, as well as Two Little Indians and The Two Mouseketeers (both 1952).

== Origin and development ==
Nibbles was originally created by cartoonist Gaylord Du Bois, and made his debut appearance in the first issue of Our Gang Comics in 1942. Despite his diaper, he was presented as a peer of Jerry rather than a younger individual. The gray mouse's name was also given as "Tuffy" from the start, a name later used in subsequent media appearances. William Hanna and Joseph Barbera would later adapt the character in the 1946 cartoon The Milky Waif through the form of "Nibbles". In the animated shorts, Nibbles is depicted as a hungry and curious orphaned mouse where he is mentioned to live at the fictional Bide-a-Wee Mouse Home.

After his first three appearances in Tom and Jerry theatrical shorts, Nibbles starred in The Two Mouseketeers and was voiced by Francoise Brun-Cottan where the character mostly speaking in French. She would later voice the character again with three sequels of the trilogy and the last was Royal Cat Nap in 1958 and that year, Lucille Bliss voiced Nibbles in Robin Hoodwinked, where the character made his final theatrical appearance at the time of the Golden Age of Animation. Nibbles would continue to appear in subsequent Tom and Jerry media, most recently appearing in Tom and Jerry: Snowman's Land from 2022.

== Featured cartoons ==
=== Tom and Jerry ===
- The Milky Waif (1946)
- The Little Orphan (1949)
- Safety Second (1950)
- The Two Mouseketeers (1952)
- Two Little Indians (appears with an identical twin) (1953)
- Life with Tom (1953)
- Little School Mouse (1954)
- Mice Follies (1954)
- Touché, Pussy Cat! (1954)
- Tom and Chérie (1955)
- Feedin' the Kiddie (1957)
- Royal Cat Nap (1958)
- Robin Hoodwinked (1958)

=== The Tom and Jerry Comedy Show ===
- Pied Piper Puss
- No Museum Peace

=== Tom & Jerry Kids ===
- Musketeer Jr.

=== Tom and Jerry Tales ===
- Cat Nebula
- Cat Show Catastrophe
- Cat of Prey (cameo appearance)
- Sasquashed
- DJ Jerry (cameo appearance)

=== The Tom and Jerry Show (2014) ===
- Haunted Mouse
- What a Pain
- Turn About
- Tuffy Love
- Just Plane Nuts
- Pets Not Welcome
- Cruisin' for a Bruisin'
- Hunger Strikes
- Say Cheese
- Picture Imperfect
- Slinging in the Rain
- The Paper Airplane Chase
- Say Uncle
- Here Comes the Bride
- Tuffy's Big Adventure
- Dandy Do-Gooders
- Tom-Fu
- Toodle Boom
- Splinter of Discontent
- Pinch Hitter
- Cat Match Fever
- When You Leash Expect It
- Home Away from Home
- Costume Party Smarty
- Hockey Jockey
- Hyde and Shriek
- Kiss and Makeup
- Knighty Knight Knight
- Mirror Image
- Gym Rat

== Voice actors ==
English

- Francoise Brun-Cottan (1952–1958)
- Sara Berner: laughing in Little School Mouse (1954)
- Lucille Bliss: Robin Hoodwinked (1958)
- Lou Scheimer: The Tom and Jerry Comedy Show
- Frank Welker: The Tom and Jerry Comedy Show (wraparound segments in episodes 1-2, 8)
- Nancy Cartwright: Tom & Jerry Kids
- Alan Marriott: Tom and Jerry in Fists of Furry, Tom and Jerry in War of the Whiskers
- Tara Strong: Tom and Jerry: The Magic Ring
- Reece Thompson: Tom and Jerry Tales (season 1)
- Chantal Strand: Tom and Jerry: A Nutcracker Tale, Tom and Jerry Tales (season 2)
- Kath Soucie: (2010–present), Tom and Jerry Meet Sherlock Holmes, Tom and Jerry and the Wizard of Oz, The Tom and Jerry Show, Tom and Jerry: Willy Wonka and the Chocolate Factory, Tom and Jerry: Snowman's Land
- Grey DeLisle: Mad
- Lyric Shute: Tom and Jerry Time

Japanese

- Eri Tanaka: Tom and Jerry Gokko (episodes 2–9)
- Nana Kumagai: Tom and Jerry Gokko (episodes 10–present)
