= Darrell Van Citters =

American director, animator, and author

- Born: Ann Arbor, Michigan, US
- Education: CalArts
- Years active: 1974–present
- Known for: Directing Hi Hi Puffy AmiYumi & Looney Tunes

Darrell Van Citters is an American director, animator, and author, whose credits include directing the animated television series Hi Hi Puffy AmiYumi and directing popular Looney Tunes cartoons featuring Bugs Bunny, Daffy Duck, Porky Pig, Sylvester the Cat, Tweety, and Foghorn Leghorn. He partnered with Ashley Postlewaite in 1992 to form Renegade Animation. He studied animation at the California Institute of the Arts.

== Early career ==
Van Citters began his career in animation training at the prestigious California Institute of the Arts in the Disney-sponsored Character Animation program. While still at Cal Arts, he spent one summer working at Chuck Jones' studio as in-betweener/gofer. The next summer he spent as an assistant at Filmation Studios.

== Walt Disney Animation Studios years ==
After graduating, he went straight into the animation business and started at the Walt Disney Studio as a trainee in animation. He worked his way up to animator on The Fox and the Hound and, after working on story for a few TV specials, he was placed as director on Fun with Mr. Future. Van Citters continued as director and did much of the original development work on Who Framed Roger Rabbit, including his personal choice for the voice of Roger (a then-unknown member of the Los Angeles improv comedy group The Groundlings, Paul Reubens). His final Disney project was directing the "Sport Goofy" film Soccermania in 1987.

== Warner Bros. Animation years ==
Van Citters moved to Warner Bros. Animation in 1987 as an animator (his first work with Warner Bros. was 1988's Daffy Duck's Quackbusters), before being promoted as Creative Director a couple years later. His duties included overseeing almost every aspect of the classic Warners characters from the new shorts, to commercials to the comic strip and print work. He was asked to direct the first new Bugs Bunny short in over 26 years and, after bringing in a full animation staff, Box Office Bunny was produced and released with the Warner Bros. feature film, The NeverEnding Story II: The Next Chapter.

While with Warner Bros., when Mel Blanc died in July 1989, Van Citters drew the famous "Speechless" drawing, which showed a spotlight on a microphone, as Bugs Bunny, Daffy Duck, Porky Pig, Tweety, Sylvester, Yosemite Sam, Pepé Le Pew, Speedy Gonzales, and Foghorn Leghorn somberly bowed their heads in a moment of silence.

== Renegade Animation years ==
In July 1992, Van Citters left Warner Bros. to strike out on his own, forming Renegade Animation along with ex-Warners' alumna Ashley Postlewaite. Since incorporation the company has produced a multitude of commercials, with highlights including: the "It ain't easy bein' cheesy" and “Dangerously cheesy!” campaigns featuring Chester Cheetah, NBA great Dennis Rodman's famous ad in which one of his tattoos is seen eating a burger for Carl's Jr., and the Bugs Bunny/Michael Jordan "Hare Jordan/Aerospace Jordan" commercials (although, technically, the first Hare Jordan spot was produced while he was still with Warner Bros.).

Craving creative freedom and control, Darrell steered Renegade to be one of the pioneers in internet animation and won an Annie Award in 2001 for the web series Elmo Aardvark: Outer Space Detective. The following year, Renegade made its first foray into television series production with the "Captain Sturdy" shorts for Cartoon Network. Other series followed, including Hi Hi Puffy AmiYumi and The Mr. Men Show, as well as the direct-to-DVD full-length animated film Christmas Is Here Again. From 2014 to 2021, he directed every episode of The Tom and Jerry Show. In 2021, he directed every episode of Tom and Jerry in New York for HBO Max.

== Author ==
Van Citters wrote his first book about the first prime time animated television Christmas special, Mister Magoo's Christmas Carol. The publication is a behind-the-scenes look of how United Productions of America made the special. His second book was on the art of the Jay Ward Studio, the producers of Rocky and Bullwinkle, Peabody's Improbable History, Aesop & Son, Fractured Fairy Tales, George of the Jungle and Super Chicken among many others.
