= Ashley Postlewaite =

American theatre manager and producer

Ashley Postlewaite is an American producer who worked in live theatre. She produced Bugs Bunny on Broadway for Warner Bros., where she met Darrell Van Citters. After working with Warner Bros. for another year and a half, Postlewaite and Van Citters formed Renegade Animation in July 1992.
