= Scooby's All-Star Laff-A-Lympics =

- Also known as: Scooby's All-Stars
- Genre: Comedy
- Created by: Joe Ruby; Ken Spears
- Directed by: Charles August Nichols; Ray Patterson (1978); Carl Urbano (1978)
- Presented by: Snagglepuss; Mildew Wolf
- Voices of: Don Messick; Daws Butler; Mel Blanc; Casey Kasem; Frank Welker; Julie McWhirter; Julie Bennett; Joe Besser; Alan Oppenheimer; John Stephenson; Heather North; Pat Stevens; Gary Owens; Laurel Page; Marilyn Schreffler; Vernee Watson
- Theme music composer: Hoyt Curtin
- Country of origin: United States
- Original language: English
- No. of episodes: 24 (list of episodes)

Production
- Executive producers: William Hanna; Joseph Barbera
- Producers: Don Jurwich (1978); Alex Lovy (1978); Art Scott (1978)
- Editors: Larry C. Cowan; Dick Elliot; Gil Iverson
- Camera setup: George Epperson; Jerry Smith; Reba Bement; Tom Epperson; Chuck Flekal; Curt Hall; Ron Jackson; Larry Smith; Terry Smith; Brandy Whittington; Jerry Whittington
- Running time: 120 minutes (1977–78); 90 minutes (1978–79)
- Production company: Hanna-Barbera Productions

Original release
- Network: ABC
- Release: September 10, 1977 – September 2, 1978

Related
- The Scooby-Doo Show; Laff-A-Lympics; Dynomutt, Dog Wonder; Captain Caveman and the Teen Angels; Scooby-Doo, Where Are You!

Scooby's All-Star Laff-A-Lympics is a two-hour Saturday morning animated program block produced by Hanna-Barbera Productions and broadcast on ABC from September 10, 1977, until September 2, 1978.

The block featured five Hanna-Barbera series among its segments: The Scooby-Doo Show, Laff-A-Lympics, The Blue Falcon & Dynomutt, Captain Caveman and the Teen Angels, and reruns of Scooby-Doo, Where Are You!. During the second season in 1978–79, the show was re-titled Scooby's All-Stars and broadcast on ABC from September 9, 1978, to December 23, 1978. The runtime was reduced from 120 minutes to 90 minutes by dropping The Blue Falcon & Dynomutt and Scooby-Doo, Where Are You!.

== Overview ==
Scooby's All-Star Laff-A-Lympics included five cartoon segments:

- Laff-A-Lympics (two segments, 11 minutes each): Based on Battle of the Network Stars, this series featured 45 Hanna-Barbera characters, including Scooby-Doo, Yogi Bear, Mumbly, and others competing in Olympics-styled events. Both segments opened and closed the show. Sixteen episodes (32 segments) were produced for 1977–78.
- The Scooby-Doo Show (one episode, 30 minutes): Comedy/mystery show about four teenage detectives and their talking dog, Scooby-Doo. Eight first-run episodes were produced for 1977–78, with 16 made for The Scooby-Doo/Dynomutt Hour from 1976–77 re-run following the final first-run episode. Two of the new episodes, as well as two others from 1976–77, feature Scooby-Doo's cousin Scooby-Dum as a recurring character.
- The Blue Falcon & Dynomutt (one episode, 11 minutes each): New episodes featuring the superhero Blue Falcon and his bumbling cyborg dog sidekick Dynomutt, introduced the previous year in the Dynomutt, Dog Wonder segments of The Scooby-Doo/Dynomutt Hour. The new Dynomutt episodes were two-part cliffhangers, of which eight episodes (four stories total) were produced for 1977–78.
- Captain Caveman and the Teen Angels (one episode, 11 minutes): Comedy/mystery show about three female teenage detectives and their companion, a prehistoric caveman superhero thawed from a block of ice. Sixteen episodes were produced for 1977–78.
- Scooby-Doo, Where Are You! (as Scooby-Doo) (one episode, 30 minutes): reruns of the first Scooby-Doo series, originally run on CBS from 1969–70.

When the show became Scooby's All-Stars during the second season on September 9, 1978, the Blue Falcon & Dynomutt and Scooby-Doo, Where Are You! segments were dropped and two Captain Caveman segments were broadcast instead of just one (eight new + a rerun from the previous season). Eight new Laff-A-Lympics and Captain Caveman segments were produced for the block in 1978–79. For the first eight weeks The Scooby-Doo Show segment began the 1978–79 season in reruns, though starting from November 4, the remaining eight new episodes (produced for an aborted revival of Scooby-Doo, Where Are You! as a separate half-hour) were run as part of Scooby's All-Stars. Laff-A-Lympics and Captain Caveman segments also aired reruns from their previous seasons for the remainder of the series run.

For the 1979–80 season, the block was cancelled and Scooby-Doo became a half-hour show as Scooby-Doo and Scrappy-Doo. Laff-A-Lympics and Captain Caveman would resurface on ABC during the latter part of the season in 1980.

== Cast ==
- Don Messick as Boo-Boo Bear, Pixie, Ranger Smith, Scooby-Doo, Mumbly, Dirty Dalton, Mr. Creepley, Junior Creepley, Announcer
- Daws Butler as Yogi Bear, Augie Doggie, Huckleberry Hound, Quick Draw McGraw, Wally Gator, Snagglepuss, Mr. Jinks, Dixie, Hokey Wolf, Super Snooper, Blabber Mouse, Scooby-Dum, Dastardly Dalton
- Julie Bennett as Cindy Bear
- John Stephenson as Doggie Daddy, Mildew Wolf, Dread Baron, The Great Fondoo
- Frank Welker as Fred, Jabberjaw, Yakky Doodle, Tinker, Dynomutt, Magic Rabbit, Sooey
- Mel Blanc as Captain Caveman, Speed Buggy, Barney Rubble
- Alan Oppenheimer as Additional voices
- Bob Holt as Grape Ape, Dinky Dalton, Orful Octopus
- Vernee Watson-Johnson as Dee Dee Skyes
- Marilyn Schreffler as Brenda Chance, Daisy Mayhem
- Laurel Page as Taffy Dare, Mrs. Creepley
- Scatman Crothers as Hong Kong Phooey
- Gary Owens as Blue Falcon
- Alan Reed as Fred Flintstone (earlier episodes)
- Henry Corden as Fred Flintstone (later episodes)
- Casey Kasem as Shaggy Rogers
- Heather North as Daphne
- Pat Stevens as Velma
- Joe Besser as Babu

== Episodes ==
No.in Series	No.in Season	Segment Title	Episode title	Original release date	Prod. code
1	1	"Scooby-Doo"	The Curse of Viking Lake	September 10, 1977	81–17
1	1	"Laff-A-Lympics"	Swiss Alps and Tokyo	September 10, 1977	104-1
1	1	"The Blue Falcon and Dynomutt"	Beastwoman, Part 1	September 10, 1977	83-21
1	1	"Captain Caveman and the Teen Angels"	The Kooky Case of the Cryptic Keys	September 10, 1977	103-1
1	1	"Scooby-Doo, Where Are You!"	rerun	September 10, 1977	45
2	2	"Scooby-Doo"	Vampire Bats and Scaredy Cats	September 17, 1977	81–18
2	2	"Laff-A-Lympics"	Florida and China	September 17, 1977	104-2
2	2	"The Blue Falcon and Dynomutt"	Beastwoman, Part 2	September 17, 1977	83-22
2	2	"Captain Caveman and the Teen Angels"	The Mixed-Up Mystery of Deadman’s Reef	September 17, 1977	103-2
2	2	"Scooby-Doo, Where Are You!"	rerun	September 17, 1977	45
3	3	"Scooby-Doo"	Hang in There, Scooby-Doo	September 24, 1977	81–19
3	3	"Laff-A-Lympics"	Acapulco and England	September 24, 1977	104-3
3	3	"The Blue Falcon and Dynomutt"	The Glob, Part 1	September 24, 1977	83-17
3	3	"Captain Caveman and the Teen Angels"	What a Flight for a Fright	September 24, 1977	103-3
3	3	"Scooby-Doo, Where Are You!"	rerun	September 24, 1977	45
4	4	"Scooby-Doo"	The Chiller Diller Movie Thriller	October 1, 1977	81–21
4	4	"Laff-A-Lympics"	Sahara and Scotland	October 1, 1977	104-4
4	4	"The Blue Falcon and Dynomutt"	The Glob, Part 2	October 1, 1977	83-18
4	4	"Captain Caveman and the Teen Angels"	The Creepy Case of the Creaky Charter Boat	October 1, 1977	103-4
4	4	"Scooby-Doo, Where Are You!"	rerun	October 1, 1977	‘’45’’
5	5	"Scooby-Doo"	The Spooky Case of the Grand Prix Race	October 8, 1977	81–22
5	5	"Laff-A-Lympics"	France and Australia	October 8, 1977	104-5
5	5	"The Blue Falcon and Dynomutt"	Madame Ape Face, Part 1	October 8, 1977	83-19
5	5	"Captain Caveman and the Teen Angels"	The Big Scare in the Big Top	October 8, 1977	103-5
5	5	"Scooby-Doo, Where Are You!"	rerun	October 8, 1977	‘’45’’
6	6	"Scooby-Doo"	The Ozark Witch Switch	October 15, 1977	81–23
6	6	"Laff-A-Lympics"	Athens and Ozarks	October 15, 1977	104-6
6	6	"The Blue Falcon and Dynomutt"	Madame Ape Face, Part 2	October 15, 1977	83-20
6	6	"Captain Caveman and the Teen Angels"	Double Dribble Riddle	October 15, 1977	103-6
6	6	"Scooby-Doo, Where Are You!"	rerun	October 15, 1977	‘’45’’
7	7	"Scooby-Doo"	Creepy Cruise	October 22, 1977	81–24
7	7	"Laff-A-Lympics"	Italy and Kittyhawk, North Carolina	October 22, 1977	104-7
7	7	"The Blue Falcon and Dynomutt"	Shadowman, Part 1	October 22, 1977	83-23
7	7	"Captain Caveman and the Teen Angels"	The Crazy Case of the Tell-Tale Tape	October 22, 1977	103-7
7	7	"Scooby-Doo, Where Are You!"	rerun	October 22, 1977	‘’45’’
8	8	"Scooby-Doo"	The Creepy Heap from the Deep	October 29, 1977	81–20
8	8	"Laff-A-Lympics"	Egypt and Sherwood Forest	October 29, 1977	104-8
8	8	"The Blue Falcon and Dynomutt"	Shadowman, Part 2	October 29, 1977	83-24
8	8	"Captain Caveman and the Teen Angels"	The Creepy Claw	October 29, 1977	103-8
8	8	"Scooby-Doo, Where Are You!"	rerun	October 29, 1977	‘’45’’
9	9	"Scooby-Doo"	rerun	November 5, 1977	‘’81’’
9	9	"Laff-A-Lympics"	Spain and Himalayas	November 5, 1977	104-9
9	9	"The Blue Falcon and Dynomutt"	rerun	November 5, 1977	‘’83’’
9	9	"Captain Caveman and the Teen Angels"	Cavey and the Kabuta Clue	November 5, 1977	103-9
9	9	"Scooby-Doo, Where Are You!"	rerun	November 5, 1977	‘’45’’
10	10	"Scooby-Doo"	rerun	November 12, 1977	‘’81’’
10	10	"Laff-A-Lympics"	India and Israel	November 12, 1977	104-10
10	10	"The Blue Falcon and Dynomutt"	rerun	November 12, 1977	‘’83’’
10	10	"Captain Caveman and the Teen Angels"	Cavey and the Weirdo Wolfman	November 12, 1977	103-10
10	10	"Scooby-Doo, Where Are You!"	rerun	November 12, 1977	‘’45’’
11	11	"Scooby-Doo"	rerun	November 19, 1977	‘’81’’
11	11	"Laff-A-Lympics"	Africa and San Francisco	November 19, 1977	104-11
11	11	"The Blue Falcon and Dynomutt"	rerun	November 19, 1977	‘’83’’
11	11	"Captain Caveman and the Teen Angels"	The Disappearing Elephant Mystery	November 19, 1977	103-11
11	11	"Scooby-Doo, Where Are You!"	rerun	November 19, 1977	‘’45’’
12	12	"Scooby-Doo"	rerun	November 26, 1977	‘’81’’
12	12	"Laff-A-Lympics"	Grand Canyon and Ireland	November 26, 1977	104-12
12	12	"The Blue Falcon and Dynomutt"	rerun	November 26, 1977	‘’83’’
12	12	"Captain Caveman and the Teen Angels"	The Fur Freight Fright	November 26, 1977	103-12
12	12	"Scooby-Doo, Where Are You!"	rerun	November 26, 1977	‘’45’’
13	13	"Scooby-Doo"	rerun	December 3, 1977	‘’81’’
13	13	"Laff-A-Lympics"	Hawaii and Norway	December 3, 1977	104-13
13	13	"The Blue Falcon and Dynomutt"	rerun	December 3, 1977	‘’83’’
13	13	"Captain Caveman and the Teen Angels"	Ride ‘Em Caveman	December 3, 1977	103-13
13	13	"Scooby-Doo, Where Are You!"	rerun	December 3, 1977	‘’45’’
14	14	"Scooby-Doo"	rerun	December 10, 1977	‘’81’’
14	14	"Laff-A-Lympics"	North Pole and Tahiti	December 10, 1977	104-14
14	14	"The Blue Falcon and Dynomutt"	rerun	December 10, 1977	‘’83’’
14	14	"Captain Caveman and the Teen Angels"	The Strange Case of the Creature from Space	December 10, 1977	103-14
14	14	"Scooby-Doo, Where Are You!"	rerun	December 10, 1977	‘’45’’
15	15	"Scooby-Doo"	rerun	December 17, 1977	‘’81’’
15	15	"Laff-A-Lympics"	Arizona and Holland	December 17, 1977	104-15
15	15	"The Blue Falcon and Dynomutt"	rerun	December 17, 1977	‘’83’’
15	15	"Captain Caveman and the Teen Angels"	The Mystery Mansion Mix-Up	December 17, 1977	103-15
15	15	"Scooby-Doo, Where Are You!"	rerun	December 17, 1977	‘’45’’
16	16	"Scooby-Doo"	rerun	December 24, 1977	‘’81’’
16	16	"Laff-A-Lympics"	Quebec and Baghdad	December 24, 1977	104-16
16	16	"The Blue Falcon and Dynomutt"	rerun	December 24, 1977	‘’83’’
16	16	"Captain Caveman and the Teen Angels"	Playing Footsie With Bigfoot	December 24, 1977	103-16
16	16	"Scooby-Doo, Where Are You!"	rerun	December 24, 1977	‘’45’’

== See also ==
- List of Scooby-Doo media
