= Dynomutt, Dog Wonder =

American animated television series

- Title card
- Also known as: The Blue Falcon & Dynomutt
- Genre: Comedy; Sci-fi; Adventure; Superhero
- Created by: Joe Ruby; Ken Spears
- Directed by: Charles A. Nichols
- Voices of: Frank Welker; Gary Owens; Ron Feinberg; Larry McCormick
- Narrated by: Ron Feinberg
- Composer: Hoyt Curtin
- Country of origin: United States
- No. of seasons: 2
- No. of episodes: 24

Production
- Executive producers: William Hanna; Joseph Barbera
- Running time: 22 minutes
- Production company: Hanna-Barbera Productions

Original release
- Network: ABC
- Release: September 11, 1976 – October 1, 1977

Related
- The Scooby-Doo/Dynomutt Hour; Scooby's All-Star Laff-A-Lympics

Dynomutt, Dog Wonder is an American animated television series created by Joe Ruby and Ken Spears and produced by Hanna-Barbera Productions that aired on ABC from September 11, 1976, to October 1, 1977. The show centers on a Batman-esque superhero, the Blue Falcon, and his assistant, Dynomutt, a bumbling, yet effective robotic dog who can produce a seemingly infinite number of mechanical devices from his body. As with many other animated superheroes of the era, no origins for the characters are ever provided.

Dynomutt was originally broadcast as a half-hour segment of The Scooby-Doo/Dynomutt Hour (1976–77), and a quarter-hour segment of its later expanded form Scooby's All-Star Laff-A-Lympics (1977–78); it would later be rerun and syndicated on its own from 1978 on. The cast of The Scooby-Doo Show appeared as recurring characters on Dynomutt, assisting the Daring Duo in cracking their crimes. Originally distributed by Hanna-Barbera's then-parent company Taft Broadcasting, Warner Bros. Television currently holds the distribution rights to the series.

== Overview ==
Millionaire socialite art dealer Radley Crown (voiced by Gary Owens) and his mechanical pet dog Dynomutt (voiced by Frank Welker, who got the inspiration for the voice from the Gertrude and Heathcliff characters of Red Skelton) enjoy leisure time in their base of operations in Big City until alerted by the Falcon Flash. They then immediately dash to the Falcon's Lair (situated in Crown's penthouse), where they switch to their secret identities, the Blue Falcon and Dynomutt, Dog Wonder, respectively. The Blue Falcon and Dynomutt receive the report via TV screen from the secret GHQ of secret agent F.O.C.U.S. One (voiced by Ron Feinberg), jump into the Falconcar and speed into the fray against assorted evildoers.

In a coup similar to the 1960s Batman TV series, the first 10 minutes of Dynomutt ends with a cliffhanger wherein the Daring Duo, in the clutches of their foes, are subjected to a perilous fate which is resolved immediately after the commercial. Like many animated series created by Hanna-Barbera in the 1970s, the show contains a laugh track created by the studio.

The metallic dog employs a system of miniaturized transistors that allow him to extend his limbs or neck and use them to perform extraordinary feats; however, none of them ever work properly. "B.F." (as Dynomutt lovingly refers to him) is more Dynomutt's victim than his master, forever being hamstrung by the latter's insufferably clumsy mechanized mishaps, which often results in the Blue Falcon calling Dynomutt "Dog Blunder". Nevertheless, Dynomutt and the Blue Falcon, equipped with their arsenal of super gadgetry, manage to get the situation well in hand.

Three episodes had a crossover with Scooby-Doo.

== Episodes ==
=== The Scooby-Doo/Dynomutt Hour (1976) ===
The episode titles given reflect Hanna-Barbera studio records. No on-screen titles were given for this series.

No. overall	No. in season	Title	Original release date	Prod. code
1	1	"Everyone Hyde!"^{1}	September 11, 1976	83-4
Willie the Weasel has created a formula that turns him into Mr. Hyde. While the Blue Falcon and Dynomutt are on the trail of the mysterious Mr. Hyde, they encounter the Mystery, Inc. gang and Scooby-Doo (who are unaware that Mr. Hyde is a supervillain and not one of their typical "spooks"). In The New Scooby-Doo Movies-fashion, they team up with the Blue Falcon and Dynomutt (who happens to be Scooby's hero) to stop Mr. Hyde, who has threatened to turn the population of the entire city into "Mr. Hydes" unless he is proclaimed mayor. Fred and the others find a clue (which turns out to be Willie the Weasel's glove), and the Blue Falcon deduces that Willie is Mr. Hyde. The Blue Falcon and Dynomutt have Mr. Hyde proclaimed mayor and pretend to turn themselves in so that Mr. Hyde will lead them to his secret lair and trick him into showing them the antidote to the Hyde formula. Willie the Weasel and his canine partner-in-crime "Snitch" manage to escape. The Blue Falcon and Dynomutt head to the Mayor's mansion to stop Hyde from retrieving his stolen loot. The Mystery, Inc. gang set up one of their infamous "Scooby traps" while the Blue Falcon and Dynomutt confront Mr. Hyde and Snitch. Dynomutt captures Snitch while the Blue Falcon and the Mystery, Inc. crew capture Willie the Weasel/Mr. Hyde. Note: This episode is a crossover between Dynomutt, Dog Wonder and Scooby-Doo.
2	2	"What Now, Lowbrow?"^{1}	September 18, 1976	83-5
A caveman-like criminal named Lowbrow wants to become the King of Crime and steals some books that will help him in his quest. The Blue Falcon and Dynomutt end up assisted by Mystery, Inc. to stop Lowbrow. Note: This episode is another crossover between Dynomutt, Dog Wonder and Scooby-Doo.
3	3	"The Great Brain... Train Robbery"	September 25, 1976	83-1
The Gimmick is a criminal mastermind who uses his prowess of gadgets to create havoc in the city and dares the police to stop him from stealing a train car with a prince inside. Note: Mumbly makes a cameo at the end of the episode.
4	4	"The Day and Night Crawler"	October 2, 1976	83-2
A talking worm called the Worm and his henchman Grub use a digging machine called the Wormborer to spring Bugsy Busby and Roto Chopper from prison in a plot to steal a super-computer.
5	5	"The Harbor Robber"	October 9, 1976	83-3
A fish-themed villain named Fishface plans to steal Big City's oil and hold it for ransom.
6	6	"Sinister Symphony"	October 16, 1976	83-6
Manyfaces uses his talent for disguises to trick Dynomutt into arresting the Blue Falcon, Mayor Gaunt, and the Chief of Police.
7	7	"Don't Bug Superthug"	October 23, 1976	83-7
Superthug and his henchman Zorkon have created a super-dynamic steel skeleton and plan to use it to steal Big City's steel supply to mass-produce an army of steel skeletons.
8	8	"Factory Recall"	October 30, 1976	83-8
The Blue Falcon loses his Falcon Communicator while he and Dynomutt are fighting Mr. Cool. Mr. Cool then makes the Blue Falcon think that he is F.O.C.U.S. One claiming that Dynomutt needs to be recalled to where he was made. With Dynomutt reprogrammed and now under his control, Mr. Cool has Dynomutt dispose of the Blue Falcon while he initiates a plot to freeze Big City.
9	9	"The Queen Hornet"	November 6, 1976	83-9
The Blue Falcon and Dynomutt attempt to get evidence that will put the Queen Hornet in prison.
10	10	"The Wizard of Ooze"^{1}	November 13, 1976	83-10
The Swamp Rat and his henchman Mudmouth plan to flood Big City by using stolen pumps to send half the water in Bogmeyer Swamp into Big City to start a crime spree. The Blue Falcon and Dynomutt, team-up once again with Scooby-Doo and Mystery, Inc. to stop the villains before Big City becomes Bog City. Note: This episode is the third crossover between Dynomutt, Dog Wonder and Scooby-Doo.
11	11	"Tin Kong"	November 20, 1976	83-11
A hack movie director named Eric von Flick plans to make a movie called The Total Destruction of Big City starring his robotic creation, Tin Kong.
12	12	"The Awful Ordeal with the Head of Steel"^{2}	November 25, 1976	83-12
A mysterious criminal named Ironface seeks revenge on Big City by capturing the District Attorney, the Warden of Rockatraz, Detective Malloy, Mayor Gaunt, Judge Grater, Chief of Police Grisby, and the Chief Prosecutor, as well as the Blue Falcon and Dynomutt who it blames for its incarceration. When the Blue Falcon and Dynomutt get captured, they work to free themselves and the other captives. Then they defeat Ironface and its minions as the Blue Falcon unmasks Ironface to be Serpent Lady.
13	13	"The Blue Falcon vs. the Red Vulture"	November 27, 1976	83-13
The Red Vulture steals two of the world's most powerful super-jet engines, with plans to use them for his Vulturejet and, in turn, dominate the airways.
14	14	"The Injustice League of America"^{3}	December 4, 1976	83-14
Fishface, Gimmick, Lowbrow, Queen Hornet, Superthug, and Worm have escaped from Big City Prison and formed the Injustice League of America. They plan to commit a major crime spree and dispose of the Blue Falcon and Dynomutt. Note: the titular villain group has no connection to the DC Comics villain group of the same name.
15	15	"Lighter Than Air Raid"^{3}	December 11, 1976	83-15
An evil genius of the airways named the Blimp is stealing Big City's supply of helium.
16	16	"The Prophet Profits"^{3}	December 18, 1976	83-16
The Prophet sets up his own disasters, which he can predict for Mayor Gaunt and charge him $500,000 for every prediction he wants to know.

- ^{1} These episodes guest-star Scooby-Doo and the Mystery, Inc. gang.
- ^{2} Episode 1.12, "There's a Demon Shark in the Foggy Dark/The Awful Ordeal with the Head of Steel", was originally broadcast not on a Saturday morning, but on Thanksgiving Day 1976 (November 25), during ABC's Thanksgiving Funshine Festival.
- ^{3} These episodes, and all first-season repeats, were broadcast as part of The Scooby-Doo/Dynomutt Show, which included an additional half-hour featuring a Scooby-Doo, Where Are You! rerun.

=== The Blue Falcon & Dynomutt (1977) ===
No. overall	No. in season	Title	Original release date	Prod. code
17	1	"Beastwoman, Pt. 1"	September 10, 1977	83-21
18	2	"Beastwoman, Pt. 2"	September 17, 1977	83-22
A jungle girl-themed villain named Beastwoman uses her multi-frequency Beast Whistle to have the animals at Big City Zoo break out of their cages and drive the people out of Big City. When Dynomutt falls victim to the Beast Whistle, it is up to his master the Blue Falcon to stop her.
19	3	"The Glob, Pt. 1"	September 24, 1977	83-17
20	4	"The Glob, Pt. 2"	October 1, 1977	83-18
The Glob (a.k.a. Norbert Prindle) and his gang plan to steal the Baltese Falcon.
21	5	"Madame Ape Face, Pt. 1"	October 8, 1977	83-19
22	6	"Madame Ape Face, Pt. 2"	October 15, 1977	83-20
An ape-faced woman named Madame Ape Face is using a device to help her steal the faces of beautiful starlets of Big City.
23	7	"Shadowman, Pt. 1"	October 22, 1977	83-23
24	8	"Shadowman, Pt. 2"	October 29, 1977	83-24
Shadowman mysteriously knows all of the plans of the Crime Commission and plans to commit a crime spree where one of them frames Mayor Gaunt.

These four new episodes were also aired under the new title The Blue Falcon & Dynomutt. All in all, Dynomutt, Dog Wonder lasted 20 episodes in total, four episodes more than Jabberjaw.

== Voice cast ==
- Frank Welker – Dynomutt, Fred Jones (in "Everyone Hyde," "What Now, Lowbrow," "The Wizard of Ooze"), Bugsy Busby (in "The Day and Nightcrawler")
- Gary Owens – the Blue Falcon/Radley Crown
- Ron Feinberg – F.O.C.U.S. One, Narrator, Mudmouth (in "The Wizard of Ooze"), Worm (in "The Day and Night Crawler," "The Injustice League of America")
- Larry McCormick – the Mayor of Big City

=== Additional voices ===
- William Callaway – Lowbrow (in "What Now, Lowbrow")
- Henry Corden – Mr. Hyde/Willie the Weasel (in "Everyone Hyde"), Prophet (in "The Prophet Profits")
- Regis Cordic
- Joan Gerber – Queen Hornet (in "The Queen Hornet," "The Injustice League of America")
- Bob Holt – Manyfaces (in "Sinister Symphony")
- Casey Kasem – Norville "Shaggy" Rogers (in "Everyone Hyde," "What Now, Lowbrow," "The Wizard of Ooze"), Professor Orville (in "Everyone Hyde"), Lowbrow's Henchman (in "What Now, Lowbrow"), Fishface (in "The Harbor Robber"), Swamp Rat (in "The Wizard of Ooze")
- Julie McWhirter – Prophet's Henchwomen (in "The Prophet Profits")
- Allan Melvin – Superthug (in "The Injustice League of America"), Grub (in "The Day and Nightcrawler")
- Don Messick – Scooby-Doo (in "Everyone Hyde", "What Now, Lowbrow", "The Wizard of Ooze"), Jeweler (in "Everyone Hyde"), Gimmick's Henchmen (in "The Great Brain...Train Robbery"), Mumbly (in "The Great Brain...Train Robbery"), Lowbrow (in "What Now, Lowbrow," "The Injustice League of America"), Lowbrow's Henchman (in "What Now, Lowbrow"), Gimmick (in "The Injustice League of America")
- Heather North – Daphne Blake (in "Everyone Hyde," "What Now, Lowbrow," "The Wizard of Ooze")
- John Stephenson – Chief Grisby, Gimmick's Henchmen (in "The Great Brain...Train Robbery"), Chief Wiggins (in "The Great Brain...Train Robbery"), Fishface's Henchmen (in "The Harbor Robber"), Manyfaces' Henchmen (in "Sinister Symphony"), Eric von Flick (in "Tin Kong"), Red Vulture (in "The Blue Falcon vs. the Red Vulture"), Blimp (in "Lighter Than Air Raid"), Glob's Henchmen (in "The Glob"), Shadowman/Herman Twitch (in "Shadowman")
- Vic Perrin – Gimmick (in "The Great Brain...Train Robbery")
- Pat Stevens – Velma Dinkley (in "Everyone Hyde," "What Now, Lowbrow," "The Wizard of Ooze")
- Lennie Weinrib – Gimmick's Henchmen (in "The Great Brain...Train Robbery"), Prince (in "The Great Brain...Train Robbery"), Roto-Chopper (in "The Day and Nightcrawler"), Superthug (in "Don't Bug Superthug")

== Broadcast history ==
Dynomutt, Dog Wonder originally aired in these following formats on ABC and NBC:

- The Scooby-Doo/Dynomutt Hour (September 11, 1976 – November 27, 1976, ABC)
- The Scooby-Doo/Dynomutt Show (December 4, 1976 – September 3, 1977, ABC)
- Scooby's All-Star Laff-A-Lympics (as The Blue Falcon & Dynomutt) (September 10, 1977 – March 11, 1978, ABC)
- Dynomutt, Dog Wonder (June 3, 1978 – September 2, 1978, ABC) (rerun)
- The Godzilla/Dynomutt Hour (September 27, 1980 – November 15, 1980, NBC) (rerun)

Dynomutt also aired on USA Cartoon Express during the 1980s.

The show was shown on Cartoon Network during the 1990s and 2000s.

Between January 2 and March 9, 2008, repeats of Dynomutt, Dog Wonder were shown on Boomerang. On June 4, 2009, Dynomutt, Dog Wonder returned to Boomerang and aired Thursdays through Sundays at 10am Eastern. It returned on June 3, 2010, and remained until September 6, 2010, and again a year later, on July 1, 2011. Since September 4, 2011, the show stopped airing on Boomerang due to the re-branding that happened on January 19, 2015, that also removed many other older shows.

From November 16 to November 20, 2026, the show was aired on MeTV Toons' block called "Cartoon Carousel".

== Home media ==
All 16 episodes of the first season were released in a DVD set The Scooby-Doo/Dynomutt Hour: The Complete Series from Warner Home Video.

== Blue Falcon ==
Radley Crown
- Dynomutt, Dog Wonder and Scooby-Doo character
- First appearance: "Everyone Hyde!"; Dynomutt, Dog Wonder; September 11, 1976
- Created by: Joe Ruby; Ken Spears
- Voiced by: Gary Owens (1976–2004); Maurice LaMarche (Harvey Birdman, Attorney at Law); Kevin Shinick (Robot Chicken); Troy Baker (Scooby-Doo! Mystery Incorporated); Jeff Bennett (Scooby-Doo! Mask of the Blue Falcon); Diedrich Bader (Scooby-Doo! Mask of the Blue Falcon); Mark Wahlberg (SCOOB!); David Kaye (Scooby-Doo and Guess Who?); Rob Riggle (Jellystone!)

In-universe information
- Nicknames: Antonio de Rivera Garcia Azul Falcón; Owen Garrison; Brad Adams
- Species: Human
- Gender: Male
- Significant other: Dynomutt
- Relatives: Brian Crown (son)

=== Appearances ===
==== Television series ====
- Gary Owens and Frank Welker reprise their roles of the Blue Falcon and Dynomutt in the Dexter's Laboratory episode "Dyno-Might". The Blue Falcon comes to Dexter when Dynomutt is heavily damaged during their fight with the supervillain Buzzord. Though Dexter obliges, Dynomutt destroys his laboratory, leading to Dexter deactivating Dynomutt and creating Dynomutt X-90 (also voiced by Welker), who becomes a fanatical vigilante using excessive and lethal force to deal with minor crimes such as parking violations, jaywalking, and littering. Dexter tries to help the Blue Falcon stop Dynomutt X-90, but after being cornered, Dexter reveals he built Dynomutt X-90 because he deemed the original a goofy sidekick. The Blue Falcon objects to Dexter's treatment of Dynomutt and reactivates the original Dynomutt, who helps Dexter deactivate Dynomutt X-90.
- Dynomutt makes a cameo appearance in a photograph in an episode of Super Secret Secret Squirrel.
- The Blue Falcon appears in the Johnny Bravo episode "Johnny Makeover", voiced again by Gary Owens.
- The Blue Falcon appears in Harvey Birdman, Attorney at Law, voiced by Maurice LaMarche. This version is a Spanish lawyer named Antonio de Rivera Garcia Azul Falcón. A similarly Spanish-accented Dynomutt appears in the two-part episode "Deadomutt", voiced by André Sogliuzzo.
- Blue Falcon and Dynomutt appear in the Robot Chicken episode "Ban on the Fun", respectively voiced by Kevin Shinick and Victor Yerrid.
- Blue Falcon and Dynomutt, named Reggie, appear in the Scooby-Doo! Mystery Incorporated episode "Heart of Evil", respectively voiced by Troy Baker and Frank Welker. These versions were originally security guards at Quest Labs. After a robot dragon attacked Reggie, Benton Quest rebuilt him as a cyborg dog. While Dynomutt retains his personality from the original series, the Blue Falcon is depicted as a gritty and violent vigilante reminiscent of Batman in Frank Miller's The Dark Knight Returns.
- Dynomutt and Blue Falcon appear in the Scooby-Doo and Guess Who? episode "Scooby-Doo, Dog Wonder!", with Blue Falcon voiced by David Kaye impersonating Gary Owens while Frank Welker reprises his role as Dynomutt.
- Dynomutt and Blue Falcon appear in the Jellystone! episode "Heroes and Capes", with Blue Falcon voiced by Rob Riggle and Dynomutt having no dialogue.

==== Films ====
- Blue Falcon and Dynomutt appear in Scooby-Doo! Mask of the Blue Falcon, with Welker reprising his role of Dynomutt once more. The duo was redesigned to be a film-within-a-film with two different iterations of the Blue Falcon. Owen Garrison (voiced by Jeff Bennett) is the star of the original TV series, who became embittered by Hollywood for rebooting his show as a dark and gritty film with actor Brad Adams (voiced by Diedrich Bader) in the lead role with his own version of Dynomutt (vocal effects provided by Fred Tatasciore). Jack Rabble (voiced by Fred Tatasciore) uses the identity of the Blue Falcon's arch-enemy Mr. Hyde (voiced by John DiMaggio) to commit a daring heist before being foiled by Garrison and Scooby-Doo. By the end of the film, a sequel to the gritty Blue Falcon movie was made featuring both Blue Falcons with Owen Garrison's Blue Falcon being the long-lost father of Brad Adams' Blue Falcon.
- The Blue Falcon and Dynomutt appear in Scoob!, respectively voiced by Mark Wahlberg and Ken Jeong. The Radley Crown version of Blue Falcon has retired to Palm Beach, Florida, with his son Brian becoming the second Blue Falcon. Dynomutt is depicted as being more mature and competent due to an involuntary upgrade given to him by Brian. During the credits, Blue Falcon recruits Atom Ant, Captain Caveman, Jabberjaw, and Grape Ape into the Falcon Force.
- The Scoob! incarnations of Blue Falcon and Dynomutt make cameo appearances in Space Jam: A New Legacy.

==== Comics ====
- From November 1977 to September 1978, Marvel Comics published a bimonthly Dynomutt comic book series that lasted for six issues.
- Ongoing series Cartoon Network Presents #21 (May 1999) featured a story starring Dynomutt and the Blue Falcon. It was written by Dan Slott with art by Manny Galan and Mike DeCarlo.
- As part of a series of crossovers featuring DC and Hanna-Barbera characters together, DC launched Super-Sons/Dynomutt Special #1 in May 2018. The issue was written by Peter Tomasi with art by Fernando Pasarin.
- In July 2024, it was announced that a Dynomutt, Dog Wonder comic from Dynamite Entertainment is in the works. The Blue Falcon and Dynomutt was released in September 2025 with the final issue # 5 being released in 2026.

== See also ==
- List of works produced by Hanna-Barbera Productions
- Inspector Gadget
- Mega Man
- Casshan
