= The Girl with Something Extra =

American fantasy sitcom (1973–1974)

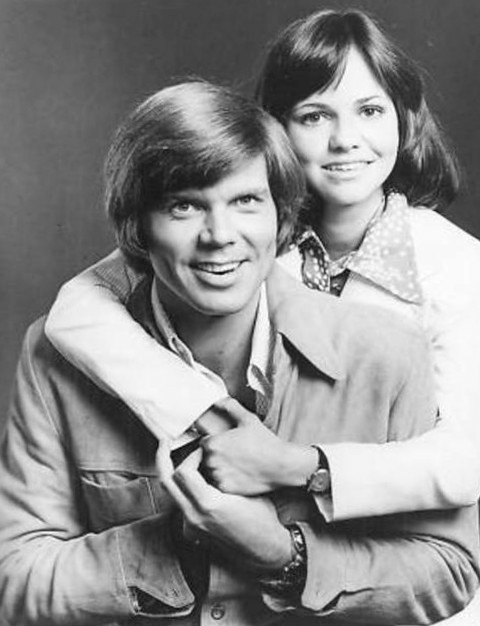
- Series stars Sally Field and John Davidson, 1973
- Genre: Fantasy/Sitcom
- Created by: Bernard Slade
- Written by: Stan Cutler; Bill Davenport; Lou Derman; Bernard Slade
- Directed by: Bob Claver; Roger Duchowny; Herman Hoffman; Richard Kinon; William Wiard
- Starring: Sally Field; John Davidson; Teri Garr; Henry Jones; Zohra Lampert
- Composer: Dave Grusin
- Country of origin: United States
- Original language: English
- No. of seasons: 1
- No. of episodes: 22

Production
- Executive producer: Bob Claver
- Producers: Larry Rosen; Mel Swope
- Running time: 30 minutes
- Production companies: Thornhill Productions; Screen Gems

Original release
- Network: NBC
- Release: September 14, 1973 – March 15, 1974

The Girl with Something Extra is an American fantasy sitcom television series that aired on NBC from September 14, 1973 to March 15, 1974 with a total of 22 episodes over 1 season. The series was created by Bernard Slade and produced by Screen Gems.

== Plot ==
The show revolves around newlywed couple John and Sally Burton after John discovers that Sally has ESP and can read other people's minds. Sally's ESP became less of a plot point as the season progressed.

== Cast ==
- Sally Field as Sally Burton
- John Davidson as John Burton
- Jack Sheldon as Jerry Burton
- Zohra Lampert as Anne
- Stephanie Edwards as Angela
- Henry Jones as Owen Metcalf
- Teri Garr as Amber
- William Windom as Stuart Kline

== Episodes ==
No.	Title	Directed by	Written by	Original release date
1	"Sally on My Mind"	Bob Claver	Bernard Slade	September 14, 1973
At an outdoor fair, John Burton (John Davidson) is smitten with a pretty girl. He's trying to think of a way to ask her out. Just then the girl, Sally (Sally Field), tells him she's available the next night. They have a nice time on their date. Sally goes to John's place of business. There she meets Segram (Charles Lane), a senior partner of the firm. It's not long before Sally and John get married. On the wedding night, John realizes that Sally has ESP and can read minds. She didn't tell him sooner as she was afraid of losing him. John's not sure the marriage will work and he leaves. John goes to see his brother, Jerry (Jack Sheldon). He tells Jerry about Sally's power. John decides he loves Sally and goes back to her. John wants to know things that bother Sally about him.
2	"Everything You Wanted to Hide and Couldn't"	Bob Claver	Bernard Slade	September 21, 1973
While John is kissing Sally, she realizes he's thinking about Annette Funicello. Sally gets upset, but John says he just saw her on TV. The next morning, Sally pretends to have Mouseketeer ears on. Sally says that women fantasize, so why shouldn't men. John wants to know who Sally fantasizes about. At work, Owen Metcalf (Henry Jones) tells John that marriage is a two way street. When John gets home, Sally tells him his brother Jerry called. John and Sally get into a fight. John goes to Jerry's to play poker. Jerry also says marriage takes some adjusting. Back at home, Sally and John apologize to each other. But there are still things that need to be settled. The next night they have some couples over. Sally can tell that Jerry's girlfriend Stephanie actually likes John. The night doesn't go well for Sally. Sally and John have a heart to heart.
3	"A Gift for the Gifted"	Richard Kinon	Warren S. Murray	September 28, 1973
It's Sally's birthday tomorrow. John knows what he wants to get her, a garnet necklace. He asks his brother Jerry how he can hide it from her, when she can read his mind. Jerry suggests that John fill his mind with a lot of trivia. Sally still knows about the necklace. John is disappointed that he can't surprise Sally. John comes up with a plan. He'll have his friend Anne (Zohra Lampert) by a gift for Sally and not tell him what it is. Anne tells Jerry she wants to throw a surprise birthday party for Sally. Jerry is not to say anything to John about it. The next morning, John tells Sally that he made plans that evening for her birthday. Jerry lets it slip to John about the party. It takes quite a bit of doing, but Jerry and Anne get Sally to the club for her party. Sally is also surprised with the gift from John. The next morning, John is a little hung over. Liam Dunn as The Watchman. Stephanie Edwards as Angela.
4	"How Green Was Las Vegas"	Richard Kinon	Bernard Slade	October 5, 1973
John has to go to Las Vegas on a business trip and Sally is going with. John mentions that Jerry is there performing. In Vegas, Sally takes in one of Jerry's shows. He's singing and playing trumpet. Jerry tells Sally he has the chance to lead his own band, but he needs $5000. He wants her to use her ESP to win at gambling. Sally says that her ESP doesn't work with everyone. Sally winds up winning $5200. John runs into her and says he's against the way she won the money. He wants to lose the money back. They wind up legitimately winning even more money. They are taken to see the Casino Manager (Mark Lenard). John tells him how Sally used ESP initially and how they were trying to lose the money back. The Manager doesn't believe them. Sally finds a way to have the Manager help them lose the money. John will co-sign a loan for Jerry. Eddie Carroll as Second Dealer. Farrah Fawcett as Ginger. Eddie Ryder as First Dealer.
5	"All the Nude That's Fit to Print"	Richard Kinon	Bernard Slade	October 12, 1973
John and Sally are on the beach. Sally would like to go to Hawaii, but John says they don't have the money. Sally goes to get something to eat. A Kelly Handley (Corinne Camacho) comes up to John and offers him $500 to take off his clothes. She explains that she wants him to be a nude centerfold in a women's magazine. He says he couldn't do it as he's a lawyer. She gives him her card and tells him to think about it. Sally isn't against the idea, because of the money. At the office, John was hoping to land the new client's case. Owen Metcalf thinks John's to conservative for the client, who is a bit of a swinger. John decides to take Kelly up on her offer and calls her. Sally is a little bothered that Kelly will be the photographer. Sally also is surprised at how excited Anne is about John posing nude. John fantasizes about being very popular after the magazine comes out. He's even interviewed by Merv Griffin. Sally now has second thoughts about John doing it. John comes home from Kelly's studio and says there were four guys there auditioning. He didn't get the job. Hope Summers as Stella.
6	"John & Sally & Fred & Linda"	Bob Claver	Stan Cutler	October 19, 1973
Sally is working at Anne's antique shop. While there, a Linda Fowler (Diana Ewing) introduces herself to Sally. They apparently went to high school together, but Sally doesn't remember her at first. After Linda says her nickname was "Bubbles", Sally remembers her. They both are recently married. They agree to get together with their husbands. At the Fowler home, Sally and John meet Linda's husband, Fred (Pat Harrington Jr.). After dinner, Fred wants to show movies and then show off his cactus collection. Back at home, Sally and John can't believe how boring the evening was. The next day, Fred and Linda bring Sally and John a cactus. Fred invites them out to dinner. It's another boring evening. Jerry comes by with his friend Mimi (Carol Wayne). Knowing they'll have to invite the Fowlers over one evening, John asks Jerry to come. They invite Anne as well, but it's still a boring evening with the Fowlers. Jerry thinks he has a way of scaring the Fowlers off. He asks them to go nude swimming, but they say yes. After a few days, the Fowlers tell Sally and John that they want to spend time with other friends.
7	"One of Our Hens Is Missing"	Bob Claver	Stan Cutler	October 26, 1973
Sally reads that a most normal couples will have a major fight within three months of their marriage. The doorbell rings and John figures it's his brother with a woman. It is Jerry and he's with Amber (Teri Garr). Jerry gives John a package that their mom sent. Every year mom sends John a chocolate hen. That night John looks in the refrigerator and his hen is missing. Sally didn't know John cared about it and gave it to the little boy next door. John tries not to make a big deal out of it, but he is upset. Anne comes by and can tell John and Sally were fighting. John leaves and stays at Jerry's house. Jerry had a fight with Amber. Amber threw out his teddy bear, Snuffles. Anne tries to get Sally to understand how John feels. Amber comes back to Jerry's place and at first thinks John is another woman. John goes home and Sally bought him a chocolate bunny, because she couldn't find a hen. John and Sally make up.
8	"No Benefit of Doubt"	E.W. Swackhamer	Story by : Dick Bensfield & Perry Grant, Teleplay by : Stan Cutler	November 2, 1973
John tells Sally that he will be trying his first case in court. Later, they tell Jerry and Anne. John will be defending a little old lady accused of shoplifting. John comes home after the first day of the trial and says things went very well. Sally tells him that Anne and her will close the store and come watch the second day. The Prosecutor, Mr. Everett (William Schallert), is questioning the security officer of the store, Mr. Bonner (Joseph V. Perry). Bonner claims he saw Mrs. Clarke (Meg Wyllie) take the watch. John objects and tells the Judge (Peggy McCay) that no watch was found in Mrs. Clarke's possession. Sally reads Mrs. Clarke's mind and learns that she is guilty. Sally doesn't know what to do. Anne suggests she doesn't say anything. At the office, Owen Metcalf tells Sally and John that he won his first case. Owen is confident with John. Mr. Everett gives his closing summary. Something John says in his summary, gives Sally her decision. She has the bailiff give John a note saying Mrs. Clarke's guilty. John mouths to Sally that he knows. Mrs. Clarke is found guilty and but the Judge suspends her sentence. Owen is very happy with John's performance. Reva Rose as Miss K.
9	"And Baby Makes Two"	Leo Penn	Stan Cutler	November 9, 1973
Jerry and Anne are having dinner at Sally and John's place. Despite being unmarried, Anne says she wants to have a baby. Anne doesn't want to adopt, she wants to have the baby. She just needs to find the father. Jerry is disappointed when Anne doesn't want him to be the father. Anne tells John her requirements in a man. She would like to find someone like him. Sally is jealous that John is faltered by what Anne said. Anne can sense that something is bothering Sally. At the office, John is about to meet with Foster Langworth (John Gabriel). Sally comes by and apologizes to John. Sally thinks Foster should meet Anne. At dinner, Anne, Sally and John ask Foster a lot of personal questions and he wonders why. Foster mentions that he's not the type of guy that could father a child and just walk away. Anne realizes that she would want the man to stay around as well. Ysabel MacCloskey as Lady Shopper. Pat Stevens as Marian.
10	"It's So Peaceful in the Country"	Robert Scheerer	Steve Zacharias	November 23, 1973
John, Sally, Jerry and Anne are going on a weekend cabin trip. They go as far as they can with the car and they have to walk the rest of the way to the cabin. It starts to rain. They get to the cabin and it's not as nice as they hoped it would be. But then they see the bedroom and it's luxurious. Jerry comes back from the car with some more bags. He also brought along a woman named Taffy (Yvonne Wilder). John and Sally are in the bedroom, when a guy comes in wanting to borrow the radio. John and Sally now find a couple, Sudy (Patti Deutsch) and Bruno (Rick Hurst), have joined them. Their tent got washed away. Then there's a knock on the door. It's a Ranger named Lew Grant (Michael Bell). His jeep slid off the road into a tree. Sally tells John that one of those people robbed a local bank, but she doesn't know who. John thinks it's Sudy and Bruno and they have a large bag with them. Sudy and Bruno claim they just got married, against her father's wishes. Now John thinks it's Taffy and tells the Ranger. Grant borrows Jerry's car to get help. They figure out the robber isn't Taffy and assume it's Grant. Sally tells the others about her ESP and what she thought. A Policeman (Ken Swofford) comes by. He says he caught Grant and brought Jerry's car back.
11	"Sugar and Spice and Quarterback Sneak"	Bob Claver	Dale McRaven	November 30, 1973
John comes home late and finds Sally gone and Jerry in the house. Sally went to the airport to pick up Jody. Jerry wants to meet Jody until John says she's Sally's 12 year old niece. Sally and Jody come home. John is surprised that Jody is a bit of a tomboy. John doesn't think Jody should be playing football with the boys. Jerry comes by and introduces Cee Cee (Victoria Carroll) to John and Sally. Cee Cee is a stripper. John gets upset when Jody comes home with a scraped arm. The next morning, Jody says she should go home because John doesn't like that she's a tomboy. John assures her that he does like her, he just doesn't want her to get hurt. Jody says she wants to be a woman, she just doesn't know how. Sally has to work, so she has John go dress shopping with Jody. Jody finds some nice things and has a good time with John. Things don't well when John talks to Jody about love. Sally thinks Jody has a crush on John. John works things out with Jody and everyone's happy. Pat Stevens as Saleslady #2.
12	"Mind-ing Mama"	Roger Duchowny	Stan Cutler	December 7, 1973
Sally is to meet John's mother, Betsy Burton (Jeff Donnell), for the first time. Betsy seems to be thrilled to see Sally. Sally tells John she can read Betsy's mind and she is determined to dislike Sally. At home, Jerry comes by to say hello to Betsy before he goes to a job with his band. Sally wants to use her ESP to find a way to get on Betsy's good side. The next day they go to Anne's store. Sally reads Betsy's mind and gives her a plate she really liked. Sally prepares a dinner from a recipe in Betsy's mind. Jerry lets it slip that Sally has ESP. Betsy decides she can't stay there anymore and wants to go to Jerry's. The next day, a Messenger (Corey Fischer) drops off a package that has the plate that Sally gave Betsy. Jerry tells John and Sally that Betsy's is going home that evening. Jerry and John have dinner with Betsy and her and John make up. Betsy says she can't face Sally because of the bad things she originally thought of her. John had planned for Sally to show up. Sally is delayed because she got stopped by a Policeman (Ronnie Schell) for speeding. At the bus station, Sally arrives and gets on Betsy's bus. They have a nice talk and come to an understanding.
13	"A Meeting of Minds"	William Wiard	Stan Cutler	December 21, 1973
Anne can tell something's bothering Sally. Sally says that John is tired of being dull and predictable. Anne suggests going to a sensitivity session. Sally tells John that she invited Anne and Jerry and their dates over for this evening. That night Jerry brings Kitty and Anne brings Arthur (Jack Riley). Arthur mentions all the things he doesn't like. John says that because Sally has ESP, she finds him predictable. John thinks Sally should tell him her every thought. Sally tells everyone she regrets the idea of the sensitivity session. At the office, Secretary Angela mentions to John that it's Thursday. John always wears his brown suit on Thursdays. Something that Owen says, implies that John is predictable. Jerry and Sally think that John is going to parachute out of a plane to prove he can be impulsive. They see a guy jump out of a plane, but it turns out to be Arthur. Something that Angela says makes John feel better about being predictable. John and Sally realize they like each other the way they are.
14	"Guess Who's Feeding the Pigeons"	Roger Duchowny	Bill Davenport & Lou Derman	January 11, 1974
Sally is in the park. She befriends an old man named Victor Lucas (Keenan Wynn), who was feeding pigeons. Sally invites Victor to dinner. That night, Jerry and Anne are over. When Sally says the man's name is Victor Lucas, the others recognize the name and he was a mob boss in town. Two men come to the door and look around. Then Victor comes in and sends them out. They have a nice evening and Victor all but admits about his past. The next day, client Mr. McClintoch (Gordon Jump) comes by the office to see John. He wants to drop his personal injury case. John figures Victor had something to do with it. Victor invites Sally and John to dinner. Back at home, Detectives Flavin (Gary Crosby) and Connors (Ron Pinkard) come to the door. They question John and Sally about their association with Victor. John's boss threatens to fire him if he keeps seeing Victor. John and Sally can't get out of going to Victor's birthday party. Victor understands the situation John and Sally are in and will stop seeing them. Cosmo Sardo as Barber.
15	"The Greening of Aunt Fran"	Richard Kinon	Stan Cutler	January 18, 1974
Sally is anxious about her Aunt Fran Harrison (Eve Arden) visiting. Sally tells John that Fran is quite the flamboyant world traveler. Fran arrives with a police escort. Fran brought with a lot of luggage and some animals. A man comes by and hands Fran a summons. A Japanese Gentleman then comes by and claims he represents Mr. Akimitsu (Jerry Fujikawa). He would like Fran to contact Mr. Akimitsu very soon. At the office, John tells his boss, Stuart Kline (William Windom), that Fran has inherited an interest in a pearl bed in the Orient. However, the title isn't very clear. John would like to look into it. Sally comes by and introduces Fran to Stuart. Sally invites Stuart to dinner. Fran goes to Anne's shop to put some jewelry on consignment. At dinner, Fran and Stuart get along very well. After Stuart leaves, Fran says she might marry Stuart. Fran and Stuart spend a lot of time together. Sally finds out that Fran is broke. She wonders if Fran wants to marry Stuart for his money. John meets with Mr. Akimitsu hoping to settle things with the pearl bed. John is able to get a large settlement for Fran and she decides to leave. Stuart says he'll be alright.
16	"The Cost of Giving"	William Wiard	Gordon Mitchell & Lloyd Turner	January 25, 1974
At Anne's store, Sally reminds Jerry and Anne about coming over for dinner the next night. It's Sally and John's six month anniversary. There's a first edition book that Sally wants to get for John. Despite loving it, she's going to sell her great-grandmother's brooch. Mrs. Elkins (Jayne Meadows) comes by with her daughter, Denise (Nellie Bellflower). Mrs. Elkins gives Sally a check for the brooch. Sally, Anne and Jerry go to an auction. The Auctioneer (Carl Ballantine) starts the bidding for the book Sally wants. There is a man (Ron Feinberg) that is also bidding on the book. Sally can read his mind and learns he really wants the book. Using some deception, Jerry gets the man to stop bidding. Sally gives John the book and he loves it. The next day, John shows Jerry a chain he got for Sally's brooch. Though he wasn't supposed to say anything, Jerry tells him that Sally sold the brooch. John wants to get the brooch back. John is finally able to track down Mrs. Elkins when he learns that Jerry had Denise's phone number. Mrs. Elkins turns John down as she gave the brooch to Denise as a birthday present. Jerry tells Denise there's a curse on the brooch and she gives it to him. Ivor Barry as Butler. Brad Savage as Little Boy Scott. Robert B. Williams as Bidder #1.
17	"A Zircon in the Rough"	Alan Rafkin	Jim Fritzell & Everett Greenbaum	February 1, 1974
Sally mentions to John and Jerry that she invited elegant Samantha Carrington (Joan Van Ark) to dinner on Friday night. Sally needs to find a date for Samantha. Jerry volunteers, but John says she's a society girl and not his type. Jerry is a little hurt. John and Sally feel bad and ask Jerry to come to the dinner. Samantha is at Anne's shop. She mentions a new gallery she is opening. Outside, Samantha literally bumps into Jerry. It's awkward and she leaves. When he finds out from Sally that was Samantha, he worries about what he'll talk to her about. Jerry tries to learn about the things Samantha is interested in. Amber comes by to see Jerry, but all he can do is think about Samantha. It's the night of the dinner and Jerry comes by all worried. Samantha arrives. The evening actually goes very well for Jerry. Jerry drives Samantha to her hotel. Later, Jerry tells John and Sally that Samantha came on to him at the hotel.
18	"The Sour Grapevine"	Richard Kinon	Stan Cutler	February 8, 1974
Sally tells Jerry and Anne that John is working on a divorce case. The husband is cheating with his secretary. Jerry and Anne see John leaving his building with his secretary Angela. At the office, Jerry confronts Angela and hints at John being taken. John's boss Stuart Kline mentions that Angela's been preoccupied lately. John comes home late and says he had a drink with Angela. Angela is thinking of going into real estate and John is helping her study for her exam. Later, Sally tells John that Jerry is under the impression that he and Angela are an item. The next day, John wishes Angela luck on her exam. Miss Kay (Reva Rose) suggests to Stuart that John and Angela are having an affair. John tries to tell Stuart there is nothing going on between him and Angela. Stuart is going to fire Angela. John tells Sally that he's going to threaten to quit to get Stuart to keep Angela. Sally even tells Stuart that she knows about the rumors and they're not true. Stuart will keep Angela. Angela passes the exam but decides to stay a secretary. Charlie Brill as The Mister. Mitzi McCall as The Missus. Pat Stevens as Secretary #1.
19	"Irreconcilable Sameness"	John Erman	Bill Davenport & Lou Derman	February 15, 1974
Sally is expecting her mother, Margaret (Audra Lindley), for a visit. When Margaret arrives, she brings with Sally's father, William (Donald O'Connor). William announces that they're moving to California. They also announce that they're separating. After 30 years of marriage, they need something else for excitement. Sally suggests to John that they get Jerry to set her parents up with dates. Hopefully that will bring them back to their senses. Margaret asks Sally some dating advice. Anne comes by with Fred Courtney (Mark Roberts). He is to be Margaret's date. Jerry arrives with Irene, who is to be William's date. William and Margaret come home from their dates and things seem to be fine. The next day, Jerry lets it slip that William had a miserable time on his date. Sally tells John that she feels that her mother didn't have a good time either. Sally sets her parents up on a blind date with each other. William is at a bar while he waits for his date. A woman named Jackie (Kristina Holland) starts talking to him. Margaret sees this and interrupts them. Margaret and William realize that they should stay together. James McCallion as Byron Canfield.
20	"Three for the Road"	Bob Claver	Stan Cutler	February 22, 1974
John has been working very hard. Sally thinks he should tell Owen Metcalf he wants the weekend off. Owen wants John to go to San Diego to see Mr. Yarbrough (Byron Morrow) to have him sign a contract. Sally should go with as Yarbrough likes to meet the wives. John would basically see Yarbrough for an hour. Then he and Sally could have the rest of the weekend on their own. Jerry drives John and Sally to the airport. The Airline Rep (Maureen Reagan) tells them the plane's been delayed. Jerry goes along. In San Diego, their bags get lost. Their reservation at the hotel was cancelled because of a convention. Jerry knows a place they can go to. The Desk Clerk (Woodrow Parfrey) tells them they will have to share one room. Jerry goes to a bar. John and Sally go to a restaurant. When he goes to pay the Cashier (Len Lesser), John discovers his wallet is gone. When they get back to the hotel, Jerry had let a woman named Gerta (Susan Silo) into their room. The next morning, they get a call that their bags were found. John says they'll pick them up. They have to hitch a ride to the airport. Their bags were sent to another hotel. They finally get to Yarbrough's home and get the contract signed. Bruce Kimmel as The Messenger.
21	"The Not So Good Samaritan"	Bob Claver	Stan Cutler	March 8, 1974
Jerry and Kiki are over at Sally and John's place. It's very late and John gets them to leave. The next day Sally and Anne are walking down the street. Mailman Lionel (Don Knotts) stops Sally from falling in a large hole in the street. For saving her life, Sally invites Lionel over to dinner. That night, Lionel tells Sally that he got fired because he didn't finish his route on time. John comes home looking forward to a quiet evening. John then sees Lionel. Lionel tells them about all the tough breaks he's had lately. He couldn't pay his rent so he lost his apartment. John invites him to stay overnight. It's been three days. Jerry would like to give Lionel some confidence by having him go out with Amber. John and Sally take Lionel and Amber on a picnic. In the park, Lionel sees a woman looking at him from the bushes and he tells the others he has to leave. The woman, Eleanor (Arlene Golonka), gives Sally an engagement ring that Lionel had given her. Eleanor does care for Lionel, but he just has no confidence. Sally gets Lionel to agree to the marriage. They have the ceremony at John and Sally's place and Lionel gets his confidence back.
22	"The New Broom"	Richard Kinon	Stan Cutler	March 15, 1974
Jerry and Anne are over for dinner. Sally tells them that John is doing some volunteer work for a citizens group. John comes home and says he's one of eight people that the group wants to run as candidate for city council. John doesn't know if he'd have time to do it. The next morning Sally convinces John that if he were picked, he should run. At the office, Owen Metcalf tells John that he heard the list is down to four and he's still on it. Jerry asks Angela if she'd help campaign for John. Norman Morgan (Dick Van Patten) is speaking to John about being his campaign manager. Morgan wants to have lunch with Sally the next day. Sally read Morgan's mind and learns that he's going to deposit a check for $25,000. Sally wonders where he would get that type of money. Owen calls John and says the list is down to two people and John is still in. At lunch, Morgan tells Sally what is expected of a candidate's wife. Morgan has John meet with Mr. Brannigan (Arch Johnson), Mr. Linnet (David Lewis) and Mr. Peters (Albert Popwell). They are potential backers. After speaking with John, they decide that he's the candidate. John decides to drop out of the race, because he didn't like some of the men's ideals.

== Reception ==
Despite airing after the popular Sanford and Son on Friday nights on NBC, the show failed to find an audience and was canceled at the end of the season because of low ratings. The show ranked 59th out of 80 shows that season with a 15.2 rating. A total of 22 half-hour episodes were produced.

== Syndication ==
The show aired reruns on GetTV from 2017 to 2018, also seen on Decades (now Catchy Comedy) as part of their "Sally Field Binge" (along with The Flying Nun and Gidget), and also aired on MeTV+ until its removal in 2025.

== Award nominations ==
Year	Award	Result	Category	Recipient
2004	TV Land Award	Nominated	Superlatively Supernatural	Sally Field
