= The Scooby-Doo/Dynomutt Hour =

- Genre: Superhero; Comedy
- Created by: Joe Ruby; Ken Spears
- Developed by: Ray Parker
- Directed by: Ray Patterson; Carl Urbano; Charles A. Nichols
- Voices of: Don Messick; Casey Kasem; Heather North; Alan Oppenheimer; Pat Stevens; Frank Welker; Gary Owens; Larry McCormick; Ron Feinberg
- Narrated by: Ron Feinberg
- Composer: Hoyt Curtin
- Country of origin: United States
- No. of episodes: 16

Production
- Executive producers: William Hanna; Joseph Barbera
- Producers: Bob Singer; Iwao Takamoto; Don Jurwich; Alex Lovy; Art Scott
- Running time: 60 minutes (two half-hour segments, Sept.–Nov. 1976); 90 minutes (three half-hour segments, Nov.–Dec. 1976)
- Production company: Hanna-Barbera Productions

Original release
- Network: ABC
- Release: September 11 – December 18, 1976

The Scooby-Doo/Dynomutt Hour is a 60-minute package show produced by Hanna-Barbera Productions in 1976 for ABC Saturday mornings. It marked the first new installments of the cowardly canine since 1973, and contained two animated segments: The Scooby-Doo Show and Dynomutt, Dog Wonder.

== Voice cast ==
- Frank Welker – Dynomutt, Fred Jones (in "Everyone Hyde," "What Now, Lowbrow," "The Wizard of Ooze"), Bugsy Busby (in "The Day and Nightcrawler")
- Gary Owens – the Blue Falcon/Radley Crown
- Ron Feinberg – F.O.C.U.S. One, Narrator, Mudmouth (in "The Wizard of Ooze"), Worm (in "The Day and Night Crawler," "The Injustice League of America")
- Larry McCormick – the Mayor of Big City

=== Additional voices ===
- Henry Corden – Mr. Hyde/Willie the Weasel (in "Everyone Hyde"), the Prophet (in "The Prophet Profits")
- Regis Cordic
- Joan Gerber – Queen Hornet (in "The Queen Hornet," "The Injustice League of America")
- Bob Holt – Manyfaces (in "Sinister Symphony")
- Casey Kasem – Norville "Shaggy" Rogers (in "Everyone Hyde," "What Now, Lowbrow," "The Wizard of Ooze"), Fishface (in "The Harbor Robber"), Swamp Rat (in "The Wizard of Ooze"), Lowbrow's Henchman (in "What Now, Lowbrow"), Professor Orville (in "Everyone Hyde")
- Julie McWhirter – Prophet's Henchwomen (in "The Prophet Profits")
- Allan Melvin – Superthug (second time), Grub (in "The Day and Nightcrawler")
- Don Messick – Scooby-Doo, Mumbly (in "The Great Brain...Train Robbery"), Gimmick (in "The Injustice League of America"), Lowbrow (in "What Now, Lowbrow," "The Injustice League of America"), Lowbrow's Henchman (in "What Now, Lowbrow"), Gimmick's Henchmen (in "The Great Brain...Train Robbery"), Jeweler (in "Everyone Hyde")
- Heather North – Daphne Blake (in "Everyone Hyde," "What Now, Lowbrow," "The Wizard of Ooze")
- John Stephenson – Chief Grisby, Chief Wiggins (in "The Great Brain...Train Robbery"), Blimp (in "Lighter Than Air Raid"), Eric von Flick (in "Tin Kong"), Shadowman/Herman Twitch (in "Shadowman"), Red Vulture (in "The Blue Falcon vs. the Red Vulture"), the Glob's Henchmen (in "The Glob"), Fishface's Henchmen (in "The Harbor Robber"), Gimmick's Henchmen (in "The Great Brain...Train Robbery"), Manyfaces' Henchmen (in "Sinister Symphony")
- Pat Stevens – Velma Dinkley (in "Everyone Hyde," "What Now, Lowbrow," "The Wizard of Ooze")
- Lennie Weinrib – Superthug (first time), Roto-Chopper (in "The Day and Nightcrawler"), Prince (in "The Great Brain...Train Robbery"), Gimmick's Henchmen (in "The Great Brain...Train Robbery")
- Alan Oppenheimer as Scooby-Dum

== Production ==
The Scooby-Doo/Dynomutt Hour debuted on September 11, 1976. After two months, an additional 30 minutes were added to the hour-long series (to accommodate repeats of the first two CBS seasons of Scooby-Doo, Where Are You!), becoming the 90-minute Scooby-Doo/Dynomutt Show, which is how it remained from December 4, 1976 to September 3, 1977.

Like many animated series created by Hanna-Barbera in the 1970s, the show contained a laugh track created by the studio.

== Episode guide ==
No. overall	No. in season	Title	Original release date
1	1	"**High Rise Hair Raiser** / **Everyone Hyde!**"	September 11, 1976
**Scooby-Doo** in "High Rise Hair Raiser": When Fred, Shaggy, and Scooby get jobs on a construction crew, they discover that the building site is being haunted by the ghost of a man whose house stood on the very spot as the new building. But could this mystery have less to do with sentimental phantoms than with the robberies taking place around town? **Dynomutt, Dog Wonder** in "Everyone Hyde!“: Willie the Weasel has created a formula that turns him into Mr. Hyde. While the Blue Falcon and Dynomutt are on the trail of the mysterious Mr. Hyde, they encounter the Mystery Inc. gang and Scooby-Doo (who are unaware that Mr. Hyde is a supervillain and not one of their typical "spooks"). In The New Scooby-Doo Movies-fashion, they team up with the Blue Falcon and Dynomutt (who happens to be Scooby's hero) to stop Mr. Hyde who has threaten to turn the entire city into Mr. Hydes unless he is proclaimed Mayor. Fred and the others find a clue (which turns out to be Willie the Weasel's glove) and the Blue Falcon deduces that he is Mr. Hyde. The Blue Falcon and Dynomutt have Mr. Hyde proclaimed Mayor and pretend to be turned in so that Mr. Hyde will lead them to his secret lair, where they can trick him into showing them the antidote to the Hyde formula. Willie the Weasel and his canine partner-in-crime "Snitch" manage to escape. The Blue Falcon and Dynomutt head to the Mayor's mansion to stop Hyde from retrieving his stolen loot. The Mystery Inc. gang setup one of their infamous "Scooby Traps", while the Blue Falcon and Dynomutt confront Mr. Hyde and Snitch. Dynomutt captures Snitch, while the Blue Falcon and the Mystery Inc. crew capture Willie the Weasel/Mr. Hyde. Note: this episode is a crossover between Dynomutt, Dog Wonder and Scooby-Doo.
2	2	"**The Fiesta Host is An Aztec Ghost** / **What Now, Lowbrow?**"	September 18, 1976
**Scooby-Doo** in "The Fiesta Host is An Aztec Ghost": The gang is in Cinqo, Mexico to attend a fiesta that gets cancelled because of the ghost of Katazuma, an ancient Aztec king, and his living Aztec Statue henchman. **Dynomutt, Dog Wonder** in "What Now, Lowbrow?“: A caveman-like criminal named Lowbrow wants to become the King of Crime and steals some books that will help him in his quest. The Blue Falcon and Dynomutt end up assisted by Mystery Inc. into stopping Lowbrow. Note: this episode is another crossover between Dynomutt, Dog Wonder and Scooby-Doo.
3	3	"**The Gruesome Game of the Gator Ghoul** / **The Great Brain… Train Robbery** ^{1}"	September 25, 1976
**Scooby-Doo** in "The Gruesome Game of the Gator Ghoul": On their way to see Ma and Pa Skillet and Scooby-Dum, the gang finds the Gator Ghoul, who is scaring people away from the swamp. **Dynomutt, Dog Wonder** in "The Great Brain… Train Robbery“: The Gimmick is a criminal mastermind who uses his prowess of gadgets to create havoc in the city and dares the police to stop him from stealing a train car with a prince inside. Note: Mumbly makes a cameo at the end of the episode.
4	4	"**Watt a Shocking Ghost** / **The Day and Night Robber**"	October 2, 1976
**Scooby-Doo** in "Watt a Shocking Ghost": An empty gas tank forces the gang to stop for the night in Winterhaven. However, the town's spookiest resident—the 10,000-Volt Ghost—plans to ensure that no one stays long. Is the Ghost the spirit of a vengeful electrical worker, or are there more mundane monsters at work? **Dynomutt, Dog Wonder** in "The Day and Night Robber“: A talking worm called the Worm with the mind of a genius and his henchman, Grub, use a digging machine called the Wormborer to spring Bugsy Busby and Roto Chopper from prison in a plot to steal a super-computer.
5	5	"**The Headless Horseman of Halloween** / **The Harbor Robber**"	October 9, 1976
**Scooby-Doo** in "The Headless Horseman of Halloween": On Halloween, the gang takes Scooby-Dum with them to a Halloween party. When the electricity goes out, one of the guests goes missing, and the gang must chase down the legendary Headless Horseman to solve the mystery. **Dynomutt, Dog Wonder** in "The Harbor Robber“: An ocean-themed villain named Fishface plans to steal Big City's oil and hold it for ransom.
6	6	"**Scared a Lot in Camelot** / **Sinister Symphony**"	October 16, 1976
**Scooby-Doo** in "Scared a Lot in Camelot": A visit to Shaggy's uncle is disrupted when he disappears before the gang's arrival. They then discover the hostile ghosts of Merlin the wizard and his Black Knight. **Dynomutt, Dog Wonder** in "Sinister Symphony“: Manyfaces uses his talent for disguises to trick Dynomutt into arresting the Blue Falcon, Mayor Gaunt, and the chief of police.
7	7	"**The Harum Scarum Sanitarium** / **Don't Bug Superthug**"	October 23, 1976
**Scooby-Doo** in "The Harum Scarum Sanitarium": While on a trip to Niagara Falls, the gang ends up staying at an asylum being haunted by the ghost of Dr. Coffin. His two henchmen seem to be driving an ambulance taking patients, but are they really patients, or is the spooky sanitarium hiding something? **Dynomutt, Dog Wonder** in "Don't Bug Superthug“: Superthug and his henchman Zorkon have created a super-dynamic steel skeleton and plan to use it to steal Big City's steel supply in order to mass-produce an army of steel skeletons.
8	8	"**The No-Face Zombie Chase Case** / **Factory Recall**"	October 30, 1976
**Scooby-Doo** in "The No-Face Zombie Chase Case": While eating dinner, Scooby witnesses a burglary—a faceless zombie stealing a rare coin. As they follow the zombie to the Dilly Dally Dolly toy factory, they end up being chased all over the building by the zombie and by a gorilla. **Dynomutt, Dog Wonder** in "'Factory Recall“: The Blue Falcon loses his Falcon Communicator while he and Dynomutt are fighting Mr. Cool. Mr. Cool then makes the Blue Falcon think that he is F.O.C.U.S. One, claiming that Dynomutt needs to be recalled to where he was made. With Dynomutt reprogrammed and under his control, Mr. Cool has Dynomutt dispose of the Blue Falcon, while he initiates a plot to freeze Big City.
9	9	"**Mamba Wamba and the Voodoo Hoodoo** / **The Queen Hornet**"	November 6, 1976
**Scooby-Doo** in "Mamba Wamba and the Voodoo Hoodoo": The gang goes to see their friend Alex's band perform. However, matters get spooky when the band plays a song based on an ancient voodoo chant, summoning the ghost of a witch doctor who kidnaps one of the band members. The mystery leads the gang to an old Southern mansion, where they plunge into a plot involving legal papers more than the living dead. **Dynomutt, Dog Wonder** in "The Queen Hornet“: The Blue Falcon and Dynomutt attempt to get evidence that will put the Queen Hornet in prison.
10	10	"**A Frightened Hound Meets Demon Underground** / **The Wizard of Ooze**"	November 13, 1976
**Scooby-Doo** in "A Frightened Hound Meets Demon Underground": While in Seattle, the gang finds out about a construction site that is being terrorized by demons who live in an underground ancient city. So the gang has an underground mystery to solve. **Dynomutt, Dog Wonder** in "The Wizard of Ooze“: The Swamp Rat and his henchman, Mudmouth, plan to flood Big City by using stolen pumps to send half the water in Bogmeyer Swamp into Big City to start a crime spree. The Blue Falcon and Dynomutt team up once again with Scooby-Doo and Mystery Inc. to stop the villains before Big City becomes Bog City. Note: this episode is another crossover between Dynomutt, Dog Wonder and Scooby-Doo.
11	11	"**A Bum Steer for Scooby** / **Tin Kong**"	November 20, 1976
**Scooby-Doo** in "A Bum Steer for Scooby": While in Texas to go visit Daphne's uncle Matt, the gang encounters a flying bull known as Tamooka, which seems to be the cause of cattle disappearing from the ranch. They then encounter a ghostly medicine man in a Native Indian village. **Dynomutt, Dog Wonder** in "Tin King“: A hack film director named Eric von Flick plans to make a movie called The Total Destruction of Big City, starring his robotic creation, Tin Kong.
12	12	"**There's a Demon Shark in the Foggy Dark** / **The Awful Ordeal With the Head of Steel** ^{3}"	November 25, 1976
**Scooby-Doo** in "There's a Demon Shark in the Foggy Dark": The Maharaja's jewels are stolen in the airport—but the only other creature in the room was a demon shark, frozen in a block of ice. The mystery leads the gang to Sea World, where the creature has come to life. **Dynomutt, Dog Wonder** in "The Awful Ordeal With the Head of Steel“: A mysterious criminal named Ironface seeks revenge on Big City by capturing the district attorney, the warden of Rockatraz, DetectiveMalloy, Mayor Gaunt, Judge Grater, Chief of Police Grisby, and the chief prosecutor, as well as the Blue Falcon and Dynomutt. Now, the Blue Falcon and Dynomutt must defeat Ironface and find out his true identity.
13	13	"**Scooby-Doo, Where's the Crew?** / **The Blue Falcon vs. The Red Vulture**"	November 27, 1976
**Scooby-Doo** in "Scooby-Doo, Where's the Crew?": While helping a professor research a sunken ship, the gang runs into the ghost of the shipwreck's old captain and his motley crew of sea monsters. This monstrous motley crew does not want visitors. But is the reason deeper than it first appears? **Dynomutt, Dog Wonder** in "The Blue Falcon vs. The Red Vulture“: The Red Vulture steals two of the world's most powerful super-jet engines, with plans to use them for his nefarious Vulturejet and, in turn, dominate the airways.
14	14	"**The Ghost That Sacked the Quarterback** / **The Injustice League of America** / What a Knight for a Knight (rerun)"	December 4, 1976
**Scooby-Doo** in "The Ghost That Sacked the Quarterback": While the gang are watching the Hawks play, the star quarterback disappears, and the ghost of a vengeful football player appears and starts to haunt the stadium. **Dynomutt, Dog Wonder** in "The Injustice League of America“: Fishface, the Gimmick, Lowbrow, the Queen Hornet, Superthug, and the Worm have escaped from Big City Prison and formed the Injustice League of America. They plan to commit a major crime spree and dispose of the Blue Falcon and Dynomutt. Note: the titular villain group has no connection to the DC Comics villain group of the same name. Scooby-Doo, Where Are You! in "What a Knight for a Knight": (rerun)
15	15	"**The Ghost of Bad Humor Man** / **Lighter Than Air Raid** / Hassle in the Castle (rerun)"	December 4, 1976
**Scooby-Doo** in "The Ghost of Bad Humor Man": When the Mystery Machine crashes in front of an ice cream factory, the gang discover three phantoms haunting the building. **Dynomutt, Dog Wonder** in "Lighter Than Air Raid": An evil genius of the airways named the Blimp is stealing Big City's supply of helium. Scooby-Doo, Where Are You! in "Hassle in the Castle": (rerun)
16	16	"**The Spirits of ‘76** / **The Prophet Profits** / A Clue for Scooby-Doo (rerun)"	December 4, 1976
**Scooby-Doo** in "The Ghost of Bad Humor Man": While in Washington, D.C., the gang visit the Splitsonian institute (a parody of the Smithsonian Institution). They lose Scooby and get locked in after hours. They find strange things going on like a train moving on its own, and the ghosts of Benedict Arnold, William Demont and John Andre haunting the building. **Dynomutt, Dog Wonder** in "Lighter Than Air Raid“: The Prophet sets up his own disasters, which he can predict for Mayor Gaunt and then charge him $500,000 for every prediction he wants to know. Scooby-Doo, Where Are You! in "A Clue for Scooby-Doo": (rerun)

=== Notes ===
1. **Bold** = indicates new episodes
2. The first segment was billed as Scooby-Doo and all the episodes produced from 1976 to 1979 were repackaged and rerun under The Scooby-Doo Show in 1980
3. The rerun episodes were never officially listed during the original series run. The episodes shown reflect an AI generated list of how the episodes may had been potentially broadcast based on popularity, airdate and time of year.

== Home media ==
The entire series was released on DVD as The Scooby-Doo/Dynomutt Hour: The Complete Series on Tuesday, March 7, 2006, by Warner Home Video (via Hanna-Barbera and Warner Bros. Family Entertainment). However, the episodes contained therein are not the original 1976 broadcast versions (which would have included only one opening and closing credits sequence per episode), but the separate syndicated versions of The Scooby-Doo Show and Dynomutt, Dog Wonder. Some of the original Scooby-Doo/Dynomutt Hour bridging sequences from 1976 (the opening to the Dynomutt segment and the original end credits, both featuring Scooby-Doo) were used periodically when Dynomutt, Dog Wonder aired as part of the USA Cartoon Express from spring 1984 to summer 1992 (the 1978 syndicated titles were shown as well).

== See also ==
- List of Scooby-Doo media
