= Laff-A-Lympics =

American animated television series

- Also known as: Scooby's All-Star Laff-A Lympics; Scooby's All-Stars
- Genre: Comedy, sports
- Created by: Joe Ruby; Ken Spears
- Written by: Neal Barbera; Haskell Barkin
- Directed by: Charles August Nichols; Ray Patterson (1978); Carl Urbano (1978)
- Presented by: Snagglepuss; Mildew Wolf
- Voices of: Julie Bennett; Joe Besser; Mel Blanc; Daws Butler; Henry Corden; Scatman Crothers; Bob Holt; Casey Kasem; Don Messick; Alan Oppenheimer; Gary Owens; Laurel Page; Alan Reed; Marilyn Schreffler; John Stephenson; Vernee Watson; Frank Welker
- Theme music composer: Hoyt Curtin
- Opening theme: "Laff-A-Lympics" (Main Title) by Hoyt Curtin
- Composer: Hoyt Curtin
- Country of origin: United States
- Original language: English
- No. of seasons: 2
- No. of episodes: 24

Production
- Executive producers: William Hanna; Joseph Barbera
- Producers: Don Jurwich (1978); Alex Lovy (1978); Art Scott (1978)
- Editors: Larry C. Cowan; Dick Elliot; Gil Iverson
- Camera setup: George Epperson; Jerry Smith; Reba Bement; Tom Epperson; Chuck Flekal; Curt Hall; Ron Jackson; Larry Smith; Terry Smith; Brandy Whittington; Jerry Whittington
- Running time: 30 minutes
- Production company: Hanna-Barbera Productions

Original release
- Network: ABC
- Release: September 10, 1977 – October 28, 1978

Laff-A-Lympics is an American animated comedy television series produced by Hanna-Barbera Productions. The series premiered as part of the Saturday-morning cartoon program block Scooby's All-Star Laff-A-Lympics, which consists of 24 episodes, on ABC on September 10, 1977. The show is a spoof of the Olympics and the ABC primetime series Battle of the Network Stars, which debuted one year earlier. It featured 45 Hanna-Barbera characters organized into teams (the Scooby Doobies, the Yogi Yahooeys, and the Really Rottens) which competed each week for gold, silver, and bronze medals. In each episode, the Really Rottens would try in each event to cheat only to get caught by Snagglepuss each time. One season of 16 episodes was produced in 1977–78, and for the 1978–79 season, eight new episodes were added to reruns and aired under the title Scooby's All-Stars. Unlike most cartoon series produced by Hanna-Barbera in the 1970s, Laff-A-Lympics did not contain a laugh track. Scooby’s Laff-a-Lympics was originally owned by Taft Broadcasting; Warner Bros. Domestic Television Distribution currently owns the series through its two in-name-only units, Warner Bros. Family Entertainment and Turner Entertainment.

The "all-star" cast was mostly made up of characters from other Hanna-Barbera series. The "Scooby Doobies" included characters from Scooby-Doo, Where Are You!, Captain Caveman and the Teen Angels, Speed Buggy and Dynomutt, Dog Wonder; the "Yogi Yahooeys" had characters from The Yogi Bear Show, The Huckleberry Hound Show and The Quick Draw McGraw Show. The only original characters were some members of the Really Rottens.

In 1978, Hanna-Barbera produced another "all-star" show with a similar theme, titled Yogi's Space Race.

== Format ==
The Laff-A-Lympics cast

The sporting competitions in which the characters are called upon to compete are often comical or offbeat versions of Olympic sports, races, or scavenger hunts. Each segment is set in a different location around the world. In contrast to other Hanna-Barbera sports themed shows, the settings for "Laff-A-Lympics" were real places (with the exception of Atlantis).

Episodes are presented in a format similar to an Olympic television broadcast, with an unseen announcer. Hosting duties and commentary are provided by Snagglepuss and Mildew Wolf (from It's the Wolf! segments of Cattanooga Cats voiced by John Stephenson impersonating Paul Lynde). Snagglepuss and Mildew wear animated versions of the contemporary yellow jackets of ABC Sports announcers. Other Hanna-Barbera characters such as Fred Flintstone, Barney Rubble, Jabberjaw and Peter Potamus made appearances as guest announcers and judges. Other non-competing characters include parents of contestants (interviewed by Mildew before the events) and various monsters and creatures that serve as antagonists during the events.

The "good guy" teams, consisting of the Yogi Yahooeys and the Scooby Doobies, are cooperative and loyal. The Really Rottens, however, always cheat. Typically, the Really Rottens would be poised to win before making a fatal error at the last moment, allowing one of the other two teams to end up on top. Occasionally, though, the Rottens' cheating was not actually against the rules, resulting in their winning (overall, the Scooby team dominated, winning 14 times, against seven victories for the Yahooies, two for the Rottens, and a three-way-tie in the final episode).

Only one complete season of Laff-A-Lympics episodes was produced, with eight new episodes combined with reruns for the second season of Scooby's All Star Laff-A-Lympics (billed as Scooby's All-Stars). When it premiered in the fall of 1977,Scooby's All Star Laff-A-Lympics consisted of several segments, including Captain Caveman and the Teen Angels (which led the two-hour program and later was spun off into its own half-hour show), The Scooby-Doo Show and Dynomutt, Dog Wonder (both of which featured a small number of newly produced segments alongside repeated segments from earlier seasons), and the Laff-A-Lympics segments themselves. The show resurfaced in 1980 as a half-hour series on its own (without the Captain Caveman, Scooby-Doo and Dynomutt cartoons) simply titled Laff-A-Lympics and was later rerun on ABC in 1986. In later years, it has been frequently rerun on USA Cartoon Express, Cartoon Network and Boomerang, often during the time periods when the Summer and Winter Olympics were held (until 2014). It most recently aired on Boomerang in September 2023, and later on MeTV Toons in 2025.

== Teams ==
=== The Scooby Doobies ===
Early model sheet showing Jeannie from the Jeannie series and Melody, Alexander, Alexandra, and Sebastian the Cat from the Josie and the Pussycats series as members of the "Scooby Doobies" team.

This team drew mainly from the 1970s Hanna-Barbera cartoons, particularly the "mystery-solving" series derived from Scooby-Doo, whose titular character served as team captain.

The early production art for the series showed Jeannie from the animated series of the same name, as well as Melody, Alexander, Alexandra and Sebastian the Cat, all from Josie and the Pussycats, as members of the Scooby Doobies. However, legal problems with Columbia Pictures Television, Screen Gems' successor, as well as Archie Comics, prevented them from appearing in the series. Although Hanna-Barbera happened to have the ownership of Jeannie character Babu, Columbia had all rights to Jeannie's image, including her cartoon form at the time. Similarly, Archie Comics held the rights to the Josie characters.

As a result of all these issues, in the actual series, Babu appeared all by himself as a member of the Scooby Doobies, while Jeannie was replaced by Hong Kong Phooey and the Josie characters were replaced by characters from Captain Caveman and the Teen Angels.

Among the members of the Scooby Doobies are:

Name	Note
Scooby-Doo	Team captain; Character from Scooby-Doo, Where Are You!, The New Scooby-Doo Movies and The Scooby-Doo Show
Shaggy Rogers	Character from Scooby-Doo, Where Are You!, The New Scooby-Doo Movies and The Scooby-Doo Show
Scooby-Dum	Character from The Scooby-Doo Show
Dynomutt	Character from Dynomutt, Dog Wonder
The Blue Falcon	Character from Dynomutt, Dog Wonder
Captain Caveman	Character from Captain Caveman and the Teen Angels
Brenda Chance	Character from Captain Caveman and the Teen Angels
Taffy Dare	Character from Captain Caveman and the Teen Angels
Dee Dee Skyes	Character from Captain Caveman and the Teen Angels
Speed Buggy	Character from Speed Buggy
Tinker	Character from Speed Buggy
Babu	Character from Jeannie
Hong Kong Phooey	Character from Hong Kong Phooey

=== The Yogi Yahooeys ===
This team drew mainly from the 1950s and 1960s Hanna-Barbera cartoons and was the only team of characters made up completely of anthropomorphic animals. Grape Ape was the only post-1962 character in the line-up.

Among the members of the Yogi Yahooeys are:

Name	Note
Yogi Bear	Team captain; Character from The Huckleberry Hound Show and The Yogi Bear Show
Boo-Boo Bear	Character from The Huckleberry Hound Show and The Yogi Bear Show
Cindy Bear	Character from The Yogi Bear Show
Yakky Doodle	Character from The Yogi Bear Show
Huckleberry Hound	Character from The Huckleberry Hound Show
Pixie	Character from The Huckleberry Hound Show
Dixie	Character from The Huckleberry Hound Show
Mr. Jinks	Character from The Huckleberry Hound Show
Hokey Wolf	Character from The Huckleberry Hound Show
Quick Draw McGraw	Character from The Quick Draw McGraw Show
Snooper	Character from The Quick Draw McGraw Show
Blabber	Character from The Quick Draw McGraw Show
Augie Doggie	Character from The Quick Draw McGraw Show
Doggie Daddy	Character from The Quick Draw McGraw Show
Wally Gator	Character from The Hanna-Barbera New Cartoon Series
Grape Ape	Character from The Great Grape Ape Show

=== The Really Rottens ===
This team was composed of villainous characters that frequently cheated by either giving themselves an unfair advantage in a contest or sabotaging the other teams, often getting themselves penalized for such conducts. With the exception of Mumbly and the Dalton Brothers, all of the team members were original characters.

Originally, Muttley and Dick Dastardly were planned as the leaders of the Really Rottens; however, they could not appear as those characters were co-owned by Heatter-Quigley Productions. In their place, Hanna-Barbera used the existing character Mumbly and created the new character Dread Baron. Prior to Laff-A-Lympics, on his original show, Mumbly was a heroic detective rather than a villain. Following the character's revision as the villainous team leader, he remained a villain in Yogi Bear and the Magical Flight of the Spruce Goose, which was also Dread Baron's only appearance outside of Laff-A-Lympics.

The Dalton Brothers appeared in 1950s and 1960s shorts (including the 1958 short Sheriff Huckleberry Hound, which featured appearances by Dinky, Dirty, and Dastardly Dalton, as well as their other brothers Dangerous, Detestable, Desperate, and Despicable). However, they were given new character designs for the Laff-A-Lympics series. After Laff-A-Lympics, Dinky reappeared in The Good, the Bad, and Huckleberry Hound with brothers Stinky (who bore a resemblance to the Laff-A-Lympics design of Dastardly Dalton), Finky, and Pinky.

Among the members of the Really Rottens are:

Name	Note
Mumbly	Team captain; Character from The Mumbly Cartoon Show; Bears a strong resemblance to the Wacky Races character Muttley; Mumbly's retcon from good detective (as depicted in his preceding cartoon show) to villain was never addressed in Laff-a-Lympics
Dread Baron	Original character; Bears a strong resemblance to Dick Dastardly (who is revealed to be his twin brother in the comic book Laff-A-Lympics #13) and the Red Max, both from Wacky Races
Dinky Dalton	Character from The Quick Draw McGraw Show and The Huckleberry Hound Show; Towering villainous cowboy brother whose Stetson obscures his eyes
Dirty Dalton	Character from The Quick Draw McGraw Show and The Huckleberry Hound Show; Short villainous cowboy brother with mustache
Dastardly Dalton	Character from The Quick Draw McGraw Show and The Huckleberry Hound Show; Short villainous cowboy brother with blond hair
Mr. Creepley	Original character; Patriarch of villainous monster family based on The Gruesomes and Mr. & Mrs. J. Evil Scientist; His voice resembles that of Peter Lorre
Mrs. Creepley	Original character; Matriarch of villainous monster family based on The Gruesomes and Mr. & Mrs. J. Evil Scientist
Junior Creepley	Original character; Child of villainous monster family based on The Gruesomes and Mr. & Mrs. J. Evil Scientist
Orful Octopus	Original character; Pet of the Creepleys; Villainous hybrid version of Squiddly Diddly and Occy the Octopus (pet of The Gruesomes)
The Great Fondoo	Original character; Evil magician whose tricks and spells hardly ever work as intended, often backfiring on his part; Bears a resemblance to Abner K. Dabra from the 1963 book Yogi Bear and the Cranky Magician
Magic Rabbit	Original character; Pet rabbit of the Great Fondoo whose only speaking line is "Brak"; Bears a resemblance to the White Rabbit from Alice in Wonderland or What's a Nice Kid like You Doing in a Place like This?
Daisy Mayhem	Original character; Mean-spirited hillbilly with split ends in her hair; Though her name is similar to Li'l Abner character "Daisy Mae", she bears a much stronger resemblance to a lesser-known supporting character from that same comic strip: Moonbeam McSwine
Sooey	Original character; Daisy Mayhem's eyepatch-wearing pet pig

== Cast ==
- Daws Butler as Yogi Bear, Augie Doggie, Huckleberry Hound, Quick Draw McGraw, Wally Gator, Snagglepuss, Mr. Jinks, Dixie, Hokey Wolf, Super Snooper, Blabber Mouse, Scooby-Dum, Dastardly Dalton
- Don Messick as Boo-Boo Bear, Pixie, Ranger Smith, Scooby-Doo, Mumbly, Dirty Dalton, Mr. Creepley, Junior Creepley, Announcer
- Julie Bennett as Cindy Bear
- John Stephenson as Doggie Daddy, Mildew Wolf, Dread Baron, The Great Fondoo
- Frank Welker as Jabberjaw, Yakky Doodle, Tinker, Dynomutt, Magic Rabbit, Sooey
- Mel Blanc as Captain Caveman, Speed Buggy, Barney Rubble
- Bob Holt as Grape Ape, Dinky Dalton, Orful Octopus
- Vernee Watson-Johnson as Dee Dee Skyes
- Marilyn Schreffler as Brenda Chance, Daisy Mayhem
- Laurel Page as Taffy Dare, Mrs. Creepley
- Scatman Crothers as Hong Kong Phooey
- Gary Owens as Blue Falcon
- Alan Reed as Fred Flintstone (earlier episodes)
- Henry Corden as Fred Flintstone (later episodes)
- Casey Kasem as Shaggy Rogers
- Joe Besser as Babu

== Episodes ==
=== Season 1 – Scooby's All-Star Laff-A-Lympics (1977) ===
No. overall	No. in season	Title/Location	Guest star(s)	Winner	Original release date	Prod. code
1	1	"The Swiss Alps and Tokyo"	Fred Flintstone, Barney Rubble & Mrs. Mumbly (Mumbly's mom)	The Scooby Doobies (105 points)	September 10, 1977	SDLA-1
Events: downhill ski race, ice skating, toboggan race, sumo wrestling, one-point tennis match, baseball batting contest
2	2	"Acapulco and England"	Jabberjaw	The Scooby Doobies (70 points)	September 17, 1977	SDLA-2
Events: cliff diving, underwater relay, speed boat race, Big Ben tower climb, fox hunt, skateboard polo
3	3	"Florida and China"	None	The Scooby Doobies (115 points)	September 24, 1977	SDLA-3
Events: swamp buggy race, waterski contest, auto track race, rickshaw race, ping pong, gymnastics
4	4	"The Sahara Desert and Scotland"	None	The Yogi Yahooeys (70 points)	October 1, 1977	SDLA-4
Events: dune buggy race, fill-up-the-oasis contest, Loch Ness photograph contest, three-legged kilt race
5	5	"France and Australia"	None	The Scooby Doobies (120 points)	October 8, 1977	SDLA-5
Events: Tour de France bicycle race, Eiffel Tower climb, boomerang throw, kangaroo race
6	6	"Athens and the Ozarks"	None	The Scooby Doobies (105 points)	October 15, 1977	SDLA-6
Events: pole vault, disco throw (discus), rail cart race, keelboat race
7	7	"Italy and Kitty Hawk, North Carolina"	None	The Scooby Doobies (85 points)	October 22, 1977	SDLA-7
Events: motor scooter race, canal boat race, hang gliding contest, skydiving contest, hot air balloon race
8	8	"Egypt and Sherwood Forest"	None	The Scooby Doobies (90 points)	October 29, 1977	SDLA-8
Events: Great Pyramid climb, camel race, armor foot race, princess rescue
9	9	"Spain and the Himalayas"	None	The Scooby Doobies (90 points)	November 5, 1977	SDLA-9
Events: bullfight, gypsy wagon race, abominable snowman hunt, Mount Everest climb
10	10	"India and Israel"	Jabberjaw, Peter Potamus, Fred Flintstone & Barney Rubble	The Yogi Yahooeys (100 points)	November 12, 1977	SDLA-10
Events: tiger hunt, elephant back race, sun sail sledding race, reed boat race
11	11	"Africa and San Francisco"	Jabberjaw	The Yogi Yahooeys (80 points)	November 19, 1977	SDLA-11
Events: jungle boat race, vine-swinging contest, roller-skating race, fishing contest
12	12	"The Grand Canyon and Ireland"	None	The Yogi Yahooeys (135 points)	November 26, 1977	SDLA-12
Events: burro race, tightrope race, leprechaun hunt, hole-in-one golf tournament
13	13	"Hawaii and Norway"	None	The Scooby Doobies (90 points)	December 3, 1977	SDLA-13
Events: surfing contest, outrigger race, Viking longboat races, long-jump wearing snowshoes
14	14	"North Pole and Tahiti"	Fred Flintstone & Barney Rubble	The Scooby Doobies (120 points)	December 10, 1977	SDLA-14
Events: dog-sled races, igloo-building contest, around-the-reef paddleboat race, sandcastle-building contest
15	15	"Arizona and Holland"	Mr. and Mrs. Mayhem (Daisy Mayhem's parents)	The Scooby Doobies (75 points)	December 17, 1977	SDLA-15
Events: wild bronc riding contest, steer roping, windmill-riding contest, dyke-building contest
16	16	"Quebec and Baghdad"	Fred Flintstone, Barney Rubble & Ranger Smith	The Scooby Doobies (65 points)	December 24, 1977	SDLA-16
Events: lacrosse batting contest, Canadian tree-cutting contest, flying carpet race, magic rope climb

=== Season 2 – Scooby's All-Stars (1978) ===
No. overall	No. in season	Title/Location	Guest star(s)	Winner	Original release date
17	1	"Russia and the Caribbean"	None	The Scooby Doobies (100 points)	September 9, 1978
Events: Siberian moose marathon, dancing race through Moscow, dolphin race, Bluebeard's treasure hunt
18	2	"New York and Turkey"	Jabberjaw	The Really Rottens (75 points)	September 16, 1978
Events: hansom carriage race, Statue of Liberty climb, unicycle race, swimming relay
19	3	"South America and Transylvania"	None	The Yogi Yahooeys (90 points)	September 23, 1978
Events: bull lasso contest, Amazon raft race, spooky scavenger hunt, Black Lagoon log-roll race
20	4	"French Riviera and New Zealand"	Fred Flintstone	The Scooby Doobies (90 points)	September 30, 1978
Events: soapbox derby, free-flight kite contest, emu race, 3-way tug-of-war
21	5	"New Orleans and Atlantis"	Jabberjaw	The Yogi Yahooeys (70 points)	October 7, 1978
Events: antique aircraft distance contest, Chinese dragon race, sea horse race, mermaid rescue
22	6	"Morocco and Washington, D.C."	Mr. and Mrs. Octopus (Orful Octopus' parents)	The Really Rottens (75 points)	October 14, 1978
Events: roller-scooter race, sand chariot race, rally race, marine corps obstacle course
23	7	"Canada and Warsaw"	None	The Yogi Yahooeys (85 points)	October 21, 1978
Events: get-your-man contest, dog-sled race, freestyle pole-vault contest, pogo-stick race
24	8	"Siam and the Moon"	None	All three teams tie (80 points)	October 28, 1978
Events: Siamese sampan race, 3-way soccer match, rocket race, lunar foot race

== Home release ==
=== VHS ===
In 1996, four VHS editions of the show were released in the US on the NTSC format, each containing two episodes for a running time of approximately 50 minutes:

- Heavens to Hilarity, This Is It, Sports Fans!
- Yippee for the Yogi Yahooeys!
- On Your Marks, Get Set — Go Scoobys!
- Something Smells Really Rotten

At the same time a "bumper special" VHS tape was released in the UK on the PAL format containing the following episodes (these UK episodes were the US episodes divided in two, with just one location per episode):

- "Grand Canyon"
- "Ireland"
- "Israel"
- "Swiss Alps"
- "Tokyo"
- "Acapulco"
- "Baghdad"
- "Florida"
- "China"
- "Italy"
- "Kitty Hawk"

=== Home Media ===
Warner Home Video (via Hanna-Barbera and Warner Bros. Family Entertainment) released episodes 1–4 on Region 1 DVD on January 19, 2010, as Scooby's All-Star Laff-A-Lympics Volume 1. Episodes 5–8 were on a second DVD titled Scooby's All-Star Laff-A-Lympics Volume 2, released the same day by Target and by other stores on October 19, 2010. A two-disc DVD set entitled Scooby-Doo! Laff-A-Lympics: Spooky Games was released on July 17, 2012. The set contains an all-new Scooby Doo special, "Spooky Games", plus 12 episodes of Laff-a-Lympics – including episodes 9–16, which complete the first season, plus four earlier first-season episodes which appear on Volume 1 and 2. The set also includes an UltraViolet digital copy of the 12 contained episodes. Later in the year, the Warner Brothers shop renamed this release Laff-a-Lympics: The Complete First Collection. Region 4 received Volume 1 and 2 in July 2010.

On July 4, 2016, Volume 1 and Volume 2 were released separately in Region 2, as was a 'Gold Edition' with the previously released Spooky Games DVD; this Region 2 version of the Scooby-Doo! Laff-A-Lympics: Spooky Games DVD is only a separate version of the first disc from the R1 set, containing "Spooky Games" and four further episodes; therefore, only 12 episodes are currently available in R2, as of July 2016.

On March 31, 2026, Scooby's All Star Laff-A-Lympics: The Complete Collection will be released on Blu-Ray. The set will feature the complete series.

Home media set name	Release date	Episodes included	Notes	No. of discs
Scooby's All-Star Laff-A-Lympics Volume 1 (DVD)	January 19, 2010 (US)	"The Swiss Alps" and "Tokyo, Japan"; "Acapulco" and "England"; "The Sahara Desert" and "Scotland"; "Florida" and "China"	Bonus: "Smart House" from Shaggy and Scooby-Doo Get a Clue!, season 1, episode 5.	1
Scooby's All-Star Laff-A-Lympics Volume 2 (DVD)	January 19, 2010 (US Target stores); October 19, 2010 (wider retail)	"France" and "Australia"; "Athens, Greece" and "the Ozarks"; "Italy" and "Kitty Hawk, North Carolina"; "Egypt" and "Sherwood Forest"	Bonus: "Mystery of the Missing Mystery Solvers" from Shaggy and Scooby-Doo Get a Clue!, season 1, episode 8.	1
Scooby-Doo! Laff-A-Lympics: Spooky Games (DVD)	July 17, 2012	"Spain" and "Himalayas"; "India" and "Israel"; "Africa" and "San Francisco"; "Grand Canyon" and "Ireland"; "Hawaii" and "Norway"; "North Pole" and "Tahiti"; "Arizona" and "Holland"; "Quebec" and "Baghdad"; "Swiss Alps" and "Tokyo, Japan"; "Sahara" and "Scotland"; "France" and "Australia"; "Egypt" and "Sherwood Forest"	A bonus never-before-released episode called "Spooky Games" was included as part of the collaboration.	2
Scooby's All-Star Laff-A-Lympics: The Complete Collection (Blu-Ray)	March 31, 2026	All 24 episodes of the series	Bonus episode: Scooby-Doo! Spooky Games	TBA

== Other media ==
=== Comic books ===
In March 1978, Marvel Comics produced a comic book series based on the cartoon. Creative staff for the comic book included Mark Evanier, Carl Gafford, Scott Shaw!, Jack Manning, Owen Fitzgerald, and others. The series lasted 13 issues. A Laff-A-Lympics comic book was also published in Australia in 1978 by Sydney-based K.G. Murray Publishing Company. From 1980 to 1982, various Laff-A-Lympics stories were reprinted in Laff-A-Lympics Annual hardback books in the United Kingdom by Fleetway.

An updated Laff-A-Lympics called the "Superstar Olympics" appeared in Hanna-Barbera Presents #6 in 1996. The Superstar Olympics featured Atom Ant, Augie Doggie and Doggie Daddy, Barney Rubble, Betty Rubble, Boo-Boo Bear, Chopper, Cindy Bear, Dick Dastardly, Fred Flintstone, Grape Ape, Hokey Wolf, Huckleberry Hound, Jabberjaw, Magilla Gorilla, Muttley, Peter Potamus, Pixie and Dixie and Mr. Jinks, Quick Draw McGraw, Ranger Smith, Secret Squirrel, Snagglepuss, Snooper and Blabber, Squiddly Diddly, Top Cat, Touché Turtle, Wally Gator, Wilma Flintstone, and Yogi Bear.

=== Games ===
A Laff-A-Lympics hand-held pinball game was released in 1978. The game featured Scooby-Doo, Captain Caveman, Dee Dee, Taffy, Blue Falcon, Yogi Bear, Boo-Boo Bear, Huckleberry Hound, Grape Ape, Mumbly, Dread Baron, Mr. Creepley, Dalton Brothers, Snagglepuss, and Mildew Wolf.

A Laff-A-Lympics Presto Magix dry transfer set was released in 1978 by Papermate that featured Scooby-Doo, Shaggy, Captain Caveman, Blue Falcon, Babu, Speed Buggy, Yogi Bear, Wally Gator, Huckleberry Hound, Hokey Wolf, Mr. Jinks, Quick Draw McGraw, Mumbly, Dread Baron, Orful Octopus, Mrs. Creepley, Dastardly Dalton, Snagglepuss and Mildew Wolf.

In 1979, Hanna-Barbera released a Laff-A-Lympics Old Maid card game that included Scooby-Doo, Shaggy, Dynomutt, Blue Falcon, Hong Kong Phooey, Yogi Bear, Boo-Boo Bear, Huckleberry Hound, Grape Ape, Quick Draw McGraw, Pixie and Dixie, Yakky Doodle, Mumbly, Dread Baron, Snagglepuss, and Mildew Wolf.

=== Other appearances ===
Dread Baron and Mumbly appear in Yogi Bear and the Magical Flight of the Spruce Goose. While Don Messick reprised Mumbly, Dread Baron was voiced by Paul Winchell.

Dinky Dalton appears in the Yogi's Treasure Hunt episode "The Return of El Kabong", voiced by Stacy Keach, Sr. He is shown to be with his brothers Desperate Dalton and Despicable Dalton.

Dinky Dalton appears in The Good, the Bad, and Huckleberry Hound, voiced by Allan Melvin. As mentioned above, he has brothers named Finky Dalton (voiced by Pat Fraley), Pinky Dalton (voiced by Charlie Adler), and Stinky Dalton (voiced by Michael Bell). This same Dalton line-up also appeared in an episode of the 2017 version of Wacky Races with Dinky voiced by Christopher Judge, Finky voiced by Tom Kenny, Pinky voiced by Diedrich Bader, and Stinky voiced by Billy West.

The Dread Baron appears in Jellystone!. He was seen in "Jailcation" where he was apprehended by the Jellystone Police Department and became an inmate at Santo Relaxo. The majority of the Really Rottens appeared in the season 3 episode "LAFF Games" with Daisy Mayhem voiced by Georgie Kidder, Dinky Dalton voiced by Dwight Schultz in "LAFF Games" and by Rob Riggle in "El Kabong Along With Me", Orful Octopus voiced by Bernardo de Paula, and Magic Rabbit voiced by Niccole Thurman. In it, the Really Rottens are from New Bedrock and are led by Mayor Dick Dastardly and Muttley instead of the Dread Baron and Mumbly (similar to the original concept).

== Cultural references ==
- Laff-A-Lympics was parodied in the Robot Chicken episode "Ban on the Fun". In a segment that parodies Laff-A-Lympics in the style of the 1972 Munich massacre, the Yogi Yahooeys are taken hostage and murdered by the Really Rottens. In retaliation, the Scooby Doobies alongside Snooper and Blabber arm themselves and kill the Really Rottens. The sketch itself lampoons the theatrical trailer for Steven Spielberg's 2005 film Munich, based on actual events. The sketch featured Blue Falcon, Boo-Boo Bear, Captain Caveman, Daisy Mayhem, Dinky and Dirty Dalton, Doggie Daddy, Dread Baron, Dynomutt, The Great Fondoo, Hong Kong Phooey, Huckleberry Hound, Mumbly, Quick Draw McGraw (as El Kabong), Snagglepuss, Scooby-Doo, Scooby-Dum, Scrappy-Doo (who was never a member of the Scooby Doobies), Shaggy Rogers, Snooper and Blabber, Wally Gator, and Yogi Bear.
- The series was also parodied in the Harvey Birdman, Attorney at Law episode "Grape Juiced" with Grape Ape voiced by John Michael Higgins and Beegle Beagle voiced by Doug Preis. In that episode, Grape Ape is accused of using steroids at the recent Laff-A-Lympics event. Yakky Doodle, Grape Ape's teammate from the Yogi Yahooeys, also makes a cameo appearance as a witness during Grape Ape's trial. The Magic Rabbit makes a cameo in the episode "SPF" as a victim of CyberSquatting.
- The Really Rottens (consisting of Mumbly, Daisy Mayhem, Mr. Creepley, Orful Octopus, and the Dalton Brothers) made a cameo appearance in The Cleveland Show episode "Ship'rect". In the episode, Mumbly is the captain of a boat crewed by the Really Rottens in a Floaterboat Race.
