= Scooby-Doo! Mask of the Blue Falcon =

- iTunes DVD cover
- Directed by: Michael Goguen
- Written by: Marly Halper-Graser; Michael Ryan
- Based on: Scooby-Doo; Dynomutt, Dog Wonder by Joe Ruby and Ken Spears
- Produced by: James Tucker; Alan Burnett; Jason Wyatt; Sam Register
- Starring: Frank Welker; Mindy Cohn; Grey DeLisle; Matthew Lillard
- Music by: Michael McCuistion; Lolita Ritmanis; Kristopher Carter
- Production company: Warner Bros. Animation
- Distributed by: Warner Home Video
- Release date: February 26, 2013
- Running time: 78 minutes
- Country: United States
- Language: English

Scooby-Doo! Mask of the Blue Falcon is a 2013 American animated superhero comedy mystery film and the nineteenth entry in the direct-to-video series of Scooby-Doo films. The film is a crossover that features the Blue Falcon and Dynomutt. It was produced and completed in 2012 and released on February 26, 2013 by Warner Premiere.

== Plot ==
Mystery Inc. travels to San De Pedro, California for the "Mega Mondo Pop! Comic ConApalooza" so Shaggy Rogers and Scooby-Doo can enter a costume contest as their favorite superheroes, the Blue Falcon and Dynomutt. There, they meet Jennifer Severin, a film producer in the midst of making a dark and gritty Blue Falcon film; its leading actor Brad Adams; Hank Prince, the owner of a comic book store that Shaggy frequently visits; his nephew Austin; Owen Garrison, the washed-up star of the original Blue Falcon television series; and Jack Rabble, a former Combat Bots champion. When Shaggy and Scooby try to get Garrison's autograph, he instead rants to them about how Severin's studio intends to remove all traces of his series in preparation for the film. Amidst a screening for its trailer, Mr. Hyde, an antagonist from the Blue Falcon television series, emerges to terrorize the conventioneers.

As Mystery Inc. offers to investigate, most of them consider Garrison to be the culprit, but Shaggy and Scooby refuse to believe them. Using surveillance footage, they discover that Severin stands to gain increased publicity for her film from the incident while Adams dislikes his role in it and is hoping for an opportunity to resign. Realizing Hyde's attacks were based on episodes of the Blue Falcon television series and that his next attack will involve a mutagenic ooze that transfigures living creatures into monsters, Shaggy and Scooby later stumble upon Hyde's lair before he chases them out and attacks San De Pedro with a harmless placebo of the ooze. Having been humiliated during the attack, city mayor Ron Starlin furiously closes the investigation, relinquishes Mystery Inc.'s services and revokes their access to the convention.

Upon learning the Blue Falcon film premiere is being held at the local ballpark and deducing it will be Hyde's next target, Fred, Velma and Daphne enlist Austin and Rabble's help in sneaking past the convention's security so they can infiltrate Hyde's lair. There, they learn that the villain has been spying on the convention and ballpark before witnessing a giant Hyde rampaging in the latter.

Meanwhile, Shaggy and Scooby find themselves trapped in there while searching for something to eat. Seeing Austin in danger, the duo rescue him before their friends arrive to defeat the giant Hyde and discover that it was actually a mech seemingly piloted by Garrison. Despite his claims about someone knocking him out to frame him for the attack, Garrison is nearly arrested. However, Shaggy and Scooby witness the actual Hyde having carjacked an armored car; the latter manages to foil the robbery, only for Hyde to gain the upper hand. Nonetheless, Garrison, taking on his former Blue Falcon role, joins Scooby in defeating the villain.

Hyde is then revealed to be Rabble, who has been plotting to take revenge on the convention after he was ousted from Combat Bots due to weaponizing one of his robots with live missiles, forcing him to make money off of his appearances there ever since. After forcing the premiere to be held at the ballpark and planting Garrison in the actually-independent mech, he would use the attack to divert the armored car into a detour to carjack it and make off with the five million dollars' worth of the convention's entrance fees it had. As Rabble is apprehended for his crimes, Starlin arrives to congratulate Mystery Inc. for their work and apologize for misjudging them.

Some time later, an impressed Severin produces a sequel to her Blue Falcon film, with Garrison guest-starring as the original Blue Falcon and father of Adams' character and Scooby portraying Dynomutt.

== Voice cast ==
- Frank Welker as Scooby-Doo, Fred Jones and Dynomutt
- Matthew Lillard as Shaggy Rogers
- Mindy Cohn as Velma Dinkley
- Grey DeLisle as Daphne Blake
- Jeff Bennett as Owen Garrison / The Blue Falcon
- Diedrich Bader as Brad Adams
- Dee Bradley Baker as the vocal effects of Mr. Hyde's Hideous Hyde Hound and Horten McGuggenheim alias The Manic Minotaur of Manesley Manor
- Gregg Berger as Hank Prince
- John DiMaggio as Mr. Hyde
- Nika Futterman as Jennifer Severin
- Kevin Michael Richardson as Mayor Ron Starlin
- Mindy Sterling as a caterer
- Tara Strong as Austin Prince and Nora Bingleton
- Fred Tatasciore as Jack Rabble and the interpretation of Dynomutt in Severin's upcoming Blue Falcon film
- Billy West as James Becker
