= Mildew Wolf =

Hanna-Barbera cartoon character

- It's the Wolf! character
- First appearance: It's the Wolf
- Last appearance: Dr. Kabong, Professional Therapist
- Created by: William Hanna Joseph Barbera
- Voiced by: Paul Lynde (1969–1971); John Stephenson (1977-1978); Bernando de Paula (2021-2025)

In-universe information
- Species: Wolf
- Gender: Male
- Occupation: Announcer

Mildew Wolf is a fictional anthropomorphic wolf, main antagonist, and title character of the Cattanooga Cats segment It's the Wolf!. He is the most popular character of the series, and he was voiced by an uncredited Paul Lynde.

== Biography ==
Mildew's main goal in the segments was to catch a little sheep named Lambsy, but he was always thwarted by Lambsy's sheep dog friend and bodyguard, Bristlehound.

== Other appearances ==
- In 1977–78, Mildew became a co-host (with Snagglepuss) on the Laff-A-Lympics segments of Scooby's All-Star Laff-A-Lympics / Scooby's All-Stars. He was voiced by John Stephenson.
- Mildew Wolf appeared in A Yabba-Dabba-Doo Celebration! 50 Years of Hanna-Barbera.
- Mildew Wolf appears in Jellystone!, voiced by Bernardo de Paula. He is depicted as being highly accident-prone, as well as bisexual, momentarily flirting with his co-worker Shazzan while also once trying to get a date with the female Jabberjaw Jr.
