= Pat Stevens =

American actress (1945-2010)

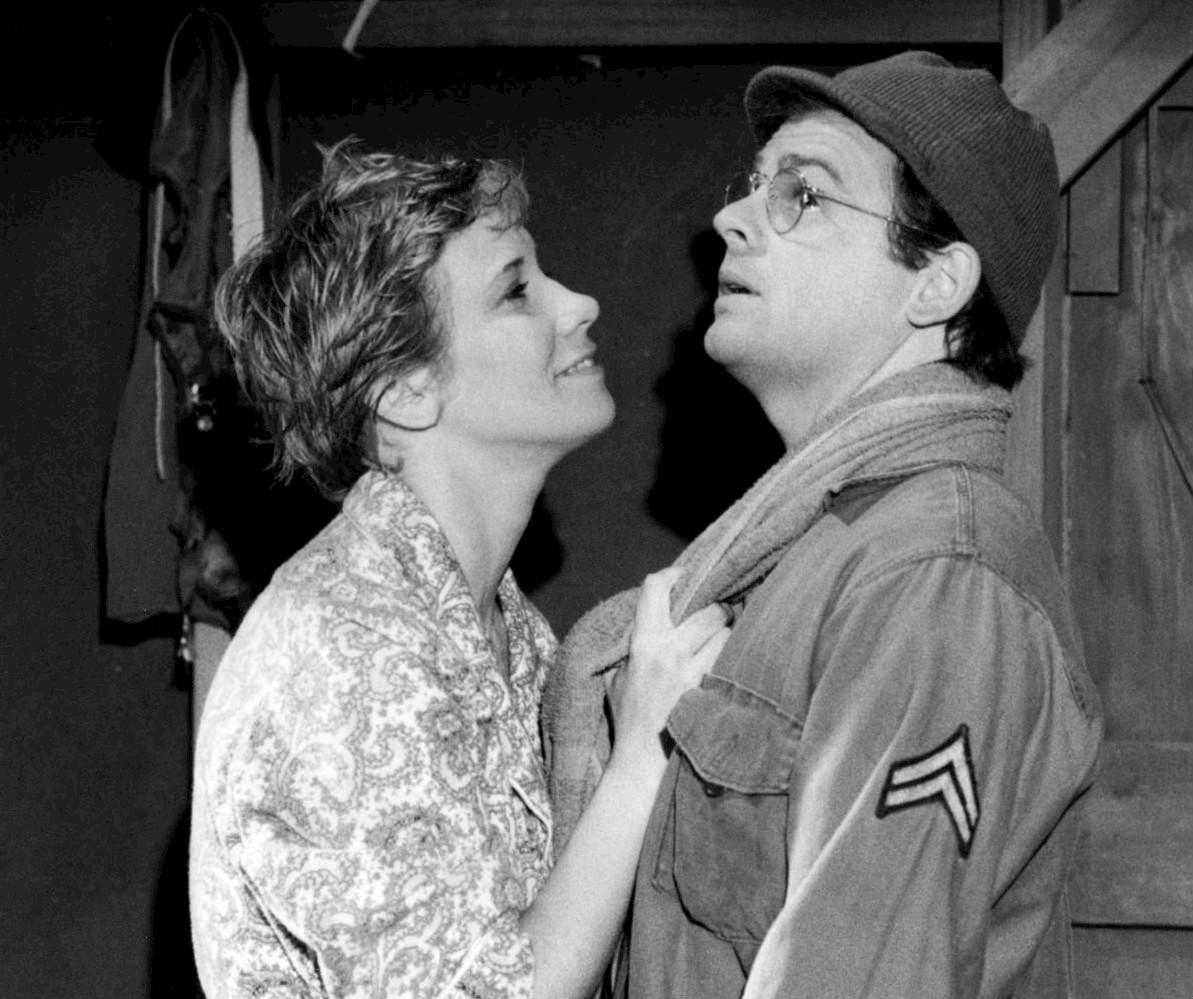
- Pat Stevens with Gary Burghoff in M*A*S*H, 1977
- Born: Patricia Szczepaniak; September 16, 1945; Linden, New Jersey, U.S.
- Died: May 26, 2010 (aged 64); Rutland, Massachusetts, U.S.
- Occupation: Actress
- Years active: 1973–1984
- Spouse: Jess Nadelman (m. 1980)
- Children: 2

Patricia Stevens (née Szczepaniak; September 16, 1945 – May 26, 2010) was an American actress. She is perhaps best known for her various nurse roles, particularly as Nurse Baker on M*A*S*H and her role as the second voice of the character Velma Dinkley on two Saturday morning cartoon series The Scooby-Doo Show and Scooby-Doo and Scrappy-Doo during the same period (1976–1979).

== Career ==
Stevens voiced the character of Velma Dinkley from 1976 to 1979, leaving the show midway through Scooby-Doo and Scrappy-Doo. She appeared on the long-running television series M*A*S*H from 1974 through 1978 as various nurses in 15 non-consecutive episodes. Stevens was first credited as Nurse Mitchell, then Nurse Baker, Nurse Stevens, Nurse Brown and Nurse Able, before appearing again as Nurse Baker in the episode "Margaret's Marriage" in Season Five, and then finally in "Major Ego" during Season Seven, when she was credited as a Duty Nurse.

== Personal life and death ==
Stevens married former 1970s TV character actor Jess Nadelman in 1980; they had two children, Sara and David. According to an obituary published in the Worcester Telegram & Gazette, Stevens later transitioned from acting to teaching, where she worked "with elementary and secondary education teachers, integrating art into the regular curriculum including science and history".

Stevens died from breast cancer on May 26, 2010, at the age of 64 in Rutland, Massachusetts. She was surrounded by her husband, Jess Nadelman, their children, Sara and David, and her six siblings. She was cremated at Miles Funeral Home in Holden, Massachusetts. Her family had a private memorial service for her in that funeral home.

== Filmography ==
Film
Year	Title	Role	Notes
1984	Crimes of Passion	Group Member #5	(final film role)
Television
Year	Title	Role	Notes
1973	The Girl with Something Extra	Saleslady #2 / Marian	2 episodes
1974	Police Woman	The Secretary	Episode: The End Game
1974–1978	M*A*S*H	Nurse Mitchell / Nurse Baker / Nurse Stevens / Nurse Brown /Nurse Able	15 episodes
1975	ABC Afterschool Specials	Tuck's Mother	Episode: "The Skating Rink"
1975	Karen	Wendy	Episode: "Dena Might"
1976–1978	The Scooby-Doo Show	Velma Dinkley	40 episodes: 16 episodes – as part of The Scooby-Doo/Dynomutt Hour (1976); 8 episodes – as part of Scooby's All-Star Laff-A-Lympics (1977); 16 episodes – as part of Scooby's All-Stars (1978)
1976	The Scooby-Doo/Dynomutt Hour	Velma Dinkley	16 episodes (Scooby-Doo), 3 episodes (Dynomutt)
1977	We've Got Each Other	Role Unknown	Episode: "My Brother's Keeper"
1978	Dynomutt, Dog Wonder	Velma Dinkley	3 episodes
1978	The Bob Newhart Show	Wanda Moss	Episode: "Crisis in Education"
1978	ABC Weekend Specials	Mrs. Small	Episode: "The Contest Kid and the Big Prize"
1979	Scooby-Doo and Scrappy-Doo	Velma Dinkley	11 episodes
1979	Scooby Goes Hollywood	Velma Dinkley	Credited as Pat Stevens, TV movie
1980	Captain Caveman and the Teen Angels	Loni	Episode: "Cavey and the Volcanic Villain"

Preceded by Nicole Jaffe	Voice of Velma Dinkley; 1976–1979	Succeeded by Marla Frumkin
