= Scooby Goes Hollywood =

1979 Scooby-Doo TV special

- Cover of the DVD release of "Scooby-Doo Goes Hollywood"
- Based on: Characters by Hanna-Barbera Productions
- Story by: Dick Robbins; Duane Poole
- Directed by: Ray Patterson
- Starring: Don Messick; Casey Kasem; Rip Taylor; Frank Welker; Heather North Kenney; Pat Stevens
- Theme music composer: Hoyt Curtin
- Country of origin: United States
- Original language: English

Production
- Executive producers: William Hanna; Joseph Barbera
- Producer: Don Jurwich
- Cinematography: Allen Childs; Ron Jackson; Candy Edwards; Kieran Mulgrew; George Epperson; Neil Viker; Tom Epperson; Roy Wade; Curt Hall; Jerry Whittington
- Editor: Gil Iverson
- Running time: 49 minutes
- Production company: Hanna-Barbera Productions

Original release
- Network: ABC
- Release: December 23, 1979

Related
- Scooby-Doo Meets the Boo Brothers

Scooby Goes Hollywood (later released on home video as Scooby-Doo Goes Hollywood) is a 1979 animated television special starring the cast of Hanna-Barbera's Saturday-morning cartoon series Scooby-Doo. It was originally broadcast on ABC on December 23, 1979, to celebrate the 10th anniversary of the franchise.

A musical-based parody of both the Scooby-Doo formula and of Hollywood in general, the story line centered on Shaggy convincing Scooby that both of them deserve better than being stars in what he considers a low-class Saturday morning show, and attempts to pitch a number of potential prime-time shows to network executive "C.J." (voiced by Rip Taylor), all of which are parodies of movies and then-popular TV shows which are How The West Was Won, Happy Days, Laverne & Shirley, Superman, The Sound of Music, Saturday Night Fever, Sonny & Cher, The Love Boat, and Charlie's Angels. Caught in the middle of this ordeal are Fred, Daphne, Velma, and Scooby's loyal Saturday morning fan base; all of whom convince Scooby to come back to his Saturday morning television show.

The special was first released on VHS by Worldvision Enterprises in the 1980s, and again later by Warner Home Video in 1997. The special was released on DVD by Warner Bros. on June 4, 2002. The special was included as a bonus feature in the Blu-ray release of Scooby-Doo! and the Reluctant Werewolf in 2024.

== Plot ==
Scooby-Doo and the rest of the Mystery Inc. gang have solved so many mysteries and become so popular that they now have their own television show in Hollywood, California based on their adventures. One day, after Scooby and Shaggy fall into a catapult while running from "The Crabby Creature of Creepy Crag", they start getting tired of doing the same routine and decide to become real movie stars. They show the president of a network, C.J., a pilot film called How Scooby Won the West, where Sheriff Scooby and Deputy Shaggy undergo the ornery Jesse Rotten. C.J. believes the film is a joke, and throws Shaggy and Scooby out, laughing. After the gang finds out Scooby is leaving the show, they are heartbroken and protest while Shaggy tells them how Scooby will become famous. However, they are still unconvinced.

At a roller-skating rink in town, Shaggy films another pilot (Lavonne and Scooby) while Lavonne skates with Scooby, turning out to be a disaster with several accidents such as when they accidentally crash into Shaggy while filming. While witnessing the filming, the rest of the gang believes that Scooby is making a fool out of himself and agree that they need to convince him to return to his old show. Not giving up, Shaggy and Scooby show C.J. another film called Scooby Days where "the Scoob" meets "the Groove", an obvious parody of the Fonz, in Harold's Drive-In. C.J. suggests that Scooby go back to his own show. Scooby refuses, later trying to mingle with celebrities, but it results in failure.

Back in the gang's dressing room, Fred reads the newspaper article featuring Scooby's failures in shock, making all of them miss Scooby and Shaggy terribly and wish for their return to the show. Looking at a theater, Scooby imagines a premiere of his two new movies (Super Scooby and The Sound of Scooby). In Super Scooby, he saves a Lois Lane clone from a rocket heading toward Big City, only to get blown up himself. In The Sound of Scooby, Scooby wears a pink dress, twirls in the mountain, but as he begins to sing, he falls down a cliff into a stream.

Back at the Chinese theater, Shaggy finds out that the studio is holding dog auditions to replace Scooby's role on his show. He and Scooby go down to see the results of the auditions, and have a laugh upon witnessing the terrible performances. Without them knowing, it is actually a trick set up by C.J. and the rest of the gang to get Scooby back on the show once again. C.J. hires a dog with no talent to take Scooby's role, leaving Scooby and Shaggy in shock. Later, Shaggy shows C.J. a new film, Scooby and Cherie where Scooby is a magician and Cherie, his assistant. The next film is The Love Ship where Captain Scooby forgets to untie the rope from the piers, taking all the people on it with the cruise. To confirm his new career, Scooby is featured on The Jackie Carson Show, where he declares that he's leaving his cartoon series permanently in order to pursue his career as a movie star, upsetting his fans. This also proves to be the last straw for Scooby's friends and fans.

The next (and last) pilot film shown is Scooby's Angels. The plot features the Angels look into criminal headquarters, with Scooby landing from jumping out of an airplane. However, he opens his parachute too late, and disaster ensues. Scooby then yells, "Rop the rameras! Rop the rameras!" in which C.J. agrees. C.J. tells to Scooby and Shaggy how popular they really are by revealing a massive crowd of Scooby's fans outside the studio chanting "Scooby-Doo, we need you!". Fred, Daphne, and Velma are among them. In fact, all across Los Angeles, Scooby's fans are begging him to come back. Upon seeing this, Scooby realizes everyone truly loves him for who he is and agrees to go back to his original show. After things have quieted down in C.J.'s office, Shaggy (who doesn't want to go back so easily) knocks on the door, showing him the tape of his own pilots such as "Mork and Shaggy", "Welcome Back, Shaggy!", and "Shaggy and Hutch". Shaggy (tied up in the film reel) is then thrown out of the studio and he chases the Mystery Machine into the sunset, realizing that he, too, belongs on his old show.

== Cast ==
- Don Messick as Scooby-Doo
- Casey Kasem as Norville "Shaggy" Rogers
- Frank Welker as Fred Jones, Groove and Baby Scooby-Doo
- Heather North Kenney as Daphne Blake
- Pat Stevens as Velma Dinkley
- Rip Taylor as C.J.
- Stan Jones as Director, First V.P. and Terrier
- Mike Bell as Jesse Rotten and V.P. Jackie Carlson
- Marilyn Schreffler as Cherie, Sis and Receptionist
- Joan Gerber as Lavonne, Second Woman and Waitress
- Ginny McSwain as Kerry, Girl Fan and Executive Secretary
- Patrick Fraley as Brother, Guard and Announcer
- Paul DeKorte as Singer
- Debbie Hall as Singer
- Edie Lehmann as Singer
- Mike Redman as Singer
- Robert Tebow as Singer
