= The Scooby-Doo Show =

American animated television series

- Genre: Comedy; Mystery; Adventure
- Created by: Joe Ruby; Ken Spears
- Developed by: Ray Parker
- Directed by: Ray Patterson; Carl Urbano; Charles A. Nichols
- Voices of: Don Messick; Casey Kasem; Heather North; Alan Oppenheimer; Pat Stevens; Frank Welker
- Narrated by: Ron Feinberg (Note: In The Scooby-Doo/Dynomutt Hour)
- Composer: Hoyt Curtin
- Country of origin: United States
- Original language: English
- No. of seasons: 3
- No. of episodes: 40 (list of episodes)

Production
- Executive producers: William Hanna; Joseph Barbera
- Producers: Bob Singer; Iwao Takamoto; Don Jurwich; Alex Lovy; Art Scott
- Running time: 23–24 minutes
- Production company: Hanna-Barbera Productions

Original release
- Network: ABC
- Release: September 11, 1976 – December 23, 1978

Related
- Scooby-Doo, Where Are You! (1969–1970); The New Scooby-Doo Movies (1972–1973); Scooby-Doo and Scrappy-Doo (1979–1980)

The Scooby-Doo Show is an American animated mystery comedy series. The title of the series is an umbrella term for episodes of the third incarnation of Hanna-Barbera's Scooby-Doo franchise. A total of 40 episodes ran for three seasons, from 1976 to 1978, on ABC, marking the first Scooby Doo series to appear on the channel. Sixteen episodes aired as segments of The Scooby-Doo/Dynomutt Hour in 1976, while eight aired as part of Scooby's All-Star Laff-A-Lympics in 1977. A final set of sixteen episodes came out in 1978, with eight running individually under the Scooby-Doo, Where Are You! name and the remaining eight as segments of Scooby's All-Stars.

Despite the yearly changes in how they were broadcast, the 1976–1978 stretch of Scooby-Doo episodes represents, at three seasons, the longest-running format of the original show before the addition of Scrappy-Doo. The episodes from all of the three seasons have been rerun under the title The Scooby-Doo Show since 1980; these Scooby episodes did not originally air under this title. The credits on these syndicated versions all feature a 1976 copyright date, even though seasons two and three were originally produced in 1977 and 1978.

Outside the United States, reruns aired on CBBC in the United Kingdom until 2015. Like many animated series created by Hanna-Barbera in the 1970s, the show contained a laugh track created by the studio.

== Overview ==
Scooby-Doo creators Joe Ruby and Ken Spears, started working at ABC for Fred Silverman as production supervisors for the Saturday morning lineup; they were both involved in the development and production of the 1976–1977 and the 1977–1978 episodes (in 1977, they formed their animation studio, Ruby-Spears Productions, as a competitor to Hanna-Barbera).

== Plot ==
Mystery Inc. solves new mysteries in this show. The series also introduces Scooby-Doo's cousin Scooby-Dum (although in season 1, episode 5 Shaggy introduces Scooby-Dum as Scooby-Doo’s brother) who accompanies them on some of their trips.

== Episodes ==
Season	Episodes	Originally released	
Season	Episodes	First released	Last released
1	16	September 11, 1976	December 18, 1976
2	8	September 10, 1977	October 29, 1977
3	16	September 9, 1978	December 23, 1978

== Voice cast ==
- Don Messick as Scooby-Doo
- Casey Kasem as Shaggy
- Heather North as Daphne
- Alan Oppenheimer as Scooby-Dum
- Pat Stevens as Velma
- Frank Welker as Fred

== Home media ==
The first season was released on DVD by Warner Home Video (via Hanna-Barbera and Warner Bros. Family Entertainment) with the Dynomutt episodes they originally aired with as The Scooby-Doo/Dynomutt Hour: The Complete Series on March 7, 2006. The second season has not been released in a set, but some episodes have appeared on DVD. This leaves only four of the eight episodes ("The Curse of Viking Lake", "The Spooky Case of the Grand Prix Race", "Creepy Cruise" and "The Creepy Heap from the Deep") in season two that ran as part of Scooby's All-Star Laff-a-Lympics as the only episodes that have not yet been released on DVD from this 40-episode incarnation.

The third season was released on DVD as Scooby-Doo, Where Are You! - The Complete Third Season from Warner Home Video, H-B Cartoons, and WBFE on April 10, 2007. However, only ten of those originally aired under the title Scooby-Doo, Where Are You! in their initial run, and none of the third season was presented under the Where are You! title for 28 years following their broadcast debuts (the cartoons on the DVD set still feature the syndicated Scooby-Doo Show opening and closing credits).

All 40 Scooby-Doo Show episodes are available for purchase and download from the iTunes Store and Amazon, as either individual episodes or a season set. The first two seasons are grouped under The Scooby-Doo Show, while the third season is listed under Scooby-Doo, Where Are You!

DVD name	Ep No.	Release date	Additional information
The Scooby-Doo/Dynomutt Hour – The Complete Series	16	March 7, 2006	2 featurettes; Image gallery
Scooby-Doo's Spookiest Tales	2	August 21, 2001	"Vampire Bats and Scaredy Cats"; "The Headless Horseman of Halloween"
Scooby-Doo! 13 Spooky Tales: Around the World	4	May 15, 2012	"The Fiesta Host is an Aztec Ghost"; "The Harum Scarum Sanitarium"; "The Spirits of '76"; "The Ozark Witch Switch"
Scooby-Doo! 13 Spooky Tales: Field Of Screams	1	May 13, 2014	"The Ghost That Sacked the Quarterback"
Scooby-Doo! 13 Spooky Tales: Holiday Chills and Thrills	1	October 16, 2012	"Watt a Shocking Ghost"
Scooby-Doo! 13 Spooky Tales: Run for Your Rife	2	September 10, 2013	"Scared a Lot in Camelot"; "Hang in There, Scooby-Doo!"
Scooby-Doo, Where Are You! The Complete Third Season	16	April 10, 2007	1 featurette
Best of Warner Bros. 50 Cartoon Collection: Scooby-Doo! (Region 1, American version only)	7	August 13, 2019	High Rise Hair Raiser; The Headless Horseman of Halloween; The Harum Scarum Sanitarium; The No-Face Zombie Chase Case; The Ghost of the Bad Humor Man; "Vampire Bats and Scaredy Cats" (remastered); "The Chiller Diller Movie Thriller"

== See also ==
- Laff-A-Lympics
