= Mr. & Mrs. J. Evil Scientist =

Cartoon Characters

- Snooper and Blabber family
- First appearance: "The Big Diaper Caper"; Snooper and Blabber
- Last appearance: "Chilly Chiller"; Snooper and Blabber
- Created by: Hanna-Barbera

Mr. & Mrs. J. Evil Scientist are a family of fictional characters inspired by The Addams Family cartoons that appeared in The New Yorker. They appeared on the Snagglepuss and Snooper and Blabber animated television series and starred in their own comic book.

== Television history ==
The Evil Scientist family, consisting of J. (who is also referred to by his wife as "Boris" in his first animated appearance), his wife Goonda, and son Junior, debuted on October 17, 1959, when Junior was baby-sat by Snooper and Blabber in "The Big Diaper Caper". They subsequently appeared in other Snooper and Blabber cartoons, including "Snap Happy Saps", "Surprised Party", and "Chilly Chiller". They also appeared in a February 20, 1961 Snagglepuss cartoon titled "Fraidy Cat Lion".

A second version of the Evil Scientist family named the Gruesomes appeared as The Flintstones' next-door neighbors. A third incarnation of the family, which combined elements of both the Evil Scientists and Gruesomes, named The Creepleys appeared on Laff-A-Lympics.

A couple based on Mr. and Mrs. J. Evil Scientist appear in an episode of A Pup Named Scooby-Doo titled "Snow Place Like Home". In the episode, Scooby-Doo and the gang travel on a ski vacation to the spooky Snowy Mountain Chalet, which is run by a creepy-looking couple that make Shaggy and Scooby nervous. The gang discovers the resort is nearly deserted because it is haunted by an Ice Ghost, and they soon find out that the couple is being pressured into selling their resort by a slick businessman.

Hanna-Barbera later made two animated TV series based on the Scientists' inspirations, The Addams Family: one in 1973 and the other in 1992.

== Comic book ==
The Evil Scientist family made their first comic book appearance in Hanna-Barbera Bandwagon #2 (January 1963), published by Gold Key Comics. In their first appearance, they were featured as supporting characters to Snagglepuss. In the next issue (which was the final issue of the anthology series), they were featured in their own story.

In the fall of 1963, they were given their own comic book, which lasted four issues. The comic book was published annually during Halloween of 1963, 1964, 1965 and 1966.
