= Scooby-Doo and Scrappy-Doo (1979 TV series) =

American animated television series

- Genre: Comedy; Mystery; Adventure
- Created by: Joe Ruby; Ken Spears
- Based on: Scooby-Doo, Where Are You by Joe Ruby and Ken Spears
- Developed by: Mark Evanier
- Directed by: Ray Patterson; Carl Urbano; Oscar Dufau; George Gordon
- Voices of: Don Messick; Lennie Weinrib; Casey Kasem; Frank Welker; Heather North Kenney; Pat Stevens; Marla Frumkin
- Country of origin: United States
- Original language: English
- No. of seasons: 1
- No. of episodes: 16

Production
- Executive producers: William Hanna; Joseph Barbera
- Producer: Don Jurwich
- Running time: 22 minutes
- Production company: Hanna-Barbera Productions

Original release
- Network: ABC
- Release: September 22, 1979 – January 12, 1980

Related
- The Scooby-Doo Show (1976–78); Scooby-Doo and Scrappy-Doo (1980–82)

Scooby-Doo and Scrappy-Doo is an American animated television series, and the fourth incarnation of the Scooby-Doo franchise, produced by Hanna-Barbera Productions for ABC. It premiered on September 22, 1979, and ran for one season as a half-hour animated program. A total of sixteen episodes were produced. It aired internationally on BBC One in the United Kingdom from 1981 to 1984. It was the last Hanna-Barbera cartoon series (excluding prime-time specials) to use the studio's laugh track.

== Overview ==
ABC began threatening cancellation for the show, as the show's ratings were declining and Fred Silverman, one of the show's biggest backers at ABC, had left for NBC in 1978. ABC was going to choose between two shows: Scooby-Doo or an unnamed pilot from Ruby Spears Enterprises. Therefore, for its 1979–1980 season, Scooby-Doo was given a major overhaul, adding the character of Scooby's nephew Scrappy-Doo, voiced by Lennie Weinrib, and changing the name of the show to Scooby-Doo and Scrappy-Doo.

Although still present in these episodes, the characters of Fred, Daphne, and Velma became less essential to the plot, and it became more of a concentrated effort to try to make them relevant, once the new character's presence shed light on it. However, they ultimately were removed by the next season. Shaggy, Scooby and Scrappy were the main focus. Marla Frumkin took over Pat Stevens' role as Velma Dinkley towards the end of the season, beginning with episode 12, "The Ghoul, the Bat, and the Ugly".

== Episodes ==
No.	Title	Written by	Villain	Identity	Original release date	Prod. code	U.S. households (in millions)
1	"The Scarab Lives!"	Mark Evanier	The Blue Scarab	Howard Gruger	September 22, 1979	7901	4.73
The gang has to help a cartoonist after his superhero creation called "The Blue Scarab", who is Scrappy's hero, comes to life as a supervillain and begins committing crimes all over town while demanding that his creator stops making his comic books.
2	"The Night Ghoul of Wonderworld"	Glenn Leopold	The Night Ghoul of London	Mr. Marino	September 29, 1979	7903	4.04
The gang is trapped inside a theme park created to be like 19th-century London and soon find themselves under attack by its robot residents while exploring Velma's fantasy of solving a mystery with Sherlock Holmes regarding the Night Ghoul targeting the Crown Jewels. Note: This episode is a parody of Westworld with elements of Fantasy Island.
3	"Strange Encounters of a Scooby Kind"	Willie Gilbert	The Alien	Tessie	October 6, 1979	7902	4.58
While the gang tries to relax on a camping trip in the mountains, Scooby, Scrappy and Shaggy are kidnapped by an alien and it is up to Fred, Velma and Daphne to save them. Note: The title is similar to that of Steven Spielberg's Close Encounters of the Third Kind.
4	"The Neon Phantom of the Roller Disco!"	Diane Duane	The Neon Phantom	Bill Walker	October 13, 1979	7904	4.35
When a being known as the Neon Phantom appears at the Hollywood Bowl in Los Angeles and cuts out the electricity, the gang chases him all over the city to find out what he is up to.
5	"Shiver and Shake, That Demon's a Snake"	Duane Poole	The Snake Demon	First Mate Defarge	October 20, 1979	7905	4.43
While on vacation in the Florida Keys and the Caribbean, the gang encounters a menacing Snake Demon after Daphne buys an idol cursed by the Snake Demon.
6	"The Scary Sky Skeleton"	David Villaire	The Sky Skeleton	Eddie Drake	October 27, 1979	7906	4.43
When a skeleton pilot appears and threatens to ruin Daphne's friend Wendy's air show, the gang must solve the mystery and help Wendy.
7	"The Demon of the Dugout"	Mark Evanier	The Dragon Beast	Mr. Husai	November 3, 1979	7907	4.27
The gang goes to Tokyo for a baseball game involving the American Team vs. the Japanese Team for the Baseball Diamond. During the game, a dragon-like demon appears and the gang must solve the mystery.
8	"The Hairy Scare of the Devil Bear"	Unknown (previously listed as Mark Evanier; Evanier denies this.)	The Devil Bear	Chuck Hunt	November 10, 1979	7908	4.50
The gang investigates when a Devil Bear haunts an archeological dig in Indian caves within the Grand Canyon.
9	"Twenty Thousand Screams Under the Sea"	Glenn Leopold	The Sea Beast of the Aztecs	Tiger Morris	November 17, 1979	7909	4.04
The gang tries to solve the mystery of a Sea Beast that is haunting a surfing contest at the Mexican coastal town of Acapulco.
10	"I Left My Neck in San Francisco"	Willie Gilbert	The Lady Vampire of Cloud Bay	Lefty Callahan (Mrs. Corneil)	November 24, 1979	7910	4.65
The gang goes to San Francisco, where they encounter the Lady Vampire of the Bay on Alcatraz Island. The vampire strongly resembles Daphne, who sits out most of the investigation with a cold, but she is nowhere to be found when the vampire turns up, leading Scooby, Scrappy and Shaggy to think she is a vampire.
11	"When You Wish Upon a Star Creature"	Diane Duane	The Star Creature	Mr. Greenfield	December 1, 1979	7911	4.73
When Professor Spaulding of Green Hills observatory discovers a new star, it does not take long before the Star Creature comes to frighten everyone off.
12	"The Ghoul, the Bat and the Ugly"	Tom Swale	The Shadow Creature	Brandon Davies	December 8, 1979	7912	3.82
The gang attends the Batty Awards, a horror awards show, at Hillside Manor, and investigate when it is interrupted by an evil Shadow Creature.
13	"Rocky Mountain Yiiiii!"	Unknown (previously listed as Mark Evanier; Evanier denies this.)	The Frozen Ghost of Jeremiah Pratt	Will Henry Pratt	December 22, 1979	7913	5.72
The gang goes to the snowy mountains of Colorado for a skiing vacation where they meet the ghost of a pioneer who wants to find his lost caravan of gold.
14	"The Sorcerer's a Menace"	David Villaire	The Ghost of the Great Haldane	Morgan the Magician	December 29, 1979	7914	5.19
At a magic show in a hotel on Atlantic City's boardwalk, the ghost of the magician's former teacher appears and causes a valuable black pearl to disappear. The gang has to find it, and find out why
15	"Lock the Door, It's a Minotaur!"	Duane Poole	The Minotaur	Nick Papas	January 5, 1980	7915	4.58
While on vacation in Greece, the gang discovers that a Minotaur is scaring the locals away and they set out to find out why.
16	"The Ransom of Scooby Chief"	Glenn Leopold	Carl and Tony	N/A	January 12, 1980	7916	5.42
The gang arrives in New York City and drops off Shaggy and the dogs to look around Scrappy's old neighborhood. After Scooby and Shaggy are kidnapped for ransom, it is up to Scrappy and his puppy friends to save them.

== Voice cast ==
=== Main ===
- Marla Frumkin as Velma Dinkley (eps. 12-16)
- Casey Kasem as Norville "Shaggy" Rogers
- Don Messick as Scooby-Doo
- Heather North as Daphne Blake
- Pat Stevens as Velma Dinkley (eps. 1–11)
- Lennie Weinrib as Scrappy-Doo
- Frank Welker as Fred Jones

== Home media ==
A complete series set was released on April 28, 2015.

DVD name	Release date	Episode(s) included
Scooby-Doo and Scrappy-Doo: The Complete Season 1	April 28, 2015	All episodes
Scooby-Doo! 13 Spooky Tales Around the World	May 15, 2012	1. "Shiver and Shake, That Demon's a Snake"; 2. "Lock the Door, It's a Minotaur!"
Scooby-Doo! 13 Spooky Tales: Holiday Chills and Thrills	October 16, 2012	"Rocky Mountain Yiiiiii!"
Scooby-Doo! 13 Spooky Tales: Ruh-Roh Robot!	September 24, 2013	"The Scary Sky Skeleton"
Scooby-Doo! 13 Spooky Tales: Field Of Screams	May 13, 2014	1. "The Demon of the Dugout"; 2. "Rocky Mountain Yiiiiii!"
Scooby-Doo! 13 Spooky Tales: Surf's Up Scooby-Doo	May 5, 2015	1. "Shiver and Shake, That Demon's a Snake"; 2. "Twenty Thousand Screams Under The Sea"
