= Ron Feinberg =

American actor (1932–2005)

- Born: Ronald Aaron Feinberg; October 10, 1932; San Francisco, California, U.S.
- Died: January 29, 2005 (aged 72); Los Angeles, California, U.S.
- Occupation: Actor
- Years active: 1966–2000

Ronald Aaron Feinberg (October 10, 1932 – January 29, 2005) was an American character and voice actor who appeared in films and on television.

Just watched TV, Here Comes the Brides 1969, S2 Ep13 was Character Lorenzo Bush a conservationist.

== Career ==
At 6' 8", the towering Feinberg played the character "Fellini", opposite Don Johnson, in the post-apocalyptic film A Boy and His Dog. He appeared on television in Barney Miller, Mary Hartman, Mary Hartman, and Mission: Impossible, among other shows. He also voiced King Caliphim, the Lord of the Dead, and Gruff in King's Quest VI: Heir Today, Gone Tomorrow. He voiced the character Raiden in Mortal Kombat: The Legend Begins.

He appeared as the mentally disabled Benny Apa in the 1968 "Pray Love Remember, Pray Love Remember" episode of Hawaii Five-O; the character was under investigation for the murder of a college student. He also appeared in two other episodes: "Little Girl Blue" and "No Bottles, No Cans, No People".

In the 1980s, he taught acting classes at the University of Miami, in Coral Gables, Florida. He also voiced Eeyore in Winnie the Pooh Discovers the Seasons (1981), Titanus in three episodes of Teenage Mutant Ninja Turtles, and the tuba in Disney's Belle's Magical World (1998). Feinberg's other animation roles included Ming the Merciless in Defenders of the Earth, Doc Terror in Centurions, and Headstrong in The Transformers.

== Death ==
Feinberg died on January 29, 2005, in Los Angeles at the age of 72.

== Filmography ==
=== Film ===
Year	Title	Role	Notes
1969	Here Come the Brides	Stoker	
1974	The Missiles of October	Charles de Gaulle	
1975	A Boy and His Dog	Fellini	
1977	Thunder and Lightning	Bubba	
1995	Mortal Kombat: The Journey Begins	Raiden, Goro	Voice, direct-to-video

=== Television ===
Year	Title	Role	Notes
1969–1973	Hawaii Five-O	Benny Apa, Furtado, Luther	3 episodes
1970–1973	Mission: Impossible	Jenab, Kurt Eckert, Alvin Taynor, Stanley Luchek	4 episodes
1976–1977	Dynomutt, Dog Wonder	F.O.C.U.S. One	Voice, main cast
1979–1980	Diff'rent Strokes	Détective Morison	2 episodes
1981	Winnie the Pooh Discovers the Seasons	Eeyore	Voice, short
1982	The Incredible Hulk	Claw	Voice, episode: "Punks on Wheels"
1985	Hulk Hogan's Rock 'n' Wrestling	André the Giant	Voice, 26 episodes
1986	Defenders of the Earth	Ming the Merciless	Voice, 65 episodes
1986	Centurions	Doc Terror	Voice, 65 episodes
1986	Transformers	Headstrong	Voice, 4 episodes
1990	Talespin	Arnold, Coolhands Luke	Voice, 2 episodes
1990	The Real Ghostbusters	Count Von Bluekenporken, Boris	Voice, episode: "Witchy Woman"
1991	Darkwing Duck	Vladimir Goudenov Grizzlikof	Voice, 6 episodes
1994	Fantastic Four	Terrax	Voice, 2 episodes (replacing Tony Jay)

=== Video games ===
Year	Title	Role	Notes
1992	King's Quest VI: Heir Today, Gone Tomorrow	King Caliphim, the Lord of the Dead, Gruff	
1995	Shannara	Menion Leah, Stenmin, Telsek	
2000	Star Trek: Klingon Academy	Civil War Medical Officer, Wuhey, Federation Commander 1	Final role
