= The Mumbly Cartoon Show =

American animated television series

- Genre: Comedy
- Created by: William Hanna; Joseph Barbera
- Directed by: Charles A. Nichols
- Voices of: Don Messick; John Stephenson
- Theme music composer: Hoyt Curtin
- Country of origin: United States
- Original language: English
- No. of episodes: 16

Production
- Executive producers: William Hanna; Joseph Barbera
- Producers: Iwao Takamoto; Alex Lovy
- Running time: 30 minutes (6 minutes per segment)
- Production company: Hanna-Barbera Productions

Original release
- Network: ABC
- Release: September 11 – December 18, 1976

The Mumbly Cartoon Show is an American animated television series produced by Hanna-Barbera Productions and featuring the titular character, Mumbly, a cartoon dog detective. It was broadcast on Saturday mornings on ABC from September 11, 1976, to December 18, 1976 (with reruns airing until September 3, 1977) as part of The Tom & Jerry/Grape Ape/Mumbly Show. This compilation packaged reruns of the 1975 The Tom & Jerry/Grape Ape Show with Mumbly as a new component.

In the show, Mumbly is a private eye dog in a trenchcoat, who works with a human detective, Chief Schnooker, to catch criminals who often sport alliterative names. 16 episodes were produced. Mumbly was voiced by Don Messick, and Schnooker by John Stephenson.

The show was not a ratings success, and only lasted one season. However, in the next season, Mumbly was included in Hanna-Barbera's second crossover show, Laff-A-Lympics, on the villainous "Really Rottens" team. Mumbly was not a villain in his earlier show, but the character was a substitution for the actually-villainous Muttley from the 1968 series Wacky Races, who could not appear on Laff-A-Lympics as those characters were co-owned by Heatter-Quigley Productions. A predecessor to Muttley and Mumbly is the dog Mugger, who appears in the 1964 movie Hey There, It's Yogi Bear!.

The show was also broadcast in West Germany in 1982, Yugoslavia circa 1985/1986, France in 1978, and Poland circa 1983/1984.

== Episodes ==
No.	Title	Original release date	Prod. code
1	"Fleetfeet Versus Flat Foot"	September 11, 1976	85-1
2	"The Great Hot Car Heist"	September 18, 1976	85-2
3	"The Magical Madcap Caper"	September 25, 1976	85-3
4	"The Big Breakout Bust"	October 2, 1976	85-4
5	"The Return of Bing Bong"	October 9, 1976	85-5
6	"The Super-Dooper Super Cop"	October 16, 1976	85-6
7	"The Big Ox Bust"	October 23, 1976	85-7
8	"The Great Graffiti Gambit"	October 30, 1976	85-8
9	"Taking Stock"	November 6, 1976	85-9
10	"The Littermugg"	November 13, 1976	85-10
11	"The Perils of the Purple Baron"	November 20, 1976	85-11
12	"The Fatbeard the Pirate Fracas"	November 25, 1976*	85-12
13	"The Big Snow Foot Snow Job"	November 27, 1976	85-13
14	"Sherlock's Badder Brudder"	December 4, 1976	85-14
15	"The UFO's a No-No"	December 11, 1976	85-15
16	"Hyde and Seek"	December 18, 1976	85-16

^{*} Telecast at Noon (EST), Thursday afternoon, November 25, 1976, a Thanksgiving, as part of ABC's Thanksgiving Funshine Festival.

== Other appearances ==
- Mumbly appeared in the syndicated TV film Yogi Bear and the Magical Flight of the Spruce Goose (1987).
- Chief Schnooker makes a cameo in the Harvey Birdman, Attorney at Law episode "SPF".
- Mumbly is shown on a list in the Velma episode "Velma Makes a List".
