= Scooby-Doo in film =

American animated character

Scooby-Doo
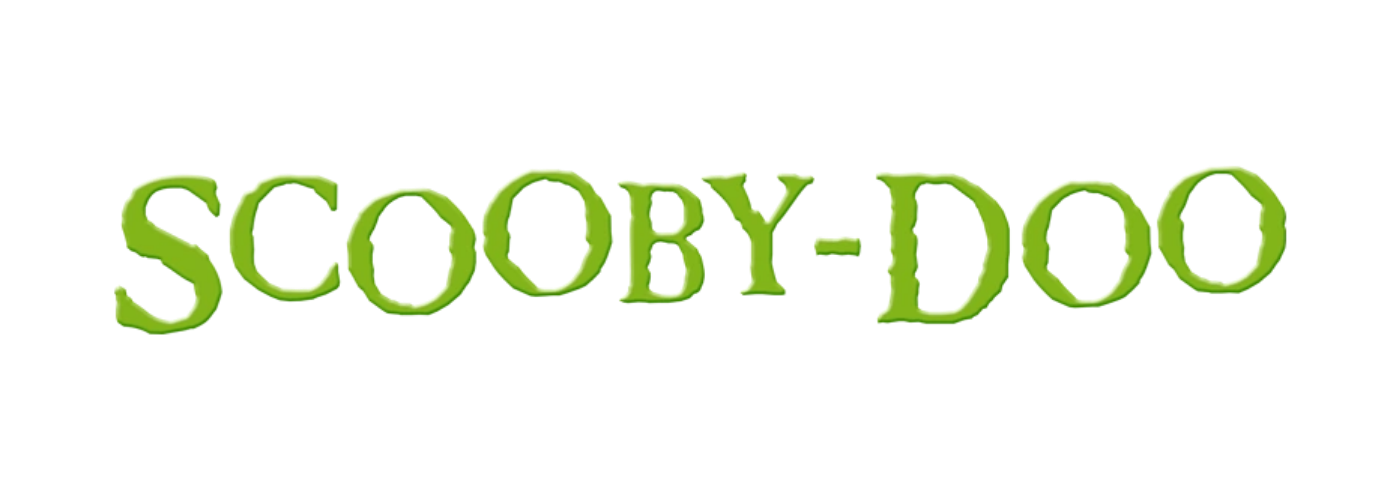
- Official film series logo
- Created by: Joe Ruby; Ken Spears
- Original work: Scooby-Doo media franchise characters created by Joe Ruby and Ken Spears
- Owners: Warner Bros. Entertainment; Hanna-Barbera

Films and television
- Film(s): Original series: Scooby-Doo (2002); Scooby-Doo 2: Monsters Unleashed (2004)
- Television film(s): Reboot series: Scooby-Doo! The Mystery Begins (2009); Scooby-Doo! Curse of the Lake Monster (2010)
- Direct-to-video: Spin-off: Daphne & Velma (2018); Animated films: Scooby-Doo! in Where's My Mummy? (2005); Scooby-Doo! & Batman: The Brave and the Bold (2018); Scoob! (2020)

The animated series Scooby-Doo has been adapted and appeared in five feature-length films since its debut in 1969, not including the series of animated direct-to-video films that have been in production since 1998, or the four animated television films produced from 1987 to 1994.

Toward the end of the 1990s, Warner Bros. and producer Charles Roven began producing a series of feature live-action films starring Scooby-Doo, beginning with the 2002 film Scooby-Doo, directed by Raja Gosnell. Gosnell also directed the 2004 sequel Scooby-Doo 2: Monsters Unleashed (2004). A reboot television film, Scooby-Doo! The Mystery Begins (2009), was released by Cartoon Network. Brian Levant directed the film and its sequel, Scooby-Doo! Curse of the Lake Monster (2010). A direct-to-video film entitled Daphne & Velma, with no connection to previous Scooby-Doo films, was released in 2018. An animated film titled Scoob! was scheduled for release in theaters on May 15, 2020, but was released direct-to-video on digital platforms due to COVID-19 closing most theaters in the United States and Canada. The film subsequently received a secondary theatrical release in the United States beginning on May 21, 2021, in selected markets. In December 2021, HBO Max confirmed the development of a further prequel film, Scoob! Holiday Haunt, the release of which was cancelled by Warner Bros. Discovery in August 2022, citing cost-cutting measures and a refocus on theatrical films rather than creating projects for streaming, despite the film already being completed.

== Background ==
Development for a live-action treatment of Scooby-Doo began in 1994 by producer Charles Roven. Originally the idea was to make a film with a much darker tone, essentially poking fun at the original cartoon series, much like The Brady Bunch Movie and was set for a PG-13 rating. Shaggy was set to be a stoner, Velma and Daphne had a side relationship, and there were many marijuana references.

Several rumors about these aspects in the original cartoon series were passed around by fans of Scooby-Doo, and were to be incorporated into the live action film.

== Films ==
=== Original series ===
==== Scooby-Doo (2002) ====
Scooby-Doo was released on June 14, 2002. Directed by Raja Gosnell, the film starred Freddie Prinze Jr., as Fred, Sarah Michelle Gellar as Daphne, Matthew Lillard as Shaggy, and Linda Cardellini as Velma. Scooby-Doo was created on-screen by computer-generated special effects and his voice was provided by Neil Fanning.

The plot shows the Mystery, Inc. gang coming back together after two years of separation, to investigate an amusement park called "Spooky Island", where they deal with real demons.

The release of the film was financially successful, with a domestic box office gross of over $130 million. However, the film was not well reviewed, but was a great hit with young audiences and fans of the show.

==== Scooby-Doo 2: Monsters Unleashed (2004) ====
Scooby-Doo 2: Monsters Unleashed was released on March 26, 2004, with the same cast and director from the first film.

The plot shows the Mystery Inc. investigating the plans of a masked villain who wants to control the city of Coolsville by using a machine to create monsters. Unlike the first film, Scooby-Doo 2 featured several of the monsters from the television series, including the Black Knight, the 10,000-Volt Ghost, the Pterodactyl Ghost, the Miner 49er, Captain Cutler and the Tar Monster.

The film underperformed at the box office, grossing $80 million in the US. Scooby-Doo 2 won the Razzie Award for "Worst Remake or Sequel".

=== Reboot series ===
==== Scooby-Doo! The Mystery Begins (2009) ====
Scooby-Doo! The Mystery Begins was aired by Cartoon Network on September 13, 2009, the 40th anniversary of Scooby-Doo. It was released on DVD and Blu-ray on September 22. Directed by Brian Levant, the plot is an origin story for the Mystery, Inc. gang, portraying the beginning of everything: how the gang met, their first mystery, their lives at school and how they got the Mystery Machine.

==== Scooby-Doo! Curse of the Lake Monster (2010) ====
Scooby-Doo! Curse of the Lake Monster was aired by Cartoon Network on October 16, 2010, with the same director and cast from the previous film. In this film, the Mystery, Inc. gang is heading towards a beach club, owned by Daphne's uncle, for temporary summer jobs. While involved with their tasks, they stumble on a new mystery.

=== Spin-off ===
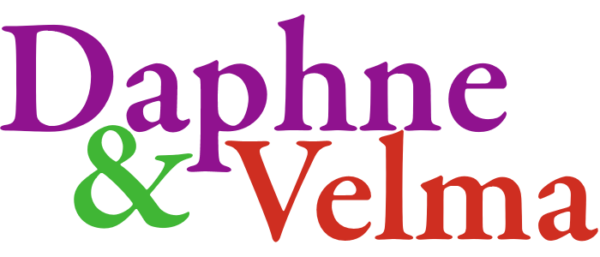
Daphne & Velma (2018) logo

==== Daphne & Velma (2018) ====
Daphne & Velma was released on DVD on May 22, 2018. Directed by Suzi Yoonessi, it features the title characters Daphne Blake and Velma Dinkley. The plot shows Daphne and Velma investigating mysteries in their high school. Sarah Jeffery and Sarah Gilman portray Daphne and Velma, respectively.

== Animated theatrical films ==
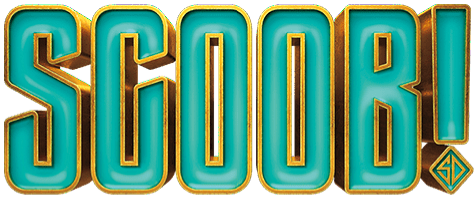
Scoob! (2020) logo

=== Scoob! (2020) ===
Scooby-Doo is the hero of his own story in Scoob!, the first full-length, animated film, which reveals how he and his best friend Shaggy became two crime busters. The story takes us back to where it all began, when a young Scooby and Shaggy first meet, and team up with Velma, Daphne, and Fred to launch Mystery Incorporated. They began working with the Blue Falcon to solve their most challenging mystery behind their mascot's secret legacy and purpose, which connects with Dick Dastardly's evil plan to unleash Cerberus.

Scoob! was released on May 15, 2020. Directed by Tony Cervone, the animated film voice talents is Will Forte as Shaggy, Zac Efron as Fred, Amanda Seyfried as Daphne, Gina Rodriguez as Velma and Frank Welker reprising his voice role as Scooby.

=== Scoob! Holiday Haunt (unreleased) ===
In June 2021, Cervone said that a sequel to Scoob! was in development. On December 22, 2021, HBO Max released a sizzle reel featuring a first look at a Christmas-themed prequel film, titled Scoob! Holiday Haunt, which was to be released on the service in December 2022. The film takes place in the gang's youth, with Welker and the actors who portrayed the younger versions reprising their roles while Cervone returned to write the film with Paul Dini as well to produce the project. The film was co-directed by Bill Haller and Michael Kurinsky, and had a production budget of $40 million. On August 2, 2022, Warner Bros. Discovery canceled its release, citing cost-cutting measures and a refocus on theatrical films rather than creating projects for streaming. Tony Cervone would go on to say on the same day that the project was "practically finished". Later that month, it was reported that the film would still be finished, even though Warner Bros. Discovery had no present plans to release it. The film was finally finished on November 4, 2022.

== Limited theatrical animated films ==
=== Scooby-Doo! in Where's My Mummy? (2005) ===
The film had a limited theatrical release in the United States on May 13, 2005.

=== Scooby-Doo! & Batman: The Brave and the Bold (2018) ===
The film was premiered at the TCL Chinese Theatre on January 6, 2018.

== Cast and crew ==
=== Cast ===
List indicators
- A dark gray cell indicates the character did not appear in that installment.
- An ^{A} indicates a performance through archived or previous work.
- A ^{V} indicates a performance through voice-over work.
- A ^{Y} indicates an actor or actress voiced a younger version of their character.

Character	Original series		Reboot series		Spin-off film	Animated film	TV series
Character	Scooby-Doo	Scooby-Doo 2: Monsters Unleashed	Scooby-Doo! The Mystery Begins	Scooby-Doo! Curse of the Lake Monster	Daphne & Velma	Scoob!^{V}	Untitled Scooby-Doo series
Mystery Inc.
Scoobert "Scooby" Doo	Neil Fanning^{V}	Neil Fanning^{V} J. P. Manoux^{V}	Frank Welker^{V}	Frank Welker^{V} Danielle. E. Hawkins Jane Oshita and Philip Albuquerque Luke Youngblood		Frank Welker	Frank Welker^{V}
Norville "Shaggy" Rogers	Matthew Lillard	Matthew Lillard Cascy Beddow^{Y} Nazanin Afshin-Jam	Nick Palatas	Nick Palatas		Will Forte Iain Armitage^{Y}	Tanner Hagen
Frederick "Fred" Jones	Freddie Prinze Jr.	Freddie Prinze Jr. Ryan Vrba^{Y}	Robbie Amell	Robbie Amell		Zac Efron Pierce Gagnon^{Y}	Maxwell Jenkins
Daphne Blake	Sarah Michelle Gellar	Sarah Michelle Gellar Emily Tennant^{Y}	Kate Melton	Kate Melton	Sarah Jeffery	Amanda Seyfried Mckenna Grace^{Y}	Mckenna Grace
Velma Dinkley	Linda Cardellini	Linda Cardellini Lauren Kennedy^{Y}	Hayley Kiyoko	Hayley Kiyoko	Sarah Gilman	Gina Rodriguez Ariana Greenblatt^{Y}	Abby Ryder Fortson

== Reception ==
=== Box office performance ===
Film	Release date	Box office revenue			Box office ranking		Budget	Reference
Film	Release date	Domestic	Foreign	Worldwide	All time domestic	All time worldwide	Budget	Reference
Scooby-Doo	June 14, 2002	$153,294,164	$122,356,539	$275,650,703	#230	#321	$84 million	
Scooby-Doo 2: Monsters Unleashed	March 26, 2004	$84,216,833	$97,250,000	$181,466,833	#651	—N/a	$80 million	
Scoob	May 15, 2020	$2,188,425	$26,400,000	$28,588,425	—N/a	—N/a	—N/a	
Total	$83,593,643	$237,510,997	$244,506,539	$485,705,961			$109,000,000	

=== Critical and public response ===
Film	Rotten Tomatoes	Metacritic	CinemaScore
Scooby-Doo	32% (146 reviews)	35 (31 reviews)	B+
Scooby-Doo 2: Monsters Unleashed	22% (119 reviews)	34 (28 reviews)	A-
Scoob!	48% (153 reviews)	43 (33 reviews)	—N/a

== Cancelled projects ==
In October 2002, during the filming of Scooby-Doo 2, Warner Bros. gave the green light for production of a third film. Dan Forman and Paul Foley were hired to write the script for Scooby-Doo 3. In August 2004, Matthew Lillard said in an interview that the third Scooby-Doo film was cancelled. "There will be no Scooby 3," Lillard said. "The second one didn't do as well as it was expected to do, and I completely hold that to Warner Brothers' fault. I think Warner Brothers made a mistake releasing it at the time they did March 2004. I think the movie's much better than the first movie, and I honestly thought it was going to do ridiculously good box office. But we had a bad timeslot. We had 13 movies open up in two weeks after we opened up. I mean, it did well, but it didn't do great, and it needed to do great", added, noting that the studio was quite disappointed with the result, which prevented the production of a third film.
