= List of most watched premieres on Cartoon Network =

This article lists all known Cartoon Network premieres that attracted more than 3 million viewers.

Rank	Episode	Series	Original air date	Viewers (in millions)
1	"Scooby-Doo! The Mystery Begins"	Original Movie	September 13, 2009	6.108
2	"Scooby-Doo! Curse of the Lake Monster"	Original Movie	October 16, 2010	5.130
3	"Ben 10: Alien Swarm"	Original Movie	November 25, 2009	4.019
4	"Ambush"	Star Wars: The Clone Wars	October 3, 2008	3.991
5	"Ben 10: Race Against Time"	Original Movie	November 21, 2007	3.987
6	"Rising Malevolence"	Star Wars: The Clone Wars	October 3, 2008	3.924
7	"Union of Rivals"	Dragon Ball Z	November 7, 2002	3.806
8	"Firebreather"	Original Movie	November 24, 2010	3.693
9	"Magic Ball of Buu"	Dragon Ball Z	November 1, 2001	3.649
10	"Gather for the Tournament"	Dragon Ball Z	September 26, 2001	3.624
11	"Shrek 2"	Movie	April 28, 2012	3.531
12	"The Losses Begin"	Dragon Ball Z	November 6, 2001	3.510
13	"Burning Low"	Adventure Time	July 30, 2012	3.504
14	"Million Dollar Babies"	Total Drama Action	September 13, 2009	3.502
15	"The Very Last Episode, Really"	Total Drama Island	December 11, 2008	3.459
16	"Finn the Human and Jake the Dog"	Adventure Time	November 12, 2012	3.435
17	"Vegeta's Pride"	Dragon Ball Z	October 29, 2001	3.389
18	"The Terror of Majin Buu"	Dragon Ball Z	November 7, 2001	3.349
19	"Day of the Great Devourer"	Ninjago: Masters of Spinjitzu	April 11, 2012	3.340
20	"The World Tournament"	Dragon Ball Z	September 28, 2001	3.331
21	"Wake Up and Escape from the Citadel"	Adventure Time	April 21, 2014	3.321
22	"Fionna and Cake"	Adventure Time	September 5, 2011	3.315
23	"Bigger! Badder! Brutal-er!	Total Drama: Revenge of the Island	June 5, 2012	3.306
24	"Hostage Crisis"	Star Wars: The Clone Wars	March 20, 2009	3.297
25	"Meal Time"	Dragon Ball Z	November 8, 2001	3.283
26	"Camera Shy"	Dragon Ball Z	September 27, 2001	3.221
27	"The Newest Super Saiyan"	Dragon Ball Z	September 24, 2001	3.214
28	"Take Flight Videl"	Dragon Ball Z	September 25, 2001	3.163
29	"Jake the Dad"	Adventure Time	January 7, 2013	3.191
30	"Planet 51"	Movie	February 20, 2012	3.188
31	"Terror Tales of the Park II"	Regular Show	October 15, 2012	3.109
32	"Rise of the Spinjitzu Master"	Ninjago: Masters of Spinjitzu	November 21, 2012	3.108
33	"Bad Little Boy"	Adventure Time	February 18, 2013	3.077
34	"Exit 9B"	Regular Show	October 1, 2012	3.047
35	"The Thanksgiving Special"	Regular Show	November 25, 2013	3.043
36	"Liberty on Ryloth"	Star Wars: The Clone Wars	March 13, 2009	3.009
36	"Frost & Fire"	Adventure Time	August 5, 2013	3.009
37	"The Smurfs: A Christmas Carol"	Special	December 5, 2012	3.005
