= Scooby-Doo! and the Witch's Ghost =

1999 animated film

- DVD cover
- Directed by: Jim Stenstrum
- Written by: Rick Copp; David A. Goodman; Davis Doi; Glenn Leopold
- Based on: Scooby-Doo by William Hanna, Joseph Barbera, Iwao Takamoto, Joe Ruby, & Ken Spears
- Produced by: Cos Anzilotti
- Starring: Mary Kay Bergman; Kimberly Brooks; Tim Curry; Jennifer Hale; Scott Innes; Bob Joles; Tress MacNeille; Peter Renaday; Neil Ross; B. J. Ward; Frank Welker; Jane Wiedlin
- Edited by: Rob DeSales
- Music by: Louis Febre
- Production companies: Hanna-Barbera Cartoons; Warner Bros. Animation
- Distributed by: Warner Home Video
- Release date: October 5, 1999
- Running time: 66 minutes
- Country: United States
- Language: English

Scooby-Doo! and the Witch's Ghost is a 1999 American direct-to-video animated supernatural comedy horror film, and the second of the direct-to-video films based upon Scooby-Doo Saturday morning cartoons. It was produced by Hanna-Barbera Cartoons and Warner Bros. Animation. The film was released on VHS on October 5, 1999, then on DVD on March 6, 2001.

The plot involves Mystery Inc. traveling to the New England town of Oakhaven at the invitation of horror writer Ben Ravencroft. Like a number of direct-to-video Scooby-Doo animated films released in the late 1990s and early 2000s, The Witch's Ghost features real supernatural elements instead of the traditionally fabricated ones the franchise is associated with, giving the film a darker tone. The film has been adapted into a book.

It is the second of the first four Scooby-Doo direct-to-video films to be animated overseas by Japanese animation studio Mook Animation. The film marks the first time voice actor and radio-personality Scott Innes voiced Shaggy, as Billy West (who voiced Shaggy in Scooby-Doo on Zombie Island) needed time for his voice work on Futurama. This was also the final film starring Mary Kay Bergman that was released during her lifetime. A sequel to the film, Scooby-Doo and the Alien Invaders, was released in 2000.

== Plot ==
After Ben Ravencroft, a famous horror writer of whom Velma Dinkley is a fan, assists her and Mystery Inc. in solving a case at a museum in San Francisco, he invites them to his hometown of Oakhaven, Massachusetts. When they arrive, they find the town's Mayor Corey has converted it into a tourist attraction based on the ghost of Sarah Ravencroft, Ben's ancestor who was persecuted as a witch and executed by the Puritan townspeople in 1657. Ben disputes this, claiming that Sarah was a Wiccan who used herbal remedies to heal the less fortunate and that he has spent years searching for her medical diary to prove her innocence.

While Scooby-Doo and Shaggy Rogers are chased by Sarah's ghost, the others are drawn to the Hex Girls, a gothic rock band led by Sally "Thorn" McKnight, during one of their rehearsals. Fred Jones and Daphne Blake follow Thorn and, upon discovering her seemingly performing a ritual, believe the Hex Girls are witches.

Upon capturing Sarah's ghost, Velma reveals her to be Mr. McKnight, Thorn's father and Oakhaven's pharmacist who posed as the ghost as part of a town-wide publicity stunt meant to stimulate Oakhaven's failing tourist economy and that he did so after digging up Sarah's grave despite not finding her body. Additionally, Thorn reveals the "ritual" she was performing is actually an herbal remedy for soothing her vocal cords and that she is one-sixteenth Wiccan.

Upon realizing that a buckle Scooby found earlier is actually the lock from Sarah's diary, the group return to where he found the lock and dig up Sarah's diary. To the gang's horror, the book is actually a witch's spellbook. A gleeful Ben reveals that he is a warlock, the stories of Sarah being a witch are true, and that she was imprisoned in her book by the Wiccans of her time. Furthermore, he engineered the museum mystery to manipulate Mystery Inc. into helping him and, though he did not account for Oakhaven's publicity stunt, used it to his advantage nonetheless. He subsequently uses the book to awaken his magical powers and release Sarah with the intention that she will help him rule the world. However, she chooses to destroy it as revenge for her imprisonment instead.

Disillusioned, Ben attempts to re-imprison Sarah, but she reveals only a Wiccan can do so and traps him in a magical sphere. Mystery Inc. attempts to get the book back, but Sarah reanimates several pumpkins and trees and enlarges a turkey to stop them. Amidst the chaos, Velma convinces Thorn to re-imprison Sarah. After the plan succeeds, the vegetation is restored, the turkey is freed from her control, and Sarah is pulled back into her book, taking Ben with her. A burning branch falls onto the book, incinerating it and preventing the Ravencrofts from returning ever again. Afterwards, Mystery Inc., the townsfolk, and the turkey celebrate with a fundraiser concert held by the Hex Girls to raise money to repair the town.

== Voice cast ==
- Scott Innes as Scooby-Doo and Norville "Shaggy" Rogers
- Mary Kay Bergman as Daphne Blake, Witch's Ghost and Girl
- Frank Welker as Fred Jones and Turkey
- B. J. Ward as Velma Dinkley
- Tim Curry as Ben Ravencroft
- Kimberly Brooks as Luna
- Jennifer Hale as Sally "Thorn" McKnight and Butter Churner
- Jane Wiedlin as Dusk
- Bob Joles as Jack and Dr. Dean
- Tress MacNeille as Sarah Ravencroft
- Peter Renaday as Mr. McKnight
- Neil Ross as Mayor Corey, Perkins and Exhibit Voice

== Production ==
After the success of Scooby-Doo on Zombie Island, which received better sales than Warner Bros. had expected, the team were tasked with creating a second Scooby-Doo direct-to-video film. Its predecessor was considered a one-off experiment and, as such, the crew producing it worked with little oversight from executives. For Witch's Ghost, this creative freedom was scaled back considerably. Warner Bros. suggested screenwriters Rick Copp and David A. Goodman. In addition, the studio requested the filmmakers "tone down" their content, as they feared Zombie Island had proved too scary for its intended audience.

Copp and Goodman's script concluded with the revelation that the townspeople were using the witch as a publicity stunt. The original team found this unsatisfactory, so Glenn Leopold and Davis Doi re-wrote the last third of the film, introducing the concept that the ghost is real.

== Soundtrack ==
To coincide with the release of Scooby-Doo on Zombie Island, Warner Bros. decided to release the album Scooby-Doo's Snack Tracks: The Ultimate Collection. It went on to peak at number 5 on Billboard's Kid Albums chart and stayed in the top 25 for over 26-weeks. This popularity inspired Warner Bros. to release a full length soundtrack for their next film, Scooby-Doo! and the Witch's Ghost.

Kid Rhino partnered with Warner Home Video and Cartoon Network to release the soundtrack for the film. According to Rhino VP Carol Lee, "We [worked] closely with Warner Home Video so that we're part of everything they do." She added the soundtrack to the film was, "treated like that of a theatrical release. We created a Music Video which appeared on the home video." On September 14, 1999, the soundtrack was released on CD and Audio Cassette, featuring songs by the Hex Girls, and Billy Ray Cyrus performing "Scooby-Doo, Where Are You?".

Track listing
No.	Title	Recording artist(s)	Length
1.	"Scooby-Doo, Where Are You?"	Billy Ray Cyrus	1:02
2.	"Hex Girl"	The Hex Girls	1:43
3.	"Earth, Wind, Fire and Air"	The Hex Girls	1:55
4.	"The Witch's Ghost"	The Hex Girls	3:10
5.	"It's a Mystery"	The Hex Girls	3:08
6.	"Scooby Snacks"	The Hex Girls	3:19
7.	"Zoinks!"	The Hex Girls	3:10
8.	"Those Meddlin' Kids"	The Hex Girls	3:17
9.	"Ghost Story"	Louis Febre	3:13
10.	"The Ghost Is Here^{[a]}"	Joe Pizzulo, Gary Falcone	2:21
11.	"Terror Time^{[a]}"	Joe Pizzulo, Gary Falcone	2:55
12.	"Scooby-Doo, Where Are You?" (Instrumental Mix)	David Mook, Ben Raleigh	2:43
Total length:			31:55

Notes

- ^{^[a]} From Scooby-Doo on Zombie Island.

== Release and reception ==
Scooby-Doo and the Witch's Ghost was released on VHS on October 5, 1999, then on DVD on March 6, 2001. The VHS included the pilot episode for Courage the Cowardly Dog entitled The Chicken From Outer Space shown at the end. In 2024, it was released on Blu-ray for the first time through the Warner Archive Collection, packaged with Scooby-Doo and the Alien Invaders.

The film earned a 50% approval rating on Rotten Tomatoes. David Parkinson of Radio Times, gave the film two out of five stars, saying, "This full-length cartoon featuring the ghost-hunting teenage detectives is something of a mixed bag." Joe Neumaier from Entertainment Weekly said, "Though slyly written, it doesn't have the punch of last year's Scooby-Doo on Zombie Island – but it's still scarier than The Blair Witch Project."

=== Accolades ===
Year	Award	Category	Result	Ref.
2000	Annie Awards	Outstanding Animated Home Video Production	Nominated	

== See also ==
- List of films about witchcraft
