= Davis Doi =

American animator and director

- Occupations: Animator. director, producer
- Notable work: Scooby-Doo; Care Bears

Davis Doi is an American animator, director, and producer known for numerous American animated series and television films, as well as various Scooby-Doo and Care Bears video productions. He has been a part of many Hanna-Barbera and Cartoon Network original productions.

== Career ==
He did assistant animation to Ralph Bakshi films, The Lord of the Rings and American Pop. He produced the Hanna-Barbera animated series SWAT Kats: The Radical Squadron. He co-produced with Larry Houston the second season of The Real Adventures of Jonny Quest. His work also includes Scooby-Doo on Zombie Island, The Smurfs and several other Hanna-Barbera animated cartoons.

Doi has received three Emmy Award nominations, one in 1994 for The Town Santa Forgot and two in 1998 for Cow and Chicken and Dexter's Laboratory. He was also nominated for a CableACE Award in 1996 for The Chicken from Outer Space, an animated short with the main characters from the eventual series Courage the Cowardly Dog.

Doi went on to work at SD Entertainment where he directed films and television.

== Filmography ==
=== Films ===
Year	Title	Credit	Notes
1978	The Lord of the Rings	Assistant animator	
1981	American Pop	Assistant animator	
1982	My Smurfy Valentine	Character designer	TV movie
1983	The Smurfic Games	Character designer	TV movie
1985	Pound Puppies	Character designer / design supervisor	TV movie
1985	Star Fairies	Design supervisor	TV movie
1985	GoBots: Battle of the Rock Lords	Design supervisor	
1987	Blondie & Dagwood	Character designer	TV movie
1993	The Town Santa Forgot	Producer / production design	TV movie
1994	Yogi the Easter Bear	Producer / story / production design	TV movie
1998	Scooby-Doo on Zombie Island	Supervising Producer / Story writer	
1999	Scooby-Doo! and the Witch's Ghost	Supervising Producer / Writer	
2000	Scooby-Doo and the Alien Invaders	Supervising Producer / Writer	
2001	Scooby-Doo and the Cyber Chase	Supervising Producer / Story editor	
2004	My Little Pony: Dancing in the Clouds	Director	
2005	Dinotopia: Quest for the Ruby Sunstone	Director	
2005	Candy Land: The Great Lollipop Adventure	Director	
2006	Bratz: Babyz the Movie	Director	
2007	Care Bears: Oopsy Does It!	Director	
2010	Care Bears: Share Bear Shines	Director	
2010	Care Bears to the Rescue	Director	
2010	Care Bears: The Giving Festival	Supervising Director	
2012	Hydee and the Hytops	Director	
2016	The Land Before Time XIV: Journey of the Brave	Director	

=== Television ===
Year	Title	Credit	Notes
1981	The Kwicky Koala Show	Character designer	
1981–1988	The Smurfs	Character designer / layout artist / design supervisor / storyboard artist	
1982	The Smurfs Springtime Special	Character designer	TV short
1982	Richie Rich	Character designer	1 episode: "The Maltese Monkey"
1983	Pac-Man	Character designer	
1984	Snorks	Design Supervisor	
1985	Challenge of the GoBots	Design Supervisor	
1985–1986	Paw Paws	Design Supervisor	
1985–1986	Yogi's Treasure Hunt	Design Supervisor	
1985–1987	The Jetsons	Character designer	4 episodes
1986–1987	My Little Pony 'n Friends	Model designer	
1987	Garbage Pail Kids	Model designer	
1988	The Adventures of Raggedy Ann and Andy	Background designer / model designer / producer	
1988–1989	Garfield and Friends	Storyboard artist	
1989	DuckTales	Storyboard designer	1 episode: "The Bride Wore Stripes"
1990	Timeless Tales from Hallmark	Layout supervisor / producer	
1990	Midnight Patrol: Adventures in the Dream Zone	Producer	
1992	Gramps	Supervising producer	TV short
1993–1994	Capitol Critters	Supervising producer	
1993–1995	SWAT Kats: The Radical Squadron	Producer	
1995–1997	The Cartoon Cartoon Show	Supervising producer	
1996–1997	The Real Adventures of Jonny Quest	Producer / director	
1997	Larry & Steve	Supervising producer	TV short
1997–1999	I Am Weasel	Supervising producer	
1997–2002	Dexter's Laboratory	Supervising producer	14 episodes
1998	Cow and Chicken	Supervising producer	3 episodes
2005	Alien Racers	Director	
2007–2008	Care Bears: Adventures in Care-a-lot	Director	
2009–2010	Angelina Ballerina: The Next Steps	Director	
2019–2024	Care Bears: Unlock the Magic	Executive producer	
2019–2020	Boy Girl Dog Cat Mouse Cheese	Executive producer	
