= Eric Radomski =

American television producer

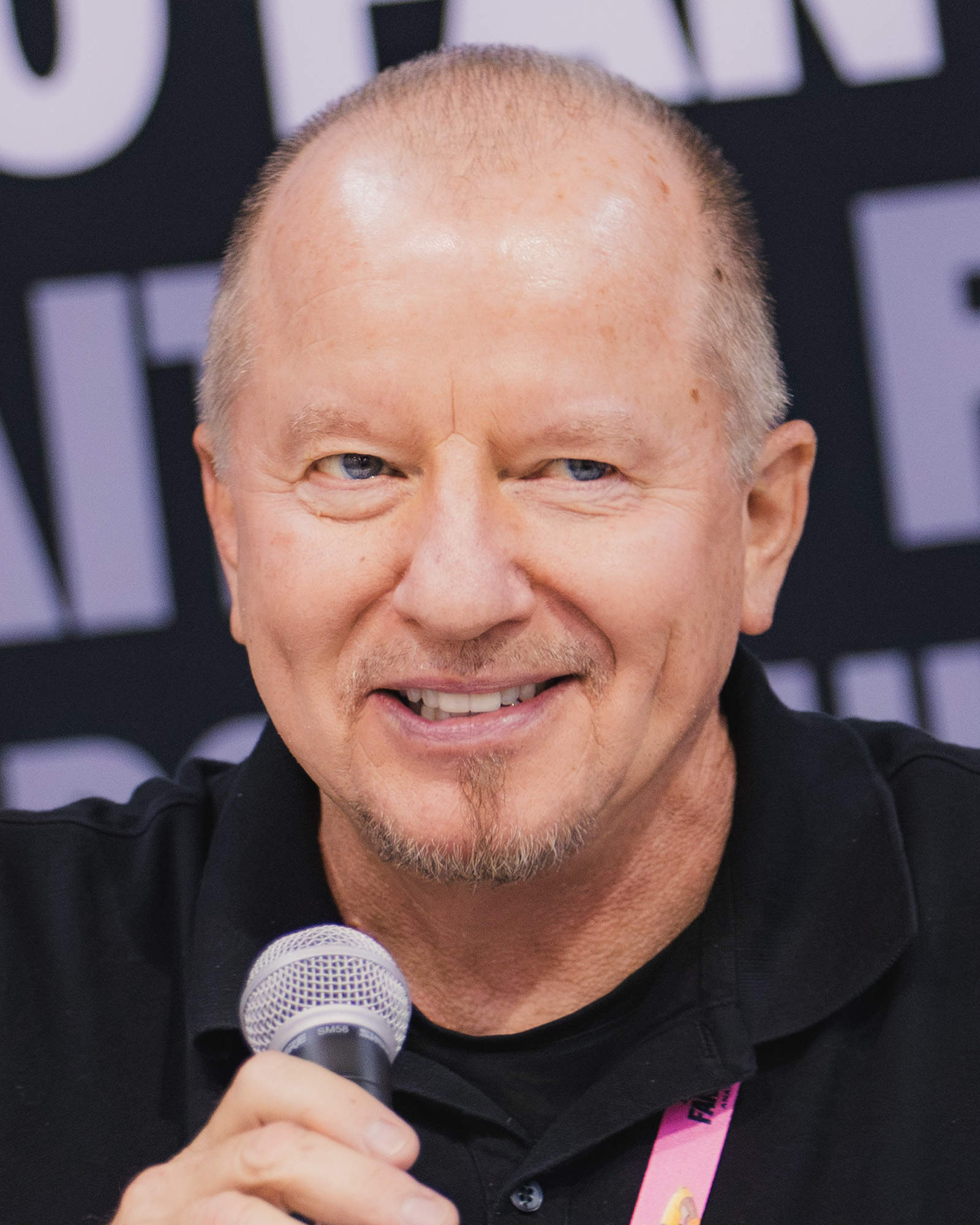
Radomski in 2026

Eric Radomski is an American television producer, best known as a co-creator of Batman: The Animated Series (as well as the co-director of the series' theatrical film Batman: Mask of the Phantasm). He has also acted as producer for Spawn: The Animated Series, Freakazoid!, Xiaolin Showdown, Shaggy & Scooby-Doo Get a Clue!, Ultimate Spider-Man, Avengers Assemble, Hulk and the Agents of S.M.A.S.H. and Guardians of the Galaxy.

== Career ==
Eric Radomski's career took off in the 1990s at Warner Bros. Animation with Batman: The Animated Series, with Radomski responsible for the show's iconic art style. After his contract with WBA expired, he joined HBO's Spawn. However, he returned to WBA for Xiaolin Showdown and Shaggy and Scooby-Doo Get a Clue!.

On March 7, 2008, Throwback Entertainment appointed Eric Radomski as its chief creative officer (CCO).

In 2010, he joined Marvel Animation as senior vice president, a role he held until 2020.
