= Mook Animation =

Japanese animation studio

Mook Animation Inc. 株式会社ムークアニメーション
- Company type: Kabushiki gaisha
- Industry: Animation
- Founded: September 13, 1986; 39 years ago
- Founder: Tetsurō Kumase; Yoshiyuki Momose
- Headquarters: Inagi, Tokyo, Japan
- Area served: Worldwide
- Key people: Tetsurō Kumase (Representative director)
- Number of employees: 46

Mook Animation Inc. (株式会社ムークアニメーション, Kabushiki-gaisha Mūku Animēshon) is an animation studio based in Japan and started in 1986. Mook Animation formed a business alliance with DLE in 2006 and was known as Mook DLE; however they ended their partnership in 2008. Mook has provided animation services for Western television programs and feature films, mostly for Hanna-Barbera and later Cartoon Network, such as SWAT Kats (four episodes from the first season and the entire second season), The Real Adventures of Jonny Quest (the second season). They also provided the animation for Æon Flux, Biker Mice from Mars, Men in Black: The Series, Todd McFarlane's Spawn, X-Men: Evolution, and Transformers: Animated.

== Subsidiaries ==
- Mook Soratia Animation, Inc.(ムークソラティアアニメーション): Established in 2010.
- SORATIA inc. (ソラティア株式会社): Uruma, Okinawa-based production studio.
- NEO Pictures Corporation? (株式会社 NEOピクチャーズ): Tokyo-based production studio.

== Animation services ==
=== Television series ===
- Bionic Six (1987) (additional services for TMS Entertainment)
- The Comic Strip (1987) (opening)
- Sylvanian Families (1987) (along with TMS Entertainment) (uncredited)
- Spiral Zone (1987) (additional services for Visual 80) (uncredited)
- ALF Tales (1988-1989) (along with Shaft)
- Beverly Hills Teens (1987)
- Diplodos (1988)
- COPS (1988-1989)
- Video Power (1990–1992)
- Æon Flux (1991-1995)
- The Twins of Destiny (1992)
- King Arthur and the Knights of Justice (1992-1993)
- The Adventures of T-Rex (1992–1993)
- SWAT Kats: The Radical Squadron (1993-1995)
- Biker Mice from Mars (1993-1996)
- Mega Man (1994-1996) (additional services for Ashi Productions)
- Skysurfer Strike Force (1995-1996) (additional services for Ashi Productions)
- Ultraforce (1994-1995) (opening)
- Street Sharks (1994-1997)
- The Real Adventures of Jonny Quest (1996–1997, second season)
- Mummies Alive! (1997, 17 episodes, intro, transformation sequences and stock footage)
- Men in Black: The Series (1997-2001)
- Todd McFarlane's Spawn (1997-1999) (with Madhouse)
- X-Men: Evolution (2000-2003) (with Madhouse)
- Stripperella (2003-2004)
- G.I. Joe: Sigma 6 (2005)
- Rocket Girls (2007, as Mook DLE)
- Transformers: Animated (2007–2009, with The Answer Studio and Studio 4°C)

=== OVA ===
- Animated Classics II (Aladdin, Pinocchio, Etc.) (1992-1993)
- Scooby-Doo on Zombie Island (1998)
- Scooby-Doo! and the Witch's Ghost (1999)
- Triangle Heart: Sazanami Joshiryō (2000-2002)
- Scooby-Doo and the Alien Invaders (2000)
- Scooby-Doo and the Cyber Chase (2001)
- Sin in The Rain (2006)
- Mosaic (2007)
- The Condor (2007)

=== Others ===
- Dosukoi! Wanpaku Dohyou (feature) (1994)
- COLUBOCCORO (pilot) (2007)
- Shimanchu MiRiKa (pilot) (2010, tied Media franchise to Okinawa Prefecture.)
