= Scooby-Doo and the Alien Invaders =

2000 animated film

- DVD cover
- Directed by: Jim Stenstrum
- Screenplay by: Davis Doi; Lance Falk
- Story by: Davis Doi; Glenn Leopold
- Based on: Characters by Hanna-Barbera Productions
- Produced by: Davis Doi
- Starring: Jeff Bennett; Mary Kay Bergman; Jennifer Hale; Mark Hamill; Scott Innes; Candi Milo; Kevin Michael Richardson; Neil Ross; B.J. Ward; Audrey Wasilewski; Frank Welker
- Edited by: Rob DeSales
- Music by: Louis Febre
- Production companies: Hanna-Barbera Cartoons; Warner Bros. Animation
- Distributed by: Warner Home Video
- Release date: October 3, 2000
- Running time: 71 minutes
- Country: United States
- Language: English

Scooby-Doo and the Alien Invaders is a 2000 American direct-to-video animated science fiction romantic comedy mystery film. It is the third direct-to-video film based on Scooby-Doo Saturday morning cartoons. The film was produced by Warner Bros. Animation in association with Hanna-Barbera. It is the third of the first four Scooby-Doo direct-to-video films to be animated overseas by Japanese animation studio Mook Animation. Unlike the previous films and despite the grimmer atmosphere, it has a lighter tone.

It is the last film to feature Mary Kay Bergman as the voice of Daphne, following her death in November 1999, and was dedicated in her memory. It is also the last film that longtime Scooby-Doo writer Glenn Leopold would write before leaving due to "creative differences" from Warner Bros. Additionally, it is the last film in the franchise to use cel animation, as starting with Scooby-Doo and the Cyber Chase, the films would utilize digital ink and paint.

== Plot ==
While driving the Mystery Inc. gang through the desert amidst a sandstorm, Shaggy Rogers accidentally drives onto government property before a UFO sighting causes him to crash near a small town. Shaggy and his dog Scooby-Doo stay with the group's van, the Mystery Machine, while the others head towards town to find help. Not long after, the pair encounter aliens who chase them into town. After reuniting with their friends in a diner, a waitress named Dottie says the locals have never seen aliens, but have seen strange lights and hear strange sounds at night. Chef Sergio adds cattle have vanished overnight, causing people to leave town. When a patron named Lester claims to have pictures of aliens, the gang travel to his home, only to learn he made paintings. Nonetheless, he offers to let them stay the night.

While sleeping on the roof, Shaggy and Scooby are abducted by the aliens before they are awakened in the desert by photographer Crystal and her dog Amber, who give them a ride back to the diner. While spending time together, Crystal claims she is an undercover government agent sent to investigate alien activity. Shaggy takes her to the caves where he and Scooby first encountered the aliens. They find gold deposits, but are chased by aliens and military police. Meanwhile, the rest of Mystery Inc. ask a local mechanic named Buck to fix the Mystery Machine, during which they meet Max, a member of SALF (Search for Alien Lifeforms). When Max takes them to meet the rest of his team, Laura and Steve, Velma Dinkley grows suspicious after seeing dried mud on the SALF team's boots. Taking her friends to a nearby canyon to confirm her suspicions, they find a dry riverbed along with mining equipment and gold within several caves before running into Shaggy, Scooby, Crystal, and Amber. The aliens capture Velma, Fred Jones, and Daphne Blake while the MPs cause the others to fall off a ledge. After the MPs leave to pursue them, the aliens reveal themselves as the SALF team, who discovered the cave is part of a 19th-century gold mine. Due to it being on government property, they kept it hidden, concocted their alien disguises to keep others away, and hired men to impersonate MPs to help them further.

Concurrently, the MPs corner Shaggy, Scooby, Crystal, and Amber, but the latter pair reveal themselves as aliens to rescue the former pair before rescuing the others and subduing the SALF team. Crystal and Amber reveal further that they were the ones who caused Shaggy to crash and used television signals from the 1960s to disguise themselves before sharing their goodbyes with Shaggy and Scooby and leaving Earth. Afterward, the SALF team and the MP impersonators are arrested and Buck repairs the Mystery Machine, allowing Mystery Inc. to resume their journey.

== Voice cast ==
- Scott Innes as Scooby-Doo and Shaggy Rogers
- Candi Milo as Crystal and Amber
- Mary Kay Bergman as Daphne Blake
- Frank Welker as Fred Jones
- B.J. Ward as Velma Dinkley
- Jeff Bennett as Lester and Fake MP #2
- Mark Hamill as Steve, Agent and Fake MP #1
- Audrey Wasilewski as Laura
- Kevin Michael Richardson as Max and Aliens
- Jennifer Hale as Dottie
- Neil Ross as Sergio and Buck

== Home media ==
The movie was released on VHS and DVD on October 3, 2000 for $19.96 and $24.98, respectively. Special features on the DVD include:

- "Making of" Special
- The Making of a Scooby-Doo! Video Game
- Scooby's Steps to Solving a Mystery
- Cast Fun Facts
- Trailers

== Reception ==
On Rotten Tomatoes the film holds an approval rating of 80% based on five reviews, with an average rating of 5.5/10. David Parkinson of Radio Times, gave the film a three out of five stars, saying, "This cartoon adventure is the best of a spate of feature-length spin-offs from the much-loved TV series." Carrie R. Wheadon of Common Sense Media gave the film a 3 out of 5 stars.
