= Shaggy & Scooby-Doo Get a Clue! =

American animated television series

- Genre: Comedy; Adventure; Mystery
- Based on: Characters by Hanna-Barbera Productions
- Developed by: Ray DeLaurentis
- Voices of: Scott Menville; Frank Welker; Jeff Bennett; Jim Meskimen; Casey Kasem
- Theme music composer: Mark Mothersbaugh
- Opening theme: "Shaggy & Scooby-Doo Get a Clue!"
- Ending theme: "Shaggy & Scooby-Doo Get a Clue!" (instrumental)
- Composer: Mutato Muzika
- Country of origin: United States
- Original language: English
- No. of seasons: 2
- No. of episodes: 26

Production
- Executive producers: Joseph Barbera (season 1); Sander Schwartz (season 1)
- Producer: Eric Radomski
- Editor: Myra Owyang
- Running time: 22 minutes
- Production company: Warner Bros. Animation

Original release
- Network: The CW (Kids' WB)
- Release: September 23, 2006 – March 15, 2008

Related
- What's New, Scooby-Doo? (2002–06); Scooby-Doo! Mystery Incorporated (2010–13)

Shaggy & Scooby-Doo Get a Clue! is an American animated comedy television series produced by Warner Bros. Animation, as the tenth incarnation of Hanna-Barbera's Scooby-Doo franchise.

The show debuted on September 23, 2006, and ran for two 13-episode seasons during the Kids' WB Saturday morning block of The CW Television Network, ending on March 15, 2008 with a total of 26 episodes. It was the final animated series to involve Hanna-Barbera's co-founder Joseph Barbera (who served as the Executive Producer for this show) before his death in December 2006. This is the first Scooby-Doo series where Shaggy is not voiced by Casey Kasem (being voiced entirely by Scott Menville), although he was included in the show in a different role.

== Plot ==
The premise of the show revolves around the fact that Shaggy Rogers' incredibly rich Uncle Albert Shaggleford disappears and names Shaggy as his sole heir for an inheritance. With the help of the inheritance, Shaggy has upgraded the Mystery Machine, giving it the ability to transform itself into a number of other different vehicles, like the "Hotdog Making Machine".

Dr. Albert Shaggleford had made some enemies before disappearing. Among the most dangerous is the archetypal evil genius and technology pirate out to take over the world and or become immortal—Dr. Phineas Phibes (who gets his name from the Vincent Price villain The Abominable Dr. Phibes). Phibes recruits other sidekicks and minions to help him with his plans, among them Dr. Trebla.

It appears that the supposedly late Dr. Shaggleford was, beyond being rich, an inventor in his own right, and his clueless young heir is now in possession of nano technology. The top secret nanotech formula has been mixed in with Scooby Snacks, which, when eaten, cause a variety of day-saving side effects.

Shaggy and Scooby-Doo have a mission: armed with an updated Mystery Machine, a loyal robot servant named Robi, their new riches, and the new and improved Scooby Snacks, they must stop the evil plans of Phineas Phibes and save the world. In episode 2, Shaggy upgrades the Mystery Machine from its original form, to a high-tech transforming vehicle. However, it usually transforms into machines inappropriate for the tasks at hand (however, in episode 11, it does transform into vehicles appropriate to finish the Polar Bear 3000). In their spare time, Shaggy and Scooby are fans of the show Chefs of Steel, and the famous mystery solver Chad Chaddington.

== Characters ==
=== Main ===
- Norville "Shaggy" Rogers (voiced by Scott Menville): Shaggy is no longer a vegetarian in the series.
- Scooby-Doo (voiced by Frank Welker): Shaggy's pet and best friend. He usually saves the day by consuming a nano-infused Scooby Snack which gives him an incredible power of some such.
- Robi (voiced by Jim Meskimen): A loyal robotic servant of Shaggy and Scooby-Doo. He is either defective or a failed experimental butler, but either way he has a tendency to bust through walls and other highly destructive things without second thoughts. Robi would also have different uses for Shaggy and Scooby, though he is a rather lousy cook, various impressions, and giving out safety tips (in a style similar to Inspector Gadget). He also projects holograms of Uncle Albert when he wants to talk with Shaggy. Robi also usually calls Scooby "Rooby Roo" due to misunderstanding Scooby's voice.
  - Sparky (vocal effects provided by Scott Menville): Robin's robotic dog.
- Dr. Albert Shaggleford (voiced by Casey Kasem): Shaggy's rich uncle who is a genius inventor, and was previously voiced by Brandon McCarter. He always sends a transmission to Shaggy from an undisclosed location on Phibes' doings. As of the final episode, it is revealed that he was undercover as Dr. Trebla all along ("Trebla" is "Albert" spelled backwards) and transmitting from Phibes' lair. It is also revealed that he is allergic to peanuts as seen when he was the only one of Phibes' minions to not take a peanut butter sandwich.

=== Villains ===
- Dr. Phineus Phibes (voiced by Jeff Bennett): A mad scientist and the primary antagonist of the series. In his younger age, Phibes conducted a highly dangerous experiment with electricity, which cost him his left hand (he wears a prosthetic that seems to function as a high-tech Swiss Army knife) and makes him a living lightning rod—hence, he seldom ventures outdoors, as doing so makes him susceptible to being struck by lightning, regardless of the weather. Producer Eric Radomski had this to say about Dr. Phibes: "Dr. Phibes' exterior lair is deco influenced, and in the 13th episode, we introduce a feline friend of Dr. Phibes. Ray DeLaurentis would need to confirm, but I believe your assumption is correct. Dr. Phibes is Col. Klink plus Dr. Evil divided by Strangelove."
  - Dr. Trebla (voiced by Scott Menville): Dr. Trebla is Dr. Phibes' right-hand man who gives him advice and sees to his needs like his constant companion. In the series finale, he is revealed to have been Uncle Albert working undercover all along revealing how he could give info on Phibes regularly to Shaggy and Scooby. A clue before this revelation is that his name is in fact Albert spelled backwards.
  - The Agents: Dr. Phibes' minions. By the end of the series, they were all rescued from the collapsing lair by Scooby-Doo and arrested by the authorities while Phibes got away.
    - Agent 1 (voiced by Jim Meskimen): Agent 1 is serious and hates Shaggy and Scooby. He often works with Agent 2, much to his chagrin, and the second in command. Agent 1 is also the one never to believe what his agents ever tell him, until he sees proof, as seen in "Zoinksman". He is often told to smack Agent 2 when he annoys Dr. Phibes. He is the only one who is more easily annoyed by Agent 2 than Phibes is.
    - Agent 2 (voiced by Jeff Bennett): Agent 2 is a somewhat dimwitted and heavyset man who resents his name and wishes to be called something else. Among other personas he's adopted was a ninja in "High Society Scooby" and a racer called Dr. Speed. In one episode, his real name is revealed to be Jeff, a reference on his voice actor's name, however in an earlier episode, he is called Zachary.
    - Agent 3 (voiced by Frank Welker): Agent 3 is a timid, but honest agent.
    - Agent 4 (voiced by Scott Menville): Agent 4 is a strong agent who has a dark complection.
    - Agent 5 (voiced by Jim Meskimen): Agent 5 is an agent that is not very bright.
    - Agent 6: A background agent. In "More Fondue for Scooby-Doo", he was revealed to have a crush on girl named Betty and depleted the energy from Phibes' laser to deface a mountain.
    - Agent 7: A background agent. In "Shaggy and Scooby World", he was subjected to a nano-technology that turned him into a frog. As a later temporary side effect, he still ate flies and had a prehensile tongue.
    - Agent 8 (voiced by Scott Menville): An Agent. In "Chefs of Steel", he was a test subject for Chef Suki Sukihara's hypnotic hibachi. In "Shaggy and Scooby World", he was subjected to a nano-technology that turned him into a fly.
    - Agent 12 (voiced by Frank Welker): Agent 12 is a tall and obese agent.
    - Agent 13 (voiced by Frank Welker): Agent 13 is Dr. Phibes' elderly father. In "Don't Feed the Animals", he ate some special leaves that were part of a longevity experiment.
  - Ricky and Mark (voiced by Jeff Bennett and Jim Meskimen): Dr. Phibes' "techies" who work as his hackers and engineers. They are parodies of Napoleon Dynamite and his brother Kip Dynamite. They work for Phibes and make evil inventions for his own use. Even though they work for Phibes, they will help Shaggy and Scooby if they need it.
  - Menace (voiced by Frank Welker): A super-strong villain who is Dr. Phibes' latest minion. After trying the nanotech formula, his strength was increased. After a while, Menace began to lose his mind. He developed a fondness for kittens (unfortunately for Phibes, who at the time had used some stolen nanotech to turn himself into a cat) and had smiley faces on his biceps. An obvious parody of Bane.

=== Supporting ===
- Fred Jones (voiced by Frank Welker): Daphne's boyfriend and a member of Mystery Incorporated. Made an appearance in "Shags to Riches" and "Almost Ghosts".
- Daphne Blake (voiced by Grey DeLisle): Fred's girlfriend and a member of Mystery Incorporated. Made an appearance in "Shags to Riches" and "Almost Ghosts".
- Velma Dinkley (voiced by Mindy Cohn): A member of Mystery Incorporated. Made an appearance in "Shags to Riches" and "Almost Ghosts".

== Episodes ==
=== Series overview ===
| Season | Episodes | Originally released | |
| Season | Episodes | First released | Last released |
|---|---|---|---|
| 1 | 13 | September 23, 2006 | May 5, 2007 |
| 2 | 13 | September 22, 2007 | March 15, 2008 |

=== Season 1 (2006–07) ===
| No. overall | No. in season | Title | Directed by | Written by | Storyboard by | Original release date | Prod. code | K6–11 rating/share |
|---|---|---|---|---|---|---|---|---|
| 1 | 1 | "Shags to Riches" | Jeff Allen | Ray DeLaurentis | Jeff Allen, Mike Borkowski and Tim Eldred | September 23, 2006 | 345–411 | 2.6/10 |
Shaggy's uncle disappears and leaves Shaggy with a billion dollars, so Shaggy and Scooby-Doo go to the mansion he left for them and start exploring. They see some of his inventions, and Shaggy sees a note about how someone is trying to steal his uncle's invention, forcing him to go into hiding.
| 2 | 2 | "More Fondue for Scooby-Doo" | Charles Visser | Scott Kreamer | Charles Visser, Marcus Williams and Tim Eldred | September 30, 2006 | 345–412 | 2.2/9 |
After receiving an urgent holographic transmission from Uncle Albert, Shaggy and Scooby travel to Switzerland, using their new and improved Mystery Machine, in order to thwart Dr. Phibes's efforts in interrupting an anti-global warming conference as part of his revenge on the conference's chairman Dr. Josef Gustav. Once Phibes realizes that he's being followed, he counteracts by sending one of his most dangerous agents after them.
| 3 | 3 | "High Society Scooby" | Jeff Allen | Scott Kreamer | Mike Borkowski, Tim Eldred and Mike Milo | October 7, 2006 | 345–413 | 2.3/10 |
Dr. Phibes' latest evil plot is sending Agent 1 and Agent 2 to abduct three of the world's leading scientists consisting of Dr. Blantz, Dr. Eisenhorn, and Dr. Von Puten in order to gain technologically advanced weapons. Shaggy and Scooby must prevent this by sneaking into Smarmington Briar Country Club where the scientists are being honored and protect them at all costs, while dealing with Phibes's agents.
| 4 | 4 | "Party Arty" | Charles Visser | Steve Sessions; Story by : Reid Harrison | Curtis Cim, Tim Eldred and Lane Raichert | November 4, 2006 | 345–414 | 2.4/9 |
Shaggy and Scooby decide to throw a housewarming party, but their neighbor and president of the Housing Association, Thurston Havansimp, threatens to cite them with enough code and permit violations to evict them from their house and the neighborhood. Meanwhile, Dr. Phibes hears about the party and sends a deadly robot called A.R.T. (short for Automatic Robot Tactical Unit) to the Shaggleford Mansion with orders to annihilate the dynamic duo.
| 5 | 5 | "Smart House" | Jeff Allen | Ray DeLaurentis | Abe Audish, Mike Borkowski, Tim Eldred and Edmund Fong | November 11, 2006 | 345–415 | 2.1/8 |
Dr. Phibes plans on unleashing an evil computer virus called Kevin into the nation's weapon defense systems, but Uncle Albert gets word of it first. While intercepting the virus, Shaggy and Scooby unknowingly release the virus into their in-house's computer system, which soon takes control of every appliance and utility in the mansion.
| 6 | 6 | "Lightning Strikes Twice" | Charles Visser | Ray DeLaurentis | Mario D'Anna, Tim Eldred, Enrique May and Lane Raichert | November 18, 2006 | 345–416 | 2.0/8 |
Drawing from his phobia of lightning from an incident that cost him his hair and left hand, Dr. Phibes creates a machine from his space station that creates thunderstorms across the world. Uncle Albert informs Shaggy and Scooby to face this rather than hide in the basement. Now Scooby must face his fear of lightning as he and Shaggy work on a way to stop Phibes.
| 7 | 7 | "Don't Feed the Animals" | Jeff Allen | Ray DeLaurentis | Abe Audish, Mike Borkowski, Edmund Fong, Stephen Sandoval and Marty Warner | February 3, 2007 | 345–419 | N/A |
After sending the Australian poachers Bruce and Brucie to abduct the primatologist Dr. Manuel Minkey, Dr. Phibes decides to destroy the rainforest to take all of the leaves that could lead to eternal life. In order for Scooby and Shaggy to stop him, they team up with some marmosets.
| 8 | 8 | "Mystery of the Missing Mystery Solvers" | Jeff Allen | Ray DeLaurentis | Abe Audish, Marcus Williams and Tim Eldred | February 10, 2007 | 345–418 | 2.2/8 |
Scooby-Doo and Shaggy are nominated to be Mystery Solvers of the Millennium, causing them to ignore a message from Uncle Albert and not being aware that the Mystery Solvers of the Millennium was fabricated by Dr. Phibes. When everyone begins disappearing whenever lightning strikes, it's up to the duo to save the day.
| 9 | 9 | "Chefs of Steel" | Charles Visser | Meredith Jennings-Offen | Mike Borkowski, Curtis Cim, Charles Grosvenor, Lane Raichert and Marcus Williams | February 17, 2007 | 345–417 | 1.6/6 |
Dr. Phibes invents a hypnotic hibachi to get Shaggy and Scooby to reveal the nano-tech formula and then hires an evil chef named Suki Sukihara to use it on them as they visit the set of their favorite cooking show, Chefs of Steel.
| 10 | 10 | "Almost Ghosts" | Charles Visser | Jim Krieg | Curtis Cim, Tim Eldred and Marcus Williams | February 24, 2007 | 345–420 | 2.4/10 |
Shaggy and Scooby travel to an army base run by General Macardle to stop Agent 1 and Agent 2, who have become invisible because of Phibes' invention. Fred, Daphne and Velma also join the crew, thinking that they are dealing with real ghosts.
| 11 | 11 | "Pole to Pole" | Jeff Allen | Stephen Sustarsic | Abe Audish, Mike Borkowski and Tim Eldred | March 3, 2007 | 345–421 | 1.8/7 |
In order to gain immortality, Dr. Phibes plans on setting off an EMP bomb at the end of the "Polar Bear 3000" race which will destroy all electronics across the world. Naturally, Shaggy and Scooby enter the race to make sure that he doesn't succeed. However, they discover that Phibes had planted the device in the Mystery Machine, forcing them to go back in time to stop the bomb from going off.
| 12 | 12 | "Big Trouble" | Charles Visser | Ray DeLaurentis | Mike Borkowski, Curtis Cim, Tim Eldred and Marcus Williams | April 28, 2007 | 345–422 | 1.9/8 |
After Shaggy and Scooby watch their favorite TV show starring Robo-Monkey, Robi receives a message from Uncle Albert saying that Dr. Phibes is trying to destroy them yet again with a giant robot.
| 13 | 13 | "Operation Dog and Hippy Boy" | Jeff Allen | Ray DeLaurentis | Mike Borkowski, Tim Eldred and Dan Riba | May 5, 2007 | 345–423 | 1.7/8 |
With the intention of finally stealing Uncle Albert's secret formula, Dr. Phibes assembles three of the most ruthless criminals in history consisting of Cat Lady, Mr. Invisible, and Menace to destroy Shaggy and Scooby.

=== Season 2 (2007–08) ===
| No. overall | No. in season | Title | Directed by | Written by | Storyboard by | Original release date | Prod. code | K6–11 rating/share |
|---|---|---|---|---|---|---|---|---|
| 14 | 1 | "Shaggy and Scooby World" | Jeff Allen | Ray DeLaurentis | Jeff Allen, Abe Audish, Mike Borkowski and Tim Eldred | September 22, 2007 | 345–424 | 1.8/7 |
On the opening day of Shaggy and Scooby's own amusement park, Dr. Phibes attempts to control every attraction and turn the park into total chaos. Shaggy and Scooby must prevent this while working to create a diversion for everyone in attendance.
| 15 | 2 | "Almost Purr-fect" | Charles Visser | Story by : Ray DeLaurentis and Will Schifrin, Script by: Ray DeLaurentis | Charles Visser, Cynthia Petrovic, Lois M. Lee; Tim Eldred, Mario D'Anna and William Mata | September 29, 2007 | 345–425 | 1.6/7 |
Phibes infiltrates Shaggy and Scooby's mansion in his new cat disguise while our heroes hold a dog show. Meanwhile, Robi enters his homemade mechanical dog Sparky into the show.
| 16 | 3 | "Inside Job" | Jeff Allen | Story by : Ray DeLaurentis and Will Schifrin, Script by: Ray DeLaurentis | Jeff Allen, Abe Audish, Lois M. Lee, Tim Eldred and Aaron Hammersley | October 6, 2007 | 345–426 | 1.5/7 |
After learning Dr. Phibes consumed a large quantity of the new nano-tech formula, Shaggy and Scooby must quickly devise a plan to rid of every nano-bot inside his body before Phibes becomes completely unstoppable and destroys a group of almost identical octuplets (four of each gender) known as the Nifties. Note: Kevin from "Smart House" makes a brief cameo in this episode, as do Fred and Daphne.
| 17 | 4 | "Zoinksman" | Charles Visser | Story by : Ray DeLaurentis and Will Schifrin, Script by: Ray DeLaurentis | Cynthia Petrovic, Lois M. Lee, Mario D'Anna, Chris Dent and Tim Eldred | October 13, 2007 | 345–427 | 1.8/7 |
Now fully nano-powered, Dr. Phibes plans to blow up his new remote volcanic lair which would cause nuclear winter and mass extinction around the world. Meanwhile, Shaggy arms himself with Uncle Albert's defective super suit as he and Scooby must infiltrate the lair and once again put a stop to Phibes's evil plans.
| 18 | 5 | "The Many Faces of Evil" | Jeff Allen | Steven Sustarsic | Jeff Allen, Abe Audish, Tim Eldred and Aaron Hammersley | November 3, 2007 | 345–428 | 1.9/8 |
Dr. Phibes's latest world domination plan includes producing a massive army of nano clones, each of which represents a different part of Phibes's personality. When Scooby consumes too much of the nano-tech formula, he becomes immune to the formula temporarily. In addition, Phibes argues with his evil clone named Evil Phibes over who should be the leader of their mission.
| 19 | 6 | "Cruisin' for a Bruisin'" | Charles Visser | Ray DeLaurentis and Will Schifrin | Cynthia Petrovic, Lois M. Lee, Curtis Cim and Tim Eldred | November 10, 2007 | 345–429 | 1.3/5 |
Dr. Phibes and Shaggy and Scooby are tired from their battles with each other, and they decide to go on vacation: unknowingly on the same cruise ship! They soon run into each other and call a truce. When Shaggy and Scooby's activities constantly disrupt Phibes's rest, he, Agent 1, and Agent 2 try to destroy them.
| 20 | 7 | "There's a Doctor in the House" | Jeff Allen | Ray DeLaurentis and Will Schifrin | Tim Eldred, Eric McConnell, Daniel Riba and Norma Rivera-Klingler | December 1, 2007 | 345–430 | 1.3/7 |
Shaggy and Scooby get a very unexpected new house guest — Phibes — when Evil Phibes has kicked him out of his lair and taken over. Although a broken Phibes promises to be on his best behavior, he proves to be a very inconsiderate roommate, and makes prank phone calls to his doppelgänger that get him mad enough to obliterate the world with one of Phibes' own devices.
| 21 | 8 | "Super Scary Movie Night" | Charles Visser | Ray DeLaurentis and Will Schifrin | Lois M. Lee, Curtis Cim, Chris Dent and Tim Eldred | January 26, 2008 | 345–431 | 0.7/4 |
Robi builds the Robivision TV Screen so Shaggy and Scooby-Doo decide to have a movie night. Dr. Phibes builds monsters like the Mummy, Frankenstein's monster, Count Dracula, a werewolf, and a gill-man-like swamp monster on discs. Shaggy and Scooby must stop him before he makes copies of the discs.
| 22 | 9 | "Runaway Robi" | Jeff Allen | Story by : Ray DeLaurentis and Will Schifrin, Script by: Ray DeLaurentis | Abe Audish, Lois M. Lee, Tim Eldred, Daniel Riba and Stephen Sandoval | February 2, 2008 | 345–432 | 0.9/5 |
Shaggy and Scooby decide to take up a training course to get fit. However, when things do not go as planned, Shaggy and Scooby secretly discuss that Robi is a terrible trainer. Robi overhears them by accident and sends his dog Sparky to continue his job while he runs away from home. He begins working at the Tough Guyz restaurant and gets seen there by Agent 1 and Agent 2 giving Dr. Phibes the idea to have Robi kidnapped and his memory of Dr. Shaggleford's inventions being extracted.
| 23 | 10 | "Don't Get a Big Head" | Charles Visser | Ray DeLaurentis and Will Schifrin | Cynthia Petrovic, Curtis Cim, Tim Eldred and Charles Grosvenor | February 16, 2008 | 345–433 | 1.2/6 |
Tired of always losing to Shaggy and Scooby, Dr. Phibes creates a new nano-formula to boost his intelligence. With his brain now nano charged, Dr. Phibes plans to make the whole world stupid.
| 24 | 11 | "Scooby-Dudes" | Jeff Allen | Story by : Ray DeLaurentis and Will Schifrin, Script by: Ray DeLaurentis | Abe Audish, Tim Eldred and Mark Koetsier | February 23, 2008 | 345–434 | 1.1/5 |
When Dr. Phibes returns to the ranch that he grew up on, he and his Techies make giant vicious animals like a hissing goat, one set of super-bulls that make sheep sounds, another set of super-bulls that make chicken sounds, and an 11 foot rooster named Cocky. With his new animal friends, he tries to have them take over the world. Can Shaggy and Scooby stop him before his animals take over the world?
| 25 | 12 | "Zoinks the Wonderdog" | Charles Visser | Story by : Ray DeLaurentis, Script by: Ray DeLaurentis and Will Schifrin | Charles Visser, Cynthia Petrovic, Tim Eldred and Mary Hanley | March 8, 2008 | 345–435 | 0.9/4 |
When Shaggy's old dog Zoinks returns, Scooby begins to become jealous of him, and finds his previous owner Groovy Don. Little do they realize, both Zoinks and Groovy Don were robots created by Dr. Phibes to split Shaggy and Scooby, causing them to find the true meaning of friendship when Zoinks and Groovy Don attack them.
| 26 | 13 | "Uncle Albert Alert" | Jeff Allen | Ray DeLaurentis and Will Schifrin | Jeff Allen, Abe Audish, Lois M. Lee and Tim Eldred | March 15, 2008 | 345–436 | 1.3/7 |
Uncle Albert sends Shaggy and Scooby a message revealing that he has been working undercover for Phibes all along. Phibes soon learns that there is a mole in his organization and plans to expose the person. After finding their uncle, the duo face an even bigger challenge as Phibes escapes and launches the self-destruct mechanism of his lair. Shaggy and Scooby rescue Uncle Albert as well as the agents trapped inside the lair, with Scooby using a "Hyper Speed Scooby Snack" given by Uncle Albert.

== Production ==
Ray DeLaurentis was asked by Warner Bros. Animation to develop a new show for the Kids' WB programming block. Due to internal struggles at Time Warner, DeLaurentis was only allowed to use characters associated with the Hanna-Barbera library and was offered Scooby-Doo as the previous series, What's New, Scooby-Doo?, was considered too similar to the original series and wanted something more broad. DeLaurentis developed the concept in "three and half days" when he decided to do a show that solely focused on the titular characters and, with the help of veteran Matt Danner, began to add the elements that would eventually make up the series. The character of Dr. Phibes was created because DeLaurentis was a fan of over-the-top villains and specifically chose Jeff Bennett to voice him during development.

The characters have also been redesigned to look like animated versions of how they appeared in the live-action Scooby-Doo film. For instance, Scooby is drawn with dot eyes and Shaggy's hair is noticeably longer. Thus, it is the second show in the Scooby-Doo series that is not animated or drawn in the usual Hanna-Barbera style, after A Pup Named Scooby-Doo. DeLaurentis commented on this; admitting that he was not a fan of the look of the final series, calling it "dark" compared to previous incarnations, "they just assigned those people to me… the unit production managers are literally the only people in the production that have no skill set [sic] are given this sort of leeway to drive people crazy." Eric Radomski was in charge of the design of the series.

This is also the first series in which Casey Kasem does not voice Shaggy, but is instead done by Scott Menville, although Scott Innes or Billy West portrayed the character in many of the Scooby-Doo animated movies made for television or home video. However, in this series, Kasem does voice Shaggy's rich and on-the-run Uncle Albert. Another noticeable difference is that Shaggy now wears a white short-sleeved shirt with a green strip across the middle and green sleeves instead of his trademark green T-shirt. Frank Welker still does Scooby's voice. In addition, Shaggy and Scooby's cowardice tendencies have been considerably toned down and are shown to be quite skilled.

Much like The 13 Ghosts of Scooby-Doo on ABC in 1985 (which had actual ghosts and monsters) and the Scooby-Doo and Scrappy-Doo shorts in 1980, this show is different from the usual "crooks masquerading as ghosts and monsters" series. The roles of Fred Jones, Daphne Blake and Velma Dinkley are downgraded, but they are not completely absent as they were in the Scooby-Doo and Scrappy-Doo shorts. They cameo in the first episode and have full guest appearances in another season one episode. Fred and Daphne appear as silent cameos in one season two episode when they were not allowed to Dr. Phibes's "attractive people" party. Their silhouettes run across the screen in the opening credits in amongst the silhouettes of all the show's regular cast. DeLaurentis revealed that the limited appearances were intentional as he wanted Shaggy and Scooby-Doo to develop as individuals and to provide a contrast as to how they have matured. However, he admitted that if given more time he would have made them appear more frequently.

The final episode "Uncle Albert Alert", was written entirely by DeLaurentis during a rather hectic time at Warner Bros. Animation. The building he was working in had already been sold to DeVry University and Amazon and he only had the weekend to write the whole episode, "[DeVry and Amazon] were literally jackhammering my wall… so I put in big wax earplugs… with some noise cancelling headphones over them… and I just wrote the episode." DeLaurentis had no ideas for a season three, but predicted that Dr. Phibes had implanted chips into all of his former henchmen that could turn them evil with a flip of a switch.

== Home media ==
Shaggy & Scooby-Doo Get a Clue! Home video releases
| DVD name | Release date | Episode(s) included |
|---|---|---|
| Shaggy & Scooby-Doo Get A Clue! Exclusive Bonus Disc | October 2, 2007 | “Operation Dog and Hippy Boy” |
| Shaggy & Scooby-Doo Get a Clue! Volume 1 | October 30, 2007 | "Shags to Riches" "More Fondue for Scooby-Doo" "High Society Scooby" "Party Arty" |
| Shaggy & Scooby-Doo Get a Clue! Volume 2 | July 8, 2008 | "Smart House" "Lightning Strikes Twice" "Don't Feed the Animals" "Mystery of the Missing Mystery Solvers" |
| Scooby-Doo, Where Are You! Volume 1: A Monster Catch | January 27, 2009 | "Shags to Riches" |
| "A Pup Named Scooby-Doo: The Complete Second and Third and Fourth Seasons" | March 17, 2009 | "Party Arty" |
| Scooby-Doo, Where Are You! Volume 2: Bump in the Night | May 5, 2009 | "More Fondue for Scooby-Doo!" |
| Scooby-Doo, Where Are You! Volume 3: Hello Mummy | September 1, 2009 | "High Society Scooby" |
| Scooby-Doo, Where Are You! Volume 4: Spooky Bayou | October 19, 2010 | "Lightning Strikes Twice" |
| The 13 Ghosts of Scooby-Doo! The Complete Series | June 29, 2010 | "Don't Feed the Animals" |
| Scooby-Doo! 13 Spooky Tales For The Love of Snack | January 7, 2014 | "The Many Faces of Evil" |
| Scooby-Doo! 13 Spooky Tales Surf's Up Scooby-Doo | May 5, 2015 | "Cruisin' for a Bruisin'" |
| Best of Warner Bros. 50 Cartoon Collection: Scooby-Doo! | August 13, 2019 | "Chefs of Steel" "Almost Ghosts" |
