= Kate Melton =

American actress

- Born: June 23, 1992 (age 34); Oklahoma City, Oklahoma, U.S.
- Occupation: Actress
- Years active: 2006–2010

Kate Melton (born June 23, 1992) is an American actress. She is best known for playing as Daphne Blake in two Scooby-Doo live-action prequel films, Scooby-Doo! The Mystery Begins and Scooby-Doo! Curse of the Lake Monster.

Robert Lloyd in Los Angeles Times wrote that she did "splendid work" as "resourceful Daphne" in Scooby-Doo! The Mystery Begins.

She is from Edmond, Oklahoma.

She currently works as a coach, teaching young people how to become an actor and get TV roles.

== Filmography ==
Year	Title	Role	Notes
2006	Freaky Faron	Brianne Vandergreen	as Kaitlyn Melton
2006	Timmy	Girlfriend	as Kaitlyn Melton
2007	Friday Night Lights	Teen Girl/Goth	1 episode
2008	Lucy: A Period Piece	Courtney	
2009	Scooby-Doo! The Mystery Begins	Daphne Blake	Reboot of the Scooby-Doo franchise
2010	Scooby-Doo! Curse of the Lake Monster	Daphne Blake	Reboot of the Scooby-Doo franchise
