= Daphne Blake =

Fictional character from Scooby-Doo

- Scooby-Doo character
- First appearance: "What a Night for a Knight"; Scooby-Doo, Where Are You!; September 13, 1969
- Created by: Joe Ruby; Ken Spears
- Designed by: Iwao Takamoto
- Voiced by: Stefanianna Christopherson (1969–1970); Heather North (1970–1997, 2003); Kellie Martin (young; 1988–1991); Mary Kay Bergman (1998–2000); Grey Griffin (2000–present); Adrienne Wilkinson (2004); Amanda Seyfried (2020); Mckenna Grace (young; 2020–2022); Constance Wu (Velma; 2023–2024); (see below)
- Portrayed by: Sarah Michelle Gellar (2002–2004); Emily Tennant (young; 2004); Kate Melton (2009–2010); Sarah Jeffery (2018); Mckenna Grace (2027); (see below)

In-universe information
- Gender: Female

Daphne Blake is a fictional cartoon character in the Scooby-Doo franchise, and one of the five main protagonists of the franchise. She is a core member of Mystery Incorporated, a group of young people that investigate paranormal occurrences, usually uncovering crimes in the process.

Daphne debuted in the pilot episode of Scooby-Doo, Where Are You!, alongside the other core characters, Fred Jones, Velma Dinkley, Shaggy Rogers, and Scooby-Doo. She was inspired by the character of Thalia Menninger from The Many Loves of Dobie Gillis.

Daphne is depicted as coming from a wealthy family and is noted for her beauty, fashion sense, and her knack for getting into danger, hence the nickname "Danger-Prone Daphne". Later incarnations gave the character more agency, but the core aspects of the character have persisted throughout the franchise, including her catchphrase "Jeepers!".

== Creation ==
Daphne Blake first appeared in the pilot episode Scooby-Doo, Where Are You!, "What a Night for a Knight" (September 13, 1969). She was created by Joe Ruby, Ken Spears, and Iwao Takamoto.

In early drafts for the series, Mysteries Five, Daphne was named Kelly and was a member of the titular crime-solving band. These aspects were dropped, with the names of each character changing.

The character of Daphne was inspired by Thalia Menninger, a sophisticated teenage character portrayed by Tuesday Weld, in the late 1950s and early 1960s American sitcom The Many Loves of Dobie Gillis.

== Character description ==
Daphne Blake is a core member of Mystery Incorporated, working alongside Fred Jones, Velma Dinkley, Shaggy Rogers, and Shaggy's Great Dane, Scooby-Doo, to solve various mysteries. In the first series, she is depicted as capable of solving mysteries, though she is occasionally clumsy and prone to getting into dangerous situations, earning her the nickname "Danger-Prone Daphne", highlighting her role as the damsel in distress. However, as the franchise progressed, her character evolved into a more independent and capable investigator. Daphne is also known for frequently using the exclamation "Jeepers" to express surprise, first appearing in the Scooby-Doo, Where Are You! episode "What the Hex Going On?".

Daphne is often depicted as being from the fictional town of Coolsville, being from a wealthy family, and having met the rest of Mystery Incorporated at a young age. Her parents were named Elizabeth and Nedley Blake in A Pup Named Scooby-Doo, The New Scooby and Scrappy-Doo Show and Daphne and Velma.

When the original Mystery Inc. group took a hiatus from the franchise in the 1980s, Daphne was initially absent too, with the series focusing on the comedy antics of Scooby, Shaggy, and Scrappy. However, when the "Whodunnit?" aspect returned to the series with The New Scooby and Scrappy-Doo Show (later retitled The New Scooby-Doo Mysteries), Daphne returned, now an accomplished investigator assisted by Shaggy and the two dogs, investigating supernatural occurrences. She continued to help Scooby battle evil forces of the supernatural in The 13 Ghosts of Scooby-Doo.

In A Pup Named Scooby-Doo, a young Daphne is a member of the young Mystery Incorporated, and is portrayed as a cynic towards supernatural occurrences.

In the film Scooby-Doo on Zombie Island, Daphne had a successful investigative TV series called Coast to Coast with Daphne Blake, with Fred Jones as the producer.

Unlike the previous incarnations of the character, Sarah Michelle Gellar's live-action portrayal of Daphne is trained in martial arts during Mystery Inc.'s 2-year-long departure in the first film, as she is tired of being a damsel in distress. This subversion of the damsel in distress mirrors Gellar's widely recognized role of the title character in the TV series Buffy the Vampire Slayer. Following the first live action Scooby-Doo film, Daphne next appeared in What's New, Scooby-Doo?. This incarnation, as well as in the animated films of the time, gave Daphne a more active role within the team, reflecting the live-action incarnation of the character. She would take on many new attributes, such as being an accomplished surfer, martial artist, and using her knowledge on makeup and fashion for tactical purposes.

Following What's New Scooby-Doo?, the other members of the gang would take a reduced role in Shaggy & Scooby-Doo Get a Clue!. She would next appear in Scooby-Doo: Mystery Incorporated, where she attends high school with the gang in the fictional town of Crystal Cove and has a complicated relationship with Fred. Her parents are named Nan and Barty Blake in this incarnation. They have five other daughters and disapprove of Daphne's involvement with Mystery Inc and her relationship with Fred.

In Be Cool, Scooby-Doo!, Daphne develops a kooky personality and performs multiple hobbies and interests such as hand puppets, beards, and vampires.

In Velma, Daphne is portrayed as an Asian-American foundling adopted by two mothers, detectives Donna and Linda Blake, with "complicated feelings" for Velma. In the fifth episode, it is revealed her biological parents are part of a Captain Caveman cult.

=== Appearance ===
Daphne's original and most common appearance in the franchise consists of a purple mini-dress, pink pantyhose, purple shoes, and a green scarf. In Scooby-Doo on Zombie Island, Scooby-Doo! and the Witch's Ghost, and Scooby-Doo and the Cyber Chase, she wears a purple and green three-piece suit with matching shoes. She no longer wore her green scarf in What's New, Scooby Doo?. She also has various outfits for different activities, including winter clothes, bikinis, and as a temporary member of the Hex Girls known as Crush. Her colour scheme of purple remains consistent throughout most of her outfits.

As a child, she wears a pink sweater, red skirt, and pink pantyhose with white go-go boots, which she hates getting dirty. In The 13 Ghosts of Scooby-Doo, she wears other purple and pink clothes, such as a purple jumpsuit and a purple dress with a white belt. In live action, she wears many different outfits, all in shades of purple or pink. She wears many disguises throughout her many incarnations, as does every member of the group.

=== Love interests ===
Throughout the various incarnations of the character, there has been speculation that Daphne and Fred had an attraction toward each other. This is emphasized in many of the direct-to-video films, the Johnny Bravo crossover, and the TV series Scooby-Doo! Mystery Incorporated, in which Daphne initially has an unrequited crush on Fred, who is oblivious. By the time of the second season, they are shown to be actively dating, showing more of their feelings toward each other. Throughout the franchise, Daphne and Fred have been jealous of the other showing attraction or interest in other people, such as Bram and Jessica.

Initially, the 2002 Scooby-Doo would have had Velma "eyeballing" Daphne, but this was later scrapped, as well as a kiss between the characters. In the released version of the film, Daphne and Fred develop a romantic interest in each other and briefly kiss after saving Spooky Island. In the sequel Scooby-Doo 2: Monsters Unleashed, they are in a relationship.

In the Velma series, Daphne has romantic feelings towards Velma.

== Performers ==
=== Voice actors ===
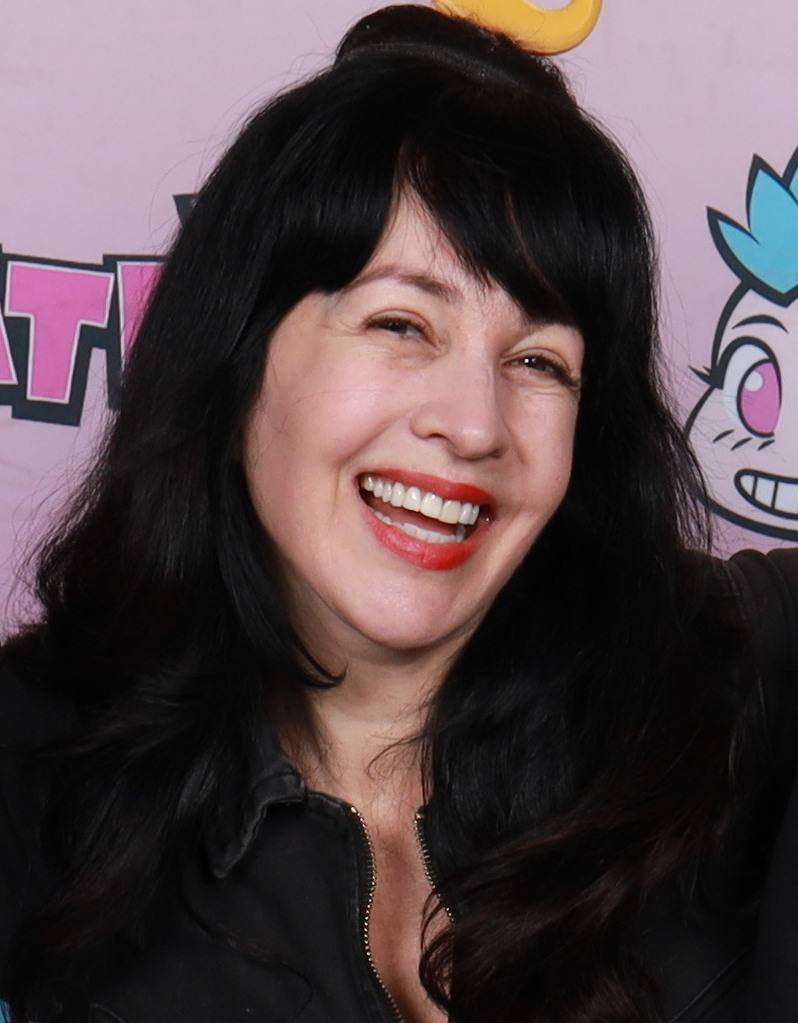
Grey DeLisle has voiced Daphne for over 20 years.

Daphne was first voiced by Stefanianna Christopherson in the first season of Scooby-Doo, Where Are You!, before being replaced by Heather North in the second. Heather would voice the character from 1970 to 1985, providing her voice to The New Scooby-Doo Movies, The Scooby-Doo Show, Scooby-Doo and Scrappy-Doo, The New Scooby and Scrappy-Doo Show, and The 13 Ghosts of Scooby-Doo. North would return for the 1997 Johnny Bravo crossover episode and the 2003 films Scooby-Doo! and the Legend of the Vampire, and Scooby-Doo! and the Monster of Mexico.

Kellie Martin would portray a young Daphne in A Pup Named Scooby-Doo. Mary Kay Bergman would next provide the character's voice beginning with the 1998 film, Scooby-Doo on Zombie Island, followed by Scooby-Doo! and the Witch's Ghost, The Scooby-Doo Project, Scooby-Doo! Mystery of the Fun Park Phantom, and Scooby-Doo and the Alien Invaders. Following Bergman's death, her close friend Grey Delisle took over the voice, beginning with Scooby-Doo and the Cyber Chase. Delisle has voiced the character since, with few exceptions. Daphne appears in the 2020 theatrical film, Scoob!, where she is voiced by Amanda Seyfried, and Mckenna Grace as a child. Mckenna Grace also provided voice work for the cancelled Scoob! Holiday Haunt. Constance Wu would portray the character in the adult-oriented Velma series.

==== Additional voice actors ====
- Norma MacMillan (1971; Kenner Talking Show Projector record)
- Robyn Moore (1981; Pauls commercial)
- Adrienne Wilkinson (2004; Scooby-Doo 2: Monsters Unleashed: The Video Game)

==== Parodies ====
- Cree Summer (2005; Drawn Together)
- Sarah Michelle Gellar (2005, 2012, 2018; Robot Chicken)
- Rachel Ramras (2011, 2013; Mad)
- Erin Cottrell (2015; Robot Chicken)

=== Live-action portrayals ===
Daphne Blake portrayals

Sarah Michelle Gellar in Scooby-Doo 2: Monsters Unleashed

Kate Melton in Scooby-Doo! The Mystery Begins

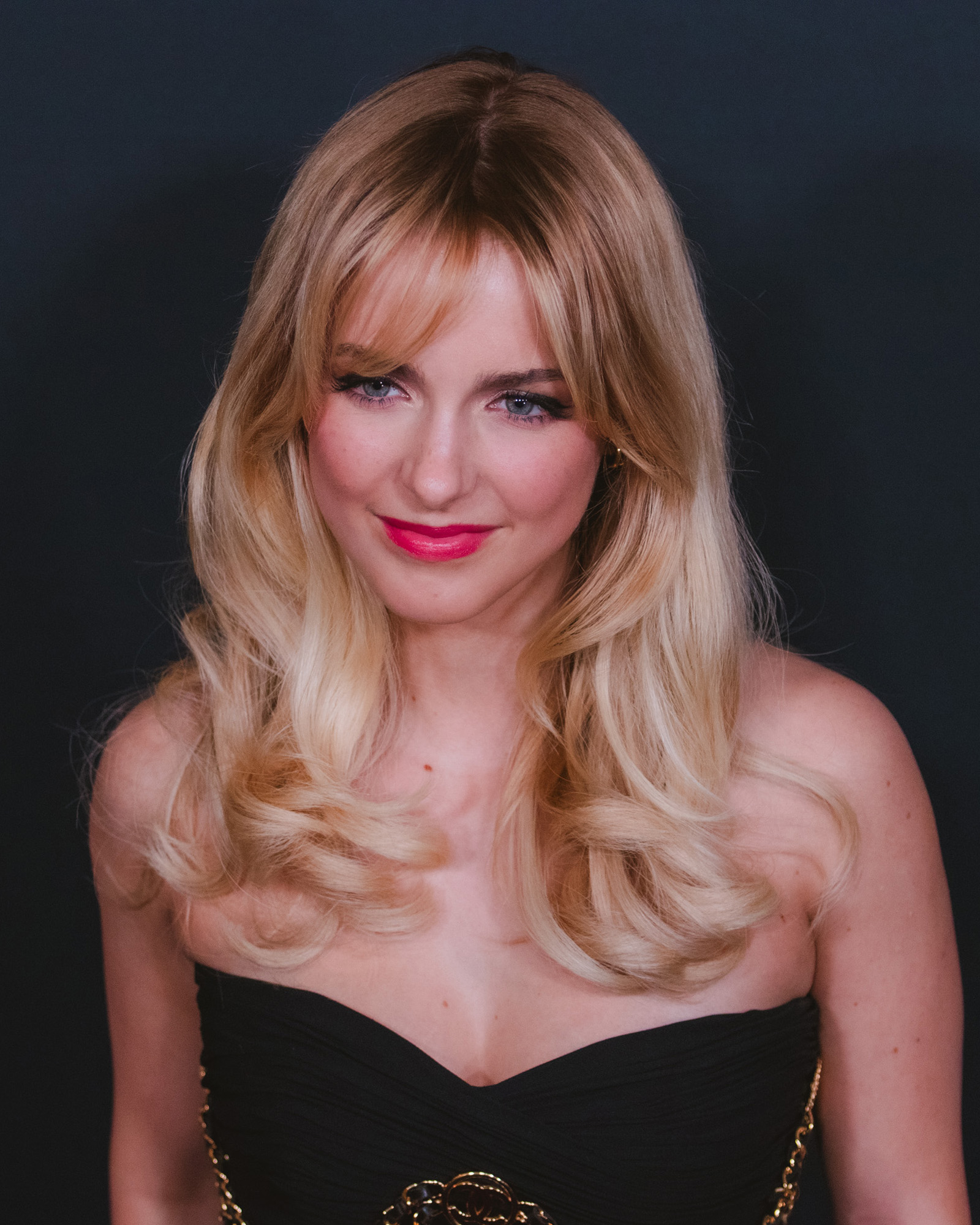
McKenna Grace voices as child in Scoob and reprise portrayal in upcoming Scooby-Doo: Origins

Daphne was portrayed by Sarah Michelle Gellar in the 2002 film Scooby-Doo and its 2004 sequel, Scooby-Doo 2: Monsters Unleashed, and also voiced Daphne in the animated series Robot Chicken. Her husband Freddie Prinze Jr. played Fred in the same films and Robot Chicken. Emily Tennant portrayed young Daphne in a flashback sequence in the second film. Daphne is portrayed by Kate Melton in the 2009 film Scooby-Doo! The Mystery Begins and its 2010 sequel Scooby-Doo! Curse of the Lake Monster. Sarah Jeffery portrays Daphne in the 2018 live-action film Daphne & Velma. Mckenna Grace will play Daphne in the upcoming Netflix series Scooby-Doo: Origins.

==== Additional live-action actors ====
- Rachel Kimsey (2001; Scooby-Doo! in Stagefright - Live on Stage)
- Selina MacDonald (2009; Scooby-Doo! and the Pirate Ghost - Live on Stage)
- Melissa Rapelje (2013; Scooby-Doo Live! Musical Mysteries)
- Julia Cave (2014; Scooby-Doo Live! The Mystery Of The Pyramid)
- Charlie Bull (2016; Scooby-Doo Live! Musical Mysteries)
- Samantha De Benedet (2020; Scooby-Doo! and the Lost City of Gold)

==== Parodies ====
- Carmen Llywelyn (2001; lookalike in Jay and Silent Bob Strike Back)
- Josephine Decker as Gwen (2012; Saturday Morning Mystery)
- Sabrina Carpenter (2024; Saturday Night Live)

== In other media ==
Daphne and Scooby are shown dancing from the end of The Scooby Doo Show episode "The Harum Scarum Sanitarium."

In the second issue of The Batman & Scooby-Doo Mysteries from 2022, the character temporarily took on the mantle of Batgirl.

Daphne appears in the Teen Titans Go! episode "Cartoon Feud", the Jellystone! episode "Frankenhooky", and Supernatural episode "Scoobynatural", along with parodies such as Family Guy and The Venture Bros.. Daphne also appears in the 2021 film Space Jam: A New Legacy, with her SCOOB design. She appears as an NPC in Lego Dimensions, and as a skin in Fortnite.

Daphne appears in many other Scooby-Doo videogames, books, comics, and other merchandise.

== Reception ==
Daphne Blake has been cited as an iconic character, noted for her fashion sense, as well as her later character development into a capable heroine.

Sarah Michelle Gellar won the Teen Choice Award for Choice Movie Actress (Comedy) in 2002 for her role as Daphne, and was nominated for the Choice Movie: Chemistry, alongside Freddie Prinze Jr.
