= Scooby-Doo and the Cyber Chase =

2001 direct-to-video film

- DVD cover
- Directed by: Jim Stenstrum
- Written by: Mark Turosz
- Based on: Characters by Hanna-Barbera Productions
- Produced by: Davis Doi
- Starring: Joe Alaskey; Bob Bergen; Grey DeLisle; Scott Innes; Tom Kane; Mikey Kelley; Gary Sturgis; B.J. Ward; Frank Welker
- Edited by: Joe Gall
- Music by: Louis Febre
- Production companies: Hanna-Barbera Cartoons; Warner Bros. Animation
- Distributed by: Warner Home Video
- Release date: October 9, 2001
- Running time: 75 minutes
- Country: United States
- Language: English

Scooby-Doo and the Cyber Chase is a 2001 American direct-to-video animated science fiction comedy film, and the fourth in a series of direct-to-video animated films based on the Scooby-Doo franchise. The film was produced by Hanna-Barbera Cartoons in collaboration with Warner Bros. Animation, and released on October 9, 2001.

The film was the final production released under the Hanna-Barbera name, following the studio's absorption into Warner Bros. Animation seven months prior. It is dedicated to co-founder William Hanna, who died on March 22, 2001, making this the last project he and Joseph Barbera executive produced together. The film also marked a significant transition for the voice cast: it introduced Grey DeLisle as the new voice of Daphne Blake. She replaced Mary Kay Bergman due to her death in November 1999. The film was the last to feature Scott Innes as the voice of both Scooby-Doo and Shaggy, as well as B. J. Ward as Velma. Director Jim Stenstrum and producer Davis Doi departed the series after its completion, citing "creative differences" with Warner Bros.

The film was the first in the series to utilize digital ink and paint and was the fourth and final to be animated by the Japanese studio Mook Animation. It was re-released on Blu-ray on April 5, 2011, alongside Aloha, Scooby-Doo!.

== Plot ==
Mystery Inc. visits their old friend and college student, Eric Staufer, who has invited them to see a prize-winning computer game he made based on their adventures and a high-tech laser, both of which he intends to enter at a campus science fair. Upon their arrival, they learn that a monstrous computer virus called the "Phantom Virus" materialized from Eric's game and attacked him before his teacher, Professor Kaufman, drove it off with a high-powered magnet and that it has been terrorizing the campus ever since. While investigating potential suspects Eric; Kaufman; Bill McLemore, Eric's best friend and baseball-loving programmer; and grumpy campus security guard, Officer Wembley, the gang encounters the Phantom Virus before someone uses Eric's laser to beam them all into his game, where the gang learns that they must complete every level by finding a box of Scooby Snax to get out of the game.

Following initial difficulties in the first three levels, the gang progresses quickly until they reach the final level, where they meet cyber-versions of themselves. After escaping from the Phantom Virus, the cyber-gang reveals that they know where to locate the final box of Scooby Snax and lead the original gang to an amusement park, where they battle real versions of monsters that Mystery Inc. has previously faced and unmasked as human criminals. Eventually, Scooby-Doo's cyber-double distracts the Phantom Virus so the original Scooby can grab the last box of Scooby Snax, deleting the Phantom Virus and returning the gang to the real world. Using baseball-related clues they found and phrases the Phantom Virus used during their adventure, they reveal Bill as its creator. Arrested by Wembley, Bill reveals that he was jealous that Eric's video game was chosen for the science fair over his even though he had been at the school two years longer, so he created the Phantom Virus to scare Eric away and claim the prize money for himself. Fearing that Mystery Inc. would discover he had created the virus, he beamed them into cyberspace in the hope that they would not survive. Afterwards, the gang and Eric go to a local restaurant to celebrate and reunite with the cyber-gang on Eric's laptop.

In a post-credits scene, the gang tells the audience what their favorite parts of the film were.

== Voice cast ==
- Scott Innes as Scooby-Doo, Shaggy Rogers and their Cyber Doubles
- Frank Welker as Fred Jones and his Cyber Double
- Grey DeLisle as Daphne Blake and her Cyber Double
- B.J. Ward as Velma Dinkley and her Cyber Double
- Joe Alaskey as Officer Wembley
- Bob Bergen as Eric Staufer
- Tom Kane as Professor Kaufman
- Mikey Kelley as Bill McLemore
- Gary Sturgis as The Phantom Virus

== Production ==
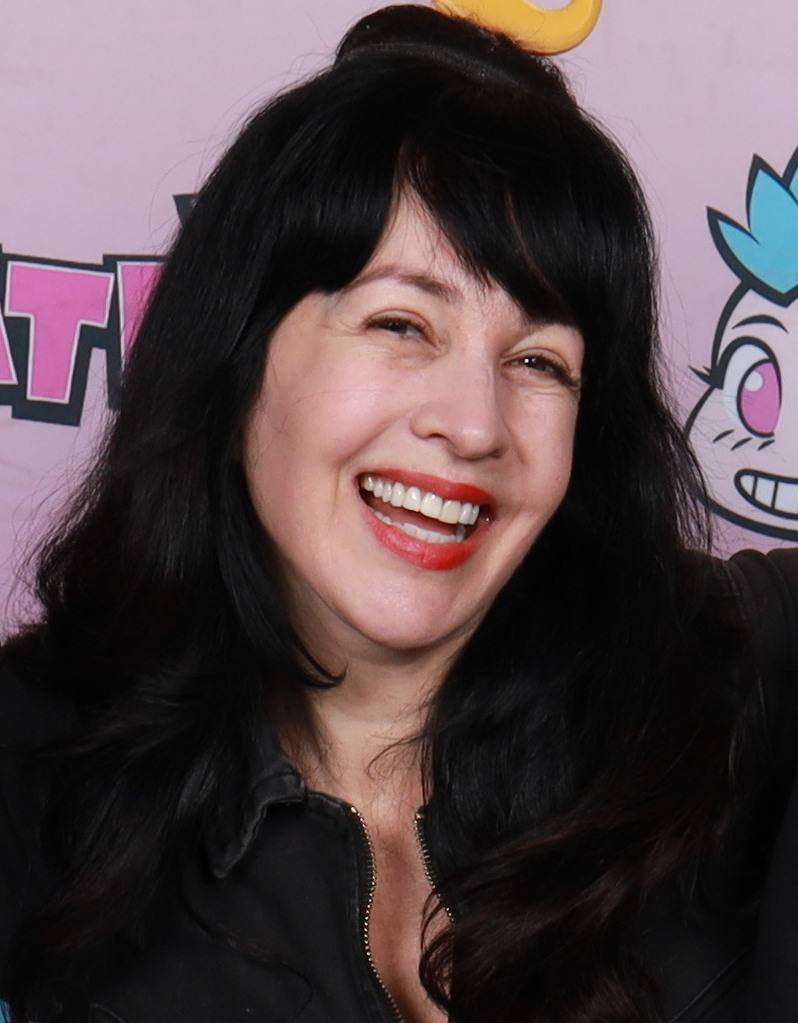
Scooby-Doo and the Cyber Chase marked the debut of Grey DeLisle as the voice of Daphne Blake, succeeding the role from Mary Kay Bergman following her death in 1999.

Scooby-Doo and the Cyber Chase is the fourth direct-to-video Scooby feature, and was the last for the original team that worked on the first four films. The team was led by Davis Doi, and included Glenn Leopold, Jim Stenstrum, and Lance Falk. Executives tasked Mark Turosz with writing the Cyber Chase script. The original team was critical of Turosz's script draft. In an interview, Lance Falk stated that he felt the plotline was poorly written and paced. Falk also expressed that the original script included scenes that were unnecessarily difficult to animate. As a result, the original team moved onto other projects after the film's completion. The next Scooby feature, Legend of the Vampire, was also written by Turosz.

Stenstrum initially suggested they explore using live-action actors for scenes set inside the video game, though the idea was quickly dropped. Out of the first four films, Cyber Chase features the largest array of storyboard artist credits, as the team were under significant time constraints and required additional help. Cyber Chase was also the last Scooby film to feature animation produced at Japanese studio Mook Animation.

Three songs were produced for the film, the first of which being the Scooby-Doo, Where Are You? theme performed by the B-52s and the other two being "Hello Cyberdream" and "Double Double Joint", both produced by Richard Lawrence Wolf.

== Reception ==
On Rotten Tomatoes the film holds an approval rating of 60% based on five reviews, with an average taking of 5.8/10. Common Sense Media gave the film a two out of five stars, saying, "Fine for fans of the franchise, but too much cartoon jeopardy for little kids."

== Home media ==
Scooby-Doo and the Cyber Chase was released October 9, 2001 for both VHS and DVD formats. Bonus features on the DVD include a ten-minute behind-the-scenes featurette titled "Making of Scooby-Doo and the Cyber Chase", which includes interviews with the film's voice actors; a promotional trailer for Scooby-Doo and the Cyber Chase; a rudimentary spot the difference game titled "Virtual Detective"; and a music video for "Scooby-Doo and Shaggy Love to Eat", composed by Nelson Blanchard and Scott Innes, and performed by Innes in-character as Shaggy and Scooby-Doo along with a chorus of children. This music video is also found in the bonus features of several other Scooby-Doo DVDs, including Scooby-Doo and the Ghoul School and Scooby-Doo! and the Reluctant Werewolf.

The film was re-released on Blu-ray on March 29, 2011. This was the first animated Scooby-Doo film to be produced in the high-definition format.

== Video game ==
A video game based on the film was released by THQ in 2001 for the PlayStation and Game Boy Advance. This is the first Scooby-Doo video game to be on a sixth-generation handheld.
