= Scooby-Doo! The Mystery Begins =

American TV film

- DVD cover
- Genre: Comedy horror
- Based on: Scooby-Doo by Joe Ruby and Ken Spears
- Written by: Daniel Altiere; Steven Altiere
- Directed by: Brian Levant
- Starring: Robbie Amell; Kate Melton; Hayley Kiyoko; Nick Palatas; Garry Chalk; Shawn Macdonald; Frank Welker
- Music by: David Newman
- Country of origin: United States
- Original language: English

Production
- Producers: Brian J. Gilbert; Brian Levant
- Cinematography: Jan Kiesser
- Editor: Eric Osmond
- Running time: 82 minutes
- Production company: Warner Bros. Pictures (Note: Released under the Warner Premiere label.)

Original release
- Network: Cartoon Network
- Release: September 13, 2009

Related
- Scooby-Doo! Curse of the Lake Monster (2010)

Scooby-Doo! The Mystery Begins is a 2009 American made-for-television comedy horror mystery film directed by Brian Levant. It is based on the cartoon series Scooby-Doo. The film reveals how the Mystery Inc. gang met and the events of their first case. The live-action cast features Nick Palatas as Shaggy, Robbie Amell as Fred, Hayley Kiyoko as Velma, and Kate Melton as Daphne. Scooby-Doo was created using computer-generated imagery and his voice is provided by Frank Welker, who was a cast member of the original animated series. A sequel, Scooby-Doo! Curse of the Lake Monster, was released in October 2010.

== Plot ==
In Coolsville, Ohio, a pet adoption fair is held. A talking Great Dane named Scooby-Doo is up for adoption, but nobody is interested in him. Later, on the way back to the pound, Scooby is accidentally left behind when the crate he is in falls off a truck. Seeking shelter from a rainstorm, he comes across a graveyard where he witnesses two ghosts rise from their graves. Scooby panics and runs away, ending up in the bedroom of Norville "Shaggy" Rogers, a clumsy and geeky outcast. The two quickly bond and Shaggy decides to adopt Scooby.

Later, Shaggy tries to smuggle Scooby onto the school bus, but a fight between Shaggy, Scooby, and a bully breaks out which causes the bus to crash into a flagpole, which falls on Vice Principal Grimes' car, damaging its windshield. Because of the fight on the bus and the damage to Grimes' car, Shaggy is sent to the library for detention (while Scooby is tethered outside), along with three others: Fred Jones, the quarterback of the football team; Velma Dinkley, a science nerd; and Daphne Blake, a wealthy drama club student. They bond somewhat over a shared interest in mysteries, but quickly get on each other's nerves. The ghosts suddenly appear and chase them to the gym where a pep rally is taking place. A masked figure in a cloak known as the Specter appears, demanding everyone to leave. The stamp-collecting Principal Deedle decides to close the school, but Grimes deems it a prank and suspends the quartet as he refuses to believe that there are ghosts in the school.

The gang try to clear their names by investigating the ghosts at it, but Shaggy and Scooby end up being locked in the cafeteria freezers. They are freed the next morning by Grimes, who expels them from the school, and threatens to have them arrested for trespassing if they set foot on school property again. Assuming the school librarian and janitor might be trying to close the school after Shaggy remembered overhearing them complaining about it, they use Daphne's knowledge of theatrical costuming to sneak into the school, but they are exonerated when Velma discovers a spell book was recently checked out by Grimes, making them think Grimes is their prime suspect. Searching at night at Grimes' house, they learn that the school grounds were once used by Coolsville Academy, a prep school that was destroyed during a flood the same day they intended to bury a time capsule of the school's history; the gang concludes the ghosts are trying to get their school shut down so they can search for the time capsule unimpeded. The ghosts attack again, and the teens are knocked out. The Specter, keeping Scooby and Grimes as prisoners, forces the gang to search underground for the time capsule. Unable to find the capsule, they trick the Specter into coming down to carry the capsule out of the hole, but the plan backfires when they try to lock him up in a flooded room, and the Specter acquires the capsule.

Stealing the capsule back, the gang uses the spell book to banish the ghosts. Scooby breaks free of his restraints and arrives just in time to subdue the Specter, who is soon revealed to be Deedle. It is then revealed that a stamp misprint was hidden within the time capsule, something that would have been worth a fortune. Determined to obtain the misprint, Deedle used the spell book to summon the ghosts to have the school evacuated so he can accomplish his goal.

After Deedle is arrested for his crimes, the group is re-instated to Coolsville High and publicly congratulated by Grimes, who becomes the new principal. He apologizes to them for not believing them before announcing the official burial of the time capsule. Just as they begin digging, Shaggy accidentally throws his shovel, which lands on Grimes' car, once again damaging its windshield. Instead of giving him another detention, Grimes forgives Shaggy, stating that accidents happen. The group decide to stay together and solve mysteries, and they head off to "investigate some strange goings-on at the Coolsville museum", a reference to the first episode of Scooby-Doo, Where Are You! and their first villain, the Black Knight Ghost.

== Cast ==
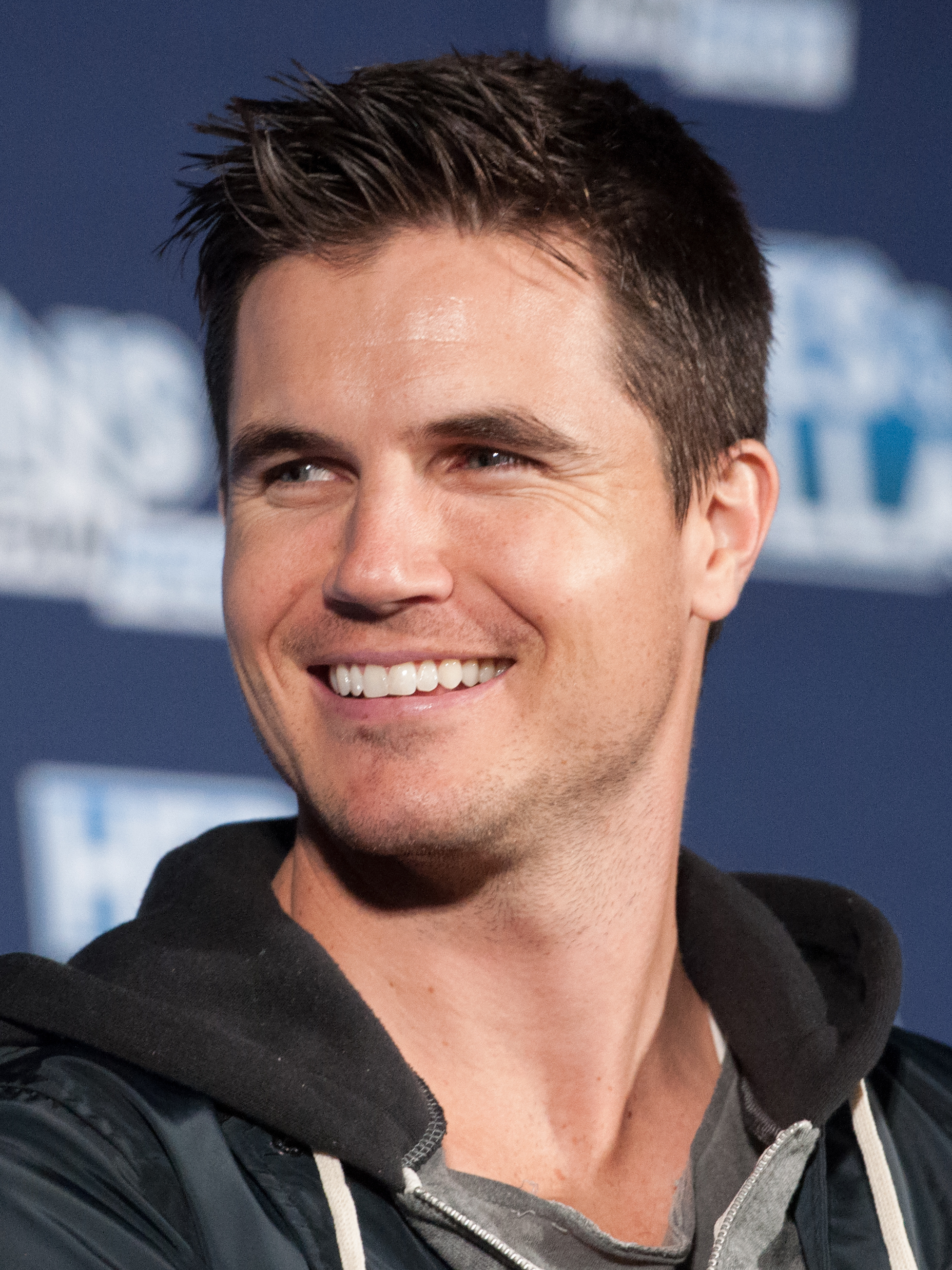
Robbie Amell
(Fred Jones)

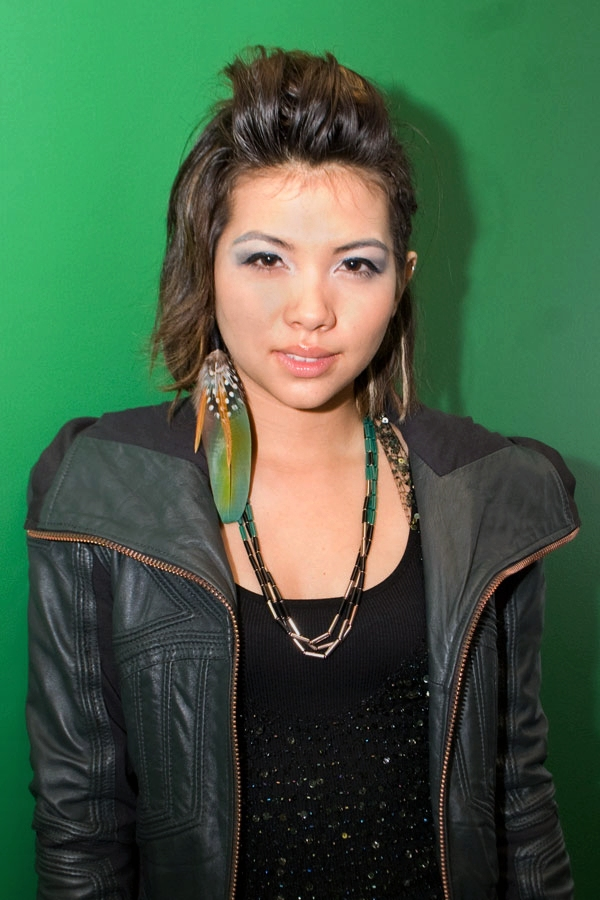
Hayley Kiyoko
(Velma Dinkley)

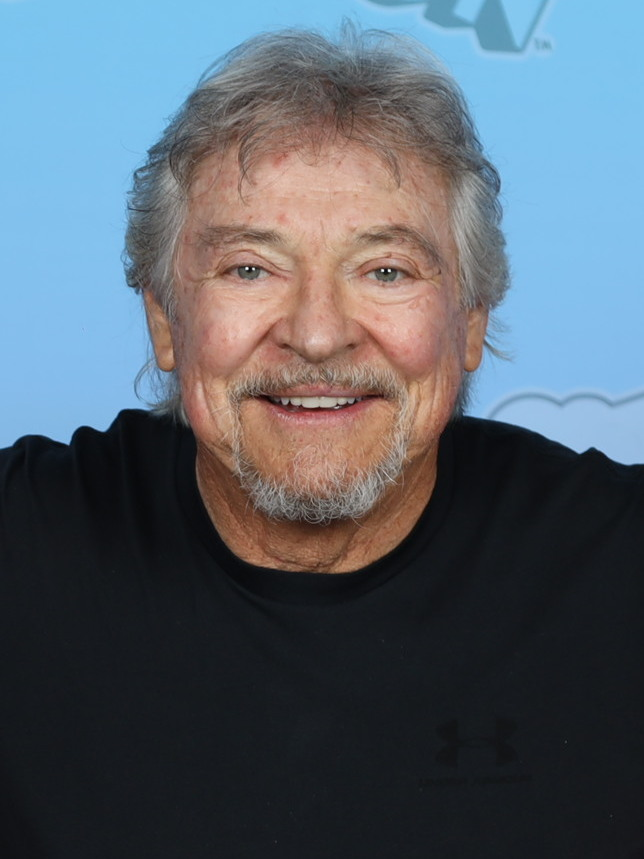
Frank Welker
(Scooby-Doo)

- Kate Melton as Daphne Blake
- Hayley Kiyoko as Velma Dinkley
- Robbie Amell as Fred Jones
- Nick Palatas as Shaggy Rogers
- Frank Welker as the voice of Scooby-Doo
- Shawn Macdonald as Principal Deedle/Dark Specter
- Garry Chalk as Vice Principal Grimes
- Leah James as Prudence Prufrock
- Brian Sutton as Ezekiel Gallows
- C. Ernst Harth as Otis the Janitor
- Lorena Gale as Librarian

== Production ==
=== Filming ===
Filming took place in Vancouver, British Columbia, Canada, including Templeton Secondary School from August 4, 2008.

== Music ==
The music is scored by David Newman, who had previously scored the theatrical films Scooby-Doo (2002) and Scooby-Doo 2: Monsters Unleashed (2004), and previously worked with director Brian Levant on his films. The band Anarbor recorded the What's New, Scooby-Doo? theme, as well as the song and music video "You and I" for the film's soundtrack.

== Release ==
=== Home media ===
Scooby-Doo! The Mystery Begins aired on Cartoon Network on September 13, 2009. Warner Home Video released it on DVD and Blu-ray on September 22, 2009.

== Reception ==
=== Critical response ===
Scooby-Doo! The Mystery Begins was the most-watched telecast in Cartoon Network history. It had 6.1 million viewers, outdistancing the previous high of 3.9 million viewers that tuned into the premiere of the animated series Star Wars: The Clone Wars.

Variety called it a "surprisingly effective origin story", and the Los Angeles Times wrote that it is "a first-rate family film and an excellent, faithful take on Scooby-Doo rounded out by a surprising amount of human feeling".

== Sequel ==
Due to the success of Scooby-Doo! The Mystery Begins, a sequel went into development in October 2009. Titled Scooby-Doo! Curse of the Lake Monster, principal photography commenced on March 15, 2010, in various locations around Southern California. The sequel aired on October 16, 2010, and was released on DVD in 2011.
