= Shaggy Rogers =

Fictional character from Scooby-Doo

Norville "Shaggy" Rogers
- Scooby-Doo character
- First appearance: "What a Night for a Knight"; Scooby-Doo, Where Are You!; September 13, 1969
- Created by: Joe Ruby; Ken Spears
- Designed by: Iwao Takamoto
- Voiced by: Casey Kasem (1969–1997, 2002–2009); Billy West (1998); Scott Innes (1998–2009, 2017–2020); Matthew Lillard (2004, 2010–present); Scott Menville (2006–2008); Will Forte (2020); Iain Armitage (young; 2020–2022); Sam Richardson (Velma; 2023–2024); (see below)
- Portrayed by: Matthew Lillard (2002–2004); Cascy Beddow (young; 2004); Nick Palatas (2009–2010); (see below)

In-universe information
- Full name: Norville Rogers
- Gender: Male
- Family: Colton Rogers (father); Paula Rogers (mother); Gaggy Rogers (uncle); Maggie Rogers (sister)
- Significant others: Googie (Scooby-Doo! and the Reluctant Werewolf); Crystal (Scooby-Doo and the Alien Invaders); Mary Jane (2002 film); Madelyn Dinkley (Scooby-Doo! Abracadabra-Doo); Velma Dinkley (Shaggy & Scooby-Doo Get a Clue!, Scooby-Doo: Mystery Incorporated, Scooby-Doo! Curse of the Lake Monster, Scooby Apocalypse)

Norville "Shaggy" Rogers is a fictional cartoon character and one of the main characters in the Scooby-Doo franchise. He is characterized as an amateur detective, and the long-time best friend of his dog, Scooby-Doo.

The four teenage lead characters of Scooby-Doo were inspired by four of the main characters from the 1959–1963 American sitcom The Many Loves of Dobie Gillis, with Shaggy having been derived from the character Maynard G. Krebs, as played by Bob Denver. Maynard's beatnik-style goatee, general appearance, and use of the word "like" all found their way into the character of Shaggy, with the base personality of the character updated to make him a hippie rather than a beatnik.

Shaggy is typically depicted as having a large appetite and a love for food. He and Scooby justify their hunger by insisting that "Being in a constant state of terror makes us constantly hungry!" in Scooby-Doo on Zombie Island. Shaggy supposedly maintains a slender physique because of his high metabolism and habitual vegetarianism. Various episodes have mentioned that he was a track and field athlete and a gymnast in his younger years, explaining how he evades villains by simply outrunning them.

== Character description ==
Shaggy has a characteristic speech pattern marked by his frequent use of the filler word "like" and a pubescent voice that often cracks. His catchphrase is the nonsense word "Zoinks!", used to express surprise or alarm. In the show, he is the only protagonist with facial hair, which consists of a rough goatee. His signature attire consists of a baggy green V-neck T-shirt, loose maroon or brown bell-bottom pants, and black shoes. In The 13 Ghosts of Scooby-Doo and early made-for-TV films, he wears a red V-neck and blue jeans.

Like his dog Scooby, Shaggy is characterized as being able to be bribed with Scooby Snacks due to his large appetite and love for food. Shaggy's favorite meal is an "extra cheese pizza with pickles", as revealed in the TV film Scooby-Doo! Abracadabra-Doo. In Scooby-Doo! and the Monster of Mexico, it is revealed by Fred that the reason Shaggy eats so much (while maintaining his slender physique) is his "high metabolism". However, in Scooby-Doo: Behind the Scenes, it is stated by Fred that the real reason Shaggy is so skinny is because he is a vegetarian (a reference to Casey Kasem's veganism). The episode "A Clue for Scooby-Doo" from his debut series Scooby-Doo, Where Are You! revealed that his taste for unlikely foods (such as chocolate-covered hot dogs and liverwurst "a la mode") is a consequence of a young Shaggy receiving a garbage disposal unit for his first toy.

In the episode "Bedlam in the Big Top", he says he is a track runner, and in the pilot episode "What a Night for a Knight" Daphne states that he is the best gymnast in their school – both of which explain his uncanny skills in quickly evading villains. He has been shown, in some instances, to be able to run even faster than Scooby, even when the dog is running on all fours. Shaggy is capable of impressive feats of athleticism when he is scared; however, these abilities are usually only used for comedy, with Shaggy only being capable of such feats when panicked. For example, after being scared in Scooby-Doo! Camp Scare, he shakes the iron bars of an old-fashioned jail cell so hard that they collapse.

Normally, Shaggy becomes extremely scared when faced with monsters or other frightening situations, usually displaying cowardice to a much greater degree than any other character except for Scooby. This was explained in the Legend of the Phantosaur as a possible type of panic disorder. However, on occasion, he shows courage when his friends are in serious danger.

In the earliest produced episodes, Shaggy was actually a bit intelligent and at times was capable of solving mysteries and even capturing the villains. For example in the episode "A Clue for Scooby-Doo", he correctly deduced that the ghost of Captain Cutler was actually Cutler himself by using some seaweed to imitate his beard to prove his point. In the episode "Never Ape an Ape Man", he spotted the Ape-Man without his mask and tricked him into having his picture taken with a camera. Also, in the episode "Bedlam in the Big Top", Shaggy concocted a brilliant plan to capture the Ghost Clown by way of tricking him into hypnotizing himself by holding up mirrors.

== Development ==
The four teenage lead characters of Scooby-Doo were inspired by four of the main characters from the 1959–1963 American sitcom The Many Loves of Dobie Gillis, with Shaggy having been derived from the character Maynard G. Krebs, as played by Bob Denver. Maynard's beatnik-style goatee, general appearance, and use of the word "like" all found their way into the character of Shaggy, with the base personality of the character updated to make him a hippie rather than a beatnik.

Casey Kasem, the first voice actor for Shaggy, said that he originally felt uncomfortable after being assigned to Shaggy. Kasem stated that while he was "hip to what hippies were about", he had never before portrayed a hippie character. Kasem had wanted to voice act for Fred Jones, and Frank Welker had wanted to voice act for Shaggy. Instead, the CBS network assigned Kasem to Shaggy and Welker to Fred. Unsure what the voice of a hippie would sound like, Kasem based his vocal style and mannerisms for Shaggy on those of Dick Crenna's character Walter Denton from the radio/television sitcom Our Miss Brooks.

Kasem stated that as he continued to voice Shaggy, the character evolved. Kasem said that the "voice dynamics" improved and that his laughs increasingly gained quality. He added that Shaggy in 2002 is "more frightened today than he was at the beginning." Kasem convinced the producers that Shaggy should be a vegetarian, like himself, in 2002.

== Performers ==
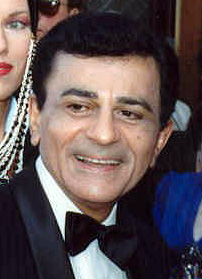
Casey Kasem (pictured in 1989), Shaggy's original voice actor

Matthew Lillard, seen here in character in the 2002 film, portrayed Shaggy in two films and has provided Shaggy's voice since 2010.

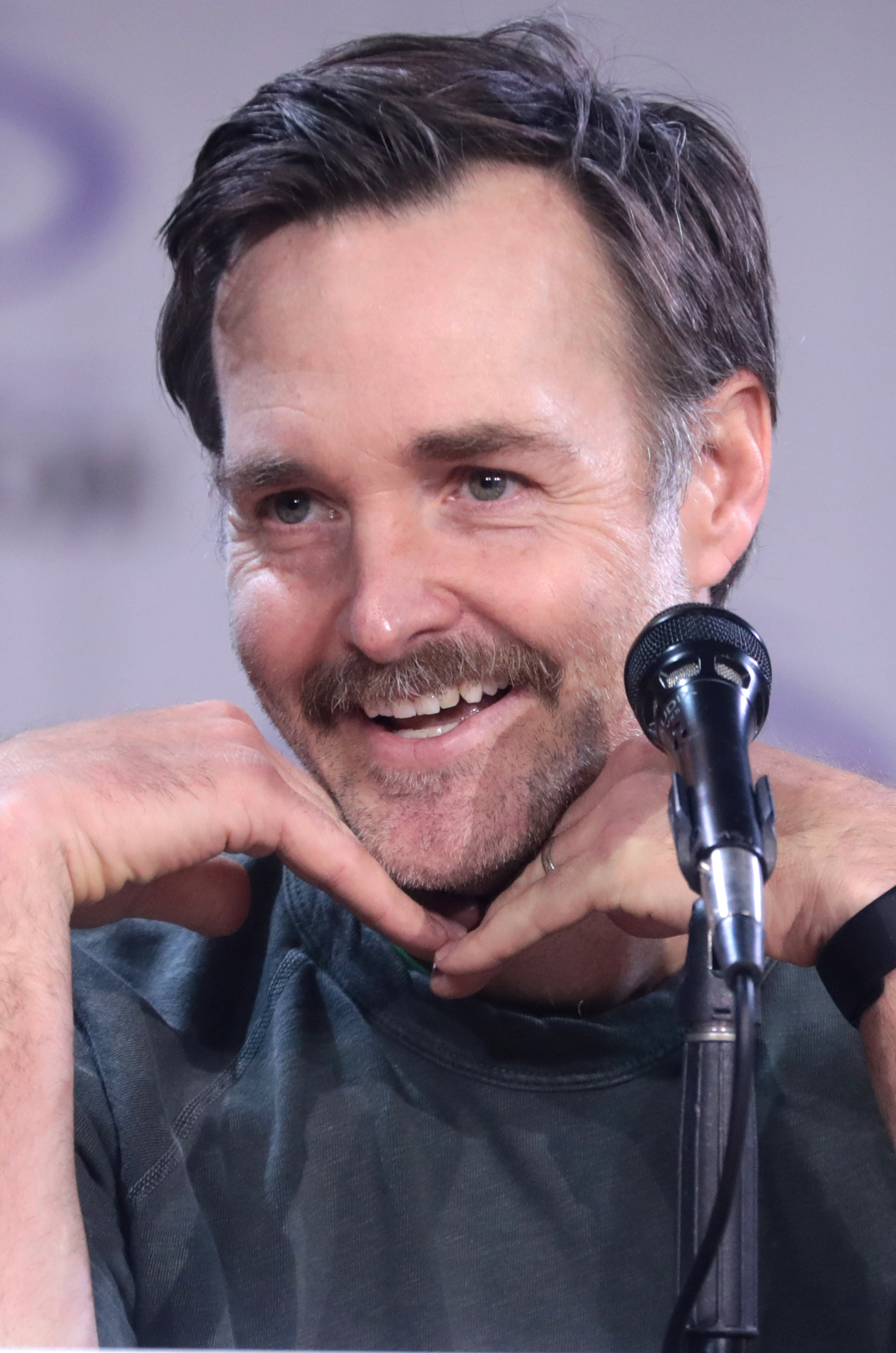
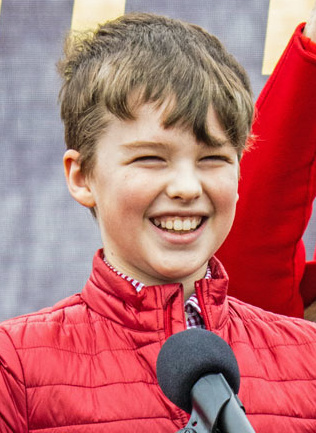
Will Forte (left) and Iain Armitage voice Shaggy Rogers in Scoob!.

Radio disc-jockey and actor Casey Kasem created Shaggy's voice. Kasem voiced Shaggy for 28 years, from Scooby-Doo, Where Are You! in 1969 until the Johnny Bravo crossover episode "Bravo Dooby-Doo" in 1997. Starting with What's New, Scooby-Doo? in 2002 and Looney Tunes: Back in Action in 2003, Kasem resumed the role and continued to do so until his retirement in 2009. Billy West voiced the character in the film Scooby-Doo on Zombie Island (1998). Scott Innes (who has also voiced Scooby and Scrappy-Doo) voiced Shaggy in the 1999–2001 direct-to-video films, and in video games until 2009. Innes reprised Shaggy in Harvey Birdman, Attorney at Law and a DirecTV commercial featuring the Scooby gang in 2008. Scott Menville voiced Shaggy in Shaggy & Scooby-Doo Get a Clue!. Upon Casey Kasem's official retirement in 2009, Matthew Lillard (who played Shaggy in the 2002 and 2004 live-action films) took over as the main voice of Shaggy. Lillard also played Shaggy in Robot Chicken and Mad. Nick Palatas played Shaggy in the 2009 and 2010 live-action films. Will Forte voiced the character for the 2020 animated film Scoob! while Iain Armitage voices the child version of Shaggy. An alternative version of Shaggy, an African American school newspaper reporter referred to exclusively as Norville, appears in Velma.

Shaggy has been voiced by:

- Casey Kasem (1969–1997, 2002–2009, Scooby-Doo and the Spooky Swamp)
- Duncan Robertson (1977; Peter Pan Records read-along audio books)
- Keith Scott (1981; Pauls commercial)
- Jeff Bergman (1990s, 2010; Cartoon Network bumpers, Boomerang UK bumper)
- Tom Kenny (1996; Burger King commercial)
- Billy West (1998; Scooby-Doo on Zombie Island)
- Scott Innes (1998–2009, 2017–2020; Scooby Doo Behind The Scenes, Scooby-Doo! and the Witch's Ghost, The Scooby-Doo Project, Scooby-Doo and the Alien Invaders, Scooby-Doo and the Cyber Chase, Harvey Birdman, Attorney at Law, Scooby-Doo! Playmobil Mini Mysteries, video games, commercials, theme parks)
- Marc Silk (1998, 2004–2009, 2011, 2013, since 2015; Radio 1 Breakfast, Cartoon Network UK and Ireland bumpers, Boomerang UK and Ireland bumpers, CITV UK and Ireland bumpers, Adidas commercial, Scooby-Doo! and the Pirate Ghost - Live on Stage commercial, Scooby-Doo! Mystery Mansion with Goo Turret commercial, Scooby-Doo! Mystery Mates Mansion Playset and Figures commercial, Lego Scooby-Doo! commercial, Scooby-Doo! Rumble & Roll Mystery Machine commercial)
- Kenny James (2001; phone message)
- Jeff Bennett (2002; Kids' WB bumpers)
- Matt Danner (2003–2009; additional lines, songs, commercials, DVD extras)
- James Arnold Taylor (2004; additional lines in Scooby-Doo 2: Monsters Unleashed)
- Matthew Lillard (2002–2007, since 2010; Scooby-Doo 2: Monsters Unleashed: The Video Game, Robot Chicken, Mad, Teen Titans Go!, Supernatural)
- Scott Menville (2006–2008; Shaggy & Scooby-Doo Get a Clue!)
- Tony Daniels (2008; Yin Yang Yo!)
- Seth Green (2008; Robot Chicken)
- Kevin Shinick (2012; Mad)
- Will Forte (2020; Scoob!)
- Iain Armitage (2020, 2022; Scoob!, Scoob! Holiday Haunt (both as a child))
- Sam Richardson (Velma)

And portrayed by:

- Bjorn Thorstad (2001; Scooby-Doo! in Stagefright - Live on Stage)
- Matthew Lillard (2002–2004; Scooby-Doo, Scooby-Doo 2: Monsters Unleashed)
- Cascy Beddow (2004; Scooby-Doo 2: Monsters Unleashed (younger))
- Nazanin Afshin-Jam (2004; Scooby-Doo 2: Monsters Unleashed (as Shaggy Chick; body))
- Richard Lynson (2005; Scooby-Doo! in Stagefright - Live on Stage)
- Matthew Bloxham (2009; Scooby-Doo! and the Pirate Ghost - Live on Stage)
- Nick Palatas (2009–2010; Scooby-Doo! The Mystery Begins, Scooby-Doo! Curse of the Lake Monster)
- Garrett Dill (2013; Scooby-Doo Live! Musical Mysteries)
- Danny Stokes (2014; Scooby-Doo Live! The Mystery of the Pyramid)
- Charlie Haskins (2016; Scooby-Doo Live! Musical Mysteries)
- Bryan Kling (2020; Scooby-Doo! and the Lost City of Gold)
- Mikey Day (2024; Saturday Night Live)

== Background ==
In most cases, Shaggy is from the fictional town of Coolsville, Ohio. When he is old enough to go to school, he adopts Scooby-Doo from the Knittingham Puppy Farm. Later on, he meets Fred Jones, Daphne Blake, and Velma Dinkley. They become friends and decide to form Mystery Incorporated. According to Scooby-Doo: Behind the Scenes, Shaggy is the one who bought the Mystery Machine and gave it its paint job.

According to Scooby-Doo: Behind the Scenes, Shaggy's old nickname was Buzz (apparently for his buzz cut), until his tenth birthday. Fred says that, contrary to what people believe, Shaggy is not skinny because Scooby is always stealing his food, but rather because he is a vegetarian. But as healthy as Shaggy tries to stay, he has battled unhealthy habits such as the time he developed an addiction for Scooby Snacks for a few months. At one point, Velma calculated that he had eaten exactly 45% of his body weight. This led to him starting a new hobby: collecting decorator belt buckles. Shaggy claims to have the largest collection of decorator belt buckles in the world and currently owns 653. His favorite one reads, "WHEN DO WE EAT?" He also states that he wears a different belt buckle for every mystery if one pays attention, the joke being that his baggy shirt always hides them. Shaggy was the one who bought the Mystery Machine and gave it its iconic paint job after Fred's idea of painting it red was denied.

In Scooby-Doo! Mystery Incorporated, he is from Crystal Cove along with the other members of Mystery Incorporated. His parents' names are Colton and Paula Rogers and appear to be quite well off, living in a mansion. He dates Velma for a short period during the first season.

== Other appearances ==
=== Television series ===
Shaggy and Scooby-Doo made a non-speaking cameo in Teen Titans Go! episode entitled "I See You" when Cyborg and Beast Boy were rapping. Shaggy later appears in the crossover episode "Cartoon Feud" along with The Scooby Gang, where Control Freak forces them to compete in Family Feud with Matthew Lillard reprising the role of Shaggy.

Shaggy, along with the other 4 members of Mystery Inc., made an appearance throughout the 16th episode of the 13th season of Supernatural entitled "Scoobynatural" when the two lead protagonists, Sam Winchester and his brother Dean Winchester, and their accomplice, Castiel, are transported into an episode of Scooby Doo; the Supernatural episode itself is a crossover between the two franchises. Matthew Lillard voices Shaggy in the episode.

Shaggy and the Mystery Inc. Gang made appearance in Jellystone! in the episode "Frankenhooky" where they stop The Ghost Chasers from attacking Yogi Bear and Boo-Boo at an abandoned cheese theme park. Matthew Lillard briefly reprising the role of Shaggy.

=== Films ===
Shaggy and Scooby make a cameo appearance in the 2003 live-action/animated film Looney Tunes: Back in Action, where Shaggy berates Matthew Lillard over his portrayal of Shaggy in the 2002 live-action film and threatens to "come after" him if he screws up in the sequel.

Shaggy also appears in the 2021 film Space Jam: A New Legacy. His design is the same from the 2020 film, Scoob!

Shaggy made a brief appearance in Mortal Kombat Legends: Battle of the Realms.

=== Video games ===
The internet meme "Ultra Instinct Shaggy" portrays Shaggy as a powerful fighter akin to a character from a shōnen manga. The playable depiction of Shaggy in MultiVersus is based on this meme

Outside of Scooby-Doo video games, Shaggy appears as a playable character, along with Scooby, in the crossover video game Lego Dimensions. Shaggy's character includes the Mystery Machine. Matthew Lillard reprises his role for the game. Lillard also reprises his role in the platform fighting game MultiVersus, in which Shaggy is a playable character. Shaggy appears in Fortnite during 2025's Fortnitemares.

=== Internet memes ===
In 2017, YouTube user Midya uploaded a video titled "Ultra Instinct Shaggy". The video featured a clip from Scooby-Doo! Legend of the Phantosaur in which a hypnotized Shaggy fights off a gang of bikers, set to the song "Kyūkyoku no Battle" from the Dragon Ball Super soundtrack. The video became a popular internet meme, inspiring fan art of Shaggy as a powerful warrior akin to a Dragon Ball character. Another version of the meme involved behind-the-scenes interviews from the 2002 Scooby-Doo film with fake subtitles, in which the film's cast would refer to "Shaggy" as a real person and attest to his immense, frightening power. The meme also led to a Change.org petition to add Shaggy as a DLC character in Mortal Kombat 11, which caught the attention of both Mortal Kombat series co-creator Ed Boon and Matthew Lillard. Despite not appearing in the game, Shaggy would make a cameo appearance in the Warner Bros. Animation vanity card before the animated film Mortal Kombat Legends: Battle of the Realms. Shaggy's portrayal in the crossover fighting game MultiVersus is based on the "Ultra Instinct Shaggy" meme.

== Marijuana usage ==
Some viewers of the original Scooby-Doo believed that Shaggy smoked marijuana due to his hippie behavior and constant hunger. In a Newsweek article, Casey Kasem was asked if he had ever observed that subtext in the series, and Kasem responded that "there wasn't anything like that at all", explaining, "[I] guess it's because, I don't know, it was a wholesome show from beginning to end." Kasem was not aware of the fan viewpoint until the interviewer brought it up. The makers of the 2002 Scooby-Doo film shot several scenes referencing Shaggy's supposed drug use, but few of those scenes were included in the final film. One scene which made it into the film has a minor character introduce herself to Shaggy as "Mary Jane" (a slang term for marijuana), and he responds, "Like, that is my favorite name." Matthew Lillard, the current voice of Shaggy, does not think he smokes marijuana: "He just seems like that. He acts a little goofy and high, he's lovable and scared – and just happens to have the munchies."

In an online radio interview with host Stu Shostak, series creators Joe Ruby and Ken Spears recalled that they never intended for Shaggy to be a marijuana smoker, and "took umbrage" at the jokes in the 2002 film. In reference to this urban legend, the 2002 first season Harvey Birdman, Attorney at Law episode "Shaggy Busted" revolves around Shaggy and Scooby-Doo being mistaken for recreational drug users and arrested while they are en-route to the rest of the gang, with Fred Jones hiring Harvey Birdman to successfully defend the duo, with "the [opposing] prosecutor bring[ing] up questionable clips from old Scooby-Doo episodes that show the characters running through smoky rooms and pausing mid-blink so it looks like their eyelids are drooping" ahead of their innocence being proven.

In Velma, "Norville Rogers" is introduced in the first season as Velma's half-African American best friend who frequently brings up how much he hates drugs.
