= Nick Palatas =

American actor and voice actor

- Born: Nicholas Edward Palatas; January 22, 1988 (age 38); Bethesda, Maryland, U.S.
- Occupation: Actor
- Years active: 2007–2013, 2023–present
- Spouses: Marissa Denig (m. 2012; div. 2019) Mary Armstrong (m. 2025)
- Children: 1
- Relatives: Cameron Palatas (brother)

Nicholas Edward Palatas (born January 22, 1988) is an American actor. Palatas has appeared in short films including The Erogenous Zone, Love, and Air We Breathe and has been in several ads. In 2009, he played Norville "Shaggy" Rogers in the film Scooby-Doo! The Mystery Begins and reprised the role in Scooby-Doo! Curse of the Lake Monster which aired in October 2010. A newcomer to the Scooby-Doo series, Palatas took over for Matthew Lillard. Palatas is of Slovak, English and German descent.

== Personal life ==
Palatas married his wife Marissa Denig in 2012. Denig filled for divorce from Palatas in 2017; the divorce was finalized in 2019. Palatas began dating Mary Armstrong of Columbus, Ohio in 2024. The couple married at St. John Lutheran Church in Dublin, Ohio in January 2025.

== Filmography ==
Year	Film	Role	Notes
2007	The Erogenous Zone	Flip Fowler	Short Film
2008	Love	School Boy 1	Short Film
2009	Scooby-Doo! The Mystery Begins	Norville "Shaggy" Rogers	TV movie
2009	The Scooby-Doo Mystery Inc. Personality Quiz	Norville "Shaggy" Rogers	Video Short
2009	Scooby-Doo: The Coolsville High Video Yearbook	Norville "Shaggy" Rogers	Video Short
2010	Scooby-Doo! Curse of the Lake Monster	Norville "Shaggy" Rogers	TV movie
2010	Scooby-Doo: The Whole World Loves You!	Norville "Shaggy" Rogers	Video Short
2010	True Jackson, VP	Skeet	TV series
2010	Destroy Build Destroy	Himself	TV series
2011	Air We Breathe	Dylan Avery	Short Film
2011	Searching For Phantosaurs	Himself	Video Short
2011	Scooby-Doo: Rock, Rap and Rollerskates	Himself	Video Short
2011	Jeepers! Jinkies! Zoinks! A Tribute to the Classic Gags of Scooby-Doo!	Himself	Video Short
2013	School of Thrones	Robb Stark	Web Series
2025	White Ladybug	The Agent	Independent Film

== Theater ==
2023 : Ken Ludwig's Sherwood 2024 : See No Evil by Cory Skurdal
