= Scooby-Doo! Curse of the Lake Monster =

2010 mystery film

- Promotional release poster
- Genre: Comedy horror
- Based on: Scooby-Doo by Joe Ruby and Ken Spears
- Written by: Daniel Altiere; Steven Altiere
- Directed by: Brian Levant
- Starring: Robbie Amell; Kate Melton; Hayley Kiyoko; Nick Palatas; Frank Welker
- Music by: David Newman
- Country of origin: United States
- Original language: English

Production
- Producers: Brian Gilbert; Brian Levant
- Cinematography: Dean Cundey
- Editor: Eric Osmond
- Running time: 82 minutes
- Production companies: Warner Bros. Pictures (Note: Released under the Warner Premiere label.); Atlas Entertainment; Telvan Productions; Nine/8 Entertainment

Original release
- Network: Cartoon Network
- Release: October 16, 2010

Related
- Scooby-Doo! The Mystery Begins (2009)

Scooby-Doo! Curse of the Lake Monster is a 2010 American made-for-television comedy horror mystery film directed by Brian Levant for Cartoon Network and based on the Saturday morning cartoon series Scooby-Doo by Hanna-Barbera. It is a sequel to the 2009 film Scooby-Doo! The Mystery Begins. Robbie Amell, Hayley Kiyoko, Kate Melton, Nick Palatas, and Frank Welker cast reprise their roles. The film was shot in Santa Clarita, California, and Sherwood Country Club in Thousand Oaks, California, and premiered on October 16, 2010.

== Plot ==
As summer vacation begins, the group heads to meet with Daphne's uncle, Thornton "Thorny" Blake V, who has given them summer jobs at his country club in Erie Point in order to pay back damages from a previous mystery. After a frog monster attacks on the night of the club's opening party, they investigate lighthouse keeper Elmer Uggins, the only person who has taken a picture of the lake monster. He tells them the story of the lake monster: when people first settled in Erie Point, a witch named Wanda Grubwort, who was living there, told them to leave, but they ignored her warning. To get revenge on them for trespassing on her home, she used her magic staff, which used moonstones as the source of its power, to transform a frog into a monster that attacked the villagers before she was burned at the stake as punishment for her crimes.

The next day, Velma shows the group security footage of the lake monster meeting a mysteriously cloaked figure on the beach. Although they attempt to analyze the footage to see the figure's face, Velma accidentally spills green tea on the computer, destroying the footage. The situation is complicated by friction between Fred and Daphne, whose relationship has become strained due to them socializing with others and Shaggy's feelings for Velma causing him to alienate Scooby.

The next morning, they find Velma unconscious on the beach and Shaggy notices warts on her hand, which she dismisses. After they inform her of the latest monster attack, Daphne says that she saw purple paint on the figure's cloak and suggests that they check out a boat that they saw on their way to Erie Point. Shaggy asks Velma out on a date, and things go well until he strikes a match to light candles, which frightens her. Scooby attempts to ruin the date, causing Shaggy to drop a moonstone that he planned to give to Velma as a surprise. As Fred and Daphne head to see the boat, the monster locks them in a flooding room, but they escape.

The group visits the home of Hilda Trowburg, Wanda's descendant, and see the figure through the windows, who they discover to be Velma. However, she claims to not be Velma and attacks them, knocking them unconscious. After they awaken, Trowburg tells them that Wanda's spirit has possessed Velma and they realize that their infighting caused them to miss the signs that Velma was possessed - the warts on her body, her fear of fire and love of moonstones, and how she spilled tea to hide her identity. At Trowburg's suggestion, they pursue Velma to the underwater caves, where she transforms a trio of frogs into monsters that attack them.

As the monsters corner Fred and Daphne, Shaggy tries to get through to Velma by singing her favorite song, and Velma breaks free from Wanda's possession. Wanda attempts to reclaim her staff, but Scooby arrives and destroys it, destroying Wanda and returning the monsters to normal. Shaggy confesses to Velma and they kiss, but realize that they had no romantic feelings and, along with Fred and Daphne, agree that they are better off as friends, allowing Shaggy to reconcile with Scooby. Thornton thanks the group for saving his county club and promises to get them a lawyer so they can avoid future legal problems, prompting Daphne to name the group Mystery Inc.

== Cast ==
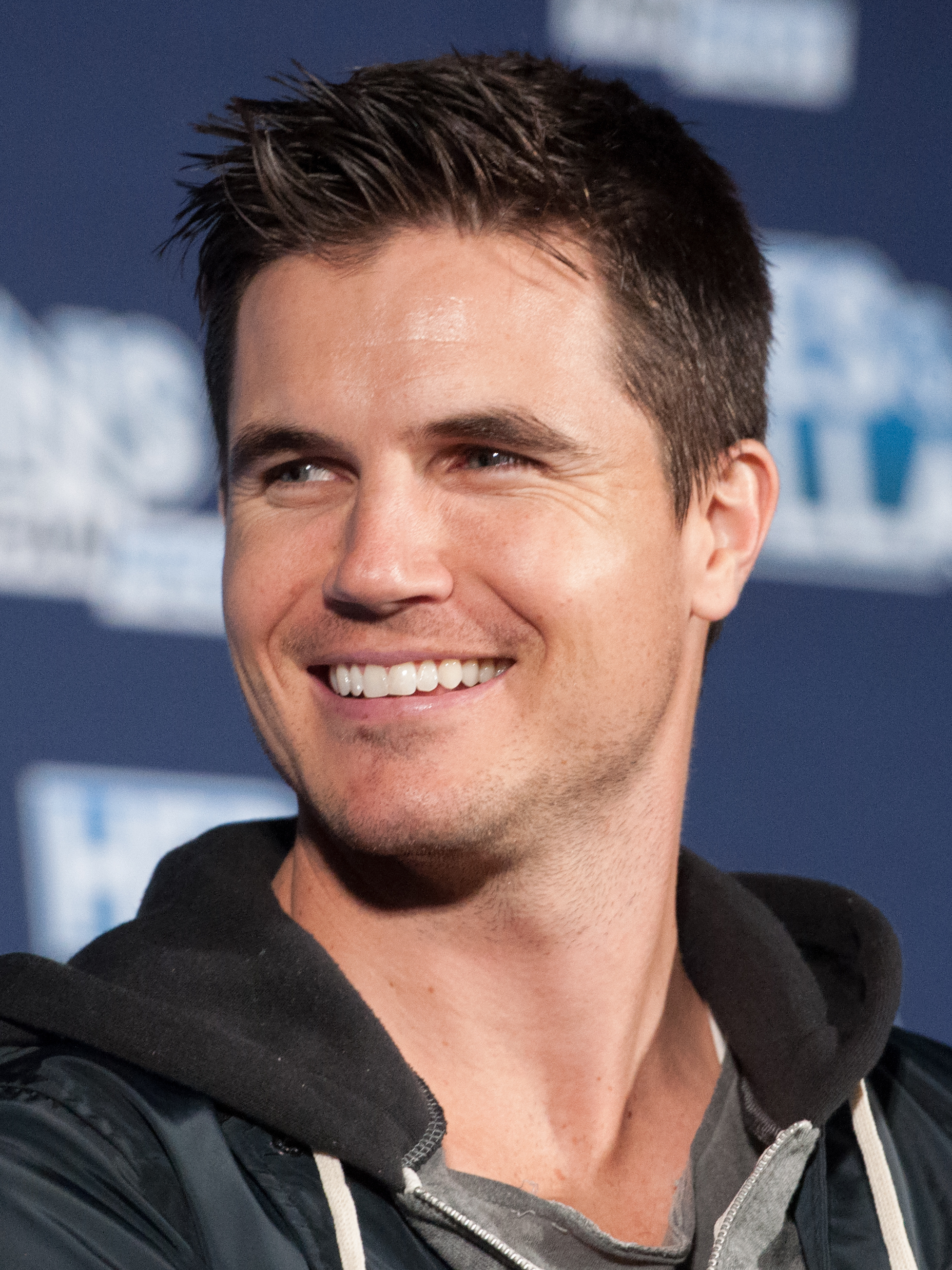
Robbie Amell
(Fred Jones)

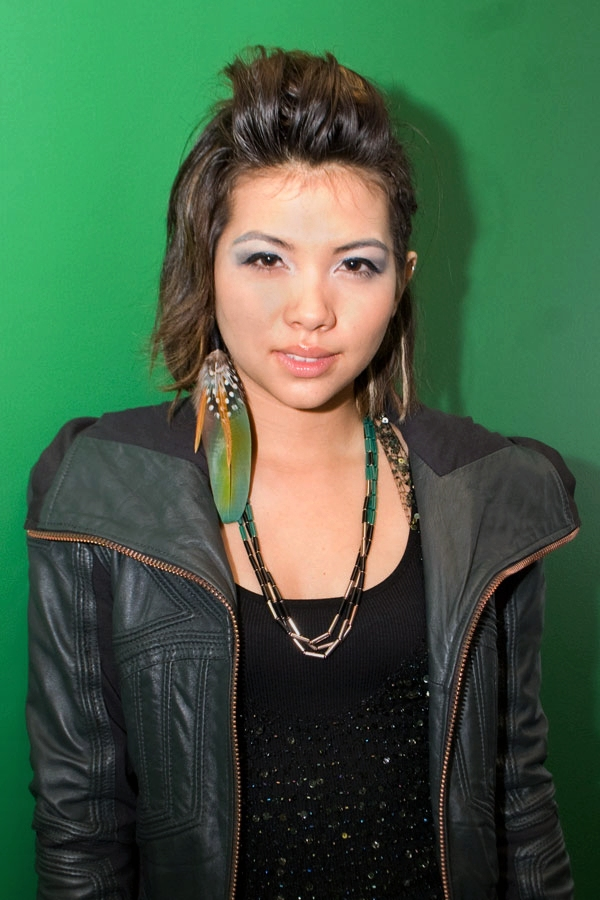
Hayley Kiyoko
(Velma Dinkley)

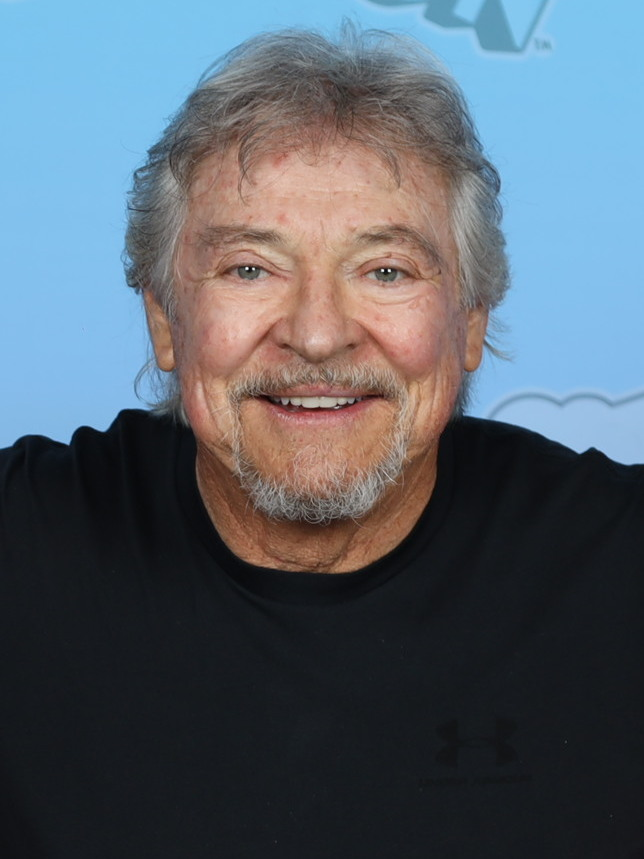
Frank Welker
(Scooby-Doo)

- Robbie Amell as Fred Jones
- Hayley Kiyoko as Velma Dinkley
- Kate Melton as Daphne Blake
- Nick Palatas as Shaggy Rogers
- Frank Welker as Scooby-Doo
- Ted McGinley as Thorny Blake V
- Richard Moll as Elmer Uggins
- Nichelle Nichols as Senator
- Marion Ross as Hilda Trowburg
- Beverly Sanders as Wanda Grubwort

== Trailer ==
A short trailer of the film aired on Cartoon Network on August 1, 2010, depicting Scooby and Shaggy at the beach.

== Ratings ==
The television premiere had 5.1 million viewers.

== Home media ==
The film was released on DVD by Warner Home Video on March 1, 2011. Warner Bros. Home Entertainment distributed the film on Blu-ray Disc.
