= Scooby-Doo =

Warner Bros. media franchise

Scooby-Doo!
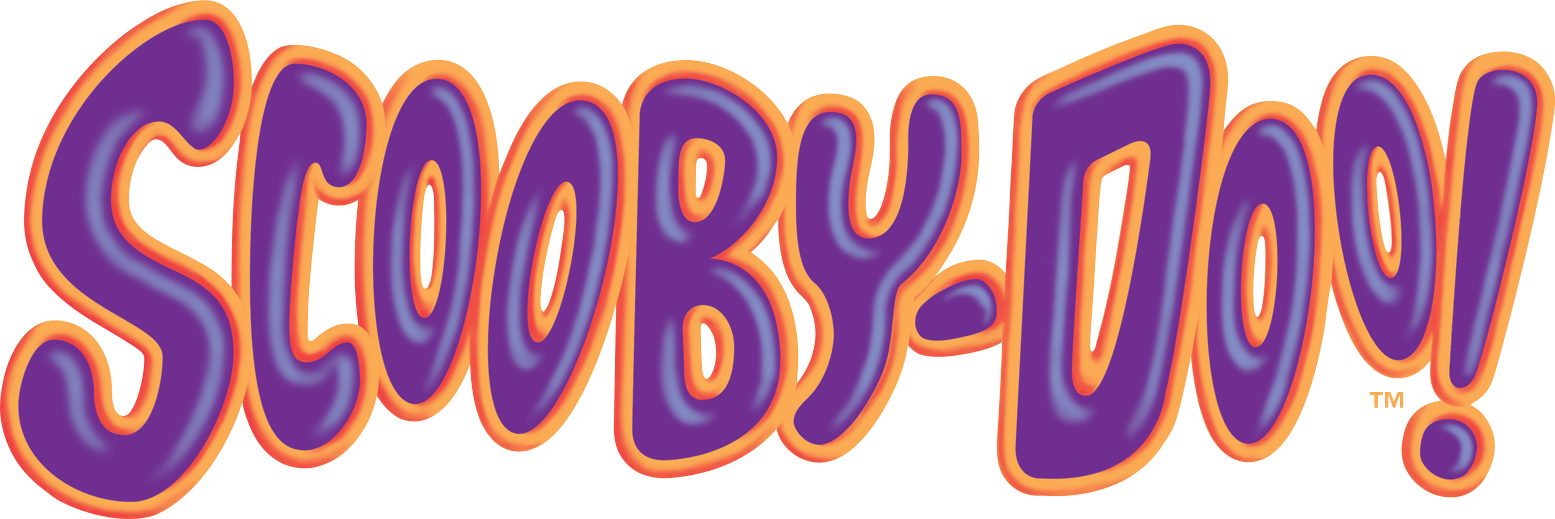
- Franchise logo since 1997
- Created by: Joe Ruby; Ken Spears
- Original work: Scooby-Doo, Where Are You! (1969–1970)
- Owners: Warner Bros. Entertainment (Skydance)
- Years: 1969–present

Print publications
- Comics: see List of comics

Films and television
- Films: see List of films
- Television series: see List of television series
- Television specials: see List of specials
- Television shorts: see List of TV shorts

Games
- Video games: see List of video games

Audio
- Soundtracks: The Ultimate Collection; Scooby-Doo; Scoob!

Miscellaneous
- Network History: CBS (1969–1973); ABC (1976–1991); Kids' WB (The WB/The CW) (2002–2008); Cartoon Network (1993–present) (Note: Years include reruns and original programming); Boomerang (2000–present); HBO Max (2021–2024) (Note: Known as Max from May 2023 to July 2025); MeTV Toons (2024–present) (Note: In reruns)

Official website
- www.warnerbros.com/brands/scooby-doo

Scooby-Doo (often written as Scooby-Doo!) is an American media franchise created in 1969 by writers Joe Ruby and Ken Spears through their animated series, Scooby-Doo, Where Are You!, for Hanna-Barbera. The series features four teenagers: Fred Jones, Daphne Blake, Velma Dinkley, and Shaggy Rogers, and their talking Great Dane, Scooby-Doo, who solve mysteries involving supposedly supernatural creatures through a series of antics and missteps, while traveling in a brightly colored van called the Mystery Machine. The franchise has numerous shows, films, and specials.

Scooby-Doo was originally broadcast on CBS from 1969 to 1976, when it moved to ABC. ABC aired various versions of Scooby-Doo until canceling it in 1986, and presented a spin-off featuring the characters as children called A Pup Named Scooby-Doo from 1988 to 1991. Following numerous acquisitions, Hanna-Barbera was eventually absorbed into Warner Bros. Animation, a unit of Warner Bros. Entertainment, in 2001.

Two Scooby-Doo reboots aired as part of Kids' WB on The WB and its successor The CW from 2002 to 2008. Further reboots originally aired on Cartoon Network from 2010 to 2016, Cartoon Network's sister channel Boomerang and its video on demand service from 2017 to 2021, and HBO Max (briefly renamed Max) from 2021 to 2024. Repeats of the various Scooby-Doo series are frequently broadcast on Boomerang in the United States and other countries. In 2013, TV Guide ranked Scooby-Doo the fifth-greatest TV cartoon of all time.

== Development ==
Release timeline
1969	Scooby-Doo, Where Are You!
1970
1971
1972	The New Scooby-Doo Movies
1973
1974
1975
1976	The Scooby-Doo Show
1977
1978
1979	Scooby Goes Hollywood
1979	Scooby-Doo and Scrappy-Doo (1979 TV series)
1980	Scooby-Doo and Scrappy-Doo (1980 TV series)
1981
1982	The Scooby & Scrappy-Doo/Puppy Hour
1983	The New Scooby and Scrappy-Doo Show
1984	The New Scooby-Doo Mysteries
1984	Scary Scooby Funnies
1985	The 13 Ghosts of Scooby-Doo
1986	Scooby-Doo
1987	Scooby-Doo Meets the Boo Brothers
1988	Scooby-Doo and the Ghoul School
1988	Scooby-Doo! and the Reluctant Werewolf
1988	A Pup Named Scooby-Doo
1989
1990
1991	Scooby-Doo and Scrappy-Doo (1991 video game)
1992
1993
1994	Arabian Nights
1995	Scooby-Doo Mystery
1996
1997
1998	Scooby-Doo on Zombie Island
1999	Scooby-Doo! and the Witch's Ghost
2000	Scooby-Doo and the Alien Invaders
2001	Scooby-Doo and the Cyber Chase
2002	Scooby-Doo
2002	Scooby-Doo! Night of 100 Frights
2002	What's New, Scooby-Doo?
2003	Scooby-Doo! and the Legend of the Vampire
2003	Scooby-Doo! and the Monster of Mexico
2003	Scooby-Doo! Mystery Mayhem
2004	Scooby-Doo! and the Loch Ness Monster
2004	Scooby-Doo 2: Monsters Unleashed
2005	Aloha, Scooby-Doo!
2005	Scooby-Doo! in Where's My Mummy?
2005	Scooby-Doo! Unmasked
2006	Scooby-Doo! Pirates Ahoy!
2006	Shaggy & Scooby-Doo Get a Clue!
2007	Chill Out, Scooby-Doo!
2008	Scooby-Doo! and the Goblin King
2009	Scooby-Doo! and the Samurai Sword
2009	Scooby-Doo! The Mystery Begins
2009	Scooby-Doo! First Frights
2010	Scooby-Doo! Abracadabra-Doo
2010	Scooby-Doo! and the Spooky Swamp
2010	Scooby-Doo! Camp Scare
2010	Scooby-Doo! Curse of the Lake Monster
2010	Scooby-Doo! Mystery Incorporated
2011	Scooby-Doo! Legend of the Phantosaur
2012	Scooby-Doo! Music of the Vampire
2012	Scooby-Doo! Spooky Games
2012	Big Top Scooby-Doo!
2012	Scooby-Doo! Haunted Holidays
2013	Scooby-Doo! Mask of the Blue Falcon
2013	Scooby-Doo! Adventures: The Mystery Map
2013	Scooby-Doo! Stage Fright
2013	Scooby-Doo! and the Spooky Scarecrow
2013	Scooby-Doo! Mecha Mutt Menace
2014	Scooby-Doo! Ghastly Goals
2014	Scooby-Doo! WrestleMania Mystery
2014	Scooby-Doo! Frankencreepy
2015	Scooby-Doo! Moon Monster Madness
2015	Scooby-Doo! and the Beach Beastie
2015	Be Cool, Scooby-Doo!
2015	Scooby-Doo! and Kiss: Rock and Roll Mystery
2015	Lego Scooby-Doo! Knight Time Terror
2016	Lego Scooby-Doo! Haunted Hollywood
2016	Scooby-Doo! and WWE: Curse of the Speed Demon
2017	Scooby-Doo! Shaggy's Showdown
2017	Lego Scooby-Doo! Blowout Beach Bash
2018	Scooby-Doo! & Batman: The Brave and the Bold
2018	Scooby-Doo! and the Gourmet Ghost
2018	Daphne & Velma
2019	Scooby-Doo! and the Curse of the 13th Ghost
2019	Scooby-Doo! Return to Zombie Island
2019	Scooby-Doo and Guess Who?
2020	Scoob!
2020	Happy Halloween, Scooby-Doo!
2021	Scooby-Doo! The Sword and the Scoob
2021	Straight Outta Nowhere: Scooby-Doo! Meets Courage the Cowardly Dog
2021	Scooby-Doo, Where Are You Now!
2022	Trick or Treat Scooby-Doo!
2023	Velma
2023	Scooby-Doo! and Krypto, Too!
2024	Velma: This Halloween Needs To Be More Special!

In 1968, parent-run organizations, particularly Action for Children's Television (ACT), began protesting what they perceived as excessive violence in Saturday-morning cartoons. Most of these shows were Hanna-Barbera action cartoons such as Space Ghost, The Herculoids, and Birdman and the Galaxy Trio, and virtually all of them were canceled by 1969 because of pressure from the parent groups. Members of these watch groups served as advisers to Hanna-Barbera and other animation studios to ensure that new programs would be safe for children.

Fred Silverman, an executive for daytime programming at CBS, was then looking for a show that would both revitalize his Saturday-morning line and please the watch groups. The result was The Archie Show from Filmation, based on Bob Montana's teenage humor comic book Archie. Also successful were the musical numbers The Archies performed during each program (one of which, "Sugar, Sugar", was the most successful Billboard number-one hit of 1969). Eager to build upon this success, Silverman contacted producers William Hanna and Joseph Barbera about creating another show based on a teenage rock group, this time featuring teens who solved mysteries between gigs. Silverman envisioned the show as a cross between the popular I Love a Mystery radio serials of the 1940s and the Archie characters or the popular early 1960s television series The Many Loves of Dobie Gillis.

After attempting to develop his version of the show, called House of Mystery, Barbera, who developed and sold Hanna-Barbera shows while Hanna produced them, passed the task along to story writers Joe Ruby and Ken Spears, as well as artist/character designer Iwao Takamoto. Their treatment, based in part on The Archie Show, was titled Mysteries Five and featured five teenagers: Geoff, Mike, Kelly, Linda, and Linda's brother W.W., along with their bongo-playing dog, Too Much, who collectively formed the band Mysteries Five. When The Mysteries Five were not performing at gigs, they were out solving spooky mysteries involving ghosts, zombies, and other supernatural creatures. Ruby and Spears were unable to decide whether Too Much would be a large cowardly dog or a small feisty one. When the former was chosen, Ruby and Spears wrote Too Much as a Great Dane but revised the dog character to a large sheepdog (similar to the Archies' sheepdog, Hot Dog) just before their presentation to Silverman, as Ruby feared the character would be too similar to the comic strip character Marmaduke. Silverman rejected their initial pitch, and after consulting with Barbera on next steps, got Barbera's permission to go ahead with Too Much being a Great Dane instead of a sheepdog.

During the design phase, lead character designer Takamoto consulted a studio colleague who was a breeder of Great Danes. After learning the characteristics of a prize-winning Great Dane from her, Takamoto proceeded to break most of the rules and designed Too Much with overly bowed legs, a double chin, and a sloped back, among other abnormalities.

Ruby and Spears' second pass at the show used Dobie Gillis as the template for the teenagers rather than Archie. The treatment retained the dog Too Much, while reducing the number of teenagers to four, removing the Mike character and retaining Geoff, Kelly, Linda, and W.W. Their personalities were modified, so were the characters' names: Geoff became Ronnie—later renamed Fred (at Silverman's behest), Kelly became Daphne, Linda Velma, and W.W. Shaggy. The teens were now based on four teenage characters from The Many Loves of Dobie Gillis: Dobie Gillis, Thalia Menninger, Zelda Gilroy, and Maynard G. Krebs, respectively.

The revised show was re-pitched to Silverman, who liked the material but, disliking the title Mysteries Five, decided to call the show "Who's S-S-Scared?". Silverman presented Who's S-S-Scared? to the CBS executives as the centerpiece for the upcoming 1969–70 season's Saturday-morning cartoon block. CBS president Frank Stanton felt that the presentation artwork was too scary for young viewers and, thinking the show would be the same, decided to pass on it.

Now without a centerpiece for the upcoming season's programming, Silverman had Ruby, Spears, and the Hanna-Barbera staff revise the treatments and presentation materials to tone down the show and better reflect its comedy elements. The rock band element was dropped, and more attention was focused on Shaggy and Too Much. According to Ruby and Spears, Silverman was inspired by Frank Sinatra's scat "doo-be-doo-be-doo" at the end of his recording of "Strangers in the Night" on a red-eye flight to one of the development meetings, and decided to rename the dog "Scooby-Doo" and retitled the show "Scooby-Doo, Where Are You!". The revised show was re-presented to CBS executives, who approved it for production.

== CBS years (1969–76) ==
Every episode of the original Scooby-Doo format contains a penultimate scene in which the heroes unmask the seemingly supernatural antagonist to reveal a real person in a costume, as in this scene from "Nowhere to Hyde", an episode of Scooby-Doo, Where Are You!, originally aired on CBS on September 12, 1970.

=== Scooby-Doo, Where Are You! ===
The first episode of Scooby-Doo, Where Are You!, "What a Night for a Knight", debuted on the CBS network Saturday, September 13, 1969, at 10:30 AM Eastern Time. The original voice cast featured Don Messick as Scooby-Doo, Casey Kasem as Shaggy, Frank Welker as Fred, actress Nicole Jaffe as Velma, and Indira Stefanianna as Daphne. Scooby's speech patterns closely resembled an earlier cartoon dog, Astro from The Jetsons (1962–63), also voiced by Messick. Seventeen episodes of Scooby-Doo, Where Are You! were produced in 1969–70. The series theme song was written by David Mook and Ben Raleigh, and performed by Larry Marks.

Each of these episodes features Scooby and the four teenage members of Mystery, Inc.: Fred, Shaggy, Daphne, and Velma, arriving at a location in the Mystery Machine, a van painted with psychedelic colors and flower power imagery. Encountering a purportedly supernatural monster terrorizing the local populace, such as a ghost, they decide to investigate. The kids split up to look for clues and suspects, while being chased at turns by the monster. Eventually, the kids come to realize the paranormal activity is actually an elaborate hoax, and—often with the help of a Rube Goldberg-like trap designed by Fred—they capture the creature suit-wearing villain and unmask him or her. Revealed usually as a flesh and blood crook who used the costume to cover up their crimes, the villain is arrested and taken to jail, often with the catchphrase "if it weren't for those pesky/meddling kids!". A few times though, the "villain" turns out to be innocent, such as a haywire robot or the owner disguised to scare away thieves. However, in all cases, the 'supernatural' element of the mystery was revealed to be phony -- in the end, there were no actual ghosts or monsters featured on the show.

Scheduled opposite another teenage mystery-solving show, ABC's The Hardy Boys, Scooby-Doo became a ratings success, with Nielsen ratings reporting that as many as 65% of Saturday-morning audiences were tuned in to CBS when Scooby-Doo was being broadcast. The show was renewed for a second season in 1970, for which eight episodes were produced. Seven of the second-season episodes featured chase sequences set to bubblegum pop songs recorded by Austin Roberts, who also re-recorded the theme song for this season. With Stefanianna Christopherson having married and retired from voice acting, Heather North assumed the role of Daphne, and she continued to voice the character until 1997.

The TV influences of I Love a Mystery and Dobie Gillis were apparent in the first episode. Of the similarities between the Scooby-Doo teens and the Dobie Gillis teens, the similarities between Shaggy and Maynard are the most noticeable; both characters share the same beatnik-style goatee, similar hairstyles, and demeanors. The core premise of Scooby-Doo, Where Are You! was also similar to Enid Blyton's Famous Five books. Both series featured four youths with a dog, and the Famous Five stories often revolved around a mystery which invariably turned out not to be supernaturally based, but simply a ruse to disguise the villain's true intent.

The role of each character was strongly defined in the series: Fred is the leader and the determined detective, Velma is the intelligent analyst, Daphne is danger-prone, Shaggy is a coward more motivated by hunger than any desire to solve mysteries, and Scooby is similar to Shaggy, save for a Bob Hope-inspired tendency towards temporary bravery. Later versions of the show made slight changes to the characters' established roles, such as showing the Daphne in 1990s and 2000s Scooby-Doo productions as knowing many forms of karate and having the ability to defend herself, and reducing her tendency towards being kidnapped.

Scooby-Doo itself influenced many other Saturday-morning cartoons of the 1970s. During that decade, Hanna-Barbera and its rivals produced several animated programs also featuring teenage detectives solving mysteries with a pet or mascot of some sort, including Josie and the Pussycats (1970–71), The Funky Phantom (1971–72), The Amazing Chan and the Chan Clan (1972–73), Speed Buggy (1973–74), Goober and the Ghost Chasers (1973–74), Jabberjaw (1976–78), and Captain Caveman and the Teen Angels (1977–80).

=== The New Scooby-Doo Movies ===
In the fall of 1972, new one-hour episodes under the title The New Scooby-Doo Movies were created; each episode featuring a real or fictitious guest star helping the gang solve mysteries, including characters from other Hanna-Barbera series such as Harlem Globetrotters, Josie and the Pussycats and Speed Buggy, the comic book characters Batman and Robin (adapted into their own Hanna-Barbera series, Super Friends, a year later), and celebrities such as Sandy Duncan, The Addams Family, Cass Elliot, Phyllis Diller, Don Knotts and The Three Stooges. Hanna-Barbera musical director Hoyt Curtin composed a new theme song for this series, and Curtin's theme remained in use for much of Scooby-Doo's original broadcast run. After two seasons and 24 episodes of the New Movies format from 1972 to 1973, CBS began airing reruns of the original Scooby-Doo, Where Are You! series until its option on the series expired in 1976.

== ABC years (1976–91) ==
=== The Scooby-Doo Show and Scooby's All-Star Laff-A-Lympics ===
Now president of ABC, Fred Silverman made a deal with Hanna-Barbera to bring new episodes of Scooby-Doo to the ABC Saturday-morning lineup, where the show went through almost yearly lineup changes. For their 1976–77 season, 16 new episodes of Scooby-Doo were joined with a new Hanna-Barbera show, Dynomutt, Dog Wonder, to create The Scooby-Doo/Dynomutt Hour (the show became The Scooby-Doo/Dynomutt Show when a bonus Scooby-Doo, Where Are You! rerun was added to the package in November 1976). Joe Ruby and Ken Spears, now working for Silverman as supervisors of the ABC Saturday-morning programs, returned the program to its original Scooby-Doo, Where Are You! format, with the addition of Scooby's dim-witted country cousin Scooby-Dum, voiced by Daws Butler, as a recurring character. The voice cast was held over from The New Scooby-Doo Movies save for Nicole Jaffe, who retired from acting in 1973. Pat Stevens took over her role as the voice of Velma.

Joe Ruby and Ken Spears left again in 1977, this time to start their own studio as competition for Hanna-Barbera. They would remain away for the rest of the 1980s.

For the 1977–78 season, The Scooby-Doo/Dynomutt Show became the two-hour programming block Scooby's All-Star Laff-A-Lympics (1977–78) with the addition of Laff-a-Lympics and Captain Caveman and the Teen Angels. In addition to eight new episodes of Scooby-Doo and reruns of the 1969 show, Scooby-Doo also appeared during the All-Star block's Laff-a-Lympics series, which featured 45 Hanna-Barbera characters competing in Battle of the Network Stars-esque parodies of Olympic sporting events. Scooby was seen as the team captain of the Laff-a-Lympics "Scooby-Doobies" team, which also featured Shaggy and Scooby-Dum among its members.

Scooby's All-Star Laff-a-Lympics was retitled Scooby's All Stars for the 1978–79 season, reduced to 90 minutes when Dynomutt was spun off into its own half-hour and the 1969 reruns were dropped. Scooby's All-Stars continued broadcasting reruns of Scooby-Doo from 1976 and 1977, while new episodes of Scooby-Doo aired during a separate half-hour under the Scooby-Doo, Where Are You! banner. After nine weeks, the separate Where Are You! broadcast was cancelled, and the remainder of the 16 new 1978 episodes debuted during the Scooby's All-Stars block. The 40 total Scooby-Doo episodes produced from 1976 to 1978 were later packaged together for syndication as The Scooby-Doo Show, under which title they continue to air.

=== Scooby-Doo and Scrappy-Doo ===
The Scooby-Doo characters first appeared outside of their regular Saturday-morning format in Scooby Goes Hollywood, an hour-long ABC television special aired in prime time on December 13, 1979. The special revolved around Shaggy and Scooby attempting to convince the network to move Scooby out of Saturday morning and into a prime-time series, and featured spoofs of then-current television series and films such as Happy Days, Superman: The Movie, Laverne & Shirley and Charlie's Angels.

In 1979, Scooby's tiny nephew Scrappy-Doo was added to both the series and the billing, in an attempt to boost Scooby-Doo's slipping ratings. The 1979–80 episodes, aired under the new title Scooby-Doo and Scrappy-Doo as an independent half-hour show, succeeded in regenerating interest in the show. Lennie Weinrib voiced Scrappy in the 1979–80 episodes, with Don Messick assuming the role thereafter. Marla Frumkin replaced Pat Stevens as the voice of Velma mid-season.

=== Scooby-Doo and Scrappy-Doo shorts ===
As a result of Scooby-Doo and Scrappy-Doo's success, the entire show was overhauled in 1980 to focus more upon Scrappy-Doo. At this time, Scooby-Doo started to walk and run anthropomorphically on two feet more often, rather than on four like a normal dog as he did previously. Fred, Daphne, and Velma were dropped from the series, and the new Scooby-Doo and Scrappy-Doo format now consisted of three seven-minute comedic adventures starring Scooby, Scrappy, and Shaggy instead of one half-hour mystery. Most of the supernatural villains in the seven-minute Scooby and Scrappy cartoons, who in previous Scooby series had been revealed to be human criminals in costume, were now real within the context of the series.

This version of Scooby-Doo and Scrappy-Doo first aired from 1980 to 1982 as part of The Richie Rich/Scooby-Doo Show, an hour-long program also featuring episodes of Hanna-Barbera's new Richie Rich cartoon, adapted from the Harvey Comics character. From 1982 to 1983, Scooby-Doo and Scrappy-Doo were part of The Scooby-Doo/Scrappy-Doo/Puppy Hour, a co-production with Ruby-Spears Productions which featured two Scooby and Scrappy shorts, a Scrappy and Yabba-Doo short featuring Scrappy-Doo and his Western deputy uncle Yabba-Doo, and The Puppy's New Adventures, based on characters from a 1977 Ruby-Spears TV special. Despite the popularity, this was negatively hated by fans for how it dropped the mystery format and other main characters like Fred, Daphne, and Velma.

Beginning in 1980, a half-hour of reruns from previous incarnations of Scooby-Doo were broadcast on ABC Saturday mornings in addition to first-run episodes. Airing under the titles Scooby-Doo Classics, Scary Scooby Funnies, The Best of Scooby-Doo, and Scooby's Mystery Funhouse, the rerun package remained on the air until the end of the 1986 season.

=== The New Scooby and Scrappy-Doo Show ===
Scooby-Doo was restored to a standalone half-hour in 1983 with The New Scooby and Scrappy-Doo Show in 1983, which comprised two 11-minute mysteries per episode in a format reminiscent of the original Scooby-Doo, Where Are You! mysteries. Heather North returned to the voice cast as Daphne, who in this incarnation solved mysteries with Shaggy, Scooby, and Scrappy while working undercover as a reporter for a teen magazine.

This version of the show lasted for two seasons, with the second season airing under the title The New Scooby-Doo Mysteries. The 1984–85 season episodes featured semi-regular appearances from Fred and Velma, with Frank Welker and Marla Frumkin resuming their respective roles for these episodes.

=== The 13 Ghosts of Scooby-Doo ===
1985 saw the debut of The 13 Ghosts of Scooby-Doo, which featured Daphne, Shaggy, Scooby, Scrappy, and new characters Flim-Flam (voiced by Susan Blu) and Vincent Van Ghoul (based upon and voiced by Vincent Price) traveling the globe to capture "thirteen of the most terrifying ghosts upon the face of the earth." The final first-run episode of The 13 Ghosts of Scooby-Doo aired in December 1985, and after its reruns were removed from the ABC lineup the following March, no new Scooby series aired on the network for the next two years.

=== A Pup Named Scooby-Doo ===
In 1988, after ABC's initiative to shift its Saturday morning block toward preschoolers had spectacularly failed (in part, ABC alleged, due to the introduction of people meters that preschoolers were too young to operate), ABC launched an initiative to revive classic properties that older children and parents of younger children would recognize. Hanna-Barbera reincarnated the original Scooby-Doo, Where Are You! cast as elementary school students (a common trope in 1980s children's TV) for a new series titled A Pup Named Scooby-Doo, which debuted on ABC in 1988.

A Pup Named Scooby-Doo was an irreverent re-imagining of the series, heavily inspired by the classic cartoons of Tex Avery and Bob Clampett, and eschewed the realistic aesthetic of the original Scooby series for a more Looney Tunes-like style, including an episode where Scooby-Doo's parents show up and reveal his real name to be "Scoobert". At the same time, the series returned to its original formula in that the group unmasked human villains in costume, as opposed to the supernatural monsters of the early to mid-1980s. The series also established "Coolsville" as the name of the gang's hometown; this setting was retained for several of the later Scooby productions. The retooled show was a success, remaining in production for four seasons and on ABC's lineup until 1991.

A Pup Named Scooby-Doo was developed and produced by Tom Ruegger, who had been the head story editor on Scooby-Doo since 1983. Following the first season of A Pup Named Scooby-Doo, Ruegger and much of his unit defected from Hanna-Barbera to Warner Bros. Animation to develop Steven Spielberg Presents Tiny Toon Adventures and later Animaniacs, Pinky and the Brain, and Freakazoid!.

== Kids' WB years (2002–08) ==
=== What's New, Scooby-Doo? ===
In 2002, following the successes of the Cartoon Network reruns, the direct to video franchise, and the first feature film, Scooby-Doo returned to Saturday morning for the first time in a decade with What's New, Scooby-Doo?, which aired on Kids' WB from 2002 until 2006. Produced by Warner Bros. Animation, the show follows the format of the original series but updates the setting to the 21st century, featuring frequent inclusion of then-modern technology in the 2000s (computers, DVD, the Internet, cell phones) and culture.

Beginning with this series, Frank Welker took over as Scooby's voice actor, while continuing to provide the voice of Fred as well. Casey Kasem returned as Shaggy, on the condition that the character be depicted as a vegetarian like Kasem himself. Grey DeLisle continued to voice Daphne, and former Facts of Life star Mindy Cohn voiced Velma. The series was produced by Chuck Sheetz, who had worked on The Simpsons.

=== Shaggy & Scooby-Doo Get a Clue! ===
In September 2006, a new show entitled Shaggy & Scooby-Doo Get a Clue! debuted on The CW's Kids' WB Saturday-morning programming block. In the new premise, Shaggy inherits money and a mansion from an uncle, an inventor who has gone into hiding from villains trying to steal his secret invention. The villains, led by "Dr. Phibes" (based primarily upon Dr. Evil from the Austin Powers series, and named after Vincent Price's character from The Abominable Dr. Phibes), then use different schemes to try to get the invention from Shaggy and Scooby, who handle the plots alone. Fred, Daphne, and Velma are normally absent, but do make appearances at times to help. The characters were redesigned and the art style revised for the new series. Scott Menville voiced Shaggy in the series, with Casey Kasem appearing as the voice of Shaggy's Uncle Albert. Shaggy & Scooby-Doo Get a Clue! ran for two seasons on The CW.

== Cartoon Network and Boomerang years (2010–21) ==
=== Scooby-Doo! Mystery Incorporated ===
The next Scooby series, Scooby-Doo! Mystery Incorporated, premiered on Cartoon Network on April 5, 2010. The first Scooby series produced for cable television, Mystery Incorporated is a reboot of the franchise, re-establishing the characters' relationships, personalities, and locations, and expanding their world to feature their parents, high school, and neighbors. The series also borrowed pieces from many parts of Scooby-Doo's long history, as well as characters and elements of other Hanna-Barbera shows to form its back story and the bases of some of its episodes. Matthew Lillard was brought over from the live-action theatrical series as the new voice of Shaggy, while Welker, Cohn, and DeLisle continued in their respective roles. Patrick Warburton, Linda Cardellini, Lewis Black, Vivica A. Fox, Gary Cole, Udo Kier, Tim Matheson, Tia Carrere, and Kate Higgins were added as new semi-regular cast members. Casey Kasem appeared in a recurring role as Shaggy's father, one of his last roles before retiring due to declining health.

The series, while still following the basic mystery-solving format of its predecessors, was broadcast as a 52-chapter animated televised novel and included elements similar to live-action mystery/adventure shows such as Buffy the Vampire Slayer and Lost. An overarching mystery surrounding the gang's hometown of Crystal Cove, California became the series' main story arc, with pieces to the mystery unfolding episode by episode. Also featured were romantic entanglements and interpersonal conflict between the lead characters. The series ran for 52 episodes over two seasons, with a three-part finale airing across April 4 and 5, 2013—exactly three years from the debut.

=== Be Cool, Scooby-Doo! ===
On March 10, 2014, Cartoon Network announced several new series based on classic cartoons, including a new Scooby-Doo animated series titled Be Cool, Scooby-Doo!. The show features the gang "living it up" the summer after the gang's senior year of high school. Along the way, they run into monsters and mayhem. The series premiered October 5, 2015 on Cartoon Network and concluded on March 18, 2018.

=== Scooby-Doo and Guess Who? ===
The Scooby-Doo series Scooby-Doo and Guess Who? premiered on the Boomerang streaming service and app on June 27, 2019. It ran for two seasons, with the second half of the second season airing on HBO Max. The series features the Mystery Inc. gang teaming up with a variety of guest stars to solve mysteries. Guest stars included Halsey, Sia, Bill Nye, Mark Hamill, Neil deGrasse Tyson, Ricky Gervais, Kenan Thompson, and Chris Paul. The series also includes fictional guest stars, including Steve Urkel (played by Jaleel White), Batman (played by Kevin Conroy), Wonder Woman (played by Rachel Kimsey), the Flash, and Sherlock Holmes.

== Streaming era (2021–present) ==
=== Scooby-Doo and Guess Who? ===
The remaining eleven episodes of the second season were released through HBO Max on October 1, 2021.

=== Velma ===
Velma is an adult-oriented animated series that premiered on HBO Max on January 12, 2023. It ran for two seasons, and marked the first full original Scooby Doo related show on HBO Max since the previous series Guess Who? was picked up by it at the end of its run (originating on Boomerang). The series is an alternate reality prequel and spinoff to the main franchise, taking place before the formation of Mystery Inc., and does not include Scooby-Doo himself. Unlike in the previous series and films, the main characters and voice cast in Velma are multi-racial.

=== Scooby-Doo: Origins ===
On April 29, 2024, Deadline reported that a live-action Scooby-Doo! series is in development by Berlanti Productions on Netflix, with Josh Appelbaum and Scott Rosenberg writing; and Greg Berlanti, Sarah Schechter, Leigh London Redman, André Nemec, Jeff Pinkner, Jonathan Gabay and Midnight Radio's Adrienne Erickson executive producing. In March 2025, the series was confirmed to be in production.

The series will consist of eight episodes.

Principal photography is expected to begin in early 2026. On December 31, 2025, Frank Welker was revealed to be reprising his voice role of Scooby-Doo in the series. Mckenna Grace joined the cast as Daphne Blake in February 2026, having previously voiced a younger version of the character in Scoob! In March 2026, it was announced that Tanner Hagen, Abby Ryder Fortson and Maxwell Jenkins will be playing Shaggy Rogers, Velma Dinkley and Fred Jones respectively.

In April 2026, Netflix announced that the series, titled Scooby-Doo: Origins, had entered production in Atlanta.

=== Yokoso Scooby-Doo! ===
On June 12, 2024, Warner Bros. Animation announced that a spin-off anime series titled Go-Go Mystery Machine following the adventures of Scooby-Doo and Shaggy while visiting Japan was in development at the studio. On May 18, 2026, Tubi announced that it had acquired the anime series, now titled Yokoso Scooby-Doo!, for the North American market, with Frank Welker and Matthew Lillard set to return as the voices of Scooby-Doo and Shaggy, respectively. Cartoon Network will broadcast the series outside of North America. Itsuro Kawasaki will direct the series, Francisco Paredes will co-produce, and OLM will provide production services.

== Film and rerun history ==
=== Television films, reruns, and direct-to-video films ===
From 1987 to 1988, Hanna-Barbera Productions produced Hanna-Barbera Superstars 10, a series of syndicated television films featuring their most popular characters, including Yogi Bear, Huckleberry Hound, The Flintstones, and The Jetsons. Scooby-Doo, Scrappy-Doo and Shaggy starred in three of these films: Scooby-Doo Meets the Boo Brothers (1987), Scooby-Doo and the Ghoul School (1988), and Scooby-Doo and the Reluctant Werewolf (1988). These three films took their tone from the early-1980s Scooby-Doo and Scrappy-Doo entries, and featured the characters encountering actual monsters and ghosts rather than masqueraded people. Scooby-Doo and Shaggy later appeared as the narrators of the television film Arabian Nights, originally broadcast by TBS in 1994, Don Messick's final outing as the original voice of Scooby-Doo.

Reruns of Scooby-Doo have been in syndication since 1980, and have also been shown on cable television networks such as TBS Superstation (until 1989) and USA Network (as part of the USA Cartoon Express from 1990 to 1994). In 1993, A Pup Named Scooby-Doo, having just recently ended its network run on ABC, began reruns on Cartoon Network. With Turner Broadcasting purchasing Hanna-Barbera in 1991, in 1994 the Scooby-Doo franchise became exclusive to the Turner networks: Cartoon Network, TBS Superstation, and TNT. Canadian network Teletoon began airing Scooby-Doo, Where Are You! in 1997, with the other Scooby series soon following. When TBS and TNT ended their broadcasts of H-B cartoons in 1998, Scooby-Doo became the exclusive property of both Cartoon Network and sister station Boomerang.

With Scooby-Doo's restored popularity in reruns on Cartoon Network, Warner Bros. Animation and Hanna-Barbera (by then a subsidiary of Warner Bros. following the merger of Time Warner and Turner Entertainment in 1996) began producing one new Scooby-Doo direct-to-video film a year, beginning in 1998. These films featured a slightly older version of the original five-character cast from the Scooby-Doo, Where Are You! days. The first four DTV entries were Scooby-Doo on Zombie Island (1998), Scooby-Doo! and the Witch's Ghost (1999), Scooby-Doo and the Alien Invaders (2000), and Scooby-Doo and the Cyber Chase (2001). Frank Welker was the only original voice cast member to return for these productions. Don Messick had died in 1997 and Casey Kasem, a strict vegetarian, relinquished the role of Shaggy after having to provide the voice for a 1995 Burger King commercial. Therefore, Scott Innes took over as both Scooby-Doo and Shaggy (Billy West voiced Shaggy in Scooby-Doo on Zombie Island). B.J. Ward took over as Velma, and Mary Kay Bergman voiced Daphne until her death in November 1999, and was replaced by Grey DeLisle.

These first four direct-to-video films differed from the original series format by placing the characters in plots with a darker tone and pitting them against actual supernatural forces. Scooby-Doo on Zombie Island, featured the original 1969 gang, reunited after years of being apart, fighting voodoo-worshiping cat creatures in the Louisiana bayou. Scooby-Doo! and the Witch's Ghost featured an author (voice of Tim Curry) returning to his Massachusetts hometown with the gang, to find out that an event is being haunted by the author's dead ancestor Sarah, who was an actual witch. The Witch's Ghost introduced a goth rock band known as The Hex Girls, who became recurring characters in the Scooby-Doo franchise.

Scooby-Doo and the Cyber Chase was the final production made by the Hanna-Barbera studio, which was absorbed into parent company Warner Bros. Animation following William Hanna's death in 2001. Warner Animation continued production of the direct-to-video series while also producing new Scooby-Doo series for television.

The direct-to-video productions continued to be produced concurrently with at least one entry per year through to 2023. Two of these entries, Scooby-Doo! and the Legend of the Vampire and Scooby-Doo! and the Monster of Mexico (both 2003) were produced in a retro-style reminiscent of the original series, and featured Heather North and Nicole Jaffe as the voices of Daphne and Velma, respectively. Later entries produced between 2004 and 2009 were done in the style of What's New, Scooby-Doo, using that show's voice cast. Entries from 2010 on use the original 1969 designs and feature Matthew Lillard as the voice of Shaggy, the character Lillard portrayed in the live-action theatrical Scooby-Doo films. Two Scooby-Doo! movies were released in 2016, named Lego Scooby-Doo! Haunted Hollywood and Scooby-Doo! and WWE: Curse of the Speed Demon.

=== Scooby-Doo! direct-to-video specials ===
Beginning in 2012, Warner Bros. Animation began producing direct-to-video special episodes in the style of the concurrently produced films for inclusion on Scooby-Doo compilation DVD sets otherwise including episodes from previous Scooby series. These include Scooby-Doo! Spooky Games, included on the July 2012 release Scooby-Doo! Laff-A-Lympics: Spooky Games, Scooby-Doo! Haunted Holidays, from the October 2012 release Scooby-Doo! 13 Spooky Tales: Holiday Chills and Thrills, and Scooby-Doo! and the Spooky Scarecrow and Scooby-Doo! Mecha Mutt Menace, from the September 2013 DVD releases Scooby-Doo! 13 Spooky Tales: Run for Your 'Rife! and Scooby-Doo! 13 Spooky Tales: Ruh-Roh Robot!. On May 13, 2014, another episode, Scooby-Doo! Ghastly Goals was released on the Scooby-Doo! 13 Spooky Tales: Field of Screams DVD. On May 5, 2015, Scooby-Doo! and the Beach Beastie, the sixth direct-to-video special, was released on the Scooby-Doo! 13 Spooky Tales: Surf's Up Scooby-Doo DVD.

The direct-to-video series' 34th installment, Trick or Treat Scooby-Doo! (2022), made headlines for portraying Velma as a lesbian (by showing her "crushing big time" on a female guest character), which was in accordance with long-held fan speculation but had never previously been depicted.

=== Live-action films ===
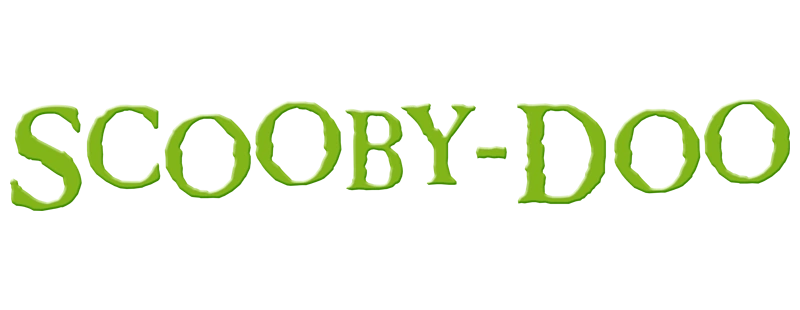
Scooby-Doo (2002) logo

A feature-length live-action film version of Scooby-Doo was released by Warner Bros. Pictures on June 14, 2002. Directed by Raja Gosnell, the film starred Freddie Prinze Jr. as Fred, Sarah Michelle Gellar as Daphne, Matthew Lillard as Shaggy, and Linda Cardellini as Velma. Scooby-Doo, voiced by Neil Fanning, was created on-screen by computer-generated special effects. Scooby-Doo was a financially successful release, with a domestic box office gross of over US$130 million, despite poor reviews from critics.

A sequel, Scooby-Doo 2: Monsters Unleashed, followed in March 2004 with the same cast and director. Scooby-Doo 2 earned US$84 (€55.98) million at the U.S. box office. A third film was planned, but later scrapped following Warner Bros.' disappointment at the returns from Scooby-Doo 2.

In addition, a live-action television film, Scooby-Doo! The Mystery Begins, was released on DVD and simultaneously aired on Cartoon Network on September 13, 2009, the 40th anniversary of the series' debut. The film starred Nick Palatas as Shaggy, Robbie Amell as Fred, Kate Melton as Daphne, Hayley Kiyoko as Velma, and Frank Welker as the voice of Scooby-Doo. A second live-action TV movie, Scooby-Doo! Curse of the Lake Monster, retained the same cast and aired on October 16, 2010, and a direct-to-video spin-off Daphne & Velma in 2018. The Mystery Begins and Curse of the Lake Monster served as a reboot series to the franchise, while Daphne and Velma serves as a spin-off/prequel.

=== Theatrical animated film ===
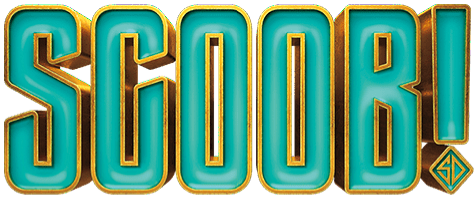
Scoob! (2020) logo

In 2013, Warner Bros. Pictures was developing a fully animated Scooby-Doo feature film with Warner Animation Group. Charles Roven and Richard Suckle, who produced the first two live-action films, were producing the animated film, and Matt Lieberman was writing the film. In 2014, Warner Bros. was restarting the film series with Randall Green writing a new movie. In 2015, Warner Bros. had Tony Cervone lined up to direct an animated film, with Allison Abbate as producer and Dan Povenmire as executive producer. Originally planned for a September 21, 2018 release, it was later pushed back to May 15, 2020, with Dax Shepard co-directing and co-writing. The Hollywood Reporter announced that Frank Welker will be reprising his voice role as Scooby, and that he will be joined by Will Forte and Gina Rodriguez voicing Shaggy and Velma, while Tracy Morgan will be voicing Captain Caveman, from the Hanna-Barbera series Captain Caveman and the Teen Angels and Deadline reported that Zac Efron and Amanda Seyfried will voice Fred and Daphne. In addition, Ken Jeong will be voicing Dynomutt, Dog Wonder from Hanna-Barbera series of the same name and Kiersey Clemons will voice Dee Dee Skyes, a character from Captain Caveman and the Teen Angels. Blue Falcon, from Dynomutt, Dog Wonder voiced by Mark Wahlberg and Dick Dastardly, from Hanna-Barbera's Wacky Races, will be the film's main antagonist, voiced by Jason Isaacs. In March 2020, the film's theatrical release was delayed indefinitely due to the COVID-19 pandemic. On April 22, 2020, Warner Bros. announced that due to movie theater closures the theatrical release for Scoob! had been cancelled, with the film released instead on Premium video on demand in the United States and Canada on May 15, 2020, the original date of release. In July 2020, Warner Bros. confirmed the film would still play in theaters in select countries with relaxed COVID-19 restrictions. The film subsequently received a secondary theatrical release in the United States beginning on May 21, 2021, in selected markets.

== Cast ==
A scene from "What a Night for a Knight", the first episode of Scooby-Doo, Where Are You!. Clockwise from top: Shaggy Rogers, Fred Jones, Scooby-Doo, Velma Dinkley, and Daphne Blake.

- Scooby-Doo: Don Messick was the original voice of Scooby-Doo from 1969 until 1995. Hadley Kay performed the voice for the Johnny Bravo episodes "Bravo Dooby-Doo" and "'Twas the Night", as well as in commercials, in 1997. Scott Innes was the voice of Scooby-Doo from 1998 to 2002. Neil Fanning voiced Scooby-Doo in the live-action Warner Bros. theatrical films produced in 2002 and 2004. Frank Welker is the current voice of Scooby-Doo, having taken over the role from Innes in 2002, although Innes voiced the character in video game projects (including PC, DVD and board games), commercials and some toys until 2008. Dave Coulier (2005) and Seth Green (2007, 2012, 2018) voiced Scooby in the Robot Chicken parodies.
- Norville "Shaggy" Rogers: Casey Kasem was the original voice of Shaggy from 1969 until 1997. Billy West voiced Shaggy in Scooby-Doo on Zombie Island and Scooby-Doo: Behind the Scenes in 1998. Scott Innes voiced the character from 1999 to 2002 and he continued to voice Shaggy in video game projects (including PC, DVD and board games), commercials and some toys until 2009. Casey Kasem returned to the voice role in 2002 and continued as Shaggy until 2009. In 2006, Kasem continued to voice Shaggy only in the direct-to-video film series until 2009, while Scott Menville performed the voice of Shaggy in the 2006–08 CW series Shaggy & Scooby-Doo Get a Clue!. Matthew Lillard appeared as Shaggy in the live action 2002 and 2004 theatrical films, and took over as the voice of the animated character in 2010. He also voiced Shaggy in four stop-motion parody sketches for the Adult Swim show Robot Chicken. Nick Palatas appeared as Shaggy in the 2009 and 2010 live-action TV movies. Will Forte voices Shaggy as an adult with Iain Armitage voicing his younger self in the theatrical animated film Scoob!.
- Fred Jones: Frank Welker has always performed the voice of the animated versions of Fred since 1969, with the exception of the 1988–91 ABC series A Pup Named Scooby-Doo, where Carl Steven performed the voice of preteen Fred. Freddie Prinze Jr. appears as Fred in the live-action theatrical films and voiced the character in the Robot Chicken parodies. Robbie Amell played Fred in the live-action TV movies. Zac Efron voices Fred as an adult with Pierce Gagnon voicing his younger self in the theatrical animated film Scoob!.
- Daphne Blake: Stefanianna Christopherson was the voice of Daphne in the first season of Scooby-Doo, Where Are You! in 1969–70. Heather North assumed the role for season two in 1970, and continued as Daphne through 1997, save for Kellie Martin's turn as preteen Daphne in A Pup Named Scooby-Doo. Mary Kay Bergman performed the voice of Daphne from 1998 to 2000, with Grey DeLisle assuming the role. She continues to perform the role to this day. North reprised her voice role for two 2003 direct-to-video films, Scooby-Doo! and the Legend of the Vampire and Scooby-Doo! and the Monster of Mexico. Sarah Michelle Gellar appears as Daphne in the live-action theatrical films and as Daphne's voice in the Robot Chicken parodies. Kate Melton played Daphne in the live-action TV movies. Amanda Seyfried voices Daphne as an adult with Mckenna Grace voicing her younger self in the theatrical animated film Scoob!.
- Velma Dinkley: Nicole Jaffe was the original voice of Velma from 1969 to 1973. Pat Stevens assumed the role from 1976 to 1979, with Marla Frumkin taking over midseason on Scooby-Doo and Scrappy-Doo in the latter year. Frumkin returned to voice Velma on a recurring basis for The New Scooby-Doo Mysteries in 1984, and Christina Lange voiced preteen Velma in A Pup Named Scooby-Doo. B. J. Ward voiced Velma from 1997 to 2002, with Mindy Cohn assuming the role in 2002. As with North, Jaffe reprised her voice role for Scooby-Doo! and the Legend of the Vampire and Scooby-Doo! and the Monster of Mexico in 2003. Stephanie D'Abruzzo voiced Velma for the 2013 puppet film Scooby-Doo! Adventures: The Mystery Map. In 2015, Kate Micucci took on the role for the series Be Cool, Scooby-Doo! and Lego Scooby-Doo shorts and specials; in 2016 she took over the role from Cohn completely. Linda Cardellini appears as Velma in the live-action theatrical films and as the voice of Velma in the Robot Chicken parodies. Hayley Kiyoko played Velma in the live-action TV movies. Gina Rodriguez voices Velma as an adult with Ariana Greenblatt voicing her younger self in the theatrical animated film Scoob!.
- Scrappy-Doo: Lennie Weinrib voiced Scrappy-Doo during the first version of Scooby-Doo and Scrappy-Doo in 1979–80. Don Messick assumed the role in 1980 for the Scooby-Doo and Scrappy-Doo segments of The Richie Rich/Scooby-Doo Show and continued as Scrappy through 1988. Scrappy has only appeared sporadically since 1988, with Scott Innes performing the voice in the 2002 live-action film, which portrays Scrappy as the main villain, as well as in Cartoon Network bumpers, video games and toys since 1999. Dan Milano voiced Scrappy in a 2007 Robot Chicken sketch.

== Comic books ==
A 1968 Chevrolet Sportvan 108 painted to look like The Mystery Machine from Scooby-Doo. A number of Scooby fans have decorated vans in this fashion.

Gold Key Comics began publication of Scooby-Doo, Where Are You! comic books in March 1970. The comics initially contained adaptations of episodes of the television show drawn by Phil DeLara, Jack Manning and Warren Tufts. The comic books later moved to all-original stories until ending with issue #30 in 1974. Several of these issues were written by Mark Evanier and drawn by Dan Spiegle. Charlton published Scooby comics, many drawn by Bill Williams, for 11 issues in 1975. From 1977 to 1979, Marvel Comics published nine issues of Scooby-Doo, all written by Evanier and drawn by Spiegel. Harvey Comics published reprints of the Charlton comics, as well as a handful of special issues, between 1993 and 1994.

In 1995, Archie Comics began publishing a monthly Scooby-Doo comic book, the first year of which featured Scrappy-Doo among its cast. Evanier and Spiegel worked on three issues of the series, which ended after 21 issues in 1997 when Warner Bros.' DC Comics acquired the rights to publish comics based on Hanna-Barbera characters. DC's Scooby-Doo series continues publication to this day. In 2013, DC began a digital bi-monthly comic book titled Scooby-Doo Team-Up, crossing over Mystery Inc. with other DC and Hanna-Barbera characters. Since then, the series has become a monthly comic book available in print.

In 2004, a limited series of a 100 comic books called Scooby-Doo! World of Mystery was released. In each issue, Mystery Inc. go from country to country solving mysteries. Each issue came with a pack of exclusive cards, with 350 in total able to be collected.

In 2016, DC launched a new monthly comic book entitled Scooby Apocalypse, with the characters being reinvented in a story set in a post-apocalyptic world, where monsters roam the streets and Scooby and the gang must find a way to survive at all costs, while also trying to find a way to reverse the apocalypse.

== Merchandising ==
Early Scooby-Doo merchandise included a 1973 Milton Bradley board game, decorated lunch boxes, iron-on transfers, coloring books, story books, records, underwear, and other such goods. When Scrappy-Doo was introduced to the series in 1979, he, Scooby, and Shaggy became the foci of much of the merchandising, including a 1983 Milton-Bradley Scooby-Doo and Scrappy-Doo board game. The first Scooby-Doo video game appeared in arcades in 1986, and has been followed by a number of games for both home consoles and personal computers. Scooby-Doo multivitamins also debuted at this time, and have been manufactured by Bayer since 2001. Scooby-Doo merchandising tapered off during the late 1980s and early 1990s, but increased after the series' revival on Cartoon Network in 1995. Today, all manner of Scooby-Doo-branded products are available for purchase, including Scooby-Doo breakfast cereal, plush toys, action figures, car decorations, Barbie dolls from Mattel and much more. Real "Scooby Snacks" dog treats are produced by Del Monte Pet Products. Hasbro has created a number of Scooby board games, including a Scooby-themed edition of the popular mystery board game Clue. In 2007, the Pressman Toy Corporation released the board game Scooby-Doo! Haunted House. Beginning in 2001, a Scooby-Doo children's book series was authorized and published by Scholastic. These books, written by Suzanne Weyn, include original stories and adaptations of Scooby theatrical and direct-to-video features.

From 1990 to 2002, Shaggy and Scooby-Doo appeared as characters in the Funtastic World of Hanna-Barbera simulator ride at Universal Studios Florida. The ride was replaced in the early 2000s with a Jimmy Neutron attraction, and The Funtastic World of Hanna-Barbera instead became an attraction at several properties operated by Paramount Parks. Shaggy and Scooby-Doo are currently costumed characters at Universal Studios Florida, and can be seen driving the Mystery Machine around the park.

In 2001, Scooby-Doo in Stagefright, a live stage play based upon the series, began touring across the world. A follow-up, Scooby-Doo and the Pirate Ghost, followed in 2009.

The Mystery Machine has been used as the basis for many die-cast models and toys, such as from Hot Wheels.

The brand made $800 million in retail sales in 1999. In 2004, Scooby-Doo merchandise had generated $1 billion in retail sales Licensed merchandise also sold $496 million in 2015, $501 million in 2016, and $353 million in 2017.

=== Tabletop games ===
Title	Type	Manufacturer	Year
Scooby-Doo... Where Are You! Game	Board game	Milton Bradley	1973
Scooby-Doo.. och Monstret	Board game	Alga	1978
Scooby-Doo Game	Board game	Milton Bradley	1980
Scooby-Doo and Scrappy-Doo Game	Board game	Milton Bradley	1983
Clue: Scooby-Doo! Where Are You?	Board game	Parker Brothers	1999; 2019 (reprint)
Scooby-Doo! Thrills and Spills	Board game	Pressman Toy Corporation	1999
Scooby-Doo! Mystery Card Game	Card game	United States Playing Card Company	1999
Scooby-Doo! Betrayal at Mystery Mansion	Board game	Avalon Hill	2020
Scooby-Doo: Escape from the Haunted Mansion	Board game	USAopoly	2020

== Overview of television series ==
Series	Season	Series/ package	Episodes		Originally aired		
Series	Season	Series/ package	Episodes		Season premiere	Season finale	Network
1	1	Scooby-Doo, Where Are You!	17		September 13, 1969	January 17, 1970	CBS
1	2	Scooby-Doo, Where Are You!	8		September 12, 1970	October 31, 1970	CBS
2	1	The New Scooby-Doo Movies	16		September 9, 1972	December 23, 1972	CBS
2	2	The New Scooby-Doo Movies	8		September 8, 1973	October 27, 1973	CBS
3	1	The Scooby-Doo Show / The Scooby/Dynomutt Hour	16		September 11, 1976	December 18, 1976	ABC
3	2	The Scooby-Doo Show / All-Star Laff-A-Lympics	8		September 10, 1977	October 29, 1977	ABC
3	3	The Scooby-Doo Show / Where Are You!	16	9	September 9, 1978	November 4, 1978	ABC
3	3	The Scooby-Doo Show / All-Star Laff-A-Lympics	16	7	November 11, 1978	December 23, 1978	ABC
4	1	Scooby-Doo and Scrappy-Doo ('79)	16		September 22, 1979	January 5, 1980	ABC
5	1	Scooby-Doo and Scrappy-Doo ('80) / The Richie/Scooby Show	13		November 8, 1980	January 31, 1981	ABC
5	2	Scooby-Doo and Scrappy-Doo ('80) / The Richie/Scooby Show	7		September 19, 1981	October 31, 1981	ABC
5	3	Scooby-Doo and Scrappy-Doo ('80) / The Scooby & Scrappy/Puppy Hour	13		September 25, 1982	December 18, 1982	ABC
6	1	The New Scooby and Scrappy Show	13		September 10, 1983	December 10, 1983	ABC
6	2	The New Scooby and Scrappy Show / The New Scooby-Doo Mysteries	13		September 8, 1984	December 1, 1984	ABC
7	1	The 13 Ghosts of Scooby-Doo	13		September 7, 1985	December 7, 1985	ABC
8	1	A Pup Named Scooby-Doo	13		September 10, 1988	December 10, 1988	ABC
8	2	A Pup Named Scooby-Doo	8		September 9, 1989	November 4, 1989	ABC
8	3	A Pup Named Scooby-Doo	3		September 8, 1990	November 3, 1990	ABC
8	4	A Pup Named Scooby-Doo	3		August 3, 1991	August 17, 1991	ABC
9	1	What's New, Scooby-Doo?	14		September 14, 2002	March 22, 2003	The WB
9	2	What's New, Scooby-Doo?	14		September 13, 2003	March 27, 2004	The WB
9	3	What's New, Scooby-Doo?	14	13	January 29, 2005	April 16, 2006	The WB
9	3	What's New, Scooby-Doo?	14	1	July 21, 2006		Cartoon Network
10	1	Shaggy & Scooby-Doo Get a Clue!	13		September 23, 2006	May 5, 2007	The CW
10	2	Shaggy & Scooby-Doo Get a Clue!	13		September 22, 2007	March 15, 2008	The CW
11	1	Scooby-Doo! Mystery Incorporated	26		April 5, 2010	July 26, 2011	Cartoon Network
11	2	Scooby-Doo! Mystery Incorporated	26		July 30, 2012	April 5, 2013	Cartoon Network
12	1	Be Cool, Scooby-Doo!	26	20	October 5, 2015	March 12, 2016	Cartoon Network
12	1	Be Cool, Scooby-Doo!	26	6	June 20, 2017		Boomerang
12	2	Be Cool, Scooby-Doo!	26	15	September 28, 2017	December 22, 2017	Boomerang SVOD
12	2	Be Cool, Scooby-Doo!	26	11	March 8, 2018	March 18, 2018	Boomerang
13	1	Scooby-Doo and Guess Who?	26	13	June 27, 2019	September 19, 2019	Boomerang SVOD
13	1	Scooby-Doo and Guess Who?	26	13	July 2, 2020		Boomerang SVOD
13	2	Scooby-Doo and Guess Who?	26	15	October 1, 2020	February 25, 2021	Boomerang SVOD
13	2	Scooby-Doo and Guess Who?	26	11	October 1, 2021		HBO Max
14	1	Velma	10		January 12, 2023	February 9, 2023	HBO Max
14	2	Velma	11	10	April 25, 2024		Max
14	2	Velma	11	1	October 3, 2024		Max

== Reception and legacy ==
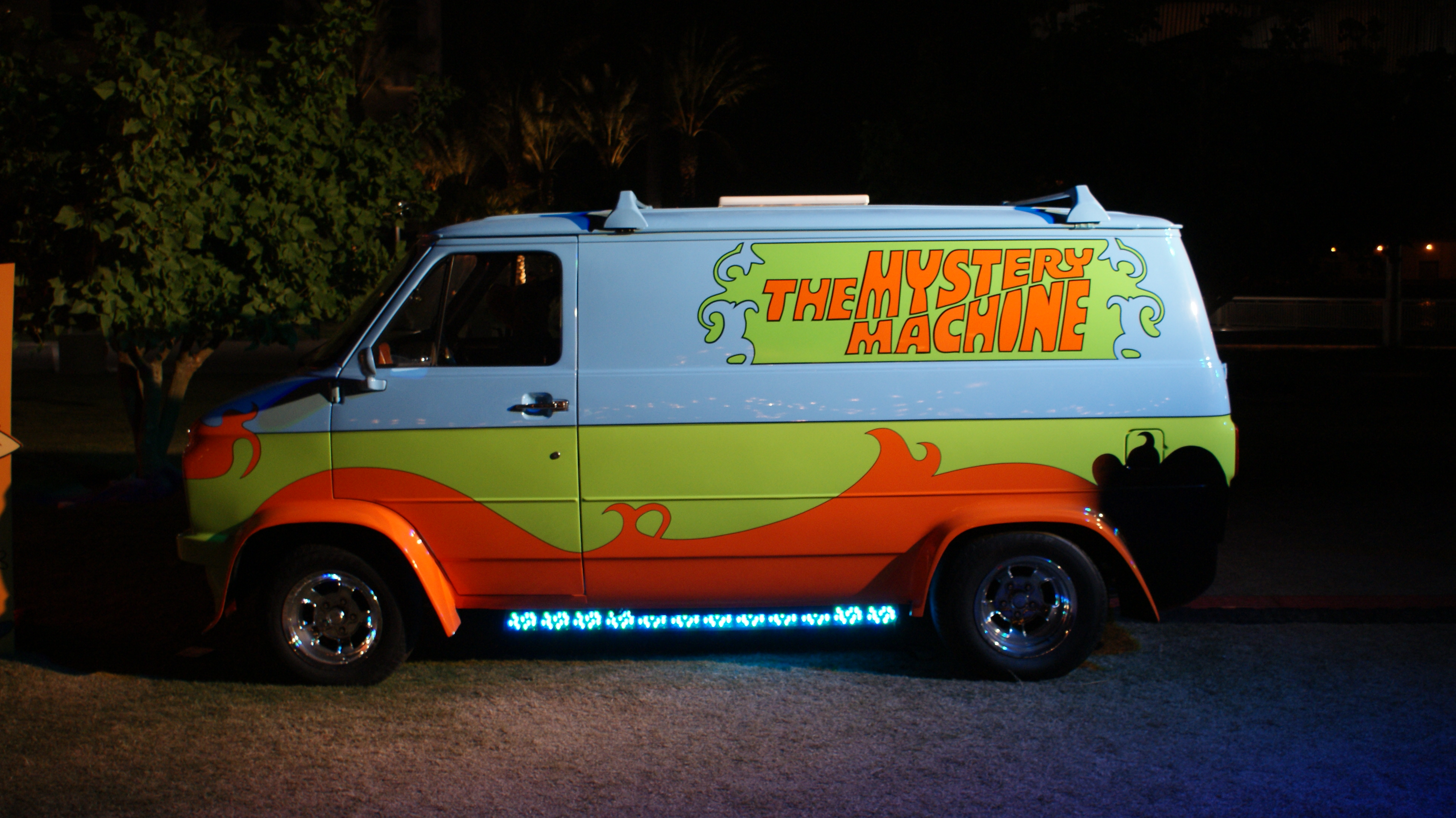
The Mystery Machine at San Diego Comic-Con in 2013

During its five-decade broadcast history, Scooby-Doo has received two Emmy nominations: a 1989 Daytime Emmy nomination for A Pup Named Scooby-Doo, and a 2003 Daytime Emmy nomination for What's New, Scooby-Doo's Mindy Cohn in the "Outstanding Performer in an Animated Program" category. Science advocate Carl Sagan favorably compared the predominantly skeptic oriented formula to that of most television dealing with paranormal themes, and considered that an adult analogue to Scooby-Doo would be a great public service.

Scooby-Doo has maintained a significant fan base, which has grown steadily since the 1990s due to the show's popularity among both young children and nostalgic adults who grew up with the series. Several television critics have stated that the show's mix of the comedy-adventure and horror genres was the reason for its widespread success. As Fred Silverman and the Hanna-Barbera staff had planned when they first began producing the series, Scooby-Doo's ghosts, monsters and spooky locales tend more towards humor than horror, making them easily accessible to younger children. "Overall, [Scooby-Doo is] just not a show that is going to overstimulate kids' emotions and tensions," offered American Center for Children and Media executive director David Kleeman in a 2002 interview. "It creates just enough fun to [avoid] getting them worried or giving them nightmares."

Older teenagers and adults have admitted to enjoying Scooby-Doo because of presumed subversive themes which involve theories of drug use and sexuality, in particular that Shaggy is assumed to be a user of cannabis and Velma is assumed to be a lesbian. Such themes were pervasive enough in popular culture to find their way into Warner Bros.' initial Scooby-Doo feature film in 2002, though several of the scenes were edited before release to secure a family-friendly "PG" rating. Series creators Joe Ruby and Ken Spears reported that they "took umbrage" to the inclusion of such themes in the Scooby-Doo feature and other places, and denied intending their characters to be drug users in any way.

Like many Hanna-Barbera shows, the early Scooby-Doo series have been criticized at times for their production values and storytelling. In 2002, Jamie Malanowski of The New York Times commented that "[Scooby-Doo's] mysteries are not very mysterious, and the humor is hardly humorous. As for the animation—well, the drawings on your refrigerator may give it competition."

By the 2000s, Scooby-Doo had received recognition for its popularity by placing in a number of top cartoon or top cartoon character polls. The August 3, 2002, issue of TV Guide featured its list of the 50 Greatest Cartoon Characters of All Time, in which Scooby-Doo placed twenty-second. Scooby also ranked thirteenth in Animal Planet's list of the 50 Greatest TV Animals. For one year from 2004 to 2005, Scooby-Doo held the Guinness World Record for having the most episodes of any animated television series ever produced, a record previously held by and later returned to The Simpsons. Scooby-Doo was published as holding this record in the 2006 edition of the Guinness Book of Records.

In January 2009, entertainment website IGN named Scooby-Doo #24 on its list of the Top 100 Best Animated TV Shows. Writing in 2020, Christopher Orr of The Atlantic queried why the franchise had remained popular for several decades, concluding that it was primarily due to the many differing ways in which the relationship between the main characters could be interpreted or used as a metaphor.

=== Accolades ===
Awards and nominations received by the Scooby-Doo franchise
Year	Title	Daytime Emmy Awards		Children's & Family Emmy Awards		Annie Awards	
Year	Title	Nominations	Wins	Nominations	Wins	Nominations	Wins
Animated Television Series
1990	A Pup Named Scooby-Doo	2					
2003	What's New, Scooby-Doo?	1					
2007	Shaggy & Scooby-Doo Get a Clue!	3					
2022	Scooby-Doo and Guess Who?			1			
Animated Special Projects
2000	The Scooby-Doo Project					1	1
Television and Direct-to-Video Animated Films
1999	Scooby-Doo on Zombie Island					1	
2000	Scooby-Doo and the Witch's Ghost					1	
2004	Scooby-Doo and the Loch Ness Monster					1	
Total		6		1		4	1

== In popular culture ==
As with most popular franchises, Scooby-Doo has been parodied and has done parodies.

- In concluding minutes of the 1992 film Wayne's World, protagonist Garth (Dana Carvey) suggests "Let's do the Scooby Doo ending". The film's primary antagonist, Benjamin Kane (Rob Lowe) is comically unmasked to reveal he is actually "Old Man Withers, the guy who runs the haunted amusement park." Withers had been very briefly introduced early in the film, only to go unseen and unmentioned during the rest of the plot. Restrained by police, Withers complains "I would have got away with it too, if it hadn't been for you snooping kids!".
- The cult television and comic book series Buffy the Vampire Slayer features a group of characters that refer to themselves as the "Scooby Gang", who similarly battle supernatural forces and solve supernatural monster mysteries. The show contains obvious influences of Scooby-Doo, where "The Scoobies" use books to look up monsters. Sarah Michelle Gellar, the actress who plays Buffy Summers on the series, later went on to appear as Daphne Blake in the live-action films Scooby-Doo and Scooby-Doo 2: Monsters Unleashed.
- Scooby-Doo and the Mystery Inc. gang (based on their classic 1972 incarnation as opposed to their more recent incarnations) appear in the second part of the Batman: The Brave and the Bold episode "Bat-Mite Presents: Batman's Strangest Cases" in which they team up with Batman and Robin to rescue Weird Al who was kidnapped by the Joker and the Penguin.
- Jay and Silent Bob Strike Back has a brief scene where the title characters hitch a ride in the Mystery Machine with Scooby and the gang.
- In October 1999, Cartoon Network made a Scooby-Doo spoof of The Blair Witch Project called The Scooby-Doo Project.
- The Venture Bros. episode "¡Viva los Muertos!" features a thinly parodied version of the gang as aging, gone-to-seed miscreants with the characters matched to corresponding serial killers and radical figures, e.g. Fred being mixed with Ted Bundy into the composite character "Ted".
- The series is parodied in the animated music video for the song "Ghost" by Mystery Skulls.
- The animated series Arthur has a parody of Scooby-Doo called "Spooky-Poo".
- In the South Park episode "Korn's Groovy Pirate Ghost Mystery", the nu metal band Korn, parodying Scooby and the gang, tackle an invasion of mysterious "Pirate Ghosts". They enlist the help of Stan Marsh, Kyle Broflovski, Eric Cartman and Kenny McCormick, and after they solve the mystery they perform "Falling Away from Me" from their album Issues.
- In the 2003 live-action/animated film Looney Tunes: Back in Action an animated Scooby-Doo and Shaggy Rogers (voiced by Frank Welker and Casey Kasem respectively) argued to Matthew Lillard over his portrayal of Shaggy in the 2002 live-action film and threatens to "come after" him if he screws up in the sequel.
- The gang was featured in Harvey Birdman, Attorney at Law where the title character defends Shaggy and Scooby against possession charges in the 2002 episode "Shaggy Busted".
- After defeating and capturing a pirate crew in the role playing video game Golden Sun: The Lost Age, one of the imprisoned pirates declares that, "Everything would have been fine if it hadn't been for you meddling kids!"
- In the Teen Titans Go! episode "The Cruel Giggling Ghoul", each Titan assumes the role of a Scooby Gang member (with Beast Boy as Scooby) to investigate a mystery at a spooky amusement park, with the help of LeBron James. The Scooby Gang later appears in the crossover episode "Cartoon Feud", where Control Freak forces them to compete in Family Feud. The Scooby Gang later appears in the episodes "Intro", "Warner Bros. 100th Anniversary" and "Favorite Animated Show Nominee".
- The novel Meddling Kids (2017) by Edgar Cantero parodies not only Scooby-Doo, but also teen-detective dramas (such as the Hardy Boys, Nancy Drew, and the Famous Five) in general.
- The CW's television series Supernatural crossed over with the Scooby-Doo franchise in the episode Scoobynatural, which aired March 29, 2018. The animated collaboration featured the three main characters of Supernatural (Sam, Dean, and Castiel) along with Scooby and the gang as they team up to solve a supernatural mystery.
- Velma made a cameo appearance in The Lego Movie 2: The Second Part, voiced by Trisha Gum.
- The Harvey Street Kids episode "Crush 4U, Where RU?" fully references the Scooby-Doo series, especially the title.
- Scooby-Doo and the gang appear in the 2021 live-action/animated film Space Jam: A New Legacy. Their design is the same from 2020 animated film Scoob! They appear among the other Warner Bros. characters in the film.
- Scooby-Doo and Shaggy both appeared in "The Official BBC Children in Need Medley" in 2009.
- In the Black Mirror episode "Loch Henry", a character sings a line from the opening theme of Scooby-Doo, Where Are You! when investigating a cellar where murders had taken place.
- The term "Don't have a Scooby" is recognised rhyming slang for "clue".
- The Scooby Gang appeared in the Jellystone! third-season episode "Frankenhooky". They tie up the Ghost Chasers with a rope before unmasking them to reveal Sooey Pig, Orful Octopus, and Magic Rabbit of the Really Rottens. The Scooby Gang are revealed to actually be Cindy Bear, Ranger Smith, Hardy Har Har, Tubb, and a cotton ball in a jar.
- UK band, The Chrysanthemums, released the album Decoy for a Dognapper in 2022. It is a concept album, loosely based on the Scooby-Doo episode that it takes its title from.
- The Scooby gang appeared in Fortnite during the 2025 Fortnitemares event from October 9–31. Each member was available as skins, and the Mystery Machine was available as a vehicle.

== See also ==
- Hanna-Barbera Educational Filmstrips
- List of works produced by Hanna-Barbera Productions
- Lost Mysteries
- Scooby-Doo's Snack Tracks: The Ultimate Collection
- Scoubidou
