= Scooby-Doo's Snack Tracks: The Ultimate Collection =

Soundtrack album by Various Artists
- Released: September 15, 1998
- Recorded: 1969–1985, 1998
- Genres: Bubblegum pop, Techno
- Length: 33:34
- Label: Kid Rhino
- Producers: Joseph Barbera; Craig Bartock; Craig DeGraff; William Hanna

Scooby-Doo's Snack Tracks: The Ultimate Collection is the first and only soundtrack to the popular Hanna-Barbera Saturday morning cartoon franchise Scooby-Doo. The soundtrack consist of songs and theme songs from the incarnations produced from 1969 to 1985, from Scooby-Doo, Where Are You! to The 13 Ghosts of Scooby-Doo. Three songs, "Move Over", "Ruby Cool Guy" and "Gotta Have Time", were taken from the 1979 animated telefilm Scooby Goes Hollywood. A bonus track, called "Scooby's Mystery Mix", takes a majority of the sound bites included on the soundtrack as a musical mix. The sound bites featured on the soundtrack were taken primarily from the second season of Scooby-Doo, Where Are You!, but also from a few episodes of The New Scooby-Doo Movies, and features the entire cast from both series. Two guest stars from The New Scooby-Doo Movies, Jerry Reed and Davy Jones, appeared on the soundtrack singing the songs they performed in their guest-appearance episodes. The soundtrack was released on CD and cassette tape on September 15, 1998. It was later discontinued.

The album peaked at number five on the Billboard Kids Album chart.

== Critical reception ==
Professional ratings
Review scores
Source	Rating
Allmusic	3/5 stars

Jason Ankeny of Allmusic gave a mixed review of the soundtrack. He praised the songs from the Scooby-Doo, Where Are You! (1969–1970) series stating that the songs are "pleasantly kitschy bubblegum confections". Ankeny stated that the inclusion of later theme songs were "far less engaging" and that the songs by Jerry Reed and Davy Jones, as well as the song "Me and My Shadow", ranged "from the harmless to the tedious" and that the bonus remix, "Scooby's Mystery Mix", was "a lame techno remix." The album was rated three out of five stars.

== Track listing ==
No.	Title	Writer(s)	Recording artist(s)	Length
1.	"Scooby-Doo, Where Are You!" (Main Title, 1969)	David Mook; Ben Raleigh	Larry Marks	1:12
2.	"Recipe for My Love"	Danny Janssen	Austin Roberts	2:31
3.	"Seven Days a Week"	Janssen; Roberts	Roberts	2:32
4.	"Daydreamin'"	Janssen; Sue Steward	Roberts	2:02
5.	"Love the World"	Janssen	Roberts	2:22
6.	"Tell Me, Tell Me"	Janssen; Steward	Roberts	2:09
7.	"The New Scooby-Doo Movies" (Main Title, 1972)	Joseph Barbera; Hoyt Curtin; William Hanna	Cast	1:28
8.	"Pretty Mary Sunlite"	Janssen; Roberts	Jerry Reed	2:13
9.	"I Can Make You Happy"	Janssen; Steward	Davy Jones	2:01
10.	"The Scooby-Doo Show" (Main Title, 1976)	Barbera; Curtin; Hanna		1:27
11.	"Move Over"	Barbera; Curtin; Hanna	Casey Kasem; Don Messick	1:24
12.	"Ruby Cool Guy"	Barbera; Curtin; Hanna	Frank Welker; Messick	2:14
13.	"Gotta Have Time"	Barbera; Curtin; Hanna	Marilyn Schreffler; Messick	1:39
14.	"The New Scooby-Doo Mysteries" (Main Title, 1984)	Barbera; Curtin; Hanna; Ron Jones		0:59
15.	"I Could Be a Star"	Barbera; Curtin; Hanna	Pat Fraley; Kasey; Messick	1:13
16.	"Dooby Doo"	Barbera; Curtin; Hanna	Danny Goldman	0:52
17.	"The 13 Ghosts of Scooby-Doo" (Main Title, 1985)	Barbera; Curtin; Hanna; Jones	Kasem; Messick; Vincent Price; Arte Johnson; Howard Morris; Heather North	1:02
18.	"Me and My Shadow"	Al Jolson; Billy Rose; Dave Dreyer	Messick	1:12
19.	"Scooby's Mystery Mix" (Bonus track)	Craig DeGraff; E.J. Dick	Marks; Roberts; Cast	3:02
Total length:				33:34

== Personnel ==
Credits for Scooby-Doo's Snack Tracks: The Ultimate Collection were adapted from Allmusic.

- Joseph Barbera – director, producer
- Craig Bartock – producer
- Bodie Chandler – director
- Craig DeGraff – producer
- Dave Dreyer – composer
- Bob Fisher – mastering
- William Hanna - director, producer
- Scott Innes – liner notes
- Nicole Jaffe - voices (Velma Dinkley)
- Arte Johnson – voices
- Al Jolson – composer
- Davy Jones – performer
- Casey Kasem – voices (Shaggy Rogers)
- Don Messick – voices (Scooby-Doo)
- Howard Morris – voices
- Heather North - voices (Daphne Blake)
- Vincent Price – voices (Vincent Van Ghoul)
- Jerry Reed – performer
- Billy Rose – composer
- Maria Villar – design
- Frank Welker – voices (Fred Jones, Groove)

== Charts ==
Chart (1998–99)	Peak position
Kids Album (Billboard)	5

== See also ==
- Scooby-Doo
- Scooby-Doo (disambiguation)
