= Scooby-Doo and Scrappy-Doo (1980 TV series) =

- Genre: Adventure; Comedy
- Created by: Joe Ruby; Ken Spears
- Starring: Don Messick; Casey Kasem; Frank Welker
- Country of origin: United States
- Original language: English
- No. of seasons: 3
- No. of episodes: 33 (99 shorts)

Production
- Executive producers: William Hanna; Joseph Barbera; Joe Ruby (1982); Ken Spears (1982)
- Producer: Don Jurwich (1980–81)
- Running time: 21 minutes (7 minutes per segments)
- Production companies: Hanna-Barbera Productions; Ruby-Spears Enterprises

Original release
- Network: ABC
- Release: November 8, 1980 – December 18, 1982

Related
- Scooby-Doo and Scrappy-Doo (1979–80); The New Scooby and Scrappy-Doo Show / The New Scooby-Doo Mysteries (1983–84)

The Scooby-Doo and Scrappy-Doo shorts represent the fifth incarnation of the Scooby-Doo franchise.

The original format of four teenagers and their dog(s) solving faux-supernatural mysteries for a half-hour was eschewed for simpler, more comedic adventures that involve real supernatural villains (the villains in previous Scooby episodes were almost always regular humans in disguise).

A total of 33 half-hour episodes, each of which included three 7-minute shorts, were produced over three seasons, from 1980 to 1982 on ABC. Thirteen episodes were produced for the 1980–81 season, and seven more for the 1981–82 as segments of The Richie Rich/Scooby-Doo Show. The remaining thirteen episodes were produced as segments of The Scooby & Scrappy-Doo/Puppy Hour for the 1982–83 season. Out of the 99 shorts that were produced, 86 of them feature Scooby-Doo, his nephew Scrappy-Doo and Shaggy without the rest of the Mystery Inc gang, and the other 13 only feature Scrappy-Doo and Yabba-Doo.

== Cast ==
- Don Messick – Scooby-Doo, Scrappy-Doo, Yabba-Doo (1982)
- Casey Kasem – Norville "Shaggy" Rogers
- Frank Welker – Deputy Dusty (1982)

== Episodes ==
The following guide only includes 30 minute Scooby-Doo segments from each show. It does not include other series from the original broadcast package shows.

=== Season 1 (The Richie Rich/Scooby-Doo Show) (1980–81) ===
The following ran from 1980 to 1981, as segments on The Richie Rich/Scooby-Doo Show. That show, and the rest of the new 1980 ABC Saturday morning lineup, did not debut until November 8 (instead of the traditional first or second week of September) because of a voice actors' strike.

No. and episode title	Original airdate
1.1: "A Close Encounter with a Strange Kind"; 1.2: "A Fit Night Out for Bats"; 1.3: "The Chinese Food Factory"	November 8, 1980
1.4: "Scooby's Desert Dilemma"; 1.5: "The Old Cat and Mouse Game"; 1.6: "Stow-Aways"	November 15, 1980
1.7: "Mummy's the Word"; 1.8: "Hang in There, Scooby"; 1.9: "Stuntman Scooby"	November 22, 1980
1.10: "Scooby's Three Ding-A-Ling Circus"; 1.11: "Scooby's Fantastic Island"; 1.12: "Long John Scrappy"	November 29, 1980
1.13: "Scooby's Bull Fright"; 1.14: "Scooby Ghosts West"; 1.15: "A Bungle in the Jungle"	December 6, 1980
1.16: "Scooby's Fun Zone"; 1.17: "Swamp Witch"; 1.18: "Sir Scooby and the Black Knight"	December 13, 1980
1.19: "Waxworld"; 1.20: "Scooby in Wonderland"; 1.21: "Scrappy's Birthday"	December 20, 1980
1.22: "South Seas Scare"; 1.23: "Scooby's Swiss Miss"; 1.24: "Alaskan King Coward"	December 27, 1980
1.25: "Et Tu, Scoob?"; 1.26: "Soggy Bog Scooby"; 1.27: "Scooby Gumbo"	January 3, 1981
1.28: "Way Out Scooby"; 1.29: "Strongman Scooby"; 1.30: "Moonlight Madness"	January 10, 1981
1.31: "Dog Tag Scooby"; 1.32: "Scooby at the Center of the World"; 1.33: "Scooby's Trip to Ahz"	January 17, 1981
1.34: "A Fright at the Opera"; 1.35: "Robot Ranch"; 1.36: "Surprised Spies"	January 24, 1981
1.37: "The Invasion of the Scooby Snatchers"; 1.38: "Scooby Dooby Guru"; 1.39: "Scooby and the Bandit"	January 31, 1981

=== Season 2 (The Richie Rich/Scooby-Doo Show) (1981) ===
The following ran in 1981, as segments on The Richie Rich/Scooby-Doo Show.

No. and episode title	Original airdate
2.40: "Scooby Nocchio"; 2.41: "Lighthouse Keeper Scooby"; 2.42: "Scooby's Roots"	September 19, 1981
2.43: "Scooby's Escape from Atlantis"; 2.44: "Excalibur Scooby"; 2.45: "Scooby Saves the World"	September 26, 1981
2.46: "Scooby Dooby Goo"; 2.47: "Rickshaw Scooby"; 2.48: "Scooby's Luck of the Irish"	October 3, 1981
2.49: "Backstage Scooby"; 2.50: "Scooby's House of Mystery"; 2.51: "Sweet Dreams Scooby"	October 10, 1981
2.52: "Scooby-Doo 2000"; 2.53: "Punk Rock Scooby"; 2.54: "Canine to Five"	October 17, 1981
2.55: "Hard Hat Scooby"; 2.56: "Hothouse Scooby"; 2.57: "Pigskin Scooby": Scooby and Scrappy tackle dogs in a football game.	October 24, 1981
2.58: "Sopwith Scooby"; 2.59: "Tenderbigfoot": Scooby and Scrappy confront Bigfoot. 2.60: "Scooby and the Beanstalk": Scooby and Scrappy climb a magical beanstalk.	October 31, 1981

Following the final first-run episode on October 31, reruns from the first seasons were rerun alongside episodes from the second season.

=== Season 3 (The Scooby & Scrappy-Doo/Puppy Hour) (1982) ===
The following ran in 1982, as segments of The Scooby & Scrappy-Doo/Puppy Hour. All segments were written and storyboarded at Hanna-Barbera, but were produced and animated by then-sister company Ruby-Spears Enterprises. Note: The third episode for each air date listed is the Scrappy and Yabba-Doo episode from that date.

No. and episode title	Original airdate
3.61: "The Maltese Mackerel"; 3.62: "Dumb Waiter Caper"; 3.63: "Yabba's Rustle Hustle"	September 25, 1982
3.64: "The Catfish Burglar Caper"; 3.65: "Movie Monster Menace"; 3.66: "Mine Your Own Business"	October 2, 1982
3.67: "Super Teen Shaggy"; 3.68: "Basketball Bumblers"; 3.69: "Tragic Magic"	October 9, 1982
3.70: "Beauty Contest Caper"; 3.71: "Stakeout at the Takeout"; 3.72: "Runaway Scrappy"	October 16, 1982
3.73: "Who's Scooby-Doo?"; 3.74: "Double Trouble Date"; 3.75: "Slippery Dan the Escape Man"	October 23, 1982
3.76: "Cable Car Caper"; 3.77: "Muscle Trouble"; 3.78: "Low-Down Showdown"	October 30, 1982
3.79: "Comic Book Caper"; 3.80: "Misfortune Teller"; 3.81: "Vild Vest Vampire"	November 6, 1982
3.82: "A Gem of a Case"; 3.83: "From Bad to Curse"; 3.84: "Tumbleweed Derby"	November 13, 1982
3.85: "Disappearing Car Caper"; 3.86: "Scooby-Doo and Genie-Poo"; 3.87: "Law and Disorder"	November 20, 1982
3.88: "Close Encounter of the Worst Kind"; 3.89: "Captain Canine Caper"; 3.90: "Alien Schmalien"	November 27, 1982
3.91: "The Incredible Cat Lady Caper"; 3.92: "Picnic Poopers"; 3.93: "Go East, Young Pardner"	December 4, 1982
3.94: "One Million Years Before Lunch"; 3.95: "Where's the Werewolf?"; 3.96: "Up a Crazy River"	December 11, 1982
3.97: "Hoedown Showdown"; 3.98: "Snow Job Too Small"; 3.99: "Bride and Gloom"	December 18, 1982

== Home media ==
Warner Home Video (via Hanna-Barbera and Warner Bros. Family Entertainment) released The Richie Rich/Scooby-Doo Show: Volume 1 on DVD in Region 1 on May 20, 2008.

DVD name	Episodes	Release date
The Richie Rich/Scooby-Doo Show: Volume 1	First 7 episodes	May 20, 2008; October 3, 2017 (re-release)
13 Spooky Tales Around the World	"Moonlight Madness"	May 15, 2012
13 Spooky Tales: Holiday Chills and Thrills	1. "Tenderbigfoot"; 2. "Snow Job Too Small"	October 16, 2012
Scooby-Doo! Mask of the Blue Falcon	"Comic Book Caper"	February 26, 2013
13 Spooky Tales: Run for Your Rife	"Snow Job Too Small"	September 10, 2013
13 Spooky Tales: Ruh Roh Robot!	1. "Way Out Scooby"; 2. "Who's Scooby-Doo?"; 3. "Disappearing Car Caper"	September 24, 2013
13 Spooky Tales: For the Love of Snack	1. "Scooby's Swiss Miss"; 2. "Et Tu, Scoob?"; 3. "Soggy Bog Scooby"; 4. "South Seas Scare"; 5. "Scooby Gumbo"; 6. "Alaskan King Coward"; 7. "Hothouse Scooby"; 8. "Scooby Doo 2000"; 9. "Punk Rock Scooby"	January 7, 2014
13 Spooky Tales: Field of Screams	1. "Basketball Bumblers"; 2. "Maltese Mackerel"; 3. "Yabba's Rustle Hustle"; 4. "Picnic Poopers"; 5. "Muscle Trouble"; 6. "Alien Schmalien"	May 13, 2014
13 Spooky Tales: Surf's Up Scooby-Doo!	1. "Scooby Nocchio"; 2. "Scooby's Roots"; 3. "Lighthouse Keeper Scooby"; 4. "Excalibur Scooby"; 5. "Scooby's Luck of the Irish"; 6. "Scooby's Escape from Atlantis"; 7. "Hang in There, Scooby	May 5, 2015

All three seasons are available for download from the iTunes store.
