= Ron Jones (composer) =

American composer (born 1954)

Ronald Neal Jones (born July 7, 1954) is an American composer. He has composed music for various television shows like Star Trek: The Next Generation, DuckTales, American Dad!, and Family Guy. Along with the creator of The Fairly OddParents, Butch Hartman, he composed the show's theme song and music for its episodes. He currently resides in Stanwood, Washington, where he owns Sky Muse studios, a recording facility designed for music recording and post-production.

== Early life ==
Jones was born in Kansas City, Kansas. He, along with his younger brother David, founded the Oregon Crusaders Drum and Bugle Corps in 1971, where Ron served as the composer, arranger, and drill designer. After completing his degree in music composition and music theory, he moved to Los Angeles to pursue further education at the Dick Grove School of Music. Jones studied under the guidance of Academy and Emmy Award-nominated composer Lalo Schifrin, who asked him to copy a concerto for guitar and orchestra.

== Early career ==
While attending Dick Grove, Jones composed a movie for NBC and began writing music for a television series produced by Hanna-Barbera. He also arranged and composed the theme songs of The Smurfs and The Snorks. Ron later joined the composing team of Mike Post and Pete Carpenter, where he worked on various popular television series such as The A-Team, Magnum, P.I., and Hardcastle and McCormick. In 1987, he was recruited by Disney Music President Chris Montan to compose music for Disney's first syndicated cartoon series, DuckTales.

== Star Trek: The Next Generation ==
Jones composed the music for 42 episodes of Star Trek: The Next Generation during the first four seasons (1987–1991). However, at the beginning of the fourth season, the producers decided to replace Jones with other composers. Jones has since been a vocal critic of Rick Berman-era Star Trek and has stated that the music in the subsequent spin-offs is less melodic and more electronic in nature. He once stated in an interview that he believed the theme for the series Enterprise would have been more suitable for the opening ceremonies of the WNBA.

== Family Guy ==
Jones composed music for the first 12 seasons (1999–2014) of Family Guy. Jones, with various other music and lyric collaborators, has received four Emmy nominations for his work on this series: Outstanding Original Music and Lyrics in 2000 ("This House Is Freakin' Sweet", from "Peter, Peter, Caviar Eater") and 2011 ("Christmastime Is Killing Us", from "Road to the North Pole"); Outstanding Music Composition for a Series in 2008 ("Lois Kills Stewie") and 2011 ("Road to the North Pole"). His collaborative work on the series also earned a Grammy nomination for 2012's Best Song Written for a Visual Media ("Christmastime is Killing Us").

For the two-part episodes of "Stewie Kills Lois and Lois Kills Stewie", Jones paid homage to his own music from a Star Trek: The Next Generation two-part episode, "The Best of Both Worlds", and used parodies of two cues. The piece which originally appeared when Locutus of Borg first appears is reused when Lois reappears in "Lois Kills Stewie". These parodied cues are available on Jones' website.

== Awards ==
- 2003 BMI Film and TV Awards: Main Title Theme
- 2002 BMI Film and TV Awards: Main Title Theme
- 1991 NAIRD Award: Best Soundtrack Album of the Year
- 1988 Emmy Awards: Outstanding Sound Mixing for a Drama Series (contributions)

== Television scores ==
- DuckTales (1987–1988), Disney Television Animation
- Star Trek: The Next Generation (1987–1991), Paramount Domestic Television
- Superman (1988), Ruby-Spears
- Family Guy (1999–2014), Fox Broadcasting Company
- The Fairly OddParents (theme song) (2001–2017), Nickelodeon/Frederator Studios
- American Dad! (2005–2009, left to focus on Family Guy, replaced by Joel McNeely), Fox Broadcasting Company

== Selected discography ==
- Star Trek - The Next Generation: Music from the Original Television Soundtrack, Volume Two (The Best of Both Worlds) (GNP Crescendo)
- "Star Trek: The Next Generation - The Ron Jones Project (1987–1999)" released by Film Score Monthly.
- "Superman" (1988 Hanna-Barbera animated series), disc 7 of Superman: The Music (1978–1988), released by Film Score Monthly.
- The Best of Star Trek: 30th Anniversary Special (tracks 6 & 7: Suite from "Heart of Glory") (GNP Crescendo)
- Scooby-Doo's Snack Tracks: The Ultimate Collection (two tracks)
