= The Richie Rich/Scooby-Doo Show =

1980 American animated TV show

- Also known as: The Richie Rich/Scooby-Doo Show (And Scrappy Too!)
- Created by: Joe Ruby (Scooby-Doo); Ken Spears (Scooby-Doo); Mark Evanier (Scrappy-Doo); Alfred Harvey (Richie Rich); Warren Kremer (Richie Rich)
- Written by: Mark Evanier; Bob Ogle; John Bradford; John Dunn; Paul Haggis; Joan Mauler; Michael Mauler; Norman Mauler; Tom Yakutis; Earl Kress
- Directed by: Ray Patterson (1980); George Gordon; Rudy Zamora (1981); Carl Urbano (1981)
- Creative directors: John Dunn; Jan Green; Gary Hoffman; Cullen Houghtaling; Emilie Kong; Bob Ogle; Dick Sebast; Don Sheppard; Howard Swift; Roy Wilson
- Voices of: Dick Beals; Bill Callaway; Nancy Cartwright; Joan Gerber; Christian Hoff; Joyce Jameson; Stanley Jones; Casey Kasem; Sparky Marcus; Don Messick; Marilyn Schreffler; Frank Welker
- Composer: Hoyt Curtin
- Country of origin: United States
- Original language: English
- No. of seasons: 2
- No. of episodes: 21

Production
- Executive producers: William Hanna; Joseph Barbera
- Producers: Don Jurwich (1980); Oscar Dufau (1981)
- Running time: 60 minutes
- Production company: Hanna-Barbera Productions

Original release
- Network: ABC
- Release: November 8, 1980 – November 7, 1981

Related
- The Pac-Man/Little Rascals/Richie Rich Show (Richie Rich); The Scooby & Scrappy-Doo/Puppy Hour (Scooby Doo!); Richie Rich; Scooby-Doo and Scrappy-Doo

The Richie Rich/Scooby-Doo Show is a 60-minute Saturday morning animated package show produced by Hanna-Barbera Productions and broadcast on ABC from November 8, 1980, to November 7, 1981. The program contained segments of Scooby-Doo and Scrappy-Doo and Richie Rich. The Scooby-Doo and Scrappy-Doo shorts represents the sixth show in which Scooby-Doo appears. This was the only Hanna-Barbera package series for which Scooby-Doo was given second billing and was also notable for Richie Rich's debut in animation.

== Episodes ==
With the exception of the Richie Rich Gems, each episode featured three Scooby-Doo segments and three Richie Rich segments between them. The episodes that contain Scooby-Doo cartoon segments that are repeats from earlier episodes are noted in the following list with "rr" used to indicate where a previously aired cartoon was rerun.

=== Season 1 (1980–81) ===
1. "A Close Encounter With A Strange Kind" / "The Robotnappers" / "A Fit Night Out For Bats" / "Piggy Bank Prank" / "The Chinese Food Factory" / "Muscle Beach" (November 8, 1980)
2. "Scooby's Desert Dilemma" / "The Rare Scare" / "The Old Cat and Mouse Game" / "Kitty Sitter" / "Stowaways" / "One of Our Aircraft Carriers is Missing" (November 15, 1980)
3. "Mummy's the Word" / "Silence is Golden" / "Hang in There, Scooby" / "The Shocking Lady Strikes Again" / "Stuntman Scooby" / "Spring Cleaning" (November 22, 1980)
4. "Scooby's Ding-A-Ling Circus" / "The Kangaroo Hop" / "Scooby's Fantastic Island" / "Cur Wash" / "Long John Scrappy" / "The Blur" (November 29, 1980)
5. "Scooby's Bull Fright" / "Irona Versus Demona" / "Scooby Ghosts West" / "Chef's Surprise" / "A Bungle in the Jungle" / "The Snow Bounders" (December 6, 1980)
6. "Scooby's Fun Zone" / "The Abominable Snow Plan" / "Swamp Witch" / "Miss Robot America" / "Sir Scooby and the Black Knight" / "Constructo" (December 13, 1980)
7. "Waxworld" / "The Greatest Invention in the World" / "Scooby in Wonderland" / "Who's Afraid of the Big Bad Bug" / "Scrappy's Birthday" / "Counterfeit Dollar" (December 20, 1980)
8. "South Seas Scare" / "Mystery Mountain" / "Scooby's Swiss Miss" / "Poor Little Richbillies" / "Alaskan King Coward" / "Chowhound" (December 27, 1980)
9. "Et Tu, Scoob?" / "Wiped Out" / "Soggy Bog Scooby" / "Welcome Uncle Cautious" / "Scooby Gumbo" / "Disaster Master" (January 3, 1981)
10. "Way Out Scooby" / "T.V. Dollar" / "Strongman Scooby" / "Disappearing Dignitaries" / "Moonlight Madness" / "The Most Unforgettable Butler" (January 10, 1981)
11. "Dog Tag Scooby" / "Prankster Beware" / "Scooby at the Center of the World" / "Clothes Make the Butler" / "Scooby's Trip to Ahz" / "Phantom of the Movies" (January 17, 1981)
12. "A Fright At the Opera" / "Cave Boy Richie" / "Robot Ranch" / "Young Irona" / "Surprised Spies" / "The Great Charity Train Robbery" (January 24, 1981)
13. "The Invasion of the Scooby Snatchers" / "Baseball Dollar" / "Scooby Dooby Guru" / "The Sinsiter Sports Spectacular" / "Scooby and the Bandit" / "It's No Giggling Matter" (January 31, 1981)

=== Season 2 (1981) ===
1. "Scooby Nocchio" / "Space Shark" / "Lighthouse Keeper Scooby" / "The Chef's Watch Dog" / "Scooby's Roots" / "Schoolhouse Romp" (September 19, 1981)
2. "Scooby's Escape From Atlantis" / "Richie of the Round Table" / "Excalibur Scooby" / "I Want My Mummy" / "Scooby Saves the World" / "Canine Cadet" (September 26, 1981)
3. "Scooby Dooby Goo" / "Voodoo Island" / "Rickshaw Scooby" / "Tooth is Stranger than Fiction" / "Scooby's Luck of the Irish" / "Butlering Made Easy" (October 3, 1981)
4. "Backstage Scooby" / "A Special Talent" / "Scooby's House of Mystery" / "Villains Incorporated" / "Sweet Dreams Scooby" / "Bye-Bye Baby" (October 10, 1981)
5. "Scooby-Doo 2000" / "Rich Mice" / "Punk Rock Scooby" / "King Bee" / "Canine to Five" / "Chilly Dog" (October 17, 1981)
6. "Hardhat Scooby" / "Money Talks" / "Hothouse Scooby" / "Mischief Movie" / "Pigskin Scooby" / "An Ordinary Day" (October 24, 1981)
7. "Sopwith Scooby" / "Dog Gone" / "Tenderbigfoot" / "Carnival Man" / "Scooby and the Beanstalk" / "The Day the Estate Stood Still" (October 31, 1981)
8. "rr" / "Around the World on Eighty Cents" / "rr" / "No Substitute for a Watch Dog" / "rr" / "Robot Robber" (November 7, 1981)

== Cast ==
- Sparky Marcus – Richie Rich
- Don Messick – Scooby-Doo, Scrappy-Doo
- Casey Kasem – Norville "Shaggy" Rogers
- Christian Hoff – Pee Wee, Freckles
- Dick Beals – Reggie Van Dough
- Bill Callaway – Professor Keanbean, Chef Pierre
- Nancy Cartwright – Gloria Glad
- Frank Welker – Dollar the Dog, Dr. Blemish, Suavo
- Joan Gerber – Irona the Robot Maid, Mrs. Rich
- Stanley Jones – Mr. Rich, Cadbury the Butler
- Robert Ridgely – Collector

== Home media ==
On May 20, 2008, Warner Home Video (via Hanna-Barbera and Warner Bros. Family Entertainment) released The Richie Rich/Scooby-Doo Show: Volume 1 on DVD for the Hanna-Barbera Classic Collection Region 1 for the first time. It features animated cartoons from the first seven episodes. The segment order is altered from the original air-date order. It is unknown when Warner Home Video will plan to release Volume 2 of the first season and the remainder of the second season of the show on DVD.

DVD name	No. of episodes	Release date
The Richie Rich/Scooby-Doo Show: Volume 1	7	May 20, 2008; October 3, 2017 (re-release)
