= List of A Pup Named Scooby-Doo episodes =

The following contains a list of episodes from the American animated television series A Pup Named Scooby-Doo which ran on ABC from 1988 until 1991. This is the eighth incarnation of the long-running Scooby-Doo Saturday morning series following the "Scooby-Doo Detective Agency's" adventures as adolescents.

Twenty-seven episodes were aired on ABC across four seasons from September 10, 1988 to August 17, 1991.

== Series overview ==
Season	Episodes	Originally released	
Season	Episodes	First released	Last released
1	13	September 10, 1988	December 10, 1988
2	8	September 9, 1989	November 4, 1989
3	3	September 8, 1990	November 3, 1990
4	3	August 3, 1991	August 17, 1991

== Episodes ==
=== Season 1 (1988) ===
The only season of the series to use digital ink and paint. With thirteen episodes, it was the longest of the four seasons.

No. overall	No. in season	Title	Written by	Original release date
1	1	"A Bicycle Built for Boo!"	Tom Ruegger, Jim Ryan, and Charles M. Howell, IV	September 10, 1988
The gang takes Shaggy's case when his paper-route bicycle is stolen by a ghost. Villain(s): The Green Ghost; Identity(ies): Mr. Conrad, publisher of the Daily Babbler tabloid and Shaggy's boss Reason(s): He needed the bicycle's chain for his printing press used in his counterfeiting scheme.
2	2	"The Sludge Monster from the Earth's Core"	Story by : Tom Ruegger; Teleplay by : Mary Jo Ludin	September 17, 1988
A monster that had recently robbed the Coolsville Last National Bank is haunting Scooby's doghouse and the gang must find out why. Villain(s): The Sludge Monster from the Earth's Core; Identity(ies): Mr. Buckston, president of the Coolsville Last National Bank; Reason(s): He was using Scooby's doghouse as a hiding place for the money he stole from his bank.
3	3	"Wanted Cheddar Alive"	Story by : Bill Matheny, Lane Raichert, and Laren Bright; Teleplay by : Kristina Mazzotti	September 24, 1988
The Scooby Snack factory is under attack by a cheese monster, scaring off all the workers, and Scooby is determined to solve the case. Villain(s): The Cheese Monster; Identity(ies): Larry P. Acme, CEO of the Acme Corporation's division of dog biscuit production Reason(s): To put the Scooby Snacks factory out of business so his business can take over.
4	4	"The Schnook Who Took My Comic Book"	Jim Ryan	October 1, 1988
Shaggy goes to buy a rare first edition of his favorite comic book, only for it to be stolen by a living version of the comic's villain. Villain(s): Doctor Croaker; Identity(ies): Wendel McWendel, creator of the Commander Cool franchise Reason(s): To ensure that his copy of the comic's first edition is the only existing one, thus increasing its value.
5	5	"For Letter or Worse"	Laren Bright, Bill Matheny, and Lane Raichert	October 8, 1988
As Shaggy and Scooby are chosen as contestants on their favorite game show, the ghost of a gangster appears. Villain(s): The Ghost of Al Cabone; Identity(ies): Prestina alias Pop O'Connor and The Great Mel, former magician and television star Reason(s): To take revenge on the game show's television station for the cancellation of her show.
6	6	"The Babysitter from Beyond"	Story by : Tom Ruegger; Teleplay by : Wayne Kaatz	October 15, 1988
The gang deliver Shaggy's baby sister Sugie to a babysitter, but the babysitter's house turns out to be the old lair of Manny the Mauler, a master criminal who has recently escaped from prison. To make matters worse, a living version of a monster from a new horror film is on the prowl. Villain(s): Boogedy Bones and Manny the Mauler, master criminal Identity(ies): Molly the Mol, former accomplice of Manny, as Boogedy Bones; Reason(s): To obtain Manny's stolen money before he could.
7	7	"Now Museum, Now You Don't"	Story by : Bill Matheny, Lane Raichert, and Laren Bright; Teleplay by : Jim Ryan	October 22, 1988
When a ghost of a Samurai warlord reclaims their "cursed" pair of swords at the Coolsonian Museum and Shaggy and Scooby are blamed for the theft, the gang returns to the museum to prove their innocence. Villain(s): The Samurai Ghost; Identity(ies): Mr. Dayton, curator of the Coolsonian Museum; Reason(s): To obtain a fortune from the swords' insurance policy.
8	8	"Snow Place Like Home"	Story by : Lane Raichert, Bill Matheny, and Laren Bright; Teleplay by : Mary Jo Ludin	October 29, 1988
When the gang goes to a ski lodge on the brink of bankruptcy, they encounter a cryokinetic monster causing trouble. Villain(s): The Ice Demon; Identity(ies): Mr. Forester, park ranger Reason(s): To cover up his obtainment of diamonds from a nearby mine.
9	9	"Scooby Dude"	Laren Bright, Bill Matheny, and Lane Raichert	November 5, 1988
A trip to the beach turns into another mystery for the gang when, on the trail of dolphins stolen from a local public aquarium owned by Velma's aunt, they encounter a headless skateboarder. Villain(s): The Headless Skateboarder; Identity(ies): Al, former skateboarding champion; aided by Sandy Sneakers, local beach patrol Reason(s): To use the dolphins for their drug-smuggling operations.
10	10	"Ghost Who's Coming to Dinner"	Lane Raichert, Bill Matheny, and Laren Bright	November 12, 1988
On Halloween, the gang meets a kindly couple and a friendly ghost living in their house and must solve a mystery of a pirate ghost haunting it, so it is not demolished and the friendly ghost will not cease to exist when it is. Villain(s): Boobeard; Identity(ies): Jack, the Johnsons' handyman Reason(s): To obtain the Johnsons’ land and profit off of it.
11	11	"The Story Stick"	Laren Bright, Bill Matheny, and Lane Raichert	November 19, 1988
A camping trip at an Indian reservation ends in another mystery when the gang encounters a living and territorial totem pole. Villain(s): The Totem Spirit; Identity(ies): Mr. Ryan, local architect Reason(s): To cover up his theft of valuable Indian artifacts. Cameo appearance(s): Yogi Bear
12	12	"Robopup"	Story by : Laren Bright, Bill Matheny, and Lane Raichert; Teleplay by : Mary Jo Ludin	December 3, 1988
Scooby's abilities become challenged by a robot dog as the gang investigate a series of robberies in Daphne's family home perpetrated by the ghost of her family's former chef. Villain(s): The Ghost of Pierre Goulash; Identity(ies): Mr. Gordon, the Blakes' security guard; aided by Robopup; Reason(s): To cover up his selling of the Blakes' furniture that he was stealing.
13	13	"Lights... Camera... Monster"	Laren Bright, Bill Matheny, and Lane Raichert	December 10, 1988
A living version of a monster from a long-running film series starts haunting the Coolsville Mall and the gang is on the case. Villain(s): Stinkweed; Identity(ies): Vincent Thorne, Stinkweed actor Reason(s): To have the Stinkweed franchise discontinued as he has always despised his roles in it.

=== Season 2 (1989) ===
For Seasons 2-4, the series used traditional cel animation.

No. overall	No. in season	Title	Written by	Original release date
14	1	"Curse of the Collar"	Bill Matheny, Lane Raichert, and Laren Bright	September 9, 1989
When Scooby inherits his family's hideous but valuable collar heirloom, the ghost of a sadistic dogcatcher his parents defeated years ago returns to steal it. Villain(s): The Ghost of Buster McMuttmauler; Identity(ies): Mr. Trixenstuff, the Knittingham Puppy Farm's dog trainer Reason(s): To obtain the family collar.
15	2	"The Return of Commander Cool"	Laren Bright, Bill Matheny, and Lane Raichert	September 16, 1989
Shaggy develops amnesia during a case involving an alien, making him believe that he is his favorite comic book superhero, Commander Cool. Villain(s): The Alien; Identity(ies): Barbara Simone, Carol Colossal's secretary Reason(s): To cover up her selling of Commander Cool toy blueprints that she was stealing.
16	3	"The Spirit of Rock 'n' Roll"	Story by : Bill Matheny, Laren Bright, and Lane Raichert; Teleplay by : Mary Jo Ludin	September 23, 1989
The ghost of former rock legend, Purvis Parker, resurfaces to take revenge on new rock star, Buddy Chillner. Villain(s): The Ghost of Purvis Parker; Identity(ies): Mr. Dilton, proprietor of the Parker Place music museum Reason(s): To have Chillner disgraced for overshadowing his superior.
17	4	"Chickenstein Lives"	Story by : Bill Matheny, Lane Raichert, and Laren Bright; Teleplay by : Evelyn A-R Gabai	September 30, 1989
A chicken-like monster starts haunting the "National Exaggerator", Freddy's favorite newspaper tabloid which is now owned by his uncle. Villain(s): Chickenstein; Identity(ies): Casmer Codwaller alias Granny Sweetwater, fortune teller/criminal salesman Reason(s): To cover up his business of selling stolen goods.
18	5	"Night of the Living Burger"	Laren Bright, Lane Raichert, and Bill Matheny	October 14, 1989
Mr. O'Greasy hires the gang to foil a burger-like monster that is haunting his restaurant. All the while, Shaggy and Scooby are on non-speaking terms due to an undisclosed argument. Villain(s): The Burger Monster; Identity(ies): Skippy Johnson, longtime employee of Mr. O'Greasy; Reason(s): To take revenge on O'Greasy for never giving him a raise throughout his employment.
19	6	"The Computer Walks Among Us"	Story by : Bill Matheny, Lane Raichert, and Laren Bright; Teleplay by : Alan Swayze	October 21, 1989
When Velma's latest invention, a computerized robot, becomes rogue and has her suspended from Coolsville Junior High, the gang must return to stop it. Villain(s): The Dinkley 2000 robot Identity(ies): Controlled by Bruce Wormsley, second top student in the gang's class Reason(s): To usurp Velma as the top student, as he was fed up with always being outdone by her.
20	7	"Dog Gone Scooby"	Laren Bright, Bill Matheny, and Lane Raichert	October 28, 1989
When Scooby runs away from home after being neglected by the gang, they realize that their friend group is not the same without him and set out to find him as he soon gets pursued by an obsessive stranger. Villain(s): The stranger Identity(ies): Paula P. Casso, famous artist (due to a misunderstanding); Reason(s): To use the likeness of Scooby's head for her latest painting.
21	8	"Terror, Thy Name Is Zombo"	Story by : Bill Matheny, Lane Raichert, and Laren Bright; Teleplay by : Evelyn A-R Gabai	November 4, 1989
The gang encounters a clown ghost at their favorite amusement park. Villain(s): The Ghost of Zombo the Clown; Identity(ies): Joey Jipner, member of the Jipner family, the amusement park's owners Reason(s): To buy out the amusement park and become its sole proprietor, thereby controlling all the profits.

=== Season 3 (1990) ===
No. overall	No. in season	Title	Written by	Original release date
22	1	"Night of the Boogey Biker"	Laren Bright, Lane Raichert, and Bill Matheny	September 8, 1990
22	1	"Dawn of the Spooky Shuttle Scare"	David Schwartz	September 8, 1990
Daphne bets Freddy that he cannot go twenty-four hours without accusing Red Herring of a crime; Red's aunt hires the gang to find her stolen motorcycle, but unfortunately for Freddy, its thief is revealed to be her nephew. Villain(s): The Boogey Biker; Identity(ies): Red Herring; Reason(s): To keep the gang from finding out about him fixing his aunt's motorcycle and adding a sidecar to it as a present for her birthday. A chance for Velma's latest invention to enter space is interrupted by a ghost. Villain(s): The Astronaut Ghost; Identity(ies): Simon Simonson, scientist Reason(s): To take revenge on Velma for ruining his experiment's chances of going into space. Note: Both episodes are eleven minutes long.
23	2	"Horror of the Haunted Hairpiece"	Story by : Bill Matheny and Lane Raichert; Teleplay by : Laren Bright and Evelyn A-R Gabai	October 6, 1990
A hairy monster from a new video game attacks an amusement arcade owned by Daphne's father, in which she has recently been employed at. Villain(s): Bigwig; Identity(ies): Krusty Baker, local restaurant owner Reason(s): To put the arcade out of business in an attempt to save his failing restaurant, as he believed that its attendance was declining because of the arcade.
24	3	"Wrestle Maniacs"	Story by : Bill Matheny, Lane Raichert, and Laren Bright; Teleplay by : Evelyn A-R Gabai	November 3, 1990
The ghost of a disgraced wrestler returns to haunt the Coolsville Wrestling Federation. Villain(s): The Ghost of the Hooded Heifer; Identity(ies): Herbert Blaum alias The Coolsville Comet, wrestler/competing businessman Reason(s): To usurp Carol Colossal's ownership of the Coolsville Wrestling Federation.

=== Season 4 (1991) ===
No. overall	No. in season	Title	Written by	Original release date
25	1	"The Were-Doo of Doo Manor"	David Schwartz	August 3, 1991
An old curse returns to haunt the Doo family and the gang must solve this mystery. Villain(s): Nasty-Doo; Identity(ies): Professor Digmi, paleontologist Reason(s): To cover up his discovery of a missing leg from a fossil.
26	2	"Catcher on the Sly"	Scott Jeralds and Bill Matheny	August 10, 1991
26	2	"The Ghost of Mrs. Shusham"	Bill Matheny	August 10, 1991
26	2	"The Wrath of Waitro"	Evelyn A-R Gabai and Bill Matheny	August 10, 1991
Scooby has a re-encounter with Buster McMuttmauler, who is now seeking revenge on him and his family. What ensues is a series of escapades reminiscent of the Wile E. Coyote and the Road Runner cartoons. Villain(s): Buster McMuttmauler, dog catcher and old enemy of Scooby; Identity(ies): N/A; Reason(s): To catch Scooby. Note: This episode is three minutes long. The ghost of a librarian returns to haunt Shaggy and Scooby, who still have an overdue book. Villain(s): The Ghost of Mrs. Shusham; Identity(ies): Bernice Binder, proprietor of the Binders Books independent bookstore Reason(s): To swindle Scooby and Shaggy out of the overdue book, since other existing copies of it are rare. Note: This episode is eleven minutes long. In trouble at a restaurant and forced to pay for their meal by washing dishes, Shaggy and Scooby imagine themselves as Commander Cool and Mellow Mutt, with the restaurant's snooty waiter as their latest enemy. Villain(s): Waitro; Identity(ies): N/A; Reason(s): To make his food taste great. Note: This episode is seven minutes long.
27	3	"Mayhem of the Moving Mollusk"	David Schwartz and Bill Matheny	August 17, 1991
The gang travel to New York City as they help prevent monster hunting business, Critter Getters, from going out of business by solving the case of a snail-like monster. Villain(s): The Moving Mollusk; Identity(ies): Lester Leonard, owner and founder of "Ghoul Gone" and former member of "Critter Getters"; Reason(s): To hurt his competition and make his own business more popular.

== Notes ==
- From January to July, 1991, the ABC Weekend Special replaced A Pup Named Scooby-Doo on ABC's Saturday morning lineup. The final three first-run episodes were not run until August, 1991.
- When released on DVD in complete season sets, A Pup Named Scooby-Doo: The Complete 1st Season contained all thirteen episodes from the first season, while episodes that had more than one story-line in them were considered to be separate episodes, totalling thirty episodes.
