= A Pup Named Scooby-Doo =

American animated television series

- Genre: Mystery; Comedy; Comedy horror
- Based on: Characters by Hanna-Barbera Productions
- Developed by: Tom Ruegger
- Directed by: Don Lusk; Art Davis; Oscar Dufau; Bob Goe; Paul Sommer; Ray Patterson; Robert Alvarez; Carl Urbano
- Voices of: Don Messick; Casey Kasem; Carl Steven; Kellie Martin; Christina Lange
- Theme music composer: John Debney
- Opening theme: "A Pup Named Scooby-Doo!"
- Composer: John Debney
- Country of origin: United States
- Original language: English
- No. of seasons: 4
- No. of episodes: 27 (30 segments) (list of episodes)

Production
- Executive producers: William Hanna; Joseph Barbera
- Producers: Tom Ruegger; Lane Raichert; Craig Zukowski
- Editors: Gil Iverson; Tim Iverson
- Running time: 22 minutes
- Production company: Hanna-Barbera Productions (Note: Animation outsourced to Wang Film Productions and Fil-Cartoons.)

Original release
- Network: ABC
- Release: September 10, 1988 – August 17, 1991

Related
- The 13 Ghosts of Scooby-Doo (1985); What's New, Scooby-Doo? (2002–06)

A Pup Named Scooby-Doo is an American animated mystery comedy television series produced by Hanna-Barbera. It is the eighth incarnation of the studio's Scooby-Doo franchise and depicts younger versions of the title character and his companions as they solve mysteries, similar to the original television series. The series was developed by Tom Ruegger and premiered on September 10, 1988, airing for four seasons on ABC and during the syndicated block The Funtastic World of Hanna-Barbera until August 17, 1991.

Along with most of Hanna-Barbera's production staff, Ruegger departed from the studio after the first season to create Tiny Toon Adventures for Warner Bros. Animation, and Don Lusk, a longtime animator for the Disney and Bill Melendez animation studios, took over as director. A Pup Named Scooby-Doo is the final television series in the franchise in which Don Messick portrayed Scooby-Doo before his death in 1997 and the first in which Fred Jones is voiced by someone other than Frank Welker, as the character was voiced by Carl Steven, though Welker voiced other characters in the show. Messick and Casey Kasem, who voiced Shaggy Rogers, were the only original voice actors from prior Scooby-Doo productions to reprise their roles, and both received starring credits for their work.

== Episodes ==
Season	Episodes	Originally released	
Season	Episodes	First released	Last released
1	13	September 10, 1988	December 10, 1988
2	8	September 9, 1989	November 4, 1989
3	3	September 8, 1990	November 3, 1990
4	3	August 3, 1991	August 17, 1991

== Characters ==
=== Main ===
- Scooby-Doo (voiced by Don Messick) – The main character of the series and the mascot of the Scooby-Doo Detective Agency.
- Norville "Shaggy" Rogers (voiced by Casey Kasem) – Scooby-Doo's best friend and owner. He loves to eat and disagrees with other members of the gang, considering the monster of the week.
- Fred "Freddie" Jones (voiced by Carl Steven) – The leader of the Scooby-Doo Detective Agency. Unlike his previous incarnations, he is depicted in this show as scatterbrained and tends to jump to conclusions rather than use common sense. He is outspoken and has a large imagination, which always leads him to jump to the wrong conclusions. His favorite magazine is the National Exaggerator, which his uncle gains ownership of during the course of the series. Before accusing Red Herring, he often offers a hypothesis to explain the mystery, which is exaggerated and incorrect. However, he is occasionally correct in his assumptions. In contrast to Daphne, young Fred believes in ghosts, while his adult counterpart usually does not.
- Daphne Blake (voiced by Kellie Martin) – A wealthy, vain girl who is haughty, skeptical and sarcastic, especially toward Fred, and does not believe in the supernatural, often accusing people of crimes based solely on her intuition. Since she was born into money and comes from a wealthy family, she often calls on her butler, Jenkins, for help, usually for trivial reasons, something she does not do when she is older.
- Velma Dinkley (voiced by Christina Lange) – An intelligent, but shy and soft-spoken girl who wears thick glasses. The biggest change to her character is that she owns a mobile computer that can determine who the culprit is. Velma also owns an oversized motorized skateboard with a similar color scheme to the Mystery Machine.

=== Supporting ===
- Red Herring (voiced by Scott Menville) – The town bully, who often torments the gang but is always thwarted. Fred often accuses him of being the villain, but is mostly incorrect. He is the villain in "Night of the Boogey Biker", but Fred does not verbally accuse him due to Daphne betting that he cannot not go a day without accusing Herring. His name is a reference to the idiom "red herring".
- Sugie (voiced by B. J. Ward) – Shaggy's baby sister, who also appears in The New Scooby and Scrappy-Doo Show episode "Wedding Bell Boos" under her given name of Maggie Rogers.
- Gus – The janitor at Coolsville Junior High, who also works at the Coolsville Mall and possibly for the Blakes, and is also an inventor.
- O'Greasy (voiced by Charlie Adler) – The owner of the O'Greasy restaurants, who once competed with Arnie Barney until his business became more popular. The gang helps him when a burger monster threatens to shut down his restaurants.
- Carol Colossal – The owner of Colossal Toys and later the Coolsville Wrestling Federation (CWF), and the creator of Commander Cool. The gang helps her when her business and the Commander Cool toyline is in danger.
- Barbara Simone – Colossal's secretary. In The Return of Commander Cool", she tries to destroy Colossal's business by stealing and selling blueprints for its Commander Cool toyline, but her plans are foiled by the Scooby-Doo Detective Agency. After her defeat, Colossal gives her a license to leave prison and resume her work, as seen in "Wrestle Maniacs".
- Jenkins (voiced by Don Messick) – Daphne's butler, who appears to help people whenever his name is called. When he does not answer Daphne's call, a butler named Dawson appears instead, telling Daphne that Jenkins is unavailable because he is busy shopping.

== Production ==
The series' format follows the trend of the "babyfication" of older cartoon characters, as its depictions of the original Scooby-Doo, Where Are You! cast are elementary-aged kids. The series reintroduces Fred Jones and Velma Dinkley to the show, both of whom had not appeared as regular characters since the 1970s, and Scrappy-Doo was removed from the cast. The series uses the same basic formula as the original 1969 show: the Scooby-Doo Detective Agency, a forerunner of Mystery Inc., solves supernatural mysteries in the town of Coolsville, where the monsters of the week are always revealed to be bad guys in masks and costumes. However, the series has a much different tone, as producer Tom Ruegger expanded on the humor he established with producer Mitch Schauer in The 13 Ghosts of Scooby-Doo. This results in the series being a more comedic version of Scooby-Doo that satirizes the conventions of the show's previous incarnations. The characters often do wild Tex Avery/Bob Clampett-esque takes when they encounter ghosts and monsters, which animation director and overseas supervisor Glen Kennedy often animated. The monsters themselves are also more comedic, such as a creature made out of molten cheese, a monster in the form of a giant hamburger, and the ghost of a dogcatcher. The introduction of the show was part of an initiative at ABC to revive older, recognizable characters that older children and parents of younger children would appreciate (other new series included The New Adventures of Winnie the Pooh and The New Adventures of Beany and Cecil) in the hopes that they could operate the people meter, a device introduced in 1987 that ABC blamed for the failure of its preschool-oriented programming failing in the ratings the year prior, as ABC believed young children were too young to operate the people meters.

In 2013, Scooby-Doo! Adventures: The Mystery Map, a direct-to-video puppet film, was released exclusively to US Walmart stores and digital download, using character designs from A Pup Named Scooby-Doo.

=== Music ===
The series features songs in the style of rock and roll during the chase scene in each episode, similar to the second-season episodes of Scooby-Doo, Where are You!. However, unlike previous versions of the show, the characters are often aware of the music being played and will dance along with the ghosts and monsters before continuing the chase; Glen Kennedy often animated these dance cycles. The show's theme song features lyrics by series creator Tom Ruegger and music by composer John Debney.

== Home media ==
Warner Home Video (via Hanna-Barbera and Warner Bros. Family Entertainment) initially released all 27 episodes of A Pup Named Scooby-Doo on DVD in Region 1 in seven volume sets. They subsequently re-released the entire series in different DVD sets. The first two seasons are available for download from the iTunes Store. "Wrestle Maniacs" can be found on the Scooby-Doo! WrestleMania Mystery DVD.

Volume releases
Season		Volume	Episodes	Release date
1	1988	1	4 ("A Bicycle Built for Boo!" – "The Schnook Who Took My Comic Book")	July 19, 2005
1	1988	2	4 ("For Letter or Worse" – "Snow Place Like Home")	July 19, 2005
1	1988	3	4 ("Scooby Dude" – "Robopup")	July 18, 2006
1	1988	4	4 ("Lights... Camera... Monster" – "The Spirit of Rock'n Roll")	July 18, 2006
2	1989	4	4 ("Lights... Camera... Monster" – "The Spirit of Rock'n Roll")	July 18, 2006
2	1989	5	4 ("Chickenstein Lives" – "Dog Gone Scooby")	January 9, 2007
2	1989	6	4 ("Terror, Thy Name Is Zombo" – "Wrestle Maniacs")	May 15, 2007
3	1990	6	4 ("Terror, Thy Name Is Zombo" – "Wrestle Maniacs")	May 15, 2007
4	1991	7	3 ("The Were-Doo of Doo Manor" – "Mayhem of the Moving Mollusk")	August 14, 2007
Volumes 1–3 Triple Feature Box Set			12 ("A Bicycle Built for Boo!" – "Robopup")	April 13, 2010
4 Kid Favorites Quadruple Feature Box Set			16 ("A Bicycle Built for Boo!" – "The Spirit of Rock'n Roll")	September 27, 2011
4 Kid Favorites Quadruple Feature Box Set			16 ("A Bicycle Built for Boo!" – "The Spirit of Rock'n Roll")	January 17, 2012

Complete season releases
Season		Set	Episodes	Release date	Extras
1	1988	1	13	March 18, 2008	Coolsville, U.S.A. Interactive Map
2	1989	2	14	March 17, 2009	Bonus episode: Shaggy & Scooby-Doo Get a Clue!: "Party Arty"
3	1990	2	14	March 17, 2009	Bonus episode: Shaggy & Scooby-Doo Get a Clue!: "Party Arty"
4	1991	2	14	March 17, 2009	Bonus episode: Shaggy & Scooby-Doo Get a Clue!: "Party Arty"

Compilation appearances
Title	Episodes	Release date
Scooby-Doo! 13 Spooky Tales: For the Love of Snacks	2 ("Wanted Cheddar Alive" and "Night of the Living Burger")	January 7, 2014
Scooby-Doo! WrestleMania Mystery	1 ("Wrestle Maniacs")	March 25, 2014
Scooby-Doo! 13 Spooky Tales: Surf's Up, Scooby-Doo!	1 ("Scooby Dude")	May 5, 2015

== In other media ==
The What's New, Scooby-Doo? episode "A Terrifying Round with a Menacing Metallic Clown" features a flashback to Velma's fifth birthday, using the character designs from A Pup Named Scooby-Doo, albeit with some modifications, such as Daphne wearing purple rather than pink. Fred and Velma are the only returning characters to speak in the flashback, being voiced by Welker and Mindy Cohn. The continuity of the live-action film Scooby-Doo! The Mystery Begins establishes the team meeting in their teens.
