= Scooby-Doo! Thrills and Spills =

1999 board game

Scooby-Doo! Thrills and Spills is a 1999 board game published by Pressman Toy Corporation.

== Gameplay ==
Scooby-Doo! Thrills and Spills is a game in which the player moves pieces up a path according to a spinner while avoiding wind‑up monsters that can knock pieces back to the start. The winner is the first player to get both of their movers to the Mystery Machine finish space. This game is intended for 2 to 4 players ages 6 and up.

== Reception ==
The Canadian Toy Testing Council gave the game one star on a scale of three stars, two stars, one star, novelty, not recommended. It said that "This action board game had a groovy theme (Scooby) and some problems [...] but it did entertain kids willing to forgive its shortcomings."

The editors of Zillions magazine gave the game a Fun score of "Good" and noted that some testers thought this was a game for little kids.
