= List of The Scooby-Doo Show episodes =

This is a list of episodes from The Scooby-Doo Show. The episode titles given for the show reflect Hanna-Barbera studio records, as no on-screen titles were given for most episodes.

40 episodes were aired on ABC across three seasons from September 11, 1976 to December 23, 1978.

== Series overview ==
Season	Episodes	Originally released	
Season	Episodes	First released	Last released
1	16	September 11, 1976	December 18, 1976
2	8	September 10, 1977	October 29, 1977
3	16	September 9, 1978	December 23, 1978

== Episodes ==
=== Season 1 (1976) ===
Episodes of this season initially aired as segments of The Scooby-Doo/Dynomutt Hour.

#	Episode title	Villains	Original airdate	Plot	Culprits
SDD-1	"High Rise Hair Raiser"	The Specter of Ebenezer Crabbe and The Ghost of Netty Crabbe	September 11, 1976	When Fred, Shaggy, and Scooby get jobs on a construction crew, they discover that the building site is haunted by the specter of Ebenezer Crabbe, a supposed sorcerer whose house used to stand on the construction site.	Red Sparks & Jim Rivets
SDD-2	"The Fiesta Host is an Aztec Ghost"	The Ghost of King Katazuma and the sentient Aztec statue	September 18, 1976	The gang visits Cinqo, Mexico for a fiesta, but learns that it has been canceled due to an attack from a ghost of an Aztec monarch. After Scooby and Shaggy are attacked in their hotel room by a sentient statue, the gang decides to investigate an old temple, where the ghost awaits.	Professor Stonehack and Mrs. Stonehack
SDD-3	"The Gruesome Game of the Gator Ghoul"	The Gator Ghoul	September 25, 1976	On their way to see Scooby's cousin, Scooby-Dum, at the Hokeyfenokee Swamp (a parody of the Okefenokee Swamp) , the gang encounters the Gator Ghoul, an alligator-like monster that wants to ruin the soft drink business owned by Scooby-Dum's owners.	Alice Dovely
SDD-4	"Watt a Shocking Ghost"	The 10,000 Volt Ghost	October 2, 1976	The Mystery Machine runs out of gas, stranding the gang in the empty snow-capped town of Winterhaven, where an electrokinetic ghost of its power plant's chief electrician is running amok and has scared everyone out.	Mayor Dudley and Mr. Voltner
SDD-5	"The Headless Horseman of Halloween"	The Headless Horseman	October 9, 1976	On Halloween night, the gang and Scooby-Dum go to a Halloween party at Crane Manor. When the party is crashed by a headless horseman, the gang tries to investigate the mystery, only to have the horseman steal the head of one of the Crane family members.	Elwood Crane
SDD-6	"Scared a Lot in Camelot"	The Ghost of Merlin and the Black Knight	October 16, 1976	When Shaggy's uncle disappears, the gang goes to his castle to investigate. It turns out that when Shaggy's uncle shipped the castle from the United Kingdom, he brought back with him the ghosts of Merlin, the Black Knight and King Arthur's Round Table.	Clarence alias Zarko and his henchman
SDD-7	"The Harum Scarum Sanitarium"	The Ghost of Doctor Coffin	October 23, 1976	While on a trip to Niagara Falls, the gang ends up staying at a sanitarium. During the night, they are terrorized by the ghost of its chief researcher, who is said to have gone insane and is performing experiments to control dogs.	Officer Oldfield
SDD-8	"The No Faced Zombie Chase Case"	The No Face Zombie and the Gorilla	October 30, 1976	While at a sandwich bar, Scooby witnesses a burglary committed by a faceless zombie, who has stolen a rare and supposedly cursed coin. As they follow the zombie to the Dilly Dally Dolly Factory, they end up being chased all over the building by the zombie and a gorilla.	Mr. Dilly and a robot
SDD-9	"Mamba Wamba and the Voodoo Hoodoo"	Mamba Wamba, Mamba Zombie, and Zombie Lila	November 6, 1976	The gang goes to see their friend Alex Super's band perform. When one of the band members named Lila is captured by a witch doctor named Mamba Wamba, they must try to find her before she is turned into an evil zombie.	Roger, Lila and their henchman
SDD-10	"A Frightened Hound Meets Demons Underground"	The Demon	November 13, 1976	While in Seattle, Daphne is captured by a steaming demon, and the gang must travel down to an abandoned underground town to rescue her and solve the mystery.	Albert Tross alias Sam Crenshaw
SDD-11	"A Bum Steer for Scooby"	Tamooka, the Medicine Man Ghost and an anthropomorphic bull	November 20, 1976	The gang visits Daphne's Uncle Matt, whose ranch is being haunted by Tamooka, an airborne ancient spirit that takes on the form of a bull. When Uncle Matt is captured, the gang searches for him in cave dwellings, only to find a ghostly medicine man who wants to be rid of them.	A flying machine, Lenny the Cook and Sam Farren
SDD-12	"There's a Demon Shark in the Foggy Dark"	The Demon Shark	November 25, 1976	On a visit to Aqualand, the gang encounters a shark-like demon, which has thawed from its frozen state and has apparently stolen valuable Indian pearls.	Mr. Wells
SDD-13	"Scooby-Doo, Where's the Crew?"	The Ghost of Captain Pescado, the Kelp Monster & the Octopus Monster	November 27, 1976	While helping a professor research a sunken ship, the gang runs into the ghost of the wreck's captain and a pair of sea monsters associated with him. When the trio kidnaps the professor, the gang must search for him aboard the haunted ship.	First Mate Carp, Mr. McFin and Mr. McGill
SDD-14	"The Ghost That Sacked the Quarterback"	The Rambling Ghost	December 4, 1976	While the gang is watching a football team play, the star quarterback disappears and the ghost of a vengeful ex-player appears and runs amok in the stadium.	Buck Bender
SDD-15	"The Ghost of the Bad Humor Man"	The Technicolor Ice Cream Phantoms	December 11, 1976	When the Mystery Machine crashes in front of an ice cream factory, it appears Shaggy and Scooby's ice cream fantasies have come true...that is until they discover that a trio of ice cream-like phantoms are haunting the factory.	Sammy the Shrimp, under the alias "Mr. Grizzly", and his henchmen duo
SDD-16	"The Spirits of '76"	The Ghosts of Benedict Arnold, William Demont and Major John Andre	December 18, 1976	While in Washington D.C., the kids visit the Splitsonian Institution (a parody of the Smithsonian Institution) but lose Scooby and get locked in after hours. While searching for Scooby, they find strange goings on at the museum, like a locomotive moving on its own and the ghosts of American traitors Benedict Arnold and William Demont and British spy John André running amok in the building.	Mr. Clive, Mr. Willit and their accomplice

=== Season 2 (1977) ===
Episodes in Season 2 initially aired as segments of Scooby's All-Star Laff-A-Lympics.

#	Episode title	Villains	Original airdate	Plot	Culprits
SDLA-17	"The Curse of Viking Lake"	The Viking Ghosts	September 10, 1977	When the gang arrives at Viking Lake to see Velma's uncle John, they find out he has been kidnapped by ghosts of Vikings.	Mr. Hanson and a geologist duo
SDLA-18	"Vampire Bats and Scaredy Cats"	Lisa Vanaugh's vampiric grandfather	September 17, 1977	The gang and Scooby-Dum go to Great Skull Island to visit their friend Lisa Vanaugh for her eighteenth birthday. While staying at her family's hotel, the gang realizes they may not survive the night when Lisa's vampiric grandfather appears and makes her like him.	Leon Vanaugh
SDLA-19	"Hang in There, Scooby-Doo"	The Pterodactyl Ghost	September 24, 1977	On a trip to a hang-gliding contest, the gang encounters a ghost of an evolved pterodactyl that is trying to scare anyone away from a mysterious cliff.	Johnny and Mr. Bohannon
SDLA-20	"The Chiller Diller Movie Thriller"	The Ghost of Milo Booth	October 1, 1977	Scooby-Doo and Scooby-Dum's actor cousin Scooby-Dee, is remaking a movie when the ghost of the original film's star Milo Booth, appears and kidnaps her replacing her with a doppelganger. The gang must head into a cemetery haunted by Booth's ghost to find her only to be locked inside Booth's crypt.	Jim Moss
SDLA-21	"The Spooky Case of the Grand Prix Race"	The Phantom Racer	October 8, 1977	At the Osbourne Grand Prix Race of 1977, a former racer's ghost is making the other drivers disappear when they enter the fog. The gang has Shaggy pose as a racer to lure the phantom out into the open, but the plan backfires when Shaggy is captured.	Ken Rogers
SDLA-22	"The Ozark Witch Switch"	The Ghost of Witch McCoy and the Zombie	October 15, 1977	The Mystery Machine breaks down, and the gang stays in the Hatfields' cabin. During the night, a witch's ghost turns the Hatfields into frogs, just as she promised over two centuries years ago. Whilst searching for the Hatfields, the gang encounter a zombie nearby.	Aggie Wilkins and Zeke Harkins
SDLA-23	"Creepy Cruise"	The Futuristic Monster	October 22, 1977	While on a cruise throughout the South Pacific, not far from Australia, the gang meets scientist Professor Von Klamp, who has just invented a time machine. Shortly, the machine malfunctions and a monster from the far future comes out of it and runs amok. When the professor is captured by the monster, it appears all will be lost since he is the only one who can send it back to its proper time period.	Professor Von Klamp and Simon Grady
SDLA-24	"The Creepy Heap from the Deep"	The Creepy Heap from the Deep and the soulless Captain Clements	October 29, 1977	While having a beach party, a sea monster appears and the gang retreats to a nearby captain's house on a deserted cliff. The captain tells the gang that the monster feeds on the souls of the living. After the gang goes for help, they return to the house and find the captain's soul has been stolen by the monster and now he has become a zombie controlled by the monster.	A bank robber and Captain Clements

=== Season 3 (1978) ===
Episodes in Season 3 initially aired as segments of Scooby's All-Stars. Some episodes aired under the Scooby-Doo, Where Are You! title and the whole season was eventually packaged as that series' third season as well.

#	Episode title	Villains	Original airdate	Plot	Culprits
SDAS-25	"Watch Out! The Willawaw!"	The Willawaw and the Owl Men	September 9, 1978	When Velma's uncle Dave goes missing, the gang attempts to find him. On their search, the gang is attacked by the legendary Willawaw, a giant owl which is said to capture its victims when an owl calls their name.	Grey Fox and his henchmen
SDAS-26	"A Creepy Tangle in the Bermuda Triangle"	The Skeleton Men	September 16, 1978	While on a boat flowing down the Gulf Stream, the gang witnesses a flying saucer hijacking an airplane. They crash on Diablo Island, where they discover a spooky-looking sea captain and a trio of cycloptic and skeletal extraterrestrials.	Doctor Grimsley and his henchmen
SDAS-27	"A Scary Night with a Snow Beast Fright"	The Snow Beast	September 23, 1978	After being invited by to the North Pole by scientist Professor Krueger, the gang finds out he has been captured by a terrifying arctic monster that resembles a furry dinosaur.	Jean Pierre Baptiste
SDAS-28	"To Switch a Witch"	The Ghost of Milissa Wilcox, the Witch of Salem	September 30, 1978	On Halloween night, the gang visits their friend Arlene Wilcox in Salem, Massachusetts. While visiting, the gang encounters a witch's ghost, who is identical to Arlene.	Arlene's estranged twin sister and Gar Mooney
SDAS-29	"The Tar Monster"	The Tar Monster	October 7, 1978	The gang goes to Turkey, where the ancient city of Byzantius is being excavated, but the workers are being scared away by the city's ancient guardian called the Tar Monster.	Mr. Stoner
SDAS-30	"A Highland Fling with a Monstrous Thing"	The Ghost of Finnyan McDuff & The Loch Ness Monster	October 14, 1978	The gang travels to Scotland to visit their friend Aggie MacDuff, whose family castle is being plagued by the ghost of her great-grandfather, who lures the Loch Ness Monster with his bagpipes.	Jamie Cragmoor and a music-controlled submarine
SDAS-31	"The Creepy Case of Old Iron Face"	Old Iron Face	October 21, 1978	As the gang goes water-skiing, they have a near-fatal encounter with a masked figure and his sharks. When they visit a cafe, they find out that the figure is the ghost of pirate Old Iron Face, a convict from Skull Island with an iron mask welded onto his face. The gang venture to island, where the ghost is lurking.	Mama Mione
SDAS-32	"Jeepers, It's the Jaguaro!"	The Jaguaro	October 28, 1978	After an emergency plane landing in the Amazon jungle in Brazil, the gang encounters the Jaguaro, a terrifying creature with the head of a black-furred Smilodon and the body of a brown great ape who is hailed as a deity by the natives and is haunting the jungle.	Barney and Luis
SDAS-33	"Make a Beeline Away from That Feline" (Note: Titled "Who Was That Cat Creature I Saw You with Last Night" in certain television reruns.)	The Cat Creature	November 4, 1978	While the gang is in New York City to visit Daphne's aunt Olivia, Shaggy witnesses a cat creature robbing a jewelry store on their way to her apartment. When they arrive, Olivia tells them that she has received a strange package. Shaggy and Scooby trace the return address but find that it was sent from a cemetery by the cat creature.	Doctor B. B. Bell
SDAS-34	"The Creepy Creature of Vulture's Claw"	The Mantis Creature	November 11, 1978	While visiting Professor Greer at Vulture's Claw botanical gardens, the gang encounters a seven-foot mantis who is trying to scare the professor away and three different suspicious characters that are also in the botanical gardens.	Professor Greer
SDAS-35	"The Diabolical Disc Demon"	The Phantom (Disc Demon)	November 18, 1978	The gang goes to Decade Records recording studio to see a live recording from their friend Jimmy Lewis. However, when songwriter Tony Synes disappears and a ghostly musician begins searching for his latest song, it is up to the gang to solve the mystery.	Ace Decade
SDAS-36	"Scooby's Chinese Fortune Kooky Caper"	The Moon Monster	November 25, 1978	While stranded in a palace in Rampoo, China, the gang stays with Kim who is about to receive a large inheritance. During their stay, they encounter a mythological creature called the Moon Monster that can turn people into stone if its shadow is cast over them.	Chin Wong Sing
SDAS-37	"A Menace in Venice"	The Ghostly Gondolier	December 2, 1978	In Venice, Italy, the gang meets their friend, Antonio. They soon discover that a ghost is haunting their friend, planning to steal his medallion, and head out to solve the problem when Antonio and Daphne are kidnapped.	Mario
SDAS-38	"Don't Go Near the Fortress of Fear"	The Ghost of General Juan Carlos	December 9, 1978	The gang visit a fortress in Puerto Rico and encounter the ghost of its general officer owner who wants the gang away from his territory.	Captain Eddy
SDAS-39	"The Warlock of Wimbledon"	Anthos the Warlock and the Devil Hound	December 16, 1978	In England, the gang meets up with tennis star Jimmy Pelton who has been cursed by a warlock known as Anthos before a big match at Wimbledon. The gang agrees to solve the mystery for Jimmy, but it appears they too may be cursed by Anthos.	Nick Thomas and John the Gatekeeper
SDAS-40	"The Beast is Awake in Bottomless Lake"	The Beast of Bottomless Lake	December 23, 1978	While pike fishing in Canada, the gang encounters a lake monster, who has scared the townspeople away from their homes. When the gang attempts to go under the lake, Shaggy and Scooby are nearly captured by the monster.	Julie Johnson

== See also ==
- Scooby-Doo television series topics
- Lists of American animated television series episodes
