= The Scooby & Scrappy-Doo/Puppy Hour =

- Title card
- Genre: Comedy; Action-adventure
- Directed by: Charles A. Nichols; Rudy Larriva
- Voices of: Casey Kasem; Don Messick; Frank Welker; Michael Bell; Billy Jacoby; Peter Cullen; Nancy McKeon
- Composers: Dean Elliott; Hoyt Curtin
- Country of origin: United States
- Original language: English
- No. of episodes: 13 (52 segments)

Production
- Executive producers: William Hanna; Joseph Barbera; Joe Ruby; Ken Spears
- Producers: Joe Ruby; Ken Spears
- Running time: 60 minutes
- Production companies: Hanna-Barbera Productions; Ruby-Spears Enterprises

Original release
- Network: ABC
- Release: September 25 – December 18, 1982

Related
- The Richie Rich/Scooby-Doo Show; Scary Scooby Funnies; The Puppy's Further Adventures

The Scooby & Scrappy-Doo/Puppy Hour is a 60-minute Saturday morning animated package show co-produced by Hanna-Barbera Productions and Ruby-Spears Enterprises and broadcast on ABC from September 25, 1982 to December 18, 1982. The show contained segments of Scooby-Doo & Scrappy-Doo (Hanna-Barbera), Scrappy & Yabba-Doo (Hanna-Barbera) and The Puppy's New Adventures (Ruby-Spears).

The first half-hour consisted of two 7-minute Scooby & Scrappy-Doo shorts followed by a 7-minute Scrappy & Yabba-Doo short followed by an episode of The Puppy's New Adventures in the second half-hour. The Scooby-Doo/Scrappy-related shorts were written, storyboarded and voiced at Hanna-Barbera, but animated and edited by Ruby-Spears.

On January 8, 1983, the Scooby & Scrappy-Doo segments were replaced by reruns of previously run network episodes of Scooby-Doo from various incarnations; as a result, the program was re-titled The Scooby-Doo/Puppy Hour and continued under this format until September 3, 1983.

== Scooby & Scrappy-Doo/Scrappy & Yabba-Doo ==
Scooby & Scrappy-Doo: Scooby-Doo, Scrappy-Doo and Shaggy travel across the country as the "Fearless Detective Agency" and get involved in typical spy or criminal cases.

Scrappy & Yabba-Doo: Scrappy-Doo partakes in adventures with his uncle Yabba-Doo and Deputy Dusty in the wild west. They would often deal with various bad guys, which always ended with the bad guys apprehended in the end.

=== Episode list ===
No.	Section(s)	Segment(s)	Original release date
1	"Scooby & Scrappy-Doo"	"Maltese Mackerel"	September 25, 1982
1	"Scooby & Scrappy-Doo"	"Dumb Waiter Caper"	September 25, 1982
1	"Scrappy & Yabba-Doo"	"Yabba's Rustle Hustle"	September 25, 1982
2	"Scooby & Scrappy-Doo"	"Catfish Burglar Caper"	October 2, 1982
2	"Scooby & Scrappy-Doo"	"Movie Monster Menace"	October 2, 1982
2	"Scrappy & Yabba-Doo"	"Mine Your Own Business"	October 2, 1982
3	"Scooby & Scrappy-Doo"	"Super Teen Shaggy"	October 9, 1982
3	"Scooby & Scrappy-Doo"	"Basketball Bumblers"	October 9, 1982
3	"Scrappy & Yabba-Doo"	"Tragic Magic"	October 9, 1982
4	"Scooby & Scrappy-Doo"	"Beauty Contest Caper"	October 16, 1982
4	"Scooby & Scrappy-Doo"	"Stakeout at the Takeout"	October 16, 1982
4	"Scrappy & Yabba-Doo"	"Runaway Scrappy"	October 16, 1982
5	"Scooby & Scrappy-Doo"	"Who's Scooby-Doo?"	October 23, 1982
5	"Scooby & Scrappy-Doo"	"Double Trouble Date"	October 23, 1982
5	"Scrappy & Yabba-Doo"	"Slippery Dan the Escape Man"	October 23, 1982
6	"Scooby & Scrappy-Doo"	"Cable Car Caper"	October 30, 1982
6	"Scooby & Scrappy-Doo"	"Muscle Trouble"	October 30, 1982
6	"Scrappy & Yabba-Doo"	"Low-Down Showdown"	October 30, 1982
7	"Scooby & Scrappy-Doo"	"Comic Book Caper"	November 6, 1982
7	"Scooby & Scrappy-Doo"	"Misfortune Teller"	November 6, 1982
7	"Scrappy & Yabba-Doo"	"Vild Vest Vampire"	November 6, 1982
8	"Scooby & Scrappy-Doo"	"A Gem of a Case"	November 13, 1982
8	"Scooby & Scrappy-Doo"	"From Bad to Curse"	November 13, 1982
8	"Scrappy & Yabba-Doo"	"Tumbleweed Derby"	November 13, 1982
9	"Scooby & Scrappy-Doo"	"Disappearing Car Caper"	November 20, 1982
9	"Scooby & Scrappy-Doo"	"Scooby-Doo and Genie-Poo"	November 20, 1982
9	"Scrappy & Yabba-Doo"	"Law & Disorder"	November 20, 1982
10	"Scooby & Scrappy-Doo"	"Close Encounter of the Worst Kind"	November 27, 1982
10	"Scooby & Scrappy-Doo"	"Captain Canine Caper"	November 27, 1982
10	"Scrappy & Yabba-Doo"	"Alien Schmalien"	November 27, 1982
11	"Scooby & Scrappy-Doo"	"The Incredible Cat Lady Caper"	December 4, 1982
11	"Scooby & Scrappy-Doo"	"Picnic Poopers"	December 4, 1982
11	"Scrappy & Yabba-Doo"	"Go East, Young Pardner"	December 4, 1982
12	"Scooby & Scrappy-Doo"	"One Million Years Before Lunch"	December 11, 1982
12	"Scooby & Scrappy-Doo"	"Where's the Werewolf"	December 11, 1982
12	"Scrappy & Yabba-Doo"	"Up a Crazy River"	December 11, 1982
13	"Scooby & Scrappy-Doo"	"Hoedown Showdown"	December 18, 1982
13	"Scooby & Scrappy-Doo"	"Snow Job Too Small"	December 18, 1982
13	"Scrappy & Yabba-Doo"	"Bride and Gloom"	December 18, 1982

== The Puppy's New Adventures ==
The adventures of Petey the Puppy and his friends – Dolly, Dash, Duke and Lucky – as they travel around the world together searching for his young owner Tommy and his family.

=== Episode list ===
No.	Title	Original release date
1	"The Treasure of the Ancient Ruins"	September 25, 1982
2	"The Puppy's Dangerous Mission"	October 2, 1982
3	"The American Puppy in Paris"	October 9, 1982
4	"The Puppy and the Pirates"	October 16, 1982
5	"The Mystery of the Wailing Cat"	October 23, 1982
6	"The Puppy's Australian Adventure"	October 30, 1982
7	"The Puppy and the Reluctant Bull"	November 6, 1982
8	"The Puppy's Hong Kong Adventure"	November 13, 1982
9	"Honolulu Puppy"	November 20, 1982
10	"The Puppy's Great Escape"	November 27, 1982
11	"The Puppy's Great Race"	December 4, 1982
12	"The Puppy's Amazon Adventure"	December 11, 1982
13	"Petey and the 101 Seals"	December 18, 1982

== Voice cast ==
- Casey Kasem – Norville "Shaggy" Rogers
- Don Messick – Scooby-Doo, Scrappy-Doo, Yabba-Doo
- Frank Welker – Deputy Dusty
- Billy Jacoby – Petey the Puppy
- Nancy McKeon – Dolly
- Michael Bell – Duke, Dash
- Peter Cullen – Lucky

=== Additional voices ===
- Jack Angel
- Leon Askin
- Eric Aved
- Jered Barclay
- Dick Beals
- Jim Begg
- Ed Begley, Jr.
- Lucille Bliss
- Susan Blu
- Jerry Boyd
- Arthur Burghardt
- Howard Caine
- William Callaway
- Virginia Christine
- Philip L. Clarke
- Cathleen Cordell
- David Couwlier
- Candice Craig
- Keene Curtis
- Jack DeLeon
- Jerry Dexter
- Dago Dimster
- Alan Dinehart
- Jeff Doucette
- Hector Elias
- Richard Erdman
- Michael Evans
- Jere Fields
- Bernard Fox
- Pat Fraley
- Alejandro Garay
- Linda Gary
- Phil Hartman
- Johnny Haymer
- Darryl Hickman
- David Jolliffe
- Stanley Jones
- Jackie Joseph
- Kip King
- Corrine Kubelka
- Greg LaStrapes
- Patricia Lenz
- Keye Luke
- Tress MacNeille
- Laurie Main
- Danny Mann
- Mona Marshall
- Bill Martin
- Mitzi McCall
- Chuck McCann
- Edie McClurg
- Joe Medalis
- Julio Medina
- Tonyo Melendez
- Scott Menville
- Larry Moss
- Tony O'Dell
- Alan Oppenheimer
- Patricia Parris
- Clare Peck
- Stack Pierce
- Patrick Pinney
- Henry Polic II
- Gene Price
- Phil Proctor
- Peter Renaday
- Evan Richards
- Paul Ross
- Michael Rye
- Hank Saroyan
- Marilyn Schreffler
- Ted Schwartz
- Marla Scott
- R. J. Segall
- Pepe Serna
- Joe Silver
- John Stephenson
- Kris Stevens
- Andre Stojka
- Larry Storch
- Brian Tochi
- Fred Travalena
- Janet Waldo
- Lennie Weinrib
- Jimmy Weldon
- Alan Young
- Marian Zajac
- Ted Zeigler

== Crew ==
- Alan Dinehart - Recording Director
- Gordon Hunt - Recording Director

== See also ==
- List of Scooby-Doo media
