= Scooby-Doo! and the Monster of Mexico =

- DVD cover
- Directed by: Scott Jeralds
- Written by: Douglas Wood
- Based on: Scooby-Doo by Joe Ruby and Ken Spears
- Produced by: Margaret M. Dean; Scott Jeralds
- Starring: Frank Welker; Casey Kasem; Nicole Jaffe; Heather North Kenney
- Edited by: Joe Gall
- Music by: Rich Dickerson; Gigi Meroni
- Production company: Warner Bros. Animation
- Distributed by: Warner Home Video
- Release date: September 30, 2003
- Running time: 74 minutes
- Country: United States
- Language: English

Scooby-Doo! and the Monster of Mexico is a 2003 American direct-to-video animated adventure film; the sixth in a series of direct-to-video films based upon the Scooby-Doo Saturday morning cartoons. It was released on September 30, 2003, and it was produced by Warner Bros. Animation.

It is the second and final film (after Scooby-Doo! and the Legend of the Vampire) to briefly reunite the surviving or available voice cast from the original 1969 series, with Frank Welker voicing Scooby-Doo in place of the late Don Messick. The film also marks the last time Nicole Jaffe and Heather North voice Velma and Daphne, respectively, before North's death on November 29, 2017.

== Plot ==
Fred Jones' pen pal, Alejo Otero, invites him and Mystery Inc. to visit him and his family in Veracruz, Mexico, which is being terrorized by a monster that its citizens believe to be "El Chupacabra".

Upon their arrival, Mystery Inc. stay at the Otero family's struggling hotel and meet his wife Sofia, son Jorge, mother Doña Dolores, brother Luis, and Luis's American fiancée, Charlene. Over dinner, the Oteros are met by Diego Fuente, a business partner of Alejo and Luis's deceased father who wants to buy the hotel, but the Oteros refuse and send him off. Alejo later tells Mystery Inc. that El Chupacabra has been scaring potential patrons away.

Taking the case, Fred leads Mystery Inc. and the Otero brothers in searching for the monster. Despite finding a message written in Spanish on the gang's van, the Mystery Machine, warning them to stop investigating, the group continue, with Fred, Velma Dinkley, Daphne Blake, and the Otero brothers splitting up while Shaggy Rogers and his dog Scooby-Doo stay with the Mystery Machine, unaware that someone drained their brake fluid. While searching the woods, Fred, Velma, and Daphne encounter El Curandero, a medicine man, who tells them to research history and warns them that they are in grave danger while the Oteros are attacked by El Chupacabra. Despite lacking brakes, Shaggy and Scooby use the Mystery Machine to reunite with the others and save them from the monster before reaching a gas station.

After making repairs, the group travel to a local history museum, believing that this is what El Curandero meant. There, they meet a suspiciously hyperactive museum guide who leads them into a performance about ancient Mexican customs, during which Daphne is forcibly volunteered and kidnapped. Finding a secret passageway, the group follow it to Aztec pyramids, where they find Daphne and rescue her, only to be chased by tourists led by an animatronic eagle for seemingly desecrating the pyramids. Eventually, the group return to Veracruz to review the clues they found, such as the threat containing a grammatical error that a real Spanish speaker would not make.

The next day, the Day of the Dead, the group travel to the local cemetery, where Dolores informs them Charlene was kidnapped by El Chupacabra. As the Otero family give offerings to Alejo and Luis' father and hope for Charlene's safe return, they are seemingly visited by his ghost, who urges them to sell the hotel in English. Alejo is unconvinced while Fred discovers a good luck charm that Charlene gave Luis earlier is actually a tracking device and presses a button on it. Scooby and the Oteros' dog, Chiquita, track the subsequent beeping sound to a shed containing a man in a skeleton costume controlling the ghostly illusion. Upon capturing him, the group expose him as theme park owner Mr. Smiley, who they deduce masterminded the Chupacabra scheme to scare off Veracruz's citizens to build a new theme park and orchestrated the chaos at the pyramids to eliminate his competition.

Before Mystery Inc. can close the case, El Chupacabra attacks the group. However, they ensnare it in wiring and expose it as the tour guide, who reveals she was an actor at one of Smiley's theme parks, where they fell in love and concocted the Chupacabra scheme. Luis demands to know what happened to Charlene, but the guide claims she is gone and tells him to forget about her. When Luis begs his father's spirit for help, the Oteros discover the offerings have disappeared, except for Charlene's. A suspicious Velma then reveals the guide is actually Charlene, who intended to scam the Oteros out of their money after marrying Luis. Fuente arrives, revealing further that he knew of Smiley and Charlene's plot and was trying to warn the Oteros and Mystery Inc. Afterward, Smiley and Charlene are arrested while Mystery Inc. and the Oteros celebrate the Day of the Dead.

== Voice cast ==
- Frank Welker as Scooby-Doo, Fred Jones
- Casey Kasem as Shaggy Rogers
- Heather North as Daphne Blake
- Nicole Jaffe as Velma Dinkley
- Eddie Santiago as Alejo Otero
- Jesse Borrego as Luis Otero
- Candi Milo as Charlene/Museum Guide
- Rita Moreno as Doña Dolores
- Maria Canals as Sofia Otero / Old Woman
- Brandon Gonzalez as Jorge Otero
- Rip Taylor as Mr. Smiley / Ghost of Señor Otero
- Cástulo Guerra as Señor Fuente
- Benito Martinez as El Curandero
- Ted Cassidy as El Chupacabra (uncredited) (Note: Archived audio of Godzilla's roar from Hanna-Barbera's Godzilla TV series.)

== Home media ==
The film was released on VHS and DVD on September 30, 2003 by Warner Home Video.
