= Lost Mysteries =

Artwork series parodying Scooby Doo and horror franchises

- Scooby-Doo Lost Mysteries
- Artist: Travis Falligant

Lost Mysteries or Scooby-Doo Lost Mysteries is a series of artworks by artist Travis Falligant. The series functions as both a parody of Scooby-Doo and horror films.

== Origin ==
The early artworks simply portray the Scooby Gang coming across classic horror film characters (mostly slasher killers) drawn as to look like screenshots from the original Scooby-Doo, Where Are You! show, later images sometimes feature The New Scooby-Doo Movies style title screens with guest star like appearances from horror film personalities. The majority of the villains appearing come from more contemporary horror works such as Freddy Krueger from A Nightmare on Elm Street, Jason Voorhees from Friday the 13th, Michael Myers from Halloween, and the titular monster from It.

== Reception ==
A few pieces do not feature horror themes but instead controversial or provocative figures of entertainment, such as persons associated with exploitation films. (Note: Attributed to multiple sources.)

== See also ==
- List of Scooby-Doo, Where Are You! episodes
- List of The New Scooby-Doo Movies episodes
- Lists of horror film characters
