= Heather North =

American actress (1945–2017)

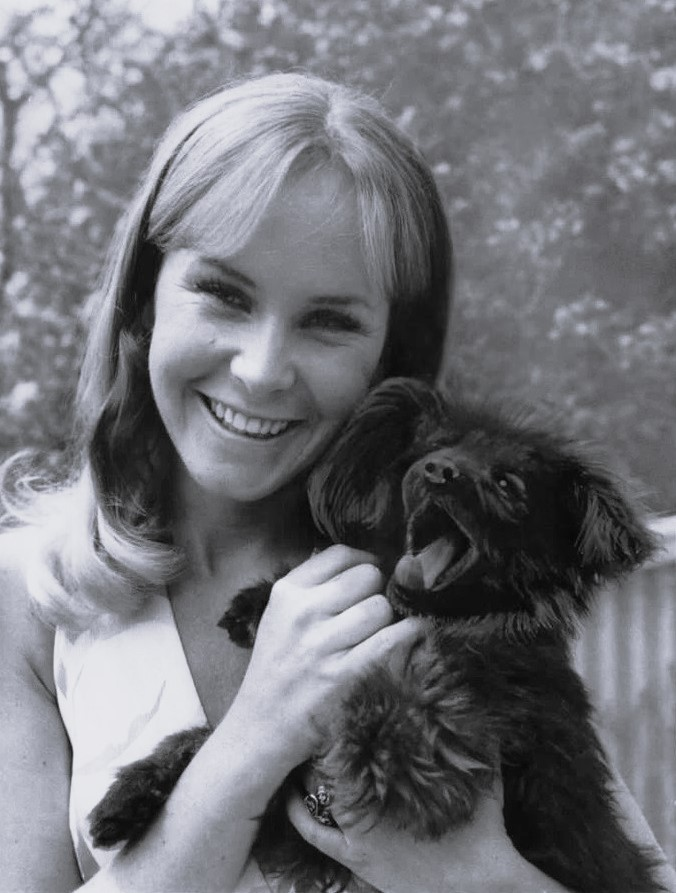
- North in Days of Our Lives (1973)
- Born: Heather May North; December 13, 1945; Pasadena, California, U.S.
- Died: November 29, 2017 (aged 71); Studio City, California, U.S.
- Other name: Heather North Kenney
- Occupation: Actress
- Years active: 1957–2003
- Spouse: H. Wesley Kenney (m. 1971; died 2015)

Heather May North (December 13, 1945 – November 29, 2017) was an American actress. She is known for voicing Daphne Blake in the Scooby-Doo franchise.

== Early years ==
North was born in Pasadena, California.

She was close with actress and voice talent Nicole Jaffe, the voice of Velma Dinkley in Scooby-Doo, before her retirement. The two were roommates in 1969 and Jaffe was the one who encouraged her to audition for Daphne Blake.

== Career ==
North made her acting debut at the age of 11.

Her first film role was in Git! (1965). She later guest starred on The Monkees and The Fugitive, both in 1966, and on Green Acres in 1968.

Though she appeared in several live-action films and TV shows, such as Jennifer Scott alongside Kurt Russell in the Disney film The Barefoot Executive (1971) and as Sandy Horton on Days of Our Lives from 1967 until 1972, she is largely remembered for her portrayal of Daphne Blake in the Scooby-Doo franchise. She took over the role from Stefanianna Christopherson in the second season of Scooby-Doo, Where Are You! and ultimately went on to voice the character in various installments of franchise for more than three decades.

== Personal life and death ==
North was married to H. Wesley Kenney, producer of the NBC daytime drama Days of Our Lives, from 1971 until his death in 2015.

North died of bronchiolitis on November 29, 2017, at her home in Studio City, California, at the age of 71.

== Filmography ==
Film and Television
Year	Title	Role	Notes
1963	My Three Sons	Sally	Episode: "Caged Fury"
1965	Karen	Carla	Episode: "Good Neighbor Policy"
1965	Mr. Novak	Felicia	Episode: "Faculty Follies: Part 2"
1965	Gidget	Pokey	Episode: "In God, and Nobody Else, We Trust"
1965	Paradise Bay	Kitty Morgan	Unknown episodes
1965	Git!	Elaine	Feature film
1967	The Fugitive	Marie Diamond	Episode: "The Breaking of the Habit"
1967	The Monkees	Wendy / Girl	Episode: "The Prince and the Paupers"
1967	My Three Sons	Gretchen	Episode: "My Son, the Bullfighter"
1967–72	Days of Our Lives	Sandy Horton	156 episodes
1969	Green Acres	Kathy Baxter	Episode: "Oliver's Schoolgirl Crush"
1970	Scooby-Doo, Where Are You!	Daphne Blake	Voice; 8 episodes (season 2)
1970	I Love My Wife	Betty	Feature film
1971	Love, American Style	Ellen	Episode: "Love and the Only Child" segment
1971	The Barefoot Executive	Jennifer Scott	Feature film
1971	Ironside	Lori Stockton	Episode: "Lesson in Terror"
1971	Adam-12	Shirley Young	Episode: "The Dinosaur"
1972	Ghost Story (aka Circle of Fear)	Dana Evans	Episode: Elegy for a Vampire
1972–73	The New Scooby-Doo Movies	Daphne Blake	Voice; 24 episodes
1973	The Wonderful World of Disney	Jennifer Scott	Episodes: "The Barefoot Executive" (Parts 1 & 2)
1974	Doc Elliot	Amy Oliver	Episode: "The Carrier"
1976	The Scooby-Doo/Dynomutt Hour	Daphne Blake	Voice; 16 episodes: Scooby-Doo, 3 episodes: Dynomutt
1976–78	The Scooby-Doo Show	Daphne Blake	Voice; 40 episodes 16 episodes – as part of "The Scooby-Doo/Dynomutt Hour" (1976); 8 episodes – as part of "Scooby's All-Star Laff-A-Lympics" (1977); 16 episodes – as and part of "Scooby's All-Stars" (1978)
1977–80	Captain Caveman and the Teen Angels	Loni (and others)	Voice; 39 episodes
1978	Dynomutt, Dog Wonder	Daphne Blake	Voice; Episodes: "Everyone Hyde!", "What Now, Lowbrow?", "The Wizard of Ooze"
1979	Scooby Goes Hollywood	Daphne Blake	Voice, Television special
1979–80	Scooby-Doo and Scrappy-Doo	Daphne Blake	Voice, 16 episodes
1983	The New Scooby and Scrappy-Doo Show	Daphne Blake	Voice; 13 episodes (26 segments)
1984	The New Scooby-Doo Mysteries	Daphne Blake	Voice; 13 episodes (26 segments)
1985	The 13 Ghosts of Scooby-Doo	Daphne Blake	Voice; 13 episodes
1985–86	Scooby's Mystery Funhouse	Daphne Blake	Voice; 21 episodes (various segments: reruns of Scooby & Scrappy-Doo shorts)
1997	Johnny Bravo	Daphne Blake	Voice; Episode: "Bravo Dooby Doo"
2003	Scooby-Doo! and the Legend of the Vampire	Daphne Blake	Voice; Direct-to-video
2003	Scooby-Doo! and the Monster of Mexico	Daphne Blake	Voice; Direct-to-video (Final role)

Preceded by Indira Stefanianna Christopherson	Voice of Daphne Blake; 1970–1985	Succeeded by Kellie Martin
Preceded by Kellie Martin	Voice of Daphne Blake; 1997–2003	Succeeded by Mary Kay Bergman
