= Scoobynatural =

- Supernatural episode
- Episode no.: Season 13; Episode 16
- Directed by: Robert Singer (live-action); Spike Brandt (animation)
- Written by: Jim Krieg; Jeremy Adams
- Cinematography by: Serge Ladouceur (live-action)
- Editing by: Donald L. Koch (live-action)
- Production code: T13.20566
- Original air date: March 29, 2018
- Running time: 42 minutes

Episode chronology
← Previous "A Most Holy Man"	Next → "The Thing"
- Supernatural season 13

"Scoobynatural" is the 16th episode of the 13th season of the paranormal drama series Supernatural, and the 280th episode overall. The episode was written by Jim Krieg and Jeremy Adams and directed in live-action by executive producer Robert Singer and in animation by Spike Brandt. It is the only Supernatural episode to be mostly animated, with animation produced by Warner Bros. Animation. It was first broadcast on March 29, 2018, on The CW. In the episode, Sam, Dean, and Castiel are sucked into the animated world of Scooby-Doo and must help the Scooby Gang solve a mystery when a real ghost crashes the events of the 1970 Scooby-Doo, Where Are You! episode "A Night of Fright Is No Delight".

The four current voice actors who appear in current Scooby-Doo media reprise their roles for the episode: Frank Welker as Scooby-Doo and Fred Jones, Matthew Lillard as Shaggy Rogers, Grey DeLisle as Daphne Blake, and Kate Micucci as Velma Dinkley.

The episode received critical acclaim for its humor, meta references, sense of nostalgia, and the natural fit between the two series.

== Plot ==
After stopping a plush dinosaur that comes to life in a pawn shop and attacks, the grateful owner gives Dean a new TV for free. While testing out the TV, the Winchesters are sucked into Dean's favorite episode ("A Night of Fright Is No Delight") of Scooby-Doo, Where Are You!, followed soon after by Castiel. To the group's shock, they discover an actual ghost that begins killing people (including the real culprit Cosgood Creeps) and the Winchesters and the Scooby Gang are forced to team up together to stop it. Working together, the Winchesters and the Scooby Gang trap the ghost, who reveals himself to be a young boy who is being used by a greedy real estate developer in the real world to scare away reluctant shop owners. The ghost helps the Winchesters and Castiel fool the Scooby Gang into thinking that it was a human villain with the ghost boy turning into Cosgood Creeps before returning the Winchesters and Castiel to the real world. There, the three put the ghost to rest and get the criminal arrested for tax evasion. Before getting sucked into Scooby-Doo, Castiel is shown to have gotten the fruit from the Tree of Life, bringing the Winchesters one step closer to their goal of opening a portal to Apocalypse World.

== Production ==
The idea of a crossover episode with Scooby-Doo had been discussed by the writers and producers of Supernatural for several years. The ability to do a crossover was made possible because the rights to both shows are owned by Warner Bros.

== Reception ==
The episode received critical acclaim. In her review for Den of Geek, Bridget LaMonica gave the episode a score of 5/5, calling it a "milestone" and "a shameless dose of humor and nostalgia that found a way to blend two tonally different series." Samantha Highfill of EW echoed the sentiment and gave the episode an "A" grade, adding that "No other show could do this and do it so well." Kaitlin Thomas of TVGuide compared the episode favorably to past meta-installments "Changing Channels" and "The French Mistake" and said that it "is destined to become an instant classic."
