= Nicole Jaffe =

Canadian talent agent and actress (b. 1941)

- Born: Nicole Jaffe; May 23, 1941 (age 85); Montreal, Quebec, Canada
- Occupation: Actress
- Years active: 1968–1986, 2002–2004
- Known for: Original voice actress for Velma Dinkley in the Scooby-Doo franchise
- Spouses: Brad David (m. 1969; div. 1979); Brian Braff (m. 1982; died 2025)

Nicole Cowgill Jaffe David (née Jaffe; born May 23, 1941) is a Canadian businesswoman, consultant, former talent agent and entertainment executive, and actress, best known as the original voice actress for Velma Dinkley in Hanna-Barbera's Scooby-Doo franchise. Today, she advises major brands and organizations, works with family foundations, serves on nonprofit boards, and remains active in entertainment through select projects.

== Biography ==
In 1969, Jaffe married Actors Studio classmate Brad David at the age of 28.

As a performer, billed under her maiden name of Nicole Jaffe, she appeared in The Trouble with Girls (1969) with Elvis Presley and Scooby-Doo voice actor Frank Welker, and in Disney's The Love Bug (1968). She also starred in a stage production of You're a Good Man, Charlie Brown as Patty, where she was seen by Hanna-Barbera recording director Gordon Hunt, who auditioned her for and eventually cast her as Velma on the Scooby-Doo, Where Are You! Saturday morning cartoon series.

During the second season of Scooby-Doo, in 1970, after Indira Stefanianna, who voiced Daphne on Scooby-Doo, left the show, Jaffe recommended her roommate Heather North as a replacement; North voiced Daphne in various Scooby productions for the next three decades. Velma was Jaffe's only voice role, which she reprised in the spin-off series The New Scooby-Doo Movies (1972–74). During this time, Nicole also appeared in a starring role in the Room 222 second season episode "What Would We Do Without Bobbie?" in 1970.

Jaffe retired from acting in 1973 and went into talent representation. Under her marital name – Nicole David – she and Arnold Rifkin formed the Rifkin/David agency in 1982, which was merged two years later into the Triad Artists agency. Triad was sold to the larger William Morris Agency in 1992 for over $20 million. David worked as a senior agent and senior vice president at William Morris and its successor William Morris Endeavor until 2013; her clients over the years have included John Travolta, Whitney Houston, Lauryn Hill, Rihanna, and Elijah Wood.

She occasionally returned to the Scooby-Doo franchise from 1977 through 2003, concluding with two direct-to-video movies: Scooby-Doo! and the Legend of the Vampire and Scooby-Doo! and the Monster of Mexico.

Nicole David was divorced from Brad David in 1979 (she kept her marital name). She then married L.A. photographer Brian Braff in 1982. Subsequently, Braff founded the charity group for teens and young adults who have cancer, High School Yearbook: A Teen & Young Adult Cancer Community. David served on the charity's board of directors.

== Filmography ==
Year	Title	Role	Notes
1968	The Love Bug	Girl In Dune-buggy	
1969	The Trouble with Girls	Betty	Co-starred with fellow Scooby-Doo voice actor Frank Welker who played the character Rutgers
1969	Marlowe	Lilly	Uncredited
1969–1970	Scooby-Doo, Where Are You!	Velma Dinkley (voice)	25 episodes
1969–1970	Room 222	Bobbie Walstone, Student in Pete's Class	2 episodes
1971	The Bold Ones: The New Doctors	Hot Pants	Episode: "Broken Melody"
1972–1973	The New Scooby-Doo Movies	Velma Dinkley (voice)	24 episodes
1976	Dynomutt, Dog Wonder	Damsel Woman In Distress (voice)	Episode: "The Wizard of Ooze"
1977–1980	Captain Caveman and the Teen Angels	Additional voices	38 episodes
1978	The Scooby-Doo/Dynomutt Hour	Additional voices	Episode: "The Creepy Case of Old Iron Face"
1979–1982	Scooby-Doo and Scrappy-Doo	Additional voices	3 episodes
1983	The New Scooby-Doo Mysteries	Additional voices	Episode: "The Mark Of Scooby/The Crazy Carnival Caper"
1983	The New Scooby and Scrappy-Doo Show	Additional voices	Episode: "Wedding Bell Boos!"
1986	Scooby's Mystery Funhouse	Additional voices	1 episode
2003	Scooby-Doo! and the Legend of the Vampire	Velma Dinkley (voice)	
2003	Scooby-Doo! and the Monster of Mexico	Velma Dinkley (voice)	Final role

Preceded by None	Voice of Velma Dinkley; 1969–1973, 2003	Succeeded by Pat Stevens
