= Star Crystal =

- New World Video Cover
- Directed by: Lance Lindsay
- Written by: Lance Lindsay; Eric Woster
- Produced by: Eric Woster
- Starring: C. Juston Campbell; Emily Longstreth; Faye Bolt; John W. Smith; Taylor Kingsley; Marcia Linn
- Cinematography: Robert Caramico
- Edited by: Eric Woster
- Music by: Doug Katsaros
- Distributed by: New World Pictures
- Release date: April 1986
- Running time: 91 minutes
- Country: United States
- Language: English

Star Crystal is a 1986 American horror science fiction film directed by Lance Lindsay. The film stars C. Juston Campbell and Faye Bolt as a pair of astronauts who must survive against a mysterious alien lifeform seeking to kill them, while also facing dwindling supplies aboard their damaged shuttlecraft.

== Plot ==
In 2032, a crewed expedition to Mars discovers a mysterious egg buried under the planet's surface and brings it to their ship, the SC-37. While the astronauts are away, the egg hatches, releasing a crystal and a slimy alien creature. The astronauts conduct experiments on the crystal and the alien, and are soon killed when their air supply is shut off.

Two months later, the SC-37 is intercepted by the space station L-5, which subsequently is destroyed by a malfunctioning neutron reactor. A ragtag repair crew escape aboard the damaged ship, and the dire situation forces them to work together despite their differences. The crew of five conclude that they lack the supplies necessary to return to Earth or await rescue, and decide to stop at a pair of supply stations to remedy this. Meanwhile, the alien hides in the engine room and quickly begins killing the crew. Soon, only two, Roger Campbell and Dr. Adrian Kimberly, remain. As Roger and Adrian lock the alien out of the bridge, it retreats back to the engine room with the crystal. Roger and Adrian find data from the original crew's experiments in the ship's computer, Bernice, indicating that the alien rapidly matures and grows in intelligence, while the crystal is an advanced computer the alien uses when confronted with a problem. Using the crystal, the alien hacks into and takes control of the ship, cutting off their communications and tricking another nearby ship into believing SC-37 does not require rescue. During a subsequent meteor storm that endangers the ship, the alien uses the crystal to project a force field until the storm passes. Roger is forced to enter the lab to retrieve a crate of rations, but when he returns to the bridge without threatening the alien, it lets him go. Soon after, the alien begins reading data on the evolution of the human race and a Bible stored in Bernice's memory.

Roger and Adrian decide to continue on to the first supply station, Alpha-7, but Bernice informs them that they will need to repair the engine for this to be feasible. Realizing they must confront the alien, they go the engine room, where it reveals itself to them. Much to their shock, it apologizes profusely for its actions, claiming that it was killing in self defense until realizing that humans were not as dangerous as it first thought. Identifying itself as GAR, it surrenders control of the ship back to Roger and Adrian, who forgive it and strike a bargain: after they reach the safety of Alpha-7, they will give SC-37 to GAR so it can return to its home planet. The trio work together and repair the ship, quickly forming a friendship with each other despite their initial conflict.

SC-37 docks at Alpha-7, and Roger helps GAR load rations in preparation for its voyage. However, a gravity tunnel soon opens; this anomaly can help Roger and Adrian return to Earth, but they must immediately depart aboard the SC-37 to make the trip. GAR realizes that it must part ways with the humans and thanks them, saying that it will always cherish their brief time as friends. Bidding them a sad farewell, GAR uses the crystal to convert Alpha-7 into a ship and sets off for its planet, while Roger and Adrian finally make it back to Earth.

== Cast ==
- C. Juston Campbell as Roger Campbell
- Emily Longstreth as Sherrie Stevens
- Faye Bolt as Dr. Adrian Kimberly
- John W. Smith as Cal
- Taylor Kingsley as Sherrie Stevens
- Marcia Linn as Lt. Billi Lynn
- The Gling as the voice of GAR

== Production ==
Star Crystal marked Eric Woster's first time working as an independent producer after serving as a production assistant on The Shining and the Cheech & Chong films Nice Dreams and Things Are Tough All Over. The film was designed to be mash-up of E.T. the Extra-Terrestrial and Alien that would be done on a frugal budget in order to appeal to New World Pictures once filming had wrapped. Production began in 1983. As Woster was a devout Christian, he worked some aspects of Christian doctrine into the film's story with the creature's face turn motivated by its exposure to the Gospels of Matthew, Luke, and Mark when it takes over the ships computers.

Director Lance Lindsay called the film "the worst nightmare I've ever gone through" citing a myriad of production problems that affected Star Crystal such as Woster needing to edit the film himself due to the Newport Beach based investors refusing to sink anymore money into the production, one of the leading men being stricken with severe fever that lost seven of the planned twelve shooting days, and one actor developing ego problems and refusing to return to the set when needed. Special effects coordinator Lewis Abernathy accused Lindsay of looking for scapegoats and said the problems with the film stemmed from Lindsay's ineptitude as a director and screenwriter.

=== Effects ===
According to Abernathy, the initial storyboard storyboards depicting the space station called for an elaborate design resembling a Bicycle wheel, but as a convincing effect would've called for a mixture of models needed for wide shots and close-ups, Abernathy instead jerry rigged a model out of a Sparkletts water bottle and a piece of PVC pipe which he then convinced a friend to detail for $200. Initially, Woster had commissioned a separate team to build the space craft to be used in the film, but after seeing the end result it was deemed inadequate and it was decided to purchase a spacecraft model previously used in one of Roger Corman's films.

The creature was built by Woster in his bedroom using BFGoodrich material and condoms for the creature's irises. Lindsay was dissatisfied with the end result of the creature describing the final model as resembling a "melted candle". The creature had 27 separate head movements and required 14 operators to work it.

Abernathy stated the effects in the film cost approximately $5,000, but Woster contradicted this statement stating the cost was $10,000.

== Music ==
The film's score was composed by Doug Katsaros. The song featured in its end credits, "Crystal of a Star," was written by Katsaros with lyrics and vocals by Stefani Christopherson.

== Release ==
=== Theatrical ===
Star Crystal was released in theaters in April 1986.

=== Home media ===
On June 24, 2003 Star Crystal was released for the first time on DVD in Widescreen by Anchor Bay Entertainment. Kino Lorber later issued it on DVD and Blu-ray on July 11, 2017.

== See also ==
- List of films featuring space stations
- List of films set on Mars
