= Rising Son (film) =

1990 television film

- Video cover
- Genre: Drama
- Screenplay by: Bill Phillips
- Story by: Bill Phillips; Rafael Yglesias; Lewis Cole
- Directed by: John David Coles
- Starring: Brian Dennehy; Piper Laurie; Matt Damon
- Country of origin: United States
- Original language: English

Production
- Producers: Fred Berner; John Landgraf; David Manson
- Cinematography: Sandi Sissel
- Running time: 92 minutes
- Production companies: Sarabande Productions; Turner Pictures

Original release
- Network: TNT
- Release: July 23, 1990

Rising Son is a 1990 American made-for-television drama directed by John David Coles and starring Brian Dennehy, Piper Laurie and Matt Damon.

== Plot ==
Gus Robinson (Brian Dennehy) is a man defined by his demanding presence as both husband and father. His life has been one of grueling labor in a thankless factory, where he climbed to the position of foreman. However, his world is upended when the factory is acquired by a Japanese corporation, resulting in his abrupt layoff in his sixties. Gus, fueled by deep-seated insecurities and unfulfilled aspirations, has exerted a domineering influence over his wife and pushed his two sons to achieve the success he himself never attained.

His older son, Des, (Tate Donovan), a lawyer trapped in a life he despises, sees the facade of success he's built as a hollow attempt to please his father. He implores his younger brother, Charlie (Matt Damon), to break free from Gus's control and forge his own path before their father's destructive tendencies consume him. Charlie, meanwhile, grapples with his own profound identity crisis. He has secretly abandoned his pre-med studies, navigates complex romantic relationships, and is deeply troubled by his parents' precarious situation and his father's treatment of his submissive mother, Martha (Piper Laurie).

Gus's unemployment triggers a devastating spiral. He is unable to secure stable work, and his long-suppressed feelings of failure and inadequacy erupt. His humiliation deepens when Martha is forced to take a job to support the family, a move he perceives as a direct threat to his authority. He resents her newfound independence.

The tension culminates in a volatile confrontation when Charlie finally confronts his father with the harsh truths Gus has long ignored.

== Cast ==
- Brian Dennehy as Gus Robinson
- Piper Laurie as Martha Robinson
- Matt Damon as Charlie Robinson
- Tate Donovan as Des Robinson
- Jane Adams as Meg Bradley
- Graham Beckel as Billy
- Emily Longstreth as Carol
- Ving Rhames as Ed
- Richard Jenkins as Tommy
- Earl Hindman as Victor
- Kevin Corrigan as Danny
- Kathryn Roth as Anchorwoman
- Mary Nell Santacroce as Marge
- Ray McKinnon as Ken Mott
- Pamela Garmon as Marion
- Jill Jane Clementsas Interviewer
- Al Hamacher as Husband
- Jan Mari as Wife

== Reception ==
Critics praised Dennehy's performance, with a New York Times review saying that his performance "subtly captures all the rough edges and subtle colorings" of his character, and declaring that "Laurie, Damon and the rest of the cast is perfectly on target."

The film marked an early appearance for young actors Matt Damon, Jane Adams, Ving Rhames, Tate Donovan, and Kevin Corrigan.
