= Emily Longstreth =

American actress and model (1967–2014)

- Born: Emily Lene Longstreth; January 5, 1967; Orange County, California, U.S.
- Died: January 14, 2014 (aged 47); New York City, New York, U.S.
- Occupations: Actress, Model
- Years active: 1984–1995

Emily Lene Longstreth (January 5, 1967 – January 14, 2014) was an American actress and model who appeared in several film and television productions throughout the 1980s and early 1990s. She is best known for her roles in the teen romantic comedy Pretty in Pink (1986), the Christopher Guest Hollywood satire The Big Picture (1989), and the resort comedy Private Resort (1985).

Following her final film appearance in 1994, Longstreth retired from acting due to severe health issues and lived the remainder of her life out of the public eye.

== Early life and modeling career ==
Longstreth was born in Orange County, California, to John Preston Longstreth and Helen Lenee Corn. She grew up in Southern California alongside her older brother, Eric. Characterized in early casting portfolios by her heart-shaped face, light blue eyes, and long wavy blonde hair, she began working as a commercial print model during her teenage years.

In 1984, she transitioned into on-camera screen work after being cast as "Suzie" in the heavy-rotation MTV music video for the rock band Y&T's single "Don't Stop Runnin". The visibility of the music video led directly to her first theatrical film auditions in Los Angeles.

== Career ==
=== Acting ===
Longstreth made her feature film debut in the 1984 beach comedy Hardbodies, quickly followed by a supporting role as a dance squad member in Gimme an 'F' (1984). In 1985, she secured her first major co-starring role as Patti in the teen comedy Private Resort, playing the primary romantic interest opposite Johnny Depp. That same year, she starred as Bobbie Ann in the ensemble independent comedy American Drive-In.

In 1986, Longstreth appeared as Kate in the John Hughes-penned teen film Pretty in Pink. She pivoted to dramatic television later that year, portraying real-life serial killer survivor Carol DaRonch in the acclaimed two-part NBC miniseries The Deliberate Stranger. For production and privacy reasons, her character's name was altered to "Susan Delgato" in the broadcast script. She concluded 1986 by starring as Rebecca in the post-apocalyptic independent action film Wired to Kill.

Longstreth's most critically acclaimed role came in Christopher Guest's 1989 directorial debut, The Big Picture. She portrayed Susan Rawlings, the grounded and loyal girlfriend of an aspiring filmmaker played by Kevin Bacon. Her performance was noted for serving as the moral, earnest foil to the manipulative starlet character played by Teri Hatcher.

In 1990, she appeared in the television courtroom drama Too Young to Die? alongside Juliette Lewis and Brad Pitt, followed by a role in the television movie Rising Son with Matt Damon. She made her final professional screen appearance as Corina in the 1994 independent feature Confessions of a Hitman before abruptly retiring from the entertainment industry at the age of 28.

== Personal life and health ==
Following her departure from Hollywood in 1995, it was disclosed by family members that Longstreth had been diagnosed with bipolar disorder and paranoid schizophrenia in her mid-20s, which ultimately prevented her from maintaining a professional acting schedule. (Note: According to her former sister-in-law her brother's Eric ex-wife explained that Emily developed severe schizophrenia, which contributed to her disappearing entirely from public life and cutting ties with her past.)

She resided briefly at the Golden Gate Lodge, a residential board-and-care facility in West Los Angeles, before relocating permanently to New York City. Due to the severe progression of her condition, she lived heavily detached from her former life, spending more than a decade residing primarily within New York municipal shelter systems. (Note: According to her former sister-in-law her brother's Eric ex-wife and her cousin Matthew Longstreth revealed that Emily moved to New York City and spent over 10 years living in homeless shelters while sharing apartments with various roommates.)

== Death ==
Longstreth's family experienced several consecutive tragedies. Her mother, who later converted to Buddhism and legally changed her name to Lene Corn Wangmo, died in Las Vegas, Nevada, in 2013. Her older brother, Eric John Longstreth, predeceased both Emily and his parents, passing away in July 2012 at the age of 47. Her father, John Preston Longstreth, survived most of his immediate family before passing away in Texas in April 2022. She is survived by one brother, Victor Longstreth.

Longstreth died quietly in New York in 2014 at the age of 47.

== Filmography ==
=== Television ===
Year	Title	Role	Notes
1986	The Deliberate Stranger	Susan Delgato	Television miniseries (2 episodes)
1986	Slow Burn	Pam Draper	Television movie
1987	Tonight's the Night	Kim	Television movie
1987	Into the Homeland	Ember Swallow	HBO Television movie
1989	Flying Blind	Ramona	Television movie
1990	Too Young to Die?	Jean Glessner	Television movie
1990	Rising Son	Carol	Television movie

=== Film ===
Year	Title	Role	Notes
1984	Hardbodies	Girl on Skates	Debut
1984	Last Chance Dance	Alicia	Short film
1984	Gimme an 'F'	Falcons Dance Squad Member	
1985	Private Resort	Patti	Co-starring role
1985	American Drive-In	Bobbie Ann	
1986	Pretty in Pink	Kate	
1986	Star Crystal	Sherrie Stevens	
1986	Wired to Kill	Rebecca	Alternate title: Booby Trap
1989	The Big Picture	Susan Rawlings	
1994	Confessions of a Hitman	Corina	Final film role

=== Music videos ===
Year	Title	Artist	Role	Notes
1984	"Don't Stop Runnin"	Y&T	Suzie	

== Legacy ==
In 2025, singer-songwriter Ruby Friedman dedicated her song "When the Hangman...", from the Ruby Friedman Orchestra album Chimes After Midnight, to Longstreth. She revealed that she watched a 1980s audition reel of Longstreth which inspired her album's overarching theme of honoring overlooked artists who faded from public view.
