= Private Resort =

1985 film by George Bowers

- Theater poster
- Directed by: George Bowers
- Screenplay by: Gordon Mitchell
- Story by: Ken Segall; Alan Wenkus; Gordon Mitchell
- Produced by: Don Enright; R. Ben Efraim
- Starring: Rob Morrow; Johnny Depp; Emily Longstreth; Tony Azito; Dody Goodman; Leslie Easterbrook; Hector Elizondo
- Cinematography: Adam Greenberg
- Edited by: Samuel D. Pollard
- Production company: Delphi III Productions
- Distributed by: Tri-Star Pictures
- Release date: May 3, 1985
- Running time: 82 minutes
- Country: United States
- Language: English
- Box office: $331,816 (United States)

Private Resort is a 1985 American adventure comedy film directed by George Bowers, and written by Gordon Mitchell, Ken Segall and Alan Wenkus. The film starred Rob Morrow, Johnny Depp, Emily Longstreth, Hector Elizondo, Dody Goodman, Tony Azito and Leslie Easterbrook.

Private Resort was the third in a series of comic teen sex romps from producer R. Ben Efraim, each of which had the word Private in the title. The previous two films were Private Lessons and Private School.

== Plot ==
Jack Marshall and Ben are college buddies at a posh Miami resort where they are weekend guests. The Maestro, a jewel thief, is pursuing the diamond necklace of society woman Amanda Rawlings. When they accidentally run afoul of the Maestro, Jack and Ben suddenly have their hands full.

== Cast ==
- Rob Morrow as Ben
- Johnny Depp as Jack Marshall
- Emily Longstreth as Patti
- Karyn O'Bryan as Dana Rawlings
- Hector Elizondo as The Maestro
- Dody Goodman as Amanda Rawlings
- Leslie Easterbrook as Bobbie Sue
- Tony Azito as Reeves
- Andrew Dice Clay as Curt
- Hilary Shapiro as Shirley
- Michael Bowen as Scott
- Greg Wynne as Mike
- Ron House as Nagel
- Susan Mechsner as Instructor
- Lisa London as Alice
- Nora Gaye as Kelly
- Lucy Lee Flippin as Wanda
- Jonathan Prince as Fred
- Raymond Forchion as Bartender

== See also ==
- List of American films of 1985
