= Wired to Kill =

- Directed by: Frank Schaeffer
- Written by: Frank Schaeffer
- Starring: Devin Hoelscher; Emily Longstreth; Merritt Butrick
- Cinematography: Tom Fraser
- Music by: Russell Ferrante
- Production company: Schaeffer-Buchfuehrer Productions
- Release date: November 14, 1986
- Running time: 96 min.
- Country: United States
- Language: English
- Budget: $3.8 million

Wired to Kill, also known as Booby Trap, is a 1986 film written and directed by Frank Schaeffer and starring Emily Longstreth, Devin Hoelscher, and Merritt Butrick.

== Plot ==
In the near future, law and order breaks down, diseases, violence and immorality are rampant. However, when a violent gang attacks a family nearly killing the mother and the authorities offer no aid, Steve, the teenage son, his girlfriend Rebecca, and a robot named Winston take matters into their own hands and get revenge on the gang amid the ruins of Los Angeles.

== Cast ==
- Emily Longstreth as Rebecca
- Devin Hoelscher as Steve
- Merritt Butrick as Reegus, The Gang Leader
- Frank Collison as "Sly"
- Tommy Lister Jr. as "Sleet"
- Kim Milford as "Rooster"
- Michael Wollet as "Zero"
- Garth Gardner as "Loady"
- Kristina David as Sandra, The mother
- Don Blakely as Police Sergeant

== Production ==
In May 1985, it was announced Frank Schaeffer would make his feature directorial debut with Booby Trap having previously worked as a producer on fundamentalist Christian documentaries such as How Should We Then Live? and Whatever Happened to the Human Race?. Much of the filming was done around an abandoned steel mill in Fontana, California that served as the gang's hideout and much of the setting's deteriorating landscape.
