= Gimme an 'F' =

1984 film by Jim Hart

- Theatrical release poster
- Directed by: Paul Justman
- Written by: Jim Hart
- Produced by: Gary Barber; Dylan Sellers
- Starring: Stephen Shellen; Mark Keyloun; Jennifer Cooke; Lisa Wilcox; Emily Longstreth
- Music by: Bob Gaudio; Jan Hammer
- Distributed by: 20th Century Fox
- Release date: November 16, 1984
- Running time: 90 minutes
- Country: United States
- Language: English

Gimme an 'F' is a 1984 sex comedy film written by Jim Hart and directed by Paul Justman. The film stars John Karlen, Stephen Shellen, Mark Keyloun, Jennifer Cooke, Emily Longstreth and Lisa Wilcox in a short role. It was also released under the titles T & A Academy 2 and Cheerballs (West Germany).

== Plot ==
The plot centers on competition between high-school cheerleading squads—and one squad, in particular, the Moline Ducks, is poor. The competition takes place at a camp run by middle-aged Bucky Berkshire aka Dr. Spirit (John Karlen), who this year decides to place a bet with his best instructor Tom Hamilton (Stephen Shellen) that he cannot make the woeful Ducks into a team that can beat the top-rated Falcons. If Berkshire loses, he pays up $10,000, and if Hamilton loses, he has to work another five years at the camp. Bucky Berkshire actually cannot stand Hamilton's antics, or his sexual but successful way of motivating the cheerleaders. However, a visiting group of wealthy Japanese businessmen will not finance Bucky's latest business plan without Hamilton on board to teach the cheerleaders. Thus, there is an ulterior motive behind Bucky's wager. As the teams get ready for their rounds of competition, several dance sequences, various teen pranks, and the usual sexual situations common in teen comedies weave their way through the storyline. Ultimately, the competition, and the day, are won when the formerly awkward Ducks, with a little help from a disqualified team, the Demons, wow the crowd with a sexy, explosive routine.

== Cast ==
- John Karlen as Bucky Berkshire
- Stephen Shellen as Tommy Hamilton
- Mark Keyloun as Roscoe McGuinn
- Jennifer Cooke as Pam Bethlehem
- Emily Longstreth as Falcons Dance Squad Member
- Lisa Wilcox as Demons Dance Squad Member
