= List of Scooby-Doo, Where Are You! episodes =

This is a list of episodes from Scooby-Doo, Where Are You!, an American Saturday-morning cartoon created by Joe Ruby and Ken Spears and produced by Hanna-Barbera Productions.

A total of 41 episodes were produced and aired on CBS (for seasons 1–2) and ABC (for season 3) across three seasons from September 13, 1969 to December 23, 1978.

== Series overview ==
Season	Episodes	Originally released		
Season	Episodes	First released	Last released	Network
1	17	September 13, 1969	January 17, 1970	CBS
2	8	September 12, 1970	October 31, 1970	CBS
3	16	September 9, 1978	December 23, 1978	ABC

== Episodes ==
=== Season 1 (1969–70) ===
No. overall	No. in season	Title	Villain	Identity of the Villain	Original release date	Prod. code
1	1	"What a Night for a Knight"	Black Knight	Mr. Wickles	September 13, 1969	45–1
On their way home from the movie theater, Shaggy and Scooby-Doo discover a black suit of armor, being delivered to the local museum from England, in an abandoned pickup truck. After informing Fred, Daphne, and Velma, they deliver it to the museum themselves. Later that night, they break into the museum to search for some clues, after learning that the archaeologist transporting the suit is missing. They find out that the black knight's armor comes to life by the light of a full moon.
2	2	"A Clue for Scooby-Doo"	Ghost of Captain Cutler	Captain Cutler	September 20, 1969	45–3
The gang's beach party gets interrupted by a ghost in a glowing deep sea-diving suit, who they think is connected with the disappearance of several yachts. This leads them underwater, to an area known as "The Graveyard of Ships" where they again run into the mysterious ghost diver.
3	3	"Hassle in the Castle"	Vazquez Castle Phantom	Bluestone the Great	September 27, 1969	45–2
The Mystery Inc. gang goes on a boating excursion, but they get lost in a fog and crash their boat on the mysterious Haunted Isle. They decide to venture to the abandoned Vázquez Castle on the island to seek help, but encounter a transparent phantom running around, who warns them to leave the island and never return.
4	4	"Mine Your Own Business"	Miner 49er	Hank	October 4, 1969	45–4
Thanks to Shaggy reading the map upside-down, the sleuths end up at Gold City, an old mining town in the California desert. They meet Hank the Caretaker, who tells them that it's haunted by a miner from 1849, who is said to wander the mine shaft looking for the last vein of gold.
5	5	"Decoy for a Dognapper"	Indian Witch Doctor	Buck Masters	October 11, 1969	45–5
When a series of local dognappings alarm prize-winning animal trainer Buck Masters, the Mystery Inc. gang offers to have Scooby pose as a decoy to catch the dognapper. However, their plan backfires as Scooby is taken, leading the gang to find out that the dognapper appears to be under the command of a vengeful Indian witch doctor.
6	6	"What the Hex Going On?"	Ghost of Elias Kingston	Stuart Wetherby	October 18, 1969	45–6
The gang pays a visit to their friend Sharon Wetherby, whose Uncle Stuart is cursed by the ghost of Elias Kingston. When Uncle Stuart disappears completely, the gang ventures into the abandoned and allegedly haunted Kingston Mansion next door, in search of him and Elias.
7	7	"Never Ape an Ape Man"	Ape Man	Carl the Stuntman	October 25, 1969	45–7
The gang get their jobs as extras on the set of a new motion picture entitled The Ape Man of Forbidden Mountain. Directed by Daphne's Uncle John, this feature film is based on the legend of an ape-man. However, the legend soon becomes reality; and the ape man terrorizes the set.
8	8	"Foul Play in Funland"	Robot	Charlie the Robot controlled by Sarah Jenkins	November 1, 1969	45–8
Mystery, Inc. notices that a seaside amusement park appears to be operating automatically, so they decide to investigate. They soon discover that an iron robot named Charlie is wreaking havoc. However, when they notify the caretaker (Mr. Jenkins), he and his sister rebuff them and show no interest in helping to solve the mystery. The gang finds the culprit behind the goings-on and Charlie is returned to normal.
9	9	"The Backstage Rage"	Puppet Master	Mr. Pietro	November 8, 1969	45–9
While taking home some leftovers from a pizza parlor, Shaggy and Scooby-Doo come across a violin case filled with counterfeit money. While Scooby gets distracted by a female dog puppet, the violin case is stolen. Shaggy, Scooby, and the rest of Mystery, Inc. find a string puppet controller at the scene of the crime and meet the doorman. They follow it to the local theater, where they uncover a counterfeiting operation, supervised by a spooky-looking puppet master.
10	10	"Bedlam in the Big Top"	Ghost Clown	Harry the Hypnotist	November 15, 1969	45–10
Mystery, Inc. encounters a midget and a strongman, both on the run from a circus that's allegedly haunted by a ghost clown. They head for the circus grounds to investigate, where Daphne, Shaggy and Scooby fall victim to the clown's powers of hypnotism.
11	11	"A Gaggle of Galloping Ghosts"	Wolfman, Count Dracula, Frankenstein's Monster, and Carlotta the Gypsy	Big Bob Oakley	November 22, 1969	45–11
While on their way to Franken Castle, Mystery Inc. stops by to have their fortunes told. The strange gypsy warns them that "they will meet their doom" if they head for the castle. Scooby and the gang head there anyway, where they are confronted by Count Dracula, Frankenstein's monster, and the Wolfman.
12	12	"Scooby-Doo and a Mummy, Too"	Mummy of Ankha	Dr. Najib	November 29, 1969	45–12
While visiting the museum to consult the professor and his assistant Dr Najib, Mystery, Inc. learns about the legend of Ankha, a 3,000-year-old Egyptian mummy. Legend had it that the mummy would come back alive and turn anyone into stone if removed from the tomb. Shaggy later finds a coin inside his pocket from the exhibit. When the teens return to put it back, they find out that the mummy has come to life and turned the professor into stone and is now after Shaggy's coin.
13	13	"Which Witch Is Which?"	Swamp Witch and Zombie	Zeb Perkins and Zeke	December 6, 1969	45–13
After getting lost in a swamp, Mystery, Inc. comes across a zombie that spooks them. In the nearby town of Swamp's End, they learn that a local witch brought the zombie to life, and they decide to investigate.
14	14	"Go Away Ghost Ship"	Ghosts of Redbeard and his pirate crew	C.L Magnus and his henchmen	December 13, 1969	45–15
A newspaper reporter informs the local shipping company owner Mr. Magnus that his company is going out of business. The reason is that the ghost of Redbeard is haunting the harbor and looting Mr. Magnus' ships. After reading the story and consulting Mr. Magnus, Mystery, Inc. heads out to the harbor to see if they can stop the specters. But soon, they find themselves trapped aboard the eerie ghost ship.
15	15	"Spooky Space Kook"	Space Kook	Henry Bascombe	December 20, 1969	45–14
The Mystery Machine runs out of gas in front of a rural farmhouse. There, the farmer warns them of an abandoned airfield nearby, which is haunted by a flying saucer and its ghostly extra-terrestrial pilot called the Space Kook.
16	16	"A Night of Fright Is No Delight"	Phantom Shadows (Giggling Green Ghosts)	Cosgoode Creeps and Mr. Crawls	January 10, 1970	45–16
Scooby-Doo is named in the will of Colonel Beauregard Sanders, an eccentric millionaire whose life he saved several years before. The only way to claim the inheritance is for Scooby, as well as four other heirs, to spend the night in the Colonel's mansion — which they quickly learn is haunted by two phantom shadows. They are later revealed to be two cackling green ghosts, who chase the gang all around the mansion. Note: In the crossover episode from The CW dark fantasy series Supernatural, Sam & Dean Winchester along with Castiel get transported to this episode by a ghost.
17	17	"That's Snow Ghost"	Snow Ghost	Mr. Greenway	January 17, 1970	45–17
While on a skiing vacation at Wolf's End Lodge, the teens learn about the legend of the Snow Ghost, a ghostly Yeti who is believed to turn anyone he captures into a white ghost. In search of some clues, Mystery, Inc. encounters a Tibetan Buddhist hermit, who they think is responsible for summoning the monster.

=== Season 2 (1970) ===
The theme song is re-recorded with Austin Roberts replacing Larry Marks and featured a new opening and closing sequence. The season also features chase songs also performed by Roberts.

No. overall	No. in season	Title	Villain	Identity	Chase song	Original release date	Prod. code
18	1	"Nowhere to Hyde"	Ghost of Mr. Hyde	Dr. Jekyll	Recipe for My Love	September 12, 1970	45–18
On their way home from the Malt Shop, Mystery, Inc. encounters the ghost of Mr. Hyde in the rear of the Mystery Machine, who races through the marsh and sneaks into a haunted house. This place turns out to be the residence of Dr. Jekyll (the great-grandson of the novel's titular character), who fears he might be transforming into Mr. Hyde. The gang searches the place for some clues, pegging a housekeeper named Helga as the likely suspect. However, they are pursued at every turn by Mr. Hyde.
19	2	"Mystery Mask Mix-Up"	Ghost of Zen Tuo & Scare Pair	Mr. Fong and two henchmen	I Can Make You Happy	September 19, 1970	45–19
After attending a Chinese New Year parade in San Francisco, Daphne buys a golden mask at a local curio shop. Mystery, Inc. then pays a visit to Mr. Fong, who tells them the mask was stolen centuries ago from the crypt of an ancient Chinese warlord named Zen Tuo. When Zen Tuo's two zombie henchmen kidnap Daphne and put the mask on Zen Tuo, the teens set out to the temple to rescue her and solve the mystery.
20	3	"Scooby's Night with a Frozen Fright"	Caveman	Professor Wayne	Seven Days a Week	September 26, 1970	45–21
While out on a fishing expedition, Shaggy and Scooby-Doo hook up a 2-million-year-old caveman that's frozen in a solid block of ice, which Mystery, Inc. learns was lost at sea during a violent storm. They then take the Caveman to the Oceanland aquarium. But when someone resembling the professor melts the ice block, causing the Caveman's relentless rampage, the teens decide to investigate.
21	4	"Jeepers, It's the Creeper"	Creeper	Mr. Carswell	Daydreamin'	October 3, 1970	45–20
While on their way to the high school's barn dance, Mystery, Inc. comes across a knocked-out bank guard and his ransacked armored car. The guard mumbles "the flame will tell, the Creeper" and then he's taken to bank manager Mr. Carswell's house. They discover that the local banks have been robbed by a mysterious zombie-like phantom called the Creeper, who later shows up at the barn dance, cuts the power, and chases the gang all around the farm.
22	5	"Haunted House Hang-Up"	Headless Specter and Phony Phantom	Penrod Stillwall and Asa Shanks	Love the World	October 10, 1970	45–22
The Mystery Machine gets overheated in front of an old spooky mansion. The gang goes to look for help, but a farmer, Asa Shanks, tells them the place is being haunted by the Headless Specter. The mystery gets even stranger when the gang begin to hear some knocking sounds, as well as some clues leading to the hidden treasure. After unmasking the Specter, they find another phantom in the mansion.
23	6	"A Tiki Scare Is No Fair"	Witch Doctor & Mano Tiki Tia	Mr. John Simms and unnamed henchman	N/A	October 17, 1970	45–23
Shaggy and Scooby's vacation in Hawaii is interrupted by a ghostly Witch Doctor, who warns the tourists and natives they are on the sacred grounds of an island god named Mano Tiki Tia. They are also told to stay away from the cursed village. Later, the gang's tour guide Mr. Simms goes missing. So it's up to Mystery, Inc. to search for him in the supposedly cursed village, where they eventually run into a second Witch Doctor and a giant living statue. Note: This is the only Season 2 episode without a musical interlude in its chase scenes.
24	7	"Who's Afraid of the Big Bad Werewolf"	Ghost of Silas Long the Werewolf	Sheep rustler	Tell Me, Tell Me	October 24, 1970	45–24
While relaxing during a camping trip, Mystery, Inc. hears the sound of a wolf howling through the night and finds strange wolf-like tracks on the ground. They follow them throughout the forest to the open, empty grave of a man named Silas Long, who was supposedly a werewolf. They follow his tracks even further to an abandoned sawmill filled with wool, empty barrels, and short tubes sticking out of them, as well as the werewolf's ghost himself.
25	8	"Don't Fool with a Phantom"	Wax Phantom	Roger Stevens	Pretty Mary Sunlight	October 31, 1970	45–25
While participating in the Johnny Sands Dance Game Show at a local television station, Mystery, Inc. encounters a phantom made of wax, who steals a safe filled with money and kidnaps the station manager. They track him down to a nearby wax museum full of famous figures used in motion pictures and television programs, where the phantom relentlessly pursues them. Note: This was the original series finale for Scooby-Doo, Where Are You! until September 9, 1978.

=== Season 3: Scooby's All-Stars (1978) ===
The first eight episodes of the 16-episode third season of Scooby-Doo were broadcast under the Scooby-Doo, Where Are You! name utilizing the original 1969 intro and outro. The revival series was cancelled on October 28, 1978, and the remaining eight episodes that were intended for the revival were instead broadcast during the Scooby's All-Stars block; all 16 were rerun during this block and later syndicated as part of The Scooby-Doo Show. See List of The Scooby-Doo Show episodes for entire season run and The Scooby-Doo Show for proper production credits.

No. overall	No. in season	Title	Written by	Villain(s)	Identity(ies)	Original release date	U.S. households (in millions)
26	1	"Watch Out! The Willawaw!"	Duane Poole	Willawaw and Owl Men	Grey Fox and two henchmen	September 9, 1978	2.68
When Velma's Uncle Dave goes missing, Mystery, Inc. attempts to find him. On their search, they're attacked by the legendary Willawaw, which is said to have captured some people if an owl calls their name.
27	2	"A Creepy Tangle in the Bermuda Triangle"	Haskell Barkin and Tom Dagenais	Skeleton Men	Dr. Grimsley and his henchmen	September 16, 1978	2.76
While on a boat flowing down the Gulf Stream, Mystery, Inc. witnesses a flying saucer hijacking some airplanes. They crash into Diablo Island, where they encounter a creepy sea captain and his trio of one-eyed skeleton henchmen.
28	3	"A Scary Night with a Snow Beast Fright"	N/A	Snow Beast	Dr. Baptiste	September 23, 1978	2.98
After being invited by Professor Krueger at the North Pole, the gang finds out that he has been captured by a terrifying dinosaur-like monster. After they meet an Inuk named Chief Minook, he gets captured as well, and the gang must step in to solve the mystery.
29	4	"To Switch a Witch"	Tony DiMarco	Ghost of Melissa Wilcox	Arlene Wilcox's twin sister	September 30, 1978	2.98
On Halloween night, the New England town of Salem, Massachusetts is being haunted by the ghost of a cackling witch named Melissa Wilcox, who was burned at the stake in 1778. After receiving a distressed call from their friend Arlene Wilcox, a descendant of the accused witch, the gang arrives to help, despite being warned off by the town's paranoid mayor. The gang realizes the witch looks exactly like Arlene.
30	5	"The Tar Monster"	Norman A. Maurer	Tar Monster	Mr. Stoner	October 7, 1978	3.20
The gang heads for Turkey, where the ancient city of Byzantius is being excavated. But the professor informs them that while uncovering the inner sanctum, his workers are frightened away by the city’s ancient guardian, supposedly a monster from the tar pools.
31	6	"A Highland Fling with a Monstrous Thing"	Dick Robbins	Ghost of Finnyan McDuff and Loch Ness Monster	Jamie Cragmoor	October 14, 1978	2.83
The gang heads for Scotland to visit their friend Aggie MacDuff, whose family castle is being plagued by the ghost of her great-grandfather Finian McDuff. It seems the ghost plays his bagpipes to call on the Loch Ness Monster to help him frighten some guests away from the castle.
32	7	"The Creepy Case of Old Iron Face"	Dalton Sandifer	Old Iron Face	Mama Mione	October 21, 1978	2.68
As the gang goes water-skiing, they have a near-fatal encounter with a masked figure and his sharks. While dining at a seaside restaurant, they found out that the figure was none other than Old Iron Face, a convict with an iron mask welded onto his face. The team then ventured out to Skull Island, where the ghost was lurking. And there, they find Captain Morgan, who supposedly disappears while exploring the prison.
33	8	"Jeepers, It's the Jaguaro!"	Larz Bourne	Jaguaro	Barney	October 28, 1978	2.76
After an emergency landing in a jungle somewhere at the Amazon Basin in Brazil, the gang encounters the Jaguaro, a terrifying creature with the head of a black Smilodon and the body of a gorilla, who's hailed as a deity by the natives, haunting the jungle. Note: This is the last episode in season 3 broadcast under the Scooby-Doo, Where Are You! banner, as the revival series was cancelled. The rest of the episodes would be aired as the first part of the Scooby's All–Stars 90-minute block.
34	9	"Make a Beeline Away from that Feline"	Richard S. Conway	Cat Creature	Dr. Bell	November 4, 1978	3.20
While the gang visits New York City to meet Daphne's Aunt Olivia, Shaggy and Scooby witness a cat creature robbing the jewelry store on their way to the apartment. When they arrive, Olivia told them that she received a strangely unexpected package, containing a cat medallion. Shaggy and Scooby traces the return address, but they find out that it's sent from the cemetery.
35	10	"The Creepy Creature of Vulture's Claw"	William Gilbert	Mantis	Professor Greer	November 11, 1978	3.13
While visiting Professor Greer at a botanical garden resort, the gang encounters a seven-foot praying mantis who's trying to scare him off.
36	11	"The Diabolical Disc Demon"	Duane Poole	Phantom (Disc Demon)	Ace Decade	November 18, 1978	3.35
The gang heads for Decade Records recording studio to see a live recording from their friend Jimmy Lewis. However, when songwriter Tony Synes disappears and a ghostly musician begins searching for his latest song, it's up to the gang to solve the mystery.
37	12	"Scooby's Chinese Fortune Kooky Caper"	Haskell Barkin	Moon Monster	Uncle Chin Wong Sing	November 25, 1978	2.24
While stranded at a Chinese palace, the gang stays with Kim, who's about to receive a large inheritance. When the team stops for some rest, they're awakened by the Moon Monster, who wants to steal the family's jewels.
38	13	"A Menace in Venice"	Tom Dagenais	Ghostly Gondolier	Mario	December 2, 1978	2.76
While visiting their friend Antonio in Venice, Italy, the gang encounters a ghostly gondolier, who captures Daphne, as well as Antonio, while trying to find an ancient necklace.
39	14	"Don't Go Near the Fortress of Fear"	Tony DiMarco	Ghost of Juan Carlos	Captain Eddy	December 9, 1978	2.76
The gang arrives at Puerto Rico to visit the ancient fortress El Morro. While there, they encounter a supernatural general who warns them away from his creepy fortress.
40	15	"The Warlock of Wimbledon"	Norman A. Maurer	Anthos the Warlock	Nick Thomas and John the Gatekeeper	December 16, 1978	2.68
In England, the gang meets up with tennis star Jimmy Pelton, who has been cursed by the sinister Warlock Anthos. If he tries to play in Wimbledon, he is doomed.
41	16	"The Beast Is Awake in Bottomless Lake"	Dick Robbins	Beast of Bottomless Lake	Julie	December 23, 1978	2.91
While on a pike-fishing trip in Canada, the gang encounters a lake monster, who scares off the townsfolk from a newly deserted village. When they attempt to go underwater, Shaggy and Scooby are nearly captured by the beast.

== See also ==
- Lost Mysteries
