= The Barefoot Executive =

1971 film by Robert Butler

- Theatrical release poster
- Directed by: Robert Butler
- Screenplay by: Joseph L. McEveety
- Story by: Lila Garrett; Bernie Kahn; Stewart C. Billett
- Produced by: Bill Anderson
- Starring: Kurt Russell; Joe Flynn; Wally Cox; Heather North; John Ritter; Harry Morgan
- Narrated by: Kurt Russell
- Cinematography: Charles F. Wheeler
- Edited by: Robert Stafford
- Music by: Robert F. Brunner; Franklyn Marks; Bruce Belland
- Production company: Walt Disney Productions
- Distributed by: Buena Vista Distribution
- Release date: March 17, 1971
- Running time: 96 minutes
- Country: United States
- Language: English

The Barefoot Executive (also known as The Rating Game) is a 1971 American comedy film starring Kurt Russell, Joe Flynn, Wally Cox, Heather North, Harry Morgan and John Ritter (in his film debut). The plot concerns a pet chimpanzee named Raffles who can predict the popularity of television programs. The film was produced by Walt Disney Productions and directed by Robert Butler. It was frequently aired during The Wonderful World of Disney from the late 1970s through the 1980s.

== Plot ==
Steven Post is a mail clerk at the struggling UBC (United Broadcasting Corporation) Network. Post discovers that a chimpanzee named Raffles, left in the care of his girlfriend Jennifer Scott, has the uncanny ability to choose which television programs will succeed or fail with audiences. Post smuggles Raffles into the UBC building when programs are being previewed for executives and watches as the chimpanzee gives his vote for the film Devil Dan. Post tells the programming executives that Devil Dan will draw large audiences. The executives ignore his advice. To prove he is right, Post sneaks into UBC's broadcast center and switches the reels. Executives are outraged, but Post is proved right. The film propels UBC to first place in the ratings war. Post claims the chimpanzee's abilities as his own and rises to vice president of UBC.

Fearing Post's abilities will make their jobs unnecessary, network president E. J. Crampton, former vice-president Francis X. Wilbanks, and their obsequious assistant attempt to uncover the secret. Putting Post's apartment under surveillance, they discover the chimpanzee watching television with Post. Crampton and Wilbanks decide to steal the chimpanzee and return it to the jungle.

After Wilbanks and his chauffeur Mertons's attempt to kidnap the chimpanzee fails, the network offers Post $1,000,000 in exchange for the chimpanzee, which he accepts. Jennifer becomes disenchanted with him when she finds out he sold her pet without her consent and breaks off their relationship. She also does not believe her chimpanzee should be released into the wild.

Raffles, accompanied by the studio executives, is flown to Brazil in a plane that will parachute him into the Amazon. Before reaching the drop point, Raffles pulls the emergency hatch lever which sucks the executives out of the plane, causing them to parachute into the jungle instead. The plane returns with Raffles, and Mertons, who is sympathetic to Jennifer's feelings, notifies Post that the chimpanzee is now en route back to him. Post uses this opportunity to refund the $1,000,000 for the chimpanzee. Jennifer and Post rekindle their relationship, and eventually marry. The final scene shows them flying off on their honeymoon (with Raffles), while a radio announcement says that Post has resigned his vice presidency of UBC, but many people are wishing him well in his future endeavors.

== Cast ==
- Kurt Russell - Steven Post, narrator
- Joe Flynn - Francis X. Wilbanks
- Harry Morgan - E.J. Crampton
- Wally Cox (in his final Disney role before his death in 1973) - Mertons
- Heather North - Jennifer Scott
- Alan Hewitt - Farnsworth
- Hayden Rorke - Clifford
- John Ritter - Roger
- Jack Bender - Tom
- Tom Anfinsen - Dr. Schmidt
- George N. Neise - Network Executive
- Ed Reimers - Announcer
- Morgan Farley - Advertising Executive
- Glenn Dixon - Sponsor
- Robert Shayne - Sponsor
- Tris Coffin - Sponsor
- James B. Douglas - Network Executive
- Ed Prentiss - Harry
- Fabian Dean - Jackhammer Man
- Iris Adrian - Woman Shopper
- Smilin' Jack Smith - Clathworthy
- Eve Brent - Mrs. Crampton
- Sandra Gould - Mrs. Wilbanks
- James Flavin - Father O'Leary (final role)
- Peter Renaday - Policeman
- Judson Pratt - Policeman
- Vince Howard - Policeman
- Hal Baylor - Policeman
- Bill Daily - Navigator
- Dave Willock - Doorman
- Anthony Teague - TV Salesman
- Edward Faulkner - Reporter

== Music ==
The Barefoot Executive's score was written by Robert F. Brunner. The film's theme song, "He's Gonna Make It," was written by Bruce Belland and Robert F. Brunner. The song is played over the film's opening credits.

== Reception ==
At the review-aggregation site Rotten Tomatoes, the film has an approval rating of 83% based on six reviews. On Metacritic, the film has a weighted average score of 55 out to 100, based on four critics, indicating "mixed or average reviews".

Howard Thompson of The New York Times described the film as a "genial but strained and arch frolic" with "one real joke" that "wears thin and frantic". Variety wrote that Walt Disney Productions had "one of the funniest comedies of the season". Gene Siskel of the Chicago Tribune gave the film three stars out of four. Charles Champlin of the Los Angeles Times called it "a light, slight, well-made, well-acted, pleasantly diverting Disney comedy which falls somewhere just north of The Gnome-Mobile and well south of The Love Bug on the Disney scale". David McGillivray of The Monthly Film Bulletin wrote: "Although at first glance no more than a hastily expanded idea and a chance to reunite the team that made The Computer Wore Tennis Shoes, this new Disney comedy develops into an extremely beguiling satire on the audience ratings game, while retaining enough slapstick to keep children of all audiences thoroughly entertained."

== Home media ==
The Barefoot Executive was first released on VHS in October 1985 and then on February 3, 1998 by Walt Disney Home Video. Disney released the film on DVD on April 12, 2004.

== Remake ==
The film was remade for the Disney Channel in 1995 starring Jason London, Eddie Albert, Michael Marich, Jay Mohr, Yvonne De Carlo, Ann Magnuson, Nathan Anderson, Terri Ivens and Chris Elliott. The remake was directed by Susan Seidelman.

== See also ==
- List of American films of 1971
