= Into the Homeland =

- Genre: Crime drama
- Written by: Anna Hamilton Phelan
- Directed by: Lesli Linka Glatter
- Starring: Powers Boothe; C. Thomas Howell; Cindy Pickett; Paul LeMat; Emily Longstreth
- Music by: David Mansfield
- Country of origin: United States
- Original language: English

Production
- Producer: Kevin McCormick
- Production locations: Buffalo, Wyoming; Sheridan, Wyoming; Los Angeles, California; San Juan Capistrano, California
- Cinematography: Robert Elswit
- Editor: Eve Newman
- Running time: 110 minutes
- Production company: HBO Pictures

Original release
- Network: HBO
- Release: December 26, 1987

Into the Homeland is a 1987 television crime drama that aired on HBO on December 26, 1987, directed by Lesli Linka Glatter and starring Powers Boothe, C. Thomas Howell, Paul LeMat, Emily Longstreth and Cindy Pickett. The teleplay was written by Anna Hamilton Phelan.

In 1984, Jack Swallow (Boothe) is a Los Angeles Police Department detective who was unable to prevent a child's death during a drug raid. He leaves both the police force and his family to become a beach bum and surf shop owner of sorts in San Juan Capistrano, California. Three years later, his daughter turns up missing. He tracks her to her boyfriend (Howell) in rural Wyoming, whose father turns out to be the leader of a violent white power organization that kidnapped his daughter.

== Cast ==
- Powers Boothe as Jackson Swallow
- C. Thomas Howell as Tripp Winston
- Cindy Pickett as Rye Swallow
- Paul Le Mat as Derrick Winston
- David Caruso as Ryder
- Emily Longstreth as Ember Swallow
  - Ariana Richards as Ember Swallow (Ages 5 & 7)
- Arye Gross as Joel Bessman
- Shelby Leverington as Rebecca Winston
- Becky Barnes as Liberty Winston
- Kimberlee Bonnet as Glory Winston
- Lisa Cloud as Mae Castle
- Gwen Covington as Janet
- Ian Foxx as Ricardo
- Gary Hershberger as "Whitey"
- Dawn Holder as Justine Winston
- Agapito Leal as Godparent
- Paul Linke as "Red" Hughes
- Ernie Lively as Tom Burnside
- James Marshall as Skateboard Kid (credited as James Greenblatt)
- Wade Mayer as Walt
- Eunice McEwan as Clara Jolly
- Duncan McLeod as Reverend Smedley
- Jon Renfield as Daryl Jolly
- Lela Rochon as Exquisite Woman
- Andrew Ross as Duane Jolly
- Terrance Sweeney as Father O'Neill (credited as Father Terrance Sweeney)
- Summer Thomas as Angel
- Manu Tupou as Mafoa
- Chris Ufland as Joshua Winston
- Bruce Wright as Rick
- Randy Ziegler as Freedom Winston
