= Tony Azito =

American actor and dancer (1948–1995)

Tony Azito (born Antonio Zito; July 18, 1948 – May 26, 1995) was an American eccentric dancer and character actor from Manhattan. He was best known for comedic and grotesque parts, which were accentuated by his hyperextended body.

== Education ==
Azito was part of the Juilliard School's Group I, the first students admitted to the drama division directed by John Houseman in 1968. His classmates included Patti LuPone and Kevin Kline. Soon after arriving at Juilliard, Azito became influenced by choreographer Anna Sokolow and began studying modern dance. At 6 ft 3 in (191 cm), he was an unusual candidate for dance training. Azito's younger brother, Arturo Azito, was a dancer and performed with Eliot Feld and the Boston Ballet.

His interest in dance aggravated Houseman, who was anxious about the number of gay men in Group I and had already clashed with Azito over a cross-dressing incident. Partially as a result of this conflict with Houseman, Azito left Juilliard without finishing a degree and spent two years performing in Sokolow's company as Antonio Azito.

== Theatrical career ==
Returning to drama in the mid-1970s, Azito began working in off-Broadway and off-off-Broadway theater. He quickly began working with the director Wilford Leach, who would be one of Azito's most frequent employers until Leach's death in 1988. He performed in a number of productions at La MaMa Experimental Theatre Club, where Leach was artistic director.

In 1971, he performed in The Red, White, and Black at La MaMa, directed by John Dillon and written by Eric Bentley with music by Brad Burg. The show was co-produced by La MaMa and the Columbia University School of the Arts Theatre Division. He then appeared in Leach and John Braswell's 1973 production of Carmilla with the E.T.C. Company of La MaMa. Carmilla featured music by Ben Johnston and was part of the company's repertoire throughout the early 1970s. He also did tech for Jeffrey Weiss' Pushover at La MaMa and appeared in La MaMa's "Christmas fete for children of all ages", ...And All the Trimmings, written by Bernard Roth and directed by William Duffy in 1973.

In 1974, he appeared in Nancy Fales' Ark, with music by Sonelius Smith and directed by Ralph Lee at La MaMa. He also appeared in Nancy Heikin's Frame, which was produced by La MaMa at the Washington Square Church (135 W. 4th St.) in 1974. He appeared with the E.T.C. Company of La MaMa in Wilford Leach's C.O.R.F.A.X. (Don't Ask) at La MaMa in early 1974, then toured the show in Europe with the company later that same year. In 1975, Azito was featured in the Cotton Club Gala, with music by Aaron Bell. He reprised his role in Carmilla at La MaMa in 1976.

Azito made his Broadway debut in Richard Foreman's 1976 revival of The Threepenny Opera for the New York Shakespeare Festival, in a dancing role ("Samuel") created especially for him. Critics were intrigued by what soon became Azito's style of dance, which made him look like a somewhat off-kilter marionette and was accompanied by stylized facial expressions. An interviewer once described Azito as "a bit like Buster Keaton injected with Silly Putty." This production also began Azito's association with Joseph Papp's New York Shakespeare Festival, which continued with another Brecht-Weill musical, Happy End (1977).

Azito's best-known stage role was in a third production for the New York Shakespeare Festival, as the Sergeant of Police in the 1980 Broadway revival of The Pirates of Penzance, starring Linda Ronstadt and Kevin Kline. His performance earned him a Tony Award nomination and a Drama Desk Award, and he reprised the role in the 1983 film adaptation directed by Leach.

He then played Feste in the New York Shakespeare Festival production of Twelfth Night directed by Leach in 1986. He went on to perform at Radio City Music Hall, the Mark Taper Forum, and in the American National Theater company at the Kennedy Center. Azito's final Broadway role was in The Mystery of Edwin Drood, also directed by Leach. While in the touring company for The Mystery of Edwin Drood, both of Azito's legs were badly broken when he was hit by a cab. It took a few years for Azito to get back on his feet. He went on to perform in a summer stock revival of She Loves Me in Stockbridge, Massachusetts and in productions of Tom Stoppard's Travesties and the musical Amphigorey.

== Film and television career ==
Azito's most memorable film role was the Police Sergeant in The Pirates of Penzance.

He also appeared in Union City (1980) with Debbie Harry, Woody Allen's Stardust Memories (1980), Chattanooga Choo Choo (1984), Private Resort (1985) with Rob Morrow and Johnny Depp, Moonstruck (1987) with Cher, Bloodhounds of Broadway (1989) with Madonna, and played the lead in the 1976 cult film Apple Pie.

Azito's final film role was the Librarian in H.P. Lovecraft's: Necronomicon (1993). He also had a cameo as one of the party dancers in The Addams Family (1991).

On television, he appeared on episodes of Miami Vice, The Equalizer, and Beacon Hill.

== Death ==
Azito continued performing in regional theater and the occasional film until 1994. He died of HIV/AIDS on May 27, 1995, at Saint Vincent's Catholic Medical Center in Manhattan, New York City, at age 46.

== Filmography ==
Tony Azito film and television credits
Year	Title	Role	Notes
1976	Apple Pie	Jacques (the Ace) Blinbaum	Film
1980	Night of the Juggler	Peep Show Cashier	Film
1980	Union City	Alphonse Florescu	Film
1980	Stardust Memories	Fan in Lobby	Film
1983	The Pirates of Penzance	Sergeant	Film
1984	Chattanooga Choo Choo	Lucky Pierre	Film
1985	Private Resort	Reeves	Film
1987	Moonstruck	Conti	Film
1988	The Equalizer	Jameson	Episode: "Last Call"
1988	Miami Vice	Miguel Manolo	1 episode
1989	Bloodhounds of Broadway	Waiter	Film
1991	The Addams Family	Digit Addams	Film
1993	H.P. Lovecraft's: Necronomicon	Librarian (wraparound)	Film (final role)
