= Git! =

1965 film

- Theatrical release poster
- Directed by: Ellis Kadison
- Screenplay by: Homer McCoy
- Story by: Ellis Kadison; Homer McCoy
- Produced by: Ellis Kadison
- Starring: Jack Chaplain; Heather North; Leslie Bradley; Richard Webb; Hanna Landy; Emory Parnell
- Cinematography: Gordon Avil
- Edited by: Donald Tait
- Music by: Phillip Lambro
- Production company: World-Cine Associates Production
- Distributed by: Embassy Pictures
- Release date: October 1965
- Running time: 92 minutes
- Country: United States
- Language: English

Git! is a 1965 American drama film directed by Ellis Kadison and written by Homer McCoy. The film stars Jack Chaplain, Heather North, Leslie Bradley, Richard Webb, Hanna Landy and Emory Parnell. The film was released in October 1965, by Embassy Pictures.

== Plot ==
Deke, a 17-year-old itinerant orphan from a boy's home, is arrested by the authorities after he stops Art Finney, a trainer for a wealthy California dog breeder, Andrew Garrett, from shooting "Rock", a renegade English setter and alleged animal killer. Garrett has Deke remanded to his custody and gives him a job assisting an uncooperative Finney and also working with Rock, whom Deke asserts can become a fine hunting dog. Finney and Garrett don't agree, but gradually come round to accept his belief in Rock.

== Cast ==
- Jack Chaplain as Deke
- Heather North as Elaine
- Leslie Bradley as Finney
- Richard Webb as Andrew Garrett
- Hanna Landy as Mrs. Finney
- Emory Parnell as T.C. Knox
- Joseph Hamilton as Jed
- Richard Valentine as District Attorney
- Jeff Burton as Police Sergeant
- Sherry Moreland as Dr. Allan
- Shug Fisher as Sam Lewis
