= Velma Dinkley =

Fictional character from Scooby-Doo

- Scooby-Doo character
- First appearance: "What a Night for a Knight"; Scooby-Doo, Where Are You!; September 13, 1969
- Created by: Joe Ruby; Ken Spears
- Designed by: Iwao Takamoto
- Voiced by: Nicole Jaffe (1969–1973, 2003); Pat Stevens (1976–1979); Marla Frumkin (1979–1984); Christina Lange (young; 1988–1991); B. J. Ward (1997–2002); Mindy Cohn (2002–2015, 2017); Krystal Harris (2003; singing); Linda Cardellini (2004); Bets Malone (2012; singing); Stephanie D'Abruzzo (2013); Kate Micucci (2015–present); Gina Rodriguez (2020); Ariana Greenblatt (young; 2020–2022); Mindy Kaling (Velma; 2023–2024); (see below)
- Portrayed by: Linda Cardellini (2002–2004); Lauren Kennedy (young; 2004); Hayley Kiyoko (2009–2010); Sarah Gilman (2018); (see below)

In-universe information
- Gender: Female
- Occupation: Private investigator
- Significant others: Patrick Wisely (Scooby-Doo 2: Monsters Unleashed); Norville "Shaggy" Rogers (Shaggy & Scooby-Doo Get a Clue!, Scooby-Doo! Mystery Incorporated, Scooby-Doo! Curse of the Lake Monster, Scooby Apocalypse); Hot Dog Water (Marcie Fleach) (Scooby-Doo! Mystery Incorporated)
- Children: Frederick Rufus Rogers-Dinkley (Scooby Apocalypse)
- Relatives: see below

Velma Dinkley is a fictional cartoon character in the Scooby-Doo franchise. She is usually seen wearing a baggy orange turtleneck sweater, a short red pleated skirt, knee high socks, Mary Jane shoes, and a pair of black square glasses, which she frequently loses and is unable to see without. She is seen as the "brains" of the group.

== Character description ==
Throughout her various incarnations, Velma is usually portrayed as a highly intelligent young woman with an interest in the sciences. She is also often portrayed as being very well-read on obscure fields such as Norse writing (as in the third Scooby-Doo series, The Scooby-Doo Show). Due to her intelligence and problem-solving abilities, Velma is typically the first one to solve the mystery and, like Sherlock Holmes and many other fictional detectives, often keeps her conclusions secret till the end of the story. Velma Dinkley was inspired by the brainy sweater girl Zelda Gilroy, as played by Sheila Kuehl, from the late 1950s/early 1960s American sitcom The Many Loves of Dobie Gillis.

A running gag in Scooby-Doo, Where Are You! and The New Scooby-Doo Movies is Velma's severe myopia and her ability to repeatedly lose her glasses (often the result of them falling off her face while she is being chased by a villain), saying "My glasses! I can't see without my glasses!" whenever she accidentally misplaces them. Another running gag occurs when other frightened characters leap into her arms.

Velma is characterized as the most skeptical of the gang and is most likely to discount any paranormal explanations to their mysteries. This is particularly evident in the films Scooby-Doo! and the Curse of the 13th Ghost and Scooby-Doo! Return to Zombie Island, in which she discounts ghosts and zombies (which are real within the context of the franchise) that could not be unmasked by claiming they are hallucinations.

In some early Scooby-Doo episodes, she also demonstrates a preference for going barefoot, such as in Scooby-Doo, Where Are You! episode "A Tiki Scare Is No Fair" and The Scooby-Doo Show episode "Jeepers, It's the Jaguaro!".

=== Character background ===
Like all of the Scooby-Doo kids, later ret-conned as Mystery Incorporated members, Velma has a differing personal backstory and origin in different series.

In the original series Scooby-Doo, Where Are You!, Velma is shown to attend the same high school as the rest of the gang (as stated in the inaugural episode "What a Night for a Knight"). However, by The New Scooby-Doo Movies, Velma is said to have graduated from a different high school (as stated in the episode "Spirited Spooked Sports Show"). In the film Scooby-Doo! Curse of the Lake Monster, it is revealed that her middle name is Daisy.

According to Scooby-Doo: Behind the Scenes, before she said "Jinkies!" she used to say "Oh, my!" but it wasn't as catchy. Her parents are depicted to have pushed her from an early age to excel in her studies, resulting in hundreds of awards for outstanding achievement. Because of this, she is more vocal than her comrades would like. Of course, she also does her share of sweet-talking too.

During the first season of the 2010–2013 series Scooby-Doo! Mystery Incorporated, Velma is in a romantic relationship with Shaggy, much to the distaste of Scooby-Doo. Their relationship ends in "Howl of the Fright Hound" (season 1, episode 10). This series' incarnation of Velma is shown to be secretive and controlling. In the second season of Mystery Incorporated, Velma is shown secretly working for the series' overarching villain, Mr. E, alongside Marcie "Hot Dog Water" Fleach who is Velma's former rival in science fairs. The two become friends after Velma returns to the gang and by the time of the series finale, Velma and Marcie are teammates at the Tri-state Olympiad of Science. This version of Velma frequently uses the expressions "Oy" and "Oy gevalt", and is also shown listening to Klezmer music, hinting at a Jewish identity.

=== Love interests ===
Daphne Blake: You're pregnant?!
Velma Dinkley: You sound horrified.
Daphne Blake: Not horrified... Just surprised. I never thought you were interested in men.
Velma Dinkley: But Shaggy and I have been together for months!
Daphne Blake: Proving my point.
Shaggy Rogers: Hey!

— Daphne Blake discussing Velma's sexuality in relation to her relationship and pregnancy with Shaggy Rogers – Scooby Apocalypse #36 "The Brothers Dinkley!" (November 2018).

Velma Dinkley is usually shown in relationships with men such as Shaggy Rogers (with whom she has a son in Scooby Apocalypse), Johnny Bravo, Patrick Wisely, Sam Winchester, Ben Ravencroft, and many other male characters, although since the 2010s, she has been depicted as also being romantically interested in other women, such as Coco Diablo.

In 2020, James Gunn, the screenwriter of the 2002 Scooby-Doo film, stated that Velma was written "eyeballing Daphne" in early drafts of the script in accordance with the film's original intent as an R-rated deconstruction of the Scooby-Doo canon (with Shaggy meant to be depicted as a stoner, and Fred a gangster, the latter also ambiguously portrayed in the final film by Freddie Prinze Jr. as "[closeted] gay or bisexual because of the ascot"), although the final film would see Velma have a romance with a male waiter, with the film's 2004 sequel Scooby-Doo 2: Monsters Unleashed further depicting Velma in a full romantic relationship with Seth Green's character, Patrick Wisely.

While addressing comments on his Instagram page in 2020 about Mystery Incorporated's episode director labelling its version of Velma as being bisexual, producer Tony Cervone confirmed in response that his intention was for this iteration of Velma's relationship with Marcie "Hot Dog Water" Fleach to be depicted—as clearly as would be permitted at the time—as a romantic one, following her previous failed relationship with Shaggy, with the characters subtly implied to be in a relationship in the series finale, with Marcie referring to Velma as "my girl". In the 2022 animated film Trick or Treat Scooby-Doo!, Velma is depicted as "crushing big time" on female supporting antagonist Coco Diablo, which was widely reported by online news media as confirmation of the character's lesbianism. However, right after the release of Trick or Treat, it was revealed that Velma would have a "secret crush" on Fred in the HBO Max adult-oriented and metafictional streaming television series Velma, pitched as a "love quadrangle", in which both Shaggy and Daphne would be depicted as having crushes on a South Asian version of Velma. The show received overwhelmingly negative reception. It gathered criticism for its characterization and departures from Scooby-Doo such as removal of Scooby-Doo. On October 8, 2024, the show was cancelled.

== Portrayals ==
=== Voice actors ===
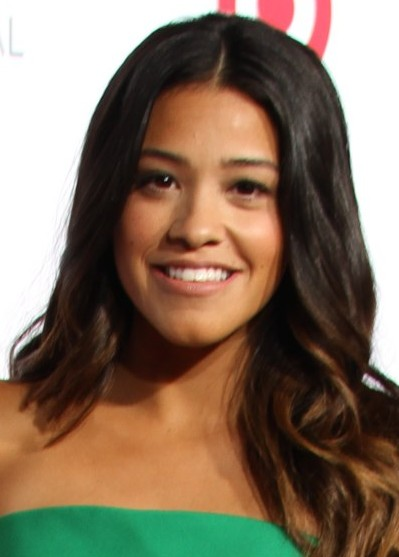
Gina Rodriguez voices Velma Dinkley in Scoob!.

From 1969 to 1973, Nicole Jaffe voiced Velma. From 1976 to 1979, Pat Stevens voiced the character. From 1979 to 1980, Marla Frumkin provided her voice. After the character's absence from the 1980 to 1983 series, Frumkin reprised the role of Velma as a guest star in The New Scooby-Doo Mysteries. Velma was absent again until A Pup Named Scooby-Doo, when Christina Lange voiced the role. B.J. Ward voiced Velma in a Johnny Bravo crossover episode, then reprised her role in all films from Scooby-Doo on Zombie Island on through Scooby-Doo and the Cyber Chase as well as an episode of the Adult Swim animated series, Harvey Birdman, Attorney at Law. Nicole Jaffe returned temporarily to voice Velma in the direct-to-video films Scooby-Doo! and the Legend of the Vampire and Scooby-Doo! and the Monster of Mexico.

From 2002 until 2015, Velma was voiced by Mindy Cohn of The Facts of Life fame. In Scooby-Doo! Adventures: The Mystery Map, Velma is voiced by Stephanie D'Abruzzo. On July 8, 2015, it was announced that Kate Micucci would take over the role of Velma in the then-upcoming series Be Cool, Scooby-Doo!. Trisha Gum voiced Velma in The Lego Movie 2: The Second Part. Velma was voiced by Ariana Greenblatt as a child and Gina Rodriguez as a teenager in the animated film Scoob!, with Greenblatt being set to reprise the role of her younger self in Scoob! Holiday Haunt before the film was canceled in August 2022. She makes a silent cameo in her aforementioned form (like the rest of the gang) as a spectator in Space Jam: A New Legacy.

On February 10, 2021, it was announced that Velma will have her own streaming television series on HBO Max in January 2023 with Mindy Kaling voicing her while executing producing with Charlie Grandy, Howard Klein and Sam Register. Titled Velma, the series follows an adult-oriented and metafictional "love quadrangle" Mystery Inc. with Velma portrayed as being of Indian descent. On July 11, 2022, the trademark for the series was listed as abandoned, only for HBO Chief Content Officer Casey Bloys to confirm the series to still be in production in August, with it previewing at New York Comic Con on October 6, 2022. The first two episodes of the series debuted on HBO Max on January 12, 2023; the other eight were released within the following months. Velma was cancelled after two seasons and a special as a result of negative reviews.

==== Additional voice actors ====
- Patricia Parris (Hanna-Barbera Educational Filmstrips)
- Robyn Moore (Pauls commercial)
- Grey DeLisle (one line in Scooby-Doo and the Cyber Chase, Mad)
- Krystal Harris (2003; singing voice in Scooby-Doo! and the Legend of the Vampire)
- Linda Cardellini (Scooby-Doo 2: Monsters Unleashed: The Video Game, Robot Chicken)
- Bets Malone (2012; singing voice in Scooby-Doo! Music of the Vampire)
- Mindy Kaling (Velma)

==== Parodies ====
- Lori Alan (Family Guy)
- Meredith Salenger (Mad)
- Julie Nathanson (Mad)
- Kathryn Griffiths (The Demon Road Trilogy, as Linda)
- Joanna Adler (The Venture Bros, as Val)
- Clare Grant (Robot Chicken)

=== Live-action portrayals ===
Velma Dinkley portrayals

Velma as portrayed by Linda Cardellini in Scooby-Doo (2002) and Scooby-Doo 2: Monsters Unleashed (2004)

Velma as portrayed by Hayley Kiyoko in Scooby-Doo! The Mystery Begins (2009) and Curse of the Lake Monster (2010)

In the 2002 and 2004 live-action films, Velma is played by Linda Cardellini, who then voiced her for the Scooby-Doo 2: Monsters Unleashed video game and Robot Chicken. Lauren Kennedy portrayed young Velma in a flashback sequence in Scooby-Doo 2: Monsters Unleashed. Velma is portrayed by Hayley Kiyoko in the 2009 live-action film Scooby-Doo! The Mystery Begins and its 2010 sequel Scooby-Doo! Curse of the Lake Monster. Sarah Gilman portrayed the young Velma in the 2018 direct-to-video film Daphne & Velma.

==== Additional live-action actors ====
- Randi Rosenholtz (2001; Scooby-Doo! in Stagefright – Live on Stage)
- Laura Sicurello (2009; Scooby-Doo! and the Pirate Ghost – Live on Stage)
- Michele Dumoulin (2013; Scooby-Doo Live! Musical Mysteries)
- Louise Wright (2014; Scooby-Doo Live! The Mystery Of The Pyramid)
- Rebecca Withers (2016; Scooby-Doo Live! Musical Mysteries)
- Alicia D'Ariano (2020; Scooby-Doo! and the Lost City of Gold)

==== Parodies ====
- Rhona Cameron (1994; lookalike in Funny Man)
- Jane Silvia (2001; lookalike in Jay and Silent Bob Strike Back)
- Ashley Rae Spillers (2012; lookalike in Saturday Morning Mystery)
- Sarah Sherman (2024; Saturday Night Live)

== Relatives ==
Relatives of Velma's shown or mentioned during the series include:

- Angie and Dale Dinkley: Velma's parents in Scooby-Doo: Mystery Incorporated and Scooby Apocalypse. They run the Crystal Cove Spook Museum
- Mr and Mrs Dinkley: Velma's parents in A Pup Named Scooby-Doo
- Madelyn Dinkley: Velma's younger sister that attends a magic school in Scooby-Doo! Abracadabra-Doo
- Otto Dinkely (né Von Dinkelstein) and his wife: Velma's German immigrant great grandparents in Scooby-Doo! Frankencreepy
- Basil Von Dinkelstein: Velma's scientist great uncle in Scooby-Doo! Frankencreepy
- Uncle John: Velma's archaeologist uncle in The Scooby-Doo Show
- Dave Walton: Velma's US-Canadian border patrol officer uncle in The Scooby-Doo Show
- Cosmo Dinkley: Velma's archaeologist paternal uncle in The New Scooby-Doo Mysteries
- Uncle Elmo: Velma's doctor uncle in A Pup Named Scooby-Doo
- Aunt Thelma: Velma's marine biologist aunt in A Pup Named Scooby-Doo
- Evan, Meg, and Darcy: Velma's farmer uncle, aunt, and cousin in What's New, Scooby-Doo?
- Thelma Dinkley: Velma's Egyptologist cousin in Scooby-Doo! Mystery Adventures
- Various relatives in books and comics including uncles Albert, Brad and Robert, aunts Selma and Gretchen, cousins Tavish MacDougal, Lilia and Sarah, and an unnamed grandfather.

== In other media ==
Velma appears in the Teen Titans Go! episode "Cartoon Feud", the Jellystone! episode "Frankenhooky", and Supernatural episode "Scoobynatural". Velma also appears in the 2021 film Space Jam: A New Legacy, with her SCOOB design. She appears as an NPC in Lego Dimensions, a playable character in Multiversus, and appears as a skin in Fortnite.

Velma appears in many other Scooby-Doo videogames, books, comics, and other merchandise.
