= The New Scooby-Doo Movies =

American animated television series

- Title card
- Genre: Comedy; Mystery; Adventure
- Created by: Joe Ruby; Ken Spears
- Directed by: William Hanna; Joseph Barbera
- Voices of: Don Messick; Casey Kasem; Frank Welker; Nicole Jaffe; Heather North
- Composer: Hoyt Curtin
- Country of origin: United States
- Original language: English
- No. of seasons: 2
- No. of episodes: 24

Production
- Producers: William Hanna; Joseph Barbera
- Running time: 42–43 minutes
- Production company: Hanna-Barbera Productions

Original release
- Network: CBS
- Release: September 9, 1972 – October 27, 1973

Related
- Scooby-Doo, Where Are You! (1969–70, 1978); The Scooby-Doo Show (1976–78)

The New Scooby-Doo Movies is an American animated mystery comedy television series produced by Hanna-Barbera for CBS. It is the second television series in the Scooby-Doo franchise, and follows the first incarnation, Scooby-Doo, Where Are You! It premiered on September 9, 1972, and ended on October 27, 1973, running for two seasons on CBS as the only hour-long Scooby-Doo series. Twenty-four episodes were produced, sixteen for the 1972–73 season and eight more for the 1973–74 season.

Aside from doubling the length of each episode, The New Scooby-Doo Movies differed from its predecessor in the addition of a rotating special guest star slot; each episode featured real world celebrities or well-known animated characters joining the Mystery, Inc. gang in solving mysteries. This concept was later revisited with a similar animated series titled Scooby-Doo and Guess Who?, which premiered in 2019.

The New Scooby-Doo Movies was the last incarnation of Scooby-Doo airing on CBS, and also the franchise's final time to feature Nicole Jaffe as the regular voice of Velma Dinkley, due to her marriage and retirement from acting.

== Overview ==
Many of the guest stars who appeared in The New Scooby-Doo Movies were living celebrities who provided their own voices (including but not limited to Don Knotts, Jerry Reed, Cass Elliot, Jonathan Winters, Sandy Duncan, Tim Conway, Dick Van Dyke, Don Adams, Davy Jones and Sonny & Cher); some episodes featured celebrities who were retired or deceased, whose voicing was done by imitators (The Three Stooges and Laurel and Hardy), and the rest were crossovers with present or future Hanna-Barbera characters.

The characters from other Hanna-Barbera shows Harlem Globetrotters, Josie and the Pussycats, Jeannie, and Speed Buggy all appeared on the show during or after their own shows' original runs; The Addams Family and Batman and Robin (the first time the latter duo appeared in a Hanna-Barbera cartoon) both appeared on the show a year before they were incorporated into Hanna-Barbera shows of their own, The Addams Family and Super Friends, respectively.

After The New Scooby-Doo Movies ended its original network run in August 1974, repeats of Scooby-Doo, Where Are You! aired on CBS for the next two years. No new Scooby-Doo cartoons would be produced until the show moved to ABC in September 1976 on the highly publicized The Scooby-Doo/Dynomutt Hour. When the various Scooby-Doo series entered syndication in 1980, each New Movies episode was halved and run as two half-hour parts. The USA Network Cartoon Express began running the New Movies in their original format beginning in September 1990; they were rerun on Sunday mornings until August 1992.

In 1994, The New Scooby-Doo Movies began appearing on three Turner Broadcasting networks: TNT, Cartoon Network and Boomerang. Like many animated series created by Hanna-Barbera in the 1970s, the show contained a laugh track created by the studio. The first season of the series was animated at Hanna-Barbera's main studio in Los Angeles, while the second season was animated at their newly formed studio, Hanna-Barbera Pty, Ltd. in Australia.

== Episodes ==
=== Series overview ===
Season	Episodes	Originally released	
Season	Episodes	First released	Last released
1	16	September 9, 1972	December 23, 1972
2	8	September 8, 1973	October 27, 1973

=== Season 1 (1972) ===
No. overall	No. in season	Title	Guest star(s)	Original release date
1	1	"Ghastly Ghost Town"	The Three Stooges	September 9, 1972
Side-tracked by a giant bat, the gang helps the Three Stooges (Moe, Larry, and Curly Joe) with their theme park: a real-life ghost town with real-life ghostly villains. Villains: Gunslinger Ghost/Amos Crunch, Ghost of Geronimo/Rhino
2	2	"The Dynamic Scooby-Doo Affair"	Batman and Robin	September 16, 1972
Mystery Inc. teams up with Batman and Robin to uncover a counterfeiting ring run by a strange hooded figure who has been sending counterfeit money to the Joker and the Penguin. Villains: The Hooded Man/Mrs. Baker, Joker and Penguin (later dressed as skeletons)
3	3	"Scooby-Doo Meets the Addams Family"	The Addams Family	September 23, 1972
With the Mystery Machine stuck in mud, Mystery Inc. ends up becoming housekeepers for the Addams Family while Gomez and Morticia go on vacation to the Okefenokee Swamp. A giant vulture threatens the Addams house by demanding that their family leaves the property and Wednesday goes missing, so Scooby and the gang go to find her and stop the Vulture. Alternate Episode Title: "Wednesday is Missing" Villains: The Vulture/A disguised helicopter (piloted by the former Housekeepers) Note: Due to rights disputes with the estate of Charles Addams, this episode remains unavailable on home video in the United States.
4	4	"The Frickert Fracas"	Jonathan Winters	September 30, 1972
Jonathan Winters invites the gang to visit a farm, where Maude Frickert needs help finding a secret formula—unless a living scarecrow gets to it first. Villain: Scarecrow/Simon Shakey
5	5	"Guess Who's Knott Coming to Dinner?"	Don Knotts	October 7, 1972
Stuck in a storm, the kids take shelter in a nearby mansion where a hooded ghost of Captain Moody seems to think the kids are someone else and Don Knotts takes on different identities. They finally find the real Captain Moody and work to unmask the fake Captain Moody. Villains: The Ghosts of Captain Moody/Captain Moody's nephews
6	6	"A Good Medium Is Rare"	Phyllis Diller	October 14, 1972
After returning the dog of Phyllis Diller, Mystery, Inc. joins her to a seance at the mysterious Magic Mansion, where they find out a gargoyle and two phantoms are after her hidden treasure. Villains: The Gargoyle and the Phantoms/Alberto the receptionist and the security guard
7	7	"Sandy Duncan's Jekyll and Hyde"	Sandy Duncan	October 21, 1972
Mystery, Inc. comes to the aid of Sandy Duncan at Mammoth Studios when various monster attacks disrupt the production of her latest movie which is a remake of Strange Case of Dr. Jekyll and Mr. Hyde. Villain: Mr. Hyde, The Phantom, The Pirate, The Freaky Sheik, The Dragon, King Kong, The Grizzly Bear, The Lion, The Mummy, Chief Blood-in-the-Eye, and The Wolfman/Zalia Z. Fairchild
8	8	"The Secret of Shark Island"	Sonny & Cher	October 28, 1972
Mystery, Inc. stays at an offshore hotel with Sonny and Cher when the hotel manager Milo Meekly warns them of shark men associated with Pescado Diabolico who rise from the waves. Villains: The Pescado Diabolico and his shark men/Milo Meekly and his sea scavengers
9	9	"The Spooky Fog"	Don Knotts	November 4, 1972
Mayhem ensues in the western town of Juneberry when the fog rolls in as Mystery Inc. runs into Don Knotts working as a deputy. Villains: The Skeleton/Gene Haltrey, Cemetery Ghosts/Projections by Gene Haltrey
10	10	"Scooby-Doo Meets Laurel and Hardy"	Laurel and Hardy	November 11, 1972
The Ghost of Bigfoot has been scaring everyone away from a popular skiing resort. Scooby's gang, together with Laurel and Hardy who are applying for bellhop positions, try to solve the mystery. Alternate Episode Title: "The Ghost of Bigfoot" Villain: The Ghost of Bigfoot/Jonathan Crabtree
11	11	"Ghost of the Red Baron"	The Three Stooges	November 18, 1972
The Three Stooges are in danger when Curly Joe takes up a crop-dusting job on a farm haunted by the Ghost of the Red Baron. Villain: The Ghost of the Red Baron/Mr. Siegfried
12	12	"The Ghostly Creep from the Deep"	The Harlem Globetrotters	November 25, 1972
In Florida, Mystery, Inc. and the Harlem Globetrotters encounter a mysterious ship, crewed by ghost pirates, in a swamp. Villains: The Ghosts of Redbeard and his crew/Unidentified oil baron and henchmen
13	13	"The Haunted Horseman of Hagglethorn Hall"	Davy Jones	December 2, 1972
Rock musician Davy Jones is the heir to Hagglethorn Hall, a haunted fortress that was brought over from the United Kingdom... but a phantom knight does not want him to take it over, so the gang helps him solve the mystery while contending with a frog-like moat monster. Villains: Haunted Horseman/Duke of Strathmore, Moat Monster/Cyrus Wheatley
14	14	"The Phantom of the Country Music Hall"	Jerry Reed	December 9, 1972
Scooby and the gang go to hear a concert by Jerry Reed, but discover he is missing and are told by Ben Bing and Bertha to leave the place because everything is fine. Villains: Possessed Viking Mannequin/Ben Bing, Possessed Davy Crockett Mannequin/Bertha/Unnamed Bank Robber
15	15	"The Caped Crusader Caper"	Batman and Robin	December 16, 1972
Mystery, Inc. teams up with Batman and Robin when Professor Flakey is kidnapped by the Joker and the Penguin who at one point try to scare them off disguised as a dryad and a troll. Villains: Dryad/Joker, Troll/Penguin
16	16	"The Loch Ness Mess"	The Harlem Globetrotters	December 23, 1972
Inviting the Harlem Globetrotters to Shaggy's uncle's house, the gang gets caught between colonial ghosts and a sea serpent. Villains: Ghost of Paul Revere/Morgan, Minuteman Ghost/Winslow, Redcoat Ghost/Selby, Sea Serpent/A Balloon (controlled by Morgan)

=== Season 2 (1973) ===
No. overall	No. in season	Title	Guest star(s)	Original release date
17	1	"Mystery of Haunted Island"	The Harlem Globetrotters	September 8, 1973
While intending to go on a trip to Picnic Island, the gang and the Harlem Globetrotters end up on a boat going to the nearby Haunted Island where they are greeted by ghostly goings-on while trying to prepare for their upcoming game against the Scorpions. Villains: The Three Hooded Ghosts, Apparitions of Haunted Island/The owner, coach and trainer of the Scorpions
18	2	"The Haunted Showboat"	The cast of Josie and the Pussycats	September 15, 1973
While en route to the Tom Sawyer festival during a storm, the gang gets lost on the Mississippi River along the Illinois-Missouri border and wind up getting stuck on dock near an old haunted showboat, the Dixie Queen, where they bump into Josie and the Pussycats. Villains: Captain Scavenger/Jack Canna (posing as Captain Canaby), Injun Joe/Jack's partner
19	3	"Scooby-Doo Meets Jeannie"	The cast of Jeannie	September 22, 1973
Jeannie brings Mystery, Inc. along for a time-travel trip to help stop Jadal the Evil Djinn's plan to thwart a young prince's elevation to sultan. Alternate Episode Title: "Mystery in Persia" Villain: Jadal the Evil Djinn (working with Uncle Abdullah)
20	4	"The Spirited Spooked Sports Show"	Tim Conway	September 29, 1973
The gang helps coach Tim Conway track down the ghostly athlete Fireball McFain who is haunting the students and faculty of Velma's alma mater. Things get weird when two Fireball McFains show up. Villains:Fireball McFain/Jesse Finster and Mr. Griffith's twin brother
21	5	"The Exterminator"	Don Adams	October 6, 1973
Mystery, Inc. helps out Don Adams when he is hired to exterminate the bugs in the home of known horror movie actor Lorne Chumley when Don was hired by Lorne's butler Otto. It becomes difficult as there are monsters around each corner. Villains: Various creatures/Lorne Chumley and Otto
22	6	"The Weird Winds of Winona"	The cast of Speed Buggy	October 13, 1973
The gang teams up with the Speed Buggy crew to find out why a town's population is suddenly declining, as they learn that something is strangely blowing in the wind and it is causing the residents to be fearful. Villains: The Windmakers/Mr. P.J. Peabody and three henchmen
23	7	"The Haunted Candy Factory"	Cass Elliot	October 20, 1973
Answering the cries of The Mamas and the Papas singer "Mama" Cass Elliot, Mystery, Inc. finds themselves trying to unmask the Green Globs who are running amok in her candy factory. Villains: The Green Globs/Mr. Crink and Sterling Smith (posing as Mr. Franklin)
24	8	"Scooby-Doo Meets Dick Van Dyke"	Dick Van Dyke	October 27, 1973
Mystery, Inc. arrives at a carnival run by Dick Van Dyke and assist him when a ghostly strongman begins haunting it. Alternate Episode Title: "The Haunted Carnival" Villain: The Strongman/Masked Marvel

== Voice cast ==
=== Main ===
- Don Messick – Scooby-Doo
- Casey Kasem – Norville "Shaggy" Rogers
- Frank Welker – Fred Jones
- Heather North – Daphne Blake
- Nicole Jaffe – Velma Dinkley

=== Special guest stars ===
- Don Adams – Himself (in "The Exterminator")
- Eddie "Rochester" Anderson - Bobby Joe Mason (in "The Ghostly Creep from the Deep", "The Loch Ness Mess", and "The Mystery of Haunted Island")
- John Astin – Gomez Addams (in "Wednesday Is Missing")
- Joe Besser – Babu (in "Mystery in Persia")
- Daws Butler – Larry and Curly Joe (in "Ghastly Ghost Town" and "The Ghost of the Red Baron")
- Ted Cassidy – Lurch (in "Wednesday Is Missing")
- Sonny & Cher – Themselves (in "The Secret of Shark Island")
- Tim Conway – Himself (in "The Spirit Spooked Sports Show")
- Jackie Coogan – Uncle Fester (in "Wednesday Is Missing")
- Scatman Crothers - Meadowlark Lemon (in "The Ghostly Creep from the Deep", "The Loch Ness Mess", and "The Mystery of Haunted Island")
- Phyllis Diller – Herself (in "A Good Medium Is Rare")
- Robert DoQui - Pablo Robertson (in "The Ghostly Creep from the Deep", "The Loch Ness Mess", and "The Mystery of Haunted Island")
- Sandy Duncan – Herself (in "Sandy Duncan's Jekyll and Hyde")
- Dick Van Dyke – Himself (in "The Haunted Carnival")
- Cass Elliot – Herself (in "The Haunted Candy Factory")
- Richard Elkins - J.C. "Gip" Gipson (in "The Ghostly Creep from the Deep", "The Loch Ness Mess", and "The Mystery of Haunted Island")
- Jodie Foster – Pugsley Addams (in "Wednesday Is Missing")
- Stu Gilliam - Curly Neal (in "The Ghostly Creep from the Deep", "The Loch Ness Mess", and "The Mystery of Haunted Island")
- Larry Harmon – Stan Laurel (in "The Ghost of Bigfoot"), Ghost of Bigfoot (in "The Ghost of Bigfoot")
- Pat Harrington – Moe (in "Ghastly Ghost Town" and "The Ghost of the Red Baron")
- Cindy Henderson – Wednesday Addams (in "Wednesday Is Missing")
- Don Knotts – Himself (in "Guess Who's Knott Coming to Dinner?" and "The Spooky Fog of Juneberry")
- Carolyn Jones – Morticia Addams (in "Wednesday Is Missing")
- Davy Jones – Himself (in "The Haunted Horseman of Hagglethorn Hall")
- Jim MacGeorge - Oliver Hardy (in "The Ghost of Bigfoot")
- Julie McWhirter - Jeannie
- Jerry Reed – Himself (in "The Phantom of the Country Music Hall")
- Olan Soule – Batman (in "The Dynamic Scooby-Doo Affair" and "The Caped Crusader Caper")
- Janet Waldo – Granny Frump (in "Wednesday Is Missing") and Josie (in "The Haunted Showboat")
- Johnny Williams - Geese Ausby (in "The Ghostly Creep from the Deep", "The Loch Ness Mess", and "The Mystery of Haunted Island")
- Jonathan Winters – Himself (in "The Frickert Fracas"), Maude Frickert (in "The Frickert Fracas")

== Staff ==
=== Season 1 ===
- Producers/directors: William Hanna and Joseph Barbera
- Story: Jameson Brewer, Tom Dagenais, Ruth Flippen, Fred Freiberger, Willie Gilbert, Bill Lutz, Larry Markes, Norman Maurer, Jack Mendelsohn, Ray Parker, Gene Thompson, Paul West, Harry Winkler

=== Season 2 ===
- Producers/directors: William Hanna and Joseph Barbera
- Story: Jack Mendelsohn, Tom Dagenais, Norman Maurer, Larz Bourne, Woody Kling, Sid Morse

== Home media ==
=== American sets ===
Upon attempting to release a complete DVD set of the 24-episode series in 2005, Warner Home Video was unable to negotiate agreements with several of the episodes' guest stars to have those episodes included. As a result, the DVD was released under the title The Best of the New Scooby-Doo Movies, and featured only 15 episodes culled from both seasons. The opening titles on this release were edited to remove the images of the Addams Family, Batman and Robin, the Harlem Globetrotters, the Three Stooges, and Laurel and Hardy.

On April 4, 2019, Warner Bros. announced plans to release eight more episodes, both as part of a package with the 15 previously released episodes and as a standalone release. This release was planned for the 50th anniversary of Scooby-Doo. No explanation for the previous appearances' rights issues was provided.

The only episode that has not been released or announced for release on DVD is "Wednesday Is Missing", which features the Addams Family.

Season set

DVD / Blu-ray title	Ep. #	Release date	Featurettes
The New Scooby-Doo Movies: The (Almost) Complete Collection	23	June 4, 2019	The Hanna-Barbera Kennel Club Roasts Scooby-Doo; Uptown with Scooby-Doo and the Harlem Globetrotters; The Girls Rock!

Volume sets

DVD title	Ep. #	Release date	Featurettes
The Best of The New Scooby-Doo Movies	15	March 22, 2005	The Hanna-Barbera Kennel Club Roasts Scooby-Doo; Uptown with Scooby-Doo and the Harlem Globetrotters; The Girls Rock!
The Best of The New Scooby-Doo Movies: The Lost Episodes	8	June 4, 2019	

Other releases

The two episodes featuring Batman and Robin and two of the three episodes featuring the Harlem Globetrotters were also included in two separate releases: Scooby-Doo Meets Batman and Scooby-Doo Meets the Harlem Globetrotters.

DVD / VHS title	Ep. #	Release date	Episodes
Scooby-Doo Meets Batman	2	August 20, 2002	1. "The Dynamic Scooby-Doo Affair"; 2. "The Caped Crusader Caper"
Scooby-Doo Meets the Harlem Globetrotters	2	May 6, 2003	1. "The Mystery of Haunted Island"; 2. "The Loch Ness Mess"

The Addams Family episode "Wednesday is Missing" was released to VHS in Australia under the title "Scooby-Doo Meets the Addams Family" and was also released in the U.K. on VHS, along with the Three Stooges episode "Ghastly Ghost Town" under the title "Scooby-Doo Meets the Three Stooges". "The Secret of Shark Island" (featuring Sonny and Cher) episode was released in the U.S. and the U.K. on VHS on a video called Hanna-Barbera Presents: The Best of Scooby-Doo.

=== British releases ===
Release name	Release format	Ep. #	Release date	Episodes
The New Scooby-Doo Movies	VHS	2	1987	1. "Scooby-Doo and the Three Stooges" ("Ghastly Ghost Town"); 2. "Scooby-Doo and the Addams Family" ("Wednesday is Missing"); Note: this is currently the only U.K. release with the Addams Family episode "Wednesday Is Missing."
The Best of The New Scooby-Doo Movies Volume 1	DVD	4	2005	1. "Ghastly Ghost Town"; 2. "The Dynamic Scooby-Doo Affair"; 3. "The Frickert Fracas"; 4. "Guess Who's Knott Coming to Dinner?"
The New Scooby-Doo Movies The (Almost) Complete Collection	DVD/Blu-ray	23	2019	same as the U.S. release

== See also ==
- The ABC Saturday Superstar Movie – another Saturday morning "movie" series on ABC
- Scooby-Doo and Guess Who? – another Scooby-Doo series with a similar premise
