= Indira Stefanianna =

American actress and singer

- Stefanianna in Sanford and Son (1972)
- Born: Indira Stefanianna Christopherson; December 15, 1946 (age 79); San Francisco, California, U.S.
- Occupations: Actress, singer
- Years active: 1967–2009
- Spouse: Rabindra Danks (m. 1969; div. 1980)
- Children: 1

Indira Stefanianna (born Indira Stefanianna Christopherson); also credited as Indira Danks and Stefanianna Christopherson, (born 15 December 1946) is an American actress and singer, best known for her role as the original voice of Daphne Blake on Scooby-Doo, Where Are You! during its first season (1969).

== Early life ==
Christopherson was born and raised in San Francisco, California, the daughter of father Lorne Christopherson, who was from Manitoba, Canada and mother Hrafnhildur (née Snorradóttir), who was born in Iceland.

She and her mother would sing nursery rhymes together when Christopherson was a little girl, and she aspired to one day become a professional singer and actress. After graduating high school, Christopherson studied voice and piano at the Peninsula Conservatory of Music, and attended two colleges: the College of San Mateo and San Francisco State University.

== Career ==
Christopherson has worked as a character actor, stage actress, and recording artist in addition to her voice work. At the age of 18, she moved to Iceland and had a singing career in several languages. After returning to the United States, she started her stage career by appearing in such productions as The Umbrellas of Cherbourg (directed by Andrei Șerban) at The Public Theater, playing the character of Genevieve, and off-Broadway in Harry Ruby's Songs My Mother Never Sang (directed by Paul Lazarus) and Noo Yawk Tawk (directed by Richmond Shepard), in addition to several film and television roles. She made her television debut in 1967 as that episode's bachelorette on The Dating Game. In 1968, Christopherson was cast as the lead in a film titled Reality, about a girl spending her weekend at a resort. She appeared in the Prince Street Players' musical adaptation of Cinderella in 1972.

She was also the original voice of Daphne Blake on Scooby-Doo, Where Are You! for the first season in 1969 before taking leave to move to New York with her husband, Rabindra Danks. Her replacement for the rest of the series (and various spinoffs and specials in the franchise through 2003) was Heather North. Other voice work included the role of Princess Dawn on Here Comes the Grump, which she performed while also voicing Daphne, additional voices on Captain Caveman and the Teen Angels and providing voiceovers for Scholastic Media in Clifford the Big Red Dog and the series Your Community Changes Every Day (for which she won the DuKane Citizenship Award).

Christopherson is also well known for penning and singing commercial jingles and songs. She sang in the AT&T jingle Reach Out and Touch Someone, with music composed by David Lucas, and won a Clio Award. She sang and wrote the lyrics to the song "Crystal of a Star", along with composer Doug Katsaros, which was used as the closing song for the 1986 film Star Crystal.

== Personal life ==
Christopherson married Rabindra Danks, an artist, on October 24, 1969. During their marriage they worked on albums together. After eleven years of marriage, the couple divorced on October 31, 1980. She has one son named K.C. Katsaros.

== Filmography ==
Year	Film	Role	Notes
1970	The Grasshopper	Libby	
1973	Wicked, Wicked	Genny	Credited as Indira Danks
1986	Star Crystal		Lyrics, Performer: "Crystal of a Star"
2006	Universal Remote	Indira	
2008	Knocked Down	Depressed Woman	
2009	A Mime's Life	Herself	

== Television ==
Year	Title	Role	Notes
1968	Mayberry R.F.D.	Dorothy	Episode: "The Harvest Ball"
1968	Here Come the Brides	Lu Ann	Episode: "The Stand Off"
1969	Mr. Deeds Goes to Town	Role Unknown	Episode: "Wedding Bells for Mr. Deeds"
1969	Here Comes the Grump	Princess Dawn	17 episodes, Voice role
1969–1970	Scooby-Doo, Where Are You!	Daphne Blake, Sharon Wetherby, Candy Mint	17 episodes, Voice role (first season only)
1969–1970	Stump the Stars	Herself	4 episodes
1972	Sanford and Son	Hat Check Girl	Episode: "Happy Birthday, Pop" Credited as Indira Danks
1973	M*A*S*H	Lt. O'Brien	Episode: "Love Story" Credited as Indira Danks
1977-1980	Captain Caveman and the Teen Angels	Additional voices	38 episodes, Voice role

Preceded by None	Voice of Daphne Blake; 1969–1970	Succeeded by Heather North
