= Scooby-Doo! and the Legend of the Vampire =

2003 direct-to-video film about Scooby Doo

- DVD cover
- Directed by: Scott Jeralds
- Written by: Mark Turosz
- Based on: Scooby-Doo by Hanna-Barbera, Joe Ruby and Ken Spears
- Produced by: Margaret M. Dean; Scott Jeralds
- Starring: Casey Kasem; Frank Welker; Nicole Jaffe; Heather North Kenney
- Edited by: Joe Gall
- Music by: Rich Dickerson
- Production company: Warner Bros. Animation
- Distributed by: Warner Home Video
- Release date: March 4, 2003
- Running time: 72 minutes
- Country: United States
- Language: English

Scooby-Doo! and the Legend of the Vampire is a 2003 American direct-to-video animated adventure film, and the fifth in a series of direct-to-video films based upon the Scooby-Doo Saturday-morning cartoons. It was completed in 2002, and released on March 4, 2003, and it was produced by Warner Bros. Animation, but included a copyright for Hanna-Barbera Cartoons, Inc..

It is the first Scooby-Doo direct-to-video film to have the flatter, bright art style and visuals of the What's New, Scooby-Doo? series, departing from the darker shading and effects used in the four prior released films, the first to return to the original format where the monster is not real and the first to return to a lighter tone than that of the prior and darker Scooby made-for-video films.

This film served as Joseph Barbera's first solo animated production effort without longtime partner William Hanna, who died in 2001, and is one of two direct-to-video films to reunite the 1969–73 voice cast for the human Mystery Inc. members consisting of Frank Welker, Casey Kasem, Nicole Jaffe, and Heather North. Since Don Messick died in 1997, Welker provides Scooby's voice (in addition to voicing Fred Jones).

== Plot ==
While traveling through Sydney, Australia, the Mystery Inc. gang head to a music contest being held at an Outback landmark called Vampire Rock, which they later learn got its name from a mythological Australian vampire called the Yowie Yahoo. Upon their arrival, they reunite with their friends the Hex Girls and encounter festival managers Daniel and Russell; Daniel's disapproving grandfather, Malcolm; and competing band Two Skinny Dudes. Upon learning one of the performers was kidnapped by vampires, which scared off several others, Mystery Inc. inquire further. Daniel and Russell explain that a band called Wildwind were turned into vampires by the Yowie Yahoo sometime prior and are said to haunt Vampire Rock ever since.

Taking the case, Fred Jones enters Mystery Inc. in the contest to lure out the Yowie Yahoo. While practicing, they are approached by Wildwind's former manager, Jasper Ridgeway, and his current band, the Bad Omens. Suspicious of Ridgeway, who they suspect may be forcing the Bad Omens to dress up as vampires to scare off their competition, Mystery Inc. splits up. Fred, Daphne Blake, and Velma Dinkley investigate Ridgeway's trailer, where they find Ridgeway kept mementos from Wildwind while he tries to get the Hex Girls to sign him as their manager. Shaggy Rogers and his dog Scooby-Doo stay by the food stands, but are attacked by Wildwind, who later kidnap the Bad Omens and Hex Girls.

Chasing Wildwind into nearby caves, Shaggy and Scooby stay outside while Fred, Daphne, and Velma venture inside. The trio stumble onto used camera and film equipment before they are chased out by the vampires. They jump into a pool of water to escape them, saving Shaggy and Scooby from a pack of dingoes in the process. The vampires corner the gang, but the dingoes temporarily scare them off. The Yowie Yahoo attempts to attack the group, but Scooby's collar reflects the approaching sunrise, dispelling it. Seemingly immune to the sun, Wildwind returns to chase the gang until they and Daniel trap them. The gang subsequently unmask Wildwind, revealing Russell and Two Skinny Dudes, who explain that they wanted to reunite as Wildwind and restart their career, only to learn bands were not allowed to enter the contest twice. In retaliation, they modified their costumes to better resemble vampires, created a hologram of the Yowie Yahoo, sent most of their kidnapped competitors on free Great Barrier Reef scuba diving tours, and left the Hex Girls for dead in the outback when they refused so they would be the only band left and could headline the festival. Having rescued the Hex Girls, Malcolm returns them safely while Wildwind is arrested and Daniel names Mystery Inc. the contest's winners by default.

== Voice cast ==
- Casey Kasem as Shaggy
- Frank Welker as Scooby-Doo and Fred
- Nicole Jaffe as Velma
- Heather North as Daphne
- Phil LaMarr as Daniel Illiwara and King
- Jeff Bennett as Jasper Ridgeway, Jack and Lifeguard #1
- Kevin Michael Richardson as Malcolm Illiwara, the Yowie Yahoo
- Jennifer Hale as Thorn and Queen
- Jane Wiedlin as Dusk
- Kimberly Brooks as Luna
- Michael Neill as Russell/Dark Skull and Matt Marvelous
- Tom Kenny as Harry/Stormy Weathers, Barry/Lightning Strikes and Lifeguard #2
