= Scooby-Doo, Where Are You! =

1969 American animated television series

- Genre: Mystery; Adventure; Horror comedy
- Created by: Joe Ruby; Ken Spears
- Developed by: William Hanna; Joseph Barbera; Iwao Takamoto; Fred Silverman
- Written by: Joe Ruby; Ken Spears; Bill Lutz; Larz Bourne; Tom Dagenais
- Directed by: William Hanna; Joseph Barbera
- Voices of: Don Messick; Casey Kasem; Frank Welker; Stefanianna Christopherson; Heather North; Nicole Jaffe; Pat Stevens
- Theme music composer: David Mook; Ben Raleigh
- Opening theme: "Scooby Doo, Where Are You?" performed by Larry Marks (1969–70); George A. Robertson Jr. (1970)
- Composer: Ted Nichols (1969–70)
- Country of origin: United States
- Original language: English
- No. of seasons: 3
- No. of episodes: 41 (list of episodes)

Production
- Producers: William Hanna; Joseph Barbera
- Running time: approx. 21 minutes
- Production company: Hanna-Barbera Productions

Original release
- Network: CBS
- Release: September 13, 1969 – October 31, 1970
- Network: ABC
- Release: September 9 – December 23, 1978

Related
- The New Scooby-Doo Movies (1972–1973); The Scooby-Doo Show (1976–1978)

Scooby-Doo, Where Are You! is an American animated comedy television series created by Joe Ruby and Ken Spears and produced by Hanna-Barbera for CBS. The series premiered as part of the network's Saturday morning cartoon schedule on September 13, 1969, and aired for two seasons until October 31, 1970. Reruns were broadcast for the 1971 season. In 1978, a selection of episodes from the later animated series Scooby's All-Star Laff-A-Lympics and The Scooby-Doo Show were aired on ABC under the Scooby-Doo, Where Are You! title name, and was released in a DVD set marketed as its third season. It also aired on BBC One in the United Kingdom from 1970 to 1973. The complete series is also available on Tubi.

Scooby-Doo, Where Are You! is the first incarnation of a long-running media franchise primarily consisting of animated series, films, and related merchandise.

== Overview ==
The show follows the adventures of teenagers Fred Jones, Daphne Blake, Velma Dinkley, and Shaggy Rogers, and their dog Scooby-Doo. They travel in a van known as the Mystery Machine, encountering and solving mysteries. Once solved, the group typically discovers that the perpetrator of the mystery is a disguised person who seeks to exploit a local legend or myth for personal gain.

== Episodes ==
Season	Episodes	Originally released		
Season	Episodes	First released	Last released	Network
1	17	September 13, 1969	January 17, 1970	CBS
2	8	September 12, 1970	October 31, 1970	CBS
3	16	September 9, 1978	December 23, 1978	ABC

== Voice cast ==
- Don Messick as Scooby-Doo and miscellaneous characters
- Casey Kasem as Shaggy Rogers and miscellaneous characters
- Frank Welker as Fred Jones and miscellaneous characters
- Stefanianna Christopherson (season 1) and Heather North (seasons 2–3) as Daphne Blake
- Nicole Jaffe (seasons 1–2) and Pat Stevens (season 3) as Velma Dinkley

== Production ==
Scooby-Doo, Where Are You! was the result of CBS and Hanna-Barbera's plans to create a non-violent Saturday morning program that would appease the parent watch groups that had protested the superhero-based programs of the mid-1960s. Originally titled The Mysteries Five and later Who's S-S-Scared?, Scooby-Doo, Where Are You! underwent several changes from script to screen (the most significant being the downplaying of a musical group angle). However, the basic concept—a group of teenagers and their dog solving supernatural-related mysteries—was always in place.

Scooby-Doo creators Joe Ruby and Ken Spears served as the story supervisors on the series.

== Home media ==
On March 14, 2000, Warner Home Video released five episodes from the series on a DVD entitled Scooby-Doo's Original Mysteries. They later released all 25 episodes on DVD in Region 1 on March 16, 2004 under the title Scooby-Doo, Where Are You! The Complete First and Second Seasons. A DVD entitled Scooby-Doo, Where Are You! The Complete Third Season was released on April 10, 2007, made up of episodes produced in 1978, added to the Scooby's All-Stars package, and later syndicated as part of The Scooby-Doo Show.

On November 9, 2010, Warner Home Video released Scooby-Doo, Where Are You!: The Complete Series. The eight-disc set features all 25 episodes of the series plus the 16 episodes produced in 1978 which aired as part of Scooby's All-Stars. The set is encased in special collectible packaging in the form of a Mystery Machine replica. It also features a special bonus disc filled with new and archival material. The set was re-released on November 13, 2012. A Blu-ray version of the Complete Series was released on September 3, 2019, for the series' 50th anniversary.

Starting on January 27, 2009, Warner Home Video released DVDs with four episodes each, plus an episode from Shaggy and Scooby-Doo Get a Clue. Four volumes have been released through October 19, 2010.

Scooby-Doo, Where Are You! home video releases
Season		Episodes	Release dates
Season		Episodes	Region 1
1	1969–70	17	Original Mysteries: March 14, 2000; Episode(s): "What a Night for a Knight" – "Decoy for a Dognapper" Spookiest Tales: August 21, 2001; Episode(s): "A Gaggle of Galloping Ghosts" • "Which Witch is Which?" • "That's Snow Ghost" Creepiest Capers: June 4, 2002; Episode(s): "Hassle in the Castle" • "Go Away Ghost Ship" • "A Night of Fright is No Delight" Greatest Mysteries: May 6, 2003; Episode(s): "A Clue for Scooby-Doo" • "Hassle in the Castle" • "The Backstage Rage" The Complete First and Second Seasons: March 16, 2004 / May 23, 2017 (reissue); Episode(s): Entire season featured Volume 1: A Monster Catch: January 27, 2009; Episode(s): "What a Night for a Knight" – "Mine Your Own Business" Volume 2: Bump In The Night: May 5, 2009; Episode(s): "Decoy for a Dognapper" – "Foul Play in Funland" Volume 3: Hello Mummy: September 1, 2009; Episode(s): "The Backstage Rage" – "Scooby-Doo and a Mummy, Too" Volume 4: Spooky Bayou: October 19, 2010; Episode(s): "Which Witch is Which?" – "A Night of Fright is No Delight" The Complete Series: November 9, 2010 / November 13, 2012 (reissue); Episode(s): Entire season featured
2	1970	8	Creepiest Capers: June 4, 2002; Episode(s): "The Haunted House Hang-Up" Greatest Mysteries: May 6, 2003; Episode(s): "Jeepers, It's the Creeper" The Complete First and Second Seasons: March 16, 2004 / May 23, 2017 (reissue); Episode(s): Entire season featured The Complete Series: November 9, 2010 / November 13, 2012 (reissue); Episode(s): Entire season featured
3	1978	16	The Complete Third Season: April 10, 2007 / June 6, 2017 (reissue) The Complete Series: November 9, 2010 / November 13, 2012 (reissue); Episode(s): Entire season featured
Special features
Original Mysteries: Scooby-Doo Music Video (featuring scenes from Scooby-Doo! and the Witch's Ghost) • Take the Scooby-Doo Challenge • Snack Tracks • Scooby Snack Time Spookiest Tales: Bonus episodes: The Scooby-Doo Show: "The Headless Horseman of Halloween" • "Vampire Bats and Scaredy Cats" • Mystery Inc. character bios • Trivia Creepiest Capers: Mystery Game. • Get the Picture: How to Draw Scooby-Doo. • Music Video • Mystery Inc. Yearbook Greatest Mysteries: Scooby-Doo's Greatest Mysteries music video • Barrels of Mystery Challenge The Complete First and Second Seasons: Scooby-Doo's Ultimate Fans (disc 2) • Get the Picture: How to Draw Scooby-Doo and the Gang (disc 2) • Funky Fashion (disc 3) • America Loves Scooby-Doo Music Video (disc 3) • Scooby-Doo Street Smarts (disc 4) • Take the Scooby-Doo Challenge (disc 4; original from the Original Mysteries DVD) The Complete Third Season: Hanna-Barbera: From H to B featurette Volume 1: A Monster Catch: Bonus episode: Shaggy & Scooby-Doo Get a Clue!: "Shags to Riches" Volume 2: Bump In The Night: Bonus episode: Shaggy & Scooby-Doo Get a Clue!: "More Fondue for Scooby-Doo!" Volume 3: Hello Mummy: Bonus episode: Shaggy & Scooby-Doo Get a Clue!: "High Society Scooby" Volume 4: Spooky Bayou: Bonus episode: Shaggy & Scooby-Doo Get a Clue!: "Lightning Strikes Twice"

== Reception ==
Scooby-Doo, Where Are You! was a hit for Hanna-Barbera and CBS, leading Hanna-Barbera to create series with similar concepts on ABC, NBC and CBS, including, Josie and the Pussycats, The Pebbles and Bamm-Bamm Show, The Pebbles, Dino and Bamm-Bamm segments on The Flintstone Comedy Show, The Funky Phantom, Speed Buggy, Jeannie, Jabberjaw, The Amazing Chan and the Chan Clan, Inch High, Private Eye, Goober and the Ghost Chasers, Clue Club, Captain Caveman and the Teen Angels, Butch Cassidy and the Sundance Kids, and The New Shmoo.

In 2005, Scooby-Doo, Where Are You! came 49th in Channel 4's 100 Greatest Cartoons, in the UK, and was more recently voted the 8th greatest Kids' TV Show by viewers of the same channel. It was ranked the 24th greatest cartoon on IGN's Top 100 Animated Series.

== Comic book ==
Gold Key Comics published a Scooby-Doo, Where Are You! comic books from March 1970 to February 1975.

== See also ==
- List of works produced by Hanna-Barbera Productions
- "Haunted House" and its film adaptation The Ghost and Mr. Chicken both featured staged hauntings to mask crimes
