= List of Ruby-Spears productions =

This is a list of television series, television specials and title sequences produced by Ruby-Spears Productions (also known as Ruby-Spears Enterprises).

Most of the pre-1991 library of Ruby-Spears is currently owned by Warner Bros. Television Studios through Warner Bros. Animation (except Rambo: The Force of Freedom, It's Punky Brewster and Piggsburg Pigs!).

== Television series ==
Title	Years	Network	Notes	Co-production with	Episodes
Fangface	1978–1979	ABC			24
The Plastic Man Comedy/Adventure Show: Fangface and Fangpuss; Mighty Man and Yukk; Rickety Rocket	1979–1981	ABC		DC Comics (Plastic Man segments)	112
Heathcliff and Dingbat: Heathcliff; Dingbat and the Creeps	1980–1981	ABC		McNaught Syndicate	13
Thundarr the Barbarian	1980–1981	ABC			21
Heathcliff and Marmaduke: Heathcliff; Marmaduke	1981–1982	ABC		McNaught Syndicate and United Feature Syndicate	13
Goldie Gold and Action Jack	1981–1982	ABC			13
The Scooby & Scrappy-Doo/Puppy Hour: Scooby-Doo & Scrappy-Doo; Scrappy & Yabba-Doo; The Puppy's New Adventures	1982–1983	ABC	The Puppy's New Adventures segments produced by Ruby-Spears; Scooby-Doo & Scrappy-Doo and Scrappy & Yabba-Doo segments written at Hanna-Barbera & animated at Ruby-Spears	Hanna-Barbera	13
Mork & Mindy/Laverne & Shirley/Fonz Hour: Mork & Mindy	1982–1983	ABC	Mork & Mindy segments written at Hanna-Barbera & animated at Ruby-Spears; Laverne & Shirley with the Fonz segments produced by Hanna-Barbera	Hanna-Barbera	27
The Pac-Man/Rubik, the Amazing Cube Hour: Rubik, the Amazing Cube	1983–1984	ABC	Rubik, the Amazing Cube produced by Ruby-Spears; Pac-Man segments produced by Hanna-Barbera	Hanna-Barbera	44
Mister T	1983–1985	NBC			30
Alvin and the Chipmunks	1983–1988	NBC	Seasons 1–5; Seasons 6–8 were produced by Murakami-Wolf-Swenson and later DIC Enterprises)	Bagdasarian Productions	52/102
Saturday Supercade: Frogger (1983); Donkey Kong; Pitfall! (1983); Q*bert; Donkey Kong Junior (1983); Kangaroo (1984); Space Ace (1984)	1983–1985	CBS		Nintendo (Donkey Kong and Donkey Kong Junior segments)	26
The Puppy's Further Adventures	1983–1984	ABC			21
Dragon's Lair	1984	ABC			13
Turbo Teen	1984–1985	ABC			13
Sectaurs	1985	Syndication	Miniseries		5
It's Punky Brewster	1985–1987	NBC		NBC Studios	26
Centurions	1986–1987	Syndication	Began as a 5-episode miniseries before becoming a full series in 1986	Nippon Sunrise	65
Lazer Tag Academy	1986–1987	NBC		Worlds of Wonder Saban Entertainment	13
Rambo: The Force of Freedom	1986	Syndication		Carolco Pictures	65
Chuck Norris: Karate Kommandos	1986	Syndication	Miniseries		5
Police Academy: The Series	1988–1989	Syndication		Warner Bros. Television	65
Superman	1988	CBS		DC Comics	13
Dink, the Little Dinosaur	1989–1990	CBS			21
Piggsburg Pigs!	1990	Fox		The Fred Silverman Company and The Sy Fischer Company	13
Wild West C.O.W.-Boys of Moo Mesa	1993–1994	ABC	Season 2 only; Season 1 was animated by Gunther-Wahl Productions.	Greengrass Productions	13/26
Mega Man	1994–1996	Syndication	Distributed by The Summit Media Group	Ashi Productions	27
Skysurfer Strike Force	1995–1996	Syndication	Distributed by Bohbot Productions	Ashi Productions	26

== Television specials ==
Title	Year	Network	Co-production with	Notes
The Puppy Who Wanted a Boy	1978	ABC		ABC Weekend Specials
Weep No More, My Lady	1979	ABC		ABC Weekend Specials
The Horse That Played Center Field	1979	ABC		ABC Weekend Specials
The Puppy's Great Adventure	1979	ABC		ABC Weekend Specials
The Incredible Detectives	1979	ABC		ABC Weekend Specials
The Puppy's Amazing Rescue	1980	ABC		ABC Weekend Specials
The Trouble with Miss Switch	1980	ABC		ABC Weekend Specials
Scruffy	1980	ABC		ABC Weekend Specials
The Puppy Saves the Circus	1981	ABC		ABC Weekend Specials
Bunnicula, the Vampire Rabbit	1982	ABC		ABC Weekend Specials
Miss Switch to the Rescue	1982	ABC		ABC Weekend Specials
Beauty and the Beast	1983	CBS	Triple Seven Concepts	Kenner Family Classics
I Love the Chipmunks Valentine Special	1984	NBC	Bagdasarian Productions	
Bad Cat	1984	ABC		ABC Weekend Specials
Rose Petal Place	1984	Syndication	David Kirschner Productions	
The Cabbage Patch Kids' First Christmas	1984	ABC	Heywood Kling Productions and Original Appalachian Artworks	
Robo Force: The Revenge of Nazgar	1984	Syndication		
A Chipmunk Reunion	1985	NBC	Bagdasarian Productions	
Rose Petal Place: Real Friends	1985	Syndication	David Kirschner Productions	
The Magic Flute	1994	ABC	Greengrass Productions	ABC Weekend Specials
Jirimpimbira: An African Folktale	1995	ABC	Huff-Douglass Productions	ABC Weekend Specials

== Other works ==
=== Titles and sequences ===
Title	Year	Co-production with	Notes
Child's Play	1988	United Artists	Provided animation sequences
Child's Play 3	1991	Universal Pictures	Provided animation sequences

== Hanna-Barbera Classics Collection ==
The Hanna-Barbera Classics Collection (once called the Hanna-Barbera Golden Collection, later called the Hanna-Barbera Diamond Collection) is a series of two-to-four-disc DVD box sets from Warner Home Video and later by Warner Archive, usually containing complete seasons and complete series of various classic Hanna-Barbera (with MGM Cartoons and Ruby-Spears) cartoons (along with the television movies and specials). The line began in March 2004.

=== Warner Archive releases ===
==== 2010 ====
- Thundarr the Barbarian: The Complete Series (December 17, 2010)

==== 2011 ====
- Chuck Norris: Karate Kommandos: The Complete Series (April 1, 2011)
- Mister T: The Complete First Season (May 10, 2011)
- Dragon's Lair (September 20, 2011)

==== 2015 ====
- Centurions: Part 1 (July 21, 2015)

==== 2016 ====
- Centurions: Part 2 (March 15, 2016)

==== 2017 ====
- Dink, the Little Dinosaur: The Complete Series (October 10, 2017)

=== Blu-ray releases ===
==== 2021 ====
- Thundarr the Barbarian: The Complete Series (March 16, 2021) (Ruby-Spears)
