= Scruffy (1980 film) =

- Written by: Sheldon Stark
- Directed by: Charles A. Nichols
- Voices of: Nancy McKeon; Hans Conried; June Foray; Alan Young; Michael Bell
- Narrated by: Alan Young
- Music by: Dean Elliott
- Country of origin: United States
- Original language: English

Production
- Executive producers: Joe Ruby; Ken Spears
- Producer: Jerry Eisenberg
- Running time: 70 minutes
- Production company: Ruby-Spears Productions

Original release
- Network: ABC
- Release: October 4 – October 18, 1980

Scruffy is a 1980 animated film produced by Ruby-Spears Productions and based on the 1978 British children's book Scruffy: The Tuesday Dog by Jack Stoneley. It originally aired in three parts on ABC Weekend Special series on October 4, 11 and 18, 1980 and was also the first animated television special to be shown in three parts on consecutive Saturday mornings.

== Synopsis ==
Scruffy is a puppy with beautiful eyes, a loving heart and an eager intelligence, born in a deserted house she shares with her mother, Duchess. The story begins when Duchess' owners decide to move from their house to an apartment building and give Duchess to their neighbor Helen. However, Duchess sneaks back into the boarded up house and misses Helen when she comes by looking for her. Afterwards, Duchess gives birth to Scruffy. A demolition crew begins a controlled burn of the house which forces the dogs to escape through the chimney onto the roof. They are briefly adopted by their kindly rescuers who cannot bear to send them to the animal shelter and a possible untimely death. Soon, however, Duchess insists that she and Scruffy set off to find her original owners. Tragedy strikes when Duchess is shot dead by 2 hunters who mistakes them for wild dogs threatening their sheep, leaving Scruffy on her own in the countryside, until she finds her way to a nearby city.

The orphaned Scruffy, frightened and freezing is alone in the big city until she finds an affectionate new master, a ragged but regal Shakespearean street performer named Joe Tibbles. Scruffy successfully howls her way into his act and cleverly learns every trick the old man can teach. Their happiness is only fleeting – Mr. Tibbles collapses, having a heart attack. As he is being taken away to a hospital in an ambulance, Scruffy chases after it; accidentally tumbling into a swirling river in the process.

Butch, a tough stray with a heart of gold rescues the drowning Scruffy and takes her to join his motley family of strays (Randy, Collie, Sam and Solo); these dogs have setup a canine commune in an abandoned station wagon in a junkyard. Scruffy and the strays are eventually betrayed by a thief named Catlin and his dog Caesar, caught by dog catchers and thrown in the pound to face their doom. There the dogs bark loudly for attention from people coming by hoping to get adopted. Scruffy and Butch, having been caught on a Tuesday are quickly running out of time, knowing that after a week, dogs are disposed of. Luckily, the day Scruffy and Butch are to be put down, an article is published by a local reporter titled, "Scruffy The Dog In The Tuesday Cage" and is about how strays like Scruffy have only a week to find a home. As a result, Scruffy and Butch are given an extra day and are saved just in time along with all the other dogs in the pound who all found a loving owner. Scruffy grows up to have puppies of her own with Butch.

In the epilogue, the narrator states that the story of Scruffy the stray was a true story, but that most strays are not as lucky and that millions of them are "abandoned by unfeeling people, hungry, neglected, lost; it shouldn't be that way. Maybe some of us can think of ways to change it".

== Voices ==
- Nancy McKeon – Scruffy the English Springer Spaniel
- Hans Conried – Joe Tibbles/Solo the Scottish Terrier
- June Foray – Duchess, Scruffy's mother
- Alan Young – Narrator/Sam the Irish Terrier
- Michael Bell – Butch the Bull Terrier mix/Randy the Boxer
- Linda Gary – Collie the Rough Collie
- Frank Welker – Caesar the Rottweiler/Ken
- Janet Waldo – Alice

== Home media ==
Scruffy was first released on VHS by Worldvision Home Video in the early 1980s and later re-released on VHS by Kids Klassics Home Video in 1989.

== See also ==
- List of Ruby-Spears productions
- ABC Weekend Special
