= The Trouble with Miss Switch =

1980 animated television special

- Genre: Animation; Family; Fantasy
- Written by: Sheldon Stark
- Directed by: Charles A. Nichols
- Voices of: Janet Waldo; Eric Taslitz; Nancy McKeon; June Foray; Frank Welker
- Music by: Dean Elliott
- Country of origin: United States
- Original language: English

Production
- Executive producers: Joe Ruby and Ken Spears
- Producer: Jerry Eisenberg
- Running time: 60 minutes
- Production company: Ruby-Spears Productions

Original release
- Network: ABC
- Release: February 16 – February 23, 1980

The Trouble with Miss Switch is a 1980 animated film produced by Ruby-Spears, based on the 1971 children's book by Barbara Brooks Wallace, originally aired in two parts on ABC Weekend Special on February 16 and 23, 1980.

The film's popularity resulted in several reruns as well as the 1982 sequel Miss Switch to the Rescue.

== Synopsis ==
Rupert Brown and Amelia Daley are classmates at Pepperdine Elementary School who discover that their substitute teacher, Miss Switch, is a witch complete with a magical talking black cat named Bathsheba. She tells the children that the wicked witch Saturna has taken control of the Witches' Council and has condemned the fair Miss Switch with the aid of her Computer Witch. Rupert suggests bewitching a certain football player's number at the big game to ensure victory, but Saturna causes the spell to backfire so that the visiting team wins. Rupert comes up with another plan, but asks Miss Switch to let him and Amelia accompany her.

Miss Switch and Bathsheba fly to Witch Mountain with Rupert and Amelia. Saturna sends out her bats to attack them, which causes the broom to splinter; some bats carry Miss Switch away, while the others drop Rupert, Amelia and Bathsheba down a well. Miss Switch finds herself in the council room, where the Witches' Council prepares their verdict. The children and Bathsheba get out of the well, and sneak in disguised as witches. Just as Miss Switch agrees to be banished, her friends reveal that her ability to spread love and joy is the most original witchcraft idea of all. After the Computer Witch explodes from Rupert and Amelia’s speech, the Witches' Council banishes Saturna and appoints Miss Switch the new Head Witch. The next day, Miss Switch tells the kids that she’s to return to Witch Mountain as she says goodbye to Rupert and Amelia.

== Voices ==
- Janet Waldo—Miss Switch, Council Witches
- Eric Taslitz—Rupert Brown
- Nancy McKeon—Amelia Daley
- June Foray—Bathsheba, Saturna, and Council Witches
- Frank Welker—Hector and Computer Witch
- Philip Tanzini—Banana, Bill Swanson, Rudy Lopez and Conrad
- Alan Dinehart—Caruso, Football Announcer

== Production ==
- Executive Producers: Joe Ruby & Ken Spears
- Produced by: Jerry Eisenberg
- Directed by: Charles A. Nichols
- Written by: Sheldon Stark
- Story Direction: Ron Campbell
- Voice Direction: Alan Dinehart
- Layout Supervisor: Larry Huber
- Music: Dean Elliott

== Home video ==
The 1991 VHS release The Miss Switch Mystery Special from Strand VCI Entertainment features The Trouble with Miss Switch alongside Miss Switch to the Rescue.

== See also ==
- Miss Switch to the Rescue
- List of Ruby-Spears productions
- ABC Weekend Special
