= Miss Switch to the Rescue =

- Genre: Animation; Adventure; Comedy; Drama; Family; Fantasy
- Based on: Miss Switch to the Rescue by Barbara Brooks Wallace
- Written by: Sheldon Stark
- Directed by: Charles A. Nichols
- Voices of: Janet Waldo; Eric Taslitz; Nancy McKeon; Hans Conried; Walker Edmiston; June Foray; Anne Lockhart; Hal Smith; Philip Tanzini; Willie Tyler
- Music by: Dean Elliott
- Country of origin: United States
- Original language: English

Production
- Executive producers: Joe Ruby and Ken Spears
- Running time: 60 minutes
- Production company: Ruby-Spears Productions

Original release
- Network: ABC
- Release: January 16 – January 23, 1982

Miss Switch to the Rescue is a 1982 animated film and a sequel to The Trouble with Miss Switch (1980) produced by Ruby-Spears Productions. It is based on the 1981 children's book by Barbara Brooks Wallace and originally aired in two parts on ABC Weekend Special series on January 16 and 23, 1982. It also features the final role for actor Hans Conried, who died only a few weeks before the first part aired.

The special was rebroadcast on ABC in April/May 1982, as well as June 1983, February 1985, July 1986, April 1987 and February 1989.

== Synopsis ==
Rupert Brown and Amelia Daley receive a mysterious package from a spooky old crone: a ship inside a bottle with a miniature man aboard. Rupert opens the bottle, unwittingly releasing the evil warlock Mordo, who quickly kidnaps Amelia. Rupert calls upon the good witch Miss Switch to use her magic powers to rescue Amelia. Miss Switch conjures The Witches Encyclopedia and traces Mordo and Amelia to the year 1640, when good witches imprisoned Mordo in the bottle. Traveling back in time on her broomstick, Miss Switch and Rupert eventually find Amelia on Mordo's pirate ship, where the warlock is about to administer his evil potion to mayor Daley. They manage to rescue Amelia, but Mordo is still able to transform the mayor into a troll. Upon their return to the present, Amelia and Rupert learn from Miss Switch's magic encyclopedia that the real power behind this diabolical plot is Saturna, meddling from afar on the Island of Fire and Ice. As Saturna vows to get her revenge, Amelia begins to fade away and then vanishes – a disappearance Miss Switch knows will be permanent unless Amelia is saved by sunset.

Miss Switch rewinds the clock to bring back Amelia, then uses the additional time to mix an antidote potion. Miss Switch uses ingredients in the school science lab, with the addition of unicorn dust. Mordo kidnaps the classroom of children on his flying pirate ship. An expanded rescue mission unfolds, culminating with the troll Thaddeus drinking the antidote, transforming back into Mayor Daley, who is in fact Amelia's 300-years-removed grandfather. Angered by the turn of events, Saturna battles Mordo with magic, causing a massive cave-in that traps them both in ice. Miss Switch safely returns all the children to school, magically ensuring the other classmates forget the whole incident. When Rupert asks Miss Switch if they'll ever see her again, she and Bathsheba vanish on her broomstick, leaving behind the response "Who Knows?" on the chalkboard.

== Voices ==
- Janet Waldo—Miss Switch
- Eric Taslitz—Rupert Brown
- Nancy McKeon—Amelia Daley
- Hans Conried—Mordo, the Warlock
- Walker Edmiston—Witch's Book / Old Salt / Mayor
- June Foray—Bathsheba / Saturna
- Anne Lockhart— Teacher / Barmaid
- Hal Smith—Smirch
- Philip Tanzini—Banana / Conrad

== Production ==
- Executive Producers: Joe Ruby & Ken Spears
- Directed by: Charles A. Nichols
- Written by: Sheldon Stark
- Story Direction: Ron Campbell
- Voice Direction: Alan Dinehart
- Layout Supervision: Larry Huber
- Music: Dean Elliott

== Home media ==
The 1991 VHS release The Miss Switch Mystery Special from Strand VCI Entertainment features both The Trouble with Miss Switch and Miss Switch to the Rescue.

== See also ==
- The Trouble with Miss Switch
- List of Ruby-Spears productions
- ABC Weekend Special
