= The Incredible Detectives =

- Written by: Mark Evanier
- Directed by: Rudy Larriva
- Voices of: Marlene Aragon; Laurie Main; Frank Welker; Albert Eisenmann
- Music by: Dean Elliott
- Country of origin: United States
- Original language: English

Production
- Executive producers: Joe Ruby and Ken Spears
- Producer: Jerry Eisenberg
- Running time: 23 minutes
- Production company: Ruby-Spears Productions

Original release
- Network: ABC
- Release: November 17, 1979

The Incredible Detectives is a 1979 animated television special produced by Ruby-Spears Productions and based on the 1972 children's book by Don and Joan Caufield. It originally aired on ABC Weekend Special series on November 17, 1979.

== Synopsis ==
A trio of pets – Madame Cheng, a slightly vain Siamese cat; Hennessy, a gabby black crow; and Reggie, a sophisticated English bulldog – decide to join forces as "The Incredible Detectives". One day, Davey Morrison – the three pets' master and the son of a government scientist – is kidnapped by a group of underground adversaries. His parents receive a ransom note demanding secret missile plans in exchange for Davey. In desperation, the Morrison family hires Detective Sharpe, a bumbling police detective who quickly gets nowhere with the case. Overhearing the conversation between the Morrisons and the Detective of how Davey disappeared and what the kidnappers want, the family pets swing into action and set out on their own to investigate.

== Voices ==
- Marlene Aragon – Madame Cheng
- Laurie Main – Reggie
- Frank Welker – Hennessy
- Albert Eisenmann – Davey Morrison

== Home media ==
The Incredible Detectives was released on VHS by Worldvision Home Video in 1985.

== See also ==
- List of Ruby-Spears productions
- ABC Weekend Special
