= The Secret World of Og (film) =

1983 animated TV special

- Written by: Mark Evanier
- Directed by: Steve Lumley
- Voices of: Janet Waldo
- Music by: Ian Mason
- Country of origin: United States
- Original language: English

Production
- Executive producers: Joe Ruby; Ken Spears
- Producer: Doug Paterson
- Running time: 70 minutes
- Production companies: Hanna-Barbera Productions; Hanna-Barbera Australia Pty, Ltd.

Original release
- Network: ABC
- Release: April 30 – May 14, 1983

The Secret World of Og is a 1983 animated film produced by Hanna-Barbera's Australian subsidiary (Hanna-Barbera Australia Pty. Ltd.) and based on the 1961 novel by Pierre Berton. It originally aired in three parts on ABC Weekend Special series on April 30, May 7 and 14, 1983.

== Plot ==
A small green elfin creature visits a family of five young siblings (Penny, Pamela, Peter, Patsy and Pollywog) and their pets (Yukon King, a dog and Fearless, a cat) to help himself to their comic books. The children follow the creature through a secret downward passageway under their clubhouse into a colorful underground realm of Og, a world of small green people who love games of make-believe. The inhabitants of this cavetown mimic the characters of the children's favorite comic books. After the children and their pets manage to save their siblings Paul “Pollywog” and Penny, the Ogs hunt down the children, mistaking them for snake people and confusing their lives with the comic book stories they’ve read. The og’s assume the children to be spies. The youngest brother Peter, takes disguise as their sheriff and paints himself green, in an attempt to fool the ogs and save his brother and sisters. Peter, Penny, Patsy, Pamela and Pollywog all manage to escape the og’s and their games after discovering the ogs just act out comic book stories in their underground home because their lives are so dull, as they have no education and their only food to cook are different types of mushrooms. After realizing the ogs have assumed the children to be snake people due to their sister patsy’s pet snake, the elder og corrects the others and the children explain to the ogs that there never were any snake people, and the ogs just happen to enjoy playing games and tricks. The children are allowed to leave, and the ogs live their lives playing pretend and reading comic books underground.

== Voices ==
- Fred Travalena – Og, Old Man, Glub Villager
- Janet Waldo – Mother, Old Lady
- Noelle North – Penny
- Josh Rodine – Peter
- Marissa Mendanhall – Pamela
- Julie McWhirter-Dees – Pollywog, Green Lady, Woman
- Peter Cullen – Yukon Pete, Earless, Long John Silver
- Richard Beals – Floog, Flub, Blib, Little Green Man #2, Og Boy
- Hamilton Camp – Sheriff, Little Green Man #1, Butcher, Villager, Mushroom Harvester
- Dick Erdman – Pirate #1, Mayor, Man
- Brittany Wilson – Patsy
- Michael Rye – Worker, Cowboy #1, Green Deputy, Narrator
- Joe Medalis – Victim #2, Green Man, Glog, Doctor
- Andre Stojka – Victim #1, Elder Og, Og Father

== Production credits ==
- Written by: Mark Evanier
- Based on the book by: Pierre Berton
- Recording Director: Gordon Hunt
- Casting: Ginny McSwain
- Recorded at: B and B Sound by Ken Berger
- Voices: Fred Travalena, Janet Waldo, Noelle North, Josh Rodine, Marissa Mendanhall, Julie McWhirter-Dees, Peter Cullen, Richard Beals, Hamilton Camp, Brittany Wilson, Dick Erdman, Michael Rye, Joe Medalis, Andre Stojka
- Storyboard and Character Design: Steve Lumley
- Timing: Chris Cuddington
- Staging Design: Deane Taylor, Mike Trebert, Simon O'Leary, Peter Sheehan
- Background Styling: Richard Zaloudek, Mike King-Prime
- Background Artists: Jerry Liew, Rod Simpson
- Animation Supervisors: Gerry Grabner, Di Rudder
- Special Effects Animator: Henry Neville
- Animators: Sue Beak, Dick Dunn, Greg Ingram, John McClenahan, Paul Maron, Mike Stapleton, Richard Slapscinski, Peter Eastmant, Di Rudder, Peter Gardiner, Cynthia Leech, Paul McAdam, Pam Lofts, Don McKinnon, Chris Hauge, Don Ezard
- Assistant Animators: Paul Baker, Karen Barboutis, Christopher Green, Rodney Brunsdon, Denise Kirkham, Jim Wylie, Peter Jones, Lianne Hughes, James Baker, Kevin Peaty, David Law
- Inbetweening Supervisor: Helen McAdam
- Animation Checking: Ellen Bayley, Brodee Myers, Ian Hibble, Lyn McLean, Lauralei Wethy, Kim Marden
- Colour Styling: Esther Ginat
- Xerox: Joan Lawson, Sven Christoffeson
- Paint Supervisor: Donene Bailey
- Production Manager: Jack Pietruska
- Co-ordinator: Roz Wiseman
- Production Accountant: Wayne Dearing
- Camera Department: Renée Robinson, Tanya Viskich, Tibor Papp, Mark Benvenuti, John Ilmenstein, Jan Cregan
- Music by: Ian Mason
- Recorded at: Music Farm Studios
- Editing: Robert Ciaglia
- Sound Effects: Angello Revello
- Sound Mixing: Peter Fenton at United Sound Studios
- Neg Matching: Chris Rowell Productions
- Processed by: Atlab Australia
- Producer: Doug Paterson
- Associate Producer: Steve Lumley
- Animation Director: Geoff Collins
- Directed by: Steve Lumley
- Produced by: Hanna-Barbera Australia Pty. Ltd.

== See also ==
- List of works produced by Hanna-Barbera Productions
- ABC Weekend Special

== Home media ==
The Secret World of Og was released on DVD in Region 1 by Visual Entertainment (VEI) in September 2011.
