= The Puppy's Further Adventures =

- Based on: The Puppy Who Wanted a Boy by Jane Thayer
- Developed by: Joe Ruby; Ken Spears
- Directed by: Charles A. Nichols (1982); Rudy Larriva; John Kimball (1983); Norm McCabe (1983)
- Voices of: Billy Jacoby; Nancy McKeon; Michael Bell; Peter Cullen
- Narrated by: Billy Jacoby
- Composer: Dean Elliott
- Country of origin: United States
- No. of seasons: 2
- No. of episodes: 21

Production
- Executive producers: Joe Ruby; Ken Spears; Bill Hanna (1982); Joseph Barbera (1982)
- Producers: Joe Ruby (1982); Ken Spears (1982); Mark Jones (1983)
- Running time: 30 minutes
- Production companies: Ruby-Spears Enterprises; Hanna-Barbera Productions (season 1)

Original release
- Network: ABC
- Release: September 25, 1982 – November 10, 1984

The Puppy's Further Adventures (originally titled The Puppy's New Adventures for season one) is a 30-minute Saturday morning animated series produced by Ruby-Spears Enterprises (in association with Hanna-Barbera Productions for its first season only) and broadcast on ABC from September 25, 1982 to November 10, 1984. It is based on characters created by Jane Thayer about Petey, a young dog who attached himself to a lonely orphan boy named Tommy.

== Overview ==
Petey the puppy was originally introduced in four half-hour television specials which aired as part of ABC Weekend Specials series from 1978 to 1981: The Puppy Who Wanted a Boy, The Puppy's Great Adventure, The Puppy's Amazing Rescue and The Puppy Saves the Circus.

The Puppy Who Wanted a Boy and its three sequels were frequently rebroadcast on ABC Weekend Specials and proved so popular with its annual replays that ABC commissioned a television series. In September 1982, Petey could be seen weekly in The Puppy's New Adventures as part of the second half of The Scooby & Scrappy-Doo/Puppy Hour block with Billy Jacoby voicing Petey and Nancy McKeon as his female puppy girlfriend Dolly. The following year, Petey and his pals were given their own half-hour timeslot in a follow-up series under the new title The Puppy's Further Adventures. Following the show's original run, a repackaging of both seasons were shown in reruns under the title The Puppy's Great Adventures on ABC in 1984 and resurfaced on CBS in 1986.

== Characters ==
- Petey (voiced by Billy Jacoby): A Beagle mix puppy who is the young leader of the group and whose loyal and loving girlfriend is Dolly.
- Dolly (voiced by Nancy McKeon): A female Spaniel Cross puppy who is cheerful and outgoing and is also Petey's girlfriend. She is the only female in the group.
- Duke (voiced by Michael Bell): A German Shepherd/Labrador Retriever mix who is the leader of the group; he cares for Petey and his other friends.
- Dash (voiced by Michael Bell): A Greyhound who is sleek, speedy and the smartest member of the group, but can be cowardly at times, although he can be brave if he wants to.
- Lucky (voiced by Peter Cullen): A St. Bernard who is the big guy of the group; he is strong, kind and wise, but not too bright.
- Glyder (voiced by Josh Rodine): A puppy whose large ears enabled him to fly. He only appeared in three episodes.
- Tommy: Petey and Dolly's original owner. Petey and his fellow dogs were reunited with him and his parents in 1983.
- Tommy's father and mother.

== Episodes ==
=== ABC Weekend Specials (1978–81) ===
The Puppy was originally introduced in four half-hour television specials which aired as part of ABC Weekend Specials.

No.	Title	Directed by	Written by	Original release date
1	The Puppy Who Wanted a Boy	Rudy Larriva	Barbara Avedon, Barbara Corday	May 6, 1978
Petey the puppy (voiced by Todd Turquand) goes through a series of harrowing adventures as he sets out to the city to adopt a boy of his own.
2	The Puppy's Great Adventure	Rudy Larriva	Sheldon Stark	May 12, 1979
Petey (voiced by Bryan Scott) is determined to prove he is an individual when his young owner Tommy is adopted by parents who don't like dogs.
3	The Puppy's Amazing Rescue	Rudy Larriva	Sheldon Stark	January 26, 1980
Petey (voiced by Bryan Scott) and Dolly (voiced by Nancy McKeon) have to outwit poachers, a hungry bear and a hawk to rescue their humans from an avalanche.
4	The Puppy Saves the Circus	Rudy Larriva	Sheldon Stark	September 12, 1981
When Petey (voiced by Sparky Marcus) suffers a memory loss, he finds fame as a performer which saves the fortunes of a struggling family circus.

=== The Puppy's New Adventures (1982) ===
The first season featured Petey and Dolly's family moving overseas by ship; their friends Duke, Dash and Lucky stowed away on the same ship. All five dogs were stranded together when a lightning bolt knocked them overboard. Every episode consisted of the dogs looking for Tommy and his family, winding up in places as diverse as East Berlin, Australia, Hong Kong, Hawaii and usually helping out a local group of people or animals.

No.	Title	Written by	Original release date
1	"The Treasure of the Ancient Ruins"	Unknown	September 25, 1982
2	"The Puppy's Dangerous Mission"	Cliff Ruby & Elena Lesser	October 2, 1982
3	"An American Puppy in Paris"	Mark Jones	October 9, 1982
4	"The Puppy and the Pirates"	Unknown	October 16, 1982
5	"The Mystery of the Wailing Cat"	Unknown	October 23, 1982
6	"The Puppy's Australian Adventure"	Steve Gerber	October 30, 1982
7	"Puppy and the Reluctant Bull"	Mark Jones	November 6, 1982
8	"The Puppy's Hong Kong Adventure"	Cliff Ruby, Elena Lesser & Buzz Dixon	November 13, 1982
9	"Honolulu Puppy"	Unknown	November 20, 1982
10	"The Puppy's Great Escape"	Unknown	November 27, 1982
11	"The Puppy's Great Race"	Unknown	December 4, 1982
12	"The Puppy's Amazon Adventure"	Unknown	December 11, 1982
13	"Petey and the 101 Seals"	Unknown	December 18, 1982

=== The Puppy's Further Adventures (1983) ===
The second season opened with a two-part episode in which the dogs are finally reunited with Tommy's family. The rest of the season featured the dogs' adventures with the family while travelling all around the United States. The season opener introduced Glyder, a puppy with ears so large he could fly like Dumbo. Glyder re-appeared in two other episodes.

No.	Title	Written by	Original release date
14	"Glyder, the Misfit Puppy"	Mark Jones	September 10, 1983
15	"Puppy Goes Home"	Mark Jones	September 17, 1983
16	"Puppy and the Badlands"	Flint Dille & Mark Jones	September 24, 1983
17	"Puppy in Omega World"	Michael J. Reeves, Mark Scott Zicree, Mark Jones, & Steve Gerber	October 1, 1983
18	"Puppy and the Spies"	Janie Diamond	October 8, 1983
The dogs uncover a plot by enemy spies to sabotage a rocket launch. Note: Fangface and Puggsy have cameos in this episode when the dogs are watching an episode of Fangface on TV.
19	"Puppy Goes to College"	Martin Pasko	October 15, 1983
Three siblings steal chemicals from a college chemistry lab as part of their plan to kidnap the Governor, who sent their brother to prison.
20	"Puppy and the Brown Eyed Girl"	Unknown	October 22, 1983
21	"Biggest Diamond in the World"	Sheldon Stark	October 29, 1983
A huge diamond is stolen, and replaced with a fake. Note: Third and final appearance of Glyder.

== Broadcast history ==
The Puppy series was originally broadcast in these following formats on ABC and CBS:

- The Puppy's New Adventures (September 25, 1982 – September 3, 1983, ABC) (as part of The Scooby & Scrappy-Doo/Puppy Hour)
- The Puppy's Further Adventures (September 10, 1983 – September 1, 1984, ABC)
- The Puppy's Great Adventures (September 8, 1984 – November 10, 1984, ABC)
- The Puppy's Great Adventures (September 13, 1986 – November 8, 1986, CBS)

== Voices ==
- Billy Jacoby as Petey
- Michael Bell as Dash and Duke
- Peter Cullen as Lucky
- Nancy McKeon as Dolly

=== Additional voices ===
- Dick Beals
- Virginia Christine
- Cathleen Cordell
- Dave Coulier
- Jack DeLeon
- Alan Dinehart
- Hector Elias
- Michael Evans
- Al Fann
- Bernard Fox
- Alejandro Garay
- Linda Gary
- Kelly Glen
- Johnny Haymer
- Bob Holt
- Greg LaStrapes
- Keye Luke
- Chuck McCann
- Julio Medina
- Tonyo Melendez
- Tony O'Dell
- Alan Oppenheimer
- Pat Parris
- Evan Richards
- Josh Roone
- Neil Ross
- Bill Scott
- Joe Silver
- John Stephenson
- Larry Storch
- Janet Waldo
- Frank Welker
- Alan Young

== Merchandising ==
- The Puppy's New Adventures stuffed animal toys of Petey and Dolly manufactured by Etone International (1982)
- A series of three children's literature books by Antioch Publishing Company (1983):
  - The Puppy's New Adventures: ABC with Petey and His Friends (A Little Shape book)
  - The Puppy's New Adventures: Hide and Seek (A What's Inside? Pop-Open book)
  - The Puppy's New Adventures: The Puppy Who Wanted a Boy (A Collector book with stickers)
- A 15-piece jigsaw puzzle of The Puppy's Further Adventures by Playskool titled "Tommy's Circus Act" featuring Tommy, Petey and Dolly (1983)
- A Milton Bradley board game titled The Puppy's Further Adventures Game for 2 to 4 players, ages 5 to 10 (1984)
- A collection of four 25-piece frame-tray puzzles of The Puppy's Further Adventures by Milton Bradley featuring Petey, Dolly, Duke, Dash, Lucky and Glyder (1984)
- The Puppy's Further Adventures 80-piece jigsaw puzzle by Hestair Puzzles (UK, 1984)
- The Puppy's Great Adventures coloring book by Western Publishing (1985)
- A French language 7" vinyl single of The Puppy's Further Adventures titled "Les Poupies" (sung by Véronique Bodoin) by Polydor Records (France, 1985)

== In other languages ==
- French: Les Poupies
- German: Die Welpen Neue Abenteuer
- Italian: Nuove avventure del cucciolo
- Brazilian Portuguese: As Aventuras de Puppy
- Spanish: Petey y los perros
