= Piggsburg Pigs! =

- Genre: Comedy
- Created by: Melissa Silverman
- Written by: Ralph Sanchez; Gary Greenfield
- Directed by: Bill Hutten; Tony Love
- Voices of: Tara Charendoff; Len Carlson; Don Francks; Keith Knight; Jonathan Potts; Susan Roman; Norman Spencer; John Stocker
- Theme music composer: John Debney
- Countries of origin: United States; Canada
- Original language: English
- No. of series: 1
- No. of episodes: 13

Production
- Executive producers: Joe Ruby; Ken Spears; Fred Silverman; Stacy McLaughlin; Sy Fischer
- Producer: Larry Huber
- Production companies: The Fred Silverman Company; Ruby-Spears Productions; The Sy Fischer Company; Fox Children's Productions

Original release
- Network: Fox Children's Network
- Release: September 15 – December 15, 1990

Piggsburg Pigs! is a Fox Kids animated comedy series from Ruby-Spears Productions, which originally aired in 1990.

This animated series would be last work of Fred Silverman in animation business as he went to produce various live-action series.

== Plot ==
Located behind the world's largest pig farm, the city of Piggsburg is a pig-only habitat. Here, the Bacon Brothers: Bo, Portley, and Pighead as well as their pet duck Quackers fight the evil plans of the hungry, carnivorous Wolf brothers Huff and Puff as well as the supernatural forces from the Forbidden Zone outside of Piggsburg. Other pig buddies of the Bacon Brothers include Dotty, Lorelei, the children Piggy, Pokey, and Prissy, and the snobby Rembrandt Proudpork. When not fighting off evil plots, the boys unwind at nearby Newpork Beach.

== Episodes ==
No.	Title	Written by	Original release date
1	"Mummies from Outer Space"	Gary Greenfield & Ralph Sanchez	September 15, 1990
As a gala called the Pig Sty Slop Hop is near, a race of mummy-like creatures from another planet crash into the Forbidden Zone where they cause havoc in Piggsburg.
2	"Mystery of the Swamp Mansion"	Rowby Goren	September 22, 1990
3	"Curse of the Ancient Skull"	Ted Pedersen (story); Michael Allen (teleplay)	September 29, 1990
4	"Pighead's Brain"	Gary Greenfield & Cliff Roberts	October 6, 1990
5	"Pigs on the Lam!"	Gary Greenfield & Cliff Roberts	October 13, 1990
6	"Vampire Dogs from Mars"	Richard Merwin	October 20, 1990
7	"Creatures"	Gary Greenfield & Cliff Roberts (story); Michael Allen (teleplay)	October 27, 1990
Two small furry monsters (greatly resembling the ones from the film Critters) are adopted by Portly and Pighead as pets. The pigs are unaware the monsters are planning to hatch their brood and destroy Piggsburg.
8	"Carnival of Evil"	Douglas Booth	November 3, 1990
The monstrous owner of the Carnival of Night uses his powers to turn all of Piggsburg's law enforcement into powerless forms in a plan to get every monster in the Forbidden Zone to invade the town.
9	"Case of the Troublesome Monster"	Gary Greenfield & Cliff Roberts	November 10, 1990
A benign monster accidentally discovers the magic words to animate a giant gargoyle statue and approaches the Bacon brothers to be his bodyguards when a pair of gargoyles who want the statue's power for themselves hunt him down to learn the secret.
10	"Day of the Creeping Fog"	Unknown	November 17, 1990
11	"Nightmare Wish"	Unknown	December 1, 1990
12	"Raid on the Forbidden Zone"	Unknown	December 8, 1990
13	"A Beast for Rembrandt"	Gary Greenfield & Cliff Roberts	December 15, 1990

== Cast ==
- Len Carlson as Rembrandt Proudpork
- Tara Charendoff as Dotty, Prissy
- Keith Knight as Portley Bacon
- Jonathan Potts as Bo Bacon
- Susan Roman as Lorelei
- Norm Spencer as Puff
- John Stocker as Huff

=== Additional ===
- Harvey Atkin
- Robert Bockstael
- Robert Cait
- Don Francks
- Catherine Gallant
- Rex Hagon
- Elizabeth Hanna
- Dan Hennessey - Police Officer (in "Carnival of Evil")
- David Huband
- Gordon Masten
- Ron Rubin
- Greg Spottiswood
- Allen Stewart Coates
- Peter Wildman

== Crew ==
- Stu Rosen - Voice Director, Sound Design
- Butch Hartman - Key Model Designer

== Home releases ==
The series has not been released on VHS or DVD in the United States, but a set of 3 DVDs containing 2 episodes each was released by Boulevard Entertainment in the United Kingdom in 2007.
