= Rubik, the Amazing Cube =

American animated television series

- Genre: Adventure
- Directed by: John Kimball; Rudy Larriva; Norman McCabe
- Voices of: Ron Palillo; Michael Saucedo; Jennifer Fajardo; Michael Bell; Ángela Moya
- Theme music composer: Dean Elliott
- Opening theme: Menudo
- Country of origin: United States
- Original language: English
- No. of series: 1
- No. of episodes: 12

Production
- Executive producers: Joe Ruby; Ken Spears
- Producers: Mark Jones; Steven Werner
- Running time: 30 minutes
- Production company: Ruby-Spears Enterprises

Original release
- Network: ABC
- Release: September 17 – December 3, 1983

Rubik, the Amazing Cube is a 1983 half-hour American Saturday morning animated series based on the puzzle created by Ernő Rubik, produced by Ruby-Spears Enterprises and broadcast as part of the Pac-Man/Rubik, the Amazing Cube Hour block on ABC from September 10 to December 10, 1983 and continued in reruns until September 1, 1984. The Rubik half hour was broadcast in reruns as a standalone series on ABC from May 4 to August 31, 1985.

The program features a magic Rubik's Cube named Rubik who can fly through the air and has other special powers. Rubik can only come alive when he is in a solved state. The voice of Rubik, Ron Palillo, told TV Guide in 1983 that for the role, he spoke very slowly and then technicians sped up the tapes and raised the pitch in an Alvin and the Chipmunks–esque manner. Palillo said Rubik's giggle was different from the trademark laugh of Horshack, his character on the TV series Welcome Back, Kotter, and that it was pretty "for an inanimate object". It was also one of the first American animated series to feature a mainly Hispanic and Latino American roster of characters, along with voice actors.

== Premise ==
Rubik falls out of the stagecoach of an evil magician, who later becomes the main villain of the series. Rubik helps Carlos, Lisa, and Reynaldo Rodriguez in foiling the magician’s attempts to recover him.

Some episodes also deal with more normal adversaries, such as a bully trying to thwart Reynaldo's efforts to impress a girl.

For dramatic purposes, Rubik often gets easily fully scrambled, such as by being dropped or grabbed by the family dog. The puzzle is usually solved quickly by the Rodriguez children, although in stressful circumstances it takes them longer. When scrambled, Rubik can only be heard speaking gibberish and can sometimes be heard saying, "Help".

== Cast ==
- Ron Palillo as Rubik
- Michael Bell as Reynaldo Rodriguez
- Jennifer Fajardo as Lisa Rodriguez
- Michael Saucedo as Carlos Rodriguez
- Angela Moya as Marla

Additional voices: Jack DeLeon, Alan Dinehart, Laurie Faso, Takayo Fischer, Bob Holt, Tress MacNeille, Tysun McMullan, Neil Ross, John Stephenson, Janet Waldo, Alan Young

== Theme song ==
Tying into the human characters being Hispanic Americans, the theme song was sung by Puerto Rican boy band Menudo. Featured in the song were Johnny Lozada, Ricky Melendez, Charlie Masso, Ray Reyes, Raul Reyes, Robby Rosa, and Roy Rossello.

== Episodes ==
No.	Title	Story by	Original release date
1	"Meet Rubik"	Mark Jones	September 17, 1983
2	"Back Packin' Rubik"	Mark Jones	September 24, 1983
3	"Rubik and the Buried Treasure"	Janis Diamond	October 1, 1983
4	"Rubik and the Lucky Helmet"	Tom Dagenais	October 8, 1983
5	"Rubik and the Mysterious Man"	Unknown	October 15, 1983
6	"Rubik and the Pooch Nappers"	Norman Maurer	October 22, 1983
7	"Rubik and the Science Fair"	Unknown	October 29, 1983
8	"Rubik in Wonderland"	Mark Jones, Janis Diamond, Jack Enyart & Gordon Kent	November 5, 1983
9	"Honolulu Rubik"	Mark Jones	November 12, 1983
10	"Rubik's First Christmas"	Mark Jones & Janis Diamond	November 19, 1983
11	"Saturday Night Rubik"	Rick Merwin & Gary Greenfield	November 26, 1983
12	"Super Power Lisa"	Tom Dagenais	December 3, 1983

== Broadcast ==
The series premiered on ABC on September 10, 1983 and was paired with Hanna-Barbera's Pac-Man under the title of The Pac-Man/Rubik, the Amazing Cube Hour and ran until September 1, 1984. ABC rebroadcast the series from April 4 to August 31, 1985, independent of Pac-Man.
