= Harvey Eisenberg =

American animator and comic book artist (1911–1965)

- Born: February 11, 1912; New York City, U.S.
- Died: April 22, 1965 (aged 53); Los Angeles, California, U.S.
- Occupations: Comic book artist; animator
- Years active: 1938–1965
- Children: Jerry Eisenberg

Harvey Eisenberg (February 11, 1912 – April 22, 1965) was an American animator and comic book artist. Best known for his work with William Hanna and Joseph Barbera at the Metro-Goldwyn-Mayer cartoon department and later at their own Hanna-Barbera Productions, Eisenberg illustrated a large number of comic book stories and comic strips starring characters such as Tom and Jerry, Yogi Bear, and The Flintstones, while also working as an animation layout artist and character designer on the cartoons themselves.

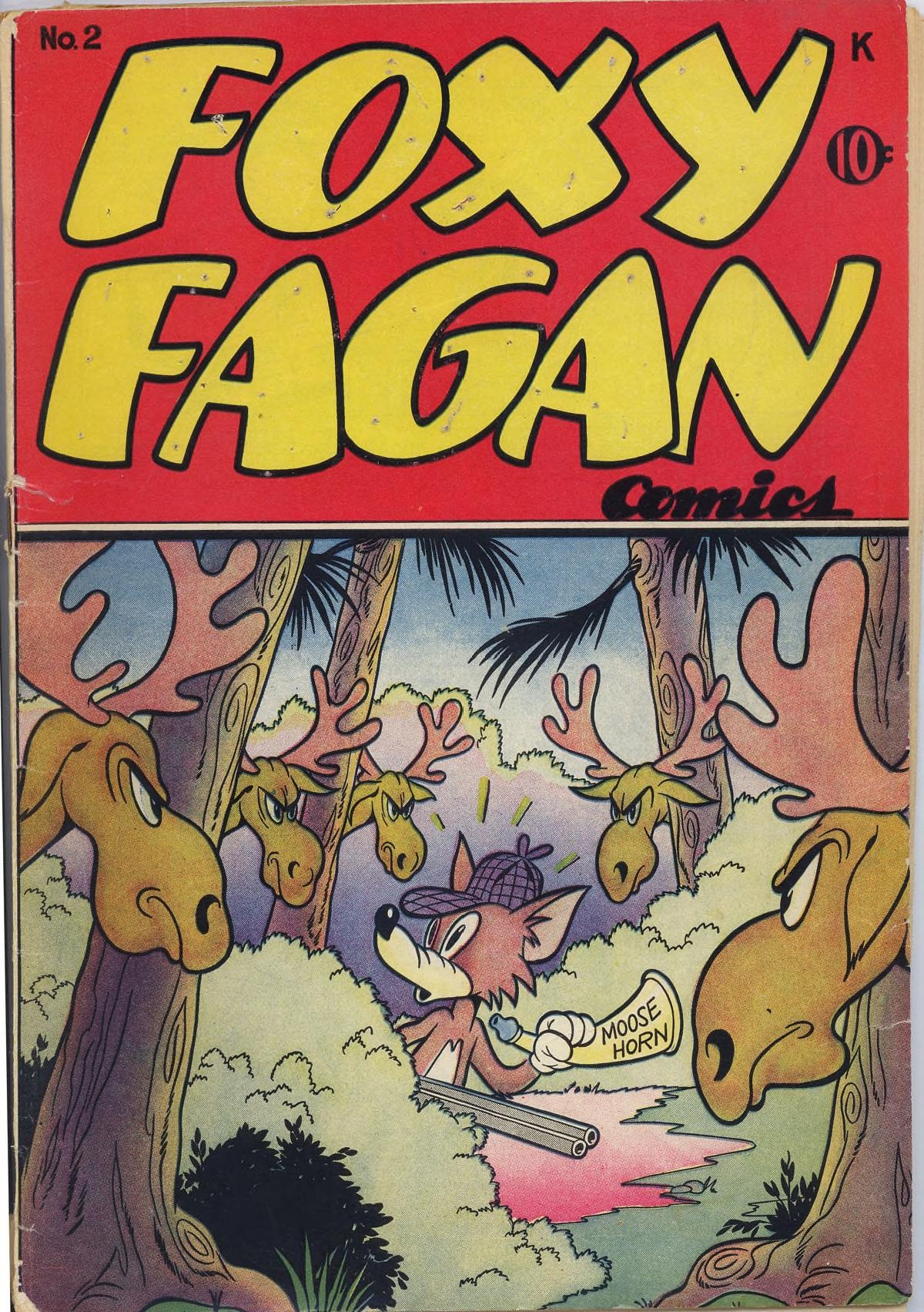
Foxy Fagan #2, February 1947, art by Harvey Eisenberg

Eisenberg was a native of Brooklyn, New York City, New York of German descent, where as an adult he met another cartoonist, Joseph Barbera. Barbera later got Eisenberg a job at the MGM cartoon department in the late 1930s, where Eisenberg worked in Barbera and William Hanna's unit doing layouts for Tom and Jerry cartoons from 1941 to 1945. From 1946 to 1951, Eisenberg and Barbera were partners in Dearfield Publishing, a comic book company with titles such as "Red" Rabbit Comics, Foxy Fagan, and Junie Prom.

Eisenberg went into comic book illustration full-time from the late 1940s on, and illustrated many issues of Tom and Jerry and later Hanna-Barbera related comic books and children's books. His prolific career as an illustrator of Hanna-Barbera comics has drawn comparison to the work Carl Barks did for Walt Disney Productions.

Eisenberg's son Jerry Eisenberg became a storyboard artist, layout artist, and character designer for Hanna-Barbera in the late 1950s, and later also worked for Ruby-Spears Productions as well. Following a series of heart attacks, Harvey Eisenberg died on April 22, 1965.
