= Barbara Brooks Wallace =

American novelist (1922–2018)

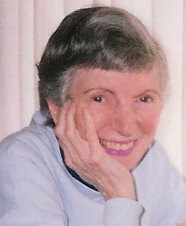
- Born: December 3, 1922; Suzhou, China
- Died: November 27, 2018 (aged 95); Arlington, Virginia, U.S.
- Education: University of California, Los Angeles
- Occupations: Writer, poet
- Writing career
- Years active: 1975–2012
- Genre: Children's literature
- Notable works: Peppermints in the Parlor (1983); The Twin in the Tavern (1994); Claudia (2001)
- Notable awards: Edgar Award (1994, 1998)

Barbara Brooks Wallace (December 3, 1922 – November 27, 2018) was an American children's writer. She won the NLAPW Children's Book Award and International Youth Library "Best of the Best" for Claudia (2001) and William Allen White Children's Book Award for Peppermints in the Parlor (1983).

== Early life ==
Wallace was born and spent her childhood in China, where she attended Shanghai American School, but came to live in the United States during high school. San Francisco was a port of entry for the family many times. She graduated from UCLA where she was a member of the Alpha Phi sorority.

== Career ==
Wallace won Edgar Awards from the Mystery Writers of America for both The Twin in the Tavern (1994) and Sparrows in the Scullery (1998). Cousins in The Castle (1997) and Ghosts in the Gallery (2001) were also nominated for the Edgar Award.

Wallace's books are often compared to Lemony Snicket, as well as books by Joan Lowery Nixon and Beverly Cleary. Wallace has also received high praise from the American Library Association.

In 2009, Wallace tapped the creative development group Pangea Corporation to develop her series of books into animated and live action entertainment. Her Miss Switch series had previously enjoyed popular installments on ABC Weekend Special, garnering the high Nielsen ratings. Wallace's Hawkins books were also featured as live action films on ABC Weekend Special.

Wallace's novel Diary of a Little Devil was published as a digital eBook in September 2011. The deal was the result of Pangea's efforts and culminates with additional books to be released in the same manner, including a new installment to the Miss Switch series: Miss Switch and the Vile Villains.

== Death ==
Wallace died November 27, 2018, in Arlington, Virginia, from complications of pneumonia at the age of 95.

== Books ==
- Secret in St. Something
- Peppermints in the Parlor
- The Perils of Peppermints
- The Barrel in the Basement
- The Interesting Thing That Happened At Perfect Acres, Inc.
- Hello Claudia!
- Claudia
- Claudia and Duffy
- Victoria
- Can Do, Missy Charlie
- The Secret Summer of L.E.B.
- Andrew the Big Deal
- Julia and the Third Bad Thing
- Palmer Patch
- The Hawkins Series
- Miss Switch Online
- Miss Switch to the Rescue
- The Trouble with Miss Switch
- Argyle
- Ghosts in the Gallery
- Cousins in the Castle
- Miss Switch's Bathsheba & The Cat Caper (co-authored with John C. Besmehn)
