= Jerry Eisenberg =

American animator (1937–2025)

- Born: December 3, 1937; New York City, U.S.
- Died: February 11, 2025 (aged 87); Los Angeles, California, U.S.
- Education: Chouinard Art Institute
- Occupations: Animator; storyboard artist; character designer
- Years active: 1956–2025
- Employer(s): Hanna-Barbera (1961–2001); Ruby-Spears Productions (1977–1996)
- Father: Harvey Eisenberg

Jerry Eisenberg (December 3, 1937 – February 11, 2025) was an American television producer, animator, storyboard artist, and character designer, primarily known for his work at Hanna-Barbera Productions and Ruby-Spears Productions.

== Early life ==
Eisenberg was born in New York City on December 3, 1937. He was the son of Harvey Eisenberg, an animator and comic book artist associated with Tom and Jerry and the other characters from the MGM cartoon studio. They were of German descent.

After graduating Hamilton High School, Eisenberg attended Chouinard Art Institute on scholarship. In 1956, Jerry quit art school to take his first job, as an inbetweener for MGM. The studio closed seven months after Eisenberg's hire, and he went on to work as an assistant to Ken Harris at Warner Bros. Cartoons.

== Career ==
In 1961, Eisenberg was hired at Hanna-Barbera Productions, run by former MGM cartoon producers William Hanna and Joseph Barbera. Here, Eisenberg co-created The Peter Potamus Show; designed the characters on Wacky Races and Super Friends; and worked in layout on programs such as The Jetsons, The Huckleberry Hound Show, Jonny Quest and Wacky Races (along with spin-offs The Perils of Penelope Pitstop and Dastardly and Muttley in Their Flying Machines). In 1977, Hanna-Barbera alumni Joe Ruby and Ken Spears started their own studio, Ruby-Spears Productions, and hired Eisenberg as producer and character designer for Fangface, The Plastic Man Comedy/Adventure Show and Thundarr the Barbarian.

Eisenberg later worked as a writer, storyboard artist, and/or designer and layout artist for a number of productions at various studios, including Muppet Babies at Marvel Productions, Histeria! at Warner Bros. Animation, House of Mouse at Walt Disney Television Animation and Dilbert (Idbox/Columbia TriStar Television). He had also worked on several productions for Hanna-Barbera and its successor, Warner Bros. Animation, including Johnny Bravo, Tom & Jerry Kids and a number of Scooby-Doo direct-to-video films until his death on February 11, 2025.

Eisenberg died in Tarzana, California on February 11, 2025, at the age of 87.

At the 97th Academy Awards, his name was mentioned in the In Memoriam section.
