= Four Star Playhouse (radio program) =

1949 radio dramatic anthology series

- Genre: Dramatic anthology
- Running time: 30 minutes
- Country of origin: United States
- Language: English
- Syndicates: NBC
- TV adaptations: Four Star Playhouse
- Starring: Fred MacMurray; Loretta Young; Rosalind Russell; Robert Cummings
- Written by: Milton Geiger
- Original release: July 3 – September 18, 1949
- No. of episodes: 12

Four Star Playhouse was an old time radio dramatic anthology series. The 30-minute program was broadcast on NBC beginning in July 1949 and was sustaining. It lasted only three months.

Four Star Playhouse was one of "at least 10" new programs developed for that summer by NBC's [West] Coast programming department. A story in the July 2, 1949, issue of The Billboard reported that NBC "is now keyed to the recent programming drive, launched to offset Columbia Broadcasting System's (CBS) talent raids, and is anxious to use summer hiatus periods to develop shows worthy of fall bankrolling. Hence, the new raft of airers will not be treated as fill-in shows, but produced with an eye to long-term web tenancy." The trade publication Variety called Four Star Playhouse "NBC's answer to CBS' Family Hour of Stars".

Radio historian John Dunning put the production surge in context:

The Four Star Playhouse was a 1949 NBC effort ... quickly put together as part of the network's barrage against CBS. During the previous summer, CBS had raided the top of NBC's comedy line, luring Jack Benny, Amos 'n' Andy, and others into a network jump. NBC's reaction was almost frantic: a battery of new shows like this one, featuring glamor and lots of big names.

Other NBC shows developed as a part of that effort included Hollywood Calling, Screen Directors Playhouse, Dragnet, Richard Diamond and The Trouble with the Truitts.

Despite the star power of the show's four featured artists, Dunning noted, "the new NBC lineup just couldn't compete against the old, which CBS stacked into the same time slots on Sunday. Most of the new shows vanished from the air within months, and the Four Star Playhouse was one of them." Three years after Four Star Playhouse's demise on radio, the same format was used -- with different stars -- for a TV version that ran for four years. See Four Star Playhouse.

== Format and Cast ==
The show's title came from the fact that it was built around "four major film stars, each of whom was featured in turn in the weekly presentations." They were Fred MacMurray, Loretta Young, Rosalind Russell and Robert Cummings. As an anthology series, Four Star Playhouse did not have a standard cast. However, many radio actors and actresses of that time appeared in episodes. They included Elliot Lewis, Shirley Mitchell, Paul Frees, Ross Taylor, Will Wright, Lurene Tuttle, William Conrad, Wilms Herbert, Lawrence Dobkin, Betty Moran, Frank Lovejoy, George Neise, Janet Waldo, Jeanne Bates, Joe DuVal, Willard Waterman, Jack Edwards, Mary Jane Croft, Frank Nelson, Charles Seel, Herb Butterfield, Jeff Chandler, Shepard Menken, Dan O'Herlihy and Ken Christy. Frank Barton was the announcer. Episodes were adapted by writer Milton Geiger from short stories in Cosmopolitan magazine.

== Episodes ==
The series' entire run consisted of 12 episodes. Their dates, titles and stars were as follows:

Date	Title	Star
July 3, 1949	Welcome to Our City	Rosalind Russell
July 10, 1949	Another Day, Another Dollar Ninety-Eight	Fred MacMurray
July 17, 1949	A Legend for Spring Brides	Loretta Young
July 24, 1949	Third Girl From The Right	Robert Cummings
July 31, 1949	From an Admirer	Rosalind Russell
August 7, 1949	The Life and Death of George Wilson	Fred MacMurray
August 14, 1949	The Hunted	Robert Cummings
August 21, 1949	The Incredible Anna Lee	Rosalind Russell
August 28, 1949	Cory	Fred MacMurray
September 4, 1949	Surprise For The Professor	Robert Cummings
September 11, 1949	Paradise U S A	Rosalind Russell
September 18, 1949	Once Upon a Horse	Loretta Young
