= Eric Taslitz =

American actor (born 1966)

- Born: June 14, 1966 (age 60); Whittier, California, United States
- Occupation: Actor

Eric Taslitz is an American actor best known for roles in such films and television series as American Pop, Galactica 1980, and Lambada.

== Filmography ==
Year	Title	Role	Notes
1979	ABC Weekend Specials	Simon	Episode - "The Ghost of Thomas Kempe"
1979	The Rockford Files	School Boy	Episode - "Just a Coupla Guys"
1980	ABC Weekend Specials	Rupert Brown (voice)	Episode - "The Trouble with Miss Switch"
1980	Galactica 1980	Jason / Super Scout	4 episodes
1980	Scout's Honor	Grogan	TV movie
1980	Bizarre	Various roles	Unknown episodes
1980	Little House on the Prairie	Timothy	Episode - "Divorce, Walnut Grove Style"
1981	American Pop	Little Pete	
1981	Conquest of the Earth	Super Scout	TV movie
1982	ABC Weekend Specials	Rupert Brown (voice)	Episode - "Miss Switch to the Rescue"
1982	ABC Afterschool Specials	Arthur	Episode - "Daddy, I'm Their Mama Now"
1982	Quincy, M.E.	Boy Who Clean off Swastika	Episode - "Stolen Tears"
1990	Lambada	Egghead	
1990	Uncle Buck	Louis	Episode - "Teacher's Pet"
1993	Midnight Witness	Gas Station Attendant	
