= Fangface =

American animated television series

- Genre: Adventure; Comedy horror Mystery
- Created by: Joe Ruby; Ken Spears
- Written by: Norman Maurer; Mark Jones; Cliff Ruby; Elana Lesser
- Directed by: Rudy Larriva
- Voices of: Frank Welker; Bart Braverman; Susan Blu; Jerry Dexter
- Narrated by: John Stephenson (opening narration)
- Country of origin: United States
- Original language: English
- No. of seasons: 2
- No. of episodes: 24 (32 segments)

Production
- Executive producers: Joe Ruby; Ken Spears
- Producer: Jerry Eisenberg
- Running time: 30 minutes
- Production company: Ruby-Spears Productions

Original release
- Network: ABC
- Release: September 9, 1978 – November 10, 1979

Fangface is an American Saturday morning cartoon produced by Ruby-Spears Productions for ABC. It premiered on September 9, 1978 and ended on November 10, 1979, with a total of 24 episodes over the course of 2 seasons. The executive producers were Joe Ruby and Ken Spears.

== Overview ==
Highly derivative of Scooby-Doo with elements from the Tasmanian Devil and I Was a Teenage Werewolf as well, Fangface features four teenagers — buff and handsome leader Biff, his brainy girlfriend Kim, short, stocky and pugnacious Puggsy and tall, skinny simpleton Sherman "Fangs" Fangsworth, who transforms into the werewolf Fangface when he sees the moon or even a picture of the moon. Puggsy and Fangs are based on Leo Gorcey and Huntz Hall of the Bowery Boys films.

== Opening narration ==
The opening title narration, provided by John Stephenson, consists of the following:

Every 400 years, a baby werewolf is born into the Fangsworth family, and so when the moon shined on little Sherman Fangsworth, he changed into Fangface, a werewolf! Only the sun can change him back to normal, and so little Fangs grew up and teamed up with three daring teenagers—Kim, Biff and Puggsy—and together they find danger, excitement and adventure. Who can save the day, who can wrong the rights and right the wrongs .... none other than Fangface!

== Fangface and Fangpuss ==
In 1979, the second season, titled Fangface and Fangpuss, aired as a segment on The Plastic Man Comedy/Adventure Show and introduced a new character: Baby Fangs, Fangs' infant cousin who turns into a baby werewolf called Fangpuss. This updated the show's canon that only one werewolf is born into the family every 400 years by adding that a werewolf could be born through another family which may be married to the Fangsworth family.

The show remained in the same mystery-adventure style as the first season, but episodes were now shortened to two 15-minute segments in one 30-minute episode. Eight episodes of Fangface and Fangpuss were produced for the 1979 season.

The episodes "The Creepy Goon from the Spooky Lagoon" and "Dr. Lupiter and the Thing from Jupiter" are the only season two episodes in which Baby Fangs/Fangpuss did not make an appearance.

Just as Fangs is unaware that he is Fangface, Fangs is also unaware that his cousin, Baby Fangs, is Fangpuss. When Fangs sees Fangpuss, in the episode "There Is Nothing Worse Than a Stony Curse", he becomes scared and runs off.

During Season 2, the characters Fangface and Fangpuss never transform back to normal before the episode's mystery is solved.

Fangface and Fangpuss originally aired from September 22, 1979, to November 10, 1979; it then became a separate series in 1981 and, like the original Fangface, ran for just one season. Later, in 1983, Puggsy and Fangface had cameos in The Puppy's Further Adventures episode "Puppy and the Spies", when the dogs are watching an episode of Fangface on TV.

== Cast ==
- Frank Welker as Sherman "Fangs" Fangsworth/Fangface, Baby Fangs/Fangpuss
- Susan Blu as Kim Carlton
- Bart Braverman as Puggsy Colmare
- Jerry Dexter as Biff Sutcliffe

=== Additional voices ===
- Lewis Bailey
- Ted Cassidy
- Henry Corden as Abdul the Giant
- Joan Gerber
- Hettie Lynn Hurtes
- Larry D. Mann
- Allan Melvin
- Alan Oppenheimer as Vulture-Man, Disastro
- Michael Rye as Dr. Lazarus Web, Skullman, Mysto the Magician
- John Stephenson as Main Title Narrator, Ironmask, Zorak

== Episodes ==
Season	Episodes	Originally released	
Season	Episodes	First released	Last released
1	16	September 9, 1978	December 23, 1978
2	8	September 22, 1979	November 10, 1979

=== Season 1 (1978) ===
No. overall	No. in season	Title	Original release date
1	1	"A Heap of Trouble"	September 9, 1978
Professor Arnos uses his invention to change into a hulking blue Heap creature and plans on changing everyone on the university's campus into monsters for revenge.
2	2	"A Creep from the Deep"	September 16, 1978
Grueller and his men steal an ancient tablet that will lead them to lost treasure, defying the consequences of its curse.
3	3	"The Shocking Creature Feature"	September 23, 1978
Dr. Cybron, an evil scientist, plans to create numerous energy creatures and use them in his plot to take over the world.
4	4	"Westward Ho to the UFO"	September 30, 1978
A race of spider creatures from space cover the city in webs, trying to take over the world.
5	5	"The Great Ape Escape"	October 7, 1978
Professor Ling is captured by Ape Creatures on the Misty Islands, and it's up to the gang to rescue him.
6	6	"Dinosaur Daze"	October 14, 1978
A live Tyrannosaurus breaks the surface during an earthquake and is being controlled by a mysterious figure. Fangface must stop it before it causes damage to the city.
7	7	"Don't Abra When You Cadabra"	October 21, 1978
Mysto the Magician creates a super wand that can bend buildings over sideways, and with it, he plans to take over the world.
8	8	"Space Monster Mishap"	October 28, 1978
A Space Monster gains entry into a space station and uses a device to drain the minds of the most brilliant scientists.
9	9	"The Invisible Menace Mix-up"	November 4, 1978
The Sky Ghost kidnaps airplane daredevil Su Chang in order to get information on where her uncle hid a valuable black pearl, the only thing that can power his invisibility machine.
10	10	"The Cuckoo Carnival Calamity"	November 11, 1978
The evil swami Zorak uses a control device to turn Harold "Hal" Hercules into a monster in order to get the world's strongest teenager to help him steal gold.
11	11	"Begone, You Amazon"	November 18, 1978
During a storm, the gang land in the Amazon jungle where Fangface rescues Sheba, an Amazon queen. Fangface and his friends must help her reclaim her throne from her evil cousin Thera.
12	12	"Snow Job Jitters"	November 25, 1978
The gang's ski-trip turns into a delivery when they help take Charlie (a cat with a formula on how to make synthetic gold hidden on him) to a laboratory while trying to avoid a villain named the Scorpion.
13	13	"The Goofy Gargoyle Goof-Up"	December 2, 1978
The gang go to a Hollywood costume party, where they meet the glamorous Raquel Taylor. Unfortunately, Crula plans on making the actress a bride for her gargoyle.
14	14	"A Toothy Shark Is No Lark"	December 9, 1978
Neptune, a sea-creature from Atlantis, uses a device to control a shark in order to enslave humanity into building him a new empire.
15	15	"Where's the Wolf That's the Werewolf?"	December 16, 1978
A werewolf is stealing the animals in the Jungleland Animal Safari and Fangface is to blame. What they do not know is that a staff member named Zorlaff is stealing the animals using a special potion in order to create a potion that will turn him into different animals.
16	16	"Don't Get Mean with the Cobra Queen"	December 23, 1978
Cobra Queen sends her giant cobra to abduct Gloria Vanderfeller in order to claim her fortune.

=== Season 2: Fangface and Fangpuss (1979) ===
No. overall	No. in season	Title	Original release date
17	1	"There Is Nothing Worse Than a Stony Curse/Evil Guider of the Giant Spider"	September 22, 1979
There Is Nothing Worse Than a Stony Curse: The evil Medulla possesses an amulet that gives her the appearance and powers of Medusa. She uses her powers to turn the top scientists to stone and auction them off to the highest bidder. Evil Guider of the Giant Spider: Upon crashing onto Spider Island and an encounter with a giant spider, the group ends up stumbling upon the lab of Dr. Lazarus Web who plans to use a formula to enlarge the insects and take over the world.
18	2	"Dr. Lupiter and the Thing from Jupiter/Who Do the Voodo"	September 29, 1979
Dr. Lupiter and the Thing from Jupiter: When astronaut Steve West lands on Jupiter, Dr. Lupiter opens a trap door in the shuttle where the gases of Jupiter turn Steve into a molten monster in a plan to tap the Earth's energy supply. Who Do the Voodo: Nigel Winslow helps Count Drako escape from prison by using black magic to change Count Drako into a mist monster.
19	3	"The Creepy Goon from the Spooky Lagoon/A Scary Affair in the Skullman's Lair"	October 6, 1979
The Creepy Goon from the Spooky Lagoon: Dr. Vincent Blackmire has invented a machine that can transfer the contents of one's brain to another. The results end up different when he switches the brain contents of a Lagoon Monster with Fangface. A Scary Affair in the Skullman's Lair: A race of Skullmen have kidnapped Professor Ortega and his daughter Carmen. They have also shrunken them in a plot to enter a crack in the Earth and retrieve a Skull Coin containing the superpowers of the Skullmen's ancestors.
20	4	"A Time-Machine Trip to the Pirate's Ship/The Ill-Will of Dr. Chill"	October 13, 1979
A Time Machine Trip to the Pirate's Ship: The gang are transported in time where they stumble upon pirates led by Ironmask who has plans to rob a Spanish ship. The Ill-Will of Dr. Chill: Dr. Chill uses a heat ray to melt the polar ice caps. He plans to flood the Earth if his demands are not met.
21	5	"The Romantic Plot of the She-Wolf Robot/The Sinister Plan of Lizard Man"	October 20, 1979
The Romantic Plot of the She-Wolf Robot: Countess Zarla creates a robotic female werewolf to seduce Fangface into helping her steal the Maltese Diamond Cat from its museum. The Sinister Plan of Lizard Man: Lizard Man uses a ray that turns his victims into small reptiles. He uses the device to steal a meteor that will give him enough super-strength to rule the world.
22	6	"Royal Trouble with the King's Double/The Stone-Cold Dragon of Gold"	October 27, 1979
Royal Trouble with the King's Double: Count Basil kidnaps King Rudolph to prevent his coronation. Seeing as Puggsy resembles the king, he takes his place while the others rescue the real king. The Stone-Cold Dragon of Gold: A golden dragon statue lies within Hong Kong with the power to turn anyone into solid gold.
23	7	"The Evil Design of Vulture-Man's Mind/The Defiant Casablanca Giant"	November 3, 1979
The Evil Design of Vulture-Man's Mind: Vulture-Man is abducting Peruvian natives with his giant condor and is making them his slaves to mine for the precious metals located in Vulture Mountain. The Defiant Casablanca Giant: Abdul the Giant captures a nuclear physicist named Zatci Hafid and plans to sell him to aliens in exchange for diamonds.
24	8	"The Film Fiasco of Director Disastro/A Goofy Bungle in the Filipino Jungle"	November 10, 1979
The Film Fiasco of Director Disastro: Disastro is an alien film director who plans to make a movie called "The Day the Earth Exploded" with special effects that are too real. A Goofy Bungle in the Filipino Jungle: On the Philippine Islands, a tribe of Filipino Cavemen have been discovered by Zeno who uses his ring to hypnotize them into stealing Professor Batack's invention which can make a man 100 times stronger than normal.

== Merchandising ==
- A Parker Brothers board game, titled as "FANGFACE – Parker Brothers' Wacky Werewolf Game", was released in 1979.
- Peter Pan Records released a Fangface 12-inch LP record in 1979, containing four audio stories (Side 1: Mirage / Ghost of the High Sierras; Side 2: The Stowaway / Superfrog).
- Other merchandise included an activity book, a 3D View-Master reel set, a plush toy, a Halloween costume and a sleeping bag.
- Tempo Books released two Fangface paperback books based on episodes of the series: A Heap of Trouble (1979) and A Time Machine Trip to the Pirate's Ship (1980).

== Home media ==
- Three episodes of the series, "A Heap of Trouble", "The Great Ape Escape", and "A Creep from the Deep", were released on VHS by Worldvision Home Video in 1983.
- A second VHS tape, Fangface: Spooky Spoofs, was released in 1986 and contained the episodes "The Shocking Creature Feature" and "Dinosaur Daze".
- Fangface season one was released remastered on Apple TV on August 22, 2022.

== In other media ==
Fangface appears in the third season episode of Jellystone! titled "Heavens to Murgatroyd". In Jabberjaw's titular story, Fangface appears as the werewolf form of stable boy El Kabong.
