= Janet Waldo =

American actress (1919–2016)

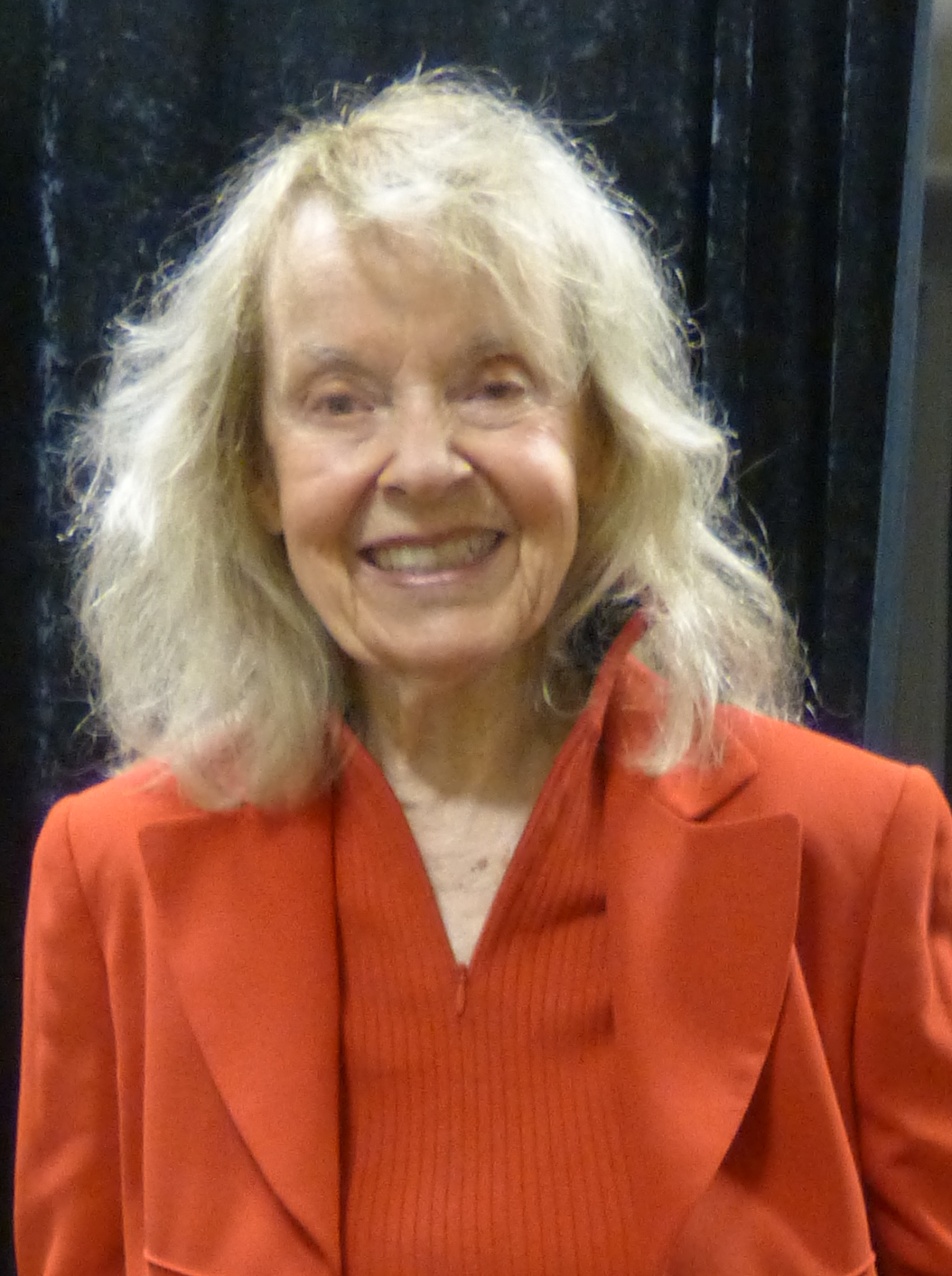
- Waldo in 2013
- Born: Patricia Waldo; February 4, 1919; Grandview, Washington, U.S.
- Died: June 12, 2016 (aged 97); Los Angeles, California, U.S.
- Resting place: Forest Lawn Memorial Park, U.S.
- Occupations: Actress, voice artist
- Years active: 1938–2013
- Spouse: Robert E. Lee (m. 1948; died 1994)
- Children: 2
- Relatives: Elisabeth Waldo (sister)

Janet Waldo (born Patricia Waldo; February 4, 1919 – June 12, 2016) was an American radio and voice actress. In animation, she voiced Judy Jetson in various Hanna-Barbera media, Nancy in Shazzan, Penelope Pitstop, Princess from Battle of the Planets, and Josie in Josie and the Pussycats. On radio, she was the title character in Meet Corliss Archer.

== Early life ==
Waldo was born Patricia Waldo (according to her birth certificate but soon was called "Janet") in Grandview, Yakima County, Washington, the youngest of four siblings. Her mother, Jane Althea Blodgett, was a singer trained at the Boston Conservatory of Music, and her father, Benjamin Franklin Waldo, was, according to Waldo family lore, a distant cousin of Ralph Waldo Emerson. Waldo attended the University of Washington, where her performance in a student theatrical garnered her an award and brought her to the attention of Bing Crosby. She had three older siblings: Benjamin Franklin Waldo Jr., Virginia Waldo, and Elisabeth Dentzel (née Waldo).

== Career ==
=== Radio, film and television ===
Al Feldstein, later the editor of Mad, was a writer-illustrator of the Meet Corliss Archer comic book. Waldo was depicted on the front cover twice, as herself and as Corliss.

Waldo appeared in several films in uncredited bit parts and small roles, although she was the leading lady in three Westerns, two of them starring Tim Holt. Her big break came in radio with a part on Cecil B. DeMille's Lux Radio Theater. In her radio career, she lent her voice to many programs, including Edward G. Robinson's Big Town, The Eddie Bracken Show, Favorite Story, Four Star Playhouse, The Gallant Heart, One Man's Family, Sears Radio Theater, and Stars over Hollywood.

In 1948, the Meet Corliss Archer comic book, using Waldo's likeness, published by Fox Feature Syndicate, appeared for a run of three issues from March to July 1948, using the original scripts. She co-starred with Jimmy Lydon in the CBS situation comedy Young Love (1949–50), and she had recurring roles on The Adventures of Ozzie and Harriet (as teenager Emmy Lou), The Red Skelton Show, and People Are Funny. She recorded with jazz vocalist Mel Torme and his vocal group the Mel-Tones. Her eight-year run starring as teenager Corliss Archer on CBS's Meet Corliss Archer left a lasting impression, though Shirley Temple starred in the film adaptations, Kiss and Tell and A Kiss for Corliss. The radio program was the CBS answer to NBC's popular A Date with Judy. Despite the long run of Meet Corliss Archer, fewer than 24 episodes are known to exist. Waldo appeared as Peggy, a young woman smitten with Ricky Ricardo on a 1952 episode of I Love Lucy titled "The Young Fans" with Richard Crenna. Ten years later, she worked with Lucille Ball, this time playing Lucy Carmichael's sister, Marge, on The Lucy Show (episode "Lucy's Sister Pays A Visit"). She also appeared on an episode of The Andy Griffith Show as Amanda. Later, she was the female lead opposite Anthony Franciosa in the short-lived sitcom Valentine's Day (1964).

=== Animation ===
In television animation, she played Judy Jetson in all versions of the Hanna-Barbera television series The Jetsons. Waldo was the last surviving main cast member of the original The Jetsons series. In 1964–66, she took over the role of Pearl Slaghoople on The Flintstones, which was originally played by Verna Felton. Waldo reprised Mrs. Slaghoople on the Flintstones TV films I Yabba-Dabba Do! and Hollyrock-a-Bye Baby in the 1990s. She later provided the voices for Nancy in Shazzan, Granny Sweet in The Atom Ant/Secret Squirrel Show, Josie in Josie and the Pussycats, and Josie and the Pussycats in Outer Space, and Penelope Pitstop in both Wacky Races and The Perils of Penelope Pitstop. She later guest-starred in Thundarr the Barbarian as Circe in the episode "Island of the Body Snatchers”.

Further guest-starring roles included Beth Crane, a descendant of Ichabod Crane, in the episode "The Headless Horseman of Halloween" from The Scooby-Doo Show in 1976 and as Aggie Wilkins/Witch McCoy in the episode "The Ozark Witch Switch" in 1977. The following year, she voiced both Arlene Wilcox, twin sister of the 'Witch of Salem' and the witch in the episode "To Switch a Witch " from the third season of Scooby Doo, Where Are You! in 1978. She voiced Morticia Addams in the short-lived 1973 cartoon series adaptation of The Addams Family. Waldo was the voice of Princess and Susan in the English-language version of Kagaku ninja tai Gatchaman, known as Battle of the Planets, and Hogatha in The Smurfs.

=== Later career ===
In 1990, shortly after completing her role as Judy Jetson in Jetsons: The Movie, she was abruptly replaced as Judy by pop star Tiffany. The executive decision of Universal Pictures caused casting director Andrea Romano to say it was "a huge mistake on so many levels" and Romano asked that her name be removed from the credits. Romano received volumes of hate mail despite her stance on the casting change. Voice director Gordon Hunt reportedly asked Tiffany to sound more like Waldo. According to Iwao Takamoto by the time of the film's release, Tiffany's fame had waned. He quipped, "The punch line, of course, is that fifteen years after the fact, Janet Waldo is still working while for most people, saying the name Tiffany automatically brings to mind a lamp."

Ultimately, Waldo patched things up with Hanna-Barbera and continued acting on their television series. The movie version of The Jetsons was a box-office disappointment and a critical failure with most of the negative reviews directed at Tiffany's acting and the replacement of the original voice of Judy Jetson.

== Personal life and death ==
Waldo married playwright Robert E. Lee on March 19, 1948. They remained married until his death in 1994. Together they had two children: Jonathan Barlow Lee (born 1952) and Lucy V. Lee (born 1956).

Waldo died on June 12, 2016. She had been diagnosed with a benign but inoperable brain tumor five years before her death.

== Filmography ==
=== Radio ===
Original Air Date	Program	Role	Episode
1941	Big Town	Various characters	
1941–43	The Lux Radio Theatre	Various characters	Multiple radio adaptations
1941–45	One Man's Family	Irene Franklin	
1942, 1946	Dr. Christian	Nurse Judy Price	2 episodes
March 3, 1943; March 31, 1943	Mayor of the Town	Additional voices	
1943–45	Cavalcade of America	Additional voices	
June 29, 1944	The Dinah Shore Program	Various characters	
1944	The Gallant Heart	Jennifer Lake	Series regular
1944	The Charlotte Greenwood Show	Barbara Barton	
1944–45	Lady of the Press – Sandra Martin	Sandra Martin	Series regular
1944–54	The Adventures of Ozzie and Harriet	Emmy Lou	Series regular
1945	Major Bowes' Shower of Stars	Janet	
1945–47	Songs by Sinatra	Teenage Tina	
1945–47	The Eddie Bracken Show	Eddie's girlfriend	Series regular
1945–52	People are Funny	Raleigh Cigarette Girl	Series regular
1946	Request Performance	Janet	"Abbott/Costello"
1946–48	Favorite Story	Various characters	
1946–56	Meet Corliss Archer	Corliss Archer	Series regular
1947	The Fabulous Dr. Tweedy	Mary Potts	Series regular
1947	The Camel Screen Guild Theatre	Girl	"The Secret Heart"
1947	The Great Gildersleeve	Joanne Piper	8 episodes
1948	The Mel Torme Show	Mel's girlfriend	Series regular
1948	Family Theater	Various characters	2 episodes
1949	Screen Directors Playhouse	Katie and Peggy Stephenson	"The Exile" and "The Best Years of Our Lives"
1949	Errand of Mercy	Girl	"Help for a Fighter"
1949	Philco Radio Time	Dennis Day's Date	
1949	Four Star Playhouse	A number of characters	"Corey"
1949–50	Young Love	Janet Shaw-Lewis	Series regular
1950	The Halls of Ivy	Additional voices	
1951	My Favorite Husband	Girl	
1951–53	The Railroad Hour	Various characters	
1954	Stars over Hollywood	Lovely woman	"Miss Nettie"
1958–64	Heartbeat Theatre	Various characters	Multiple characters
1961	Whispering Streets	Narrator	
1973	The Hollywood Radio Theater	Various characters	Multiple episodes
1975	CBS Radio Mystery Theater	Various characters	Multiple episodes
1979	Alien Worlds	Various characters	"The Keeper of Eight"
1979–80	Sears Radio Theater	Various characters	Multiple episodes
1992–2012	Adventures in Odyssey	Joanne Allen; Maureen Hodges	

=== Film ===
Year	Film	Role	Notes
1938	Cocoanut Grove	Girl	Uncredited
1938	Hunted Men	Bit Part	Uncredited
1938	Sing You Sinners	Bit Part	Uncredited
1938	The Arkansas Traveler	Townsgirl	Uncredited
1938	Tom Sawyer, Detective	Ruth Phelps	
1938	Zaza	Simone	
1939	Disbarred	Bit Part	Uncredited
1939	Paris Honeymoon	Village girl	Uncredited
1939	Persons in Hiding	Ruth Waldron	
1939	Cafe Society	Girl	Uncredited
1939	I'm from Missouri	Hat Check Girl	Uncredited
1939	Unmarried	Secretary	Uncredited
1939	Undercover Doctor	Bridesmaid	Uncredited
1939	The Gracie Allen Murder Case	Cigarette girl	Uncredited
1939	Grand Jury Secrets	Hat Check Girl	Uncredited
1939	The Star Maker	Stella	
1939	Honeymoon in Bali	Fortune Girl's Companion	Uncredited
1939	What a Life	Gwen	
1939	All Women Have Secrets	Doris	
1939	Our Neighbors – The Carters	Receptionist	Uncredited
1940	Parole Fixer	Switchboard Operator	Uncredited
1940	The Farmer's Daughter	Switchboard Operator	Uncredited
1940	Adventure in Diamonds	Telephone Operator	Uncredited
1940	If I Had My Way	Miss Courtney	Uncredited
1940	Waterloo Bridge	Elsa	
1940	The Way of All Flesh	Hat Check Girl	Uncredited
1940	One Man's Law	Joyce Logan	
1940	Those Were the Days!	Miss Willowboughy	Uncredited
1940	Rhythm on the River	Westlake's Receptionist	Uncredited
1941	So Ends Our Night	Jacqueline	Uncredited
1941	Silver Stallion	Janice Walton	
1941	The Bandit Trail	Ellen Grant	
1942	Land of the Open Range	Mary Cook	
1963	Habit Rabbit	Rhonda/Esmerelda	Loopy De Loop short
1964	Bear Hug	Emmy-Lou	Loopy De Loop short
1964	Bear Knuckles	Emmy-Lou	Loopy De Loop short
1966	The Man Called Flintstone	Roberta; Nurse #2; Nurse #3	Animated film
1972	A Christmas Story	Additional voices	Television film
1973	Fantastic Planet	Hollow Log Chief; Tiwa's Mother; Draag Child; Additional Voices	English dub
1979	The Story of Heidi	Aunt Dete	English dub
1982	Heidi's Song	Tinette	Animated film
1987	The Jetsons Meet the Flintstones	Judy Jetson; S.A.R.A.	Animated film
1987	Alice Through the Looking Glass	Alice	Animated film
1990	Jetsons: The Movie	Robot secretary, Judy Jetson (few lines)	Animated film
1993	Once Upon a Forest	Edgar's Mom	Animated film
1994	The Return of Jafar	Peasant Mother	Animated film
2000	Wacky Races	Penelope Pitstop	Video game
2008	Mel Blanc: The Man of a Thousand Voices	Herself	Video documentary
2009	The Jetsons Return to the Future	Herself	Video documentary short
2013	I Know That Voice	Herself	Documentary

=== Television ===
Year	Title	Role	Notes
1952	I Love Lucy	Peggy Dawson	"The Young Fans"
1953–65	The Adventures of Ozzie and Harriet	Janet	Series regular
1955	The Phil Silvers Show	Hazel	"The Eating Contest" (uncredited)
1962	Saints and Sinners	Marion Simmons	"Daddy's Girl"
1962–63; 1985–87	The Jetsons	Judy Jetson; Additional voices	75 episodes
1962–66	The Flintstones	Pearl Slaghoople; Pebbles Flintstone as an adult Additional voices	
1963	The Lucy Show	Marge	"Lucy's Sister Pays a Visit"
1963	The Andy Griffith Show	Amanda	"A Wife For Andy"
1964	The Magilla Gorilla Show	Hunnybun	Punkin' Puss and Mushmouse segment "Courtin' Disaster"
1964	Jonny Quest	Airport P.A. Stewardess	"The Riddle of the Gold"
1964	Peter Potamus	The Colonel's Wife; Girl Bruin	Breezly and Sneezly segment "Mass Masquerade"
1964–65	Valentine's Day	Libby Freeman	Series regular
1965	Please Don't Eat the Daisies	Miss Reece	"It's Lad by a Nose"
1965	The Secret Squirrel Show	Additional voices	
1965	The Hillbilly Bears	Goldilocks	"Goldilocks and the Four Bears"
1965–67	The Atom Ant/Secret Squirrel Show	Granny Sweet	Precious Pupp segment
1966	Get Smart	Telephone Operator	"All in the Mind"
1966	The F.B.I.	Arlene Morgan	"The Baby Sitter"
1966	Petticoat Junction	Violet Bentley	"Young Love"
1966	Alice in Wonderland (or What's a Nice Kid Like You Doing in a Place Like This?)	Alice	TV movie
1966	Laurel and Hardy	Additional voices	
1966–67	The Space Kidettes	Jenny	Series regular
1966–69	The Adventures of Superboy	Lana Lang	Series regular
1967	The Fantastic Four	Princess Pearla	"The Micro World of Dr. Doom"
1967	Abbott & Costello Cartoon	Additional voices	
1967	The New Adventures of Superman	Lana Lang	
1967	Space Ghost and Dino Boy	Nancy	"The Final Encounter"
1967	Jack and the Beanstalk	Princess Serena	TV movie
1967–69	Shazzan	Nancy	Series regular
1968	The New Adventures of Huckleberry Finn	Anointed Maiden of the Sacrifice	2 episodes
1968	Sally Sargent	Sally Sargent	TV Short
1968–70	Wacky Races	Penelope Pitstop	Series regular
1969–70	The Perils of Penelope Pitstop	Penelope Pitstop	Series regular
1969–71	Cattanooga Cats	Jenny Trent	
1970	Julia	Mrs. Appleton	"Call Me by My Rightful Number"
1970	In the Know	Josie	TV series documentary
1970–71	Josie and the Pussycats	Josie	Series regular
1971	Help! It's The Hair Bear Bunch!	Pipsqueak The Mouse; Woman	"Love Bug Bungle"
1971	Funky Phantom	Widow Wilson	"Haunt in Inn"
1972	The Amazing Chan and the Chan Clan	Additional voices	
1972	Tabitha and Adam and the Clown Family	Marybell / Georgia	
1972	The Roman Holidays	Henrietta	
1972	Josie and the Pussycats in Outer Space	Josie	Series regular
1972–73	Around the World in 80 Days	Belinda Maze	Series regular
1973	The New Scooby Doo Movies	Josie	"The Haunted Showboat"
1973	Speed Buggy	Additional voices	
1973	The Addams Family (1973 animated series)	Morticia Addams and Grandma Addams	Series regular
1973–74	Inch High, Private Eye	Additional voices	
1973–75	Jeannie	Mrs. Anders	Series regular
1974	Hong Kong Phooey	The Mayor's Wife	"Patty Cake, Patty Cake, Bakery Man"
1974	These are the Days	additional voices	
1975	The Tiny Tree	Little Girl; Lady Bird	TV short
1976	Jabberjaw	The Queen of Atlantis	"Atlantis, Get Lost"
1976–78	The Scooby-Doo Show	Beth Crane; Melissa Wilcox	4 episodes
1977	CB Bears	Additional voices	
1977–80	Captain Caveman and the Teen Angels	Additional voices	
1978–79	Galaxy Goof-Ups	Additional voices	
1978–80	Battle of the Planets	Princess; Susan; Mala	Series regular
1979	Gulliver's Travels	Additional characters	TV movie
1979	The New Fred and Barney Show	Additional voices	
1979	The Super Globetrotters	Additional voices	
1979–80	Scooby-Doo and Scrappy-Doo	Additional voices	
1980	Yogi's First Christmas	Cindy Bear; Sophie Throckmorton	TV movie
1980	The Trouble with Miss Switch	Miss Switch	ABC Weekend Special
1980–83	The All-New Popeye Hour	Additional voices	
1981	Thundarr the Barbarian	Circe	"Island of the Body Snatchers"
1981	Spider-Man and His Amazing Friends	Shanna the She-Devil; Zerona; Additional voices	3 episodes
1981	Unico	West Wind	English dub
1981	Daniel Boone	Additional voices	TV movie
1981–89	The Smurfs	Hogatha	
1982	Yogi Bear's All Star Comedy Christmas Caper	Murray's Wife; Lady on the Street; Bus Deport PA voice	TV movie
1982	The Adventures of the Little Prince	Danya; Rose Girl	1982 English dub
1982	Miss Switch to the Rescue	Miss Switch	ABC Weekend Special
1982	Jokebook	Various	7 episodes (4 unaired)
1982–83	Pac-Man	Additional voices	
1983	The Secret World of Og	Mother, Old Lady	ABC Weekend Special
1983	The Puppy's Further Adventures	Tommy's Mother	
1983	Alvin and the Chipmunks	Stella	
1983	Unico Maho No Shima	West Wind	English dub
1983	Beauty and The Beast	Beauty; Jacqueline; Queen; Additional voices	TV movie
1983	The New Scooby and Scrappy-Doo Show	Additional voices	
1983–84	The Dukes	Additional voices	
1983–84	Rubik, the Amazing Cube	Additional voices	
1983–86	Mr. T	Additional voices	
1985	Yogi's Treasure Hunt	Cindy Bear; Little Red Ridding Hood; Witch; Gretel	2 episodes
1988	The Canterville Ghost	Lucrecia Otis	TV movie
1988	Rockin' with Judy Jetson	Judy Jetson	Alternative title: "Judy Jetson and the Rockers"
1989	Dink, the Little Dinosaur	Woman Dinosaur	
1989	Hanna-Barbera's 50th: A Yabba Dabba Doo Celebration	Judy Jetson / Penelope Pitstop / Josie McCoy	TV special
1990–91	Wake, Rattle and Roll	Additional voices	Fender Bender 500 segment
1990–94	Tom and Jerry Kids	Additional voices	
1993	I Yabba-Dabba Do!	Pearl Slaghoople; Additional voices	TV film
1993	Hollyrock-a-Bye Baby	Pearl Slaghoople	TV film
1993–94	Droopy, Master Detective	Additional voices	
1998	King of the Hill	Mrs. Tobbis	"Pretty, Pretty Dresses"

=== Video games ===
Year	Title	Role
2000	The Flintstones: Bedrock Bowling	Pearl Slaghoople, Lulubelle
2000	Wacky Races: The Video Game	Penelope Pitstop
