= ABC Weekend Special =

American television anthology series

- Genre: Saturday morning anthology
- Starring: Cap'n O. G. Readmore
- Theme music composer: Tommy Leonetti (1977–90)
- Country of origin: United States
- Original language: English
- No. of seasons: 17
- No. of episodes: 132

Production
- Running time: 30 minutes

Original release
- Network: ABC
- Release: September 10, 1977 – August 30, 1997

Related
- ABC Afterschool Special; The ABC Saturday Superstar Movie

ABC Weekend Special is a weekly 30-minute American television anthology series for children that aired Saturday mornings on ABC from September 10, 1977 to August 30, 1997, which featured a wide variety of stories that were both live-action and animated. Similar to both ABC Afterschool Special and The ABC Saturday Superstar Movie, the ABC Weekend Special differed in that it was primarily aimed at younger viewers following ABC's Saturday-morning cartoon lineup, whereas the ABC Afterschool Special was known for its somewhat more serious, and often dramatic, storylines dealing with issues concerning a slightly older teen and pre-teen audience. The main focus of ABC Weekend Special was to encourage children to read.

With the debut of the ABC Weekend Special, some of the early ABC Afterschool Specials that had been targeted towards younger viewers were subsequently repackaged and re-run instead as ABC Weekend Specials.

== Presenters/hosts ==
1979–1981: Michael Young served as host of the series for two seasons.

1981–1984: Willie Tyler and his dummy Lester took over as the new hosts of the series, appearing in an opening segment introducing that week's episode as well as an ending segment wrapping up the show and often recommending the book that that week's episode had been based on.

1984–1989: The puppet character Cap'n O. G. Readmore took over as host of the series, along with Jon "Bowzer" Bauman, and/or other celebrity guest co-hosts. The character also starred in five animated episodes of the show, as well appearing in animated Saturday morning PSAs encouraging children to "read more".

== Title sequence ==
During the series' tenure on Saturday Mornings, ABC Weekend Specials had three main opening title sequence packages, all of which included storybook/literary elements and characters in varying forms.

January 29, 1977–August 1990	The Pop-Up Book The original opening, designed and animated by Rick Reinert Studios, consisted of a stack of books on a library desk accompanied by a rhythmic disco theme tune in the background. A larger book in the middle of the display (with the show's title printed on the cover) magically opens, with the ABC logo printed on the first page. Various figures from literature and intertitles pop up from out of the book. The intertitles read Children's Novels for Television and Short Story Specials respectively. The series title "blossoms" into view at the end of the intro. This was the longest running umbrella sequence in the show's broadcast history.
September 1990–September 1994	Reading is Magic With a new decade comes a new visual sequence and theme song. For this package, Weekend Specials combined computer animation with live action elements, as neighborhood kids discover the wonders of reading with a turn of a page and a little bit of magic. When the enchanted books are open, the readers become part of the story...from cowboys to undersea explorers to cave kids. One of the books (with the series title printed on the cover) magically grows and flips open, with Cap'n O. G. Readmore ushering the readers for fun and adventure. This opener was animated by San Diego–based American Film Technologies, with key animation by comic book artist Terrie Smith.
September 1994–August 30, 1997	Adventures in Reading During the mid-1990s, the graphics package was again updated. This CGI opener takes place back at the library, where we pan through a row of books. The camera stops at a book with the ABC Circle signature printed on the side. The logo then magically pops out and grows arms and legs and leaps to a book on a nearby desk. It opens the book and dives into an array of worlds and universes inhabited by letters! The Circle figure fights off combatants at a medieval castle, swings a vine in the jungle and flies through the Solar System in its spacecraft. The Circle figure ends its journey on the front cover of a book with the show's title beside it.
	Closing Credits The closing sequence varied over the years. In the 1970s and 1980s, a short version of the theme played as a bookmark floats into view, gently landing in the closing Pop-Up Book. An intertitle fades in: "Recommended by the National Education Association". The NEA intertitle was used until c. 1983.

== List of episodes ==
Listed by original airdate; however, many of the episodes were put into heavy rotation, continuing to air in reruns for years after their original airdate.

=== Short Story Specials (1977) ===
Four episodes:

No.	Title	Airdate	Production Company	Synopsis
1	Valentine's Second Chance	Jan 29, 1977	ABC Circle Films	A safecracker (Ken Berry) receives a second chance at freedom when he risks arrest to open a time-locked safe to save the life of a young boy named Joe Willie (Sean Marshall).
2	The Haunted Trailer	Mar 26, 1977	ABC Circle Films	Sharon (Lauren Tewes) and Mickey (Monie Ellis) are teenage sisters who discover that their motor home is haunted by four pesky male ghosts and join forces in their efforts to rid their home of the unwanted guests.
3	My Dear Uncle Sherlock	Apr 16, 1977	ABC Circle Films	A 12-year-old amateur sleuth (Robbie Rist) teams with his detective uncle (Royal Dano) to find the culprit who robbed a wealthy old recluse.
4	Homer and the Wacky Doughnut Machine	Apr 30, 1977	ABC Circle Films	Homer, a mechanically-inclined young boy (Michael LeClair), invents an automatic doughnut making machine to help save his uncle's (David Doyle) faltering coffee shop.

=== Season 1 (1977–1978) ===
14 episodes:

No.	Title	Airdate	Production Company	Synopsis
5	The Winged Colt	Sep 10, 1977	ABC Circle Films	(Part 1) Uncle Coot, a former movie stuntman and ranch owner (Slim Pickens) and his nephew Charles (Ike Eisenmann) become the owners of a colt born with wings.
6	The Winged Colt	Sep 17, 1977	ABC Circle Films	(Part 2) Uncle Coot refuses to believe the colt can fly, but Charles is convinced that it will.
7	The Winged Colt	Sep 24, 1977	ABC Circle Films	(Part 3) When the winged colt disappears again, Charles goes in pursuit and runs into an old hermit (Keenan Wynn) who claims he has seen Comet fly.
8	The Ransom of Red Chief	Oct 22, 1977	ABC Circle Films	Two inept con men (Jack Elam and Strother Martin) kidnap a financier's son – a mischievous boy who calls himself Red Chief (Patrick Petersen) – and request a large ransom for his return, but the boy turns the tables on his captors.
9	Portrait of Grandpa Doc	Nov 05, 1977	Phoenix Films	A young artist (Bruce Davison) prepares a tribute to his loving grandfather (Melvyn Douglas), a man who encouraged him to pursue his dreams.
10	Trouble River	Nov 12, 1977	Martin Tahse Productions	(Part 1) A young boy (Michael LeClair) and his grandmother (Nora Denney) ride a makeshift raft down a dangerous river to escape from a group of renegades.
11	Trouble River	Nov 19, 1977	Martin Tahse Productions	(Part 2)
12	Tales of the Nunundaga	Nov 26, 1977	20th Century Fox	(Part 1)
13	Tales of the Nunundaga	Dec 03, 1977	20th Century Fox	(Part 2)
14	The Escape of a One-Ton Pet	Jan 07, 1978	Tomorrow Entertainment	(Part 1) A young girl tries to save her prizewinning bull from the butcher shop.
15	The Escape of a One-Ton Pet	Jan 14, 1978	Tomorrow Entertainment	(Part 2)
16	The Escape of a One-Ton Pet	Jan 21, 1978	Tomorrow Entertainment	(Part 3)
17	Soup and Me	Feb 04, 1978	ABC Circle Films	The misadventures of two friends, Soup (Christian Berrigan) and Rob (Shane Sinutko) during one October day: skinny dipping in a chilly pond, dressing up as girls to avoid a bully and destroying a Halloween party with an out-of-control baby carriage carrying a giant pumpkin.
18	The Puppy Who Wanted a Boy	May 6, 1978	Ruby-Spears	Petey the puppy (voiced by Todd Turquand) goes through a series of harrowing adventures as he sets out to the city to adopt a boy of his own.

=== Season 2 (1978–1979) ===
12 episodes:

No.	Title	Airdate	Production Company	Synopsis
19	The Seven Wishes of Joanna Peabody	Sep 09, 1978	Learning Corporation of America	Joanna Peabody (Star-Shemah) is granted seven wishes by Aunt Thelma, a wise fairy godmother (Butterfly McQueen) who appears on Joanna's TV screen. Joanna squanders a few wishes before she learns the value of sharing.
20	The Contest Kid and the Big Prize	Sep 16, 1978	ABC Circle Films	Harvey Small, a 12-year-old boy (Patrick Petersen) enters a contest and wins first prize: the services of a butler named Hawkins (John Williams) for one month.
21	If I'm Lost, How Come I Found You?	Sep 30, 1978	ABC Circle Films	(Part 1)
22	If I'm Lost, How Come I Found You?	Oct 07, 1978	ABC Circle Films	(Part 2)
23	The $100,000 Bill	Oct 28, 1978	ABC Circle Films	An insecure insurance salesman (Donny Most) asserts his independence by telling off his boss and quitting his job when he finds a large amount of cash and later discovers he possesses counterfeit 1,000 dollar bills.
24	Little Lulu	Nov 04, 1978	ABC Circle Films	Little Lulu (Lauri Hendler), the mischievous little girl with big goals, and her friends crusade for women's rights when the boys object to the fact that their summer camp, Camp Whackadoo, has become co-ed.
25	Soup for President	Nov 18, 1978	ABC Circle Films	Soup (Christian Berrigan) runs for school president against Janice Riker (Mary Margaret Patts), the toughest kid in school.
26	Weep No More, My Lady	Feb 10, 1979	Ruby-Spears	Skeeter (voiced by Jeremy Lawrence), a young Mississippi boy, adopts a courageous dog named My Lady and together they challenge the dangers of a scary swamp when they are both held prisoner by a vengeful man.
27	The Horse That Played Centerfield	Feb 24, 1979	Ruby-Spears	(Part 1) The N.Y. Goats baseball team have not won a game yet, but manager Casey Balloo (voiced by John Erwin) has a brainstorm – he sends in Oscar, a horse who is very good at catching oranges – to catch flys in center field and figures that the team's playing will improve. Oscar manages to lead the Goats to victory.
28	The Horse That Played Centerfield	Mar 03, 1979	Ruby-Spears	(Part 2) With Oscar as a permanent team member, the Goats make it to the World Series. When the Goats win the first three games, Oscar is suddenly "horsenapped" and everyone sets out on a wild hunt to rescue him before the Series is lost.
29	The Baby with Four Fathers	Mar 31, 1979	D'Angelo/Bullock/Allen Productions	In 1946 New York City, four 11-year-old boys (Al Billera, Patrick Piccininni, Albert Ferrara, Eric Gurry) encounter problems when they find an abandoned baby girl and decide to "adopt" her.
30	The Puppy's Great Adventure	May 12, 1979	Ruby-Spears	Petey (voiced by Bryan Scott) is determined to prove he is an individual when his new owner is adopted by parents who do not like dogs.

=== Season 3 (1979–1980) ===
12 episodes:

No.	Title	Airdate	Production Company	Synopsis
31	The Big Hex of Little Lulu	Sep 15, 1979	ABC Circle Films	Little Lulu (Lauri Hendler) uses a fortune teller, pickle-flavored ice cream and her active imagination in a scheme to convince her friend Tubby (Kevin King Cooper) to donate money for uniforms for the neighborhood hockey team.
32	The Contest Kid Strikes Again	Sep 22, 1979	ABC Circle Films	Harvey the contest kid (Patrick Petersen) wins a flock of chickens and uses them to help his friend Hawkins (Alan Napier) out of a financial predicament.
33	The Girl with ESP	Oct 20, 1979	ABC Circle Films	Laura Hoffman (Rachel Longaker), a seemingly average young girl, suddenly finds her world turned upside down when she discovers she can envision events a few minutes into the future.
34	The Ghost of Thomas Kempe	Nov 03, 1979	ABC Circle Films	(Part 1) The ghost of a 17th-century sorcerer gets 12-year-old James Harrison (Shane Sinutko) into trouble when the boy refuses to become his apprentice.
35	The Ghost of Thomas Kempe	Nov 10, 1979	ABC Circle Films	(Part 2) Irish handyman Bert Ellison (Garrett O'Connor) volunteers to help James lure the ghost of Thomas Kempe back to its resting place.
36	The Incredible Detectives	Nov 17, 1979	Ruby-Spears	A trio of pets – Reggie, a bulldog (voiced by Laurie Main); Madame Cheng, a Siamese cat (voiced by Marlene Aragon); and Hennessy, a crow (voiced by Frank Welker) – join forces to rescue their kidnapped master.
37	The Revenge of Red Chief	Dec 15, 1979	ABC Circle Films	Two drifters (Jack Elam and Noah Beery Jr.) again face Red Chief (Patrick Petersen), the boy who enjoys being kidnapped, who becomes a part of their scheme to sell a fake rain-making machine to a drought-stricken town.
38	The Puppy's Amazing Rescue	Jan 26, 1980	Ruby-Spears	Petey (voiced by Bryan Scott) and Dolly (voiced by Nancy McKeon) have to outwit poachers, a hungry bear and a hawk to rescue their humans from an avalanche while celebrating Tommy's birthday at his parents' mountain cabin.
39	The Gold Bug	Feb 02, 1980	Highgate Pictures	A young boy (Anthony Michael Hall) joins an ex-slave (Geoffrey Holder) and a treasure hunter (Roberts Blossom) in a wild search for Captain Kidd's buried gold.
40	The Gold Bug	Feb 09, 1980	Highgate Pictures	A young boy (Anthony Michael Hall) joins an ex-slave (Geoffrey Holder) and a treasure hunter (Roberts Blossom) in a wild search for Captain Kidd's buried gold.
41	The Trouble with Miss Switch	Feb 16, 1980	Ruby-Spears	(Part 1) Rupert Brown (voiced by Eric Taslitz) and Amelia Daley (voiced by Nancy McKeon) are classmates who discover that their teacher, Miss Switch (voiced by Janet Waldo), is a witch with a magical talking cat named Bathsheba (voiced by June Foray).
42	The Trouble with Miss Switch	Feb 23, 1980	Ruby-Spears	(Part 2) Miss Switch and Bathsheba fly to Witch Mountain with Rupert and Amelia in their plan to stop the wicked witch Saturna (voiced by June Foray), who has condemned Miss Switch and taken control of the Witches' Council.

=== Season 4 (1980–1981) ===
Eight episodes:

No.	Title	Airdate	Production Company	Synopsis
43	Scruffy	Oct 04, 1980	Ruby-Spears	(Part 1) Scruffy (voiced by Nancy McKeon) is a lovable puppy struggling to survive in an unfamiliar world where she loses loved ones, battles fiendish foes and learns the value of loyal friends.
44	Scruffy	Oct 11, 1980	Ruby-Spears	(Part 2) Scruffy – frightened and freezing – returns alone to the big city and finds an affectionate new master, a ragged but regal Shakespearean street performer named Tibbles (voiced by Hans Conried).
45	Scruffy	Oct 18, 1980	Ruby-Spears	(Part 3) Scruffy meets a tough bulldog named Butch (voiced by Michael Bell) who takes her to join his family of strays who have set up a canine commune in an abandoned station wagon.
46	Arthur the Kid	Jan 03, 1981	ABC Circle Films	Three bumbling outlaws (Marvin Kaplan, Graham Jarvis, Charles Hyman) who advertise in the Medicine Bow Gazette for a "boss" have their careers redirected when a spunky 10-year-old named Arthur (Dennis Dimster) applies for the job.
47	Zack and the Magic Factory	Jan 10, 1981	ABC Circle Films	(Part 1) Zack and Jenny (Jim Gatherum and Olivia Barash) are two young people who combine their talents to operate a magic shop.
48	Zack and the Magic Factory	Jan 17, 1981	ABC Circle Films	(Part 2) Zack uses a little magic to save his aunt's (Jane Withers) magic-making factory from the wrecking ball.
49	Mayday! Mayday!	Jan 24, 1981	ABC Circle Films	(Part 1) Lou Parker (Don Fenwick) and his family are forced to make a crash landing in the High Sierras. With both parents trapped in the plane's wreckage, young Allison (Heather McAdam) and Mark (Brad Savage) set out alone to find help.
50	Mayday! Mayday!	Jan 31, 1981	ABC Circle Films	(Part 2) The prospects of rescue become increasingly dim as Allison and Mark struggle to elude a pack of wild dogs and encounter a rattlesnake ready to strike.

=== Season 5 (1981–1982) ===
Six episodes:

No.	Title	Airdate	Production Company	Synopsis
51	The Puppy Saves the Circus	Sep 12, 1981	Ruby-Spears	Petey (voiced by Sparky Marcus), after suffering a memory loss, finds fame as a performer, which saves the fortunes of a struggling family circus.
52	The Notorious Jumping Frog of Calaveras County	Sep 19, 1981	ABC Circle Films	A modern adaptation of the short story by Mark Twain about a young scoundrel (Billy Jacoby) who plots to win a frog-jumping contest at all costs.
53	Bunnicula, the Vampire Rabbit	Jan 09, 1982	Ruby-Spears	After a family adopts an abandoned baby rabbit, Bunnicula, mysterious happenings lead the family cat Chester (voiced by Howard Morris) and dog Harold (voiced by Jack Carter) to suspect their new peer is a vampire.
54	Miss Switch to the Rescue	Jan 16, 1982	Ruby-Spears	(Part 1) When Amelia (voiced by Nancy McKeon) is kidnapped by Mordo the warlock (voiced by Hans Conried), Miss Switch (voiced by Janet Waldo) returns to help Rupert (voiced by Eric Taslitz) rescue his friend.
55	Miss Switch to the Rescue	Jan 23, 1982	Ruby-Spears	(Part 2) Saturna the wicked witch (voiced by June Foray) is the real power behind this diabolical plot. Amelia begins to fade away and vanishes – a disappearance Miss Switch knows will be permanent, unless Amelia is rescued by nightfall.
56	The Joke's on Mr. Little	Feb 06, 1982	ABC Circle Films	An unusual school teacher (Richard Sanders) uses a little creativity to out-trick an inventive pair of pranksters (K.C. Martel and Georg Olden).
57	Stanley, the Ugly Duckling	May 1, 1982	Fine Arts Films	A modernized take on the classic fairy tale that follows an ugly duckling (voiced by Susan Blu) who befriends a loner fox and learns a lesson about self-esteem.

=== Season 6 (1983) ===
Nine episodes:

No.	Title	Airdate	Production Company	Synopsis
58	The Haunted Mansion Mystery	Jan 08, 1983	Scholastic Productions	(Part 1) Angel Wilson (Tristine Skyler) and her neighbor Billy (Christian Slater) embark on a quest to investigate the mystery surrounding an old mansion haunted by an old miser.
59	The Haunted Mansion Mystery	Jan 15, 1983	Scholastic Productions	(Part 2)
60	The Red Room Riddle	Feb 05, 1983	Hightide	Two youngsters (Billy Jacoby and Nicholas Gilbert) are trapped in an eerie haunted mansion by a ghost (Christian Hoff) who tells them that to escape, they must solve the riddle of the red room.
61	Horatio Alger Updated: Frank and Fearless	Feb 12, 1983	ABC Circle Films	(Part 1)
62	Horatio Alger Updated: Frank and Fearless	Feb 19, 1983	ABC Circle Films	(Part 2)
63	All the Money in the World	Mar 19, 1983	ABC Circle Films	A 13-year-old boy (Nyles Harris) gets three wishes from a leprechaun (Dick Beals), and wishes for all the money in the world. He then learns about the real-life ramifications of such a wish.
64	The Secret World of Og	Apr 30, 1983	Hanna-Barbera	(Part 1) Five young siblings – Penny, Pamela, Peter, Patsy and Pollywog (voiced by Marissa Mendenhall, Noelle North, Josh Rodine, Brittany Wilson and Julie McWhirter) – journey to the underground magical and mysterious world of Og, which is inhabited by small green people.
65	The Secret World of Og	May 7, 1983	Hanna-Barbera	(Part 2) The children and their pets continue their journey through Og. Penny and Pollywog are jailed by Og's little green town sheriff (voiced by Hamilton Camp).
66	The Secret World of Og	May 14, 1983	Hanna-Barbera	(Part 3) The children attempt to escape in a straw boat from an angry mob of Og people.

=== Season 7 (1984) ===
Nine episodes:

No.	Title	Airdate	Production Company	Synopsis
67	Cougar!	Jan 07, 1984	ABC Circle Films	(Part 1) A young boy, Albie (Matthew Vipond) and his sister Sarah (Kim Hauser), stranded on an island, are confronted by a hungry cougar and a pair of kidnappers.
68	Cougar!	Jan 14, 1984	ABC Circle Films	(Part 2) Albie and Sarah see their hopes for rescue dim when they are approached by two evildoers (Angus MacInnes and Wayne Best).
69	Cougar!	Jan 21, 1984	ABC Circle Films	(Part 3) Albie and Sarah triumph over their kidnappers, the elements of the wild and a raging river.
70	The Dog Days of Arthur Cane	Feb 18, 1984	Martin Tahse Productions	(Part 1) A full moon and an amulet are responsible for the transformation of selfish teenager Arthur Cane (Ross Harris) into a shaggy dog.
71	The Dog Days of Arthur Cane	Feb 25, 1984	Martin Tahse Productions	(Part 2) Arthur, who has been transformed into a dog, gets a new outlook when he befriends a blind guitarist (John Scott Clough).
72	A Different Twist	Mar 10, 1984	Scholastic Productions	When movie star Phil Grey (Peter Gallagher) does a production of Oliver with boys only, 12-year-old Christi (Allison Smith) disguises herself as a boy to get into the show.
73	The Bunjee Venture	Mar 24, 1984	Hanna-Barbera	(Part 1) Karen (voiced by Nancy Cartwright) and Andy (voiced by Robbie Lee) are accidentally transported back to the year 100,000,000 B.C. in their father's time machine. Trapped in the Age of Dinosaurs, the kids confront surly cavemen and are also rescued from a pterosaur by a lovable, orange-haired creature with an inflatable trunk named Bunjee (voiced by Frank Welker). These two episodes were based on Stan McMurtry's 1977 book The Bunjee Venture.
74	The Bunjee Venture	Mar 31, 1984	Hanna-Barbera	(Part 2) Karen and Andy return to the modern world with Bunjee, who is hardly ready for civilization and soon a couple of Bunjee eggs hatch into pure prehistoric pandemonium.
75	Bad Cat	Apr 14, 1984	Ruby-Spears	Bad Cat (voiced by Bart Braverman) is a lively cat who sets out to prove that a feline does not need to be tough to have class.

=== Season 8 (1984–1985) ===
Eight episodes:

No.	Title	Airdate	Production Company	Synopsis
76	Henry Hamilton, Graduate Ghost	Dec 08, 1984	Brookfield Productions	(Part 1) Henry Hamilton (Steve Nevil) is a ghost who has graduated from Spiritual Specter University and gets his first haunting assignment.
77	Henry Hamilton, Graduate Ghost	Dec 15, 1984	Brookfield Productions	(Part 2) Henry Hamilton teaches members of a modern-day family to believe in themselves and in their dreams.
78	The Bollo Caper	Feb 02, 1985	Rick Reinert Productions	Bollo (voiced by Michael Bell), a leopard brought to New York to be made into a fur coat, manages to escape to Washington to try to get Congress to declare him an endangered species.
79	The Adventures of a Two-Minute Werewolf	Feb 23, 1985	Scholastic Productions	(Part 1) Walt Cribbens (Knowl Johnson) is a teenager who transforms into a wolf-boy form for two minutes at a time and has no idea why he is a werewolf; he decides to seek answers with the help of his best friend Cindy (Julia Reardon).
80	The Adventures of a Two-Minute Werewolf	Mar 02, 1985	Scholastic Productions	(Part 2) Walt and Cindy's quest is complicated by a series of local robberies that throw suspicion on Walt.
81	The Return of Bunjee	Apr 06, 1985	Hanna-Barbera	(Part 1) Bunjee (voiced by Frank Welker), Karen (voiced by Nancy Cartwright) and Andy (voiced by Robbie Lee) must use the time machine once again and set out on an adventure to find a mother for the Bunjee babies.
82	The Return of Bunjee	Apr 13, 1985	Hanna-Barbera	(Part 2) Bunjee, Karen and Andy are transported back to medieval times where they must go through the obstacle of facing off against a malevolent sorceress and a three-headed dragon; eventually, they find a mother who also becomes Bunjee's mate named Bunjana and the kids return home to modern times.
83	The Velveteen Rabbit	Apr 20, 1985	Hanna-Barbera	Robert (voiced by Josh Rodine) is convinced that his toy rabbit is real. When he contracts scarlet fever, the rabbit is considered the cause of the illness and ordered to be burned. He is saved from "death" by a fairy, who turns him into a real rabbit.

=== Season 9 (1985) ===
Nine episodes:

No.	Title	Airdate	Production Company	Synopsis
84	The Adventures of Con Sawyer and Hucklemary Finn	Sep 07, 1985	ABC Circle Films	Constance "Con" Sawyer (Drew Barrymore) and "Huckle" Mary Finn (Brandy Ward) are featured in a female version of Mark Twain's classic tales of youthful innocence and adventure.
85	The Adventures of Con Sawyer and Hucklemary Finn	Sep 14, 1985	ABC Circle Films	Constance "Con" Sawyer (Drew Barrymore) and "Huckle" Mary Finn (Brandy Ward) are featured in a female version of Mark Twain's classic tales of youthful innocence and adventure.
86	Jeeter Mason and the Magic Headset	Oct 05, 1985	Highgate Pictures	Jeeter Mason (Kim Hauser) is a 10-year-old girl who possesses a magic Moon rock (voiced by Nancy Walker) that speaks to her through a radio headset and allows her to use its powers to do anything.
87	Cap'n O. G. Readmore's Jack and the Beanstalk	Oct 12, 1985	ABC Entertainment	Cap'n O. G. Readmore (voiced by Neil Ross) and his friends – Kitty Literature, Ol' Tome Cat, Wordsy, Lickety Page and Dog-Eared – are holding their Friday Night Book Club meeting in an alley next to the public library. When members of the Book Club start to poke fun at some of the characters from their favorite fairy tales, the bookshelves part and Cap'n O. G. is confiscated by those same characters. Jack (from Jack and the Beanstalk) challenges Cap'n O. G. to take his place in the story.
88	Pippi Longstocking	Nov 02, 1985	ABC Circle Films	(Part 1)
89	Pippi Longstocking	Nov 09, 1985	ABC Circle Films	(Part 2)
90	Columbus Circle	Nov 23, 1985	Highgate Pictures	Five children, members of the Columbus Circle Club, attempt to play a practical joke on a new, snobbish neighbor (Ron Parady).
91	The Adventures of Teddy Ruxpin	Nov 30, 1985	DIC Entertainment	(Part 1) Teddy Ruxpin (voiced by Phil Baron) leaves his home on the island of Rillonia with his best friend Grubby (voiced by Will Ryan) to follow an ancient map which leads him to find a collection of crystals on the mainland of Grundo.
92	The Adventures of Teddy Ruxpin	Dec 07, 1985	DIC Entertainment	(Part 2) Teddy and Grubby get caught up in an adventure involving a prince, a princess and all kinds of villains as they search for a treasure.

=== Season 10 (1986) ===
Nine episodes:

No.	Title	Airdate	Production Company	Synopsis
93	Cap'n O. G. Readmore Meets Dr. Jekyll and Mr. Hyde	Sep 13, 1986	ABC Entertainment	Cap'n O. G. Readmore (voiced by Neil Ross) and his friends are holding their Friday Night Book Club meeting on a rainy, eerie night. They select the story of Dr. Jekyll and Mr. Hyde and when the book is opened, Wordsy is kidnapped into the story and Cap'n O. G. follows to rescue him.
94	The Day the Kids Took Over	Sep 20, 1986	Highgate Pictures	(Part 1) Mayor Van Winkle (Lou Jacobi) awakens following a fall and discovers that children have taken over society.
95	The Day the Kids Took Over	Sep 27, 1986	Highgate Pictures	(Part 2) Mayor Van Winkle, who is now in a society where kids act like adults, learns an important lesson about the rights of children.
96	Liberty and the Littles	Oct 18, 1986	DIC Entertainment	(Part 1) Tom and Lucy Little (voiced by David Wagner and Bettina Bush) get involved in a dangerous adventure when they crash-land on Liberty Island.
97	Liberty and the Littles	Oct 25, 1986	DIC Entertainment	(Part 2) Tom and Lucy discover that their French ancestors, Les Petite Littles, are being persecuted by an evil general on Liberty Island.
98	Liberty and the Littles	Nov 01, 1986	DIC Entertainment	(Part 3) Pere Egalitaire (voiced by Jim Morgan) may be Tom and Lucy's only hope in convincing the French Littles that they are not demons.
99	The Mouse and the Motorcycle	Nov 08, 1986	Churchill Films	(Part 1) Keith Gridley (Philip Walker) is a lonely young boy who meets Ralph, a tiny, talkative mouse (voiced by Evan Richards) with a fondness for Keith's toy motorcycle. Ralph and Keith become best friends and the daring little mouse has the time of his life riding his motorcycle.
100	The Mouse and the Motorcycle	Nov 15, 1986	Churchill Films	(Part 2) Keith comes down with a bad fever and, even though his mouse family warns him of dangers like owls, cats and traps, a brave little Ralph sets out to find the medicine that will save his human friend.
101	Santabear's First Christmas	Nov 22, 1986	Rabbit Ears Productions	Santa Claus appoints a young bear as his helper in delivering toys to the animals in the forest and he becomes known as Santabear. [Narrated by Kelly McGillis]

=== Season 11 (1988) ===
Four episodes:

No.	Title	Airdate	Production Company	Synopsis
102	Cap'n O. G. Readmore Meets Red Riding Hood	Apr 02, 1988	ABC Entertainment	Cap'n O.G. Readmore (voiced by Neil Ross) and his friends are holding their Friday Night Book Club meeting. Cap'n O. G. makes the mistake of underestimating the value of a good villain and ends up meeting Little Red Riding Hood as the new Big Bad Wolf.
103	Here Come the Littles	Apr 23, 1988	DIC Entertainment	(Part 1) Henry Bigg (voiced by Jimmy Keegan) goes to live with his greedy and heartless Uncle Augustus (voiced by Hal Smith) while his parents are lost in Africa; living in the crevices of the house are Tom and Lucy Little (voiced by Donavan Freberg and Bettina Bush) who soon discover that Augustus enslaves Henry and is planning on replacing his nephew's house with a shopping mall.
104	Here Come the Littles	Apr 30, 1988	DIC Entertainment	(Part 2) Augustus sees Grandpa and Dinky Little (voiced by Alvy Moore and Robert David Hall) and, mistaking them for toys, he locks them in a desk drawer; inside the drawer, Dinky and Grandpa discover that Augustus forged the documents in order to become Henry's legal guardian, as well as to steal and redevelop the Biggs' property.
105	Here Come the Littles	May 7, 1988	DIC Entertainment	(Part 3) After a series of adventures, Henry and the Littles find evidence of Augustus' plot to steal Henry's home; Augustus is arrested, the house is saved and Henry prepares to meet his rediscovered parents at the airport.

=== Season 12 (1988–1989) ===
Five episodes:

No.	Title	Airdate	Production Company	Synopsis
106	Cap'n O. G. Readmore's Puss in Boots	Sep 10, 1988	ABC Entertainment	Cap'n O. G. Readmore (voiced by Neil Ross) who regales his library friends – Kitty Literature, Ol' Tome Cat, Wordsy and Lickety Page – with the humorous and witty tale of his great-great-great-great-grandfather, the legendary Puss in Boots.
107	Runaway Ralph	Oct 29, 1988	Churchill Films	(Part 1) Ralph the Mouse (voiced by John Matthews) is grounded by his Uncle Lester for not sharing his toy motorcycle. Ralph decides to run away from home on his motorbike and comes to a summer camp for children, where he befriends a lonely young boy named Garfield (Fred Savage).
108	Runaway Ralph	Nov 05, 1988	Churchill Films	(Part 2) Garfield is accused of stealing another camper's watch and Ralph, determined to clear his new friend's name, speeds off on his motorcycle and confronts the real watch-snatcher: a mean – and hungry – tom cat!
109	P. J. Funnybunny	Feb 04, 1989	Animation Cottage	A floppy-eared, irrepressible young rabbit named P. J. Funnybunny (voiced by Danny Cooksey) and his animal buddies seek to become celebrities by making contact with creatures from outer space.
110	The Monster Bed	Sep 09, 1989	Marvel Productions	A young boy (voiced by Brandon Crane) is mysteriously transported to a spot under a monster's bed.

=== Season 13 (1991) ===
Three episodes:

No.	Title	Airdate	Production Company	Synopsis
111	Ralph S. Mouse	Feb 16, 1991	Churchill Films	(Part 1)
112	Ralph S. Mouse	Feb 23, 1991	Churchill Films	(Part 2)
113	Otherwise Known as Sheila the Great	Mar 23, 1991	Tashmoo Productions	Sheila Tubman (Leah Foster) is a 10-year-old girl who attempts to overcome her two greatest fears – dogs and swimming – when her mother (Sherryl Simms-Foster) enrolls her in a summer camp.

=== Season 14 (1992) ===
Three episodes:

No.	Title	Airdate	Production Company	Synopsis
114	McGee and Me!: The Big Lie	Jan 25, 1992	Focus on the Family	An 11-year-old boy named Nick Martin (Joseph Dammann) and his family move into his grandmother's house. In an attempt to make friends, Nick unwittingly gets pulled into a web of lies and hearsay about an old man's house, which leads to bullies wrecking the house and Nick helps to clean it up in order to make amends. His father helps him learn an important lesson about lying, elders, fear, speaking up and bullying.
115	Cap'n O. G. Readmore Meets Chicken Little	Apr 18, 1992	ABC Entertainment	Cap'n O. G. Readmore (voiced by Neil Ross) reads the story of Chicken Little to his fellow feline friends at their Friday Night Book Club where they gather. Note: This is the last of the five ABC Weekend Specials to feature Cap'n O. G. Readmore.
116	The Kingdom Chums: Original Top Ten	May 2, 1992	ABC Entertainment	The Kingdom Chums – Essie, Christopher, Marvelous Mose, Little Miriam and Little David (voiced by Debby Boone, Tony Orlando, Billy Preston, Marilyn McCoo and Frankie Valli) – teach young children the meaning of the original Top Ten: the Ten Commandments!

=== Season 15 (1992–1993) ===
Eight episodes:

No.	Title	Airdate	Production Company	Synopsis
117	McGee and Me!: Take Me Out of the Ball Game	Sep 12, 1992	Focus on the Family	Nick Martin (Joseph Dammann) is on a baseball team, the Braves, coached by his father. It is important to them to win the game against their biggest rival, the Dodgers. And they think it is in the bag this year because of Thurman Miller, the team's biggest and best player.
118	Monster in My Pocket: The Big Scream	Oct 31, 1992	Hanna-Barbera	A batch of monsters are shrunken to pocket size by a freak accident. Carrie Raven (voiced by Dina Sherman), a horror author's daughter, finds the good monsters and together they battle the puny bad monsters, who have learned to grow temporarily when they hear a movie monster actress's scream.
119	Stanley and the Dinosaurs	Nov 07, 1992	Churchill Films	Stanley (voiced by Jim Cummings) is a boy who dreams of times long past. While on a field trip at the museum, Stanley's mind travels to an alternative Stone Age, where dinosaurs and cavemen roam.
120	Choose Your Own Adventure: The Case of the Silk King	Dec 12, 1992	Churchill Films	Two young Americans (Soleil Moon Frye and Chad Allen) find adventures while searching for their missing uncle (Charles Haid) in Bangkok, Thailand.
121	Choose Your Own Adventure: The Case of the Silk King	Dec 19, 1992	Churchill Films	Two young Americans (Soleil Moon Frye and Chad Allen) find adventures while searching for their missing uncle (Charles Haid) in Bangkok, Thailand.
122	The Parsley Garden	Mar 27, 1993	White Sneakers	During the Depression, a 10-year-old Armenian boy (Christopher Miranda) struggles with his sense of self and the extreme prejudice against immigrants in his community.
123	The Legend of Lochnagar	Apr 24, 1993	BBC Scotland	A Scotsman leaves civilization to begin a new life in Lochnagar, a mysterious land in the Scottish mountains that is inhabited by a race of little people that plant the flowers for the country. [Written and narrated by Prince Charles].
124	Commander Toad in Space	May 8, 1993	Churchill Films	Jack (Corey Miller) is the human navigator of the S.S. Stella, a space ship of the Algeian High Command that is run by frog and turtle-like creatures – Commander Toad (voiced by James Murray) and his assistants: Doc (voiced by Bruce Lanoil), Lieutenant Lily (voiced by Mary McDonald-Lewis) and the Admiral (voiced by Mark Hamill).

=== Season 16 (1993–1994) ===
Three episodes:

No.	Title	Airdate	Production Company	Synopsis
125	P. J.'s Unfunnybunny Christmas	Dec 11, 1993	Animation Cottage	P. J. Funnybunny (voiced by Troy Davidson) sets out to help sales at his father's toy store, ensuring that he will receive the Superblaster video game that he wants for Christmas. With the help of his animal buddies, he masquerades as Santa Claus to encourage townsfolk to spend money at his father's toy store.
126	The Magic Flute	Apr 30, 1994	Ruby-Spears	(Part 1) Based on the opera by Wolfgang Amadeus Mozart, a young prince (voiced by Mark Hamill) is given a magical flute by the Queen of the Night (voiced by Samantha Eggar) to help him rescue her kidnapped daughter and return her to the Queen.
127	The Magic Flute	May 7, 1994	Ruby-Spears	(Part 2) The prince is captured by King Sarastro (voiced by Michael York) and both the prince and the young princess discover the truth of her past, and that the treachery of the Queen of the Night has serious consequences for the entire kingdom.

=== Season 17 (1994–1996) ===
Six episodes:

No.	Title	Airdate	Production Company	Synopsis
128	The Secret Garden	Nov 05, 1994	Mike Young Productions	A mischievous orphan (voiced by Anndi McAfee) and her sickly cousin find joy and magic in a neglected garden on a British estate.
129	Jirimpimbira: An African Folk Tale	Feb 25, 1995	Ruby-Spears	A brave boy named Temba (voiced by Jamil Walker Smith) ventures to find food and water for his drought-stricken village. But when he is given a set of magical bones, he uses them to gain riches for himself instead of sharing with his friends.
130	P. J. Funnybunny: A Very Cool Easter	Mar 30, 1996	Animation Cottage	P. J. Funnybunny (voiced by Jason Barnhill) attempts to plan an Easter parade and an Easter egg hunt, despite some unseasonably cold weather.
131	The Magic Pearl	Aug 04, 1996	ABC Entertainment	(Part 1)
132	The Magic Pearl	Aug 11, 1996	ABC Entertainment	(Part 2)
133	The Magic Pearl	Aug 18, 1996	ABC Entertainment	(Part 3)

== Other specials ==
Occasionally, during the Weekend Specials timeslot, ABC aired a series of specials under the title ABC Saturday Morning Specials. Two ABC's Wide World of Sports for Kids specials were also produced in 1994.

=== List of other specials ===
No.	Title	Airdate	Production Company	Synopsis
1	The Great Alaska Dog Sled Race	Mar 06, 1993		
2	Rhythm and Jam: Rhythm & Rap	Sep 18, 1993	Greengrass Productions	
3	Rhythm and Jam: Melody & Harmony	Sep 25, 1993	Greengrass Productions	
4	Kids on Ice: A Skating Adventure!	Feb 12, 1994	ABC Sports	A behind-the-scenes look at the United States Figure Skating Championships. [Hosted by Maria Sansone and Kristi Yamaguchi].
6	Money Made Easy: The ABC Kids' Guide to Dollars and Sense	Apr 02, 1994	Paley/Price Productions	A two-part special featuring a kids-eye view of banking which includes a look at an ATM's innards. [Hosted by Christopher Castile].
7	Money Made Easy: The ABC Kids' Guide to Dollars and Sense	Apr 09, 1994	Paley/Price Productions	A two-part special featuring a kids-eye view of banking which includes a look at an ATM's innards. [Hosted by Christopher Castile].
5	A Day at the Races	Jun 11, 1994		
8	Crash the Curiousaurus	Jan 14, 1995	Kane Productions	A dinosaur (Bruce Connolly) and two kids (Michael Shulman and Lauren Brooke Hunter) explore the American Museum of Natural History.
9	Crash the Curiousaurus	Jan 21, 1995	Kane Productions	A dinosaur (Bruce Connolly) and two kids (Michael Shulman and Lauren Brooke Hunter) explore the American Museum of Natural History.
10	Wild Things: An Earth Day Special	Apr 22, 1995	Kane Productions	A special which explores the wonders of the animal kingdom and how people can help protect it. [Hosted by Jodie Sweetin, Jonathan Jackson, Marquise Wilson].
11	The Secret of Lizard Woman	Nov 12, 1995	Greengrass Productions	A teenage boy (Bradley Joseph) searching for his uncle on a reservation discovers his own Native American heritage.
12	Back to School with Schoolhouse Rock	Sep 14, 1996	McCaffrey & McCall	
