= Ruby-Spears =

American entertainment production company (1977–1996)

Coordinates: 34.1726°N 118.3158°W

Ruby-Spears Enterprises, Inc.
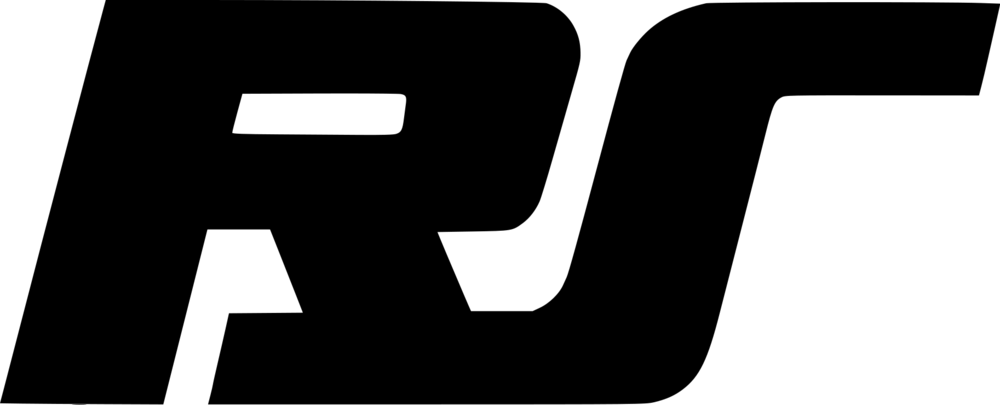
- Logo used from 1981 to 1991
- Type: Private
- Industry: Entertainment
- Genre: Animation
- Founded: 1977; 49 years ago
- Founders: Joe Ruby; Ken Spears
- Defunct: 1996; 30 years ago
- Fate: Closed and majority of assets absorbed into Warner Bros. Television Studios
- Headquarters: Burbank, California, U.S. Rome, Italy
- Number of locations: 2
- Products: Television shows Television specials Title sequences
- Parent: Filmways (1977–1981); Taft Broadcasting (1981–1987); Great American Broadcasting (1987–1991); RS Holdings (1991–1996)

Ruby-Spears Enterprises, Inc. (also known as Ruby-Spears Productions) was an American animation studio founded by veteran writers and the creators of Scooby-Doo, Where Are You!, Joe Ruby and Ken Spears, in 1977, before closing in 1996. It was headquartered in Burbank, California, with another branch in Rome, Italy.

== History ==
=== Origin ===
Ruby and Spears started out as sound editors at Hanna-Barbera and later branched out into story-writing for such programs as Space Ghost and The Herculoids. In 1969, they were assigned the task of developing a mystery-based cartoon series for Saturday mornings, the result of which was Scooby-Doo, Where Are You!. They left Hanna-Barbera shortly after because "they were having a hard time moving up" and wanted to be "associate producers". They were also writers and producers for DePatie–Freleng Enterprises, particularly for Barkleys and The Houndcats.

The company was founded in 1977 as a division of Filmways (later Orion Pictures) and sold in late 1981 to Taft Broadcasting, becoming a sister company to Hanna-Barbera, while Ruby and Spears were network executives at ABC supervising the Saturday-morning programming. ABC Entertainment president Fred Silverman wanted to create competition for Hanna-Barbera, which then provided the bulk of the Saturday morning content for all three major networks. Silverman was concerned the studio was stretching their projects too thin, diluting the quality of their series, requiring competition. The company's first production was The Puppy Who Wanted a Boy. The company's credits include the animated series Fangface, Goldie Gold and Action Jack, The Plastic Man Comedy/Adventure Show, Thundarr the Barbarian, Rubik, the Amazing Cube, the 1983 version of the Alvin and the Chipmunks series, Mister T, Sectaurs, Centurions, the 1988 Superman series, the Police Academy animated series and the American Mega Man cartoon series.

Among the unrealized projects at the studio were Roxie's Raiders, an Indiana Jones-style serial about a female adventurer and her allies; Golden Shield, about an ancient Mayan hero seeking to save earth in the apocalyptic year 2012; and The Gargoids, about scientists who gain superpowers after being infected by an alien virus.

Ruby and Spears' favorite Ruby-Spears-produced show was Thundarr the Barbarian.

Only two pre-1991 series, Police Academy: The Animated Series and Piggsburg Pigs!, used Canadian rather than American voice talent like most of their other cartoons. Ruby-Spears was also responsible for the animated sequence in the 1988 film Child's Play and replaying the sequence as a fictional commercial in the 1991 sequel Child's Play 3.

In 1991, Ruby-Spears was spun off into RS Holdings. Most of the pre-1991 Ruby-Spears Productions library was sold along with Hanna-Barbera to Turner Broadcasting System, which in turn merged with Time Warner (then Warner Bros. Discovery, now Skydance Corporation) in 1996. The Ruby-Spears studio closed later that year, after 19 years of operation. As of now, Ruby-Spears' pre-1991 library is owned by Warner Bros. through Warner Bros. Animation. The few pre-1991 Ruby-Spears shows not owned by Warner Bros. are Rambo: The Force of Freedom, which is owned and distributed by StudioCanal which also own and distribute the first three live-action Rambo films, It's Punky Brewster, which is owned by Universal Television (but distributed by MGM Television outside the US, along with most of the pre-2004 NBC Studios library), and Piggsburg Pigs!, which is owned by The Walt Disney Company through its acquisition of Fox Kids Worldwide (now ABC Family Worldwide) in 2001.

Ruby-Spears' post-1991 library are entirely composed of co-productions with external companies. Wild West C.O.W.-Boys of Moo Mesa is now owned by WildBrain, Mega Man is owned by Capcom and Skysurfer Strike Force is owned by Invincible Entertainment Group under license from 41 Entertainment, along with most of the Bohbot Entertainment library. The ABC Weekend Special episodes produced by the company are owned by the Walt Disney Company through Greengrass Productions.

The founders both died in 2020 within three months of each other – Ruby died of natural causes on August 26 at the age of 87 and Spears died of complications from Lewy body dementia on November 6 at age 82.

== See also ==
- List of animation studios owned by Warner Bros. Discovery
- Animation in the United States in the television era
