= Ken Spears =

American animator (1938–2020)

- Spears in 2010
- Born: Charles Kenneth Spears; March 12, 1938; Los Angeles, California, U.S.
- Died: November 6, 2020 (aged 82); Brea, California, U.S.
- Occupations: Animator, writer, television producer, sound editor
- Years active: 1959–2002
- Children: 2

Charles Kenneth Spears (March 12, 1938 – November 6, 2020) was an American animator, writer, television producer and sound editor. He was best known as a co-creator of the Scooby-Doo franchise, together with Joe Ruby. In 1977, they co-founded the television animation production company Ruby-Spears Productions. Spears and Ruby created many other shows such as Jabberjaw, Dynomutt, Dog Wonder, and Fangface. Spears also worked on the shows Sectaurs, Mister T and Alvin and the Chipmunks.

Spears career began in 1959 when he started to work for Hanna-Barbera as a sound editor. Spears met Ruby when Life magazine was interviewing members at the studio and they worked together on animated projects. Spears worked for several other companies before Ruby-Spears such as DePatie–Freleng Enterprises and Sid and Marty Krofft.

Spears died on November 6, 2020, from Lewy body dementia. He was 82 years old.

== Biography ==
Spears was born on March 12, 1938, in Los Angeles but was also raised in New York City. His mother, Edna (born Graiver), died a month after he was born, while his father, Harry Spears, worked as a radio host and producer before joining a real estate business. Spears became a friend of the son of animation producer William Hanna while attending high school in California.

As an adult, shortly after leaving the United States Navy, Hanna hired Spears as a sound editor for Hanna-Barbera Productions in 1959. During an interview of the Studio by Life magazine, he was introduced to the interviewers by Joseph Barbera and met Joe Ruby, also ex-Navy, in the editing department of the studio, and the two men began a writing partnership. Spears and Ruby wrote gags and scripts for several animated and live-action television programs, both freelance and as on-staff writers for Hanna-Barbera, Sid and Marty Krofft Television Productions and DePatie–Freleng Enterprises.

For Hanna-Barbera, Spears and Ruby created the Scooby-Doo franchise and its main characters: Fred Jones, Daphne Blake, Velma Dinkley, Shaggy Rogers, and the eponymous title character. The original series, Scooby-Doo, Where Are You!, debuted on CBS on September 13, 1969. After Fred Silverman, then head of daytime programming at CBS, concluded that, after about 15 drafts, a Great Dane was the star of the project, Spears and Ruby tried multiple ideas before settling on a cowardly dog who solves mysteries. For H-B, they also created Help!... It's the Hair Bear Bunch!, Dynomutt, Dog Wonder, Jabberjaw, and Captain Caveman and the Teen Angels, among other programs. At DePatie–Freleng, they created The Barkleys and The Houndcats. In the early 1970s, Silverman hired Spears and Ruby to supervise the production of CBS's Saturday morning cartoon lineup, a position they assumed at ABC when Silverman defected to that network.

Wanting to create competition for Hanna-Barbera, ABC set Ruby and Spears up with their own studio in 1977, as a subsidiary of Filmways. Ruby-Spears Productions produced further animated series for Saturday morning, among them Fangface (a group of teenagers again, but including a werewolf), The Plastic Man Comedy-Adventure Hour, Thundarr the Barbarian, Saturday Supercade, Mister T, Alvin and the Chipmunks, and Superman, among others. Ruby-Spears was bought by Hanna-Barbera's parent company, Taft Entertainment, in 1981, and its back catalog was sold along with the Hanna-Barbera library and studio in 1991 to Turner Broadcasting. Current reissues of Ruby-Spears shows on DVD and digital platforms are therefore copyrighted by Hanna-Barbera Productions.

== Death ==
Spears died of complications from Lewy body dementia at his home in Brea, California, on November 6, 2020, at the age of 82, three months after Ruby had passed. He worked with Ruby on the development of animated series until his retirement in 2002. Ruby died on August 26, 2020.
