= Joe Ruby =

American animator (1933–2020)

- Ruby in 2010
- Born: Joseph Clemens Ruby; March 30, 1933; Los Angeles, California, U.S.
- Died: August 26, 2020 (aged 87); Westlake Village, California, U.S.
- Occupations: Animator, writer, television producer, music editor
- Years active: 1959–2002
- Spouse: Carole Ruby (m. 1957)
- Children: 4

Joseph Clemens Ruby (March 30, 1933 – August 26, 2020) was an American animator, writer, television producer, and music editor. He was best known as a co-creator of the animated Scooby-Doo franchise, together with Ken Spears. In 1977, they co-founded the television animation production company Ruby-Spears Productions. Ruby would work with Spears and would co-create several other shows including Fangface, Dynomutt, Dog Wonder, and Jabberjaw among others.

Ruby met Spears in 1959 at Hanna-Barbera, when the studio was being interviewed by Life Magazine. The two would start working together on animated shows. Before Ruby founded Ruby-Spears, he worked at several studios, including Walt Disney Animation Studios, Hanna-Barbera, DePatie–Freleng Enterprises, and with Sid and Marty Krofft.

In 1996, the Ruby-Spears studio closed, and Ruby would keep working with Spears until his retirement in 2002.

Ruby died on August 26, 2020. He was 87 years old.

== Biography ==
Ruby was born on March 30, 1933, in Los Angeles, the son of Mildred (née Fineberg) and Carl Ruby, a doctor. His family was Jewish, and his parents were Canadian. He attended Fairfax High School. After graduating, he joined the United States Navy and worked as a sonar operator on a destroyer during the Korean War.

Ruby studied art and began his career in animation at Walt Disney Animation Studios in the inbetweening department. He began as a music editor, knowing it would take a long process to become an experienced animator, but nonetheless pursued his passion at the side as a freelance comic book artist and writer. He later worked for a short time in live-action television editing before moving to Hanna-Barbera, where he met Ken Spears. While Life Magazine was interviewing members of the studio, Joe Barbera would introduce the two to the writers at Life Magazine. Ruby and Spears teamed up to become writers for several animated and live-action television programs, both freelance and as on-staff writers, starting at Hanna-Barbera in 1959, before leaving the studio to become associate producers. They also worked as writers for Sid and Marty Krofft Television Productions and DePatie–Freleng Enterprises.

For Hanna-Barbera, Ruby and Spears created the Scooby-Doo franchise and its main characters: Fred Jones, Daphne Blake, Velma Dinkley, Shaggy Rogers, and the eponymous title character. The original series, Scooby-Doo, Where Are You!, debuted on CBS on September 13, 1969. After Fred Silverman, then head of daytime programming at CBS, concluded that, after about 15 drafts, a Great Dane was the star of the project, Ruby and Spears tried multiple ideas before settling on a cowardly dog who solves mysteries. For H-B, they also created Help!... It's the Hair Bear Bunch!, Dynomutt, Dog Wonder, Jabberjaw, and Captain Caveman and the Teen Angels, among other programs. At DePatie–Freleng, they created The Barkleys and The Houndcats. In the early 1970s, Silverman hired Ruby and Spears to supervise the production of CBS's Saturday morning cartoon lineup, a position they assumed at ABC when Silverman defected to that network.

Wanting to create competition for Hanna-Barbera, ABC set Ruby and Spears up with their own studio in 1977, as a subsidiary of Filmways. Ruby-Spears Productions produced animated series for Saturday mornings, among them Fangface, The Plastic Man Comedy-Adventure Hour, Thundarr the Barbarian, Saturday Supercade, Mister T, Alvin and the Chipmunks, and Superman, among others. Ruby-Spears was bought by Hanna-Barbera's parent company, Taft Entertainment, in 1981, and its back catalog was sold along with the Hanna-Barbera library and studio in 1991 to Turner Broadcasting. Current reissues of Ruby-Spears shows on DVD and digital platforms are therefore copyrighted by Hanna-Barbera Productions.

== Death ==
Ruby died of natural causes at his home in Westlake Village, California, on August 26, 2020, at the age of 87. His widow, Carole, specified that he died of complications from a fall. Dan Haskett made a dedication poster for Ruby's contribution to Scooby-Doo five days after his death. In November 2020, three months after Ruby died, Ken Spears would die at the age of 82.
