= Saphie the One-Eyed Cat =

Webcomic by Joanna Ho

- Author: Joanna Ho (Joho)
- Website: Saphie the One-Eyed Cat on Webtoon
- Current status/schedule: Completed
- Launch date: May 14, 2016
- End date: June 19, 2021
- Publisher(s): Webtoon, Graphix
- Genre(s): Slice-of-life, comedy
- Original language: English

Saphie the One-Eyed Cat is a slice-of-life webtoon by Joanna Ho (Joho). It follows Saphie, a fictionalized version of the author's cat. Originally released digitally on Webtoon from 2016 to 2021, it has been published in print by Graphix since 2025.

== Summary ==
The series focuses on the episodic escapades of Saphie, a lazy and food-obsessed one-eyed grey-and-white housecat. She is frequently accompanied by her owner Joho, Joho's family members, and the household's other cats; stoic orange-furred Simba, anxious brown tabby Sahn, and energetic and impish black-and-white kitten Sol. The cats are based on the author's real-life pets.

== Release ==
Volume	Release	ISBN	Reference
1	February 4, 2025	ISBN 978-1546124962	
2	November 4, 2025	ISBN 978-1546164005	

== Reception ==
Kirkus Reviews covered the first two volumes of the print release, noting the feline casts’ “realistically quirky personalit[ies]”, and described the series as particularly relatable and attractive to cat owners.

School Library Journal commented on the inclusion of extensive “close-ups, sound effects, and cat vocalizations” and compared the series to Pusheen.

Samantha Puc on K-Comics Beat, an outlet for The Beat, positively commented on the comic's adaption to a print format, and stated Ho did an "excellent job both capturing how cats behave and offering potential reasoning behind their actions."

During its Webtoon run from 2016 to 2021, the series had over 650,000 followers and 150 million views.
