= Precious Moments =

Precious Moments may refer to:

- Precious Moments, Inc., a company that sells porcelain figurines, and their product line of the same name
- Precious Moments (album), 1986 album by Jermaine Jackson
- Precious Moments (1998), an album by The Sadies
