= Bialosky Bear =

Teddy bear toy line

Bialosky was a line of teddy bear toys and related children's products popular in the USA during the 1970s and 80s.

The stuffed animals were manufactured by Gund. The bears were created by Alan and Peggy Bialosky. They sold the first bear at a charity flea market in Cleveland, Ohio. In addition to the stuffed animals, Bialosky products included a children's book series.

== Partial list of Bialosky titles ==
- A Camping Trip (1986)
- Bialosky and the Big Parade Mystery (1986)
- Bialosky's Special Picnic (1985)
- Bialosky's Best Behavior
- My First Cookbook: A Bialosky & Friends Book
- Bialosky's Christmas (1984)
- My First Computer Book: A Bialosky & Friends Book (1991)
