= Rick Reinert =

American animator

- Born: Frederick George Reinert Jr. September 14, 1925; Cleveland, Ohio, U.S.
- Died: November 5, 2018 (aged 93); Annandale, Virginia, U.S.
- Occupations: Animator, Director
- Notable work: Cap'n O. G. Readmore, Winnie the Pooh and a Day for Eeyore.

Frederick George Reinert Jr. (September 14, 1925 – November 5, 2018), known professionally as Rick Reinert, was an American animator and the founder of the defunct studio Rick Reinert Productions. In addition to his work on two Winnie-the-Pooh projects for Disney during the early 1980s, he directed intros for ABC Afterschool Special and ABC Weekend Special, and was also a producer on Cap'n O. G. Readmore.

== Career ==
=== Beginnings ===
Beginning in 1945, Reinert began working at the Metro-Goldwyn-Mayer cartoon studio and ended up at the Army Photo Center Animation Department in New York two years later. He was removed from both companies, but in 1960 he opened his own studio in Cleveland, Rick Reinert Productions, producing animation for TV ads; The Dipsy Doodle Show, a 1974 TV special (now considered lost); ABC's Saturday morning bumpers; intros for the children's series ABC Afterschool Special (1972); and ABC Weekend Special (1977).

In 1980 Reinert relocated his studio to southern California as he was contracted by Disney Studios. He later produced educational featurettes such as Foods and Fun: A Nutrition Adventure (1981), Winnie the Pooh Discovers the Seasons (1981), and Winnie the Pooh and a Day For Eeyore (1983).

=== Cap'n O. G. Readmore and later ===
In 1983, after the success of the Library of Congress's Read More About It, the Library's Center for the Book created Cap'n O. G. Readmore in association with ABC. During that period, Reinert created 30- or 60-second spots to promote reading for young viewers. In 1985, he began making 21-minute specials plotting the character, starting with Cap'n O. G. Readmore's Jack in the Beanstalk. He made four more until 1992 when Read More About It ended.

Reinert also produced other specials such as The Bollo Caper (1985) and The Kingdom Chums: Original Top 10 (1990), a direct-to-video movie that is a sequel to The Kingdom Chums: Little David's Adventure (1986). In the early 1990s, he produced specials based on Precious Moments figurines, like Timmy's Gift: A Precious Moments Christmas (1991). In 1997 he served as an animation supervisor on a half-hour Peanuts special, It Was My Best Birthday Ever, Charlie Brown.

In 2008, Reinert briefly returned to animation, working on the Pebbles cereal commercials at Duck Studios for Post for two years. He quietly quit making the advertisements in 2010 after Post got sued for plagiarizing the use of a Hulk Hogan caricature.

== Death ==
Reinert died in Annandale, Virginia on November 5, 2018.

== Filmography ==
=== Television ===
- ABC Afterschool Special (1972; introduction sequence)
- The Dipsy Doodle Show (1974)
- ABC Weekend Special (1977; introduction sequence)
- Disney Channel Donald Duck bumpers (1983)
- Cap'n O. G. Readmore's Jack in the Beanstalk (1985)
- The Bollo Caper (1985)
- Cap'n O. G. Readmore Meets Dr. Jekyll and Mr. Hyde (1986)
- Cap'n O. G. Readmore Meets Little Red Riding Hood (1988)
- Cap'n O. G. Readmore's Puss in Boots (1988)
- The Kingdom Chums: Original Top 10 (1990; direct-to-video)
- Timmy's Gift: A Precious Moments Christmas (1991)
- Cap'n O. G. Readmore Meet Chicken Little (1992)
- Timmy's Special Delivery: A Precious Moments Christmas (1993)
- Precious Moments presents: Simon the Lamb (1994)
- Precious Moments presents: Who's Who in the Zoo? (1995)
- Little Sparrow: A Precious Moments Thanksgiving (1996)
- It Was My Best Birthday Ever, Charlie Brown (1997; supervisor)

=== Film ===
- Foods and Fun: A Nutrition Adventure (1981) (Sub-contracted form Walt Disney Productions)
- Winnie the Pooh Discovers the Seasons (1981) (Sub-contracted form Walt Disney Productions)
- Winnie the Pooh and a Day For Eeyore (1983)
- Destination: Careers (1984; Donald Duck animation) (Sub-contracted form Walt Disney Productions) (Sub-contracted form Walt Disney Productions)
- Destination: Science (1984; Donald Duck animation) (Sub-contracted form Walt Disney Productions)
- Destination: Excellence (1984; Donald Duck animation) (Sub-contracted form Walt Disney Productions)
- Destination: Communication (1984; Donald Duck animation) (Sub-contracted form Walt Disney Productions)
- Mrs. Doubtfire (1993: animation background sequence)
