= Sam Butcher =

American artist (1939–2024)

- Born: Samuel John Butcher; January 1, 1939; Jackson, Michigan, U.S.
- Died: May 20, 2024 (aged 85); Carthage, Missouri, U.S.
- Known for: Precious Moments
- Spouse: Kathie Yott Butcher (divorced)
- Children: 7

Samuel John Butcher (January 1, 1939 – May 20, 2024) was an American artist. He was mainly known as the artist behind the Precious Moments brand of characters based on American-Christian themes. He drew in oil, water-color, acrylic, and mixed-media.

== Early life ==
Butcher was born in Jackson, Michigan, on January 1, 1939. He was the third of five children born to a poor family. Soon after his birth, the family moved to Redding, California.

As a young man, Butcher was a "chalkboard minister," spreading the teachings of Christianity through illustrations. This job paid very little, so he supplemented his income as a janitor.

With the guide of Reverend Royal Blue, Butcher made the decision to follow deeper into Christianity. He joined the Child Evangelism Fellowship (CEF) in Grand Rapids, Michigan. There he met Bill Biel, with whom he would start his first business, Jonathan & David (J&D). During his ten-year career with the CEF, Butcher's work was seen by millions of people through the Tree House Club television programs.

== Precious Moments ==
In 1974, Butcher created Precious Moments drawings for J&D, which were introduced to the market a year later. Before that, Butcher created many other works, from kitsch oil paintings to comic strips. These works can be observed at the Precious Moments Chapel in Carthage, Missouri.

Prior to 1978, Sam met Eugene Freedman at a Christian trade show in Los Angeles, California.

The three major products carried by J&D were greeting cards, porcelain figurines, and vinyl dolls. J&D sourced its vinyl dolls in Asia, leading Butcher to the Philippines. In 1981 Butcher and Biel traveled to the Philippines, where they gave financial assistance to a Bible college.

Some time thereafter, Butcher and Biel ended their business relationship. J&D suspended its greeting card business, passed its porcelain products to Enesco, and stopped producing vinyl dolls. The doll business would be relaunched as Precious Moments Country Dolls in 1989 and renamed Precious Moments Company Dolls in 1992.

Butcher founded the Samuel J. Butcher Foundation and Precious Moments, Inc. In 1989, he completed the construction of the Precious Moments Chapel on the south side of Carthage, Missouri. The Chapel and several other museums are on the property, along with a wedding chapel and reception area. He privately funded the purchase of land on an island in Aklan and built a resort called Sampaguita Gardens. Through this resort, Butcher provides employment and training opportunities for people from Aklan and students from other provinces in Western Visayas.

Later, Butcher moved to St. Charles, Illinois, and lived with his children.

As Precious Moments became more successful, Butcher began to spend more time at his resort in the Philippines. At the height of his popularity, Butcher fell ill due to strokes brought on by self-medicating. His children brought him back to the States, where he was diagnosed with bipolar disorder and treated. He then returned to the Philippines.

== Death of his sons ==
While Butcher was in the Philippines, his 27-year-old son Phillip was killed. Butcher was filled with grief and could not pursue his interests in art.

Butcher dealt with his grief by returning to art. He worked on paintings in what is now called Phillip's Room at the Chapel. According to Chapel employees who watched Butcher, "it was as though he was possessed by depression and anger. Finally, his body and mind could take it no more. Sam broke down, and stopped."

Butcher's children urged their father to take better care of himself and took over all business responsibilities at PMI. Butcher left for the Philippines for an extended period.

His son Tim Butcher died on October 14, 2012, having been the inspiration for many Precious Moments pieces. Butcher built a Belltower called "Timmy's Tower", in remembrance of his son, containing a poem Samuel wrote.

== From 2012 ==
As of 2012, Sam Butcher resided in the Philippines and his sons, Jon and Don, controlled PMI and most of his artistic assets.

Butcher made appearances at the Precious Moments Chapel in Carthage during the summer for Precious Moments Family Reunion events. He died at his home in Carthage, Missouri on May 20, 2024, at the age of 85.
