= Last Christmas (film) =

2019 film by Paul Feig

- Theatrical release poster
- Directed by: Paul Feig
- Screenplay by: Emma Thompson; Bryony Kimmings
- Story by: Emma Thompson; Greg Wise
- Based on: "Last Christmas" by Wham!
- Produced by: David Livingstone; Emma Thompson; Paul Feig; Jessie Henderson
- Starring: Emilia Clarke; Henry Golding; Michelle Yeoh; Emma Thompson
- Cinematography: John Schwartzman
- Edited by: Brent White
- Music by: Theodore Shapiro
- Production companies: Universal Pictures; Feigco Entertainment; Perfect World Pictures; Calamity Films
- Distributed by: Universal Pictures
- Release dates: 8 November 2019 (United States); 15 November 2019 (United Kingdom)
- Running time: 103 minutes
- Countries: United Kingdom; United States
- Languages: English, Croatian
- Budget: $25–30 million
- Box office: $123.4 million

Last Christmas is a 2019 Christmas romantic comedy-drama film directed by Paul Feig and written by Bryony Kimmings and Emma Thompson, who co-developed the story concept with her husband, Greg Wise. Based on the 1984 song of the same name by Wham!, the film stars Emilia Clarke as a disillusioned Christmas store worker who forms a relationship with a mysterious man (Henry Golding) and begins to fall for him; Thompson and Michelle Yeoh also star.

Last Christmas was theatrically released in the United States on 8 November 2019 and in the United Kingdom on 15 November 2019 by Universal Pictures. It received mixed reviews from critics, who praised the performances and chemistry of Clarke and Golding, but criticised the screenplay and story. The film grossed $123 million worldwide.

== Plot ==
Young aspiring singer Katarina "Kate" Andrich aimlessly bounces between her friends’ places. She works a dead-end job in Central London as an elf at a year-round Christmas shop, whose strict but good-hearted owner calls herself "Santa". Kate strikes up a conversation with Tom Webster, a cycle courier standing outside the store.

After an unsuccessful singing audition, Kate goes for a walk with Tom, who charms her with his unusual observations of London. Upon being evicted by her oldest friend, Kate reluctantly returns home to her parents, both Yugoslavian immigrants. Her mother Petra has depression, and her father Ivan, a former lawyer, works as a minicab driver. Kate feels suffocated by her mother, who dotes on her while neglecting Kate's older sister, Marta, a successful lawyer who is a lesbian but hides her sexual orientation from their parents.

Kate spends more time with Tom, who volunteers at a homeless shelter, which she initially mocks. He often disappears for days and says he keeps his phone in a cupboard; looking for him, she begins helping at the shelter. Kate hopes to run into him, but finds that the staff do not know him.

At a celebration for Marta's promotion, Kate spitefully outs Marta as a lesbian to their parents. Storming out, she then runs into Tom, who takes her back to his sparse apartment. Kate reveals that, a year earlier, she had to have a heart transplant. She says she feels half-dead and questions whether she has the talent to make it as a performer. After opening up to Tom, Kate tries to initiate sex. He declines, but gives her a goodnight kiss.

Kate begins taking small steps to improve her life: taking care of herself, setting up Santa with a Danish man who loves Christmas as much as she does, apologising to Marta and her girlfriend, and busks for money for the shelter singing Christmas songs. She runs into Tom, who says he has something important to tell her, but she preemptively asserts he is fearful of commitment and walks away.

Kate continues to do good in her daily life. Finally, wanting to make amends with Tom, she returns to his apartment, where she meets an estate agent who says the apartment has been vacant for months due to probate, revealing that the previous owner died in an accident the previous year. Kate collapses in shock before leaving and wandering the city, realising Tom was the donor whose heart she received. Kate finds Tom's memorial bench and shares a final moment with his spirit, who explains he is a part of her and asks her to take care of his heart.

On Christmas Eve, Kate organises a show utilising the talents of the people at the shelter and invites her friends and family, including Santa and her Danish admirer, along with the real estate agent she met at Tom's apartment. She delicately performs a solo of the Wham! song, "Last Christmas", and revelry ensues when the curtain rises, and she is joined by the band of homeless performers. The next day, Kate and her family celebrate Christmas, joined by Marta's girlfriend Alba for the first time. The following summer, a visibly healthier Kate sits on Tom's memorial bench. Smiling, she looks up, as Tom always encouraged her to do.

== Cast ==
- Emilia Clarke as Katarina "Kate" Andrich
  - Madison Ingoldsby as young Kate
- Henry Golding as Thomas "Tom" Webster
- Emma Thompson as Petra Andrich, Kate's mother
- Boris Isaković as Ivan Andrich, Kate's father
- Lydia Leonard as Marta Andrich, Kate's older sister
  - Lucy Miller as young Marta
- Michelle Yeoh as Santa / Huang Qing Shin, the owner of the Christmas shop where Kate works
- Maxim Baldry as Ed
- Margaret Clunie as Shower Sarah
- John-Luke Roberts as Klaus the German Clown
- Fabien Frankel as Fabien
- Bilal Zafar as Oscar
- Patti LuPone as Joyce
- Michael Addo as Fit-Looking Guy
- Peter Mygind as The Dane a.k.a. "Boy"
- Rob Delaney as Theatre Director
- Peter Serafinowicz as Theatre Producer
- Ben Owen-Jones as Danny
- Calvin Demba as Nathan
- Ritu Arya as Jenna
- Ansu Kabia as Rufus
- Jade Anouka as Alba, Marta's Girlfriend
- Anna Calder-Marshall as Dora
- Sue Perkins as Ice Show Director
- Ingrid Oliver as Police Woman Crowley
- Laura Evelyn as Police Woman Churchill

Andrew Ridgeley, from the duo Wham!, whose song "Last Christmas" is instrumental to the plot, has an uncredited cameo appearance in the audience at the end of the film.

== Production ==
In September 2018, it was reported that Emilia Clarke and Henry Golding would star in a London-set romantic comedy taking place at Christmas, titled Last Christmas. Paul Feig was set to direct, with Emma Thompson and Greg Wise co-writing the screenplay. In October, it was announced that Thompson would star as well, and that the film would feature the music of the late singer George Michael (who died in 2016), including "Last Christmas", and previously unreleased tracks. In November 2018, Michelle Yeoh joined the cast of the film. In November 2021, it was revealed that Harry Styles had been approached for the role of Tom, but declined it, stating that he felt he was "too young to take the role".

Last Christmas was filmed from 26 November 2018 to February 2019. Filming locations included Piccadilly Circus, the Strand, Regent Street, the Thames Embankment, Covent Garden (where the Christmas shop is located), West London Film Studios, St Mary's Bryanston Square Church, Marylebone and the Phoenix Garden. On 31 October 2019, Thompson and Wise published a collection of personal essays about the meaning of Christmas in a book also called Last Christmas. Contributors include Andy Serkis, Caitlin Moran, Olivia Colman and Emily Watson. The profits from the book went to two charities, Crisis and The Refugee Council.

=== Music ===
The musical score was composed by Theodore Shapiro. Back Lot Music has released the film score.

An official soundtrack album was released by Legacy Recordings on CD, two-disc vinyl, and digital formats on 8 November 2019. The album contains 14 Wham! and solo George Michael songs, as well as a previously unreleased song originally completed in 2015 titled "This Is How (We Want You to Get High)". The soundtrack album debuted at number one on the UK Official Soundtrack Albums Chart and at number 11 on the UK Albums Chart on 15 November 2019. It also entered the Australian Albums Chart at number seven and peaked at number 26 on the Irish Albums Chart. On the US Billboard 200 albums chart, the soundtrack peaked at No. 16 in late December 2025

== Release ==
In the United States, the film was due for release on 15 November 2019, but was moved up a week to 8 November. It was released on 15 November 2019 in the United Kingdom.

=== Home media ===
Last Christmas was released on Digital HD from Amazon Prime Video and iTunes on 21 January 2020, and on DVD and Blu-ray on 4 February 2020.

== Reception ==
=== Box office ===
Last Christmas grossed $35.2 million in the United States and Canada, and $86.4 million in other territories, for a worldwide total of $121.6 million.

In the United States and Canada, Last Christmas was released alongside Doctor Sleep, Midway, and Playing with Fire, and was projected to gross $13–19 million from 3,448 theatres in its opening weekend. It made $4.1 million on its first day, including $575,000 from Thursday night previews. It went on to debut to $11.6 million, finishing fourth, behind its fellow newcomers. In its second weekend, the film grossed $6.7 million, finishing fifth. The film took in $3 million during its third weekend, finishing ninth and losing 1,043 theaters.

In the United Kingdom it debuted to £2.7 million, from 612 cinemas, finishing first.

=== Critical response ===
On Rotten Tomatoes, the film holds an approval rating of 47% based on 215 reviews, with an average rating of 5.3/10. The website's critics consensus reads, "Likable leads, terrific behind-the-scenes talent, and an intriguing musical hook aren't enough to save Last Christmas from its poorly conceived story." On Metacritic, the film has a weighted average score of 50 out of 100, based on 40 critics, indicating "mixed or average" reviews. Audiences polled by CinemaScore gave the film an average grade of "B−" on an A+ to F scale, while those at PostTrak gave it an average 3 out of 5 stars.

Owen Gleiberman of Variety gave the film a negative review and wrote, "It's twee, it's precious, it's forced. And it's light on true romance, maybe because the movie itself is a little too in love with itself." John DeFore of The Hollywood Reporter called it a misfire, however adding, "it earns some warm feelings for its determination not to be like anything else currently in circulation." Alonso Duralde of TheWrap compared the film to a Christmas album, and said it was not as good as Paul Feig's best work, though "it fulfills a craving for sticky Christmas pudding." Hadley Freeman in The Guardian contrasted Emma Thompson's 1995 high quality adaptation of Sense and Sensibility to Last Christmas describing it as "second-rate, absurd, [and] inexplicable".

Charles Bramesco of The A.V. Club called the film "a guilty pleasure" but criticised the plot twist as predictable. He praised Clarke for her performance, saying "she succeeds in the only real meaningful test of rom-com skill, in that she makes us want her to be happy."

David Fear of Rolling Stone described the film as "incredibly, shockingly, monumentally bad. The kind of bad that falls somewhere between finding a lump of coal in your stocking and discovering one painfully lodged in your rectum."

=== Accolades ===
Last Christmas was also one of 100 films that received the ReFrame Stamp for 2019, awarded by the gender equity coalition ReFrame for films that are proven to have gender-balanced hiring. It received a nomination for Best Romance at the 2021 Golden Trailer Awards.

== See also ==
- List of Christmas films
