= Eugene Freedman =

American businessman

- Born: March 9, 1925; Philadelphia, Pennsylvania USA
- Died: February 19, 2008; Maui, Hawaii USA
- Occupation: Businessman (Entrepreneur)

Eugene Freedman (March 9, 1925 – February 19, 2008) (a.k.a. Gene Freedman, Gene-san) was an entrepreneur and philanthropist. He is widely known as the founder of the Enesco Corporation, the worldwide distributor for Precious Moments porcelain figurines between 1997 and 2005.

== Early life and education ==
Born in Philadelphia to parents Isadore and Ethel Freedman. When Eugene was still a small child, the family moved to Milwaukee, Wisconsin. He attended Northwestern University and California Institute of Technology. He received his Navy commission at University of Notre Dame and is a World War II veteran.

== Career ==
He began his career in 1947 as a salesman for a Milwaukee-based gift and novelty company under his own name, Eugene Freedman, Co. An example of the company's product was a series of Western themed chalkware plaques sold under the label of the artist Dan Muller Creations. Several years later, it became the Freedman-Mathews Corporation. He resigned in 1958 to become one of the founders of Enesco Imports, a subsidiary of N. Shure, Co., one of the largest and oldest general merchandise catalog companies in Chicago. When N. Shure was sold to Butler Brothers in 1967, Freedman became president and CEO of this subsidiary, renamed Enesco Corporation. The company was sold three more times, ending up named Stanhome, Inc. in 1983. In 1998, when Enesco took over Stanhome's assets, Freedman stepped down as president and CEO but remained active in the corporate workings of the company thus the company presented him with the title of "Founding Chairman". By the time he left the company in March 2005, Enesco had become Enesco Group, Inc, a global leader in gift and collectibles with offices in the UK, Hong Kong, and markets in South America.

Freedman is credited with the success of the Precious Moments gift and collectibles.

== Retirement ==
Even after retirement Freedman continued to maintain a presence in the industry. He served as "Ambassador of Goodwill" for Precious Moments Inc. when that company took ownership of the Precious Moments figurine line, and also lent a hand to gift vendor Starlite Originals, which produced a line of collectibles, Elsa's Safari, named in honor of Freedman's granddaughter.

== Philanthropy ==
With his success, Freedman worked with Easter Seals, and served on the national board of Boys & Girls Clubs of America.

Freedman's philanthropic endeavors earned him well-deserved recognition. He received the Gift for Life's Chuck Yancy Lifetime Achievement Award in 2001 for his efforts to fight AIDS, the Boys and Girls Clubs of America's Herbert Hoover Humanitarian award in 2004, and the Easter Seals National Philanthropist of the Year award in 2005. Freedman was also honored with the Congressional Ellis Island Medal of Honor, and a special recognition award from the National Association of Limited Edition Dealers (NALED), among many other awards.

Freedman died on Tuesday, February 19, 2008 in Maui, Hawaii, where he had a second home. In lieu of flowers, the Freedman family requested donations be made in memory of Freedman to either the Boys and Girls Clubs of America or Easter Seals.

== Sources ==
- Eugene Freedman - Chairman Emeritus and Friend to All
- Cherry Lane Keepsakes - Eugene Freedman
- NECO Inc. - Eugene Freedman
- Eugene Freedman, 82, Was Enesco Founding Chair
