= Bronner's =

Bronner's can refer to the following:

- Bronner's Christmas Wonderland, the "World's Largest Christmas Store" which is located in Frankenmuth, Michigan
- Dr. Bronner's Soap, created by E. H. Bronner
