= Cap'n O. G. Readmore =

Fictional character host of ABC Weekend Specials

O. G. Readmore, in animated form.

Cap'n O. G. Readmore (invented by Puppet Studio) was the fictional character host of the American television anthology series ABC Weekend Specials during the 1980s. He was an anthropomorphic cat puppet, dressed in a nautical outfit, that encouraged children to read for pleasure. He hosted the show from 1984 through 1989, performing with guest stars including Vincent Price, Harry Blackstone Jr., Pat Morita, Joan Lunden and others.

The character also appeared in animated form in a series of ABC Weekend Specials, including Cap’n O. G. Readmore's Puss in Boots and Cap'n O. G. Readmore Meets Dr. Jekyll and Mr. Hyde. In these features, he was the president of an all-feline book club, the Friday Night Book Club, who often found himself physically pulled into the story he's reading.

== Plot ==
The voice of the character was provided by the American voice actor Frank Welker in the original public service announcements and while hosting the ABC Weekend Special. However, in several of the animated specials, such as Cap'n O. G. Readmore Meets Dr. Jekyll and Mr. Hyde, his voice was provided by Neil Ross. Many of the regular characters had fanciful names such as Lickety Page (voiced by Lucille Bliss) who is the youngest boy of the Book Club, Kitty Literature (voiced by Ilene Latter) who is the only female member of the Book Club, Wordsy (voiced by Stan Jones), who is the most gentlemanly of the Book Club, and Ol' Tome Cat (voiced by Stanley Jones) who is the oldest and wisest of the Book Club.

Other side characters include a Madam Mim-like witch named Calypso La Rose (voiced by Lucille Bliss) and a Count Chocula-like vampire named Vitack (voiced by Hal Smith) who runs an organization called the Villains Agency. Production was by ABC Entertainment in association with Rick Reinert Pictures of Burbank, California. All these specials were directed and produced by legendary animator Rick Reinert (Winnie the Pooh and a Day for Eeyore).

== List of shorts ==
No.	Title	Original release date
1	"Cap'n O. G. Readmore's Jack and the Beanstalk"	October 12, 1985
Cap'n O.G. Readmore and his friends – Kitty Literature, Ol' Tome Cat, Wordsy, Lickety Page and – are holding their Friday Night Book Club meeting in an alley next to the public library. When members of the Book Club start to poke fun at some of the characters from their favorite fairy tales for their actions (believing that real life people would have done things differently), the bookshelves part and Cap'n O.G. is abducted by those same characters. Jack from Jack and the Beanstalk challenges Cap'n O.G. to take his place in the story. By the end, Cap'n O.G. learns that the characters in fairy tale stories try to make the best they can out of their situations, no different than real people. Note: Will Ryan voiced Wordsy, one of Readmore’s members, in this episode. Stan Jones took over as Wordsy in the next episode as Ryan failed to reprise his role for the character afterwards.
2	"Cap'n O. G. Readmore Meets Dr. Jekyll and Mr. Hyde"	September 13, 1986
Cap'n O.G. Readmore and his friends are holding their Friday Night Book Club meeting on a rainy, eerie night. They select the story of Dr. Jekyll and Mr. Hyde and when the book is opened, the butler character comes to life and kidnaps Wordsy into the story in an attempt to change its intended tragic course and Cap'n O.G. follows to rescue him.
3	"Cap'n O. G. Readmore Meets Red Riding Hood"	April 2, 1988
Cap'n O.G. Readmore and his friends are holding their Friday Night Book Club meeting. Cap'n O.G. makes the mistake of underestimating the value of a good villain and ends up meeting Little Red Riding Hood as the new Big Bad Wolf once the Villains Agency's leader Vitack decides to teach him to respect an appreciate the roles of villains in the storybook world. Of course things also become difficult when he appears to have eaten Little Red Riding Hood's grandmother and the real Big Bad Wolf shows up.
4	"Cap'n O. G. Readmore's Puss in Boots"	September 10, 1988
Cap'n O.G. Readmore, who regales his library friends Kitty Literature, Ol' Tome Cat, Wordsy and Lickety Page with the humorous and witty tale of his great-great-great-great-grandfather, the legendary Puss in Boots whom he has the boots of as a family heirloom.
5	"Cap'n O. G. Readmore Meets Chicken Little"	April 18, 1992
Cap'n O.G. Readmore reads the story of Chicken Little to his fellow feline friends at their Friday Night Book Club where they gather.

== Home media ==
Four of the Cap'n O. G. Readmore episodes were made available on Beacon Home Video in 1990; these copies are very rare and hard to find. The Chicken Little episode, made in 1992, has seen no official release on any video formats in North America. ABC Home Video released the first three episodes in 1993, which were all out-of-print since. The Dr. Jekyll and Mr. Hyde episode was released on VHS by Anchor Bay Home Entertainment in 1998 and is also out-of-print. As of 2020, there are currently no plans for any of the Readmore episodes to be distributed on DVD, but all of the episodes surfaced on DVD in South Korea.

== Inspiration ==
The feline character Cap'n Readmore was drawn on as a source of inspiration when choosing a middle name for Dewey Readmore Books.
