= Snuffles =

Snuffles can refer to:

== Science ==
- A common term for a runny nose; see Rhinitis
- Syphilitic rhinitis, a presentation of congenital syphilis
- A disease of rabbits caused by the bacterium Bordetella bronchiseptica

== Other uses ==
- Gund Snuffles, teddy bear made by GUND
- Snuffles (character), a cartoon character from Quick Draw McGraw
- A character from the animated series Rick & Morty
- A character from the comic strip Pearls Before Swine
- Sirius Black, a codename for the fictional character from Harry Potter
