= Snow machine =

Snow machine may refer to:

- Snowcat, a large vehicle with tracks, for grooming of snow or transport over it
- Snowmobile, a small vehicle for individual transport (the primary meaning of the term in Alaska)
- Snowmaking equipment, primarily an outdoor snow cannon with fan and compressor
- Fake snow machines, usually for indoors, often producing soap bubbles
- Snowblower for snow removal from walkways and driveways, or from roads and rail tracks
