= Department 56 =

American holiday-themed manufacturer

- Founded: 1976 (50 years ago)
- Founder: Edward Rudy Bazinet
- Headquarters: Eden Prairie, Minnesota
- Key people: Michael Griffith (president)
- Parent: Enesco
- Website: department56.com

Department 56 is a U.S. manufacturer of holiday collectibles, ornaments and giftware, known for its lit Christmas village collections and Snowbabies collection. It is owned by Enesco and based in Eden Prairie, Minnesota. The brand's first products were issued in 1976, and various distinct villages and sub-series have been introduced since then. An umbrella organization for Department 56 collector clubs was founded in 1992.

== History ==
Department 56 was founded in 1976. Originally, it was part of Bachman's, a retail florist based in Minneapolis, Minnesota. Bachman's employed a numbering system to identify each of its departments. The number assigned to the wholesale gift imports division was 56.

Edward Rudy Bazinet (born 26 November 1943 in Ramsey County, Minnesota) founded the company by convincing the Bachman family to invest $50,000 in starting the division in 1976. He was appointed its first president when Department 56 was spun off as a $15 million subsidiary in 1984. He was a talented employee of Bachman's who won the Minnesota State Florist Association's 1964 Designer of the Year competition. Bazinet sold Department 56 in 1992, and remained in company leadership positions until his retirement in 1997. Bazinet was a 1996 Gift for Life honoree for his support to HIV/AIDS research, education, prevention, and treatment. In 2000–2001, Department 56 donated at least $25,000 to the Walker Art Center in honor of Bazinet (who also donated to the art center that year). A $20 million spending spree by Bazinet at a New York gift fair in 2012, for which he received headlines, was reported as being due to a bipolar episode. Bazinet died on November 20, 2017, leaving a $54 million estate.

In 1993, the company was listed on the New York Stock Exchange under the symbol of "DFS". At its peak in the 1990s, the stock traded for $40 a share. In 2005, after purchasing Lenox from Brown-Forman, the company changed its name to "Lenox Group Inc" and its ticker symbol to "LNX". After failing to meet the exchange's requirements, trading was moved to the OTC Bulletin Board under the ticker "LENX". Lenox filed for bankruptcy in 2009, and was acquired by the private equity firm Clarion Capital Partners. Enesco acquired Department 56 from Lenox that year.

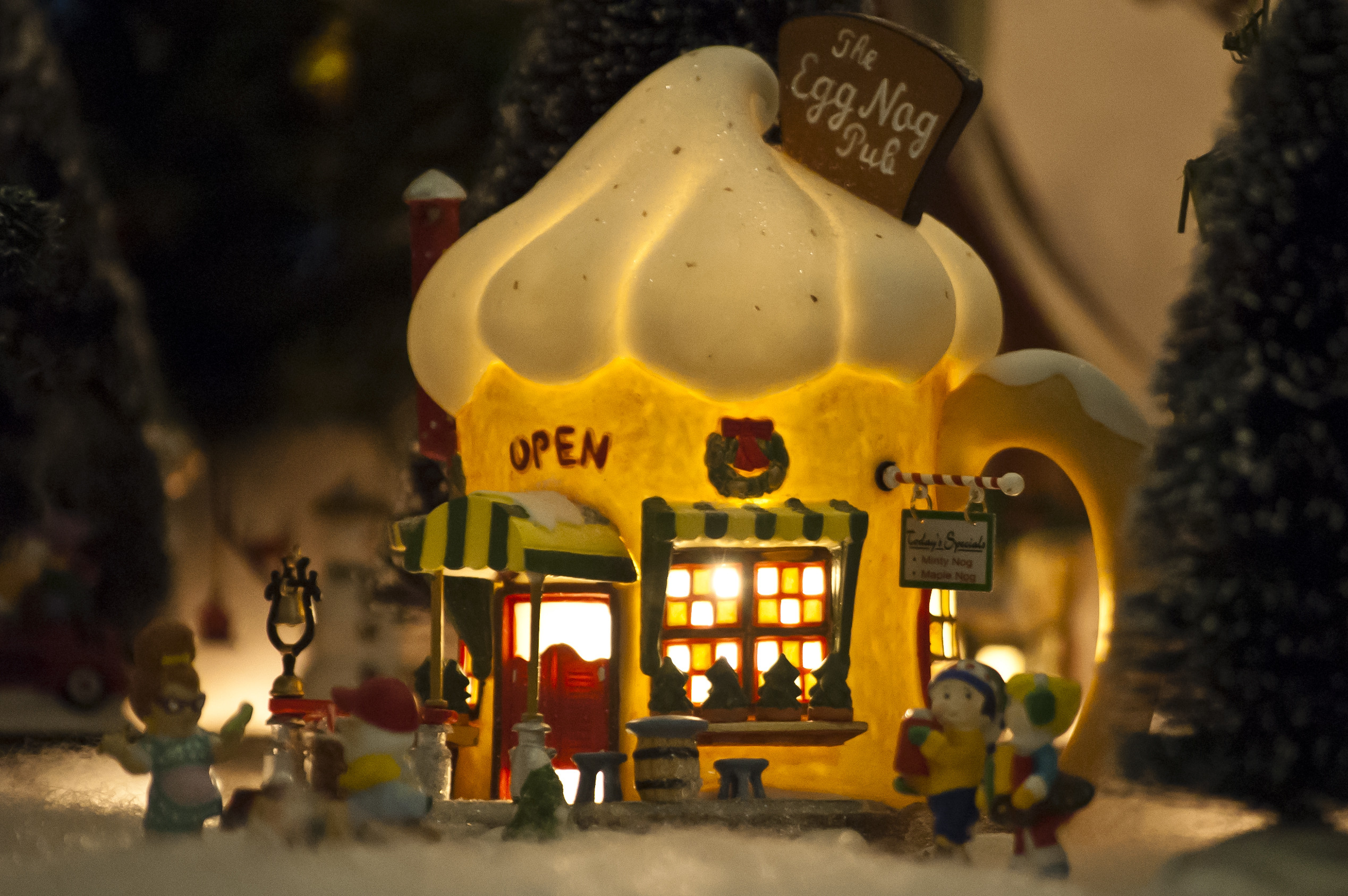
The Egg Nog Pub

Department 56 has been headquartered in Eden Prairie, Minnesota since June 25, 1991. As of May 2015, the company had about 30 employees, and its sales had grown seven to eleven percent per year over the prior four years. About two-thirds of sales are via smaller gift and Christmas shops, but the most recent growth has been through national retail stores, with Amazon also among the biggest customers.

== Villages ==
The brand began with the "Original Snow Village" collection of six houses in 1976. Each Department 56 item has its name on the bottom. Buildings are also dated, with the year of copyright rather than year of issue. The first Original Snow Village pieces were the Mountain Lodge, Gabled Cottage, the Inn, Country Church, Steepled Church, and Small Chalet, and are made of ceramic. The collection consists of over 225 pieces, including accessories.

A sub-series called "Christmas Lane" became a bestseller and includes what one vendor describes as "typical overly decorated homes located on the streets of America during the holiday season". In 2011, identical twin brothers Mark and Mac Sockwell won a national contest to have their home and its decorations developed into a new Christmas Lane house.

The "Heritage Village" Collection consists of several different villages and some sub-collections within each village. The first was the porcelain Dickens Village in 1984 with houses depicting the time of Charles Dickens and relating to the stories that he wrote. Pieces include The Cottage of Bob Cratchit & Tiny Tim, The Old Curiosity Shop, Nicholas Nickleby, David Copperfield, and Oliver Twist.

The "New England Village" started in 1986 and depicts the buildings and people of the New England area with its many churches, such as the Old North Church in Boston, lighthouses and farm areas.

The "Alpine Village" also started in 1986 and remains one of the smaller collections. It consists of buildings such as Josef Engel Farmhouse, Besson Bierkeller, Grist Mill and the St. Nickolaus Kirche church.

The "Christmas in the City" collection, set in the 1930s and 1940s, started in 1987 and consists of such pieces as the Palace Theatre, Toy Shop & Pet Store, Ritz Hotel, Dorothy's Dress Shop, Wong's, and a rare limited edition – Cathedral Church of St. Mark.

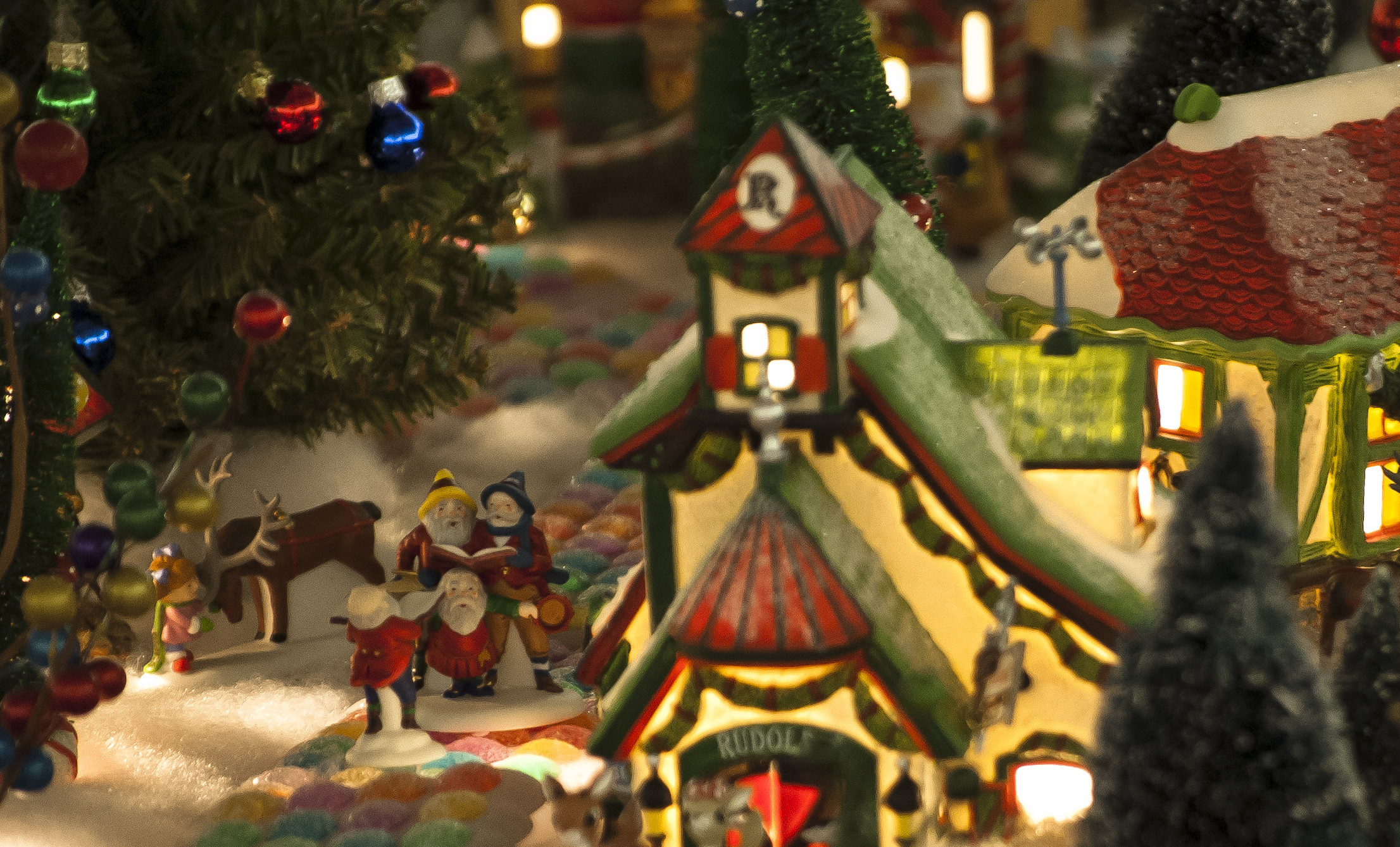
Carol singers in the North Pole series

The "North Pole Series" was started in 1990 with the introduction of three houses, Santa's Workshop, Elf Bunkhouse, and Reindeer Barn. The collection celebrated its 15th anniversary in 2005 with the release of five special edition buildings which, when put together, spell "SANTA".

The "Little Town of Bethlehem" was issued in 1987 as a set of twelve pieces.

"Snow Village Halloween" was introduced in 1998 with a Haunted Mansion.

In May 2016, Department 56 introduced two entirely new villages "First Frost" and "Holiday In The Woods".

As of June 2023, Department 56 reported use of ten licensed brands among its current products: Harry Potter, The Nightmare Before Christmas, Disney, National Lampoon's Christmas Vacation, The Grinch, Game of Thrones, Peanuts, A Christmas Story, Ghostbusters, and Elvira Mistress of the Dark.

== Collectors ==
In 1992, Jack Skeels (1930–2005) founded the National Council of Fifty Six Clubs (NCC) as an umbrella organization for Department 56 Collector Clubs in the United States and Canada. As of January 2024, the NCC recognized 62 member clubs across ten regions. In addition to club promotion and information exchange, the NCC helps sponsor collector gatherings which include seminars, display contests, and fundraising for local charities.
