= Winnie the Pooh Discovers the Seasons =

- Directed by: Rick Reinert
- Written by: Ronald Kidd
- Produced by: Rick Reinert
- Starring: Hal Smith; Kim Christianson; Ray Erlenborn; John Fiedler; Ron Feinberg
- Narrated by: Laurie Main
- Music by: Steve Zuckerman; Robert & Richard Sherman
- Production companies: Walt Disney Productions; Rick Reinert Productions
- Distributed by: Walt Disney Educational Media Company
- Release date: September 1981
- Running time: 9:28
- Country: United States
- Language: English

Winnie the Pooh Discovers the Seasons is an educational short film produced by Rick Reinert Productions for Walt Disney Productions' educational media division and released in September 1981.

== Plot ==
Christopher Robin presents Pooh with a new gift—a calendar. Pooh has never seen one before, and Christopher Robin explains that it is a way of keeping track of the days, weeks, months and seasons. The calendar stops at each season, as Pooh, Piglet, Eeyore, Rabbit and Owl in the Hundred Acre Wood explore the world around them and notice the changes. Among them: the water in the pond becomes hard and slick when it gets cold in the winter and becomes refreshing to swim in when it gets warm in the summer.

== Cast ==
- Hal Smith as Winnie the Pooh and Owl
- Kim Christianson as Christopher Robin
- Ray Erlenborn as Rabbit
- Laurie Main as the Narrator
- John Fiedler as Piglet
- Ron Feinberg as Eeyore

== Production ==
This was the first time that Hal Smith voiced Winnie the Pooh. Smith would voice the character until 1988 when Jim Cummings took over the role for The New Adventures of Winnie the Pooh. The short's director, Rick Reinert, had previously directed A Nutrition Adventure, another Walt Disney Educational short. Disney contracted the work on this short out to Reinert's production company, Rick Reinert Productions, in lieu of producing it in-house. Reinert would go on to direct 1983's Winnie the Pooh and a Day for Eeyore.
