= Elmo Aardvark =

Cartoon character

- First appearance: "The Life and Times of Elmo Aardvark"; Wild Cartoon Kingdom; 1993
- Created by: Will Ryan

In-universe information
- Species: Aardvark

Elmo Aardvark is a cartoon character, created by Will Ryan in the 1990s and featured in print media, music albums, and web animation.

Elmo is an anthropomorphic aardvark usually drawn in the style of the golden age of American animation; his fictional backstory is that he was the first animated cartoon character ever created. The backstory, embellished by Ryan and others in various media during the 1990s, traces Elmo's history from beginnings in pre-film flip books through widespread stardom in the 1920s and 1930s, and recurring reappearances and reboots in ensuing decades.

While attempts in the mid-1990s to adapt Elmo's backstory as a feature-length mockumentary fell through, the character went on to star in the 2000 web series Elmo Aardvark: Outer Space Detective and has been featured in comics as well as in four music albums recorded by Ryan.

== Origins ==
Will Ryan, a Hollywood voice actor, musician, and animation producer, created Elmo Aardvark as a pastiche of early cartoon characters. When film writer Chris Gore discovered Ryan's concept in 1993, he published a series of satirical articles in Wild Cartoon Kingdom magazine, describing Elmo as the first cartoon character in animation history.

According to the fictional account in Wild Cartoon Kingdom, Elmo was created by artist Terwilliger Ryan in 1889, in a series of popular flip books for a Cleveland, Ohio, newspaper. The Elmo character moved into animated cartoons before the First World War, and became a major star, despite various ownership disputes and technological difficulties. By the time sound film was developed in the late 1920s, the character had fallen in popularity, but a boost from fan Paul Whiteman brought Elmo back to prominence. Terwilliger Ryan and producer Gabriel Kintner launched Snappytoon Productions, beginning a 1930s golden era in which Elmo's adventures—singing, dancing, clowning, and playing his signature instrument, the ukulele—became a major icon of the Great Depression. The character went on to star in Elmo Aardvark's Clubhouse in the 1950s, a TV cartoon series in the 1960s, and the 1978 reboot Elmo and the Aardvarks; rights disputes then kept Elmo out of the spotlight for some years, but Wild Cartoon Kingdom claimed these had been finally resolved. The account concluded with glowing testimonials by various famous names in on the joke, including actors Michele Lee and Anita Page and animated filmmakers Linda Simensky and John Kricfalusi.

The Wild Cartoon Kingdom article series attracted attention from animation fans and industry professionals; according to Gore, many of them initially fell for the joke and believed Elmo Aardvark to be a historical cartoon character. In 1995, Ryan added to the legend of Elmo's historicity, releasing the album Elmo Aardvark: Classic Cartoon Soundtracks; the album brought further interest in the character, with the comedy broadcaster Dr. Demento featuring the album's tracks on his radio show. A sequel, Elmo Aardvark: Vintage Cartoon Soundtracks, followed in 2000.

== Proposed film ==
Shortly after the release of the 1995 Elmo Aardvark album, Ryan was approached by Nickelodeon Movies about starring the Elmo character in a feature film. Ryan and writer Phil Lollar developed a film treatment for a mockumentary tracing Elmo's fictional history as a cartoon character, from pre-film origins to the present day some hundred years later. The mockumentary, potentially titled The Elmo Aardvark Story, would feature live-action interviews with figures who would add historical credibility, such as golden-age animator Ward Kimball; these would be interspersed with clips of the Elmo cartoons that had supposedly been produced through the ages, animated in period-appropriate styles. Designer Leslie Cabarga prepared promotional art, while Fayard Nicholas, Joanie Sommers, and "Weird Al" Yankovic were in talks to contribute to the soundtrack. However, negotiations with Nickelodeon administrators became slow-moving, and after a lengthy "development hell" period, the project fell through.

== Web series ==
In 2000, at the height of a boom in web animation, Ryan created the web series Elmo Aardvark: Outer Space Detective. Produced by Ashley Postlewaite and directed by Darrell Van Citters, founders of the Renegade Animation studio, the series was written by Ryan and Lollar, and featured the voices of Ryan, Lollar, June Foray, Diane Michelle, Corey Burton, and Keith Scott. It was a co-production of Renegade Animation and Will Ryan Productions, syndicated by Mondo Media. To mark the series's release, Animation World Network added even further to the fictional historical legend of Elmo, running an April Fools' Day article that claimed Elmo had long been used as an internet icon, from the early days of ARPANET through ASCII art and experiments by animation innovator Mike Jittlov to the development of Flash animation.

The web series won an Annecy International Animation Film Festival award and an Annie Award for Best Animated Series in an Electronic Medium. Animation historian Harvey Deneroff, founder of the Society for Animation Studies, cited Elmo Aardvark: Outer Space Detective as "one of the best" products of the web animation boom. Ryan released two albums of music related to the series in 2002, and a feature film adaptation was announced as being in development in the early 2000s.

The character returned in 2019 for comic-book stories written by Ryan and Mike Kazaleh and drawn by Milton Knight in the limited-run series The Adventures of Biffle and Shooster.
