= Laurie Main =

Australian actor (1922–2012)

- Photo by Harry Langdon
- Born: Laurence George Main; 29 November 1922; Melbourne, Victoria, Australia
- Died: 8 February 2012 (aged 89); Los Angeles, California, U.S.
- Occupation: Actor
- Years active: 1953–2003

Laurence George "Laurie" Main (29 November 1922 – 8 February 2012) was an Australian actor best known for hosting and narrating the children's series Welcome to Pooh Corner, which aired on The Disney Channel during the 1980s.

Born in Melbourne, Main moved to the UK at the age of 16, making his acting debut in The Yellow Balloon. He emigrated to the United States in 1960, studying with Agnes Moorehead.

His television and film guest appearances include Wagon Train, Alfred Hitchcock Presents, Maverick, I Spy, The Girl from U.N.C.L.E., Get Smart, The Andy Griffith Show, The Three Stooges Go Around the World in a Daze, That Girl, Ironside, The Monkees, Hogan's Heroes, Mayberry R.F.D., The Ghost & Mrs. Muir, Daniel Boone, Family Affair, Bewitched, The Partridge Family, McMillan & Wife, Land of the Lost, Little House on the Prairie, Punky Brewster and Murder, She Wrote. Main also appeared in The Facts of Life Goes to Paris in 1982.

His stage work included The Diary of a Nobody (1954–1955) and Waltz of the Toreadors (1956) in London's West End; and he made several appearances on Broadway.

He also appeared on many television commercials.

Main also did considerable voice work for Disney, having supplied the voice of Dr. Dawson in the 1986 animated film The Great Mouse Detective. He also narrated the animated shorts Winnie the Pooh Discovers the Seasons (1981) and Winnie the Pooh and a Day for Eeyore (1983), as well as serving as the story reader on many Disney Read-Along records, audio cassettes and compact discs.

Main died on 8 February 2012 in Los Angeles, California at the age of 89.

== Filmography ==
- The Yellow Balloon (1953) as Bibulous Customer
- The Master Plan (1955) as Johnny Orwell
- Shop Spoiled (1954) as Coffee Stall Customer
- Delavine Affair (1954) as Summit
- The Adventures of Robin Hood (1956) (TV Series) as Cook
- The New Adventures of Charlie Chan (1958) (TV Series) as Cecil Meadows
- The Whole Truth (1958) as Party Guest
- Fair Game (1958) (TV Series) as George Square
- Sunday Night Theatre (1958–1959) (TV Series) as Mihaly Farkas / Father Looe
- Dow Hour of Great Mysteries (1960) (TV Series) as Connors
- Shirley Temple Theatre (1960) (TV Series) as Archbishop of Canterbury
- The DuPont Show of the Month (1960) (TV Series)
- Maverick (1960–1961) (TV Series) as Crimmins / Marquis of Bognor
- Vanity Fair (1961) (TV Series)
- Bachelor Father (1961) (TV Series) as Beechim
- Wagon Train (1961) (TV Series) as Father Francis Xavier Sweeney
- Alfred Hitchcock Presents (1961) (Season 6 Episode 19: "The Landlady") as Wilkins
- Play of the Week (1961) (TV Series) as Roger Compton
- Jane Eyre (1961) (TV Movie) as St. John Rivers
- Great Ghost Tales (1961) (TV Series) as Sir Robert Tyne
- Alcoa Premiere (1961) (TV Series) as Sergeant Hadley
- Ichabod and Me (1961) (TV Series) as Arthur Barnsdall
- The Dick Powell Theatre (1961) (TV Series) as Harold Elrod
- Hawaiian Eye (1962) (TV Series) as Sir Wilfrid
- The Detectives Starring Robert Taylor (1962) (TV series) as Colonel Driscoll
- The Phantom of the Opera (1962) as Forbes (uncredited)
- The Punch and Judy Man (1963) as 2nd Drunk
- The Three Stooges Go Around the World in a Daze (1963) as Carruthers (uncredited)
- The DuPont Show of the Week (1963) (TV Series) as J.T. Cooper
- The Third Man (1963–1965) (TV Series) as Dennis Nesbit
- Daniel Boone (1964) (TV Series) as Benjamin Franklin
- The Jack Benny Program (1964) (TV Series) as Dr. Granger
- I'd Rather Be Rich (1964) as Harrison
- My Fair Lady (1964) as Hoxton Man Not Hoston (uncredited)
- Honey West (1965) (TV Series) as Antoine
- Munster, Go Home! (1966) as Minor Role (uncredited)
- I Spy (1966) (TV Series) as Luchesi
- The Girl from U.N.C.L.E. (1966) (TV Series) as Shah Karum
- Hogan's Heroes (1966–1969) (TV Series) as Air Marshal Woodhouse / Colonel Wembley / Major Shawcross / Colonel Franz
- Get Smart (1967) (TV Series) as Dr. Ramsey
- The Scorpio Letters (1967) (TV Movie) as Tyson
- The Andy Griffith Show (1967) (TV Series) as Robling Flask
- The Iron Horse (1967) (TV Series) as Father Jean Louis
- That Girl (1967) (TV Series) as Grimsley / Maitre D'
- Bewitched (1967–1971) (TV series) as Tour Guide / Guide / Francis
- The Guns of Will Sonnett (1968) (TV Series) as Judge
- Ironside (1968) (TV Series) as Harris
- The Monkees (1968) (TV Series) as Mr. Friar
- Family Affair (1968–1970) (TV Series) as Mr. Edgemont / Passenger / Mr. Smyser
- Target: Harry (1969) as Simon Scott
- Mayberry R.F.D. (1969) (TV Series) as Thornton Avery
- The Ghost & Mrs. Muir (1970) (TV Series) as Nero
- Daniel Boone (1965–1970) (TV Series) as Stinch / Sir Samuel Peacham / Benjamin Franklin
- On a Clear Day You Can See Forever (1970) as Lord Percy
- Darling Lili (1970) as French General
- Night Chase (1970) (TV Movie) as Tout
- Cat Ballou (1971) (TV Movie) as Land Developer
- The Doris Day Show (1971) (TV Series) as Father Kingsley
- Private Parts (1972) as Reverend Moon
- The Partridge Family (1972) (TV Series) as Frederic La Forge
- McMillan & Wife (1973) (TV Series) as Alfie
- The Strongest Man in the World (1975) as Mr. Reedy
- My Father's House (1975) (TV Movie) as Food Editor
- Land of the Lost (1976) (TV Series) as William Blandings
- Freaky Friday (1976) as Mr. Mills
- Herbie Goes to Monte Carlo (1977) as Duval
- Five Weeks in a Balloon (1977) (TV Movie) (voice)
- Black Beauty (1978) (TV movie) as Farmer Grey / Squire Douglas Gordon / Pipe Smoking Stable Owner (voice)
- Time After Time (1979) as Inspector Gregson
- ABC Weekend Specials (1979) (TV Series) as Reggie
- The Competition (1980) as Judge Wyeth
- CBS Children's Mystery Theatre (1980) (TV Series) as Dr. Watson
- Tarzan, the Ape Man (1981) as Club Member (voice)
- Winnie the Pooh Discovers the Seasons (1981) (Short) as Narrator (voice)
- Little House on the Prairie (1981) (TV Series) as Major Guffey
- The Facts of Life Goes to Paris (1982) (TV Movie) as Reggie
- Winnie the Pooh and a Day for Eeyore (1983) (Short) as Narrator (voice)
- Casablanca (1983) (TV Series) as Wilf Parker
- Welcome to Pooh Corner (1983) (TV Series) (Narrator)
- Monchhichis (1983) (TV series) (voice)
- Cheech & Chong's The Corsican Brothers (1984) as Narrator
- Dumbo's Circus (1985) (TV Series) (voice)
- My Chauffeur (1986) as Jenkins
- The Great Mouse Detective (1986) as Dr. Watson (archive sound)
- Punky Brewster (1988) (TV series) as Announcer
- The New Yogi Bear Show (1988) (TV series) (voice)
- Wicked Stepmother (1989) as Client
- Paddington Bear (1989–1990) (TV Series) (voice)
- Rover Dangerfield (1991) (voice)
- Murder, She Wrote (1992) (TV Series) as Man
- Mom and Dad Save the World (1992) as Chorus Master
- Robin Hood: Men in Tights (1993) as Wedding Guest
- The Thief and the Cobbler (1993) as The Brigand
- Piglet's Big Game (2003) as the Narrator
