= Will Ryan =

American voice actor and musician (1949–2021)

- Born: William Ryan; May 21, 1949; Cleveland, Ohio, U.S.
- Died: November 19, 2021 (aged 72); Santa Monica, California, U.S.
- Occupations: Voice actor; musician; singer
- Years active: 1966–2021
- Spouse: Nancy Niparko
- Musical career
- Genres: Country; holiday
- Instruments: Vocals; guitar; ukulele
- Formerly of: Will Ryan & the Cactus County Cowboys

Will Ryan (May 21, 1949 – November 19, 2021) was an American voice actor, musician and singer. He provided the voice of Petrie in the 1988 animated film The Land Before Time. He was also known for his voice work as Eugene Meltsner in the Christian radio drama Adventures in Odyssey and Grubby in The Adventures of Teddy Ruxpin. Ryan was also the creator of Elmo Aardvark, a character that served as a pastiche of early animated cartoon stars, in 1993.

== Life and career ==
Ryan was born on May 21, 1949, and grew up in Cleveland, Ohio. He became established by singing about the American West. In summer 1966, Ryan's earlier band, Wead, played a gig in Wellington, Ohio.

In late 1970s, he teamed up with Phil Baron as Willio and Phillio. They had regular gigs on television, radio and comedy clubs and universities throughout the U.S.. They later paired up again voicing characters of best friends Teddy Ruxpin (Baron) and Grubby the Octopede (Ryan) in the Teddy Ruxpin book and tape series as well as the 1986–87 television show The Adventures of Teddy Ruxpin. In August 2002, Willio and Phillio returned to Cleveland for two performances at historic Cain Park and another at the famed Beachland Ballroom. At the Cain Park show, friend Alec Nordstrom of Hudson was invited onstage. Cleveland's revered rock critic and "world's oldest teenager," Jane Scott, attended and reviewed the Beachland performance for the Cleveland Plain Dealer. The Willio and Phillio act brought Ryan back into music and after moving to California, he began to write and record songs for The Walt Disney Company.

Willio and Phillio performed "I Wish it Could Be Christmas All Year Long" on a Disney Christmas album in a voice similar to Micky Dolenz of The Monkees.

He provided the voices of Rabbit and Tigger, and the singing voice of Eeyore, in the Disney Channel's long-running series Welcome to Pooh Corner and in many other Pooh cartoons. He also provided the voice of Barnaby the Dog on the popular series Dumbo's Circus.

In 1987, Ryan became a fixture of the radio drama Adventures in Odyssey, as Eugene Meltsner, Harlow Doyle, David Harley, Patrick O'Ryan, and over 100 individual characters. He voiced Rabbit in Winnie the Pooh and a Day for Eeyore, Digit in An American Tail, Petrie in The Land Before Time, and Willie the Giant in Mickey's Christmas Carol. He continued to do voice work. In 2009, he was working on the third season of Mickey Mouse Clubhouse, the 21st season of Adventures in Odyssey, and the new radio series of Will Ryan's Cactus County Round-Up which featured his band The Cactus County Cowboys. In the Family Guy episode "Road to the North Pole", he provided the voice for Winnie-the-Pooh. As a side project, with Andrew J. Lederer and Michael Rosenberg (Jackie Diamond), Will Ryan briefly performed in the '20s-style music and comedy trio The Merry Metronomes. He and Lederer also appeared from time to time as a duo, usually under the name The Natty Nabobs. He and Nick Santa Maria also performed occasionally as a vaudeville-era comedy team, Biffle & Shooster (Ryan played the latter); and in 2013 they made their first film, a faux 1930s comedy short titled It's a Frame-Up!.

Beginning on January 28, 2021, until his death Will was the co-host of the "Tell Ya Later" show on YouTube with longtime friend and co-star Katie Leigh. The final episode featuring Ryan during his lifetime premiered on November 15, 2021, 4 days before his death. There is still unreleased footage recorded before he died that will air posthumously.

== Personal life ==
Ryan was married to Nancy Niparko.

=== Death ===
Ryan died from pancreatic cancer on November 19, 2021, at the age of 72.

== Selected filmography ==
=== Film ===
- Mickey's Christmas Carol – Mole, Willie the Giant, Pete, Big Bad Wolf, Weasel #2 (1983)
- Frog and Toad Are Friends – Frog (1985)
- An American Tail – Digit (1986)
- Frog and Toad Together – Frog (1987)
- The Land Before Time – Petrie (1988)
- Stanley and the Dinosaurs – (1989)
- Morris Goes to School – Morris, The Fisherman, and The Candyman (1989)
- The Little Mermaid – Harold, the seahorse (1989)
- Rock-a-Doodle – Stuey (1991)
- Mouse Soup – The Weasel (1992)
- Morris Has a Cold – Morris (1993)
- Thumbelina – Hero, Reverend Rat, Goat (1994)
- Three Little Pigs Sing a Gig – Lippy Pig (1994)
- A Troll in Central Park – Boss, Guard (1994)
- The Pebble and the Penguin – Royal, Tika (1995)
- Looney Tunes: Back in Action – Papa Bear (2003)
- Get a Horse! – Peg-Leg Pete (2013)
- It's a Frame-Up! – Sam Shooster (2013)
- The Biffle Murder Case – Sam Shooster (2015)
- Bride of Finklestein – Sam Shooster (2015)
- Schmo Boat – Sam Shooster (2015)
- Imitation of Wife – Sam Shooster (2015)

=== Radio ===
- Adventures in Odyssey – Eugene Meltsner (1987–2000, 2005–2022)

=== Television ===
- Welcome to Pooh Corner – Rabbit, Tigger (1983)
- Cap'n O. G. Readmore's Jack and the Beanstalk - Wordsy (1985)
- Dumbo's Circus – Barnaby (1985)
- Wuzzles – Additional Voices (1985)
- Disney's Adventures of the Gummi Bears – Additional Voices (1985–1991)
- The Adventures of Teddy Ruxpin – Grubby, Louie (1986–1987)
- Sport Goofy in Soccermania – Scrooge McDuck, Beagle Boys and Gyro Gearloose (1987)
- The Mother Goose Video Treasury – Bertram the Goose (1987)
- DuckTales – Pete/Sharkey, Dangerous Dan (1987)
- Cap'n O. G. Readmore's Puss in Boots – François (1988)
- Garfield and Friends (episode 88 "Ghost of a Chance", as McKraven (or McCraven) The Ghost) (1992)
- Sing Me a Story with Belle (episode 9 "Problem Solving: Ingenuity" as Willie the Giant) ()
- Saban's Adventures of Oliver Twist – Mr. Bumble (1996–1997)
- Courage the Cowardly Dog – The Duck Brothers (1999–2000)
- House of Mouse – Willie the Giant (2001–2003)
- Hi Hi Puffy AmiYumi – Farmer Zeke, Alien Banana #1, Wall, Rumaki, Old Camper 3, Wasabi, Sumo Wrestler, Muscle Bound Guy, Defensive End and Riptide's Coach (2004–2006)
- Mickey Mouse Clubhouse – Willie the Giant (2006–2016)
- Family Guy (episode Road to the North Pole) – Winnie the Pooh (2010)
- Mickey Mouse Funhouse (2 episodes "Mickey and the Cornstalk/King Mickey"/"Bottled Up/Minnie's Fairytale" as Willie the Giant) (2021) (final performances)

== Discography ==
- Eugene Sings!
- Eugene Sings! Christmas
- Am I Cool or What?
- Goin' Quackers
- Elmo Aardvark: Outer Space Detective!
- Elmo Aardvark: Vintage Cartoon Sound Tracks
- Elmo Aardvark: Classic Cartoon Soundtracks
- Classic Songs for Leonard Reed's Shim Sham Shimmy
- Adventures in Odyssey (Eugene Meltsner/Harlow Doyle)
- Frosty's First Adventure
- Frosty
- Frosty the Snowman

== Sources ==
- Credits for album, Am I Cool or What? featuring Ryan compositions, Answers.com, Retrieved on February 10, 2008.
- Interview with Ryan The Phantom Tollbooth, Retrieved on March 26, 2008.
- List of Walt Disney Records artists Mouse Tracks The Story of Walt Disney Records, Retrieved on April 24, 2008.
