= Christmas store =

Retail store specializing in Christmas supplies

Note that this page only includes information on Christmas stores in the United States

A Christmas store is a retail store specializing in Christmas supplies, especially decorations.

== Overview ==
In the United States, many Christmas stores operate only seasonally in the month or two before the Christmas holidays, perhaps set up in otherwise vacant shopping mall space. Some Christmas stores operate year-round.

Examples of items that feature prominently in Christmas stores include nutcrackers, angel figures, and holiday-related stuffed animals. Supplies like wrapping implements, themed kitchen and serving ware, outdoor lights, specialized decoration storage, and seasonally scented candles. Many Christmas stores also feature displays to entertain visitors such as model trains, miniature Christmas villages, and fake falling snow indoors. Themes of these stores frequently refer to Nordic and German Christmas motifs, Santa Claus and related imagery (elves, reindeer, sleighs, cookies, etc.), and the North Pole, which is said in stories to be the home of Santa Claus.

The popularization of Christmas stores is associated with the commercialization of Christmas.

== Notable Examples ==
- Bronner's, a year-round Christmas store and tourist attraction in Frankenmuth, Michigan
- Christmas Tree Shops, a chain of stores that permanently closed all locations in 2023.
- The Incredible Christmas Place, which claims to be the "Largest Christmas store in the South."

== See also ==
- Pop-up retail
- Economics of Christmas
