= Ray Erlenborn =

American actor (1915–2007)

- Born: January 21, 1915; Denver, Colorado, U.S.
- Died: June 4, 2007 (aged 92); West Hills, California, U.S.
- Occupations: Actor, sound effects artist
- Years active: 1923–1989
- Spouse(s): Margret Lenhart (divorced); Meredith Erlenborn (m. ?–2007; his death)
- Children: 3

Ray Erlenborn (January 21, 1915 – June 4, 2007) was an American vaudevillian actor and sound effects artist. He is also known to audiences as the voice of Rabbit from Winnie the Pooh Discovers the Seasons. He also did sound effects for Carol Burnett, Maude, Sonny and Cher and the original Dr. Dolittle animal sound effects.

== Death ==
Erlenborn died at his home in West Hills, California at the age of 92 as a result of a bacterial infection.

== Filmography ==
- Criminals Within (1941)
