= Snow Baby =

Small figurine

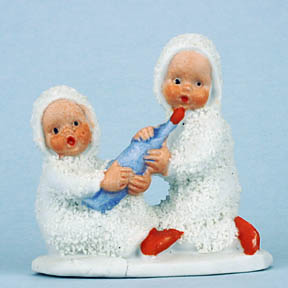
A 1920s 2-inch snow baby piece

A Snow Baby (or Snowbaby) is a small figurine, usually of a child, that depicts some aspect of the Christmas holidays or of winter sports. The traditional snow baby is made of unglazed biscuit porcelain (or bisque) and shows a child dressed in a snowsuit; the suit itself is covered in small pieces of crushed bisque, giving the appearance of fallen snowflakes. Figurines of other characters were also made, including Santa Claus, elves and animals such as penguins and polar bears.

The oldest Snow Babies were manufactured in Germany in the 1890s, and were typically either all white with a painted face, or painted in pastel colors. With the onset of World War I, production stopped; when it resumed after the war ended, the snow babies were less finely detailed in their porcelain and finish. In the 1920s, Japanese manufacturers began to produce Snow Baby replicas, though they were generally of a lesser quality than those made in Germany. In the late 1980s an American company called Department 56 began producing a new line of Snow Babies in Taiwan.

== History ==
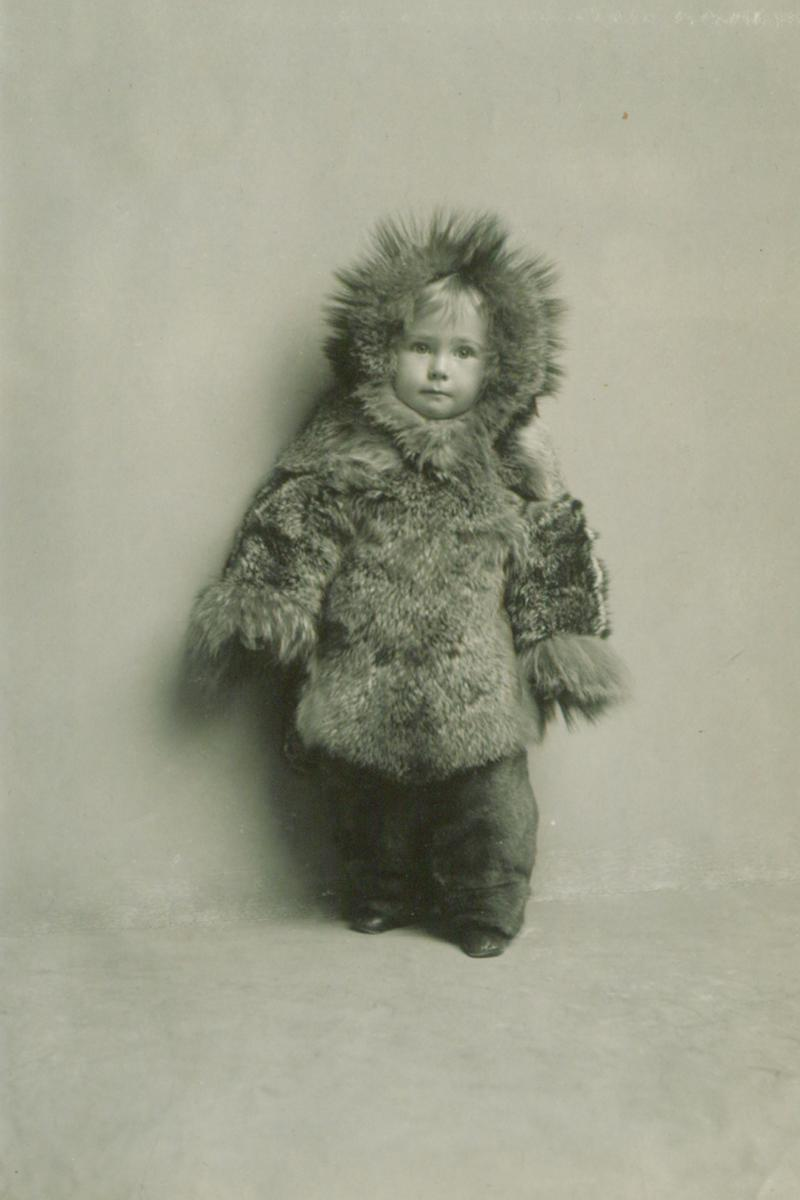
Marie Ahnighito Peary c. 1895

Snow Babies were created as reusable cake toppers in the 1890s by Johann Moll, a German confectioner, based on early nineteenth-century sugar dolls used as Christmas decorations. They were originally manufactured by Hertwig and Company, but other porcelain factories in Germany began creating the figurines soon after.

The release of the Snow Baby figurines coincided with the birth of Admiral Robert Peary's daughter in Greenland while he was on an expedition to the North Pole in 1893. She was the first non-indigenous baby to be born that far north (13 degrees south of the pole), earning her the nickname "snow baby" from the Inuit. The public's fascination with Marie and the discovery of the North Pole in 1909 helped popularize the figurines.

Snow Babies were initially only sold in Germany, but in the 1900s German manufacturers began exporting them to England and the United States. Between 1900 and 1930, Snow Babies grew in popularity in England where they were used as cake decorations, and the United States where they were featured in women's magazines for use as Christmas decorations.

Production of the figurines in Germany was halted during World War I so that the factories could contribute to the war effort, and resumed when the war was over. In the 1930s under the direction of the Shackman Company in NYC, Japanese manufacturers began producing reproductions of Snow Babies. Although the Japanese figurines had less detail than the German Snow Babies, they were able to grow a market because of the post-war anti-German sentiment.

German manufacturing of Snow Babies stopped again at the start of World War II, and American demand for the product dropped. For a short time after the war was over, Snow Babies were manufactured in the United States and England. However, the figurines were low quality, and the run was unsuccessful.

Snow Babies had a resurgence in popularity in 1987, when the American company Department 56 began to manufacture replicas of the original Snow Baby designs.

== Design ==
Snow Babies are small figurines made from slipcast porcelain depicting a child dressed in a one-piece snowsuit. The hardened porcelain is coated with slip containing grog to imitate the texture of snow, which is then was fired and painted.

=== Pre-World War I ===
Before World War I, Snow Babies ranged from 5 to 7 inches in size and depicted children participating in winter activities like skiing, ice skating, and sledding. The figurines had highly detailed faces, and the paint was fired onto the porcelain so that the color would be longer-lasting. Figurines were made with different pastel colors of grout, and some were left all white except for face painting. Porcelain Snow Baby dolls and jointed figurines were also manufactured, as were Snow Babies attached as decoration on planters, boxes, and candles.

=== Post-World War I ===
When Snow Baby production resumed after the war, the figurines made were smaller, usually ranging from 1 to 3 inches in size. Although the new paint used came in vibrant primary colors, Snow Babies had less facial detail than previous models; the paint was also less durable and prone to flaking off. Models in more varied poses were made, including children singing Christmas carols, riding polar bears, and building snowmen. New characters were also designed, and included Santa Claus, elves, penguins, and dogs.

== See also ==
- Christmas ornament
