= Gund =

American manufacturer of plush stuffed animals

Gund Manufacturing Company
- Type: Subsidiary
- Founded: 1898; 128 years ago in New York City, U.S.
- Founder: Adolf Gund
- Headquarters: Edison, New Jersey U.S.
- Area served: Worldwide
- Key people: Bruce Raiffe (president)
- Parent: Spin Master
- Website: www.gund.com

Gund Manufacturing Company is an American manufacturer of plush stuffed animals. The company is based in Edison, New Jersey, and distributes throughout the United States and Canada as well as in Europe, Japan, Australia, and South America. Gund is currently run by third generation family owner Bruce Raiffe whose grandfather Jacob Swedlin purchased the company from the original founder (Adolph Gund) in 1925. Their slogan is "Gotta Getta Gund".

The company is best known for its line of teddy bears, and holds or has held licensing agreements with franchises and companies such as Sesame Street, Peter Rabbit, Curious George, Studio Ghibli, Hello Kitty/Sanrio, PAW Patrol, and Toca Boca. It has won multiple awards during its 120+ years and was also the face of a United States Postal Service stamp. Gund is headquartered in Edison, New Jersey and currently a division of Spin Master, which acquired the company from Enesco in March 2018. In the 1980s, China became one of Gund's primary sources for stuffed toys.

== History ==
=== 1898–1925: Formation through retirement of Adolf Gund ===
Progression of Gund logos from inception through 2016.

Gund was founded in 1898 by Adolf Gund. He was born in Germany and resided in Norwalk, Connecticut before settling in New York City. He started Gund as a small toy and novelty company which was incorporated under the name Gund Manufacturing Company in 1910. In the early years, Gund used GEE as the company slogan in advertising on product labels. Gund produced its first products in loft factories around New York City. It moved from location to location as it expanded, starting off on Third Avenue and eventually moving to Ninth Street by 1922. The moves were all prompted by the need for larger manufacturing quarters.

In the early 1900s, Gund received numerous patents that introduced various mechanisms into plush toys. Once such patent was for what was described as a "springing dog." The design called for a mechanism to be placed inside the stuffed animal which would cause it to jump, "bringing it to life." Another patent was for a walking mechanism which allowed the plush to walk. One of the company's most notable patents was for a "ride-on duck" which was a duck for children to ride on. It had wheels that operated a working duck bill which moved up and down as the wheels turned. The ride-on duck was produced by Gund for approximately 10 years commencing in 1912. Gund also secured many other patents for toys such as the wind-up walking plush, dancing toys, and walking toys.

Gund created many of the industry standards in its early years, including safety standards and the manufacturing processes for toys. It continued to market its products under the moniker GEE up until the late 1920s, as evidenced in various advertisements in Playthings and other toy magazines. The company was eventually sold when Adolf Gund retired in 1925.

=== 1925–1968: New ownership and expansion ===
During the early years of the company, Adolf Gund was the mentor to Jacob Swedlin, a Russian immigrant who came to the United States in 1907. Gund taught Swedlin to become a cutter and pattern maker, teaching him the ins and outs of the company. When Gund retired in 1925, he sold the company to Swedlin for $1,500. Swedlin brought his brothers Abe and John on board with the company, which began rapid expansion. Jacob oversaw design and production, Abe acted as the chief financial officer, and John ran sales and promotions.

Some of the most notable Gund products in the 1930s included its line of Easter Bunnies which continue to be one of its most popular products. It also introduced "puppy purses," a stuffed animal dog that doubled as a purse. Gund also became the first licensor of cartoon characters, producing plush toy versions of Popeye, Mickey Mouse, Felix the Cat, and Tigger. Its relationship with The Walt Disney Company began in 1947 and contributed to expansion of Gund. The deal with Disney allowed Gund to supply every major toy retailer in the United States with licensed Disney merchandise.

In the 1940s, Gund received trade mark registrations for two versions of its logos, both of which can be seen on its products during that time. One of the logos was a lower-case "g" with bunny ears which became synonymous with the company and its products. The popularity of the logo sparked the creation of a new plush character known as "Gundy." Gundy became the company mascot and grew into merchandising that included the "Gund Club."

During World War II in the early 1940s, Gund did not manufacture its products according to prior demand. To support the war effort, Gund only offered its products on a quota allotment. It also produced a doll in an army uniform as its way to encourage the purchase of war bonds. After the war, Gund began rapid expansion, releasing new products, including many new Disney characters in conjunction with the opening of Disneyland in California in 1955. It moved into a new manufacturing center in Brooklyn in 1957, a location that would produce its toys until 1974.

=== 1969–1990: Further expansion and the Raiffe family ===
By 1969, Gund had become dependent on its licensing agreement with Disney for the majority of its business. Herbert Raiffe, the son-in-law of John Swedlin, became the company president in 1969 after Swedlin's passing. Raiffe began moving Gund away from its licensing agreements and shifted the focus to internal design. The company launched new products that included the "Bag Full of Laughs," a sound mechanism placed in a fabric sack and sewn into a plush.

During the 1970s, Gund expanded its product line by releasing toys and plush popular in other countries. This included beanies and Gonk toys. In 1972, Gund was able to expand again thanks to Ling-Ling and Hsing-Hsing, two panda bears gifted to the United States from China as part of that country's panda diplomacy efforts. The plush industry had a huge demand for panda stuffed animals, with Gund leading the way with manufacturing and distribution. Raiffe was credited by publications such as Forbes for Gund marketing efforts of the bears.

The 1980s brought about one of Gund's most prominent branding campaigns, known as "Gotta Getta Gund." The campaign is credited as making Gund one of the most recognized toy companies in the United States. During this decade, Gund also expanded its offering of stuffed bears, releasing its collectible series of bears called the Signature Collection. Each bear was signed by Rita Raiffe, Gund's Director of Design, and sold in limited quantities. In 1986 it released 60 new items, the most ever since the company was formed.

=== 1990–2014: 100th anniversary and postage stamp ===
In 1990, Gund appeared before a US Senate committee to lobby for extending most favoured nation (MFN) status to China, stating "the MFN duty status that China has enjoyed enabled China to become one of Gund's primary sources for stuffed toys".

In 1993, Bruce Raiffe became President of Gund. Prior to that time he served as the company's Marketing Director and later Vice President.

Gund celebrated its 100th anniversary in 1998. As part of the celebration, Gund auctioned off a 100th anniversary bear which raised $100,000 for four children's charities. The bear was one-of-a-kind and purchased by Yoshihiro Sekiguchi who placed it in one of three Teddy bear museums he owned in Japan. It was the 100th anniversary of the Theodore Roosevelt "teddy bear" that brought about Gund's next milestone. In 2002, the United States Postal Service used a 1948 teddy bear of Gund to grace a 37 cent stamp in honor of the event.

Gund entered into a licensing agreement with Sesame Street in 2003.

=== 2008–present: Purchase by Enesco and beyond ===
Gund was purchased by Enesco, the giftware manufacturer best known for its line of Precious Moments figurines. Gund joined Enesco's other recently purchased brands which included Boyds Bears, Our Name is Mud, philoSphie's and Jubilee Art. Bruce Raiffe remained with the company on a consultant type basis, but returned in 2011 when he was again appointed president of Gund.

Gund continued to take on new licensing agreements after being purchased by Enesco. One of the most notable was that for the Uglydolls line of plush toys, which it signed in 2012. The same year it signed an agreement for Boo, the World's Cutest Dog. It also added Grumpy Cat in 2013 and Pusheen in 2014.

Gund went through rebranding in late 2015. It included a redesigned logo that reflects its signature plush toys. This new identity system was designed by a NYC-based digital branding agency Cynda Media Lab, and it received several national and international design awards, including 2016 Communication Arts Design Annual Award, 2017 HOW Logo Design Award, 2017 iF Design Award, and 2017 A'Design Award. It also released more than 200 new items as part of its 2016 campaign. It was in late 2015 that Enesco was purchased by private equity fund Balmoral Funds.

Gund's most recent campaign is for a charitable cause that involves "giving huggable joy to children in need," and incorporating social media with the hashtag #howdoyouhug.

== Products ==
Gund is the manufacturer of plush stuffed animals. It sells over 1500 products including Gund, Baby Gund, Gund Bears, Gund Snuffles teddy bears, and Gund Holiday. Gund is known for under-stuffing their products to make them softer than competing teddy bears. One of Gund's most popular bears is Snuffles, a plush the company launched in 1981. Snuffles was one of the first plushes to contain soft stuffing, which began a trend in the industry. "Snuffles has been a beloved Gund teddy bear for over 30 years, with its popular crescent moon design." Some of Gund's popular products include Philbin, Peek-a-boo bear, Spunky, My First Teddy, and Sesame Street Elmo. GUND also makes Pusheen Plushies available at Pusheen.com.

== Awards and recognition ==
Gund has received numerous awards throughout the company history, including multiple Tillywig awards and American International Toy Fair awards.

- 2016 Tillywig Award: Sleepy Seas Soothing Turtle
- 2016 Top Fun Tillywig Award: Flappy the Elephant
- 2016 Top Fun Tillywig Award: Rock A Bye Bear
- 2015 TOBY Industry Choice Award: Big Boe
- 2015 TOBY Industry Choice Award: Hubis
- 2015 TOBY People's Choice Award: Big Boe
- 2014 TOBY Industry Choice Award: Cannoli Cream
