= Boo (dog) =

Pomeranian that became an Internet sensation

- Species: Canis lupus familiaris
- Breed: Pomeranian
- Sex: Male
- Born: March 16, 2006; San Francisco Bay Area, California, U.S.
- Died: January 18, 2019 (aged 12); Buena Park, California, U.S.
- Years active: 2008–2019
- Known for: being "World's cutest dog"
- Owner: Irene Ahn

Boo (March 16, 2006 – January 18, 2019) was a Pomeranian dog that had a popular Facebook page and was the subject of four photo-books. As of 2020, Boo had 16 million likes on Facebook. Boo was owned by Irene Ahn, a Facebook employee, who was also the owner of Boo's older brother, Buddy.

== Popularity ==
Boo belonged to a San Francisco-based Facebook employee who created a Facebook page for the dog with the statement "My name is Boo. I am a dog. Life is good." He became popular in October 2010 after singer Kesha sent a tweet that she had a new boyfriend, linking to the page.

Chronicle Books, noticing that Boo had 5 million Facebook fans at the time, approached the owner to write a picture book. In August 2011, Boo: The Life of the World's Cutest Dog, written by his owner under the pen name J. H. Lee, was published. The book was eventually published in ten languages. A second book followed, Boo: Little Dog in the Big City, as well as a calendar and plans for a cut-out book and additional children's books. His other merchandise includes a Gund stuffed animal.

== Media appearances ==
In April 2012, Boo was the subject of a death hoax after #RIPBOO appeared all over Facebook. Tweets followed as Gizmodo writer Sam Biddle tweeted that Boo had died. It was later confirmed by the Chronicle Book staff that Boo was alive and well.

In July 2012, Boo was named the Official Pet Liaison of Virgin America, which featured photos of him in an airplane alongside advice for people traveling with pets. He also modeled sunglasses for The Monocle Order, from the Blood and Tears line.

Mike Isaac of All Things Digital outed Boo's owner as Irene Ahn, a Facebook employee, in August 2012.

== Health complications and death ==
Boo's owners said he began to show signs of heart trouble after Buddy's death; he died in his sleep on the morning of January 18, 2019.

== See also ==
- List of individual dogs
