= Bronner's Christmas Wonderland =

Retail store in Frankenmuth, Michigan

Coordinates: 43°18′50″N 83°44′13″W

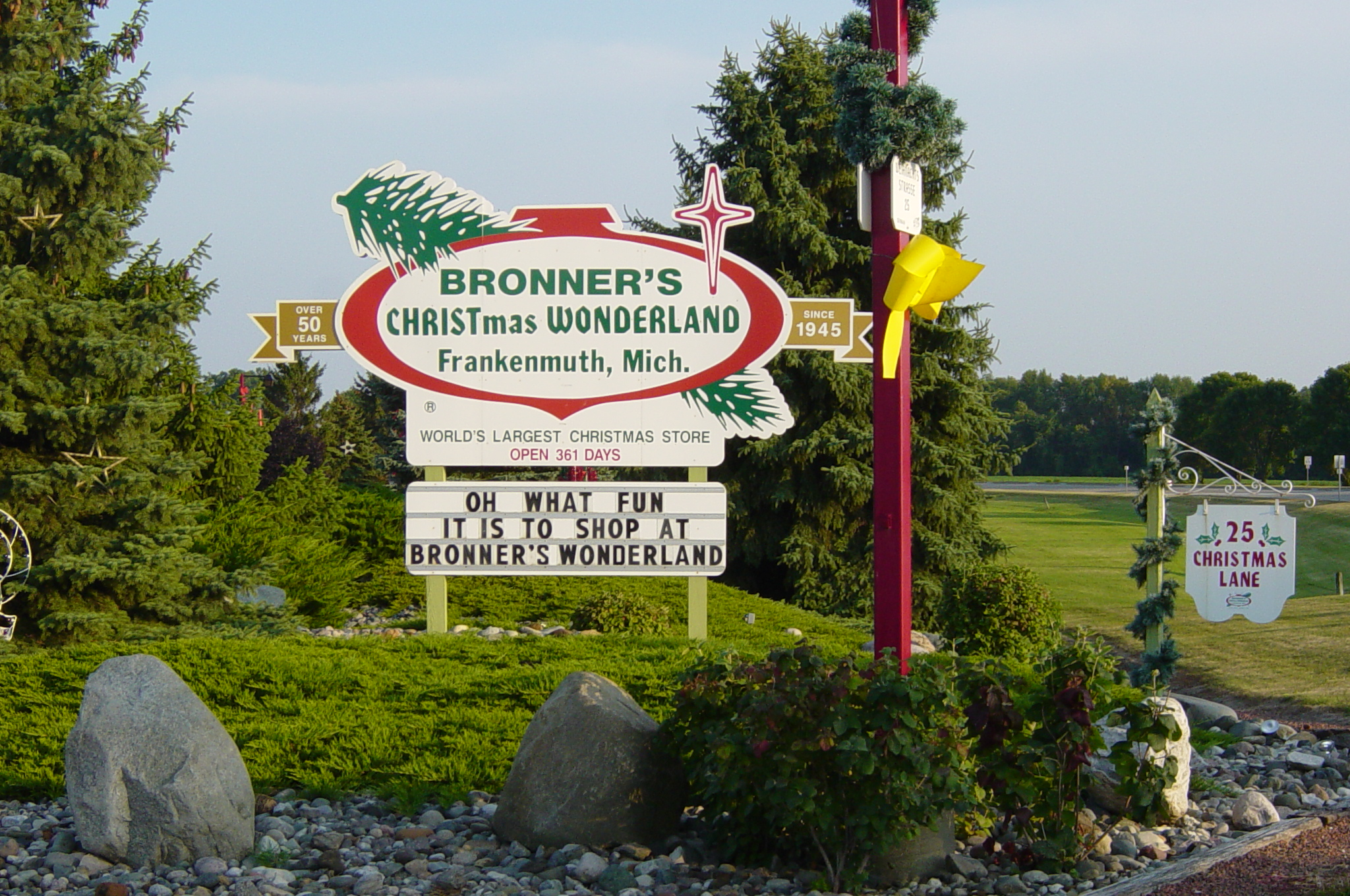
Sign at the entrance to Christmas Lane

Bronner's Christmas Wonderland (stylized BRONNER'S CHRISTmas WONDERLAND) is a retail store in Frankenmuth, Michigan, that promotes itself as the "World's Largest Christmas Store".

Designed with an Alpine architecture (see chalet), the building is 7.35 acres (2.97 ha) in size with landscaped grounds covering 27 acres (11 ha). Outside the entrance are three 17-foot-tall (5.2 m) outdoor Santa Claus's and a 15-foot-tall (4.6 m) snowman. Inside the store, there are approximately 800 animated figurines. Some 100,000 lights illuminate Bronner's one-half-mile-long (0.80 km) Christmas Lane. Michigan designated Bronner's as an "Embassy for Michigan Tourism" in 1976. Bronner's employs over 500 people during the holiday season (between October and Christmas).

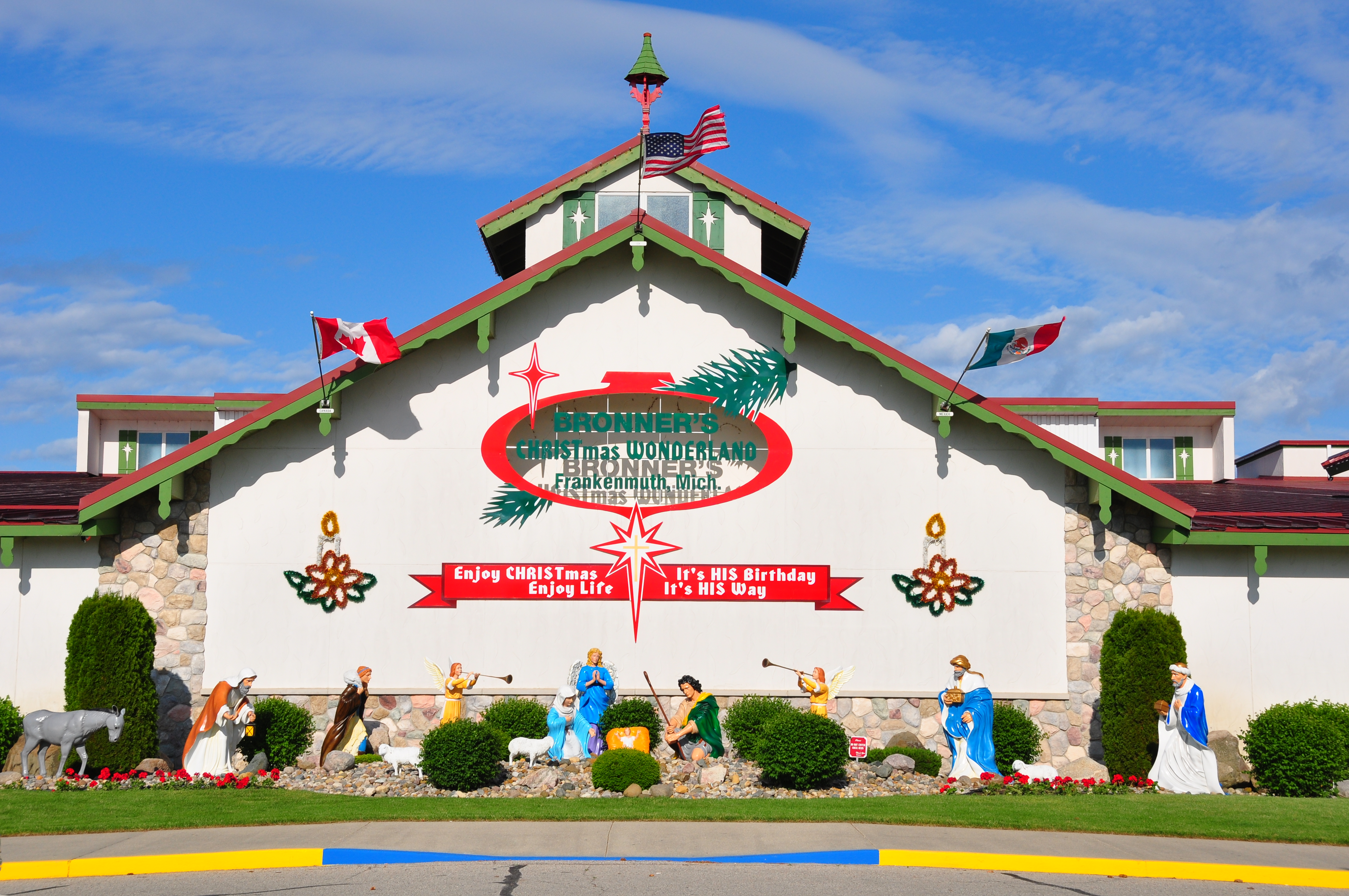
The west entrance to Bronner's Christmas Wonderland

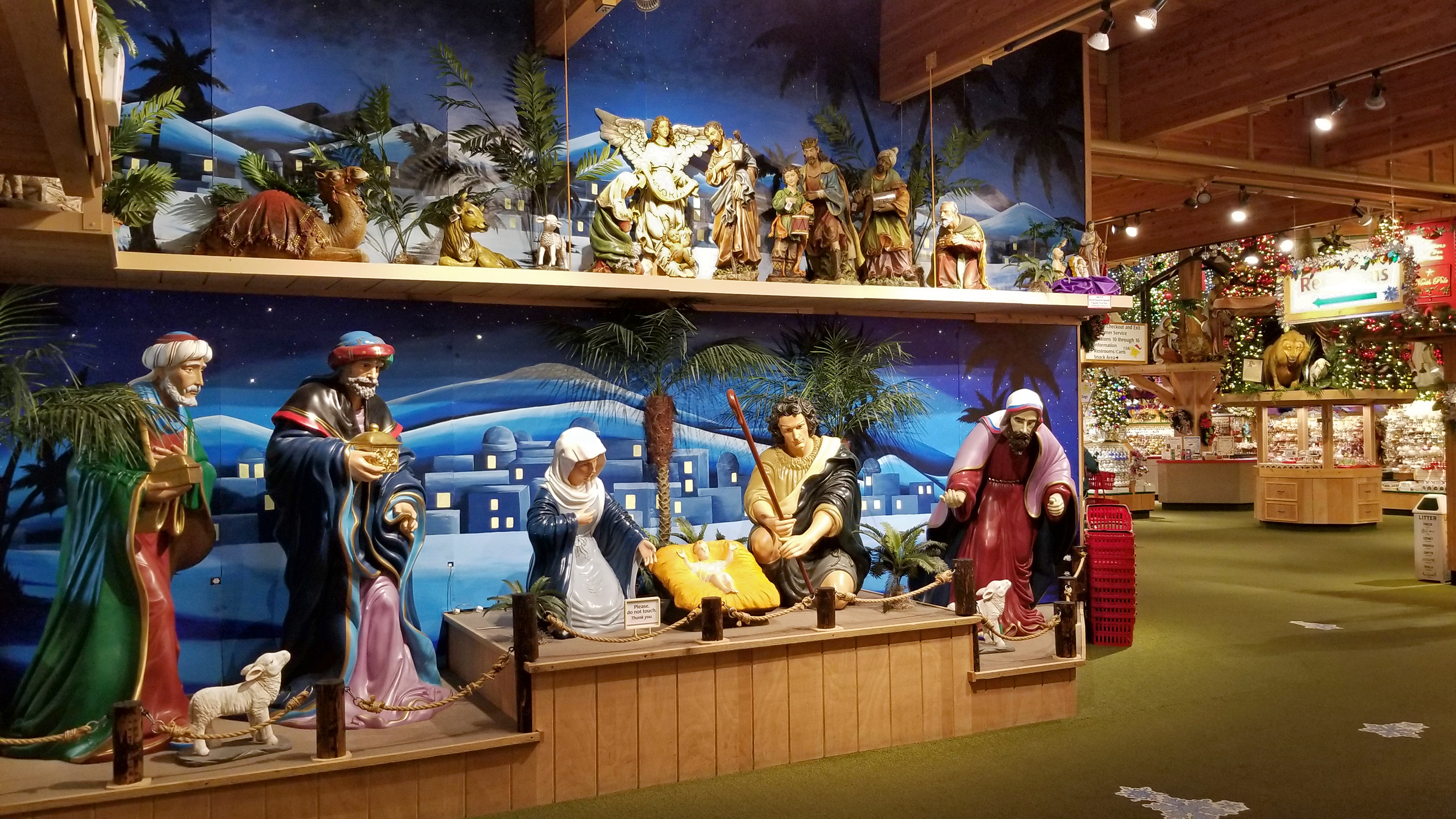
Tableau at the west entrance (June 2019)

Founded in 1945 by Wally Bronner, Bronner's Christmas Wonderland is visited annually by over two million people, with the weekend after Thanksgiving being the busiest of the year with over 50,000 visitors. Its inventory exceeds 50,000 items, including Christmas ornaments, artificial Christmas trees, Christmas lights, Nativity scenes, Christmas decorations, collectibles, and similar goods. Each year, approximately 600,000 glass ornaments, 530,000 feet (160,000 m) of garland, 150,000 postcards and 86,000 light sets (nearly 530 miles [850 km] of light cords) are sold. Bronner's has the exclusive right to sell Precious Moments Christmas-themed figurines.

With the government of Austria's permission and in keeping with the German theme of Frankenmuth itself, Bronner's built a replica of the Oberndorf, Austria, Silent Night Memorial Chapel in 1992 as a tribute to the Christmas hymn "Silent Night".

Wally Bronner, 81, died on April 1, 2008.

Bronner's was vandalized on Christmas Day in 2010, with some 75 store displays damaged or destroyed. Five men pleaded guilty to the crime, which involved an estimated $40,000 in damage.

In 2018, there were over 350 decorated Christmas trees inside and products from 70 countries in the 320,000 square foot building.

Irene Bronner died on October 16, 2022, at the age of 95.
