= Christmas village =

Decorative, miniature-scale village

A Department 56 New England Series village display.

A Christmas village (or putz) is a decorative, miniature-scale village often set up during the Christmas season. These villages are rooted in the elaborate Christmas traditions of the Moravian Church, a Protestant denomination. In the tradition of the Moravian Church, nativity scenes have been the center of the Christmas putz, which is "built to tell the Good News of the coming of the Christ Child" and "is the Gospel in miniature from Isaiah’s prophecy and Mary’s annunciation to the visit of the wisemen and the flight into Egypt." For Moravian Christians, the nativity scene serves to celebrate "the story of the wonder of Christ’s birth so that the Son of God can be welcomed into the hearts of the home at the Christmas." Mass-produced cardboard Christmas villages became popular in the United States during the early and mid-20th century, while porcelain versions became popular in the later part of the century.

== History ==
=== Origins ===
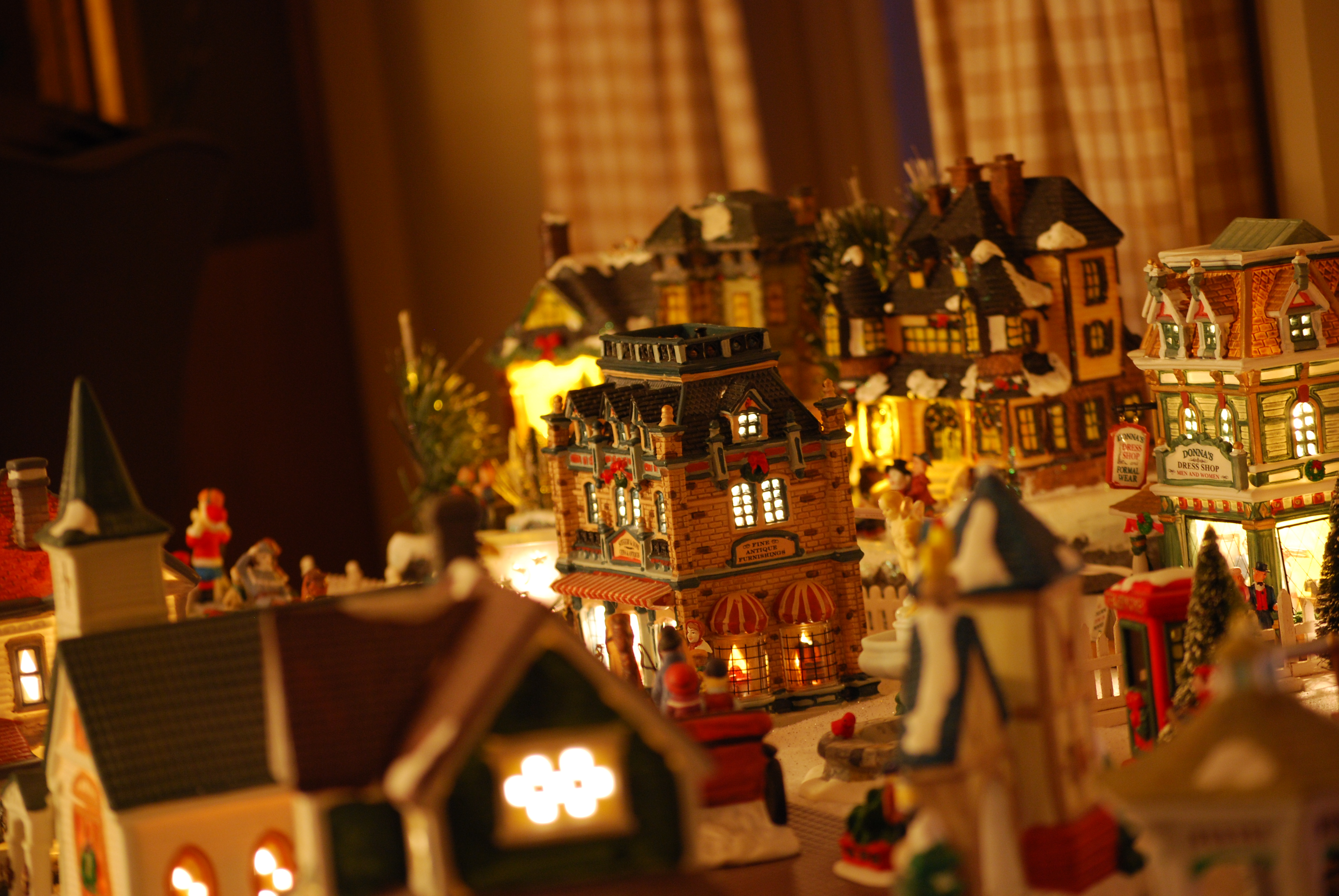
A Christmas village set atop a table

The tradition of decorative Christmas villages built around the Christmas tree is rooted in the late 18th century holiday traditions of the Moravian church, a Protestant denomination with early settlements in Salem, North Carolina and Bethlehem, Pennsylvania. Karal Ann Marling writes that "This usually took the form of an elaborate landscape with animals, which may or may not have alluded to the creatures in the stable at Bethlehem or the passengers on Noah’s Ark...the typical putz went beyond the limits of any biblical scene into pure, exuberant genre." These grew to encompass much more than a nativity scene, with animations such as working flour mills, jumping dogs, running water with waterfalls and electric trains, and could fill an entire room. Families would organize "putz parties" and compete for the best show. The term was derived from the German verb putzen, which means "to clean" or "to decorate."

=== Mass production ===
After World War II, several Japanese companies started mass-producing cardboard or paper houses, churches, and other buildings. These small buildings usually had holes in the back or the bottom through which Christmas lights were placed to provide illumination. The buildings had tiny colored cellophane windows and were decorated with mica-dusted roofs to give the appearance of snow. Since these buildings were made of inexpensive material and were widely available throughout the United States, they became a very popular Christmas decoration.

=== Modern villages ===
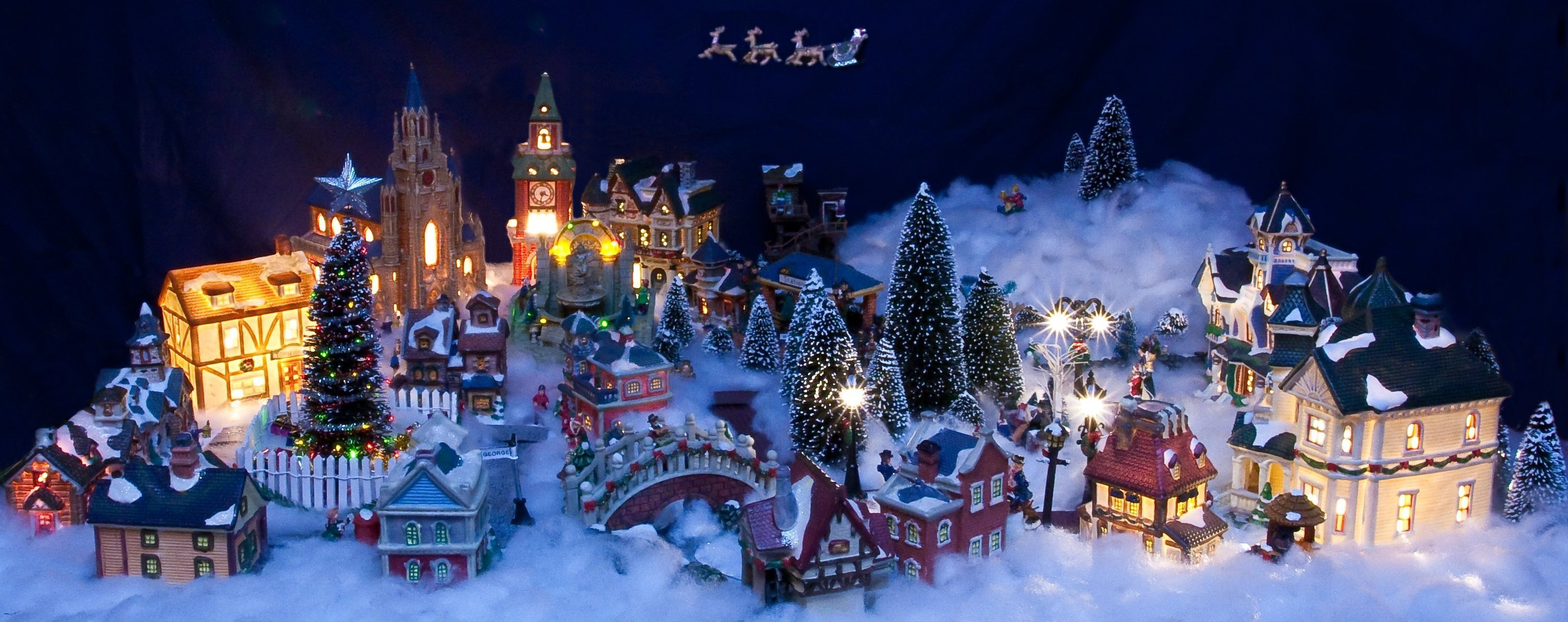
A modern Christmas village

In the 1970s, ceramic or porcelain Christmas villages were introduced and started to gain popularity. Department 56 was one of the first companies to make these buildings and remains amongst the most well-known. Other companies, such as Lemax, have also produced similar villages, and there are numerous other brands sold. In Europe, Luville and Dickensville are established brands.

Christmas village buildings are not usually made to consistent relative scale. A church building might well be ten times the height of an ordinary house in reality but this would make cumbersome models and look odd within a Christmas village display. It is only necessary for the church building to be noticeably taller than the house, to give it an imposing stature.

Like many other Christmas traditions, the notion of a village to celebrate a holiday has spread to other holidays, with a few companies making Halloween and Easter villages.

== See also ==
- gingerbread house
