= Winnie the Pooh and a Day for Eeyore =

1983 animated short film directed by Rick Reinert

- 1983 theatrical release poster with The Sword in the Stone (1963); Winnie the Pooh and a Day for Eeyore is featured at the bottom.
- Directed by: Rick Reinert
- Story by: Peter Young; Steve Hulett; Tony L. Marino
- Based on: Stories written by A. A. Milne
- Produced by: Rick Reinert
- Starring: Paul Winchell; Ralph Wright; Hal Smith; Will Ryan; Kim Christianson; Julie McWhirter; John Fiedler
- Narrated by: Laurie Main
- Music by: Steve Zuckerman
- Production companies: Walt Disney Productions; Rick Reinert Productions
- Distributed by: Buena Vista Pictures Distribution Company
- Release dates: March 11, 1983 (Limited); March 25, 1983 (with The Sword in the Stone)
- Running time: 26 minutes
- Country: United States
- Language: English

Winnie the Pooh and a Day for Eeyore is a 1983 American animated short film based on the sixth chapter of both books Winnie-the-Pooh and The House at Pooh Corner by A.A. Milne. Directed by Rick Reinert, the short features the voices of Paul Winchell, John Fiedler, Will Ryan, Ralph Wright, and Hal Smith. This short is notable for being Ralph Wright's final performance as Eeyore.

Produced by Walt Disney Productions and distributed by Buena Vista Distribution, the short initially received limited release on March 11, 1983, before expanding to a wide release on March 25 as part of a double feature with the re-issue of The Sword in the Stone, which it accompanied in most countries except Australia, where it screened alongside a rerelease of the Angela Lansbury musical, Bedknobs and Broomsticks.

Additionally, the animation was outsourced, produced by Rick Reinert Productions, uncredited in the final film. It would be the first Disney animated film since the 1938 Silly Symphonies short Merbabies to be produced by an outside studio. The company had also previously produced the educational Disney short Winnie the Pooh Discovers the Seasons in 1981.

Winnie the Pooh and a Day for Eeyore was the fourth and final animated featurette in the theatrical Disney Winnie the Pooh series, adapted from the Pooh books by A.A. Milne. The three previous shorts were combined into the feature-length The Many Adventures of Winnie the Pooh, released in 1977.

== Plot ==
The film begins with Pooh taking a walk to a wooden bridge over a river where he likes to do nothing in particular. On the way, he finds a fir cone and picks it up only to trip and drop the cone into the river. Noticing that the flow of the river takes the cone under the bridge, Pooh invents a racing game out of it. As the game uses sticks instead of cones, he calls it "Poohsticks".

Sometime later, Pooh, Piglet, Rabbit and Roo are playing Poohsticks when they see Eeyore floating in the river. After being rescued, Eeyore tells them that he fell in due to being bounced from behind. The gang accuses Tigger of causing this, which he denies until the narrator reveals that Tigger had indeed deliberately bounced Eeyore earlier. As Tigger leaves in disgust, Pooh and his friends notice that Eeyore is gloomier than usual.

Pooh follows Eeyore to his Gloomy Spot, where he learns that it is Eeyore's birthday, but nobody has taken any notice to celebrate it. Feeling sorry for Eeyore, Pooh decides to give him an empty honey pot as a birthday present and has Owl write a message on the pot. Afterwards, Owl flies off to tell Christopher Robin about the birthday. Meanwhile, Piglet, who was informed by Pooh of the situation, prepares to give a balloon to Eeyore, but gets distracted by Owl and accidentally causes the balloon to pop. A saddened Piglet presents the balloon to Eeyore anyway as Pooh arrives with the empty honey pot a minute later. Eeyore is gladdened, as he can now put the broken balloon into the pot and remove it again.

Later, a party is thrown for Eeyore during which Tigger invites himself to the festivities. A debate ensues over whether or not Tigger should stay at the party due to the way he treated Eeyore earlier until Christopher Robin suggests that they all play Poohsticks at the wooden bridge. Eeyore wins the most games despite being a first-time player, but Tigger wins nothing at all, much to his dismay. With the day ending, most of the cast go home, with Eeyore accompanying a sad Tigger and cheering him up. Finally, Christopher Robin, Pooh and Piglet are the only ones remaining at the bridge and they decide that "Tigger's all right, really" and "everyone's all right, really".

== Voice cast ==
- Ralph Wright as Eeyore
- Hal Smith as Winnie the Pooh and Owl
- Laurie Main as Mr. Narrator
- Will Ryan as Rabbit
- Dick Billingsley as Roo
- John Fiedler as Piglet
- Kim Christianson as Christopher Robin
- Julie McWhirter Dees as Kanga
- Paul Winchell as Tigger

Hal Smith, Ralph Wright, John Fiedler, and Paul Winchell were the only prior cast members to reprise their roles, with Smith also replacing Sterling Holloway as the voice of Pooh.

Kim Christianson became the fourth actor to portray Christopher Robin in as many featurettes, after Bruce Reitherman, Jon Walmsley, and Timothy Turner. Dick Billingsley assumed the role of Roo, succeeding Dori Whitaker and Clint Howard.

Will Ryan replaced Junius Matthews as Rabbit, Julie McWhirter Dees replaced Barbara Luddy as Kanga, and Laurie Main replaced Sebastian Cabot as the narrator; the original voices had all died since the previous shorts.

Steve Zuckerman replaced Buddy Baker as the musical composer for Winnie the Pooh and a Day for Eeyore.

== Home media ==
The first home video release for Winnie the Pooh and a Day for Eeyore was Winnie the Pooh and Friends, released on VHS in 1984, followed by other releases of this film, including the 1989 Walt Disney Mini-Classics release and the 1994 Storybook Classics release. It has since been included as a bonus feature on VHS, DVD and Blu-ray releases of The Many Adventures Of Winnie The Pooh, with the Blu-ray edition presenting the short in high definition.

== See also ==
- List of films in the Winnie the Pooh franchise
  - Winnie the Pooh Discovers the Seasons: an educational Winnie the Pooh short also outsourced to Rick Reinert Productions.
