= Gund Snuffles =

Plush teddy bear line

Gund Snuffles is a plush bear developed and produced by the GUND toy company and was the recipient of 1996 Oppenheim Toy Portfolio Award.

== History of Snuffles ==
Snuffles was designed in 1980 by Rita Raiffe who, at the time, led the company with her husband Herbert. She was inspired by the shape of the beautiful crescent moon in the sky, and designed a happy bear looking up at the Moon. Snuffles debuted in 1981 and is now the oldest bear in Gund's product line. The initial sizes offered were 12-inch tall models available in brown or white.

Since then, Snuffles has been produced in a number of sizes and colors, mostly between four inches and three feet tall. Available colors have included dark and light brown, white, tan, blue, pink, as well as rare green and yellow versions. In addition to the traditional teddy bear, Gund has made Snuffles into rattles, puppets and slippers. Some seasonal versions have been released. Most of the colored bears have a white snout, ears, and a white patch on their belly. There has been a variety of fur types made over the years including fur, velour, and terry cloth.

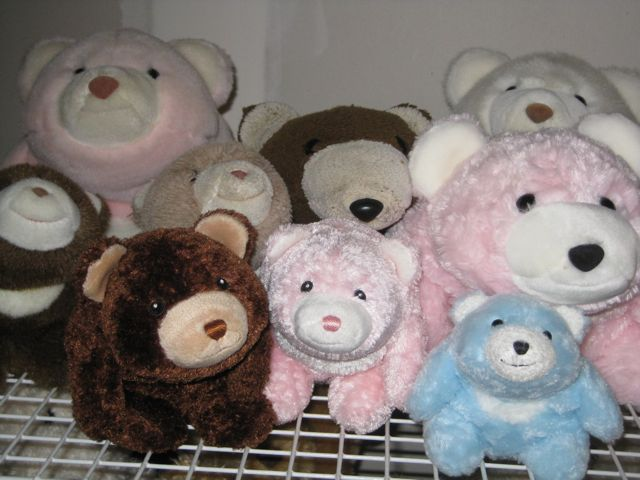
A variety of Snuffles bears, including an original Snuffles (back center)

Most Snuffles styles have a limited production run and are difficult to locate once they have been discontinued. A number of limited edition bears have been made including ones with mohair fur (tan version and cream version - cream version is numbered). A two-foot 25th anniversary blush colored edition was released in 2006, sold exclusively at FAO Schwarz stores. FAO Schwarz has been the exclusive retailer of a number of other Snuffles varieties including silver millennium editions and 2-foot-high (0.61 m) versions (tan and white versions). The standard size blush colored 12" Snuffles shown in the photo above was produced for Gund's 25th anniversary but was sold through many national retailers. Other editions have been made for Macy's, Pottery Barn, and Barnes & Noble. In 2010, the company produced a one of a kind Snuffles for the American International Toy Fair in New York City. Priced at $10,000, the Snuffles on display featured white alpaca fur, eyes made from black Tahitian pearls, and sported a 10-carat diamond necklace.

== Sizes ==
10" Snuffles, 25th Anniversary Edition

Gund Snuffles come in many different sizes. These sizes range from 4" tall to 3 ft tall. There are over 120 styles of Gund Snuffles made, but most are only produced for a season or a year.

== Colors ==
Gund Snuffles are available in a variety of different colors and materials. The colors include: Bloo (light blue), Marshmallow (white), Snowflake (white), Pink Bubblegum (pink), Chocolate Truffle (dark brown), light brown, tan, mint green (Gwen, extremely rare), yellow (Stella) and blue. Several Mohair versions (light brown with mohair fur - limited to only 1000 made; a cream mohair version limited to 400 made and a brown mohair bear limited to 200 made). Recently, a 25th anniversary blush colored edition was released in 2006 (available in 10"/25.5 cm size and a 2 ft tall version sold exclusively at FAO Schwarz, which is now sold out). Other limited edition versions were made exclusively for Macy's, Pottery Barn and Barnes & Noble.

The majority of colored Snuffles bears feature a small white patch on their belly and snout. The white patch on their belly is coincidentally similar to the spots that sun bears have on their bellies.

A Gund Snuffles Bear (small size)

== Notes ==
- Recipient of 1996 Oppenheim Toy Portfolio Award
- 25th Anniversary edition has a medallion commemorating the anniversary of his release
- 30th Anniversary edition introduced 4 new snuffles bears in two different sizes. Snuffles carries a leather medallion commemorating the anniversary of his birthday.
- There is a limited edition black snuffles with white collar limited to 1500 pieces worldwide.
