= Pusheen =

Fictional cat and accompanying universe

Pusheen the Cat
- First appearance: 2010
- Created by: Claire Belton

In-universe information
- Gender: Female
- Relatives: Stormy (Little Sister); Pip (Little Brother); Sunflower (Mum); Biscuit (Dad)

Pusheen is a cartoon cat who is the subject of comic strips, plush toys, vinyl figures, sticker sets, among other merchandise, on Tumblr, Facebook, Instagram, iMessage, YouTube, and other social media platforms. Pusheen was created in 2010 by Claire Belton and Andrew Duff for a comic strip on their website, Everyday Cute. More recently, the Pusheen character has been used in social media posts, and on the Pusheen blog.

On the official Pusheen website, Pusheen is described as being a female fictional cat who loves blogging, snacking, and going on adventures. The original comic strip series included characters modeled after Belton, her love interest Duff, their dog named Carm (short for "Carmen"), and Pusheen, a chubby grey tabby cat based on Belton's cat that now lives with her parents in Oregon, Illinois. Pusheen's name stems from the word puisín, which means kitten in Irish. Occasionally, Pusheen and her sister Stormy are drawn in different themes, such as Pusheenosaurus Rex, where Pusheen is a dinosaur and Stormy is in a dinosaur egg. She also appears in other cute and comical forms, such as Pusheenicorn, Purrmaid, and many other themes. Pusheen has a mom named Sunflower, a dad named Biscuit, a sister named Stormy, a brother named Pip, and an array of non-pet friends, including Sloth the sloth, Bo the parakeet, and Cheek the hamster.

== History ==
Pusheen first appeared in May 2010 in the comic strip Pusheen Things on Claire Belton and Andrew Duff's website, Everyday Cute. Belton is an illustrator and entrepreneur, best known for creating Pusheen, along with several related cartoon characters. She is president of Pusheen Corp in Chicago, Illinois.

In 2011, Belton and Duff launched a spin-off site dedicated to Pusheen. In 2013, Belton published I Am Pusheen The Cat, a collection of comic strips featuring Pusheen. In 2021, Belton published a sequel, The Many Lives of Pusheen the Cat.

Pusheen has become well known for appearing in sticker sets on Facebook, wherein stickers are images that can be attached to personal messages or comments. The stickers feature, including a set of Pusheen stickers, was introduced to Android in April 2013, and subsequently added to the main Facebook website in July. In an article for PC Magazine on emoji and unicode, Sascha Segan called Pusheen Facebook's "proprietary emoji", used as a form of vendor lock-in. In April 2017, the Pusheen Corporation acquired office space in Park Ridge, Illinois, a suburb of Chicago. The offices are used as a workspace for artists and photographers.

On February 18, 2025, Pusheen celebrated her 15th birthday.

== Social media ==
Pusheen is an example of the popularity of cats on the Internet. An exhibition at the New York City Museum of the Moving Image examined the phenomenon, highlighting Pusheen alongside other celebrity cats such as Grumpy Cat and Lil Bub. Pusheen's Facebook page has over 9.2 million fans as of February 2019. The brand has expanded with merchandise, including an app. Pusheen has expanded to take part in multiple social media platforms, including Instagram, Pinterest, and Twitter. She also has many fan pages within the platforms, as well as blogs dedicated to celebrating the comic. Her popularity has allowed the Pusheen Corporation to create an app that is an expansion of the sticker collection that started on Facebook. Each social media account owned by Pusheen's creators has gained over a million followers. Due to this rise in popularity, the company has started releasing GIFs on its website several times a month.

The Pusheen GIFs on Facebook include Pusheens resembling desserts. They also have images of Pusheen eating food such as pizza and donuts. Pusheen.com formerly had a self-quiz to show what kind of Pusheen fan you are.

There are YouTube videos featuring Pusheen on the official Pusheen YouTube channel.

== Merchandising ==
The Pusheen corporation started selling Pusheen merchandise after her popularity took off in 2010. The first Pusheen merchandise was sold on the Everyday Cute website as a charm keychain and necklace. From there, the merchandising expanded. In 2014, Gund developed an interest in Pusheen and became the manufacturer of her plush toys and blind boxes. Pusheen Corp has teamed up with many brands to create and sell merchandise in stores, including retailer-specific items. Pusheen Corp has many current retailers, including Hot Topic, Books-A-Million, Barnes & Noble, Claire's, Petco, Walmart, Target, FYE, and Gund. Pusheen also has a Funko Pop! line that consists of various styles of vinyl figures. Pusheen Corp expanded its merchandising to the website formerly known as Hey Chickadee, rebranded as The Pusheen Shop in 2019. The site features merchandise collections dedicated to Pusheen, including plush toys, clothing, home decor, and accessories. A quarterly subscription box, called the Pusheen Box, filled with Pusheen Products, is also available. In 2022, the video game Fall Guys collaborated with her. In 2023, the video game Among Us collaborated with her.
