= Enesco =

American company

Enesco, LLC
- Company type: Private
- Industry: Giftware
- Founded: 1958; 68 years ago
- Headquarters: Itasca, Illinois
- Key people: Michael Griffith (president)
- Products: Gift, Garden and Home decor products
- Parent: Ad Populum
- Subsidiaries: Department 56, Gregg Gift Company, Enesco Limited (UK), Enesco Canada, Enesco France
- Website: www.enesco.com

Enesco is a privately held American giftware company that began in 1958. After changing ownership many times, the company was bought in 2023 by holding company Ad Populum. Brands owned or licensed by Enesco include Heartwood Creek (Jim Shore) and Department 56, and formerly Precious Moments and Things Remembered.

== History ==
In 1958, Enesco was the import division for the N. Shure Company. Enesco was founded by its first president, Louis R. "Bob" Miller, Jr. When N. Shure was sold to Butler Brothers, the import division was spun off. The name "Enesco" was an acronym from the N. Shure company, "N S Co", and phonetically named his company "EnEsCo".

Thereafter, the company was sold three times, and in 1983 became a part of Stanhome, Inc. After separating from Stanhome in 1998, Stanhome immediately collapsed—leaving Enesco with all of Stanhome's assets.

Enesco is known in its industry for its 25 years of success with the Precious Moments porcelain figurine line of products. Freedman worked with original artist, Sam Butcher, to bring his designs to market. The company sales soared throughout the '70s, '80s, and '90s until its peak in 1997.

In 2002, Enesco partnered with artist Jim Shore to create and license the Heartwood Creek product brand. The agreement was renewed for five more years in 2014 and has continued since then with an "open-ended" status.

By 2004, Enesco, Corp. posted an operating loss of $15.7 million US dollars. The sales of Precious Moments items plunged from a high of $206 million in 1996 to $55.7 million in 2004, a drop of $27.5 million from 2003.

According to Enesco's 2004–2005 annual report, "Precious Moments revenues represented 22% of consolidated net revenues in 2004 compared to 33% in 2003." In 2005 Enesco ended its business partnership and license arrangement with Precious Moments, Inc.

In 2006, a year after the departure of Precious Moments, Enesco's fourth president, Cynthia Passmore-McLaughlin (formerly of Revlon) resigned. Enesco's stock price fell below US$1 and was delisted from the New York Stock Exchange. After a few months of over-the-counter trading, Enesco withdrew its public offering altogether. On January 12, 2007, Enesco filed for Chapter 11 bankruptcy protection.

In February 2007, Enesco Group, Inc. was purchased by Tinicum Capital Partners and became Enesco, LLC.

In 2009, Enesco acquired Department 56 from Lenox.

Balmoral Funds, a Los Angeles-based private equity fund acquired Enesco, LLC in 2015.

Spin Master acquired the Gund business from Enesco in 2018.

In 2019, Enesco bought most of the Things Remembered company, before closing all of the retail locations and selling the brand to 1-800-Flowers in January 2023.

The Ad Populum holding company acquired Enesco in January 2023.
