= Fake snow =

Simulated non-water snow

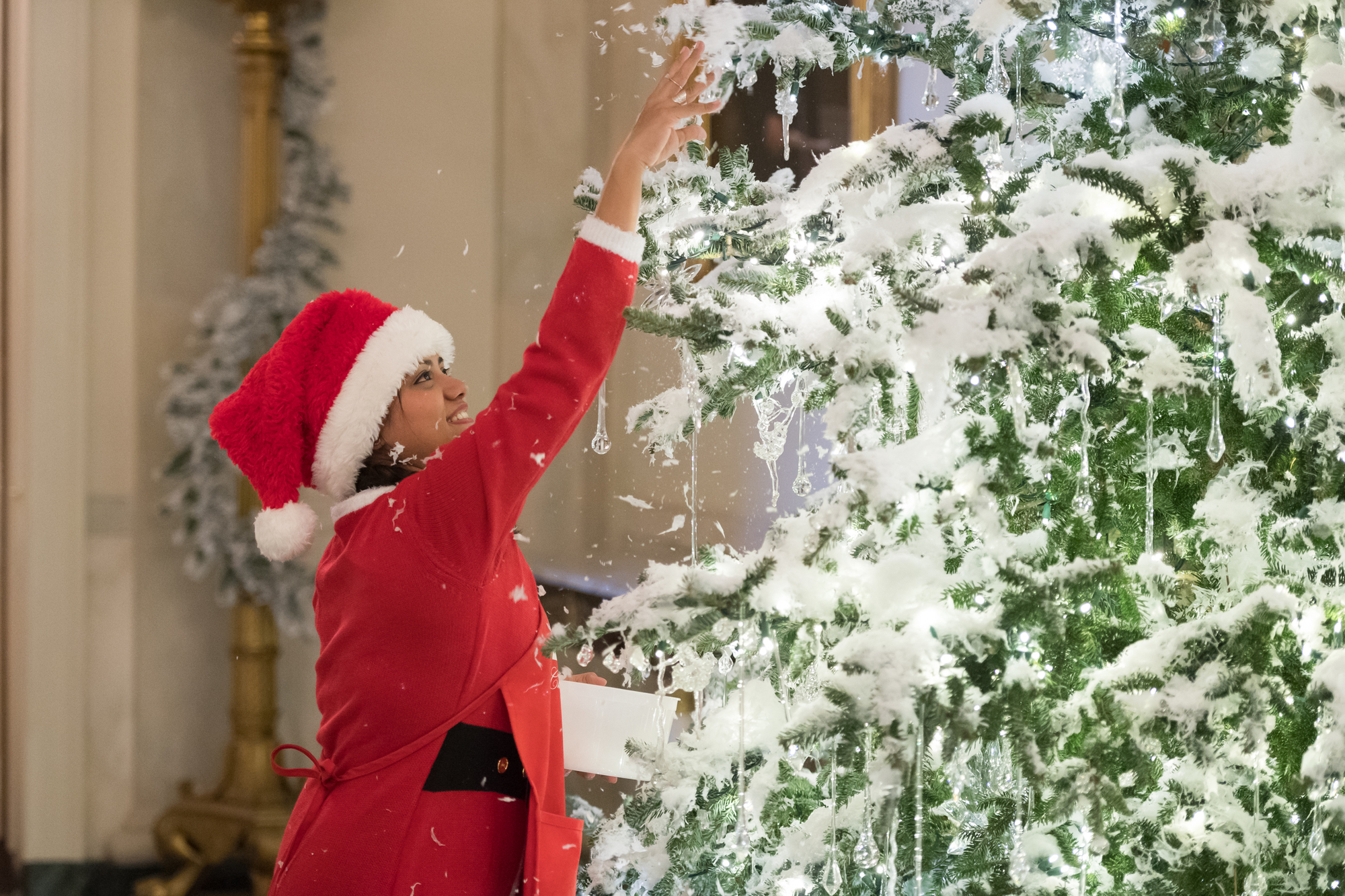
A White House decoration volunteer throws fake snow onto a Christmas tree at the White House

Fake snow is any product which simulates the appearance and texture of snow, without being made from frozen crystalline water.

Fake snow has been made from many materials. In the early 1900s, decorative snow was sometimes made from borax flakes and even ammonia.

Before the dangers of asbestos were known, the substance was sold for Christmas tree decoration. It was also used to simulate snow in films, including The Wizard of Oz and Citizen Kane, although gypsum may have been used until it was banned. Actor Lon Chaney died after fake snow, lodged in his throat, caused a serious infection, which then lead to a throat hemmorrhage of which he died.

Fake snow has also been sold in spray cans which could apply the flocking to windows and indoor displays.

== Film and theatre ==
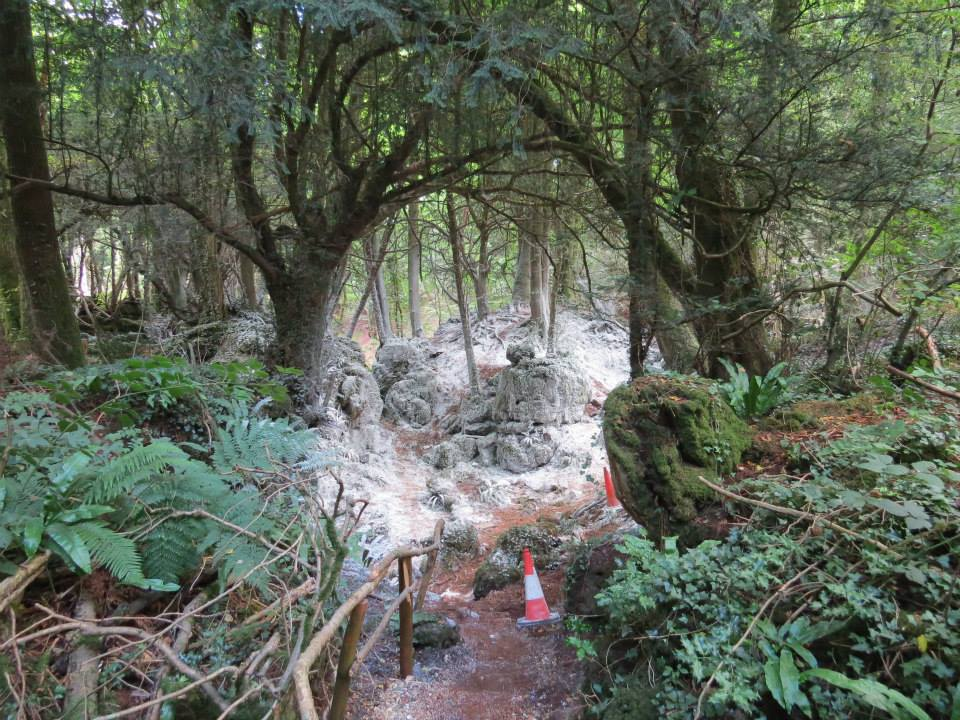
Fake snow at a filming location for the Doctor Who 2013 Christmas Special

When snow-like scenery is needed in live theatre, materials have included feathers, cotton, paper, breakfast cereal and potato flakes. To reduce the cleanup problem, many theatres use "snow generators" which create soapy white bubbles which disappear after a short time. A similar process has been used in film studios and backlots; one well-known example is It's a Wonderful Life. Director, Frank Capra, refused cornflake snow made from asbestos and gypsum. Working with Russell Shearman, special effects artist, they created fake snow from foamite, soap, sugar, and water. The mixture was then released from high-pressure cans, causing the fake snowfall to appear natural. The properties of the fake snow were also realistic as actors could clump the mixture in their hands and leave footprints on the ground. Shearman along with his staff, Jack Lannan and Marty Martin won an Oscar, the Technical Achievement Award, for their special effects efforts.

For outdoor film scenes needing large amounts of fake snow, salt was an inexpensive choice, but damaging to soil and plant life. Gypsum and bleached or painted cereal flakes have often been used; a less noisy alternative is paper, which is shredded and spread by specially-built machines. Snow blankets, made from woven tapestries, are typically used to represent large areas of snow for a background.

Many productions turn to eco-friendly fake snow, crafted from recycled paper and food-quality ingredients, to build expansive winter settings. Its biodegradable makeup ensures it dissolves harmlessly, preventing environmental runoff. SnowCel, a paper-based material, is known for replicating various snowfalls and frost. The modern industry commonly uses SnowCel as its properties are non-toxic.

Finally, the newest method for creating movie snow involves adding it digitally during post-production. Specialized software generates realistic snow overlays, allowing editors to choose from many detailed effects, such as falling, piling, or melting snow.

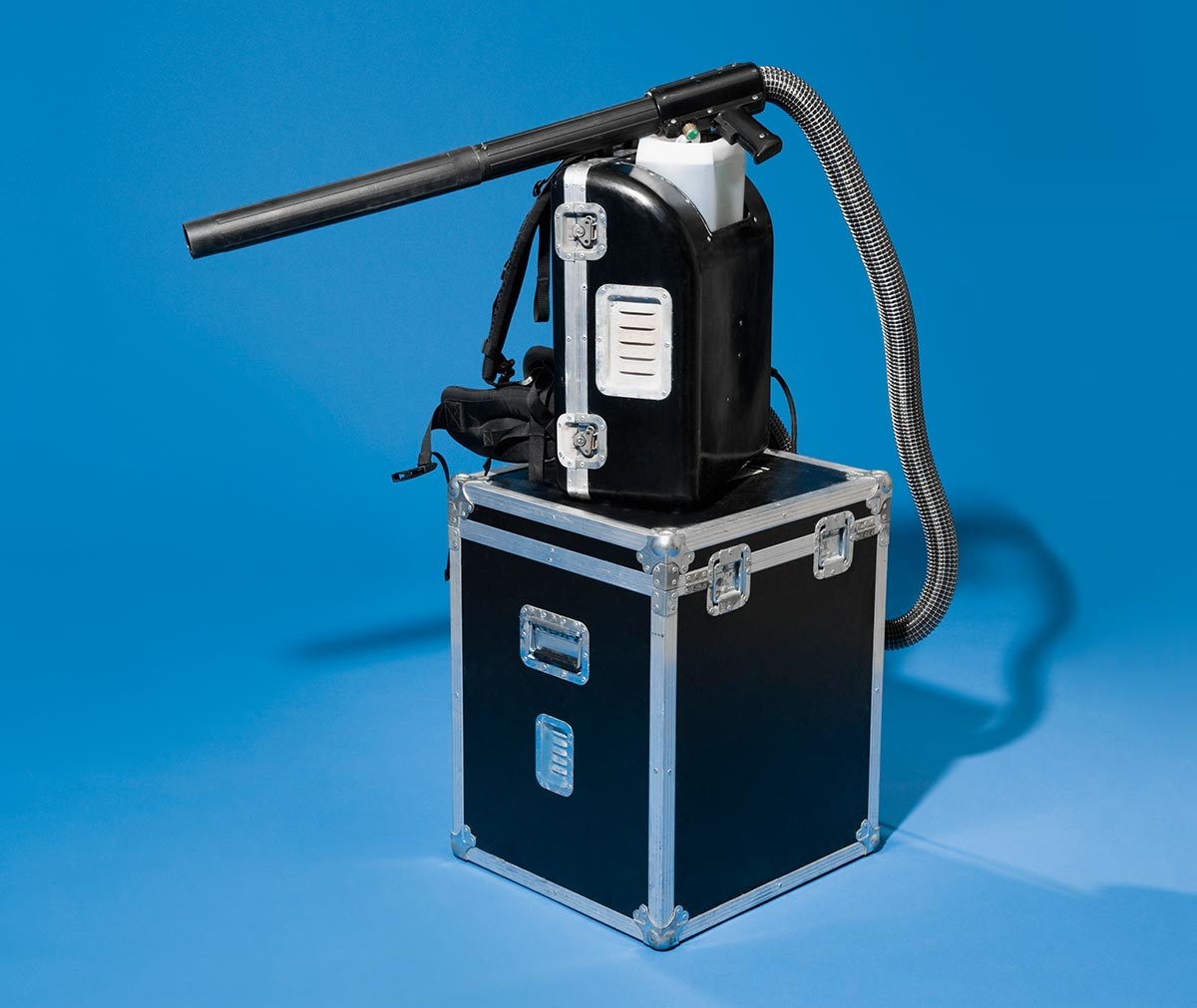
Theater snow machine

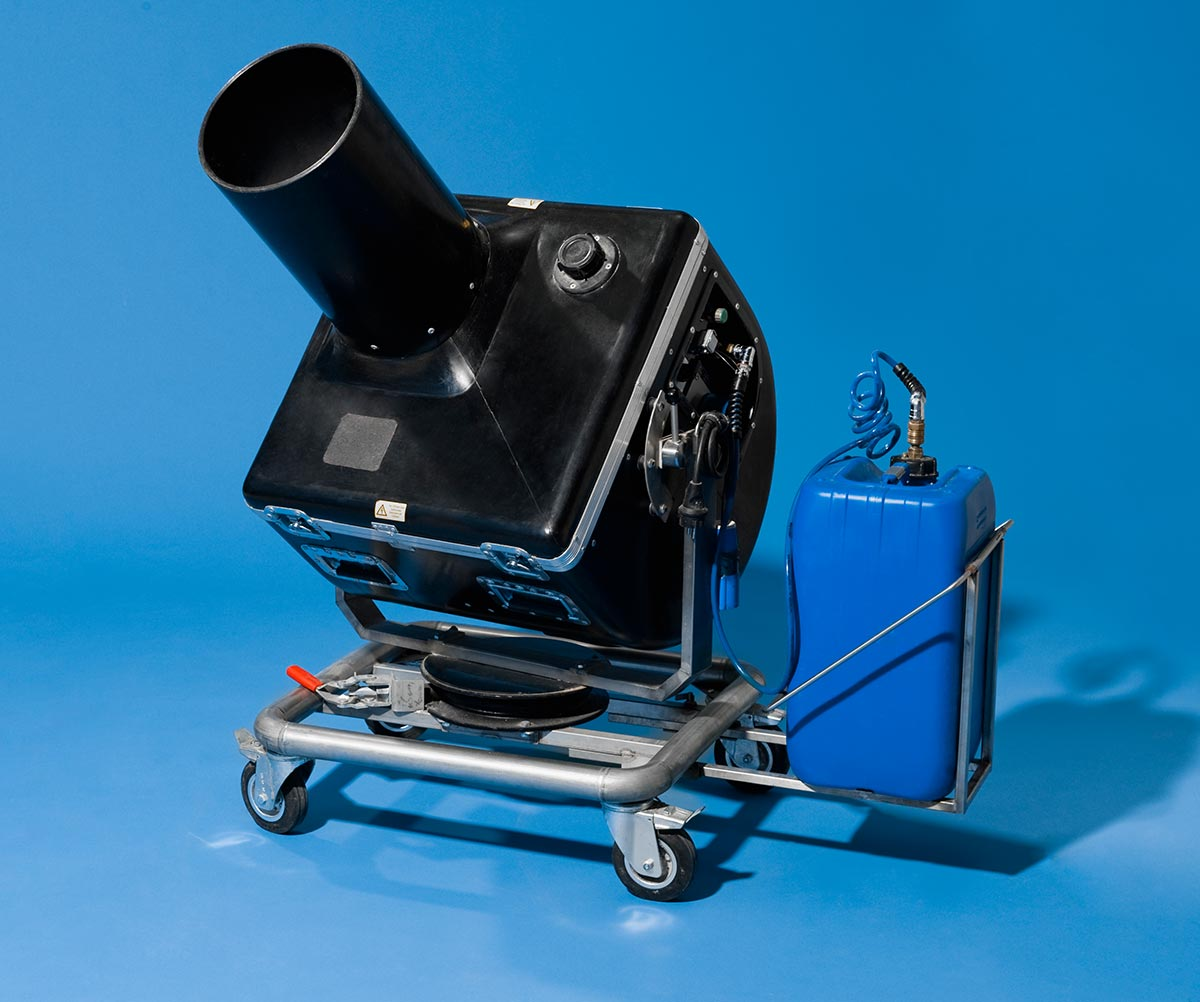
Theater snow machine on wheels

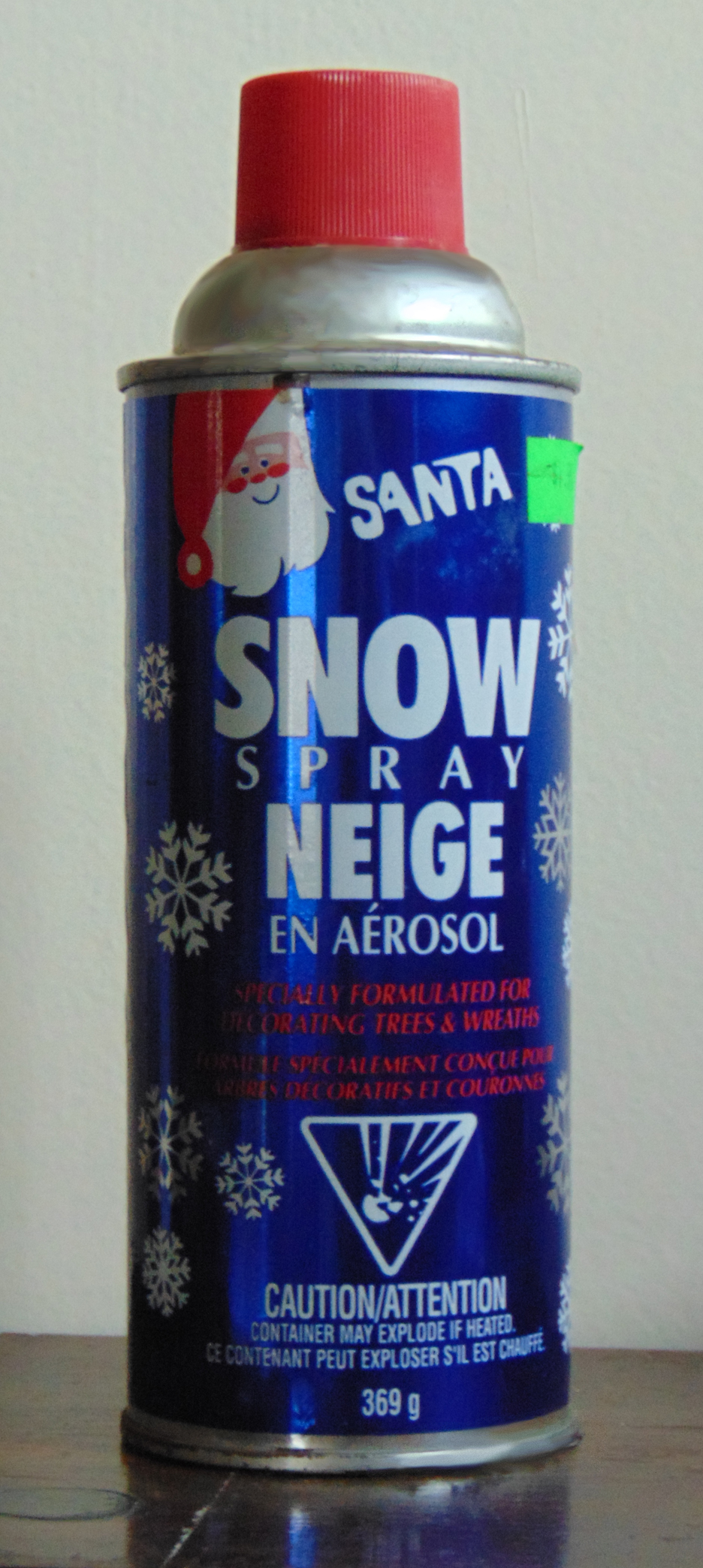
Aerosol can of artificial snow

== Making fake snow ==
A common method for creating artificial snow at home involves combining household materials. To make this mixture, baking soda and hair conditioner are placed in a bowl, and small amounts of water are gradually added until the texture becomes slightly sticky. Decorative items such as beads, buttons, or other craft materials may be mixed in to enhance the appearance and texture of the fake snow.
