= Precious Moments, Inc. =

American catalog order company

Precious Moments Company, Inc.
- Type: Private
- Industry: Distributors, discretionary
- Founded: 1978
- Headquarters: Carthage, Missouri
- Website: www.preciousmoments.com

Precious Moments Company, Inc. (PMI) is an American catalog order company that sells giftware, including collectible porcelain figurines. The company was formed in 1978 by the illustrator Samuel J. Butcher, as a licensing company.

== History ==
Illustrator Sam Butcher, with his business partner Bill Biel, sold greeting cards at Christian book fairs under the company name of Jonathan & David. They partnered with Enesco, Corp. to sell giftware.

In 1991, the company created a series of seasonal animated specials, starting with the Christmas special Timmy's Gift, which focuses on an angel named Timmy following a star which will lead him to the newborn prince (later to be revealed as Jesus) he has to send a gift to. In 1993, a sequel was made, titled Timmy's Special Delivery. Other seasonal specials were made throughout the 1990s, including the Easter special Simon the Lamb (1994), the Thanksgiving special Little Sparrow (1995), Who's Who at the Zoo? (1995), and The Story of Joseph, based on the story of the same name seen in the Book of Genesis.

In 2004, PMI and Enesco ended the licensing contract. In addition to its original licensing duties, PMI's functions became product design, marketing, warehousing, and distribution.

In 2008, PMI launched its new line of "Precious Girls Club" products, written by Cindy Kenney. The following September, country music singer Shannon Clemmons sued the company for copyright infringement and breach of contract. In October 2008, the federal judge assigned to the case dismissed 15 of 18 claims against PMI in the suit, and in November 2008, a jury cleared PMI of any wrongdoing with regard to the remaining counts.

In 2018, PMI, in honor of its 40th anniversary, announced a three-year agreement with Feed the Children.

In 2021, it was announced that an animated series based on the line is in production.

== Product ==
Precious Moments sells collectible figurines made out of porcelain. Figurines typically depict children with teardrop-shaped eyes. Older figurines are often resold onto second-hand markets, like eBay. There have been collections valued at $15,000 on second-hand markets.

== Chapel ==
The Precious Moments Chapel in Carthage, Missouri

The Precious Moments Chapel in Carthage, Missouri, is a theme park run by PMI. The "Chapel" itself is a structure within the park and was completed in 1989.

The chapel features paintings by Sam Butcher, depicting children or childlike figures cast as Biblical prophets, angels, or figures from the parables of Jesus.

In January 2007, PMI announced the discontinuation of many of its attractions, including the "Fountain of Angels", due to "financial difficulties arising from diminished numbers of paid visitors resulting from higher gas prices and the general decline of the brand". Other closures include the "Wedding Island", "The "RV Park", "The Gallery", and "Souper Sam’s". In spring 2007, "The Gallery" was remodeled, renamed "The Samuel J. Butcher Museum" and reopened. The Chapel, Gift Shop, and Visitors Center continue to be open to the public.
