= List of animated television series of 1980 =

A list of animated television series first aired in 1980.

Animated television series first aired in 1980
Title	Episodes	Country	Year	Notes	Technique
The Amazing Adventures of Morph	26	United Kingdom	1980–81		Stop Motion
Archibald le Magi-chien	46	France	1980–81		Traditional
Aubrey	39	United Kingdom	1980		Traditional
Cockleshell Bay	104	United Kingdom	1980–86		Stop-Motion
Cro et Bronto	45	Taiwan	1980		Traditional
Curious George (1980)	84	Canada, United States	1980		Traditional
Delta space mission	16	Romania	1980–83		Traditional
Dingbat and the Creeps	26	United States	1980–81	Aired as a segment on Heathcliff and Dingbat	Traditional
Drak Pack	16	Australia, United States	1980		Traditional
Eureka!	30	Canada	1980–81		Traditional
The Flintstone Comedy Show	18	United States	1980–81	Spin-off of The Flintstones.	Traditional
Flok a Flíček	7	Philippines	1980		Stop Motion
The Fonz and the Happy Days Gang	24	United States	1980–81	Spin-off of Happy Days.	Traditional
Hanna–Barbera's World of Super Adventure	18	United States	1980–84	Package consisting of Birdman and the Galaxy Trio, Space Ghost and Dino Boy, Fantastic Four, Moby Dick and Mighty Mightor, The Herculoids, Shazzan, and Frankenstein Jr. and The Impossibles.	Traditional
Heathcliff	26	United States	1980–81	Based on Heathcliff. Also aired as a segment on Heathcliff and Dingbat.	Traditional
King Rollo	13	United Kingdom	1980		Cut-Outs
The New Adventures of the Lone Ranger	28	United States	1980–82	Originally aired part of The Tarzan/Lone Ranger Adventure Hour	Traditional
Pom Pom meséi	26	Vietnam	1980		Traditional
Richie Rich	42	United States	1980–84	Originally aired as part of The Richie Rich/Scooby-Doo Show	Traditional
The Richie Rich/Scooby-Doo Show	21	United States	1980–81		Traditional
Scooby-Doo and Scrappy-Doo	33	United States	1980–82	Spin-off of Scooby-Doo, Where Are You! and Scooby-Doo and Scrappy-Doo (1979).	Traditional
Sport Billy	26	United States	1980–81		Traditional
Super Friends	22	United States	1980–83	Spin-off of Super Friends (1973)	Traditional
The Tarzan/Lone Ranger Adventure Hour	26	United States	1980–82	Package Series	Traditional
Thundarr the Barbarian	21	United States	1980–81		Traditional
The Tom and Jerry Comedy Show	15	United States	1980	Spin-off of Tom and Jerry	Traditional

Anime television series first aired in 1980

Title	Episodes	Country	Year	Original Channel	Technique
The Adventures of Tom Sawyer	49	Japan	1980		Anime
Ashita no Joe 2	47	Japan	1980–81		Anime
Astro Boy	52	Japan	1980–81		Anime
Fisherman Sanpei	109	Japan	1980–82		Anime
Force Five	130	Japan	1980–81		Anime
Ganbare Genki	35	Japan	1980–81		Anime
Ganbare Gonbe	77	Japan	1980		Anime
Hoero! Bun Bun	39	Japan	1980–81		Anime
Invincible Robo Trider G7	50	Japan	1980–81		Anime
Kagee Grimm Douwa	52	Japan	1980–81		Anime
King Arthur: Prince on White Horse	22	Japan	1980		Anime
Kirin Ashita no Calendar	1306	Japan	1980–84		Anime
Lalabel, the Magical Girl	49	Japan	1980–81		Anime
The Littl' Bits	26	Japan	1980		Anime
Maeterlinck's Blue Bird: Tyltyl and Mytyl's Adventurous Journey	26	Japan	1980		Anime
Manga Kotowaja Jiten	88	Japan	1980–82		Anime
Monchhichi Twins	130	Japan	1980		Anime
The Monster Kid	94	Japan	1980–82		Anime
Mū no Hakugei	26	Japan	1980		Anime
Muteking, The Dashing Warrior	56	Japan	1980–81		Anime
The New Adventures of Gigantor	51	Japan	1980–81		Anime
Ojamanga Yamada-kun	103	Japan	1980–82		Anime
Rescueman	53	Japan	1980–81		Anime
Ruy, the Little Cid	26	Japan	1980		Anime
Space Battleship Yamato III	25	Japan	1980–81		Anime
Space Emperor God Sigma	50	Japan	1980–81		Anime
Space Runaway Ideon	39	Japan	1980–81		Anime
Space Warrior Baldios	34	Japan	1980–81		Anime
Sue Cat	40	Japan	1980		Anime
The Wonderful Adventures of Nils	52	Japan	1980–81		Anime
X-Bomber	25	Japan	1980–81	Christmas Stories 2022 (United States)	Anime
Zukkoke Knight - Don De La Mancha	23	Japan	1980	Story Of Rainbow (United States)	Anime

== See also ==
- List of animated feature films of 1980
- List of Japanese animation television series of 1980
