= List of animated feature films of 1980 =

This is a list of animated feature films first released in 1980.

== List ==
Title	Country	Director	Production company	Animation technique	Format	Notes	Release date	Duration
15 Sonyeon Uju Pyoryugi; 15소년 우주 표류기 (15 Boy Space Drifter)	South Korea	Jeong Su-yong	Sambu Productions	Traditional	Theatrical	Third installment of the Dreamland Cartoon Theater series.	July 27, 1980	80 minutes
3000 Leagues in Search of Mother 母をたずねて三千里 (Haha o Tazunete Sanzenri)	Japan	Isao Takahata; Hajime Okayasu	Nippon Animation	Traditional	Theatrical	Film compiled from TV series episodes	July 19, 1980	107 minutes
Animalympics	United States	Steven Lisberger	Lisberger Studios	Traditional	Television film	Originally planned as two one-hour television specials to be aired on NBC as a companion piece to the network's coverage of the 1980 Summer and Winter Olympics; A theatrical version was later prepared for overseas release.	February 1, 1980	75 minutes
Back to the Forest のどか森の動物大作戦 (Nodoka Mori no Doubutsu Daisakusen)	Japan	Yoshio Kuroda	Nippon Animation; Fuji TV	Traditional	Television special	Sixth animated special produced for Fuji TV's "Nissei Family Special" program.	February 3, 1980	75 minutes
Be Forever Yamato ヤマトよ永遠に (Yamato yo Towa ni)	Japan	Leiji Matsumoto; Toshio Masuda	Academy Productions; Group TAC	Traditional	Theatrical	Fourth feature film in the Space Battleship Yamato series and the third to be released theatrically.	August 2, 1980	145 minutes
Betty Boop for President	United States	Dan Dalton	Fleischer Studios; Dan Dalton Productions; National Telefilm Associates; New Line Cinema	Traditional	Theatrical; Compilation film	Compilation film of select Betty Boop cartoons adapted for television syndication and then reanimated in color in South Korea by NTA; originally titled Hurray for Betty Boop and meant for a 1976 theatrical release.	November 21, 1980	78 minutes
Bloody Lady; Krvavá paní	Czechoslovakia	Viktor Kubal		Traditional	Theatrical			77 minutes
Bon Voyage, Charlie Brown (and Don't Come Back!!)	United States	Bill Melendez; Phil Roman	United Feature Syndicate	Traditional	Theatrical	The fourth and final feature film in the Peanuts franchise until 2015, and the only installment so far to feature adult characters and their actual voices on screen.	May 30, 1980	76 minutes
Botchan 坊っちゃん	Japan	Yoshio Takeuchi	Tokyo Movie Shinsha; Fuji TV	Traditional	Television special	Eighth animated special produced for Fuji TV's "Nissei Family Special" program.	June 13, 1980	70 minutes
Captain キャプテン	Japan	Satoshi Dezaki	Eiken; Nippon TV	Traditional	Television special		April 2, 1980	94 minutes
Colargol and the Wonderful Suitcase; Colargol i cudowna walizka	Poland	Tadeusz Wilkosz	Se-ma-for	Stop motion	Theatrical		January 17, 1980	75 minutes
Cyborg 009: Legend of the Super Galaxy サイボーグ009 超銀河伝説 (Saibōgu Zero Zero Nain: Chou Ginga Densetsu)	Japan	Masayuki Akehi	Toei Animation	Traditional	Theatrical		December 20, 1980	130 minutes
Doksuri 5 Hyeongje 독수리 5형제 (The 5 Eagle Brothers)	South Korea	Yi Gyu-hong	Samjung Planning Co., Ltd.	Traditional	Theatrical	Unauthorized reanimated remake of Science Ninja Team Gatchaman: The Movie (1978).	July 26, 1980	72 minutes
Doraemon: Nobita's Dinosaur ドラえもん のび太の恐竜 (Doraemon – Nobita no Kyōryū)	Japan	Hiroshi Fukutomi	Toho	Traditional	Theatrical	First installment of the Doraemon film series; Remade 26 years later in 2006.	March 15, 1980	100 minutes
Dracula: Sovereign of the Damned 闇の帝王 吸血鬼ドラキュラ (Yami no Teiō: Kyūketsuki Dorakyura)	Japan	Minoru Okazaki	Toei Animation; TV Asahi	Traditional	Television film		August 19, 1980	94 minutes
Eleven Hungry Cats; 11ぴきのねこ (11 Piki no Neko)	Japan	Shiro Fujimoto	Group TAC	Traditional	Theatrical		July 19, 1980	83 minutes
Foam Bath; Habfürdö	Hungary	György Kovásznai	Pannónia Filmstúdió	Traditional	Theatrical		April 6, 1980	79 minutes
Fumoon フウムーン	Japan	Hisashi Sakaguchi	Tezuka Productions; Nippon TV	Traditional	Television film	Third animated special produced for Nippon TV's 24 Hour TV "Love Saves the Earth" telethon.	August 31, 1980	91 minutes
Gaegujangi Cheonsadeul 개구장이 천사들 (The Mischievous Angels)	South Korea	Bae Yeong-lang	Dong-A Yanghaeng Co., Ltd.	Traditional	Theatrical		December 25, 1980	75 minutes
Galaxy Express 999: Can You Love Like a Mother!! 銀河鉄道９９９・君は母のように愛せるか！！ (Ginga Tetsudō 999: Kimi wa Haha no You ni Aiseru ka!!)	Japan	Osamu Kasai; Takenori Kawada	Toei Animation	Traditional	Television special	Alternate retelling of episodes 51 ("Artemis of the Transparent Sea–Part 1") & 52 ("Artemis of the Transparent Sea–Part 2") from the anime television series.	October 2, 1980	93 minutes
Galaxy Express 999: Emeraldas the Eternal Traveller 銀河鉄道９９９ 永遠の旅人エメラルダス (Ginga Tetsudō 999: Eien no Tabibito Emeraldas)	Japan	Nobutaka Nishizawa; Rintaro	Toei Animation	Traditional	Television special	Alternate retelling of episode 22 ("The Pirate Ship Queen Emeraldes") from the anime television series.	April 3, 1980	48 minutes
Ganbare!! Tabuchi-kun!! 2nd Gekitō Pennant Race がんばれ!! タブチくん!! 第2弾 激闘ペナントレース (Good Luck!! Tabuchi-kun!! 2nd Fierce Fight Pennant Race)	Japan	Tsutomu Shibayama	Tokyo Movie Shinsha	Traditional	Theatrical		May 3, 1980	94 minutes
Ganbare!! Tabuchi-kun!! Hatsu Warai 3rd Aa Tsuppari Jinsei がんばれ!! タブチくん!! 初笑い第3弾 あゝツッパリ人生 (Good Luck!! Tabuchi-kun!! First Laughter 3rd Oh Tightness Life)	Japan	Tsutomu Shibayama	Tokyo Movie Shinsha	Traditional	Theatrical		December 13, 1980	96 minutes
Gnomes	United States	Jack Zander	Tomorrow Entertainment	Traditional	Television special		November 11, 1980	60 minutes
Ikkyū-san: Ōabare no Yancha-hime 一休さん 大暴れやんちゃ姫 (Ikkyū-san: Rampage of the Mischievous Princess)	Japan	Kimio Yabuki; Iku Ishiguro; Takeshi Shirado; Akinori Orai	Toei Animation; TV Asahi	Traditional	Television special	Originally aired in between episodes 217 ("A Hanging Scroll and a Disappearing White Horse") and 218 ("Kikyouya, Who Lost Without Doing the Magistrate") of the animated television series respectively.	August 25, 1980	49 minutes
The King and the Mockingbird; Le roi et l'oiseau	France	Paul Grimault	Les Films Paul Grimault; Les Films Gibé; Antenne 2	Traditional	Theatrical	Originally released unfinished in 1952 without Grimault's consent, but he regained the rights to finish it in 1980, making it one of the longest productions in an animated feature.	March 19, 1980	87 minutes
Kkomaeosa Ttori 꼬마어사 똘이 (Ddoli the Royal Secret Inspector)	South Korea	Kim Cheong-gi	Namyang Planning Co., Ltd.	Traditional	Theatrical		December 11, 1980	75 minutes
The Legend of Marine Snow マリンスノーの伝説 (Marine Snow no Densetsu)	Japan	Fumio Ikeno	TV Asahi; NOW Planning; Studio Oka	Traditional	Television film		August 12, 1980	111 minutes
The Little Train; Il Trenino nel Pianeta Favola	Italy	Luciano Gregoretti; Sergio Minuti	URBS Film	Traditional	Theatrical		July 26, 1980	89 minutes
Makoto-chan まことちゃん	Japan	Tsutomu Shibayama	Tokyo Movie Shinsha	Traditional	Theatrical		July 26, 1980	85 minutes
The Missing Link; Le Chaînon manquant	France; Belgium	Picha	Pils Films	Traditional	Theatrical		May 21, 1980	95 minutes
Nobody's Boy: Remi 家なき子 (Ie Naki Ko)	Japan	Osamu Dezaki	Tokyo Movie Shinsha	Traditional	Theatrical	Film compiled from TV episodes	March 15, 1980	96 minutes
Phoenix 2772 火の鳥2772 愛のコスモゾーン (Hi no Tori 2772: Ai no Kosumozōn)	Japan	Taku Sugiyama	Toho; Tezuka Productions	Traditional	Theatrical		March 15, 1980	121 minutes
Pinocchio's Christmas	United States; Japan	Jules Bass; Arthur Rankin Jr.	Rankin/Bass; Video Tokyo Production	Stop motion	Television special		December 3, 1980	49 minutes
Pogo for President: 'I Go Pogo'	United States	Marc Paul Chinoy	O.G.P.I. Inc. Possum Productions Inc. Stowmar Enterprises; World Entertainment Corp.	Stop motion	Theatrical		August 1, 1980	86 minutes
The Return of the King	United States; Japan	Arthur Rankin Jr. Jules Bass	Rankin/Bass; Topcraft	Traditional	Television film		May 11, 1980	98 minutes
Scruffy	United States	Charles A. Nichols	Ruby-Spears	Traditional	Television special	Originally aired on the ABC anthology series ABC Weekend Special as a three-part installment on the series' sixth season.	October 4–18, 1980	72 minutes
A Snow White Christmas	United States	Kay Wright	Filmation	Traditional	Television special		December 19, 1980	60 minutes
Sonyeon 007 Eunhateukgongdae 소년 007 은하특공대 (Boy 007 Galaxy Commando)	South Korea	Lim Jung-kyu; Seo Gyeong-jung	Cape Production	Traditional	Theatrical		December 13, 1980	80 minutes
Tajemnica szyfru Marabuta; The Secret of the Marabut Cipher	Poland	Maciej Wojtyszko	Studio Miniatur Filmowych	Traditional	Theatrical	Compilation film of the Polish animated television series that was produced from 1976 to 1979.	April 1980	76 minutes
The Tale of John and Mary; Pohádka o Honzíkovi a Marence	Czechoslovakia	Karel Zeman	Filmové Studio Gottwaldov	Cutout	Theatrical	Last film written and directed by Czech artist and filmmaker Karel Zeman.	November 1, 1980	64 minutes
The Tale of the Three Kingdoms – Breaking Through the Five Gulfs 삼국지 – 관우 오관돌파편	South Korea	Kim Cheong-gi	Song Production	Traditional	Theatrical		July 28, 1980	82 minutes
The Tale of the Three Kingdoms – Oath of the Peach Garden 삼국지 – 도원결의	South Korea	Kim Cheong-gi	Song Production	Traditional	Theatrical		January 16, 1980	84 minutes
The Thralls' Kids; Trællenes Børn	Denmark	Jannik Hastrup	Dansk Tegnefilm	Traditional	Theatrical	Film compiled from TV series episodes	October 14, 1980	81 minutes
Time Machine 001 삼총사 타임머신 001 (Samchongsa Taimmeosin 001)	South Korea	Lim Jung-kyu	Sunwoo Production Co., Ltd.	Traditional	Theatrical	Sequel to last year's Starland Trio (1979); Second installment of the Dreamland Cartoon Theater series.	January 12, 1980	101 minutes
Tomorrow's Joe あしたのジョー (Ashita no Jō)	Japan	Mizubo Nishikubo	Nippon Herald Films; Mushi Production	Traditional	Theatrical	Film compiled from TV series episodes	March 8, 1980	150 minutes
Toward the Terra 地球テラへ… (Tera e...)	Japan	Hideo Onchi	Toei Animation	Traditional	Theatrical		April 26, 1980	115 minutes
The Trouble with Miss Switch	United States	Charles A. Nichols	Ruby-Spears	Traditional	Television special	Originally aired on the ABC anthology series ABC Weekend Special as a two-part installment on the series' third season.	February 16 – 23, 1980	
Twelve Months 世界名作童話 森は生きている (Sekai Meisaku Dōwa: Mori wa Ikiteiru); Двенадцать месяцев (Dvenadtsat mesyatsev)	Japan; Soviet Union	Kimio Yabuki	Toei Animation; Soyuzmultfilm	Traditional	Theatrical	Third film in the anthology film series Sekai Meisaku Dōwa (lit. "World Masterpiece Fairy Tales"); Co-production with Soyuzmultfilm.	March 15, 1980	65 minutes
Twenty-Four Eyes 二十四の瞳 (Nijūshi no Hitomi)	Japan	Akio Jissōji; Shigetsugu Yoshida	Tokyo Movie Shinsha; Fuji TV	Traditional	Television film	Ninth animated special produced for Fuji TV's "Nissei Family Special" program.	October 10, 1980	73 minutes
Ujudaejang aekkunun 우주대장 애꾸눈 (Space Captain Cyclopean)	South Korea	Kim Dae-jung	Central Film Company	Traditional	Theatrical		July 25, 1980	77 minutes
Wakakusa Monogatari 若草物語 (The Tale of Little Women)	Japan	Yūgo Serikawa	Toei Animation; Fuji TV	Traditional	Television film	Seventh animated special produced for Fuji TV's "Nissei Family Special" program.	May 3, 1980	68 minutes
Yogi's First Christmas	United States	Ray Patterson	Hanna-Barbera	Traditional	Television film		November 22, 1980	98 minutes

== Highest-grossing animated films of the year ==
Rank	Title	Studio	Distributor rentals	Ref
1	Doraemon: Nobita's Dinosaur	Shin-Ei Animation	¥1,550,000,000	
2	Be Forever Yamato	Toei Company	¥1,350,000,000	

== See also ==
- List of animated television series of 1980
