= 1980 in animation =

Events in 1980 in animation.

== Events ==
=== January ===
- January 6: The first episode of The Adventures of Tom Sawyer airs, an anime adaptation of Mark Twain's The Adventures of Tom Sawyer.
- January 8: The first episode of The Wonderful Adventures of Nils airs, an anime adaptation of Selma Lagerlöf's novel Nils Holgersson. It is the first production of Studio Pierrot.

=== February ===
- February 1: The Olympic Games special Animalympics, directed by Steven Lisberger, is first broadcast. However, its second part was never broadcast due to Jimmy Carter deciding that the United States would boycott the 1980 Olympic Games in Moscow out of protest against the Russian invasion of Afghanistan.
- February 25: The Peanuts TV special She's a Good Skate, Charlie Brown premieres on CBS.

=== March ===
- March 15:
  - Warner Bros. Animation was rebranded.
  - Doraemon: Nobita's Dinosaur, the first animated feature based on the Doraemon franchise, premieres.
- March 19: Paul Grimault's Le Roi et l'Oiseau (The King and the Mockingbird) premieres after more than 30 years of production. It becomes a critically acclaimed classic.

=== April ===
- April 14: 52nd Academy Awards: Every Child by Derek Lamb wins the Academy Award for Best Animated Short.

=== May ===
- May 15: Julien Temple's The Great Rock 'n' Roll Swindle premieres, a film starring The Sex Pistols which occasionally features animated sequences, produced by Animation City.
- May 21:
  - Picha's film The Missing Link premieres.
  - Chuck Jones' Looney Tunes TV special Bugs Bunny's Bustin' Out All Over premieres on CBS. The special included 3 new cartoon shorts: Portrait of the Artist as a Young Bunny, Spaced Out Bunny, & Soup or Sonic.
- May 30: The Peanuts film Bon Voyage, Charlie Brown (and Don't Come Back!!) premieres. This was the last Peanuts film to be released until 2015's The Peanuts Movie.

=== August ===
- August 2: The film Be Forever Yamato premieres.

=== September ===
- September 6: The Tom and Jerry Comedy Show, the second cartoon based on Tom and Jerry, airs on CBS. It was since classified as one of the worst made-for-TV Tom and Jerry series and the only one to be produced by Filmation.

=== October ===
- October 1: The animated TV series King Rollo, based on David McKee's children's novels, is first broadcast.
- October 4:
  - The first episode of Heathcliff airs.
  - The first episode of Thundarr the Barbarian airs.
- October 24: The Peanuts TV special Life Is a Circus, Charlie Brown premieres on CBS.

=== November ===
- November 1: Karel Zeman's The Tale of John and Mary is first released.
- November 3: Czech animation director Karel Zeman is awarded with the Order of the Republic by president Gustáv Husák.
- November 8:
  - The first episode of The Fonz and the Happy Days Gang airs.
  - The first episode of Richie Rich airs.
- November 22: The Flintstones spin-off series, The Flintstone Comedy Show, airs on NBC. Several episodes of this unique spin-off appeared on children's entertainment programs in the early 1990s.

=== Specific date unknown ===
- Hurray for Betty Boop, a compilation film of the Betty Boop franchise, was given a limited theatrical release. Resulting its commercial failure, it remains abandoned after the 1984 VHS release until it was uploaded on social media in 2016.

== Films released ==
- January 12 - Time Machine 001 (South Korea)
- January 16 - The Tale of the Three Kingdoms – Oath of the Peach Garden (South Korea)
- January 17 - Colargol and the Wonderful Suitcase (Poland)
- February 1 - Animalympics (United States)
- February 3 - Back to the Forest (Japan)
- February 16–23 The Trouble with Miss Switch (United States)
- March 8 - Tomorrow's Joe (Japan)
- March 15:
  - Doraemon: Nobita's Dinosaur (Japan)
  - Nobody's Boy: Remi (Japan)
  - Phoenix 2772 (Japan)
  - Twelve Months (Japan and Soviet Union)
- March 19 - The King and the Mockingbird (France)
- April - Tajemnica szyfru Marabuta (Poland)
- April 2 - Captain (Japan)
- April 3 - Galaxy Express 999: Emeraldas the Eternal Traveller (Japan)
- April 6 - Foam Bath (Hungary)
- April 26 - Toward the Terra (Japan)
- May 3:
  - Ganbare!! Tabuchi-kun!! 2nd Gekitō Pennant Race (Japan)
  - Wakakusa Monogatari (Japan)
- May 11 - The Return of the King (United States and Japan)
- May 21 - The Missing Link (France and Belgium)
- May 30 - Bon Voyage, Charlie Brown (and Don't Come Back!!) (United States)
- June 13 - Botchan (Japan)
- July 19:
  - 3000 Leagues in Search of Mother (Japan)
  - Eleven Hungry Cats (Japan)
- July 25 - Ujudaejang aekkunun (South Korea)
- July 26:
  - Doksuri 5 Hyeongje (South Korea)
  - The Little Train (Italy)
  - Makoto-chan (Japan)
- July 27 - 15 Sonyeon Uju Pyoryugi (South Korea)
- July 28 - The Tale of the Three Kingdoms – Breaking Through the Five Gulfs (South Korea)
- August 1 - Pogo for President: 'I Go Pogo' (United States)
- August 2 - Be Forever Yamato (Japan)
- August 12 - The Legend of Marine Snow (Japan)
- August 19 - Dracula: Sovereign of the Damned (Japan)
- August 25 - Ikkyū-san: Ōabare no Yancha-hime (Japan)
- August 31 - Fumoon (Japan)
- October 2 - Galaxy Express 999: Can You Love Like a Mother!! (Japan)
- October 4–18 - Scruffy (United States)
- October 10 - Twenty-Four Eyes (Japan)
- October 14 - The Thralls' Kids (Denmark)
- November 1 - The Tale of John and Mary (Czechoslovakia)
- November 11 - Gnomes (United States)
- November 21 - Betty Boop for President (United States)
- November 22 - Yogi's First Christmas (United States)
- December 3 - Pinocchio's Christmas (United States and Japan)
- December 11 - Kkomaeosa Ttori (South Korea)
- December 13:
  - Ganbare!! Tabuchi-kun!! Hatsu Warai 3rd Aa Tsuppari Jinsei (Japan)
  - Sonyeon 007 Eunhateukgongdae (South Korea)
- December 19 - A Snow White Christmas (United States)
- December 20 - Cyborg 009: Legend of the Super Galaxy (Japan)
- December 25 - Gaegujangi Cheonsadeul (South Korea)
- Specific date unknown - Bloody Lady (Czechoslovakia)

== Television series ==
- January 6 - The Adventures of Tom Sawyer debuts on Fuji TV.
- January 7 - The Littl' Bits debuts on TV Tokyo.
- January 8 - The Wonderful Adventures of Nils debuts on NHK.
- January 9 - Maeterlinck's Blue Bird: Tyltyl and Mytyl's Adventurous Journey debuts on Fuji TV.
- February 2:
  - Rescueman debuts on Fuji TV.
  - Trider G7 debuts on Nagoya TV.
- February 4 - Monchhichi debuts on TV Tokyo.
- February 15 - Lalabel, The Magical Girl debuts on TV Asahi..
- March 19 - Space Emperor God Sigma debuts on JAITS (Note: Tokyo Channel 12 was an independent station at the time of broadcast.) (Tokyo Channel 12).
- April 4 - Mu No Hakugei debuts on Yomiuri TV.
- April 6 - King Arthur: Prince on White Horse debuts on Fuji TV.
- April 7 - Tsurikichi Sampei debuts on Fuji TV.
- April 15 - Zukkoke Knight Don De La Mancha debuts on Tokyo Channel 12.
- May 6 - Cockleshell Bay debuts on ITV.
- May 8 - Space Runaway Ideon debuts on Tokyo Channel 12.
- June 30 - Space Warrior Baldios debuts on Tokyo Channel 12.
- July 16 - Ganbare Genki debuts on Fuji TV.
- September 2 - Kaibutsu-kun 2 debuts on TV Asahi.
- September 6: Drak Pack and The Tom and Jerry Comedy Show debut on CBS.
- September 7 - Muteking, The Dashing Warrior debuts on Fuji TV.
- September 8 - Force Five debuts in syndication.
- September 13:
  - Super Friends debuts on ABC.
  - The Lone Ranger and The Tarzan/Lone Ranger Adventure Hour debut on CBS.
- September 16 - Sport Billy debuts in syndication.
- September 18 - Magyar népmesék debuts on Magyar Televízió.
- September 20 - Hanna-Barbera's World of Super Adventure debuts in syndication.
- September 28 - Ojamanga Yamada-kun debuts on Fuji TV.
- October 1:
  - Astro Boy debuts on Nippon TV.
  - King Rollo debuts on BBC1.
- October 3 - Shin Tetsujin 28-Go debuts on Nippon TV.
- October 4:
  - Dingbat and the Creeps and Thundarr the Barbarian debut on ABC.
  - X-Bomber debuts on Fuji TV.
- October 11 - Space Battleship Yamato III debuts on Yomiuri TV.
- October 13:
  - The Amazing Adventures of Morph debuts on CBBC.
  - Ashita no Joe 2 debuts on Nippon TV.
- November 8: Scooby-Doo and Scrappy-Doo, The Richie Rich/Scooby-Doo Show, and The Fonz and the Happy Days Gang debut on ABC.
- November 22 - The Flintstone Comedy Show debuts on NBC.
- Specific date unknown:
  - Archibald le Magi-chien debuts on TF1.
  - Aubrey debuts on ITV.

== Births ==
=== January ===
- January 4:
  - Greg Cipes, American actor (voice of Beast Boy in Teen Titans, Teen Titans Go!, and Young Justice, Kevin Levin in the Ben 10 franchise, Chiro in Super Robot Monkey Team Hyperforce Go!, Iron Fist in Ultimate Spider-Man, Michelangelo in multiple Teenage Mutant Ninja Turtles media, Jake in SciGirls).
  - June Diane Raphael, American actress, comedian, and screenwriter (voice of Devin LeSeven in Big Mouth, Suze in American Dad!, Babe in Big City Greens, Queen Paolana in the Star Trek: Lower Decks episode "Where Pleasant Fountains Lie", Eurynomos' Wife in the Krapopolis episode "Hades Nut", Bella "Big" Bucks in The Loud House episode "Can't Lynn Em All", Marcy Muzzler in the Moon Girl and Devil Dinosaur episode "Like Mother, Like Moon Girl").
- January 16: Lin-Manuel Miranda, American actor (voice of Fenton Crackshell-Cabrera/Gizmoduck in DuckTales), singer and songwriter (Moana, Vivo, Encanto).
- January 17: Zooey Deschanel, American actress and musician (voice of Lani Aliikai in Surf's Up, Bridget in the Trolls franchise, Mary Spuckler and Quirk Girl in The Simpsons).
- January 18:
  - Estelle, English singer and actress (voice of Garnet in the Steven Universe franchise, performed the theme song of We Bare Bears).
  - Jason Segel, American actor (voice of Vector in Despicable Me, Marshall Eriksen in the Family Guy episode "Peter's Progress").
- January 21: Nana Mizuki, Japanese actress and singer (voice of Hinata Hyuga in Naruto, Tsubomi Hanasaki / Cure Blossom in HeartCatch PreCure!, Vanessa Enoteca in Black Clover, Ann Takamaki in Persona 5: The Animation, Kozuki Hiyori in One Piece).
- January 22: Christopher Masterson, American actor and disc jockey (voice of Shane G. in The Wild Thornberrys).
- January 30:
  - Wilmer Valderrama, American actor (voice of the title character in Handy Manny, Gaxton in Onward, Agustín Madrigal in Encanto).
  - Lena Hall, American actress and singer (voice of "Dog Gone" Female Performer in Nature Cat, One-Night Stand in the BoJack Horseman episode "Yesterdayland", Countess Coloratura in the My Little Pony: Friendship Is Magic episode "The Mane Attraction", Can of Tuna singer in the Sausage Party: Foodtopia episode "Fourth Course").
- January 31: James Adomian, American comedian and actor (voice of Captain Huggyface in WordGirl, the President of the Planet in Pig Goat Banana Cricket, the title character in Future-Worm!, Bernie Sanders, Ted Cruz, and Bill Clinton in Our Cartoon President, Phineas Phage in The Venture Bros., Bane in Harley Quinn, Randy in Close Enough, Buck Leatherleaf in the Amphibia episode "Girl Time", Jimmy Kimmel in the Celebrity Deathmatch episode "The Banter Bloodbath", Ogdoad in the Adventure Time episode "The Suitor", Imperial Captain in the Star Wars Rebels episode "The Forgotten Droid").

=== February ===
- February 12: Christina Ricci, American actress (voice of Gwendy Doll in Small Soldiers, Lilly in Alpha and Omega, Vexy in The Smurfs 2, Yellow in The Hero of Color City, Terra in Teen Titans: The Judas Contract, Erin in The Simpsons episode "Summer of 4 Ft. 2", Princess Ponietta and Kathy Ireland in the Rick and Morty episode "Rickdependence Spray", Catwoman in the Batman: Caped Crusader episode "Kiss of the Catwoman").
- February 17:
  - Jason Ritter, American actor (voice of Dipper Pines in Gravity Falls, Ryder in Frozen II, Mr. Fisk in All Grown Up!, Captain Jonathan Fall in Captain Fall, Barrel in the Amphibia episode "The Core & the King").
  - Zachary Bennett, Canadian actor (voice of Zach Varmitech and Gaston Gourmand in Wild Kratts, Lorne in Anne of Green Gables: The Animated Series, Biffy Goldstein in Detentionaire, Mr. Plink in Esme & Roy, Coach Clydesdale in Corn & Peg).
- February 21: Justin Roiland, American actor, animator, writer, producer, and director (voice of Blendin Blandin in Gravity Falls, Lemongrab in Adventure Time, Oscar in Fish Hooks, Korvo in Solar Opposites, co-creator and first voice of Rick Sanchez and Morty Smith in Rick and Morty).
- February 22: Haven Paschall, American voice actress and singer, (Pokémon XY).
- February 28: Charles Halford, American actor (voice of Bibbo Bibbowski in The Death of Superman and Reign of the Supermen, Vladimir in Rapunzel's Tangled Adventure, Gang Leader in the Blade Runner: Black Lotus episode "City of Angels").

=== March ===
- March 2: Rebel Wilson, Australian actress, comedian and producer (voice of Raz in Ice Age: Continental Drift, Announcer in The Tiny Chef Show).
- March 9: Matthew Gray Gubler, American actor (voice of Winsor in Scooby-Doo! Legend of the Phantosaur, Riddler in Batman: Assault on Arkham, Jimmy Olsen in All-Star Superman).
- March 31: Kate Micucci, American actress (voice of Sadie Miller in Steven Universe, Webby Vanderquack in DuckTales, Sara Murphy in Milo Murphy's Law, Dr. Fox in Unikitty!, Daisy in Nature Cat, Terri in Amphibia, Luhley in Ben 10: Omniverse, continued voice of Velma Dinkley in the Scooby-Doo franchise).

=== April ===
- April 8: Katee Sackhoff, American actress (voice of She-Hulk in The Super Hero Squad Show, Bo-Katan Kryze in the Star Wars franchise, Poison Ivy in Batman: The Long Halloween, Grrrl in the Futurama episode "Lrrreconcilable Ndndifferences", herself in The Cleveland Show episode "Hot Cocoa Bang Bang").
- April 10: Jasika Nicole, American actress (voice of Reina in Danger & Eggs, Vixen in Justice League Action).
- April 13: Colleen Clinkenbeard, American actress (voice of Riza Hawkeye and Rose Thomas in Fullmetal Alchemist, Rachel Moore in Case Closed, Esther Blanchett in Trinity Blood, Eclair in Kiddy Grade, Monkey D. Luffy in One Piece, Erza Scarlet in Fairy Tail, Momo Yaoyorozu / Creati in My Hero Academia).
- April 24: Reagan Gomez-Preston, American actress (voice of Roberta Tubbs in The Cleveland Show, Jenny Pizza and Kiki Pizza in Steven Universe, Mikayla in Infinity Train, Hailey and Mrs. Munoz in 10 Year Old Tom, Jessica's Friend, Pregnant Girl on TV and Pregnant Girl on TV's Friend in the Rick and Morty episode "Rick Potion No. 9").
- April 26: Channing Tatum, American actor (voice of George Washington in America: The Motion Picture, Superman in The Lego Movie franchise, Migo in Smallfoot, Joaquin in The Book of Life).

=== May ===
- May 2:
  - Vincent Tong, Canadian voice actor (voice of Kai in Ninjago, Mega Man and Namagem in Mega Man: Fully Charged, Mandarin in Iron Man: Armored Adventures, Garble and Sandbar in My Little Pony: Friendship Is Magic, Flash Sentry in Equestria Girls, Matsuda in Death Note).
  - Ellie Kemper, American actress and comedian (voice of Katie in The Secret Life of Pets franchise, Phyllis in The Lego Batman Movie, Smurf Blossom in Smurfs: The Lost Village).
- May 4: Lauren Montgomery, American storyboard artist, film and television director, and character designer (Warner Bros. Animation, The Avengers: Earth's Mightiest Heroes, The Legend of Korra, Voltron: Legendary Defender).
- May 24: Sabrina Alberghetti, Canadian animator, storyboard artist (Ed, Edd n Eddy, WildBrain Studios, The Hollow, DC Super Hero Girls, The Wonderful World of Mickey Mouse) and director (Chibiverse).
- May 27: Ben Feldman, American actor (voice of Tylor Tuskmon in Monsters at Work, Chris in Big Hero 6: The Series).

=== June ===
- June 9: Matthew Margeson, American musician, composer, and arranger (DreamWorks Animation, Transformers: Prime, Alice's Wonderland Bakery, Star Wars: Young Jedi Adventures).
- June 10: Jessica DiCicco, American actress (voice of the title character in The Buzz on Maggie, Lexi Bunny in Loonatics Unleashed, Malina in The Emperor's New School, Flame Princess in Adventure Time, Tambry and Giffany in Gravity Falls, Lynn and Lucy Loud in The Loud House, Hanazuki in Hanazuki: Full of Treasures, Summer Penguin in Muppet Babies, April, May, and June in Legend of the Three Caballeros, Gwen in The Mighty B!, Grotta in Sofia the First, Bug in Future-Worm!, Hissy in Puppy Dog Pals, Annie Bramley in It's Pony, Candice in Close Enough, Frightwig in Ben 10).
- June 12: Kawa Ada, Afghan-Canadian actor, writer and producer (voice of Razaq in The Breadwinner).
- June 13: Abbey McBride, American actress (voice of Ling-Ling in Drawn Together, Mackenzie B in Golan the Insatiable, Temperance Brennan, Lindsey and Candy Cane Eater in American Dad!, Loud Carol in Santa Inc.).
- June 23: Melissa Rauch, American actress (voice of Harley Quinn in Batman and Harley Quinn, Tizzy in Sofia the First, Beth Bayani in Firebuds, Marie Antoinette in the Animaniacs episode "France France Revolution", Mollie in the Jake and the Never Land Pirates episode "Smee-erella", the title character in the Star vs. the Forces of Evil episode "Baby").
- June 26: Jason Schwartzman, American actor and musician (voice of Ash in Fantastic Mr. Fox, Jesper in Klaus, Arcangelo Corelli in Neo Yokio, Uncle Sam in Duncanville, Jonathan Ohnn/Spot in Spider-Man: Across the Spider-Verse).
- June 27: Ben Bocquelet, French-British animator (The Little Short-Sighted Snake), writer (The Hell's Kitchen), producer and director (creator of The Amazing World of Gumball).

=== July ===
- July 1: Fortune Feimster, American actress and comedian (voice of Brenda in Bless the Harts, Ava in Summer Camp Island, Brohilda in the Niko and the Sword of Light episode "The Thorn of Contention", Evelyn in The Simpsons episode "Livin La Pura Vida", Counselor D in Soul, Nibbles in Zootopia 2).
- July 3: Olivia Munn, American actress (voice of Koko in The Lego Ninjago Movie, Captain Callisto in Miles from Tomorrowland, Lady Bullseye in Hit-Monkey, Thomas Edison in America: The Motion Picture, Liz Wilson in the Robot Chicken episode "Kramer vs. Showgirls").
- July 7: Michelle Kwan, American retired figure skater (voice of Shopkeeper in Mulan II, Michelle Kwanzleberry in the Wow! Wow! Wubbzy! episode "Run for Fun", herself in the Family Guy episode "A Hero Sits Next Door", the Arthur episode "The Good Sport", and The Simpsons episode "Homer and Ned's Hail Mary Pass").
- July 10: James Rolfe, American filmmaker, actor, producer and internet personality (voice of Bimmy in the Smiling Friends episode "Charlie Dies and Doesn't Come Back").
- July 17: Brett Goldstein, British actor, comedian and writer (voice of Tony Stark in the Robot Chicken episode "May Cause Light Cannibalism", himself in the Harley Quinn episode "A Very Problematic Valentine's Day Special").
- July 18:
  - Kristen Bell, American actress (voice of Anna in the Frozen franchise Ralph Breaks the Internet and Once Upon a Studio, Hiromi in The Cat Returns, Cora in Astro Boy, Harper Jambowski and the singing voice of Marge Simpson in The Simpsons, Priscilla in Zootopia, Jade Wilson in Teen Titans Go! To the Movies, Molly Tillerman in season 1 of Central Park, Ruthie in the BoJack Horseman episode "Ruthie").
  - Mike Yank, American television producer and writer (Animation Collective, Out of Jimmy's Head, The Drinky Crow Show, Disney Television Animation, The Problem Solverz, Johnny Test, Care Bears: Welcome to Care-a-Lot, Breadwinners, Dawn of the Croods, Harvey Girls Forever!).
- July 19: Chris Sullivan, American actor and musician (voice of Bane in Merry Little Batman, Behemoth in Megamind vs. the Doom Syndicate, Gunther and Teddy in Amphibia, Santa Claus in the Where's Waldo? episode "A Wanderer Christmas", Grogg and Steve in Vampirina, Taserface in the What If...? episode "What If... T'Challa Became a Star-Lord?", Jerry in the American Dad! episode "Viced Principal").
- July 20:
  - Adam Muto, American writer, storyboard artist, animator, and producer (Cartoon Network Studios).
  - Beth Chalmers, British voice actress (voice of One, Three, Five and Sixteen in Numberblocks)

=== August ===
- August 19: Aaron Horvath, American animator, television writer, producer, and director (Teen Titans Go!, The Super Mario Bros. Movie).
- August 26:
  - Macaulay Culkin, American actor (portrayed and voiced Richard Tyler in The Pagemaster, voice of Nicholas McClary in Wish Kid, Bastian Bux, Kevin McCallister, Billy and Kid in Robot Chicken, Downtown Pat in Entergalactic, Cattrick Lynxley in Zootopia 2).
  - Chris Pine, American actor (voice of Jack Frost in Rise of the Guardians, Spider-Man in Spider-Man: Into the Spider-Verse, King Magnifico in Wish, Dr. Deviso in SuperMansion, Alistair Covax in the American Dad! episode "Rabbit Ears", second voice of Dave in Quantum Quest: A Cassini Space Odyssey).

=== September ===
- September 29: Zachary Levi, American actor (voice of Flynn Rider in the Tangled franchise, Joseph in The Star, Larry Daly in Night at the Museum: Kahmunrah Rises Again, Rocky in Chicken Run: Dawn of the Nugget).

=== October ===
- October 1: Sarah Drew, American actress (voice of Stacy Rowe in Daria).
- October 3: Nick Cannon, American actor, comedian, rapper, and television host (voice of Louis in Garfield: The Movie, Officer Lester in Monster House).
- October 4: Lucian Piane, American composer (Wallykazam), (d. 2026).
- October 8: Mike Mizanin, American pro wrestler and actor (voiced himself in Scooby-Doo! WrestleMania Mystery and Scooby-Doo! and WWE: Curse of the Speed Demon, Steve in Hamster & Gretel).
- October 17: Justin Shenkarow, American actor (voice of Harold Berman in Hey Arnold!, Patch in 101 Dalmatians: The Series, Eddie Horton in Lloyd in Space, Gelman in Recess, Rhino in Spidey and His Amazing Friends).
- October 18:
  - Natasha Rothwell, American writer, actress, and comedian (voice of Sakina in Wish, Zan Owlson in DuckTales, Mommy Shark in Baby Shark's Big Show!, Kaya in Archer, Brunzetta in Star vs. the Forces of Evil, Candice Green in The Ghost and Molly McGee, Japonaloid in Aqua Teen Forever: Plantasm, Terry Toucan in Tuca & Bertie, Clemelia Bloodsworth in the BoJack Horseman episode "Time's Arrow", Erin in The Simpsons episode "Uncut Femmes").
  - Pinar Toprak, Turkish-American composer, conductor and musician (PAW Patrol: The Mighty Movie, Us Again).

=== November ===
- November 2: Brittany Ishibashi, Japanese-American actress (voice of Akemi and Jorōgumo in Teenage Mutant Ninja Turtles, Kihu in Mickey Mouse Mixed-Up Adventures, Amaten in Oni: Thunder God's Tale).
- November 17: Stuart Stone, Canadian actor (voice of Ralphie Tennelli in The Magic School Bus, Peter Walker in Care Bears Nutcracker Suite, Hip Koopa in The Adventures of Super Mario Bros. 3 and Super Mario World, Bentley Raccoon in The Raccoons, Charles / Brainchild in The Tick episode "Coach Fussell's Lament").
- November 29: Janina Gavankar, American actress (voice of Niki in Quantum Quest: A Cassini Space Odyssey, Kensington in The Mighty Ones, Pav-Ti in the Tales of the Jedi episode "Life and Death").

=== December ===
- December 3: Anna Chlumsky, American actress (voice of Charlotte Pickles in Rugrats).
- December 18:
  - Christina Aguilera, American singer and songwriter (voice of Akiko Glitter in The Emoji Movie, Rastafarian Jellyfish in Shark Tale).
  - Baron Vaughn, American actor and comedian (voice of Donatello in Batman vs. Teenage Mutant Ninja Turtles, Moon in Right Now Kapow, Captain Maier in Star Trek: Lower Decks).
- December 19: Jake Gyllenhaal, American actor (voice of Searcher Clade in Strange World, Jim Prescott in Spirit Untamed).
- December 30: Eliza Dushku, American retired actress (voice of She-Hulk in Hulk and the Agents of S.M.A.S.H., Catwoman in Batman: Year One, Shockzana in the Robotomy episode "From Wretchneya with Love", herself in The Cleveland Show episode "Hot Cocoa Bang Bang").

=== Specific date unknown ===
- Charles Demers, Canadian actor (voice of Dirk in The Last Kids on Earth, Night Light in the My Little Pony: Friendship Is Magic episode "Once Upon a Zeppelin").
- Matthew J. Munn, American animator and voice actor (Blue Sky Studios, Sony Pictures Animation, DreamWorks Animation).

== Deaths ==
=== January ===
- January 14: Tadao Nagahama, Japanese director (Star of the Giants, Combattler V, Voltes V, Tōshō Daimos, The Rose of Versailles, Ulysses 31), dies at age 43.
- January 29: Jimmy Durante, American actor, comedian, pianist, and singer (voiced himself in Frosty the Snowman), dies at age 86.
- January 31: Ferdinand Bis, A.K.A. Ferdo Bis, Croatian comics artist and animator, dies at age 69.

=== February ===
- February 17: Robert Stokes, American animator (Harman-Ising, Ub Iwerks, Walt Disney Company, Warner Bros. Cartoons), dies at age 71.

=== March ===
- March 18: Jessica Dragonette, American singer and actress (voice of Persephone in The Goddess of Spring, Princess Glory in Gulliver's Travels), dies at age 80.

=== May ===
- May 2: George Pal, Hungarian-American animator, film director, special effects maker and film producer (Puppetoons, Tulips Shall Grow, John Henry and the Inky-Poo, Tubby the Tuba), dies at age 72.
- May 15: Len Lye, New Zealand film director, sculptor, animator and film director (The Peanut Vendor, A Colour Box, Rainbow Dance, Free Radicals), dies at age 78.
- May 16: Cornett Wood, American animator and lay-out artist (Walt Disney Company, Warner Bros. Cartoons), dies at age 74.
- May 31: Sonny Burke, American composer (Lady and the Tramp), dies at age 66.

=== June ===
- June 16: Bob Nolan, American country singer and actor (sang in the Pecos Bill segment in Melody Time), dies at age 72.

=== August ===
- August 26: Tex Avery, American animator, cartoonist, film director, and voice actor (Warner Bros. Cartoons, Metro-Goldwyn-Mayer cartoon studio), creator or further developer of (Bugs Bunny, Daffy Duck, Porky Pig, Elmer Fudd, Droopy, Screwy Squirrel, The big Bad Wolf, Red Hot Riding Hood, and George and Junior), dies at age 72.

=== September ===
- September 12: Lillian Randolph, American actress and singer (voice of Mammy Two Shoes in Tom and Jerry), dies from cancer at age 81.
- September 21: Lee Millar, American actor (voice of Jim Dear and the Dog Catcher in Lady and the Tramp), dies at age 56.

=== November ===
- November 15: Bill Lee, American playback singer (Walt Disney Animation Studios), dies at age 64.
- November 17: Paul Smith, American animator and film director (Walt Disney Animation Studios, Walter Lantz Productions, Warner Bros. Cartoons), dies at age 74.

=== December ===
- December 8: John Lennon, English musician, singer-songwriter and member of The Beatles (Yellow Submarine), was murdered by Mark David Chapman at age 40.
- December 20: Ben Sharpsteen, American animation director and film producer, (sequence director for Snow White and the Seven Dwarfs, supervising director for Pinocchio and Dumbo, production supervisor for Fantasia, Fun and Fancy Free, Melody Time, The Adventures of Ichabod and Mr. Toad, Cinderella, and Alice in Wonderland), dies at age 85.
- December 29: Alexandra Snezhko-Blotskaya, Russian animator and film director (The Enchanted Boy), dies at age 71.

== See also ==
- 1980 in anime
