= 1980 in anime =

- Years in anime: 1977 1978 1979 1980 1981 1982 1983
- Centuries: 19th century · 20th century · 21st century
- Decades: 1950s 1960s 1970s 1980s 1990s 2000s 2010s
- Years: 1977 1978 1979 1980 1981 1982 1983

The events of 1980 in anime.

== Releases ==
Released	Title	Type	Studio	Director	Notes	Ref
January 6	The Adventures of Tom Sawyer	TV series	Nippon Animation	Hiroshi Saitō		
January 7	The Littl' Bits	TV series	Tatsunoko Production	Masayuki Hayashi		
January 8	The Wonderful Adventures of Nils	TV series	Studio Pierrot	Hisayuki Toriumi, Mamoru Oshii		
January 9	Maeterlinck's Blue Bird: Tyltyl and Mytyl's Adventurous Journey	TV series	Academy Production	Hiroshi Sasagawa		
February 2	Invincible Robo Trider G7	TV series	Nippon Sunrise	Katsutoshi Sasaki		
February 2	Rescueman	TV series	Tatsunoko Productions	Hiroshi Sasagawa		
February 3	Back to the Forest	TV film	Nippon Animation	Yoshio Kuroda		
February 4	Monchhichi Twins	TV series	Ashi Productions	Hiroshi Jinsenji		
February 15	Lalabel	TV series	Toei Animation	Masahiro Sasaki		
March 8	Ashita no Joe: Gekijōban	Film	Tokyo Movie Shinsha	Mizuho Nishikubo		
March 15	Doraemon: Nobita's Dinosaur	Film	Shin-Ei Animation	Hiroshi Fukutomi		
March 15	Nobody's Boy: Remi	Film	Tokyo Movie Shinsha	Osamu Dezaki		
March 15	Phoenix 2772	Film	Tezuka Productions, Kobayashi Production, Toho	Taku Sugiyama		
March 15	Twelve Months	Film	Toei Animation, Soyuzmultfilm	Kimio Yabuki, Tetsuo Imazawa		
March 19	Space Emperor God Sigma	TV series	Toei Animation	Takeyuki Kanda, Katsuhiko Taguchi		
April 2	Captain	TV film	Eiken	Tetsu Dezaki		
April 6	King Arthur: Prince on White Horse	TV series	Toei Animation			
April 7	Tsurikichi Sanpei	TV series	Nippon Animation	Yoshikata Nitta		
April 15	Zukkoke Knight - Don De La Mancha	TV series	Ashi Productions			
April 26	Toward the Terra	Film	Toei Animation	Hideo Onchi		
May 3	Ganbare!! Tabuchi-kun!! 2: Gekitō Pennant Race	Film	Tokyo Movie Shinsha	Tsutomu Shibayama		
May 8	Space Runaway Ideon	TV series	Sunrise	Yoshiyuki Tomino		
June 30	Space Warrior Baldios	TV series	Ashi Productions	Kazuyuki Hirokawa		
July 12	Magical Girl Lalabel: the Sea Calls for a Summer Vacation	TV film	Toei Animation	Hiroshi Shidara		
July 16	Ganbare Genki	TV series	Toei Animation	Rintaro		
July 19	3000 Leagues in Search of Mother	Film	Nippon Animation	Isao Takahata, Hajime Okayasu		
July 26	Makoto-chan	Film	Tokyo Movie Shinsha	Tsutomu Shibayama		
August 2	Be Forever Yamato	TV film	Group TAC, Academy Productions	Leiji Matsumoto, Toshio Masuda		
August 19	Dracula: Sovereign of the Damned	TV film	Toei Animation	Minoru Okazaki		
August 31	Fumoon	Film	Tezuka Productions	Osamu Tezuka		
September 2	Kaibutsu-kun 2	TV series	Shin-Ei Animation	Hiroshi Fukutomi		
September 7	Muteking, The Dashing Warrior	TV series	Tatsunoko Production			
September 28	Ojamanga Yamada-kun	TV series	Nihon Herald Pictures	Hiromitsu Furukawa		
October 1	Astro Boy	TV series	Tezuka Productions	Noburo Ishiguro		
October 3	Taiyō no Shisha Tetsujin Nijūhachi-gō	TV series	Tokyo Movie Shinsha	Tetsuo Imazawa		
October 11	Space Battleship Yamato III	TV series	Group TAC, Academy Productions	Leiji Matsumoto, Noburo Ishiguro		
October 13	Ashita no Joe 2	TV series	Tokyo Movie Shinsha	Masayuki Akebi		
December 13	Ganbare!! Tabuchi-kun!! Hatsu Warai 3: Aa Tsuppari Jinsei	Film	Tokyo Movie Shinsha	Tsutomu Shibayama		
December 20	Chō Ginga Densetsu	Film	Toei Animation	Toshio Takeuchi		

== See also ==
- 1980 in animation
