= List of Rescueman episodes =

This is a list of Rescueman episodes. The anime series was first aired in Japan on Fuji TV from February 2, 1980, to January 31, 1981, and contains fifty-three episodes.

== Episodes ==
No.	Title	Original release date
1	"Otasukeman VS Ojama Man"; Transliteration: "Otasukeman VS Ojama Man" (Japanese: オタスケマンVSオジャママン)	February 2, 1980
2	"Wine Emperor Napoleon?"; Transliteration: "Wain kōtei Naporeon?" (Japanese: ワイン皇帝ナポレオン)	February 9, 1980
3	"Beethoven's Tenth!?"; Transliteration: "Bētōben no Daijū!?" (Japanese: ベートーベンの第十！？)	February 16, 1980
4	"New Members Finally Appear"; Transliteration: "Shin Taijin Iyoiyo Tōjō" (Japanese: 新隊員いよいよ登場)	February 23, 1980
5	"Galileo's New Discovery?!"; Transliteration: "Garireo no Shin Hakken?!" (Japanese: ガリレオの新発見？！)	March 1, 1980
6	"Lincoln's Declaration of Viciousness?!"; Transliteration: "Rinkān no Akutoku Sengen?!" (Japanese: リンカーンの悪徳宣言？！)	March 8, 1980
7	"Fabre's Underwater Chronicles?!"; Transliteration: "Fāburu no Suichū-Ki?!" (Japanese: ファーブルの水中記？！)	March 15, 1980
8	"A Great Race to the South Pole?!"; Transliteration: "Nankyoku-ten Dai Rēsu?!" (Japanese: 南極点大レース？！)	March 22, 1980
9	"Is Yang Guifei a Kind Woman?!"; Transliteration: "Yōhiki wa Yasashī On'na?!" (Japanese: 楊貴妃はやさしい女？！)	March 29, 1980
10	"Lawrence of the Mistake?!"; Transliteration: "Ayamari no Rorensu?!" (Japanese: アヤマリのロレンス？！)	April 5, 1980
11	"Atasha's Rival?!"; Transliteration: "Atāsha no Raibaru?!" (Japanese: アターシャのライバル？！)	April 12, 1980
12	"Rodin's Staring Contest Anyone?!"; Transliteration: "Rodan no Niramekko Suru Hito?!" (Japanese: ロダンのにらめっこする人？！)	April 19, 1980
13	"Ojamaman No. 4 is Born?!"; Transliteration: "Ojamaman 4-gō Tanjō?!" (Japanese: オジャママン4号誕生？！)	April 26, 1980
14	"The Upside-Down Great Buddha of Nara"; Transliteration: "Nara no Mitako no Sakadachi Daibutsu?!" (Japanese: 奈良の都の逆立ち大仏？！)	May 3, 1980
15	"To the Shinsengumi Suez Canal?!"; Transliteration: "Shinsengumi Suezu Unga e?!" (Japanese: 新撰組スエズ運河へ？！)	May 10, 1980
16	"Andersen the Mermaid Tamer?!"; Transliteration: "Ningyo Tsukai Anderusen?!" (Japanese: 人魚使いアンデルセン？！)	May 17, 1980
17	"Franklin Flies an Octopus?!"; Transliteration: "Furankurin no Tako Age?!" (Japanese: フランクリンのタコあげ？！)	May 24, 1980
18	"Tsubasa, is that a False Light?!"; Transliteration: "Tsubasa yo Are wa Uso no Akarida?!" (Japanese: 翼よあれはウソの灯だ？！)	May 31, 1980
19	"Nightingale, the Bar Angel?!"; Transliteration: "Sakaba no Tenshi Naichingēru?!" (Japanese: 酒場の天使ナイチンゲール？！)	June 7, 1980
20	"Bunzaemon's Kerosene Boat?!"; Transliteration: "Bunzaemon no Dēng Yusen?!" (Japanese: 文左衛門の燈油船？！)	June 14, 1980
21	"Meerians, The Mysterious Monsters?!"; Transliteration: "Nazo no Kaibutsu Meērian?!" (Japanese: 謎の怪物メエーリアン？！)	June 21, 1980
22	"The Flower Continent's Suspended Railway?!"; Transliteration: "Hana no Tairiku Chūdan Tetsudō?!" (Japanese: 花の大陸中断鉄道？！)	June 28, 1980
23	"Sekovitch's Time Runaway?!"; Transliteration: "Sekobicchi no Taimu Iede?!" (Japanese: セコビッチのタイム家出？！)	July 5, 1980
24	"The Disappearance of Takeda Shingen?!"; Transliteration: "Kieta Takeda Shingen?!" (Japanese: 消えた武田信玄？！)	July 12, 1980
25	"Recover the Director's Treasure Chest?!"; Transliteration: "Chōkan no Takarabako o Torimodose" (Japanese: 長官の宝箱をとりもどせ？！)	July 19, 1980
26	"The Patrol Team's Summer Vacation"; Transliteration: "Patorōru-tai no Natsuyasumi" (Japanese: パトロール隊の夏休み)	July 26, 1980
27	"Dracula's Terrifying Castle?!"; Transliteration: "Kyōfu no Dorakyura-Jō?!" (Japanese: 恐怖のドラキュラ城？！)	August 2, 1980
28	"The Most Beautiful of the Century All Together?!"; Transliteration: "Seiki no Bijo Zen'in Shūgō?!" (Japanese: 世紀の美女全員集合？！)	August 9, 1980
29	"Hinebot's Father"; Transliteration: "Hinebotto no Otōsan" (Japanese: ヒネボットのお父さん？！)	August 16, 1980
30	"Ieyasu the Tanuki Warrior?!"; Transliteration: "Ieyasu no Tanuki Musha?!" (Japanese: 家康のタヌキ武者？！)	August 23, 1980
31	"A Mysterious UFO Robbery?!"; Transliteration: "UFO Gōtō Kai Jiken?!" (Japanese: UFO強盗怪事件？！)	August 30, 1980
32	"Ojamaman, The Pirate King?!"; Transliteration: "Kaizoku-ō Ojamaman?!" (Japanese: 海賊王オジャママン？！)	September 6, 1980
33	"2001 Letters: A Space Journey?!"; Transliteration: "2001 Bunko no Tabi?!" (Japanese: 2001文宇宙のタビ？！)	September 13, 1980
34	"Atasha and her Mother Reunite in Tears"; Transliteration: "Atāsha Boshi Namida no Saikai" (Japanese: アターシャ母子涙の再開)	September 20, 1980
35	"The Southeast Chief's Sly Daughter"; Transliteration: "Tōnan Chōkan no Chakkari Musume" (Japanese: 東南長官のちゃっかり娘)	September 27, 1980
36	"Tonma no Sando's Delicacies"; Transliteration: "Chinmi Tonma no Sandō?!" (Japanese: 珍味トンマノサンド？！)	October 4, 1980
37	"The Patrol Team's Big Sports Day"; Transliteration: "Patorōru-tai no Dai Undōkai" (Japanese: パトロール隊の大運動会)	October 11, 1980
38	"Nostradamus' Great Prophecy?!"; Transliteration: "Nosutoradamasu no Dai Yogen?!" (Japanese: ノストラダマスの大予言？！)	October 18, 1980
39	"A Rare Sword, Tonman's Three-Sword Style?!"; Transliteration: "Chin Ken Tonmano Santōryū?!" (Japanese: 珍剣トンマノ三刀流？！)	October 25, 1980
40	"Who is Gekigasuki's Ancestor?!"; Transliteration: "Gekigasukī no Senzo wa?!" (Japanese: ゲキガスキーの先祖は？！)	November 1, 1980
41	"Dowalski's First Success?!"; Transliteration: "Dowasukī no Hatsu Tegara?!" (Japanese: ドワルスキーの初手柄？！)	November 8, 1980
42	"Sekovitch's Flower Matchmaking?!"; Transliteration: "Sekobicchi Hana no O Miai?!" (Japanese: セコビッチ花のお見合い？！)	November 15, 1980
43	"Don Saigo's Shiritori Game?!"; Transliteration: "Saigō Don no Shiritobi Asobi?!" (Japanese: 西郷ドンのしりとり遊び？！)	November 22, 1980
44	"Tonmanomanto is the Chief?!"; Transliteration: "Chōkan ga Tonmanomanto?!" (Japanese: 長官がトンマノマント？！)	November 29, 1980
45	"Is Otasukeman a Big Thief?!"; Transliteration: "Otasukeman wa Dai Dorobō?!" (Japanese: オタスケマンは大泥棒？！)	December 6, 1980
46	"Decisive Battle! Ojama Wars"; Transliteration: "Kessen! Ojama Ōzu" (Japanese: 決戦！オジャマウォーズ)	December 13, 1980
47	"Gekigasuki, The Western Hero?!"; Transliteration: "Seibu no Yūsha Gekigasukī?!" (Japanese: 西部の勇者ゲキガスキー？！)	December 20, 1980
48	"Hikaru is Nana's Future Husband?"; Transliteration: "Hikaru ga Nana no Mirai no Otto?" (Japanese: ヒカルがナナの未来の夫？)	December 27, 1980
49	"Everyone, including Atasha is Fired!"; Transliteration: "Atāsha-tachi zen'in Kubi!" (Japanese: アターシャたち全員クビ！)	January 3, 1981
50	"The Patrol Team's Time Excursion"; Transliteration: "Patorōru-tai no Taimu Ensoku" (Japanese: パトロール隊のタイム遠足)	January 10, 1981
51	"No. 2's Apollo Moon Landing?"; Transliteration: "Getsumen Chakuriku Aporo wa 2-ban?" (Japanese: 月面着陸アポロは2番？)	January 17, 1981
52	"Otasukeman's Big Pinch"; Transliteration: "Otasukeman Dai Pinchi!" (Japanese: オタスケマン大ピンチ！)	January 24, 1981
53	"Shine On! The World of Otasukeman" (Japanese: 輝け！世界のオタスケマン)	January 31, 1981
