= List of Galaxy Express 999 episodes =

This is a list of episodes for the Japanese anime television series, Galaxy Express 999, which aired 113 episodes from 14 September 1978 to 26 March 1981. The television series was based on the manga series created by Leiji Matsumoto. Other episodes were based on stories included in other Matsumoto manga, while others were television originals. A compilation film of the same name was released in 1979.

Presently all 113 episodes are available on DVD in Japan, as well as on Blu-ray disc in the United States. The streaming website Crunchyroll began streaming an English subtitled version on January 9, 2009. The series is also available for streaming from Funimation Entertainment's website.

Each episode preview ends with the Conductor (acting as the narrator here) stating: "Jikai no Ginga Tetsudō 999 wa [episode title] ni tomarimasu" ("Next stop for Galaxy Express 999: [episode title]").

== Episode list ==
No.	Title	Original release date
1	"Departure Ballad"; Transliteration: "Tabidachi no Ballad" (Japanese: 出発のバラード)	14 September 1978
Tetsuro's mother is murdered by the villainous Count Mecha while the two are traveling through the snow. Before she dies, Tetsuro's mother tells him to go to the planet Andromeda where he can get a machine body and not die like she did. Tetsuro passes out from the cold but is rescued by the mysterious Maetel, who gives him a free pass to the Galaxy Express 999 on the condition that he travel with her. Tetsuro first travels to Count Mecha's mansion, where he kills him in revenge for his mother's death. Tetsuro and Maetel flee from the police and make it to the 999, which takes off.
2	"The Red Winds of Mars"; Transliteration: "Kasei no Akai Kaze" (Japanese: 火星の赤い風)	21 September 1978
The 999's first stop is the desolate planet Mars. When Tetsuro is provided a tour by a young woman, Freme, her boyfriend Geronimo shoots Tetsuro and steals his 999 pass. Freme doesn't want Geronimo to leave without her, however, and he ends up shooting her. Tetsuro, protected by money in his coat, shoots Geronimo, who gives back the pass. Tetsuro is shocked to find that both had machine bodies, but chose this fate anyway.
3	"The Resting Warriors on Titan"; Transliteration: "Titan no Nemureru Senshi" (Japanese: タイタンの眠れる戦士)	28 September 1978
Tetsuro meets Crystal Claire, a waitress on the 999 that is made entirely of glass. Claire's body was forced upon her by her mother and she is seeking to buy back her original body. Tetsuro finds his mother alive again on the train, but it is actually a monster that tries to pull him out of the train with it. Claire kills the monster by sacrificing herself, shattering her glass body. The 999 arrives on the planet Titan, where Maetel is captured by machine men. Tetsuro meets an old woman who provides him with a hat, cape, gun and boat which he uses to find Maetel.
4	"The Great Bandit Antares"; Transliteration: "Dai Touzoku Antaresu" (Japanese: 大盗賊アンタレス)	5 October 1978
The bandit Antares sneaks aboard the 999 and starts stealing and killing people on board. He meets Tetsuro and Maetel and forces the 999 to travel to his home by holding Tetsuro at gunpoint. At Antares's house, Tetsuro and Maetel meet all his children and hear from him how his wife was killed by machine men. Tetsuro saves Antares when the Conductor tries to kill him, and Maetel deletes the 999's data on the location as they leave.
5	"Shadow, of the Planet of Indecision"; Transliteration: "Mayoi no Hoshi no Shadow" (Japanese: 迷いの星の影)	12 October 1978
The 999 travels to Pluto, also said to be "The Faltering Planet", where the frozen human bodies of the machine people have been laid to rest. There, Maetel visits a frozen body whom she tells Tetsuro was a friend of hers. Tetsuro meets Shadow, the machine woman who is caretaker of the graves. Shadow shows him her frozen human body, a body so beautiful that she refused to have a face on her machine body since it couldn't compare to her human face. Shadow tries to capture Tetsuro to regain her human body, but Maetel saves him. That night, Shadow tricks Tetsuro into traveling outside the city so she can try once again to use his body, this time by taking the form of his mother. Maetel once again tries to rescue Tetsuro and they are able to leave when Tetsuro threatens to destroy Shadow's human body.
6	"The Comet Library"; Transliteration: "Suisei Toshokan" (Japanese: 彗星図書館)	19 October 1978
The 999 arrives at the Comet Library, where all the books published are located. There, a pair of men capture Tetsuro and try to force him into having a machine body, which he'll need to become a servant to repay. Maetel rescues Tetsuro and kills the two men. When they arrive back at the 999, two people try to imitate them and steal their pass, but the Conductor throws them off the train and the 999 departs.
7	"The Graveyard at the Bottom of Gravity - Part 1"; Transliteration: "Juuryoku no Soko no Hakaba - Part 1" (Japanese: 重力の底の墓場前編)	26 October 1978
The 999 falls into the Sargasso, where they find the remains of the 333, a missing train. Traveling aboard, Tetsuro, Maetel and the Conductor find only skeletons. A woman aboard the train, Ryuzu, reveals herself, saying that she sped up time on the train which killed everyone. Through her threats, she takes a hold of Tetsuro and departs the train's remains with him.
8	"The Graveyard at the Bottom of Gravity - Part 2"; Transliteration: "Juuryoku no Soko no Hakaba - Part 2" (Japanese: 重力の底の墓場後編)	2 November 1978
Ryuzu brings Tetsuro to her home. She demands Tetsuro remain with her, showing him the skeletons of those who refused her. Ryuzu offers Tetsuro a machine body, then shows him her beautiful machine body. Ryuzu tells Tetsuro her sad past, of how she was emotionally blackmailed into getting her body by her ex-lover, but then was cruelly abandoned by him when others copied her style. Tetsuro refuses to take a machine body from Ryuzu, saying he wants to earn it himself, and Ryuzu reluctantly permits him to leave.
9	"Trader's Junction - Part 1"; Transliteration: "Trader Bunkiten - Part 1" (Japanese: トレーダー分岐点前編)	9 November 1978
The 999 made a stop on the planet Trader, a junction for different major rail lines. Tetsuro meets a woman in destitute and decided to treat her for a meal, but this angered a mob of similarly impoverished people when he could not extend his generosity. The woman quickly brings him to the safety of her home in the sewer. The episode ends with Tetsuro falling asleep on the watch by his new acquaintance, and Maetel contemplating on his companion's fate. A train headed for the planet Wildflower foreshadows Tetsuro whereabouts. Note: This is the first episode to feature the 777 in the opening.
10	"Trader's Junction - Part 2"; Transliteration: "Trader Bunkiten - Part 2" (Japanese: トレーダー分岐点後編)	16 November 1978
The woman, who reveals her name as Hanako, brings the still asleep Tetsuro to a neighboring planet aptly called Wildflower. They traveled to her home, and were greeted by her aging mother and ailing father. Without Tetsuro's knowledge or consent, Hanako feigned their upcoming marriage, for which Hanako's parents were eager to prepare a banquet. Though Hanako planned to return Tetsuro to Trader before the 999's departure, Maetel also arrived at Wildflower, and retrieved him. Tetsuro found his experience somewhat disagreeable, but Maetel told him that his kindness and willingness had made Hanako and her parents very happy.
11	"Nuruba, the Planet Without Form"; Transliteration: "Futeikei Wakusei Nuruba" (Japanese: 不定形惑星ヌルーバ)	23 November 1978
The 999 arrived at the formless world Naruba, where humans often traveled to end their lives. Two adolescent shape-shifting blobs kidnapped Tetsuro and Maetel and impersonated them for a chance to leave the planet. When the real Tetsuro escaped and warned the Conductor of the shape-shifters, the father of the two blobs appeared and asked them for forgiveness. Even though formlessness was ideal and eternal, the father said, his two children admired the beauty of the human form and wanted to escape the planet. As the 999 departed, a couple could be seen jumping off the train, knowing that in their deaths their love would become eternal.
12	"The Fossilized Warrior - Part 1"; Transliteration: "Kaseki no Senshi - Part 1" (Japanese: 化石の戦士前編)	30 November 1978
The 999 arrives on a planet where the entire populace except for one person have been turned to stone by a fossilized gas cloud. The one person still alive, a warrior, attacks Tetsuro and steals his pass, hoping to use it to escape and find a cure for his lover, who was turned to stone. This episode was used as part of the TV special Can You Live Like a Warrior.
13	"The Fossilized Warrior - Part 2"; Transliteration: "Kaseki no Senshi - Part 2" (Japanese: 化石の戦士後編)	7 December 1978
Additional people arrive on the planet who seek to steal the petrified remains of the warrior's lover. With Tetsuro and Maetel's help, he fights them off and Tetsuro gets his pass back. The warrior is killed however, and is laid to rest beside his lover's remains. The 999 manages to escape just as fossilized gas cloud approaches the planet again. This episode was used as part of the TV special Can You Live Like a Warrior.
14	"Lala of the Dual Planets"; Transliteration: "Nijuu Wakusei Lara" (Japanese: 二重惑星のラーラ)	14 December 1978
The 999 arrives at the Dual Planets, a world full of machine people. When a large group of machine people at a restaurant treat Tetsuro and Maetel rudely, Tetsuro goes on a rampage and kills them all. Tetsuro and Maetel then meet Lala, a machine woman who steals Tetsuro's body, switching it with her own. When Maetel tells her to switch the bodies back, she instead brings them to a doctor who tries to steal Maetel's body. Luckily Maetel is able to force them to switch Tetsuro's body back, then she blows up both planets as they depart.
15	"Beethoven of the Water Planet"; Transliteration: "Mizu no Kuni no Beethoven" (Japanese: 水の国のベートーベン)	21 December 1978
The 999 is pursued by the Black Knight, a caped figure in a dark, fog drenched world. The Black Knight requests Tetsuro stay on the planet and be his friend, but when Tetsuro refuses, he attacks, and Maetel takes the blow, seemingly dying. Tetsuro kills the Black Knight, who actually has a cheap, fragile machine body which was all he could afford due to purchasing this planet. When Tetsuro returns to the 999 he finds Maetel miraculously unharmed. They then travel to the planet 4D-3 where the son of an innkeeper, a musician, desires Tetsuro's pass so he can leave the planet.
16	"The Streets of Fireflies"; Transliteration: "Hotaru no Machi" (Japanese: 螢の街)	28 December 1978
On their latest planet, Tetsuro meets Freiya, a poor girl who appears beautiful to him but is considered ugly and deformed by the other inhabitants of her planet because she does not glow in the dark with a uniform light. Freiya is an amateur animator who hopes to become a director someday. Tetsuro buys a film storyboard based on her deceased cat, and gives it back to her so she can use it to make it into a movie someday.
17	"The Armored Planet"; Transliteration: "Soukou Wakusei" (Japanese: 装甲惑星)	4 January 1979
The 999 arrives on a planet where everything is encased in armor, including a panzer beetle that severely wounds Maetel. Tetsuro travels the planet, searching for a doctor who can help her. The doctor however is too old to help, and his son, who is the only other person left alive on the planet tries to kill Tetsuro. Tetsuro is saved by Maetel, who was magically healed by a mysterious force aboard the 999. Maetel explains to Tetsuro as they leave that beings are dependent on weaker beings to eat, and with everything armored on this planet, they all died out because every being was armored and strong.
18	"Maetel of Mud"; Transliteration: "Doro no Meitel" (Japanese: 泥のメーテル)	11 January 1979
The 999 arrives on a planet containing a large mud pit that Maetel warns Tetsuro to not go near. When he does, Tetsuro is dragged into the pit and forced to live in a bubble with a woman who also calls herself Maetel. When a reward is offered, the woman brings Tetsuro back to the 999, and as a reward demands Tetsuro himself. She is permitted passage on the 999, but soon crumbles into mud. The real Maetel explains that since she was in the mud pit for so long, her body became dependent on it to stay in that form.
19	"The Land of Confession"; Transliteration: "Zange no Kuni" (Japanese: ざんげの国)	18 January 1979
The 999 made a two-week stop to the Planet of Confession, a world supposedly free of all evils. While the Conductor decided to take his holidays on the planet, a robber appeared and took all of his money. The incident was made aware by the "Cleaningless Committee". Instead of catching the perpetrator, the committee decided to uphold the planet's reputation by trying to silence the three travelers, first by brainwashing, followed by bribery and finally by killing. The Conductor captured a committee agent and, upon learning their intentions, rescued Tetsuro and Maetel and returned to the 999.
20	"Professional Spirit"; Transliteration: "Professional Tamashii" (Japanese: プロフェッショナル魂)	25 January 1979
The 999 travels to a planet full of professionals, and Maetel warns Tetsuro not to look anyone in the eye. When Tetsuro does so, he is captured by a professional hangman who tries to hang Tetsuro. Tetsuro is saved when another professional, a gunman arrives and shoots the hangman. This professional however insists on teaching Tetsuro to become a professional dueler until Maetel arrives and rescues Tetsuro.
21	"The Tombstone of Dry Leaves"; Transliteration: "Kareha no Bohyou" (Japanese: 枯葉の墓標)	1 February 1979
The 999 arrives at a hollow planet with no gravity; as a result everything is a lot fatter looking, and can float through the air. Tetsuro and Maetel are confronted by cattle keepers but are able to escape. As they travel to their next planet Tetsuro meets an artist who has a wooden machine body. When they travel through a planet full of leaves, an electric mushroom threatens to destroy the train, and the artist sacrifices himself to save the train.
22	"The Pirate Ship Queen Emeraldas"; Transliteration: "Kaizokusen Queen Emeraldas" (Japanese: 海賊船クイーン·エメラルダス)	8 February 1979
The 999 is attacked by the pirate ship Queen Emeraldas, which forces the train to a pirate planet. There, Tetsuro and Maetel are captured by the pirate Emeraldas, a caped woman who desires Maetel's body. Maetel is knocked out when she falls out of the ship to the ground during a duel with Emeraldas. While Emeraldas seeks to switch her body with Maetel's, Tetsuro wanders through the ship and finds the real Emeraldas, who is ill and in bed. The real Emeraldas reveals that the one who captured them was her robot copy. Maetel and Tetsuro destroy the robot copy and say farewell to Emeraldas. This episode was used as part of the TV special Emeraldes the Eternal Wanderer.
23	"The Queen of the Primitive Planet"; Transliteration: "Genshi Wakusei Joou" (Japanese: 原始惑星の女王)	15 February 1979
The 999 arrives at the Battle Torn Planet, a planet that was split in two due to arguments over whether the planet should be scientifically advanced or primitive. Soon after disembarking, Tetsuro is kidnapped and Maetel is viewed as Queen by the planet's primitive occupants. They try to sacrifice Tetsuro, but Maetel rescues him. They then try to sacrifice her, and Tetsuro's rescue attempt fails. Just after however, volcanic eruptions occur on the planet, enabling them to escape. Shortly after the 999 departs, the remaining half of the planet blows up.
24	"The Planet of Dimensional Voyage"; Transliteration: "Jigen Koukai Wakusei" (Japanese: 次元航海惑星)	22 February 1979
The 999 finds its next destination destroyed; it was demolished by a planet that travels through the dimensions, smashing other planets. When the 999 lands on this planet, they are confronted by the planet's ruler, Egoterina, who is very mentally unstable. For example, she invites Tetsuro, Maetel and the Conductor to her castle for dinner, but has them jailed when Tetsuro is a slob. They escape, and Maetel has a duel with Egoterina in which she defeats her, permitting them to depart the planet.
25	"The Steel Angel"; Transliteration: "Koutetsu Tenshi" (Japanese: 鋼鉄天使)	8 March 1979
Tetsuro meets Clowmaria, a freedom fighter on a heavily industrialized world that is trying to get the people of her planet to change her ways. Clowmaria is captured and set to be executed, but is saved by Tetsuro and Maetel. Clowmaria and her allies sneak aboard the 999 to escape to another planet, but have no passes. Maetel manages to get passes for all of them seconds before the Conductor kicks them off the train, allowing them to stay on board.
26	"The Song of a Skeleton"; Transliteration: "Hakkotsu no Uta" (Japanese: 白骨の歌)	15 March 1979
Tetsuro meets Horohoro, a poor skeleton man who has lost most of his body including his ribs because he is so poor. Tetsuro meets Horohoro's former girlfriend, who has a new lover and makes fun of Horohoro. When Tetsuro travels to Horohoro's home, he knocks Tetsuro out and kills both his former girlfriend and her lover. Tetsuro is accused of the crime and is forced to flee, not wanting to tell on Horohoro.
27	"The Hariti of Snow Metropolis"; Transliteration: "Yuki no Miyako no Kishibojin" (Japanese: 雪の都の鬼子母神)	22 March 1979
After the 999 landed on the five-planet system Snow Capital, Tetsuro and Maetel explored the city. He fell through a hidden hole which led him to the slump part of the city, and was promptly mugged by a group of local residents. Tetsuro spotted a girl, Bojin Yuki, to whom he gave his last bit of biscuit. Yuki then brought him to her home on the surface, but Yuki's mother wanted to cook Tetsuro for food. Maetel appeared to Yuki's house. Upon knowing that Tetsuro had given Yuki food, Yuki's mother returned Tetsuro to Maetel.
28	"The Literary Grand Master of the Planet Mirage"; Transliteration: "Kageroboshi no Bungou" (Japanese: かげろう星の文豪)	29 March 1979
The 999 arrives on a planet where Tetsuro and Maetel meet an old writer who lives alone and has extremely long hair. The old man steals Tetsuro's pass and flees on the 999 with Maetel, leaving Tetsuro on the planet. When the Conductor catches the old man with Tetsuro's pass, which isn't in his name, he has the 999 return to the planet so they can kick him off. Tetsuro is able to re-board the train. Before they leave, the old man requests Maetel stay with him, but she reveals something to him which makes him change is mind and they depart the planet.
29	"The Continent of Sakezan"; Transliteration: "Sakezan Tairiku" (Japanese: サケザン大陸)	5 April 1979
Sakezan is the only human living in a jungle world named after him. He is a parody of Tarzan and, as his name suggests, is very fond of saké. Sakezan captured Maetel when the 999 took a quick stop there and she became her slave/companion. In an attempt to rescue her, Tetsuro was defeated by Sakezan and ended up in a prison cell. He was released by Sakezan's current companion Liza, who was stranded on the planet when her spaceship crash landed. Believing that Sakezan had abandoned her for Maetel, Liza proceeded to the 999 (where she was allowed to board without a pass as a crash victim). Tetsuro was recaptured and locked up once again. He managed to escape and confronted Sakezan before succumbing to exhaustion. Realizing the boy's determination to save Maetel, Sakezan decided to return both to the train. In the meantime, Liza stayed behind with Sakezan, when she realized that she and Sakezan would be lonely and unhappy without each other.
30	"The Phantom World of Filament"; Transliteration: "Yuurei Sekai no Filamento" (Japanese: 幽霊世界のフィラメント)	12 April 1979
The episode opened with the story of the post-modern feudal world of Filament, which was destroyed when its sun went supernova. An energy cloud formed where the planet used to be, and its inhabitants, not accepting their untimely fate, became spirits. When the 999 passed through the energy cloud, the ghosts disabled the train and kidnapped Tetsuro. One of the spirits wanted her son to possess Tetsuro, so that he (the spirit) could travel to the destination and receive a mechanical body. The child spirit refused and insisted on returning Tetsuro to Maetel. The ghosts then released the 999, which proceeded on its journey. Note: This is the first episode to feature the space station terminal in the opening.
31	"The Planet of Passion"; Transliteration: "Dohassei" (Japanese: 怒髪星)	19 April 1979
The 999 arrives at a planet where people are passionate and don't hide their emotions. Meanwhile a group of four assassins are hired by a friend of Count Mecha's to kill Tetsuro. After being attacked by one of the assassins, Tetsuro is severely injured and stays with an old couple. Eventually the last assassin arrives and tries to kill Tetsuro multiple times but he is saved by Maetel.
32	"The Bitten Planet in Suspended Space"; Transliteration: "Teijikuukan no Kajirareboshi" (Japanese: 停時空間のかじられ星)	26 April 1979
Tetsuro meets Edmund, a fellow passenger on the 999 who is looking forward to returning to his homeworld on their next stop. When they arrive the planet is completely ravaged. It is revealed that the government of the planet has been selling much of the land to other planets because it is edible. Edmund attacks the government agents overseeing the removal of land, but is captured. Thanks to Tetsuro and Maetel's involvement, he is freed, and reboards the 999, seeking to find a new home.
33	"Ulatores's Mountain of Screws"; Transliteration: "Ulatores no Neji no Yama" (Japanese: ウラトレスのネジの山)	3 May 1979
The 999 arrives on the planet Ulatorus, which contains mountains of screws. When a storm causes one of the mountains to collapse, Tetsuro loses his pass and meets a machine woman who kidnaps him, seeking to keep him in her home permanently. At the same time, the 999 malfunctions due to a faulty screw. With Tetsuro's pleas the woman agrees to let him go and find his pass then agrees to build a screw which will fix the 999.
34	"The Witch of Plated City - Part 1"; Transliteration: "Plated City no Majo - Part 1" (Japanese: プレーテッド·シティの魔女前編)	18 May 1979
The 999 arrives on a planet where everything is plated in gold, the streets, the buildings, even the people. A thief knocks Tetsuro out and steals Maetel's luggage. Tetsuro runs after him into the sewers where he discovers the thief, a teenage boy named Hoilock, is not gold after all. Hoilock desires for his body to be plated in gold so the family of his girlfriend will accept him, but doing so is extremely expensive, which is why he stole the luggage. Hoilock's mother, who is part of a rebellion against those who plate everything in gold, is killed and the two of them come across her body in the sewer.
35	"The Witch of Plated City - Part 2"; Transliteration: "Plated City no Majo - Part 2" (Japanese: プレーテッド·シティの魔女後編)	25 May 1979
Hoilock's mother's dying wish is for him to continue in her footsteps in toppling those in charge of making everything gold. Meanwhile the 999 takes off without Tetsuro when he doesn't return in time, but Maetel convinces it to return. Tetsuro and Hoilock make it to the headquarters and kill the machine woman responsible for making everything gold. After she dies, everything on the planet returns to its normal color. The 999 departs and Hoilock is reunited with his girlfriend.
36	"The Great Chieftain Cyclops"; Transliteration: "Daishuuchou Saikuropusu" (Japanese: 大酋長サイクロプス)	7 June 1979
The 999 stops at an abandoned artificial colony world. Tetsuro is pleased with its appearance but Maetel is puzzled that the colony looks quite different from her last visit. They investigate further, and are set upon by a terrified mob of physically identical men. Maetel recognizes their face as being that of the colony's architect, Dr. Cyclops. She shouts for the Doctor's assistance and he quickly makes his appearance and orders his clones to withdraw. Back at his laboratory, Maetel speaks alone with her old friend and he tells her that he had taken up residence in the colony and held on despite fading health in the hope he might someday convince others to trust him and his design. Maetel replies that she trusts him, and he sighs that that was what he had been waiting to hear. He triggers the colony's self-destruct system and collapses. Maetel and Tetsuro flee to the 999, which escapes just as the colony explodes. Maetel explains that Cyclops had been ostracized by the entire galaxy when a design flaw killed all the colony's human inhabitants. She gives Tetsuro the Doctor's parting gift to him, a personal diary chronicling his long years of loneliness.
37	"Mīkun's Mansion of Life"; Transliteration: "Mīkun no Inochi no Yakata" (Japanese: ミーくんの命の館)	14 June 1979
The 999 approaches the planet Mīkun's Mansion of Life, and all the passengers appear depressed, closing the blinds as they approach it. When Tetsuro and Maetel arrive at the hotel, Tetsuro finds a tiger and snake in the hallway, so he hides in his bed the rest of the night. The next day Maetel introduces Tetsuro to Mīkun, who takes care of all the various animals on the planet, which are actually all dead animals beloved by their master. Mīkun herself was a cat who died protecting her master. As the 999 departs the planet, it disappears.
38	"The Empire of the Cowardly Elder"; Transliteration: "Hikyoumono no Chourou Teikoku" (Japanese: 卑怯者の長老帝国)	21 June 1979
The 999 is heavily damaged and forced to land on a planet under the despotic rule of the Cowardly Elder, President Delmukade. Tetsuro, Maetel and the Conductor are forced to travel underground where they meet Delmukade, who demands that Tetsuro sell him his young body. Delmukade's son Paschal arrives, and reveals that Delmukade is the only person living on this planet; suspecting rebellion everywhere, he had killed everyone else including Paschal's mother. When a warship is sent to recover Tetsuro and the others, Delmukade continues his cowardly ways, going as far as shooting Paschal to prevent him from helping Tetsuro and the others. They are able to escape however, and the planet is destroyed.
39	"Kasumi of Fog City"; Transliteration: "Kiri no Miyako no Kasumi" (Japanese: 霧の都のカスミ)	5 July 1979
The 999 arrives on a planet where everyone is very beautiful, but also extremely weak, not even going outside during the day due to the sun. A couple steals a suitcase containing Tetsuro and Maetel's passes, but they pass out from running and when they shoot Tetsuro, it is too weak to harm them. They still manage to switch Tetsuro and Maetel's passes with fake ones though, and board the 999. The takeoff is too much for their fragile bodies and they pass away.
40	"The Great Chieftain of The Spherical Housing Complex - Part 1"; Transliteration: "Kyuujou Juutakudan no Dai Shuuchou - Part 1" (Japanese: 球状住宅団の大酋長前編)	19 July 1979
The 999 approaches a large group of spherical homes, which are ruled by a Great Chieftain. Upon entering, Maetel is captured by the Chieftain's minions. Tetsuro meets Tetsuguro, a man who looks just like him and has assembled weapons to defeat the Chieftain. While they head to the Chieftain's castle, Tetsuro is tricked by a scarecrow of Maetel and is shot.
41	"The Great Chieftain of The Spherical Housing Complex - Part 2"; Transliteration: "Kyuujou Juutakudan no Dai Shuuchou - Part 2" (Japanese: 球状住宅団の大酋長後編)	26 July 1979
Tetsuro is captured and brought before the Great Chieftain, who has a computer with all of Maetel's secrets. Tetsuguro manages to rescue Tetsuro, and discovers that his girlfriend has been killed by the Chieftain. He tries to blow up the Chieftain's castle with dynamite, but Tetsuro saves Maetel first. Tetsuguro then kills the mechanical remains of the Chieftain and takes his crown, and he then, to Tetsuro and Maetel's dismay, proclaims himself the new Great Chieftain of the spherical housing complex.
42	"The Memory of Fimēl"; Transliteration: "Fimēl no Omoide" (Japanese: フィメールの思い出)	2 August 1979
The 999 approaches the planet Visage of Memories, where the Conductor many years ago promised his lover, Marvelous, that he would make money on the 999 and return. A new passenger, Fimēl boards the 999 and treats the Conductor very rudely, then causes the train to derail with a device worn around her waist. Fimēl reveals herself to be Marvelous as she leaves the train, and criticizes the Conductor for not saving money, being content to merely be Conductor of the train. The 999 departs the planet, leaving the Conductor with only the memories of the kind person she used to be.
43	"Kira of Windy Hill"; Transliteration: "Arashigaoka no Kira" (Japanese: 嵐が丘のキラ)	16 August 1979
The 999 arrives on the planet Arashigaoka (lit.: Windy Hill) where a sickly father and son, Kira operate a shoe repair store. Tetsuro's pass is stolen by the father, who seeks to get on the 999 and leave the planet so he won't be a burden to Kira. Kira forces him to return it at gunpoint, who wants to obtain a pass for him legitimately.
44	"The Ride of the Valkyries - Part 1"; Transliteration: "Valkyrie no Kuukan Kikou - Part 1" (Japanese: ワルキューレの空間騎行前編)	30 August 1979
At the 999's latest stop, Deadwood Mountain, Tetsuro and Maetel meet Prider, a poor singer who seeks to board the 999 so he can become a famous singer. When Prider doesn't have enough money to board, he borrows money from his girlfriend Alice and buys a ticket on the 999. Tetsuro gets upset at Prider for abandoning his girlfriend after all she did for him. The 999 is approached by the Valkyries, a group of witches, and three of them board the train.
45	"The Ride of the Valkyries - Part 2"; Transliteration: "Warukyuri no Kuukan Kikou - Part 2" (Japanese: ワルキューレの空間騎行後編)	6 September 1979
The three Valkyries bring everyone aboard their ship, where our heroes meet their mother, the head Valkyrie. The ship travels to the edge of the universe where the Valkyries show our heroes the bones of all the humans they have killed. Tetsuro and the others try to escape and kill the three Valkyries, who are revealed to be robots. The head Valkyrie reveals that her real daughters were killed by mechanized humans, which is why she is trying to kill everyone. She attacks, but Prider sacrifices himself and is killed. The head Valkyrie permits Tetsuro and the others to return to the 999 and leave.
46	"The Song of El Alamein"; Transliteration: "Eru Aramein no Utagoe" (Japanese: エル アラメインの歌声)	13 September 1979
Nanmi, a passenger on the 999 is able to convince the train to head to his planet, El Alamein, when he threatens to kill Tetsuro. Once they arrive Tetsuro and Maetel travel outside with him. The planet is mostly a desert, with many inactive tanks lying around. Sensing their life however, the tanks come back to life and attack. Maetel shoots Tetsuro, then herself, and with them appearing to be dead, the tanks leave them alone. The Conductor brings them all back to the 999, which takes off, but Nanmi passes away soon after.
47	"The Laboratory of Eternal War - Part 1"; Transliteration: "Eikyuu Sento Jikkenshitsu - Part 1" (Japanese: 永久戦斗実験室前編)	20 September 1979
The 999 landed on a planet called Rifle Grenade, where slaves were brought in to fight a perpetual war between two factions as spectator sport. One of the slave soldiers, Zeda, escaped and found refuge in the hotel room of Maetel and Tetsuro, but he subcumbed to his injuries and fell unconscious. Zeda was treated and brought back to the battlefield, where he would be safe from prosecution. Tetsuro went with him to the soldiers' graveyard in the middle of a desert. Though Zeda was impressed with the boy's strength and determination, he wanted to kill Tetsuro to take his pass for the 999, so that he could leave the planet for freedom.
48	"The Laboratory of Eternal War - Part 2"; Transliteration: "Eikyuu Sento Jikkenshitsu - Part 2" (Japanese: 永久戦斗実験室後編)	27 September 1979
At gunpoint (from the previous episode), Tetsuro told Zeda of his struggles back on Earth. Zeda was instead moved and decided to join the rebels. With his companions Santana and Brudas, Zeda managed to unite the two soldier factions and started to attack government facilities. However, Brudas (i.e., Brutus) was also a government spy, and the President planned for an ambush while announcing it as a special sightseeing event to the tourist. Upon learning this, Tetsuro went to the battlefield to warn Zeda, but it was too late. The entire rebel force was wiped out, and Zeda was killed in action. Brudas killed Satana when she discovered his treachery, but was in turn betrayed by the government troops. Tetsuro wanted to revenge for Zeda and the rebel soldiers, but Maetel stopped him. They had little choice but to leave the planet, basking in the hope that others like Zeda would eventually come forward and succeed.
49	"From this Star"; Transliteration: "Korekara no Hoshi" (Japanese: これからの星)	18 October 1979
Tetsuro and Maetel arrive on a planet filled with kind hearted, hard working people. When a storm ends up destroying the hotel that they are staying in, their luggage, including their passes are lost. Eventually they are returned by the owners of the hotel, who do not want to take the passes, but work hard to earn them instead.
50	"Ghost Tunnel"; Transliteration: "Bourei no Tonneru" (Japanese: 亡霊トンネル)	25 October 1979
The 999 arrives at the ghost tunnel, a giant tunnel in space formed by giant black orbs. An android woman, Eroze appears and asks Tetsuro to come off the train. When he refuses, she attacks the train with the orbs until he relents and agrees to come out. Eroze brings Tetsuro to her home, one of the orbs, and takes his pass, forcing him to chase after her through a maze of stairs until he passes out. When he awakens, she gives back the pass, but starts operating a device that will crush the 999 with the orbs. Tetsuro destroys her and saves the 999.
51	"Artemis of the Transparent Sea - Part 1"; Transliteration: "Tomeikai no Artemis - Part 1" (Japanese: 透明海のアルテミス前編)	1 November 1979
As the 999 approaches its next destination, a large number of small blue blobs start passing by the 999, warning it to not go any further. Eventually the 999 gets stuck in a larger version of these blobs, which apparently is their mother. The Galaxy Railways headquarters gets ready to blow it up so the 999 can go on, but all of a sudden a ship crashes into the blob. The Conductor manages to get them an extension to save the ship's pilot, a blue haired woman named Artemis. This episode was used as part of the TV special Can You Love Like a Mother.
52	"Artemis of the Transparent Sea - Part 2"; Transliteration: "Tomekai no Artemis - Part 2" (Japanese: 透明海のアルテミス後編)	8 November 1979
After being brought aboard the 999, Artemis reveals her history, how she departed her mother to acquire a humanoid machine body. Having to work to pay it off in a factory had its toll however, and she stole a ship and fled. Artemis dies soon after and is brought to the heart of her mother, where she is absorbed into it. With Galaxy Railways headquarters planning to destroy the mother, Tetsuro cries out for them to not do it. The mother blob however is willing to die, and thanks Tetsuro for his concern. The mother blob is destroyed and the 999 is able to escape. This episode was used as part of the TV special Can You Love Like a Mother.
53	"Tetsuro, of the Planet of Mirrors"; Transliteration: "Kagami no Hoshi no Tetsuro" (Japanese: 鏡の国の鉄郎)	15 November 1979
A boy who looks just like Tetsuro, named Manabu, and his brother work hard and are able to purchase a single pass for 999. The brother passes away before they can make it to the town where 999 arrives. When Tetsuro goes out on his own, Maetel mistakes Manabu for him. Tetsuro arrives and fights Manabu, but they quickly become friends as they have so much in common. When Manabu tries to board the 999, he is told that the pass is counterfeit. He calls on the man who sold it to him, who refuses to do anything. Tetsuro shoots the man when he tries to kill them. The 999 takes off, with Manabu forced to wait and try to work for enough money to buy a real pass.
54	"The Story of Endless Summer - Part 1"; Transliteration: "Owarinaki Natsu no Monogatari - Part 1" (Japanese: 終わりなき夏の物語前編)	22 November 1979
The 999 arrives on the Planet of the Endless Summer, which is populated by humanoid insect like creatures. The queen of the creatures captures Tetsuro and Maetel, planning to boil them to make them food for her children, but it doesn't work. The Queen and all her people build a large cocoon around the train station so the 999 can't escape, but all of them except the queen die because of it. The queen lays eggs throughout the cocoon as Tetsuro, Maetel and the Conductor return to the 999.
55	"The Story of Endless Summer - Part 2"; Transliteration: "Owarinaki Natsu no Monogatari - Part 2" (Japanese: 終わりなき夏の物語後編)	29 November 1979
The insect babies hatch and when Tetsuro finds himself unable to kill them, they climb aboard the 999 and start eating it. After the 999 leaves the planet, the queen dies. Soon after the babies all die as well, as they can't survive out in space. Only one survives, but is quite ill, so Maetel has it sent back to the Planet in a small shuttle. It is revealed that the babies didn't eat Tetsuro and the others because of his reluctance to shoot them.
56	"The Cold Blooded Empire - Part 1"; Transliteration: "Reiketsu Teikoku - Part 1" (Japanese: 冷血帝国前編)	6 December 1979
The 999 arrives on a primitive planet populated with intelligent dinosaurs and cave people who are scared of the passengers taking over the planet. Meanwhile a friendly dinosaur named Tiny befriends Tetsuro and tries to get passage on the 999. As the episode ends, the planet's natives attack Tetsuro and Maetel.
57	"The Cold Blooded Empire - Part 2"; Transliteration: "Reiketsu Teikoku - Part 2" (Japanese: 冷血帝国後編)	13 December 1979
Tiny changes his mind about going on the 999 and decides to stay on his planet with his girlfriend until they can both get tickets. The two of them help Tetsuro and Maetel when they are confronted by the planet's natives.
58	"The Footsteps of Footstep Village"; Transliteration: "Ashioto Mura no Ashioto" (Japanese: 足音村の足音)	20 December 1979
Tetsuro and Maetel arrive on the planet Footsteps Village, and are told of evil spirits that possess and kill people. Tetsuro is warned to not go out at night, but when he meets a spirit that takes the form of water, he does so and finds a comic strip buried in the ground. The comic strip belonged to the spirit when she was still alive, who tried to become a published comic strip artist but was unable to. The 999 departs the planet with Tetsuro hoping to get the comic strip published some day.
59	"Idle One's Mirror"; Transliteration: "Namakemono no Kagami" (Japanese: なまけものの鏡)	27 December 1979
The 999 stops on the planet Idle One's Mirror, where everything is automated by machines. Tetsuro disembarks the train alone, and is taken by an automated taxi around the city. Once the taxi drives him to a residential area, he finds that the all residents are obese from the lack of physical work. Some grew so big that their houses started to explode, only to have machines build new ones for them in moment's notice. Tetsuro meets a woman named Saborina, who came to the planet with her husband Gudara to clear the forests. As machines were introduced to take over their jobs, they both started to gain weight, and Gudara gradually lost his interest to work. Saborina wanted to board the 999 for the next planet, but the Conductor was unable to accommodate his request. In the heat of argument, their house exploded. At that moment, Saborina decided to stay behind to help Gudara, hoping to leave the planet with him some day.
60	"The Planet of the Pint Sized Room - Part 1"; Transliteration: "Daishijouhan Wakusei no Gensou - Part 1" (Japanese: 大四畳半惑星の幻想前編)	10 January 1980
The next stop for the 999 is the Planet of Tomorrow, a peaceful world that is very much like Earth during the late 1970s-early 1980s whose inhabitants have no knowledge of space flight. The 999 and its passengers land in secrecy and travel along railroad tracks like a normal train. A group of youths, led by Taro and Hanako, anticipate for its arrival. While the group only wants to publicize the train's existence, Taro wants to board the train. In doing so, Taro steals the train passes and spends money from Tetsuro and Maetel, as well as Tetsuro's clothes. In their plight Tetsuro and Maetel manage to find lodging in a small hostel (i.e., the pint sized room), where Tetsuro befriends the struggling comic-artist Adachi, who is looking for an inspiration for his work. The episode ends with Taro offering Maetel's pass to Hanako, who refuses it.
61	"The Planet of the Pint Sized Room - Part 2"; Transliteration: "Daishijouhan Wakusei no Gensou - Part 2" (Japanese: 大四畳半惑星の幻想後編)	17 January 1980
While stranded on the planet without train passes, Maetel seeks help from Galaxy Railways, but her efforts ends in vain. Meanwhile, with Adachi's help, Tetsuro finds a job at a noodle shop to support himself and Maetel. Tetsuro and Maetel run into the disguised Taro when they return to the train station. Taro, not wanting to leave his friends behind, gives the passes to them, not knowing at first, that they are the rightful owners. As the train departs, Taro returns to Hanako and their friends. Adachi, who also sees the train leaving the planet, finally finds inspiration for comic.
62	"The City without Night"; Transliteration: "Yoru no nai Machi" (Japanese: 夜のない街)	24 January 1980
As the 999 approaches the City Without Night, Maetel tells Tetsuro of a lake there, but tells him not to go out to see it. When they arrive on the planet, Tetsuro gets in trouble for going out at night, but is saved by Maetel. They are told that no one is allowed out at night because of a dangerous dinosaur, Heron, that lives in the lake. Tetsuro and Maetel head there anyway and help Heron when it is captured by some photographers. Heron is a friendly creature, and later helps Tetsuro and Maetel out when the police try to arrest them for the death of the photographers.
63	"The Sisters of the Pitch Dark Planet"; Transliteration: "Yami Yami no Shimai" (Japanese: ヤミヤミの姉妹)	31 January 1980
The 999 stops at the Pitch Dark Planet, where all light is instantly absorbed. A while after Maetel leaves the train to "attend to private business", Tetsuro is beckoned outside by a figure at his window, who proves to be Miru, a daughter of the planet's ruler. She and her father tell him that Maetel has been kidnapped by Miru's sister Lelan, a deranged but brilliant scientist who plans to use Maetel's brain to launch an artificial sun into orbit, and that Maetel will die unless Tetsuro can infiltrate Lelan's base and kill her. Further, the new sun will doom most of the life on their world, which has never had light in its entire natural history. Tetsuro goes back for his gun, but is taken prisoner by Lelan the instant he steps off the train. His efforts to escape prove futile and Lelan launches the sun. Miru, horribly burned, staggers into the base and tries to shut the sun off but is shot by her sister. Maetel accosts Lelan and accuses her of genocide but she retorts that sacrifices must be made for the greater good, but Maetel shows her the true result of her launching the sun and that it is causing almost everyone on the planet to die. Stricken with grief and guilt, Lelan runs out into the sunlight and is burned to death. As the train leaves, the Conductor reports that 99.99% of the planet's population has perished.
64	"The Holyland of Silence"; Transliteration: "Chinmoku no Seichi" (Japanese: 沈黙の聖地)	7 February 1980
Maetel and Tetsuro arrive at the Planet of Silence, where raising one's voice (beyond a whispering level) is punishable by death. Maetel asks Tetsuro to stay behind while she attends to some private business (concerning her "mission" with Tetsuro). Bored and worried, Tetsuro is looking for her. The townsfolk can't tolerate his voice, and is soon caught by the authorities to be executed. He is rescued by Maetel and a woman named Sylvia. Sylvia reveals that the law was enacted because everyone wore hearing aid to better listen other people's business, a vestigial legacy of a former totalitarian regime. Sylvia's father was executed when he cried for help to save her, when she was still a baby. They are discovered and surrounded. Knowing their weakness, Testuro screams at the crowd so loudly that their hearing devices fall out. The planet returns to normal as the train departs with Maetel and Tetsuro on board.
65	"The Symphonic Poem of the Witch's Harp"; Transliteration: "Kokyoshi Majo no Tategoto" (Japanese: 交響詩魔女の竪琴)	14 February 1980
The 999 arrives at a planet where the people are starving because the Queen of the planet orders all food to be brought to her. Tetsuro and Maetel travel to the island where the Queen is located and find that she died long ago, with her consciousness stored in a device behind her corpse. Tetsuro destroys the device and her corpse, freeing the planet from her oppression.
66	"The Fog of Funeral Planet"; Transliteration: "Kiri no Soso Wakusei" (Japanese: 霧の葬送惑星)	21 February 1980
As the 999 touches down on the Funeral Planet, its arrival (and whistle) disturb a funeral procession, who decide to bury Maetel and Tetsuro alive as punishment, with the proper pomp and circumstance. They are rescued by Machiru, a woman responsible for ringing the funeral bell. She explains that the inhabitants on the planet are immortal, so killing for funerals became a past time when they witnessed one over 120 years ago, when a couple crash landed on the planet. The bell stops ringing, and Machiru is killed by the procession as a result. Maetel and Tetsuro come across the procession and stun them all. Maetel explains to Testuro that funerals would be given to them when they stop moving, whether they are still alive or not.
67	"The Space Monk Dairuz"; Transliteration: "Uchu Sou Dairuz" (Japanese: 宇宙僧ダイルーズ)	28 February 1980
Dairuz, a monk with a mechanical body is on board of the 999. His bell rings throughout, and the sound waves are powerful enough to damage the train and all of Tetsuro's teeth. The Conductor takes the train to the Medical Treatment Asteroid for an overhaul as a result. Maetel and Tetsuro meet Maria, who brought her boyfriend Mikhail for gunshot treatment from their homeworld, the crime-ridden Asteroid 33. The operation is successful, but Mikhail is losing his will to live. Dairuz tries to save him with prayers, but it is Tetsuro who gives Mikhail hope to live on. Despaired, the Dairuz smashes his bell, and sacrifices part of his body so that Tetsuro's teeth could be fixed. In parting, Dairuz, who is now attached to a rock to sustain his body, tells Tetsuro that he would remeditate to change his way of salvation.
68	"The Star Named Curiosity"; Transliteration: "Kokishin to Iu Na no Hoshi" (Japanese: 好奇心という名の星)	6 March 1980
The 999 passes the Curiosity Planet, a planet with a large red dot on it that makes the planet look like an eye. The Conductor orders the passengers to not stare at the planet, but one of the passengers, a young woman named Miiru whose boyfriend was pulled out of the train to the planet does. This enrages the planet, which sends its moons after the 999 and orders the passengers to come off. There they find Miiru's boyfriend. The planet demands that the Conductor remove his clothes, which he refuses. Tetsuro and Maetel do so instead so he doesn't have to. The planet then demands Maetel be cut open so it can see her insides. This enrages Tetsuro, who using a knife from Miiru's boyfriend cuts open the planet. Exposed, the planet is embarrassed and commits suicide after the 999 flies safely away.
69	"The Defiance of C62"; Transliteration: "C62 no Hanran" (Japanese: C62の反乱)	13 March 1980
The episode opens with an armed robbery that takes place on the 555 when it stops on the Medical Treatment Asteroid (in Episode 67). Next, the 999 receives an emergency stop signal and the Conductor halts the train in mid-space. Maetel is summoned by the C62 (the locomotive for the 999), who informs her that it is going to disconnect and go on its own. News of both incidents reach the Galaxy Railways Headquarters, and one of the operatives determines that both trains are on the asteroid when the heist occurred. The Conductor later discovers that the two robbers are on board the 999, and soon after the SDF appears. One of the robbers takes Tetsuro hostage and demands that the SDF be attached to the 999. While the 999 continues with its journey, the C62 returns and is attached itself to the train. Tetsuro and Maetel use the opportunity to pacify the two perpetrators and hand them over to the authorities. At the end, Maetel reveals that the emergency stop was a test of Tetsuro's patience, and that the C62 was also part of the plot in bringing the boy to Andromeda.
70	"The City of Gentle Flowers"; Transliteration: "Kokoro Yasashiki Hana no Miyako" (Japanese: 心やさしき花の都)	20 March 1980
The 999 stopped at the City of Flowers, which was covered with flowers. When Tetsuro and Maetel went to the hotel, a fire broke out that ravaged the planet (and the flowers). The train made an emergency take off, while Maetel and Tetsuro were rescued by Coa and Rea (who started the fire), and their children Mia and Doa. The flowers, Coa explained, were poisonous, and those who destroyed them were executed. The police discovered Coa's role, and ordered his execution. The family refused to come out, and the police threatened to seal their entrance. The people rose up in defiance, however, and the police captain was forced to back down. Now on board of the 999, Maetel and Tetsuro contemplated on the significance and irrationality of Coa's (and his family's) sacrifice.
71	"The Pioneers from the River of Purgatory"; Transliteration: "Sai no Kawara no Kaikakusha" (Japanese: 賽の河原の開拓者)	27 March 1980
The River of Purgatory was a barren planet, and crops often grew with great difficulty. Almost all of the pioneers sent to the planet either died or left. Gombei and Yosaku, father and son, were the only two left on the planet. While Gombei kept on ploughing the field, believing that one day his hard work would prevail, Yosaku wanted to leave the planet. A giant bird flew to Gombei's field and picked Gombei's crops. Though Tetsuro managed to chase it away, it came back and started eating off Yosaku's field. Gombei tried to drive it off but was injured. Seeing this, Yosaku came to his father's defense. Tetsuro gave the fatal blow to the bird, and Yosaku, decided to remain on the planet, and worked the land until it became fertile.
72	"Africa the Great Dark Nebula - Part 1"; Transliteration: "Daiankoku Seiun Afurika - Part 1" (Japanese: 大暗黒星雲アフリカ前編)	24 April 1980
While traveling Great Dark Nebula, the Conductor was taken away by a two-dimensional people called the Ghost Hoppers. Meanwhile, Tetsuro was temporary blinded by the triple Sun in the system. The train then proceeded to land on the ice planet Kilimanjaro, where the same Ghost Hoppers also kidnapped Maetel and Tetsuro. They, and the 999, became experimental subjects for the Ghost Hoppers.
73	"Africa the Great Dark Nebula - Part 2"; Transliteration: "Daiankoku Seiun Afurika - Part 2" (Japanese: 大暗黒星雲アフリカ後編)	1 May 1980
While experimenting on the 999, the Ghost Hoppers put the three to a nearby jail. One of the Ghost Hoppers explained that they colonized Kilimanjaro two years ago, and eradicated the local aboriginal population. The artificial suns (which became the triple sun) they launched resulted in their two-dimensional appearance. The Ghost Hopper Queen's mothership appeared to halt the experimentation. She restored the 999 and released the three. The Queen, disgusted by the unethical pursuit of science by her own people, also left the Nebula.
74	"The Gimme Planet of 1,765,000,000 People"; Transliteration: "Jushichioku Rokusen Gohyakumannin no Kurekure" (Japanese: 17億6千5百万人のくれくれ星)	8 May 1980
The Gimme Planet was the next stop of the 999. It is a planet where begging was the only way of life. Maetel explained to Tetsuro that in the past, the planet was divided into an impoverished working class, and an extremely corrupt ruling class. Idleness eventually became the only means to combat corruption, so everyone on the planet turned to begging. Two beggars, Ikari and Nasake, could not tolerate the attitude of the people and became bandits. They sneaked into the 999, robbed the train and took Tetsuro hostage. However, Tetsuro was persuaded by their determination of not willing accepting charity, and he convinced the Conductor to disconnect their car so that they could go free to another planet. Maetel told him that, though their future is unknown, his trust and friendship gave them hope to start a new life.
75	"Shrine of the Land of Water - Part 1"; Transliteration: "Mizu no Kuni no Shaian - Part 1" (Japanese: 水の国のシャイアン 前編)	15 May 1980
The 999 was forced to land with water-borne inhabitants. Maetel and Tetsuro were escorted to meet with Waterpress, the ruler of the City. They were ambushed by a group of native Cheyenne Fish led by Geronimo, but escaped unharmed. Waterpress held Maetel and Tetsuro hostage, wanting to use the 999 to escape the planet with his people, since they have exhausted all of the planet's natural resources. Geronimo went on his own way after, an argument with his brother Navarro, leader of the Cheyenne, who preferred to live in peace with Waterpress. Waterpress was confronted by Geronimo, but he managed to trick and kill him. The 999 departed. Navarro and Suzie found Geronimo's body.
76	"Shrine of the Land of Water - Part 2"; Transliteration: "Mizu no Kuni no Shaian - Part 2" (Japanese: 水の国のシャイアン 後編)	29 May 1980
The Galaxy Railways were notified of the hijacking, and dispatched the SDF to neutralize Waterpress. Meanwhile, Navarro, Suzie and a few Cheyenne warriors began their pursuit of the 999 with one of Waterpress's prototype spaceships. The Conductor subdued the hijackers, while Navarro boarded the train, but Waterpress and his men took Suzie hostage. Tetsuro and Navarro planned an attack from outside of the train, and neutralized Waterpress. Navarro and Suzie returned to rebuild their homeworld, while Maetel and Tetsuro continued with their journey.
77	"The Holy Woman Who Devours Life - Part 1"; Transliteration: "Shokumei Seijo - Part 1" (Japanese: 喰命聖女 前編)	12 June 1980
The Rainy Pond was the next stop for the 999. A pilgrim warned the passengers of a witch who devoured life, and wanted the Conductor to leave the planet earlier. A flood came, and all the passengers were stranded on the hotel. A woman (revealed to be Arc in the second part) offered a boat ride for a price. A businessman tried to pay his way, but a young man, Columbus, took his money and pushed him into the water. He took the ride along with his girlfriend, Poem, who did so reluctantly. When the hotel was finally destroyed, the pilgrim drifted away, and Tetsuro lost sight of Maetel. Tetsuro was washed up on an island. He entered a lighthouse and was greeted by Arc and the Queen of the planet, Cueflame. Cueflame was the one who extract life flames from her victims to consumed them to attain eternal life. Her next victims were Columbus, Poem, and Maetel.
78	"The Holy Woman Who Devours Life - Part 2"; Transliteration: "Shokumei Seijo - Part 2" (Japanese: 喰命聖女 後編)	26 June 1980
Cueflame began extracting life flame from Maetel, but Tetsuro took the flame before she could consume it. In a confrontation Tetsuro discovered that Arc was a cyborg who was working for Cueflame to reclaim her human body. Meanwhile, Columbus woke up and pledge his service to Cueflame, on the condition that he and Poem could also consume the life flames. After Columbus captured Tetsuro, the Queen rewarded him with the life flame, but killed himself when he was told that the flame was extracted from Poem. The Queen asked Arc to extract Tetsuro's life, but instead she restored Maetel's life, and extracted her own. The Queen became weak after drinking Arc's flame (since she was only a cyborg), and was killed when her fortress collapsed. Maetel and Tetsuro raced back to the train as the planet was ripped apart by natural disasters.
79	"The Pirate of Time Castle - Part 1"; Transliteration: "Jikanjo no Kaizoku - Part 1" (Japanese: 時間城の海賊 前編)	3 July 1980
A mysterious caped man appears on the 999, who stops a fight between two men and later rescues Tetsuro from another man. The 999 arrives at the planet Heavy Melder where Maetel and Tetsuro split up. Tetsuro wanders to a bar where the bartender tells him of the Time Castle, which is supposedly ruled by Captain Harlock. Tetsuro also meets Leryuzu, a singer who is sister to Ryuzu (episodes 7 and 8), who tells him that Maetel has headed to the Time Castle.
80	"The Pirate of Time Castle - Part 2"; Transliteration: "Jikanjo no Kaizoku - Part 2" (Japanese: 時間城の海賊 中編)	10 July 1980
Tetsuro returns to the bar to find the location of the Time Castle and once again is rescued by the caped stranger. Tetsuro rides a motorbike to the Time Castle, but is stopped along the way by some soldiers who are led by Leryuzu. At the Time Castle Tetsuro finds Maetel confronting Captain Harlock himself. Harlock throws Tetsuro back in time, to the day that his mother was killed by Count Mecha.
81	"The Pirate of Time Castle - Part 3"; Transliteration: "Jikanjo no Kaizoku - Part 3" (Japanese: 時間城の海賊 後編)	17 July 1980
Leryuzu returns Tetsuro to the present and ties up him and Maetel. Maetel reveals that the Harlock ruling the castle is not the real Harlock, putting some doubt in Leryuzu's mind. Leryuzu confronts the fake Harlock, then destroys the Time Castle, the fake Harlock and herself. Tetsuro realizes that the caped mystery man was the real Captain Harlock, and he sees the Arcadia take off from the planet.
82	"Tale of a Short Life"; Transliteration: "Mijika na Seimei no Monogatari" (Japanese: 短かな生命の物語)	24 July 1980
The next station for the 999 was called Butterfly's Dream. The inhabitants had wings (like butterflies) but they also have a very short lifespan (also like butterflies). They met Leaf and Kureha. Leaf, an artist, was wingless and was shunned by the locals because of it. Kureha was in love with Leaf, but she was also engaged to Hanza. Kureha called off the engagement and went to the forest with Leaf, but Hanza took her back with the help of thugs. When the 999 was about to leave, the autumn wind signaled the end of Kureha and Hanza, but Kureha found Leaf before she died in his arms.
83	"The Third Life"; Transliteration: "Daisan Seimeitai" (Japanese: 第3生命帯)	31 July 1980
The 999 reached a system when a battle took place between two planets, Maya and Zaba. Meanwhile one of the planets in the system was about to explode and destroyed the two worlds. Two Zabans, Seth and Rei took a spaceship to colonize another planet (planet No. 3) in the system. The 999 was also forced to land on the planet. Tetsuro and Maetel were ambushed by an ape man, who stole their passes. The ape man turned out to be Mayan Rossa, who arrived 3 months ago with his companion Luna, but the planet's energy devolved their bodies. They wanted to trade the passes with the Zaban spaceship, but Rei took them hostage while Seth returned the passed to Tetsuro and Maetel. When the Mayans managed to hijack the spaceship, they realized it could not take off. Seth offered a chance to cooperate, but Rossa and Luna declined and ran away. Seth activated the genetic reinforcement device, which supposedly nullified the effects of the planet, while Rei watched over him.
84	"Planet of the Giant Elephant"; Transliteration: "Kyozo no Hoshi" (Japanese: 巨象の星)	14 August 1980
Tetsuro intercepted a message in a bottle on the train. It was sent by explorer J.F. Stanley, who was left stranded on the Planet of Giant Elephant with his wife, Merusa, and his assistant, Narl. They were searching for a giant elephant called Flame. The Conductor reluctantly stopped at the planet to look for them. They located Stanley's party, but Stanley instead wanted to stay. Narl knocked him unconscious and took off with Merusa when Tetsuro and Maetel were trying to bring him on the boat. Flame appeared and killed Narl. Stanley's wife suffered minor injuries. Stanley wanted to break camp and pursue the Queen, who controlled Flame, while the rest grudgingly followed. When the Queen finally appeared, and instructed Flame to kill them all. Stanley was mortally wounded, but Tetsuro and Maetel managed to confront the Queen and killed her. Merusa decided to remain on the planet to watch over her husband's dreams.
85	"The Planet of Phantom Love"; Transliteration: "Ai no Genei Wakusei" (Japanese: 愛の幻影惑星)	21 August 1980
As the 999 approached the Planet of Illusive Love, and everyone started to show yearnings for unrequited love. Tetsuro lost sight of Maetel but instead met Naya, a street poet who was obsessed Lestel, an artist who instead loved her model, Pheras, who was in love Bina). Naya broke out in tears when Lestel rejected her advances. Tetsuro offered to find Lestel, who left with Naya. Maetel appeared took him to their hotel room. Lestel was enraged when Pheras took off with Bina. However, Pheras and Bina were killed in a car crash, and it turned out they were cyborgs. Realizing that he was only chasing a dream, Lestel ran off to join the Legionnaire, while Naya decided to wait for him until he returned. Note: The Conductor has a memories of his lost-love Marvelous who appeared in episode 42, but in this episode she is called Fiona instead.
86	"UFO from the Planet of Forgotten Parents"; Transliteration: "Oyashirazu no UFO" (Japanese: 親知らず星のUFO)	28 August 1980
The 999 was interrupted by an UFO near the Planet of Forgotten Parents. The rustic planet got its name when the youth left their parents behind to find new lives. The innkeeper mistook Tetsuro for his son, Tetsuo, but his wife explained that he went mad while waiting for him. The real Tetsuo to a factory as a slave. He killed the slavemaster and escaped in an UFO. A secret agent located Tetsuo and took him back to the slave planet, but Tetsuro offered her to take him instead, so that Tetsuo's father would not have to suffer. The agent was moved by Tetsuro and released both of them.
87	"Elsa from the Sea"; Transliteration: "Umi kara kita Elsa" (Japanese: 海からきたエルザ)	4 September 1980
The 999 was searched by Brittenian soldiers when it landed on the God Given planet. Maetel and Tetsuro met Nasuka, one of the soldiers who was sleeping on the job. Tetsuro later found Nasuka, who was taking a boat to Honiara Island, where the planet elder resided. The two entered a cave and found the elder, who informed them that the planet was about to enter an ice age, but this would also waken the sea-dwelling Suraoids. On their journey home, Tetsuro and Nasuka found his lover Elza, a Suraoid injured in an underwater attack. They were discovered by fellow Brittenian soldiers, and the captain arrested Tetsuro and ordered the execution of Nasuka and Elza. Maetel appeared and drove the troops away. Nasuka and Elza left to find a place to live their lives in peace.
88	"Planet of Crossroads of Destiny"; Transliteration: "Unmei no Wakarie Hoshi" (Japanese: 運命の分かれ星)	11 September 1980
The 999 approached the Planet called Crossroads of Destiny, where its blue satellite planet was about to become extinct. The planet was inhabited by a people who returned to a survivalist society when it ran out of natural resources. Tetsuro met Yaku, a weak hunter who was experimenting with new weapons. When his companion Aya decided to leave him for Mu, Yaku went to confront Mu, but was badly beaten. However, he managed to kill a saber-toothed tiger with a crossbow he constructed, saving Aya and Mu. Though Mu laughed for his lack of physical strength, Yaku was satisfied that a new age of knowledge had started with him.
89	"Gunman's Elegy"; Transliteration: "Ganman aika" (Japanese: ガンマン哀歌)	25 September 1980
The 999 arrived at the Hangman's Planet, where all the outlaws in Andromeda gather. Tetsuro met Mimoza, who wanted to help her father build a music hall, but her father was killed during a hold-up. The Sheriff appeared and told Maetel and Tetsuro of a feud between the White and Black gangs, over the control of a gold mine. A gunman named Wester joined the White gang, despite urging of Tetsuro otherwise. Maetel was mugged at the hotel, and Tetsuro joined the Black gang to exact revenge. A gunfight between the two gangs anhiliated each other, but Wester insisted a duel with Tetsuro. Wester was mortally wounded, but in his dying wish he wanted Tetsuro to give his gang earnings to Mimoza. The Sheriff showed up, wanted to arrest and execute Tetsuro for robbery, but Maetel appeared, and revealed that the mugging was orchestrated by the Sheriff and the Mayor, who also wanted control over the mines. The Sheriff found his men captured, and the mayor was about to be executed by the townsfolk.
90	"Yuki-onna of Andromeda - Part 1"; Transliteration: "Andromeda no Yukionna - Part 1" (Japanese: アンドロメダの雪女 前編)	9 October 1980
Maetel and Tetsuro arrived at Snowica, and Tetsuro was warned of the Snow Woman, who had the power to kill when the victim made eye contact. They met Tsuru, the most reputable ramen cook in Andromeda, but business was slow for him when people adopted mechanical bodies. While Maetel was away (discussing her mission on Tetsuro with C62), Tetsuro went to Tsuru's shop, and Tsuru told him a story of Yuki, a woman she used to love, but the Snow Woman appeared, who also wanted a bowl of ramen. To Tetsuro's surprise, he did not die when he made eye contact with her, but the Snow Woman was disappointed when her ramen turned to ice when she touched it. Tetsuro sympathized with her and they left together. Tetsuro told her of his desire of a mechanical body, she promised to bring him to a place where he could receive one for free. The episode ended with Maetel looking for Tetsuro in the snow.
91	"Yuki-onna of Andromeda - Part 2"; Transliteration: "Andromeda no Yukionna - Part 2" (Japanese: アンドロメダの雪女 後編)	16 October 1980
Maetel ran into Snowlock, a broker for mechanical bodies who was collaborating with the Snow Woman. Snowlock brought her to his workshop, but Maetel managed to destroy it. Meanwhile, the Snow Woman wanted to take Tetsuro's body so that she could eat hot ramen without freezing it. Tetsuro promised to make her ramen, but it also turned to ice when she touched it. The Snow Woman told Maetel that she was Yuki, and was in love with Tsuru. Maetel then brought Tsuru to her home and his ramen finally made her heart warm again. She died in Tsuru's arms as her ice body melted away.
92	"The End of the Undersea City"; Transliteration: "Kaitei Toshi no Saigo" (Japanese: 海底都市の最後)	23 October 1980
The 999 reached the planet of Rainbow Sash. All that remained was a single underwater city resulting from a nuclear war. Maetel and Tetsuro went to the hotel, and saw the janitor Tadashi was unjustly dismissed by the manager. Tetsuro left the hotel in disgust and stayed at Tadashi's home. Kumi, the hotel receptionist, appeared, and they witnessed a car crash. It turned out the driver was, Miyoko Ohara, secretary to the governor. She warned them of an imminent earthquake that would destroy the city, and gave them the pass to the escape pods before succumbing from her injury. The 999 also departed, but Maetel convinced the Conductor to stay on the surface in case Tetsuro escaped. Once in the escape pod, the hotel manager emerged from the luggage prepared by Kumi, and tried to kill Tadashi, but was killed by Tetsuro, who also managed to sneak into the same escape pod. Kumi confessed that she was with the manager because of his power and money, but she loved Tadashi. They reached the surface and Tetsuro was rescued by the 999.
93	"Keiko of the Insect Planet"; Transliteration: "Konchu Wakusei no Keiko" (Japanese: 昆虫惑星の螢子)	30 October 1980
The next stop of the 999 was the Insect Planet. It used to be paradise for insects before the humans colonization, and the Conductor warned Tetsuro and Maetel of the recent murders that have been taking place. Maetel and Tetsuro came a cross a man murdered, and his caged insects were released. They went to the house of Futoshi, Keiko, and their family, where Tetsuro saw the murderer ran into, but they did not find the perpetrator. In the following morning, Keiko met Tetsuro, and pleaded him to become an insect with her. A group of insect people appeared and tried to kidnap Tetsuro, but Maetel appeared and saved him. They returned to Keiko's home to find that she was transformed into an insect. She was, indeed, the one behind the recent killings. Keiko asked everybody to leave the house, blew up her room and killed herself.
94	"Yaryabol's Miniature World - Part 1"; Transliteration: "Yaryabol no Chiisa na Sekai - Part 1" (Japanese: ヤーヤボールの小さな世界 前編)	6 November 1980
Yaryabol, instructed by his mother, altered the course of the 999 to his home world, where everything was of miniature proportions. As they entered the hotel, they received a dinner invitation from Yaraybol. Maetel was trapped in the elevator and Tetsuro was ambushed route and was captured by Yaryabol. Maetel escaped and found Tetsuro resting in Yaryabol's residence, where, true to his word, Yaryabol they proceeded to dinner. When Maetel told Yaryabol that his mother died in an accident some time ago, Yaryabol became enraged and insisted that she was still alive. In the meantime, the 999 was ordered to leave Yaryabol's world immediately, leaving Maetel and Tetsuro stranded.
95	"Yaryabol's Miniature World - Part 2"; Transliteration: "Yaryabol no Chiisa na Sekai - Part 2" (Japanese: ヤーヤボールの小さな世界 後編)	13 November 1980
Maetel and Tetsuro remained in Yaryabol's mansion to find out what actually happened to his mother, but instead Tetsuro was lured to a trap designed to kill him but managed to (barely) escape. Maetel confronted Yaryabol but was herself restrained by Yaryabol's mother, who ordered him kill Maetel. Though initially reluctant, Yaryabol succumbed to his mother, only to be stopped by Tetsuro. Tetsuro discovered that Yaryabol's mother was a crude robot, and her consciousness was transferred to a supercomputer by Yaryabol. Tetsuro destroyed the computer in a final confrontation, and Yaryabol was devastated believing he was unable to achieve anything without his mother on his side. Meanwhile, the Conductor managed to convince C62 to reverse its course to retrieve Maetel and Tetsuro.
96	"Flying Kuro - Part 1"; Transliteration: "Flying Kuro - Part 1" (Japanese: フライング·クロ 前編)	20 November 1980
Tetsuro and Maetel travel to a planet where a robot cat fights against the government oppressors. They are arrested when they are believed to have a connection to the robot cat. Also they meet some cute black cats that can fly for no reason. Ultimately Maetel causes a man to kill himself by showing him what is inside her bag, and then the robot cat steals Tetsuro's pass.
97	"Flying Kuro - Part 2"; Transliteration: "Flying Kuro - Part 2" (Japanese: フライング·クロ 後編)	27 November 1980
Tetsuro meets the robot owner of the robot cat, Neko. Meanwhile all the robot cats on the planet stage a rebellion. Armys of robot cats fill the skies. The army tries to fight them off but is ineffective against their small size and sheer numbers. Flying Kuro, who is just a flying cat and not a robot cat is caught in the crossfire, but is rescued by the robot cat from before. The army then takes Flying Kuro hostage. Tetsuro and Neko have a disagreement over the value of life, and the cats stop rebelling, but then all the cat robots are gassed to death. Neko is arrested but then she blows up a truck and is shot to death. Flying Kuro then walks away into space and leaves the planet behind, Tetsuro and Maetel get back on the 999 and do the same.
98	"The One Book Left in Space"; Transliteration: "Uchu ni Nokotta Issatsu no Hon" (Japanese: 宇宙に残った一冊の本)	4 December 1980
Tetsuro meets a couple who spend their final days writing a book about their planet blowing up. Then it does, but they finish the book and launch it into space, while they burn to death inside a tree house.
99	"Fourth Dimension Elevator"; Transliteration: "Yojigen no Elevator" (Japanese: 四次元エレベーター)	11 December 1980
Tetsuro gets lost taking an elevator that takes him to the fourth dimension. Maetel rescues him and he shoots a flashy dude who turned out to be a cyborg, then they get out and happily continue on.
100	"The Monster of Loose Zone"; Transliteration: "Loose Zone no Yokai" (Japanese: ルーズゾーンの妖怪)	18 December 1980
The train passes through a loose zone where everyone becomes loose and lazy and otherwise irresponsible. Tetsuro gets thrown out of the train somehow and the Conductor and the train are too lazy to look for him. Maetel is virtually unaffected. Tetsuro then ends up in a giant trash heap where he is chased by a monster made of trash. Eventually Maetel rescues Tetsuro on an uninhabited garbage planet. When the 999 leaves a much larger garbage monster attacks it but then collapses.
101	"Planet of Eternally Pursued Dreams"; Transliteration: "Eien no Yume Oi Hoshi" (Japanese: 永遠の夢追い星)	25 December 1980
Tetsuro meets a man who would like to be a manga artist but can't do so because the planet has a caste system. Maetel's suitcase is stolen and the passes are taken. They have the manga artist thrown in jail with an execution pending if he is found guilty. He is found innocent but they will kill him anyway. Then it turns out his sister actually stole the passes. He has a spazz attack, runs into open traffic and gets hit by a car. As he sits in bed dying he dreams he could only find the books he read as a child then he dies. His sister regretfully returns Tetsuro and Maetel's passes having killed her brother by stealing them, but they forgive her because he at least died a peaceful if not delusional death.
102	"Planet of the Holy Queen's Revolt"; Transliteration: "Seijoo no Hanran Hoshi" (Japanese: 聖女王の反乱星)	8 January 1981
Tetsuro travels to a planet where humans evolved from bees and hornets, and the two of them are poised to have a war. Tetsuro tries to make peace between them but just ends up thrown in jail. Then an all out War starts. Everyone dies but a film is left behind. Tetsuro and Maetel continue on.
103	"A Thousand and One Nights in Andromeda - Part 1"; Transliteration: "Andromeda Senya Ichiya - Part 1" (Japanese: アンドロメダ千夜一夜 前編)	15 January 1981
The 999 crash lands on planet Ali-baba run by a woman named Ali Baba. Tetsuro and Maetel are stripped and taken hostage by her. Maetel tells her a fabricated story she read from a book and they manage to get their things back, but then Ali Baba decides to renege on the deal and tries to recapture Maetel. Tetsuro is attacked by a gigantic roc bird.
104	"A Thousand and One Nights in Andromeda - Part 2"; Transliteration: "Andromeda Senya Ichiya - Part 2" (Japanese: アンドロメダ千夜一夜 後編)	22 January 1981
Tetsuro defeats the giant roc and meets up with the Conductor. Maetel is shot in the face by a mysterious woman, and Ali Baba's goons fail to capture her. After a lengthy chase that results in the woman being knocked unconscious and Maetel being captured, Tetsuro and the Conductor wake her up and the woman reveals herself to be the real Ali Baba. The two Ali Babas have a showdown and Tetsuro helps. Fake Ali Baba tries to steal Maetel's body, but Tetsuro shoots her. The real Ali Baba then turns on Tetsuro and Maetel, and reveals that no one on this planet knows how to get anything without stealing. Ultimately, Ali Baba and her gang are eaten to death by a flock of giant roc birds, except Tetsuro and Maetel who happily continue on.
105	"Legendary Young Soldier"; Transliteration: "Wakaki Senshi no Densetsu" (Japanese: 若き戦士の伝説)	29 January 1981
The 999 goes to some weird planet full of demotivated cyborgs and Tetsuro and Maetel are taken hostage by a bunch of kids. The kids try to convince Tetsuro not to get a robot body and to help them fight against the cyborgs. Tetsuro spends most of the episode trying to figure out what is right. All of the human kids are killed by cyborgs, and they throw Tetsuro off a building. He survives long enough to be rescued by Maetel, but she instead allows him to fall to his death. Ultimately the whole thing turns out to be just a dream.
106	"Ghost Station 13"; Transliteration: "Gōsuto Sutehshon 13-go" (Japanese: 幽霊駅13号)	5 February 1981
Aron and Crosalis were lonely space drifters, transparent and without physical form. Aron turned himself into a train station (Ghost Station 13), so that he could have galaxy train passengers to land and play with his sister Crosalis. The 999 landed on station 13, but was trapped. Aron asked Maetel to provide her psychomagnetic waves (i.e., life energy), so that Crosalis could play with Tetsuro in physical form. Meanwhile, Galaxy Railways decided to destroy the ghost station, and advised the 999 to disembark immediately. The 999 could not escape in time, but Aron and Crosalis intercepted the destruction waves, out of gratitude for Maetel and Tetsuro.
107	"The Birdmen of Kilimanjaro"; Transliteration: "Kilimanjaro no Choujin" (Japanese: キリマンジャロの鳥人)	12 February 1981
Kilimanjaro (a different planet than in Eps. 71 and 72) was a world where chivalry still existed among soldiers. While in the 999, Maetel and Tetsuro witnessed a dogfight between two opposing squadrons. They later came across one of the captains (Alman), who bullied one of the squadmates, Izaka, for his poor upbringing and battle performance. Another dogfight soon followed, and an enemy pilot killed Izaka's civilian blood brother Kikuo for sport. Izaka singlehandedly took out the enemy squadron (included Captain Otto). He was arrested for unchivalrous behavior due to a recent ceasefire, but was rescued by Tetsuro. Izaka was pursued by Alman in another dogfight, but managed to escape, using the 999 as cover.
108	"The Collapse of Macaroni au Gratin"; Transliteration: "Macaroni Gratin no Hokai" (Japanese: マカロニグラタンの崩壊)	19 February 1981
The Planet of Macaroni au Gratin, so called after its shape, was the next destination of the 999. Mane and Sab, the mechanical Dendorium brothers, who were bored with playing war games at the expense of the planet, captured (and shrunk) Maetel and Tetsuro so that they could escape the planet with the 999. They feigned a total war that destroyed the planet, but Queen Promethium (Maetel's mother) appeared and brought them to the train. Mother Computer Junior, discovered their escape and had them executed, while restoring Tetsuro and Maetel to their original size.
109	"Maetel's Trip - Part 1"; Transliteration: "Maetel no Tabi - Part 1" (Japanese: メーテルの旅 前編)	26 February 1981
To make up for the delay in the previous episode, the 999 enters Warp Space. Unexpectedly, a duplicate 999 materializes alongside them and the two trains collide and become entangled. Crippled, the 999 and its double are drawn into the gravity of a sinister-looking planet that seems to be adrift in Warp Space. Tetsuro climbs though a breach into the other 999 and encounters an exact double of Maetel, but her companion is not his own double, but a different boy named Redril Hammer. Redril explains that he is traveling on the 999 to a planet where he will receive a mechanical body for free. The trains narrowly avert crashing down but the car carrying both Maetels breaks loose and falls to the surface.
110	"Maetel's Trip - Part 2"; Transliteration: "Maetel no Tabi - Part 2" (Japanese: メーテルの旅 後編)	5 March 1981
The trains having landed on the Wandering Planet's surface to rescue the two Maetels, Redril and Testuro confront two extremely alien-looking creatures who refer to themselves as "humans". When the aliens confirm to their satisfaction that Tetsuro, Redril, the two Maetels and the two Conductors are flesh-and-blood and not mechanized, they are permitted to return to the trains. As they prepare to lift off, the Conductors are seized by a pair of mechanical creatures with a shape resembling that of the two "humans" they encountered before. They demand that the two boys surrender their passes and allow them to take their place on the train. The Conductors are aghast and ask to stay behind instead of the boys, who in turn object that they themselves should remain as the Conductors are too important to the other passengers. Startled that flesh-and-blood creatures could be anything other than cruel and selfish, the aliens relent and explain that the "real" "humans" who rule their planet are tyrants who ruthlessly hunt down and murder their mechanized "human" subjects. The boys remark that this is the reverse of their own experience, much to the astonishment of the two mechanized "humans", who conclude that they could never harm "real" humans as compassionate as them. The trains leave the planet, and exit Warp Space to return to their respective time periods.
111	"The Bat Planet"; Transliteration: "Wakusei Komori" (Japanese: 惑星こうもり)	12 March 1981
On the Bat planet, the 999's last stop before the final destination, Tetsuro met a sickly young man, who wanted a mechanical body so that he could have the endurance to become a great animator. Like many travelers up to this point, Tetsuro recalled his encounters along the journey and expressed doubts in his decision to obtain a mechanical body. The young man broke into their hotel room stole Tetsuro's belongings, including his pass, so that he could board the 999 disguised as Tetsuro. However, he found this unethical, since he has already worked so hard travel up to this point, and returned everything to Tetsuro when he met them at the train station.
112	"Illusion of Youth: Farewell 999 - Part 1"; Transliteration: "Seishun no Genei Saraba 999 - Part 1" (Japanese: 青春の幻影 さらば999 前編)	19 March 1981
The 999 reached its final destination, the planet Promethium. Once on the surface, Tetsuro and Maetel were escorted by Mirai, who brought them to the sanitarium where Tetsuro had up to 24 hours to contemplate his decision on adopting a mechanical body. Maetel warned Tetsuro to think wisely before leaving him with Mirai to meet her father, whose consciousness was encased in a pendant. In the sanitarium, Tetsuro realized that the life of a cyborg was empty and disappointing, and decided not to take his machine body. He also witnessed a cyborg committing suicide and, in his last moments, warned Tetsuro of Maetel's intentions, and that she was the daughter of the Queen of Promethium. In a confrontation between Tetsuro and Maetel, Mirai explained that Maetel was to bring courageous young boys like him to help construct an eternal mechanized empire. The Queen's agents appeared and Tetsuro was arrested for defying the Queen's plans. She ordered Tetsuro and the 999 to be thrown into a nearby black hole. Meanwhile, Maetel's father instructed her to throw him (the pendant) into the planet's central reactor to destroy the planet and Queen Promethium. The plan was thwarted by the Queen, and Maetel was imprisoned. The episode ended with Maetel watching the 999 taking off, which was headed to the event horizon.
113	"Illusion of Youth: Farewell 999 - Part 2"; Transliteration: "Seishun no Genei Saraba 999 - Part 2" (Japanese: 青春の幻影 さらば999 後編)	26 March 1981
The Conductor and Tetsuro attempted to steer the 999 away from the black hole, but was immobilized by tractor beams from Promethium. In the meantime, Maetel was able to escape, and managed to turn off the tractor beams. The 999 was able to change course and returned to the planet to save Maetel. He ran into Mirai, and stopped her trying to kill herself for failing to persuade Tetsuro to become a cyborg. Maetel appeared, and the three agreed to work together to retrieve the pendant from the Queen. Though this time the plan successful and the reactor began to overload, Mirai was killed in the process. Queen Promethium disintegrates in the final confrontation with Maetel and Tetsuro. They successfully boarded the 999 and returned to the Bat planet (ep. 111) as they witnessed the planet's destruction. Tetsuro decided to return to Earth with the 999 to continue his struggle against the cyborgs. Maetel boarded another train (the 777), and explained to Tetsuro in a note, that she must begin her journey once again with another boy like him.
