= Back to the Forest =

Japanese anime television special

のどか森の動物大作戦 (Nodoka Mori no Dobutsu Daisakusen)
- Anime television film
- Directed by: Yoshio Kuroda
- Produced by: Koichi Motohashi
- Written by: Toshiyuki Kashikura
- Music by: Tatsumi Yano
- Studio: Nippon Animation
- Original network: Fuji TV
- English network: Nickelodeon
- Released: 3 February 1980
- Runtime: 75 minutes

Back to the Forest (のどか森の動物大作戦, Nodoka Mori no Doubutsu Daisakusen; lit. The Great Plot of the Animals of Placid Forest) is a Japanese anime television special, broadcast as part of Fuji TV's Nissei Family Special block on 3 February 1980. An English language dub was produced in 1989 by Ahmed Agrama's Intersound, Inc., and released on home video in the United States by Celebrity Home Entertainment. It was never shown in the cinema in either country, although the American cable channel Nickelodeon showed it occasionally as part of its weekend "Special Delivery" block. The special was developed by Nippon Animation with production assistance by Madhouse.

The special is based on the 1968 children's novel Jakobus Nimmersatt, by German author Boy Lornsen.

== Plot ==
Many animals inhabit a peaceful forest known as Placid Forest. They attempt to resist, and ultimately must declare war on, some humans who live in a nearby village. The humans plot to cut down all the trees in Placid Forest so they can make money and become millionaires, but the animals know that they will lose their home if they do not act fast. The animals team up and carry out a systematic process of operations to guard their habitat.

== Characters ==
Non-humans

- Jacob (Kaneta Kimotsuki / Robert Axelrod) is a black crow who wears a yellow bandana, is the leader of the animals and the first to sound the alarm to the other animals. He has excellent leadership, courage, and elocution. His biggest flaw, however, is his occasional appetite for food, especially cheese, which puts him in a rat trap set by Marcus.
- Peter (Masako Nozawa / Rebecca Forstadt) is an elf-like fairy with a pink hat and green clothes and is a great ally to Jacob. He is appointed the chairman of the animals, second-in-command to Jacob. He sometimes plays hide-and-seek with his friend Penny, and he is skilled at looking at the big picture before making a decision. He can turn invisible at will, but when someone sneezes, he becomes visible, which almost gives him away to Marcus when he attempts to steal the humans' lunch.
- Penny (Minori Matsushima / Lara Cody) is a mouse with a red nose and is highly fearful. When she proceeds to gnaw the bridge leading from Placid Forest to the village with Billy and his team of rats, she almost falls in the river and runs away, thus earning her the label of coward from Billy, but she finally plucks up her courage when she drops a pot on Marcus's cat. This prompts Billy to call her "the first mouse to ever get a cat in the history of the rat's kingdom".
- Billy is the leader of the rats. He is initially very strict about fear, calling Penny a coward for failing to gnaw the bridge, but when Penny proves her courage by inadvertently dropping a pot on Marcus's cat, he becomes extremely appreciative of her. He is voiced by Eddie Frierson in the English version.
- Paul is the leader of the squirrels and is very competitive against the rats. He offers to listen to every idea suggested, and he is a reliable ally to the animals. He is voiced by Mathew Stone in the English version.
- Mary, an owl wearing a locket, is obsessed with her appearance and beauty. At times she is arrogant, especially to Jacob, whom she sometimes teases, but in the long run, she is sweet and sympathetic. She is voiced by Eiko Masuyama in the Japanese version and by Lisa Paulette in the English version.
- Carl, a green rabbit, he participates in the forest plot alongside his grandfather, and is obedient and loyal both to him and to Peter. He is voiced by Mami Koyama in the Japanese version and by Wendee Lee in the English version. His grandfather is voiced by Richard Barnes.
- Jay, as his name suggests, is a blue jay. He is easily excited and upset, which is his biggest flaw, and sometimes, he cannot tell how the other animals feel. He is voiced by Stephen Apostolina in the English version.
- Stanley is an hedgehog. When he hears an idea or has a particular goal, he will hold onto it until it is done. His obsessive nature, however, can lead him to occasional temper tantrums. He is voiced by Don Warner in the English version.
- Adam is a frog and is relatively calm, unlike Jay. When he hops, his speech is sometimes fragmented. He is voiced by Dave Mallow in the English version.

Humans

- Marcus is the leader of the villainous humans. His leadership and courage match those of Jacob, but unlike him, Marcus is arrogant and usually doesn't think about the consequences first. He is voiced by Cyn Branch. His wife, Bertha, is voiced by Lisa Paulette.
- Timothy is a businessman and like Marcus he is intent on receiving money, and he will often ignore the consequences of his actions. He is voiced by Steve Kramer. His wife is voiced by Lara Cody.
- Nigel is a cook and has a gruff voice, which reflects his courage and toughness. He is voiced by Clifton Wells.
- Michael is a tailor and is not as enthusiastic about cutting down the forest as the other men, but he likes having a large sum of money. He is voiced by Mikey Godzilla. His wife, Joanna, is voiced by Penny Sweet.
- Benjamin is a priest, who is somewhat of a neutral party compared to the other men, as he is only concerned about his church at first. He is voiced by Leonard Pike.
- Matthew is a shepherd who betrays his teammates, since he opposes cutting down the forest. This makes him a reliable ally to the animals, albeit a human. He is voiced by Alfred Russell.

== Staff ==
- Original author: Boy Lornsen
- Writer: Toshiyuki Kashikura
- Producer: Tadashi Oba
- Director: Yoshio Kuroda
- Music: Tatsumi Yano
- Character design: Yasuji Mori
- Layout supervisor: Shunichi Sakai
- Animation director: Akio Sakai
- Assistant animation director: Kazuko Hirose
- Art director: Toshiharu Mizutani
- Art setting: Minoru Nishida
- Sound director: Shigeharu Shiba
- Color checking: Akiko Koyama
- Key animators: Kazuko Hirose, Sumiko Asado, Takeshi Shoji, Megumi Mizuta, Manabu Ohashi, Madhouse, Yoon Sung studio (South Korea)
- Animation checking: Takumi Koyama, Masahiro Kase
- Finish animation: Studio Killy, Studio M
- Backgrounds: Kobayashi Production
