= Zukkoke Knight - Don De La Mancha =

Japanese anime television series

ずっこけナイト ドンデラマンチャ (Zukkoke Knight Don De La Mancha)
- Anime television series
- Directed by: Kunihiko Yuyama
- Studio: Ashi Productions; Kokusai Eiga-sha
- Original network: Tokyo Channel 12
- Original run: April 15, 1980 – September 23, 1980
- Episodes: 23

Zukkoke Knight — Don De La Mancha (ずっこけナイト ドンデラマンチャ, Zukkoke Naito Don de ra Mancha; lit. 'Foolish Knight — Don of La Mancha') is a Japanese anime television series based on Miguel de Cervantes' Don Quixote. The 23-episode series was directed by Kunihiko Yuyama and was first broadcast on Tokyo Channel 12 in 1980.

The series was also dubbed in Italian under the name Don Chisciotte.
