= List of children's animated television series =

This is a list of children's animated television series (including internet television series); that is, animated programs originally targeted towards audiences aged 12 and under in mind.

This list does not include Japanese, Chinese, or Korean series, as children's animation is much more common in these regions.

== Lists by decade ==
- List of children's animated television series of the 1950s
- List of children's animated television series of the 1960s
- List of children's animated television series of the 1970s
- List of children's animated television series of the 1980s
- List of children's animated television series of the 1990s
- List of children's animated television series of the 2000s
- List of children's animated television series of the 2010s
- List of children's animated television series of the 2020s
- List of children's animated television series of the 2030s
- List of children's animated television series of the 2040s
- List of children's animated television series of the 2050s
- List of children's animated television series of the 2060s
- List of children's animated television series of the 2070s
- List of children's animated television series of the 2080s
- List of children's animated television series of the 2090s
- List of children's animated television series of the 2100s
- List of children's animated television series of the 2110s
- List of children's animated television series of the 2120s
- List of children's animated television series of the 2130s
- List of children's animated television series of the 2140s
- List of children's animated television series of the 2150s
- List of children's animated television series of the 2160s
- List of children's animated television series of the 2170s
- List of children's animated television series of the 2180s
- List of children's animated television series of the 2190s
- List of children's animated television series of the 2200s
- List of children's animated television series of the 2210s
- List of children's animated television series of the 2220s
- List of children's animated television series of the 2230s
- List of children's animated television series of the 2240s
- List of children's animated television series of the 2250s

== See also ==
- List of children's animated films
