= List of children's animated television series of the 1950s =

This is a list of children's animated television series (including internet television series); that is, animated programs originally targeted towards audiences aged 12 and under in mind.

This list does not include Japanese, Chinese, or Korean series, as children's animation is much more common in these regions.

== 1950s ==
=== United States ===
Title	Genre	Seasons/episodes	Show creator(s)	Original release	Network	Studio	Age rating	Technique
Crusader Rabbit		455 episodes	• Alexander Anderson • Jay Ward	August 1, 1950 – December 1, 1959	• Syndication (1950–1979) • WNBC (1950–1967) • KNBH (1949) • (NBC's owned-and-operated station in New York and Los Angeles) (1950–1967)	• Metromedia Producers Corporation • 20th Television		Traditional
The Adventures of Paddy the Pelican		6 shorts	Sam Singer	September 11 – October 13, 1950	WLS-TV (ABC)	Tempe-Toons (referred to as "Medallion Productions" during the end titles)		Traditional
Barker Bill's Cartoon Show	Animation			1953–1955	CBS	Terrytoons		Traditional
Mighty Mouse Playhouse		80 shorts		December 10, 1955 – September 2, 1967	CBS	CBS Television Studios	TV-Y7	Traditional
The Gumby Show		2 seasons, 130 episodes		May 1, 1956 – July 9, 1968	Syndication	Clokey Productions	TV-G	Stop-motion
The Ruff and Reddy Show	Comedy	3 seasons, 12 episodes	• Joseph Barbera • Charles Shows	December 14, 1957 – April 2, 1960	NBC	H-B Enterprises	TV-G	Traditional
Colonel Bleep	Science fiction	100 episodes	Robert D. Buchanan	1957–1960	Syndication	Soundac		Traditional
The Adventures of Spunky and Tadpole	Comedy	150 episodes		September 6, 1958 – September 9, 1961	Syndication	Beverly Hills Productions		Traditional
The Huckleberry Hound Show	Comedy	4 seasons, 68 episodes	• William Hanna • Joseph Barbera	September 29, 1958 – December 1, 1961	Syndication	Hanna-Barbera	TV-G	Traditional
Pixie and Dixie and Mr. Jinks	Comedy	3 seasons, 57 episodes	• William Hanna • Joseph Barbera	October 2, 1958 – October 13, 1961	• First-run syndication • ABC	Hanna-Barbera		Traditional
Bozo: The World's Most Famous Clown	• Slapstick comedy • Animation	157 episodes	Alan Livingston	1958–1962		Larry Harmon Pictures		Traditional
The Quick Draw McGraw Show	Comedy	3 seasons, 45 episodes	• William Hanna • Joseph Barbera	January 1, 1959 – October 20, 1961	Syndication	Hanna-Barbera	TV-G	Traditional
Clutch Cargo		52 episodes		March 9, 1959–1960		Cambria Productions		Traditional
Bucky and Pepito	Western	36 episodes		September 8, 1959 – March 22, 1960	Syndication	Trans-Artists Productions		Traditional
Augie Doggie and Doggie Daddy	• Comedy • Slice-of-life	3 seasons, 45 episodes	• William Hanna • Joseph Barbera	September 19, 1959 – October 20, 1962		Hanna-Barbera		Traditional
Felix the Cat	• Cartoon • Adventure • Comedy	2 seasons, 126 episodes	Joe Oriolo	October 2, 1958 – May 13, 1960	Syndication	• Felix the Cat Productions • Paramount Cartoon Studios • Trans-Lux		Traditional
Matty's Funday Funnies	Comedy	4 seasons, 68 episodes		October 11, 1959 – December 30, 1961	ABC	Famous Studios		Traditional
The Adventures of Rocky and Bullwinkle and Friends	• Surreal comedy • Slapstick • Variety	5 seasons, 163 episodes	• Jay Ward • Alex Anderson • Bill Scott	November 19, 1959 – June 27, 1964	• ABC (1959–61) • NBC (1961–64)	• Jay Ward Productions • Gamma Productions • Producers Associates of Television, Inc.	TV-G	Traditional
Capt'n Sailorbird		190 episodes		1959		Magic Screen Pictures Inc.		Traditional

== See also ==
- List of children's animated films
