= Colonel Bleep =

First color cartoon series on television

- VHS cover art Top row (L-R): Squeak, Scratch, Colonel Bleep; Bottom row (L-R): Black Patch, the Black Knight of Pluto, Bruto the Black Robot
- Genre: Science fiction
- Created by: Robert D. Buchanan; Jack Schleh
- Written by: Robert D. Buchanan
- Directed by: Jack Schleh
- Narrated by: Noah Tyler
- Country of origin: United States
- Original language: English
- No. of episodes: 100 (45 are known to survive)

Production
- Producer: Robert D. Buchanan
- Running time: 3–6 minutes
- Production companies: Soundac; Richard H. Ullman Inc.

Original release
- Network: Syndication
- Release: September 21, 1957 – May 9, 1960

Related
- Watch the Birdie; Mighty Mister Titan

Colonel Bleep is a 1957 American science fiction animated TV series which was the first color cartoon series made for television. It was created and written by Robert D. Buchanan and Jack Schleh on June 8, 1956, and was animated by Soundac, Inc. of Miami. The show was originally syndicated on September 21, 1957, as a segment on Uncle Bill's TV Club. One hundred episodes, of varying length of between three and six minutes each, were produced. Of these episodes, 45 episodes are known to exist in some form, eight of which are only available in black and white.

== Summary ==
Intro for the series

"Col. Bleep's Arrival on Earth", which introduces the characters and synopsizes the series

In 1945, the first nuclear explosion on Earth has cosmic effects: Scratch, a hibernating Stone Age caveman, is awakened and transported to the present by the blast; and the denizens of the possible exoplanet Futura become alarmed. The Futurians, an alien race with heads shaped like Reuleaux triangles and small, slender bodies, send one of their own, Colonel Bleep, to investigate. Upon reaching Earth, Bleep commissions Scratch as a deputy, with Bleep representing the future and Scratch the past.

Representing the present day is Squeak, a cowboy hat-wearing puppet ("a happy-go-lucky boy...very much like you") and former actor that can move on his own volition but cannot speak (as a puppet, he cannot speak on his own; this concept was eventually abandoned, and Squeak occasionally spoke in some of the later episodes). Together, the three establish a base at Zero Zero Island in the Atlantic Ocean to protect Earth's Solar System from extraterrestrial threats.

Colonel Bleep was typically seen with a transparent bubble as a helmet, with a helicopter-like propeller and two antennae. The propeller, used in conjunction with Bleep's ever-present unicycle, helped propel the creature through space. The antennae shot beams of "futomic energy" (a portmanteau of future and atomic), which could manifest itself in any number of ways, most commonly as a raygun. The amount of futomic energy Colonel Bleep could absorb at any given time was finite, and in a few episodes he runs out of energy and becomes vulnerable; there were also situations where the heat that the futomic beam generated would pose a hazard and make it an unsuitable choice. His helicopter could also be pressed into service as a drill or auger. Scratch's main weapons were his superhuman strength and a large club. Squeak, other than his unexplained sentience and ability to move on his own, had no identifiable superpowers.

The series drew heavy influence from the Space Age of its time. Occasionally, the planet Futura and its denizens would be seen; most of the series took place within Earth's Solar System, with intelligent life forms existing on most planets. Interplanetary travel was facilitated by robots, and a space station, X-1, served as a transportation hub. The accuracy of the science varied widely from episode to episode.

Episodes could follow any number of formats. Training episodes would often follow a format of binary oppositions in which the savvy learner Scratch would follow Bleep's instructions while the hotshot Squeak blew off his duties and got himself into trouble. Travelogues featured the trio visiting areas such as the Belgian Congo or New Orleans, with no substantial conflict. Most commonly, the trio would be pit against intergalactic villains, some of whom were recurring: the hooded archvillain Dr. Destructo, who escaped from the rings of Saturn early in the series; Bruto the Black Robot, Dr. Destructo's former henchman; Black Patch, a space pirate; and the Black Knight of Pluto.

== Production ==
A credits sequence that was produced for the Streamline VHS releases in the early 1990s

Colonel Bleep was produced by Soundac, Inc. Soundac was originally formed in 1951 in Buffalo, New York by Bobby Nicholson. After Nicholson left, Robert D. Buchanan took his place. In 1955, Soundac relocated to Miami, Florida.

A collection of wraparounds for a hosted show illustrated the initial concept of Colonel Bleep: the animated shorts would serve as the framework for a full-service children's variety show, complete with quizzes, riddles and interactive content. It may have had a public airing on Colonel Bleep's Buffalo affiliate, WGR-TV (channel 2).

The show was syndicated by Richard H. Ullman in Buffalo, and the wraparound segment reel was sponsored by the Canadian grocery store chain Loblaws, which had locations in the Buffalo area at the time.

The show's working title was The Adventures of Colonel Bleep. The animation in the show was extraordinarily limited animation, as was typical of TV animation during that era. Local newscaster Noah Tyler was the narrator for the show and provided virtually all of the vocal characterizations (most of the characters were mute). Jack Schleh directed all of the episodes. The design of the series was greatly influenced by the futuristic googie designs of the 1950s and early 1960s: space vehicles included angular designs and large tailfins, boomerangs were frequently incorporated into signs, architecture and some vehicles, and stereotypical atomic symbols were used frequently, particularly to represent Bleep's futomic energy.

Schleh and Buchanan also produced a series of syndicated physical fitness cartoons for children through Soundac called The Mighty Mister Titan. The series premiered on January 1, 1964, with 100 episodes airing.

== Legacy ==
Unlike contemporary animated television shorts of the era, which were mostly preserved, practically no original material from the production of Colonel Bleep is known to exist today.

The show aired as late as 1971. The copyrights of the show's episodes lapsed, without being renewed, in 1985, and the show is therefore in the public domain. Two videocassettes from the series were released by Streamline Pictures in 1991, containing most episodes still known to exist at the time (reportedly discovered in the film storage vault of a southwestern U.S. TV station which had formerly aired the show during a bankruptcy proceeding). Apart from "The Treacherous Pirate", no more episodes were released until August 23, 2005, when Alpha Video released a DVD entitled Colonel Bleep Volume 1. The DVD contains 23 episodes, about 20 of which do not appear on earlier video releases. Among the known episodes are the series premiere ("Col. Bleep's Arrival on Earth") and a clip show believed to be the series finale ("Test of Friendship").

Eight previously lost episodes were uploaded to YouTube on September 12, 2019, procured from sepia-toned black-and-white prints. A ninth lost episode ("Winner Take All") was also discovered and uploaded to YouTube on October 19, 2019; all nine of the rediscovered episodes were in the personal archives of Ron Kurer and his website Toon Tracker. In September 2018, animation historian Jerry Beck located black-and-white wraparounds, including the show's original title sequence, in the archives of Mark Kausler, and posted the film on YouTube. A higher-quality version of the wraparounds was uploaded to YouTube on February 18, 2024. In October 2019, YouTube user D Fan (Los Angeles radio personality Jhani Kaye) uploaded a kinescope of an episode of the Local children's show Cartoon Express with Engineer Bill which included a title card for the lost episode Squeak and the Black Knight; Kaye had previously included the Colonel Bleep snippet in a 2017 video posted on a previous account, but noted in a comment that the lost episode had already been cut from the film by the time he received it.

In March 2023, a lost episode "The Malicious Mailman" was discovered by film archivist Sarah Smith. The episode, a sequel to the existing episode "The Lunar Luger," was restored at Multicom Entertainment Group. and released on the streaming service The Archive on August 23, 2023.

One episode, "The Treacherous Pirate", can be seen as part of The Speed Racer Show, an anthology film released by Streamline Pictures in 1993; it was released on VHS, LaserDisc and DVD by Family Home Entertainment as Speed Racer: the Movie. The episode occurs between Speed Racer episodes ("The Car Hater" and "Race Against the Mammoth Car, Part 1"). Production notes for The Ren & Stimpy Show cite Colonel Bleep as an inspiration to the show's animators, and the episode "Space Madness" includes a recreation of Colonel Bleep's title sequence.

A clip from the Colonel Bleep episode "The Killer Whale" was seen in the Severance season two episode "The After Hours".

In February 2026, it was announced that Colonel Bleep would appear in the public domain-themed fighting game Royalty Free-For-All, which was released on August 11, 2026. Squeak and Scratch also appear as summons and Dr. Destructo appears as an alien item.

== See also ==
- List of animated television series of the 1940s and 1950s
