= List of children's animated television series of the 1970s =

This is a list of children's animated television series (including internet television series); that is, animated programs originally targeted towards audiences aged 12 and under in mind.

This list does not include Japanese, Chinese, or Korean series, as children's animation is much more common in these regions.

== 1970s ==
=== United States ===
Title	Genre	Seasons/episodes	Show creator(s)	Original release	Network	Studio	Age rating	Technique
Doctor Dolittle	Cartoon series	1 season, 17 episodes	• David H. DePatie • Friz Freleng • Paul Harrison • Lennie Weinrib	September 12, 1970 – September 2, 1971	NBC	• DePatie–Freleng Enterprises • 20th Century Fox Television	—N/a	Traditional
Groovie Goolies	• Comedy horror • Musical comedy	1 season, 16 episodes		September 12, 1970 – September 17, 1972	CBS	Filmation	TV-G	Traditional
Josie and the Pussycats		1 season, 16 episodes	• Dan DeCarlo • Richard Goldwater	September 12, 1970 – January 2, 1971	CBS	Hanna-Barbera Productions	TV-G	Traditional
Sabrina the Teenage Witch	• Comedy horror • Fantasy • Sitcom • Slapstick • Supernatural	1 season, 31 episodes		September 12, 1970 – August 31, 1974	• CBS • Syndicated	• Filmation Associates • The Sabrina Company	—N/a	Traditional
Will the Real Jerry Lewis Please Sit Down		1 season, 16 episodes	• Lou Scheimer • Norm Prescott	September 12, 1970 – September 2, 1972	ABC	Filmation	—N/a	Traditional
Archie's TV Funnies	Sitcom	1 season, 16 episodes	• John L. Goldwater (comic) • Bob Montana (characters)	September 11, 1971 – September 1, 1973	CBS	Filmation	—N/a	Traditional
Help!... It's the Hair Bear Bunch!		1 season, 16 episodes	• Joe Ruby • Ken Spears	September 11, 1971 – January 8, 1972	CBS	Hanna-Barbera Productions	TV-G	Traditional
The Jackson 5ive		2 seasons, 23 episodes		September 11, 1971 – October 14, 1972	ABC	• Rankin/Bass Productions • Motown Productions • Halas and Batchelor • Topcraft	TV-G	Traditional
The Pebbles and Bamm-Bamm Show		1 season, 16 episodes	• Charles A. Nichols (animation director) • William Hanna • Joseph Barbera	September 11, 1971 – January 1, 1972	CBS	Hanna-Barbera Productions	TV-G	Traditional
The Electric Company	Educational	6 seasons, 780 episodes	Joan Ganz Cooney; Lloyd Morrisett>br>Paul Dooley	October 25, 1971 – April 15, 1977	PBS	Children's Television Workshop	TV-Y	Traditional/Live-action
The Mouse Factory	Anthology	1 season, 43 episodes	Ward Kimball	January 26, 1972 – March 5, 1973	Syndication	The Walt Disney Company	—N/a	Traditional
Fat Albert and the Cosby Kids	• Comedy-drama • Educational	8 seasons, 110 episodes	Bill Cosby	September 9, 1972 – August 10, 1985	• CBS • First-run syndication	Filmation	TV-Y7	Traditional
Josie and the Pussycats in Outer Space		16 episodes		September 9, 1972 – December 23, 1972	CBS	Hanna-Barbera Productions	TV-G	Traditional
Sealab 2020		1 season, 13 episodes	Alex Toth	September 9, 1972 – December 2, 1972	NBC	Hanna-Barbera Productions	TV-Y7	Traditional
The Amazing Chan and the Chan Clan	Mystery	1 season, 16 episodes	Earl Derr Biggers (character)	September 9, 1972 – December 30, 1972	CBS	Hanna-Barbera Productions	—N/a	Traditional
The Barkleys	Animation	1 season, 13 episodes	• David H. DePatie • Friz Freleng • Joe Ruby • Ken Spears	September 9, 1972 – September 1, 1973	NBC	DePatie–Freleng Enterprises	—N/a	Traditional
The Brady Kids	Animation	2 seasons, 22 episodes	Sherwood Schwartz	September 9, 1972 – October 6, 1973	ABC	• Filmation • Paramount Television	TV-G	Traditional
The Flintstone Comedy Hour	Comedy	1 season, 18 episodes	• William Hanna • Joseph Barbera	September 9, 1972 – January 26, 1974	CBS	Hanna-Barbera Productions	TV-G	Traditional
The Houndcats		13 episodes	• Joe Ruby • Ken Spears	September 9, 1972 – December 2, 1972	NBC	DePatie–Freleng Enterprises	—N/a	Traditional
The Osmonds		17 episodes		September 9, 1972 – December 30, 1972	ABC	• Rankin/Bass Productions • Halas and Batchelor	—N/a	Traditional
The Roman Holidays	Animated sitcom	13 episodes		September 9, 1972 – December 2, 1972	NBC	Hanna-Barbera Productions	—N/a	Traditional
Lassie's Rescue Rangers	Animated	1 season, 15 episodes		November 11, 1972 – December 22, 1973	ABC	• Filmation Associates • Wrather Productions (as Wrather Corp.)	TV-G	Ended
Butch Cassidy	Mystery	1 season, 13 episodes		September 8, 1973 – December 1, 1973	NBC	Hanna-Barbera Productions	—N/a	Traditional
Emergency +4	Adventure cartoon	2 seasons, 23 episodes	• Harold Jack Bloom • R. A. Cinader (live-action basis program)	September 8, 1973 – November 30, 1974	NBC	• Fred Calvert Productions • Mark VII Limited • Universal Television	—N/a	Traditional
Goober and the Ghost Chasers	Mystery	1 season, 16 episodes		September 8, 1973 – December 22, 1973	ABC	Hanna-Barbera Productions	—N/a	Traditional
Inch High, Private Eye	• Comedy • Adventure • Mystery	1 season, 13 episodes		September 8, 1973 – August 31, 1974	NBC	Hanna-Barbera Productions	TV-G	Traditional
Jeannie	Comedy	1 season, 16 episodes		September 8, 1973 – December 22, 1973	CBS	• Hanna-Barbera Productions • Screen Gems • Columbia Pictures Television	—N/a	Traditional
Mission: Magic!	Cartoon series	1 season, 16 episodes		September 8, 1973 – December 22, 1973	ABC	• Filmation • Paramount Television	—N/a	Traditional
Speed Buggy		1 season, 16 episodes		September 8, 1973 – December 22, 1973	CBS	Hanna-Barbera Productions	TV-G	Traditional
Star Trek: The Animated Series		2 seasons, 22 episodes	Gene Roddenberry	September 8, 1973 – October 12, 1974	NBC	• Filmation • Norway Productions • Paramount Television Service	TV-Y7	Traditional
Super Friends	• Action • Adventure • Science fiction	16 episodes	• E. Nelson Bridwell • Carmine Infantino • Julius Schwartz (consultants)	September 8, 1973 – December 22, 1973	ABC	• Hanna-Barbera Productions • National Periodical Publications	—N/a	Traditional
The Addams Family	• Animated sitcom • Comedy horror	1 season, 16 episodes	Charles Addams	September 8, 1973 – December 22, 1973	NBC	Hanna-Barbera	—N/a	Traditional
Yogi's Gang	• Adventure • Comedy	15 episodes		September 8, 1973 – December 29, 1973	ABC	Hanna-Barbera Productions	—N/a	Traditional
Devlin	Comedy	16 episodes	• William Hanna • Joseph Barbera	September 7, 1974 – December 21, 1974	ABC	Hanna-Barbera Productions	—N/a	Traditional
Hong Kong Phooey	Comedy	1 season, 16 episodes	• William Hanna • Joseph Barbera	September 7, 1974 – December 21, 1974	ABC	Hanna-Barbera Productions	TV-G	Traditional
Partridge Family 2200 A.D.	Science fiction	1 season, 16 episodes		September 7, 1974 – March 8, 1975	CBS	• Hanna-Barbera Productions • Columbia Pictures Television	—N/a	Traditional
The New Adventures of Gilligan		1 season, 16 episodes	Sherwood Schwartz	September 7, 1974 – October 18, 1975	ABC	Filmation	TV-G	Traditional
These Are the Days		16 episodes		September 7, 1974 – September 27, 1975	ABC	Filmation	—N/a	Traditional
The U.S. of Archie	• Comedy • Historical	16 episodes	• John L. Goldwater (comic) • Bob Montana (characters)	September 7, 1974 – September 1976	CBS	Filmation	TV-Y7	Traditional
Valley of the Dinosaurs	• Adventure • Action • Drama • Science fiction	16 episodes		September 7, 1974 – December 21, 1974	CBS	Hanna-Barbera Productions	—N/a	Traditional
Wheelie and the Chopper Bunch	• Animation • Adventure • Action • Cartoon series • Science fiction	1 season, 13 episodes		September 7, 1974 – November 30, 1974	NBC	Hanna-Barbera Productions	TV-Y	Traditional
Return to the Planet of the Apes	Animation	13 episodes		September 6, 1975 – November 29, 1975	NBC	• DePatie–Freleng Enterprises • 20th Century Fox Television	—N/a	Traditional
The Great Grape Ape Show	• Animation • Comedy	1 season, 16 episodes		September 6, 1975 – December 13, 1975	ABC	Hanna-Barbera Productions	TV-Y	Traditional
The Oddball Couple	• Children's television series • Animation • Comedy • Cartoon series	1 season, 16 episodes		September 6, 1975 – December 20, 1975	ABC	• DePatie-Freleng Enterprises • Paramount Network Television	—N/a	Traditional
The Tom & Jerry Show	Animated sitcom	16 episodes		September 6, 1975 – December 13, 1975	ABC	Hanna-Barbera Productions	—N/a	Traditional
Clue Club	Animation	1 season, 16 episodes		August 14, 1976 – September 3, 1977	CBS	Hanna-Barbera Productions	TV-G	Traditional
Jabberjaw		1 season, 16 episodes	• Joe Ruby • Ken Spears	September 11, 1976 – December 18, 1976	ABC	Hanna-Barbera Productions	TV-G	Traditional
Tarzan, Lord of the Jungle		36 episodes	Edgar Rice Burroughs (characters)	August 14, 1976 – September 6, 1980	CBS	Filmation	—N/a	Traditional
The Mumbly Cartoon Show	Animation	16 episodes		September 11, 1976 – September 3, 1977	ABC	Hanna-Barbera Productions	—N/a	Traditional
The Scooby-Doo Show	• Comedy • Mystery • Adventure	3 seasons, 40 episodes	• Joe Ruby • Ken Spears	September 11, 1976 – December 23, 1978	ABC	Hanna-Barbera Productions	TV-G	Traditional
The Scooby-Doo/Dynomutt Hour		16 episodes	• Joe Ruby • Ken Spears	September 11, 1976 – December 18, 1976	ABC	Hanna-Barbera Productions	TV-G	Traditional
The New Adventures of Batman		1 season, 16 episodes		February 12, 1977 – May 28, 1977	CBS	• Filmation • DC Comics	—N/a	Traditional
Baggy Pants and the Nitwits	Cartoon series	1 season, 13 episodes	Arte Johnson	September 10, 1977 – December 3, 1977	NBC	DePatie-Freleng Enterprises	—N/a	Traditional
Captain Caveman and the Teen Angels		3 seasons, 40 episodes	• Joe Ruby • Ken Spears	September 10, 1977 – June 21, 1980	ABC	Hanna-Barbera Productions	TV-G	Traditional
CB Bears	• Animation • Comedy	13 episodes	Charles A. Nichols	September 10, 1977 – December 3, 1977	NBC	Hanna-Barbera Productions	—N/a	Traditional
I Am the Greatest: The Adventures of Muhammad Ali	Animation	1 season, 13 episodes	• Fred Calvert • Kimie Calvert • John Paxton	September 10, 1977 – December 3, 1977	NBC	Farmhouse Films	—N/a	Traditional
Laff-A-Lympics	• Comedy • Sports	2 seasons, 24 episodes	• Joe Ruby • Ken Spears	September 10, 1977 – October 28, 1978	ABC	Hanna-Barbera Productions	TV-G	Traditional
Scooby's All-Star Laff-A-Lympics	Comedy	24 episodes	• Joe Ruby • Ken Spears	September 10, 1977 – October 28, 1978	ABC	Hanna-Barbera Productions	TV-G	Traditional
Space Sentinels		13 episodes		September 10, 1977 – December 3, 1977	NBC	Filmation	—N/a	Traditional
The All-New Super Friends Hour	• Adventure • Fantasy • Science fiction	60 episodes	• E. Nelson Bridwell • Carmine Infantino • Julius Schwartz (consultants)	September 10, 1977 – September 2, 1978	ABC	• Hanna-Barbera Productions • DC Comics	—N/a	Traditional
The Batman/Tarzan Adventure Hour				September 10, 1977 – September 2, 1978	CBS	Filmation	—N/a	Traditional
The New Archie and Sabrina Hour		1 season, 13 episodes		September 10, 1977 – December 3, 1977	NBC	Filmation	—N/a	Traditional
Rickety Rocket		16 episodes		September 1, 1979 – January 1, 1980	ABC	• Ruby-Spears Productions	—N/a	Traditional
The New Adventures of Mighty Mouse and Heckle & Jeckle	Cartoon series	1 season, 16 episodes		September 8, 1979 – April 8, 1980	CBS	• Filmation • Viacom Productions	TV-Y7	Traditional
Buford and the Galloping Ghost	• Animation • Mystery • Comedy	13 episodes		September 9, 1978 – September 1, 1979	NBC	Hanna-Barbera	—N/a	Traditional
Challenge of the Superfriends	• Adventure • Fantasy • Science fiction • Superhero	2 seasons, 16 episodes	• E. Nelson Bridwell • Carmine Infantino • Julius Schwartz (consultants)	September 9, 1978 – December 23, 1978	ABC	• Hanna-Barbera Productions • DC Comics	TV-Y7	Traditional
Fangface	• Animation • Mystery	2 seasons, 32 episodes	• Joe Ruby • Ken Spears	September 9, 1978 – September 27, 1980	ABC	Ruby-Spears Productions	TV-G	Traditional
Galaxy Goof-Ups	• Animation • Adventure • Comedy	13 episodes		September 9, 1978 – September 1, 1979	NBC	Hanna-Barbera Productions	TV-Y7	Traditional
Tarzan and the Super 7		1 season, 16 episodes		September 9, 1978 – September 6, 1980	CBS	Filmation	—N/a	Traditional
The All New Popeye Hour	• Animation • Comedy	5 season, 56 episodes		September 9, 1978 – September 5, 1983	CBS	• Hanna-Barbera Productions • King Features Syndicate	TV-G	Traditional
The New Fantastic Four	• Superhero • Action • Adventure	1 season, 13 episodes	• Stan Lee • Jack Kirby	September 9, 1978 – December 16, 1978	NBC	• DePatie–Freleng Enterprises • Marvel Comics Animation	TV-Y7	Traditional
Yogi's Space Race	• Animation • Comedy • Adventure • Sports • Sci-fi • Fantasy	13 episodes		September 9, 1978 – December 2, 1978	NBC	Hanna-Barbera Productions	TV-G	Traditional
The New Fred and Barney Show	• Animation • Comedy	2 seasons, 17 episodes		February 3, 1979 – October 20, 1979	NBC	Hanna-Barbera Productions	TV-G	Traditional
Fred and Barney Meet the Thing	Animation	1 season, 13 episodes		September 8, 1979 – December 1, 1979	NBC	• Hanna-Barbera Productions • Marvel Comics Group	TV-G	Traditional
Casper and the Angels	• Animation • Adventure • Comedy • Sci-fi	13 episodes		September 22, 1979 – December 15, 1979	NBC	• Hanna-Barbera Productions • The Harvey Entertainment Company	—N/a	Traditional
Mighty Man and Yukk		32 episodes		September 22, 1979 – January 5, 1980	ABC	Ruby-Spears Productions	—N/a	Traditional
Scooby-Doo and Scrappy-Doo	• Comedy • Mystery • Adventure	1 seasons, 16 episodes	• Joe Ruby • Ken Spears	September 22, 1979 – January 5, 1980	ABC	Hanna-Barbera Productions	TV-G	Traditional
Spider-Woman	• Superhero • Action • Adventure	1 season, 16 episodes		September 22, 1979 – January 5, 1980	ABC	• DePatie-Freleng Enterprises • Marvel Comics Animation	TV-Y7	Traditional
The New Adventures of Flash Gordon		2 seasons, 32 episodes	Alex Raymond	September 22, 1979 – November 6, 1982	NBC	• Filmation • King Features Syndicate	TV-Y7	Traditional
The New Shmoo		1 seasons, 16 episodes	Al Capp	September 22, 1979 – November 15, 1980	NBC	Hanna-Barbera Productions	TV-G	Traditional
The Plastic Man Comedy/Adventure Show			• Joe Ruby • Ken Spears	September 22, 1979 – February 28, 1981	ABC	• Ruby-Spears Productions • DC Comics	TV-G	Traditional
The Super Globetrotters	Cartoon	1 season, 13 episodes		September 22, 1979 – December 15, 1979	NBC	Hanna-Barbera Productions	—N/a	Traditional
The World's Greatest SuperFriends	• Adventure • Superhero	8 episodes	• E. Nelson Bridwell • Carmine Infantino • Julius Schwartz (consultants)	September 22, 1979 – September 27, 1980	ABC	• Hanna-Barbera Productions • DC Comics	TV-Y7	Traditional

=== Co-productions ===
Title	Genre	Seasons/episodes	Show creator(s)	Original release	Network	Studio	Age rating	Technique
The Funky Phantom	• Comedy • Mystery • Adventure	17 episodes		September 11, 1971 – September 2, 1972	ABC	• Hanna-Barbera Productions • Air Programs International		Traditional
Mio Mao	Educational	3 seasons, 78 episodes	Francesco Misseri	1974 — 2007	Programma Nazionale; Five (series 2 and 3)	Misseri Studio		Stop-motion

== See also ==
- List of children's animated films
