= Robert D. Buchanan =

American animator

- Occupations: animator, producer
- Known for: co-creating Colonel Bleep
- Notable work: Colonel Bleep, Mighty Mr. Titan

Robert D. Buchanan is a creator of several animated features in the 1950s and 1960s. He joined Soundac following the departure of Bobby Nicholson, who formed the company in 1951. Buchanan relocated Soundac from its original location of Buffalo, New York to Miami, Florida in 1955; he maintained a sales and distribution agent, Richard H. Ullman, in Buffalo through the late 1950s.

He is most notable for co-creating the animated series Colonel Bleep, the first color cartoon produced for television, with Jack Schleh. Colonel Bleep was syndicated in 1957.

In 1965, Buchanan co-produced another animated series, Mighty Mr. Titan, which taught viewers how to exercise. Soundac also produced Weather Man, a series of short animated clips for stations that relied on Weather Bureau forecasts to relay the weather.

Buchanan and Soundac ceased operations in the early 1970s. Master tapes of his productions were stolen during the closedown process, and as a result, only a portion of the company's productions remain: roughly a third of Colonel Bleep episodes (some in their original color and others in sepia tone prints), and one black-and-white kinescope reel of Weather Man clips (Mighty Mr. Titan is believed to be mostly intact).
