= List of children's animated television series of the 1980s =

This is a list of children's animated television series (including internet television series); that is, animated programs originally targeted towards audiences aged 12 and under in mind.

This list does not include Japanese, Chinese, or Korean series, as children's animation is much more common in these regions.

== 1980s ==
=== United States ===
Title	Genre	Seasons/episodes	Show creator(s)	Original release	Network	Studio	Age rating	Technique
The Tom and Jerry Comedy Show	• Variety • Comedy	1 season, 15 episodes		September 6, 1980 – December 13, 1980	CBS	• Filmation • MGM Television	TV-G	Traditional
Super Friends	• Action • Adventure • Science fiction	3 seasons, 22 episodes		September 13, 1980–1982	ABC	• Hanna-Barbera Productions • DC Comics	TV-Y7	Traditional
The Tarzan/Lone Ranger Adventure Hour	Adventure			September 6, 1980 – December 13, 1980	CBS	Filmation	—N/a	Traditional
The Lone Ranger	Animated series	2 seasons, 28 episodes		September 13, 1980 – January 30, 1982	CBS	Filmation	—N/a	Traditional
Heathcliff	Animated series	2 seasons, 26 episodes	• George Gately (Heathcliff character) • Brad Anderson (Marmaduke character) • Joe Ruby • Ken Spears	October 4, 1980 – September 18, 1982	ABC	• Ruby-Spears Productions • McNaught Syndicate • United Features Syndicate (season 2)	TV-Y	Traditional
Thundarr the Barbarian	• Post-apocalyptic • Science fantasy • Action-adventure	2 seasons, 21 episodes	• Steve Gerber • Joe Ruby • Ken Spears	October 4, 1980 – October 31, 1981	ABC	Ruby-Spears Productions	TV-Y7	Traditional
Richie Rich	Animation	4 seasons, 41 episodes		November 8, 1980 – September 1, 1984	ABC	Hanna-Barbera Productions	TV-G	Traditional
Scooby-Doo and Scrappy-Doo	• Adventure • Comedy	3 seasons, 33 episodes	• Joe Ruby • Ken Spears	November 8, 1980 – December 18, 1982	ABC	• Hanna-Barbera Productions • Ruby-Spears Enterprises	TV-G	Traditional
The Fonz and the Happy Days Gang	• Science fiction • Comedy • Adventure	2 seasons, 24 episodes	• Duane Pool • Tom Swale	November 8, 1980 – November 28, 1981	ABC	• Hanna-Barbera Productions • Paramount Television	—N/a	Traditional
The Flintstone Comedy Show	• Animation • Comedy	2 seasons, 18 episodes	• William Hanna • Joseph Barbera	November 22, 1980 – October 24, 1981	NBC	Hanna-Barbera Productions	TV-G	Traditional
Blackstar		1 season, 13 episodes		September 12, 1981 – December 5, 1981	CBS	Filmation	—N/a	Traditional
Goldie Gold and Action Jack		1 season, 13 episodes	Steve Gerber	September 12, 1981 – December 5, 1981	ABC	Ruby-Spears Enterprises	TV-Y7	Traditional
Space Stars	• Animation • Adventure • Fantasy • Science fiction • Comedy-drama	1 season, 11 episodes		September 12, 1981 – September 11, 1982	NBC	Hanna-Barbera Productions	—N/a	Traditional
Spider-Man and His Amazing Friends	• Superhero • Action • Adventure	3 seasons, 24 episodes	Stan Lee	September 12, 1981 – November 5, 1983	NBC	Marvel Productions	TV-Y7	Traditional
The Kid Super Power Hour with Shazam!	Fantasy	1 season, 12 episodes		September 12, 1981 – September 11, 1982	NBC	• Filmation • DC Comics	—N/a	Traditional
The New Adventures of Zorro	Animation	1 season, 13 episodes	• William Hanna • Joseph Barbera • Johnston McCulley (characters)	September 12, 1981 – December 5, 1981	CBS	• Filmation • Hanna-Barbera	—N/a	Traditional
Trollkins	• Fantasy • Comedy	1 season, 13 episodes		September 12, 1981 – September 4, 1982	CBS	Hanna-Barbera Productions	TV-G	Traditional
Laverne & Shirley	Comedy	2 seasons, 21 episodes	• Duane Poole • Tom Swale	October 10, 1981 – November 13, 1982	ABC	• Hanna-Barbera Productions • Paramount Television	—N/a	Traditional
Gilligan's Planet		1 season, 13 episodes	Sherwood Schwartz	September 18, 1982 – December 11, 1982	CBS	• Warner Bros. Television Distribution • Turner Program Services	—N/a	Traditional
Meatballs & Spaghetti	Animation	1 season, 25 episodes	• Fred Silverman • Jerry Eisenberg	September 18, 1982 – March 5, 1983	CBS	• Intermedia Entertainment Company • Marvel Productions • Pan Sang East Co. Ltd • MGM/UA Television	—N/a	Traditional
Pandamonium	• Adventure • Fantasy	1 season, 13 episodes		September 18, 1982 – December 11, 1982	CBS	• Marvel Productions • InterMedia Entertainment Company • MGM/UA Television	—N/a	Traditional
Shirt Tales	• Fantasy • Comedy • Adventure	2 seasons, 23 episodes	Janet Elizabeth Manco (original characters)	September 18, 1982 – November 19, 1983	NBC	Hanna-Barbera Productions	TV-Y7	Traditional
The Flintstone Funnies	• Animation • Comedy	1 season, 45 episodes	• William Hanna • Joseph Barbera	September 18, 1982 – September 8, 1984	NBC	Hanna-Barbera Productions	TV-G	Traditional
The Gary Coleman Show	Comedy	1 season, 13 episodes	• William Hanna • Joseph Barbera	September 18, 1982 – December 11, 1982	NBC	Hanna-Barbera Productions	TV-G	Traditional
The Incredible Hulk	• Superhero • Action • Adventure	1 season, 13 episodes	Stan Lee	September 18, 1982 – October 8, 1983	NBC	Marvel Productions	TV-Y7	Traditional
Mork & Mindy/Laverne & Shirley/Fonz Hour	Cartoon series	1 season, 27 episodes		September 25, 1982 – September 3, 1983	ABC	• Hanna-Barbera Productions • Ruby-Spears Enterprises • Paramount Television	TV-G	Traditional
Pac-Man	• Adventure • Comedy	2 seasons, 44 episodes	Jeffrey Scott	September 25, 1982 – November 5, 1983	ABC	Hanna-Barbera Productions	TV-G	Traditional
The Little Rascals	• Animation • Comedy	1 season, 22 episodes		September 25, 1982 – December 2, 1983	ABC	• Hanna-Barbera Productions • King World Productions	TV-Y	Traditional
The Puppy's Further Adventures		2 seasons, 21 episodes	• Joe Ruby • Ken Spears	September 25, 1982 – November 10, 1984	ABC	• Ruby-Spears Enterprises • Hanna-Barbera Productions (season 1)	TV-Y	Traditional
The Scooby & Scrappy-Doo/Puppy Hour	• Animation • Comedy • Adventure • Action	1 season, 13 episodes		September 25, 1982 – December 18, 1982	ABC	• Hanna-Barbera Productions • Ruby-Spears Enterprises	TV-G	Traditional
The Dukes	• Action • Family • Comedy	2 seasons, 20 episodes	Ray Parker	February 5, 1983 – October 29, 1983	CBS	• Hanna-Barbera Productions • Warner Bros. Television	—N/a	Traditional
Good Morning, Mickey!	Anthology series	1 season, 83 episodes		April 18, 1983 – November 28, 1992	Disney Channel	The Walt Disney Company	—N/a	Traditional
Donald Duck Presents	Anthology series	2 seasons		September 1, 1983 – November 1, 1985	Disney Channel	The Walt Disney Company	—N/a	Traditional
He-Man and the Masters of the Universe (1983)	• Adventure • Action • Sword and planet • Superhero fiction	2 seasons, 130 episodes	Michael Halperin	September 5, 1983 – November 21, 1985	First-run syndication	• Filmation Associates • Mattel	TV-Y7	Traditional
Monchhichis	• Animation • Comedy • Fantasy • Adventure	1 season, 13 episodes		September 10, 1983 – December 24, 1983	ABC	Hanna-Barbera Productions	TV-Y	Traditional
Rubik, the Amazing Cube	Adventure	1 season, 13 episodes		September 10, 1983 – December 10, 1983	ABC	Ruby-Spears Enterprises	—N/a	Traditional
The New Scooby and Scrappy-Doo Show	• Mystery • Adventure • Comedy	2 seasons, 26 episodes	• Joe Ruby • Ken Spears	September 10, 1983 – December 1, 1984	ABC	Hanna-Barbera Productions	TV-G	Traditional
G.I. Joe: A Real American Hero (1983)	• Action-adventure • Military science fiction	2 seasons, 95 episodes	Hasbro	September 12, 1983 – November 20, 1986	Syndication	Sunbow Entertainment	TV-Y7	Traditional
Alvin and the Chipmunks	• Comedy-drama • Musical • Sitcom • Adventure	8 seasons, 102 episodes	• Ross Bagdasarian Jr. • Janice Karman	September 17, 1983 – December 1, 1990	NBC	• Bagdasarian Productions • Ruby-Spears Enterprises (1983–87, seasons 1–5) • Murakami-Wolf-Swenson (1988, season 6) • DIC Enterprises (1988–90, seasons 6–8)	TV-G	Traditional
Dungeons & Dragons	• Action • Adventure • Fantasy	3 seasons, 27 episodes	• Kevin Paul Coates • Dennis Marks • Takashi	September 17, 1983 – December 7, 1985	CBS	• Marvel Productions • D&D Entertainment • Toei Animation	TV-Y7	Traditional
Mister T	• Action • Adventure	3 seasons, 30 episodes	• Steve Gerber • Martin Pasko	September 17, 1983 – October 19, 1985	NBC	Ruby-Spears Enterprises	TV-Y7	Traditional
Saturday Supercade	• Anthology • Comedy	2 seasons, 27 episodes		September 17, 1983 – December 1, 1984	CBS	Ruby-Spears Enterprises	TV-G	Traditional
The Biskitts	• Adventure • Fantasy • Comedy	1 season, 13 episodes		September 17, 1983 – September 8, 1984	CBS	Hanna-Barbera Productions	TV-Y	Traditional
The Charlie Brown and Snoopy Show	• Animation • Comedy	2 seasons, 18 episodes	Charles M. Schulz	September 17, 1983 – October 12, 1985	CBS	Lee Mendelson/Bill Melendez Productions	TV-Y	Traditional
Dragon's Lair	• Fantasy • Animation • Action • Adventure • Sword and sorcery	1 season, 13 episodes	Ruby-Spears Productions	September 8, 1984 – December 1, 1984	ABC	Ruby-Spears Productions	TV-Y7	Traditional
Pink Panther and Sons	• Animation • Comedy • Adventure	1 season, 16 episodes		September 8, 1984 – February 26, 1985	• NBC (1984–85) • ABC (1986)	• Hanna-Barbera Productions • Mirisch-Geoffrey–DePatie-Freleng • MGM/UA Television	TV-Y	Traditional
Super Friends: The Legendary Super Powers Show	• Adventure • Fantasy • Science fiction	1 season, 8 episodes	• E. Nelson Bridwell • Carmine Infantino • Julius Schwartz (consultants)	September 8, 1984 – August 31, 1985	ABC	• Hanna-Barbera Productions • DC Comics	—N/a	Traditional
Wolf Rock TV	Animated series	1 season, 7 episodes	• Len Janson • Chuck Menville	September 8, 1984 – October 20, 1984	ABC	• Dick Clark Productions • DIC Enterprises	—N/a	Traditional
Muppet Babies (1984)	• Animated series • Fantasy • Comedy • Adventure	8 seasons, 107 episodes	Jim Henson	September 15, 1984 – November 2, 1991	CBS	• Marvel Productions • Jim Henson Productions	TV-Y	Traditional
Pole Position	Animated television series	1 season, 13 episodes	Jean Chalopin	September 15, 1984 – December 8, 1984	CBS	DIC Audiovisuel	TV-Y7	Traditional
Turbo Teen	• Cartoon series • Children's television series • Superheroes • Adventure	1 season, 13 episodes	Ruby-Spears Productions	September 15, 1984 – August 31, 1985	ABC	Ruby-Spears Enterprises	TV-Y7	Traditional
The Transformers	• Science fiction • Action • Adventure • Superhero	4 seasons, 98 episodes	• Hasbro • Takara	September 17, 1984 – November 11, 1987	First-run syndication	• Sunbow Productions • Marvel Productions • Toei Animation (seasons 1–3) • AKOM (seasons 2–4)	TV-Y7	Traditional
The 13 Ghosts of Scooby-Doo	• Mystery • Adventure • Comedy	2 seasons, 26 episodes	• Joe Ruby (characters) • Ken Spears (characters) •Mitch Schauer	September 7, 1985 – December 7, 1985	ABC	Hanna-Barbera Productions	TV-G	Traditional
The Super Powers Team: Galactic Guardians	• Adventure • Fantasy • Science fiction	1 season, 8 episodes	• E. Nelson Bridwell • Carmine Infantino • Julius Schwartz (consultants)	September 7, 1985 – September 6, 1986	ABC	• Hanna-Barbera Productions • DC Comics	—N/a	Traditional
ThunderCats (1985)	• Action/Adventure • Sword and planet	4 seasons, 130 episodes	Ted "Tobin" Wolf	September 9, 1985 – September 29, 1989	Syndication	• Rankin/Bass Animated Entertainment • Leisure Concepts (project development)		Traditional
She-Ra: Princess of Power (1985)	• Adventure • Action • Sword and planet • Superhero fiction	2 seasons, 93 episodes	• Larry DiTillio • J. Michael Straczynski	September 9, 1985 – December 12, 1987	First-run syndication	• Filmation Associates • Mattel	TV-Y7	Traditional
Adventures of the Gummi Bears	• Adventure • Comedy • Fantasy	6 seasons, 65 episodes	• Michael Eisner • Art Vitello • Jymn Magon	September 14, 1985 – February 22, 1991	• NBC (1985–89) • ABC (1989–90) • Syndicated (1990–91)	Walt Disney Television Animation	TV-Y	Traditional
Hulk Hogan's Rock 'n' Wrestling	Animated series	2 seasons, 26 episodes	World Wrestling Federation	September 14, 1985 – October 18, 1986	CBS	• DIC Animation City • World Wrestling Federation • Saban Productions (1985 special episode only) • Columbia Pictures Television (1985 special episode only)	TV-Y7	Traditional
It's Punky Brewster	• Family • Fantasy	2 seasons, 26 episodes		September 14, 1985 – December 6, 1986	NBC	• Ruby-Spears Enterprises • NBC Productions	TV-Y	Traditional
The Wuzzles		1 season, 13 episodes	Fred Wolf	September 14, 1985 – December 7, 1985	CBS	• Walt Disney Pictures Television Division • Walt Disney Pictures Television Animation Group	TV-Y	Traditional
Jem	• Romance • Science fiction • Musical	3 seasons, 65 episodes	Hasbro	November 3, 1985 – May 2, 1988	Syndication	Sunbow Entertainment	TV-Y7	Traditional
The Flintstone Kids	• Animation • Comedy	2 seasons, 34 episodes	• William Hanna • Joseph Barbera	September 6, 1986 – May 21, 1988	ABC	Hanna-Barbera Productions	TV-Y	Traditional
Foofur	• Animation • Slice of life • Comedy	2 seasons, 26 episodes	Phil Mendez	September 13, 1986 – February 18, 1988	NBC	• Hanna-Barbera Productions • SEPP International S.A.	TV-Y	Traditional
Kissyfur	Animation	2 seasons, 26 episodes	Phil Mendez	September 13, 1986 – August 25, 1990	NBC	• NBC Productions • DIC Animation City • Saban Entertainment (1988)	TV-Y	Traditional
Lazer Tag Academy	Animation	1 season, 13 episodes	Dan DiStefano	September 13, 1986 – December 6, 1986	NBC	• Ruby-Spears Productions • Worlds of Wonder	—N/a	Traditional
Pound Puppies (1986)	• Comedy • Adventure	2 seasons, 26 episodes		September 13, 1986 – December 19, 1987	ABC	• Hanna-Barbera Productions • Tonka Corporation	TV-Y	Traditional
Teen Wolf	• Adventure • Comedy	2 seasons, 21 episodes		September 13. 1986 – November 7, 1987	CBS	• Southern Star Productions • Hanna-Barbera Australia • Clubhouse Pictures (season 1) • Atlantic/Kushner-Locke (season 2)	TV-Y7	Traditional
The Real Ghostbusters	• Supernatural • Science fiction comedy	7 seasons, 140 episodes	• Joe Medjuck • Michael C. Gross	September 13, 1986 – October 5, 1991	• ABC • Syndicated (1987)	DIC Enterprises	TV-Y7	Traditional
Wildfire	• Animation • Adventure • Drama • Fantasy • Sci-fi	1 season, 13 episodes	• Jeff Segal • Kelly Ward	September 13, 1986 – December 13, 1986	CBS	Hanna-Barbera Productions	—N/a	Traditional
My Little Pony	Fantasy	2 seasons, 65 episodes		September 15, 1986 – September 25, 1987	Syndication	• Hasbro • Toei Animation • AKOM • Sunbow Productions • Marvel Productions	TV-Y	Traditional
Dennis the Menace (1986)		2 seasons, 78 episodes		September 22, 1986 – March 26, 1988	• Syndication (1986–87) • CBS (1988)	• DIC Animation City • Crawleys Animation (Season 2 only)	TV-G	Traditional
The Comic Strip		1 season, 65 episodes	• Jules Bass • Arthur Rankin Jr.	September 7 – December 4, 1987	Syndication	Rankin/Bass Animated Entertainment	TV-G	Traditional
Fraggle Rock: The Animated Series		1 season, 13 episodes	Jim Henson	September 12, 1987 – December 5, 1987	NBC	• Marvel Productions • Jim Henson Productions	TV-Y	Traditional
The New Archies	Sitcom	1 season, 13 episodes	Kimmer Ringwald	September 12, 1987 – December 5, 1987	NBC	• DIC Animation City • Archie Comics • Saban Productions	TV-Y	Traditional
DuckTales (1987)	• Action/Adventure • Comedy	4 seasons, 100 episodes	• Jymn Magon • Tedd Anasti • Patsy Cameron	September 18, 1987 – November 28, 1990	Syndication	• Walt Disney Television • Walt Disney Television Animation	TV-G	Traditional
Mighty Mouse: The New Adventures	• Action • Adventure • Comedy • Superhero	2 seasons, 19 episodes	Ralph Bakshi	September 19, 1987 – October 22, 1988	• CBS • Nickelodeon • Fox Kids	• Bakshi Animation • Bakshi-Hyde Ventures • Viacom Productions • Terrytoons	TV-Y7	Traditional
Popeye and Son	• Animated sitcom • Comedy	1 season, 13 episodes	• Jeff Segal • Kelly Ward • John Loy	September 19, 1987 – December 12, 1987	CBS	• Hanna-Barbera Productions • King Features Entertainment	TV-Y	Traditional
The Little Clowns of Happytown	Children	1 season, 18 episodes	Chuck Lorre	September 26, 1987 – July 16, 1988	ABC	• Murakami Wolf Swenson • ABC Entertainment • Marvel Productions	TV-Y	Traditional
ALF: The Animated Series		2 seasons, 26 episodes	• Paul Fusco • Tom Patchett	September 26, 1987 – January 7, 1989	NBC	• DIC Animation City • Saban Entertainment • Alien Productions	TV-Y	Traditional
Little Wizards		1 season, 18 episodes	• Len Janson • Chuck Menville	September 26, 1987–1988	ABC	Marvel Productions	—N/a	Traditional
HBO Storybook Musicals		1 season, 18 episodes		November 18, 1987 – December 8, 1993	HBO	HBO	—N/a	Traditional
Teenage Mutant Ninja Turtles (1987)	• Action-adventure • Martial arts • Superhero • Comedy (seasons 1–7) • Drama (seasons 8–10)	10 seasons, 193 episodes		December 28, 1987 – November 2, 1996	• Syndication (1987–90); CBS (1990–96)	• Murakami-Wolf-Swenson (1987–91, seasons 1–5) • IDDH • Fred Wolf Films (1992–96, seasons 6–10) • Mirage Studios • Surge Licensing • Toei Animation (1987–89, seasons 1–3) • Group W Productions (1987–95, seasons 1–9) • King World Productions	TV-Y7	Traditional
Gumby Adventures		1 season, 99 episodes		January 2, 1988 – December 31, 1988	Syndication	• Clokey Productions • Lorimar-Telepictures	TV-G	Stop-motion
The New Adventures of Winnie the Pooh	• Children's television series • Educational	4 seasons, 50 episodes	• Mark Zaslove • Karl Geurs	January 17, 1988 – October 26, 1991	• The Disney Channel (January 17 – April 10, 1988) • ABC (November 12, 1988 – October 26, 1991)	Walt Disney Television Animation	TV-Y	Traditional
A Pup Named Scooby-Doo	• Mystery • Comedy horror • Self-parody	4 seasons, 27 episodes	Tom Ruegger	September 10, 1988 – August 17, 1991	ABC	Hanna-Barbera Productions	TV-G	Traditional
ALF Tales		2 seasons, 21 episodes	• Paul Fusco • Tom Patchett	September 10, 1988 – December 9, 1989	NBC	• DIC Animation City • Saban Entertainment • Alien Productions	TV-Y	Traditional
The Completely Mental Misadventures of Ed Grimley	• Animation/Live action • Comedy • Satire	1 season, 13 episodes	Colossal Pictures, Inc.	September 10, 1988 – December 3, 1988	NBC	• Hanna-Barbera Productions • SEPP International S.A.	TV-Y7	Traditional
The New Adventures of Beany and Cecil	Animation	1 season, 5 episodes	John Kricfalusi	September 10, 1988 – October 29, 1988	ABC	• DIC Animation City • Bob Clampett Productions • Spümcø	—N/a	Traditional
Garfield and Friends	Comedy	7 seasons, 121 episodes	Jim Davis	September 17, 1988 – December 10, 1994	CBS	• Film Roman Productions • United Media Productions (seasons 1–6) • Paws, Inc. • Lee Mendelson Film Productions	TV-G	Traditional
The Adventures of Raggedy Ann and Andy	• Children • Adventure • Fantasy	13 episodes	Janis Diamond	17 September 1988 – 1 September 1990	CBS	CBS Entertainment Productions	—N/a	Traditional
Superman	• Action • Adventure • Superhero	1 season, 13 episodes		September 17, 1988 – December 10, 1988	CBS	• Ruby-Spears Enterprises • DC Comics • Toei Animation • Daiwon Animation	—N/a	Traditional
G.I. Joe: A Real American Hero (1989)	• Action-adventure • Military science fiction	2 seasons, 44 episodes	Hasbro	September 4, 1989 – January 20, 1992	Syndication	Sunbow Entertainment	TV-Y7	Traditional
Captain N: The Game Master	• Action • Adventure • Comedy	3 seasons, 34 episodes		September 9, 1989 – October 26, 1991	NBC	• DIC Animation City • Saban Entertainment (season 1 only)	TV-Y7	Traditional
The Karate Kid	Children's television series	1 season, 13 episodes	Dan DiStefano	September 9, 1989 – December 16, 1989	NBC	• DIC Animation City • Saban Entertainment • Columbia Pictures Television	TV-Y7	Traditional
Dink, the Little Dinosaur		2 seasons, 21 episodes		September 16, 1989 – November 3, 1990	CBS	Ruby-Spears Enterprises	TV-Y	Traditional
Rude Dog and the Dweebs		1 season, 13 episodes		16 September 1989 – 16 December 1989	CBS	• Marvel Productions • New World Television • Just for Kids • Sun Sportswear	TV-Y	Traditional
The California Raisin Show	Family	1 season, 13 episodes	Barry Bruce	September 16, 1989 – December 9, 1989	CBS		• Fred Wolf Films • Will Vinton Productions	Traditional

=== United Kingdom ===
Title	Genre	Seasons/episodes	Show creator(s)	Original release	Network	Studio	Technique
Postman Pat	• Children's • Animated television series	8 seasons, 184 episodes	John Cunliffe	• Original series: 16 September 1981 – 20 March 2006 • Special Delivery Service: 29 September 2008 – 29 March 2017	• BBC One (1981–2002) • BBC Two (2008–14) • CBeebies (2002–17) • CBBC (1985–2008) • Tiny Pop (2016–18)	• Woodland Animations (1981–96) • Entertainment Rights (2003–08) • Cosgrove Hall Films (2003–08) • Classic Media (2013) • Mackinnon and Saunders (2013–17) • DreamWorks Classic Productions (2015–17)	Stop-motion
Danger Mouse (1981)	• Action • Adventure • Comedy • Spy-fi	10 seasons, 89 episodes	• Brian Cosgrove • Mark Hall	28 September 1981 – 3 March 1992	ITV	• Cosgrove Hall Productions • Thames Television	Traditional
Gran	• Children's • Animated television series	1 season, 13 episodes	Michael and Joanne Cole	17 February – 12 May 1983	BBC1	Woodland Animations	Stop-motion
Henry's Cat	• Comedy • Adventure	5 seasons, 51 episodes	Bob Godfrey	12 September 1983 – 10 June 1993	BBC1	Bob Godfrey Films Ltd.	Traditional
Rocky Hollow	•Comedy •Family •Fantasy	1 season, 26 episodes	John Walker	1983–1984, 1985–1986	S4C (1983–84); The Children's Channel (1985–86)	Bumper Films	Stop-motion/Puppets
The Wind in the Willows	Animated television series	5 seasons, 65 episodes	Mark Hall, Brian Cosgrove	1 October 1984 – 19 June 1990	ITV	Cosgrove Hall Productions, Thames Television	Stop-motion
Thomas & Friends	Animated series	24 seasons, 578 episodes	Britt Allcroft	9 October 1984 – 20 January 2021	• ITV/ITV1 (series 1–3) • Direct-to-video (series 4–5) • Nick Jr. Channel (series 6–11) • Channel 5 (series 9–24)	• Clearwater Features (1984–86) • Britt Allcroft Ltd./Britt Allcroft (Thomas) Ltd. (1984–86) • The Britt Allcroft Company/Gullane Entertainment (1991–2002) • HIT Entertainment (2003–16) • Mattel Creations (2017–21)	Stop-motion (seasons 1–12)/CGI (seasons 12–24)
The Little Green Man	•Children's • Animated television series	1 season, 13 episodes	Matthew Smith	3 January – 28 March 1985	ITV/ITV1	• Pentagon Motion Pictures • Central Independent Television	Traditional
Bertha	• Children's • Animated television series	1 season, 13 episodes	Eric Charles and Stephen Flewers	1 April 1985 - 18 June 1986	BBC 1/BBC 2	Woodland Animations	Stop-motion
Fireman Sam	• Children's • Animated television series	15 seasons, 309 episodes	Dave Gingell, Dave Jones and Rob Lee	17 November 1987 – present	• BBC One (1987–2005) • BBC Two (2005) • CBeebies (2005) • Cartoonito (2008–present) • Channel 5 (2012–present) • S4C (Welsh version)	• Bumper Films (1987–94) • HIT Entertainment (2005–17) • Siriol Productions (2005) • Xing Xing (2008–16) • Mattel Television (2017–present) • Island of Misfits (2017–20) • WildBrain Studios (2020–present)	Stop-motion (seasons 1–5)/CGI (seasons 6–present)
Charlie Chalk	• Children's • Animated television series	1 season, 13 episodes	Ivor Wood	20 October 1988 – 19 April 1989	BBC1	Woodland Animations	Stop-motion

=== Co-productions ===
Title	Genre	Seasons/episodes	Show creator(s)	Original release	Network	Studio	Technique
Drak Pack	Adventure	1 season, 16 episodes		September 6, 1980 – December 20, 1980	CBS	Hanna-Barbera Pty. Ltd.	Traditional
The Kwicky Koala Show	• Animation • Comedy	1 season, 16 episodes	Tex Avery	September 12, 1981 – September 11, 1982	CBS	• Hanna-Barbera Productions • Hanna-Barbera Pty. Ltd.	Traditional
The Smurfs (1981)	• Adventure • Fantasy • Comedy	9 seasons, 256 episodes	Pierre "Peyo" Culliford	September 12, 1981 – December 2, 1989	NBC	• Hanna-Barbera Productions • SEPP International S.A. (seasons 1–7) • Lafig S.A. (seasons 8–9)	Traditional
The Littles		3 seasons, 29 episodes	• John Peterson • Jim Schumann	September 10, 1983 – November 2, 1985	• United States: ABC • France: Canal+ (season 1) • TF1 (seasons 2–3)	Hanna-Barbera Productions	Traditional
Inspector Gadget (1983)	• Science fiction • Comedy	2 seasons, 85 episodes	• Bruno Bianchi • Andy Heyward • Jean Chalopin	September 12, 1983 – February 1, 1986	First-run syndication	• DIC Audiovisuel • Cuckoo's Nest Studios • LBS • Nelvana (season 1) • Field Communications (season 1) • TMS (season 1)	Traditional
The Get Along Gang		1 season, 13 episodes	Those Characters from Cleveland	May 6, 1984 – December 8, 1984	• Nickelodeon (pilot) • CBS (TV series)	• DIC Audiovisuel • Nelvana (pilot episode)	Traditional
Mighty Orbots	• Action-adventure • Science fiction • Comedy • Superhero • Mecha	1 season, 13 episodes	Barry Glasser	September 8, 1984 – December 15, 1984	ABC	• MGM/UA Television • TMS Entertainment, Inc. • Intermedia Entertainment	Traditional
Snorks	• Adventure • Fantasy • Comedy • Sci-fi	4 seasons, 65 episodes	Nic Broca	September 15, 1984 – May 13, 1989	• NBC (1982, 1984–1986) • Syndication (1987–1989)	• Hanna-Barbera Productions • SEPP International S.A.	Traditional
Star Wars: Droids	• Adventure • Science fiction • Action	1 season, 13 episodes	• Peter Sauder • Ben Burtt	September 7, 1985 – June 7, 1986	ABC	• Nelvana • Lucasfilm • 20th Century Fox Television	Traditional
Star Wars: Ewoks		2 seasons, 26 episodes	• Paul Dini • Bob Carrau	September 9, 1985 – September 29, 1989	ABC	• Nelvana • Lucasfilm	Traditional
My Pet Monster		1 season, 13 episodes	Peter Sauder	September 12, 1987 – December 19, 1987	ABC	• Nelvana • Those Characters From Cleveland • Telefilm Canada	Traditional
The Berenstain Bears	• Children's series • Comedy	2 seasons, 52 episodes	Joe Cates	September 14, 1985 – September 5, 1987	CBS	• Southern Star Productions • Hanna-Barbera Australia	Traditional
Care Bears		4 seasons, 60 episodes	• Linda Denham • Elena Kucharik	September 14, 1985 – December 25, 1988	• DIC series: Syndication • Nelvana series: Global Television Network (Canada); ABC (United States)	• Atkinson Film-Arts (1983 and 1984 pilot/specials) • DIC Audiovisuel (1985) • Nelvana (1986–88)	Traditional
Galaxy High School	• Science fiction • Comedy	1 season, 13 episodes	Chris Columbus	September 13, 1986 – December 6, 1986	CBS	TMS Entertainment	Traditional
Hello Kitty's Furry Tale Theater	• Comedy • Family • Adventure • Fantasy	1 season, 13 episodes	Sanrio	September 19, 1987 – December 12, 1987	CBS	• DIC Enterprises • Toei Animation	Traditional
Beetlejuice	• Fantasy comedy • Comedy horror	4 seasons, 94 episodes	Tim Burton	September 9, 1989 – December 6, 1991	ABC	• Nelvana Limited • The Geffen Film Company • Warner Bros. Television • Tim Burton Inc.	Traditional
Camp Candy	Animated series	3 seasons, 40 episodes	• Joel Andryc • Ellen Levy • Phil Harnage	September 9, 1989 – Fall 1992	• NBC (1989–90) • Syndication (1991–92)	• DIC Animation City • Saban Entertainment	Traditional

== See also ==
- List of children's animated films
