= List of children's animated television series of the 2020s =

This is a list of children's animated television series (including internet television series); that is, animated programs originally targeting audiences under the age of 18.

This list does not include Japanese, Chinese, or Korean series.

== 2020s ==
=== United States ===
Title	Genre	Seasons/episodes	Show creator(s)	Original release	Network	Studio	Age rating	Technique	Sources
Go! Go! Cory Carson	Educational	4 seasons, 28 episodes	Stanley Moore Alex Woo	January 4, 2020 – October 21, 2021	Netflix	Kuku Studios Superprod Studio VTech	TV-Y	CGI	
The Owl House	Fantasy Comedy horror Comedy drama	3 seasons, 43 episodes	Dana Terrace	January 10, 2020 – April 8, 2023	Disney Channel	Disney Television Animation	TV-Y7	Traditional	
Glitch Techs	Action	2 seasons, 19 episodes	Eric Robles Dan Milano	February 21 – August 17, 2020	Netflix	Nickelodeon Animation Studios	TV-Y7	Flash	
ThunderCats Roar	Comedy Action/Adventure Sword and planet Science fantasy	1 season, 52 episodes	Victor Courtright Marly Halpern-Graser	February 22 – December 5, 2020	Cartoon Network	Warner Bros. Animation	TV-Y7	Traditional	
Cleopatra in Space	Action Adventure Comic science fiction	3 seasons, 26 episodes	N/A	April 15, 2020 – June 25, 2021	Peacock	DreamWorks Animation Television	TV-Y7	Flash	
Looney Tunes Cartoons	Comedy Slapstick	6 seasons, 82 episodes	Peter Browngardt	May 27, 2020 – June 13, 2024	HBO Max	Warner Bros. Animation	TV-Y7	Traditional/Flash (Some Segments)	
Rhyme Time Town	Educational	2 seasons, 21 episodes	Dan Berlinka	June 19, 2020 – June 15, 2021	Netflix	DreamWorks Animation Television	TV-Y	Flash/Traditional	
Adventure Time: Distant Lands	Miniseries Science fantasy	1 season, 4 episodes	Pendleton Ward	June 25, 2020 – September 2, 2021	HBO Max	Cartoon Network Studios Frederator Studios	TV-PG	Traditional	
Deer Squad	Preschool Adventure	4 seasons, 80 episodes	N/A	July 15, 2020 – present	iQIYI Nickelodeon	Beijing iQIYI Science & Technology Co., Ltd.	TV-PG	CGI	
Tig n' Seek	Comedy Adventure	4 seasons, 80 episodes	Myke Chilian	July 23, 2020 – May 26, 2022	HBO Max	Cartoon Network Studios	TV-PG	Traditional	
Wizards: Tales of Arcadia	Science fantasy	1 part, 10 episodes	Guillermo del Toro	August 7, 2020	Netflix	DreamWorks Animation Television	TV-Y7	CGI	
The Fungies!	Comedy Adventure Fantasy	3 seasons, 80 episodes	Stephen P. Neary	August 20, 2020 – December 16, 2021	HBO Max	Cartoon Network Studios	TV-Y7	Traditional	
Madagascar: A Little Wild	Comedy Adventure Educational	8 seasons, 50 episodes	Dana Starfield	September 7, 2020 – June 30, 2022	Hulu Peacock	Mainframe Studios DreamWorks Animation Television	TV-Y	CGI	
Jurassic World Camp Cretaceous	Action Adventure Science fiction	5 seasons, 50 episodes	Zack Stentz	September 18, 2020 – November 15, 2022	Netflix	Universal Pictures DreamWorks Animation Television Amblin Entertainment	TV-PG	CGI	
Santiago of the Seas	Action Adventure Educational	2 seasons, 46 episodes	Niki Lopez Leslie Valdes Valerie Walsh Valdes	October 9, 2020 – July 27, 2023	Nickelodeon (2020–23) Nick Jr. (2023)	Nickelodeon Animation Studio Walsh Valdés Productions (season 1)	TV-Y	CGI	
The Mighty Ones	Fantasy Comedy	4 seasons, 40 episodes	Sunil Hall Lynne Naylor	November 9, 2020 – December 9, 2022	Hulu Peacock	DreamWorks Animation Television Peacock	TV-Y7	Flash	
Trash Truck	Educational Preschool	2 seasons, 28 episodes	Max Keane	November 10, 2020 – May 4, 2021	Netflix	Glen Keane Productions Netflix Animation Studios	TV-Y	CGI	
Doug Unplugs	Adventure	2 seasons, 26 episodes	Jim Nolan	November 13, 2020 – April 1, 2022	Apple TV+	DreamWorks Animation Television	TV-Y	CGI	
The Wonderful World of Mickey Mouse	Comedy	1 seasons, 20 episodes	Paul Rudish	November 18, 2020 – July 28, 2023	Disney+	Disney Television Animation	TV-G	Flash/Traditional	
Trolls: TrollsTopia	Comedy Fantasy Musical	7 seasons, 52 episodes	Matthew Beans Hannah Friedman Sam Friedman	November 19, 2020 – August 11, 2022	Hulu Peacock	DreamWorks Animation Television Atomic Cartoons	TV-Y7	Flash	
Animaniacs (2020)	Comedy Musical Satire Slapstick	3 seasons, 36 episodes	Wellesley Wild Steven Spielberg	November 20, 2020 – February 17, 2023	Hulu	Warner Bros. Animation Amblin Television	TV-PG	Traditional/Flash	
Kinderwood	Mystery Adventure	1 season, 30 episodes	Otto Tang Carin Greenberg	December 3, 2020 – April 6, 2021	Noggin	Titmouse, Inc.	TV-Y	Flash	
Stillwater	Comedy	5 seasons, 35 episodes	Jun Falkenstein	December 4, 2020 – August 21, 2026	Apple TV+	Gaumont Animation Scholastic Entertainment	TV-Y7	CGI	
Baby Shark's Big Show!	Children's television series	3 seasons, 91 episodes	Whitney Ralls Gary "Doodles" DiRaffaele Tommy Sica	December 11, 2020 – January 14, 2025	Nickelodeon	The Pinkfong Company Nickelodeon Animation Studio	TV-Y	Traditional/Flash	
Gabby's Dollhouse	Variety Educational	14 seasons, 90 episodes	Traci Paige Johnson Jennifer Twomey	January 5, 2021 – present	Netflix	DreamWorks Animation Television	TV-Y	CGI/Live-action	
Kid Cosmic	Comic science fiction Superhero	3 seasons, 24 episodes	Craig McCracken	February 2, 2021 – February 3, 2022	Netflix	A CMCC Production Netflix Animation Studios	TV-Y7	Flash/Traditional	
Tom and Jerry Special Shorts	Comedy	1 season, 2 episodes	Peter Browngardt	February 20, 2021	HBO Max	Turner Entertainment Warner Bros. Animation	TV-PG	Traditional/Flash	
Kamp Koral: SpongeBob's Under Years	Comedy	2 seasons, 39 episodes	Stephen Hillenburg	March 4, 2021 – July 10, 2024	Paramount+	United Plankton Pictures, Inc. Nickelodeon Animation Studios	TV-Y7	CGI	
Stan Lee's Superhero Kindergarten	Superhero	1 season, 26 episodes	Fabian Nicieza	April 23 – October 22, 2021	Kartoon Channel	Genius Brands POW! Entertainment Oak Productions Telegael	TV-Y7	Flash	
Star Wars: The Bad Batch	Action-Adventure Science fiction	3 seasons, 47 episodes	Dave Filoni Jennifer Corbett	May 4, 2021 – May 1, 2024	Disney+	Lucasfilm Lucasfilm Animation	TV-PG	CGI	
The Chicken Squad	Comedy Adventure	1 season, 29 episodes	Tom Rogers	May 14, 2021 – April 22, 2022	Disney Junior	Wild Canary Animation	TV-Y	CGI	
Rugrats (2021)	Comedy Adventure Slice of life	3 seasons, 64 episodes	Arlene Klasky Gábor Csupó Paul Germain	May 27, 2021 – June 14, 2026	Paramount+ Nicktoons	Klasky Csupo Nickelodeon Animation Studio	TV-Y7	CGI	
Tuttle Twins	Adventure	3 seasons, 34 episodes	Daniel Harmon	June 30, 2021 – present		Angel Studios Harmon Brothers	TV-G	Toon Boom	
Tom and Jerry in New York	Comedy	2 seasons, 13 episodes	Darrell Van Citters	July 1 - November 18, 2021	HBO Max	Turner Entertainment Warner Bros. Animation	TV-PG	Flash	
Monsters at Work	Comedy Fantasy	2 seasons, 20 episodes	Bobs Gannaway	July 7, 2021 – May 4, 2024	Disney+ (season 1) Disney Channel (season 2)	Disney Television Animation	TV-G	CGI	
Middlemost Post	Comedy	2 seasons, 33 episodes	John Trabbic III	July 9, 2021 – October 21, 2022	Nickelodeon	Nickelodeon Animation Studio	TV-Y7	Flash	
The Patrick Star Show	Comedy Slapstick	5 seasons, 79 episodes	Luke Brookshier Marc Ceccarelli Andrew Goodman Kaz Mr. Lawrence Vincent Waller	July 9, 2021 – present	Nickelodeon	United Plankton Pictures, Inc. Nickelodeon Animation Studios	TV-Y7	Traditional	
Ridley Jones	Educational Musical Adventure	4 seasons, 20 episodes	Chris Nee	July 13, 2021 – March 6, 2023	Netflix	Netflix Animation Studios Brown Bag Films	TV-Y	CGI	
Johnny Test (2021)	Science fantasy Action Adventure Comedy	2 seasons, 40 episodes	Scott Fellows	July 16, 2021 – January 7, 2022	Netflix	WildBrain Studios	TV-Y7	Flash/Toon Boom	
Jellystone!	Comedy Slapstick	3 seasons, 77 episodes	C. H. Greenblatt	July 29, 2021 – March 6, 2025	HBO Max	Warner Bros. Animation	TV-G	Flash	
Centaurworld	Musical Comedy drama	2 seasons, 18 episodes	Megan Nicole Dong	July 30 – December 7, 2021	Netflix	Netflix Animation Studios Sketchshark Productions	TV-Y7	Flash/Traditional	
Spidey and His Amazing Friends	Superhero	5 seasons, 113 episodes	Darren Bachynski	August 6, 2021 – present	Disney Jr.	Marvel Animation (season 1) Marvel Studios Animation (season 2–present)	TV-Y7	CGI	
Mickey Mouse Funhouse	Educational	3 seasons, 86 episodes	Phil Weinstein Thomas Hart	August 20, 2021 – April 25, 2025	Disney Jr.	Disney Television Animation	TV-Y	CGI	
I Heart Arlo	Musical	1 season, 19 episodes	Ryan Crego	August 27, 2021	Netflix	Titmouse, Inc. Netflix Animation Studios Creegs, Inc.	TV-Y7	Flash	
Dug Days	Comedy	1 season, 6 episodes	Bob Peterson	September 1, 2021 – June 16, 2023	Disney+	Pixar Animation Studios	TV-PG	CGI	
Sharkdog	Comedy	3 seasons, 22 episodes	Jacinth Tan Yi Ting	September 3, 2021 – April 27, 2023	Netflix	One Animation Nickelodeon Productions	TV-Y	CGI	
The Smurfs (2021)	Adventure Fantasy Slapstick	3 seasons, 156 episodes	Pierre "Peyo" Culliford	September 10, 2021 – present	La Trois TF1 Ketnet KiKA	Dupuis Edition & Audiovisuel Peyo Productions IMPS Brussels Dargaud Media Les Cartooneurs Associés Ellipsanime Productions	TV-Y7	CGI	
Little Ellen	Comedy	4 seasons, 40 episodes	Kevin A. Leman II Jennifer Skelly	September 13, 2021 – March 3, 2022	HBO Max	Warner Bros. Animation Ellen Digital Ventures (uncredited)	TV-Y	Flash/Traditional	
Mush-Mush & the Mushables	Comedy	1 season, 50 episodes	Elfriede de Rooster	September 13, 2021 – present	Cartoonito	Cake Entertainment La Cabane Productions Thuristar	TV-Y	CGI	
He-Man and the Masters of the Universe (2021)	Action-adventure Science fantasy	3 seasons, 26 episodes	Rob David	September 16, 2021 – August 18, 2022	Netflix	House of Cool CGCG Inc. Mattel Television	TV-Y7	CGI	
Do, Re & Mi	Musical	1 season, 26 episodes	Fabien Ouvrard	September 17, 2021 – July 29, 2022	Amazon Prime Video	Michael Made Me Gaumont Animation Amazon Studios	TV-Y	CGI	
Lucas the Spider	Comedy	1 season, 77 episodes	Joshua Slice	September 18, 2021 – December 1, 2023	Cartoonito Family Channel	Cake Entertainment Wexworks Media Fresh TV Inc.	TV-Y	CGI	
The Croods: Family Tree	Comedy Adventure	8 seasons, 52 episodes	N/A	September 23, 2021 – November 9, 2023	Hulu Peacock	DreamWorks Animation Television	TV-G	CGI	
Ada Twist, Scientist	Educational	4 seasons, 41 episodes	Kerri Grant	September 28, 2021 – April 22, 2023	Netflix	Laughing Wild Brown Bag Films Higher Ground Productions Wonder Worldwide Netflix Animation Studios	TV-Y	CGI	
Yabba-Dabba Dinosaurs	Comedy	2 seasons, 26 episodes	Mark Marek; Marly Halpern-Graser	September 30, 2021 – February 17, 2022	HBO Max	Warner Bros. Animation	TV-Y7	Flash	
The Ghost and Molly McGee	Supernatural fantasy Musical Buddy comedy	2 seasons, 41 episodes	Bill Motz Bob Roth	October 1, 2021 – January 13, 2024	Disney Channel	Disney Television Animation	TV-Y7	Flash/Toon Boom	
Alma's Way	Educational	3 seasons, 67 episodes	Sonia Manzano	October 4, 2021 – present	PBS Kids	Fred Rogers Productions Pipeline Studios	TV-Y	Flash/Traditional	
Ghostforce	Superhero Action-Comedy Adventure	2 seasons, 52 episodes	Jeremy Zag	October 4, 2021 – present	TFOU EBS 1 (season 1) Disney Channel (season 1) Netflix (season 2)	Method Animation SAMG Animation Zagtoon Kidsme S.R.L	TV-Y	CGI	
A Tale Dark & Grimm	Fantasy Action Adventure	1 season, 10 episodes	Doug Langdale Simon Otto	October 8, 2021	Netflix	Boat Rocker Studios Novo Media Group Astro-Nomical Entertainment Netflix Animation Studios	TV-Y7	CGI	
Get Rolling with Otis	Adventure	2 seasons, 18 episodes	Declan Doyle	October 8, 2021 – September 30, 2022	Apple TV+	9 Story Media Group Brown Bag Films	TV-Y	CGI	
Aquaman: King of Atlantis	Miniseries Action-adventure Comedy Science fiction Superhero	1 season, 3 episodes	Victor Courtright Marly Halpern-Graser	October 14, 2021 – October 28, 2021	HBO Max	Warner Bros. Animation DC Entertainment Atomic Monster	TV-PG	Traditional	
Karma's World	Comedy Musical	4 seasons, 40 episodes	Chris Bridges	October 15, 2021 – September 22, 2022	Netflix	Karma's World Entertainment Netflix Animation Studios Brown Bag Films 9 Story Media Group	TV-Y	CGI	
Maya and the Three	Miniseries Fantasy Adventure Action	1 season, 9 episodes	Jorge Gutierrez	October 22, 2021	Netflix	Netflix Animation Studios Mexopolis	TV-Y7	CGI	
Star Trek: Prodigy	Science fiction	2 seasons, 40 episodes	Kevin Hageman Dan Hageman	October 28, 2021 – July 1, 2024	Paramount+ (season 1) Netflix (season 2)	Nickelodeon Animation Studio CBS Eye Animation Productions Secret Hideout Roddenberry Entertainment Brothers Hageman Productions	TV-Y7	CGI	
Dogs in Space	Adventure Action	2 seasons, 20 episodes	Jeremiah Cortez	November 18, 2021 – September 15, 2022	Netflix	Atomic Cartoons Netflix Animation Studios GrizzlyJerr Productions	TV-Y7	Flash	
Harriet the Spy	Comedy	1 season, 10 episodes	Will McRobb	November 19, 2021 – May 5, 2023	Apple TV+	Apple Studios Postworks New York The Jim Henson Company Rehab Entertainment 2 Friends Entertainment Titmouse, Inc.	TV-G	Flash	
Dragons: The Nine Realms	Action Comedy	8 seasons, 52 episodes	John Tellegen	December 23, 2021 – December 14, 2023	Hulu Peacock	DreamWorks Animation Television	TV-G	CGI	
We Baby Bears	Comedy Fantasy Adventure	2 seasons, 63 episodes	Manny Hernandez	January 1, 2022 – present	Cartoon Network	Cartoon Network Studios	TV-Y7	Traditional	
Action Pack	Preschool Action	2 seasons, 16 episodes	William Harper	January 4 – June 6, 2022	Netflix	OddBot Animation	TV-Y	CGI	
El Deafo	Adventure	1 season, 3 episodes	Will McRobb	January 7, 2022	Apple TV+	Lighthouse Studios Waxahatchee	TV-G	Flash/Traditional/Toon Boom	
Alice's Wonderland Bakery	Comedy	2 seasons, 50 episodes	Chelsea Beyl	February 9, 2022 – April 15, 2024	Disney Junior	Disney Television Animation	TV-Y	CGI	
Pretzel and the Puppies	Comedy	2 seasons, 18 episodes	Steve Altiere Kim Howitt	February 11, 2022 – February 24, 2023	Apple TV+	HarperCollins Productions House of Cool Saturday Animation Studio	TV-Y	CGI	
Big Nate	Comedy	2 seasons, 52 episodes	Mitch Watson	February 17, 2022 – August 26, 2024	Paramount+	Nickelodeon Animation Studio John Cohen Productions	TV-Y7	CGI	
The Cuphead Show!	Comedy Adventure Slapstick	3 seasons, 36 episodes	Chad Moldenhauer Jared Moldenhauer CJ Kettler Dave Wasson Cosmo Segurson	February 18 – November 18, 2022	Netflix	King Features Syndicate Studio MDHR Netflix Animation	TV-Y7	Flash/Traditional	
Team Zenko Go	Action	2 seasons, 22 episodes	Jack Thomas	March 15 – August 8, 2022	Netflix	DreamWorks Animation Television Mainframe Studios	TV-Y	CGI	
Transformers: BotBots	Action Adventure Science fiction Comedy	1 season, 10 episodes	Comedy	March 25, 2022	Netflix	Hasbro Entertainment One Boulder Media	TV-Y	Flash	
My Little Pony: Tell Your Tale	Comedy	2 seasons, 93 episodes	N/A	April 7, 2022 – October 17, 2024	YouTube	Entertainment One Lil Critter Workshop	TV-Y	Flash	
Pinecone & Pony	Adventure	2 seasons, 16 episodes	Stephanie Kaliner	April 8, 2022 – February 3, 2023	Apple TV+	DreamWorks Animation Television First Generation Films Atomic Cartoons	TV-Y	Flash	
The Creature Cases	Preschool Action Comedy	7 chapters, 59 episodes	Gabe Pulliam	April 12, 2022 – present	Netflix Tencent Video	Sony Pictures Television Kids TeamTO Tencent Video Productions	TV-Y	CGI	
Battle Kitty	Action Comedy	1 season, 9 episodes	Matt Layzell Paul Layzell	April 19, 2022	Netflix	Netflix Animation Studios Layzell Bros.	TV-Y7	CGI	
Samurai Rabbit: The Usagi Chronicles	Action Adventure	2 seasons, 20 episodes	Doug Langdale Candie Langdale	April 28 – September 1, 2022	Netflix	Netflix Animation Studios Gaumont Animation Atomic Monster Dark Horse Entertainment	TV-Y7	CGI	
Mecha Builders	Science fiction Educational	1 season, 26 episodes	Yurie Rocha	April 30, 2022 – November 24, 2023	Cartoonito HBO Max	Sesame Workshop	TV-Y	CGI	
The Boss Baby: Back in the Crib	Comedy	2 seasons, 28 episodes	Brandon Sawyer	May 19, 2022 – April 13, 2023	Netflix	DreamWorks Animation Television	TV-Y7	CGI	
My Little Pony: Make Your Mark	Fantasy Musical	6 chapters, 27 episodes	Gillian Berrow	May 26, 2022 – November 23, 2023	Netflix	Entertainment One Boulder Media	TV-Y	CGI	
Face's Music Party	Live-action animated Musical	1 season, 16 episodes	N/A	June 3, 2022 – December 11, 2023	Nickelodeon	Jonas & Co. Nickelodeon Animation Studio	TV-Y	Flash/Traditional/Live-action	
Dead End: Paranormal Park	Dark fantasy Horror comedy Supernatural	2 seasons, 20 episodes	Hamish Steele	June 16 – October 13, 2022	Netflix	Blink Industries Netflix Animation Studios	TV-Y7	Flash/Traditional	
Eureka!	Educational	1 season, 30 episodes	Norton Virgien Niamh Sharkey	June 22, 2022 – March 24, 2023	Disney Junior	Brown Bag Films	TV-Y	CGI	
Best & Bester	Comedy	1 season, 27 episodes	Anttu Harlin Joonas Utti	June 27, 2022 – January 29, 2023	YTV	Nelvana Eye Present Gigglebug Entertainment	TV-Y7	Flash/Toon Boom Harmony	
Me & Mickey	Educational	5 seasons, 120 episodes	N/A	June 27, 2022 – present	Disney Junior	Walt Disney Animation Studios	TV-Y	CGI	
Baymax!	Comedy Superhero Science fiction	1 season, 6 episodes	Don Hall	June 29, 2022	Disney+	Walt Disney Animation Studios	TV-PG	CGI	
Duck & Goose	Educational	2 seasons, 17 episodes	Brian Muelhaupt Jane Startz	July 8, 2022 – July 7, 2023	Apple TV+	Titmouse Inc.	TV-Y	Flash	
Kung Fu Panda: The Dragon Knight	Action Comedy	3 seasons, 42 episodes	Mitch Watson Peter Hastings	July 14, 2022 – September 7, 2023	Netflix	DreamWorks Animation Television	TV-Y7	CGI	
Bugs Bunny Builders	Comedy Educational	2 seasons, 80 episodes	Joey Adams Andy Thom Abe Audish Lindsey Pollard	July 25, 2022 – December 8, 2025	Cartoonito HBO Max	Warner Bros. Animation	TV-Y	Flash/Traditional	
Chibiverse	Comedy Crossover	3 seasons, 11 episodes	Gino Guzzardo	July 30, 2022 – present	Disney Channel	Disney Television Animation	TV-Y7	Traditional/Flash	
Super Giant Robot Brothers	Action Adventure Comedy	1 season, 10 episodes	Victor Maldonado Alfredo Torres	August 4, 2022	Netflix	Netflix Animation Studios Reel FX Creative Studios Assemblage Entertainment	TV-Y7-FV	CGI	
Hamster & Gretel	Action Comedy Superhero	2 seasons, 50 episodes	Dan Povenmire	August 12, 2022 – April 13, 2025	Disney Channel	Disney Television Animation	TV-Y7	Traditional/Flash/Toon Boom Harmony	
Deepa & Anoop	Adventure Preschool Family	2 seasons, 18 episodes	Munjal Shroff Lisa Goldman Heather Kenyon	August 15 – November 7, 2022	Netflix	Mattel Television Kickstart Entertainment	TV-Y	CGI	
Jade Armor	Action	2 seasons, 26 episodes	Corinne Kouper Mary Bredin M.J. Offen	September 7, 2022 – present	Cartoon Network France 4 Super RTL	TeamTO	TV-Y7-FV	CGI	
Cars on the Road	Comedy	1 season, 8 episodes	Steve Purcell	September 8, 2022	Disney+	Pixar Animation Studios	TV-G	CGI	
The Tiny Chef Show	Comedy	3 seasons, 31 episodes	Rachel Larsen	September 9, 2022 – March 6, 2025	Nickelodeon	Imagine Kids+Family Tiny Chef Productions Dunshire Productions Factory ShadowMachine Nickelodeon Animation Studio	TV-Y	Stop-Motion Live-Action	
Sago Mini Friends	Educational	3 seasons, 24 episodes	Chad Hicks	September 16, 2022 – November 22, 2024	Apple TV+	Spin Master Entertainment Brown Bag Films	TV-Y	Flash	
Batwheels	Preschool Superhero	3 seasons, 102 episodes	Steven Fink	September 17, 2022 – present	Cartoonito HBO Max	Warner Bros. Animation DC Entertainment	TV-Y	CGI	
Firebuds	Educational	3 seasons, 60 episodes	Craig Gerber	September 21, 2022 – December 4, 2025	Disney Jr.	Disney Television Animation Electric Emu Productions	TV-Y	CGI	
Abominable and the Invisible City	Adventure Comedy Fantasy	2 season, 20 episodes	Jim Schumann	October 5, 2022 – March 29, 2023	Peacock Hulu	DreamWorks Animation Television	TV-Y7	CGI	
Monster High	Horror-comedy	2 seasons, 50 episodes	N/A	October 6, 2022 – October 24, 2024	Nickelodeon	Mattel Television Nickelodeon Animation Studio	TV-Y7	CGI	
Oddballs	Comedy	2 seasons, 20 episodes	James Rallison Ethan Banville	October 7, 2022 – February 24, 2023	Netflix	Netflix Animation Studios Atomic Cartoons	TV-Y7	Flash	
Spirit Rangers	Educational Preschool	3 seasons, 39 episodes	Karissa Valencia	October 10, 2022 – April 8, 2024	Netflix	Netflix Animation Studios Laughing Wild Superprod Studio	TV-Y	CGI	
Interstellar Ella	Space opera	1 season, 31 episodes	Adam Long	October 17, 2022 – present	Ketnet	Aardman Fabrique Fantastique Apartment 11 Productions	TV-Y	CGI	
Oni: Thunder God's Tale	Adventure Drama Fantasy	1 season, 4 episodes	Daisuke Tsutsumi	October 21, 2022	Netflix	Tonko House Netflix Animation Studios	TV-Y7	CGI Stop motion	
Daniel Spellbound	Adventure Fantasy	2 season, 20 episodes	Matt Fernandes	October 27, 2022 – January 26, 2023	Netflix	Netflix Animation Studios Industrial Brothers	TV-Y7	CGI	
Zootopia+	Comedy Anthology	1 season, 6 episodes	Trent Correy Josie Trinidad	November 9, 2022	Disney+	Walt Disney Animation Studios	TV-PG	CGI	
Transformers: EarthSpark	Action Science fiction Comedy	3 seasons, 44 episodes	Dale Malinowski Ant Ward Nicole Dubuc	November 11, 2022 – December 5, 2025	Paramount+	Entertainment One Nickelodeon Animation Studio	TV-Y7	CGI	
Interrupting Chicken	Educational	2 seasons, 17 episodes	N/A	November 18, 2022 – September 29, 2023	Apple TV+	Mercury Filmworks	TV-Y	Flash	
StoryBots: Answer Time	Educational	2 seasons, 22 episodes	Evan Spiridellis Gregg Spiridellis	November 21, 2022 – July 10, 2023	Netflix	Brown Bag Films	TV-Y	Flash/Traditional/Live Action	
Sonic Prime	Action Comedy Dystopia Science fiction	2 seasons, 23 episodes	Joe Kacey Joe Kelly Duncan Rouleau Stephen C. Seagal	December 15, 2022 – January 11, 2024	Netflix	Sega of America WildBrain Studios Man of Action Entertainment Netflix Animation Studios	TV-Y7	CGI	
SuperKitties	Superhero	3 seasons, 74 episodes	Paula Rosenthal	January 11, 2023 – present	Disney Jr.	Sony Pictures Television Kids	TV-Y	CGI	
Shape Island	Comedy Fantasy	2 seasons, 18 episodes	Mac Barnett Jon Klassen	January 20, 2023 – present	Apple TV+	Bix Pix Entertainment		Stop-Motion	
Princess Power	Adventure	3 seasons, 45 episodes	Elise Allen	January 30, – December 1, 2023	Netflix	Atomic Cartoons Flower Films	TV-Y	CGI	
Rubble & Crew		6 seasons, 89 episodes	Bradley Zweig	February 3, 2023 – present	Treehouse TV	Spin Master Entertainment	TV-Y	CGI	
My Dad the Bounty Hunter	Action	2 season, 19 episodes	Evrett Downing Jr. Patrick Harpin	February 9 – August 17, 2023	Netflix	Dwarf Animation Studio Netflix Animation Studios	TV-Y7	CGI	
Moon Girl and Devil Dinosaur	Superhero Adventure	2 seasons, 41 episodes	Laurence Fishburne Helen Sugland	February 10, 2023 – March 8, 2025	Disney Channel	Disney Television Animation Marvel Animation Titmouse, Inc. Cinema Gypsy Productions	TV-Y7-FV	Flash/Traditional	
Bossy Bear	Educational	1 season, 30 episodes	David Horvath Sun-Min Kim	March 6, 2023 – February 29, 2024	Nickelodeon	Imagine Kids+Family Nickelodeon Animation Studio Renegade Animation	TV-Y	Flash	
Kiff	Comedy	3 seasons, 61 episodes	Lucy Heavens Nic Smal Kent Osborne	March 10, 2023 – present	Disney Channel	Disney Television Animation Titmouse, Inc.	TV-Y7	Traditional	
Lu & the Bally Bunch	Comedy Preschool Musical	1 season, 76 episodes	Nicky Phelan	March 17 – September 4, 2023	Cartoonito Max	9 Story Media Group Brown Bag Films Bhean Productions Limited	TV-Y	Flash/Traditional	
Kiya & the Kimoja Heroes	Comedy	1 season, 26 episodes	Peter Ramsey	March 22, 2023 – February 9, 2024	Disney Junior France 4	Triggerfish Animation Studios Entertainment One Frog Box Productions TeamTO Disney Branded Television	TV-Y	CGI	
Eva the Owlet	Adventure	2 seasons, 17 episodes	TBA	March 31, 2023 – January 24, 2025	Apple TV+	Scholastic Entertainment Brown Bag Films	TV-Y	CGI	
Frog and Toad	Fantasy	2 seasons, 17 episodes	Rob Hoegee	April 28, 2023 – May 31, 2024	Apple TV+	Titmouse, Inc.	TV-Y	Flash	
Star Wars: Young Jedi Adventures	Space opera	3 seasons, 55 episodes	N/A	May 4, 2023 – December 8, 2025	Disney+ Disney Jr.	Lucasfilm Animation	TV-Y	CGI	
Kitti Katz	Action	1 season, 10 episodes	N/A	May 18, 2023	Netflix	Kidscave Studios		CGI	
Gremlins: Secrets of the Mogwai	Fantasy	2 seasons, 20 episodes	N/A	May 23, 2023 – April 10, 2025	Max	Warner Bros. Animation Amblin Television	TV-Y7	CGI	
Dino Pops	Science-fiction	1 season, 6 episodes	Ailing Zubizarreta	May 25, 2023 – present	Peacock	Mobius Lab Kids	TV-Y	CGI	
Hailey's On It!	Comedy	1 season, 30 episodes	Devin Bunje Nick Stanton	June 8, 2023 – May 18, 2024	Disney Channel	Disney Television Animation	TV-Y7	Traditional	
Pupstruction	Preschool	3 seasons, 74 episodes	Travis Braun	June 14, 2023 – present	Disney Jr.	Titmouse, Inc.	TV-Y	CGI	
Not Quite Narwhal	Preschool	2 seasons, 39 episodes	Jessie Sima	June 19, 2023 – January 22, 2024	Netflix	DreamWorks Animation Television	TV-Y	CGI	
Silly Sundays		1 season, 76 episodes	Nuria González Blanco	July 2, 2023 – present	Cartoonito	Cartoon Saloon	TV-Y	Flash/Traditional	
Kizazi Moto: Generation Fire	Anthology	1 season, 10 episodes	Peter Ramsey	July 5, 2023	Disney+	Triggerfish Animation Studios		CGI/Traditional	
Supa Team 4	Action	2 seasons, 16 episodes	Malenga Mulendema	July 20 – December 21, 2023	Netflix	Triggerfish Animation Studios Superprod Studio Cake Entertainment		CGI	
Dew Drop Diaries	Fantasy	2 seasons, 40 episodes	Rick Suvalle	July 24 – December 4, 2023	Netflix	DreamWorks Animation Television	TV-Y	CGI	
Mech Cadets	Action	1 season, 10 episodes	N/A	August 10, 2023	Netflix	Netflix Animation Studios Boom! Studios Polygon Pictures	TV-Y7	CGI	
Tiny Toons Looniversity	Slapstick Comedy	2 seasons, 23 episodes	N/A	September 8, 2023 – March 22, 2025	Cartoon Network Max	Amblin Television Warner Bros. Animation	TV-Y7	Traditional/Flash	
Little Baby Bum: Music Time	Preschool; Musical	1 season, 9 episodes	TBA	September 25, 2023	Netflix	Moonbug Entertainment	TV-Y	CGI	
Fright Krewe	Horror	2 seasons, 20 episodes	Eli Roth James Frey	October 2, 2023 – March 29, 2024	Hulu Peacock	DreamWorks Animation Television	TV-Y7	Traditional/Flash	
Jessica's Big Little World	Comedy	1 season, 20 episodes	Matt Burnett Ben Levin Tiffany Ford	October 2, 2023 – May 31, 2024	Cartoon Network Max	Cartoon Network Studios	TV-Y	Traditional	
Chip Chilla	Preschool Comedy	2 seasons, 23 episodes	Eric Branscum Ethan Nicolle	October 16, 2023 – June 8, 2024	Bentkey	Matchbox Hero	TV-Y	Flash	
Superbuns	Superhero	1 season, 39 episodes	TBA	October 12, 2023 – April 18, 2024	Peacock	Yowza! Animation	TV-Y	Flash	
Li'l Stompers	Comedy	1 season, 65 episodes	Phillip Stamp	October 26, 2023 – February 29, 2024	Peacock	IoM		CGI	
Curses!	Adventure	2 seasons, 20 episodes	Jeff Dixon Jim Cooper	October 27, 2023 – October 4, 2024	Apple TV+	DreamWorks Animation Television	TV-Y7	CGI	
Unicorn Academy	Adventure Action Fantasy	5 chapters, 29 episodes	Michelle Lamoreaux	November 2, 2023 – present	Netflix	Spin Master Entertainment	TV-Y7	CGI	
The Heroic Quest of the Valiant Prince Ivandoe	Adventure	1 season, 40 episodes	Eva Lee Wallberg Christian Bøving-Andersen	November 11, 2023 – January 16, 2024	Cartoon Network	Hanna-Barbera Studios Europe	TV-Y7	Flash	
Isadora Moon	Educational	1 season, 9 episodes	TBA	November 17, 2023 – present	Sky Kids	Kelebek Media, Jam Studios	TV-Y	Flash	
Galapagos X		1 season, 26 episodes	TBA	November 21, 2023 – present	TVOKids	Big Bad Boo Studios	TV-Y7	Flash	
Dee & Friends in Oz	Adventure	2 parts, 17 episodes	Angela C. Santomero	February 5, 2024	Netflix	9 Story Media Group Brown Bag Films	TV-Y	CGI	
Lyla in the Loop	Educational Comedy	1 season, 40 episodes	Dave Peth	February 5, 2024 – present	PBS Kids	Mighty Picnic Pipeline Studios Jam Filled Entertainment	TV-Y7	Flash	
Rock, Paper, Scissors	Comedy	3 seasons, 40 episodes	Kyle Stegina Josh Lehrman	February 11, 2024 – October 12, 2026	Nickelodeon	Nickelodeon Animation Studio	TV-Y7	Flash/Toon Boom	
MechWest	Steampunk Western	1 season, 4 episodes	Dave Gallagher	February 14, 2024 – present	YouTube	AnimSchool Studios	TV-G	CGI	
Bea's Block	Comedy	1 season, 20 episodes	TBA	February 15, 2024	Sky Kids HBO Max	Sesame Workshop	TV-Y	CGI	
Iwájú	Science fiction Drama	1 season, 6 episodes	N/A	February 28, 2024	Disney+	Cinesite Walt Disney Animation Studios Kugali Media	TV-Y7	CGI	
Megamind Rules!	Superhero Comedy	1 season, 16 episodes	N/A	March 1 – June 20, 2024	Peacock	DreamWorks Animation Television	TV-Y7	CGI	
Hot Wheels Let's Race	Adventure	3 seasons, 20 episodes	Rob David	March 4, 2024 – March 3, 2025	Netflix	Mattel Television Sprite Animation Studios OLM Digital	TV-Y7	CGI	
Mia & Codie		2 seasons, 40 episodes	TBA	March 12, 2024 – present	TVOKids	Epic Story Media	TV-Y	CGI	
Morphle and the Magic Pets	Comedy Fantasy	1 season, 52 episodes	Jill Sanford and Mark Palmer; Arthur van Merwijk (characters)	March 20, 2024 – March 17, 2025	Disney+ Disney Jr.	Moonbug Entertainment Guru Studio	TV-Y	CGI	
Dylan's Playtime Adventures		1 season, 52 episodes	TBA	April 1, 2024	Cartoonito	9 Story Media Group Brown Bag Films	TV-Y	CGI/Traditional	
Hop		1 season, 26 episodes	Marc Brown	April 4, 2024–present	Max	Epic Story Media Loomi Animation	TV-Y	Flash	
The Fairly OddParents: A New Wish	Adventure	1 season, 20 episodes	Butch Hartman	May 20 – August 8, 2024	Nickelodeon Netflix	Billionfold Inc. Nickelodeon Animation Studio	TV-Y7	CGI	
Angry Birds Mystery Island	Mystery Comedy	1 season, 24 episodes	Eric Rogers	May 21 – December 3, 2024	Amazon Prime Video Amazon Kids+	Titmouse, Inc. Rovio Animation	TV-G	Flash	
Jurassic World: Chaos Theory	Comedy Adventure	4 seasons, 39 episodes	N/A	May 24, 2024 – November 20, 2025	Netflix	DreamWorks Animation Television	TV-Y7	CGI	
Camp Snoopy	Comedy	2 seasons, 26 episodes	TBA	June 14, 2024 – present	Apple TV+	WildBrain Studios Peanuts Worldwide Schulz Studio	TV-G	Flash/Traditional	
Audrey's Shelter		1 season, 52 episodes	TBA	June 17, 2024 – present	TVOKids	Image In Atlantique Watch Next Media	TV-Y7	Flash	
Ariel	Adventure	2 seasons, 56 episodes	N/A	June 27, 2024 – present	Disney Jr.	Wild Canary Animation	TV-Y	CGI	
WondLa	Fantasy	3 seasons, 20 episodes	N/A	June 28, 2024 – November 26, 2025	Apple TV+	Skydance Animation Gotham Group	TV-PG	CGI	
Zombies: The Re-Animated Series	Musical	1 season, 20 episodes	Aliki Theofilopoulos Jack Ferraiolo	June 28 – December 7, 2024	Disney Channel	Disney Television Animation	TV-G	CGI	
Primos	Comedy	1 season, 28 episodes	Natasha Kline	July 25, 2024 – April 27, 2025	Disney Channel	Disney Television Animation	TV-Y7	Traditional	
Tales of the Teenage Mutant Ninja Turtles	Superhero	2 season, 24 episodes	Christopher Yost	August 9, 2024 – December 12, 2025	Paramount+	Point Grey Pictures Nickelodeon Animation Studio	TV-Y7	Flash/Traditional	
Kindergarten: The Musical	Musical	1 season, 25 episodes	Michelle Lewis Charlton Pettus	September 3, 2024 – May 23, 2025	Disney Jr.	Oddbot Entertainment	TV-Y	CGI Flash	
Tea Town Teddy Bears	Family comedy	1 season, 26 episodes	TBA	September 26 – December 19, 2024	Peacock	M2 Animation	TV-Y	CGI	
Barney's World	Preschool	1 season, 52 episodes	N/A	October 14, 2024 – November 8, 2025	HBO Max	Mattel Television Nelvana	TV-Y	CGI	
Mighty MonsterWheelies	Preschool	2 seasons, 52 episodes	Kyel White	October 14, 2024 – May 5, 2025	Netflix	DreamWorks Animation Television Universal Television	TV-Y	CGI	
Hamsters of Hamsterdale		1 season, 26 episodes	TBA	October 16, 2024	Nickelodeon	Nelvana	TV-Y	Flash	
Max & the Midknights	Adventure	4 seasons, 40 episodes	N/A	October 30, 2024 – October 23, 2026	Nickelodeon (season 1) Nicktoons (season 2) TeenNick (season 2)	Jane Startz Productions Nickelodeon Animation Studio	TV-Y7	CGI	
Carl the Collector		1 season, 31 episodes	Zachariah O'Hora	November 14, 2024 – present	PBS Kids	Fuzzytown Productions Spiffy Pictures Yowza! Animation	TV-Y	Flash	
Press Start!	Comedy Adventure	1 season, 6 episodes	TBA	November 21, 2024	Peacock	Cyber Group Studios	TV-Y7	CGI	
Jentry Chau vs. the Underworld	Supernatural Adventure	1 season, 13 episodes	Echo Wu	December 5, 2024	Netflix	Netflix Animation Studios Buji Productions Trespassers Will Inc. Lightbulb Farm Productions Titmouse, Inc.	TV-Y7	Traditional	
Dream Productions	Comedy Mockumentary	1 season, 4 episodes	Mike Jones	December 11, 2024	Disney+	Pixar Animation Studios	TV-G	CGI	
Wonder Pets: In the City	Adventure	2 seasons, 26 episodes	Jennifer Oxley	December 13, 2024 – March 20, 2026	Apple TV+	Nickelodeon Animation Studio Snowflake Films NYC Kavaleer Productions	TV-Y	Flash	
StuGo	Comedy Science fiction	1 season, 20 episodes	Ryan Gillis	January 11 – May 3, 2025	Disney Channel	Titmouse, Inc. Disney Television Animation	TV-Y7	Flash	
Team Mekbots Animal Rescue		1 season, 13 episodes	TBA	January 16, 2025	Peacock	More Minds Studio		CGI	
RoboGobo	Superhero	2 seasons, 50 episodes	Chris Gilligan	January 17, 2025 – present	Disney Jr.	Brown Bag Films	TV-Y	CGI	
Mermicorno: Starfall	Comedy Fantasy Adventure	1 season, 26 episodes	Simone Legno	January 30, 2025	Cartoon Network	Atomic Cartoons Thunderbird Entertainment	TV-Y7	Flash	
Goldie		1 season, 13 episodes	Emily Brundige	February 14, 2025	Apple TV+	Mercury Filmworks	TV-Y7	Flash	
Win or Lose	Sports Comedy	1 season, 8 episodes	Carrie Hobson Michael Yates	February 19 – March 12, 2025	Disney+	Pixar Animation Studios	TV-G	CGI	
Skillsville	Science fiction comedy Adventure	1 season, 30 episodes	Carol-Lynn Parente	March 5, 2025 – April 19, 2026	PBS Kids	Sphere Animation	TV-Y	Flash	
Wolf King	Action Adventure	2 seasons, 16 episodes	N/A	March 20 – September 11, 2025	Netflix	Lime Pictures Netflix Animation Studios	TV-PG/TV-Y7	CGI	
Bearbrick		1 season, 13 episodes	Meghan McCarthy	March 21, 2025	Apple TV+	DreamWorks Animation Television Dentsu Entertainment	TV-Y7	CGI	
Iyanu: Child of Wonder	Action Superhero	2 seasons, 20 episodes	Roye Okupe	April 5, 2025 – present	Cartoon Network Max / HBO Max	Lion Forge Entertainment YouNeek Studios Impact X Capital Forefront Media Group	TV-PG	Traditional	
Super Duper Bunny League	Superhero	2 seasons, 26 episodes	N/A	April 19 – December 27, 2025	Nickelodeon	Scull & Belt Business Finland Audiovisual Production Incentive Nickelodeon Animation Studio	TV-Y	Flash	
Asterix and Obelix: The Big Fight	Miniseries	1 season, 5 episodes	Alain Chabat	April 30, 2025	Netflix	Netflix Animation Studios TAT Productions Les Éditions Dargaud	TV-PG	CGI	
Acoustic Rooster: Jazzy Jams		1 season, 8 episodes	Kwame Alexander	May 1, 2025	PBS Kids	WGBH Kids Global Mechanic Media	TV-Y	Flash	
BeddyByes	Educational	1 season, 52 episodes	John Rice Alan Shannon	May 31, 2025 – present	CBeebies RTÉ KIDSjr Disney Jr.	JAM Media	TV-Y	CGI	
Wylde Pak	Comedy	2 seasons, 26 episodes	Paul Watling Kyle Marshall	June 6, 2025 – present	Nickelodeon	Nickelodeon Animation Studio	TV-Y7	Flash/Traditional	
Not a Box		1 season, 8 episodes	TBA	June 13, 2025	Apple TV+	Silver Creek Falls Entertainment	TV-Y	Flash	
Mickey Mouse Clubhouse+	Educational	2 seasons, 40 episodes	Rob LaDuca Kim Duran	July 21, 2025 – present	Disney Jr. Disney+	Disney Television Animation	TV-Y	CGI	
Weather Hunters	Educational	1 season, 40 episodes	Al Roker	September 8, 2025 – present	PBS Kids	Al Roker Entertainment Silver Creek Falls Entertainment	TV-Y	CGI/Flash	
Dr. Seuss's Red Fish, Blue Fish	Educational Adventure	3 seasons, 15 episodes	N/A	September 8, 2025 – present	Netflix	Netflix Animation Studios Dr. Seuss Enterprises Atomic Cartoons	TV-Y	Flash	
Charlotte's Web		1 season, 3 episodes	N/A	October 2, 2025	HBO Max	Sesame Workshop Guru Studio	TV-PG	CGI	
The Sisters Grimm	Adventure	2 seasons, 6 episodes	TBA	October 3, 2025	Apple TV+	Titmouse, Inc.	TV-Y7	Flash	
Dr. Seuss's Horton!	Educational Adventure	2 seasons, 13 episodes	N/A	October 6, 2025 – present	Netflix	Netflix Animation Studios Dr. Seuss Enterprises Brown Bag Films	TV-Y	CGI	
The Bad Guys: The Series	Heist Comedy	2 seasons, 19 episodes	N/A	November 6, 2025 – present	Netflix	DreamWorks Animation Television	TV-Y7	CGI	
Bat-Fam	Superhero	1 season, 10 episodes	N/A	November 10, 2025 – present	Amazon Prime Video	Warner Bros. Animation DC Entertainment Amazon MGM Studios	TV-Y7	Flash Traditional	
Hey A.J.!	Educational	1 season, 25 episodes	Leo Wilson	January 13, 2026 – present	Disney Jr.	Surfing Giant Studios	TV-Y	Flash/Traditional	
Phoebe & Jay	Educational	1 season, 16 episodes	Genie Deez Thy Than	February 2, 2026 –present	PBS Kids	Phoebe & Jay Productions Mainframe Studios Peter Hannan Productions (interstitials)	TV-Y	Flash	
Magicampers	Educational	1 season, 22 episodes	Obie Scott Wade	March 23, 2026 – present	Disney Jr.	ObieCo	TV-Y	CGI	
Regular Show: The Lost Tapes		1 season, 38 episodes	J. G. Quintel	May 11, 2026 – present	Cartoon Network	Cartoon Network Studios	TV-PG	Traditional	
Sofia the First: Royal Magic	Fantasy	1 season, 11 episodes	Craig Gerber	May 25, 2026 – present	Disney Television Animation Electric Emu Productions	Disney Jr.		CGI	
Dragon Striker	Fantasy	1 season, 11 episodes	Sylvain Dos Santos	June 9, 2026 – present	Disney+	Cyber Group Studios	TV-Y7-FV	Traditional	
Dragon Striker	Fantasy	1 season, 11 episodes	Sylvain Dos Santos	June 9, 2026 – present	Disney+	La Chouette Compagnie	TV-Y7-FV	Traditional	
Dragon Striker	Fantasy	1 season, 11 episodes	Sylvain Dos Santos	June 9, 2026 – present	Disney Channel	Disney EMEA Animation Studio	TV-Y7-FV	Traditional	
The Doomies	Adventure	1 season, 22 episodes	Andrès Fernandez	June 26, 2026 – present	Disney+	Xilam Animation	TV-PG	Traditional	
The Doomies	Adventure	1 season, 22 episodes	Rémi Zaarour	June 26, 2026 – present	Disney+	Disney Television Animation	TV-PG	Traditional	
Adventure Time: Side Quests	Science fantasy Adventure Surreal comedy	2 seasons, 40 episodes	Nate Cash	June 29, 2026 – present	Hulu Disney+	Fred Films Cartoon Network Studios	TV-PG	Flash/Traditional	
Super Why's Comic Book Adventures		1 season, 20 episodes	TBA	October 5, 2026 – present	PBS Kids	9 Story Media Group Brown Bag Films		Flash/Traditional	
Avatar: Seven Havens	Action	1 season, 13 episodes	Bryan Konietzko Michael Dante DiMartino	October 9, 2026 – present	Paramount+	Nickelodeon Animation Studio Avatar Studios Ginormous Madman Films		Traditional	
Doozie's Doghouse	Preschool	1 season, 7 episodes	Traci Paige Johnson Jennifer Twomey	November 9, 2026	Netflix	DreamWorks Animation Television		CGI/Live-action	

=== United Kingdom ===
Title	Genre	Seasons/episodes	Show creator(s)	Original release	Network	Studio	Age rating	Technique	Sources
Elliott from Earth	Science fiction Comedy	1 season, 16 episodes	Guillaume Cassuto Mic Graves Tony Hull	March 29 – April 9, 2021	Cartoon Network	Cartoon Network Studios Europe	TV-Y7	Flash	
Odo	Educational	1 season, 13 episodes	Colin Williams	December 2, 2021 – present	HBO Max	Sixteen South Letko	TV-Y	Flash	
Dodo	Comedy	1 season, 20 episodes	Jack Bennett	April 28, 2022 – present	Cartoon Network HBO Max	CAKE Entertainment Wildseed Studios		Flash	

=== Canada ===
Title	Genre	Seasons/episodes	Show creator(s)	Original release	Network	Studio	Age rating	Technique	Sources
StarBeam	Superhero	4 seasons, 35 episodes	Loris Lunsford Jason Netter	April 3, 2020 – December 14, 2021	Netflix	Kickstart Productions	TV-Y	CGI	
Ollie's Pack	Comedy	1 season, 27 episodes	Pedro Eboli Graham Peterson	April 6, 2020 – May 6, 2021	YTV	Nelvana	TV-Y7	Flash	
Zokie of Planet Ruby	Comedy	1 season, 26 episodes	Brian Morante	December 31, 2023	YTV Amazon Prime Video	Nelvana Corus Entertainment	TV-Y7	Flash	

=== Co-productions ===
==== European ====
Title	Genre	Seasons/episodes	Show creator(s)	Original release	Network	Studio	Age rating	Technique	Sources
Powerbirds	Action	1 season, 19 episodes	Stephen P. Breen Jennifer Monier-Williams	January 19 – July 17, 2020	Universal Kids	Brown Bag Films	TV-Y	Flash	
Angry Birds: Summer Madness	Comedy Adventure Slapstick	3 seasons, 36 episodes	Rob Doherty Scott Sonneborn	January 28 – August 25, 2022	Netflix	Rovio Animation Cake Entertainment Kickstart Entertainment	TV-Y7	Flash	
The Wonderfully Weird World of Gumball	Sitcom Slapstick Satire Black comedy Surreal comedy	2 seasons, 40 episodes	Ben Bocquelet	July 28, 2025 – present	Hulu (United States) Cartoon Network/HBO Max (International)	Hanna-Barbera Studios Europe Studio Soi Bobbypills	TV-PG	CGI/Flash/Stop-motion/Traditional/Live-action/Puppetry	

==== Canadian ====
Title	Genre	Seasons/episodes	Show creator(s)	Original release	Network	Studio	Age rating	Technique	Sources
Kipo and the Age of Wonderbeasts	Action Adventure Science fantasy Post-apocalyptic Comedy drama	3 seasons, 30 episodes	Radford Sechrist	January 14 – October 12, 2020	Netflix	DreamWorks Animation Television		Traditional	
Remy & Boo	Adventure	1 season, 26 episodes	Matthew Fernandes	May 1 – October 10, 2020	Universal Kids	Industrial Brothers Boat Rocker Studios		CGI	
Hero Elementary	Educational Superhero	1 season, 40 episodes	Carol-Lynn Parente Christine Ferraro	June 1, 2020 – January 4, 2022	PBS Kids	Portfolio Entertainment Twin Cities PBS		Flash	
Elinor Wonders Why	Science fiction	2 seasons, 63 episodes	Jorge Cham Daniel Whiteson	September 7, 2020 – present	PBS Kids	Pipeline Studios Shoe Ink		Flash	
Mighty Express	Educational Action	7 seasons, 44 episodes	Keith Chapman	September 22, 2020 – August 29, 2022	Netflix	Spin Master Entertainment Atomic Cartoons		CGI	
My Little Pony: Pony Life	Comedy Fantasy	2 seasons, 40 episodes		November 7, 2020 – May 22, 2021	Discovery Family	Entertainment One Boulder Media		Flash	
Pikwik Pack	Educational	1 season, 26 episodes	Frank Falcone Mary Bredin Rachel Reade Marcus	November 7, 2020 – November 1, 2021	Disney Junior	Guru Studio Corus Entertainment		Flash	
Dino Ranch	Adventure Comedy Educational	3 seasons, 65 episodes	Matthew Fernandes	January 16, 2021 – April 29, 2024	CBC Kids	Industrial Brothers Boat Rocker Studios		CGI	
Go, Dog. Go!	Educational	4 seasons, 40 episodes	Adam Peltzman	January 26, 2021 – November 27, 2023	Netflix	WildBrain Studios DreamWorks Animation Television		CGI	
The Snoopy Show	Comedy	3 seasons, 39 episodes	Rob Boutilier Steve Evangelatos Behzad Mansoori-Dara Ridd Sorensen	February 5, 2021 – December 1, 2023	Apple TV+	WildBrain Studios Schulz Studio		Flash	
Thomas & Friends: All Engines Go	Comedy	4 seasons, 161 episodes	Rick Suvalle	September 13, 2021 – September 11, 2025	Cartoon Network (seasons 1–2) Netflix (seasons 3–4)	Mattel Television Nelvana	TV-Y	Flash	
Strawberry Shortcake: Berry in the Big City	Adventure Comedy Musical	3 seasons, 60 episodes	Michael Vogel	September 18, 2021 – May 10, 2024	YouTube Family Jr.	WildBrain Studios	TV-Y7	Flash	
Big Blue	Educational Comedy	1 season, 26 episodes	Gyimah Gariba	December 4, 2021 – June 18, 2022	CBC Kids Ici Radio-Canada Télé	Rocket Fund Guru Studio		Flash	
Super Wish		1 season, 52 episodes	Adrian Thatcher Vanessa Esteves	June 4, 2022	YTV	Nelvana Redknot		Flash	
Summer Memories	Comedy	1 season, 20 episodes	Adam Yaniv	August 12, 2022 – February 24, 2023	Family Channel	A&N Productions Ltd. Aircraft Pictures Yeti Farm The Hive Studio WildBrain Studios		Flash	
Saving Me	Animated sitcom Science fiction Slice of life	2 seasons, 20 episodes	Aaron Johnston	October 1, 2022 – present	BYUtv Family Channel BRAVE+	Sphere Media BYUtv		Flash	
Rosie's Rules	Educational	2 seasons, 52 episodes	Jennifer Hamburg	October 3, 2022 – present	PBS Kids TVOKids	9 Story Media Group Brown Bag Films		Flash	
Work It Out Wombats!	Educational Preschool	2 seasons, 47 episodes	Kathy Waugh Marcy Gunther	February 6, 2023 – present	PBS Kids	GBH Kids Pipeline Studios		Flash	
Builder Brothers Dream Factory	Comedy	1 season, 24 episodes	Drew Scott Jonathan Scott	March 26, 2023	Treehouse TV	Scott Brothers Entertainment Sinking Ship Entertainment		CGI	
Open Season: Call of Nature	Comedy	1 season, 26 episodes	Jennie Stacey Kent Redecker	November 3, 2023 – May 31, 2024	Family Channel	Sony Pictures Animation 9 Story Media Group Brown Bag Films Toronto		Flash	
Cocomelon Lane	Educational	7 seasons, 28 episodes	Guy Toubes, Brandon Violette	November 19, 2023 – present	Netflix	Atomic Cartoons Infinite Studios Moonbug Entertainment	TV-Y	CGI	
Caillou (2024)		1 season, 52 episodes	TBA	February 15 – December 5, 2024	Peacock	Mainframe Studios; Splash Entertainment	TV-Y	CGI	
Dora	Preschool Adventure	4 seasons, 104 episodes	Chris Gifford	April 12, 2024 – present	Paramount+	Nickelodeon Animation Studio Little Coop Walsh Valdés Productions Pipeline Studios	TV-Y	CGI	

==== British ====
Title	Genre	Seasons/episodes	Show creator(s)	Original release	Network	Studio	Age rating	Technique	Sources
It's Pony	Comedy	2 seasons, 46 episodes	Ant Blades	January 18, 2020 – May 26, 2022	Nickelodeon	Blue-Zoo Animation	TV-Y7	Traditional/Flash	
Chico Bon Bon: Monkey with a Tool Belt	Comedy	4 seasons, 38 episodes	N/A	May 8 – December 4, 2020	Netflix	Silvergate Media Brown Bag Films	TV-Y	CGI	
Wolfboy and the Everything Factory	Comedy	2 seasons, 20 episodes	Toff Mazery Edward Jesse	September 24, 2021 – September 30, 2022	Apple TV+	Toff's Tiny Universe HitRecord Bento Box Entertainment	TV-Y7	Traditional/Flash	
Big Tree City	Action Comedy	1 season, 15 episodes	TBA	August 1, 2022	Netflix	Blue Zoo Animation	TV-Y	CGI	
Bad Dinosaurs	Comedy	1 season, 8 episodes	TBA	March 28, 2024 – present	Netflix	Netflix Animation Studios Snafu Pictures	TV-Y7	CGI	
Talking Tom Heroes: Suddenly Super		TBA	TBA	October 30, 2025	CBeebies	Epic Story Media ReDefine Originals Outfit7	TV-Y7	CGI	
MaeBee		TBA	Tim O'Sullivan Becca O'Sullivan	October 19, 2026	CBeebies	Karrot Entertainment		Flash	

==== French ====
Title	Genre	Seasons/episodes	Show creator(s)	Original release	Network	Studio	Age rating	Technique	Sources
Droners	Adventure Comedy Science fiction	2 seasons, 52 episodes	Pierre de Cabissole Sylvain Dos Santos	October 19, 2020 – June 30, 2024	TF1	Cyber Group Studios La Chouette Compagni Supamonks Studios	TV-Y7	Flash	
City of Ghosts	Mockumentary Fantasy	1 season, 6 episodes	Elizabeth Ito	March 5, 2021	Netflix	TeamTO Netflix Animation Studios	TV-Y	CGI	
The BeatBuds, Let's Jam!	Musical Comedy	1 season, 10 episodes	Evan Sinclair	June 7, 2021 – present	Nickelodeon	SB Projects Cyber Group Studios	TV-Y	Flash	
Chip 'n' Dale: Park Life	Comedy Slapstick	2 seasons, 30 episodes	Olivier Jean-Marie	July 28, 2021 – May 22, 2024	Disney+	The Walt Disney Company France Xilam Animation	TV-Y7	Flash	
Oggy Oggy	Comedy	3 seasons, 52 episodes	Jean Cayrol Cédric Guarneri	August 24, 2021 – October 16, 2023	Netflix	Xilam Animation	TV-Y	CGI	
Karate Sheep	Comedy	2 seasons, 26 episodes	TBA	March 2, 2023	Netflix Gulli Toggo	Xilam		CGI/Flash	
Belfort & Lupin	Adventure Comedy-drama	1 season, 26 episodes	Teddy J. Stehly	February 7 – May 16, 2025	France 4	Ellipsanime Productions Dargaud Media Belvision Studios		CGI/Traditional	

==== Italian ====
Title	Genre	Seasons/episodes	Show creator(s)	Original release	Network	Studio	Age rating	Technique	Sources
Girls of Olympus	Fantasy	1 season, 26 episodes	TBA	July 16, 2021 – present	Rai Gulp	The Animation Band		Flash	

==== Asia Pacific ====
Title	Genre	Seasons/episodes	Show creator(s)	Original release	Network	Studio	Age rating	Technique	Sources
Mira, Royal Detective	Mystery Comedy Musical	2 seasons, 54 episodes	Becca Topol	March 20, 2020 – June 20, 2022	Disney Junior DisneyNow (season 2)	Technicolor Animation Productions Wild Canary Animation	TV-Y	CGI	
Kung Fu Wa!	Action Comedy	1 season, 52 episodes	Bo Fan	July 25, 2022 (Pop)	Tencent Video CCTV-14	UYoung Tencent Penguin Pictures		Flash	
Tom and Jerry	Comedy Slapstick	1 season, 7 episodes	N/A	August 7 - December 9, 2023	Cartoon Network HBO Go	Aum Animation Studios India Warner Bros. Animation	TV-G	Flash	

== Upcoming ==
Title	Genre	Seasons/episodes	Show creator(s)	Original release	Original channel	Studio	Age rating	Technique	Source
Garfield		TBA	TBA	December 11, 2026	Paramount+	Nickelodeon Animation Studio			
Garfield		TBA	TBA	December 11, 2026	Paramount+	Paws, Inc.			
HexVets and Magic Pets	Adventure Comedy	TBA	Nicole Dubuc	January 18, 2027	Nickelodeon	Boom! Studios Nickelodeon Animation Studio Blue Zoo Animation Studio		CGI Traditional	
Chickies		TBA	TBA	June 23, 2027	TBA	Xilam Animation		CGI	
Cars: Lightning Racers	Educational	TBA	TBA	July 24, 2027	Disney Jr.	Disney Television Animation Pixar Animation Studios ICON Creative Studio		CGI	
Avengers: Mightiest Friends	Educational Superhero	TBA	TBA	2027	Disney Jr.	Marvel Studios Atomic Cartoons		CGI	
Doctor Who: TARDIS Crew		TBA	TBA	2027	CBeebies	BBC Studios Distribution			
Luna in Dreamland		TBA	TBA	2027	BBC iPlayer	Flickerpix Copa Studios			
Motel Transylvania		TBA	TBA	2027	Netflix	Sony Pictures Animation		CGI	
The Sunnyridge 3		TBA	Stevie Gee Essy May	2027	Disney+	Blink Industries Boat Rocker Studios Disney EMEA Animation Studio		Flash	
The UnderGlow		TBA	Tanya Scott Sam Morrison	2027	CBeebies	Gigglebug YLE and A Productions		Flash	
Darkwing Duck (2028)		TBA	TBA	2028	Disney+	Disney Television Animation			
Darkwing Duck (2028)		TBA	TBA	2028	Disney+	Point Grey Pictures			
Adventure Time: Heyo BMO	Educational	TBA	Adam Muto Ashlyn Anstee	TBA	Cartoon Network	Frederator Studios Cartoon Network Studios			
Avatar Kuruk: Wave of Chaos	Action	TBA	Michael Dante DiMartino	TBA	Nickelodeon	Nickelodeon Animation Studio			
Barbara Throws a Wobbler		TBA	Joris van Hulzen	TBA	Cartoon Network	Hanna-Barbera Studios Europe			
Bewitched		TBA	TBA	TBA	TBA	Sony Pictures Television Kids			
Born Driven		TBA	TBA	TBA	Nickelodeon	Nickelodeon Animation Studio Lion Forge Animation			
Charlie and the Chocolate Factory	Miniseries	TBA	Taika Waititi	TBA	Netflix	Sardine Productions			
Chippy Hood		TBA	TBA	TBA	TBA	Mostapes Lion Forge Animation Imagine Kids+Family		Flash	
Cookies & Milk		TBA	TBA	TBA	Disney Channel	Disney Television Animation Cinema Gypsy Productions Jesse James Films		Traditional	
Untitled Crash Bandicoot series		TBA	TBA	TBA	Netflix	Activision WildBrain Studios		CGI	
Dusty Dupree		TBA	Kris Wimberly	TBA	Disney Jr.	Disney Television Animation Electric Emu Productions			
Earthworm Jim: Beyond the Groovy		TBA	TBA	TBA	TBA	Interplay Entertainment		CGI	
The Elephant & Piggie Show!		TBA	TBA	TBA	Paramount+	Hidden Pigeon Company			
Foster's Funtime for Imaginary Friends	Educational	TBA	Craig McCracken	TBA	TBA	Hanna-Barbera Studios Europe		Flash	
Go-Go Mystery Machine		TBA	Francisco Paredes	TBA	Cartoon Network	Warner Bros. Animation			
Gumby Kids		TBA	Deeki Deke	TBA	TBA	Bento Box Entertainment			
Heiress		TBA	TBA	TBA	TBA	Lion Forge Animation Bron Digital			
Hotel Whiskers		TBA	TBA	TBA	TBA	Sony Pictures Television Kids			
Iron Dragon		TBA	TBA	TBA	Nickelodeon	Nickelodeon Animation Studio Lion Forge Animation			
Journey		TBA	TBA	TBA	Disney+	Disney Television Animation			
Juno the Jellyfish		TBA	Jess Hitchman	TBA	TBA	9 Story Media Group Scholastic Entertainment Crayola Studios		CGI	
The Magic Roundabout		TBA	TBA	TBA	TBA	Method Animation Wildseed Studios Magic!		CGI	
The Magic School Bus: Mighty Explorers		TBA	TBA	TBA	TBA	9 Story Media Group Brown Bag Films Scholastic Entertainment		CGI	
Mama & Dada		TBA	Jimmy Fallon Johanna Stein Noelle Lara	TBA	TBA	DreamWorks Animation Television Electric Hot Dog			
Marley and the Family Band		TBA	TBA	TBA	Nickelodeon	Nickelodeon Animation Studio Lion Forge Animation Polygram Entertainment			
Messi and the Giants		TBA	Guy Toubes Dan Creteur	TBA	Disney Channel	Sony Music Vision Sony Pictures Television Kids Leo Messi Management Atlantis Animation		CGI	
Miffy		1 season, 78 episodes	TBA	TBA	Canal+	Superprod Animation StudioCanal Mercis		CGI	
Millie Magnificent		1 season, 52 episodes	TBA	TBA	Canal+ Treehouse TV	Nelvana		CGI	
Untitled Minecraft series		TBA	TBA	TBA	Netflix	Netflix Animation Studios Mojang Studios WildBrain Studios		CGI	
Momoguro		TBA	TBA	TBA	TBA	Baobab Studios		Flash	
The Partridge Family		TBA	TBA	TBA	TBA	Sony Pictures Television Kids			
The Pigeon Show!		TBA	TBA	TBA	Paramount+	Hidden Pigeon Company			
Pingu		TBA	TBA	TBA	TBA	Aardman Animations Mattel Studios		Stop-Motion	
The Powerpuff Girls	Superhero	TBA	Craig McCracken	TBA	TBA	Hanna-Barbera Studios Europe			
The Powers		TBA	TBA	TBA	TBA	Sony Pictures Television Kids Sow You Entertainment			
Rainbow Brite		TBA	TBA	TBA	TBA	Crayola Studios Cake Entertainment Hallmark Cards			
Sharks on Wheels		TBA	Bryan Korn Chantal Arisohn	TBA	TBA	Sony Pictures Television Kids			
Slayer Family Band		TBA	TBA	TBA	TBA	Sony Pictures Television Kids			
Stuart Little		TBA	TBA	TBA	TBA	Sony Pictures Television Kids		Flash	
Surf's Up: The Series		TBA	TBA	TBA	TBA	Atomic Cartoons Sony Pictures Animation		CGI	
Tiny Trailblazers		TBA	TBA	TBA	Disney Jr.	Hello Sunshine Disney Television Animation			
¡Vamos!		TBA	TBA	TBA	TBA	Sony Pictures Television Kids			
Wacky Wednesday		TBA	TBA	TBA	Netflix	Netflix Animation Studios Dr. Seuss Enterprises			
Witch Detectives		TBA	TBA	TBA	TBA	Method Animation Trickstudio Lutterbeck Letko Toonz Entertainment		CGI	

== See also ==
- List of children's animated films
