= List of Scooby-Doo characters =

Velma Dinkley, Shaggy Rogers, Fred Jones, Scooby-Doo and Daphne Blake as seen in Scooby-Doo! Mystery Incorporated

This is a list of Scooby-Doo characters. Scooby-Doo is an American animated franchise based around several animated television series and animated films, as well as live action movies. There are five main characters in the franchise: Scooby-Doo, Norville "Shaggy" Rogers, Fred Jones, Daphne Blake and Velma Dinkley—known as "Mystery Incorporated". The original series, Scooby-Doo, Where Are You!, premiered in 1969, and has spawned many follow-up series and several direct-to-DVD films.

== Cast table ==
Title	Notes	Release date	Fred Jones	Scooby Doo	Norville "Shaggy" Rogers	Daphne Blake	Velma Dinkley
Television series
Scooby-Doo, Where Are You!	Season 1	1969–1970	Frank Welker	Don Messick	Casey Kasem	Stefanianna Christopherson	Nicole Jaffe
Scooby-Doo, Where Are You!	Season 2	1969–1970	Frank Welker	Don Messick	Casey Kasem	Heather North	Nicole Jaffe
Scooby-Doo, Where Are You!	Season 3	1978	Frank Welker	Don Messick	Casey Kasem	Heather North	Pat Stevens
The New Scooby-Doo Movies		1972–73	Frank Welker	Don Messick	Casey Kasem	Heather North	Nicole Jaffe
The Scooby-Doo Show		1976–78	Frank Welker	Don Messick	Casey Kasem	Heather North	Pat Stevens
Scooby-Doo and Scrappy-Doo	Episodes 1–11	1979–80	Frank Welker	Don Messick	Casey Kasem	Heather North	Pat Stevens
Scooby-Doo and Scrappy-Doo	Episodes 12–16	1979–80	Frank Welker	Don Messick	Casey Kasem	Heather North	Marla Frumkin
Scooby-Doo and Scrappy-Doo		1980–82	N/A	Don Messick	Casey Kasem	N/A	
The New Scooby Mysteries		1983–84	Frank Welker	Don Messick	Casey Kasem	Heather North	Marla Frumkin
The 13 Ghosts of Scooby-Doo		1985	N/A	Don Messick	Casey Kasem	Heather North	N/A
A Pup Named Scooby-Doo		1988–91	Carl Steven	Don Messick	Casey Kasem	Kellie Martin	Christina Lange
What's New, Scooby-Doo?		2002–06	Frank Welker		Casey Kasem	Grey DeLisle	Mindy Cohn
Shaggy & Scooby-Doo Get a Clue!		2006–08	Frank Welker		Scott Menville	Grey DeLisle	Mindy Cohn
Scooby-Doo! Mystery Incorporated		2010–13	Frank Welker		Matthew Lillard	Grey DeLisle	Mindy Cohn
Be Cool, Scooby-Doo!		2015–18	Frank Welker		Matthew Lillard	Grey DeLisle	Kate Micucci
Scooby-Doo and Guess Who?		2019–2021	Frank Welker		Matthew Lillard	Grey DeLisle	Kate Micucci
Velma		2023–2024	Glenn Howerton	N/A	Sam Richardson	Constance Wu	Mindy Kaling
Scooby-Doo Live Action series (Netflix)		TBD	Maxwell Jenkins		Tanner Hagen	McKenna Grace	Abby Ryder Fortson
Animated films
Scooby-Doo Meets the Boo Brothers		October 18, 1987	N/A	Don Messick	Casey Kasem	N/A	
Scooby-Doo and the Ghoul School		October 16, 1988	N/A	Don Messick	Casey Kasem	N/A	
Scooby-Doo! and the Reluctant Werewolf		November 13, 1988	N/A	Don Messick	Casey Kasem	N/A	
Scooby-Doo! in Arabian Nights		September 3, 1994	N/A	Don Messick	Casey Kasem	N/A	
Scooby-Doo on Zombie Island		September 22, 1998	Frank Welker	Scott Innes	Billy West	Mary Kay Bergman	B. J. Ward
Scooby-Doo! and the Witch's Ghost		October 5, 1999	Frank Welker	Scott Innes	Scott Innes	Mary Kay Bergman	B. J. Ward
Scooby-Doo and the Alien Invaders		October 3, 2000	Frank Welker	Scott Innes	Scott Innes	Mary Kay Bergman	B. J. Ward
Scooby-Doo and the Cyber Chase		October 9, 2001	Frank Welker	Scott Innes	Scott Innes	Grey DeLisle	B. J. Ward
Scooby-Doo! and the Legend of the Vampire		March 4, 2003	Frank Welker	Frank Welker	Casey Kasem	Heather North	Nicole Jaffe
Scooby-Doo! and the Monster of Mexico		September 30, 2003	Frank Welker	Frank Welker	Casey Kasem	Heather North	Nicole Jaffe
Scooby-Doo! and the Loch Ness Monster		June 22, 2004	Frank Welker	Frank Welker	Casey Kasem	Grey DeLisle	Mindy Cohn
Aloha, Scooby-Doo!		February 8, 2005	Frank Welker	Frank Welker	Casey Kasem	Grey DeLisle	Mindy Cohn
Scooby-Doo! in Where's My Mummy?		December 13, 2005	Frank Welker	Frank Welker	Casey Kasem	Grey DeLisle	Mindy Cohn
Scooby-Doo! Pirates Ahoy!		September 19, 2006	Frank Welker	Frank Welker	Casey Kasem	Grey DeLisle	Mindy Cohn
Chill Out, Scooby-Doo!		September 4, 2007	Frank Welker	Frank Welker	Casey Kasem	Grey DeLisle	Mindy Cohn
Scooby-Doo! and the Goblin King		September 23, 2008	Frank Welker	Frank Welker	Casey Kasem	Grey DeLisle	Mindy Cohn
Scooby-Doo! and the Samurai Sword		April 7, 2009	Frank Welker	Frank Welker	Casey Kasem	Grey DeLisle	Mindy Cohn
Scooby-Doo! Abracadabra-Doo		February 16, 2010	Frank Welker	Frank Welker	Matthew Lillard	Grey DeLisle	Mindy Cohn
Scooby-Doo! Camp Scare		September 14, 2010	Frank Welker	Frank Welker	Matthew Lillard	Grey DeLisle	Mindy Cohn
Scooby-Doo! Legend of the Phantosaur		September 6, 2011	Frank Welker	Frank Welker	Matthew Lillard	Grey DeLisle	Mindy Cohn
Scooby-Doo! Music of the Vampire		March 13, 2012	Frank Welker (Singing Fred: Jim Wise)	Frank Welker	Matthew Lillard	Grey DeLisle	Mindy Cohn (Singing Velma: Bets Malone)
Big Top Scooby-Doo!		October 9, 2012	Frank Welker	Frank Welker	Matthew Lillard	Grey DeLisle	Mindy Cohn
Scooby-Doo! Mask of the Blue Falcon		February 26, 2013	Frank Welker	Frank Welker	Matthew Lillard	Grey DeLisle	Mindy Cohn
Scooby-Doo! Adventures: The Mystery Map		July 23, 2013	Frank Welker	Frank Welker	Matthew Lillard	Grey DeLisle	Stephanie D'Abruzzo
Scooby-Doo! Stage Fright		August 20, 2013	Frank Welker	Frank Welker	Matthew Lillard	Grey DeLisle	Mindy Cohn
Scooby-Doo! WrestleMania Mystery		March 25, 2014	Frank Welker	Frank Welker	Matthew Lillard	Grey DeLisle	Mindy Cohn
Scooby-Doo! Frankencreepy		August 19, 2014	Frank Welker	Frank Welker	Matthew Lillard	Grey DeLisle	Mindy Cohn
Scooby-Doo! Moon Monster Madness		February 17, 2015	Frank Welker	Frank Welker	Matthew Lillard	Grey DeLisle	Mindy Cohn
Scooby-Doo! and Kiss: Rock and Roll Mystery		July 21, 2015	Frank Welker	Frank Welker	Matthew Lillard	Grey DeLisle	Mindy Cohn
Lego Scooby-Doo! Haunted Hollywood		May 10, 2016	Frank Welker	Frank Welker	Matthew Lillard	Grey DeLisle	Kate Micucci
Scooby-Doo! and WWE: Curse of the Speed Demon		August 9, 2016	Frank Welker	Frank Welker	Matthew Lillard	Grey DeLisle	Kate Micucci
Scooby-Doo! Shaggy's Showdown		February 14, 2017	Frank Welker	Frank Welker	Matthew Lillard	Grey DeLisle	Kate Micucci
Lego Scooby-Doo! Blowout Beach Bash		July 25, 2017	Frank Welker	Frank Welker	Matthew Lillard	Grey DeLisle	Kate Micucci
Scooby-Doo! & Batman: The Brave and the Bold		January 9, 2018	Frank Welker	Frank Welker	Matthew Lillard	Grey DeLisle	Kate Micucci
Scooby-Doo! and the Gourmet Ghost		September 11, 2018	Frank Welker	Frank Welker	Matthew Lillard	Grey DeLisle	Kate Micucci
Scooby-Doo! and the Curse of the 13th Ghost		February 5, 2019	Frank Welker	Frank Welker	Matthew Lillard	Grey DeLisle	Kate Micucci
Scooby-Doo! Return to Zombie Island		October 1, 2019	Frank Welker	Frank Welker	Matthew Lillard	Grey DeLisle	Kate Micucci
Scoob!		May 15, 2020	Zac Efron (Young Fred: Pierce Gagnon)	Frank Welker	Will Forte (Young Shaggy: Iain Armitage)	Amanda Seyfried (Young Daphne: Mckenna Grace)	Gina Rodriguez (Young Velma: Ariana Greenblatt)
Happy Halloween, Scooby-Doo!		October 6, 2020	Frank Welker	Frank Welker	Matthew Lillard	Grey DeLisle	Kate Micucci
Scooby-Doo! The Sword and the Scoob		February 23, 2021	Frank Welker	Frank Welker	Matthew Lillard	Grey DeLisle	Kate Micucci
Straight Outta Nowhere: Scooby-Doo! Meets Courage the Cowardly Dog		September 14, 2021	Frank Welker	Frank Welker	Matthew Lillard	Grey DeLisle	Kate Micucci
Trick or Treat Scooby-Doo!		October 18, 2022	Frank Welker	Frank Welker	Matthew Lillard	Grey DeLisle	Kate Micucci
Scooby-Doo! and Krypto, Too!		September 26, 2023	Frank Welker	Frank Welker	Matthew Lillard	Grey DeLisle	Kate Micucci
Live-action films
Scooby-Doo		June 14, 2002	Freddie Prinze Jr.	Neil Fanning	Matthew Lillard	Sarah Michelle Gellar	Linda Cardellini
Scooby-Doo 2: Monsters Unleashed		March 26, 2004	Freddie Prinze Jr. (Young Fred: Ryan Vrba)	Neil Fanning	Matthew Lillard (Young Shaggy: Cascy Beddow; Shaggy Chick: Nazanin Afshin-Jam)	Sarah Michelle Gellar (Young Daphne: Emily Tennant)	Linda Cardellini (Young Velma: Lauren Kennedy)
Scooby-Doo! The Mystery Begins		September 13, 2009	Robbie Amell	Frank Welker	Nick Palatas	Kate Melton	Hayley Kiyoko
Scooby-Doo! Curse of the Lake Monster		October 16, 2010	Robbie Amell	Frank Welker	Nick Palatas	Kate Melton	Hayley Kiyoko
Daphne & Velma		May 22, 2018	N/A			Sarah Jeffery	Sarah Gilman

== Main characters ==
=== Scooby-Doo ===
Scooby-Doo is the eponymous character in the Scooby-Doo animated television series created by Joe Ruby and Ken Spears alongside the popular American animation company Hanna-Barbera. Scooby-Doo is the pet and lifelong companion of Shaggy Rogers and in many iterations, including the original series, is regarded as a unique anthropomorphic Great Dane dog who is able to speak in broken English, unlike most other dogs in his reality, and usually puts the letter R in front of words spoken. Other incarnations, such as A Pup Named Scooby-Doo, present talking dogs like Scooby as quite common.

The head of children's programming at CBS, Fred Silverman, came up with the character's name from the syllables "doo-be-doo-be-doo" in Frank Sinatra's hit song "Strangers in the Night".

From 1969 to 1994, Scooby was voiced by Don Messick. In the 1997 episode of Johnny Bravo, Scooby was voiced by Hadley Kay. From 1998 to 2001, he was voiced by Scott Innes, who also voiced the character in video game projects (including PC, DVD and board games), commercials and some toys until 2008. In Scooby-Doo and Scooby-Doo 2: Monsters Unleashed, Scooby was voiced by Neil Fanning. Scooby is currently (2002–present) voiced by Frank Welker (the voice of Fred Jones). For parody versions, Scooby was voiced by Mark Hamill in Jay and Silent Bob Strike Back and Seth Green and Dave Coulier in Robot Chicken.

=== Shaggy Rogers ===
Norville "Shaggy" Rogers is Scooby's owner and best friend. Shaggy is a cowardly slacker more interested in eating than solving mysteries. His catchphrase is "Zoinks!".

From 1969 to 1997, Shaggy was voiced by Casey Kasem; he would return to voice him again from 2002 to 2009. In Scooby-Doo on Zombie Island, Shaggy was voiced by Billy West. From 1999 to 2001, he was voiced by Scott Innes, who also voiced Shaggy in video game projects (including PC, DVD and board games), commercials and some toys until 2009. In Shaggy & Scooby-Doo Get a Clue!, Shaggy was voiced by Scott Menville. Shaggy is currently (2010–present) being voiced by Matthew Lillard, who played Shaggy in the live-action theatrical films. He was portrayed by Nick Palatas in the Cartoon Network prequel films, Scooby-Doo! The Mystery Begins (2009) and Scooby-Doo! Curse of the Lake Monster (2010). Will Forte voices Shaggy as an adult with Iain Armitage voicing his younger self in the theatrical animated film Scoob!.

=== Fred Jones ===
Fred Jones, sometimes called "Freddie", is the de facto leader of the gang and normally drives the Mystery Machine. He is often constructing various Rube Goldberg traps for villains, which Scooby-Doo and/or Shaggy would often set off by mistake, causing the villain to be captured another way. Fred usually takes the lead in solving mysteries, often pairing with Daphne and Velma. He is sometimes shown in a romantic pairing with Daphne.

In A Pup Named Scooby-Doo, Fred was depicted as being somewhat less intelligent, believing in legends such as Bigfoot and mole people and often wrongly blaming the crime on the neighborhood bully Red Herring. In the episode "The Song of Mystery" from Scooby-Doo! Mystery Incorporated, he is called Fredrick by his tutor Mary-Ann Geerdon, but is called Fredward in Scooby-Doo! Adventures: The Mystery Map.

Fred is voiced by Frank Welker, who has retained this role throughout every incarnation of each series where Fred is portrayed as a teenager from 1969 to 1984 and again since 1997. In A Pup Named Scooby-Doo, he was voiced by Carl Steven. He was portrayed by Freddie Prinze Jr. in the 2002-2004 live-action films and by Robbie Amell in the Cartoon Network prequel films, Scooby-Doo! The Mystery Begins and Scooby-Doo! Curse of the Lake Monster. Zac Efron voices Fred as an adult while Pierce Gagnon voices his younger self in the theatrical animated film Scoob!.

=== Daphne Blake ===
Daphne Blake is a beautiful, fashionable young girl from a rich family. Portrayed as an enthusiastic, but also clumsy and danger-prone (hence her nickname "Danger-Prone Daphne") member of the gang, she serves as the damsel in distress and would occasionally get kidnapped and imprisoned, only to be saved by the gang. As the franchise progressed, she became a stronger, more independent character in some iterations, with a return to her danger-prone self in others. In some iterations of the franchise, Daphne is either explicitly in love with Fred, or implied to have a crush on him.

Daphne is shown to have a number of hobbies and physical prowess due to her rich upbringing. She also occasionally assists the gang by using beauty products in novel ways. Her catchphrase is "Jeepers!".

Daphne was initially absent alongside Fred and Velma in the 1980s, with the franchise focusing on the comedy antics of Scooby, Shaggy, and Scrappy. However, when the "Whodunnit?" aspect returned to the series with The New Scooby and Scrappy-Doo Show (later retitled The New Scooby-Doo Mysteries), Daphne returned. She also appeared in 13 Ghosts of Scooby-Doo.

Daphne was voiced by Stefanianna Christopherson from 1969 to 1970. She was replaced by Heather North who would voice Daphne until 1997 and again for the two direct-to-DVD movies, Scooby-Doo! and the Legend of the Vampire and Scooby-Doo! and the Monster of Mexico. Daphne was voiced by Mary Kay Bergman from 1998 to 2000. Daphne has been voiced by Grey DeLisle since 2001. In A Pup Named Scooby-Doo, Daphne was voiced by Kellie Martin. She was portrayed by Sarah Michelle Gellar in the 2002-2004 live-action films and by Kate Melton in the 2009-2010 live-action telefilms. Amanda Seyfried voices Daphne as an adult with Mckenna Grace as her younger self in the theatrical animated film Scoob!.

=== Velma Dinkley ===
Velma Dinkley is portrayed as a highly intelligent young woman with various interests, leaving her with a wide breadth of knowledge in obscure topics. Consequently, Velma is usually the one to figure out the mystery, sometimes with the help of Fred and Daphne.

A running gag in the franchise is Velma's severe near-sightedness and her trouble with keeping her glasses on her face (usually after falling off while being chased by the villain). Her catchphrases are: "Jinkies!" and "My glasses! I can't see without my glasses!"

In the original Where Are You! series, Velma attended the same high school as the rest of the gang (as stated in the episode "What a Night for a Knight"). However, in the second series, The New Scooby-Doo Movies, Velma is said to have graduated from a different high school than her friends (as stated in the episode "Spirited Spooked Sports Show").

Velma was voiced by Nicole Jaffe from 1969 to 1973, who would voice the character again in the two direct-to-DVD movies, Scooby-Doo! and the Legend of the Vampire and Scooby-Doo! and the Monster of Mexico. Jaffe was later replaced by Pat Stevens, who would voice Velma from 1976 to 1979; Marla Frumkin replaced her from 1979 to 1980 and would voice the character again in 1984. Velma was voiced by B.J. Ward from 1997 to 2002, by Mindy Cohn from 2002 to 2015 and in A Pup Named Scooby-Doo, Velma was voiced by Christina Lange. Starting with Be Cool, Scooby-Doo! (2015–2018), Velma has been voiced by Kate Micucci. Gina Rodriguez voiced Velma as an adult with Ariana Greenblatt voicing her younger self in the animated theatrical film Scoob!. She was portrayed by Linda Cardellini in the 2002-2004 live-action films and by Hayley Kiyoko in the 2009-2010 live-action telefilms.

== Secondary characters introduced in The Scooby-Doo Show/Scooby-Doo and Scrappy-Doo ==
=== Scrappy-Doo ===
Scrappy-Doo is Scooby-Doo's feisty nephew. He was added to the cast of Scooby-Doo to save the franchise's low ratings, which threatened to cause its cancellation. After his addition to the show proved to be a ratings success, Hanna-Barbera restructured the show around Scrappy in 1980. The original format of four teenagers and their dog(s) solving supernatural mysteries for a half-hour was eschewed for simpler, more comedic adventures which involved real supernatural villains (the villains in previous Scooby episodes were almost always regular humans in disguise).

Scrappy remained an integral part of the Scooby-Doo franchise, on both television and in Scooby-related licensed products and merchandising, through the end of the 1980s. He was also briefly the star of his own seven-minute shorts — the Scrappy and Yabba Doo segments of The Scooby & Scrappy-Doo/Puppy Hour. Teamed with his uncle Yabba-Doo and Deputy Dusty, he helped maintain law and order in a small town in the American west. In later years, the presence of Scrappy-Doo has been criticized as having had a negative effect on the various Scooby-Doo series of the 1980s. However, the gradual decline of Scooby-Doo has been credited to other factors as well, such as changes in format. Scrappy-Doo has become the symbol of an irritatingly overexuberant or cute character added to a series in an attempt to maintain ratings, a phenomenon also known as Cousin Oliver Syndrome.

Due to the general perception of the character by audiences, Scrappy-Doo has rarely appeared in modern media. He appears as an antagonist in Scooby-Doo (2002), where he seeks revenge on Mystery Inc. for abandoning him and got corrupted by the Daemon Ritus. In Velma, Scrappy is depicted as an artificial lifeform created by Project SCOOB!.

Scrappy was voiced by Lennie Weinrib from 1979 to 1980. Weinrib was later replaced by Don Messick, who voiced Scrappy from 1980 to 1988. Scott Innes voices Scrappy in Scooby-Doo (2002) and Harvey Birdman, Attorney at Law.

=== Scooby-Dum ===
Scooby-Dum (voiced by Alan Oppenheimer) is Scooby-Doo's dimwitted cousin, who lives in the Okefenokee Swamp. He also appears in Laff-A-Lympics, voiced by Daws Butler.

=== Yabba-Doo ===
Yabba-Doo (voiced by Don Messick) is a white Great Dane and Scooby-Doo's brother, who fights crime with his master Deputy Dusty and his enthusiastic nephew Scrappy-Doo. His catchphrase is "Yippity-Yabbity-Doo!", since another character already says, "Yabba-dabba-doo!"

=== Scooby-Dee ===
Scooby-Dee (voiced by Janet Waldo) is a white Great Dane and Scooby-Doo's distant cousin, who appears in The Scooby-Doo Show. She was meant to return to The Scooby-Doo Show as a girlfriend to Scooby-Doo, but the show ended before that could happen.

=== Deputy Dusty ===
Deputy Dusty (voiced by Frank Welker) is a deputy who appears in the Scrappy and Yabba-Doo segments. He alongside Yabba-Doo and Scrappy-Doo would protect their town from various bad guys which always ends with Deputy Dusty, Yabba-Doo, and Scrappy-Doo apprehending the bad guys in the end.

== Introduced in The 13 Ghosts of Scooby-Doo ==
=== Vincent Van Ghoul ===
Vincent Van Ghoul (voiced by Vincent Price) is a magician who assists Mystery Inc. in capturing the 13 Ghosts after Shaggy and Scooby accidentally release them. In Scooby-Doo! Mystery Incorporated, Van Ghoul is voiced by Maurice LaMarche and depicted as an actor who commonly appears in horror films.

=== Flim Flam ===
Flim Flam (voiced by Susan Blu) is a young con artist and ally of Mystery Inc. Flim Flam is introduced in the first episode, "To All the Ghouls I've Loved Before", where he tries to sell a magic concoction in the Himalayan Mountains. However, he is kicked out of town and meets up with the current Scooby gang, who was trying to find the Mystery Machine (an airplane) hidden by Bogel and Weerd. Flim Flam takes them to a psychic (Vincent Van Ghoul) who could help the whole group find the Mystery Machine. When the night falls on the town, the group finds out that the whole town is actually a werewolf cult. When Scrappy, Daphne and Flim Flam question them as to how they got that way in the first place, they are told that they were turned into werewolves as revenge for sealing the Thirteen Ghosts into the Chest of Demons. The group races to keep Shaggy and Scooby from opening the chest, but to no avail. After Shaggy and Scooby open the chest and release the thirteen ghosts within it, Flim Flam decides to join them in their hunt to return the ghosts to the chest.

Flim Flam appears in the sequel film Scooby-Doo! and the Curse of the 13th Ghost, voiced by Noshir Dalal.

=== Weerd and Bogel ===
Weerd and Bogel (respectively voiced by Arte Johnson and Howard Morris) are ghosts and allies of the 13 Ghosts. Weerd is the tall ghost while Bogel is the short ghost. They were the ones responsible for tricking Shaggy and Scooby-Doo into opening the Chest of Demons. Throughout the series, Weerd and Bogel attempt to joins S.A.P.S. (short for Spook and Poltergeist Society), a group of esteemed ghosts and ghouls. When working for the 13 Ghosts, Weerd and Bogel would try to dispose of Scooby-Doo's group which always goes comically awry.

By Scooby-Doo! and the Curse of the 13th Ghost, Weerd and Bogel's status are unknown.

=== 13 Ghosts ===
The 13 Ghosts are a group of malevolent ghosts and demons who were imprisoned in the Chest of Demons. Weerd and Bogel tricked Shaggy and Scooby into opening the Chest to free them.

The 13 Ghosts consist of:

- Maldor the Malevolent (voiced by Peter Cullen) is a ghostly warlock from the Dark Ages who is a master of the black arts.
- Queen Morbida (voiced by Linda Gary) is a vampire-like queen who commands an army of monsters.
- Reflector Spectre (voiced by Michael Rye) is a mirror demon who can trap people in his mirror.
- Zomba (voiced by Susan Blu) is a zombie demon who can transport people into movies and TV shows.
- Captain Ferguson (voiced by Robert Ridgely) is a ghostly sea captain and his crew who haunts the Bermuda Triangle on his ghost ship.
- Nekara (voiced by Linda Gary) is an enchantress who can drain magic with her Trance of Love.
- Marcella (voiced by B. J. Ward) is a witch who manipulated three bumbling witches called the Brewski Sisters into freeing her.
- Time Slime (voiced by Robert Ridgely) is a demon who can manipulate time.
- Demondo (voiced by Michael Rye) is a demon who can imprison people in books and comic strips.
- Rankor (voiced by Hamilton Camp) is a vampiric demon who sought to join S.A.P.S. by having Vincent Van Ghoul look into the Eye of Eternity which slowly turned him to stone.
- Professor Phantazmo (voiced by Alan Oppenheimer) is the ringmaster of the Circus of Horrors which is staffed by demons and monsters.
- Zimbulu (voiced by Peter Cullen in his true form, Edie McClurg in human form) is a humanoid demon with a lion-like mane, claws, and teeth, goat-like hooves and a devil-like horns and tail who posed as a medium named Tallulah.
- The film Scooby-Doo! and the Curse of the 13th Ghost features the 13th Ghost named Asmodeus (voiced by Nolan North).

== Introduced in Scooby-Doo and the Ghoul School ==
- Ms. Grimwood (voiced by Glynis Johns) is the headmistress of Miss Grimwood's Finishing School for Girls while she looks like a human many fans think she might be a witch because of the way she lives, while she never did any magic in the movie she is good with the Ghoul girls and is good at cooking.
- Matches (vocal effects provided by Frank Welker) is Ms. Grimwood's pet dragon in the film he had a strong hatred for Scooby-Doo but over the course of the film grew to like him.

=== The Ghoul Girls ===
The Ghoul Girls are the students at Miss Grimwood's Finishing School for Girls. They consist of:

- Sibella Dracula (voiced by Susan Blu) is the daughter of Count Dracula and the leader of the group of girls. Unlike other versions of Dracula who have pale skin, he and Sibella have purple skin in the movie. It is unknown if Sibella has the same powers as her father as he is the only known she has the ability to turn into a purple bat and she is so far the only vampire immune to sunlight and she is mostly known for the catchphrase "Fangtastic".
- Phantasma (voiced by Russi Taylor), nicknamed "Phanty" by the other girls, is the ghostly daughter of a phantom with fans believing her to be the Phantom of the Opera. She is a cheerful ghoul who loves playing on the piano and pipe organ and is known for her high pitched giggling.
- Elsa Frankenteen (voiced by Pat Musick) is the daughter of Frankteen Sr. and the tallest of the Ghoul girls. She is really smart of science, she is known to be the tough as nails girl and has a great big sister, little sister like relationship with Tanis.
- Winnie (voiced by Marilyn Schreffler in Ghoul School, and Natalie Palamides in OK K.O.! Let's Be Heroes) is a werewolf and the daughter of the Wolf Man. She is depicted as the tomboy of the girls and is very fast for her age.
- Tanis (voiced by Patty Maloney in Scooby-Doo and the Ghoul School, Kristen Li in OK K.O.! Let's Be Heroes) is the daughter of the mummy and the youngest member of the Ghoul girls. During the movie, she always wanted a trophy for her Mummy Case and was so happy that even her father was happy for her. She is also known for her Big Sister, Little Sister relationship with Else Frankenteen.

== Introduced in Scooby-Doo! and the Reluctant Werewolf ==
=== Googie ===
Googie (voiced by B.J. Ward) is the girlfriend of Shaggy in Scooby-Doo! and the Reluctant Werewolf. She has ginger hair and wears purple clothing, visually being similar to Daphne. She is named after Googie architecture.

== Introduced in A Pup Named Scooby-Doo ==
=== Red Herring ===
Red Herring (voiced by Scott Menville) is a neighborhood bully from the gang's hometown in A Pup Named Scooby-Doo. He is a rival of Fred Jones who blames him for crimes even when the monster is caught.

Red Herring makes minor appearances in the comic Scooby-Doo! Team-Up and Happy Halloween, Scooby-Doo!.

=== Jenkins ===
Jenkins (voiced by Don Messick) is the Blake family's butler who shows up to help whenever his name is called and does things for her no matter how ridiculous they are.

=== Newsman ===
The unidentified newsman (voiced by Don Messick) interrupts the show to inform the viewers about different things.

== Introduced in Scooby-Doo on Zombie Island ==
=== Werecats ===
Simone Lenoir (voiced by Adrienne Barbeau), Lena Dupree (voiced by Tara Charendoff), and Jacques (voiced by Jim Cummings) are a trio of immortal werecats who live on Moonscar island, an island in the Louisiana bayou. Simone and Lena originally lived in a village and worshipped a cat god, who they prayed to for bountiful harvests. When the pirate Morgan Moonscar and his crew invaded the island and killed everyone, Simone and Lena escaped, after which the god transformed them into werecats. The two later recruit a ferryman named Jacques and transform him as well upon promising him immortality. The trio used the island to drain the life force of victims, turning them into zombies, before being defeated by Mystery Incorporated, resulting in their deaths.

=== Zombies ===
The zombies are a group of supernatural undead spirits who were killed by the werecats Simon Lenoir, Lena, Dupree, and Jacques on Moonscar Island. Unlike traditional zombies, they are intelligent ghosts that reanimate their own remains, granting them superhuman strength, regeneration, and the ability to reattach severed body parts. Their ranks include victims from various eras, such as the pirate Morgan Moonscar, Colonel Jackson T. Pettigrew (both voiced by Jim Cummings), Civil War soldiers, plantation workers, gangsters, and tourists. Though initially mistaken for monsters, they are benevolent spirits who seek to warn others about the werecats and ultimately help save the gang before finally finding peace after the curse is broken.

== Introduced in Scooby-Doo and the Witch's Ghost ==
=== The Hex Girls ===
The Hex Girls are an eco-goth rock band consisting of members Thorn (Sally McKnight), Dusk, and Luna. Thorn is voiced by Jennifer Hale, Dusk is voiced by Jane Wiedlin and Luna is voiced by Kimberly Brooks. They are first seen as suspects of the mystery that is going on in their hometown, Oakhaven, later becoming the gang's friends. They first appeared in Scooby-Doo! and the Witch's Ghost, and reappeared in Scooby-Doo! and the Legend of the Vampire, What's New, Scooby-Doo?, Scooby-Doo! Mystery Incorporated, and Scooby-Doo and Guess Who?.

In the movie Scooby-Doo! and the Witch's Ghost, they are first seen as suspects of the mystery the gang is investigating. Thorn later plays an important role in Sarah Ravencroft's defeat by reading the spell which sends her back to the spell book where she came from, along with her descendant Ben Ravencroft. Along with Scooby and the rest of the gang, they end up giving a concert to pay for the damage the Ravencrofts did.

In Scooby-Doo! and the Legend of the Vampire, Thorn, Luna and Dusk are the artists that are going to open the Vampire Rock Musical Festival, ending up being kidnapped by Yowie Yahoo's vampire minions, which leads the gang to look for them, while trying to solve the mystery regarding Vampire Rock. They end up being saved and accompany the gang to their performance at the festival.

In the series What's New, Scooby-Doo?, they appear in the episode "The Vampire Strikes Back", where the gang must help them capture a vampire that has been trying to scare them away from a castle in Transylvania, where they are shooting their latest single. According to Daphne, Dusk intended to leave the group to start a solo career, but this was not brought up again with the episode's ending implying she chose to stay.

In Scooby-Doo! Mystery Incorporated, they appear in the episodes "In Fear of the Phantom" and "Dance of the Undead". They ask the gang to help them catch a phantom who wants to put them out of business after Thorn is nearly assassinated by him. After most of Crystal Cove is hypnotized by a zombie ska band, Scooby and Shaggy track them down and ask them for help to defeat them in a battle of the bands. They also help the gang find another clue of the Crystal Cove Mystery, by discovering and deciphering a hidden soundtrack in the Planispheric Disk.

In Scooby-Doo and Guess Who?, they appear in "I put a Hex on you". They received a package from a fan with the cursed Guitar of Ester Moonkiller. After it's played during a concert Thorn and Luna's personalities changed.

The band makes a cameo appearance in an image in the 2020 film Scoob! and the HBO Max's Velma series.

== Introduced in Scooby-Doo and the Alien Invaders ==
=== Crystal and Amber ===
Crystal and Amber (both voiced by Candi Milo) are a pair of aliens who pose as a young female nature photographer and her Golden Retriever in Scooby-Doo and the Alien Invaders. They meet Shaggy and Scooby, who fall madly in love with them. At the end of the film, they reveal their alien forms to face the fake aliens, and leave the planet once their identity is revealed.

== Introduced in Scooby-Doo! and the Loch Ness Monster ==
=== Del Chillman ===
Del Chillman (voiced by Jeff Bennett) was first introduced in Scooby-Doo! and the Loch Ness Monster and subsequently appeared in Chill Out, Scooby-Doo!. He is an amateur cryptozoologist who has hunted the Loch Ness Monster and the Yeti, both times meeting the gang.

== Introduced in Shaggy & Scooby-Doo Get a Clue! ==
=== Robi ===
Robi (voiced by Jim Meskimen) is a loyal robotic servant to Shaggy and Scooby-Doo. Whether he’s a defective model or a failed experimental butler, he has a knack for smashing through walls and causing destruction without hesitation. He serves various purposes for Shaggy and Scooby, though his cooking skills are terrible. Robi enjoys doing impressions, giving safety tips in a style reminiscent of Inspector Gadget, and projecting holograms of Uncle Albert to communicate with Shaggy. He often calls Scooby “Rooby Roo” due to mishearing his voice.

=== Dr. Albert Shaggleford ===
Dr. Albert Shaggleford (voiced by Casey Kasem) is Shaggy’s wealthy uncle, a brilliant inventor once voiced by Brandon McCarter, regularly sends him transmissions from a secret location about Phibes’ activities. In the final episode, it’s revealed he was actually undercover as Dr. Trebla (“Trebla” being “Albert” spelled backwards) and had been transmitting from Phibes’ lair the whole time. It’s also discovered he’s allergic to peanuts, as shown when he was the only one of Phibes’ minions who refused a peanut butter sandwich.

=== Dr. Phineus Phibes ===
Dr. Phineus Phibes (voiced by Jeff Bennett) is a mad scientist and the main antagonist of the series. In his younger days, he carried out a dangerous experiment with electricity that cost him his left hand. He now wears a prosthetic that works like a high-tech Swiss Army knife and has become a living lightning rod—making him avoid going outside, as he’s prone to being struck by lightning no matter the weather. Producer Eric Radomski described Phibes’ lair as deco-inspired, noting that in the 13th episode, a feline companion is introduced. He added that, while Ray DeLaurentis would need to confirm, Dr. Phibes could be described as Col. Klink plus Dr. Evil, divided by Strangelove.

=== Dr. Trebla ===
Dr. Trebla (voiced by Scott Menville) is Dr. Phibes’ trusted right-hand man, always offering advice and tending to his needs like a constant companion. In the series finale, it’s revealed he was actually Uncle Albert undercover the whole time, explaining how he was able to feed information about Phibes to Shaggy and Scooby. A hint to this twist lies in his name—Albert spelled backwards.

=== Agent 1 ===
Agent 1 (voiced by Jim Meskimen) is a no-nonsense character who can’t stand Shaggy and Scooby. Often paired with Agent 2—much to his annoyance—he serves as second in command. Skeptical by nature, he never believes anything his agents say without proof, as shown in "Zoinksman." He’s frequently told to smack Agent 2 when he gets on Dr. Phibes’ nerves and is the only one more easily irritated by Agent 2 than Phibes himself.

=== Agent 2 ===
Agent 2 (voiced by Jeff Bennett) is a somewhat dimwitted and heavyset man who dislikes his name and prefers to be called something else. Over time, he’s taken on various personas, including a ninja in "High Society Scooby" and a racer named Dr. Speed. In one episode, his real name is revealed to be Jeff—a nod to his voice actor—though in an earlier episode, he’s referred to as Zachary.

=== Ricky and Mark ===
Ricky and Mark (voiced by Jeff Bennett and Jim Meskimen) are Dr. Phibes’ resident “techies,” serving as his hackers and engineers. Parodies of Napoleon Dynamite and his brother Kip, they create all sorts of evil gadgets for Phibes’ schemes. Despite their allegiance to him, they’re willing to lend a hand to Shaggy and Scooby whenever the need arises.

=== Menace ===
Menace (voiced by Frank Welker) is a super-strong villain serving as Dr. Phibes' latest minion. After testing the nanotech formula, his strength skyrocketed, but over time he began to lose his mind. He developed an odd fondness for kittens—much to Phibes’ dismay, as he had used stolen nanotech to turn himself into a cat—and even sported smiley faces on his biceps. He’s an obvious parody of Bane.

== Introduced in Scooby-Doo! Abracadabra-Doo ==
=== Madelyn Dinkley ===
Madelyn Dinkley is Velma's younger sister, first introduced in Scooby-Doo! Abracadabra-Doo.

- Madelyn Dinkley voiced by Danica McKellar (in Scooby-Doo! Abracadabra-Doo).

== Introduced in Scooby-Doo! Mystery Incorporated ==
=== Sheriff Bronson Stone ===
Sheriff Bronson Stone (voiced by Patrick Warburton) is the sheriff of Crystal Cove, first appearing in the pilot episode, "Beware the Beast from Below". He is often antagonistic to Mystery Inc., as he believes the monsters are an important revenue stream for the town. During the first season, Stone was loyal to Mayor Fred Jones Sr. until he was unmasked in the season one finale. His comment to Fred Jones Sr. after that was "Say it isn't so?".

In season two, Stone goes to work for Mayor Janet Nettles. Though not comfortable at first, Stone starts to warm up to Nettles and beginning a romantic relationship with her.

In the rebooted timeline depicted in the series finale "Come Undone", Stone and Nettles are married and have four children: Eastwood, Norris, Billy Jack and Lynda Carter.

=== Hot Dog Water (Marcie Fleach) ===
Marcie Fleach (voiced by Linda Cardellini), also known as Hot Dog Water, is a resident of Crystal Cove and Velma's rival. She first appears in "Where Walks Aphrodite" and dresses up as a Manticore in the season one episode "Menace of the Manticore".

In season two, Marcie was released from prison after she helped to improve its security. She joins Mystery Incorporated as Daphne's replacement (and as a mole for Mr E), only to leave in "Web of the Dreamweaver" following Daphne's return. In "Night on the Haunted Mountain", still working for E, she dressed up as "Dark Lilith" in a bit to trick the mystery gang into finding one of the disk pieces but defects from E at the end of the episode giving the piece to Velma instead. In the finale, she is used as bait by Pericles but breaks free, holding him hostage. However, she is taken down and killed off-screen.

In the rebooted timeline depicted in the series finale "Come Undone", Marcie is Velma's girlfriend.

It was revealed by Warner Bros animator Tony Cervone on Instagram that writers of Scooby-Doo! Mystery Incorporated intended for Velma and Marcie to be in a romantic relationship.

=== Mayor Fred Jones Sr. ===
Mayor Fred Jones Sr. (voiced by Gary Cole) is the mayor of Crystal Cove and Fred's adoptive father, first appearing in the pilot. He is proud of Crystal Cove being named the "Most Haunted Place on Earth" and uses it to attract tourism while annoyed that his son and the rest of Mystery Inc. keep unmasking the fake monsters. In the season one finale, it is revealed that he was the Freak of Crystal Cove, had kidnapped Fred when he was a baby in order to prevent Brad and Judy from returning and was behind the disappearance of the original Mystery Incorporated. He was subsequently brought to justice with Sheriff Stone asking "Say it isn't so?". Mayor Fred Jones Sr.'s arrest led to Janet Nettles becoming the new Mayor of Crystal Cove.

In season two, Fred Jones Sr. was seen in prison as Mystery Inc. left some items in his care to keep the items out of Professor Pericles' clutches.

In the rebooted timeline depicted in the series finale "Come Undone", Fred Jones Sr. is the principal and soccer coach of Crystal Cove High School.

=== Mayor Janet Nettles ===
Janet Nettles (voiced by Kate Higgins) is a woman who succeeds Fred Jones Sr. as mayor of Crystal Cove after he is exposed as the Freak of Crystal Cove and arrested. First appearing in "The Night the Clown Cried", she often enlists the help of Mystery Incorporated and begins a romantic relationship with Sheriff Stone. She also has connections to the military.

In the rebooted timeline depicted in the series finale "Come Undone", she and Stone are married and have four children: Eastwood, Norris, Billy Jack and Lynda Carter.

=== Ed Machine ===
Ed Machine (voiced by Richard McGonagle) is the CEO of Destroido Corp and Mr. E's henchman. In the season one finale, Machine helps to save Mystery Inc. Professor Pericles later attacks him to "send a message", leaving it unknown if he was killed or not.

=== The Original "Mystery Incorporated" ===
A group of teenage crime solvers that succeeded the modern group and acted as their namesake.

==== Mr. E (Ricky Owens) ====
Mr. E (voiced primarily by Lewis Black as an adult and Jeff Bennett as a young adult) is a mysterious figure who gives clues to the gang throughout the first season. He is later revealed to be Ricky Owens, a member of the original Mystery Incorporated and an ally of Professor Pericles.

During the second season, Mr. E started to doubt Pericles' work, causing the latter to secretly place remote-activated cobra larva in his spine to ensure his loyalty.

In the rebooted timeline depicted in the series finale "Come Undone", Owens is married to Cassidy Williams and the two work together with Pericles at an environmentally-friendly version of Destroido called Creationex.

==== Angel Dynamite (Cassidy Williams) ====
Cassidy Williams (voiced by Vivica A. Fox and her younger self is voiced by Kimberly Brooks) alias Angel Dynamite, is an ally of Mr. E and a member of the original Mystery Incorporated. She first appears in "Beware the Beast from Below" as a radio DJ for the K-Ghoul radio station. Her true identity is revealed to Velma and later the rest of the gang, causing them to distrust her. She sacrifices her life to save the gang from an explosion in "The Midnight Zone" episode.

In the rebooted timeline depicted in the series finale "Come Undone", Cassidy is married to Ricky Owens, and the two work together with Pericles at an environmentally-friendly version of Destroido called Creationex.

==== Professor Pericles ====
Professor Pericles (voiced by Udo Kier) is a sentient parrot and the mascot of the original Mystery Incorporated, first appearing in "Howl of the Fright Hound". Throughout the series, Pericles works to free his "master", the Evil Entity, in hopes of becoming all-powerful in exchange for releasing the Entity. Pericles succeeds in freeing the Entity when the Entity comes, and volunteers to serve as the Entity's physical host. However, Pericles learns to his horror too late that he has to die for the Entity to take over. Pericles' body is disfigured and remolded to serve as the Evil Entity's form until its defeat. In the rebooted timeline depicted in the series finale "Come Undone", Pericles is the mascot of Creationex.

==== Brad Chiles and Judy Reeves ====
Bradley "Brad" Chiles and Judy Reeves (voiced by Tim Matheson and Tia Carrere as adults, Nolan North and Kari Wahlgren as young adults) are members of the original Mystery Incorporated and the birth parents of Fred Jr. When Fred Jones Sr. abducts Fred to keep Brad and Judy from returning to Crystal Cove, the two continue to live their lives under secret identities as the Sternums, a couple who invent traps and help mystery solvers.

In the rebooted timeline depicted in the series finale "Come Undone", the two are obstetricians who were never separated from Fred.

==== Kriegstaffebots ====
The Kriegstaffebots (voiced by Dee Bradley Baker) are the robotic minions of Professor Pericles that have a World War II-themed design to them.

=== Nova ===
Nova (vocal effects provided by Jennifer Hale, speaking voice provided by Amy Acker) is Brad and Judy's pet Cocker Spaniel that Scooby-Doo is infatuated with. She is placed in a coma in "The Horrible Herd", later being possessed by the Anunnaki, who warn Mystery Inc. of the Evil Entity. In the rebooted timeline depicted in the series finale "Come Undone", Nova is still possessed by the Anunnaki and thanks Scooby for his heroic actions.

=== The Evil Entity ===
The Evil Entity (voiced by Clancy Brown) is an evil Anunnaki who was imprisoned in a crystal sarcophagus buried beneath Crystal Cove by his own kind. He came to Earth thousands of years ago during Nibiru, which weakened the barriers between dimensions and allowed him to cross over. Unlike the rest of his kind, who seek to help mankind evolve, he desires for destruction. His influence causes most of the series' events. Professor Pericles eventually frees the Entity before Mystery Inc. destroys him, creating a new timeline free of his influence.

== Introduced in Scoob! ==
=== Brian Crown / Blue Falcon ===
Brian Crown (voiced by Mark Wahlberg) is the son of Radley Crown/Blue Falcon.

=== Dick Dastardly and Muttley ===
Dick Dastardly (voiced by Jason Isaacs) is a supervillain who wanted to free his dog Muttley from the Underworld, getting rich in the process.

The Dick Dastardly disguise of:

- Simon Cowell (voiced by Simon Cowell) is a British television personality, entrepreneur, producer and record executive. He is Mystery Inc.'s first investor. When apprehended, Dastardly tried to fool Mystery Inc. and their allies that Dastardly was the alias of Cowell only for Velma not to be fooled.
- Officer Jaffe (voiced by Christina Hendricks) is a police officer.
- Fred Jones (voiced by Zac Efron) who tried to trick Shaggy.

Muttley (voiced by Billy West / Don Messick) is an anthropomorphic dog and the sidekick/henchdog of supervillain Dick Dastardly

=== Rotten Robots ===
Rotten Robots (voiced by Vanara Taing) are robots that formerly served as minions to the supervillain Dick Dastardly, replacing for Muttley whom was lost in the Underworld. They teamed up with Shaggy Rogers and Scooby-Doo to fight Cerberus.

The Rotten Robots consist of:

- Dusty is one of Dick Dastardly's Rotten minions until he turned against his leader.

== Introduced in Trick or Treat Scooby-Doo! ==
=== Coco Diablo ===
Coco Diablo (voiced by Myrna Velasco) is a costume designer who designed disguises for many of the villains Mystery Inc. has faced in the past. She is a parody of French fashion designer Coco Chanel. Velma has a crush on Diablo, making it the first time the character has been explicitly portrayed as a lesbian or bisexual. Velma was previously implied to be in a relationship with Marcie Fleach in Mystery Incorporated and was "explicitly gay" in the initial script for Scooby-Doo.

== Introduced in Velma ==
=== Sophie ===
Sophie (voiced by Melissa Fumero) is Aman's girlfriend and the owner of Spooner's Malt Shop. She becomes an important figure in Velma's life and later gives birth to her daughter, Amanda.

=== Dandruff Tuba ===
Dandruff Tuba (voiced by "Weird Al" Yankovic) is a student at Crystal Cove High who frequently becomes the unfortunate victim of accidents and collateral damage resulting from the gang's adventures.

=== Olive ===
Olive (voiced by Fortune Feimster) is one of the school's most popular students and a recurring member of Crystal Cove High's social scene.

=== Gigi ===
Gigi (voiced by Yvonne Orji in the first season and Andia Winslow in the second) is a confident and fashionable student who occupies a prominent place within the school's social hierarchy.

=== Jacques Beau (Jock Bo) ===
Jock Bo (voiced by Karl-Anthony Towns) is a handsome and athletic student whose popularity makes him one of Crystal Cove High's most recognizable figures.

=== Brenda ===
Brenda (voiced by Shay Mitchell) is a popular student whose murder becomes the central mystery of the series' first season.

=== Krista ===
Krista (voiced by Debby Ryan) is one of several victims connected to the mysterious crimes occurring in Crystal Cove.

=== Lola ===
Lola (voiced by Kulap Vilaysack) is another victim tied to the string of attacks targeting popular girls in the town.

=== Mayor Dave ===
Mayor Dave (voiced by Jim Rash) is the self-proclaimed "cool mayor" of Crystal Cove whose desire to maintain the town's image often outweighs his competence.

=== Sheriff Cogburn ===
Sheriff Cogburn (voiced by Stephen Root) is Crystal Cove's bumbling sheriff, whose lack of effectiveness frequently hinders rather than helps criminal investigations.

=== Amber ===
Amber (voiced by Sara Ramirez) is Thorn's non-binary child, who inherits their parent's gothic aesthetic and outlook.

== Minor characters ==
=== Family Members ===
==== Dada and Mumsy-Doo ====
Scooby's father and mother, first introduced in The New Scooby and Scrappy Doo Show. They later appeared in The New Scooby-Doo Mysteries, The 13 Ghosts of Scooby-Doo, and A Pup Named Scooby-Doo, and were voiced by Don Messick and Frank Welker.

In addition to Scooby, they had several other children; Ruby, Skippy, Howdy, and Yabba-Doo.

==== Colton and Paula Rogers ====
Shaggy's unnamed father and mother were first introduced in The New Scooby and Scrappy Doo Show.

Their younger versions later appeared in A Pup Named Scooby-Doo. In this version, Shaggy's father is a police officer and his mother is a socialite. In addition to Shaggy, they had a daughter named Maggie, also known as Suggie.

In the Scooby-Doo! Mystery Incorporated continuity, Shaggy's father and mother were named Colton and Paula Rogers.

In the Velma series, Shaggy's father and mother were named Lamont and Blythe Rogers (voiced by Gary Cole and Nicole Byer). Lamont is a therapist who also works as Crystal Cove High's school counselor and Blythe is the principal of the school. In this version, Shaggy's mother is an African-American woman while his father is white and bears a resemblance to Shaggy's original design.

- Mrs. Rogers is voiced by B.J. Ward (in the original series), Grey Griffin (in Scooby-Doo! Mystery Inc) and Pam Coats (in Scoob!)
- Mr. Rogers is voiced by Casey Kasem in both versions. Kasem also voiced other versions of Shaggy in the franchise.

==== Edna Perdue ====
Edna Perdue (voiced by Vanessa Williams) is a respected neuroscientist and researcher specializing in the human brain, as well as Norville's maternal grandmother.

==== Dale and Angie Dinkley ====
Velma's unnamed father and mother were first introduced in A Pup Named Scooby-Doo. In addition to Velma, they had a daughter named Madelyn (introduced in Scooby-Doo! Abracadabra-Doo).

In the Scooby-Doo! Mystery Incorporated continuity, Velma's father and mother were named Dale and Angie Dinkley. They own the Crystal Cove Spook Museum.

In the Scooby Apocalypse comics, Angie and Dale had five children; Velma, Hugo, Cheeves, Quentin, and Rufus.

In the Velma series, Velma's father and mother were named Aman and Diya Dinkley (voiced by Russell Peters and Sarayu Blue). Aman is a lawyer who struggles to keep Velma in line while Diya is an alcoholic who used to write mysteries, inspiring Velma's passion, until her disappearance.

- Mrs. Dinkley is voiced by B.J. Ward (in A Pup Named Scooby-Doo) and Frances Conroy (in Scooby-Doo! Mystery Inc).
- Mr. Dinkley is voiced by Frank Welker (in A Pup Named Scooby-Doo) and Kevin Dunn (in Scooby-Doo! Mystery Inc).

==== Nedley and Elizabeth Blake ====
Nedley and Elizabeth Blake are Daphne's father and mother.

They were first introduced in The New Scooby and Scrappy Doo Show, and their younger versions later appeared in A Pup Named Scooby-Doo. Nedley has had several different names over the years; in the Ottenheimer books, he was called Jonathan, and in the first segment of Cartoon Network's Scooby-Doo: Behind the Scenes, he was called George R. Blake.

In the Scooby-Doo! Mystery Incorporated continuity, Daphne's father and mother were named Barty and Nan Blake (voiced by Frank Welker and Kath Soucie). In addition to Daphne, they had several other daughters; Daisy, Dawn, Dorothy, and Delilah. The Blake clan is a rich and influential family in Crystal Cove, even having a building at Darrow University named after them. According to Daphne in some episodes, her parents are mentally unstable.

In the film Daphne & Velma, Nedley and Elizabeth were portrayed by Brian Stepanek and Nadine Ellis. In this version, Daphne's mother is an African-American woman.

In the Velma series, Daphne's adoptive mothers were Donna and Linda Blake (voiced by Jane Lynch and Wanda Sykes) while her biological father and mother were Carroll and Darren (voiced by Ming-Na Wen and Ken Leung). Donna and Linda are two slightly incompetent detectives who began investigating Brenda's death, and Caroll and Darren are two Asian criminals members of the Crystal Cove Gang.

==== Skip and Peggy Jones ====
Skip and Peggy Jones are Fred's father and mother, first introduced in the film Scooby-Doo! Pirates Ahoy! (voiced by Tim Conway and Edie McClurg). Skip has also a brother named Eddie (voiced by Frank Welker) who appeared in one episode of A Pup Named Scooby-Doo.

In the Scooby-Doo! Mystery Incorporated continuity, Fred's foster father was Mayor Fred Jones Sr. (voiced by Gary Cole), while Fred's real father and mother were Brad Chiles and Judy Reeves (voiced by Tim Matheson and Tia Carrere as adults and Nolan North and Kari Wahlgren as young adults).

In the Be Cool, Scooby-Doo continuity, Fred's father was Donald Jones (voiced by Dee Bradley Baker), a computer engineer who operated as the criminal known as Professor Huh?.

In the Velma series, Fred's father and mother were named William and Victoria Jones (voiced by Frank Welker and Cherry Jones). They own the Jones Gentlemen's Accessories. Victoria is the daughter of Harry Meeting, the general and the creator of Project SCOOBI, which can transfer people's brains to other bodies. Fearing that Fred would not be able to inherit the family company due to his childishness, Victoria hypnotized William and decided to start killing people in Crystal Cove and stealing their brains to replace Fred's. Eventually, she revealed herself to the gang and ended up dying in the caves, being crushed by a stalactite.

==== Maggie Rogers ====
Maggie Rogers (voiced by B. J. Ward) was first introduced in The New Scooby and Scrappy Doo Show. She is Shaggy's younger sister and the wife of Wilfred.

Her baby version later appeared in A Pup Named Scooby-Doo, where she was nicknamed Sugie (also voiced by B. J. Ward).

== Recurring antagonists ==
=== 10,000 Volt Ghost ===
The 10,000 Volt Ghost is an electrokinetic ghost.

In The Scooby-Doo Show, the 10,000 Volt Ghost (vocal effects provided by John Stephenson) was said to be the result of a Winterhaven electrician named Mr. Voltner who died in an accident when repairing an electrical tower. Mystery Inc. caught the 10,000 Volt Ghost and exposed it to be a still-alive Voltner who was collaborating with Mayor Dudley to scare its inhabitants away so that they can buy the land cheap and allow a highway to pass through it.

In Scooby-Doo Unmasked!, the 10,000 Volt Ghost (voiced by Chris Edgerly) is a minor antagonist and was depicted as an animatronic.

In Scooby-Doo 2: Monsters Unleashed, the Evil Masked Figure had the costume of the 10,000 Volt Ghost stolen from the Coolsonian by the Pterodactyl Ghost and the 10,000 Volt Ghost (voiced by Terrence Stone) was brought to life. Daphne later used jumper cables to take out the 10,000 Volt Ghost and the Black Knight Ghost.

In Trick or Treat Scooby-Doo, the 10,000 Volt Ghost (vocal effects provided by Kevin Michael Richardson) was featured. The special costume used was revealed to have been created by criminal fashion designer Coco Diablo.

=== Black Knight Ghost ===
The Black Knight is a living black knight armor.

In Scooby-Doo: Where Are You!, the Black Knight (vocal effects provided by John Stephenson) was the disguise of the curator Mr. Wickles (voiced by Don Messick) to scare people away from his forgery activities.

In Scooby 2: Monsters Unleashed, the Black Knight was called the Black Knight Ghost and the disguise of Jeremiah Wickles (portrayed by Peter Boyle) who was just released from prison. Its costume was stolen by the Pterodactyl Ghost from the Coolsonian alongside the 10,000 Volt Ghost's costume and brought to life. The Black Knight Ghost (voiced by Bob Papenbrook) ambushed Mystery Inc. in Wickles' house. Daphne later used jumper cables to take out the 10,000 Volt Ghost and the Black Knight Ghost. Once that was done, the Black Knight Ghost's helmet rolled across the ground and quoted "Oh crap".

In Trick or Treat Scooby-Doo, Mr. Wickles (voiced by Dee Bradley Baker) was shown to still be in prison after Mystery Inc. thwarted his forgery activities. His Black Knight costume was revealed to have been created by criminal fashion designer Coco Diablo.

=== Captain Cutler ===
Captain Cutler is a sea captain.

In Scooby-Doo: Where Are You!, Captain Cutler faked his death and used an atmospheric diving suit covered in phosphorescent glowing seaweed to pose as his own ghost to steal ships with his wife secretly helping him.

In Scooby-Doo 2: Monsters Unleashed, Captain Cutler's atmospheric diving suit was later stolen from the Coolsonian by the 10,000 Volt Ghost and the Black Knight Ghost. When it was accidentally brought to life alongside the other monsters by Shaggy and Scooby-Doo, Captain Cutler's Ghost (portrayed by James Bamford) attacked them.

In Be Cool, Scooby-Doo, Captain Cutler's atmospheric diving suit was used for the character Dr. Cutler (voiced by Matthew Lillard in "Game of Chicken", Jeff Bennett in "The Curse of Half-Beard's Booty").

Captain Cutler appeared in Trick or Treat Scooby-Doo, voiced by Matthew Lillard. He was shown to still be in prison after Mystery Inc. thwarted his yacht theft. Captain Cutler's atmospheric diving suit was revealed to have been created by criminal fashion designer Coco Diablo.

=== Charlie the Robot ===
Charlie the Robot is a robot.

In Scooby-Doo, Where Are You!, Charlie the Robot was a robot built by Mr. Jenkins to help him run Funland. His sister Sarah sabotaged Charlie because she didn't feel comfortable with robots around children. Following a mishap with the magnet which Sarah also sabotaged, Charlie crashed. With Sarah being right about her claim, Mr. Jenkins decided to rebuild Charlie with a sense of emotion and call it Charlie the Second.

In Scooby-Doo! Mystery Incorporated, Charlie's history was intact and he was later donated to the Crystal Cove Museum. Mystery Inc. used Charlie to pose as Krampus (voiced by Carlos Alazraqui). This was part of Mystery Inc.'s plan to fool the original Mystery Inc. into stealing the fake Planospheric Disk.

In the Scooby-Doo and Guess Who? episode "A Haunt of a Thousand Voices", Charlie the Robot was the disguise of Frank Welker.

Charlie the Robot later appeared in the Jellystone! episodes "Disco Fever" and "Girl, You My Friend".

=== The Creeper ===
The Creeper was a green-skinned hunchbacked man.

In Scooby-Doo, Where Are You!, the Creeper (voiced by John Stephenson) was the disguise of the bank president Mr. Carswell (voiced by Casey Kasem) who used the disguise to cover up his bank robberies.

In the Scooby-Doo and Guess Who? episode "A Haunt of a Thousand Voices", the Creeper (voiced by Dee Bradley Baker) was the disguise of Kate Micucci.

=== Ghost Clown ===
The Ghost Clown is the ghost of a clown.

In Scooby-Doo, Where Are You!, the Ghost Clown (voiced by Barry Richards) was the disguise of Harry the Hypnotist who planned revenge against the circus he worked at when they caught him robbing the money they earned.

In Scooby-Doo 2: Monsters Unleashed, the Ghost Clown's costume was on display at the Coolsonian.

In Trick or Treat Scooby-Doo, Harry the Hypnotist (voiced by David Lodge) was shown to still be in prison after Mystery Inc. thwarted his forgery activities. His Ghost Clown costume was revealed to have been created by criminal fashion designer Coco Diablo.

=== Ghost of Elias Kingston ===
The Ghost of Elias Kingston was the ghost of a known man.

In Scooby-Doo, Where Are You!, the Ghost of Elias Kingston (voiced by John Stephenson) was the disguise of Stuart Wetherby (also voiced by John Stephenson).

In Be Cool, Scooby-Doo, Elias Kingston was the founder of Kingston University. The Ghost of Elias Kingston (voiced by Frank Welker) was the disguise of the gas station attendant Mitchell Simons (voiced by Chord Overdstreet) who plotted revenge on Kingston University for not admitting him and was assisted by father Joe Simons (voiced by Tom Kenny) who was the head of security at Kingston University.

=== Ghost of Redbeard ===
The Ghost of Redbeard is a pirate ghost.

In Scooby-Doo, Where Are You!, the Ghost of Redbeard (voiced by John Stephens) was the disguise of shipping magnate C.L. Magnus who stole his own cargoship for insurance when his business was failing. He was aided by two unnamed henchmen who posed as crew members.

In Scooby-Doo! Frankencreepy, C.L. Magnus (voiced by Dee Bradley Baker) collaborated with three other villains for revenge on Mystery Inc. where he posed as the burgomaster Mr. Burger.

In the Scooby-Doo and Guess Who? episode "A Haunt of a Thousand Voices", the Ghost of Redbeard (voiced by Dee Bradley Baker) was the disguise of Matthew Lillard.

=== Green Ghosts ===
The Green Ghosts (also called Phantom Shadows) are two ghosts that wear chains.

In the Scooby-Doo, Where Are You! episode "A Night of Fright is No Delight", the Green Ghosts (voiced by Hal Smith) are the diguises of the lawyers Cosgood Creeps (voiced by Hal Smith) and Cuthbert Crawls in a plot to target the late Colonel Sanders' money which turned out to be the Confederate type that is now useless.

In Scooby-Doo! Frankencreepy, Cuthberg Crawls (voiced by Kevin Michael Richardson) collaborated with three other villains for revenge on Mystery Inc. where he posed as Inspector Krunch.

In the Supernatural episode "Scoobynatural", only Cosgood Creeps (voiced by Stephen Stanton) appeared when Dean Winchester, Sam Winchester, and later Castiel were brought into the television that was showing "A Night of Fright is No Delight" by a ghost boy. Because of the ghost boy, it appeared the real Green Ghost who killed Creeps. By the time the Winchesters and Castiel learned about the ghost boy being used, they had him pose as Creeps to fool Mystery Inc. that the ghost was a fake alongside the bodies of the victims that were killed.

In Trick or Treat Scooby-Doo, Creeps and Crawls were shown to still be in prison after Mystery Inc. thwarted their plot.

=== Miner Forty-Niner ===
The Miner Forty-Niner is the ghost of a miner.

In Scooby-Doo, Where Are You!, the Miner Forty-Niner (voiced by Casey Kasem) was the disguise of the property caretaker Hank (voiced by Don Messick) who plotted to scare the people of the Gold City Guest Ranch away and claim the oil underneath.

In Scooby-Doo 2: Monsters Unleashed, the Miner Forty-Niner's costume was stolen by the 10,000 Volt Ghost and the Black Knight Ghost where the Miner Forty-Niner (portrayed by C. Ernst Harth) was among the monsters that were accidentally brought to life by Shaggy and Scooby-Doo. Unlike the animated version, the Miner Forty-Niner breathed fire.

In Trick or Treat Scooby-Doo, Hank (voiced by Jeff Bennett) was shown to still be in prison after Mystery Inc. thwarted his plot.

=== Pterodactyl Ghost ===
The Pterodactyl Ghost is a ghost of an evolved pterodactyl.

In The Scooby-Doo Show, the Pterodactyl Ghost (vocal effects provided by Casey Kasem) was the disguise of a catering truck owner named Johnny used to cover up his role as a pawn in a music pirating scheme masterminded by the Big Canyon Dude Ranch's manager Mr. Bohannon (voiced by John Stephenson)

In Scooby-Doo 2: Monsters Unleashed, the Pterodactyl Ghost (vocal effects provided by Dee Bradley Baker) had a more Pteranodon-like head and was the disguise of the mad scientist Jonathan Jacobo (portrayed by Tim Blake Nelson) who wanted to bring monsters to life. After being assumed dead after a failed prison escape involving artificial wings, Jacobo finally got his plot to work starting with turning his Pterodactyl Ghost costume into a real monster. While additionally posing as journalist Heather Jasper Howe (portrayed by Alicia Silverstone) and operating as an Evil Masked Figure (voice provided by Scott McNeil), he went around stealing the monster costumes of the other villains with help from the Pterodactyl Ghost and discrediting Mystery Inc. During the final showdown, the Pterodactyl Ghost accidentally collided with the Tar Monster. After the monsters were restored to normal, Jacobo was exposed and brought back to justice.

=== Skeleton Men ===
The Skeleton Men were cycloptic and skeletal extraterrestrials.

In The Scooby-Doo Show, the Skeleton Men were the disguises of the head of the Weather Eye project named Doctor Grimsley (voiced by Don Messick) and his unnamed henchmen duo.

In Scooby-Doo 2: Monsters Unleashed, only two of the Skeleton Men were seen where they were brought to life by the Evil Masked Figure. The pair were differentiated from each other by their eye colors – red (vocal effects provided by Dee Bradley Baker) and green (vocal effects provided by Wally Wingert).

=== Spooky Space Kook ===
The Spooky Space Kook is an undead astronaut.

In Scooby-Doo, Where Are You!, the Spooky Space Kook (vocal effects provided by Don Messick) was the disguise of Henry Bascomb (also voiced by Don Messick) who was the next door neighbor of an unnamed farmer. He wanted to scare the people away from the local air force and buy the land for little to no money.

In Trick or Treat Scooby-Doo, Henry Bascomb (voiced by Kevin Michael Richardson) was shown to still be in prison after Mystery Inc. thwarted his plot.

=== Tar Monster ===
The Tar Monster is a one-eyed monster made of tar.

In The Scooby-Doo Show, the Tar Monster (vocal effects provided by Michael Bell) was said to be the guardian of the lost city of Byzantius. It was the disguise of Professor Brixton's assistant Mr. Stoner to scare the people away so that he can have the treasure for himself.

In Scooby-Doo and the Cyber Chase, the Tar Monster was among the monsters that appeared in the last level of Eric Staufer's video game.

In Scooby-Doo 2: Monsters Unleashed, the Tar Monster's costume was stolen by the 10,000 Volt Ghost and the Black Knight Ghost where the Tar Monster (voiced by Michael Sorich) was among the monsters that were accidentally brought to life by Shaggy and Scooby-Doo.

== Fictional monsters adapted for this franchise ==
=== Count Dracula ===
Count Dracula is a known vampire.

In the Scooby-Doo, Where Are You! episode "A Gaggle of Galloping Ghosts", Count Dracula (voiced by John Stephenson) was one of the disguises of Big Bob Oakley.

In The New Scooby and Scrappy-Doo Show episode "Who's Minding the Monster", Count Dracula (voiced again by John Stephenson) and his wife hire Shaggy, Scooby-Doo, Scrappy-Doo, and Daphne to babysit their child. In A Halloween Hassle at Dracula's Castle, Count Dracula (voiced by Frank Welker) held a Halloween party for his fellow monsters which was nearly ruined by Chandra the Mystic and the Ghost of Van Helsing.

In Scooby-Doo and the Ghoul School, Count Dracula (voiced by Zane Kessler) is shown as the father of Sibella.

In Scooby-Doo and the Reluctant Werewolf, Count Dracula (voiced by Hamilton Camp) is the main antagonist where he uses a spell to transform Shaggy into a werewolf to compete in the annual Monster Road Rally after the werewolf that usually does it has retired.

=== Frankenstein's monster ===
Frankenstein's monster is a simulacrum.

In the Scooby-Doo, Where Are You! episode "A Gaggle of Galloping Ghosts", Frankenstein's monster was one of the disguises of Big Bob Oakley (voiced by John Stephenson).

In The New Scooby and Scrappy-Doo Show episode "Who's Minding the Monster", Frankenstein's monster (voiced again by John Stephenson) is a minion of Count Dracula. In A Halloween Hassle at Dracula's Castle, Frankenstein's monster (voiced by Don Messick) attended Count Dracula's Halloween party.

In Scooby-Doo and the Ghoul School, Frankenstein's monster (voiced by Zane Kessler) appears as Frankenteen Sr' who is the father of Elsa Frankenteen.

In Scooby-Doo and the Reluctant Werewolf, Frankenstein's monster (voiced by Jim Cummings) appears as one of the monsters partaking in the Monster Road Rally.

== Recurring guest stars ==
- Batman and other DC Comics characters are recurring guest stars in Scooby-Doo media.
- The rock band Kiss have appeared in A Scooby-Doo Halloween and Scooby-Doo! and Kiss: Rock and Roll Mystery.
- WWE wrestlers have appeared in Scooby-Doo! WrestleMania Mystery and Scooby-Doo! and WWE: Curse of the Speed Demon.
- Elvira, Mistress of the Dark has appeared in Scooby-Doo! Return to Zombie Island and Happy Halloween, Scooby-Doo!.
- Cher, Don Knotts, and the Harlem Globetrotters have all appeared more than once.
- Hanna-Barbera characters often crossover with Scooby-Doo, with characters like Dynomutt and Blue Falcon appearing frequently.
