= Chill Out, Scooby-Doo! =

- DVD cover
- Directed by: Joe Sichta
- Written by: Adam Scheinman; Joe Sichta
- Based on: Characters by Hanna-Barbera Productions; Shangri-La by James Hilton
- Produced by: Margaret M. Dean; Joe Sichta
- Starring: Frank Welker; Casey Kasem; Mindy Cohn; Grey DeLisle; René Auberjonois; James Hong; Jeff Bennett; Kim Mai Guest; James Sie; Alfred Molina
- Edited by: Joe Gall
- Music by: Thomas Chase Jones
- Production company: Warner Bros. Animation
- Distributed by: Warner Home Video
- Release date: September 4, 2007
- Running time: 73 minutes
- Country: United States
- Language: English

Chill Out, Scooby-Doo! is a 2007 American animated comedy mystery film, and the eleventh in the Scooby-Doo direct-to-video film series, produced by Warner Bros. Animation. It was released to DVD on September 4, 2007. The film is dedicated to Iwao Takamoto, a character designer for Hanna-Barbera who died on January 8, 8 months before the film's home video release. This was also the final Scooby-Doo! movie that Joseph Barbera worked on before his death on December 18, 2006.

== Plot ==
College professor Jeffries tasks a Sherpa guide named Pemba with helping him in his quest to find Shangri-La. However, Pemba soon grows reluctant to continue for fear of intruding in the Yeti's territory. An undeterred Jeffries continues alone, but both are attacked by the monster.

Meanwhile, Fred Jones, Daphne Blake, and Velma Dinkley of Mystery Inc. try to enjoy their vacation in Paris until they realize their friends Shaggy Rogers and Scooby-Doo are late. Concurrently, the pair accidentally catch the wrong plane and end up traveling to the Himalayas with French-Canadian hunter and trapper, Alphonse LaFleur, who seeks to kill the Yeti and forcibly recruits the pair as bait. Shaggy temporarily manages to call Fred before losing signal. Using his phone's GPS system, Fred discovers Shaggy and Scooby's location and leads the girls in traveling to the Himalayas to rescue them.

Elsewhere, Shaggy, Scooby, and LaFleur reach a small, nearly abandoned mountain village, where they encounter Jeffries and Pemba, who recently escaped the Yeti. Hoping to find a phone, Shaggy and Scooby seek out the High Lama, who tells them of a nearby weather station and shows them a large crystal that he believes protects the village from the Yeti's wrath. Overhearing the latter point, Jeffries grows interested in the crystal. Before heading out for the station, Pemba, Jeffries, LaFleur, Shaggy, and Scooby are met and joined by Pemba's sister Minga, who warns them of an approaching snowstorm.

Along their journey, Pemba reveals the station's owner moonlights as a radio DJ before realizing Minga has a crush on the latter and joined the group to meet him. As the storm rolls in, the group make camp for the night, but Jeffries secretly leaves with explosives before the Yeti attacks Shaggy and Scooby. LaFleur tries to capture it, but his plan backfires while the pair get lost evading the Yeti. They are soon rescued by Del Chillman, an acquaintance and amateur cryptozoologist they met at Loch Ness, (Note: As depicted in Scooby-Doo! and the Loch Ness Monster) and taken to the station, where Chillman now works.

Simultaneously, the rest of Mystery Inc. reach the village their friends were at and follow their tracks up the mountain. They find Pemba, but no sign of Minga or Jeffries. As they split up to find everyone, Chillman leaves Shaggy and Scooby to do the same. However, the pair are attacked once more by the Yeti. LaFleur returns to rescue the pair, but falls off a cliff to his apparent death. While escaping, Shaggy and Scooby temporarily stumble onto Shangri-La until the Yeti attacks them a third time.

Chillman soon finds the rest of Mystery Inc. and Pemba, but later discovers his station was destroyed and several helium tanks were stolen. The group eventually reunite with Shaggy and Scooby in an old mine, where they find Jeffries mining for crystals like the one from the village. Upon capturing him, they accuse him of being the monster, but he denies it before the Yeti attacks the group, forcing them to flee. Jeffries frees himself and attempts to take the crystals he mined. However, he gets caught in a trap Mystery Inc. set up to capture the monster before one of his explosives causes an avalanche. After the monster rescues Velma and Chillman, the group learn Minga had disguised herself as the Yeti to keep Chillman from ending his radio show and confess her feelings for him. Additionally, she stole the helium tanks to better facilitate her traversal up and down the mountain.

Afterward, Jeffries is arrested for his illegal mining operation; LaFleur is rescued and safely returned to the village by a mysterious entity; and Chillman and Minga enter a relationship before joining Mystery Inc. in attempting to return to Paris, only to learn Fred ended up in the Amazon and leave to retrieve him.

== Voice cast ==
- Frank Welker as Scooby-Doo and Fred Jones
- Casey Kasem as Shaggy Rogers
- Mindy Cohn as Velma Dinkley
- Grey DeLisle as Daphne Blake
- James Sie as Pemba Sherpa
- Jeff Bennett as Del Chillman and Pilot
- René Auberjonois as Alphonse LaFleur
- Alfred Molina as Professor Jeffries
- Kim Mai Guest as Minga Sherpa
- James Hong as The High Lama
