= Happy Halloween, Scooby-Doo! =

2020 film by Maxwell Atoms

- DVD cover
- Directed by: Maxwell Atoms
- Written by: Maxwell Atoms
- Based on: Scooby-Doo by Hanna-Barbera Productions and DC Comics
- Produced by: Maxwell Atoms
- Starring: Frank Welker; Grey Griffin; Matthew Lillard; Kate Micucci; Cassandra Peterson; Bill Nye; Dwight Schultz
- Edited by: Michael Mangan
- Music by: Steve Rucker; Robert J. Kral (additional music)
- Production companies: Warner Bros. Animation; DC Entertainment
- Distributed by: Warner Bros. Home Entertainment
- Release date: October 6, 2020
- Running time: 80 minutes
- Country: United States
- Language: English

Happy Halloween, Scooby-Doo! is a 2020 American animated direct-to-DVD comedy horror film, and the thirty-fourth entry in the direct-to-video series of Scooby-Doo films. It was released on October 6, 2020, by Warner Bros. Home Entertainment.

== Plot ==
The Mystery Inc. gang are in a covert operation in Elvira's Halloween of Horrors Parade in Crystal Cove to capture the Haunted Scarecrow. The gang unmasks the Haunted Scarecrow as Dr. Jonathan Crane, also known as the Scarecrow, a former escaped convict of Arkham Asylum. While Velma explains how she solved the mystery by tracing a piece of fan mail sent to Elvira by Crane and measuring gas leakage in the air, gas drones carrying fear gas canisters set up by Crane appear in the sky. Scooby-Doo and Shaggy shoot down the drones by using Halloween candies as projectiles. Before being taken away by the federal agents, Dr. Crane tells Velma that his drones did not leak, suggesting that she missed something in her reasoning.

The gang finds that the Mystery Machine was severely damaged while chasing Dr. Crane and Fred is visibly upset. Meanwhile, Scooby and Shaggy go trick-or-treating as they think the mystery is solved. On the way, they come across a stray disabled drone in a pumpkin patch with "Tot Alli Frame" engraved on it and a truck full of toxic waste. The pumpkins coming in contact with the mixture of toxic waste and Dr. Crane's fear formula turn to animated monsters. Smaller pumpkins start flying and chasing Scooby and Shaggy. They quickly return to town and interrupt an ongoing interview of the other Mystery Inc. gang members to inform them about the Jackal Lanterns of the pumpkin patch. However, nobody believes them.

Fred and Velma are approached by Bill Nye, who gifts them a modernized vehicle called Mystery Machine X, though Fred prefers the original Mystery Machine. The Jackal Lanterns invade the town and take a female reporter with them. As Fred and Velma reach her, they see her being eaten and spit out by the Jackal Lanterns' giant master to become another monster herself. The Jackal Lanterns start chasing everybody, resulting in a long car chase. The gang becomes separated into three groups: Fred, Velma, and Bill Nye in Mystery Machine X, Daphne and Elvira in Elvira's car, and Shaggy and Scooby with a father–daughter duo named Mike and Michelle. They come across the Sheriff, who is devoured by the Giant Jackal Lantern, who is riding on the original Mystery Machine. Velma frees Dr. Crane from the federal agents' truck, but he too is apparently eaten by the Giant Jackal Lantern. This results in the Mystery Machine being destroyed, much to Fred's depression.

The Mystery Inc. gang comes together with Elvira, Mike, and Michelle and eats Scooby Snacks to enter Velma's "mind palace", an imaginary plane where they recount the night's events. Velma takes a leap of faith where she enters the Giant Jackal Lantern's mouth and comes out unharmed. As it turns out, the Giant Jackal Lantern is actually just a machine and everyone who was eaten is safe inside. The rest of the Jackal Lanterns are revealed to be drones, though both the Sheriff and Dr. Crane are missing. The drone engraving found by Scooby and Shaggy is revealed to be "T.O.T. Aluminum Lithium Frame".

The culprit is eventually revealed to be Toe Omnitech head Cutler Toe, whose criminal actions were exposed by Mystery Inc. in the past, and after being released from jail has been pretending to be the Sheriff as part of a revenge plot against them while also going after the lithium mine under Crystal Cove. Velma and Daphne uncover his location by trailing a hologram of the Jackal Lanterns and help the federal agents find his car. However, the escaped Scarecrow, as revenge for Toe attempting to frame him for the Jackal Lantern attacks, had found Toe first and no trace of either man is found. With the mystery solved and the gang being invited to another roadside Halloween celebration, Elvira delivers a monologue before breaking the fourth wall by revealing a spidery face behind her regular face in an ode to Halloween.

During the credits, the gang and Bill Nye help Fred rebuild the Mystery Machine.

== Voice cast ==
- Frank Welker as Scooby-Doo, Fred Jones
- Grey Griffin as Daphne Blake
- Matthew Lillard as Shaggy Rogers
- Kate Micucci as Velma Dinkley
- Cassandra Peterson as Elvira, Mistress of the Dark
- Bill Nye as himself
- Dwight Schultz as Dr. Jonathan Crane/The Scarecrow
- Kamali Minter as Michelle
- Bumper Robinson as Mike
- Roger Craig Smith as autopilot, parent
- Fred Tatasciore as Alpha Jackal Lantern, Federal Agent Malarkey
- David Herman as Sheriff/Cutler Toe

== Production ==
On July 5, 2020, Syfy announced the film with the debut of a trailer. It was directed by Maxwell Atoms (and therefore includes a style of humor similar to that of The Grim Adventures of Billy & Mandy) with Sam Register as producer.

== Reception ==
On Common Sense Media, Brian Costello rated it 3/5 stars, and wrote, "creepy but silly holiday tale has cartoon violence, peril."

== See also ==
- List of films set around Halloween
