= Scooby-Doo! Mystery Incorporated =

American animated television series

- Promotional poster
- Also known as: Mystery Incorporated; Scooby-Doo! Mystery, Inc.
- Genre: Mystery; Comedy drama; Comedy horror
- Based on: Characters by Hanna-Barbera Productions
- Developed by: Mitch Watson; Spike Brandt and Tony Cervone
- Written by: Mitch Watson (season 1); Michael F. Ryan (season 2)
- Directed by: Victor Cook; Curt Geda; Lauren Montgomery; Doug Murphy; Michael Goguen; Collette Sunderman (voice director)
- Voices of: Mindy Cohn; Grey DeLisle; Matthew Lillard; Frank Welker
- Theme music composer: Matthew Sweet
- Composer: Robert J. Kral
- Country of origin: United States
- Original language: English
- No. of seasons: 2
- No. of episodes: 52 (list of episodes)

Production
- Executive producer: Sam Register
- Producers: Mitch Watson; Victor Cook (season 2)
- Editor: Bruce King
- Running time: 22 minutes
- Production company: Warner Bros. Animation

Original release
- Network: Cartoon Network
- Release: April 5, 2010 – April 5, 2013

Related
- Shaggy & Scooby-Doo Get a Clue! (2006–08); Be Cool, Scooby-Doo! (2015–18)

Scooby-Doo! Mystery Incorporated (also known as Scooby-Doo! Mystery, Inc. or simply Mystery Incorporated) is an American animated horror comedy television series produced by Warner Bros. Animation for Cartoon Network. It is the eleventh incarnation of the Scooby-Doo media franchise created by Hanna-Barbera, and is the first not to traditionally air on Saturday mornings. The series was previewed on April 5, 2010, and premiered on July 12 later that year. It concluded on April 5, 2013, exactly three years from its debut, after two seasons and fifty-two episodes.

Mystery Incorporated revisits the early days of Scooby and the gang as they solve mysteries in their hometown, while also referencing previous incarnations of the franchise. The series takes a tongue-in-cheek approach to the classic Scooby-Doo formula, with increasingly outlandish technology, skills, and scenarios behind each villain's story, and a different spin on the famous "meddling kids" quote at the end of every episode. Contrasting this, however, are two elements previously unseen in a Scooby-Doo series: a serial format with an overarching story arc and plot points treated with full dramatic effect, as well as ongoing romantic and interpersonal drama between the characters. Additionally, it is the first series in the franchise to utilize real ghosts and monsters since The 13 Ghosts of Scooby-Doo.

The series homages and satirizes various horror works, includes films such as A Nightmare on Elm Street and Saw, television series such as Twin Peaks, and H. P. Lovecraft's Cthulhu Mythos. The story arc evolves in the second season to focus on Babylonian mythology, exploring the Anunnaki, the concept of Nibiru, and the writings of Zecharia Sitchin. Characters from throughout the Scooby-Doo franchise return, such as The Hex Girls and Vincent Van Ghoul from The 13 Ghosts of Scooby-Doo, along with guest appearances from Hanna-Barbera characters such as Captain Caveman, Jabberjaw, Speed Buggy, The Funky Phantom, and Blue Falcon and Dynomutt.

As with the franchise's previous three installments, Mystery Incorporated introduces redesigns for the main characters, this time in a retro look resembling their original 1969 incarnations. The series marks the animated debut of Matthew Lillard as the voice of Shaggy, after portraying the character in the live-action films Scooby-Doo (2002) and Scooby-Doo 2: Monsters Unleashed (2004). Shaggy's original voice actor, Casey Kasem, instead voiced Shaggy's father in five episodes without credit; it was his final performance before his death in 2014. Linda Cardellini, who played Velma in the live-action films, voiced the recurring character Hot Dog Water in the series.

== Plot ==
=== Season 1 ===
Fred Jones, Daphne Blake, Velma Dinkley, Norville "Shaggy" Rogers and Scooby-Doo are a team of teenage mystery solvers who live in the small town of Crystal Cove, the self-proclaimed "Most Hauntedest Place on Earth". The allegedly "cursed" town's long history of strange disappearances and ghost and monster sightings form the basis for its thriving tourist industry; as such, the adults of the town (chief among them being Fred's father Mayor Fred Jones Sr. and Sheriff Bronson Stone) are not happy that the kids are debunking all the supernatural goings-on that bring in so much revenue as the overwrought schemes of charlatans and criminals.

In addition to the traditional cases they always solve, the team finds itself being nudged into the uncovering of a dark secret that is hidden in the past of Crystal Cove. Following cryptic hints from a faceless mystery-man known only as "Mr. E." (a play on "mystery"), the gang unearths the legend of a cursed Conquistador treasure, the secret history of Crystal Cove's founding Darrow Family, and the mysterious, unsolved disappearance of four mystery-solving youths and their pet bird—the original Mystery Incorporated. Standing in the way of solving this mystery, however, there are the romantic entanglements pulling the kids apart: Shaggy finds himself unable to put his new romance with Velma ahead of his longtime friendship with Scooby, while Daphne pines for Fred, who is obsessed with building traps and obliviously struggles to realize that he shares her feelings, too.

=== Season 2 ===
The return of the original Mystery Incorporated to Crystal Cove begins a race between the two groups to locate the pieces of the enigmatic planispheric disk, which will point the way to the cursed treasure beneath the town. As the pieces are gathered, it becomes apparent that these two groups are not the only teams of mystery-solvers that have lived in Crystal Cove: many similar groups, always made up of four humans and an animal, have existed, and the secret behind their centuries-long connection will reveal the truth behind the curse of Crystal Cove. The fate of both the gang's friendship and all of reality itself hangs in the balance as extradimensional forces gather in preparation, and the time of Nibiru draws near.

== Episodes ==
Season	Episodes	Originally released	
Season	Episodes	First released	Last released
1	26	April 5, 2010	July 26, 2011
2	26	July 30, 2012	April 5, 2013

The first season of Scooby-Doo! Mystery Incorporated ran for twenty-six episodes between 2010 and 2011 with an unknown stop to the airing of the episodes after episode thirteen. The first episode of the season premiered as a sneak peek on April 5, 2010, and reaired on July 12, 2010 on Cartoon Network along with the next twelve episodes in the United States. The series continued to air on Canada's Teletoon after episode thirteen. The remaining thirteen episodes, dubbed as a second season by Cartoon Network, began airing on May 3, 2011 until July 26, 2011. During the hiatus the first episode of the second season premiered on March 30, 2012 on Cartoon Network Videos and aired on Boomerang in the UK on June 2, 2012 with four more episodes premiering until June 6, 2012. The official Warner Brothers website announced that the second season would begin airing on Cartoon Network in May 2012 but was set back to July 30, 2012 in the United States. The first fifteen episodes aired on weekdays after July 30, 2012, until August 17, 2012. The show went on another hiatus until March 25, 2013, when the remaining episodes of season two began to air in the United States and concluded on April 5, 2013.

Each episode of the series is called a "chapter" in line with the show's overarching story, numbered from 1 to 52 across both seasons.

== Voice cast ==
=== Main ===
- Frank Welker as Scooby-Doo, Fred Jones Jr.
- Mindy Cohn as Velma Dinkley
- Grey DeLisle as Daphne Blake
- Matthew Lillard as Norville "Shaggy" Rogers

=== Recurring ===
- Lewis Black as Mr. E (Ricky Owens)
- Linda Cardellini as Hot Dog Water (Marcie Fleach)
- Tia Carrere as Judy Reeves
- Gary Cole as Mayor Fred Jones Sr.
- Vivica A. Fox as Angel Dynamite (Cassidy Williams)
- Kate Higgins as Mayor Janet Nettles
- Udo Kier as Professor Pericles
- Tim Matheson as Brad Chiles
- Patrick Warburton as Sheriff Bronson Stone

== Home media ==
Prior to the volume releases the first episode in the series, "Beware the Beast from Below" was released as a bonus episode in the special features of Scooby-Doo! Camp Scare on September 14, 2010. "Menace of the Manticore" was also released as a bonus feature on Big Top Scooby-Doo! on October 9, 2012. Warner Home Video started releasing episodes to DVD on January 25, 2011 in the US. The first three volumes contain four episodes from the series each in order as they aired on Cartoon Network. The final volume (named as Crystal Cove Curse) contains the remaining fourteen episodes from the first season. The first thirteen episodes of the second season were released to DVD (which is entitled Danger in the Deep) on November 13, 2012, while the second half of season two (titled Spooky Stampede) was released on June 18, 2013. Warner Home Video began releasing volumes for the UK on August 29, 2011.

On October 8, 2013, Warner Home Video released the first season of Scooby-Doo! Mystery Incorporated on a four DVD set in the United States. On October 7, 2014, the second season was released in another 4-disc set in the US.

On October 20, 2026, Warner Archive released the entire series on Blu-ray.

Scooby-Doo! Mystery Incorporated home video releases
Season		Episodes	Release dates
Season		Region 1	Region 2
1	26	Volume 1: January 25, 2011; Episodes: "Beware the Beast from Below" – "Revenge of the Man Crab" Volume 2: May 10, 2011; Episodes: "The Song of Mystery" – "The Grasp of the Gnome" Volume 3: September 27, 2011; Episodes: "Battle of the Humungonauts" – "The Shrieking Madness" Season 1, Part 2: Crystal Cove Curse: January 24, 2012; Episodes: "When the Cicada Calls" – "All Fear the Freak"	Volume 1: August 29, 2011; Episodes: "Beware the Beast from Below" – "Revenge of the Man Crab" Volume 2: February 13, 2012; Episodes: "The Song of Mystery" – "The Grasp of the Gnome" Volume 3: May 20, 2013; Episodes: "Battle of the Humungonauts" – "The Shrieking Madness" Volume 4: August 12, 2013; Episodes: "When the Cicada Calls" – "All Fear the Freak"
2	26	Part 1: Danger in the Deep: November 13, 2012; Episodes: "The Night the Clown Cried" – "Wrath of the Krampus" Part 2: Spooky Stampede: June 18, 2013; Episodes: "Heart of Evil" – "Come Undone" The Complete Second Season: October 7, 2014	N/A

== Awards and nominations ==
Year	Association	Category	Result
2011	Kids' Choice Awards	Favorite Cartoon	Nominated
2012	Kids' Choice Awards	Favorite Cartoon	Nominated

== Episodic online video game ==
Cartoon Network released an episodic video game on their website called Scooby-Doo! Mystery Incorporated: Crystal Cove Online, which had a new mystery every week based on the aired episode. The player takes control of Shaggy and Scooby as they explore Crystal Cove, solving mysteries and helping other citizens with the rest of the gang. Although there are 52 episodes, Cartoon Network stopped updating the game at the end of season 1.
