= The 13 Ghosts of Scooby-Doo =

American animated television series

- Based on: Characters by Hanna-Barbera Productions
- Developed by: Tom Ruegger
- Directed by: Art Davis; Oscar Dufau; Tony Love; Don Lusk; Rudy Zamora; Alan Zaslove; Ray Patterson
- Voices of: Don Messick; Casey Kasem; Heather North; Vincent Price; Susan Blu; Arte Johnson; Howard Morris
- Theme music composer: Hoyt Curtin
- Country of origin: United States
- Original language: English
- No. of seasons: 1
- No. of episodes: 13

Production
- Executive producers: William Hanna; Joseph Barbera; Tom Ruegger
- Producer: Mitch Schauer
- Running time: 22 minutes
- Production company: Hanna-Barbera Productions

Original release
- Network: ABC
- Release: September 7 – December 7, 1985

Related
- List of Scooby-Doo TV series

The 13 Ghosts of Scooby-Doo is an American animated television series produced by Hanna-Barbera Productions, and the seventh incarnation of the studio's Scooby-Doo franchise. It premiered on September 7, 1985, and ran for one season on ABC as a half-hour program. Thirteen episodes of the show were made in 1985. It replaced The New Scooby-Doo Mysteries and aired alongside Scooby's Mystery Funhouse, a repackaging of earlier shows.

The series also aired in reruns on USA Network in the 1990s, on Cartoon Network, and currently on Boomerang. With 13 episodes, it is currently the shortest-running series in the Scooby-Doo franchise. A follow-up film from a different creative team, Scooby-Doo! and the Curse of the 13th Ghost, released in 2019, featured the previously unseen 13th ghost and ended the series.

== Plot ==
This is a warning to all living mortals that whosoever opens this Chest of Demons will release 13 of the most terrifying ghosts upon the face of the Earth!

— Vincent Van Ghoul, in the original opening title sequence

In the initial episode, the gang are thrown off course on a trip to Honolulu in Daphne's plane but accidentally landing instead in the Himalayas. While inside a temple, Scooby and Shaggy are tricked by two bumbling ghosts named Weerd and Bogel into opening the Chest of Demons, a magical artifact that houses the 13 most terrifying and powerful ghosts and demons ever to walk the face of the Earth. As the ghosts can only be returned to the chest by those who originally set them free, Scooby and Shaggy, accompanied by Daphne, Scrappy-Doo, and a young boy named Flim Flam, embark on a worldwide quest to recapture them before they wreak irreversible havoc upon the world.

Assisting them is Flim Flam's friend, a warlock named Vincent Van Ghoul (based upon and voiced by Vincent Price), who contacts the gang using his crystal ball and often employs magic and witchcraft to assist them. The 13 escaped ghosts, meanwhile, each attempt to do away with the gang lest they are returned to the chest, often employing Weerd and Bogel as lackeys.

Fred Jones and Velma Dinkley were both absent in this incarnation. In Scooby-Doo! and the Curse of the 13th Ghost, it is revealed that they were away at summer camp.

== Voice cast ==
- Don Messick – Scooby-Doo and Scrappy-Doo
- Casey Kasem – Shaggy
- Heather North – Daphne Blake
- Susan Blu – Flim-Flam
- Arte Johnson – Weerd
- Howard Morris – Bogel
- Vincent Price – Vincent Van Ghoul

== Episodes ==
No.	Title	Directed by	Story by	Original release date
1	"To All the Ghouls I've Loved Before"	Ray Patterson	Tom Ruegger	September 7, 1985
After crash-landing in a Himalayan village where its cursed inhabitants become werewolves at night, Scooby and Shaggy unwittingly release the 13 ghosts from the Chest of Demons.
2	"Scoobra Kadoobra"	Ray Patterson	Gordon Bressack & Mark Seidenberg	September 14, 1985
The gang pursues Maldor, a ghost warlock from the Dark Ages, in the depths of a haunted castle. There, they find a powerful artifact that Maldor himself seeks but may also prove the ghost's undoing.: Ghost: Maldor the Malevolent
3	"Me and My Shadow Demon"	Ray Patterson	Cynthia Friedlob & John Semper	September 21, 1985
Lured to the enigmatic Befuddle Manor, the gang must contend with a ghoulish convention of ghosts and the mysterious Shadow Demon led by vampire witch Queen Morbidia.: Ghost: Queen Morbidia
4	"Reflections in a Ghoulish Eye"	Ray Patterson	Charles M. Howell, IV & Rich Fogel	September 28, 1985
While at a Ghost Chaser convention in Marrakesh, the gang encounters a mirror demon: a frightful apparition who has the power to trap mortals in his eerie mirror dimension. To complicate the situation, the hotel concierge thinks the gang has kidnapped a maid, although she was actually kidnapped accidentally by the demon.: Ghost: Reflector Specter (Mirror Demon)
5	"That's Monstertainment"	Ray Patterson	Tom Ruegger & Mitch Schauer	October 5, 1985
The gang is trapped in the classic horror film "The Son of the Bride of the Ghost of Frankenstein" by Zomba, a zombie-like ghoul who attempts to nab the Chest of Demons from Scooby's heavily guarded room.: Ghost: Zomba
6	"Ship of Ghouls"	Ray Patterson	Misty Stewart-Taggart	October 12, 1985
Too much of a nervous wreck to continue, the gang takes an anxiously frightened Scooby on a vacation cruise, where Bogel and Weerd plan to scare Scooby to death. However, the gang does not suspect that the captain of the cruise is a ghost and wants to free his fellow spirits from the Chest of Demons.: Ghost: Captain Ferguson
7	"A Spooky Little Ghoul Like You"	Ray Patterson	John Ludin	October 19, 1985
While attending a warlock convention, Vincent Van Ghoul is placed under an amorous enchantment by Nekara, an enchantress with the power to drain warlocks of their powers by kissing them.: Ghost: Nekara
8	"When You Witch Upon a Star"	Ray Patterson	Jeff Holder & Tom Ruegger	October 26, 1985
Three bumbling witches named Ernestine, Wanda, and Hilda Brewski (similar to The Three Stooges) are tasked by the powerful witch Marcella to perform a spell that will free her from the dimension in which she is trapped. Meanwhile, Vincent goes to the Zone of Eternal Evil where he is subsequently captured by Marcella.: Ghost: Marcella
9	"It's a Wonderful Scoob"	Ray Patterson	John Ludin & Tom Ruegger	November 2, 1985
After one fright too many while pursuing Time Slime, Scooby quits the gang and moves back in with his parents. After an audition for another anthropomorphic dog, Flim Flam has Scooby replaced by a lazy and dim sheepdog named Bernie Gumsher. This not only causes child protests across the nation which in turn leads to a televised address from President Ronald Reagan but also causes the gang to be captured by Time Slime. Vincent Van Ghoul takes Scooby to the future to show him what the world will be like if he does not return to stop Time Slime from releasing the demons that were previously reimprisoned.: Ghost: Time Slime
10	"Scooby in Kwackyland"	Ray Patterson	Tom Ruegger & Misty Stewart-Taggart	November 9, 1985
The gang and the furry-like ghoul, Demondo are trapped in the newspaper comics section and must rely on the help of comic characters—including Scooby's favorite, Platypus Duck—to escape.: Ghost: Demondo
11	"Coast-to-Ghost"	Ray Patterson	Cynthia Friedlob & John Semper	November 16, 1985
As part of an initiation test to join S.A.P.S. (short for Spook and Poltergeist Society), the vampire demon Rankor tricks Vincent Van Ghoul into looking into the Eye of Eternity, which slowly turns him into stone. In order to cure him, the gang—accompanied by two-faced Bogel and Weerd—must travel from California to Massachusetts to acquire the Mask of Moomma. To complicate matters, they are relentlessly pursued not only by Rankor but also by the authorities for something Bogel and Weerd did.: Ghost: Rankor
12	"The Ghouliest Show on Earth"	Ray Patterson	Evelyn Gabai & Glenn Leopold	November 23, 1985
A circus comes to Dooville and enchants the residents, including Scooby's parents and Flim-Flam (the latter out of seeing business opportunities). Shaggy and Scooby discover that the circus is staffed by demons and monsters and its evil ringmaster Professor Phantazmo whose calliope hides the circus' true face and who wants the Chest of Demons.: Ghost: Professor Fantazmo
13	"Horror-Scope Scoob"	Ray Patterson	Charles M. Howell, IV	December 7, 1985
When the gang appears on the TV show You Won't Believe It... or Else! owned by Boris Kreepoff, the lion demon, Zimbulu attempts to steal the Chest of Demons, but it was stolen by someone else unbeknownst to the gang. Accompanied by Vincent Van Ghoul and a medium named Tallulah, the gang attempts to find the chest.: Ghost: Zimbulu

== Production ==
The series was created and produced by Mitch Schauer. Tom Ruegger was associate producer and story editor, and the irreverent, fourth wall-breaking humor found in each episode resurfaced in his later works, among them A Pup Named Scooby-Doo, Tiny Toon Adventures, and Animaniacs. Of The 13 Ghosts of Scooby-Doo, Ruegger recalls not being fond of the Flim-Flam character or the other added characters in the cast, whom he felt had been added to appease focus groups. As with most of the other early-1980s Scooby-Doo entries after the 1979 Scooby-Doo and Scrappy-Doo series, original characters Fred Jones and Velma Dinkley do not appear, and the enemies were real (within the context of the series) ghosts and not simply humans in costume. 13 Ghosts ended its run after 13 episodes and was replaced by reruns of Laff-a-Lympics in March 1986, before the end of the season. At the time of the cancellation, twelve of the thirteen ghosts were recaptured in the chest of demons with the show-stopping production before the last ghost could be found. To date, it is the last Scooby-Doo running series to have featured Scrappy-Doo, who was removed as a regular character after the three Hanna-Barbera Superstars 10 movies in 1987–88; those three movies would be the only new Scooby-Doo content produced during the hiatus.

For a brief period from 1986 to 1988, ABC revamped its Saturday morning block in hopes of targeting the preschool audience, a factor in the darker 13 Ghosts series being axed; this proved to be a colossal failure, with ABC vice president Squire Rushnell conceding in 1988 that "we got killed" in the ratings because preschoolers could not operate people meters, then recently introduced as a ratings measurement tool. When ABC reversed that plan and returned to legacy properties that would appeal to whole family audiences, Ruegger decided that they would overhaul the series entirely, developing A Pup Named Scooby-Doo in 1988.

A direct-to-video film released in 2019, Scooby-Doo! and the Curse of the 13th Ghost, resolves the open ending of the original and features the entire gang helping Vincent Van Ghoul in capturing the thirteenth and last ghost.

Shaggy and Daphne were both present and were both given new uniforms, Daphne's being more of an '80s style that was fairly similar to that of Charlie's Angels, the headband was removed and she was given bangs. Shaggy had the same clothes, except his color scheme changed to a red T-shirt, baggy blue jeans and brown shoes. A reason for this color change has, to this day, not been specified. He would only wear this outfit four more times in the more than three decades since it was introduced, the last appearance being in 2001's Scooby-Doo and the Cyber Chase as part of the gang's digital counterparts. Hints that this style may be coming back were implied in 2019's Scooby-Doo Return to Zombie Island, where Shaggy is seen wearing a red floral shirt while laying out on a boat.

== Home media ==
On June 29, 2010, Warner Home Video (via Hanna-Barbera and Warner Bros. Family Entertainment) released The 13 Ghosts of Scooby-Doo: The Complete Series on DVD in Region 1, which included "Don't Feed the Animals", an episode of Shaggy & Scooby-Doo Get a Clue!, as a bonus feature. Exactly the same DVD in Region 2 was Released on 17 October 2016, with the Bonus episode also included.

DVD name	No. of episodes	Release date	Bonus episode
The 13 Ghosts of Scooby-Doo: The Complete Series	13	June 29, 2010 (Region 1); October 17, 2016 (Region 2)	Shaggy & Scooby-Doo Get a Clue!: Don't Feed the Animals

== Reception ==
The series was heavily profiled in the Christian fundamentalist documentary Deception of a Generation as an example of alleged occult influences on children's entertainment.

== Follow-up film ==
34 years after the series ended, a movie was created based on the series called Scooby-Doo! and the Curse of the 13th Ghost to give it a symbolic end.

== See also ==
- Scooby-Doo! and the Curse of the 13th Ghost
- Scooby-Doo (character)
- List of works produced by Hanna-Barbera Productions
- List of Hanna-Barbera characters
- List of Scooby-Doo characters
