= Scooby-Doo! Music of the Vampire =

- DVD cover
- Directed by: David Block
- Written by: Tom Sheppard
- Based on: Characters by Hanna-Barbera Productions
- Produced by: Spike Brandt; Tony Cervone
- Starring: Frank Welker; Mindy Cohn; Grey DeLisle; Matthew Lillard; Jeff Bennett; Christian Campbell; Jim Cummings; Mindy Sterling
- Edited by: Kyle Stafford
- Music by: Andy Sturmer
- Production company: Warner Bros. Animation
- Distributed by: Warner Home Video
- Release date: March 13, 2012
- Running time: 78 minutes
- Country: United States
- Language: English

Scooby-Doo! Music of the Vampire is a 2012 direct-to-DVD animated musical comedy horror film, and the seventeenth entry in the direct-to-video series of Scooby-Doo films. This installment is notable for being the first of the films to be a musical. The film was released to rent through Amazon Video and iTunes on December 22, 2011. It was released on DVD and Blu-ray on March 13, 2012. It premiered on Cartoon Network on March 3, 2012.

== Plot ==
Fred, Daphne, Velma, Shaggy, and Scooby decide to take a well-deserved vacation. Velma drives them to Petit Chauve Sourie Ville, a small town in Louisiana that is hosting a vampire festival called "Vampire Palooza". They meet Lita Rutland, the festival organizer, who explains that tourism is down and the festival is losing funds. They also meet their host, Vincent Van Helsing, a descendant of Abraham Van Helsing, who runs a vampire museum and is an author, although his books are not selling. Mayoral candidate Jesper Poubelle, an anti-vampire agitator, is also stirring up trouble by protesting the festival. Mr. Van Helsing takes the gang back to his museum and shows them an ancient book detailing vampire ways, a jeweled necklace and elaborate tiara claimed to belong to a vampire bride, and a glass-faced casket containing the inert body of Lord Valdronya, a centuries-old vampire.

The gang and Van Helsing attend a performance by a troupe of actors. The actors are deeply dedicated to the vampire lifestyle and only perform at night. The troupe leader Bram, who catches the eye of Daphne, announces the group will perform a vampire resurrection ritual. The group has another member backstage ready to appear, but to everyone's surprise, their incantation proves far more successful, and the resurrected Valdronya appears on the stage before flying away. Back at the museum, the gang discovers the bridal jewellery missing and the body gone, although the tomb is still sealed. Out on the festival grounds, they find Lita Rutland wants to profit from the publicity of the vampire appearance. Jesper Poubelle also gets a media exposure benefit for his anti-vampire crusade. They check out the trailer of his organization and discover he plans to run for Mayor, and is using the vampire story to increase his notoriety. On the way back, they are attacked by Valdronya.

That night, Shaggy and Scooby are attacked by Valdronya and chased into the swamp, where Shaggy thinks he's been bitten and will turn into a vampire. There they meet Tulie, who reveals he invented a pair of hover shoes, but the plans were stolen by vampires, and he was forced to flee into the swamp. Meanwhile, Fred, Daphne, and Velma discover the fabric from Valdronya's costume is from modern material. Van Helsing, however, says the clothing has been changed over the years due to the disintegration of the original material, but the body is still the actual vampire. Daphne decides to question the troupe and meets with Bram. When she turns down his offers of affection, with a promise of immortality, he kidnaps her to become the bride of Valdronya.

Daphne alerts Fred via text message, and Fred, Velma, and Van Helsing travel into the swamp to stop the marriage ceremony. On their way, Van Helsing is pulled from the ship and disappears; when Fred and Velma investigate they instead find Shaggy and Scooby, where Velma proves to Shaggy that he is not turning into a vampire as it was just a splinter on his neck. The actors tie Daphne up and put the tiara and necklace on her. The monster appears to claim his bride, and with a swirl of green mist he sends the actors to sleep, telling them that when they awake they will be immortal. Daphne also succumbs to the mist and in a trance she agrees to the wedding. Valdronya arrives, but Shaggy and Scooby distract him while Velma unties her. In the ensuing chase, Valdronya's costume is blown away by Scooby and Shaggy's airboat's propeller, revealing modern clothes and Tulie's hover boots underneath, and the vampire is then captured by Fred.

Valdronya is unmasked and revealed to be Van Helsing. He wanted to stage a vampire wedding to create his own new tourist attraction, and increase sales of his books. He used stolen boots, knockout gas, a machine in the swamp and holographic projections to create the monster effects. The actors were duped into thinking Valdronya was a real vampire who could grant them immortality, so they helped him. The sheriff arrests Van Helsing and the actors. Afterwards, the gang happily returns to their vacation.

== Voice cast ==
- Frank Welker as Fred Jones and Scooby-Doo
  - Jim Wise as Fred Jones (singing voice)
- Matthew Lillard as Shaggy Rogers
- Grey DeLisle as Daphne Blake
- Mindy Cohn as Velma Dinkley
  - Bets Malone as Velma Dinkley (singing voice)
- Jeff Bennett as Vincent Van Helsing/Lord Valdronya
- Mindy Sterling as Lita Rutland
- Christian Campbell as Bram
- Jim Cummings as Jesper Poubelle and Tulie
- Robert Townsend as Vampire Actor #1
- Rob Paulsen as Vampire Actor #2, the Sheriff, and Teen Vampire
- Julianne Buescher as Vampire Actor #3 and Kelly Smith
- Obba Babatunde as Vampire Actor #4
- Jim Wise as Henry

== Song listing ==
1. "Bayou Breeze" (Jim Cummings)
2. "Done With Monsters" (Matthew Lillard, Grey DeLisle, Frank Welker, Jim Wise and Bets Malone)
3. "The Vampires Dance" (Obba Babatunde, Julianne Buescher, Christian Campbell, Rob Paulsen and Robert Townsend)
4. "Valdronya Returns" (Obba Babatunde, Julianne Buescher, Christian Campbell, Rob Paulsen and Robert Townsend)
5. "Valdronya Returns (reprise)" (Obba Babatunde, Jeff Bennett, Julianne Buescher, Christian Campbell, Rob Paulsen and Robert Townsend)
6. "The Vampires Bite" (Mindy Sterling)
7. "Scooby and Me" (Obba Babatunde, Jeff Bennett, Julianne Buescher, Christian Campbell, Jim Cummings, Matthew Lillard, Rob Paulsen, Mindy Sterling, Robert Townsend and Frank Welker)
8. "Do You Want to Live Forever?" (Christian Campbell and Grey DeLisle)
9. "Bride of the Vampire" (Christian Campbell, Robert Townsend, Rob Paulsen, Julianne Buescher and Obba Babatunde)
10. "Done With Monsters (reprise)" (Matthew Lillard, Grey DeLisle, Frank Welker, Jim Wise and Bets Malone)
