= Scooby-Doo! and the Curse of the 13th Ghost =

American animated direct-to-video film based on The 13 Ghosts of Scooby-Doo

- Official DVD cover
- Directed by: Cecilia Aranovich Hamilton
- Written by: Tim Sheridan
- Based on: Characters by Hanna-Barbera Productions
- Produced by: Jennifer Coyle; Amy McKenna
- Starring: Frank Welker; Grey DeLisle; Matthew Lillard; Kate Micucci
- Edited by: Robert Ehreinreich; Robby Wells
- Music by: Robert J. Kral
- Production company: Warner Bros. Animation
- Distributed by: Warner Bros. Home Entertainment
- Release dates: February 5, 2019 (DVD and digital)
- Running time: 82 minutes
- Country: United States
- Language: English

Scooby-Doo! and the Curse of the 13th Ghost is a 2019 American animated direct-to-video comedy mystery film produced by Warner Bros. Animation and distributed by Warner Bros. Home Entertainment, and the thirty-second entry in the direct-to-video series of Scooby-Doo films. The film is a continuation of the 1985 animated television series The 13 Ghosts of Scooby-Doo, designed to provide a conclusion to the show's unfinished storyline. The film was released on DVD and digital on February 5, 2019.

== Plot ==
The movie opens with a flashback of a young Vincent Van Ghoul and his partner Mortifer Quinch successfully hunting down and sealing the 13th Ghost in the Chest of Demons. However, Mortifer was attacked and seemingly killed by minion ghosts as a tearful Van Ghoul makes his escape.

In the opening credits of the movie, Van Ghoul recaps the events of The 13 Ghosts of Scooby-Doo in which Scooby-Doo set the 13 Ghosts free once more by accident, but would catch all but one with the help of Shaggy Rogers, Daphne Blake, and young Flim-Flam.

In the present day, Scooby, Shaggy, Daphne, Fred Jones, and Velma Dinkley chase Farmer Morgan through the shopping mall and eventually capture him in Old Timey Toys. When the gang tries to unmask him, Morgan appears to be the real deal. Just then, the sheriff arrives with the real culprit Mrs. Malveaux who stopped a deal with Morgan. The sheriff chastises the gang for capturing the wrong suspect. He threatens them that if he ever sees them driving around in the Mystery Machine, he will put them in jail and also reminds them of the new leash law for dogs. With that, the sheriff tells the gang to stop solving mysteries.

The next day, the gang has a garage sale, selling all the monster costumes from their previous mysteries, as well as the Mystery Machine, much to Fred's misery. While Shaggy and Scooby relax in deckchairs, a customer named Bernie Alan discovers the crystal ball amongst their old mystery stuff, making Shaggy and Scooby recognize it from their 13 Ghosts adventures. Just then, Van Ghoul contacts Daphne, Shaggy, and Scooby about the 13th and final Ghost. When Fred and Velma inquire what is going on, Daphne fills them in on her 13 Ghosts mysteries with Shaggy and Scooby while Fred and Velma were away from the gang after the events of Scooby-Doo and Scrappy-Doo.

After changing into her old 13 Ghosts outfit, Daphne unveils her old red van, the Miss-tery Machine, to Fred and Velma, and the gang start on their journey to meet Van Ghoul at his castle. On their way, the gang are chased by a phantom car, but Daphne manages to outmaneuver it skillfully. When Fred sees Daphne take charge, it furthers his existential crisis as he feels he is without a role. When the gang meet Van Ghoul, they are attacked by the 13th Ghost, a winged demon named Asmodeus. Shaggy sheepishly reveals that he sent the chest to Van Ghoul's residence in the Himalayas, and the gang heads over there using a flying boat.

When they arrive, the gang encounters Bernie Alan, who inquired about the crystal ball at their garage sale, and Daphne, Shaggy, Scooby, and Van Ghoul trail him, but then get attacked by the phantom car and it revs its engine to cause an avalanche. Van Ghoul reveals that he is unable to use his magic powers and the four crash into a temple. Meanwhile, Fred and Velma search a seemingly abandoned post office in a village, and they meet Flim Flam, now an adult, who tries to sell them his Chest of Demons merchandise and ghost-catching equipment. When Fred and Velma leave the shop, they are suddenly snatched up by something even Velma cannot explain.

At the temple, Asmodeus had been waiting for Van Ghoul and he chases the four when they find the chest. While running, Van Ghoul destroys his crystal ball and transports Shaggy, Scooby, and Daphne outside the temple where they meet Fred and Velma. As the gang fell into despondence, Fred reveals that he actually went to a cheerleading school during his time away from his friends. As Fred cheers for his despondent gang, a restored Daphne concocts a plan.

Velma visits Flim Flam's store and takes everything. Suddenly, the phantom car pursues Fred, Velma and Flim Flam, but they evade with the Miss-tery Machine's installed upgrades. Meanwhile, Shaggy, Scooby, and Daphne infiltrate the castle to rescue Van Ghoul. Afterward, they reunite with Fred, Velma, and Flim Flam. The latter asks about Scrappy, which confuses the gang for a moment. Going into the castle, they find Van Ghoul defeated. He reveals to the gang that Asmodeus is really the demon form of his magically powerful ancestor, Asamad Van Ghoul, and blames the impending doom on himself.

Asmodeus opens the Chest, something Velma points out as being impossible, as the Chest can only be opened by a living person. Asmodeus tries to escape, but he gets intercepted by Daphne. Asmodeus is unmasked as Mortifer, who reveals that he faked his own death by casting an illusion to fool Van Ghoul and he explains that he wanted to sell Flim Flam the Chest for $10 million. Bernie Alan arrives and he reveals himself to be an Interpol agent named Vance Linklater and he arrests Mortifer. Just as Mortifer is taken into custody, he escapes in the phantom car but gets recaptured.

A visage of the real Asmodeus/Asamad briefly appears before the gang and Velma deduces that the real Asmodeus was really watching over Van Ghoul and he has achieved redemption. She however fabricated the story to give Van Ghoul closure and debunks the previous 12 Ghosts as hallucinations due to the Himalayan thin air and teases opening the real Chest. After seeing everyone's fearful faces, she decides not to.

As the gang get ready to depart for home, Daphne kisses Flim Flam as a thank you for his help and Van Ghoul warns Flim Flam to stay out of trouble. As they fly back home, Daphne decides the gang should continue solving mysteries and gives the leadership job back to Fred.

== Voice cast ==
- Frank Welker as Scooby-Doo, Fred Jones
- Grey DeLisle as Daphne Blake, Mrs. Malveaux
- Matthew Lillard as Shaggy Rogers
- Kate Micucci as Velma Dinkley
- Maurice LaMarche as Vincent Van Ghoul, Bernie Alan/Vance Linklater
- Noshir Dalal as Flim Flam
- Nolan North as Asmodeus, Mortifer Quinch, Farmer Morgan
- David Herman as Sheriff

== Links to the television series The 13 Ghosts of Scooby-Doo ==
Although this film is a direct follow-up to The 13 Ghosts of Scooby-Doo, it also retcons most of its events by removing the character of Scrappy-Doo and all of its supernatural elements.
