= Scooby-Doo! Adventures: The Mystery Map =

- iTunes cover
- Directed by: Jomac Noph
- Screenplay by: Tosh E. Maab
- Based on: Scooby-Doo by William Hanna, Joseph Barbera, Iwao Takamoto, Joe Ruby, & Ken Spears; A Pup Named Scooby-Doo by Tom Ruegger
- Produced by: David Rudman & Adam Rudman
- Starring: Eric Jacobson; Matt Vogel; Stephanie D'Abruzzo; Alice Dinnean; Peter Linz; David Rudman; Frank Welker; Grey DeLisle Griffin; Matthew Lillard; John Rhys-Davies
- Cinematography: Mark Kluiszo
- Edited by: Maeve Price
- Music by: Terry Fryer
- Production companies: Warner Bros. Animation; Spiffy Pictures
- Distributed by: Warner Home Video
- Release dates: July 21, 2013 (San Diego Comic-Con); July 23, 2013 (United States)
- Running time: 45 minutes
- Country: United States

Scooby-Doo! Adventures: The Mystery Map is a 2013 American puppet comedy mystery film, and is the twentieth installment in the Scooby-Doo direct-to-video series. It premiered on July 21, 2013, at San Diego Comic-Con, and was released on July 23, 2013, as a digital download and as a Walmart-exclusive DVD. It was released everywhere on DVD on February 11, 2014.

The puppets themselves are based on the main characters' designs from A Pup Named Scooby-Doo.

== Plot ==
The Scooby Gang are hanging out in their tree house. Fred is lifting weights talking to himself in the mirror, Velma is using her computer, and Daphne is looking at her shoes and orders them to be lined up. Shaggy then orders a pizza, which is delivered instantly by Stu Stukowski. The gang denies eating the pizza when it arrives. Then Scooby finds a rolled up map in his slice of pizza. Velma discovers that the map is said to lead to the treasure of Gnarlybeard the Pirate. The gang sets out to find the treasure of Gnarlybeard the Pirate, only to be attacked by Phantom Parrot, who manages to swipe the map. Following the Phantom Parrot, they come across Dr. Escobar and Shirley – the latter Fred is smitten with. Thinking that the treasure is in the lighthouse, they manage to trap Phantom Parrot, finding out that it is Stu Stukowski. According to him, Gnarleybeard the Pirate is a distant relative of his, and the treasure is not discovered in the lighthouse.

However, back at the tree house, they discover that there is a piece missing from the map, which Scooby had eaten. The gang discovers that Gnarlybeard was Shirley in disguise, and Gnarlybeard's treasure was beard and hair care products. Shaggy and Scooby take advantage of this by occupying the bathroom and having fun with the products, while Fred, Daphne and Velma pound on the door.

== Cast ==
=== Puppeteers ===
- David Rudman as Scooby-Doo
- Eric Jacobson as Shaggy Rogers
- Matt Vogel as Fred Jones
- Stephanie D'Abruzzo as Velma Dinkley, Shirley Stukowski
- Alice Dinnean as Daphne Blake, Dr. Escobar
- Peter Linz as Ye Phantom Parrot, Gnarlybeard, Stu Stukowski, Lighthouse Lou
- Paul McGinnis as Additional puppets

=== Voice cast ===
- Frank Welker as Fred Jones, Scooby-Doo
- Grey DeLisle Griffin as Daphne Blake, Dr. Escobar
- Matthew Lillard as Shaggy Rogers
- John Rhys-Davies as Gnarlybeard
- Dee Bradley Baker as Ye Phantom Parrot, Stu Stukowski
- Jeff Bennett as Lighthouse Lou, Hot Dog Vendor

== Songs ==
- "Here Comes Summer" (Scooby-Doo! Camp Scare)
- "Dig It" (Scooby-Doo! Legend of the Phantosaur)
- "Scooby-Doo: Abracadabra Doo" (Scooby-Doo! Abracadabra-Doo)

== See also ==
- A Pup Named Scooby-Doo
