= Scooby-Doo! and the Loch Ness Monster =

- DVD cover
- Directed by: Scott Jeralds; Joe Sichta
- Screenplay by: George Doty IV; Ed Scharlach; Mark Turosz
- Story by: Joe Sichta
- Based on: Characters by Hanna-Barbera Productions
- Produced by: Joe Sichta; Margaret M. Dean
- Starring: Frank Welker; Casey Kasem; Mindy Cohn; Grey DeLisle
- Edited by: Margaret Hou
- Music by: Thomas Chase
- Production company: Warner Bros. Animation
- Distributed by: Warner Home Video
- Release date: June 22, 2004
- Running time: 74 minutes
- Country: United States
- Languages: English; Scots; Scottish Gaelic

Scooby-Doo! and the Loch Ness Monster is a 2004 direct-to-video animated comedy mystery film, and the seventh direct-to-video film based upon the Scooby-Doo Saturday morning cartoons. It was released on June 22, 2004, and it was produced by Warner Bros. Animation.

== Plot ==
The Mystery, Inc. gang travel to Loch Ness to see Blake Castle, home of Daphne Blake's Scottish ancestors and her cousin, Shannon Blake, for the upcoming annual Highland games. Upon their arrival, Shannon informs them that the castle has recently been terrorized by the Loch Ness Monster. Along the way, the gang encounter Del Chillman, a Loch Ness Monster enthusiast and amateur cryptozoologist; Professor Fiona Pembrooke, a scientist who has staked her scientific career on proving the monster's existence; local competitors and brothers Colin and Angus Haggart; their father Lachlan; and Sir Ian Locksley, the games' head judge, a rival of Pembrooke's, and director of Scotland's natural history museum who firmly believes the monster does not exist.

Later that night, Shaggy Rogers and his dog Scooby-Doo head to the kitchen, but are chased by the monster, destroying the playing field in the process. The following morning, an enraged Locksley orders Shannon to repair the damage while Velma Dinkley discovers monster tracks that lead towards a nearby town instead of the loch. While the Haggarts repair the field, the Blakes, Velma, and Fred Jones take Pembrooke's boat to search the loch while Shaggy and Scooby use Mystery Inc.'s van, the Mystery Machine, to search by land. However, both groups are simultaneously attacked by the monster.

Upon their return, the gang learn Locksley is conducting his own search via a high-tech ship to prevent any further "peculiarities" from disrupting the games. Using his sonar equipment, the gang find something deep in the loch. They take Locksley's minisub to investigate, but are attacked once more, during which a camera gets broken off before Locksley's crew rescues them. The gang later learn Chillman's van was stolen before being attacked a third time, only to learn their pursuer was Chillman's van dressed up as the monster.

Fred sets up a trap to capture the real monster before sending Shaggy and Scooby out on the loch to act as bait. Complicating matters, a heavy fog bank rolls in, blocking visual contact with the pair while Locksley's crew mounts a mutiny and captures him, the gang, Shannon, and Chillman, intending to capture and sell the monster. As Shaggy and Scooby are attacked, Fred and Chillman are pulled into the water by Fred's net trap while the Blakes stop the mutineers and capture the monster with the ship's magnetic claw. Suddenly, a second monster emerges and chases Shaggy and Scooby, only to fall into a pit trap the gang previously set up. The first monster is revealed to be a modified submarine operated by Pembrooke, who hired the Haggart brothers to operate the second monster, a huge puppet. Velma deduces Pembrooke concocted the scheme to convince Locksley of the monster's existence and enlist his aid in finding it.

The next day, as the games get underway, Locksley calls everyone to his ship to review pictures of what appears to be the real Loch Ness Monster that the detached camera took, which came from a depth far below that even Pembrooke's submarine could not operate at. Finally convinced that the monster might be real, Locksley invites Pembrooke and Chillman to help him investigate further. As Mystery Inc. leaves Scotland, Velma observes "maybe some mysteries are just better left unsolved" while Scooby glimpses the monster swimming by.

== Production ==
Scooby-Doo! and the Loch Ness Monster is the 7th direct-to-video Scooby feature. It was produced by Warner Bros. Animation, though Warner Bros. had fully absorbed Hanna-Barbera Cartoons by this time, Hanna-Barbera was still credited as the copyright holder and the film ended with an H-B logo. Unlike the previous two films, it is not in the "classic format", and does not have the 1969 voice cast, and instead has Mystery Inc. voiced by their regular voice actors, and has them wearing their outfits from What's New, Scooby-Doo?. It is also the first film to have Mindy Cohn voice Velma Dinkley, the What's New, Scooby-Doo? theme song, and the film has Grey DeLisle returning to voice Daphne Blake since Scooby-Doo and the Cyber Chase.

The film is the 3rd and final written by Mark Turosz, one of three directed by Scott Jeralds, and the first of five produced by Joe Sichta.

Two songs were written and produced by Tom Chase for the film, "Brothers Forever" and "Come Get it", with additional songs "Brown Dog" by the Young Dubliners and "Back on the Train" by Phish.

== Voice cast ==
- Frank Welker as Scooby-Doo, Fred Jones, Lachlan Haggart
- Casey Kasem as Shaggy Rogers
- Grey DeLisle as Daphne Blake, Shannon Blake
- Mindy Cohn as Velma Dinkley
- Michael Bell as Duncan MacGubbin, McIntyre
- Jeff Bennett as Del Chillman, Sir Ian Locksley, Harpoon Gunner
- John DiMaggio as Colin Haggart, Volunteer #1
- Phil LaMarr as Angus Haggart, Volunteer #2
- Sheena Easton as Professor Fiona Pembrooke

== Reception ==
- The film was nominated for the Annie Award for Best Animated Home Entertainment Production in 2004.
- Variety ranked the film 6th in "The 10 Best ‘Scooby-Doo’ Films".
- Screen Rant included the film as one of the best Scooby-Doo films, and as having a sympathetic villain. Del Chillman was also included in "10 Supporting Characters That Should Have Their Own Spinoffs".
- Game Rant ranked "Brown Dog" 2nd in "Best Scooby-Doo Chase Songs".

== Novelization ==
Scholastic Inc. released a novelization of the story in conjunction with the film. The novel was written by American fantasy and science fiction author Suzanne Weyn.
