= Scooby-Doo! Return to Zombie Island =

American animated direct-to-video film and sequel to Scooby-Doo on Zombie Island

- DVD cover
- Directed by: Cecilia Aranovich Hamilton; Ethan Spaulding
- Written by: Jeremy Adams
- Based on: Scooby-Doo by William Hanna, Joseph Barbera, Iwao Takamoto, Joe Ruby & Ken Spears Elvira by Cassandra Peterson
- Produced by: Rick Morales; Jim Krieg; Amy McKenna (line producer); Sam Register (executive producer)
- Starring: Frank Welker; Grey DeLisle; Matthew Lillard; Kate Micucci
- Edited by: Robert Ehrenreich
- Music by: Robert J. Kral
- Production company: Warner Bros. Animation
- Distributed by: Warner Bros. Home Entertainment
- Release dates: July 21, 2019 (SDCC); September 3, 2019 (United States)
- Running time: 80 minutes
- Country: United States
- Language: English

Scooby-Doo! Return to Zombie Island is a 2019 American animated direct-to-video mystery film produced by Warner Bros. Animation and distributed by Warner Bros. Home Entertainment. It is the thirty-third entry in the direct-to-video series of Scooby-Doo films and a standalone sequel to the 1998 direct-to-video animated film Scooby-Doo on Zombie Island, the first film in the Scooby-Doo direct-to-video franchise. The film premiered at San Diego Comic-Con on July 21, 2019, followed by a digital and home media release on September 3, 2019.

== Plot ==
The gang lure a werewolf in a trap and catch the culprit: Young Man Withers. Soon after cleaning the Mystery Machine, the gang capture more monsters including the Snow Ghost, the Creeper, and the Spooky Space Kook, who are the entire Withers family. But as the gang congratulate themselves, the Mystery Machine goes backwards, prompting Fred to give chase before discovering that it was all just a dream.

As it turns out, Fred sold the Mystery Machine and they are retired from mystery solving, thanks to the local Sheriff. (Note: As seen in Scooby-Doo! and the Curse of the 13th Ghost.) Fred decides to come out of retirement after seeing a news report, though Shaggy and Scooby begrudgingly refuse, saying that they have been constantly taken for granted in all their mysteries. The pair make Fred, Daphne, and Velma promise never to solve another mystery. The gang decide to have a vacation and soon see a TV program featuring Elvira, who announces that Shaggy Rogers is the winner of a tropical vacation, much to Fred, Daphne and Velma's confusion and Shaggy and Scooby's delight. They have a brief encounter with the Sheriff who reminds them to not do any mystery-solving.

On the way to the island via ferry, Fred, Daphne, and Velma try to keep their promise as Shaggy and Scooby relax. After arriving, two greeters frightfully tell the gang to "Get Out" but are ignored by the gang as they go in a van to the resort. On the way, a clawed figure slashes a palm tree causing it to block the road, forcing the gang to go to the resort by foot while the van driver stays to repair his van.

Arriving at Moonstar Island Resort, they are reminded of Moonscar Island where they solved a mystery involving the zombies and Cat Creatures. Inside the resort, they meet the hotel manager Alan and the hotel staff, composed of Mona, Linda, Jack, and Bugbite Stubbs, who resemble the people the gang previously encountered on Moonscar. While enjoying the accommodations, a few zombies surprise Scooby and Shaggy, who make a run for it and hide in a cabinet, which ultimately leads to a cavern, complete with cat statues and monuments.

Soon, Shaggy and Scooby return to the hotel and barricade the door, as a group of zombies approach the hotel. Shaggy and Scooby give their permission for the others to solve mysteries again and the gang set a trap for the zombies. But the clawed figure, a black Were-Cat, knocks over a candelabra, setting fire to a curtain, which then causes the sprinkler system to douse the fire and melt the zombies' faces to reveal that they were the hotel staff in disguise. The gang discover that they actually are on Moonscar Island, which is doubling as a filming location. Alan confesses to the gang that he is a film director known as Alan Smithee, who wanted to make a scary movie after looking into Velma's unsolved mysteries blog. He also reveals that he sponsored the vacation for Shaggy to win, but states that he had no knowledge of the black werecat. Despite everything that happened, the gang offer to help Alan finish the movie. As filming continues, the gang meet Seaver, a stunt double for Fred, who has a monster truck version of the Mystery Machine. As the sun goes down, Velma heads into the forest wearing night-vision goggles but runs away when she sees a cluster of cats' eyes.

After Velma tells the others to make a run for their lives, they see a harmless-looking beige kitten coming out of the bushes, startling Scooby. Just as Shaggy assures Scooby that there is nothing to worry about, the kitten (fully grown in an instant) turns feral and roars like a tiger, scaring Shaggy as more cats attack. After the movie crew (except Alan and Seaver) hide, three were-cats appear. As the gang and Seaver run for the ferry, Alan crazily burns it. Fred, acting on impulse, rescues the Mystery Machine from being burned with the ferry. Fred tells the others to get in, but one of the cat creatures tries to grab Smithee's medallion, which is Simone's pendant.

The gang save Alan and the pendant and the cats and cat creatures pursue them back to the resort. After a wild chase, the gang hide in the cabinet Shaggy and Scooby hid in, leading them to the cavern where the were-cats tried to drain the gang's life force. They notice that there are a lot of holes in the cave, which gives Velma an idea. The three cat creatures enter the cavern, find the medallion, and place it on the pedestal in the light of the harvest moon. The light is reflected to a specific spot on the ground where the cat creatures dig until they find a chest that appears to be filled with gold coins, though its contents turn out to be Scooby Snacks covered in gold foil. The cats are attacked by the gang, disguised to resemble zombies, causing them to become scared and hide in one of the cave's holes.

The gang unmask the creatures, revealing them to be the greeters and the ferry captain. The trio intended to find Moonscar's treasure, using cat whistles to control the island cats to deter anyone who was getting too close. The fourth werecat (who attacked the van and tried to set a fire in the mansion) is implied to be a real monster and remains at large. After the police take the culprits away, Alan despairs that his movie does not have a finale.

Soon, the cats, now docile, enter the cave and dig a spot in the ground with Scooby's help, revealing another treasure chest. Alan opens it and sees real gold inside, and declares that he is done with movie business and is retiring with all the gold. The gang declare that they will continue solving mysteries. Though the sheriff arrives and berates the gang for solving mysteries again, he relents, allowing Mystery Inc. to return. Shaggy and Scooby, along with the six cats who dug up Moonscar's treasure, eat the gold foiled Scooby snacks.

== Voice cast ==
- Frank Welker as Scooby-Doo, Fred Jones
- Grey DeLisle as Daphne Blake
- Matthew Lillard as Shaggy Rogers
- Kate Micucci as Velma Dinkley
- Janell Cox as Cat Person, Sister Withers
- David Herman as Jack, Sheriff
- John Michael Higgins as Alan Smithee
- Dave B. Mitchell as Driver, Ferry Captain
- Cassandra Peterson as Elvira
- Roger Rose as Lead Cat Person, Narrator
- Travis Willingham as Seaver

== Reception ==
On Common Sense Media, Renee Longstreet rated it 2/5 stars, and wrote, "some scary creatures, peril in update to series classic."
