= Carl Steven =

American actor (1974–2011)

- Steven in 2009
- Born: Carlo Steven Krakoff; November 7, 1974; Glendale, California, U.S.
- Died: July 31, 2011 (aged 36); Tucson, Arizona, U.S.
- Occupation: Actor
- Years active: 1979–1996
- Spouse: Dawn Krakoff (m. 1998)
- Children: 1

Carlo Steven Krakoff (November 7, 1974 – July 31, 2011), professionally known as Carl Steven, was an American child actor. He was best known for his roles in Out of This World and Weird Science. He additionally portrayed young Spock in Star Trek III: The Search for Spock (1984), and voiced Fred Jones in A Pup Named Scooby-Doo (1988-1991).

== Early life ==
Steven was the middle of three boys born to Glenn and Cynthia Krakoff and was a native of Glendale, California in Los Angeles County.

== Career ==
As a child, Steven appeared in a number of television series and films, with recurring roles on Webster, Punky Brewster, Out of This World, and Weird Science.

Steven also appeared in Star Trek III: The Search for Spock (1984) as a young Spock (the first actor other than Leonard Nimoy to play the role in a live action portrayal), and in a minor role in Disney's Honey, I Shrunk the Kids (1989). He provided the voice of a young Fred Jones for four seasons on the Hanna-Barbera animated series A Pup Named Scooby-Doo, Steven became the first actor besides Frank Welker to do so.

His final acting credit was in the television series Weird Science, where he played a character named Matthew. He would appear in six episodes of the series until 1996 when he retired from acting.

== Personal life ==
Steven became addicted to prescription medications after a tonsillectomy, and stole to support his addiction. He married Dawn Krakoff in 1998; they remained married until his death in 2011. He had a son named Noah.

== Legal issues ==
In 2009, Steven was arrested for committing six armed robberies at several Walgreens stores and CVS Pharmacy stores. He was sentenced to 13 years in prison in 2010. He was scheduled to be released in 2023.

== Death ==
Steven died on July 31, 2011, at the age of 36, of a heroin overdose while in prison in Tucson, Arizona.

== Filmography ==
=== Film ===
Year	Title	Role	Notes
1984	Star Trek III: The Search for Spock	Young Spock	
1985	Teen Wolf	Whistle boy	
1988	A Night at the Magic Castle	Ruggles	
1989	Honey, I Shrunk the Kids	Thomas "Tommy" Pervis	
1990	Welcome Home, Roxy Carmichael	Kid #2 Throwing Buckeyes	
1994	White Angel	Kevin	final film role

=== Television ===
Year	Title	Role	Notes
1981	Little House on the Prairie	Jess Miles	1 episode
1982	Rosie: The Rosemary Clooney Story	Raphael	TV film
1983	Wait Till Your Mother Gets Home!	Unknown role	TV film
1983	Quincy, M.E.	Chris	1 episode
1983	Matt Houston	Young Matt	1 episode
1985	Snoopy's Getting Married, Charlie Brown	Pigpen, Franklin	Voice, TV special
1985	The Hugga Bunch	Andrew Severson	
1985	The Charlie Brown and Snoopy Show	Franklin	Voice, episode: "Sally's Sweet Babboo"
1986	Diff'rent Strokes	Kurt	1 episode
1986	Fluppy Dogs	Jamie Bingham	Voice, TV film
1987	Family Comedy Hour	Unknown role	TV special
1987	Punky Brewster	Joey Deaton	3 episodes
1987	Popeye and Son	Additional voices	Episode: "Split Decision/The Case of the Burger Burglar"
1988	Superman	Additional voices	1 episode
1988–91	A Pup Named Scooby-Doo	Fred Jones	Voice, 30 episodes
1993	The Wonder Years	Guy	1 episode
1994–96	Weird Science	Matthew	Recurring guest star; 4 episodes (final appearance)
