= Fred Jones (Scooby-Doo) =

Fictional character from Scooby-Doo

- Scooby-Doo character
- First appearance: "What a Night for a Knight"; Scooby-Doo, Where Are You!; September 13, 1969
- Created by: Joe Ruby; Ken Spears
- Designed by: Iwao Takamoto
- Voiced by: Frank Welker (1969–present); Carl Steven (young; 1988–1991); Scott Innes (2020); Zac Efron (2020); Pierce Gagnon (young; 2020–2022); Glenn Howerton (Velma; 2023–2024); (see below)
- Portrayed by: Freddie Prinze Jr. (2002; 2004); Ryan Vrba (2004; young); Robbie Amell (2009; 2010); Maxwell Jenkins (2027); (see below)

In-universe information
- Nickname: Freddie
- Gender: Male
- Significant other: Daphne Blake

Fred Herman Jones (Note: Fred has been called both Frederick and Fredward in different incarnations. His middle name was revealed in Aloha, Scooby-Doo!.) is a fictional cartoon character in the Scooby-Doo franchise, and one of the five main protagonists. Fred is a core member of Mystery Incorporated, a group of young people and their dog that solve paranormal mysteries, usually uncovering crimes in the process.

Fred debuted in the pilot episode of Scooby-Doo, Where Are You!, alongside the other core characters, Daphne Blake, Velma Dinkley, Shaggy Rogers, and Scooby-Doo. He was inspired by the title character of The Many Loves of Dobie Gillis.

Fred is noted for often taking the leadership role in the gang, as well as creating elaborate traps to capture the villains. Fred has been primarily voiced by Frank Welker since the character's inception in 1969.

== Creation ==
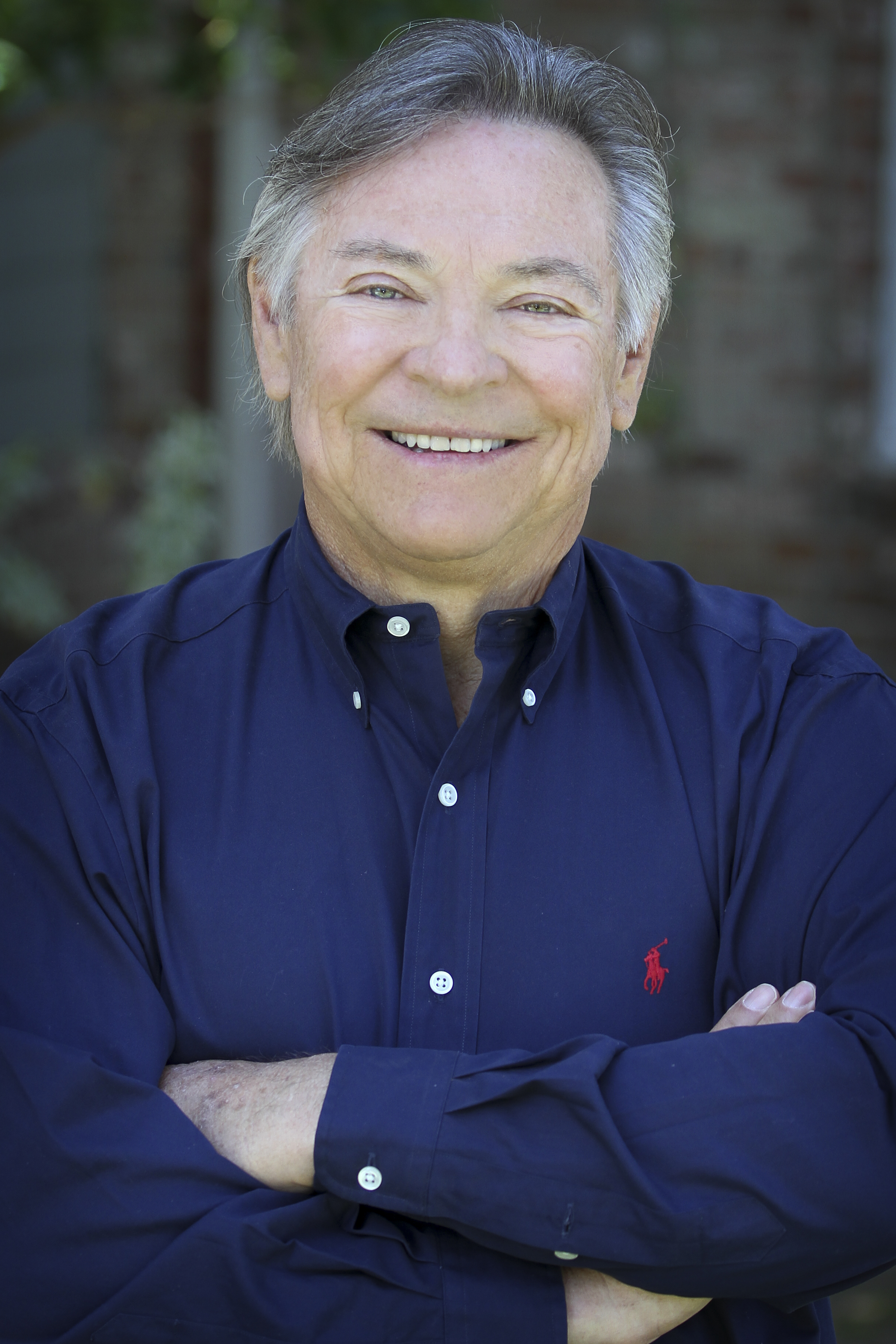
Frank Welker (pictured in 2016), Fred's original and longtime voice actor

Fred Jones was inspired by the titular character of the late 1950s/early 1960s American sitcom The Many Loves of Dobie Gillis, as played by Dwayne Hickman. Some network sales presentation art from an early version of Scooby-Doo, entitled Who's S-S-Scared?, featured early designs of Fred with brown hair.

In early drafts for the series, Mysteries Five, Fred was named Geoff and was a member of the titular crime-solving band. These aspects were dropped, with the character's name being changed to "Ronnie" when production for Scooby-Doo began in spring 1969. Fred Silverman, who was then head of daytime programming at CBS and a key member of the show's development team, ultimately gave Fred his name.

Frank Welker, a young comedian and impressionist, was asked by the network to audition for the voice of Fred, although he had originally intended to audition for first Scooby-Doo (whom he eventually did get to voice after Don Messick died in 1997) and later Shaggy (Casey Kasem, who was cast as Shaggy, had originally wanted to voice Fred). Being cast as Fred led to the start of a long, prolific career in voice work for Welker, with Scooby-Doo being his first voice acting job.

== Character description ==
Fred Jones is a core member of Mystery Incorporated, a group of young detectives that solve paranormal-related mysteries. Fred often initiates and leads the investigation, mostly pairing with Daphne to search for clues. He is known for constructing various Rube Goldberg traps for villains, which Scooby-Doo or Shaggy often set off by mistake, causing the villain to be captured in another way.

Fred, Daphne, and Velma were absent from the franchise at the start of the 1980s, with the focus turning to the comedy antics of Shaggy, Scooby-Doo and the newly introduced Scrappy-Doo. Daphne would be reintroduced, with the other two making sporadic appearances before their reintroduction.

In A Pup Named Scooby-Doo, a younger Fred was depicted as being somewhat less intelligent and often believed conspiracy theories and legends such as Bigfoot and mole people and read the tabloid magazine The National Exaggerator. In each episode, Fred would blame the crime on the neighborhood bully, Red Herring (a play on the idiom red herring). In What's New, Scooby-Doo?, the teenage version of Fred is shown to have many interests such as traps, martial arts, wrestling, and weightlifting.

In a 2012 Reddit r/IAmA, Shaggy Rogers actor Matthew Lillard additionally revealed that the original cut of the 2002 Scooby-Doo film had Fred be revealed to be gay (which is why he always wore an ascot tie), and that Freddie Prinze Jr. had portrayed him as such throughout the film.

In Scooby-Doo: Mystery Incorporated, Fred's interests are limited to "traps and solving mysteries", with head writer Mitch Watson stating that the character was written as "slightly on the spectrum [...]". He is oblivious to the affections of Daphne, but later he admits he has feelings for her and the pair date. It was revealed that Fred's father Fred Jones Sr. was not his biological father, but instead, a man who kidnapped him as a child and raised him as his own son. His biological parents were Brad Chiles and Judy Reeves, members of a previous incarnation of Mystery Incorporated. The pair later return as antagonists. In the series finale, the universe is restarted, erasing many previous events of the series lore, with Brad and Judy raising Fred.

=== Appearance ===
Fred most often wears a white and/or blue shirt and blue pants. In the original series, Fred wears an orange ascot tie with a blue shirt and white sweater. In the 1990s direct-to-video films, Fred generally wears a light blue shirt. In the 2002 series What's New, Scooby-Doo?, Fred's outfit was given an update, with his orange ascot being removed and a blue stripe added to his sweater.

== Performers ==
=== Voice actors ===
Frank Welker has voiced the character continuously since the original series in 1969. Carl Steven voiced a young version of the character in A Pup Named Scooby-Doo. Zac Efron portrayed the older version in Scoob!, with Pierce Gagnon voicing the young version in Scoob! and the cancelled Scoob! Holiday Haunt. Glenn Howerton voiced the character in the adult-oriented Velma.

=== Additional voice actors ===
- Norma MacMillan (Kenner Talking Show Projector record)
- Keith Scott (Pauls commercial)
- Chris Cox (Scooby-Doo 2: Monsters Unleashed: The Video Game)
- Jim Wise (Scooby-Doo! Music of the Vampire; singing voice)
- Scott Innes (McDonald's commercial, Scooby-Doo! Playmobil Mini Mysteries)

=== Parodies ===
- Freddie Prinze Jr. (Robot Chicken)
- Kevin Shinick (Mad)
- Brett Dalton (Robot Chicken)

=== Live-action portrayals ===
Fred Jones portrayals

Freddie Prinze Jr. as Fred in Scooby-Doo and Scooby-Doo 2: Monsters Unleashed.

Robbie Amell as Fred in Scooby-Doo! The Mystery Begins and Scooby-Doo! Curse of the Lake Monster.

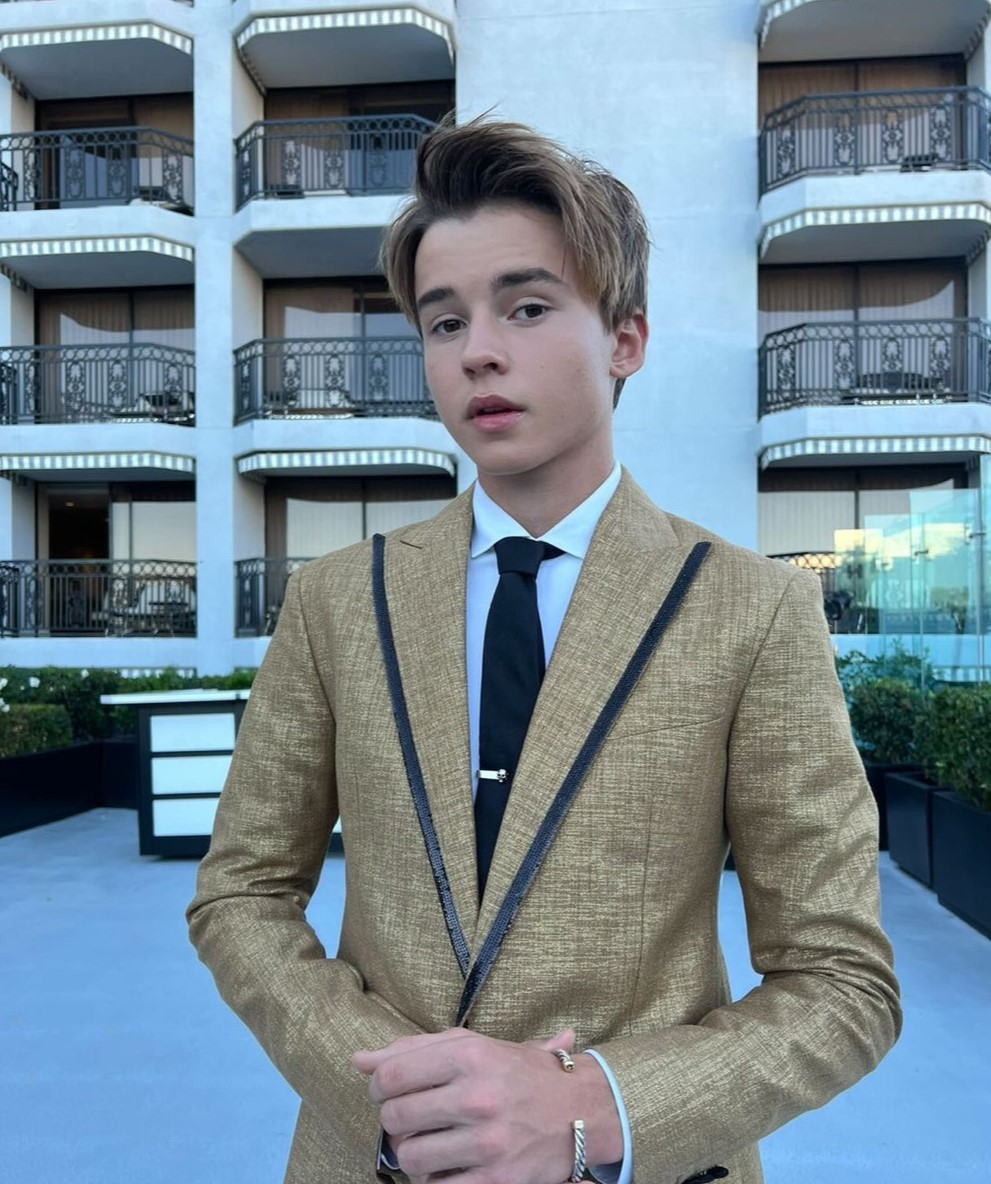
Maxwell Jenkins will portray the character in Scooby-Doo: Origins

Freddie Prinze Jr. portrayed the character in Scooby-Doo (2002) and Scooby-Doo 2: Monsters Unleashed (2004). Robbie Amell portrayed the character in Scooby-Doo! The Mystery Begins and Scooby-Doo! Curse of the Lake Monster. Maxwell Jenkins will portray the character in the upcoming Scooby-Doo: Origins.

==== Additional live-action portrayals ====
- Jerry Richardson (Scooby-Doo! in Stagefright - Live on Stage)
- Ryan Vrba (Young Fred in Scooby-Doo 2: Monsters Unleashed)
- Jamie Wilson (Scooby-Doo! and the Pirate Ghost - Live on Stage)
- Noah Michael Fish (Scooby-Doo Live! Musical Mysteries (2013))
- Josh Little (Scooby-Doo Live! The Mystery of the Pyramid)
- Chris Warner Drake (Scooby-Doo Live! Musical Mysteries (2016))
- Matthieu Levesque (2020; Scooby-Doo! and the Lost City of Gold)
- Connor Briggs (2022; Scooby-Doo! and the Lost City of Gold)

==== Parodies ====
- Marc Blucas (lookalike in Jay and Silent Bob Strike Back)
- Adam Tate as Chad (2012; Saturday Morning Mystery)
- Jake Gyllenhaal (Saturday Night Live)

== In other media ==
Fred appears in the Teen Titans Go! episode "Cartoon Feud", the Jellystone! episode "Frankenhooky", and Supernatural episode "Scoobynatural", along with parodies such as Family Guy and The Venture Bros.. Fred also appears in the 2021 film Space Jam: A New Legacy, with his SCOOB design. He appears as an NPC in Lego Dimensions, and as a skin in Fortnite.

Fred appears in many other Scooby-Doo videogames, books, comics, and other merchandise.
