= List of What's New, Scooby-Doo? episodes =

The following contains a list of episodes from the American animated mystery-comedy series What's New, Scooby-Doo?. The show was broadcast from September 14, 2002, to July 21, 2006, on Kids' WB, a Saturday morning children's programming block on The WB Television Network, across three 14-episode seasons, for a total of 42 episodes. This is the ninth incarnation of the Scooby-Doo franchise, and features the main characters – Fred Jones, Daphne Blake, Velma Dinkley, Shaggy Rogers, and Scooby-Doo – investigating appearances of supernatural creatures.

== Series overview ==
Season	Episodes	Originally released	
Season	Episodes	First released	Last released
1	14	September 14, 2002	March 22, 2003
2	14	September 13, 2003	March 27, 2004
3	14	January 29, 2005	July 21, 2006

== Episodes ==
=== Season 1 (2002–03) ===
No. overall	No. in season	Title	Directed by	Written by	Original release date
1	1	"There's No Creature Like Snow Creature"	Joe Sichta	Jim Krieg	September 14, 2002
The gang travels to a mountain resort for some skiing and to watch a snowboarding competition, but end up investigating rumors of a snow creature that is attacking the participants. However, when Velma comes down with a cold and Fred injures his leg, it's up to Scooby, Shaggy and Daphne to solve the mystery. Villain(s): The Snow Creature/Mystery Sneak (Avalanche Anderson) Motive: To win the Wilkinson Snowboarding Open to be famous again. Chase scene song: "It's a Rad, Rad World" by Sebastian Robertson
2	2	"3-D Struction"	Tim Maltby	Ed Scharlach	September 21, 2002
Daphne's uncle sends the gang to Costa Rica for the opening of a museum exhibit on dinosaurs. When they meet archaeologist Melbourne O'Reilly, he reveals the legend of a dinosaur spirit. So when the gang watch a dinosaur film in the museum's theatre, the dinosaur in the film jumps out of the screen and into the audience. It's up to the gang to figure out who's really behind this mystery. Villain(s): The Dinosaur Spirit/Luis Cepeda and Heather Lane Motive: To scare Melbourne O'Reilly and others away from gold. Chase scene song: "Güe - Güe - Güepa" by Chicos de Barrio
3	3	"Space Ape at the Cape"	Swinton O. Scott III	George Doty IV	September 28, 2002
While visiting NASA in Florida, a mysterious alien egg hatches. The gang must stop the alien before NASA's shuttle mission is aborted. Villain(s): The Alien/Janet Lawrence Motive: To get Janet's project to be delayed as it was not ready in time for the space shuttle mission. The Short Alien/Reggie the Chimp Motive: Janet trained him to do it. Chase scene song: "Music of America" by Poster Children
4	4	"Big Scare in the Big Easy"	Tom Mazzocco	George Doty IV, James Krieg and Ed Scharlach	October 5, 2002
The gang stays at a hotel next to a graveyard during their spring break in New Orleans. They soon realize that two Civil War ghosts re-enact a duel every night to scare away guests. Daphne is later kidnapped, so it's up to Fred, Velma, Shaggy and Scooby to find her and uncover the truth. Villain(s): The Ghosts of the Leland Brothers/Crawdad Mike and his bus driver Motive: To get more viewers for their graveyard tours. Chase scene song: "Man With the Hex" by The Atomic Fireballs (also used in the 2002 film.)
5	5	"It's Mean, It's Green, It's the Mystery Machine"	Joe Sichta	Mark Turosz	October 26, 2002
The Mystery Machine gains a life of its own and starts to drive by itself, so the gang tries searching for clues to figure out why. This leads them to the Mystery Kids, a band of talented kids who formerly owned the Mystery Machine. While trying to solve the mystery, the van rampages out of control all over town, and Shaggy and Fred nearly get arrested by a police officer. Villain(s): The Possessed Mystery Machine/Susan Dinwiddie Motive: It was part of a publicity stunt to gain attention for The Mystery Kids' comeback concert. Chase scene song: "I'd Do Anything" by Simple Plan Other songs: 2-Cute 4-Get by The Mystery Kids (Larc Spies and Lauren Tom)
6	6	"Riva Ras Regas"	Russell Calabrese and Swinton O. Scott III	Tom Sheppard	November 2, 2002
The gang wins a competition to go to Las Vegas to meet teen pop sensation Lindsay Pagano, who takes a liking to Fred, but they soon end up trying to uncover the mystery of a deceased magician named Rufus Raucous, whose ghost has risen from the grave to haunt the theatre that Lindsay is performing at. Though a twist occurs when the gang encounters the real Rufus Raucous. Villain(s): The Ghost of Rufus Raucous/Phylidia Flanders Motive: To replace Rufus Raucous. Chase scene song: "Here I Come Vegas" by Lindsay Pagano Other songs: Living in De Nile and Fruit of My Love by Lindsay Pagano
7	7	"Roller Ghoster Ride"	Scott Jeralds and Tim Maltby	Dwayne McDuffie	November 9, 2002
The crew goes to a very popular roller coaster park, when Shaggy and Scooby win a competition to design a hot roller coaster ride to construct and build for the park, but they end up running into some ride mischief with an ape-like ghost called the Roller Ghoster who wants to break all the rides for no apparent reason. Villain(s): The Roller Ghoster/Terry Motive: To take over Thrill Ride Park. Chase scene song: "Saying Goodbye" by The Muffs
8	8	"Safari, So Goodi!"	Tom Mazzocco	Ed Scharlach	November 23, 2002
On a safari hunt in Africa, the gang discovers that the animals are changing into a yellow color and doing strange things. They must solve the mystery fast, or else the same thing might happen to Scooby. Villain(s): The Jungle Demons/African animals hypnotized by Honey and Henry Hunsecker Motive: To collect exotic pets to rich people. Chase scene song: "Hatari Safari" by Rich Dickerson
9	9	"She Sees Sea Monsters by the Sea Shore"	Scott Jeralds and Joe Sichta	Jim Krieg	November 30, 2002
The gang goes on a trip to the island of Faja Manu where they spend their vacation and encounter a sea serpent known as Motoshondu. Villain(s): The Motoshondu Sea Serpent/Crunchy a.k.a. Charles Granville Motive: To protect the turtle's mating grounds. Chase scene song: "Rockaway Beach" by The Ramones
10	10	"A Scooby-Doo Christmas"	Scott Jeralds	Jonathan Collier, George Doty IV, James Krieg, Ed Scharlach	December 13, 2002
Scooby and his pals arrive in a town where Christmas isn't celebrated because a headless snowman terrorizes the residents, so the amateur sleuths set out to solve the mystery. Villain(s): The Headless Snowman/Professor Higginson Motive: To find gold. Chase scene song: "Santa Claus, Santa Claus" by Heavy Trevy
11	11	"Toy Scary Boo"	Russell Calabrese and Scott Jeralds	George Doty IV	February 1, 2003
The gang investigates a toy store where living toys are taking over. They suspect a really interested fanatic is involved in the case. Villain(s): The Living Toys/Officer Claphammer Motive: So no one can see him steal paintings from the museum. Chase scene song: "Scooby, Scooby-Doo" by Rich Dickerson
12	12	"Lights! Camera! Mayhem!"	Scott Jeralds and Tim Maltby	Jim Krieg	February 15, 2003
The gang gets VIP passes at a movie studio in Hollywood, California, where a remake of teen spy movie Spy Me a River is being filmed, only to be sabotaged by the Faceless Phantom, believed to be the ghost of the original film's leading star. Villain(s): The Faceless Phantom/Vincent Wong Motive: To stop producing Spy Me A River. Chase scene song: "I Don't Wanna Walk Around With You" by The Ramones
13	13	"Pompeii and Circumstance"	Scott Jeralds and Tom Mazzocco	Ed Scharlach	February 22, 2003
While visiting Pompeii in Italy, the gang battles an ancient zombie gladiator, who appears to be responsible for illegally dumping waste onto Mount Vesuvius. Villain(s): The Zombie Gladiator and the Ghost of Emperor Caesar Saladicus/Ugo DiRinaldi and Captain Guzman Motive: Illegally stealing artifacts from Italy and excavating them into Mount Vesuvius so they could be more land and sites of artifacts for Scungimondo Corporation to build on. Chase scene song: "Hai Capito" by Luciano Palermi, Raffaella Camera, and Rich Dickerson
14	14	"The Unnatural"	Scott Jeralds and Joe Sichta	George Doty IV	March 22, 2003
The gang goes to a baseball stadium to see Luis Santiago break the home run record, but the ghost of the record's former owner shows up, reluctant to see his record broken. Villain(s): The Baseball Specter/Bob Taylor Motive: To prevent Luis Santiago from breaking Cab Craig's record. Chase scene song: "Play My Game" by The Donnas

=== Season 2 (2003–04) ===
No. overall	No. in season	Title	Directed by	Written by	Original release date
15	1	"Big Appetite in Little Tokyo"	Scott Jeralds	Jim Krieg	September 13, 2003
After Velma wins a contest for the best invention, the gang travels to Tokyo, Japan. When a mystical person zaps a pizza with a monster-transformation spell, Shaggy eats it. Shaggy starts to grow into a Godzilla-like monster whenever he goes to sleep and he starts eating everything in sight. Shaggy then gets framed by the monster and everyone thinks Shaggy is the culprit. Now the gang is running around Tokyo trying to get away from the police, who want to capture Shaggy. Villain(s): The 30-Foot Shaggy/Professor Pomfrit Motive: To frame Shaggy and destroy Dr. Akira Onodera's Robotics Factory since Onodera is rich while Professor Pomfrit is a underpaid high school teacher. Dogbot Motive: Used by the professor to bit Shaggy's chain so he could be sent outside Dr. Onodera's guesthouse. Chase scene song: "Urei" by Puffy AmiYumi Note: This is the only episode to have a police chase. This is a parody of the film Big Trouble In Little China.
16	2	"Mummy Scares Best"	Joe Sichta	Ed Scharlach	September 20, 2003
While in Egypt on an archaeological dig with Melbourne O'Reilly, the gang encounters Pharaoh Scamses the XV – a mummy who has a knack of turning tourists into zombie minions. Later Fred, Daphne, and Velma get turned into zombies as well, leaving it up to Shaggy and Scooby to solve the mystery. Villain(s): The Mummy of Scamses XV and Zombie Tourists/Prince Qasel Al-Famir and Mademoiselle Chantal Motive: To divert water into Zalqara for Mademoiselle Chantal's businesses so they could be rich. Chase scene song: "Time Running" by Tegan and Sara
17	3	"The Fast and the Wormious"	Tom Mazzocco	Tom Sheppard	September 27, 2003
After Fred decides to try his hand at cross-country racing in Mexico, the gang is stuck with a giant worm, its fanatical worshipers and a racer who would resort to anything to win the race. This episode marks the first appearance of recurring character Gibby Norton. Villain(s): Gusano Grande/Gibby Norton's dune buggy Motive: To impress Velma. Chase scene song: "Punk Rock Y Subversion" by Los Miserables
18	4	"High-Tech House of Horrors"	Russell Calabrese	George Doty IV	October 4, 2003
The gang ends up going to a future fair in Omaha; however, the main attraction the house of the future is closed due to the mysterious disappearance of a teenager. The creator of the house, Professor Ostwald, tells the gang that nothing is wrong; however, after Daphne disappears, the gang has to go back to the house to search for her, but are soon locked in, along with the Blather Brothers and the celebrity TV star Horatio Hidalgo. Villain(s): Jeeves (J-31 Version 2.3)/Shari, the House Motive: To get attention. Chase scene song: "Another Way" by Paul van Dyk Note: This episode is called High-Tech House of The Future in DVDs and Digital media.
19	5	"The Vampire Strikes Back"	Tom Mazzocco	Jordana Arkin	October 18, 2003
The gang travels to an old Transylvanian castle on a rainy night to watch the shooting of the Hex Girls' new music video. When they arrive, they find out that the band is breaking up, since a vampire is on the loose. Fred decides to go straight to trapping the vampire. They do so, only for Fred to turn into a bat. It's up to Scooby and the gang to solve the mystery. Villain(s): The Fortescu Vampire/Steve and Stu Fortescu Motive: To protect their castle from new people coming in. Chase scene song: "Petrified Bride" by The Hex Girls (Jennifer Hale, Kimberly Brooks and Jane Wiedlin) Other songs: What's New, Scooby-Doo? by The Hex Girls (Jennifer Hale, Kimberly Brooks and Jane Wiedlin)
20	6	"A Scooby-Doo Halloween"	Swinton O. Scott III	Nahnatchka Khan	October 24, 2003
After the gang solves another mystery, they go to Banning Junction to visit Velma's family for Halloween, but they meet ghostly scarecrows who try to ruin the festivities. The gang attempts to save the town before the ghost of Hank Banning appears. Paul Stanley of Kiss guest stars. Villain(s): The Scarecrows and the Ghost of Hank Banning/Marcy Motive: To ruin Halloween since it overshadows her birthday. The Swamp Creature/Oldsie Motive: To steal money from the banks. Chase scene song: "Shout It Out Loud" by Kiss
21	7	"Homeward Hound"	Tim Maltby	Joseph Barbera and Tom Minton	October 25, 2003
After the gang votes on their next destination, they end up at the annual dog show, courtesy of Scooby. There, Shaggy runs into an old acquaintance, Meadow, and her dog, Milady Moonbeam. However, the gang then has an unpleasant run-in with a Cat Creature who seems bent on ruining the dog show and stealing the puppies of the former winner dog, Crissie. This episode marks the first appearance of the Secret Six puppies: Maize, Flax, Jingle, Knox, 14-Carat and Bling-Bling and their owner Mr. B. Villain(s): The Cat Creature/Meadow Motive: To stop the Secret Six from competing against M'Lady Moonbeam. Impostor Scooby-Doo/M'Lady Moonbeam Motive: Also to stop Secret Six from competing against him. Scar and Skull Motive: Hired by Meadow to Dognap the Secret Six Chase scene song: "Now I Wanna Be a Good Boy" by The Ramones
22	8	"The San Franpsycho"	Tae Ho Han and Tim Maltby	Bill Canterbury	March 20, 2004
The gang goes to the Grind Games in San Francisco to meet an old friend, Ryan Sheckler, who is participating. However, they soon find out that the games are being terrorized by the San Franpsycho, the ghost of a former Alcatraz inmate. Villain(s): The San Franpsycho/Rutie Banez Motive: To sabotage The Grind Games since she was not allowed in the games. Chase scene song: "Doing Time" by MxPx
23	9	"Simple Plan and the Invisible Madman"	Swinton O. Scott III	George Doty IV	March 22, 2004
In Quebec, Canada, the gang runs into Simple Plan while en route to the Montreal Rock Festival. When both their vans become wrecked, they have to spend the night at a nearby ghost town. It soon becomes obvious that something invisible is out to get Simple Plan, and even worse for Velma, Gibby Norton is also present in the ghost town. Villain(s): The Invisible Madman/Zeke Zillion, Gibby Norton, Eve De La Faye, Jack Hunter Motive: To replace Simple Plan as the band at The Montreal Rock Festival. Chase scene song: "You Don't Mean Anything" by Simple Plan Other songs: "The Worst Day Ever" by Simple Plan
24	10	"Recipe for Disaster"	Tom Mazzocco	Bill Culverius	March 23, 2004
After Shaggy wins a trip to the Scooby Snack Factory, the gang prepares for a well-deserved holiday. Unfortunately, there's very high security in the factory due to spies and, worst of all, a monster covered in Scooby Snack batter is scaring away the workers. Villain(s): The Scooby Snack Monster/Penelope Bailey Motive: To keep The Scooby Snacks Factory Recipe safe. The Fake Scooby Snack Monster/Trudy Lowe Trudy's Motive: To steal the factory's recipe for a rival factory. Chase scene song: "Sabre Dance" by Love Sculpture
25	11	"Large Dragon at Large"	Tim Maltby	Tom Sheppard	March 24, 2004
In the middle of a Renaissance fair in Scotland, a dragon starts terrorizing everyone. Villain(s): The Glasburgh Dragon/Jamison Steven Ripley Motive: To find treasure. Chase scene song: "The Ghosts of Me and You" by Less Than Jake Other songs: Dragon song by Rob Paulsen and Jess Harnell
26	12	"Uncle Scooby and Antarctica"	Russell Calabrese	Jim Krieg	March 25, 2004
While trying to bring a penguin named Little Pete back to Antarctica, the gang stumbles upon a fish-like creature that has imprisoned a professor under the ice. Villain(s): The Finned Fiend/Monroe Hopper Motive: To protect Dr. Armand Zola's experiment Chase scene song: "Southbound" by MxPx
27	13	"New Mexico, Old Monster"	Tim Maltby	Ed Scharlach	March 26, 2004
An ancient bird kidnaps locals from a Native American reservation in New Mexico, where Shaggy, Scooby, and the gang visit Shaggy's old friend, Jimmy Proudwolf and his dog, Shooby. Shaggy is about to enter a contest with a sculpture he made of Scooby's head, but the bird steals it, right before kidnapping Daphne. Villain(s): The Wakumi Bird and The Fake Shaman/Colonel Henry Thornwald Motive: To keep citizens away from a government project and promote false legends about the Wakumi Bird. Chase scene song: "No Control" by Blackfire
28	14	"It's All Greek to Scooby"	Russell Calabrese	George Doty IV	March 27, 2004
Whilst vacationing in Greece, Shaggy's purchase of a mysterious amulet only serves to cause a centaur to chase him. Villain(s): The Centaur/Susie Smythe Motive: To claim the discovery of Atlantis for herself. Note: This episode is also called It's All Greek to Scooby-Doo. Chase scene song: "Sahara" by Mikro

=== Season 3 (2005–06) ===
No. overall	No. in season	Title	Directed by	Written by	Original release date
29	1	"Fright House of a Lighthouse"	Chuck Sheetz	George Doty IV	January 29, 2005
When the gang stays with Fred's uncle in Wisconsin, they attempt to unmask the ghost of a lighthouse keeper who is causing havoc to local ships. In addition, one of the ships the keeper sank has returned as a ghost ship. Villain(s): The Creepy Keeper/Verona Dempsey Motive: To let Verona's shipments into the town, while letting other ships crash and drown. The Dauntless Skeleton Crew/Crusty McPeet Motive: To find treasure of the dauntless. Chase scene song: "High Five" by Calibretto 13
30	2	"Go West, Young Scoob"	Chuck Sheetz	Ed Scharlach	February 5, 2005
The gang travels to an old western town, Cyber Gulch, where the robot residents have spiraled out of control. Also, Velma has another run-in with Gibby Norton. Villain(s): Cold Steel and the Robot Bandits/Sheriff Lawman and Gibby Norton Motive: To impress Velma with Gibbyland while Sheriff Lawman wants to be the town's hero Chase scene song: "Haven't Been Me In a While" by CIV
31	3	"A Scooby-Doo Valentine"	Chuck Sheetz	Nahnatchka Khan	February 11, 2005
Shortly after returning to their hometown, the gang investigates some mysterious disappearances of teenagers on Lovers Lane, while Shaggy and Scooby catch up with old girlfriends, but the culprits behind it all appear to be the gang themselves! The gang sets up a decoy to catch the true culprits to avoid going to jail. Villain(s): The Evil Mystery Inc. Clones/J.C. Chasez and henchmen Motive: He was jealous of Shaggy and all the attention he received. Chase scene song: "Walk on the Wire" by Sahara Hotnights
32	4	"Wrestle Maniacs"	Chuck Sheetz	Chris Brown	February 12, 2005
Fred enters a wrestling competition that is haunted by the ghost of a former wrestler, now a contorted mutant known as "the Titanic Twist". Villain(s): The Titanic Twist/Curt and Connie Crunch Motive: To scare their father out of wrestling. Chase scene song: "All Twisted" by CIV
33	5	"Ready to Scare"	Chuck Sheetz	Matt Wayne	February 19, 2005
The gang heads to Paris to see Daphne's cousin Danika LeBlake win "Model of the Year," but they discover that she's been abducted by a gargoyle from the Notre Dame cathedral that has come to life. Villain(s): The Gargoyle/Guy L'Avorton and Danika LeBlake Motive: The fashion show was too much for Danika. Chase scene songs: "Nonchalant" by Chapeaumelon and "Ça plane pour moi" by Plastic Bertrand
34	6	"Farmed and Dangerous"	Chuck Sheetz	Jordana Arkin	February 26, 2005
The gang goes to visit Mr. B and the Secret Six puppies on their new farm, but soon discovers that a demon farmer is haunting their farm, which was built over an ancient graveyard, and wants the puppies gone. It's up to Scooby and the gang to unravel the mystery. Villain(s): The Demon Farmer/Farmer P alias Neville Poppenbacher Motive: To break into Mr. B's lab and steal his popcorn-on-the-cob formula. Chase scene song: "Something's Going On" by A
35	7	"Diamonds Are a Ghoul's Best Friend"	Chuck Sheetz	Bill Canterbury	March 5, 2005
The gang heads to Russia to see the U.S. ice hockey team play against Russia for the Emperor Cup, but they encounter the ghost of a former Russian hockey player who has stolen the trophy and now haunts the stadium. Brett Hull guest stars. Villain(s): The Frozen Fiend/Galina Korzhakov Motive: To get the diamonds in the emperor's cup. Chase scene song: "I'll Search Forever" by Rich Dickerson
36	8	"A Terrifying Round with a Menacing Metallic Clown"	Chuck Sheetz	Chris Brown	March 12, 2005
Shaggy competes in a mini-golf tournament that a giant metallic clown terrorizes. In a surprising twist of events, Shaggy, driven by his desire to win the tournament, faces the monster boldly and it's Velma, who is scared of clowns (after a traumatic birthday experience), who ends up being frightened by the monster and must face her fears to solve the mystery. Villain(s): The Menacing Metallic Clown/Mayor Snipper Motive: To ruin mini golf since Shaggy won the tournament long ago and ruined his son Gary's life. Chase scene song: "Something Special" by CIV Note: This episode's flashback to Mystery Inc.'s younger years is done as a homage to the predecessor series, A Pup Named Scooby-Doo. Velma's statement over hockey is a reference to the previous episode 'Diamonds Are A Ghoul's Best Friend'
37	9	"Camp Comeoniwannascareya"	Joe Sichta	George Doty IV	March 19, 2005
Scooby and Shaggy go to a summer camp to volunteer, unaware that the camp is haunted by a slimy creature known as the Toxic Terror. Villain(s): The Toxic Terror/Gray Motive: To stop Clyde from turning Camp Kichikaha into a resort for adults. Chase scene song: "Stronger" by Taxiride Note: This is the only episode where Daphne, Velma, and Fred do not appear, although Fred's name is mentioned.
38	10	"Block-Long Hong Kong Terror"	Chuck Sheetz	Ed Scharlach	March 26, 2005
The gang travels to Hong Kong so that Shaggy can get his rubber duck repaired, while the city is terrorized by a Chinese dragon who has stolen an expensive ring. Things get even worse when the dragon consistently chases after the gang while they try to solve the mystery. Villain(s): The Hong Kong Dragon/Wu and the Acrobats Motive: To steal an expensive ring and scare Shaggy and Scooby out of town. Chase scene song: "Hong Kong Holiday" by E.G. Daily
39	11	"Gentlemen, Start Your Monsters!"	Chuck Sheetz	Bill Canterbury	April 2, 2005
Fred competes in a car race, with the rest of the gang as his pit crew. However, none of them realize that it involves a skeleton racer driving a monster truck. Villain(s): The Skeleton Racer/Jimmy and Cindy Motive: To sabotage The Gainsville 500 as they were not allowed in the race. Chase scene song: "Hot" by Smash Mouth
40	12	"Gold Paw"	Chuck Sheetz	Chris Brown	April 9, 2005
Once again, the gang visits the Secret Six puppies at Fort Knox, but comes to discover that a creature made of gold is haunting the place, turning everything he touches into solid gold. Meanwhile, Shaggy and Scooby do everything in their power to keep the Gold-Ade factory open. Villain(s): The Gold Monster/Drill Sergeant Payne Motive: To get out of Fort Knox and take over The Gold-Ade Factory. Chase scene song: "Pressing On" by Relient K
41	13	"Reef Grief!"	Chuck Sheetz	Ed Scharlach	April 16, 2005
Shaggy and Scooby enter a sandcastle building competition in Australia, but later discover that a monster made from coral is on the loose and the builders are disappearing under the sand. Steve Harwell of Smash Mouth guest stars. Villain(s): Rama Yam alias Spencer Johnson Motive: He hypnotized beach goers to make an underground tunnel to New Guinea. Chase scene song: "New Planet" by Smash Mouth Other songs: Fun by Smash Mouth Note: This is the only episode where the monster in question is not a villain in disguise.
42	14	"E-Scream"	Chuck Sheetz	George Doty IV	February 21, 2006 (DVD); July 21, 2006 (Cartoon Network)
Velma plans to relax while the rest of the gang takes part in a video game convention in Los Angeles, but soon finds she has to contend with a virtual-simulation game come to life. Villain(s): The Osomons/Video game Chase scene song: "Holiday" by Otherstarpeople Note: This is the first episode where there is no unmasking of the villain as the Osomons were not real monsters but technological creations.
