= Inside a Dream =

Inside a Dream may refer to:

- Inside a Dream (EP), a 2017 EP by Echosmith
- "Inside a Dream" (song), a 1988 song by Jane Wiedlin
- "Inside a Dream", a 2013 song by Pet Shop Boys
