= Tangled (Jane Wiedlin album) =

Studio album by Jane Wiedlin
- Released: May 30, 1990
- Recorded: 1989–1990
- Genre: Pop rock, new wave
- Length: 45:26
- Label: EMI
- Producer: Peter Collins (all tracks); Andy Hill (track 9)

Jane Wiedlin chronology
Fur (1988)	Tangled (1990)	Kissproof World (2000)

Tangled is the third studio album by Jane Wiedlin, released in 1990 on EMI Records. It was also her third solo album after leaving rock group The Go-Go's. The album was produced by Peter Collins, with the track "99 Ways" being co-produced with Andy Hill.

== Background ==
After the American Top 10 success of the 1988 single "Rush Hour" from the album Fur, Tangled took two years to complete and upon release failed to gain any commercial success and sold poorly, which in turn eventually led to Wiedlin's departure from EMI Records. Wiedlin would later state that this was largely due to EMI who failed to promote it. The album was supported by a Summer tour, with plans for the tour being announced as early as May 1990.

Two singles were released from the album. The leading and main single "World on Fire," was released with a semi-controversial music video. The single was issued in America, Japan and Italy. The second single was the promotional-only American single "Guardian Angel", which aimed solely at radio airplay. It was issued as a one-track promo picture CD with custom back insert and remains scarce today.

The title track "Tangled" would appear in the 1990 romantic comedy film Pretty Woman. It would be included on the film's soundtrack album release in January 1990.

In the August 1990 issue of the Orange Coast Magazine, Wiedlin spoke of the song "Paper Heart", which was written by Wiedlin, Cyndi Lauper and Richard Orange: "It was sort of a song written by mail, more or less. I'd gotten a demo of the song in the mail and felt that it was real strong. She'd written it with another writer, but I wasn't that happy with the lyrics. I usually don't feel very comfortable singing other people's lyrics anyway. It's difficult to bring the right emotion into it. So, I asked them how they'd feel about me rewriting the lyrics, and they said, 'Go ahead and try, and we'll let you know what we think.' So I did, and they seemed to think the lyrics were OK. I recorded it, and I think the song came out great. You can't tell that it wasn't written at the same time." The song's lyrics, written by Wiedlin, were inspired by Wiedlin learning that her former best friend, who she was no longer in contact with, had become a heroin addict.

Later in a September 12, 1996 article in the Los Angeles Times, writer Jon Matsumoto revealed that the album had left Wiedlin "bitter" about the music industry. The album took two years to complete, and after the shooting of an "extravagant" music video", Wiedlin felt that EMI Records failed to properly promote the album. She commented: "It left such a bad taste in my mouth. It was, 'I can't handle this anymore.' I know [losing label support] happens to people all the time and there's nothing you can really do about it. Luckily, I had the [financial] luxury where I didn't really have to do anything. Then after a couple of years of floating around, I started thinking about doing music again and started writing songs."

== Critical reception ==
Professional ratings
Review scores
Source	Rating
AllMusic	2/5 stars
Orange Coast Magazine	favorable
Chicago Tribune	3.5/4 stars
Los Angeles Times	2.5/4 stars
Daily News	favorable
The Albany Herald	favorable
Rocky Mountain News	A
Worcester Telegram Gazette	2/5 stars
Newsday	favorable
San Jose Mercury News (CA)	3.5/5 stars

Upon release, Orange Coast described the album was Wiedlin's "best individual project to date" and singled out "Paper Heart" as the best track. Caitlin O'Connor Creevy of the Chicago Tribune commented on the Wiedlin's "distinct tone" and "an almost ethereal uniqueness to that familiar Go-Go's beat". She felt Tangled was "more mature and considerably less bubble-gummy, bop-'til-you-droppy than that of the now-defunct girls band." Mike Boehm of the Los Angeles Times felt that half the album was "slick and over-sweet", adding it was more successful when Wiedlin "set[s] her fragile, Cyndi Lauper sound-alike voice in more intimate ballad surroundings."

David Dishneau, reviewing the album for the Daily News, commented: "Wiedlin was largely responsible for everything that was good about the Go-Gos. On Tangled, her second solo project, she builds on that reputation. The 10 selections lean toward bouncy, guitar-driven pop with engaging female harmonies that recall such 1980s Go-Gos hits as "Our Lips are Sealed" and "We've Got the Beat." Newsday writer John Anderson felt the album had Wiedlin creating "pop rooted in '60s guitar rock and ringing with defiant optimism". He summarised the album as "persistent and irresistible". San Jose Mercury News described the album as "gracefully engaging pop, setting Wiedlin's pixie trill amid brisk, simple waves of guitar".

Alex Henderson of AllMusic was critical of the album. He commented: "Although a decent musician, Wiedlin doesn't have much of a voice - and her inadequacy as a singer is made all the more obvious by the pedestrian nature of the songs. None of this sugary, girlish pop-rock begins to compare with the Go-Gos' triumphs - or even Carlisle's solo projects."

== Track listing ==
Side one
No.	Title	Writer(s)	Length
1.	"Rain on Me"	Jane Wiedlin, Robin Hild, Kevin Hunter, Peter Collins	5:28
2.	"At the End of the Day"	Mark Tibenham, Anton McIlwain	4:04
3.	"Guardian Angel"	Wiedlin, Scott Cutler, Dennis Morgan	4:38
4.	"Flowers on the Battlefield"	Wiedlin, Mark Goldenberg	4:24
5.	"Tangled"	Wiedlin, Cutler	4:45

Side two
No.	Title	Writer(s)	Length
6.	"World on Fire"	Wiedlin, Cutler, Terry Hall, Valerie Block	3:42
7.	"Paper Heart"	Wiedlin, Cyndi Lauper, Richard Orange	4:33
8.	"Big Rock Candy Mountain"	Wiedlin, Larry Tagg	4:25
9.	"99 Ways"	Wiedlin, Chris Thompson, Andy Hill	4:35
10.	"Euphoria"	Wiedlin, Paul Gordon	4:52

== Personnel ==
- Jane Wiedlin – vocals
- Nik Kershaw – bass guitar, backing vocals (on "Big Rock Candy Mountain")
- Tim Pierce – guitar
- Steve Ferrera – drums, percussion
- Barbara Gaskin – backing vocals
- Andy Reynolds – keyboards

Additional Musicians

- Mark Goldenberg – guitar (on "Flowers on the Battlefield")
- Steve Bloomfield – guitar (on "Big Rock Candy Mountain")
- Herbie Flowers – bass guitar (on "Big Rock Candy Mountain")
- Claire Torrey, Elizabeth Lamers, Gail Lennon, Mary Cassidy, Miriam Stockley, Tessa Niles, The Amorphous Choir – backing vocals (on "Euphoria")
- Graham Preskett – fiddle (on "Euphoria")
- Rick Biddulph – Twelve-String Guitar, Bouzouki [Bazookis] (on "Euphoria")

Production

- Peter Collins – producer
- Phil Chapman – engineer and mixer
- Andy Reynolds – engineer and mixing assistant
- Gary Hellman – engineer and mixing assistant
- John Luongo – engineer and mixing assistant
- Jeffrey Benet Hall – arranger on "Guardian Angel"
- Scott Cutler – arranger on "Guardian Angel"
- Barbara Gaskin – backing vocal arrangements
- Nik Kershaw – backing vocal arrangements on "Big Rock Candy Mountain"
- Annee Griffiths – choir coordinator on "Euphoria"
- Xavier Guardans – photography
- Vivid Information Design – design and art direction
