= Jane Wiedlin (album) =

Studio album by Jane Wiedlin
- Released: September 23, 1985
- Recorded: 1985
- Studios: The Complex (Los Angeles); Music Grinder (Los Angeles); One on One (Los Angeles); Soundcastle (Los Angeles); Conway (Los Angeles); Capitol (Los Angeles)
- Genres: Pop rock; new wave
- Length: 45:23
- Label: I.R.S.
- Producers: George Massenburg; Bill Payne; Russ Kunkel; Vince Ely

Jane Wiedlin chronology
Jane Wiedlin (1985)	Fur (1988)

Singles from Jane Wiedlin
- 1. "Blue Kiss" Released: September 9, 1985

Jane Wiedlin is the debut studio album by American musician Jane Wiedlin, released on September 23, 1985 by I.R.S. Records. It was her first solo album after leaving the rock band the Go-Go's. The track "My Traveling Heart" dealt with Wiedlin's feelings about the breakup of the group.

"Blue Kiss" was released as the lead single, reaching number 77 on the Billboard Hot 100 and number 30 on the Hot Dance Club Play chart. The album itself reached number 127 on the Billboard 200.

== Critical reception ==
Professional ratings
Review scores
Source	Rating
AllMusic	4.5/5 stars
The Village Voice	C+

Reviewing Jane Wiedlin for Rolling Stone, Joyce Millman found that Wiedlin "continues to wage a perky war against superficiality" and "still displays a dexterous touch with a scalpel when it comes to dissecting relationships", while musically, "Wiedlin's taste for the offbeat and her punchy pop know-how as well as the record's pinball-arcade bustle of guitars, synths and sound effects ... keep things fizzing." Robert Christgau was less impressed in The Village Voice, writing, "All you cool folks who thought the Go-Go's were airheads, not to mention all you airheads who thought the Go-Go's were cool, will find these troubled relationships and geopolitical concerns very educational. I thought the Go-Go's were more educational pretending to be airheads, not to mention sisters."

In a retrospective review, Stewart Mason of AllMusic stated that "aside from the unfortunately slick mid-'80s production", Jane Wiedlin "is probably the best solo album by any ex-member of the Go-Go's ... The singles 'Modern Romance' and 'Blue Kiss' really should have been hits (they're certainly better than most of Belinda Carlisle's solo work), and the best of the album tracks trade the pertness of the Go-Go's for a slightly more mature, world-weary vibe."

== Track listing ==
Side one
No.	Title	Writer(s)	Length
1.	"Blue Kiss"	Randell Kirsch; Jane Wiedlin	3:27
2.	"Goodbye Cruel World"	Wiedlin; Michael Lord	3:49
3.	"Sometimes You Really Get on My Nerves"	Wiedlin; Lord	3:36
4.	"East Meets West"	Wiedlin	3:36
5.	"Somebody's Going to Get into This House"	Kirsch	3:43
6.	"Forever"	Wiedlin; Lord	5:08

Side two
No.	Title	Writer(s)	Length
7.	"Modern Romance"	Wiedlin; George Kieffer	5:15
8.	"I Will Wait for You"	Kevin Hunter	3:47
9.	"One Hundred Years of Solitude"	Wiedlin	4:43
10.	"Where We Can Go"	Wiedlin; Hunter	4:12
11.	"My Traveling Heart"	Wiedlin	4:07
