= Blue Kiss =

Single by Jane Wiedlin

from the album Jane Wiedlin
- B-side: "My Traveling Heart"
- Released: September 9, 1985
- Recorded: 1984
- Studio: The Complex (Los Angeles)
- Genre: New wave; pop rock
- Length: 3:27
- Label: I.R.S.
- Songwriters: Randell Kirsch; Jane Wiedlin
- Producers: George Massenburg; Bill Payne; Russ Kunkel

Jane Wiedlin singles chronology
"Cool Places" (1983)	"Blue Kiss" (1985)	"Rush Hour" (1988)

Music video
- "Blue Kiss" on YouTube

"Blue Kiss" is the debut solo single by American musician Jane Wiedlin. Written by Wiedlin and American singer-songwriter Randell Kirsch, the song is from Wiedlin's 1985 self-titled debut album and is her first solo single after her departure from the rock band the Go-Go's. It reached No. 77 on the Billboard Hot 100 and No. 30 on the Hot Dance Club Play chart.

The 7-inch single was backed by the parent album's closing track "My Traveling Heart", a Celtic-flavored ballad that deals with Wiedlin's feelings about the breakup of the Go-Go's. An extended 12-inch single was also released, featuring an instrumental version of "Blue Kiss", along with two extended dance versions, one of which was remixed by English musician William Orbit.

Two music videos were produced for the song – one was not released, while the other features Wiedlin playing her guitar and singing in the back of a truck traveling a back-road.

"Blue Kiss" can be heard during the frat house party scene in the film Night of the Creeps (1986), and was used during the date montage scene in the sci-fi indie film The iDol (2007).

== Track listing ==
7"

1. "Blue Kiss" (Randell Kirsch, Jane Wiedlin) – 3:27
2. "My Traveling Heart" (Wiedlin) – 4:07

12" Maxi

1. "Blue Kiss (Special Dance Version)" – 6:30 (mixed by John "Tokes" Potoker)
2. "Blue Kiss ("V" Mix)" – 6:12 (mixed by Vince Ely)
3. "Blue Kiss (Instrumental)" – 4:18 (mixed by John "Tokes" Potoker)

UK 12"

1. "Blue Kiss (Dance Mix)"
2. "Blue Kiss (Instrumental)"
3. "My Traveling Heart"

== Chart positions ==
Chart	Peak position
U.S. Billboard Hot 100	77
U.S. Billboard Hot Dance Club Play	30
Canada Top Singles (RPM)	62
US Cash Box Top 100 Singles	74
