= Lindsay Pagano =

American singer (born 1986)

- Born: June 22, 1986 (age 40); Philadelphia, Pennsylvania, U.S.
- Genres: Pop rock, pop, R&B
- Occupation: Singer-songwriter
- Instrument: Vocals
- Years active: 2001–present
- Labels: Warner Bros; Let's Hear It
- Website: bighouselive.com

Lindsay Megan Pagano (born June 22, 1986) is an American singer who until 2003 was signed to Warner Bros. Records. She toured with Dream Street and Aaron Carter for several months. She also performed for the governor of California along with the Eagles and the Backstreet Boys.

She is mostly known for her 2001 song "Everything U R", which was originally on an AOL commercial before being the theme song for the WB show Maybe It's Me. She was signed to represent Reebok. Pagano stated in a 2004 interview with Vainquer Teens Magazine that she was in the process of recording a new album, but did not release any new material until 2008.

She appeared as a cartoon version of herself in the What's New, Scooby-Doo? episode "Riva Ras Regas", originally aired on Kids' WB on November 2, 2002. She performed three songs. In 2002, she became known as the AOL Girl due to her song being picked for their national commercials.

Pagano signed up as the first artist on the Matrix's label Let's Hear It Records, but the label closed before Pagano released any of her material.

In 2009, Pagano began to release new songs via YouTube. In 2014, she announced on Twitter that she auditioned for the sixth season of The Voice. She performed on the show under Team Shakira for 3 episodes. As of 2021 Lindsay Pagano is became a member of the Big House Band, performing along the East coast of the United States.

== The Voice ==
On the third episode of the Blind Auditions broadcast on March 3, 2014, she performed Labelle's song "Lady Marmalade." Only Shakira turned her chair, thus she defaulted to Team Shakira.

Stage	Song	Original Artist	Date	Order	Result
Blind Audition	"Lady Marmalade"	Labelle	March 3, 2014	3.10	Shakira turned Defaulted to Team Shakira
Battles, Round 1	"I Feel the Earth Move" (vs. Ddendyl)	Carole King	March 18, 2014	9.4	Defeated

== Discography ==
=== Albums ===
- Love & Faith & Inspiration (2001)
1. "Everything U R"
2. "Love & Faith & Inspiration"
3. "Cryin' Shame"
4. "Romeo"
5. "Dreams Like This"
6. "Amazing High"
7. "It Doesn't Get Any Better"
8. "Burning in Me"
9. "Number One (With A Bullet)"
10. "So Bad" (featuring Paul McCartney)
11. "Love & Faith & Inspiration" (Reprise)

=== Singles ===
2001

- "Everything U" (2001)

1. "Everything U R"
2. "Everything U R" (Philly Mix)
3. "Burning in Me"

2009

- "I Gotta Stop" (Radio Only)
