= Frosted (band) =

American pop punk band (1995–1998)

froSTed
- Origin: USA
- Genres: Pop punk
- Years active: 1995–1998
- Label: DGC
- Past members: Jane Wiedlin; Brian Waters; Sean Demott; Lance Porter / Chuck Bernal

Frosted (stylized as froSTed) was an American pop punk band, founded by ex-Go-Go's guitarist and singer Jane Wiedlin in 1995. The band was so-named because "it sounds sweet". The letters S and T were capitalized in tribute to Star Trek, one of Wiedlin's favorite TV shows. They released one album in 1996.

== History ==
Wiedlin was joined by a second guitarist, Brian Waters, Sean Demott on bass and Lance Porter (of Ex-Idols) on drums. All three men provided additional vocals.

Frosted began by playing live in Los Angeles and San Francisco, before their sole album Cold, co-produced with Marc Waterman, was issued in August 1996. It was not a commercial success but was well received by critics. Allmusic describes the album as "bright, chunky, and radio-friendly without being gooey mainstream glop".

Rachel Haden was credited with singing, while a guesting Gerri Sutyak played cello. Four songs on the album were co-written with fellow Go Go's guitarist Charlotte Caffey.

The tracks "Bed" and "Call Me Crazy" were released as a single.

Frosted's last show was at 14 Below in Santa Monica, on 31 March 1998.
