= Scooby-Doo and Guess Who? =

American animated television series

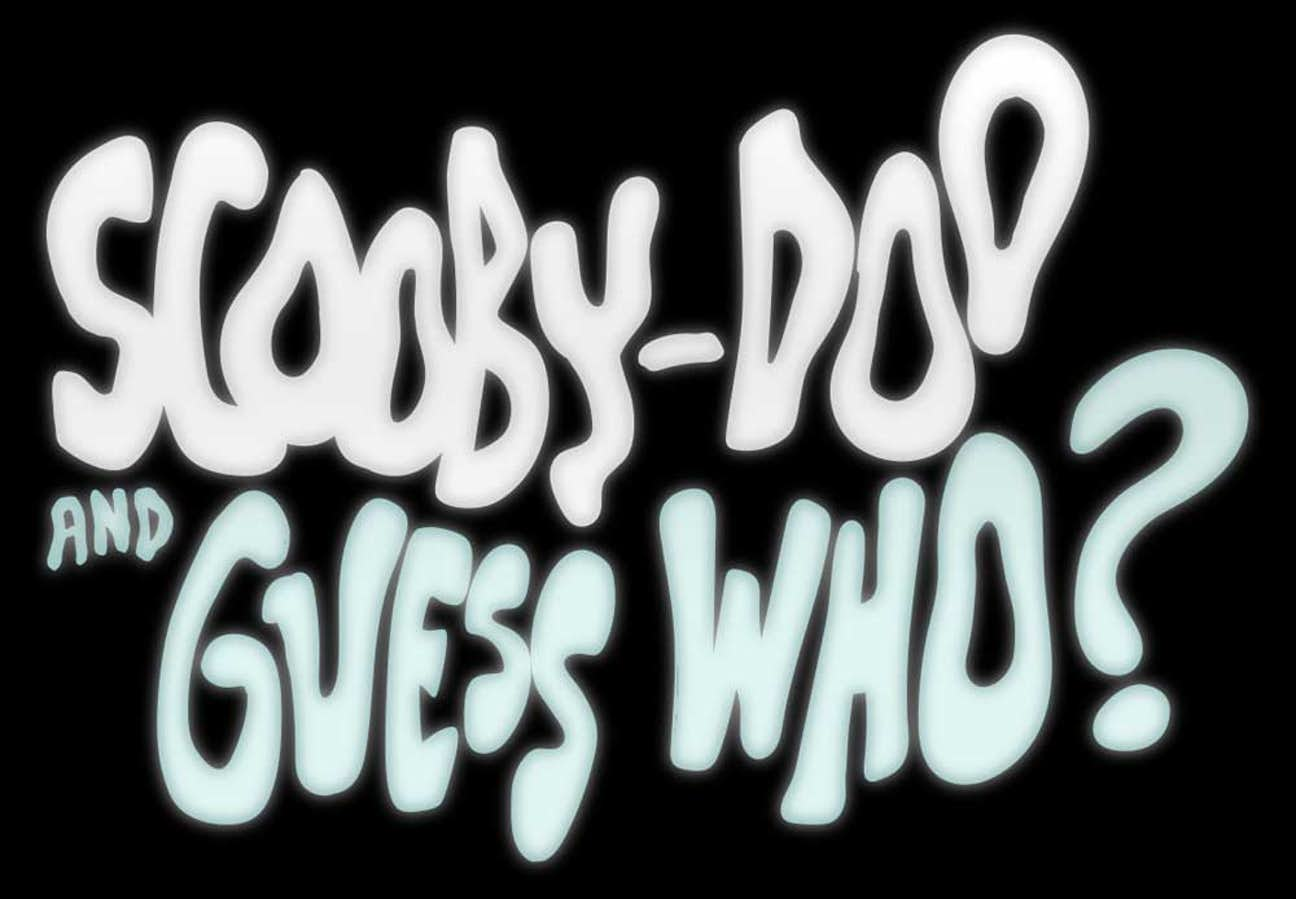
- Promotional franchise logo
- Genre: Comedy; Mystery
- Based on: Characters by Hanna-Barbera Productions
- Developed by: Chris Bailey
- Voices of: Frank Welker; Grey DeLisle; Matthew Lillard; Kate Micucci
- Opening theme: "Scooby-Doo and Guess Who?" performed by David Poe
- Composers: Steven Morrell; Adam Berry
- Country of origin: United States
- Original language: English
- No. of seasons: 2
- No. of episodes: 52

Production
- Executive producer: Sam Register
- Producer: Chris Bailey
- Running time: 22 minutes
- Production company: Warner Bros. Animation (Note: Animation outsourced to Yeson Entertainment and Digital eMation (season 1) and Snipple Animation (season 2))

Original release
- Network: Boomerang (2019–2021); Cartoon Network (2019); HBO Max (2021)
- Release: June 27, 2019 – October 1, 2021

Related
- Be Cool, Scooby-Doo! (2015–18); Velma (2023–24)

Scooby-Doo and Guess Who? is an American animated television series produced by Warner Bros. Animation and Chris Bailey and the thirteenth television series in the Scooby-Doo franchise.

The show first premiered on Boomerang's SVOD service on June 27, 2019, before its debut on Cartoon Network on July 8, 2019, and on the Boomerang channel on October 1, 2020. The series later moved to HBO Max, and the remaining episodes of the second season were released on October 1, 2021.

== Premise ==
Following a similar premise to The New Scooby-Doo Movies, the series focuses on Mystery Inc. as they solve mysteries while encountering and being assisted by various celebrities and fictional characters, including DC Comics and Hanna-Barbera characters.

== Development ==
After leaving the production of the independent animated film Paws of Fury: The Legend of Hank, due to its troubled production, he called Sam Register to tell him that he had become available to make a show. They often talked about doing a “Cartoony Superheroey Thing”, so Sam sent the message to Jay Bastian, Senior Vice President of Series for Warner Bros. Animation. After meeting with Jay, Chris was given a project that fit with what he wanted to make and began developing it, but before he could turn in the script, the project was canceled in the midst of AT&T's purchase of Time Warner. During one of Chris's later meetings with Jay, he asked him about Scooby-Doo, and Chris told him that he watched the franchise as a kid, tuning in to watch it "every Saturday morning for three years before ultimately moving on to other stuff". While Chris loved the franchise and its characters, he did not consider himself to be a "Scooby-Doo guy". However, one aspect of the franchise that stuck with him was the celebrity guest stars. He stated:

"Well, what if we did like sort of a contemporary version of Scooby-Doo totally went back to basics with the structure and just sort of milk the clichés of style, not something that was done because or it was done at the time because of budget, but overtime those things became style, so let's embrace those things and let's not do too much animation that's three-quarter into camera, let's like stage things for depth but keep the animation left to right and right to left and let's always use Scooby and Shaggy's classic run and use the same takes things like that."

Jay liked the idea and the original concept of the show, but instead of celebrity guest stars, it was originally going to feature guests from other Hanna-Barbera shows, with potential guests including Jonny Quest and Frankenstein Jr. and The Impossibles. In one conversation during development, Sam Register stated that he wanted to do a show with Steve Urkel, which was one of Chris's favorite shows. This marked a shift toward more human guest stars, with cartoon characters existing as a fallback option. The crew wanted to invite Michael Phelps to do an episode with Jabberjaw, but it was not produced due to him declining. As a comic book fan, Chris Bailey also chose to include several superheroes as a guest stars, including Wonder Woman, Batman, and The Flash.

== Voice cast ==
Main cast

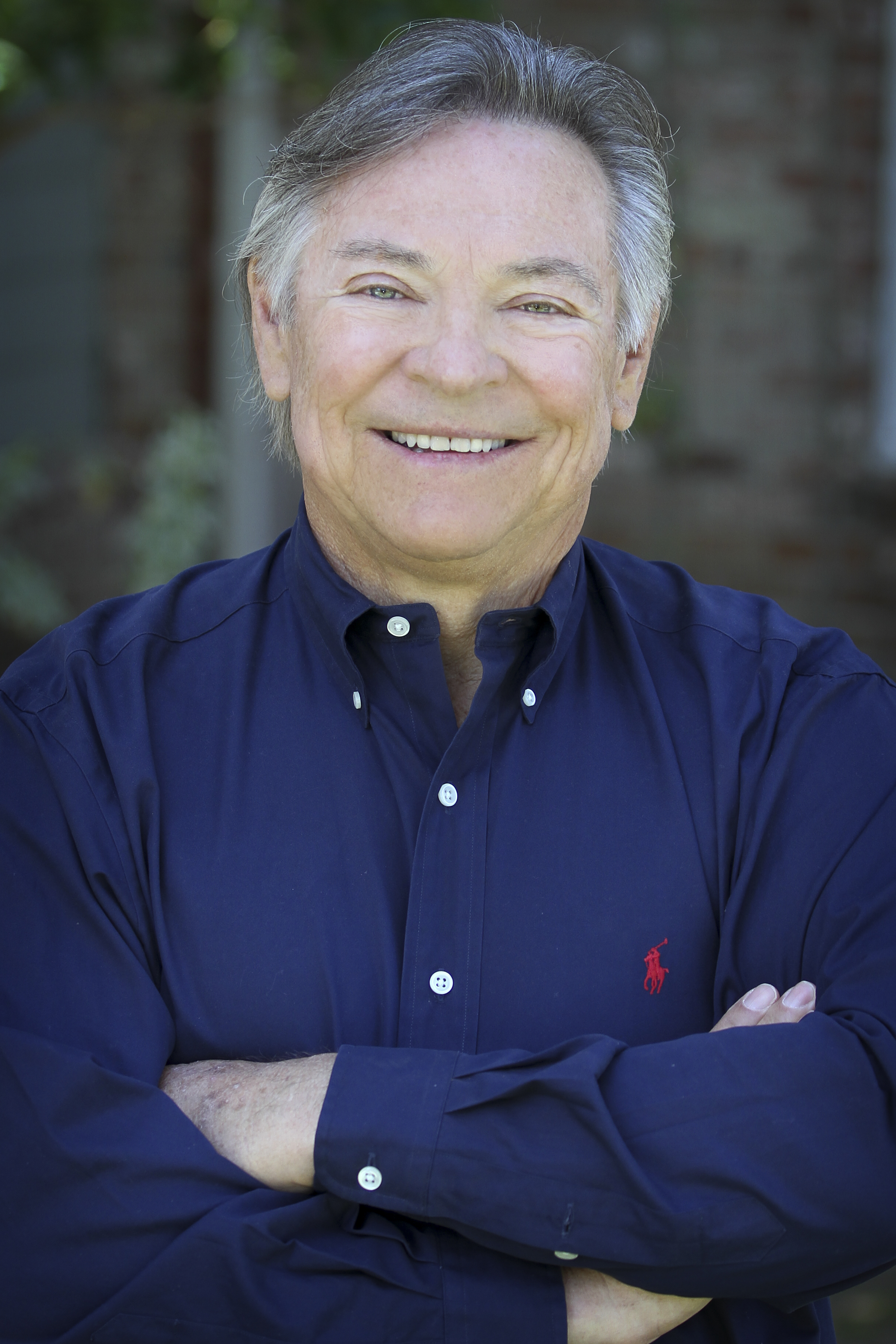
Frank Welker

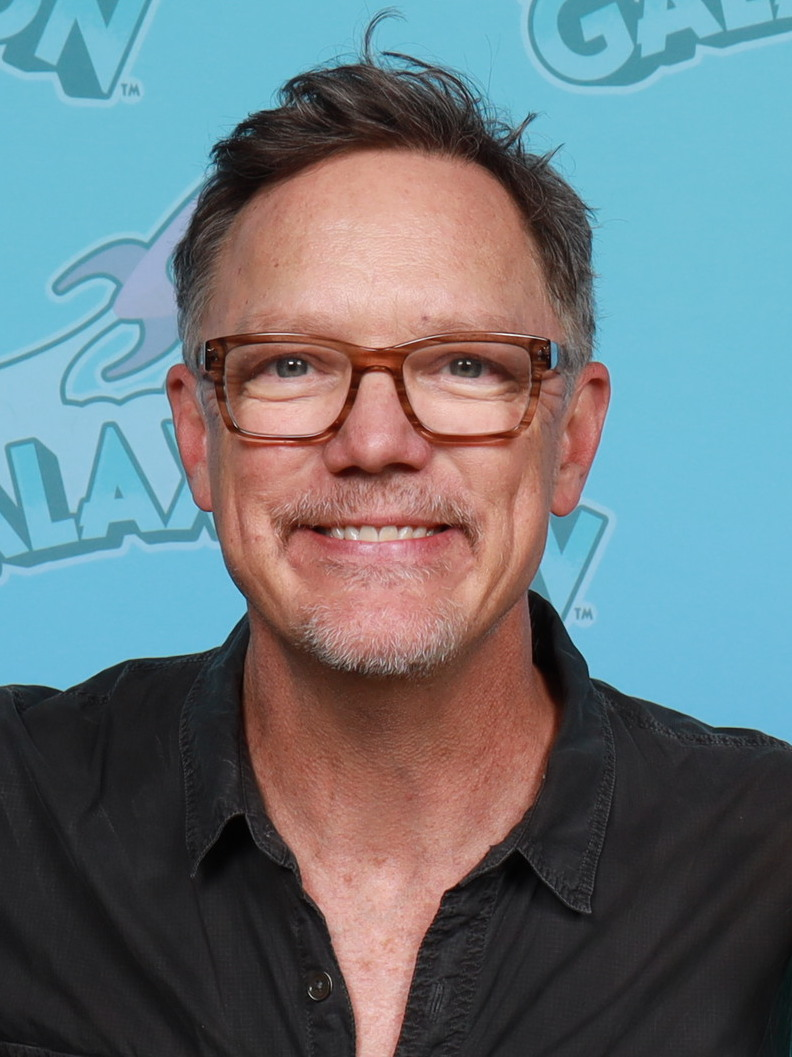
Matthew Lillard

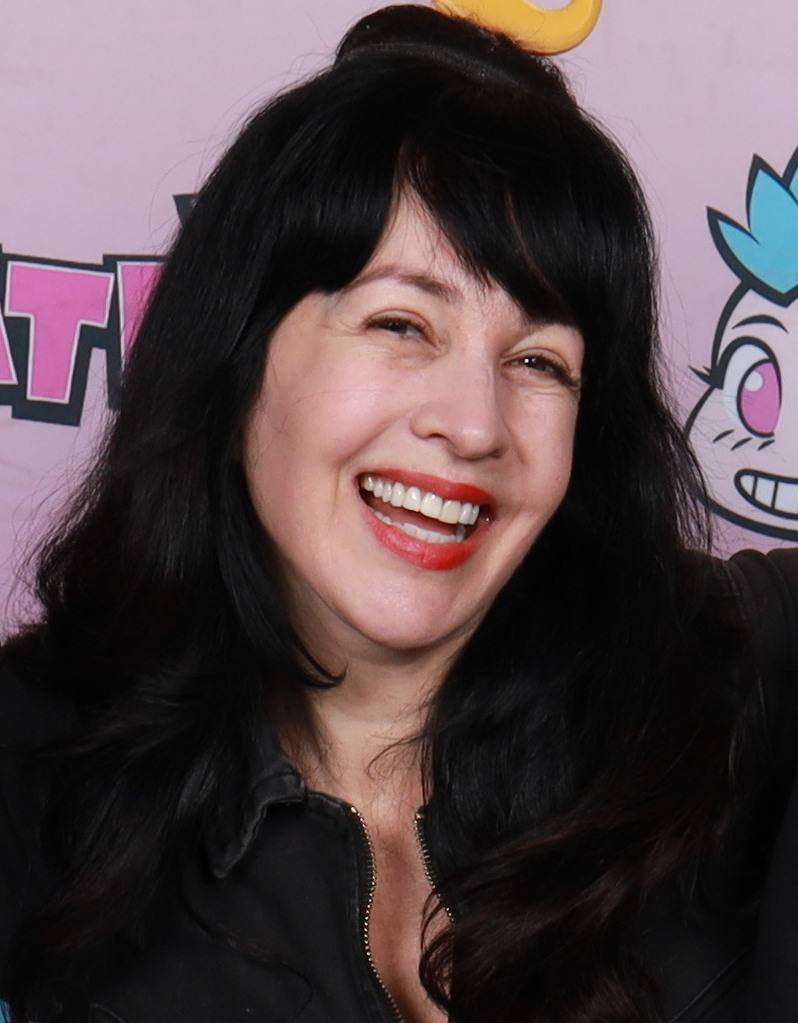
Grey DeLisle

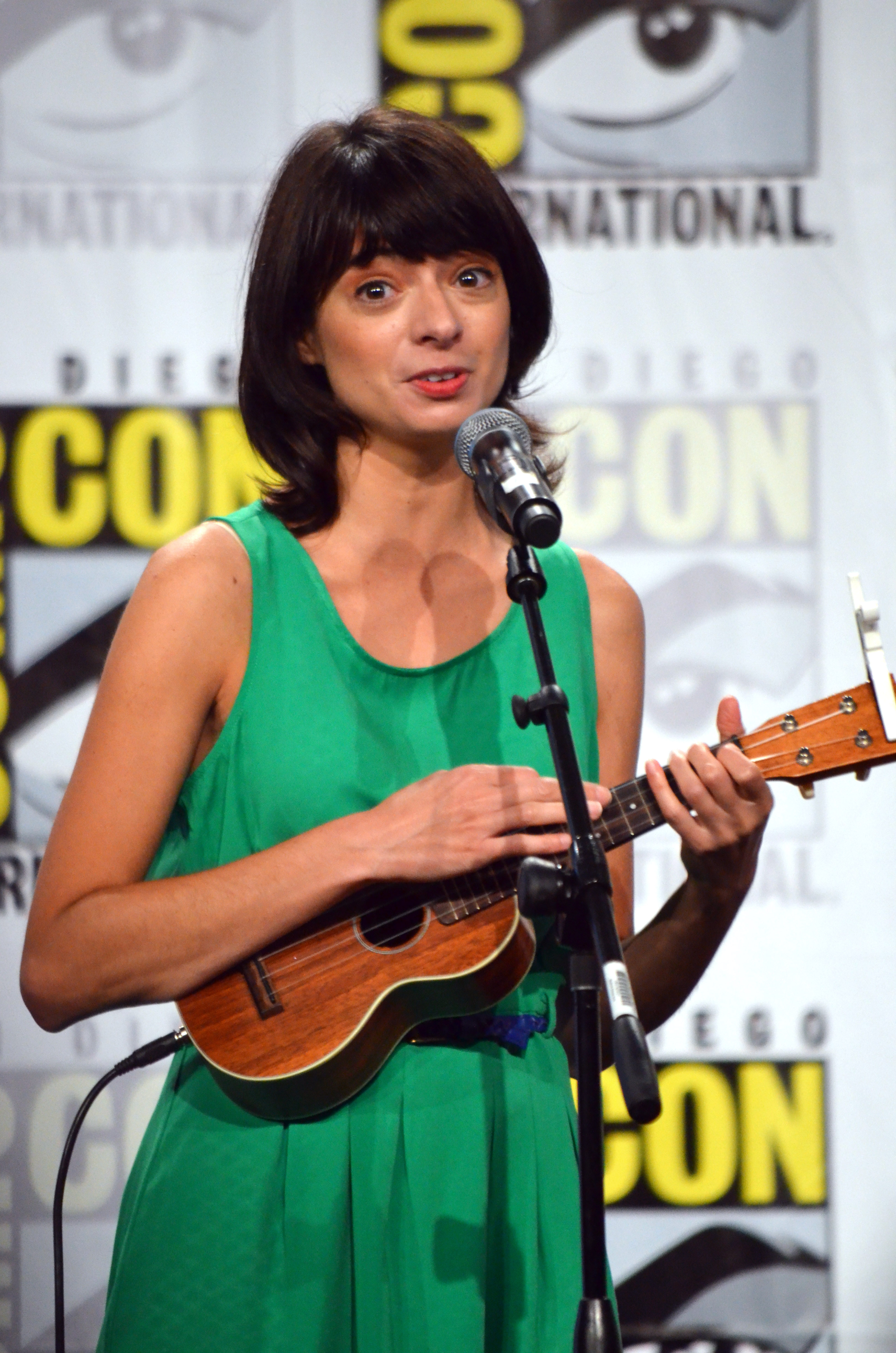
Kate Micucci

=== Main cast ===
- Frank Welker (Note: Frank Welker, Matthew Lillard, Grey Griffin, and Kate Micucci also voice themselves in "A Haunt of a Thousand Voices!") as Scooby-Doo, Fred Jones, Dynomutt, Speed Buggy, and Magilla Gorilla
- Grey DeLisle as Daphne Blake
- Matthew Lillard as Shaggy Rogers
- Kate Micucci as Velma Dinkley

=== Guest stars ===
- Laila Ali
- Sean Astin
- Jessica Biel
- Terry Bradshaw
- Kimberly Brooks (Note: Kimberly Brooks voices Luna of The Hex Girls.)
- Alton Brown
- Carol Burnett
- Steve Buscemi (Note: Steve Buscemi also voiced his cousin Paolo in "Fear of the Fire Beast!")
- Cher
- Joey Chestnut
- Kevin Conroy (Note: Kevin Conroy voices Batman in "What a Night, for a Dark Knight!")
- Ian James Corlett (Note: Ian James Corlett voices Sherlock Holmes in "Elementary, My Dear Shaggy!")
- Sandy Duncan
- Jeff Dunham
- Darci Lynne Farmer
- Jeff Foxworthy
- Morgan Freeman
- Jim Gaffigan
- Ricky Gervais
- Johnny Gilbert
- Whoopi Goldberg
- Tim Gunn
- Gigi Hadid
- Jennifer Hale (Note: Jennifer Hale voices Thorn of The Hex Girls.)
- Halsey
- Mark Hamill (Note: Mark Hamill also voices Joker in "What a Night, For a Dark Knight!" and Trickster in "One Minute Mysteries!")
- David Kaye (Note: David Kaye voices Blue Falcon in "Scooby-Doo, Dog Wonder!")
- Chloe Kim
- Rachel Kimsey (Note: Rachel Kimsey voices Wonder Woman in "The Scooby of a Thousand Faces!")
- Liza Koshy
- Tara Lipinski
- Lucy Liu
- Macklemore
- Malcolm McDowell
- Kacey Musgraves
- Bill Nye
- Chris Paul
- Penn & Teller
- Axl Rose
- Kristen Schaal
- Charlie Schlatter (Note: Charlie Schlatter voices The Flash in "One Minute Mysteries!")
- Sia
- Joseph Simmons
- Christian Slater
- Jason Sudeikis
- Wanda Sykes
- George Takei
- Kenan Thompson
- Alex Trebek
- Neil deGrasse Tyson
- Steven Weber (Note: Steven Weber voices Alfred Pennyworth in "What a Night, for a Dark Knight!")
- Jaleel White (Note: Jaleel White voices Steve Urkel.)
- Jane Wiedlin (Note: Jane Wiedlin voices Dusk of The Hex Girls.)
- Billy Dee Williams
- "Weird Al" Yankovic
- Maddie Ziegler

Fictional guest characters include The Hex Girls, Steve Urkel, Wonder Woman, Sherlock Holmes, Batman, Alfred Pennyworth, Joker, Flash, Trickster, Magilla Gorilla, the Ghost of Abraham Lincoln, Blue Falcon and Dynomutt and the characters from The Funky Phantom.

== Episodes ==
Season	Episodes		Originally released		
Season	Episodes		First released	Last released	Network
1	26	13	June 27, 2019	September 19, 2019	Boomerang
1	26	13	July 2, 2020		Boomerang
2	26	15	October 1, 2020	February 25, 2021	Boomerang
2	26	11	October 1, 2021		HBO Max

=== Season 1 (2019–20) ===
No. overall	No. in season	Title	Guest star(s)	Directed by	Written by	Original release date
Part 1
1	1	"Revenge of the Swamp Monster!"	Chris Paul	Jae Kim	Michael Ryan	June 27, 2019
After solving the mystery of the Bee Man of Alcatraz, Mystery Inc. is flown to Florida, where Shaggy is to be a caddy for Houston Rockets basketball player Chris Paul at a charity golf event. The event is to raise money for a struggling arts school that is on the verge of bankruptcy because of a swamp monster causing trouble for the tournament.
2	2	"A Mystery Solving Gang Divided"	Ghost of Abraham Lincoln	Frank Paur	Mark Hoffmeier	July 2, 2019
Mystery Inc. receives a call from Chambersburg, Pennsylvania, a battlefield near Gettysburg, Pennsylvania, to solve the mystery of ghost Civil War soldiers. There, they encounter The Funky Phantom crew. While trying to solve the mystery, the teams are at odds until the Ghost of Abraham Lincoln suggests that they work together.
3	3	"Peebles' Pet Shop of Terrible Terrors!"	Wanda Sykes	Mike Milo	Caroline Farah	July 11, 2019
An egg that was delivered to Peebles' Pet Supply Mega-Store hatches into a fish monster and captures Mr. Peebles. When Mystery Inc. arrives at the scene, they rescue Mr. Peebles' intern, Wanda Sykes, who is helping to save animals up for adoption at a pet supply store. Now, they and Wanda must save the store and Mr. Peebles as well as the animals.
4	4	"Elementary, My Dear Shaggy!"	Sherlock Holmes	Mike Milo	Michael Ryan	July 18, 2019
While on a tour of London, Mystery Inc. encounters screaming skulls of English legend and teams up with a man who claims to be Sherlock Holmes.
5	5	"Ollie Ollie In-Come Free!"	Ricky Gervais	Mike Milo	Mike Ryan	July 25, 2019
In London, Mystery Inc. visits Ricky Gervais when a mummified cat monster who appears to have a connection to the Egyptian goddess Bast appears, and attempt to prevent the statue of Bast from falling into the wrong hands.
6	6	"The Scooby of a Thousand Faces!"	Wonder Woman	Gavin Dell	Caroline Farah	August 1, 2019
While on vacation in Greece, Mystery Inc. is caught in a battle between a Minotaur and Wonder Woman. Although Scooby-Doo takes a liking to her, Shaggy and Fred feel left out after Daphne and Velma are chosen to help her take down her latest target.
7	7	"The Cursed Cabinet of Professor Madds Markson!"	Penn & Teller	Frank Paur	Michael Ryan	August 8, 2019
After Mystery Inc. accepts an invitation from reclusive millionaire Hugo Hauser to spend one night in the haunted Savannah Hotel in Las Vegas before its controlled demolition, they find that magicians Penn & Teller have also accepted the challenge as they contend with the Ghost of Madds Markson and his monster.
8	8	"When Urkel-Bots Go Bad!"	Steve Urkel	Mike Milo	Thomas Krajewski	August 15, 2019
After Steve Urkel (Jaleel White) asks Mystery Inc. for help tracking down his Urkel-Bot in Chicago, they uncover a deeper mystery with the appearance of the Technomancer, who has control over robots.
9	9	"The Fastest Food Fiend!"	Jim Gaffigan	Frank Paur	Caroline Farah	August 22, 2019
While competing in a fast food-eating/racing competition held by Doc Tally's fast food chain for its 70th anniversary, Scooby and Shaggy face off against comedian Jim Gaffigan while contending with the Spectral Speedster, who tries to disrupt the contest.
10	10	"Attack of the Weird Al-Osaurus!"	"Weird Al" Yankovic	Gavin Dell	Mark Hoffmeier	August 29, 2019
While driving through the Rocky Mountains, Mystery Inc. encounters "Weird Al" Yankovic, who warns them about a dinosaur that, along with another dinosaur, is causing destruction at his sleepaway camp.
11	11	"Now You Sia, Now You Don't!"	Sia	Mike Milo	Caroline Farah	September 5, 2019
In Palm Springs, Mystery Inc. receives a call from Sia, who tells them that she has gotten into trouble with the authorities due to a notorious jewel thief impersonating her and causing her to be blamed for the crimes.
12	12	"Quit Clowning!"	Kenan Thompson	Sean Bishop	Annalise LaBianco and Jeffery Spencer	September 12, 2019
In Atlanta, Shaggy and Scooby take Mystery Inc. to meet their friend Kenan Thompson, who is preparing to broadcast his own telethon. When the ghost clown Pazzo attacks, they must help Thompson save the telethon.
13	13	"What a Night, For a Dark Knight!"	Batman	Chris Bailey	Michael Ryan	September 19, 2019
After Man-Bat kidnaps Daphne's "uncle" Alfred Pennyworth, Batman teams up with Mystery Inc. to rescue him. Although he suspects that Kirk Langstrom has become Man-Bat again, learns that someone else is posing as Man-Bat, as he is still incarcerated at Arkham Asylum. Note(s): This marks Kevin Conroy's final televised performance as Batman prior to his death in November 2022, as well as Mark Hamill's final performance as the Joker before his retirement from the role in January 2023 following Conroy's death.
Part 2
14	14	"The Nightmare Ghost of Psychic U!"	Whoopi Goldberg	Frank Paur	Caroline Farah	July 2, 2020
While driving through snowy mountains, Mystery Inc. stops by a remote university, where they meet Whoopi Goldberg, who is a student there. They must stop the university from closing so Whoopi can graduate while dealing with the Nightmare Ghost.
15	15	"The Sword, The Fox, and the Scooby-Doo!"	Mark Hamill	Mike Milo	Thomas Krajewski	July 2, 2020
In Japan, Mystery Inc. helps Mark Hamill rescue his high school drama teacher Mr. Berle, who was kidnapped by a fox monster. While investigating the scene of the crime, they discover a secret basement beneath the floor and the mystery deepens when the monster's footprints lead to an ancient Japanese temple rumored to house an ancient sword.
16	16	"One Minute Mysteries!"	Flash	Sean Bishop	Michael Ryan	July 2, 2020
Barry Allen wants to hang out with Shaggy and Scooby at Big Belly Burger more often, but is unable to due to them having to leave to solve mysteries. He decides to aid Mystery Inc. as The Flash to help them solve mysteries, but this causes tensions between them as they are unable to solve mysteries themselves and there are no villains to stop, as they are incarcerated at Iron Heights Penitentiary. Flash agrees to slow down and go at "normal speed", but this puts others in danger as a plot by a sentient teddy bear unfolds to force Flash to reveal his secret identity to the world.
17	17	"Hollywood Knights!"	George Takei	Mike Milo	Michael Ryan	July 2, 2020
At the request of George Takei, who is serving as a tour guide, Mystery Inc. investigates a haunted estate that belonged to deceased Hollywood director Cecil D. Darrington and will soon be seized by the government to be auctioned off to the highest bidder. As they investigate, suits of armor are brought to life by the Ghost Knight of Duke Doom-Bringer, eventually drawing out the estate's rightful owner, the reclusive Darla Darrington.
18	18	"The New York Underground!"	Halsey	Frank Paur	Michael Ryan	July 2, 2020
Scooby surprises Shaggy by secretly entering him in a poetry slam against Halsey, with the winner receiving an antique brass key to New York City itself. However, the poetry slam is interrupted when a humanoid alligator monster attacks and steals the key. However, an impression of the key is made in Shaggy's burrito, allowing Mystery Inc. to make a replica with a symbol on the key. This leads them to the New York Underground (Subterranean New York City), a cafe where patrons pay for food with poetry which is run by the Keeper of Knowledge.
19	19	"Fear of the Fire Beast!"	Steve Buscemi	Frank Paur	Caroline Farah	July 2, 2020
In Sicily, Mystery Inc. is tracking a fire monster from Mount Etna that is apparently hunting Steve Buscemi, who is in the country visiting his cousins Nana and Paolo. However, everyone in Sicily thinks he is a gangster because of his roles in movies, with him unsuccessfully trying to explain that the roles he portrayed are not who he is as a person.
20	20	"Too Many Dummies!"	Jeff Dunham; Darci Lynne Farmer	Sean Bishop	Michael Ryan	July 2, 2020
Mystery Inc. is hired to bring the doll Crazy Karl to a ventriloquist competition by its organizer, Baz Bozzington. Jeff Dunham and Walter, along with Darci Lynne Farmer and Petunia, are attending as celebrity judges when Karl seemingly comes to life and attacks a security guard. Complicating matters is the fact that the owner of the motel they are staying in, along with her son, wants Petunia and Walter to be part of their doll collection.
21	21	"Dance Matron of Mayhem!"	Maddie Ziegler	Mike Milo	Caroline Farah	July 2, 2020
Maddie Ziegler wins a dance studio in a dance competition on the condition that it be reopened or else the city will confiscate it and demolish it to build a parking lot. However, the ghost of the studio's previous owner, who died thirty years ago, wreaks havoc on the studio, preventing it from reopening. Maddie invites Daphne to the studio during her latest attempt at re-opening it, but her only hope of appeasing the ghost is a dance move called "The Zorbrinski Triangle", a move so difficult that only she has ever performed it.
22	22	"The Wedding Witch of Wainsly Hall!"	Jeff Foxworthy	Frank Paur	Michael Ryan	July 2, 2020
Jeff Foxworthy is hired as a truck driver to transport the house Wainsly Hall to its new location before a six- lane interstate is built over it. However, it is haunted by the Wedding Witch, who according to legend is the ghost of Lenora Wainsly. After being left at the altar by famous chef Bayard B. Beauregard, her depression and self-loathing caused her to become the Witch and curse the property. Mystery Inc. and Jeff must get rid of the Wedding Witch so that Wainsly Hall can be relocated.
23	23	"A Run Cycle Through Time!"	Malcolm McDowell	Sean Bishop	Benjamin Townsend	July 2, 2020
At the request of Malcolm McDowell, Mystery Inc. travels to his estate near Santa Barbara, California to help solve the mystery of the Chronobeast and why it is pursuing him. While filming a Hollywood movie about time travel decades ago, he became interested in the theoretical physics behind time travel and was able to build a time machine after many years of research. He takes them to his secret underground laboratory, where he shows them the time machine. After being contacted by her future self, Velma, Mystery Inc. and McDowell are forced to flee through time after the Chronobeast attacks them.
24	24	"I Put a Hex on You!"	The Hex Girls	Frank Paur	Thomas Krajewski	July 2, 2020
Thorn of The Hex Girls receives a mysterious package from an anonymous fan containing Ester Moonkiller's cursed guitar and decides to use it in their concert later that night in Cincinnati. She has one of their roadies, Tiny, tune it in time for the show, but after playing the guitar, Tiny goes berserk and trashes Thorn's house and later the backstage area of the concert. With Daphne doing the Hex Girls' makeup, Mystery Inc. helps contain Tiny before being passed off by the Hex Girls as "Rock and Roll". The Ghost of Ester Moonkiller appears on stage to curse everyone at the concert, with Thorn and Luna's personalities becoming the opposite of normal after playing the guitar.
25	25	"The High School Wolfman's Musical Lament!"	Christian Slater	Mike Milo	Michael Ryan	July 2, 2020
Mystery Inc. is attacked by a werewolf that ambushes the Mystery Machine, causing it to crash into the nearby Hudson River. Christian Slater, who witnessed this, recognizes the logo on the van and hires them to track down the werewolf, which attacked his senior prom decades ago and now threatens to attack the makeup prom being held at his alma mater. As Mystery Inc. searches for the werewolf, they also contend with a mysterious woman.
26	26	"Space Station Scooby"	Neil deGrasse Tyson; Bill Nye	Sean Bishop	Annalisa LaBianco and Jeffery Spencer	July 2, 2020
Mystery Inc. is invited to help Bill Nye test his new experimental space voyager, but find that the crew of the space station has disappeared. They follow the sound of tapping to an electronically locked door, with Bill and Velma recognizing it as Morse code. Nye enters the code into the keypad, which opens the door and where they meet Neil deGrasse Tyson. Soon after, a giant tardigrade appears, threatening the mission and the space station.

=== Season 2 (2020–21) ===
No. overall	No. in season	Title	Guest star(s)	Directed by	Written by	Original release date
27	1	"The Phantom, The Talking Dog, and the Hot Hot Hot Sauce!"	Kacey Musgraves	Frank Paur	Thomas Krajewski	October 1, 2020
Daphne takes the gang to see her celebrity friend Kacey Musgraves at the Tallis Taggert Country Auditorium in Nashville, where she is performing. However, the Ghost of Tallis Taggert is attacking artists he does not like as part of his curse.
28	2	"The Last Inmate!"	Morgan Freeman	Sean Bishop	Michael Ryan	October 1, 2020
Mystery Inc. and Morgan Freeman investigate an old prison that has been abandoned for a hundred years because it is said to be haunted by the Ghost of Jean Lebeau.
29	3	"The Horrible Haunted Hospital of Dr. Phineas Phrag!"	Kristen Schaal	Sean Bishop	Caroline Farah	October 1, 2020
Mystery Inc. and monster hunter Kristen Schaal investigate a haunted hospital with the Ghost of Phineas Phrag, a doctor who in the 1950s drank a potion made from plant and insect DNA to cure his genetic disease.
30	4	"The Hot Dog Dog!"	Joey Chestnut	Mike Milo	Benjamin Townsend	October 1, 2020
While Shaggy and Scooby are at a hot dog eating contest with Joey Chestnut, a tree monster called the Gnarled One attacks them.
31	5	"A Moveable Mystery!"	Gigi Hadid	Sean Bishop	Caroline Farah	October 1, 2020
While in Paris during Fashion Week, Mystery Inc. helps model Gigi Hadid after a gargoyle attacks the event.
32	6	"The Feast of Dr. Frankenfooder!"	Alton Brown	Frank Paur	Ben Lapides	October 1, 2020
As Shaggy and Scooby visit a haunted castle in Germany because famous chef Alton Brown will be there, they also contend with a humanoid monster created from fruits and vegetables by Alton's mad food scientist ancestor Dr. Cornelius Frankenfooder.
33	7	"A Fashion Nightmare!"	Tim Gunn	Mike Milo	Rob Hoegee	October 1, 2020
Mystery Inc. encounters Tim Gunn while investigating sightings of the ghost of an elevator operator who is haunting the Dergfall Boldman Department Store.
34	8	"Scooby on Ice!"	Tara Lipinski	Sean Bishop	Laura Sreebny	October 1, 2020
Mystery Inc. travels to Austria for the International Ice Games where they meet figure skating champion Tara Lipinski. They also deal with a snow monster called the Snow Devil.
35	9	"Caveman on the Half Pipe!"	Chloe Kim	Frank Paur	Michael Ryan	October 1, 2020
A defrosted caveman attacks the slopes of the Rocky Mountains, where Mystery Inc. meets gold medalist snowboarder Chloe Kim as Mystery Inc. recalls having dealt with a caveman before (Note: As seen in the Scooby-Doo, Where Are You! episode "Scooby's Night with a Frozen Fright".).
36	10	"The Crown Jewel of Boxing!"	Laila Ali	Mike Milo	Caroline Farah	October 1, 2020
A robot sabotages the opening of a boxing museum created by boxing pro Laila Ali.
37	11	"The Internet on Haunted House Hill!"	Liza Koshy	Sean Bishop	Benjamin Townsend	October 1, 2020
At the haunted Thraber Estate, Shaggy and Scooby meet with their friend Liza Koshy. While taking part in her videos, they also deal with attacks caused by the Ghost of Charles M. Thraber.
38	12	"The 7th Inning Scare!"	Macklemore	Frank Paur	Ben Lapides	October 1, 2020
A mysterious invitation to a baseball game leads Mystery Inc. to meet rapper Macklemore who is being attacked by a ghostly yak mascot whose costume was originally associated with the Seattle Jaguars.
39	13	"The Dreaded Remake of Jekyll & Hyde!"	Sandy Duncan	Mike Milo	Caroline Farah	October 1, 2020
Sandy Duncan is shooting a new Jekyll and Hyde movie at Mammoth Studios when the set is attacked by a Hyde monster.
40	14	"Total Jeopardy!"	Alex Trebek	Frank Paur	Ben Lapides	November 13, 2020
Velma and Shaggy compete on Jeopardy! against the robot Max Kilobyte who goes on a rampage against anyone who could cause him to lose the game. Note: This was one of Alex Trebek's final roles before his death, with the episode airing five days after his death.
41	15	"Dark Diner of Route 66!"	Axl Rose	Mike Milo	Caroline Farah	February 25, 2021
After Fred, Daphne, and Velma are kidnapped by three Mud Men at a diner, Shaggy and Scooby team up with Axl Rose to save them.
42	16	"Lost Soles of Jungle River!"	Jason Sudeikis	Frank Paur	Michael Ryan	October 1, 2021
Jason Sudeikis leads Mystery Inc. on a treasure hunt through the Amazon rainforest, where they encounter a humanoid snake monster called El Hombre Serpiente.
43	17	"The Tao of Scoob!"	Lucy Liu	Mike Milo	Caroline Farah	October 1, 2021
A sculpture monster threatens to sabotage the opening of Lucy Liu's art show, so she enlists Mystery Inc. to help her stop it.
44	18	"Returning of the Key Ring!"	Sean Astin	Sean Bishop	Benjamin Townsend	October 1, 2021
Mystery Inc. investigates a hardware store after a dinner with Sean Astin leads them to help retrieve a lost key ring which a plant monster is also after.
45	19	"Cher, Scooby and the Sargasso Sea!"	Cher	Frank Paur	Caroline Farah	October 1, 2021
The gang celebrates Scooby's birthday on a yacht with Cher, but a pair of shark men attack the boat. They now have to solve the mystery as they have dealt with shark men before (Note: As seen in The New Scooby-Doo Movies episode "The Secret of Shark Island".).
46	20	"The Lost Mines of Kilimanjaro!"	Jessica Biel	Mike Milo	Caroline Farah	October 1, 2021
Mystery Inc. encounters a giant gorilla after meeting Jessica Biel in the jungles near Mount Kilimanjaro.
47	21	"The Legend of the Gold Microphone!"	Joseph Simmons (of Run-DMC)	Frank Paur	Michael Ryan	October 1, 2021
Joseph Simmons asks Mystery Inc. to help him renovate a youth center haunted by the ghosts of two famous musicians.
48	22	"Scooby-Doo and the Sky Town Cool School!"	Billy Dee Williams	Sean Bishop; Kexx Singleton	Michael Ryan	October 1, 2021
A pterodactyl monster attacks the "Cool School" where Billy Dee Williams is teaching Mystery Inc. how to be cool.
49	23	"Falling Star Man!"	Terry Bradshaw	Sean Bishop; Kexx Singleton	Michael Ryan	October 1, 2021
Mystery Inc. helps Terry Bradshaw solve the mystery of an alien on his farm.
50	24	"A Haunt of a Thousand Voices!"	Frank Welker, Grey DeLisle, Matthew Lillard and Kate Micucci	Frank Paur	Michael Ryan	October 1, 2021
Daphne introduces Mystery Inc. to her friend Frank Welker and his friends Grey DeLisle, Matthew Lillard, and Kate Micucci, who are filming a television show about four mystery-solving teens and a talking dog. When familiar monsters kidnap them, Mystery Inc. must devise a plan to save them.
51	25	"Scooby-Doo, Dog Wonder!"	Blue Falcon and Dynomutt	Mike Milo	Michael Ryan	October 1, 2021
After Blue Falcon is abducted and turned to stone by Medusa at an art museum, Scooby becomes Dog Wonder while Dynomutt takes Blue Falcon's place. Along with Mystery Inc., they must stop Medusa in order to rescue Blue Falcon.
52	26	"The Movieland Monsters!"	Carol Burnett	Kexx Singleton	Caroline Farah	October 1, 2021
Mystery Inc. tests out Carol Burnett's new virtual reality movie land which enables them to be put in different movies including Casablanca, The Searchers, A Night at the Opera, and The Wizard of Oz. However, a ghostly monster attempts to sabotage the simulations.

== Home media ==
The first season was released on DVD on January 19, 2021, by Warner Bros. Home Entertainment. The second season was released on DVD on June 28, 2022.
