= Fur (Jane Wiedlin album) =

Studio album by Jane Wiedlin
- Released: April 1988
- Recorded: 1987–1988
- Genre: Pop; pop rock; new wave
- Length: 37:40
- Label: EMI-Manhattan Records
- Producer: Stephen Hague

Jane Wiedlin chronology
| Jane Wiedlin (1985) | Fur (1988) | Tangled (1990) |

Fur is the second album by American singer Jane Wiedlin, released in 1988. The songs "Rush Hour" and "Inside a Dream" were released as singles and charted on the Billboard Hot 100. The album has a slick, contemporary production, with mainly programmed music complemented by electric guitar and horns.

The album was written over a span of two years, following the indifferent response to previous album Jane Wiedlin and her subsequent foray into acting.

Fur reached No. 105 on the US Billboard 200 and spent 21 weeks on the chart.

== Songs ==
Despite the title track addressing the fur trade ("I don't wear fur/Won't do it/Fur's for fools"), most of the songs deal with fidelity ("Homeboy"), blossoming love ("One Heart One Way", "Lover's Night") and the fulfilment of ambitions ("Inside a Dream").

"Song of the Factory" differs from these themes with insistent synth lines and a more abstract lyric ("It is cold/But it is warm/It is one/But not alone"). Wiedlin's favorite song from the album, it includes a remark about producer Shep Pettibone in morse code, in reference to a feud between the renowned remixer and Fur producer Stephen Hague.

Both sides of the original vinyl record closed with slower love songs: "The End of Love" (which was the B-side to "Rush Hour") and "Whatever It Takes". "Rush Hour" was the first single from the album and reached No. 9 on the US Billboard Hot 100 and No. 12 in the UK Singles Chart. The next single, "Inside a Dream", was a more modest success, reaching No. 57 in the US and No. 64 in the UK.

== Critical reception ==
Professional ratings
Review scores
| Source | Rating |
|---|---|
| AllMusic | 2.5/5 stars |
| Record Mirror | 2.5/5 stars |

Fur received mixed reviews upon release. In the Los Angeles Times, Steve Hochman wrote: "'Fur' is the perfect title for [Wiedlin's] second solo release: like a teddy bear it's warm and cuddly, but with no teeth or claws. Part of the blame goes to producer Stephen Hague, whose synth-pop is all fluff and no character". The album was described as "shimmering mainstream pop [...] that is sometimes reminiscent of Madonna" in the Daily News of Los Angeles.

The retrospective review on AllMusic says "'Rush Hour' and the haunting ballad 'The End of Love' are the best of the lot, with 'Song of the Factory' close behind, but many of the other tracks are filler, and a couple just don't work at all", concluding that "Fur largely sounds like Wiedlin was being led by EMI's A&R team instead of thinking for herself".

== Track listing ==
Side one
| No. | Title | Writer(s) | Length |
|---|---|---|---|
| 1. | "Inside a Dream" | Jane Wiedlin; Gardner Cole | 3:36 |
| 2. | "Rush Hour" | Wiedlin; Peter Rafelson | 4:03 |
| 3. | "One Heart One Way" | Wiedlin; Rafelson | 3:49 |
| 4. | "Homeboy" | Wiedlin; Stephen Broughton Lunt; Seth Swirsky | 3:58 |
| 5. | "The End of Love" | Wiedlin; Stephen Hague | 3:17 |

Side two
| No. | Title | Writer(s) | Length |
|---|---|---|---|
| 6. | "Lover's Night" | Wiedlin; Rafelson | 3:26 |
| 7. | "Fur" | Wiedlin; Cole | 3:12 |
| 8. | "Give!" | Wiedlin; Rafelson | 3:13 |
| 9. | "Song of the Factory" | Wiedlin; Bruce Woolley; Hague | 4:54 |
| 10. | "Whatever It Takes" | Wiedlin; Mary Kessler; Judy Simms | 3:55 |

== Personnel ==
- Stephen Hague – producer
- David Jacob – co-producer
- Simon Climie, Tessa Niles – backing vocals
- Neil Taylor – guitar
- The Kick Horns – horns
- Rob Fisher – keyboards
- Bruce Smith – percussion

== Charts ==
| Chart (1988) | Peak position |
|---|---|
| Canadian Albums Chart | 88 |
| UK Albums Chart | 48 |
| US Billboard 200 | 105 |
| Swedish Albums (Sverigetopplistan) | 48 |
