= Rush Hour (Jane Wiedlin song) =

1988 single by Jane Wiedlin

Single by Jane Wiedlin

from the album Fur
- B-side: "The End of Love"
- Released: April 1988
- Length: 4:03
- Label: EMI-Manhattan
- Songwriters: Jane Wiedlin, Peter Rafelson
- Producer: Stephen Hague

Jane Wiedlin singles chronology
"Blue Kiss" (1985)	"Rush Hour" (1988)	"Inside a Dream" (1988)

Audio sample
- Rush Hour: file; help

"Rush Hour" is a song by American musician Jane Wiedlin, released as the lead single from her second album, Fur (1988). It was backed by the album track "End of Love". The UK 12-inch single of "Rush Hour" includes an extended remix by Rusty Garner and an instrumental version.

"Rush Hour" is Wiedlin's most successful single, reaching number nine on the US Billboard Hot 100, number 12 on the UK Singles Chart, and number eight in Ireland. The music video for the single eschews the traffic metaphor of the song for a lighter concept: a simple "performance" clip interspersed with footage of Wiedlin swimming with dolphins.

== Track listings ==
7-inch, cassette, and mini-CD single

A. "Rush Hour" – 4:03
B. "The End of Love" – 3:17

Canadian and Australasian 12-inch single

A1. "Rush Hour" (extended remix) – 7:20
A2. "Rush Hour" (7-inch version) – 4:02
B1. "Rush Hour" (The Red mix) – 7:23
B2. "Rush Hour" (instrumental) – 5:03
B3. "The End of Love" – 3:17

UK 12-inch single

A1. "Rush Hour" (extended remix) – 7:20
A2. "Rush Hour" (7-inch version) – 4:02
B1. "Rush Hour" (instrumental) – 5:03
B2. "The End of Love" – 3:17

UK CD single

1. "Rush Hour" – 4:03
2. "The End of Love" – 3:14
3. "Rush Hour" (The Red mix) – 7:26

== Charts ==
Chart (1988)	Peak position
Canada Top Singles (RPM)	13
Canada Dance/Urban (RPM)	11
Denmark (Hitlisten)	17
Europe (Eurochart Hot 100)	44
European Airplay (European Hit Radio)	23
Ireland (IRMA)	8
Luxembourg (Radio Luxembourg)	10
New Zealand (Recorded Music NZ)	31
South Africa (Springbok Radio)	13
Sweden (Trackslistan)	20
UK Singles (Official Charts)	12
US Billboard Hot 100	9
US Cash Box Top 100 Singles	10
West Germany (GfK)	57

== Certifications ==
Region	Certification	Certified units/sales
United Kingdom (BPI) Sales since 2008	Silver	200,000^{‡}
^{‡} Sales+streaming figures based on certification alone.

== Release history ==
Region	Date	Format(s)	Label(s)	Ref.
United States	April 1988	7-inch vinyl; 12-inch vinyl; cassette	EMI-Manhattan	
Japan	June 25, 1988	Mini-CD	EMI-Manhattan	
United Kingdom	July 11, 1988	7-inch vinyl	EMI-Manhattan	
United Kingdom	August 30, 1988	7-inch picture disc; CD	EMI-Manhattan	

== Cover versions ==
- Northern Irish band Joyrider had a UK No. 22 hit with their version of the song in 1996.
