= Inside a Dream (song) =

Single by Jane Wiedlin

from the album Fur
- B-side: "Song of the Factory"
- Released: August 1988
- Genre: Pop, dream pop
- Label: EMI-Manhattan Records
- Songwriter(s): Jane Wiedlin, Gardner Cole
- Producer(s): Stephen Hague

Jane Wiedlin singles chronology
"Rush Hour" (1988)	"Inside a Dream" (1988)	"World on Fire" (1990)

"Inside a Dream" is a pop song by Go Go's guitarist Jane Wiedlin. It was the second single from her album Fur. Its predecessor "Rush Hour" fared better commercially. The track "Song of the Factory", also from Fur, was the B-side to "Inside a Dream", while remixed versions by Mark S. Berry augmented the 12" and CD formats. The music video for the song featured Wiedlin in dream-like scenic landscapes in the mountains and on a coast.

== Interpretation ==
Although the song has an upbeat major chord progression, the song's lyrics have a yearning, somewhat misanthropic theme. Wiedlin, in the chorus, sings how she wants to "live in a dream" in order to "find a world worth living for".

== Chart positions ==
Chart	Peak position
U.S. Billboard Hot 100	57
UK Singles Chart	64
US Cash Box Top 100 Singles	56
