= The Hex Girls =

Fictional eco-goth rock band

- The Hex Girls as they appear in Scooby-Doo and the Witch's Ghost; from left to right Dusk (Jane Wiedlin), Thorn (Jennifer Hale), and Luna (Kimberly Brooks).

Background information
- Origin: Warner Bros. Studios, Burbank, California, U.S.
- Genres: Eco-gothic rock; pop-punk
- Years active: 1999–present
- Labels: Kid Rhino; Warner
- Members: Jennifer Hale (Thorn); Jane Wiedlin (Dusk); Kimberly Brooks (Luna)
- Past members: Xander; Wendy Fraser; Angie Jarée; Windy Wagner; Terry Wood; Gigi Worth

The Hex Girls are a fictional gothic rock band created by writers Rick Copp and David A. Goodman for the Scooby-Doo media franchise. The band consists of Thorn, Dusk, and Luna, respectively portrayed by Jennifer Hale, Jane Wiedlin, and Kimberly Brooks. The Hex Girls were first introduced in Scooby-Doo! and the Witch's Ghost, and went on to appear in other Scooby-Doo media, including Scooby-Doo! and the Legend of the Vampire, What's New, Scooby-Doo?, Scooby-Doo! Mystery Incorporated and Scooby-Doo and Guess Who?.

The subsequent success of Scooby-Doo! and the Witch's Ghost has been attributed to the presence of the Hex Girls, who are now seen as queer culture and girl-power icons.

== Appearances ==
=== Films ===
In Scooby-Doo! and the Witch's Ghost, the Hex Girls are first introduced as potential suspects of the mystery that is going on in their hometown, Oakhaven, Massachusetts. After seeing them perform, the gang decides to follow them and see if they have anything to do with the mystery they are trying to unveil. Fred and Daphne even suspect that they are real witches, after seeing Thorn performing a strange ritual. Later, it is revealed that what they had in fact seen was a mere trick that Thorn had come up with to soothe their vocal cords, and they even explain that they are actually eco-goths, and Thorn is actually a Wiccan. They accompany the rest of the group in the search for Sarah Ravencroft's medical diary, ultimately revealed to be a manual of sorcery, and later on, Thorn is the one who is able to trap her and Ben back in the book, by using it to cast a spell on them due to her biological Wiccan heritage. To pay for the damage caused in the battle, the Hex Girls, along with Scooby and the gang perform for the town's folks. In the film they sing two songs called "Hex Girl" and "Earth, Wind, Fire and Air."

In Scooby-Doo and the Legend of the Vampire, Scooby and the gang find out that Thorn, Luna, and Dusk, now successful as the Hex Girls, are to open the Vampire Rock Music Festival in Australia. When they are about to start to sing their act, they are kidnapped by Yowie Yahoo's vampire minions, which leads the gang to look for them, while trying to solve the mystery regarding Vampire Rock. It is later revealed that rival band Wildwind had offered them a free scuba diving tour in the Great Barrier Reef, if they withdraw from the festival, which they refused to do. In retaliation, Wildwind refused to stop the kidnapping when they had a chance. The Hex Girls are eventually able to come back to the place where the festival is being held, just in time to see Mystery Inc. solve the mystery, also join Scooby and the gang in their own performance as "The Meddlin' Kids," alongside their new song "We Do Voodoo."

In Scoob!, during the arcade chase sequence, a Hex Girls concert poster can be seen immediately to the right of the arcade's entrance, with a Hex Girls pinball game additionally present among the various pinball machines on the right wall.

The Hex Girls were going to appear in Scooby-Doo and the Haunted High Rise. However, in February 2023, the film was canceled by Warner Bros. Discovery as a tax write-off.

=== Television series ===
In What's New, Scooby-Doo?, the Hex Girls appear in the episode "The Vampire Strikes Back". While the girls are in the Fortescu Castle in Transylvania, trying to shoot a video clip on their latest success, they are attacked by an apparent vampire. Connecting the attack with their previous experiences, Dusk tries to convince the others to leave the area for their own safety, while a disagreeing Thorn and Luna want to stay and try to shoot the videoclip. This creates an atmosphere of instability among the group, with Dusk considering leaving for a solo career. When Mystery Incorporated arrive at the same castle, the Hex Girls request their help to solve the mystery, while trying to prevent the girls from breaking up. In the end, Thorn, Dusk and Luna are able to wrap up the shooting, while enjoying the company of Scooby and the gang. In this episode, the normal ending theme is replaced with a Hex Girls rendition.

In Scooby-Doo! Mystery Incorporated, the Hex Girls appear in the episodes "In Fear of the Phantom" and "Dance of the Undead". In this continuity, the Hex Girls are already world-famous when they meet the gang, with Velma being one of their biggest fans.

In "In Fear of the Phantom", while singing "Hex Girl" during a concert in Crystal Cove, the group are attacked by an apparent ghost, and Thorn is almost crushed to death. After offering their assistance to the band, Daphne is captured while acting as a stand-in for Thorn singing "Earth, Wind, Fire, and Air". However, she is soon rediscovered, angry after overhearing that Fred wished he "didn't care about her". Afterward, she temporarily joins the band under the name "Crush". To help Daphne get over Fred, Thorn co-writes "Trap of Love" with her, after the performance of which the Phantom attempts to abduct Crush but instead takes a dummy of her, triggering Fred's trap. The Phantom turns out to be the Hex Girls' songwriter, Daniel Prezette, formally known as "Fantzee Pantz", who harbored jealousy of the Hex Girls' success and anger over having been replaced by them and delegated from his former star status – vowing revenge. With Prezette in jail and no more need for Daphne as a member, despite an open invitation from Thorn to remain, she unceremoniously retires from the band.

In "Dance of the Undead", after most of Crystal Cove, including Fred, Velma, and Daphne, is hypnotized by a zombie ska band called Rude Boy and the Ska-Tastics, Scooby and Shaggy track them down and ask the Hex Girls for help to defeat the other group in a battle of the bands, styled after the one from Scott Pilgrim vs. the World. They also help the gang find another clue of the Crystal Cove Mystery, by discovering and deciphering a hidden soundtrack in the Planispheric Disk.

In Scooby-Doo and Guess Who?, the Hex Girls appear in the episode "I Put a Hex on You!", where-in after Daphne's makeup vlog gains internet fame, she is invited to become the band's prime consultant, which also leads the gang to another mystery in the form of the haunted guitar of Esther Moonkiler that can seemingly control people's minds. Like in Mystery Incorporated, the Hex Girls are depicted as already being world-famous when they meet the gang; unlike previous incarnations, the band is depicted as having had a former fourth member, "Xander", who had been forced to leave the band due to an outbreak of hives, later running the band's fan club. The group is depicted as having embraced all that fame has had to offer them, with Thorn having a tranquillizer gun set aside for her specifically, while a rival group known as "The Jinx Gals" are also referenced, of whom the Hex Girls deride as a rip-off of their own act.

The band makes a cameo appearance in an image in the HBO Max series Velma. Thorn appears in season 2 as an adult who has a non-binary goth child named Amber.

=== Books ===
On August 26, 2025, "The Hex Girls: A Rogue Thorn (Scooby-Doo and Friends)" by Lily Meade was published by Penguin Random House. Confirmed in a post by ryleesbookshelf, the book takes place after Witch's Ghost, making them connected. In addition, the author confirmed during Lesbian Visibility Week 2025 that the main romance of the book is Velma and Thorn.

==== Potential spin-off television series ====
Upon the release of Scooby-Doo and the Witch's Ghost, Warner Bros. expressed interest in the development of a spin-off television series revolving around the characters, to be developed by the film's writers Rick Copp and David A. Goodman. Although it went unrealized, elements of this series were adopted into subsequent films featuring the characters, and in February 2019, Copp confirmed he had spoken further to Cartoon Network with regards developing the television series, with Hale, Wiedlin and Brooks all expressing interest in reprising their roles, with Brooks citing MeToo as "even more of a bolster for the argument that we should be trying to revive these characters".

=== Other appearances ===
In the final issue of Scooby-Doo! Team-Up, serving as the final installment of the Crisis of Infinite Scoobys arc (a title in reference to Crisis on Infinite Earths), being a crossover between the various incarnations of Mystery Incorporated from The 13 Ghosts of Scooby-Doo, A Pup Named Scooby-Doo, What's New, Scooby-Doo?, The theatrical live-action Scooby-Doo films, Shaggy & Scooby-Doo Get a Clue!, Scooby Doo! Mystery Incorporated, Be Cool, Scooby-Doo! and Scooby Apocalypse, the Hex Girls are revealed alongside Flim-Flam, Robi and Red Herring to have been controlling a gigantic puppet of Scooby-Doo's nephew Scrappy-Doo on the behest of Vincent Van Ghoul against the various incarnations of Mystery Incorporated, being upset that the Scooby Gang were allowed to have their characters evolve over time and continuities and gain more adventure and fame, and having been cast aside to be forgotten. After being questioned as to the absence of the real Scrappy-Doo from the plan, Thorn notes "that mutt [is] too annoying, even for us!", before a pack of various versions of Scrappy-Doo turn up to fight all incarnations.

The Hex Girls feature in the picture book released by Hachette Livre, Scooby-Doo: Velma and the Mystery of the River Ghost.

== Development ==
The Hex Girls co-creator Rick Copp has cited Josie and the Pussycats as a partial inspiration in creating the characters.

== Reception ==
Author Heather Greene felt "they reflect the 'girl power' movement and could be witch-derivatives of the Spice Girls..." Skatune Network performed a ska cover of one of their songs in 2019.

== Band members ==
=== Main members ===
- Jennifer Hale – Thorn (Sally McKnight), the lead vocalist and guitarist
- Jane Wiedlin – Dusk, the drummer and backup vocalist
- Kimberly Brooks – Luna, the keyboardist, bassist and backup vocalist

=== Guest member ===
- Grey DeLisle – featured artist as Daphne Blake aka "Crush"

=== Session performers ===
- Wendy Fraser – additional vocals
- Angie Jarée – additional vocals
- Windy Wagner – additional vocals
- Terry Wood – additional vocals
- Gigi Worth – additional vocals

== Discography ==
=== Soundtracks ===
List of soundtrack albums
Title	Album details
Scooby-Doo! and the Witch's Ghost	Released: September 14, 1999; Label: Kid Rhino; Format: CD

=== Other songs ===
Song	Writer(s)	Date	Notes
"Who Do Voodoo"	Jane Wiedlin	March 4, 2003	First featured in the film Scooby-Doo! and the Legend of the Vampire.
"What's New, Scooby-Doo?"	Rich J. Dickerson; Luigi Meroni	October 18, 2003	First featured in the What's New, Scooby-Doo? episode "The Vampire Strikes Back".
"Petrified Bride"	Rich J. Dickerson; Helene Arkin Jordana	October 18, 2003	First featured in the What's New, Scooby-Doo? episode "The Vampire Strikes Back".
"Trap of Love"	Tony Cervone; Andy Sturmer	August 23, 2010	First featured in the Scooby-Doo! Mystery Incorporated episode "In Fear of the Phantom".
"Good Bad Girls"	Dave Wakeling	March 26, 2013	First featured in the Scooby-Doo! Mystery Incorporated episode "Dance of the Undead".
"Love's Curse"	Dave Wakeling	July 2, 2020	First featured in the Scooby-Doo and Guess Who? episode "I Put A Hex On You!".

== Merchandise ==
After the release of Scooby-Doo! and the Witch's Ghost, the Hex Girls appeared in various types of merchandise created to cross market the film, including books like Scooby-Doo! and the Hex Files.

In 2020, Hex Girls merchandise began being made by the popular retail chain Hot Topic. In May 2021, they revealed an exclusive three-pack of Funko Pops, featuring Thorn, Dusk, and Luna. The Pops sold out in under 10 minutes. In October, Hot Topic revealed the new Hex Girls clothing line.

== See also ==
- Ember McLain – Another notable fictional goth musician from the television show Danny Phantom
- Gorillaz – An English rock band featuring fictional band members
