= Randell Kirsch =

American musician

- Genres: Rock; pop; surf rock; baroque pop
- Occupation: Musician
- Instruments: Vocals; guitar; bass
- Years active: 1965–present

Randell Kirsch is an American musician.

== Early life ==
Kirsch received his first guitar lesson in 1962, performed publicly for the first time in 1963 at the Fresno County Fair, won the Wolters Elementary School talent show in 1966 with his band The Scorchers with Jeff Bryon and Perry Hodge, formed The Pranks with Jeffrey Foskett and Bo Fox in 1979 and has since worked with Jan and Dean, The Beach Boys, Roger McGuinn, Michael Penn, Skunk Baxter, Jeff Larson, Jeff Foskett, Stephen Bishop, The Cowsills, Toad The Wet Sprocket, Papa Doo Run Run and other Southern California bands.

== Career ==
Randell's voice can be heard on recordings alongside Brian Wilson, Mike Love, Al Jardine, Stephen Bishop, Lou Rawls, John Stamos, LuAnn Olson, Jeff Larson, Jon Anderson of Yes, Glen Phillips of Toad The Wet Sprocket, Don Felder of the Eagles, Jan and Dean, The Indigo Girls, Andrew Gold, D.B. Cooper, Dwight Twilley, Bill Lloyd, The Cowsills, Russell Watson, Boy George, Steve Winwood, Barry Gibb, Cliff Richard, Dewey Bunnell and Gerry Beckley of America, Robin Gibb, Rick Wakeman of Yes, Kenney Jones, Gary Moore, Bill Wyman of The Rolling Stones, Hank Linderman, Celina Cherry, Mike Read and others.

Signed to a solo artist deal with IRS Records in 1987, Kirsch brought wife LuAnn Olson and Chris Hickey on board to make it a band deal resulting in the 1988 release "Show Of Hands" (not to be confused with the English folk duo still active today). Solo releases since then include "Poetry From The Burning Deck" (cassette only), "Near Life Experience" (POC International), Randell Kirsch & Papa Doo Run Run (Surrender Records), "Feather" (Surrender Records), "Lather, Rinse, Repeat" Volumes 1-6 (Surrender Records).

Songs penned by Kirsch can be heard in episodes of Full House, The Equalizer, Star Search, Dreams, Barrels of Fun and the films Welcome To Eighteen, Dickwad, Gunshy and Gidget's Summer Reunion. Artists who have covered Kirsch's songs include; Jane Wiedlin, Lou Rawls, John Stamos, LuAnn Olson, Pigs On Corn and others.

From 2004 to 2015 he served in a variety of vocal and instrumental roles in The Mike Love led Beach Boys touring band.

He currently writes, records and performs with LuAnn Olson and their band Among The Villains.

== Discography ==
- California Project - Papa Doo Run Run (1980). Credited Role: Vocals (Background)
- Dangerous Curves (1981) - D.B. Cooper. Credited Role:Vocals
- Girls (1984) - Dwight Twilley. Credited Role: Vocals (Background)
- Music of Espionage (1988) - Spies. Credited Role: Vocals (Background)
- Show Of Hands: I.R.S. (1988). Credited Role: Artist, Vocals, Guitar, Pedal Steel, Banjo, Gretsch Country Gentleman
- Deadicated: A Tribute to the Grateful Dead (1991). Credited Role: Percussion/Vocals/Bass (Acoustic)
- 20 More Explosive Fantastic Rockin' Mega Smash Hit Explosions! (1992). Credited Role: Producer
- Yellow Pills, Vol. 2: More of the Best of American Pop (1994) - Various Artists. Credited Role:Artist
- Jan & Dean's Golden Summer Days (1996) - Jan & Dean. Credited Role: Producer, Vocals (Background)
- Closet Pop Folk (1997) - Various Artists. Credited Role: Artist/Producer
- Postcards from the Other Side (1999) - Various Artists. Credited Role: Artist
- Unsound, Vol. 2: Guitars! (1999) - Various Artists. Credited Role: Artist
- Pop Under the Surface, Vol. 4 (2001) - Various Artists. Credited Role: Artist
- Anthology: Legendary Masked Surfer Unmasked (2002). Credited Role: Producer
- Fragile Sunrise (Bonus Tracks) (2002) - Jeff Larson. Credited Role: Harmony Vocals
- He's A Rebel: Gene Pitney Story Retold / Various (2002) - Various Artists. Credited Role: Artist, Producer
- Live In Las Vegas (2002) - Alan Jardine. Credited Role: Guitar (Bass)
- Back To Even (2004) - Bill Lloyd. Credited Role: Vocals (Background)
- Dance Of The Heart: His Best & More (2004) - Stephen Bishop. Credited Role: Vocals (Background)
- I Get Surround [DVD] (2004) - The Surf City Allstars. Credited Role: Vocals/Guitar (Baritone12 String)
- Stars In The Sand (2004) - Jeffrey Foskett. Credited Role: Vocals (Background)
- Grief Never Grows Old (2005) One World Project (single). Credited Role: Harmony Vocals
- Rarities (Ltd) (Rmst) (Dig) (2005) - Indigo Girls. Credited Role:Percussion/Vocals/Bass (Acoustic)
- Baked Goods - The Bel-Air Bandits. Credited Role: Artist
- The Bamboo Trading Company – From Kitty Hawk To Surf City
