= What's New, Scooby-Doo? =

American animated television series

- Genre: Mystery; Comedy; Adventure
- Based on: Characters by Hanna-Barbera Productions
- Developed by: Sander Schwartz
- Starring: Frank Welker; Casey Kasem; Mindy Cohn; Grey DeLisle
- Theme music composer: Rich Dickerson; Gigi Meroni
- Opening theme: "What's New, Scooby-Doo?" performed by Simple Plan
- Ending theme: "What's New, Scooby-Doo?" (instrumental)
- Composers: Rich Dickerson; Gigi Meroni
- Country of origin: United States
- Original language: English
- No. of seasons: 3
- No. of episodes: 42 (list of episodes)

Production
- Executive producers: Joseph Barbera; Sander Schwartz
- Producers: Chuck Sheetz; George Doty IV (S1, S3); Ed Scarlach (S2–3)
- Running time: 22 minutes
- Production company: Warner Bros. Animation (Note: Credited as Warner Bros. Television Animation from 2002 to 2003.)

Original release
- Network: Kids' WB
- Release: September 14, 2002 – July 21, 2006

Related
- A Pup Named Scooby-Doo (1988–91); Shaggy & Scooby-Doo Get a Clue! (2006–08)

What's New, Scooby-Doo? is an American animated television series produced by Warner Bros. Animation for Kids' WB. It is the ninth incarnation of the Scooby-Doo franchise that began with Scooby-Doo, Where Are You! and the first Scooby-Doo series in a decade (since A Pup Named Scooby-Doo ended in 1991). It is also the first Scooby Doo series to be produced by Warner Bros. Animation, and the first since both the foreclosure of Hanna-Barbera and William Hanna's death in 2001.

The show follows the format of Scooby-Doo, Where Are You!, in which Scooby-Doo, and his companions Fred, Daphne, Velma, and Shaggy, travel to varying locations solving mysteries; this format is modernized for What's New, Scooby-Doo?, in which the characters utilize technology that did not exist at the time Scooby-Doo, Where Are You! first aired. The series marked the return of Velma and Fred as main characters in the regular Scooby-Doo franchise since 1984's The New Scooby-Doo Mysteries. 1988's A Pup Named Scooby-Doo (which also featured Velma and Fred) was a prequel to the original 1969 series Scooby-Doo, Where Are You!.

It is the first television series in the franchise in which Frank Welker, Grey DeLisle, and Mindy Cohn respectively portrayed the voices of Scooby-Doo, Daphne, and Velma. Welker also returns as Fred in the series. Casey Kasem returned to voice Shaggy on the show after five years of not voicing him. This was the final Scooby-Doo series where Kasem voices Shaggy before the actor's death in 2014, though he still voiced other roles in the two following series, Shaggy & Scooby-Doo Get a Clue! and Scooby-Doo! Mystery Incorporated. This is also the first Scooby-Doo series where Scooby is not voiced by his original voice actor Don Messick who died in 1997.

The series premiered on September 14, 2002, and ran for three seasons before ending on July 21, 2006. The title song was performed by Canadian band Simple Plan. Reruns of the series have aired on both Cartoon Network from 2003–2016 and Boomerang from 2006–2020 and since 2023 in the United States. It also aired on Teletoon in Canada, and CBBC in the UK, then CITV.

In 2019, the show was made available to stream on Netflix in the US. In 2021, the rights were turned over to HBO Max, and in 2025, the show was made available for streaming on Tubi.

== Episodes ==
Season	Episodes	Originally released	
Season	Episodes	First released	Last released
1	14	September 14, 2002	March 22, 2003
2	14	September 13, 2003	March 27, 2004
3	14	January 29, 2005	July 21, 2006

== Characters ==
=== Main ===
- Scooby Doo: A Great Dane who's friends with Shaggy. Two things that they have in common are that they love food or are always afraid of ghosts. Voiced by Frank Welker.
- Shaggy Rogers: A beatnik slacker who's friends with Scooby. He and Scooby are usually scared and hungry; a running gag in the show. He is also known to have a high metabolism, and also is rich. At his voice actor's request, Shaggy was made into a vegetarian for this series. Voiced by Casey Kasem.
- Fred Jones: The leader of the Mystery, Inc. gang who is the master of making traps to catch the villains. However, sometimes the traps fail to work; Shaggy and Scooby mess them up then use the parts to catch the villain in their own fashion. Voiced by Frank Welker.
- Daphne Blake: The fashionable, resourceful woman of the gang who defends herself with her great fighting skills, although she can still fill the role of damsel in distress, often being captured by the villains. She is also quite ditzy and accident prone. Voiced by Grey DeLisle.
- Velma Dinkley: The smartest of the gang, and wears glasses because she is myopic. She has to fight back the advances of semi-recurring Gibby Norton, who does devious things, thinking it will win her over. Voiced by Mindy Cohn.

=== Recurring ===
Characters in the series who appear more than once:

- Elliot Blender: A competitive spoiled child who often loses to Velma in contests. Voiced by Kimberly Brooks.
- Melbourne O'Reilly: An Australian adventurer/explorer who is one of Fred's heroes. He is also based on Steve Irwin and Indiana Jones. Voiced by Steve Blum.
- J.J. Hakimoto: A famous, over enthusiastic, Asian director. Voiced by Brian Tochi.
- Gibby Norton: A nerd who has a crush on Velma, who hates the sight of him. He often turns out to be the villain to impress Velma, never succeeding. Gibby is modelled after his voice actor, Eddie Deezen.
- Burr Batson: A cocky southern professional racer who drives a monster truck. Voiced by James Arnold Taylor.
- Professor Laslow Ostwald: An inventor whom the gang meets. He first appears in "High-Tech House of Horrors" where his "House of the Future's" AI "Shari" goes haywire, attacking the tourists. Though the gang suspects him, it is later revealed that "Shari" itself is responsible (as she was angry at the Professor due to him getting all of the attention). The gang defeated "Shari" by ignoring her (as attention was what she wanted) causing her to overload. Professor Ostwald also appears in "E-Scream" at a "Video Game Convention" where his new invention the cuddly "Osomons" turn evil. It is later discovered that the whole mystery was actually a VR simulation Velma was trying out. Voiced by Dave Foley in "High-Tech House of Horrors" and James Arnold Taylor in "E-Scream".
- The Hex Girls: Thorn, Dusk, and Luna are the members of the famous eco-goth rock band The Hex Girls, with whom Scooby and the gang are acquainted with ever since their first meeting in Scooby-Doo! and the Witch's Ghost. Thorn is voiced by Jennifer Hale, Dusk is voiced by Jane Wiedlin, and Luna is voiced by Kimberly Brooks.
- Mr. B: The owner of the Secret Six puppies. His full name is never revealed. He also appears to be based on actor John Turturro given his accent and appearance. Voiced by Jeff Bennett.
- Crissie: A Golden Retriever who is the Secret Six's mother. She appears in "Homeward Hound" and "Farmed and Dangerous.” Unlike the Secret Six she does not appear in “Gold Paw”.
- The Secret Six puppies: Maize, Flax, Jingle, Knox, 14-Karat, and Bling-Bling. They are six very well-trained, prize-winning Golden Retriever puppies who have a knack for getting into trouble, and they like Scooby as a father figure. Maize and Knox are voiced by Jennifer Hale, Jingle is voiced by Colleen O'Shaughnessey, Flax is voiced by Dee Bradley Baker, Bling-Bling is voiced by Grey DeLisle, and 14-Karat is voiced by Frank Welker.
- Nancy Chang: The reporter in episodes "There's No Creature Like Snow Creature" and "Riva Ras Regas". Voiced by Lauren Tom.

== Production ==
In January 2002, it was announced Kids' WB had given a 13 episode order to a new Scooby-Doo series under the working title of All New Scooby-Doo! The Animated Series. The series was jointly picked up by both Kids' WB and Cartoon Network as the two networks had begun jointly selling advertising slots with the series arranged to run on Kids' WB first and then Cartoon Network.

For this incarnation of the franchise, Frank Welker, the voice of Fred, took over as the voice of Scooby (replacing both Don Messick, the original voice of Scooby who died in 1997, and Scott Innes, the second voice of the character in the made-for-video films released between 1998 and 2001). Casey Kasem returned as Shaggy, making his comeback as the character in 2002 after the production team decided to make Shaggy a vegetarian. This would also be the final series Kasem voiced the character, continuing to voice Shaggy in the direct-to-video Scooby-Doo films until retiring from the role in 2009; Grey DeLisle returned as the role of Daphne (having previously voiced the character in Scooby-Doo and the Cyber Chase and Night of the Living Doo). Actress Mindy Cohn took over for B. J. Ward as the role of Velma.

The series itself is a modernized version of the original Where Are You! series. It takes place in the 21st century and is more "realistic" than the previous, more cartoony incarnations, and features music from contemporary genres and all-new, original sound effects to replace the classic Hanna-Barbera sound effects. Even a distinctive thunderclap sound that was used frequently on older Scooby-Doo TV series was rarely used on the series. A laugh track was only used for the Halloween special. The classic formula was also frequently parodied throughout (in a manner similar to A Pup Named Scooby-Doo), including the line "And I would've gotten away with it too, if it weren't for you meddling kids." As such, it returns to the formulaic version of humans in monster disguises, rather than the real monsters and ghosts of the prior four direct-to-video films (or the 1980s versions that preceded them).

The show was produced by Warner Bros. Animation, the successor to Warner Bros. Cartoons which was the studio famous for bringing the Looney Tunes/Merrie Melodies to life, which had by this time absorbed Hanna-Barbera Productions in 2001, after being bought by Time Warner from Turner Broadcasting System since their merger on October 10, 1996. As is the standard for other classic Hanna-Barbera properties (Yogi Bear, The Flintstones, Wacky Races, etc.), the studio is still credited as the copyright owner, and Joseph Barbera, co-founder and co-chairman of the Hanna-Barbera studios, served as an executive producer alongside Sander Schwartz. William Hanna, longtime partner of Barbera, had died the year before. Wang Film Productions, DongWoo Animation Co. Ltd, and Lotto Animation contributed some of the animation for this series.

It is the first Scooby-Doo series to be produced in 16:9 widescreen, although it was cropped in 4:3 when broadcast.

The band Simple Plan is strongly connected to What's New, Scooby-Doo?. They perform the theme song (written by Rich Dickerson), and appeared as themselves in the episode "Simple Plan and the Invisible Madman". Two of their songs appeared in chase scenes: "I'd Do Anything" in the episode "It's Mean, It's Green, It's the Mystery Machine" and "You Don't Mean Anything" in "Simple Plan and the Invisible Madman", which also had the song "The Worst Day Ever" serve as the song the band plays during a scene where they practice, and a scene where they are in concert. Also, they contributed to the theatrical movie Scooby-Doo 2: Monsters Unleashed.

Each season included one holiday-themed special along with the other 13 regular episodes. The first season's special was A Scooby-Doo Christmas (2002), followed by A Scooby-Doo Halloween (2003) and A Scooby-Doo Valentine (2005).

What's New aired for three seasons on The WB Television Network's "Kids' WB" programming block as a half-hour program, before being put on an indefinite hiatus in 2005, although the last episode, "E-Scream", was aired on Cartoon Network. Reruns have been shown on both Cartoon Network and its sister channel Boomerang. It also debuted on Boomerang and Cartoon Network in the United Kingdom and Ireland. In the United Kingdom, it aired on CBBC from September 2003 until November 2015, and aired on CITV in 2016. Since July 9, 2021, What's New, Scooby-Doo? has aired as reruns on Cartoon Network UK.

== Reception ==
Common Sense Media gave the series a three out of five stars, writing, "Parents need to know that while there aren't many life lessons to be learned from an episode of this show, kids will enjoy the antics of the Scooby gang as they stumble upon and solve mysteries. Only very young children might find the show's puzzles and monsters frightening."

== Home media ==
Warner Home Video has released the entire series on DVD in Region 1. The series was initially released in ten volumes of four or five episodes between 2003 and 2006, as well as in the United Kingdom from 2004 to 2006 and later re-released, in the United States, in season sets in 2007–2008. In the UK, the volumes were released in a two disc set on May 30, 2011. A box set was released on October 29, 2007 in the UK containing all ten volumes in a complete disc set.

What's New, Scooby-Doo? U.S. season releases
Season		Episodes	Release	
1	2002–03	14	February 20, 2007	Includes "A Scooby-Doo Valentine" from Season 3 instead of "A Scooby-Doo Christmas" from Season 1
2	2003–04	14	June 5, 2007	"A Scooby-Doo Halloween" is included as a bonus episode
3	2004–06	14	January 8, 2008	Includes "A Scooby-Doo Christmas" from Season 1 instead of "A Scooby-Doo Valentine" from Season 3

What's New, Scooby-Doo? volume releases
Season		Episodes	Release dates	
Season		Episodes	United States	United Kingdom
1	2002–03	14	Volume 1: Space Ape at the Cape: August 19, 2003; Episode(s): "There's No Creature Like Snow Creature" – "Big Scare in the Big Easy" Volume 2: Safari So Goodi!: March 9, 2004; Episode(s): "It's Mean, It's Green, It's the Mystery Machine" – "Safari, So Goodi!" Volume 3: Halloween Boos and Clues: August 10, 2004; Episode(s): "She Sees a Sea Monster by the Sea Shore" Volume 4: Merry Scary Holiday: October 5, 2004; Episode(s): "A Scooby-Doo Christmas" • "Toy Scary Boo" Volume 5: Sports Spooktacular: June 14, 2005; Episode(s): "The Unnatural" Volume 7: Ghosts on the Go: November 8, 2005; Episode(s): "Pompeii and Circumstance" Volume 8: Zoinks! Camera! Action!: February 21, 2006; Episode(s): "Lights! Camera! Mayhem" 4 Kid Favorites: What's New, Scooby-Doo?: June 6, 2017; Episode(s): "Lights! Camera! Mayhem"	Volume 1: Space Ape at the Cape: May 3, 2004; Episode(s): "There's No Creature Like Snow Creature" – "Big Scare in the Big Easy" Volume 2: Safari So Goodi!: June 28, 2004; Episode(s): "It's Mean, It's Green, It's the Mystery Machine" – "Safari, So Goodi!" Volume 3: Lights! Camera! Mayhem!: June 20, 2005; Episode(s): "She Sees Sea Monsters by the Sea Shore" • "Toy Scary Boo" – "Pompeii and Circumstance" Volume 4: Mummy Scares Best!: July 18, 2005; Episode(s): "The Unnatural" Volume 10: Gentlemen, Start Your Monsters: November 20, 2006; Episode(s): "A Scooby-Doo Christmas" A Scary Space and a Swinging Face: October 29, 2007; Episode(s): "There's No Creature Like Snow Creature" – "Safari, So Goodi!" Movie Monsters and a Magic Mummy: May 30, 2011; Episode(s): "She Sees Sea Monsters by the Sea Shore" • "Toy Scary Boo" – "The Unnatural" Spooky Case and a Mad Race: May 30, 2011; Episode(s): "A Scooby-Doo Christmas"
2	2003–04	14	Volume 3: Halloween Boos and Clues: August 10, 2004; Episode(s): "Mummy Scares Best" • "High-tech House of the Future" • "The Vampire Strikes Back" Volume 4: Merry Scary Holiday: October 5, 2004; Episode(s): "Homeward Hound" • "Recipe for Disaster" Volume 5: Sports Spooktacular: June 14, 2005; Episode(s): "The Fast and the Wormious" Volume 6: Monster Matinee: August 9, 2005; Episode(s): "Big Appetite in Little Tokyo" • "A Scooby-Doo Halloween" • "The San Franpsycho" • "New Mexico, Old Monster" Volume 7: Ghosts on the Go: November 8, 2005; Episode(s): "Large Dragon at Large" • "It's All Greek to Scooby" Volume 8: Zoinks! Camera! Action!: February 21, 2006; Episode(s): "Simple Plan and the Invisible Madman" Volume 10: Monstrous Tails: December 5, 2006; Episode(s): "Uncle Scooby and Antarctica!" 4 Kid Favorites: What's New, Scooby-Doo?: June 6, 2017; Episode(s): "Big Appetite in Little Tokyo" • "A Scooby-Doo Halloween" • "The San Franpsycho" • "Simple Plan and the Invisible Madman" • "Uncle Scooby and Antarctica!" • "New Mexico, Old Monster"	Volume 4: Mummy Scares Best!: July 18, 2005; Episode(s): "Big Appetite in Little Tokyo" – "The Fast and the Wormious" Volume 5: Homeward Hound: October 24, 2005; Episode(s): "High-Tech House of Horrors" • "The Vampire Strikes Back" • "Homeward Hound" – "Simple Plan and the Invisible Madman" Volume 6: Recipe for Disaster: November 21, 2005; Episode(s): "Recipe for Disaster" – "It's All Greek to Scooby" Volume 10: Gentlemen, Start Your Monsters: November 20, 2006; Episode(s): "A Scooby-Doo Halloween" Movie Monsters and a Magic Mummy: May 30, 2011; Episode(s): "Big Appetite in Little Tokyo" – "The Fast and the Wormious" Top Dog and a Hot Dog: May 30, 2011; Episode(s): "High-Tech House of Horrors" • "The Vampire Strikes Back" • "Homeward Hound" – "It's All Greek to Scooby" Spooky Case and a Mad Race: May 30, 2011; Episode(s): "A Scooby-Doo Halloween"
3	2005–06	14	Volume 5: Sports Spooktacular: June 14, 2005; Episode(s): "Wrestle Maniacs" • "Diamonds Are Ghoul's Best Friend" Volume 7: Ghosts on the Go: November 8, 2005; Episode(s): "Ready to Scare" Volume 8: Zoinks! Camera! Action!: February 21, 2006; Episode(s): "A Scooby-Doo Valentine" • "E-Scream" Volume 9: Route Scary Six: June 6, 2006; Episode(s): "Fright House of a Lighthouse" • "Go West Young Scoob" • "Farmed and Dangerous" • "Camp Comeoniwannascareya" • "Gentlemen Start Your Monsters" Volume 10: Monstrous Tails: December 5, 2006; Episode(s): "A Terrifying Round with a Menacing Metallic Clown" • "Block-Long Hong Kong Terror" • "Gold Paw" • "Reef Grief" 4 Kid Favorites: What's New, Scooby-Doo?: June 6, 2017; Episode(s): "Fright House of a Lighthouse" – "A Scooby-Doo Valentine" • "Farmed and Dangerous" • "A Terrifying Round with a Menacing Metallic Clown" – "E-Scream"	Volume 7: Ready to Scare: April 10, 2006; Episode(s): "A Scooby-Doo Valentine" – "Ready to Scare" • "Diamonds Are a Ghoul's Best Friend" Volume 8: E-Scream: May 29, 2006; Episode(s): "Block-Long Hong Kong Horror" • "Gold Paw" – "E-Scream" Volume 9: Fright House of a Lighthouse: July 24, 2006; Episode(s): "Fright House of a Lighthouse" • "Go West, Young Scoob" • "Farmed and Dangerous" • "Camp Comeoniwannascareya" Volume 10: Gentlemen, Start Your Monsters: November 20, 2006; Episode(s): "A Terrifying Round with a Menacing Metallic Clown" • "Gentleman, Start Your Monsters" Ghouls, Fools and Food and a Grief on a Reef: May 30, 2011; Episode(s): "A Scooby-Doo Valentine" – "Ready to Scare" • "Diamonds Are a Ghoul's Best Friend" • "Block-Long Hong Kong Horror" • "Gold Paw" – "E-Scream" Spooky Case and a Mad Race: May 30, 2011; Episode(s): "Fright House of a Lighthouse" • "Go West, Young Scoob" • "Farmed and Dangerous" • "A Terrifying Round with a Menacing Metallic Clown" • "Camp Comeoniwannascareya" • "Gentleman, Start Your Monsters"
