= Jane Wiedlin =

American musician and actress (born 1958)

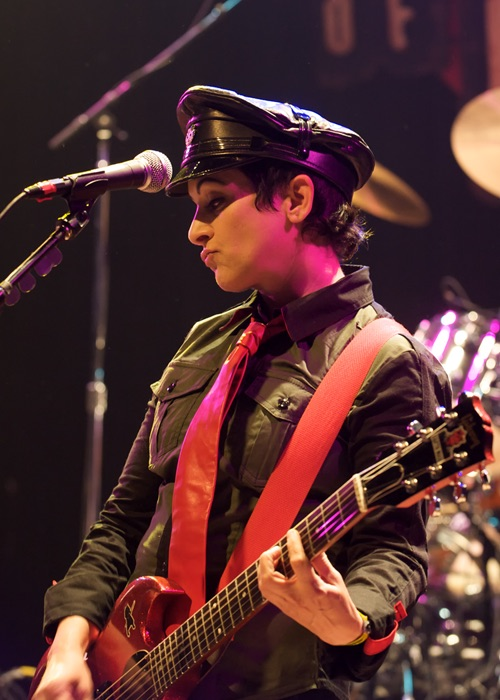
- Wiedlin performing at the House of Blues in Los Angeles in April 2009

Background information
- Also known as: Jane Drano, Reverend Sister Go-Go
- Born: May 20, 1958 (age 68); Oconomowoc, Wisconsin, U.S.
- Genres: New wave; pop rock; power pop; punk
- Occupations: Musician; singer; songwriter; actress
- Instruments: Vocals; guitar
- Years active: 1978–present
- Labels: EMI; IRS; Painful Discs
- Member of: The Go-Go's; the Hex Girls (non-virtual)
- Formerly of: froSTed
- Website: janewiedlin.com

Jane Wiedlin (/ˈwiːdlɪn/ WEED-lin; born May 20, 1958) is an American musician, singer, songwriter, and actress, best known as the co-founder, rhythm guitarist, and backing vocalist of the new wave band the Go-Go's. She voices Dusk, the drummer and backup vocalist of the fictional rock band the Hex Girls. She also had a successful solo career.

The Go-Go's became one of the most successful American bands of the 1980s, helping popularize new wave music with songs including "We Got the Beat", "Our Lips Are Sealed", and "Vacation". As a solo artist, Wiedlin's "Rush Hour" peaked at number 9 on the Billboard Hot 100. As an actress, she had roles as the singing telegram girl in Clue (1985) and as Joan of Arc in Bill & Ted's Excellent Adventure (1989).

As a member of the Go-Go's, Wiedlin received a star on the Hollywood Walk of Fame. She and the band were inducted into the Rock and Roll Hall of Fame in 2021.

== Early life ==
Wiedlin was born in Oconomowoc, Wisconsin. Her father, Robert Arthur Wiedlin Sr., an oral surgeon of German and Swiss ancestry, was born in Chicago. Her mother, Betty Jane (née Herro), was of Lebanese heritage. Wiedlin's parents met as students at Marquette University in Milwaukee. She is one of five children, with a sister and three brothers, and grew up Catholic. During Wiedlin's early childhood, her family lived in West Allis, a suburb of Milwaukee. When she was six, her father took a job with the United States Department of Veterans Affairs at a VA hospital in Los Angeles, and the family then moved to the city.

Wiedlin has said, "I remember my childhood as extremely idyllic." She has mentioned her adolescence having angst and hope by saying, "I was a depressed teenager. I thought life was completely pointless when I was in high school, but just a few short years later I was having the adventure of a lifetime in a successful rock band!" She attended William Howard Taft High School in Los Angeles from 1972 to 1976.

== Career ==
=== The Go-Go's ===
According to Wiedlin, she was present "pretty much from the beginning" of the Los Angeles punk scene. While attending college in the Los Angeles area and studying fashion design, she worked at a fashion-design house where she wrote song lyrics and scribbled ideas for songs on clothing patterns. Under the moniker Jane Drano, she designed and sold punk-style clothing at Granny Takes a Trip, a store on Sunset Boulevard. She became part of the scene which spawned bands including X, the Germs, and the Weirdos.

Wiedlin and Belinda Carlisle formed the Go-Go's as a punk band in 1978, with Margot Olaverra on bass and Elissa Bello on drums. In 1981, Wiedlin and Terry Hall of Fun Boy Three and the Specials co-wrote "Our Lips Are Sealed". The song peaked on the Billboard Hot 100 chart at No. 20, where it remained until 1982. After a series of reunions during the 1990s, Wiedlin, Carlisle, Caffey, Schock, and Valentine reunited in 2000 to record God Bless the Go-Go's, their first studio album in 17 years. The album's title and concept came from Wiedlin. In 2010, the Go-Go's announced their "Happily Ever After" farewell tour, which was intended to begin in July. However, it was canceled after Wiedlin fell down a cliff during a nighttime hike and suffered ACL tears in both knees. The Go-Go's announced an 11-date reunion tour scheduled to begin in June 2020. It was postponed in May 2020 due to the COVID-19 pandemic.

In May 2021 it was announced that the Go-Go's would be inducted into the Rock and Roll Hall of Fame on October 30, 2021. The band continued touring into 2022, before announcing their breakup. They did a one-off reunion in 2024 after being inducted into the California Hall of Fame.

=== Solo career ===
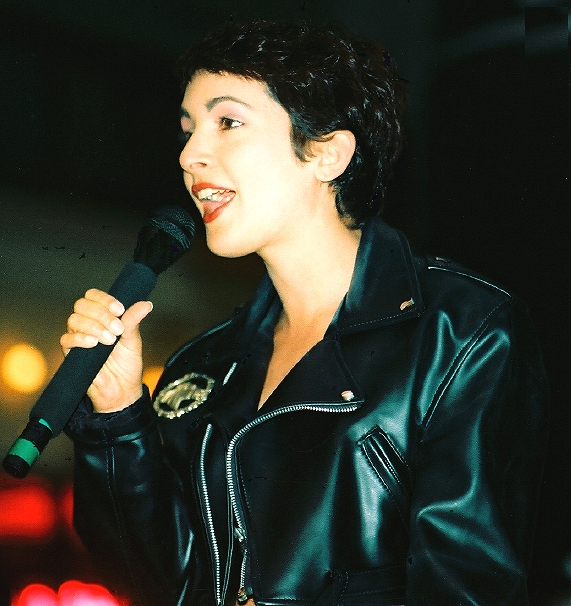
Wiedlin performing at the Philadelphia Bourse in 1988

Wiedlin has released four solo albums: Jane Wiedlin in 1985, Fur in 1988, Tangled in 1990, and Kissproof World in 2000. From 1995 to 1998, she was also a member of the band froSTed, which released one album, Cold, in 1996. In 2017, Wiedlin teamed up with the American-born Italian multi-instrumentalist and songwriter Pietro Straccia to form a new psychedelic/pop/harmony and guitar-driven duo called Elettrodomestico.

=== Acting career ===
Wiedlin's early acting credits include an ill-fated singing telegram girl in Clue (1985), a brief appearance as an officer seen on a Starfleet Command video screen in Star Trek IV: The Voyage Home (1986), the White Fairy in Golan-Globus's Sleeping Beauty (1987) and as Joan of Arc in Bill & Ted's Excellent Adventure (1989). Of her 1980s acting career, she said, "It turned out to be much harder than it looks, and as much as I enjoyed those experiences, I don't think I'm very good at it."

In 2001, she had a regular role in MTV's Spyder Games, portraying the "ex-rock chick who runs the local coffee house" where the characters hang out. In 2005, she appeared as herself on the fourth season of VH1's The Surreal Life, in which she talked about her interest in bdsm. She portrayed the role of Ursula in Steve Balderson's 2005 surrealist crime drama film Firecracker, which Roger Ebert listed among the year's best films. She worked a further three times with director Balderson, in Stuck! (2009), an homage to film noir women in prison dramas, The Casserole Club (2011), about married swingers in 1960s Palm Springs, and Culture Shock (2013), a crime spoof set in London.

She played Tess in the 2011 independent movie I Want to Get Married, and played a math teacher in the 2016 horror film HoneyBee. She has provided voices for characters in television and film animation, such as Miranda Kane and Shannon in The New Batman Adventures, Gwen in Mission Hill, and Dusk of the Hex Girls in the Scooby-Doo franchise.

== Filmography ==
=== Film ===
Year	Title	Role	Notes
1985	Clue	Singing Telegram Girl	
1986	Star Trek IV: The Voyage Home	Alien Communications Officer	
1987	Sleeping Beauty	White Fairy	
1989	Bill & Ted's Excellent Adventure	Joan of Arc	
1999	Scooby-Doo! and the Witch's Ghost	Dusk (voice)	
2000	Angels!	Agent 77	
2003	Scooby-Doo! and the Legend of the Vampire	Dusk (voice)	
2005	Firecracker	Ursula	
2009	Stuck!	Princess	
2010	Demonic Toys 2	Baby Whoopsie (voice)	
2011	The Casserole Club	Marjorie Lavon	
2011	I Want to Get Married	Tess	
2012	Culture Shock	Baby Boo Boo	
2016	HoneyBee	Mrs. Humphrey	
2021	The Sparks Brothers	Herself	Documentary

=== Television ===
Year	Title	Role	Notes
1998	The New Batman Adventures	Miranda Kane, Shannon (voice)	2 episodes
1999	Pinky, Elmyra & the Brain	Vanity White (voice)	4 episodes
1999–2002	Mission Hill	Gwen (voice)	7 episodes
2000	The Wild Thornberrys	Phaedra (voice)	2 episodes
2000	Behind the Music	Herself	Episode: "The Go-Go's"
2002–2003	What's New, Scooby-Doo?	Dusk, Backup Singer (voice)	2 episodes
2003	As Told by Ginger	Hope Rogers (voice)	Episode: "No Hope for Courtney"
2003	Duck Dodgers	Cassiopeia (voice)	Episode: "They Stole Dodgers' Brain"
2005	Rugrats Pre-School Daze	Willy (voice)	3 episodes
2005	The Surreal Life	Herself	
2010–2013	Scooby-Doo! Mystery Incorporated	Dusk (voice)	2 episodes
2012	Behind the Music: Remastered	Herself	Episode: "The Go-Go's"
2020	Scooby-Doo and Guess Who?	Dusk (voice)	Episode: "I Put a Hex On You!"

== Other work ==
In 2000, Wiedlin and fellow Go-Go's member Charlotte Caffey co-wrote Keith Urban's first number one song, "But for the Grace of God". Wiedlin contributed quotations to Girls Against Girls by author Bonnie Burton. Wiedlin was a contributing writer to the Los Angeles punk rock books Under the Big Black Sun (2016) and More Fun in the New World (2019) by John Doe and Tom DeSavia. In April 2009, Wiedlin was photographed as Bettie Page by Austin Young for the "Heaven Bound" art show. A number of her songs were featured in the 2018 debut of the Broadway musical Head Over Heels, with a story suggested by Philip Sidney's Arcadia set to the songs of the Go-Go's and Belinda Carlisle.

In April 2026 Da Capo Press announced that they will be publishing Jane's memoir "TMI: Memoirs of a Go-Go" in November 2026.

== Personal life ==
A long-time animal rights activist, Wiedlin has worked with PETA since 1989 when she performed as part of a "Rock Against Fur" concert in New York City. She is a friend of PETA executive Dan Mathews. Wiedlin has discussed her struggles with depression and mental health, and how it affected her at several stages of her life: a suicide attempt in high school, and the effects fame (and a lack of healthy coping mechanisms) had on her wellbeing.

During Wiedlin's time in the Los Angeles punk scene, her first real boyfriend was Terry Bag (Terry Graham) of the punk band the Bags. She later had what she called a "short but dramatic romance" with Terry Hall of the Specials during a 1980 British tour. Hall later sent her some lyrics prompted by their relationship, inspiring Wiedlin to write "Our Lips Are Sealed", a song on which Hall has co-writer credit and recorded with his own band, Fun Boy Three. In the 2020 documentary The Go-Go's, bandmate Gina Schock said that she and Wiedlin were "girlfriends" for a time until Wiedlin broke up with her. Wiedlin also had a brief relationship with Russell Mael of the band Sparks.

Wiedlin is bisexual.

In addition to acting and singing, Wiedlin is an ordained minister of the Universal Life Church, a mail-order religious organization that offers anyone semi-immediate, no-cost ordination as a ULC minister. Wiedlin identifies herself as "Reverend Sister Go-Go", primarily officiating at weddings.

Wiedlin and Ged Malone were married on July 25, 1987 and divorced in 1999. She then married David Trotter on June 8, 2004; they divorced in 2005. Wiedlin became engaged to her boyfriend Terence Lundy in October 2022. They married in February 2023. She announced their divorce in April 2024.

As an adult, Wiedlin has lived in various places: Mendocino County, California; Costa Rica; Panama; Wisconsin; San Francisco; and Hawaii. In December 2023, in an exposé by Rolling Stone, Wiedlin alleged that rock DJ Rodney Bingenheimer sexually assaulted her at his English Disco nightclub in Los Angeles when she was around 15 c. 1974.

== Discography ==
=== Studio albums ===
Title	Album details	Peak chart positions			
Title	Album details	US	CAN	SWE	UK
Jane Wiedlin	Release date: October 1985; Label: IRS	127	—	—	—
Fur	Release date: 1988; Label: EMI, Manhattan	105	88	48	48
Tangled	Release date: 1990; Label: EMI USA	—	—	—	—
Kissproof World	Release date: October 31, 2000; Label: Painful Discs	—	—	—	—
¡I Protest!	Release date: November 2026; Label: Independent	—	—	—	—
"—" denotes releases that did not chart

=== Compilation albums ===
Title	Album details
The Very Best of Jane Wiedlin: From Cool Places to Worlds on Fire	Release date: 1993; Label: Alliance, EMI

=== Singles ===
Title	Year	Peak chart positions					Album
Title	Year	US	US Dance	CAN	NZ	UK	Album
"Blue Kiss"	1985	77	30	62	—	—	Jane Wiedlin
"Rush Hour"	1988	9	—	13	31	12	Fur
"Inside a Dream"	1988	57	—	—	—	64	Fur
"World on Fire"	1990	—	—	—	—	—	Tangled
"—" denotes releases that did not chart

=== Featured singles ===
Title	Year	Peak chart positions		Album
Title	Year	US	US Dance	Album
"Cool Places" (Sparks featuring Jane Wiedlin)	1983	49	13	In Outer Space

== Other releases ==
- 1990 Pretty Woman soundtrack (EMI, re-released 2006, with bonus disc) – "Tangled"
- 1996 Cold (Geffen Records) – As froSTed
- 2001 Josie and the Pussycats Original Soundtrack – Contributor on "You Don't See" and "Come On"
- 2002 The Specials vs. the Untouchables: Ska's Greatest Stars (Big Eye Music) – Rearrangement of "Our Lips Are Sealed" with the Specials
- 2006 80's New Wave Hits (Big Eye Music) – Rearrangement of "Our Lips Are Sealed" with the Specials
- 2017 Elettrodomestico (If You're a Boy or a Girl)
