= Supanova Expo =

Multi-genre fan conventions in Australia

Supanova Comic Con & Gaming
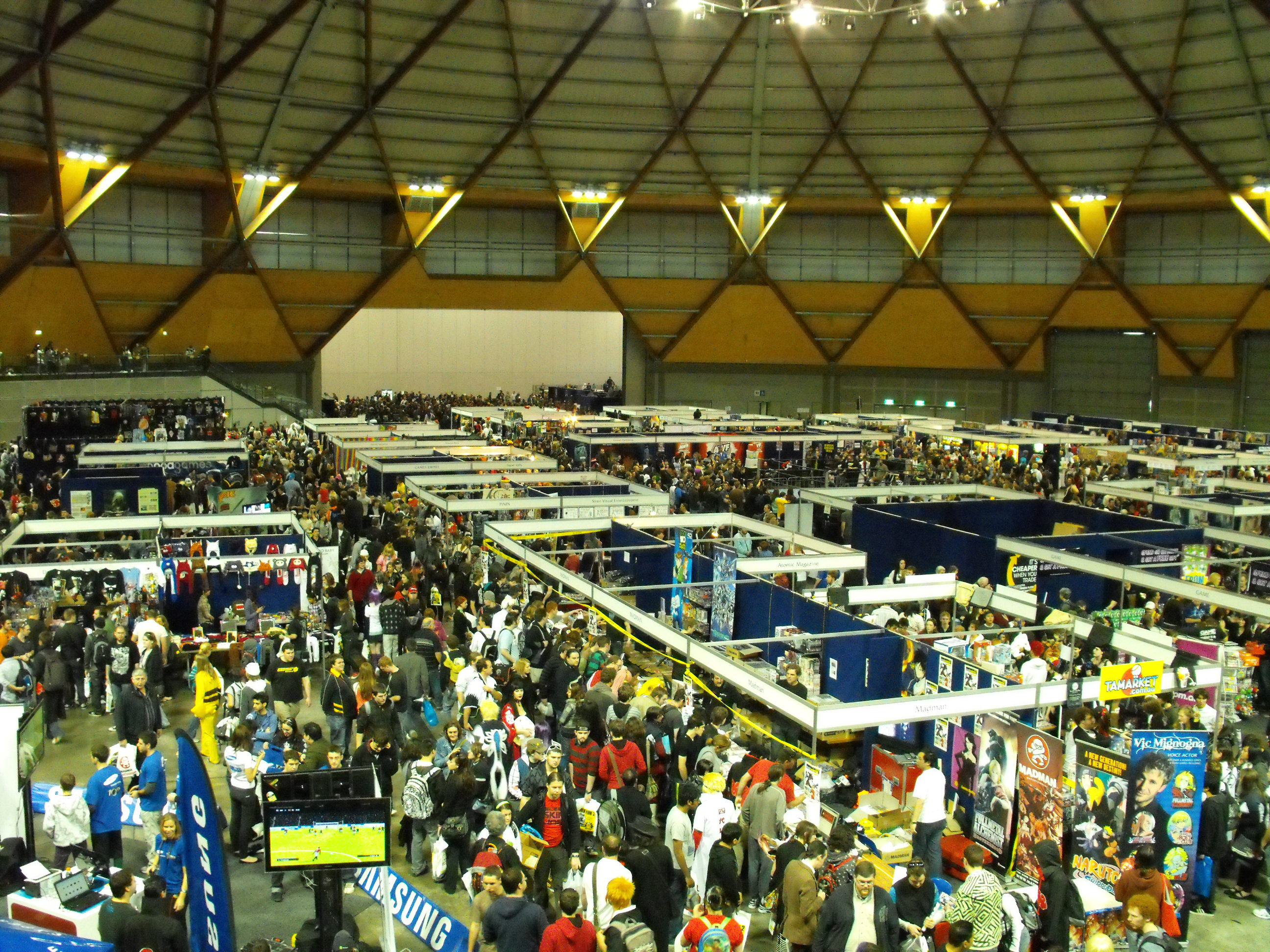
- The exhibition floor at Supanova Sydney 2010
- Genre: Speculative fiction
- Venue: Various
- Locations: Sydney (2002–present); Brisbane (2003–present); Melbourne (2008–present); Perth (2008–present); Adelaide (2012–present); Gold Coast (2012–present)
- Country: Australia
- Inaugurated: 2002
- Organizer: Supanova Pop Culture Industries
- Filing status: For profit
- Website: http://www.supanova.com.au/

Supanova Comic Con & Gaming (also simply known as Supanova) is a fan convention focusing on science fiction and fantasy film and TV, comic books, anime, gaming and collectables. It is held annually in the Australian cities of Sydney, Brisbane, Melbourne, Perth, Adelaide and the Gold Coast.

The convention was originally named Supanova Pop Culture Expo and was first held in Sydney in 2002. In 2022, Supanova celebrated 20 years of conventions. The 100th Supanova convention was held in Brisbane in November 2024.

== Convention ==
Supanova is an Australian-made, independent event not affiliated with foreign exposition producers. It is managed by a team of permanent staff, and was founded by Daniel Zachariou, who also served as Event Director until 2021. There are also a large number of volunteers, generally appointed on an event-by-event basis, who assist with the on-site running of the convention.

One of the major attractions at Supanova is the special guests - often well-known personalities of interest to convention attendees who participate in signing sessions and panel discussions with their fans. Other notable attractions at Supanova include the cosplay competition, the "Artist's Alley" where aspiring artists can display and sell their work, and the anime theatre. On many occasions Supanova has also hosted, as satellite events, artwork masterclasses, film screenings or similar activities. There is a large exhibitors area at Supanova where attendees can purchase merchandise from one of the many traders present.

As of 2014, Supanova is held at the Melbourne Showgrounds and Gold Coast Convention & Exhibition Centre in April, followed by Sydney Olympic Park and Perth Convention & Exhibition Centre events in June, and finally at the Brisbane Convention & Exhibition Centre and Adelaide Showground in November. Supanova's Sydney event was formerly held at the Wharf 8 Function Centre in King Street Wharf, from 2003 to 2005, before returning to Olympic Park in 2006. 2013 was the last time the event was held in Brisbane at the RNA Showgrounds (2003–2013) and Perth's Claremont Showground (2008–2013) having outgrown both venues.

== History ==
The first Supanova was held at the Sydney Showground on the weekend of 20–21 April 2002. It was the successor to comicfest!, four similar conventions under the same management held between March 2000 and November 2002 in Sydney. On the weekend of 13–14 September 2003, Supanova held its first convention in the city of Brisbane at the RNA Showgrounds. In 2008, Supanova expanded to include Melbourne (back-to-back with Brisbane) and Perth (back-to-back with Sydney). In 2012, the convention expanded again, arriving on the Gold Coast and Adelaide for the first time. As of 2013, the combined annual attendance across Supanova's six events was estimated at 160,000 (From 11,600 to 39,400 in 2013 across all cities) with the largest attendance of 50,800 fans participating at the Sydney expo, June 2014.

In 2017, Supanova announced that they had rebranded from Supanova Pop Culture Expo to Supanova Comic Con & Gaming, citing that the video games industry had made significant strides within the industry, and the ambiguity of the "pop culture expo" branding.

In 2020, the COVID-19 pandemic forced the cancellation of the Sydney, Brisbane, Perth and Adelaide events, with the 2021 Perth and Adelaide conventions also cancelled due to border restrictions. After this, the Friday sessions of Supanova that ran from 2006 to 2019 were removed from the schedule when the convention resumed. However, they were brought back in 2024 at the Brisbane convention, with the Friday session being called 'Level Up' and geared more towards students but still with the usual convention crowd and exhibitors as well as some panels and guest signings on the day. In 2025 it was expanded to also include Adelaide as well as Brisbane, and in 2026 the Friday session also returned to the Sydney convention, whilst also remaining a fixture for the Adelaide and Brisbane conventions.

== Events ==
Year	Location	Venue	Dates	Guests
2002	Sydney	Sydney Showground, Olympic Park	April, Saturday 20th & Sunday 21st	
2003	Sydney	Wharf 8 Function Center, King Street Wharf	April, Saturday 5th & Sunday 6th	
2003	Brisbane	RNA Showgrounds	September, Saturday 13th & Sunday 14th	
2004	Sydney	Wharf 8 Function Center, King Street Wharf	May, Saturday 1st & Sunday 2nd	
2004	Brisbane	RNA Showgrounds	September, Saturday 18th & Sunday 19th	
2005	Brisbane	RNA Showgrounds	April, Saturday 9th & Sunday 10th	
2005	Sydney	Wharf 8 Function Center, King Street Wharf	October, Saturday 15th & Sunday 16th	
2006	Brisbane	RNA Showgrounds	April, Friday 21st, Saturday 22nd & Sunday 23rd	
2006	Sydney	Sydney Showground, Olympic Park	October, Friday 27th, Saturday 28th & Sunday 29th	
2007	Brisbane	RNA Showgrounds	April, Friday 13th, Saturday 14th & Sunday 15th	
2007	Sydney	Sydney Showground, Olympic Park	October, Friday 12th, Saturday 13th & Sunday 14th	
2008	Melbourne	Melbourne Showgrounds	March, Friday 28th, Saturday 29th & Sunday 30th	
2008	Brisbane	RNA Showgrounds	April, Friday 4th, Saturday 5th & Sunday 6th	
2008	Sydney	Sydney Showground, Olympic Park	June, Friday 20th, Saturday 21st & Sunday 22nd	
2008	Perth	Claremont Showground	June, Friday 27th, Saturday 28th & Sunday 29th	
2009	Melbourne	Melbourne Showgrounds	March, Friday 27th, Saturday 28th & Sunday 29th	
2009	Brisbane	RNA Showgrounds	April, Friday 3rd, Saturday 4th & Sunday 5th	
2009	Sydney	Sydney Showground, Olympic Park	June, Friday 26th, Saturday 27th & Sunday 28th	
2009	Perth	Claremont Showground	July, Friday 3rd, Saturday 4th & Sunday 5th	
2010	Brisbane	RNA Showgrounds	April, Friday 9th, Saturday 10th & Sunday 11th	
2010	Melbourne	Melbourne Showgrounds	April, Friday 16th, Saturday 17th & Sunday 18th	
2010	Sydney	Sydney Showground, Olympic Park	June, Friday 18th, Saturday 19th & Sunday 20th	
2010	Perth	Claremont Showground	June, Friday 25th, Saturday 26th & Sunday 27th	
2011	Brisbane	RNA Showgrounds	April, Friday 1st, Saturday 2nd & Sunday 3rd	
2011	Melbourne	Melbourne Showgrounds	April, Friday 8th, Saturday 9th & Sunday 10th	
2011	Sydney	Sydney Showground, Olympic Park	June, Friday 17th, Saturday 18th & Sunday 19th	
2011	Perth	Claremont Showground	June, Friday 24th, Saturday 25th & Sunday 26th	
2011	Brisbane	RNA Showgrounds	November, Friday 4th, Saturday 5th & Sunday 6th	
2012	Melbourne	Melbourne Showgrounds	April, Friday 13th, Saturday 14th & Sunday 15th	
2012	Gold Coast	Gold Coast Convention & Exhibition Centre	April, Friday 20th, Saturday 21st & Sunday 22nd	
2012	Sydney	Sydney Showground, Olympic Park	June, Friday 15th, Saturday 16th & Sunday 17th	
2012	Perth	Claremont Showground	June, Friday 22nd, Saturday 23rd & Sunday 24th	
2012	Brisbane	RNA Showgrounds	November, Friday 9th, Saturday 10th, Sunday 11th	
2012	Adelaide	Adelaide Showground	November, Friday 16th, Saturday 17th, Sunday 18th	
2013	Melbourne	Melbourne Showgrounds	April, Friday 12th, Saturday 13th & Sunday 14th	
2013	Gold Coast	Gold Coast Convention & Exhibition Centre	April, Friday 19th, Saturday 20th & Sunday 21st	
2013	Sydney	Sydney Showground, Olympic Park	June, Friday 21st, Saturday 22nd & Sunday 23rd	
2013	Perth	Claremont Showground	June, Friday 28th, Saturday 29th & Sunday 30th	
2013	Brisbane	RNA Showgrounds	November, Friday 8th, Saturday 9th & Sunday 10th	
2013	Adelaide	Adelaide Showground	November, Friday 15th, Saturday 16th & Sunday 17th	
2014	Gold Coast	Gold Coast Convention & Exhibition Centre	April, Friday 4th, Saturday 5th & Sunday 6th	
2014	Melbourne	Melbourne Showgrounds	April, Friday 11th, Saturday 12th & Sunday 13th	
2014	Sydney	Sydney Showground, Olympic Park	June, Friday 13th, Saturday 14th & Sunday 15th	
2014	Perth	Perth Convention & Exhibition Centre	June, Friday 20th, Saturday 21st & Sunday 22nd	
2014	Adelaide	Adelaide Showground	November, Friday 21st, Saturday 22nd & Sunday 23rd	
2014	Brisbane	Brisbane Convention & Exhibition Centre	November, Friday 28th, Saturday 29th & Sunday 30th	
2015	Melbourne	Melbourne Showgrounds	April, Friday 10th, Saturday 11th & Sunday 12th	
2015	Gold Coast	Gold Coast Convention & Exhibition Centre	April, Friday 17th, Saturday 18th & Sunday 19th	
2015	Sydney	Sydney Showground, Olympic Park	June, Friday 19th, Saturday 20th & Sunday 21st	
2015	Perth	Perth Convention & Exhibition Centre	June, Friday 26th, Saturday 27th & Sunday 28th	
2015	Adelaide	Adelaide Showground	November, Friday 20th, Saturday 21st & Sunday 22nd	
2015	Brisbane	Brisbane Convention & Exhibition Centre	November, Friday 27th, Saturday 28th & Sunday 29th	
2016	Gold Coast	Gold Coast Convention & Exhibition Centre	April, Friday 8th, Saturday 9th & Sunday 10th	
2016	Melbourne	Melbourne Showgrounds	April, Friday 15th, Saturday 16th & Sunday 17th	
2016	Sydney	Sydney Showground, Olympic Park	June, Friday 17th, Saturday 18th & Sunday 19th	
2016	Perth	Perth Convention & Exhibition Centre	June, Friday 24th, Saturday 25th & Sunday 26th	
2016	Brisbane	Brisbane Convention & Exhibition Centre	November, Friday 11th, Saturday 12th & Sunday 13th	
2016	Adelaide	Adelaide Showground	November, Friday 18th, Saturday 19th & Sunday 20th	
2017	Gold Coast	Gold Coast Convention & Exhibition Centre	April, Friday 21st, Saturday 22nd & Sunday 23rd	
2017	Melbourne	Melbourne Showgrounds	April, Friday 28th, Saturday 29th & Sunday 30th	
2017	Sydney	Sydney Showground, Olympic Park	June, Friday 16th, Saturday 17th & Sunday 18th	
2017	Perth	Perth Convention & Exhibition Centre	June, Friday 23rd, Saturday 24th & Sunday 25th	
2017	Brisbane	Brisbane Convention & Exhibition Centre	November, Friday 10th, Saturday 11th & Sunday 12th	
2017	Adelaide	Adelaide Showground	November, Friday 17th, Saturday 18th & Sunday 19th	
2018	Melbourne	Melbourne Showgrounds	April, Friday 20th, Saturday 21st & Sunday 22nd	
2018	Gold Coast, Queensland	Gold Coast Convention & Exhibition Centre	April, Friday 27th, Saturday 28th & Sunday 29th	
2018	Sydney	Sydney Showground, Olympic Park	June, Friday 15th, Saturday 16th & Sunday 17th	
2018	Perth	Perth Convention & Exhibition Centre	June, Friday 22nd, Saturday 23rd & Sunday 24th	
2018	Adelaide	Adelaide Showground	November, Friday 2nd, Saturday 3rd & Sunday 4th	
2018	Brisbane	Brisbane Convention & Exhibition Centre	November, Friday 9th, Saturday 10th & Sunday 11th	
2019	Melbourne	Melbourne Showgrounds	April, Friday 5th, Saturday 6th & Sunday 7th	
2019	Gold Coast	Gold Coast Convention & Exhibition Centre	April, Friday 12th, Saturday 13th & Sunday 14th	
2019	Sydney	Sydney Showground, Olympic Park	June, Friday 21st, Saturday 22nd & Sunday 23rd	
2019	Perth	Perth Convention & Exhibition Centre	June, Friday 28th, Saturday 29th & Sunday 30th	
2019	Adelaide	Adelaide Showground	November, Friday 1st, Saturday 2nd & Sunday 3rd	
2019	Brisbane	Brisbane Convention & Exhibition Centre	November, Friday 8th, Saturday 9th & Sunday 10th	
2020	Melbourne	Melbourne Showgrounds	March, Friday 6th, Saturday 7th & Sunday 8th	
2020	Gold Coast	Gold Coast Convention & Exhibition Centre	March, Friday 13th & Saturday 14th	
2020	Sydney	Sydney Showground, Olympic Park	Cancelled	
2020	Perth	Perth Convention & Exhibition Centre	Cancelled	
2020	Brisbane	Brisbane Convention & Exhibition Centre	Cancelled	
2020	Adelaide	Adelaide Showground	Cancelled	
2021	Gold Coast	Gold Coast Convention & Exhibition Centre	April, Saturday 17th & Sunday 18th	
2021	Melbourne	Melbourne Showgrounds	May, Saturday 22nd & Sunday 23rd	
2021	Sydney	Sydney Showground, Olympic Park	June, Monday 14th	
2021	Perth	Perth Convention & Exhibition Centre	Cancelled	
2021	Adelaide	Adelaide Showground	Cancelled	
2021	Brisbane	Brisbane Convention & Exhibition Centre	November, Saturday 6th & Sunday 7th	
2022	Melbourne	Melbourne Showgrounds	March, Saturday 5th & Sunday 6th	Katie Leung, Emilie de Ravin, Nicholas Hammond, Glenn McMillan, Josh Lawson, Temuera Morrison, Todd Lasance, John Jarratt, Lincoln Lewis, Neil Fanning
2022	Gold Coast	Gold Coast Convention & Exhibition Centre	April, Saturday 9th & Sunday 10th	Katie Leung, Emilie de Ravin, Nicholas Hammond, Glenn McMillan, Josh Lawson, Temuera Morrison, Todd Lasance, John Jarratt, Lincoln Lewis, Neil Fanning
2022	Sydney	Sydney Showground, Olympic Park	June, Saturday 18th & Sunday 19th	James and Oliver Phelps, Michael Rosenbaum, Jennifer Blanc, Michael Biehn, Emilie de Ravin, Mark Sheppard, Scott Brewer, Eoin Macken, Aaron Glenane, Daniel Webber, Todd Lasance, Matt Doran, John Jarratt, Stephen Hunter, Veronica Taylor
2022	Perth	Perth Convention & Exhibition Centre	June, Saturday 25th & Sunday 26th	Michael Rosenbaum, Jennifer Blanc, Michael Biehn, Emilie de Ravin, Mark Sheppard, Scott Brewer, Eoin Macken, Aaron Glenane, Daniel Webber, Todd Lasance, Matt Doran, John Jarratt, Stephen Hunter, Veronica Taylor
2022	Brisbane	Brisbane Convention & Exhibition Centre	November, Saturday 5th & Sunday 6th	Sam J. Jones, Alex Kingston, Chandler Riggs, Jennifer Blanc, Michael Biehn, Bob Morley, John Jarratt, Lincoln Lewis, Neil Fanning
2022	Adelaide	Adelaide Showgrounds	November, Saturday 12th & Sunday 13th	Sam J. Jones, Alex Kingston, Chandler Riggs, Jennifer Blanc, Michael Biehn, Bob Morley, John Jarratt, Lincoln Lewis, Neil Fanning
2023	Melbourne	Melbourne Showground	April, Saturday 22nd & Sunday 23rd	Katie Cassidy, Stephen Amell, Mark Sheppard, Emilie de Ravin, Emily Bett Rickards, Thomas Surprenant, Kevin Sussman, Temuera Morrison, Stephen Hunter, Richard Brancatisano, Matt Doran, Todd Lasance, Lincoln Lewis, Jim Cummings, Veronica Taylor, Neil Fanning
2023	Gold Coast	Gold Coast Convention & Exhibition Centre	April, Saturday 15th & Sunday 16th	Katie Cassidy, Stephen Amell, Mark Sheppard, Emilie de Ravin, Emily Bett Rickards, Thomas Surprenant, Kevin Sussman, Temuera Morrison, Stephen Hunter, Richard Brancatisano, Matt Doran, Todd Lasance, Lincoln Lewis, Jim Cummings, Veronica Taylor, Neil Fanning
2023	Sydney	Sydney Showgrounds, Olympic Park	June, Saturday 17th & Sunday 18th	Alyssa Milano, Tyler Hoechlin, Elizabeth Tulloch, Ian McElhinney, Barry Pearl, Temuera Morrison, Stephen Hunter, Nicholas Hammond, Matt Doran, Todd Lasance, Lincoln Lewis, Ryan Corr, Cristina Vee, Jim Cummings, Neil Fanning
2023	Perth	Perth Convention & Exhibition Centre	June, Saturday 24th & Sunday 25th	Alyssa Milano, Tyler Hoechlin, Elizabeth Tulloch, Ian McElhinney, Barry Pearl, Temuera Morrison, Stephen Hunter, Nicholas Hammond, Matt Doran, Todd Lasance, Lincoln Lewis, Ryan Corr, Cristina Vee, Jim Cummings, Neil Fanning
2023	Adelaide	Adelaide Showgrounds	November, Saturday 4th & Sunday 5th	Laz Alonso, Joshua Orpin, Morgan Davies, Temuera Morrison, Lincoln Lewis, Mark Dacascos, Ryan Corr, Nikola Djuricko, Frazer Hines, Colleen O'Shaughnessey, Eric Stuart, Stephen Hunter
2023	Brisbane	Brisbane Convention & Exhibition Centre	November, Saturday 11th & Sunday 12th	Laz Alonso, Joshua Orpin, Morgan Davies, Temuera Morrison, Matt Doran, Lincoln Lewis, Mark Dacascos, Ryan Corr, Nikola Djuricko, Frazer Hines, Colleen O'Shaughnessey, Eric Stuart, Stephen Hunter
2024	Melbourne	Melbourne Showground	April, Saturday 6th & Sunday 7th	Jodie Whittaker, Emily Bett Rickards, Evanna Lynch, Temuera Morrison, Karen Fukuhara, Antonio Sabato Jr., Steve Bisley, Tim Burns, Barry Pearl, Gerard O’Dwyer, Todd Lasance, Matt Doran, John Jarratt, Lincoln Lewis, Phil LaMarr, Neil Fanning
2024	Gold Coast	Gold Coast Convention & Exhibition Centre	April, Saturday 13th & Sunday 14th	Jodie Whittaker, Emily Bett Rickards, Evanna Lynch, Temuera Morrison, Karen Fukuhara, Antonio Sabato Jr., Steve Bisley, Tim Burns, Barry Pearl, Gerard O’Dwyer, Todd Lasance, Matt Doran, John Jarratt, Lincoln Lewis, Phil LaMarr, Neil Fanning
2024	Sydney	Sydney Showgrounds, Olympic Park	June, Saturday 22nd & Sunday 23rd	Sophia Di Martino, J. Michael Straczynski, Robert Patrick, Kat Graham, James Marsters, Aly Michalka, Temuera Morrison, Lindsay Wagner, Vernon Wells, Roger Ward, Joanne Samuel, Matt Doran, Steve Bisley, Tim Burns, John Jarratt, Lincoln Lewis, Stephen Hunter, Debi Derryberry, Neil Fanning
2024	Perth	Perth Convention & Exhibition Centre	June, Saturday 29th & Sunday 30th	Sophia Di Martino, J. Michael Straczynski, Robert Patrick, Kat Graham, James Marsters, Aly Michalka, Temuera Morrison, Lindsay Wagner, Vernon Wells, Roger Ward, Joanne Samuel, Matt Doran, Steve Bisley, Tim Burns, John Jarratt, Lincoln Lewis, Stephen Hunter, Debi Derryberry, Neil Fanning
2024	Adelaide	Adelaide Showgrounds	November, Saturday 2nd & Sunday 3rd	Anthony Daniels, Adam Savage, Martin Kove, Jesse Kove, James Marsters, Steven John Ward, Temuera Morrison, Bob Morley, David Wenham, Todd Lasance, Matt Doran, Nathan Jones, John Jarratt, Lincoln Lewis, Roger Craig Smith, Veronica Taylor, Neil Fanning, Miranda Otto
2024	Brisbane	Brisbane Convention & Exhibition Centre	November, Friday 8th, Saturday 9th & Sunday 10th	Anthony Daniels, Adam Savage, Martin Kove, Jesse Kove, James Marsters, Steven John Ward, Temuera Morrison, Bob Morley, David Wenham, Todd Lasance, Matt Doran, Nathan Jones, John Jarratt, Lincoln Lewis, Roger Craig Smith, Veronica Taylor, Neil Fanning
2025	Melbourne	Melbourne Showground	March, Saturday 29th & Sunday 30th	Tyler Hoechlin, Doug Jones, Rena Owen, Michelle Ang, Mike Quinn, Temuera Morrison, Mitchell Hope, Jaason Simmons, Stephen Hunter, Alex Proyas, Cristina Vee, Sarah Natochenny, Neil Fanning
2025	Gold Coast	Gold Coast Convention & Exhibition Centre	April, Saturday 12th & Sunday 13th	Tyler Hoechlin, Doug Jones, Rena Owen, Michelle Ang, Mike Quinn, Temuera Morrison, Mitchell Hope, Jaason Simmons, Stephen Hunter, Cristina Vee, Sarah Natochenny, Lincoln Lewis
2025	Sydney	Sydney Showgrounds, Olympic Park	June, Saturday 21st & Sunday 22nd	Evangeline Lilly, Sam Heughan, Alex Kingston, Billy Zane, Tia Carrere, Robert Taylor, Chandler Riggs, David Berry, Charles Vandervaart, Brendan Wayne, Adam Bartley, Matt Doran, Rena Owen, Stephen Hunter, John Jarratt, Alex Proyas, Lincoln Lewis, Neil Fanning
2025	Perth	Perth Convention & Exhibition Centre	June, Saturday 28th & Sunday 29th	Evangeline Lilly, Sam Heughan, Alex Kingston, Billy Zane, Robert Taylor, David Berry, Charles Vandervaart, Brendan Wayne, Adam Bartley, Matt Doran, Rena Owen, Stephen Hunter, Lincoln Lewis, John Jarratt, Neil Fanning
2025	Adelaide	Adelaide Showgrounds	October, Friday 31st. November, Saturday 1st & Sunday 2nd	John Boyega, Adam Spencer, Holly Marie Combs, Brian Krause, Georgie Farmer, Alex Garfin, John Jarratt, Alex Proyas, Veronica Taylor, Jim Cummings, Nolan North, Mari Shimizu, Lincoln Lewis, Billie Piper
2025	Brisbane	Brisbane Convention & Exhibition Centre	November, Friday 7th, Saturday 8th & Sunday 9th	John Boyega, Michael Peña, Adam Spencer, Holly Marie Combs, Brian Krause, Georgie Farmer, Alex Garfin, Lincoln Lewis, Alex Proyas, Veronica Taylor, Jim Cummings, Nolan North, Mari Shimizu, Neil Fanning
2026	Gold Coast	Gold Coast Convention & Exhibition Centre	April,Saturday 11th & Sunday 12th	Jamie Campbell Bower, Karl Urban (Sunday only), Bonnie Wright, Morgan Davies, Ernie Hudson, James Marsters, Rick Cosnett, Stephen Hunter, Lincoln Lewis, Neil Fanning
2026	Melbourne	Melbourne Showground	April, Saturday 18th & Sunday 19th	Jamie Campbell Bower, Bonnie Wright, Ernie Hudson, Morgan Davies, James Marsters, Rick Cosnett, Stephen Hunter, Lincoln Lewis, John Jarratt, Neil Fanning
2026	Sydney	Sydney Showgrounds, Olympic Park	June, Friday 19th, Saturday 20th & Sunday 21st	Christopher Lloyd, Simon Pegg (Sunday only), Anthony Daniels, Karl Urban, Adam Savage, Adam Spencer, Danielle Panabaker, Holly Marie Combs, Brian Krause, Bolo Yeung (Sunday only), Mitchell Hope, Craig Parker, Alex Garfin, Michael Bishop, Donald Fullilove, Harry Waters Jr., Matt Doran, John Jarratt, Lincoln Lewis, Jed Brophy, Stephen Hunter, Bruce Hopkins, Veronica Taylor, Alan Lee, Neil Fanning
2026	Perth	Perth Convention & Exhibition Centre	June, Saturday 27th & Sunday 28th	Christopher Lloyd, Simon Pegg (Sunday only), Anthony Daniels, Adam Savage, Adam Spencer, Holly Marie Combs, Brian Krause, Mitchell Hope, Craig Parker, Alex Garfin, Michael Bishop, Donald Fullilove, Harry Waters Jr., Matt Doran, John Jarratt, Lincoln Lewis, Jed Brophy, Stephen Hunter, Bruce Hopkins, Veronica Taylor, Alan Lee, Neil Fanning
2026	Adelaide	Adelaide Showgrounds	October, Friday 30th, Saturday 31st November, Sunday 1st	Sean Astin, Christopher Lambert, Billy Boyd (Sunday only), Alan Tudyk, Sara Tomko, Anson Mount (Saturday only), Rena Owen, Kiran Shah, Mark Rolston, Jenette Goldstein, Daniel Kash, Cynthia Dale Scott, Carl Toop, Mitchell Hope, John Jarratt, Lincoln Lewis, Neil Fanning
2026	Brisbane	Brisbane Convention & Exhibition Centre	November, Friday 6th, Saturday 7th & Sunday 8th	Sean Astin, Christopher Lambert, Alan Tudyk, Sara Tomko, Anson Mount, Rena Owen, Kiran Shah, Mark Rolston, Jenette Goldstein, Daniel Kash, Matt Doran, Cynthia Dale Scott, Carl Toop, Mitchell Hope,

== Controversies and incidents ==
In June 2016, founder Daniel Zachariou shared on his Facebook page a petition calling for all transgender education to be stopped in schools, and claimed that the Safe Schools program forces children to "learn about sex, gender fluidity and transgenderism at ages as young as 5 without the supervision of parents". This led to outrage and criticism from many convention goers and personalities, and they called for a boycott of the convention. Zachariou later apologized in a post for sharing the petition, by saying "I want to express my sincere apologies to all staff, volunteers, guests and attendees of the Expo, and especially those who identify as LBGTQIA+". He further stated "in no way did I intend to express transphobic or homophobic views, which would not align with the values of acceptance and camaraderie that I hold and aim to demonstrate through Supanova".

At Supanova Sydney in June 2021, a stall in the artist hall was found to be selling items including rising sun flags, merchandise with swastikas, fascist and homophobic statements, and shirts proclaiming pride in a "Christian, heterosexual, pro-gun, conservative identity". Upon alerting staff Friday evening all products featuring Nazi and Rising Sun symbols were removed by Supanova staff prior to the convention opening to the public Saturday morning. The stallholders had been removed previously a number of years ago but had continued to exhibit annually as they had been given a 'second chance' by Supanova under threat of permanent removal. Despite this the stall continued to operate throughout Saturday however the stallholders were eventually evicted Sunday morning when fresh concerns surrounding their behavior on Saturday were raised. Supanova issued a statement stating that they "thoroughly investigated the matter with the assistance of the information provided by attendees overnight, and the exhibitor was subsequently removed from the event". However the slow response and lack of oversight by the organisers resulted in criticism from convention goers and the media, and led to renewed calls to boycott the convention. In response to the poor handling of the Sydney 2021 stall incident, Zachariou stepped down as Event Director in July 2021, though he still remains with the company.

On 18 April 2026, a man leaving the Melbourne convention was killed and another seriously injured after they were struck by a car that had been driven onto a footpath at the Melbourne Showgrounds. Event organisers held a minute's silence for the victims at the convention at noon the following day.

== See also ==
- Fandom
- List of multigenre conventions
- Oz Comic Con
