= Scooby-Doo and Scrappy-Doo (video game) =

1991 video game

- Developer: PAL Developments
- Publisher: HI-Tec
- Platforms: Amiga; Amstrad CPC; Atari ST; Commodore 64; ZX Spectrum
- Release: EU: 1991
- Genre: Platform
- Mode: Single-player

Scooby-Doo and Scrappy-Doo is a 1991 platform game developed by PAL Developments and published by Hi-Tec. It is part of the Scooby-Doo franchise, and was released in Europe for Amiga, Amstrad CPC, Atari ST, Commodore 64, and ZX Spectrum. The game received praise for its graphics.

== Gameplay ==
Scooby-Doo and Scrappy-Doo is a platform game in which the player takes control of Scrappy-Doo. When Shaggy and Scooby-Doo get lost while looking for food, Scrappy sets out to find them. Gameplay takes place across various levels, each with monster enemies that must be avoided by the player. Scooby Snacks can be collected to earn an extra life, while points can be earned through the collection of burgers.

The Amiga and Atari ST versions feature nine levels, including a cruise ship, an island of pirates, a snowy environment, and a forest. The Amstrad CPC, Commodore 64, and ZX Spectrum versions feature four levels, including a ghost town, a graveyard, a mansion, and a dungeon.

== Reception ==
Reception

Review scores
Publication	Score
Crash	90% (ZX Spectrum)
Computer and Video Games	88% (ZX Spectrum)
Sinclair User	74% (ZX Spectrum)
Your Sinclair	74/100 (ZX Spectrum)
Zzap!64	62% (C64)
Amiga Action	72% (Amiga)
Amiga Format	69% (Amiga)
Amiga Power	90% (Amiga)
Amstrad Computer User	88% (Amstrad CPC)
Games-X	4.5/5
Microhobby	70% (ZX Spectrum)
Zzap!	83%

Award
Publication	Award
Crash	Crash Smash

Scooby-Doo and Scrappy-Doo received praise for its graphics. Richard Leadbetter of Computer and Video Games wrote that the graphics "capture the knock-out atmosphere of the cartoon and there is a nice variation in the backgrounds and sprites." Amiga Action called the graphics "smooth and dazzlingly colourful". The magazine considered the game too easy and simple, but stated that it was, "Not bad for short term, relaxing fun." Zzap!64 wrote that the gameplay was simple enough to have particular appeal for younger players, while only "cynical, older players" would wonder "why there isn't more variety."

Games-X believed the game would appeal to both younger and older people, while Chris Jenkins of Sinclair User stated that it was best suited for younger people because of its lack of challenging gameplay. Your Sinclair stated that the game lacked originality and was repetitive, but also called it "a bit of a nice surprise," writing that it was the best cartoon-based tie-in from Hi-Tec to date. Crash praised the game and considered it addictive and entertaining, while Leadbetter considered it simple but "very entertaining."

Amiga Format called it "fun but disposable", and stated that the gameplay "has little basis in the cartoon reality from whence it came." The magazine also wrote that the game suffers from "some rather iffy collision detection, but as this works in your favour it doesn't harm the game." Stuart Campbell of Amiga Power described it as a "joyful and magnificently entertaining" game, and wrote that the levels become progressively "bigger and smarter, with enough exploration potential to keep you amused for weeks." Jenkins opined that an earlier Scooby-Doo game by Gargoyle Games was superior.
