= The Scooby-Doo Project =

1999 live-action/animated television special

- Title card
- Based on: Characters by; Joe Ruby; Ken Spears; The Blair Witch Project by; Daniel Myrick; Eduardo Sánchez
- Written by: Chris Kelly; Larry Morris; Steve Patrick
- Directed by: Chris Kelly; Larry Morris; Steve Patrick
- Starring: Scott Innes; Mary Kay Bergman; Frank Welker; B.J. Ward
- Country of origin: United States
- Original language: English

Production
- Producer: Ashley Nixon
- Running time: 17 minutes
- Production company: Cartoon Network Productions

Original release
- Network: Cartoon Network
- Release: October 31, 1999

The Scooby-Doo Project is a 1999 American live-action/animated found footage horror comedy television Halloween special satirising The Blair Witch Project and the Scooby-Doo franchise. It aired during Cartoon Network's Scooby-Doo, Where Are You! marathon on October 31, 1999, broadcast in small segments during commercial breaks, with the segments re-aired in their completed form, with an extended ending, at the end of the marathon. The special won an Annie Award.

== Development ==
In 1999, when three different Scooby-Doo marathons were scheduled for October, three Cartoon Network animators got assigned to create individual packaging and promotion for them. When the film The Blair Witch Project became a major success in August, it resulted in the three of them requesting if they were allowed to pool together their resources to make a satire of the cultural phenomenon. They put together a short proof of concept video consisting of the character Daphne running through the woods and the higher ups at the network approved the idea.

The script was written and produced to air in sketch form within intro and outro bumps across the programming stunt, with the whole content still making sense when compiled together after the fact. The budget given for original animation was limited, so the animators made sure to get all of the characters from the back as part of the package deal; a lot of lipflap was used several times over. The mockumentary-style suburban neighborhood interviews were filmed at one of the producer's mother and fathers' house and both of them appear in the final product. The forest scenes were filmed in the backyard of the home. They all drove up there after regular work hours to stage the tents, piles, and sticks. All live-action footage was shot on Mini-DV. There was also a set of scenes at a drive-in theater which was not included in the marathon. The car used for the Mystery Machine was on a promotional tour in Canada at the time, so a couple of the producers involved flew up and got that footage in a day. The press conference footage was filmed in a conference room by the cafeteria in the middle of a workday. The deputy in the background was played by a programming exec who had worked at several of Cartoon Network's major shows in the last 20 years, and several more from the company who were at the office that day did the voice acting for the press people shouting questions.

The voice cast of the Scooby Gang was recorded over the phone from Los Angeles, and was the same team that was making Scooby-Doo on Zombie Island at around the same time. The whole thing was put together at Turner Studios in Atlanta. The crew was somewhat stricken with panic; they noticed many other people started doing Blair Witch parodies for fall TV premieres on other networks, meaning they had beat them to air, but expressed relief when the press started crowning their special as one of the better ones when it finally premiered. Due to how well received the work was, it ended up being the excess over programming agreed to play the whole special strung together already at the end of the last night.

== Plot ==
Standing outside the Mystery Machine, Velma introduces each member of Mystery Inc. and explains that she is documenting one of their new mysteries.

The footage cuts to the gang's interviews with locals of Casper County, each describing the monster reported to be haunting the woods. The final interview presented is with an elderly woman who warns them not to enter the location. The gang arrives at the woods regardless, with Shaggy noting that the woods look "more realistic" than their own, cartoon woods. When they arrive at the cemetery inside of the woods, the place where the county's curse began, Shaggy is horrified to learn that they will be sleeping nearby. Velma proceeds to explain the curse, but is drowned out by Shaggy and Scooby.

Cutting to the next day, it is revealed that the gang has had an offscreen encounter with the monster in the woods. Velma remarks they have been walking forever to find whoever, or whatever, was trying to scare them. Daphne voices her belief that the monster is a farmer, possibly even the one they had interviewed earlier. That night, Velma wakes up to a sound outside the tent which also wakes Daphne. Velma asks if the noise is Scooby, only to hear Scrappy-Doo yell "Puppy power!" as a response. This sends the entire, panicked gang scrambling out of the tent, and into the woods. They eventually convince Scrappy to lead the way with investigating, then take the opportunity to flee without him. Later that night, the gang hears strange noises outside of the tent and exhort Shaggy and Scooby to investigate. The pair comply, and Scooby briefly gets separated after running away upon spotting a monster running across the gravestones.

Velma tries to interpret the map, but Daphne calls her out for failing to do so for the past two hours, and the gang's bond deteriorates as they begin to bicker and argue. It's revealed that Velma's map is a stereotypical cartoon map, made of nothing more than a vague dotted line and a large X at the location, which the others protest as being useless. They fail to retrace their steps and realize that they are walking in circles, and the map is lost after Shaggy and Scooby eat it, as the pair had inadvertently eaten all of their food on the first night.

The footage cuts to night, where a frantic Fred tells the gang that they have been trapped in the forest for a week, and have not unmasked a villain and says that he misses how they solved mysteries in only 22 minutes. They soon find more piles of Scooby Snacks and, despite Daphne insisting against it, Shaggy and Scooby taste them. Shaggy screams in terror, only for it to be revealed that it is due to the Scooby Snacks being stale.

A while later, Velma loses her glasses, to which Fred loses his patience, yelling at her to get a glasses strap. After the boys argue about constantly having to look for Velma's glasses, it is revealed that Velma has wandered off and that Daphne has gone to look for her. Daphne finds her and complains about her inability to take care of her appearance due to their days in the woods. Scrappy reappears, and Daphne flees blindly in a panic. When Velma tries to assure her that there is no monster, Daphne reveals that she is running specifically because of Scrappy.

The gang tracks the monster's noises to a haunted-looking house in the middle of the forest, and go inside to ask for help. Finding a radio, Velma decides to see if they are on the news and switches it on, only for "Seven Days a Week" to start playing. Shaggy exclaims in horror that they always get chased when music is playing, at which point the zombie appears and chases them upstairs. Reaching a hallway, Velma says she hates the part with the doors and stands to the side, filming as the monster chases the others back and forth, from door to door. The monster then pops up directly in front of Velma, chasing her down into the basement, where Shaggy is standing in a corner, facing the wall out of fright. Suddenly, the monster charges at Velma and the screen cuts to black.

== Extended ending ==
The gang has trapped the monster, who is tied to a chair. Fred unmasks him, revealing a random, live-action man. He calls them intrusive kids, which Shaggy points out should be "meddling". Velma questions the man's motive, to which he replies that the date is Halloween. Fred asks why, if that was the case, he had scared them the previous night in the cemetery, to which the man responds that he did not do so. Daphne wonders who it was that scared them then, and the real monster appears, screaming at them through an open window. They drop the camera and run, leaving the man tied to the chair. A struggle and running is heard as the camera cuts out.

It is revealed that the Mystery Machine was eventually discovered abandoned and search parties found hundreds of Scooby Snacks over several days, as well as the camera, though there was no sign of the gang themselves. A "Missing Persons" poster appears showing the entirety of Mystery Inc., suggesting that they disappeared following the monster's attack.

== Cast ==
- Scott Innes as Scooby-Doo, Shaggy Rogers, and Scrappy-Doo
- Frank Welker as Fred Jones
- B.J. Ward as Velma Dinkley
- Mary Kay Bergman as Daphne Blake

== Reception ==
Blair Witch co-director Myrick said that The Scooby Doo Project was one of his favorite parodies. A Vanity Fair author stated that the special reproduces the original film "so faithfully that there was no reason to see the dull original."

Film critic Kim Newman noted the special as being one of the few Blair Witch Project spoofs which were quite funny. Jonathan Barkan of Bloody Disgusting found the special "pretty damn funny" and "a wonderful meta recognition of how silly horror can sometimes be", he also added that it is a perfect horror story for children as they "can then learn to not take horror 100% seriously" from it. RVA Magazine's in contrast felt that its success came mostly due to it shifted boundaries for children's shows; "under the right [lack of] lighting, it was actually kind of scary". He also expressed that the animation and live-action meshed together better than one would have thought. Spencer Voyles of The Journal agreed, stating that it is a "strangely spooky episode that struck fear in the hearts of kids hoping to enjoy a day of classic cartoons". Chris Morgan of Paste magazine described the special as fascinating to look at out of an aesthetic point of view. Rusty Blazenhoff of Boing Boing called the special a gem of 1999.

=== Accolades ===
Year	Award	Category	Result	Ref.
2000	Annie Awards	Outstanding Animated Special Project	Won	

== Legacy ==
The original generic animation made for the special went on to be reused in projects long after its airing. Shots of Scooby-Doo got reused several times for Cartoon Campaign 2000 and Fred Jones footage featured prominently during the Cartoon Network halftime show of Big Game: Road Runner vs. Coyote the following year.

In the Big Game cartoon bumper, a "technical issue" leads to Fred and Moltar from Space Ghost Coast to Coast being heard during the "live airing", and it is revealed by Fred that he and the other members of Mystery Inc. escaped from the "monster" and eventually revealed it to be yet another "guy in a mask" whom they arrest. He also states that when they tried to inform people of these events, people ignored them and stated that their footage was "just another tired ripoff of The Blair Witch Project".

The success of the first special prompted Cartoon Network to make a sequel of sorts named Night of the Living Doo in 2001.

Because the special only aired once, it is sometimes included on lists of programs banned from TV, although it was common at the time to exclude specials from reruns.

The special has never officially been released on its own on home video but three DVD volumes of the "Best of CN On-Air" were produced for posterity which featured it.

On January 30th, 2020, a user named “Sover_” uploaded an unofficial 4K upscaling of the special to YouTube. This version includes the extended ending that was shown in the original completed broadcast.

An official version of the special was eventually uploaded to the Cartoon Network YouTube channel on October 29, 2022, as part of the network's 30th anniversary. In this version, the scenes with Scrappy-Doo and the extended ending were removed.

== See also ==
- List of Halloween television specials
