= KLID =

- Poplar Bluff, Missouri; United States
- Frequency: 1340 kHz

Programming
- Format: Oldies and talk radio

Ownership
- Owner: Browning Skidmore Broadcasting, Inc.

History
- First air date: 1961
- Call sign meaning: Don Lidenton

Technical information
- Licensing authority: FCC
- Facility ID: 7336
- Class: C
- Power: 1,000 watts
- Transmitter coordinates: 36°46′04″N 90°22′23″W

Links
- Public license information: Public file; LMS
- Webcast: Listen live
- Website: klidradio.com

KLID is an American radio station licensed to Poplar Bluff, Missouri, broadcasting on 1340 AM. The station airs a format consisting of talk and sports. It is owned by Browning Skidmore Broadcasting, Inc. KLID is the "Voice of NASCAR" in Poplar Bluff and has been the Voice of the Poplar Bluff Mules for 55 consecutive years.

KLID was founded and named for broadcaster and broadcast engineer Don Lidenton. KLID former DJs include Scott Innes who was the voice of Scooby-Doo.
