= Scrappy-Doo =

Fictional dog

- Scooby-Doo character
- First appearance: "The Scarab Lives!" (Scooby-Doo and Scrappy-Doo; 1979)
- Created by: Joseph Barbera
- Voiced by: Lennie Weinrib (1979–1980); Don Messick (1980–1988); Scott Innes (1999–present); J. P. Manoux (2002; Scrappy Rex in the live-action film); James Arnold Taylor (2007; Drawn Together); Dan Milano (2007; Robot Chicken); Tom Kenny (2019; Wacky Races); Jason Mantzoukas (2024; Velma); C. H. Greenblatt (2025; Jellystone!)
- Portrayed by: Rowan Atkinson (2002; disguised as Emile Mondavarious)

In-universe information
- Full name: Scrappy Cornelius Doo (first live-action theatrical film)
- Alias: Emile Mondavarious (disguise)
- Species: Canis lupus familiaris
- Gender: Male
- Breed: Great Dane

Scrappy-Doo is a fictional character in the Scooby-Doo franchise. A Great Dane puppy and the nephew of the titular character, he was created by Hanna-Barbera Productions in 1979 and appeared in various incarnations of the franchise. Lennie Weinrib provided his voice for one season in 1979, and from 1980 on it was performed by Don Messick (who also voiced Scooby). In the first live-action theatrical film, video games and commercials, he was voiced by Scott Innes (with some additional performance by Rowan Atkinson).

He was created to save the series' ratings, which by 1979 had begun to sink to the point of cancellation threats from ABC, who considered choosing between Scooby-Doo and an unnamed pilot from Ruby-Spears Enterprises which Mark Evanier had also written.

== History ==
=== Hanna-Barbera ===
==== Precursors ====
Though Scrappy officially debuted in the fall of 1979, there may have been hints of his existence in 1969, as he "...bore a resemblance to Spears's and Ruby's initial idea for a feisty little dog", which was one of the early ideas for the Scooby-Doo character himself, along with the "big cowardly dog" ultimately chosen.

After hearing Joe Barbera's description of the character, writer Mark Evanier was significantly reminded of Henery Hawk from the Looney Tunes franchise and incorporated what he knew of said character into the script.

==== Development ====
Scrappy's creation officially began in 1978, when Scooby-Doo's ratings were sinking to the point of cancellation threats from ABC.

Duane Poole, a story editor for the first series in which Scrappy appeared, recalled it as a lively time, with many new ideas and some new blood being hired with the desperation to revive Scooby-Doo, which had been a cash-cow in its glory days.

Mel Blanc was the first choice to voice Scrappy, given his connection to Henery Hawk, but he demanded more money to voice the part. Frank Welker, the voice of Fred Jones, auditioned to voice Scrappy as a dual role during the character's development (one of several voice actors considered for the role) and coined the catchphrase "Scrappy Dappy Doo" & "Puppy Power" during his audition. He would later change this to "Monkey Muscle" for the similar Donkey Kong Jr. character he would voice for TV's Saturday Supercade. The next choice was Messick, who was seen as giving the best audition, but still deemed "the wrong voice". Afterwards, other well-known cartoon voice artists were considered or suggested: Daws Butler, Paul Winchell, Marilyn Schreffler, Howard Morris, Dick Beals and Marshall Efron. Ultimately, Lennie Weinrib was chosen.

=== Warner Bros. ===
==== Live-action Scooby-Doo movie (2002) ====
Scrappy was first included in an early draft of what would become Scooby-Doo (2002) in around March 2000—though he did not physically appear, was only mentioned offhand by Shaggy and Scooby and was heavily implied to have been put to sleep for undisclosed reasons. James Gunn first acknowledged his involvement in April 2000. Other original ideas for the villain included the Old Man Smithers, the villain from the film's prologue. Concept art for Scrappy turning into a monster was drawn in 2001. According to the DVD commentary, choosing the villain of the film was a problematic part of the production, as the makers did not feel comfortable simply giving the role to an "anonymous monster" and that the ending was in "bits and pieces" and the "confinements forced them to be creative". "There is a Scrappy because he exists in the cartoon, so we have to acknowledge him", Gunn stated in an interview shortly before the film's release.

Ultimately, in the final film, Scrappy is revealed to be its main antagonist and had been plotting to take revenge on Mystery Inc. for abandoning him prior to the film's events. Despite previously stating that he felt that "kids didn't care", Gunn later admitted with some dismay that younger viewers had reacted poorly to the development, admitting he had not understood how popular Scrappy was with younger viewers. "I still think it was funny that Scrappy was the villain", he explained in an interview with Cinefantastique, "but there are kids out there who were really upset."

== Performers ==
- Lennie Weinrib (1979–1980; Scooby-Doo and Scrappy-Doo)
- Don Messick (1980–1988; Scooby-Doo and Scrappy-Doo, The New Scooby and Scrappy-Doo Show, Strong Kids, Safe Kids, The 13 Ghosts of Scooby-Doo, Scooby-Doo Meets the Boo Brothers, Scooby-Doo and the Ghoul School, Scooby-Doo and the Reluctant Werewolf)
- Scott Innes (1999–present; The Scooby-Doo Project, Harvey Birdman, Attorney at Law, Scooby-Doo, video games, commercials, toys, various merchandise)
- J.P. Manoux (2002; Scrappy Rex in the live-action film)
- James Arnold Taylor (2007; Drawn Together)
- Dan Milano (2007; Robot Chicken)
- Tom Kenny (2019; Wacky Races)
- Jason Mantzoukas (2024; Velma)
- C. H. Greenblatt (2025; Jellystone!)

== Reception ==
Scrappy was initially seen as a "good idea" by Saturday Morning Review. Viewership seemed to react positively to Scrappy, as Scooby's ratings went up with Scrappy's arrival. The character continued to be a success for the next decade. Story editor Duane Poole noted that "Scrappy solved a lot of story problems. Before you had to get Shaggy and Scooby into dangerous situations—and there was no real easy way to get them there—with Scrappy, he, uh, picked them up and carried them there. He just charged in. He was just such the antithesis of what Scooby and Shaggy were. The dynamic was great fun to play."

Joe Ruby and Ken Spears seemed to have a less-than-positive view of the character. The co-founder of Ruby-Spears enterprises said, "Everyone was upset", though was unclear about whether this concerned business reasons (they had started their own company two years earlier) or personal creative reasons (considering that if Scooby had been canceled, then the last slot would have hit their show instead), starting when, in 1979, it appeared that a pilot of theirs would be renewed over Scooby's. Mark Evanier, who wrote said pilot, was hired impromptu to write Scrappy-Doo into a new pilot to renew interest in Scooby. As a result, Scooby was renewed over theirs, which was upsetting for them. "Scrappy would charge in and solve things, so he was useful, in that way. A lot of people made derogatory comments about it at the studio and you know you don't want to be saddled with something based on, you know, network [...] but I think I liked working with it most of those cartoons," said Charles M. Howell, a writer who originally joined the franchise back on The New Scooby and Scrappy-Doo Show and continued to work on various iterations of the show until finally ending his tenure in the late 1980s after penning the pilot episode for A Pup Named Scooby-Doo.

Tom Ruegger stated: "It's a lot easier to love Scooby than it is to love Scrappy. But I don't have the problem with Scrappy that I have heard expressed by others. I suspect this is because I wasn't watching Scooby from the beginning, but rather, I came in and started catching up quite a while (a couple of years) after Scrappy had made his debut. Hey, they'd been messing with Scooby's cast for years! Scooby Dum. All those nasty celebrity cameo Scooby movies. I dislike those things more than I dislike Scrappy. And, for what it's worth, at least Scrappy brings some energy to the table. He actually does have a personality, even though many find it obnoxious. [...] So, since I tend to love the characters with whom I work, I can say that I learned to love Scrappy, despite all his limitations." Casper Kelly, one of the writers of The Scooby-Doo Project also admitted to having Scrappy as being in his first memory of Scooby, as well as enjoying when the monsters were real over the traditional fake monster format.

In 1999, celebrating Scooby-Doo's thirtieth anniversary, several newspapers printed articles, some of which mentioned Scrappy. In an episode of the 2011 series Scooby-Doo! Mystery Incorporated, Scrappy appeared in a brief cameo when Fred and Daphne visited a museum celebrating their exploits, to which Fred claimed "we all promised each other that we would never speak of him". In 2020, Casper Kelly stated that many writers did not actually hate Scrappy, implying that it was a joke and mandate.

== Appearances ==
=== Television series ===
- Scooby-Doo and Scrappy-Doo (1979–1980)
- The Richie Rich/Scooby-Doo Show (1980–1982)
- The Scooby & Scrappy-Doo/Puppy Hour (1982–1983)
- The New Scooby and Scrappy-Doo Show / The New Scooby-Doo Mysteries (1983–1984)
- Scary Scooby Funnies (package show) (1984–1985)
- The 13 Ghosts of Scooby-Doo (1985)
- Scooby's Mystery Funhouse (package show) (1985–1986)
- Scooby-Doo! Mystery Incorporated (2011) (cameo)
- Wacky Races (2019) (cameo)
- Velma (2024)
- Jellystone! (2025)

=== Films ===
- Scooby-Doo Meets the Boo Brothers (1987)
- Scooby-Doo and the Ghoul School (1988)
- Scooby-Doo! and the Reluctant Werewolf (1988)
- Scooby-Doo (2002)
- Scooby-Doo! and the Goblin King (2008) ("Easter egg" cameo)

=== Other appearances ===
==== Tabletop games ====
- Scooby-Doo Game (1980)
- Scooby-Doo and Scrappy-Doo Game (1983)
- Scooby-Doo: The Board Game (Deluxe Edition) (2021)

==== Books ====
- Scrappy co-starred in several of Horace Elias's tie-in novels, particularly Scooby-Doo In the Haunted House (1980).
- Scooby-Doo, the 1995 Archie Comics series.
- He was the star of the 24th issue of the Cartoon Network Presents comic book series.
- Scrappy appears in the 2016 DC Comics comic book series Scooby Apocalypse.

==== Other television ====
- At midnight, of October 31, 1999, Cartoon Network aired several promos over the gang's disappearance. One was a promo involving the gang being frightened of Scrappy. In an interview, the writers mention adding that bit because Scrappy's part in the marathon was coming up and they felt the need to work him in.
- Around 2001, Cartoon Network aired a bumper titled "Scrappy Loses It" in which Scrappy rants about how the newer Cartoon Cartoons were becoming more popular than him despite him being around longer as the Cartoon Cartoons enter the studio in the same order that their schedule aired on prime-time. The bumper ends with Scrappy saying "Not for me, not for me, man!" in reference to Cartoon Network's then-current slogan, "The Best Place for Cartoons".
- Scrappy made a quick "Easter Egg" appearance in the "Scoobynatural" episode of the TV series Supernatural.
- Scrappy appeared in one of the bloopers for the 2003 movie Scooby-Doo! and the Monster of Mexico.
- Scrappy was mentioned in the 2019 movie Scooby-Doo! and the Curse of the 13th Ghost.
- Scrappy was mentioned in the 2021 TV special Scooby-Doo, Where Are You Now!

==== Video games ====
- In 1991, Amiga released a game titled Scooby-Doo and Scrappy-Doo in which Scrappy was the main playable character and had to venture through various platforms to find Shaggy and Scooby, who had gone missing.
- In 1999, Cartoon Network released Scrappy Stinks, a game in which the sole objective was to pelt Scrappy with a substance referred to as "smelly goo", but avoid hitting Shaggy and Scooby in the process.
