= Scooby-Doo (film) =

2002 film directed by Raja Gosnell

- Theatrical release poster
- Directed by: Raja Gosnell
- Screenplay by: James Gunn
- Story by: Craig Titley; James Gunn
- Based on: Characters by Hanna-Barbera Productions
- Produced by: Charles Roven; Richard Suckle
- Starring: Freddie Prinze Jr.; Sarah Michelle Gellar; Matthew Lillard; Linda Cardellini; Rowan Atkinson
- Cinematography: David Eggby
- Edited by: Kent Beyda
- Music by: David Newman
- Production companies: Atlas Entertainment; Mosaic Media Group
- Distributed by: Warner Bros. Pictures
- Release date: June 14, 2002
- Running time: 86 minutes
- Country: United States
- Language: English
- Budget: $84 million
- Box office: $275 million

Scooby-Doo (also known as Scooby-Doo: The Movie) is a 2002 American mystery comedy horror film, based on the long-running animated franchise. The first installment in the Scooby-Doo live-action film series, the film was directed by Raja Gosnell and written by James Gunn. It features an ensemble cast consisting of Freddie Prinze Jr., Sarah Michelle Gellar, Matthew Lillard, Linda Cardellini, and Rowan Atkinson, with Neil Fanning providing the voice of the titular character. The plot revolves around Mystery, Inc., a group of young adult sleuths and their talking Great Dane who solves mysteries. They reunite after a two-year disbandment to solve a mystery involving a series of paranormal events at a horror-themed tropical island resort.

Filming took place in and around Queensland, Australia, on a budget of $84 million. Reggae artist Shaggy and punk rock band MxPx performed different versions of the Scooby-Doo, Where Are You! theme song for the film.

Scooby-Doo was released in the United States on June 14, 2002 by Warner Bros. Pictures. It was a commercial success, grossing $275 million on an $84 million budget. The film received generally negative reviews from critics. The Scooby-Doo Spooky Coaster, a ride based on the film, was built at Warner Bros. Movie World on the Gold Coast, Queensland that same year. A sequel, Scooby-Doo 2: Monsters Unleashed, was released in 2004. Both films later gained a cult following.

== Plot ==
After Mystery, Inc. solve their latest mystery and unmask a would-be criminal known as "The Luna Ghost", long-brewing tensions erupt between Fred Jones, who has become a self-obsessed glory hog, Daphne Blake, who is tired of being the damsel in distress, and Velma Dinkley, who resents Fred for always taking credit for her plans. Subsequently, they disband, abandoning a broken-hearted Shaggy Rogers and Scooby-Doo.

Two years later, Mystery Inc. are each separately invited to a horror-themed tropical resort called "Spooky Island", at the behest of its owner Emile Mondavarious, who believes the guests are falling under a demonic curse. While Shaggy and Scooby hope that this will bring the gang back together, Fred, Daphne, and Velma each intend to solve the mystery on their own. At a ritualistic performance given by actor N'Goo Tuana and his henchman, famous luchador Zarkos, N'Goo claims that ancient demons once ruled the island and that the resort has disturbed their sacred ground. Meanwhile, Shaggy falls for a girl named Mary Jane, who is allergic to dogs, distancing himself from Scooby in the process. Scooby encounters the island's demons and attempts to warn Shaggy, but is not believed.

The gang each end up at the resort's abandoned haunted house ride and decide to cooperate for the time being. As the gang is exploring, the ride is activated, putting the gang in danger. Fred and Velma manage to break into the control room and shut off the ride, where they also discover an educational film about human culture. Meanwhile, Daphne finds a pyramid-shaped artifact called the "Daemon Ritus". Zarkos and his minions arrive, but the gang manages to escape.

Later, at the resort's hotel, the demons launch an attack. Scooby, Shaggy, Daphne, and Mary Jane manage to escape, but Fred, Velma and Mondavarious are kidnapped. The next day, the damage from the night before has been repaired and the resort guests act as if nothing happened. Scooby and Shaggy find Fred and realize that he has been possessed, along with the rest of the resort guests, leading to a harrowing motortricycle chase in which Scooby sees that Mary Jane is also possessed. Daphne is chased by a possessed Velma and is then caught by Zarkos. He takes back the Daemon Ritus and Daphne is possessed.

After they escape, Scooby tries to tell Shaggy about Mary Jane's possession, causing a falling-out in which Scooby goes missing. Shaggy searches for his friend, and discovers the demons' underground base of operations, as well as a vat of protoplasm containing the souls of those possessed by the demons. Shaggy frees the souls of Fred, Daphne, and Velma, who discover that sunlight is fatal to the demons.

A local voodoo priest informs the gang that the demons are planning to sacrifice a pure soul with the Daemon Ritus as part of a ritual known as "The Dark-pocalypse", which will result in them ruling the world for the next 10,000 years. The gang realizes that the pure soul is Scooby's and that Mondavarious invited them in order to use Scooby for the ritual. Fred, Daphne, and Velma put aside their differences and make a plan to save Scooby and the world.

Shaggy infiltrates the ritual, where he and Scooby reconcile. Fred and Velma unmask Mondavarious, revealing that he is actually a robot controlled by Scooby's estranged nephew Scrappy-Doo, who has been plotting his revenge against Mystery Inc. for abandoning him years ago, due to his power-hungry and egomaniacal nature. Using the power of the Daemon Ritus, Scrappy transforms into a giant monster and tries to kill the gang.

Meanwhile, Daphne fights Zarkos and knocks him into the vat, tipping it over and returning most of the other souls to their bodies. Daphne then reflects sunlight through a disco ball the gang had set up earlier, vanquishing the released demons. Shaggy removes the Daemon Ritus from Scrappy's chest, freeing the rest of the souls and reversing his transformation. During the subsequent celebration, Shaggy and a freed Mary Jane reunite along with Scooby, while Fred and Daphne share a kiss. Shaggy also finds the real Mondavarious, who had been trapped by Scrappy. Scrappy and his henchmen are arrested and Mystery, Inc., inspired by the experience, reunites for good.

== Cast ==
- Freddie Prinze Jr. as Fred Jones
- Sarah Michelle Gellar as Daphne Blake
- Matthew Lillard as Shaggy Rogers
- Linda Cardellini as Velma Dinkley
- Rowan Atkinson as Emile Mondavarious
- Isla Fisher as Mary Jane
- Miguel A. Núñez Jr. as a voodoo priest who is the last living native of Spooky Island

Neil Fanning voices Scooby-Doo. Scott Innes reprises his role as the voice of Scrappy-Doo, with J. P. Manoux providing the voice of the monstrous form he enters using the power of the Daemon Ritus (credited as "Scrappy Rex"). Sam Greco portrays Zarkos; Steven Grives portrays N'Goo Tuana; Kristian Schmid portrays Brad; and Michala Banas portrays Carol.

Additionally, Holly Brisley appears in a training video, while Frank Welker and Jess Harnell provide the vocal effects of Spooky Island's resident demons. Sugar Ray, Pamela Anderson and Nicholas Hope (Old Man Smithers) appear in cameo roles.

== Production ==
=== Development ===
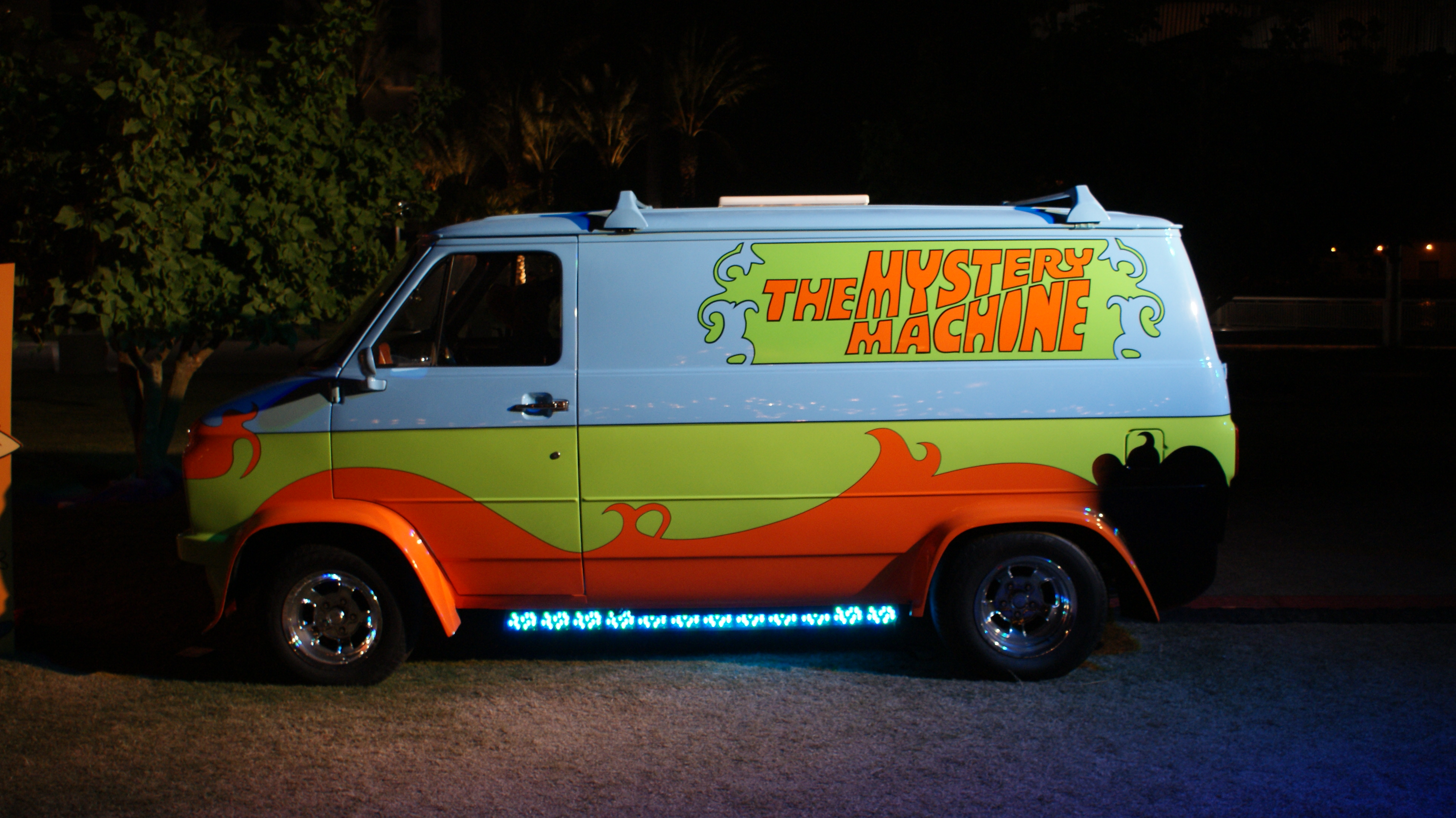
The Mystery Machine from the film at San Diego Comic-Con in 2013

Producer Charles Roven began developing a live-action treatment of Scooby-Doo in 1994 for Atlas Entertainment and Turner Pictures. By the end of the decade, the combined popularity of Scooby-Doo, Where Are You!, along with the addition of the script and updated digital animation, led Warner Bros. to fast track production of the film. In 1996, Kevin Smith was offered to write a script for the film, but would only accept if his producer Scott Mosier agreed to write with him. Writer Craig Titley wrote the original screenplay. His was an origin story, focusing on how the gang met in college and teamed up for the first time to find a hidden treasure. Titley's script included multiple references to the original series, including the use of the Kingston Mansion from the intro as a major setting, but his draft was ultimately unused after Titley was unavailable to perform rewrites. However, many elements from Titley's draft were incorporated into the final film, including a demonic cult creating monsters, Shaggy getting a girlfriend who creates tension between him and Scooby, and the use of profanity and adult humor. Mike Myers was reported to be co-writing the screenplay with Jay Kogan in July 1998, and was later on board to play Shaggy as well. In October 2000, the film was officially given the green light. Variety reported that Raja Gosnell had been hired to direct the film.

Production was started on February 12, 2001, at the Warner Bros. Movie World theme park, with over 400 cast and crew also taking over Tangalooma Island Resort for six weeks to film all the scenes set on Spooky Island. The film was originally set to have a much darker tone, essentially poking fun at the original series, much like The Brady Bunch Movie, and was set for a PG-13 rating. Shaggy was set to be a stoner, and there were many marijuana references.

Several rumors about these aspects in the original cartoon series were passed around by fans of the original and were to be incorporated into the live-action film.

According to Sarah Michelle Gellar, after the cast had signed on there was a change, and the film became more family-friendly, though some of the original adult jokes from credited screenwriter James Gunn are still in the film. They are also included in deleted scenes on the home media releases. Gellar said her character and Linda Cardellini's shared an onscreen kiss that did not make the final film. "It wasn't just, like, for fun," she said, explaining it took place in the body-switching scene. "Initially in the soul-swapping scene, Velma and Daphne couldn't seem to get their souls back together in the woods. And so the way they found was to kiss, and the souls went back into proper alignment."

The film was originally planned to have an anonymous, nameless, otherworldly monster mastermind as the main antagonist. Gunn and the production team had problems choosing the villain of the film, since they did not feel comfortable with the idea of giving the role to an "anonymous monster", and much of the film had been shot with this ending in mind. Another ending was filmed with Old Man Smithers revealed as the antagonist. The team decided to make Scrappy-Doo the antagonist, as Gunn disliked the character.

In 2017, the 15th anniversary of the release of the film, Gunn revealed in a Facebook post that there was an R-rated cut of Scooby-Doo and that CGI was used to remove cleavage of the female cast members.

=== Casting ===
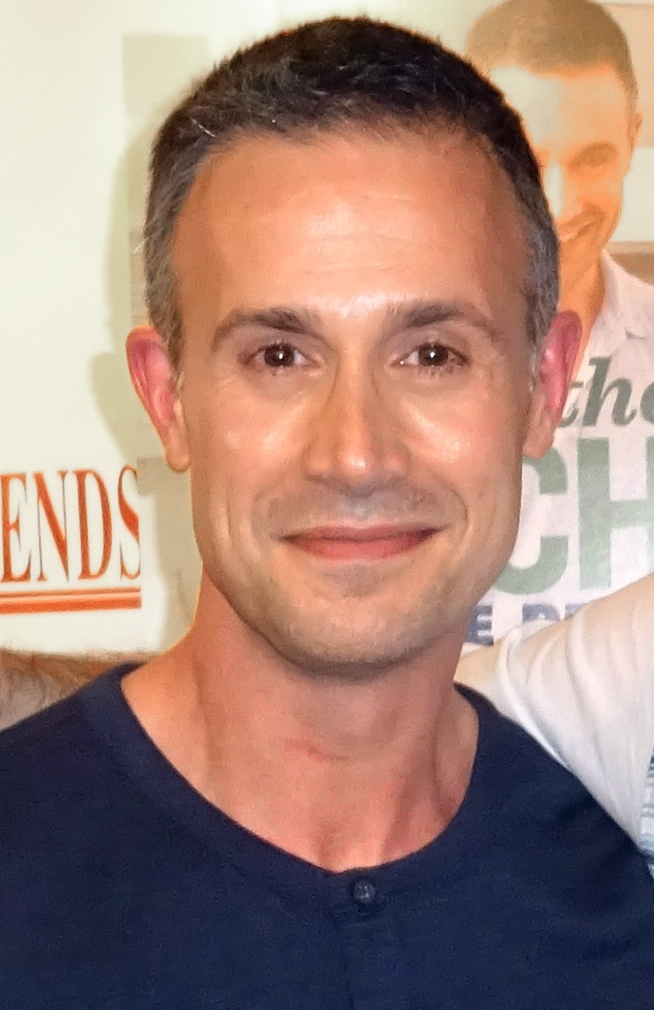
Freddie Prinze Jr.
(Fred Jones)

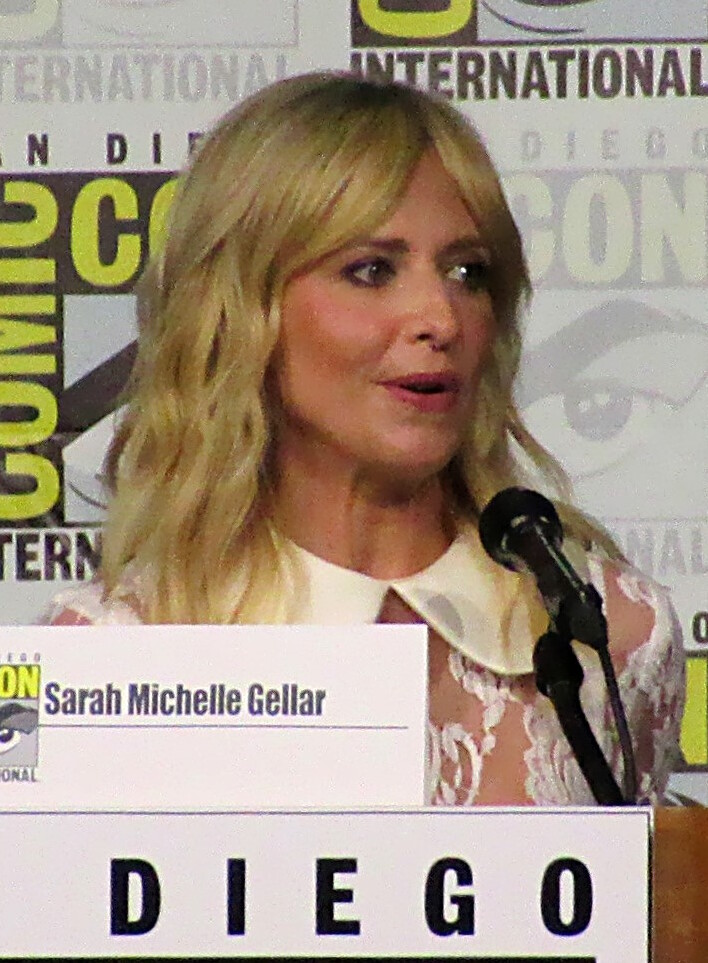
Sarah Michelle Gellar
(Daphne Blake)

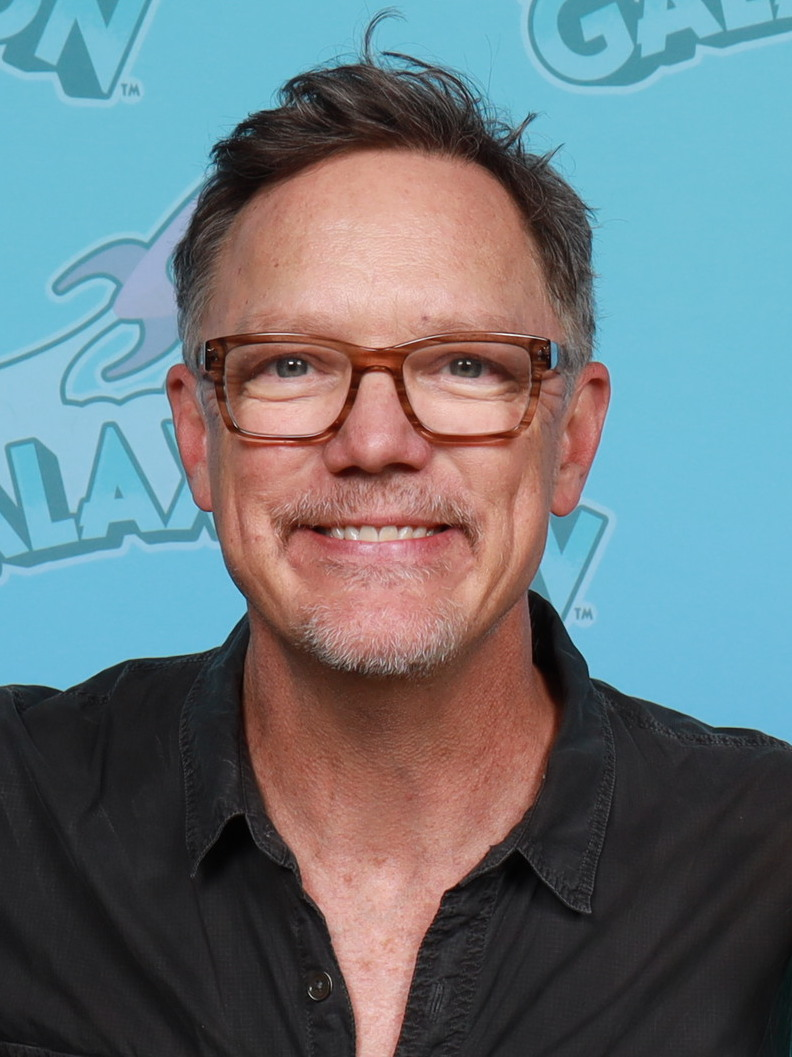
Matthew Lillard
(Norville "Shaggy" Rogers)

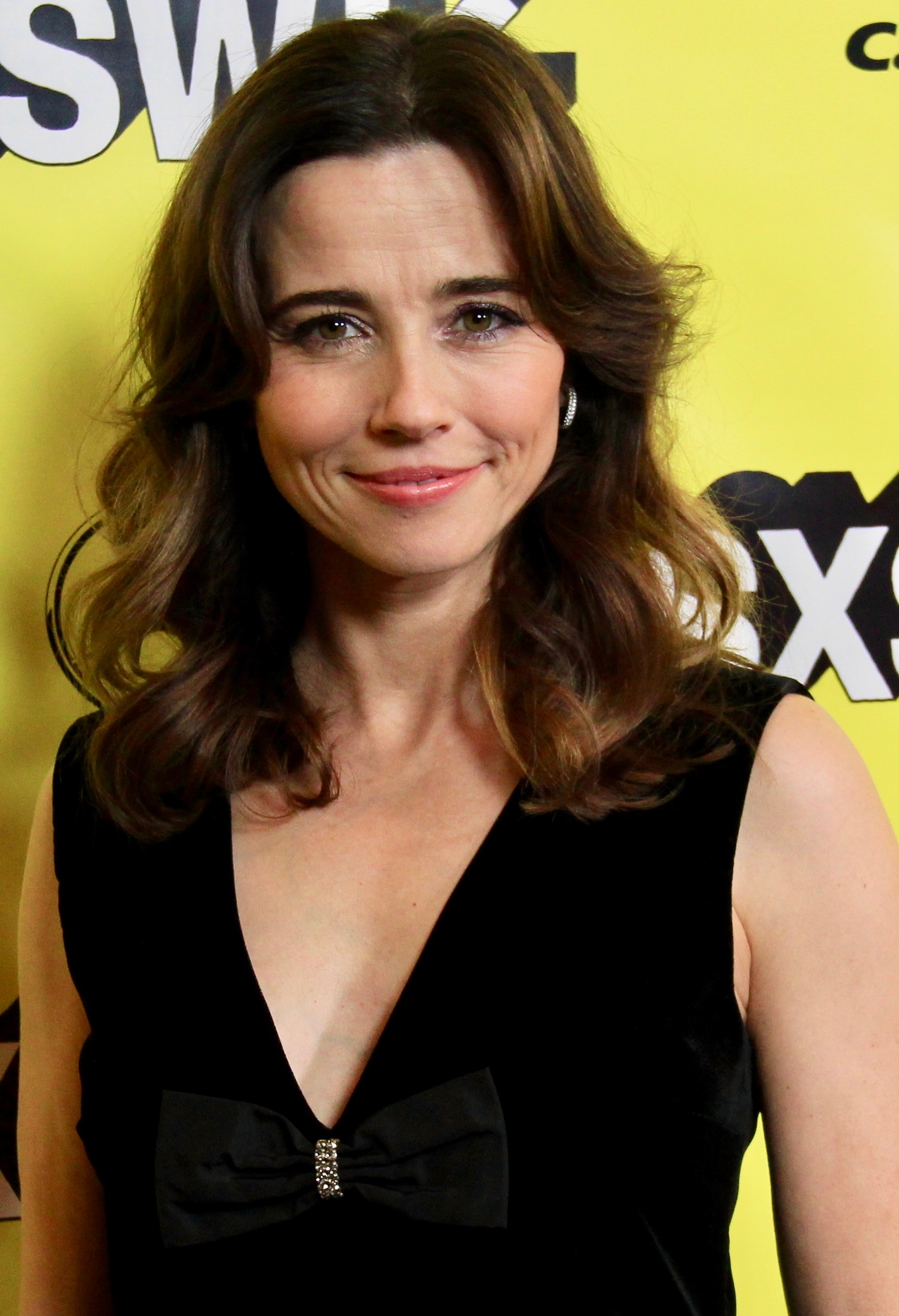
Linda Cardellini
(Velma Dinkley)

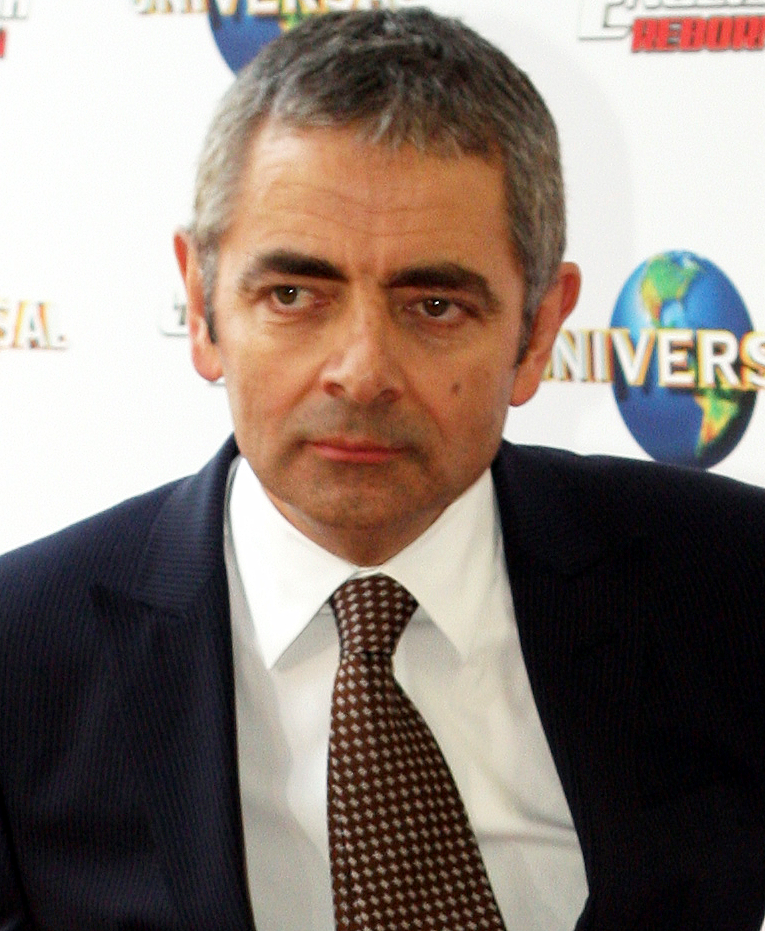
Rowan Atkinson
(Emile Mondavarious)

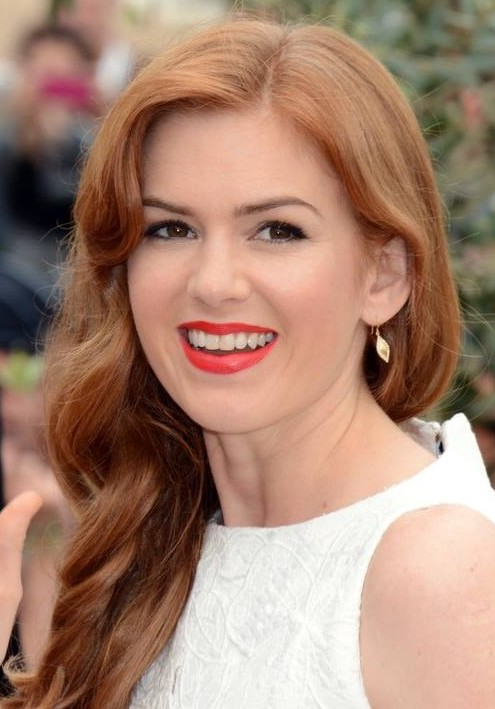
Isla Fisher
(Mary Jane)

Actors Freddie Prinze Jr. and Sarah Michelle Gellar, who both previously worked together in I Know What You Did Last Summer (1997) and portray Fred and Daphne, are romantically involved in both the film and reality. This film marks the first time in the franchise's history where the characters are portrayed as a couple. The pair married shortly after the film was released. Prinze said of his character, "[He] always showed more arrogance than everyone else. So in the movie, I took the opportunity to make him as narcissistic and self-loving as possible."

Jim Carrey was originally attached to play Shaggy, while Mike Myers also expressed interest in the role. Lochlyn Munro also auditioned for the role. The role was eventually given to Matthew Lillard. When asked about watching several cartoons before playing Shaggy, Lillard responded, "Everything I could get my hands on. If I ever have to see another episode of Scooby-Doo, it will be way too soon." Lillard would continue voicing Shaggy in the rest of the Scooby-Doo media starting in 2010, at the request of the character's original voice actor Casey Kasem, who had stepped down due to health issues; he would also poke fun at this appearance in the following year's Looney Tunes: Back in Action, where an animated Shaggy and Scooby voice their grievances over Lillard's portrayal during a lunch in the Warner Bros. studio cafeteria and threaten him to portray the character better in the sequel. Hadley Kay was selected by William Hanna to provide the voice of Scooby-Doo, but was later fired. Scott Innes was also going to voice Scooby in the film, but was replaced with Neil Fanning, an actor and stuntman who was performing in Warner Bros. Movie World's Police Academy Stunt Show at the time. Innes provided the voice of Scrappy, and also ad-libbed the character's dialogue for the ending scene when he is arrested.

On January 30, 2001, it was announced that Rowan Atkinson was in talks to play the role of the villain Emile Mondavarious in the film. Isla Fisher, who played Mary Jane, grew up watching Scooby-Doo in Australia, and said that the "best part of making this movie was being part of an institution, something that has been in people's childhoods and is something that means a lot to a lot of people." Linda Cardellini, who played Velma, was also a fan of the Scooby-Doo series.

=== Filming ===
Principal photography began on February 13, 2001. Filming took place throughout Queensland, Australia. Spooky Island was filmed on Tangalooma Island resort in Moreton Island. A life-sized puppet of Scooby was built by Jim Henson's Creature Shop, but was dropped in favor of animating the character entirely in computer-generated imagery. In March 2001, one month into filming, the first official cast picture was released.

== Music ==
=== Soundtrack ===
The film's score was composed by David Newman, who previously worked with Raja Gosnell on Never Been Kissed (1999) and scored films based on Hanna-Barbera productions including The Flintstones (1994) and its prequel Viva Rock Vegas (2000). A soundtrack was released on June 4, 2002, by Atlantic Records. It peaked at number 24 on the Billboard 200 and 49 on the Top R&B/Hip-Hop Albums.

== Release ==
=== Marketing ===
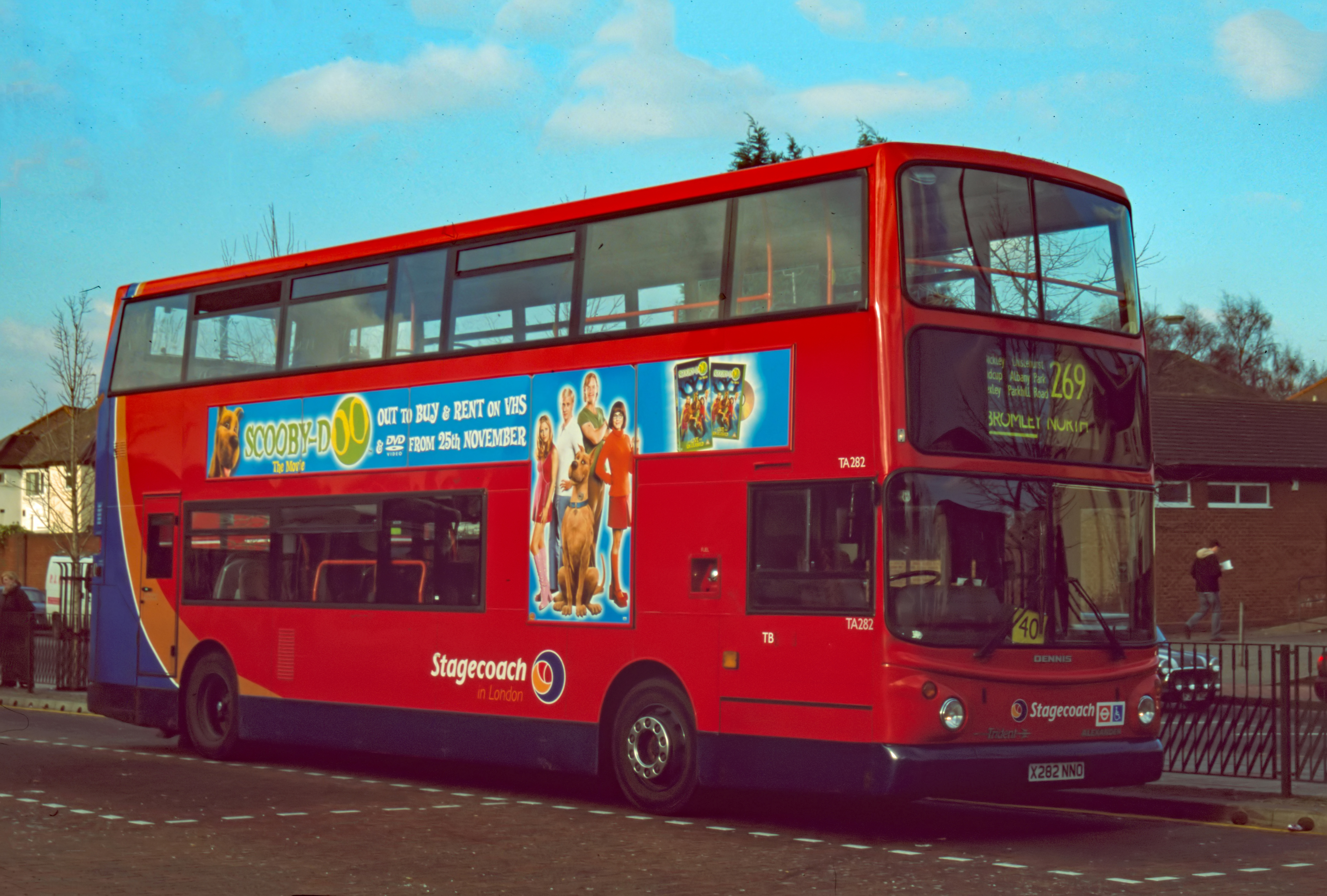
A bus advertising the film in London

On November 16, 2001, the first trailer of Scooby-Doo was released in theaters with the opening of Harry Potter and the Sorcerer's Stone. A second trailer debuted with the release of Ice Age and Showtime on March 15, 2002.

A video game based upon the film was released for Game Boy Advance shortly before the film was released. The game is played in third-person point of view and has multiple puzzle games and mini-games. The game's structure was similar to a board game. Metacritic rated it 64/100 based on five reviews, which they labeled as "mixed or average reviews". Meanwhile, Dairy Queen began promoting the film with kids meal toys, frozen cakes and a limited edition Mystery Crunch Blizzard flavor.

=== Home media ===
The film was released on VHS and DVD on October 11, 2002. The release included deleted scenes, among them an alternate opening animated in the style of the original television series, done by Kurtz & Friends. It was later released on Blu-ray on January 16, 2007. Said Blu-ray was given a double feature pack with its sequel, Monsters Unleashed, on November 9, 2010.

== Reception ==
=== Box office ===
Scooby-Doo debuted with $19.2 million on its opening day and $54.1 million over the weekend from 3,447 theaters, averaging about $15,711 per venue and ranking No. 1 at the box office above The Bourne Identity. At the time, it had the second-highest June opening weekend, behind Austin Powers: The Spy Who Shagged Me. During its theatrical run, Scooby-Doo also competed against another family-oriented film, Lilo & Stitch. The film closed on October 31, 2002, with a final gross of $153 million in the United States and Canada. It made an additional $122 million in other territories, bringing the total worldwide gross to $275.7 million, making it the fifteenth most successful film worldwide of 2002. The film was released in the United Kingdom on July 12, 2002, and topped the country's box office for the next two weekends, before being dethroned by Austin Powers in Goldmember.

=== Critical response ===
Scooby Doo received mostly negative reviews upon release. On review aggregator Rotten Tomatoes, the film has an approval rating of 32% based on 147 reviews, with an average rating of 4.6/10. The site's critical consensus reads: "Though Lillard is uncannily spot-on as Shaggy, Scooby Doo is a tired live-action update, filled with lame jokes." On Metacritic, the film received a weighted average score of 35 out of 100 based on 31 critics, indicating "generally unfavorable reviews". Audiences polled by CinemaScore gave the film an average grade of "B+" on an A+ to F scale.

Roger Ebert of the Chicago Sun-Times gave the film one out of four stars, stating that it "exists in a closed universe, and the rest of us are aliens. The Internet was invented so that you can find someone else's review of Scooby-Doo. Start surfing." Peter Travers of Rolling Stone said, "Get out your pooper-scoopers. Doo happens June 14th, warn the ads for Scooby-Doo. And they say there's no truth in Hollywood." Chris Hewitt of Empire gave the film two out of five stars.

Robin Rauzi of the Los Angeles Times called the film "entertainment more disposable than Hanna-Barbera's half-hour cartoons ever were." Although Jay Boyar of the Orlando Sentinel said that children who liked the animated version of Scooby-Doo will "probably like" the film, he urged parents to "know that the violence is a bit harder-edged than in the cartoon version". He said that adults who remember the cartoon version "may get caught up in what Scooby would call the 'rostalgia'", but "adults who do not fondly recall the Scooby-Doo cartoons are strongly advised to steer clear." Robert K. Elder of the Chicago Tribune gave the film 2 and 1/2 stars out of 4 and wrote, "Screenwriter James Gunn gets it mostly right, remaining fiercely faithful to Mystery Inc. mythology, from integrating Scooby's annoying nephew Scrappy-Doo to Velma's penchant for yelling 'jinkees!' Unlike the lead balloon adaptation 'Josie and the Pussycats,' Scooby-Doo knows when to take itself seriously and when to laugh at itself -- even if its audience isn't laughing along at every gag." James Gunn had previously stated that he felt that "kids [would]n't care" about the film's adult humor, but later admitted that he had not understood Scrappy-Doo's popularity with younger viewers, who had reacted poorly to the development of Scrappy as a villain.

Conversely, Hank Struever of The Washington Post gave the film a positive review, stating that "You don't want to love this, but you will. Although Scooby-Doo falls far short of becoming the Blazing Saddles of Generations X, Y and Z, it is hard to resist in its charms." Meanwhile, Lillard's performance was universally praised.

=== Accolades ===
Gellar won the Teen Choice Award for Choice Movie Actress – Comedy. Prinze was nominated for the Golden Raspberry Award for Worst Supporting Actor (Razzie), but he lost to Hayden Christensen for Star Wars: Episode II – Attack of the Clones. It was also nominated for another Razzie, Most Flatulent Teen-Targeted Movie, but lost against Jackass: The Movie. It won the Kids' Choice Award for Favorite Fart in a Movie.

=== Legacy ===
Following the retirement of Casey Kasem as the voice of Shaggy, Lillard became the official voice of the character beginning with Scooby-Doo: Mystery Incorporated. In the same series, Cardellini voiced the supporting character Hot Dog Water opposite Velma.

The film and its sequel have developed a cult following since their release, mainly among enthusiasts of James Gunn's later work.

British electronic music producer and artist Fred Gibson took inspiration from the film's body-swapping sequence, specifically when the line "I'm Fred... again!" is spoken by Daphne, to create his official stage moniker, Fred again.

== Sequel ==
A sequel, Scooby-Doo 2: Monsters Unleashed, was released in 2004. Another sequel was planned, but canceled after the poor critical and financial results of the second film.
