= Night of the Living Doo =

2001 animated television special

- Title card
- Based on: Scooby-Doo by Joe Ruby and Ken Spears
- Written by: Casper Kelly; Jeffrey G. Olsen
- Directed by: Casper Kelly; Jeffrey G. Olsen
- Starring: Frank Welker; B.J. Ward; Grey DeLisle; Scott Innes; Gary Coleman; David Cross; Big Bad Voodoo Daddy; Mark Hamill
- Country of origin: United States
- Original language: English

Production
- Producers: Ashley Nixon; Casper Kelly; Jeffrey G. Olsen
- Running time: 20 minutes

Original release
- Network: Cartoon Network
- Release: October 31, 2001

Night of the Living Doo is an American animated television special that aired on Cartoon Network on October 31, 2001. The cartoon is a comedic parody of a typical episode of The New Scooby-Doo Movies, complete with unlikely guests and a retro style. Its title is a riff on the Night of the Living Dead franchise. The animation was produced by Cartoon Network and broadcast in small segments during commercial breaks of a Halloween Scooby-Doo marathon. At the end of the marathon, the complete special was broadcast in its entirety and was available on the Adult Swim website for a brief period. It has not been released on home video.

The special features a new opening title sequence combining the opening for The New Scooby-Doo Movies with clips of the special, set to the cover of the Scooby-Doo, Where Are You! theme song as performed by Matthew Sweet for Saturday Morning: Cartoons' Greatest Hits. It was nominated for an Annie Award.

In this special the characters are animated in a classic retro style in an effort to parody real episodes. The show is meant to have the 60s feel with modern humor and celebrities. Most of the scenes have the gang's animation directly rotoscoped from certain classic episodes, in some cases even completely re-dubbed footage.

== Plot ==
Scooby-Doo and the Mystery Inc. gang pick up a hitchhiking Gary Coleman, and the Mystery Machine soon proceeds to break down multiple times, finally leaving them stranded at a haunted castle owned by David Cross. The gang then spends the night at the haunted castle while their van is being fixed, mirroring many original episodes specifically including season two episode five of Scooby-Doo, Where Are You!, "Haunted House Hang-Up", where the van breaks down outside of a haunted mansion. The show contained multiple references and gags that take jabs at the original show, musical numbers by Big Bad Voodoo Daddy, as well as an appearance from Mark Hamill. Finally, the show concluded with a nonsensical ending, with Coleman pointing out all of the plot holes in the story. Scooby interrupts him by licking his face until the episode ends.

== Cast ==
- Frank Welker as Fred Jones and Jabberjaw/Zombie/Mummy
- B.J. Ward as Velma Dinkley
- Grey DeLisle as Daphne Blake
- Scott Innes as Scooby-Doo and Norville "Shaggy" Rogers
- Mark Hamill as Himself/Mr. Shifty/Zombie
- Gary Coleman as Himself
- David Cross as Himself
- Big Bad Voodoo Daddy as Themselves

== Cultural references ==
- The title, as mentioned, is a play on the Night of the Living Dead franchise.
- While Gary Coleman changes the Mystery Machine tire that went flat at the beginning of the show, Scooby starts singing the theme song from Diff'rent Strokes, the sitcom Gary was best known for. Scooby and Shaggy also use his catchphrase from the show, "whatchu talkin' 'bout [Willis]".
- Jabber breaks the fourth wall when he is revealed to be the monster, referencing the fact that the "mystery-solving teens" premise of his show is exactly like Scooby-Doo.
- Shaggy mentions "the force", which is a concept in the Star Wars saga.

== Reception ==
Mark Pellegrini of AiPT! enjoyed the special and felt that it did not veer too far into various content as it could have.

=== Accolades ===
Year	Award	Category	Result	Ref.
2002	Annie Awards	Best Animated Short Subject	Nominated	
