= Scott Innes =

American voice actor, author, songwriter and radio personality

- Born: October 1, 1966 (age 60); Poplar Bluff, Missouri, U.S.
- Occupations: Voice actor; author; songwriter; radio personality
- Years active: 1984–present
- Spouses: Jodie Innes (m. 1998; div. 2014); Cindy Harris (m. 2016)
- Children: 2
- Website: www.scottinnes.com www.onescottshop.com

Scott Innes (born October 1, 1966) is an American voice actor, author, songwriter and radio personality. He is best known for his voice over work in various Warner Bros. and Hanna-Barbera animated films, television shows, video games and commercials, most notably as Scooby-Doo, Shaggy Rogers, Scrappy-Doo, Popeye the Sailor, Fred Flintstone, Barney Rubble, Foghorn Leghorn, Muttley, Bugs Bunny, Yogi Bear and Captain Caveman. He has also provided the voices of Fred Jones, Boo-Boo Bear, Snagglepuss, Papa Smurf, Elroy Jetson, Astro, Quick Draw McGraw, Baba Looey, Elmer Fudd, Spike Bulldog and Ranger Smith in various commercials.

== Early life ==
Innes was born on October 1, 1966, in Poplar Bluff, Missouri. At a young age, realizing his ability to mimic voices, he recognized his passion for doing cartoon voices, including the cartoon character Scooby-Doo (of whom Innes became a fan in the early 1970s). Innes would listen to the actors performing the voices, determine how they created them, and learn how to do it himself. He would also recreate scenes from the series in his head at night to make himself fall asleep.

== Career ==
Innes became a radio personality at age 12, conducting interviews with cartoon voice acting giants like Don Messick (the voice of Scooby-Doo, among others), Daws Butler (the voice of Yogi Bear and Huckleberry Hound, among others), and Mel Blanc (the voice of Bugs Bunny, Yosemite Sam, and others). In 1980, Innes became a disc jockey at age 14, debuting on KLID in Poplar Bluff, Missouri. In 1990, he started working as a morning announcer for WABB-FM. During his spare time, he would imitate famous people over the intercommunications system, delighting employees at the station. He was later fired in order for him to expand his vocal abilities.

In 1991–1996, Innes was the host of Innes and Company on KKHT-FM in Springfield, Illinois. He created "Dear Daddy: The Wind Beneath My Wings", a remix of "Wind Beneath My Wings" by Bette Midler, featuring his son Josh Innes. The song was played as a requested track on more than 400 radio stations in the US. Innes also co-ran American Top 40 with Casey Kasem, the voice of Norville "Shaggy" Rogers in Scooby-Doo, whom Innes imitated when listening to him do the character's voice. He also tried his Scooby imitation, to which Messick told him, "You've got that Scooby down."

In 1996, Innes and Jim Hogg created Hollywood Hal and Rhinestone Al With the Wannabees, a show aimed at pre-kindergarteners that taught them about manners, safety, sharing, love, staying away from drugs, and other values. In 1997, Innes started working as the morning host of WRQQ and as the afternoon air personality at the country radio station WYNK-FM, both in Baton Rouge, Louisiana. At the former station, he performed "Shaggy on the Boulevard", a remix of "Dancin', Shaggin' on the Boulevard" by Alabama but sung in Shaggy's voice. Following Don Messick's retirement and death and Casey Kasem quitting the role of Shaggy, Innes became the voice of both Scooby-Doo and Shaggy between 1998 and 2001, beginning with the film Scooby-Doo on Zombie Island (Scooby) and the television special Scooby-Doo: Behind the Scenes (Shaggy); Innes also voiced Shaggy in promotions for said film. He continued to voice Scooby and Shaggy in 2002–2009 in most video games, PC games, toys, and commercials. Since 2010, he has been sporadically voicing the characters for toys, certain commercials such as McDonald's, the bank Halifax, and Walmart, as well as Scooby-Doo! The Museum of Mysteries at Warner Bros. World Abu Dhabi, and in the Scooby-Doo Playmobil shorts for WB Kids. In the Playmobil shorts and one of the McDonald's commercials, he also provided the voice of Fred Jones. Innes has also voiced Scooby's nephew, Scrappy-Doo, in the live-action film Scooby-Doo (2002), the television special The Scooby-Doo Project, video games, commercials, theme park attractions, toys, and the Harvey Birdman, Attorney at Law episode "Shaggy Busted".

Innes voiced Astro from The Jetsons in a series of RadioShack commercials in the late 1990s (alternating with Jeff Bergman and Billy West), and Fred Flintstone and Barney Rubble in a Toshiba commercial in 2002. He has briefly voiced other characters, including those by Don Messick, Daws Butler and Mel Blanc, whom he had interviewed as a youngster: Yogi Bear, Boo-Boo Bear, Ranger Smith, Wally Gator, Quick Draw McGraw, Bugs Bunny, Elmer Fudd, Foghorn Leghorn, Muttley, Professor Pat Pending, Snagglepuss, Captain Caveman, Shag Rugg, Droopy and Papa Smurf. Innes auditioned to voice Yogi and Boo-Boo for the film Yogi Bear (2010) but lost to Dan Aykroyd and Justin Timberlake. He also auditioned to return as Shaggy for the television series Scooby-Doo! Mystery Incorporated but lost the role to Matthew Lillard, who previously portrayed Shaggy in the 2002 film and its sequel Scooby-Doo 2: Monsters Unleashed (2004).

In 2003, Innes wrote the song "Handprints on the Wall", which was performed by Kenny Rogers. He is currently the publisher and author of Hug Magazine since 2010. In October 2011, he was let go from WYNK-FM as part of a new programming strategy and staff changes by Clear Channel Radio. On April 21, 2016, he joined nearby station WRKN in the same position of afternoon air personality.

== Personal life ==
Innes married his first wife, Jodie, on October 30, 1998. They divorced in 2014; together they have a son, Presley. Innes also has an older son named Josh, who works as a sports radio talk host in Houston, Texas. Innes married his second wife, Cindy Harris, in September 2016.

== Filmography ==
=== Film ===
List of voice performances in feature and direct-to-video films
Year	Title	Role	Notes
1998	Scooby-Doo on Zombie Island	Scooby-Doo	Direct-to-video
1999	Scooby-Doo! and the Witch's Ghost	Scooby-Doo, Shaggy Rogers	Direct-to-video
2000	Scooby-Doo and the Alien Invaders	Scooby-Doo, Shaggy Rogers	Direct-to-video
2001	Scooby-Doo and the Cyber Chase	Scooby-Doo/Cyber-Scooby, Shaggy Rogers/Cyber-Shaggy, The Creeper	Direct-to-video
2002	Scooby-Doo	Scrappy-Doo	
2004	Scooby-Doo and the Toon Tour of Mysteries	Norville "Shaggy" Rogers	DVD shorts
2020	Lost Treasure of Jesse James	Red Cloak Commander	
2022	Phantom of the Fields	Phantom	
2023	Shakespeare's Mummy	Anubis	

=== Television ===
List of voice performances in television shows
Year	Title	Role	Notes
1998	Scooby-Doo: Behind the Scenes	Scooby-Doo, Shaggy Rogers	TV special
1999	The Scooby-Doo Project	Scooby-Doo, Shaggy Rogers, Scrappy-Doo	TV special
2000	Scooby-Doo/Courage the Cowardly Dog Scare-A-Thon	Scooby-Doo, Shaggy Rogers	TV special
2000	JBVO	Scooby-Doo, Shaggy Rogers	2 episodes
2001	Night of the Living Doo	Scooby-Doo, Shaggy Rogers	TV special
2002	The 1st 13th Annual Fancy Anvil Awards Show Program Special	Scooby-Doo	TV special
2002, 2005	Harvey Birdman, Attorney at Law	Scooby-Doo, Shaggy Rogers, Scrappy-Doo, Prisoner #1	2 episodes
2004	Megas XLR	Argo	2 episodes

=== Video games ===
List of voice performances in video games
Year	Title	Role	Notes
1999	Scooby-Doo! Mystery of the Fun Park Phantom	Scooby-Doo, Shaggy Rogers	
2000	Scooby-Doo Mystery Adventures! Showdown in Ghost Town	Scooby-Doo, Shaggy Rogers, Scrappy-Doo	
2000	Scooby-Doo Mystery Adventures! Phantom of the Knight	Scooby-Doo, Shaggy Rogers, Scrappy-Doo	
2000	Wacky Races	Professor Pat Pending	
2000	Scooby-Doo! Classic Creep Capers	Scooby-Doo, Shaggy Rogers	
2001	Scooby-Doo: Activity Challenge	Scooby-Doo, Shaggy Rogers	
2001	Scooby-Doo Mystery Adventures! Jinx at the Sphinx	Scooby-Doo, Shaggy Rogers, Scrappy-Doo	
2001	Scooby-Doo and the Cyber Chase	Scooby-Doo, Shaggy Rogers	
2002	Scooby-Doo! Night of 100 Frights	Scooby-Doo, Shaggy Rogers	
2002	Scooby-Doo! Case File 1: The Glowing Bug Man	Scooby-Doo, Shaggy Rogers	
2003	Scooby-Doo! Case File 2: The Scary Stone Dragon	Scooby-Doo, Shaggy Rogers	
2004	Scooby-Doo! Mystery Mayhem	Scooby-Doo, Shaggy Rogers	
2004	Scooby-Doo! Horror of the High Seas	Scooby-Doo, Shaggy Rogers	PC game, 4 parts
2004	Scooby-Doo! Mystery at the Snack Factory	Scooby-Doo, Shaggy Rogers	DVD Game
2005	Scooby-Doo! Funland Frenzy	Scooby-Doo, Shaggy Rogers	DVD Game
2005	Scooby-Doo! Mayan Monster Mayhem	Scooby-Doo, Shaggy Rogers	PC game, 4 parts
2005	Scooby-Doo! Unmasked	Scooby-Doo, Shaggy Rogers	
2006	Scooby-Doo! Ancient Adventure	Scooby-Doo, Shaggy Rogers, narrator	DVD game
2006	Scooby-Doo! Case File 3: Frights! Camera! Mystery!	Scooby-Doo, Shaggy Rogers	
2006	Scooby-Doo! Who's Watching Who?	Scooby-Doo, Shaggy Rogers	
2006	Scooby-Doo! Haunts for the Holidays	Scooby-Doo, Shaggy Rogers	PC game, 3 parts
2007	Scooby-Doo! A Night of Fright is no Delight	Scooby-Doo, Shaggy Rogers	DVD game
2007	Scooby-Doo! DVD Board Game	Scooby-Doo, Shaggy Rogers	DVD game
2007	Scooby-Doo! Lost Island Adventure	Scooby-Doo, Shaggy Rogers	DVD game
2008	Scooby-Doo! Construction Crash Course	Scooby-Doo, Shaggy Rogers	PC game
2008	Scooby-Doo! Funland of Freaky Frights	Shaggy Rogers	DVD game
2009	Scooby-Doo! First Frights	Shaggy Rogers	

=== Live-action ===
List of acting performances in film and television
Year	Title	Role	Notes
2006	The 100 Greatest TV Quotes & Catchphrases	Himself	TV mini-series documentary; 5 episodes
2008	Huntin' Buddies	Shirt Clerk	Direct-to-video
2009	LA-308 Assassin Redemption	Scott Bannister	Direct-to-video
2012	Cajun Pawn Stars	Himself	1 episode
2016	Like Son	Fireman	
2017	4: GO	Guard #2	Direct-to-video
2019	Christmas Cars	Himself	
2020	Sprout Central TV	Himself	
2020	IncrediChat	Guest	1 episode
2020	Christmas Coffee	Scooter Walker	
2020	Go Fishin	Scotty Thibodeaux	Also writer, composer and producer
2022	Tres Leches	Alvin	
2022	Love, Game, Match	Himself	
2022	Before We Break	Radio Host	Short film
2023	Bad Habit	Police Chief	Also location manager, writer and producer
2023	Tad Caldwell & The Monster Kid	Rick	
2023	The Iron Claw	Ring Announcer	

=== Web ===
List of voice performances in web series
Year	Title	Role	Notes
2020	Scooby-Doo! Playmobil Mini Mysteries	Scooby-Doo, Norville "Shaggy" Rogers, Fred Jones	Warner Bros. web shorts

=== Theme parks ===
List of voice performances in theme parks
Year	Title	Role	Notes
2000	Scooby-Doo's Haunted Mansion	Scooby-Doo, Norville "Shaggy" Rogers	Six Flags park attraction; Kings Island, Kings Dominion, Canada's Wonderland and Carowinds versions
2008	River Battle	Ranger	Dollywood park attraction
2018	Scooby-Doo: The Museum of Mysteries!	Norville "Shaggy" Rogers	Warner Bros. World Abu Dhabi park attraction
2018	Scooby-Doo Spooky Coaster: Next Generation	Scrappy-Doo	Warner Bros. Movie World park attraction

=== Commercials ===
- Radio Shack - Astro Jetson
- Campbell Soup - Popeye
- Cartoon Network bumpers - Scooby-Doo, Norville "Shaggy" Rogers, Scrappy-Doo, Creeper, Ghost Clown, Ghost of Mr. Hyde, Astro Jetson, Shag Rugg, Snagglepuss
- Passport commercial - Scooby-Doo, Captain Caveman, Muttley
- Post Cereal Ad - Scooby-Doo
- Kraft Pasta - Scooby-Doo, Norville "Shaggy" Rogers
- Toshiba - Fred Flintstone, Barney Rubble, George Jetson
- Kellogg's - Scooby-Doo, Norville "Shaggy" Rogers
- Airheads - Scooby-Doo, Norville "Shaggy" Rogers
- McDonald's - Scooby-Doo, Norville "Shaggy" Rogers, Fred Jones
- Chia Pet - Scooby-Doo
- Kid Cuisine - Scooby-Doo, Norville "Shaggy" Rogers
- GoGurt - Scooby-Doo, Norville "Shaggy" Rogers
- Plushie and CD-ROM - Scooby-Doo, Norville "Shaggy" Rogers
- Halifax - Scooby-Doo, Norville "Shaggy" Rogers, Mummy
- Walmart - Scooby-Doo

=== Songs ===
Year	Song	Album	Singer
2003	Handprints on the Wall	Back to the Well	Kenny Rogers

Preceded by Hadley Kay	Voice of Scooby-Doo; 1998–2008; 2010; 2011; 2014; 2017; 2019; 2020	Succeeded by Neil Fanning (2002; 2004); Frank Welker (2002–present)
Preceded by Billy West	Voice of Norville "Shaggy" Rogers; 1998–2009; 2010; 2011; 2014; 2017; 2018; 2020	Succeeded by Casey Kasem (2002–2009); Matthew Lillard (2010–present)
Preceded by Don Messick	Voice of Scrappy-Doo; 1999–2018	Succeeded by Jason Mantzoukas (2024)
