= Neil Fanning =

Australian actor (born 1967)

- Born: 12 April 1967 (age 59); Brisbane, Queensland, Australia
- Occupations: Actor; stuntman; safety supervisor
- Years active: 1991–present
- Children: 3

Neil Fanning (born 12 April 1967) is an Australian actor, stuntman and safety supervisor. He is best known for performing the voice of the lead character Scooby-Doo in the movies Scooby-Doo and Scooby-Doo 2: Monsters Unleashed. Neil's entertainment career has spanned over 30 years performing live shows and over 50 movie, television and commercial roles.

== Career ==
Beginning as an opening day entertainer in June 1991, Neil continued to perform for 14 years in the highly successful and #1 rated attraction the Police Academy Stunt Show at Warner Bros. Movie World on the Gold Coast in Queensland, Australia and was the theme park's Employee of the Year in 1997. Neil was the Manager of the Police Academy Stunt Show for many years and represented Warner Bros. Movie World internationally performing shows in Asia. Neil was nominated as Australia's International Performer of the Year at the 1998 International Theme Parks Awards in the USA.

In 2015, Neil returned to Warner Bros Movie World for two years to perform as a precision drift driver in the Hollywood Stunt Driver 2 Show and was also the shows General Manager for 12 months. Neil was also a Stunt Driving Instructor for locally based company The Stunt Driving Experience and represented Warner Bros. Movie World performing as a High-Speed Precision Stunt Driver from 1998 to 2001 in choreographed car chase shows as a feature of the on-track entertainment for the Gold Coast Indy 300 event. Neil also performed at Dreamworld as a character actor for numerous high season periods. Neil and his son Brodie wrote and created The Brodie And Dad Show, a comedy Podcast of skits and stories with multiple voices and characters performed with his son Brodie that reached Number 3 on iTunes in 2010.

== Personal life ==
Neil has 3 children.

Neil volunteers his time as Patron for the East Maitland's Miracle Assistance Dogs organization.

== Filmography ==
=== Film ===
Year	Title	Role	Notes
1998	Chameleon	IBI Agent	Stunts
2002	The Crocodile Hunter: Collision Course		Stunts
2002	Ghost Ship		Stunts
2002	Scooby-Doo	Scooby-Doo (voice)	
2004	Scooby-Doo 2: Monsters Unleashed	Scooby-Doo (voice)	
2005	The Great Raid		Stunts
2009	Daybreakers		Stunts

=== Television ===
Year	Title	Role	Notes
2009	Sea Patrol	McCan	Episode: "Secret Cargo"
2010	Sea Patrol		Stunts
2016	Wanted	Roadhouse Cop	Season 1, Episode 2
2018	Tidelands		Stunts, 1 episode

=== Video games ===
Year	Title	Role	Notes
2004	Scooby-Doo 2: Monsters Unleashed – The Video Game	Scooby-Doo	

Preceded by Scott Innes	Voice of Scooby-Doo; 2002–2004	Succeeded by Frank Welker
