= Stephen Hunter (actor) =

New Zealand actor and voice over artist

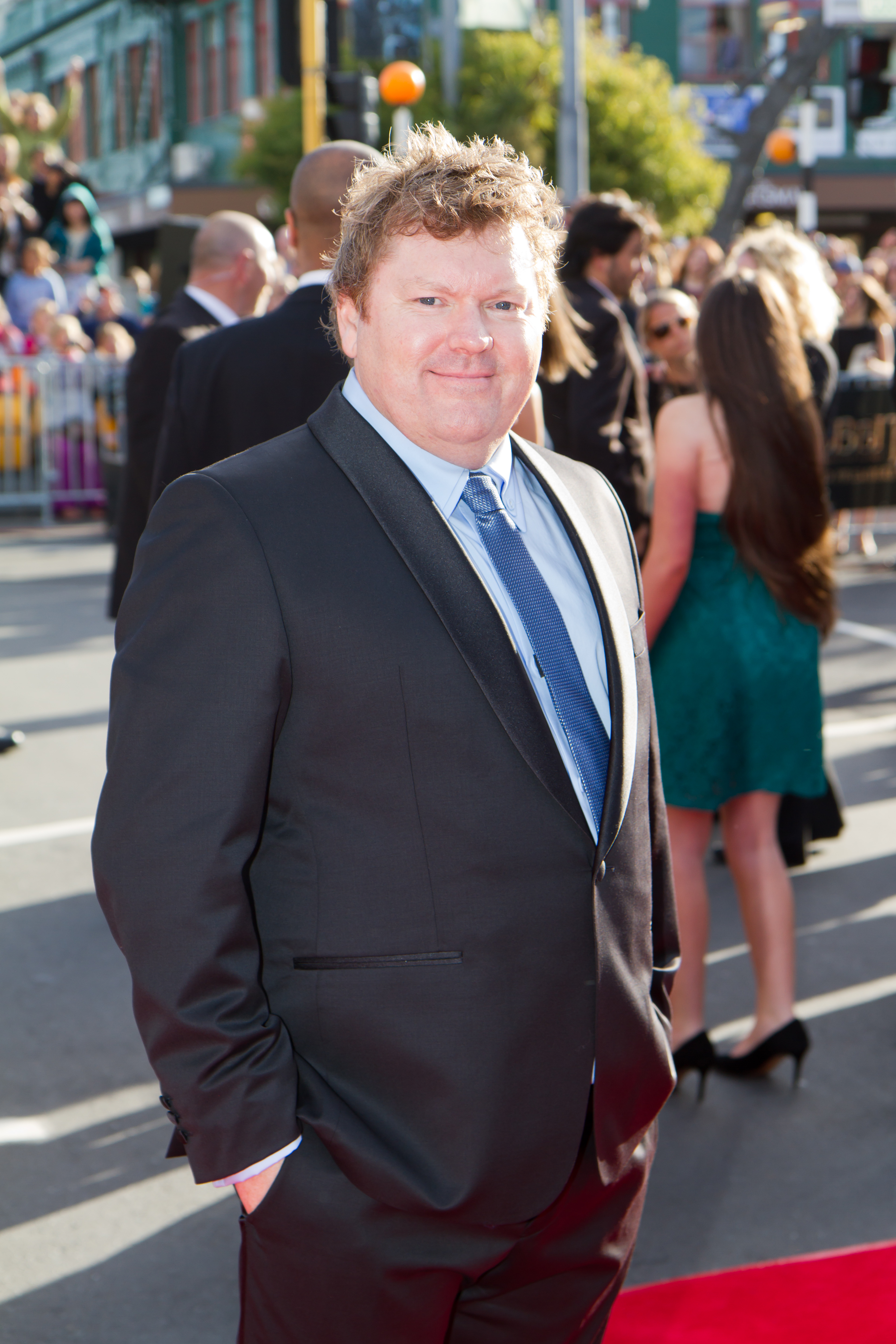
- Hunter at the world premiere of The Hobbit - An Unexpected Journey - November 2012 Wellington, New Zealand
- Born: Stephen John Hunter; 28 October 1968 (age 57); Wellington, New Zealand
- Occupation: Actor
- Years active: 1995–present

Stephen John Hunter (born 28 October 1968) is a New Zealand actor and voice over artist, based in Sydney, Australia. He played the Dwarf Bombur in The Hobbit film series.

== Filmography ==
=== Films ===
Year	Film	Role
2012	The Hobbit: An Unexpected Journey	Bombur
2013	The Hobbit: The Desolation of Smaug	Bombur
2014	The Hobbit: The Battle of the Five Armies	Bombur
2016	Blue World Order	MadCap
2016	Killing Ground	Constable Chris Armstrong
2018	The Merger	Neville
2019	Two Heads Creek	Clive
2019	The Whistleblower	Hidden Truth News Reporter
2020	Escape from Pretoria	Peter Jenkin
2020	Children of the Corn	Calvin Cunningham
2022	Thor: Love and Thunder	Fur God
2025	Play Dirty	Vault Security Guard

=== Television ===
Year	Series	Role	Notes
2002	Street Legal	Stan	1 episode: "Charter"
2003	Mercy Peak	Farmer	1 episode: "Fork in the Road"
2006	Love My Way	Sharpie	5 episodes
2008	All Saints	Scott Griffith / Det. Sgt. James Nader	3 episodes
2009	CJ the DJ	Si (voice)	
2010	Review with Myles Barlow	Kyle Sandilands	6 episodes
2010	Spirited	Larry	1 episode: "I Remember Nothing"
2011	Rescue: Special Ops	Kenny Whaley	1 episode "True Romance"
2014	Field Punishment No.1	Aussie Bill	TV movie
2016	Janet King	Felix Murphy	4 episodes
2015/6	Home & Away	Barry	2 episodes
2016	Rosehaven	John	1 episode
2017	The Leftovers	Hazmat Man	1 episode
2017	Wolf Creek	Richie	2 episodes
2018	WANTED	Warren Miller	2 episodes
2019	Fresh Eggs	Joe	4 episodes
2019	Reef Break	Otter	7 episodes
2020	Halifax: Retribution	Joe Azzopardi	1 episode
