= Scooby-Doo (character) =

Animated cartoon dog

- Scooby-Doo character
- First appearance: "What a Night for a Knight"; Scooby-Doo, Where Are You!; September 13, 1969
- Created by: Joe Ruby; Ken Spears; Iwao Takamoto
- Voiced by: Don Messick (1969–1996); Frank Welker (1979, 2002–present); Hadley Kay (1997); Scott Innes (1998–2008, 2017–2020); Neil Fanning (2002–2004); (see below)

In-universe information
- Full name: Scoobert Doo
- Nicknames: Scooby-Dooby-Doo; Scooby-Doo; Scooby; Scoob
- Species: Dog (Great Dane)
- Gender: Male

Scoobert Doo, more commonly known as Scooby-Doo, is an American cartoon character and the titular main protagonist of the eponymous animated television franchise created in 1969 by the American animation company Hanna-Barbera. He is a male Great Dane and lifelong companion of amateur detective Shaggy Rogers, with whom he shares many personality traits. He features a mix of both canine and human behaviors (reminiscent of other talking animals in Hanna-Barbera's series) and is treated by his friends more or less as an equal. Scooby often speaks in a rhotacized way, substituting the first letters of many words with the letter 'r' a speech pattern that, while never fully explained, is understood and accepted without question by those around him. His catchphrase is "Scooby-Dooby-Doo!"

== History ==
Writers Joe Ruby and Ken Spears created the original Scooby-Doo series, Scooby-Doo, Where Are You!, for Hanna-Barbera as a part of CBS's 1969–1970 Saturday morning cartoon schedule. Originally titled Mysteries Five, the dog who later became Scooby was originally more of a sidekick character – a bongo-playing dog named "Too Much" whose breed varied between Great Dane and sheepdog between treatments.

By the time the series was pitched to the network as Who's S-S-Scared? in early 1969, Too Much was solidified as a cowardly Great Dane. Both the dog and the series would be renamed Scooby-Doo by Fred Silverman, CBS's head of daytime programming, between its unsuccessful first pitch and the second pitch that earned the show a green light. Silverman stated that he came up with the name from the syllables "doo-be-doo-be-doo" in Frank Sinatra's hit song "Strangers in the Night". However, production designer Iwao Takamoto stated that earlier concepts and a model sheet for a dog named "Scooby" existed in the studio's archives from the early 1960s prior to Silverman's story, and animation historian Mark Evanier believed that the name was inspired by "Denise" by Randy & the Rainbows, where the members sang, "Scooby-Doo" over and over, while the "Dooby" part came from "Strangers in the Night. A similar name was featured in the title of the single "Feelin' So Good (S.K.O.O.B.Y.-D.O.O.)" released just a few months earlier in 1968 by The Archies, a fictional band from the CBS series The Archie Show that was also overseen by Silverman. There was also a character in an unsold TV pilot Swingin' Together, broadcast in 1963 on CBS, named Skooby-doo.

Taking notes from a Hanna-Barbera colleague who was also a breeder of Great Danes, Takamoto designed the Scooby-Doo character with a sloping chin, spots, a long tail, a sloped back, and bow legs – all traits in direct opposition to those of a prize-winning purebred Great Dane. In defining the personality of the dog, Ruby and Spears looked for inspiration to the characters played by Bob Hope in his horror-comedies – a coward who shows traits of bravery when his friends are in danger. Veteran Hanna-Barbera voice artist Don Messick was the original voice of Scooby and spent decades working on the character.

Scooby-Doo, Where Are You! premiered on CBS on September 13, 1969, at 10:30 a.m. Eastern Time. It ran for two seasons, with a total of 25 episodes. Its final first-run episode aired on October 31, 1970.

== Personality ==
In most incarnations, Scooby is regarded as a unique Great Dane dog who is able to speak in broken English who usually puts the letter r in front of words and noises made. In some incarnations, such as A Pup Named Scooby-Doo, he is presented as a speech-impaired dog in the larger fictional universe as nobody in Coolsville seems bothered by his speaking ability. In more recent incarnations (most notably in Scooby-Doo! Mystery Incorporated), Scooby is able to speak in complete sentences and has more dialogue, though partially retaining his speech impediment. He consistently shows about the same level of intelligence as his friends, while also being subject to the same knack for clumsiness and moments of being dimwitted as well.

Different iterations of the character have been developed and expanded in the various series featuring the characters, many of them contradicting, such as the original series and the recent live-action films where Shaggy and Scooby first meet as older teenagers for the first time. This differs from the series A Pup Named Scooby-Doo, where they know each other from almost infancy, though the films may be seen as having a different continuity altogether than the cartoon products. As an adult canine, Scooby is usually treated as a mix of a pet and a friend by his companions.

In all versions of the character, Scooby and Shaggy share several personality traits, mostly being cowardly and perpetually hungry. Yet their friends (Fred, Daphne, and Velma) encourage them to go after the costumed villains, usually with "Scooby Snacks", a biscuit-like dog treat or cookie snack which often is shaped like a bone or, in later versions of the cartoons, Scooby's ID tag. However, Scooby's inherent loyalty and courage do often force him to take a more heroic stance even without any prodding. Scooby is also very ticklish, depicted in many of the television series and films.

Even with Scooby's speech impediment, most characters are able to understand him almost perfectly. In most iterations, he keeps his sentences relatively short, usually using charades for anything longer than three or four words. His catchphrase, usually howled at the end of every production, is "Scooby-Dooby-Doo!" (often pronounced "Rooby-Rooby-Roo"). Scooby was voiced by Don Messick through Arabian Nights in 1994, after which point Messick quit smoking; quitting smoking changed his voice and prevented him from achieving the same raspy vocal effect. (Note: Despite Messick's efforts, he suffered a career-ending stroke in 1996 and died in 1997, before any further Scooby-Doo productions were made.) Messick is also known for providing the voice of the dogs Astro on The Jetsons and the snickering Muttley. The characteristic speech impediments of Scooby and Astro are similar; however, of the two voices, Scooby's had a deeper and throatier timbre than Astro's.

According to Fred in Scooby-Doo: Behind the Scenes, the thought of having a dog with an Adam's apple was a little strange, but they got used to it, so when he started talking, it wasn't a big deal. But despite his special gift of speech, he did have his shortcomings like his cowardice. But as Mystery Inc. bonded, he would form a special partnership with Shaggy, comparing themselves to Sherlock Holmes and Dr. Watson. Shaggy says that things just clicked and whenever the gang needs bait for a villain, they would send Shaggy and Scooby in and he says there's no one else he would rather work with. Fred claims that the only thing that scares Scooby more than monsters is a trip to the vet.

== Appearance and anatomy ==
Scooby is brown from head to toe with several distinctive black spots on his upper body and does not seem to have a melanistic mask. He is generally a quadruped but displays bipedal 'human' characteristics occasionally. Scooby also has opposable thumbs and can use his front paws like hands. He has a black nose and wears an off-yellow, diamond-shaped-tagged blue collar with an "SD" (his initials) and has four toes on each foot. Unlike other dogs, Scooby only has one pad on each of his paws, a trait that was added to make it easier to draw in the Scooby-Doo Annuals.

Scooby has a fully prehensile tail he can use to swing from or press buttons. Both his head and tail are malleable and useful as a communication aid or creating a distraction.

Iwao Takamoto, the artist who designed Scooby-Doo, first interviewed a Great Dane breeder to identify the most desirable features in pedigree Great Danes. He gave Scooby none of them: "I decided to go the opposite and gave him a hump back, bowed legs, small chin and such. Even his color is wrong."

According to the official magazine that accompanied the 2002 film, Scooby is seven years old.

== Voice actors ==
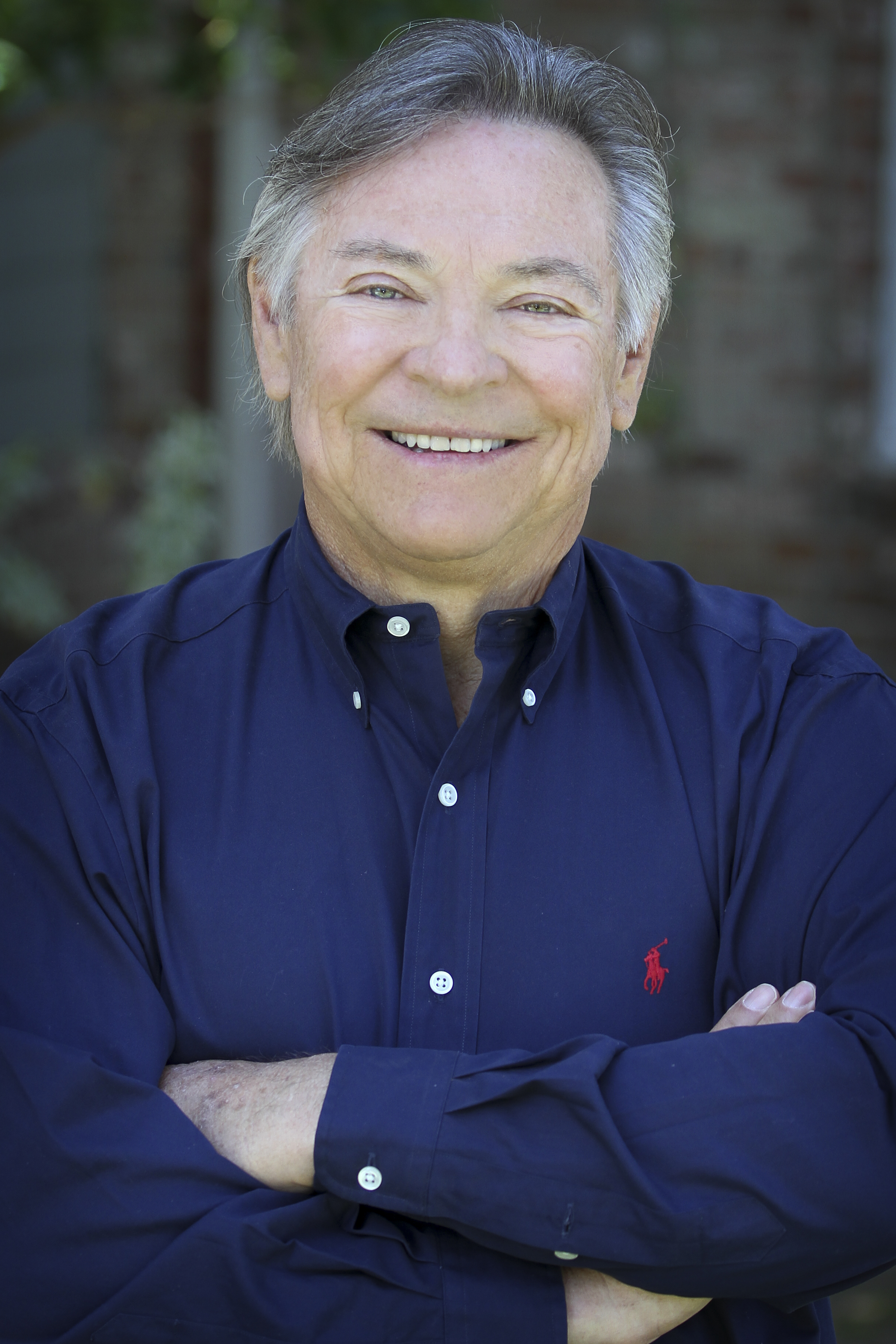
Frank Welker (pictured in 2016), Scooby's current voice actor

Don Messick originated the character's speech patterns and provided Scooby-Doo's voice in every Scooby-Doo production from 1969 until his retirement in 1996. Frank Welker (also the voice of Fred since 1969) was approached to take over the role, but was initially reluctant to do so. Voice actor Hadley Kay voiced the character for a brief period in 1997, for two episodes of Johnny Bravo, and a few television commercials. Scott Innes (also the then-voice of Shaggy) voiced Scooby-Doo in the 1998-2001 direct-to-video films and continued to voice the character regularly for video games (such as Scooby-Doo! Night of 100 Frights), toys and some commercials until 2008. Kay was selected by William Hanna to provide the voice of the computer-generated Scooby-Doo in the 2002 live-action film, but was later fired. Innes was also going to voice Scooby in the film, but was replaced with Neil Fanning, who reprised his role for its 2004 sequel. Welker has voiced Scooby since 2002, taking over beginning with What's New, Scooby-Doo? and other spin-offs including the live-action reboot film series Scooby-Doo! The Mystery Begins and Scooby-Doo! Curse of the Lake Monster, 2020 computer-animated film Scoob!.

=== Voiced by ===
- Don Messick (1969–1996)
- Frank Welker (1979, 1996–1997, 2002–present; Scooby Goes Hollywood (as Baby Scooby-Doo), What's New, Scooby-Doo?, Sabrina the Teenage Witch, Looney Tunes: Back in Action, Shaggy & Scooby-Doo Get a Clue!, Scooby-Doo! The Mystery Begins, Scooby-Doo! Curse of the Lake Monster, Scooby-Doo! Mystery Incorporated, Batman: The Brave and the Bold, Be Cool, Scooby-Doo!, Scooby-Doo! The Museum of Mysteries, Scooby-Doo and Guess Who?, Scoob!, various direct-to-DVD films, specials, video games, and commercials)
- Unknown (1981–1985, 1991; Canada's Wonderland live shows, Hanna-Barbera Land live shows, 1984 Macy's Thanksgiving Day Parade, Hanna-Barbera Fun!, Looking for a Home, ABC Family Fun Fair, Ice Capades)
- Keith Scott (1981, 1997; Pauls commercial, Hanna-Barbera Gala Celebrity Nite)
- Allan Melvin (1982; Yogi's Picnic)
- Bill Farmer (1989–1990; ABC Family Fun Fair)
- Greg Burson (1997; PrimeStar commercial, one line in Johnny Bravo)
- Hadley Kay (1997–1998; Johnny Bravo, commercials)
- Scott Innes (1998–2008, 2017–2020; Scooby-Doo on Zombie Island, Scooby-Doo and the Witch's Ghost, The Scooby-Doo Project, Scooby-Doo and the Alien Invaders, Scooby-Doo's Haunted Mansion, Scooby-Doo and the Cyber Chase, Harvey Birdman, Attorney at Law, Scooby-Doo (original cut), Scooby-Doo! Playmobil Mini Mysteries, various video games, specials, talking toys, and commercials)
- Marc Silk (1998, 2002–2009, 2015–present; Radio 1 Breakfast, Cartoon Network UK and Ireland bumpers, Boomerang UK and Ireland bumpers, CITV bumpers, Adidas commercial, Scooby-Doo! and the Pirate Ghost - Live on Stage commercial, Lego Scooby-Doo! commercial)
- John Nagle (2001; Scooby-Doo! in Stagefright - Live on Stage)
- David Droxler (2001; Scooby-Doo! in Stagefright - Live on Stage)
- Pierre-Marc Diennet (2001; Scooby-Doo! in Stagefright - Live on Stage)
- Kenny James (2001; phone message)
- Neil Fanning (2002–2004; Scooby-Doo, Scooby-Doo Spooky Coaster, Scooby-Doo 2: Monsters Unleashed, Scooby-Doo 2: Monsters Unleashed – The Video Game)
- J. P. Manoux (2004; Scooby-Doo 2: Monsters Unleashed (as Scooby Brainiac))
- James Arnold Taylor (2004; additional lines in Scooby-Doo 2: Monsters Unleashed)
- Jeff Bergman (2004; Boomerang UK bumper)
- Danny Bage (2009; Scooby-Doo! and the Pirate Ghost - Live on Stage)
- Jess Harnell (2012; Big Top Scooby-Doo! (as Human Scooby-Doo))

=== Portrayed by ===
- David Droxler (2001; Scooby-Doo! in Stagefright - Live on Stage)
- Pierre-Marc Diennet (2001; Scooby-Doo! in Stagefright - Live on Stage)
- Jamie Brown (2009; Scooby-Doo! and the Pirate Ghost - Live on Stage)
- Cody Collier (2013; Scooby-Doo Live! Musical Mysteries)
- Eddie Arnold (2014; Scooby-Doo Live! The Mystery of the Pyramid)
- Joe Goldie (2016; Scooby-Doo Live! Musical Mysteries)
- Clement Chaboche (2020; Scooby-Doo! and the Lost City of Gold)
- Gabriela Jovian-Mazon (2022; Scooby-Doo! and the Lost City of Gold)

=== Voiced by in unofficial material ===
- Seth MacFarlane (1999; Family Guy)
- Mark Hamill (2001; Jay and Silent Bob Strike Back)
- Dave Coulier (2005; Robot Chicken)
- Seth Green (2007–2019; Robot Chicken)
- James Arnold Taylor (2007; Drawn Together)
- Scott McCord (2008; Yin Yang Yo!)
- Kevin Shinick (2011; Mad)
- Mikey Day (2012; Mad)
- Andrew Dismukes (2024; Saturday Night Live)

== Appearances in other media ==
- Scooby-Doo has appeared in Johnny Bravo in the episodes "Bravo Dooby-Doo" and "'Twas the Night" during the first season, voiced both times by Hadley Kay. He was originally going to be voiced by Greg Burson, but was replaced with Kay due to the executives at Cartoon Network thinking that he did not sound enough like Scooby.
- In the Animaniacs episode "Back in Style", Yakko, Wakko, and Dot are loaned off to limited animation television cartoons, including a Scooby-Doo parody named Uhuru, Where Are You?. They scare and ride the show's canine star, Uhuru (voiced by Frank Welker), and injure the cast by playing fake rock and roll music.
- Jay and Silent Bob Strike Back has a brief scene where the title characters hitch a ride in the Mystery Machine with Scooby and the gang. Scooby was voiced by Mark Hamill.
- Scooby-Doo and Shaggy make an appearance in the Sabrina the Teenage Witch live action series episode "Sabrina Unplugged".
- Scooby and Shaggy make a cameo appearance in the 2003 live-action/animated film Looney Tunes: Back in Action, where Shaggy berates Matthew Lillard over his portrayal of Shaggy in the 2002 live-action film and threatens to "come after" him if he screws up in the sequel.
- Scooby-Doo was once impersonated by David Beckham in a 2004 Adidas commercial in the United Kingdom.
- Scooby-Doo appears in the Robot Chicken episode "Operation: Rich in Spirit", voiced by Dave Coulier (who previously imitated Scooby's voice in Full House). He is amongst the Mystery Inc. members who end up killed by Jason Voorhees except Velma. Seth Green voices him in the episode "Ban on the Fun" when in the segment that spoofs Laff-A-Lympics in the style of the Munich massacre. This time, Scooby did not get killed.
- In the Yin Yang Yo! episode "Slumber Party of Doom", Scooby and Shaggy make two cameo appearances where they complain about Yin and Yang stealing their montages. Scooby is colored gray instead of brown.
- Scooby-Doo and Shaggy both appeared in "The Official BBC Children in Need Medley" in 2009.
- Scooby-Doo and the Mystery Inc. gang appear in the second part of the Batman: The Brave and the Bold episode "Bat-Mite Presents: Batman's Strangest Cases", in which they team up with Batman and Robin to rescue Weird Al, who was kidnapped by the Joker and the Penguin.
- Scooby and Shaggy make a non-speaking cameo in Teen Titans Go! episode, "I See You" when Cyborg and Beast Boy were rapping. In the episode "The Cruel Giggling Ghoul", each Titan assumes the role of a Scooby Gang member (with Beast Boy as Scooby) to investigate a mystery at a spooky amusement park, with the help of LeBron James. Scooby later appears in the crossover episode "Cartoon Feud" along with Shaggy, Fred, Daphne and Velma, where Control Freak forces them to compete in Family Feud, with Frank Welker reprising the role of Scooby. They later appear in the episodes "Intro" and "Warner Bros. 100th Anniversary".
- In the episode "Saturday Morning Fun Pit" (7ACV19), on the Futurama series, Bender is re-conceived as a parody of Scooby-Doo, and named Bendee Boo.
- Scooby-Doo is a playable character alongside Shaggy in the crossover video game Lego Dimensions. His character includes a large sandwich called the "Scooby Snack". Frank Welker reprises the role.
- Scooby, along with the other four members of Mystery Inc., appears throughout the 16th episode of the 13th season of Supernatural entitled "Scoobynatural" when the two lead protagonists, Sam Winchester and his brother Dean Winchester, and their accomplice, Castiel, are transported into an episode of Scooby-Doo; the Supernatural episode itself is a crossover between the two franchises, with Frank Welker voicing Scooby-Doo in the episode.
- Scooby-Doo appears in the 2021 film Space Jam: A New Legacy. His design is the same from the 2020 film, Scoob!.
- Scooby-Doo makes a non-speaking cameo appearance in Mortal Kombat Legends: Battle of the Realms, where he is seen alongside Shaggy in his "Ultra Instinct Shaggy" form in the Warner Bros. Animation logo after the latter grabs Scorpion by the neck and pulls him into the Netherrealm.
- Scooby-Doo makes a non-speaking appearance in Jellystone! in the episode "Frankenhooky", where he and the Mystery Inc. Gang stop the Ghost Chasers from attacking Yogi Bear and Boo-Boo at an abandoned cheese theme park.
- Scooby-Doo appears in Fortnite during 2025's Fortnitemares. He appears with other members of Mystery Incorporated and was added to the game October 10.

== Reception ==
Casey Kasem, the original voice actor for Shaggy Rogers, said that Scooby is "the star of the show—the Shaquille O'Neal of the show." Kasem explained, "People love animals more than they love people. Am I right or wrong? They give more love to their pets than they give to people. Scooby is vulnerable and lovable and not brave, and very much like the kids who watch. But like kids, he likes to think that he's brave."

== See also ==
- William Hanna
- Joseph Barbera
- List of fictional dogs
