= List of animated feature films of 1988 =

This is a list of animated feature films first released in 1988.

== List ==
Title	Country	Director	Production company	Animation technique	Format	Notes	Release date	Duration
Akira アキラ	Japan	Katsuhiro Otomo	Toho (distributor); Tokyo Movie Shinsha; Akira Committee	Traditional	Theatrical		July 16, 1988	124 minutes
Alice; Něco z Alenky (Something from Alice)	Czechoslovakia	Jan Švankmajer	Channel Four Films; Condor Films	Stop motion/Live action	Theatrical; Live-action animated film		May 13, 1988	86 minutes
Alice in Wonderland	Australia	Rich Trueblood	Burbank Films Australia	Traditional	Television film		July 10, 1988	51 minutes
Appleseed アップルシード (Appurushīdo)	Japan	Kazuyoshi Katayama	Bandai Visual	Traditional	Direct-to-video; OVA		April 21, 1988	70 minutes
Armored Trooper Votoms: The Red Shoulder Document - Roots of Ambition 装甲騎兵ボトムズ レッドショルダードキュメント 野望のルーツ (Sōkō Kihei Botomuzu: Reddo Shorudā Dokyumento - Yabō no Rūtsu)	Japan	Ryousuke Takahashi	Sunrise; Bandai Visual (distributor)	Traditional	Direct-to-video; OVA		March 19, 1988	60 minutes
Around the World in 80 Days	Australia	Geoff Collins	Burbank Films Australia	Traditional	Television film		November 25, 1988	49 minutes
Ben-Hur	Ireland	Al Guest; Jean Mathieson	Emerald City Productions	Traditional	Television film		?	48 minutes
Bikkuriman: Moen Zone no Himitsu ビックリマン 無縁ゾーンの秘宝 (Bikkuriman: The Hidden Treasure of the Unrelated Zone)	Japan	Junichi Sato	Toei Animation	Traditional	Theatrical		July 9, 1988	45 minutes
The Black Arrow	Australia		Burbank Films Australia	Traditional	Television film		October 18, 1988	55 minutes
Black Tulip	Australia		Burbank Films Australia	Traditional	Television film		February 10, 1988	49 minutes
BraveStarr: The Movie	United States	Tom Tataranowicz	Filmation	Traditional	Theatrical		March 18, 1988	91 minutes
Captain of the Forest; Az erdő kapitánya	Hungary	Attila Dargay	Pannónia Filmstúdió; Infafilm Gmbh	Traditional	Theatrical		February 18, 1988	70 minutes
Care Bears Nutcracker Suite	Canada	Joseph Sherman; Laura Shepherd	Nelvana	Traditional	Television special		December 10, 1988	62 minutes
The Cat Who Walked by Herself; Кошка, которая гуляла сама по себе (Koshka, kotoraya gulyala sama po sebe)	Soviet Union	Ideya Garanina	Soyuzmultfilm	Stop motion/Traditional		First Soviet full-length animated film uniting the stop-motion and traditional animation styles.	?	70 minutes
Daffy Duck's Quackbusters	United States	Greg Ford (original footage); Friz Freleng (archive footage); Chuck Jones (archive footage); Terry Lennon (original footage); Robert McKimson (archive footage)	Warner Bros. Animation	Traditional	Theatrical; Compilation film	Film compiled from theatrical animated shorts; sixth and final of six Looney Tunes compilation feature films.	September 24, 1988	78 minutes
David and the Magic Pearl Dawid i Sandy (David & Sandy)	Poland; Sweden	Zbigniew Stanislawski; Wieslaw Zieba	Film Polski (Poland); AB Svensk Filmindustri (Sweden)	Traditional	Theatrical		June 22, 1988	71 minutes
Demon City Shinjuku 魔界都市〈新宿〉 (Makai Toshi: Shinjuku)	Japan	Yoshiaki Kawajiri	Madhouse	Traditional	Direct-to-video; OVA		October 25, 1988	80 minutes
Dokgo Tak's Pigeon Chorus 독고탁의 비둘기 합창 (Dokgo Tak-ui bidulgi habchang)	South Korea	Hong Sang-man; Kim Joo-in; Kim Dae-jung	Daewon Donghwa	Traditional	Television film		January 1, 1988	80 minutes
Doraemon: The Record of Nobita's Parallel Visit to the West ドラえもん のび太のパラレル西遊記 (Doraemon: Nobita no Parareru saiyûki)	Japan	Tsutomu Shibayama	Asatsu; Toho (distributor)	Traditional	Theatrical		March 12, 1988	90 minutes
Dragon Ball: Mystical Adventure ドラゴンボール 魔訶不思議大冒険 (Doragon Bōru: Makafushigi Dai-Bōken)	Japan	Kazuhisa Takenouchi	Toei Animation	Traditional	Theatrical		July 9, 1988	46 minutes
ESPer Mami: Hoshizora no Dancing Doll エスパー魔美 星空のダンシングドール (ESPer Mami: Dancing Doll in a Starry Sky)	Japan	Keiichi Hara	Shin-Ei Animation	Traditional	Theatrical		March 12, 1988	41 minutes
Felix the Cat: The Movie	United States; Hungary; Germany	Tibor Hernádi	New World Pictures; Felix the Cat Creations; Animation Film Cologne; Pannónia Filmstúdió	Traditional	Theatrical		October 1, 1988	78 minutes
Forget Me Not; Nefelejcs	Hungary	Elek Lisziák; György Kovásznai	Pannónia Filmstúdió	Traditional	Theatrical			
Gall Force 3: Stardust War ガルフォース3 スターダスト・ウォー	Japan	Katsuhito Akiyama	Artmic; AIC	Traditional	Direct-to-video; OVA		November 2, 1988	60 minutes
Garfield: His 9 Lives	United States	Phil Roman; Doug Frankel; Ruth Kissane; Bill Littlejohn; Bob Nesler; Bob Scott; George Singer; John Sparey	Film Roman	Traditional/Live action	Television special		November 22, 1988	48 minutes
The Good, the Bad, and Huckleberry Hound	United States	Ray Patterson; Bob Goe; John Kimball; Charles A. Nichols; Jay Sarbry	Hanna-Barbera	Traditional	Television film	Sixth installment in the syndicated anthology film series Hanna-Barbera Superstars 10.	May 6, 1988	95 minutes
Grave of the Fireflies 火垂るの墓 (Hotaru no Haka)	Japan	Isao Takahata	Studio Ghibli	Traditional	Theatrical		April 16, 1988	89 minutes
Happy Birthday, Garfield	United States	Jim Davis	Paws, Inc.	Traditional; Live action	Television special Live-action animated film		May 17, 1988	48 minutes
Harbor Light Story -From Fashion Lara- ハーバーライト物語（ストーリー） ―ファッション ララより― (Harbor Light Monogatari (Story) – Fashion Lala Yori)	Japan	Motosuke Takahashi; Hiroyuki Yokoyama (unit director)	Pierrot	Traditional	Direct-to-video; OVA		March 11, 1988	48 minutes
Hiatari Ryōkō! Ka – su – mi: Yume no Naka ni Kimi ga Ita 陽あたり良好！ KA・SU・MI: 夢の中に君がいた (Good Sunshine! KA・SU・MI: You Were There in a Dream)	Japan	Kimiharu Oguma	Toho; Group TAC	Traditional	Theatrical		October 1, 1988	67 minutes
Hiawatha	Australia		Burbank Films Australia	Traditional	Television film		June 15, 1988	50 minutes
It's the Girl in the Red Truck, Charlie Brown	United States	Sam Jaimes	Charles M. Schulz Creative Associates	Traditional/Live action	Television special Live-action animated film	Fifth hour-long Peanuts special.	September 27, 1988	50 minutes
Katy Meets the Aliens a. k. a. Katy and the Katerpillar Kids; Katy, Kiki y Koko	Mexico	José Luis Moro; Santiago Moro	Televicine S.A. de C.V. Moro Studios	Traditional	Theatrical	Sequel to Katy, La Oruga (1984).	June 23, 1988	70 minutes
Kimagure Orange Road: I Want to Return to That Day きまぐれオレンジ★ロード あの日にかえりたい (Kimagure Orange Road: Ano Hi ni Kaeritai)	Japan	Tomomi Mochizuki	Toho (distributor); Studio Pierrot	Traditional	Theatrical		October 1, 1988	69 minutes
Kosuke and Rikimaru: Dragon of Konpei Island 小助さま力丸さま -コンペイ島の竜- (Kosuke-sama, Rikimaru-sama: Konpeitō no Ryū)	Japan	Toyoo Ashida	J.C. Staff	Traditional	Direct-to-video; OVA		September 23, 1988	47 minutes
The Land Before Time	Ireland; United States	Don Bluth	Sullivan Bluth Studios	Traditional	Theatrical		November 18, 1988	69 minutes
Legend of the Galactic Heroes: My Conquest is the Sea of Stars 銀河英雄伝説 わが征くは星の大海 (Ginga Eiyū Densetsu: Waga Yuku wa Hoshi no Taikai )	Japan	Noboru Ishiguro	Madhouse; Artland	Traditional	Theatrical		February 6, 1988	60 minutes
Les Misérables	Ireland	Al Guest; Jean Mathieson	Emerald City Productions; D.L. Taffner	Traditional	Television film		December 16, 1988	60 minutes
Lovely Fatma; Göyçək Fatma	Soviet Union	Nazim Mammadov	Azerbaijanfilm	Traditional/Cutout	Theatrical		?	46 minutes
Maison Ikkoku: The Final Chapter めぞん一刻 完結篇 (Mezon Ikkoku: Kanketsuhen)	Japan	Tomomi Mochizuki	Ajia-do Animation Works	Traditional	Television film		February 6, 1988	66 minutes
Maison Ikkoku: Through the Passing of the Seasons めぞん一刻~移りゆく季節の中で~ (Maison Ikkoku: Utsuriyuku Kisetsu no Naka de)	Japan	Naoyuki Yoshinaga	Kitty Film	Traditional	Direct-to-video; OVA		September 25, 1988	90 minutes
Mobile Suit Gundam: Char's Counterattack 機動戦士ガンダム 逆襲のシャア (Kidō Senshi Gandamu: Gyakushū no Shā)	Japan	Yoshiyuki Tomino	Sunrise	Traditional	Theatrical		March 12, 1988	125 minutes
Monica's Gang and the Magic Star; Turma da Mônica e a Estrelinha Mágica	Brazil	Mauricio de Sousa	Estudios Maurício de Souza; Embrafilme (distributor)	Traditional	Theatrical		December 24, 1988	58 minutes
My Neighbor Totoro となりのトトロ (Tonari no Totoro)	Japan	Hayao Miyazaki	Studio Ghibli	Traditional	Theatrical		April 16, 1988	86 minutes
Novăceștii	Romania	Constantin Păun	Animafilm; Româniafilm (distributor)	Traditional	Theatrical		September 12, 1988	75 minutes
Oliver & Company	United States	George Scribner	Walt Disney Feature Animation; Silver Screen Partners III	Traditional	Theatrical		November 18, 1988	74 minutes
The Olympic Challenge 아리수변의 꿈나무 (Arisubyeon-ui Kkumnamu)	Korea	Kim Joo-in	Shinwon Production; KBS (distributor)	Traditional	Television film		September 25, 1988	75 minutes
One-Pound Gospel; 1ポンドの福音 (Ichi-Pondo no Fukuin)	Japan	Makura Saki	Studio Gallop	Traditional	Direct-to-video; OVA		December 2, 1988	55 minutes
Peter Pan	Australia	David Cherkasskiy; Richard Trueblood	Burbank Films Australia	Traditional	Television film		June 23, 1988	46 minutes
The Phantom of the Opera	Ireland	Al Guest; Jean Mathieson	Emerald City Productions; D.L. Taffner	Traditional	Television film		May 3, 1988	60 minutes
Popol Vuh: The Creation Myth of the Maya	United States	Patricia Amlin	?	?	Experimental		?	60 minutes
Pound Puppies and the Legend of Big Paw	United States	Pierre DeCelles	Carolco Pictures; Atlantic/Kushner-Locke; The Maltese Companies; Cuckoo's Nest Studio; Wang Film Productions; Tonka	Traditional	Theatrical		March 18, 1988	78 minutes
Prisoner of Zenda	Australia	Warwick Gilbert	Burbank Films Australia	Traditional	Television film		May 9, 1988	48 minutes
Project A-ko 3: Cinderella Rhapsody プロジェクトA子3 シンデレララプソディ (Purojekuto A-ko 3: Shinderera Rapusodi)	Japan	Yuji Moriyama	Pony Canyon; Soeishinsha; A.P.P.P. Studio Fantasia	Traditional	Direct-to-video; OVA		June 20, 1988	46 minutes
Raining Fire 火の雨がふる (Hi no Ame ga Furu)	Japan	Seiji Arihara	Nikkatsu Children's Movie; Mushi Production; Space Eizo	Traditional	Theatrical		September 15, 1988	80 minutes
Robotech II: The Sentinels	United States; Japan	Carl Macek	Harmony Gold USA (distributor); Tatsunoko Productions	Traditional	Direct-to-video; Compilation film		September 1988	75 minutes
Rockin' with Judy Jetson	United States	Paul Sommer	Hanna-Barbera Productions	Traditional	Television film	Seventh installment in the syndicated anthology film series Hanna-Barbera Superstars 10.	September 18, 1988	92 minutes
Ryūko, the Girl with the White Flag 白旗の少女 琉子 (Shirahata no Shōjo Ryūko)	Japan	Satoshi Dezaki	Magic Bus	Traditional	Theatrical		July 21, 1988	101 minutes
Saint Seiya: The Heated Battle of the Gods 聖闘士星矢 神々の熱き戦い (Seinto Seiya: Kamigami no Atsuki Tatakai)	Japan	Shigeyasu Yamauchi	Toei Animation	Traditional	Theatrical		March 12, 1988	45 minutes
Saint Seiya: Legend of Crimson Youth 聖闘士星矢 真紅の少年伝説 (Seinto Seiya: Shinku no Shōnen Densetsu)	Japan	Shigeyasu Yamauchi	Toei Animation	Traditional	Theatrical		July 23, 1988	75 minutes
Sakigake!! Otokojuku 魁!!男塾 (Charge!! Men's Private School)	Japan	Nobutaka Nishizawa	Toei Animation	Traditional	Theatrical		July 23, 1988	71 minutes
Scooby-Doo and the Ghoul School	United States; Taiwan	Charles A. Nichols	Hanna-Barbera Productions; Wang Film Productions	Traditional	Television film	Eighth installment in the syndicated anthology film series Hanna-Barbera Superstars 10.	October 16, 1988	92 minutes
Scooby-Doo and the Reluctant Werewolf	United States	Ray Patterson	Hanna-Barbera Productions	Traditional	Television film	Ninth installment in the syndicated anthology film series Hanna-Barbera Superstars 10.	November 13, 1988	91 minutes
The Séance Table; La Table tournante	France	Paul Grimault; Jacques Demy	Les Films Paul Grimault; La Sept; Centre National du Cinéma et de l'Image Animée	Traditional/Live action	Compilation film		December 21, 1988	80 minutes
Snoopy! The Musical	United States	Sam Jaimes	Charles M. Schulz Creative Associates; United Media Productions; Mendelson-Melendez Productions	Traditional	Television special	Fourth hour-long Peanuts special.	January 29, 1988	50 minutes
The Son of the Stars; Fiul stelelor	Romania	Mircea Toia	Animafilm; Româniafilm (distributor)	Traditional	Theatrical		October 17, 1988	78 minutes
Stowaways on the Ark; In der Arche ist der Wurm drin (The Worm Is in the Ark)	West Germany	Wolfgang Urchs	MS-Films; Paramount Filmproduction GmbH; Artemis Film; Zweites Deutsches Fernsehen (ZDF)	Traditional	Theatrical		March 24, 1988	81 minutes
The Three Mouseketeers; Uimitoarele aventuri ale Muschetarilor (The Amazing Adventures of the Musketeers)	Romania	Victor Antonescu	Animafilm	Traditional	Theatrical		April 11, 1988	81 minutes
The Tokyo Project トウキョウ・バイス (Tokyo Vice)	Japan	Osamu Yamasaki	Minamimachi Bugyosho Co., Ltd. MTV; Polydor	Traditional	Direct-to-video; OVA		June 25, 1988	60 minutes
Top Cat and the Beverly Hills Cats	United States	Ray Patterson; Paul Sommer; Charles A. Nichols	Hanna-Barbera Productions	Traditional	Television film	Fifth installment in the syndicated anthology film series Hanna-Barbera Superstars 10.	March 20, 1988	92 minutes
Toyama Sakura Space Book – His Name is Gold 遠山桜宇宙帖・奴の名はゴールド (Tooyama Sakura Uchū Chō – Yatsu no Na wa Gold)	Japan	Atsutoshi Umezawa	Toei Animation; Tokuma Shoten; Tokuma Japan	Traditional	Direct-to-video; OVA		June 1988	59 minutes
Treasure Island; Остров сокровищ (Ostrov sokrovishch)	Ukraine	David Cherkassky	Kievnauchfilm	Traditional/Live action	?		March 24, 1989	107 minutes
Ultimate Teacher 恐怖のバイオ人間 最終教師 (Kyōfun no Bio-Ningen – Saishū Kyōshi)	Japan	Toyoo Ashida	J.C.Staff	Traditional	Direct-to-video; OVA		February 6, 1988	60 minutes
Urusei Yatsura: The Final Chapter うる星やつら 完結篇 うる星やつら 完結篇 (Urusei Yatsura: Kanketsuhen)	Japan	Tetsu Dezaki	Magic Bus	Traditional	Theatrical	Fifth feature in the Urusei Yatsura film series.	February 6, 1988	86 minutes
Violence Jack: Evil Town バイオレンス ジャック 〜地獄街編〜 (Baiorensu Jakku: Jigokugai)	Japan	Ichiro Itano	Soei Shinsha; Japan Home Video; Studio88	Traditional	Direct-to-video; OVA		December 21, 1988	60 minutes
Watt Poe and Our Story ワット・ポーとぼくらのお話 (Watt Poe to Bokura no Ohanashi)	Japan	Shigenori Kageyama	Diva; Konami; Pony Canyon; Kaname Production	Traditional	Direct-to-video; OVA		August 12, 1988	55 minutes
Westward Ho!	Australia	Geoff Collins; Alex Nicholas	Burbank Films Australia	Traditional	Television film		May 1, 1988	55 minutes
What's Michael? 2 ホワッツマイケル? 2 (Howattsu Maikeru? 2)	Japan	Yoriyasu Kogawa	Kitty Films	Traditional	Direct-to-video; OVA		July 25, 1988	60 minutes
Who Framed Roger Rabbit	United States	Robert Zemeckis Richard Williams (animation)	Touchstone Pictures; Amblin Entertainment; Silver Screen Partners III; Walt Disney Feature Animation	Traditional/Live action	Theatrical; Live-action animated film	First feature film to have live action and animated cartoons share the screen for the entire film.	June 22, 1988	104 minutes
Wind in the Willows	Australia	Geoff Collins	Burbank Films Australia	Traditional	Television film		December 13, 1988	50 minutes
The Wings of a Magpie 까치의 날개 (Kkachi ae Nalgae)	Korea	Lee Hyeon-se	Daewon Donghwa; Korean Broadcasting System (distributor)	Traditional	Television special	Sequel to The Wandering Magpie (1987).	January 2, 1988	80 minutes
Xanadu: The Legend of Dragon Slayer ザナドゥ・ドラゴンスレイヤー伝説 (Xanadu: Doragon Sureiyā Densetsu)	Japan	Atsutoshi Umezawa	Kadokawa Shoten; Mainichi Broadcasting System; Toei Animation	Traditional	Direct-to-video; OVA	OVA film based on the video game Xanadu (1987), the second installment in the Dragon Slayer series.	March 1, 1988	50 minutes
Yogi and the Invasion of the Space Bears	United States	Don Lusk	Hanna-Barbera	Traditional	Television film	Tenth and final installment in the syndicated anthology film series Hanna-Barbera Superstars 10.	November 20, 1988	90 minutes
Yōsei-Ō 妖精王 (Fairy King)	Japan	Katsuhisa Yamada	CBS/Sony Group Inc. Kadokawa Shoten; Madhouse	Traditional	Direct-to-video; OVA		December 21, 1988	60 minutes
Zillion: Burning Night 赤い光弾ジリオン 歌姫夜曲 (Akai Kodan Zillion Utahime Yakyoku)	Japan	Mizuho Nishikubo	Tatsunoko; Production I.G.	Traditional	Direct-to-video; OVA		June 21, 1988	45 minutes

== Highest-grossing animated films of the year ==
Rank	Title	Studio	Worldwide gross	Ref.
1	Oliver & Company	Walt Disney Feature Animation	$100,000,000	
2	The Land Before Time	Sullivan Bluth Studios / Amblin Entertainment / Universal Studios	$84,460,846	
3	Akira	Tokyo Movie Shinsha / Akira Committee / Toho	$49,000,000	
4	My Neighbor Totoro	Studio Ghibli	$42,000,000	
5	Doraemon: The Record of Nobita's Parallel Visit to the West	Asatsu / Toho	$12,100,000 (¥1.36 billion)	
6	Dragon Ball: Mystical Adventure	Toei Animation	$7,700,000 (¥1.02 billion)	
7	Grave of the Fireflies	Studio Ghibli	$4,707,975 (¥1.7 billion)	

== See also ==
- List of animated television series of 1988
