= List of animated television series of 1988 =

A list of animated television series first aired in 1988.

Animated television series first aired in 1988
| Title | Seasons | Episodes | Country | Year | Original Channel | Technique |
|---|---|---|---|---|---|---|
| The Adventures of Raggedy Ann and Andy | 1 | 13 | United States | 1988 | CBS | Traditional |
| ALF Tales | 2 | 21 | United States | 1988–89 | NBC | Traditional |
| Barney | 1 | 13 | United Kingdom | 1988–89 | BBC One | Traditional |
| Benjamin the Elephant | 3 | 69 | Germany | 1988–2003 | ZDF | Traditional |
| Bobobobs | 2 | 26 | Spain | 1988–89 | TV3 | Traditional |
| Charlie Chalk | 1 | 13 | United Kingdom | 1988–89 | BBC1 | Stop-Motion |
| Charlotte, Fléo et Benjamin | 1 | 52 | France | 1988 | Canal+ | Traditional |
| Clifford the Big Red Dog | 1 | 6 | Canada; United States | 1988 | Syndication | Traditional |
| The Completely Mental Misadventures of Ed Grimley | 1 | 13 | United States | 1988 | NBC | Traditional/Live-action |
| Les Contes Magiques | 1 | 15 | France | 1988 | FR3 | Traditional |
| COPS | 1 | 65 | United States; Canada | 1988 | Syndication | Traditional |
| Count Duckula | 4 | 65 | United Kingdom | 1988–93 | ITV | Traditional |
| Denver, the Last Dinosaur | 2 | 50 | United States; France | 1988–90 | Syndication; FR3 | Traditional |
| Dino-Riders | 1 | 14 | United States | 1988 | Syndication | Traditional |
| Fantastic Max | 2 | 26 | United States; United Kingdom; Wales | 1988–90 | S4C; BBC1; Syndication | Traditional |
| Garbage Pail Kids | 1 | 13 | United States | 1988 | CBS | Traditional |
| Garfield and Friends | 7 | 121 | United States | 1988–94 | CBS | Traditional |
| Gumby Adventures | 1 | 104 | United States | 1988 | Syndication | Stop-Motion |
| Marvel Action Universe | 1 | 12 | United States | 1988 | Syndication | Traditional |
| Naftaline | 1 | 52 | France | 1988 | FR3 | Traditional |
| The New Adventures of Beany and Cecil | 1 | 8 | United States | 1988 | ABC | Traditional |
| The New Adventures of Winnie the Pooh | 4 | 50 | United States | 1988–91 | The Disney Channel (1988); ABC (1988–91) | Traditional |
| The New Yogi Bear Show | 1 | 45 | United States | 1988 | Syndication | Traditional |
| Non Non Non et Non | 1 | 26 | Canada; France | 1988 | Antenne 2 | |
| Philipp Spots | 1 | 104 | France | 1988 | Antenne 2 | Traditional |
| Police Academy | 2 | 65 | United States; Canada | 1988–89 | Syndication | Traditional |
| A Pup Named Scooby-Doo | 4 | 27 | United States | 1988–91 | ABC | Traditional |
| The Ratties | 1 | 26 | United Kingdom | 1988 | ITV | Traditional |
| RoboCop | 1 | 12 | United States | 1988 | Syndication | Traditional |
| Robotech II: The Sentinels | 1 | 3 | United States; Japan | 1988 | Syndication | Traditional |
| Run Hany | 1 | 13 | South Korea | 1988 | KBS2 | Traditional |
| Satellite City | 1 | 18 | United Kingdom | 1988 | CITV | Traditional |
| Stoppit and Tidyup | 1 | 13 | United Kingdom | 1988 | BBC One | Traditional |
| Stories of the Sylvanian Families | 1 | 4 | United Kingdom | 1988 | Direct-to-video | Stop-Motion |
| Superman | 1 | 13 | United States | 1988 | CBS | Traditional |
| This Is America, Charlie Brown | 1 | 8 | United States | 1988–89 | CBS | Traditional |
| Tube Mice | 1 | 26 | United Kingdom | 1988 | ITV | Traditional |
| La Vie des Bêtes | 1 | 41 | France | 1988 | Canal+ | CGI |
| Virgul | 1 | 156 | France | 1988 | Canal+ | Traditional |

Anime television series first aired in 1988

| Title | Seasons | Episodes | Country | Year | Original Channel | Notes |
|---|---|---|---|---|---|---|
| The Burning Wild Man | | 24 | Japan | 1988 | Nippon TV | |
| City Hunter 2 | | 63 | Japan | 1988–89 | | |
| Dagon in the Land of Weeds | | 12 | Japan | 1988 | ANN | |
| F | | 31 | Japan | 1988 | | |
| Hello! Lady Lynn | | 36 | Japan | 1988–89 | TXN | |
| Himitsu no Akko-chan | | 61 | Japan | 1988–89 | | |
| Ironfist Chinmi | | 20 | Japan | 1988 | | |
| Kiteretsu Daihyakka | | 331 | Japan | 1988–96 | FNS | |
| Little Lord Fauntleroy | | 43 | Japan | 1988 | | |
| Mashin Hero Wataru | | 45 | Japan | 1988–89 | | |
| New Grimm's Fairy Tale Classics | | 23 | Japan | 1988–89 | | |
| Oishinbo | | 136 | Japan | 1988–92 | | |
| Osomatsu-kun | | 86 | Japan | 1988–89 | | |
| Ronin Warriors | | 39 | Japan | 1988–89 | | |
| Sakigake!! Otokojuku | | 34 | Japan | 1988 | | |
| Sonic Soldier Borgman | | 35 | Japan | 1988 | | |
| Soreike! Anpanman | | 1617+ | Japan | 1988–present | | |
| Tatakae!! Ramenman | | 35 | Japan | 1988 | | |
| Topo Gigio | | 34 | Japan | 1988 | | |
| Transformers: Super-God Masterforce | | 43 | Japan | 1988–89 | | |
| Tsurupika Hagemaru | | 59 | Japan | 1988–89 | | |
| What's Michael? | | 45 | Japan; France | 1988–89 | | |
| Wowser | | 52 | Japan | 1988–89 | | |

== See also ==
- List of animated feature films of 1988
- List of Japanese animation television series of 1988
