= Pat Musick =

American voice actress

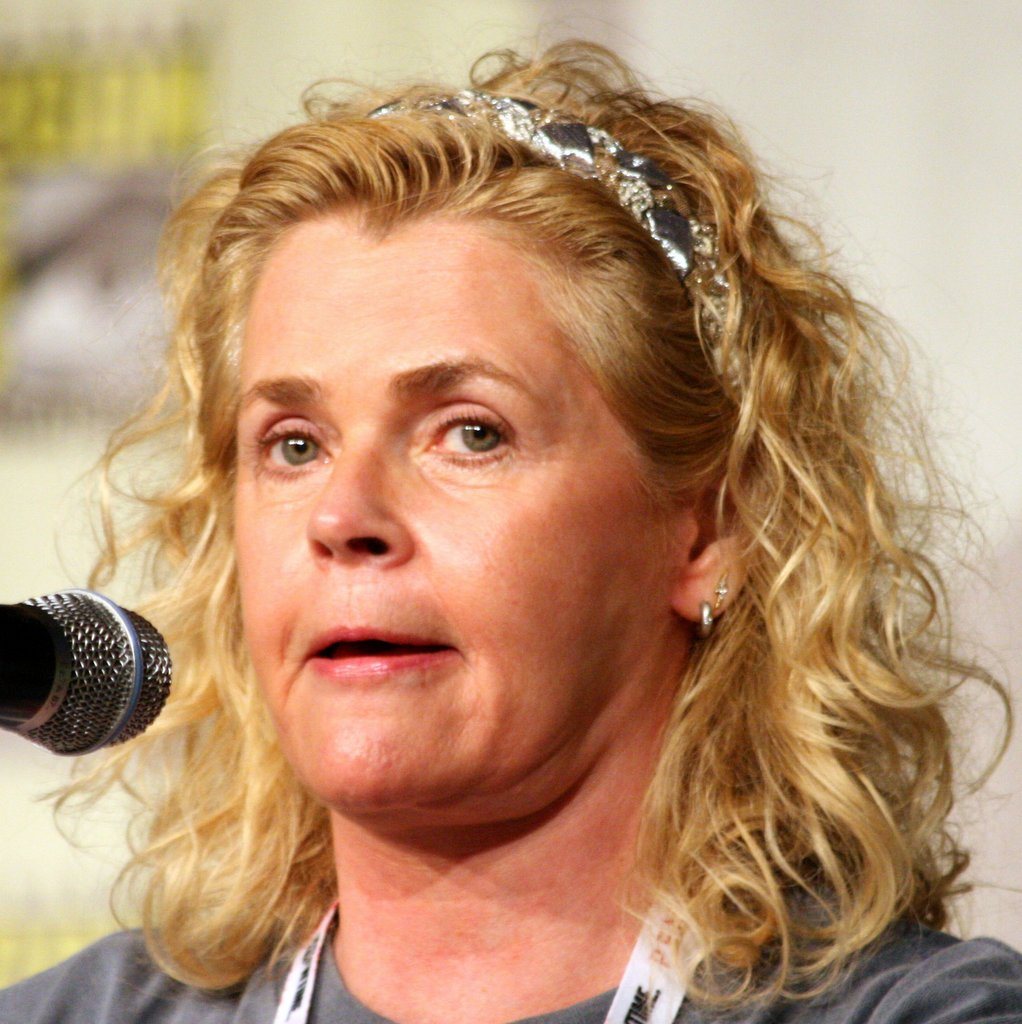
- Musick at San Diego Comic-Con in 2015.
- Born: Patricia Anne Musick; St. Louis, Missouri, U.S.
- Occupation: Voice actress
- Years active: 1981–present
- Spouse: Jeff Whitman (m. 1983)
- Children: Mae Whitman

Patricia Anne Musick is an American voice actress who has provided numerous voices in many television shows, films, and video games.

== Early life ==
Musick was born Patricia Anne Musick in St. Louis, Missouri to Jane (née Maginnis) and Donn Musick. She has one brother and one sister.

== Career ==
Musick’s first role was in the 1981 film The Loch Ness Horror. Her roles in animation include Snappy Smurfling in The Smurfs and Harold Frumpkin in Rugrats.

Musick additionally voiced Tony Toponi in the An American Tail franchise, basing his voice on a friend she knew from grade school. In the early 1990s, Musick was unable to reprise the role, taking time to raise her daughter, Mae Whitman, who was born in 1988, causing the use of her character to be limited in the first sequel and completely unused in Fievel's American Tails until the direct-to-video sequels in the late 1990s.

== Personal life ==
Musick married personal manager and set construction coordinator Jeff Whitman in 1983. They have one daughter, actress and singer Mae Whitman. As of August 2024, Musick and her husband have one grandson through her daughter.

== Filmography ==
=== Television ===
Year	Title	Role	Notes
1984–1989	The Smurfs	Snappy Smurf	92 episodes
1987	DuckTales	Bully Beagle, Empire	2 episodes
1987–1988	Saber Rider and the Star Sheriffs	April Eagle, Tina	52 episodes
1988	Rockin' with Judy Jetson	Fanclub Member, Starr, Zowie	Television film
1988	Scooby-Doo and the Ghoul School	Elsa Frankenteen	Television film
1988	Scooby-Doo! and the Reluctant Werewolf	Vanna Pira	Television film
1989–1991	Adventures of the Gummi Bears	Ursa Gummi	4 episodes
1990	Teenage Mutant Ninja Turtles	Mona Lisa	1 episode
1991	Darkwing Duck	Kid	Episode: "Cleanliness Is Next to Badliness"
1991	Space Cats	Dementia DeFortino	1 episode
1992–1993	Batman: The Animated Series	Stella Bates, Flight Attendant, Lab Technician	3 episodes
1993–2002	Rugrats	Edwin Carmichael, various voices	7 episodes
1994	Aaahh!!! Real Monsters	Gillybegs, Little Monsters	Episode: "Cold Hard Toenails"
1994–1997	Duckman	Charles, Fluffy, Uranus	Main cast
1994–1996	The Tick	Sally Vacuum, Bee Twins, Tunn-La, Mad Nanny	7 episodes
1995–1997	What a Cartoon!	Grandma	2 episodes
1995	The Sylvester & Tweety Mysteries	Mary Ann	Episode: "A Chip Off the Old Castle"
1997	Extreme Ghostbusters	Janine Melnitz	33 episodes
1997–1998	Pinky and the Brain	Scientist, Dutch Girl, TV Mom	3 episodes
1997–1998	Cow and Chicken	Various voices	2 episodes
1997–1999	Superman: The Animated Series	Mother, Guardian #2	2 episodes
1997–2001	Johnny Bravo	Various voices	7 episodes
1998–1999	Pinky, Elmyra & the Brain	Old Woman, Weasel	2 episodes
2001	Batman Beyond	Busybody	Episode: "Unmasked"
2001–2003	House of Mouse	Fiddler Pig, Gopher	3 episodes
2002	Oh Yeah! Cartoons	Ms. Hornbuckle	Episode: "The Boy Who Cried Alien"
2002	Static Shock	Mrs. Osgood	Episode: "Jimmy"
2002	Globehunters: An Around the World in 80 Days Adventure	Leopard, French Newswoman	Television film
2003–2008	All Grown Up!	Harold Frumpkin, additional voices	18 episodes
2005	Avatar: The Last Airbender	Haru's Mother	Episode: "Imprisoned"
2005	The Buzz on Maggie	Ugly Bug	Episode: "Love Stinks"
2005	Rugrats Pre-School Daze	Harold Frumpkin, Coffee Woman	4 episodes
2005	A.T.O.M.	Momma Rossi	Episode: "Royal Rumble"
2006	The Life and Times of Juniper Lee	Eloise	Episode: "Food for Naught"
2007–2012	Curious George	Mrs. Klopotznick, Mrs. Dewey, Old Woman, Little Girl	4 episodes
2009	Back at the Barnyard	Woman	Episode: "Back at the Booyard"
2009	Batman: The Brave and the Bold	Martha Wayne	Episode: "Dawn of the Dead Man!"
2012	ThunderCats	Aldo	Episode: "The Forever Bag"
2017	New Looney Tunes	Deer, Poll Worker	Episode: "Bugs for Mayor"
2018	OK K.O.! Let's Be Heroes	Elsa Frankenteen	Episode: "Monster Party"

=== Film ===
Year	Title	Role	Notes
1982	The Loch Ness Horror	Ms. Stowall	
1986	An American Tail	Tony Toponi	
1994	Thumbelina	Mrs. Rabbit	
1994	A Troll in Central Park	Snuffy	
1995	The Pebble and the Penguin	Pola, Chinstrap Penguin	
1998	An American Tail: The Treasure of Manhattan Island	Tony Toponi	
1999	Mickey's Once Upon a Christmas	Mrs. Anderson, Eccentric Lady, Angry Woman	
1999	An American Tail: The Mystery of the Night Monster	Tony Toponi	
2000	It's the Pied Piper, Charlie Brown	First Lady	Direct-to-video
2011	Batman: Year One	Louisa Falcone	Direct-to-video
2014	Mr. Peabody & Sherman	Teacher	

=== Video games ===
Year	Title	Role	Notes
1995	Full Throttle	Miranda Wood	
1996	Mortimer and the Riddles of the Medallion	Giraffe, Flying Squirrel, Timberland Gate	
2013	DuckTales: Remastered	Computer Voice	
