= Hamilton Camp =

British actor (1934–2005)

- Camp in the only aired episode of Turn-On in 1969
- Born: Robin S. Camp; 30 October 1934; London, England
- Died: 2 October 2005 (aged 70); Los Angeles, California, U.S.
- Other names: Bob Camp; Hamid Hamilton Camp
- Occupations: Actor; singer
- Years active: 1946–2005
- Spouse: Rasjadah Camp (m. 1961; died 2002)
- Children: 6
- Musical career
- Genres: Folk; electronic
- Instrument: Vocals
- Label: Elektra Records
- Website: hamiltoncamp.com

Hamilton Camp (born Robin S. Camp; 30 October 1934 – 2 October 2005) was a British actor and singer, who relocated to the United States with his family when he was a young child. He is known for his work as a folk singer during the 1960s, and eventually branched out into acting in films and television.

== Early life ==
Camp was born in London and was evacuated during World War II to the United States as a child with his mother and sister. He became a child actor in films and onstage. He originally performed under the names Robin Camp and Bob Camp, later changing his name to Hamilton after joining the Subud spiritual movement. For a few years, he billed himself as Hamid Hamilton Camp; in this period, he was leader of a group called Skymonters that released an album in 1973 on Elektra. The band consisted of himself (vocals, guitar), Lewis Arquette (vocals, comedy monologues), Lewis Ross (lead guitar), Jakub Ander (bass) and Rusdi Lane (percussionist & mime).

== Career ==
Hamilton Camp began his acting career in 1946, at 12 years old.

In 1960, Camp made his debut as a folk singer at the Newport Folk Festival. In 1961, Camp's first recording, with Bob Gibson, was Bob Gibson & Bob Camp at the Gate of Horn. Over the next four decades he maintained a dual career as a musician/songwriter and as an actor. Camp is probably best known, however, as the author of the 1964 song "Pride of Man", which was recorded by a number of artists, notably Quicksilver Messenger Service, Gram Parsons, and Gordon Lightfoot, who included it as one of three songs by other songwriters on his first record.

In 1964, Camp made his Broadway debut in the musical revue The Committee.

An early Gibson & Camp gospel song, "You Can Tell the World" was the opening track on Simon & Garfunkel's first album, Wednesday Morning, 3 A.M. As a singer, Camp had a minor hit with the song "Here's to You," which peaked at number 76 on the Billboard Hot 100 in 1968. The track was produced and arranged by Felix Pappalardi, who also produced albums for Cream and played bass with the band Mountain.

In 1969 Camp formed a group called The True Brethren with Waqidi Falicoff (guitar, vocals), Raphael Grinage (cello) and Loren Pickford (flute and saxophone). The four later composed the incidental music for the Broadway show Paul Sills' Story Theatre, which won two Tony awards and was nominated for best show in the 1971 awards.

He provided voice work as "L" the robot policeman in the 1978 film Starcrash and for the 1976 Peter Bogdanovich film Nickelodeon. He also performed with the Chicago comedy troupe The Second City and the San Francisco satirical comedy troupe the Committee, as well as appearing in a number of stage productions, including a 2004 production of A Midsummer Night's Dream at the Hollywood Bowl.

His television work includes a supporting role on He & She, a sitcom starring Richard Benjamin and Paula Prentiss, which ran for one season in 1967–68. He guest-starred on television shows such as The Rat Patrol, The Monkees, M*A*S*H, Soap, The Mary Tyler Moore Show, The Twilight Zone, Starsky and Hutch, Cheers, The Andy Griffith Show, Bewitched, Gomer Pyle, U.S.M.C., Three's Company and Lois & Clark: The New Adventures of Superman, as the older H. G. Wells. He appeared on two episodes of Star Trek: Deep Space Nine as Leck, a Ferengi and on one episode of Star Trek: Voyager as a Malon freighter pilot.

In 1977, Camp appeared in three episodes of The Feather and Father Gang. In the 1978 opening season of WKRP in Cincinnati, Camp guest-starred in the fifth episode as Del Murdock, owner of Del's Stereo and Sound. He returned to WKRP as Johnny Fever's ex-wife's new fiancé. Also in 1978, he played Warren Beatty's valet, Bentley, in Heaven Can Wait. In 1980, he appeared as a semi-regular on Too Close for Comfort as Arthur Wainwright, the adventurous, youth-oriented boss of Henry Rush, and on the FOX sitcom Titus as Erin Fitzpatrick's alcoholic father, Merritt. He played Bart Furley, brother of Don Knotts' character Ralph Furley, on an episode of Three's Company, "Furley vs. Furley". He also voiced Professor Moriarty in the English dub of the anime series Sherlock Hound.

He was the voice of Fenton Crackshell, aka GizmoDuck, on the Disney animated series DuckTales and its spinoff Darkwing Duck. He played the role of old Malcolm Corley in LucasArts' graphic adventure Full Throttle. He voiced the Prophet of Mercy in the 2004 video game Halo 2.

He became Disney Studio's new voice of Merlin, following the death of Karl Swenson. Camp also voiced for Hanna–Barbera; as Greedy Smurf and Harmony Smurf on The Smurfs series and all of HB's Smurf television specials, Count Dracula in Scooby-Doo and the Reluctant Werewolf, Turk Tarpit in The Jetsons Meet the Flintstones, Mr. Gruber in Paddington Bear, The Grand Dozer on Potsworth & Co., several villains of the week from A Pup Named Scooby-Doo and Barney Rubble as a kid in The Flintstone Kids. Camp's final work was on the film Hard Four in early 2005, as well as a musical album produced by James Lee Stanley called Sweet Joy, completed shortly before his death.

== Personal life and death ==
He married Rasjadah Lisa Jovita Cisz in 1961, and they had six children. His wife died in 2002.

Camp died of a heart attack on October 2, 2005, at age 70. He was survived by his six children and thirteen grandchildren.

== Filmography ==
- Bedlam (1946) as Pompey (voice, uncredited)
- Mrs. Mike (1949) as Tommy Howard
- The Happy Years (1950) as Butch Sidney (uncredited)
- Outrage (1950) as Shoeshine Boy
- Dark City (1950) as Bobby – Boy (uncredited)
- Kim (1950) as Thorpe (uncredited)
- When I Grow Up (1951) as Bully
- The Son of Dr. Jekyll (1951) as William Bennett (uncredited)
- Week-End with Father (1951) as Pianist (uncredited)
- My Cousin Rachel (1952) as Philip – Age 15 (uncredited)
- Titanic (1953) as Messenger Boy (uncredited)
- Ride Clear of Diablo (1954) as Andrew O'Mara (uncredited)
- Executive Suite (1954) as Roger Ingoldsby
- The Black Shield of Falworth (1954) as Organ Grinder (uncredited)
- Mardi Gras (1958) as Organ Grinder (uncredited)
- Too Tough to Care (1964) as Otto, a psychologist at a cigarette company
- The Perils of Pauline (1967) as Thorpe
- The Graduate (1967) as Second room clerk (uncredited)
- The Monkees (1967) – Philo in S1:E31, "Monkees in the Movies"
- Cockeyed Cowboys of Calico County (1970) as Mr. George Fowler
- Nickelodeon (1976) as Blacker
- Alice (American TV series) (1977) as Fred
- Smokey and the Bandit (1977) as a state trooper.
- American Hot Wax (1978) as Louie Morgan
- Rabbit Test (1978) as Misha
- Heaven Can Wait (1978) as Bentley
- Starcrash (1978) as Elle (English version, voice)
- M*A*S*H (1978) as Corporal “Boots” Miller
- Soap (1980) as Elmore Tibbs
- Roadie (1980) as Grady
- All Night Long (1981) as Buggoms
- SOB (1981) as Mr. Lipschitz
- Too Close For Comfort (1981) as Arthur Wainwright
- Three's Company (1981) as Bart Furley
- The Smurfs (1981–1989) as Greedy Smurf / Harmony Smurf (voice)
- Evilspeak (1981) as Hauptman
- Eating Raoul (1982) as John Peck – Dishonest Wine Buyer
- M*A*S*H (1982) as Frankenheimer
- Safari 3000 (1982) as Feodor
- Young Doctors in Love (1982) as The Others – Oscar Katz
- The Incredible Hulk (1982–1983) as Dr. Brandon Jones (voice)
- Twice Upon a Time (1983) as Greensleeves (voice)
- ABC Weekend Specials (1983) as Sheriff / Little Green Man #1 / Butcher / Villager / Mushroom Harvester (voice)
- Under Fire (1983) as Regis Seydor
- Meatballs Part II (1984) as Col. Bat Jack Hershey
- The Rosebud Beach Hotel (1984) as Matches
- No Small Affair (1984) as Gus Sosnowski
- City Heat (1984) as Garage Attendant
- It Came Upon the Midnight Clear (1984) as Meek Angel
- The New Scooby-Doo Mysteries (1984) as Dracula / Sheldon Keats (voice)
- Sherlock Hound (1984–1985) as Professor Moriarty (voice)
- Pink Panther and Sons (1984) as Additional Voices
- The 13 Ghosts of Scooby-Doo (1985) as Rankor / Ghoulio (voice)
- CBS Storybreak (1985–1988) as Dr. Crabneckel (voice)
- The Flintstone Kids (1986–1988) as Barney Rubble / Flab Slab (voice)
- Foofur (1986–1988) as Additional Voices
- DuckTales (1987–1990) as Fenton Crackshell / Gizmoduck / Man in Soap Opera / Overlord Bulovan / Director / Cop #2 (voice)
- Yogi's Great Escape (1987) as Li'l Brother Bear (voice)
- Scooby-Doo Meets the Boo Brothers (1987) as Ghostly Laugh (voice, uncredited)
- The Jetsons Meet the Flintstones (1987) as Turk Tarpit (voice)
- Rockin' with Judy Jetson (1988, TV movie) as Mr. Microchips / Manny (voice)
- Scooby-Doo and the Ghoul School (1988, TV Movie) as Phantom Father (voice)
- Bird (1988) as Mayor of 52nd Street
- The Completely Mental Misadventures of Ed Grimley (1988) as Additional Voices
- The Flintstone Kids' Just Say No Special (1988) as Barney Rubble (voice)
- A Pup Named Scooby-Doo (1988) as Additional Voices / Mr. Dayton / Samurai Ghost (voice)
- Scooby-Doo! and the Reluctant Werewolf (1988, TV Movie) as Dracula (voice)
- Mama's Family (1989) as Dr. Bishop / Purvis (voice)
- Bridesmaids (1989) as Ridgefield
- Arena (1989) as Shorty
- The Further Adventures of SuperTed (1989) as Sparky
- Adventures of the Gummi Bears (1989–1991) as King Jean-Claude (voice)
- Betty Boop's Hollywood Mystery (1989) Maxwell Movieola (voice)
- The Little Mermaid (1989) as Additional Voices (voice)
- Paddington Bear (1989–1990) as Mr. Gruber (voice)
- Saved by the Bell (1989) as Mr. Margolies
- Dick Tracy (1990) as Store Clerk
- Chip 'n Dale: Rescue Rangers (1990, TV Series) as Mountie / Chief Beetlebreath (voice)
- Megaville (1990) as Dr. Skutnik
- Midnight Patrol: Adventures in the Dream Zone (1990) as The Grand Dozer (voice)
- TaleSpin (1990–1991) as Babyface Half Nelson / Police Officer / Seymore (voice)
- Tiny Toon Adventures (1990) as The Scottish Flea (voice)
- Gravedale High (1990) as Tucker (voice)
- The New Adventures of Winnie the Pooh (1991) as Grocery store clerk (voice)
- Darkwing Duck (1991) as Gizmoduck / Fenton Crackshell / Jock Newbody (voice)
- Space Cats (1991) as Incidental Characters (voice)
- The Pirates of Dark Water (1991) as Additional Voices (voice)
- Let's Kill All the Lawyers (1992) as Marcus
- Diner (1992) as A-1 (voice)
- Bobby's World (1992) as Uncle Lou (voice)
- The Wattersons (1992–2006, due to the memory of Hamilton Camp) as Hoppity Hooper / Additional Voices (voice)
- Attack of the 50 Ft. Woman (1993) as Prospector Eddie
- Bonkers (1993) as Pitts / TV commercial director (voice)
- Mighty Max (1993–1994) as Additional Voice (voice)
- Teenage Mutant Ninja Turtles (1990) as Jocko / Kevin Tyler / Dwayne (voice)
- The Tick (1994–1996) as Professor Chromedome / Benjamin Franklin / Guy with Ears Like Little Raisins (voice)
- Aladdin (1994–1995) as Ayam Aghoul (voice)
- The Pebble and the Penguin (1995) as Megellenic 2 (voice)
- Full Throttle (1995) as Malcolm Corley and Father Torque (voice)
- Gordy (1995) as Father Pig / Richard the Rooster (voice)
- The Twisted Adventures of Felix the Cat (1995–1996) as Voices / Mr. Monster / Mr. Whale
- All Dogs Go to Heaven 2 (1996) as Chihuahua (voice)
- Lois & Clark: The New Adventures of Superman (1996–1997) as H.G. Wells
- Life with Louie (1997) as Jen Glenn (voice)
- Adventures from the Book of Virtues (1997) as Swindler / The Servant (voice)
- Almost Heroes (1998) as Pratt
- Dr. Dolittle (1998) as Pig (voice)
- Star Trek: Voyager - episode Extreme Risk (1998)
- Joe Dirt (2001) as Meteor Bert
- The Zeta Project (2001) as Dr. Rashad
- House of Mouse (2001–2002) as Merlin (voice)
- Wishcraft (2002) as Chief Bates
- Dexter's Laboratory (2002) as Principal (voice)
- The 4th Tenor (2002) as Papa
- Out of Order (2003) as Hamster / Plant (voice)
- Brave: The Search for Spirit Dancer (2005, video game) as Grey Bear (voice)
- The Grim Adventures of Billy & Mandy (2006) as Country Dirt Grome / Man (voice, posthumous release)
- Hard Four (2007) as Bix Karew (final film role, posthumous release)

== Discography ==
Albums

- Bob Gibson and Bob Camp at the Gate of Horn (1961, Rhino)
- Paths of Victory (1964, Collectors' Choice Music)
- Here's to You (1967, Warner Brothers Music)
- Welcome to Hamilton Camp (1967, Warner Brothers Music)
- Skymonters With Hamid Hamilton Camp at AllMusic (1973, Elektra)
- Rumpelstiltskin: A Folktale by Edith H. Tarcov (1973, Scholastic Records)
- Homemade Music (Bob Gibson and Hamilton Camp) at AllMusic (1978, Mountain Railroad Records)
- Mardi's Bard (2003, DJC)
- Sweet Joy (2005, Beachwood)

=== Singles ===
Songs

- "Here's to You" (1968, Warner Brothers - Seven Arts; written by Hamilton Camp)
- "This Wheel's On Fire" (1968, Warner Brothers; written by Bob Dylan)
- "Oklahoma City Times" (1969, Warner Brothers - Seven Arts; written by Paul Hamilton)
- "Didn't I Turn Out Nice" (1970, American International Records; written by Dory Previn)
- "Gypsy" (Skmonters with Hamid Hamilton Camp; 1974, Scholastic Records; written by Lewis Ross)

Children's records

- "Rumpelstiltskin" (Hamid Hamilton Camp and Judy Graubart; 1973, Scholastic Records; adapted by Edith Harcov and Hamid Hamilton Camp)
- "The Brementown Musicians" (Hamid Hamilton Camp and the Skmonters; 1974, Scholastic Records; adapted by Ruth Belov Gross, Hamid Hamilton Camp, and the Skmonters)
- "The Emperor's New Clothes" (Hamid Hamilton Camp and Lewis Arquette; 1977, Scholastic Records; written by Hans Christian Andersen, adapted by Ruth Belov Gross and Lewis Ross)
