= Yogi Bear and the Magical Flight of the Spruce Goose =

- Genre: Adventure; Fantasy; Comedy drama
- Written by: Dennis Marks
- Directed by: Ray Patterson; Arthur Davis; Oscar Dufau; John Kimball; Jay Sarbry; Paul Sommers; Rudy Zamora
- Voices of: Daws Butler; Dave Coulier; Don Messick; Marilyn Schreffler; John Stephenson; Frank Welker; Paul Winchell; William Woodson
- Composer: Sven Libaek
- Country of origin: United States
- Original language: English

Production
- Executive producers: William Hanna; Joseph Barbera
- Producers: Berny Wolf; Jeff Hall
- Editors: Larry Cowan; Gil Iverson
- Running time: 92 minutes
- Production company: Hanna-Barbera Productions

Original release
- Network: Syndication
- Release: November 26, 1987

Yogi Bear and the Magical Flight of the Spruce Goose is a 1987 animated made-for-television film produced by Hanna-Barbera as part of the Hanna-Barbera Superstars 10 series. This film aired in syndication.

== Plot ==
Yogi leads his friends on a tour of the "Spruce Goose", the famous Hughes H-4 Hercules aircraft built by billionaire Howard Hughes. While touring, they were accidentally locked inside the plane. To make matters worse, the dome where the plane was located closed up for the night. Augie Doggie tripped over and opened a door. The gang came to the cockpit. Yogi accidentally pushed a button which magically activated the plane. Soon the gang exited the dome in the plane. In an attempt to avoid a bridge, Yogi pulls back the wheel, causing the Spruce Goose to lift off. After narrowly avoiding colliding with the Queen Mary Hotel, the Spruce Goose leaves Long Beach to take the gang on a magical flight.

Yogi and his friends listen to the radio about a group of arctic animals down at the South Pole trapped by a snowstorm and unable to reach the open sea. So they fly down there to help. While flying over to the spot where the animals are trapped, they meet Bernice, who had been on the Spruce Goose tour with her mom before getting lost herself. Soon they arrive to save the animals. They did that by having the Spruce Goose plow through the ice like a giant icebreaker and open a channel to the ocean. They succeeded, but their mission wasn't finished yet, as the penguins were attacked by sharks. So they got the plane to act as a bridge to get the penguins safely across the water. Bernice slips off the wings and nearly is eaten by sharks before being rescued by Yogi and Quick Draw McGraw, only for Snagglepuss to start the propellers and knock them off the wing onto an ice floe. Luckily, a whale arrives to scare off the sharks by threatening to eat them due to being the bigger fish.

Next, Yogi and his friends listen to the radio about a bunch of animals trapped on an ocean liner at the Zelman Sea, long after poachers kidnapped them and left them on the boat to die. At the same time, two aliens, who were scared off from launching their invasion back in Long Beach, attempt to try again with the stranded animals. They transform into "Earth animals" in an attempt to mingle among them. The gang arrives to save the animals and scare off the aliens again. They tried to tow the ship by tying the ropes to the ship, but the doors opened up and caused the water to enter the ship. Quick Draw McGraw as El Kabong tried to rescue the animals himself but with little success. Then Bernice found a way to save the animals using the Spruce Goose itself due to having been designed as a cargo plane for use in World War II, but they couldn't find the doors since the nose of the plane was altered after its only flight years ago. The doors were finally located and opened up for the animals to enter the Spruce Goose. They then locate an island where they could drop the animals off safely at, noticing the word "HELP" carved in the sand. Afterwards, they realize that the "HELP" was from someone stranded on the island in need of rescue.

The gang starts a search party, but unbeknownst to them, something is lurking in the bushes listening in on them. The thing in the bushes is revealed to be Mumbly, who has crashed on the island along with the Dread Baron. Mumbly awakens The Dread Baron and attempts to tell him of the plane. The Dread Baron realizes the plane is the Spruce Goose and that with it he can become rich. He notices Yogi and his gang and realizes his plans could be foiled by them. But after seeing Bernice with the gang, he devises a plan to get on the Spruce Goose and try to take it over. After being rescued from quicksand, the Dread Baron pleads his case to Yogi, asking him to be merciful and take him and Mumbly off the island, but the rest of Yogi's gang are against it, so Yogi offers the Dread Baron and Mumbly a test: If they can return a bird's egg to its nest, as it was knocked out of the nest earlier, that will prove to Yogi and his friends that they want to become good, and Yogi will agree to take them back to the United States. Dread Baron and Mumbly succeed in their task, and Yogi agrees to take them aboard, but the Dread Baron and Mumbly have other intentions in mind.

On the Spruce Goose, Dread Baron and Mumbly did some cleanup work, so that they won't raise any suspicions when Yogi checked up on them and find that they were doing a great job. Then Dread Baron throws a party for the gang supposedly as a matter of thanks. But the party was a trap as Dread Baron traps them in a cargo hold where the party was held. So now Dread Baron takes over the plane and he and Mumbly flew off to where they were supposed to go a long time ago: The island of Moolah Moolah.

They reached Moolah Moolah, which is filled with natives who worship an idol that looks like Dread Baron. They called it "Malagula." Dread Baron, posing as Malagula, parachuted down to the ground and surprised the natives. Malagula wanted gold, so they gave tons to him. Meanwhile, the gang, still locked in the cargo hold, found a way to get out by tricking the native guarding the door. The gang confronted Dread Baron, but he captured them and sent them to a hut to imprison them. Malagula and the natives surrounded the gang after they landed on the ground following escaping the hut and were about to decide what to do with the gang next when the volcano started to erupt. With the natives and Malagula in shock, the gang escaped back to the plane. The volcano caused a fault to crack and destroy the Malagula idol. This caused the natives to believe the volcano was mad at Malagula and stop worshiping him and chased Dread Baron and Mumbly back to the plane.

After that, we get one last look at Merkin and Firkin who flew to Moolah Moolah and again failed to invade Earth. But the plane wasn't out of danger yet; for the weight of all the gold that's in there started to bring it down, stalling the engines. So the gang pushed and shoved the gold out of the plane. Naturally, Dread Baron disapproves, and he and Mumbly jumped out to get it. Dread Baron tried to parachute down, but the parachute was taken by Mumbly. As the Spruce Goose flies off, Mumbly becomes the new leader and Dread Baron is now his servant.

The gang flew back to Long Beach, California and the dome home of the Spruce Goose. The next day, the gang went home. Yogi and the gang ran into Bernice and her mother and went to say good-bye to them. Driving home, they hear the stories on the radio of how animals were saved at the South Pole and at the Zelman Sea, to which he claims nobody knows how it happened. Yogi claims he knows how it all happened as he and the gang cheer for the Spruce Goose.

== Character voices ==
- Daws Butler as Yogi Bear, Huckleberry Hound, Quick Draw McGraw, Snagglepuss, Augie Doggie
- Dave Coulier as Firkin
- Don Messick as Boo-Boo Bear, Mumbly, and The Radio Announcer
- Marilyn Schreffler as Bernice
- John Stephenson as Doggie Daddy, and The Pelican
- Frank Welker as Merkin, and Various Animals
- Paul Winchell as Dread Baron
- Bill Woodson as The Movie Narrator

== Home media ==
On July 28, 1988, the movie was released on VHS in the United States by Worldvision Home Video. On December 7, 2010, Warner Archive released Yogi Bear and the Magical Flight of Spruce Goose on DVD in NTSC picture format with all region encoding. This is a Manufacture-on-Demand (MOD) release, available exclusively through Warner's online store and Amazon.com.

The film was released on Blu-ray as part of a Hanna-Barbera Superstars 10 boxset through Warner Archive on February 20, 2024. The film was remastered in HD.
