= Ride a White Horse (film) =

- Directed by: Bob Evans
- Written by: Ted Roberts
- Produced by: Bob Evans
- Narrated by: Bob Evans; Phil Halderman
- Cinematography: Bob Evans
- Edited by: Hans Pomeranz
- Music by: Sven Libaek
- Release date: 1968
- Running time: 78 minutes
- Country: Australia
- Language: English

Ride a White Horse is a 1968 Australian surf film directed by Bob Evans. Surfers featured included Midget Farrelly, Nat Young, Bob McTavish, and Peter Drouyn.

The Age film reviewer Colin Bennett describes it as "Evans' answer to The Endless Summer The films jazz soundtrack was created by Sven Libaek and was released as To Ride a White Horse by Festival Records. Musicians featured include John Sangster, Richard Brooks, George Golla, and Don Burrows
