= Sven Libaek =

Sven Erik Libæk
- Also known as: Sven Libaek
- Born: 20 September 1938 (age 87); Norway
- Origin: Juilliard School
- Genres: Film scores, TV soundtracks
- Occupations: Composer; conductor; A & R manager; producer/arranger; musician
- Instruments: Piano
- Years active: 1958–present
- Label: Staff producer for the Australian division of CBS Records

Sven Erik Libaek (born 20 September 1938) is a Norwegian-Australian composer, record producer and musician. He composes film and TV soundtrack music and, as the staff producer for the Australian division of CBS Records, influenced the Australian popular music scene in the mid-1960s. In 1982, an album titled Endless Love peaked at number 71 in Australia; his only top 100 charting release.

== Biography ==
Libaek was born in Norway on 20 September 1938, trained as both a pianist and an actor and is a graduate of the Juilliard School in New York. He first achieved international recognition with a role in the Louis de Rochemont film Windjammer in which he both acted and performed as piano soloist with Arthur Fiedler and the Boston Pops Orchestra.

Libaek first came to Australia in 1960 as a member of the band the Windjammers, which toured the United States and Australia to promote the film. Shortly after the group broke up, Libaek and his wife returned to Australia to live.

In 1963, Libaek was hired by the newly established CBS Records (Australia), which had been incorporated following the 1960 takeover of the Australian Record Company by Columbia Records in the United States.

During his tenure as musical director and A&R manager for CBS (as well as general manager for April Music Publishing in Sydney) Libaek built up a roster of pop, folk and jazz performers and produced over two hundred singles and albums, as well as writing (or co-writing with his wife) many of the titles he produced.

His CBS credits include producing all the CBS recordings by surf music band the Atlantics including their hit "Bombora", folk musicians Gary Shearston and Patsy Biscoe. He left CBS in 1968 to work as a freelance composer, arranger, conductor and established his own music production company.

Libaek's Australian film and TV credits include Nickel Queen, The Set, Ride A White Horse, Vincent Serventy's nature series Nature Walkabout, the drama series Boney, the Ron and Valerie Taylor underwater documentary series Inner Space, ABC-TV's magazine series A Big Country, The World Around Us, Joe Wilson and The Settlement. He worked with Maurice Jarre as musical co-ordinator and orchestrator for the Peter Weir film The Year of Living Dangerously and also hosted his own TV show on ABC-TV, All About Music, in 1974.

Libaek lived and worked in Los Angeles from 1977 to 1994 where he orchestrated more than 300 popular songs for US radio stations and artists including Lionel Richie and Neil Diamond, and he also worked for the Hanna-Barbera company, composing the scores for all of the Hanna-Barbera Superstars 10 animated TV movies.

During his career, Libaek has had more than thirty albums of his music released. His has composed concert works for instruments including the piano, classical guitar, flute and clarinet and he is the resident conductor of Sydney's Sutherland Shire Symphony Orchestra. For the Australian Centenary of Federation in 2001 he was commissioned by the Sutherland Shire Council to compose a work for symphony orchestra, choir and brass band, with words by his wife, Lolita Rivera. The First Shire was performed at Cronulla Beach in front of 10,000 people in January 2001.

While living in the United States, Libaek was a frequent adjudicator for the Glendale Unified School District in California. In Australia he has served as adjudicator for the Ryde and Goulburn Eisteddfods and the Sutherland Shire instrumental competition for young people conducted by the Sutherland Shire Music Club. He has taught piano at Shore School, acts as composer-in-residence at Port Hacking High School and frequently lectures at the Australian Film, Television and Radio School in Sydney.

Libaek has been a member of the Music Arrangers Guild of Australia for over thirty years, joined the national executive in 1996 and was elected president of the guild in 2000.

Libaek's soundtrack music has enjoyed a resurgence in popularity in recent years following its use in the 2004 film The Life Aquatic with Steve Zissou; thanks to the influence of the film's Australian co-star, Noah Taylor. Its director, Wes Anderson, selected five Libaek compositions (originally written for Inner Space and Boney) as part of its score.

== Filmography ==
=== Films ===
Year	Title	Director(s)	Studio(s)	Notes
1970	Nickel Queen	John McCallum		—N/a
1971	The Set	Frank Brittain		—N/a
1984	The Settlement	Howard Rubie		—N/a
1987	Yogi's Great Escape	Paul Sommer; Bob Goe; Rudy Zamora	Hanna-Barbera Productions	—N/a
1987	The Jetsons Meet the Flintstones	Don Lusk	Hanna-Barbera Productions	—N/a
1987	Scooby-Doo Meets the Boo Brothers	Paul Sommer; Carl Urbano	Hanna-Barbera Productions	—N/a
1987	Yogi Bear and the Magical Flight of the Spruce Goose	Ray Patterson; Arthur Davis; Oscar Dufau	Hanna-Barbera Productions	—N/a
1988	Top Cat and the Beverly Hills Cats	Paul Sommer; Charles A. Nichols; Ray Patterson	Hanna-Barbera Productions	—N/a
1988	Yogi and the Invasion of the Space Bears	Don Lusk; Ray Patterson	Hanna-Barbera Productions	—N/a
1988	Rockin' with Judy Jetson	Paul Sommer	Hanna-Barbera Productions	—N/a
1988	The Good, the Bad, and Huckleberry Hound	Bob Goe; John Kimball; Charles A. Nichols; Jay Sarbry	Hanna-Barbera Productions	—N/a
1988	Scooby-Doo and the Ghoul School	Charles A. Nichols	Hanna-Barbera Productions	—N/a
1988	Scooby-Doo! and the Reluctant Werewolf	Ray Patterson	Hanna-Barbera Productions	—N/a
