= Hanna-Barbera Superstars 10 =

Animated film series

- Genre: Comedy drama
- Starring: Yogi Bear; Scooby-Doo; The Jetsons; The Flintstones; Top Cat; Huckleberry Hound
- Music by: Sven Libaek
- Country of origin: United States
- Original language: English

Production
- Executive producers: William Hanna; Joseph Barbera
- Running time: 90–95 minutes
- Production company: Hanna-Barbera Productions

Original release
- Network: Syndication
- Release: September 20, 1987 – November 20, 1988

Hanna-Barbera Superstars 10 is a series of 10 syndicated made-for-television animated films produced by Hanna-Barbera Productions as part of The Funtastic World of Hanna-Barbera programming block from September 20, 1987 to November 20, 1988, featuring the studio's most popular animated characters: Yogi Bear, Scooby-Doo, The Jetsons, The Flintstones, Top Cat and Huckleberry Hound. The first 8 films used traditional cel animation and were mastered on 35mm film, while the last 2 films used digital ink and paint and were mastered on videotape.

== Films ==
Original release date	Title	Written by	Directed by
September 20, 1987	Yogi's Great Escape	Neal Barbera	Bob Goe; Paul Sommer; Rudy Zamora
October 18, 1987	Scooby-Doo Meets the Boo Brothers	Jim Ryan	Paul Sommer; Carl Urbano
November 15, 1987	The Jetsons Meet the Flintstones	Don Nelson; Arthur Alsberg	Don Lusk
November 26, 1987	Yogi Bear and the Magical Flight of the Spruce Goose	Dennis Marks	John Kimball; Art Davis; Rudy Zamora; Jay Sarbry; Oscar Dufau; Paul Sommers
March 20, 1988	Top Cat and the Beverly Hills Cats	Barry Blitzer	Paul Sommer; Charles A. Nichols
May 6, 1988	The Good, the Bad, and Huckleberry Hound	John Ludin; Tom Ruegger	Bob Goe; John Kimball; Charles A. Nichols; Jay Sarbry
September 18, 1988	Rockin' with Judy Jetson	Charles M. Howell IV; Kevin Hopps	Paul Sommer
October 16, 1988	Scooby-Doo and the Ghoul School	Glenn Leopold	Charles A. Nichols
November 13, 1988	Scooby-Doo and the Reluctant Werewolf	Jim Ryan	Ray Patterson
November 20, 1988	Yogi and the Invasion of the Space Bears	Neal Barbera	Don Lusk

== Crew ==
- Executive Producers: William Hanna and Joseph Barbera
- Directors: Arthur Davis, Oscar Dufau, Bob Goe, John Kimball, Don Lusk, Charles A. Nichols, Ray Patterson, Jay Sabry, Paul Sommer, Carl Urbano, Rudy Zamora
- Executive in Charge of Production: Jayne Barbera
- Creative Designer: Iwao Takamoto
- Show Editor: Gil Iverson
- Supervising Director: Ray Patterson
- Character Designer: Scott Jeralds
- Casting Director: Andrea Romano
- Recording Director: Gordon Hunt
- Graphics Iraj Paran, Tom Wogatzke
- Music Composed and Conducted by: Hoyt Curtin, Sven Libaek
- Director of Music Supervision: Joanne Miller

== Home media ==
All of the films except for Scooby-Doo and the Reluctant Werewolf and Yogi and the Invasion of the Space Bears were released on VHS shortly after their original broadcasts by Worldvision Home Video (a sister division of then-Hanna-Barbera owner Taft Broadcasting), Scooby-Doo and the Reluctant Werewolf and Yogi and the Invasion of the Space Bears finally saw VHS releases in 1991 and 1992 by Goodtimes Home Video. On December 7, 2010, Warner Bros. released Yogi's Great Escape on DVD via the Warner Archive. Warner Home Video also released Scooby-Doo Meets the Boo Brothers on DVD on May 6, 2003. and Scooby-Doo and the Ghoul School on DVD on June 4, 2002.

The Jetsons Meet the Flintstones has been released on VHS four times, first by Worldvision Home Video on April 7, 1988, then by Hanna-Barbera Home Video on January 26, 1989, then by Kid Klassics on October 20, 1989, and later by Warner Home Video on July 3, 2001. The film was finally released on DVD for the first time on June 14, 2011.

On July 28, 1988, Yogi Bear and the Magical Flight of the Spruce Goose was released on VHS videocassette in the United States. On December 7, 2010, Warner Home Video released Yogi Bear and the Magical Flight of the Spruce Goose on DVD via the Warner Archive. As of August 2011, all of the Hanna-Barbera Superstars 10 episodes are available on DVD through Warner Archive. While all 10 films have appeared on Cartoon Network and Boomerang, two cable channels primarily dedicated to classic Hanna-Barbera material, only the Scooby-Doo films in the series still appear in regular rotation on Cartoon Network and Boomerang, as part of Cartoon Theatre on Cartoon Network and Boomerang Theatre. All 10 films were also released on VHS videocassette since they have aired on Cartoon Network since the 1990s.

The Hanna-Barbera Superstars 10 films were released on Blu-ray separately and in a complete boxset through Warner Archive on February 20, 2024, along with Scooby Goes Hollywood and Yogi's Ark Lark as bonus features. All of the films were remastered in HD, with the cel animated films being re-scanned from 35mm film in high definition, and the digitally painted films being upscaled and detelecined from their 1-inch videotape masters.

== See also ==
- The ABC Saturday Superstar Movie
- The Funtastic World of Hanna-Barbera
- List of works produced by Hanna-Barbera Productions
