= List of Soreike! Anpanman episodes =

This is a list of episodes to the Soreike! Anpanman anime series. Produced by TMS Entertainment and directed by Akinori Nagaoka and Shunji Ôga, the series has aired on NTV since October 3, 1988.

== Episodes ==
=== 1988 ===
No.	Title	Original release date
1	"The Birth of Anpanman"; Transliteration: "Anpanman Tanjō" (Japanese: アンパンマン誕生)	October 3, 1988
2	"Anpanman and Baikinman"; Transliteration: "Anpanman to Baikinman" (Japanese: アンパンマンとばいきんまん)	October 10, 1988
2	"Anpanman and Currypanman"; Transliteration: "Anpanman to Karēpanman" (Japanese: アンパンマンとカレーパンマン)	October 10, 1988
3	"Anpanman and Hamigakiman"; Transliteration: "Anpanman to Hamigakiman" (Japanese: アンパンマンとはみがきまん)	October 17, 1988
3	"Anpanman and Shokupanman"; Transliteration: "Anpanman to Shokupanman" (Japanese: アンパンマンとしょくぱんまん)	October 17, 1988
4	"Anpanman and Rakugaki Kozou"; Transliteration: "Anpanman to Rakugaki Kozō" (Japanese: アンパンマンとらくがきこぞう)	October 24, 1988
4	"Anpanman and Omusubiman"; Transliteration: "Anpanman to Omusubiman" (Japanese: アンパンマンとおむすびまん)	October 24, 1988
5	"Anpanman and Hinotama Kozou"; Transliteration: "Anpanman to Hinotama Kozō" (Japanese: アンパンマンとひのたまこぞう)	October 31, 1988
5	"Anpanman and Ramen Tenshi"; Transliteration: "Anpanman to Rāmen Tenshi" (Japanese: アンパンマンとらーめんてんし)	October 31, 1988
6	"Anpanman and Takoyakiman"; Transliteration: "Anpanman to Takoyakiman" (Japanese: アンパンマンとたこやきまん)	November 7, 1988
6	"Anpanman and Milk Bouya"; Transliteration: "Anpanman to Miruku Bōya" (Japanese: アンパンマンとみるくぼうや)	November 7, 1988
7	"Anpanman and Butamanman"; Transliteration: "Anpanman to Butamanman" (Japanese: アンパンマンとぶたまんまん)	November 14, 1988
7	"Anpanman and Kazekonkon"; Transliteration: "Anpanman to Kazekonkon" (Japanese: アンパンマンとかぜこんこん)	November 14, 1988
8	"Anpanman and Tankobuman"; Transliteration: "Anpanman to Tankobuman" (Japanese: アンパンマンとたんこぶまん)	November 21, 1988
8	"Anpanman and Kaiju Ankora"; Transliteration: "Anpanman to Kaijū Ankora" (Japanese: アンパンマンとかいじゅうアンコラ)	November 21, 1988
9	"Anpanman and Sibling Bread"; Transliteration: "Anpanman to Sokkuripan" (Japanese: アンパンマンとそっくりぱん)	November 28, 1988
9	"Anpanman and Kaminari Pikatan"; Transliteration: "Anpanman to Kaminari Pikatan" (Japanese: アンパンマンとかみなりぴかたん)	November 28, 1988
10	"Anpanman and Building Block Castle"; Transliteration: "Anpanman to Tsukimi no Shiro" (Japanese: アンパンマンとつみきのしろ)	December 5, 1988
10	"Anpanman and Pot-chan"; Transliteration: "Anpanman to Potto-chan" (Japanese: アンパンマンとポットちゃん)	December 5, 1988
11	Transliteration: "Anpanman to Itainoton Dekedake" (Japanese: アンパンマンとイタイノトンデケダケ)	December 12, 1988
11	Transliteration: "Anpanman to Pīchiku Mori" (Japanese: アンパンマンとぴいちくもり)	December 12, 1988
12	"Santa Claus Disappeared"; Transliteration: "Kieta Santa Kurōsu" (Japanese: 消えたサンタクロース)	December 19, 1988
13	"Anpanman and Dokin-chan"; Transliteration: "Anpanman to Dokin-chan" (Japanese: アンパンマンとドキンちゃん)	December 26, 1988
13	"Anpanman and Ringo-chan"; Transliteration: "Anpanman to Ringo-chan" (Japanese: アンパンマンとりんごちゃん)	December 26, 1988

=== 1989 ===
No.	Title	Original release date
14	Transliteration: "Anpanman to Mienaiman / Anpanman to Nankandā" (Japanese: アンパンマンとみえないまん / アンパンマンとナンカヘンダー)	January 9, 1989
15	"Anpanman and Princess Lake / Anpanman and Sludgeman"; Transliteration: "Anpanman to Mizuumi-hime / Anpanman to Hedoroman" (Japanese: アンパンマンとみずうみひめ / アンパンマンとへどろまん)	January 16, 1989
16	"Anpanman and Dadandan / Anpanman and the Bread Thief"; Transliteration: "Anpanman to Dadandan / Anpanman to Pan Dorobou" (Japanese: アンパンマンとだだんだん / アンパンマンとぱんどろぼう)	January 23, 1989
17	"Anpanman and the Sea Devil / Omusubiman Came Back"; Transliteration: "Anpanman to Umi no Akuma / Kaettekita Omusubiman" (Japanese: アンパンマンとうみのあくま / かえってきたおむすびまん)	January 30, 1989
18	"Anpanman to the Country of Witches / Anpanman and Kettleman"; Transliteration: "Anpanman Majō no Kuni e / Anpanman to Yakanman" (Japanese: アンパンマンまじょのくにへ / アンパンマンとやかんまん)	February 6, 1989
19	"Anpanman and Mogurin"; Transliteration: "Anpanman to Mogurin" (Japanese: アンパンマンともぐりん)	February 13, 1989
20	"Anpanman and the Ghost Forest / Anpanman and Namekujira"; Transliteration: "Anpanman to Obake no Mori / Anpanman to Name Kujira" (Japanese: アンパンマンとおばけのもり / アンパンマンとなめくじら)	February 27, 1989
21	"Anpanman and Baikin Robot / Anpanman and Osoujiman"; Transliteration: "Anpanman to Baikin Robotto / Anpanman to Osoujiman" (Japanese: アンパンマンとバイキンロボット / アンパンマンとおそうじまん)	March 6, 1989
22	"Anpanman and the Bamboo Thicket / Anpanman and the Lost Alien"; Transliteration: "Anpanman to Chikurin / Anpanman to Maigo no Uchūjin" (Japanese: アンパンマンとちくりん / アンパンマンとまいごのうちゅうじん)	March 13, 1989
23	"Anpanman and Yawning Bird / Anpanman and Soft Cream Man"; Transliteration: "Anpanman to Akubi Dori / Anpanman to Sofuto Kurīmu Man" (Japanese: アンパンマンとあくびどり / アンパンマンとソフトクリームマン)	March 20, 1989
24	"Anpanman and Shanbo the Kid / Anpanman and Kabirunrun"; Transliteration: "Anpanman to Kosou no Shanbo / Anpanman to Kabirunrun" (Japanese: アンパンマンとこぞうのジャンボ / アンパンマンとかびるんるん)	March 27, 1989
25	"Anpanman and Burst Island / Ms. Batako's Birthday"; Transliteration: "Anpanman to Panpan-jima / Batako-san no Tanjōubi" (Japanese: アンパンマンとぽんぽんじま / バタコさんのたんじょうび)	April 3, 1989
26	"Anpanman and Baikin Sennin / Anpanman and Tendon Mom"; Transliteration: "Anpanman to Baikin Sennin / Anpanman to Tendon Ka-san" (Japanese: アンパンマンとバイキンせんにん / アンパンマンとてんどん母さん)	April 10, 1989
27	"Anpanman and the Country of Sweets / Anpanman and Akachanman"; Transliteration: "Anpanman to Okashi no Kuni / Anpanman and Akachanman" (Japanese: アンパンマンとおかしのくに / アンパンマンとあかちゃんまん)	April 17, 1989
28	Transliteration: "Anpanman to Taiyaki-gou / Anpanman to Dojou Ojisan" (Japanese: アンパンマンとタイヤキごう / アンパンマンとどじょうおじさん)	April 24, 1989
29	"Anpanman and Sugudasuman / Anpanman and Creampanman"; Transliteration: "Anpanman to Sugudasuman / Anpanman and Creampanman" (Japanese: アンパンマンとスグダスマン / アンパンマンとクリームパンマン)	May 1, 1989
30	"Anpanman and the Magic Lamp / Anpanman and Hamburger Kid"; Transliteration: "Anpanman to Mahou no Ranpu / Anpanman to Hanbāgā Kiddo" (Japanese: アンパンマンとまほうのランプ / アンパンマンとハンバーガーキッド)	May 8, 1989
31	"Anpanman and Hot Dog / Anpanman and Dirtyman"; Transliteration: "Anpanman to Hotto Doggu / Anpanman to Fuketsuman" (Japanese: アンパンマンとホットドッグ / アンパンマンとふけつまん)	May 15, 1989
32	"Anpanman and the Indian Magician / Anpanman and Karen's Forest"; Transliteration: "Anpanman to Majūtsushi Doronga / Anpanman to Karen no Mori" (Japanese: アンパンマンとまじゅつしドロンガ / アンパンマンとカレンのもり)	May 22, 1989
33	"Anpanman and the Curse of the Pyramid / Anpanman and Sandwichman"; Transliteration: "Anpanman to Piramiddo no Noroi / Anpanman to Sandoicchiman" (Japanese: アンパンマンとピラミッドののろい / アンパンマンとサンドイッチマン)	May 29, 1989
34	"Anpanman and Tartan"; Transliteration: "Anpanman to Tātan" (Japanese: アンパンマンとタータン)	June 5, 1989
35	"Anpanman and Dodo's Island / Anpanman and Catfishman"; Transliteration: "Anpanman to Dodo no Shima / Anpanman to Namazuman" (Japanese: アンパンマンとドドのしま / アンパンマンとナマズマン)	June 12, 1989
36	"Anpanman and Puzzle Bird / Anpanman and Inspector Pepper"; Transliteration: "Anpanman to Pazuru Dori / Anpanman to Peppā Keibu" (Japanese: アンパンマンとパズルどり / アンパンマンとペッパーけいぶ)	June 19, 1989
37	"Anpanman and Kūtan the Whale / Anpanman and the Mysterious Black"; Transliteration: "Anpanman to Kujira no Kūtan / Anpanman to Nazo no Burakku" (Japanese: アンパンマンとくじらのクータン / アンパンマンとなぞのブラック)	June 26, 1989
38	"Akachanman Came Back / Anpanman and Crescent Moon Man"; Transliteration: "Kattekita Akachanman / Anpanman to Mikadzukiman" (Japanese: かえってきたあかちゃんまん / アンパンマンとみかづきまん)	July 3, 1989
39	"Anpanman and Baikin Ondo / Anpanman and the Flower of Courage"; Transliteration: "Anpanman to Baikin Ondo / Anpanman to Yūki no Hana" (Japanese: アンパンマンとバイキンおんど / アンパンマンとゆうきのはな)	July 10, 1989
40	"Anpanman and the Donburiman Trio"; Transliteration: "Anpanman to Donburiman Torio" (Japanese: アンパンマンとどんぶりまんトリオ)	July 17, 1989
41	"Anpanman and Skullman the Mysterious Person / Anpanman and Dokin-chan's Dream"; Transliteration: "Anpanman to Kaijin Dokuroman / Anpanman to Dokin-chan no Yume" (Japanese: アンパンマンとかいじんドクロマン / アンパンマンとドキンちゃんのゆめ)	July 24, 1989
42	"Anpanman and Moku-chan the Cloud/ Anpanman and Fireworksman"; Transliteration: "Anpanman to Kumo no Moku-chan / Anpanman to Hanabiman" (Japanese: アンパンマンと雲のもくちゃん / アンパンマンとはなびまん)	July 31, 1989
43	"Anpanman and the Country of Rainbows / Anpanman and Ghost Boy"; Transliteration: "Anpanman to Niji no Kuni / Anpanman to Obake Bouya" (Japanese: アンパンマンとにじのくに / アンパンマンとおばけぼうや)	August 7, 1989
44	"Anpanman and Jellyfishman / Anpanman and the Curry Festival"; Transliteration: "Anpanman to Kurageman / Anpanman to Karē Matsuri" (Japanese: アンパンマンとくらげまん / アンパンマンとカレーまつり)	August 14, 1989
45	"Anpanman and Sand Man / Anpanman and Moguradon"; Transliteration: "Anpanman and Suna Otoko / Anpanman to Moguradon" (Japanese: アンパンマンとすなおとこ / アンパンマンとモグラドン)	August 21, 1989
46	"Anpanman and Tekka no Maki-chan / Anpanman and Donutsman"; Transliteration: "Anpanman to Tekka no Maki-chan / Anpanman to Dōnatsuman" (Japanese: アンパンマンと鉄火のマキちゃん / アンパンマンとドーナツマン)	August 28, 1989
47	"Anpanman and Mamasaurus / Anpanman and Princess Kuroyuki"; Transliteration: "Anpanman to Mamazaurusu / Anpanman to Kuroyuki-hime" (Japanese: アンパンマンとママザウルス / アンパンマンとくろゆきひめ)	September 4, 1989
48	"Anpanman and the Country of Cats / Anpanman and the Flying Wooden Horse"; Transliteration: "Anpanman to Neko no Kuni / Anpanman to Tobu Mokuba" (Japanese: アンパンマンとねこのくに / アンパンマンととぶ木馬)	September 11, 1989
49	"Anpanman and the Sausage Show / Anpanman and the Little Violin"; Transliteration: "Anpanman to Sōsēji Shō / Anpanman to Chiisana Baiorin" (Japanese: アンパンマンとソーセージショー / アンパンマンとちいさなバイオリン)	September 18, 1989
50	"Anpanman and Gomira"; Transliteration: "Anpanman to Gomira" (Japanese: アンパンマンとゴミラ)	September 25, 1989
51	"Anpanman and the Upside Down Island / Anpanman and Mushroom-chan"; Transliteration: "Anpanman to Sakasama Shima / Anpanman to Kinoko-chan" (Japanese: アンパンマンとサカサマ島 / アンパンマンときのこちゃん)	October 2, 1989
52	"Anpanman and Uncle Walrus / Anpanman and Cricket Valley"; Transliteration: "Anpanman to Seiuchi Ojisan / Anpanman to Kororin Tani" (Japanese: アンパンマンとセイウチおじさん / アンパンマンとコロリン谷)	October 9, 1989
53	"Anpanman and Iruka's Star / Anpanman and Ant Kid"; Transliteration: "Anpanman to Iruka no Hoshi / Anpanman to Arinko Kiddo" (Japanese: アンパンマンとイルカの星 / アンパンマンとアリンコキッド)	October 16, 1989
54	"Anpanman and Don Ki Hotate / Anpanman and Kemutan the Caterpillar"; Transliteration: "Anpanman to Don Ki Hotate / Anpanman to Kemushi no Kemutan" (Japanese: アンパンマンとドン・キ・ホタテ / アンパンマンと毛虫のケムタン)	October 23, 1989
55	"Anpanman and Princess Muscat / Anpanman and Onion Oni"; Transliteration: "Anpanman to Masukatto-hime / Anpanman to Onion Oni" (Japanese: アンパンマンとマスカット姫 / アンパンマンとオニオン鬼)	October 30, 1989
56	Transliteration: "Anpanman to Maigo no Maimai" (Japanese: アンパンマンとまいごのマイマイ)	November 6, 1989
57	"Anpanman and Pillow Kid / Anpanman and Magica-chan the Witch"; Transliteration: "Anpanman to Makura Kozou / Anpanman to Majō no Majika-chan" (Japanese: アンパンマンとまくらこぞう / アンパンマンとまじょのマジカちゃん)	November 13, 1989
58	"Anpanman and Blackboardman / Anpanman and Katsubushiman"; Transliteration: "Anpanman to Kokubanman / Anpanman to Katsubushiman" (Japanese: アンパンマンとこくばんまん / アンパンマンとかつぶしまん)	November 20, 1989
59	"Anpanman and Tango the Dango / Anpanman and Soap Bubble Man"; Transliteration: "Anpanman to Dango no Tango / Anpanman to Shabondaman" (Japanese: アンパンマンとダンゴのタンゴ / アンパンマンとシャボンダマン)	November 27, 1989
60	"Anpanman and Yuki Konkon / Anpanman and Kandzume Kantaroù"; Transliteration: "Anpanman to Yuki Konkon / Anpanman to Kandzume Kantarō" (Japanese: アンパンマンと雪こんこん / アンパンマンとかんづめカン太郎)	December 4, 1989
61	"Anpanman and the Shape Shifting Tanuki / Anpanman and Bakku-chan the Fairy"; Transliteration: "Anpanman to Henshin Tanuki / Anpanman to Yousei Bakku-chan" (Japanese: アンパンマンとへんしんだぬき / アンパンマンとようせいバックちゃん)	December 11, 1989
62	"Anpanman and SL Man / Anpanman and Karuishiman"; Transliteration: "Anpanman to Esu Eru Man / Anpanman to Karuishiman" (Japanese: アンパンマンとSLマン / アンパンマンとカルイシマン)	December 18, 1989
63	"Anpanman and the Christmas Valley"; Transliteration: "Anpanman to Kurisumasu no Tani" (Japanese: アンパンマンとクリスマスの谷)	December 25, 1989

=== 1990 ===
No.	Title	Original release date
64	"Anpanman and Calendarman / Anpanman and Konyaku Oshō"; Transliteration: "Anpanman to Karendāman / Anpanman to Konyaku Oshō" (Japanese: アンパンマンとカレンダーマン / アンパンマンとコンニャクおしょう)	January 8, 1990
65	"Anpanman and Mr. Balloon Hippo / Anpanman and Namaiki Namako"; Transliteration: "Anpanman and Fūsen Kaba-san / Anpanman to Namaiki Namako" (Japanese: アンパンマンとフーセンカバさん / アンパンマンとナマイキナマコ)	January 15, 1990
66	"Anpanman and Pencil Boy / Anpanman and Hammer Bird"; Transliteration: "Anpanman to Enpitsu Bouya / Anpanman to Tonkachi Dori" (Japanese: アンパンマンとエンピツぼうや / アンパンマンとトンカチどり)	January 22, 1990
67	"Anpanman and Hole Punch Bird / Anpanman and Keito Gumo"; Transliteration: "Anpanman to Hasami Dori / Anpanman to Keito Gumo" (Japanese: アンパンマンとハサミどり / アンパンマンと毛糸ぐも)	January 29, 1990
68	"Anpanman and Princess Cream Puff / Anpanman and Tongarashi"; Transliteration: "Anpanman to Shūkurīmu-hime / Anpanman to Tongarashi" (Japanese: アンパンマンとシュークリームひめ / アンパンマンとトンガラシ)	February 5, 1990
