= List of Tsurupika Hagemaru episodes =

The following is a list of episodes of the anime television series Tsurupika Hagemaru.

== Episodes ==
No.	Title	Original air date
1	ハゲ丸誕生/The birth of Hagemaru	March 3, 1988
1	つるセコベストテン/Best 10 Short Stories	March 3, 1988
1	決めろ! つるセコ/Always Misbehaving at School	March 3, 1988
2	オゥ!つるセコ母ちゃん/Hagemaru's Mom is Stingy Behaviour	March 10, 1988
2	つるセコベストテン/Best 10 Short Stories	March 10, 1988
2	つるセコ学園は爆発だ!/Happy Birthday, Miss Sakura	March 10, 1988
3	つるセコ新学期/The New School Term	March 17, 1988
3	つるセコベストテン/Best 10 Short Stories	March 17, 1988
3	つるセコ選手権大会/The Stingy Attitude Games	March 17, 1988
4	つるセコアルバイト大作戦/The Hageda's Part-time Job	March 24, 1988
4	つるセコベストテン/Best 10 Short Stories	March 24, 1988
4	肝っ玉つるセコ母ちゃん!/The Stingy Attitude of Couraging Mom	March 24, 1988
5	春だ花見だつるセコだぞ〜い!/To see Sakura Flowers in Spring	March 31, 1988
5	つるセコベストテン/Best 10 Short Stories	March 31, 1988
5	つるセコ野球の爆発だ!/The Baseball Match of Blast	March 31, 1988
6	デパートでルンルン/Mother and Son's Misadventure in Shopping Mall	April 21, 1988
6	つるセコベストテン/Best 10 Short Stories	April 21, 1988
6	梅桃小学校4年4組/The Class of Year 4 in Umemomo Primary School	April 21, 1988
7	恋はリズムにのって/Always Contact the Loved Ones	April 28, 1988
7	つるセコベストテン/Best 10 Short Stories	April 28, 1988
7	春だ! 釣りだ! 大漁だぞーい!!/Father and Son's Fishing Misadventures	April 28, 1988
8	つるセコワンダーランド/One Day at Amusement Park	May 5, 1988
8	つるセコベストテン/Best 10 Short Stories	May 5, 1988
8	走れヘンテコ電車!/The Life of Train	May 5, 1988
9	つるセコ鯉のぼり/The Tango no sekku Day	May 12, 1988
9	つるセコベストテン/Best 10 Short Stories	May 12, 1988
9	おふろでワッショイ/Showers, Hairs and Eyebrows	May 12, 1988
10	ごそんじ時代劇/Custom Period Drama	May 19, 1988
10	つるセコベストテン/Best 10 Short Stories	May 19, 1988
10	つるセコスポーツ大将/All About Sports	May 19, 1988
11	かなしみのペスエレジー/Elvis' Elegy	June 2, 1988
11	つるセコベストテン/Best 10 Short Stories	June 2, 1988
11	オー! サイクリング/Cycling around the City of Tokyo	June 2, 1988
12	とんでけハゲ丸!!/Call it again, Hagemaru	June 9, 1988
12	つるセコベストテン/Best 10 Short Stories	June 9, 1988
12	それゆけ大運動会/Annual School Sports Day	June 9, 1988
13	元祖つるセコ学園/Once a Weird, Always a Trouble	June 23, 1988
13	つるセコベストテン/Best 10 Short Stories	June 23, 1988
13	キャンキャンキャンプだぞーい/Let's Camping	June 23, 1988
14	お元気ハゲ丸くん/TV, Cameras and Telephones	June 30, 1988
14	つるセコベストテン/Best 10 Short Stories	June 30, 1988
14	潮ひがりでワッセッセ/Just find and digging clams	June 30, 1988
15	お元気一番身体検査/Always Care Your Fitness	July 7, 1988
15	つるセコベストテン/Best 10 Short Stories	July 7, 1988
15	つるセコ動物園/Someday, Going to the Zoo	July 7, 1988
16	セコセコびっちゃんセコびっちゃん/All Things Weather	July 14, 1988
16	つるセコベストテン/Best 10 Short Stories	July 14, 1988
16	セコセコ昔ばなし/Umemomo's Folk Tales	July 14, 1988
17	ハゲ丸の防災訓練/The Emergency Training	July 21, 1988
17	つるセコベストテン/Best 10 Short Stories	July 21, 1988
17	ハゲ丸の原始時代/Hagemaru in Prehistoric Times	July 21, 1988
18	忠犬ペス物語/Elvis, the Story of the Faithful Dog	July 28, 1988
18	つるセコベストテン/Best 10 Short Stories	July 28, 1988
18	つるセコ西部劇/Hagemaru in the Wild Wild West	July 28, 1988
19	ナイターでワッショイ/The Night of the Baseball Match	August 4, 1988
19	つるセコベストテン/Best 10 Short Stories	August 4, 1988
19	ハゲ丸貯金箱/Hagemaru's Piggy Bank	August 4, 1988
20	夏だプールだつるセコだ!/The Outdoor Pool in Summer	August 11, 1988
20	つるセコベストテン/Best 10 Short Stories	August 11, 1988
20	ピッカピカ占い師/The Horoscope	August 11, 1988
21	猛暑に負けるな!/Never Collapse to the Heat Wave	August 25, 1988
21	つるセコベストテン/Best 10 Short Stories	August 25, 1988
21	つるセコ海水浴/Life's a Beach of the Sun	August 25, 1988
22	宿題大作戦/Do Homework, Must Be Done	September 8, 1988
22	つるセコベストテン/Best 10 Short Stories	September 8, 1988
22	桜先生の家庭訪問/Miss Sakura visits Students' House	September 8, 1988
23	青春つるセコ学園/Springtime in Umemomo School	September 15, 1988
23	つるセコベストテン/Best 10 Short Stories	September 15, 1988
23	日本こわ〜いばなし/Japanese Ghost Stories	September 15, 1988
24	つるセコ放送局/Hagemaru's Broadcasting Station	September 22, 1988
24	つるセコベストテン/Best 10 Short Stories	September 22, 1988
24	祭りだ! ワッショイ!/The Lantern Lighting Festival	September 22, 1988
25	お元気健康一番/Take Care Your Healthy Body	October 13, 1988
25	つるセコベストテン/Best 10 Short Stories	October 13, 1988
25	はばたけ大空に!/Jet Lag: The Sky's the Limit	October 13, 1988
26	カメカメカメラマン/Once a Capture, Always be the Cameraman	October 20, 1988
26	つるセコベストテン/Best 10 Short Stories	October 20, 1988
26	つるセコ時代劇/Tsuruseko Period Drama	October 20, 1988
27	ハゲ丸の兄弟や〜い!/Hagemaru Wants a Little Brother	October 27, 1988
27	つるセコベストテン/Best 10 Short Stories	October 27, 1988
27	ハゲ丸の宇宙時代/Hagemaru in the Space Age of Moon	October 27, 1988
28	つるセコジンクス/The Jinx of Life	November 17, 1988
28	つるセコベストテン/Best 10 Short Stories	November 17, 1988
28	ジャングルの王者ハゲ丸/Hagemaru, the Jungle King	November 17, 1988
29	オー! ハゲ丸かあちゃん/Hagemaru's Mother has a Fever	November 24, 1988
29	つるセコベストテン/Best 10 Short Stories	November 24, 1988
29	ハゲ丸ミュージカル/Hagemaru The Musical	November 24, 1988
30	さよなら桜先生/Farwell, Dear Teacher	December 2, 1988
30	つるセコベストテン/Best 10 Short Stories	December 2, 1988
30	オー! シンデレラ/Hagemarella	December 2, 1988
31	元祖つるセコ塾/Study in Tuition Class	December 8, 1988
31	つるセコベストテン/Best 10 Short Stories	December 8, 1988
31	つるセコばあちゃん/Back to Hometown to see Grandma	December 8, 1988
32	みがけ!ピッカピカ超能力/Hagemaru's Physical Power	December 15, 1988
32	つるセコベストテン/Best 10 Short Stories	December 15, 1988
32	ハゲ丸と豆の木/Hagemaru and the Beanstalk	December 15, 1988
33	学級委員だぞ〜い/Who Will be a Class Monitor	December 22, 1988
33	つるセコベストテン/Best 10 Short Stories	December 22, 1988
33	ハゲ丸子守唄/Hagemaru the Babysitter	December 22, 1988
34	寒さをぶっとばせ!/It's a Cold Cold World	January 12, 1989
34	つるセコベストテン/Best 10 Short Stories	January 12, 1989
34	やってきた神さま/The Story of the Poor God and the Grim Reaper	January 12, 1989
35	危険がいっぱい/Danger Everywhere	January 19, 1989
35	つるセコベストテン/Best 10 Short Stories	January 19, 1989
35	ハゲ丸の三つのお願い/Hagemaru's Three Wishes	January 19, 1989
36	あいうえお絵かき/The Art Week	January 26, 1989
36	つるセコベストテン/Best 10 Short Stories	January 26, 1989
36	お見合いセレナーデ/The Perfect Match	January 26, 1989
37	宿題がワンサカ/Hagemaru Doesn't To Do a Homework	February 2, 1989
37	つるセコベストテン/Best 10 Short Stories	February 2, 1989
37	家出だチーパッパ!/Run Away from Home	February 2, 1989
38	家庭教師さんいらっしゃい/The Tutor Teaching at Home	February 9, 1989
38	つるセコベストテン/Best 10 Short Stories	February 9, 1989
38	必殺おしおき人/Four Heroes of Enforcement Justice	February 9, 1989
39	2001年梅桃の旅/Visiting Umemomo in 2001	February 16, 1989
39	つるセコベストテン/Best 10 Short Stories	February 16, 1989
39	ピカピカ! アラビアンナイト/The Story of 1001 Arabian Nights	February 16, 1989
40	内緒の話はあのねのね!/Everybody's Has a Secret	February 23, 1989
40	つるセコベストテン/Best 10 Short Stories	February 23, 1989
40	つるセコ宇宙大脱出!!/Adventures of Great Escape in Space	February 23, 1989
41	つうしんぼや〜い!!/Do a Report in School Break	March 2, 1989
41	つるセコベストテン/Best 10 Short Stories	March 2, 1989
41	なぞなぞ遺跡/The Traces of History	March 2, 1989
42	ハゲ丸探偵団/Hagemaru's Investigation Team	March 9, 1989
42	つるセコベストテン/Best 10 Short Stories	March 9, 1989
42	ハゲ丸の箱舟大作戦!!/The Story of the Ark	March 9, 1989
43	無人島でワッショイ!/Have Fun on the Uninhabited Island	March 16, 1989
43	つるセコベストテン/Best 10 Short Stories	March 16, 1989
43	ピカピカ白雪姫/The Story of Snow White	March 16, 1989
44	ペス公物語/The Dog Tale of Elvis	March 23, 1989
44	つるセコベストテン/Best 10 Short Stories	March 23, 1989
44	大江戸人情長屋/A Boy from Edo	March 23, 1989
45	ペラペラオペラペラ/Pera-Pera, Oh! Pera-Pera	April 19, 1989
45	つるセコベストテン/Best 10 Short Stories	April 19, 1989
45	ハゲ丸100万馬力!!/Hagemaru of One Thousand Horsepower	April 19, 1989
46	青春、カムバック!/Hagemaru's Grandmother comes to Tokyo	May 3, 1989
46	つるセコベストテン/Best 10 Short Stories	May 3, 1989
46	地球最期の日/The Last Boy on Earth in Judgement Day	May 3, 1989
47	熱烈感動ハゲ丸くん!/Hagemaru's Impression of Emotions	May 10, 1989
47	つるセコベストテン/Best 10 Short Stories	May 10, 1989
47	お江戸日本晴れ!/Adventures in Edo of Sunny Day (Edo Nipponbare)	May 10, 1989
48	いってらっしゃい留学生/Hagemaru and the Foreign Students	May 17, 1989
48	つるセコベストテン/Best 10 Short Stories	May 17, 1989
48	オーカミ男がやってきた/The Boy Who Cries Werewolf	May 17, 1989
49	おみごと結婚写真/The Wedding Photo	May 24, 1989
49	つるセコベストテン/Best 10 Short Stories	May 24, 1989
49	つるセコ大航海!/The Great Voyage	May 24, 1989
50	オネショでごめんね/A Trip without Toilet (Getting Pee)	June 14, 1989
50	つるセコベストテン/Best 10 Short Stories	June 14, 1989
50	ハゲ丸のかいけつゼロ/Hagemaru The Zorro Boy	June 14, 1989
51	ハゲ丸の大ヘンシーン!/The Body Swap Story of Hagemaru and Miss Sakura	June 21, 1989
51	つるセコベストテン/Best 10 Short Stories	June 21, 1989
51	暗黒街のハゲ丸くん/Hagemaru in the Dark City	June 21, 1989
52	オナラでハッピッピ!/In the Hospital of Misadventure	July 5, 1989
52	つるセコベストテン/Best 10 Short Stories	July 5, 1989
52	こい恋!地獄へ天国へ/Hageda Family in Hell	July 5, 1989
53	わっペンフレンド!?/Hagemaru's Girl Crush	July 12, 1989
53	つるセコベストテン/Best 10 Short Stories	July 12, 1989
53	とんちんかんハゲ丸くん!!/The Digress of Hagemaru	July 12, 1989
54	ぴっかぴかのヒーロー/The Shining Hero	August 2, 1989
54	つるセコベストテン/Best 10 Short Stories	August 2, 1989
54	ハゲ丸の親連れ狼/Adventures with Hagemaru and his Father	August 2, 1989
55	つるセコ少年野球団/Winning Takes All	August 9, 1989
55	つるセコベストテン/Best 10 Short Stories	August 9, 1989
55	ハチの子ハゲ丸くん/Hagemaru the Honeybee	August 9, 1989
56	ハロー!らくがき小僧/The Magic Blue Crayon	August 23, 1989
56	つるセコベストテン/Best 10 Short Stories	August 23, 1989
56	決闘!荒野のハゲ丸くん/Adventure in the Desert	August 23, 1989
57	お見合いシンフォニー/Miss Sakura meets New Match	August 30, 1989
57	つるセコベストテン/Best 10 Short Stories	August 30, 1989
57	ああ、クレオパトラ!?/The Story of Cleopatra	August 30, 1989
58	バカタレ父ちゃん!/Hagemaru Dad's is not Stupid	September 6, 1989
58	つるセコベストテン/Best 10 Short Stories	September 6, 1989
58	ハゲ丸そんごくう/Hagemaru the Monkey King	September 6, 1989
59	センセイ・センセーション/A New Teacher	October 6, 1989
59	つるセコベストテン/Best 10 Short Stories	October 6, 1989
59	ペスの惑星/Planet of the Dogs	October 6, 1989

== Special Episodes ==
No.	Title	Original air date
1	恋はちいぱっぱ/Love Chipapa	October 6, 1988
1	つるセコベスト20/Best 20 Short Stories	October 6, 1988
1	ピテカントロプスハゲ丸くん/The Pithecanthropus of Hagemaru	October 6, 1988
1	爆笑つるセコアルバム/The Funny of Tsuruseko Album	October 6, 1988
2	コンニャロいじめっこ/Hagemaru Always Doing Bad Behaving	December 29, 1988
2	つるセコベストテン/Best 10 Short Stories	December 29, 1988
2	恐怖の梅桃屋敷/The Horror of Umemomo's Mansion	December 29, 1988
2	忍者ハゲ丸くん/Ninja Hagemaru	December 29, 1988
2	虫歯でワッセッセ/The Toothache of Life	December 29, 1988
2	つるピカハゲ丸クラブ/The Club of Tsurupika Hagemaru	December 29, 1988
2	ハゲ丸昔ばなし/Hagemaru's Folklore	December 29, 1988
3	さらば近藤/Farewell, Kondo	March 30, 1989
3	つるセコベストテン/Best 10 Short Stories	March 30, 1989
3	大奮戦! オロチ退治/The Eight-Forked Serpent	March 30, 1989
3	ミス梅桃!?/Miss Umemomo!?	March 30, 1989
3	つるピカハゲ丸クラブ/The Club of Tsurupika Hagemaru	March 30, 1989
3	愛のキューピット/The Cupid of Love	March 30, 1989
