= Scooby-Doo Meets the Boo Brothers =

1987 television film directed by Carl Urbano Paul Sommer

- Genre: Comedy; Mystery
- Based on: Characters by Hanna-Barbera Productions
- Written by: Jim Ryan
- Directed by: Paul Sommer; Carl Urbano
- Voices of: Don Messick; Casey Kasem; Sorrell Booke; Rob Paulsen; Ronnie Schell; Jerry Houser; Arte Johnson; Victoria Carroll; William Callaway; Michael Rye
- Opening theme: William Hanna
- Composer: Sven Libaek
- Country of origin: United States
- Original language: English

Production
- Executive producers: William Hanna; Joseph Barbera
- Producer: Kay Wright
- Editors: Gil Iverson; Robert Ciaglia
- Running time: 92 minutes
- Production company: Hanna-Barbera Productions

Original release
- Network: Syndication
- Release: October 18, 1987

Related
- Scooby-Doo and the Ghoul School; Scooby-Doo and the Reluctant Werewolf

Scooby-Doo Meets the Boo Brothers is a 1987 animated comedy horror made-for-television film produced by Hanna-Barbera as part of the Hanna-Barbera Superstars 10 series. The 92 minutes film aired in syndication. It is the first full-length film in the Scooby-Doo franchise.

In the film, Norville "Shaggy" Rogers inherits a country estate and a Southern plantation from a recently deceased uncle. While trying to claim his inheritance, Shaggy is harassed by the estate's ghosts (including a Headless Horseman). Scrappy-Doo has the idea to hire a ghost hunting team to deal with the problem. The ghost hunters are themselves a trio of inept ghosts, loosely based on the screen persona of the comedy team The Three Stooges. Meanwhile, Shaggy also has to deal with a trigger-happy enemy of his uncle, who wants to shoot him, and a girl who wishes to marry him, both to settle the feud between their families. A subplot involves treasure hunting, in search of the estate's missing collection of family jewels.

== Plot ==
Shaggy discovers that his uncle Colonel Beauregard has died and has left him his country estate, Beauregard Manor, a Southern plantation. Shaggy, along with Scooby and Scrappy, head for the estate in order to claim Shaggy's inheritance. Before they can get there, they meet Sheriff Rufus Buzby, who warns them about the estate being haunted and that they should return home. Before he can fully convince them, however, Sheriff Buzby receives a call from dispatch, notifying him that a circus train has derailed, resulting in a circus ape escaping. Shaggy, Scooby and Scrappy continue driving down an increasingly spooky road which passes through the family cemetery. Along the way, they encounter a Headless Horseman, a ghost wolf, and the alleged ghost of the Colonel who orders them to leave or else.

Having finally arrived at Beauregard Manor, Shaggy, Scooby and Scrappy meet the late Colonel's creepy manservant Farquard, who tells them that a vast fortune in jewels is hidden somewhere on the estate, which he believes is rightfully his and that Shaggy has no business there. Having already been spooked one too many times, Shaggy, Scooby and Scrappy attempt to immediately leave. However, Shaggy's truck apparently sinks into quicksand, forcing he, Scooby and Scrappy to spend the night there. With ghosts haunting the place, Scrappy has the idea to call a group of ghost exterminators called "The Boo Brothers". Surprisingly, the exterminators—Meako, Freako, and Shreako—are themselves ghosts styled after The Three Stooges, who proceed to hunt down the ghosts that are haunting the estate, with little to no success. In addition, Shaggy meets Sadie Mae Scroggins and her shotgun-toting older brother Billy Bob Scroggins, whose family has an old feud with the Beauregard family. After learning that Shaggy is related to the colonel, Sadie falls in love with him and Billy Bob wants to shoot him.

Later in the night, after things calm down a little, Shaggy, Scooby and Scrappy decide to go into the kitchen to eat something, only to find proof that the famous fortune in jewels is actually real when they find a diamond ring and a letter from the late Colonel with a clue to a treasure hunt. Intrigued by the clue, the gang decides to hunt down the rest of the jewels, much to Farquard's chagrin and that of Sheriff Buzby, who drops by to provide a warning about the gorilla that escaped from the wrecked circus train and was seen headed towards the Beauregard estate. The Sheriff is seemingly skeptical about the jewels' existence.

Shaggy, Scooby and Scrappy then follow the trail through a number of clues that the Colonel has hidden for them, which takes them to several different points in the mansion and also around the rest of the plantation. As the trio progress in their treasure hunt, things become harder, with numerous ghosts appearing, including that of Colonel Beauregard, the Headless Horseman, and a sinister, skeletal Skull Ghost. To make matters worse, the gang also have to deal with Billy Bob and his sister Sadie Mae, both of whom continue to pursue Shaggy, and who keep showing up along with the escaped gorilla. On top of that, the trio encounter a very angry bear, and the Boo Brothers reveal themselves incapable of getting rid of any ghost, only causing more mayhem whenever they try to help. During the search, however, the lost truck is found, having sunk into a secret underground tunnel.

After more treasure hunting, the gang finally finds the last clue, revealing that the treasure is hidden in the mansion's fireplace, much to the happiness of the Skull Ghost, who holds the gang at gunpoint, and tries to claim the fortune for himself before the treasure then pours out of the fireplace, trapping the ghost beneath a massive pile of gold and jewels. Shaggy, Scooby and Scrappy then unmask the Skull Ghost, who appears to be Sheriff Buzby. Just then, however, the real Sheriff Rufus Buzby arrives, revealing that the Skull Ghost is actually his greedy twin brother, T.J. who had been impersonating him, and the remaining ghosts that were haunting the place.

With the treasure found, Shaggy is moved by the Boo Brothers' story that they need a home to haunt, so he turns the mansion over to them and the treasure is then put into the Beauregard Trust Fund for Orphans. Saying their goodbyes, Shaggy and the dogs drive back home. Along the way, they encounter once more Colonel Beauregard's ghost. Shaggy thinks this is another prank by Scooby, until he realizes it's really Beauregard. He subsequently speeds away as fast as possible.

== Cast ==
- Don Messick as Scooby-Doo and Scrappy-Doo
- Casey Kasem as Shaggy Rogers
- Sorrell Booke as Sheriff Rufus Buzby and T.J. Buzby
- William Callaway as Billy Bob Scroggins, Beauregard's Ghost, Ape, Ghost in Attic, and Headless Horseman
- Victoria Carroll as Sadie Mae Scroggins
- Jerry Houser as Meako
- Arte Johnson as Farquard and Skull Ghost
- Rob Paulsen as Shreako and Dispatcher
- Michael Rye as Mayor
- Ronnie Schell as Freako and Demonstrator Ghost
- Hamilton Camp as Ghostly Laugh
- June Foray as Witch

== Home media ==
The film was first released on VHS by Hanna-Barbera Home Video on September 29, 1988 and later by Warner Home Video on March 14, 2000.

Warner Home Video released Scooby-Doo Meets the Boo Brothers on DVD on May 6, 2003.

The film was released on Blu-ray as part of a Hanna-Barbera Superstars 10 boxset through Warner Archive Collection on February 20, 2024. The film was remastered in HD.

== Follow-up film ==
A follow-up film, Scooby-Doo and the Ghoul School, was released on October 16, 1988.

== See also ==
- Hanna-Barbera Superstars 10
- Scooby-Doo and the Ghoul School
- Scooby-Doo! and the Reluctant Werewolf
