= Scooby-Doo and the Ghoul School =

1988 film

- Release poster featuring from left to right, Tanis, Shaggy, Scooby and Elsa
- Based on: Characters by Hanna-Barbera Productions
- Written by: Glenn Leopold
- Directed by: Charles A. Nichols
- Voices of: Don Messick; Casey Kasem; Glynis Johns; Susan Blu; Pat Musick; Russi Taylor; Marilyn Schreffler; Patty Maloney; Frank Welker; Ronnie Schell; Ruta Lee
- Opening theme: William Hanna
- Composer: Sven Libaek
- Country of origin: United States
- Original language: English

Production
- Executive producers: William Hanna; Joseph Barbera
- Producers: Bob Hathcock; Berny Wolf
- Editor: Gil Iverson
- Running time: 92 minutes
- Production companies: Hanna-Barbera Productions; Wang Film Productions

Original release
- Network: Syndication
- Release: October 16, 1988

Related
- Scooby-Doo Meets the Boo Brothers; Scooby-Doo and the Reluctant Werewolf

Scooby-Doo and the Ghoul School is a 1988 animated comedy horror television film produced by Hanna-Barbera for syndication as part of the Hanna-Barbera Superstars 10 series. It is the second full-length film in the Scooby-Doo franchise.

The film was followed by Scooby-Doo! and the Reluctant Werewolf in 1988, with the five girl ghouls making their return in the OK K.O.! Let's Be Heroes episode "Monster Party" in 2018.

== Plot ==
Scooby-Doo, Shaggy, and Scrappy-Doo are on their way to Miss Grimwood's Finishing School for Girls, where they have been hired as gym teachers. However, once there, they find that it is actually a school for daughters of paranormal beings. The pupils include Sibella, the daughter of Count Dracula; Elsa Frankenteen, the daughter of Frankenteen Sr.; Winnie, the daughter of the Wolfman; Phantasma (usually called Phanty for short) the ghostly daughter of a phantom; and Tanis (named after an Egyptian city), the daughter of the Mummy. Other residents include a disembodied floating white hand; an octopus butler; a two-headed shark that lives in the school's moat; Legs, a spider that helps with the upcoming volleyball match; Miss Grimwood, the headmistress; and her diminutive pet dragon Matches. Frightened by this, Shaggy and Scooby are initially hesitant, but they ultimately agree to stay as gym teachers, as the girls quickly take a liking to them.

At the annual volleyball match against the boys of the neighboring Calloway Military Academy, the boys rig the volleyball with a remote control in the hopes of cheating to win. However, Scooby accidentally swallows the remote, which allows the girls to win instead.

The girls' fathers then come for an open house party on Halloween night. Although Scooby and Shaggy are extremely fearful of being trapped in a house full of ghosts and monsters, the fathers are friendly and polite, and the party is a success. Before leaving, the fathers warn a terrified Shaggy and Scooby not to let any harm come to their daughters, lest they face severe consequences.

A power-hungry witch named Revolta and her minion the Grim Creeper then plan to kidnap the girls and convert them into her slaves. She starts by hypnotizing Shaggy into taking the girls on a field trip to the Barren Bog. Matches wants to come along, but is told to stay. The Calloway Cadets are also at the bog on a hike of their own and get stuck in quicksand, but are saved by Elsa and Tanis. Meanwhile, Revolta's spider bats slowly capture the girls one by one, as Revolta brews a potion that will turn the girls evil forever at the stroke of midnight. Having figured out what's going on, Scooby, Scrappy, Shaggy and Matches, who catches up with them, all head for Revolta's castle. Along the way, Scrappy tries to convince the Cadets to join them, but the boys refuse, believing that the girls stole the volleyball match. Arriving at the castle, the gang faces an evil Mirror Monster that can change its shape to look like evil versions of those who look at its mirror, a giant Well Dweller, and Revolta herself. When the clock strikes midnight, Revolta gives the girls the potion through hairdryers, which instantly takes effect. However, Scooby and Shaggy interrupt the process and accidentally reverse the potion's effect. Elsa then throws Revolta's wand into the potion, which causes it to explode. The Cadets, having felt remorse for treating the girls poorly and respecting them for saving their lives, arrive in a pedal power helicopter and fly everyone to safety, as Revolta swears vengeance.

Soon afterward, the Cadets and the Grimwood Girls throw a party celebrating Revolta's defeat and everyone's heroism. Despite being well liked by all their students, Shaggy and Scooby run away in terror when three new monsters – an alien, the Gill-man and Godzilla – enroll their daughters at the school for the following year. As they leave, they see the girls and Matches waving goodbye. Shaggy, Scooby and Scrappy then give them a last werewolf howl before driving off into the night.

== Voice cast ==
- Casey Kasem as Norville "Shaggy" Rogers, Mirror Monster Shaggy
- Don Messick as Scooby-Doo, Scrappy-Doo
- Remy Auberjonois as Baxter
- Susan Blu as Sibella Dracula
- Hamilton Camp as Phantom Father
- Jeff B. Cohen as Grunt
- Glynis Johns as Ms. Grimwood
- Zale Kessler as Daddy Dracula, Frankenteen Sr., Vulture #2
- Ruta Lee as Revolta
- Aaron Lohr as Miguel
- Patty Maloney as Tanis
- Scott Menville as Tug
- Pat Musick as Elsa Frankenteen
- Bumper Robinson as Jamal
- Ronnie Schell as Colonel Calloway
- Marilyn Schreffler as Winnie
- Andre Stojka as The Grim Creeper, Mummy Daddy, Vulture #1
- Russi Taylor as "Phanty" Phantasma
- Frank Welker as Matches, Papa Werewolf, Well Dweller, Spider Bats, Legs, Two-Headed Shark

== Home media ==
Scooby-Doo and the Ghoul School was first released on VHS by Hanna-Barbera Home Video on October 5, 1989, and later it was released by Warner Home Video on March 6, 2001.

Warner Home Video released Scooby-Doo and the Ghoul School on DVD in Region 1 on June 4, 2002 in honor of the theatrical release of the first live-action Scooby-Doo film later that month. The film has also been released on DVD in Region 2.

A manufacture-on-demand Blu-ray was released as an individual title and as part of the Hanna-Barbera Superstars 10 boxset through Warner Archive Collection on February 20, 2024. The film was remastered in HD.

== Reception ==
Retrospective reception has been mixed. In a 2001 review, Video Librarian gave the film one star out of five, criticizing its animation, humor and characterization, although the reviewer praised its emphasis on the female monster characters. Reviewing the film's 2024 Blu-ray release, Tim Salmons of The Digital Bits gave the film a B−, considering it one of the weaker Hanna-Barbera Superstars 10 entries but praising its monster characters, horror-themed humor and familiar Scooby-Doo antics.

== Legacy ==
The five girl ghouls made their return in the OK K.O.! Let's Be Heroes episode "Monster Party", which was first released online on October 1, 2018, and aired on television on October 21. Though Scooby and Shaggy do not appear, they are briefly referenced. Russi Taylor, Susan Blu and Pat Musick reprised their roles as Phantasma, Sibella and Elsa Frankenteen, respectively, while Natalie Palamides and Kristen Li replaced Marilyn Schreffler and Patty Maloney as Winnie and Tanis. OK K.O.! creator Ian Jones-Quartey later cited the Ghoul School characters as an example of the obscure animated properties revived by the series because its production crew were fans of them, describing the show as a celebration of "animation fan energy".

== Follow-up film ==
A follow-up film, Scooby-Doo! and the Reluctant Werewolf, was released on November 13, 1988.

== See also ==
- List of films set around Halloween
