= Scooby-Doo! and the Reluctant Werewolf =

1988 film by Ray Patterson

- 2002 Promotional poster
- Created by: William Hanna; Joseph Barbera
- Based on: Characters by Hanna-Barbera Productions
- Written by: Jim Ryan
- Directed by: Ray Patterson
- Voices of: Don Messick; Casey Kasem; Hamilton Camp; B.J. Ward; Rob Paulsen; Frank Welker; Alan Oppenheimer; Pat Musick; Ed Gilbert; Mimi Seton; Jim Cummings; Joan Gerber; Brian Stokes Mitchell
- Composer: Sven Libaek
- Country of origin: United States
- Original language: English

Production
- Executive producers: William Hanna; Joseph Barbera
- Producer: Berny Wolf
- Editor: Mark Bernay
- Running time: 91 minutes
- Production company: Hanna-Barbera Productions

Original release
- Network: Syndicated
- Release: November 13, 1988

Related
- Scooby-Doo Meets the Boo Brothers; Scooby-Doo and the Ghoul School

Scooby-Doo and the Reluctant Werewolf is a 1988 animated comedy horror made-for-television film produced by Hanna-Barbera for syndication as part of the Hanna-Barbera Superstars 10 series. It marked Scrappy-Doo's last appearance as a protagonist in the Scooby-Doo franchise to date; he would not appear in a Scooby-Doo production again until the live-action Scooby-Doo film in 2002. It is also the last appearance of Shaggy's outfit from The 13 Ghosts of Scooby-Doo until Scooby-Doo and the Cyber Chase.

== Plot ==
Every year, all of the classic Hollywood monsters gather at Count Dracula's castle in Transylvania for the "Monster Road Rally", a road race whose winner is given the "Monster of the Year" award by the race's announcer, Dracula's wife and co-host, Vanna Pira. This year however, Dracula receives a postcard from one of the racing monsters, the Wolfman, stating that he has retired to Florida and thus will not be participating in any further races.

With one of the most famous monsters no longer active, Dracula fears he will have to cancel the race, until his lion-like manservant Wolfgang notifies him of a way to create a new werewolf: every five centuries, the full moon will come into the perfect position to transform a human into a werewolf for three nights. A book reveals that the one in line to become the next werewolf is Shaggy Rogers, who has won a recent race with the help of his pit crew, Scooby-Doo, his young nephew Scrappy-Doo, and the support of Shaggy's girlfriend Googie.

Dracula sends his hunchbacked henchmen, the Hunch Bunch, consisting of the posh Brunch and the slow-witted, unintelligible Crunch, on a mission to transform Shaggy into a werewolf and bring him back to his castle for the race. The first two nights, the duo is unsuccessful because of Scooby's interference, but on the final night, while Shaggy is at a drive-in movie, the Hunch Bunch successfully transforms Shaggy by dropping the sunroof of his car. Shaggy, after alternating between transformations via his hiccups, is trapped in werewolf form and transported to Transylvania.

Revealing himself, Dracula explains to Shaggy why he was transformed, but Shaggy refuses to participate in Dracula's plans. After several failed attempts to extort Shaggy, Dracula offers him a bargain; if Shaggy agrees to drive in the race and wins, Dracula will change him back to human and allow him and his friends to leave, but if he loses, he will be trapped as a werewolf forever. Without Shaggy's knowledge, Dracula plans to ensure that he does not succeed.

As Shaggy practices for the race, Dracula attempts to rig the racecourse by sending the Hunch Bunch to implement traps. Despite their efforts, Shaggy completes the course expertly. In response, Dracula alters the course, sabotages Shaggy's car, the Werewolf Wagon, and has the Hunch Bunch deprive Shaggy of sleep that night.

The next morning, Googie energizes Shaggy with a kiss and repairs his car. Throughout the race, Dracula and the monsters attempt to sabotage Shaggy and Scooby, but fail due to interference from Googie and Scrappy. Dracula unleashes his secret weapon: Genghis Kong, a giant gorilla parodying Genghis Khan and King Kong. As the other racers near the finish line, Googie and Scrappy return and rescue Shaggy and Scooby before making the beast fall onto the other monsters' cars, leaving an easy path to victory for Shaggy.

Furious to see all of his schemes have failed, Dracula reneges his deal, lying that there is no way to turn Shaggy back. After Vanna Pira reveals that the solution is in Dracula's spell book, the gang grabs the book and makes an escape. Dracula chases after them and summons a thunderstorm but is hit by lightning and falls into the ocean below, where a shark soon chases him. Shaggy and the gang escape when their car lands on an airplane.

Returning home, Googie uses the book to help change Shaggy back into a human. That night, as the gang sits down to watch another horror film while eating pizza, they fail to notice Dracula and the Hunch Bunch sneaking up to their window, swearing revenge.

== Voice cast ==
- Don Messick as Scooby-Doo and Scrappy-Doo
- Casey Kasem as Norville "Shaggy" Rogers
- B.J. Ward as Googie, Repulsa, and Woman on TV
- Hamilton Camp as Count Dracula, Police Officer, and Man in Drive-In
- Jim Cummings as Frankenstein, Dragonfly, Wolfgong, Snack Bar Manager, Genghis Kong, and Monster on TV
- Joan Gerber as Short Witch Sister and Woman at Store
- Ed Gilbert as Dr. Jackyll, Mr. Snyde, Spooky Voice, Doorknob, and the Narrator
- Brian Mitchell as Bone Jangles
- Pat Musick as Vanna Pira and Girl in Drive-In #1
- Alan Oppenheimer as Mummy and Swamp Thing
- Rob Paulsen as Brunch, Ghost, and Man in Car
- Mimi Seton as Tall Witch Sister, Girl in Drive-In #2, Boy in Drive-In, and Screamer
- Frank Welker as Crunch, Spider Monster, Plant Monster, Tyler Country Racer #1, Rooster, and Schlockness Monster

== Home media ==
The film was originally released in 1991 on VHS by Goodtimes Home Video and got re-released by Turner Home Entertainment in 1992. It was released that same year on Laserdisc by Image Entertainment. Warner Home Video re-released the film on VHS and DVD in Region 1 on March 5, 2002.

The film was released on Blu-ray on February 20, 2024, as an individual release, and as part of a Hanna-Barbera Superstars 10 boxset through Warner Archive.

== Reception ==
On Rotten Tomatoes the film holds an approval rating of 20% based on 5 reviews, with an average rating of 5.0/10.
