= The Jewel Smurfer =

17th album in the series The Smurfs

The Jewel Smurfer (Le Schtroumpfeur de bijoux)
- Cover of the French-language version
- Creator: Luc Parthoens, Thierry Culliford
- Date: November 1994
- Series: The Smurfs
- Page count: 46 pages
- Publisher: Le Lombard, Standaard Uitgeverij
- Artists: Alain Maury

Original publication
- Language: French

Chronology
- Preceded by: Finance Smurf (1992)
- Followed by: Doctor Smurf (1996)

The Jewel Smurfer (original French title: Le Schtroumpfeur de bijoux) is the seventeenth album of the original French-language Smurfs comic series. It was the first album created after the death of the Belgian artist and creator of the Smurfs, Peyo.

== Plot ==
Two humans took the jokey Smurf away... with the aim of robbing the rich inhabitants of their jewelry. They make an agreement: jokey Smurf is going to steal. "Jokey" apologizes to his victims with a note. One night, while burglarizing, the jokey Smurf found himself in the presence of the son of a Grand Duke who was actively sought and held hostage. The other Smurfs learn about the burglaries during their search for Jokey Smurf.

== See also ==
- Characters in The Smurfs
