= The Astrosmurf =

Sixth album in the series The Smurfs

- Cover of the French-language version
- Date: 1970
- Series: The Smurfs
- Page count: 62 pages
- Publisher: Dupuis

Creative team
- Writers: Peyo
- Artists: Peyo, Gos

Original publication
- Language: French
- ISBN: 2-8001-0113-X

Translation

Chronology
- Preceded by: The Smurfs and the Howlibird
- Followed by: The Smurf Apprentice

The Astrosmurf (original French title Le Cosmoschtroumpf) is the sixth album of the original French-language Smurfs comic series created by Belgian artist Peyo.

Apart from the titular one, it contains another story: The weather smurf.

== Plots ==
=== The Astrosmurf ===
There is a smurf who wants to travel to outer space, so he tries to build a rocketship, but it fails to get off the ground and so he grows moody and depressed. Papa Smurf and the other smurfs make a plan in order to cheer him up; they say him that Handy Smurf repaired the rocket and urge him to board it and become the first "Astrosmurf"; before he boards the ship, they have him toast to the voyage with spiked fruit juice, which promptly puts him to sleep. After that, the smurfs dismantle the ship and take it to a volcano, where they disguise themselves as aliens named "Swoofs", so Astrosmurf believes he has arrived to another planet.

=== The Weather Smurf ===
Handy Smurf creates a weather machine, so the smurfs use it to make a sunny day and have a picnic. Poet Smurf stays in the village to compose an ode to the Sun, while Farmer Smurf also stays, upset because the sun will dry his crops, so he decides to use the machine to make rain. When it rains, Poet Smurf uses the machine to have sun, then Farmer Smurf uses it to have rain, and so on, til the machine's controls break and it begins to make sudden weather changes (snow, winds, storms). The smurfs who are in the picnic note this, so they return to the village. After many weather-related obstacles, the smurfs reach the machine, and Papa Smurf destroys Brainy Smurf's umbrella to make a kite that, tied to the machine, receives a thunderbolt and makes the weather machine to explode. All is back to normal and the smurfs return to the village.

== Publication and other media ==
- In the Hanna-Barbera cartoon, Smurfette appears in the animated version of the stories, but not in the original comic versions.
- Gargamel appears in the animated version of "The Astrosmurf", but not in the comic. Plus, the Swoofs, who are red with white lips in the comic, are green in the cartoon due to fears of being accused for being racist.
- The animated version of “The Astrosmurf” also used some scenes adapted from “The Flying Smurf” which was one of the stories from The Black Smurfs

== See also ==
- Characters in The Smurfs
