= The Smurfs and the Book that Tells Everything =

Twenty sixth album in the series The Smurfs

The Smurfs and the Book that Tells Everything (Les Schtroumpfs et le Livre qui dit tout)
- Creator: Peyo
- Date: January 2008
- Series: The Smurfs
- Page count: 48 pages
- Publisher: Le Lombard

Chronology
- Preceded by: The Smurfs And The Bratty Kid (2007)
- Followed by: Bathing Smurfs (2009)

The Smurfs And The Book That Tells Everything (original French title: Les Schtroumpfs et le livre qui dit tout) is a Smurfs comic book story that was created and published by Studio Peyo in 2008.

== Plot summary ==
Papa Smurf leaves the Smurf Village to visit Homnibus, and Brainy Smurf decides to clean Papa Smurf's lab to surprise him, but finds a book with the pages blank save for the page number. Suddenly, the book says "hello", which scares Brainy Smurf. The book then says it can answer any question, so Brainy Smurf asks Papa Smurf's age, to test the book. The book tells Brainy Smurf to check page 36, which isn't blank anymore, and says Papa Smurf is 542 years old, which Brainy Smurf recognises is right.

After further confirming the book's knowledge, Brainy Smurf jumps happily, which calls Hefty Smurf's attention. Brainy Smurf tells him about the book, so Hefty Smurf asks the book how to become stronger, so the book sends him to page 13 where is the recipe for an ointment. Chef Smurf and Greedy Smurf hear about the book from Hefty Smurf, so Chef Smurf asks the recipe for a souffle, then Smurfette and Vanity Smurf hear Chef Smurf talking about the book, and so word is spread around the Smurf Village.

Everybody goes to Brainy Smurf to ask questions to the book, until it depletes its energy and needs a rest before answering more questions. When Brainy Smurf takes the book to his house, the other Smurfs try to take it from him, but he asks the book for a way to avert others from using it, and the book sends him to page 88 where is a voice identification spell; now Brainy Smurf is the book's guardian and nobody can ask a question without his approval (not even Jokey Smurf wearing glasses manages to trick the book).

Brainy Smurf asks the book for a quiet place where he could attend the Smurfs' questions in an ordered way, and the book guides him to the Old Tower. It needs some repairs, so Brainy Smurf asks Handy Smurf for help, and the other Smurfs help Handy Smurf in order to get into Brainy Smurf's good graces. Brainy Smurf names Dopey Smurf as his assistant, since he's obedient and lacks malice. Handy Smurf and Hefty Smurf move Brainy Smurf's stuff to the tower.

The following day, there is a long line of Smurfs at the tower's door. Each Smurf is guided by Dopey Smurf, one at a time, through a long stair, and Brainy Smurf awaits upstairs, in a new costume, where he allows the corresponding Smurf to ask the book a question.

After some time, dependence on the book escalates to a point where nobody does anything without asking the book first, and Smurfs do anything the book says; Potter Smurf digs another Smurf's garden because the book told him there was the best clay, and Vanity Smurf cuts flowers from Smurfette's garden because they are needed for a formula told by the book, for an ointment that erases wrinkles around the eyes.

Flighty Smurf doesn't know what to ask to the book, until he leaves the tower and remembers he wanted to ask for a method to improve his memory. Another Smurf asks for a way to have Smurfette love him, and the book tells him Smurfette will love him if he gathers the qualities of all the Smurfs, and this makes Brainy Smurf realise that he should ban certain questions (because Smurfette should love him). Dopey Smurf asks the book for a way to rest from his job guiding Smurfs through the stairs, and the book suggests he exchange places with Brainy Smurf from time to time, which Brainy Smurf dismisses as a joke, but at least offers to finish for that day after seeing one more Smurf. Then Jokey Smurf asks the book how could he ask it questions without Brainy Smurf being involved, so Brainy Smurf angrily closes the book and the tower is closed for the rest of the day. Chef Smurf makes lentil soup for all the Smurfs, while Brainy Smurf gets a pastry with morel mushrooms, and Dopey Smurf (who, as the assistant, also has privileges), asks a piece of melon for dessert, but the "melon" is actually a pumpkin.

Papa Smurf returns to the Smurf Village and finds the Smurfs have been using the Book That Tells Everything, and explains to Smurfette and Vanity Smurf that the book answers every question, yet without warning about the consequences of the solutions used (for example, Vanity Smurf's ointment did what the book said, but also gave him horrible button-shaped marks, so he's wearing a bag on his head, and the one that made Hefty Smurf stronger, now causes him so much pain that he needs crutches to walk).

Papa Smurf goes to the Old Tower to explain Brainy Smurf that the book is causing catastrophe and sowing discord, but Brainy Smurf believes he is just jealous.

Papa Smurf recognises he cannot convince the Smurfs that their dependence on the book is wrong, so he leaves the Smurf Village until they understand by themselves. Hefty Smurf, Smurfette and Vanity Smurf help Papa Smurf move into the cave of Mount Smurf. Smurfette returns to the cave from time to time to bring Papa Smurf some food.

Another Smurf arrives at the cave with a sick Painter Smurf, who got intoxicated making paint of a new color recommended by the book. This Smurf decides to remain in the cave with Papa Smurf, not only to help attending Painter Smurf, but also because he asked the book for a deodorant to eliminate a strange odor from his house, but the deodorant's odor caused him nausea.

Rain causes the dam to overflow. Papa Smurf discovers this and goes to the Old Tower to warn the Smurfs, but Brainy Smurf tells them that he will ask the book for a solution for the coming flood. However, the book needs a rest and everybody waits for it to recharge, much to Papa Smurf's chagrin. Then the dam breaks and everybody runs away, except for Brainy Smurf who gets caught by the flood. Smurfette tells Papa Smurf that she could not find Baby Smurf. Brainy Smurf, swimming while carrying the book, finds Baby Smurf on a little sliver of land in the torrent. Brainy Smurf doesn't know how to carry both Baby Smurf and book to safety, so he asks the book for help and it responds by telling him that it is too important and that he should give up Baby. Enraged by that prospect, Brainy tosses the book into the river before grabbing Baby Smurf and swimming to the shore.

After everybody is safe, Papa Smurf talks to Brainy Smurf about how the book can make one losing his head, but in the end Brainy Smurf took the right decision. When another Smurf adds that it was convenient to have a book with every answer anyway, Brainy Smurf gets the idea of writing a wide ensmurfopedia encompassing all the knowledge of the Smurfs.

== Notes ==
- The Old Tower looks different from the one in The Smurfs and the Howlibird, but it seems to be intended to be the same place.
- This comic features the only appearance of Potter Smurf and the first appearance of Flighty Smurf.

== See also ==
- List of The Smurfs characters
