= Finance Smurf =

16th album in the series The Smurfs

Finance Smurf (Le Schtroumpf financier)
- Cover of the French-language version
- Creator: Peyo, Thierry Culliford
- Date: November 1992
- Series: The Smurfs
- Page count: 46 pages
- Publisher: Le Lombard
- Artists: Peyo, Alain Maury, Luc Parthoens

Original publication
- Language: French

Chronology
- Preceded by: The Strange Awakening of Lazy Smurf (1991)
- Followed by: The Jewel Smurfer (1994)

Finance Smurf (original French title: Le Schtroumpf Financier) is the sixteenth album of the original French-language Smurfs comic series created by Belgian artist Peyo. It is Pierre Culliford's last comic book work before his death on December 24, 1992.

== Plot ==
Papa Smurf's lab explodes while he is making the formula "Ad Capitis mala et alios dolores sanandos", which is how much Brainy Smurf can read because he is unable to translate it properly as he claims. When the other Smurfs arrive, Papa Smurf is unconscious. A Smurf goes to the home of the good wizard Homnibus to ask for help. Homnibus realizes that Papa Smurf has fallen sick due to using sulfur in the formula. However, Homnibus lacks some ingredients needed for the cure, so he sends his servant Oliver to buy some. The Smurf goes along with Oliver and learns about money and the humans' commerce system.

The Smurf returns to the Smurf Village with medicine that Papa Smurf must drink three times a day to get better. The Smurf tries to tell Papa Smurf about money, but Papa Smurf is unable to listen to him as Papa Smurf needs rest. So the Smurf decides to put the commerce system into practice as a surprise, thus becoming Finance Smurf.

The first step is to make coins. Finance Smurf asks Painter Smurf to make a picture of Papa Smurf's face inside a circle, which is then used as a model for Sculptor Smurf to make a mold for the coins. Then Handy Smurf pours molten gold on the mold to make the first Smurf coins.

Finance Smurf arranges a conference to explain to the other Smurfs what money is and how it works. Everybody agrees with Finance Smurf's idea to use money from now on (except for Brainy Smurf). Each Smurf gets a bag of money as a start.

At first, the inexperienced Smurfs need Finance Smurf's help to know how much they need to spend or ask for given services. The inexperienced Smurfs find the currency system funny. After some time, trouble begins. While Baker Smurf, Farmer Smurf, Handy Smurf and some other Smurfs become richer, most Smurfs become poorer, They need to find ways to get money. They sell unwanted stuff that they previously did for fun (Jokey Smurf's presents, Harmony Smurf's concerts, Poet Smurf's poems, etc.).

Finance Smurf creates and manages a bank to loan money to the poor Smurfs and store the rich Smurfs' money. Farmer Smurf doesn't trust the institution and goes to bury his money in the forest, only to encounter the wizard Gargamel there. As Farmer Smurf escapes, he drops a coin, which later is picked up by the evil wizard, who realizes that the Smurfs have money.

Farmer Smurf notices that he has lost a coin. He goes back to the forest to retrieve it. When he starts to cross the bridge, it falls apart. Finance Smurf offers to finance the bridge repair cost. From then on, any Smurf who crosses the bridge needs to pay him a toll. Finance Smurf asks Handy Smurf to get the price for the materials. Carpenter Smurf asks 1500 coins for the wood, which Handy Smurf finds too expensive. Another Smurf offers him inferior wood for just 1000 coins, plus a bribe that Handy Smurf accepts.

Farmer Smurf returns to the forest to find his lost coin. Gargamel has placed a yellow-painted lead coin as bait that lures Farmer Smurf into the trap. Gargamel then sends his crow, Corbelius, with a message for the Smurfs to give him all their money in exchange for Farmer Smurf. Papa Smurf, who has recovered, sends a Smurf to spy on Gargamel, and the Smurf spy discovers the wizard setting up a trap in order to get both the Smurfs and their money. The Smurfs fix Gargamel's trap to make it fall on him instead of them. Then, while Finance Smurf and Brainy Smurf carry the money back to the Village, other Smurfs go to Gargamel's house to save Farmer Smurf from Azrael. Papa Smurf decides to have a party to celebrate their triumph, but then Finance Smurf asks who will pay for the party. In the end there's no party.

Papa Smurf learns that he will have to pay a large sum of money to Handy Smurf in order for him to rebuild his destroyed laboratory, but before he can do that he has to pay Smurfette for nursing him during his sickness, Baker Smurf for food, and other Smurfs for various other services. Thus he quickly becomes poor. When Finance Smurf suggests that he make the Smurfs pay for any kind of help he gives them, Papa Smurf soundly refuses. Papa Smurf then observes the Village and notes that all the things the Smurfs once did in a cooperative spirit are now done if they are paid only, and there are fights over money as well as stress all around due to the constant work.

One day, a Smurf gets tired of the aggravating currency-based life and decides to leave the Smurf Village. Other Smurfs agree and leave the Smurf Village with him, including Papa Smurf. Everyone leaves except for Finance Smurf, who tells them that they cannot leave because they owe him money. They responded by throwing him all the money. At first, Finance Smurf refuses to revert to the old ways and even gloats about having the whole Smurf Village for himself. Eventually, he changes his mind. He decides he doesn't want to be alone, so he asks everybody to return to the village and reuse the old system based on cooperation. The coins are converted into golden musical instruments.

== Issues ==
- The subject of the comic book is the shift from a barter system to a monetary system using coins for currency. Peyo shows us the social differences that grow between the Smurfs (rich and poor). We can also see how the lifestyle of smurfs changes, revolving around money and bringing misery everywhere.
- Although the book was never adapted for the television cartoon series, there is an episode entitled "The Smurfs and the Money Tree" which also revolves around money, namely an enchanted money tree created by Gargamel and his mother to trap the Smurfs. But because Greedy Smurf finds the tree first, instead of actual money, it turns out to carry chocolate coins wrapped in gold with Greedy's image on them.
- Since Pierre Culliford's death in 1992, his son Thierry Culliford has taken over production of the Smurf comic books, under the same pen name. He is primarily involved in writing the stories and works with various cartoonists for the illustrations.

== See also ==
- Characters in The Smurfs
