= Smurf Soup =

Tenth album in the series The Smurfs

Smurf Soup (La Soupe aux Schtroumpfs)
- Cover of the French-language version
- Creator: Peyo
- Date: January 1976
- Series: The Smurfs
- Page count: 46 pages
- Publisher: Dupuis

Original publication
- Language: French

Chronology
- Preceded by: Schtroumpf Vert et Vert Schtroumpf (1973)
- Followed by: The Olympic Smurfs (1983)

Smurf Soup (original French title: La Soupe aux Schtroumpfs) is the tenth album of the original French-language Smurfs comic series created by Belgian artist Peyo.

Apart from the titular story, it contains several one-page Smurf gags.

== Plot ==
Brainy Smurf and two other Smurfs wander through the forest. When they are near Gargamel's house, they see an ogre arriving. The ogre introduces himself to Gargamel as Bigmouth and declares he's hungry. Gargamel, driven by fear, gives him some soup, but Bigmouth is still hungry tries to eat Azrael but the wizard stops him. Observing that Bigmouth will eat anything (even candles), Gargamel decides to use him as a tool in his vengeance against the Smurfs, offering to get him some to make a soup. Luckily the three Smurfs hear this and go to the Smurf Village to warn Papa Smurf.

On their way to find the village, Gargamel and Bigmouth separate and Bigmouth follows a Smurf riding a stork to the village. There, Papa Smurf makes a plan. He makes the Smurfs behave very politely to Bigmouth, offering to make the Smurf soup he wants.

Papa Smurf makes many Smurfs distract Bigmouth (a band with music, Poet Smurf with an ode to Bigmouth, Brainy Smurf with some moral phrases, and so on) while he prepares a cream that prevents burnings.

The following day, Papa Smurf secretly calls four Smurfs. They apply the cream to themselves and then jump to the boiling water, where the cream (about which Bigmouth does not know) protects them. Papa Smurf sends Bigmouth after more wood to the fire, and while he's out, the four Smurfs leave the water, a magic formula is applied to it, and four Smurf costumes are thrown to make the giant believe that the Smurfs have dissolved into soup. When Bigmouth returns and drinks the soup, he becomes a blue monster (due to the formula), and Papa Smurf tricks him into believing that was the effect of drinking Smurf soup and that Gargamel knew all along.

Right then Gargamel arrives. He catches some Smurfs, but they aren't worried because they know Bigmouth is furious with him. When Gargamel sees the blue Bigmouth, he releases the Smurfs and tries to run, but the angry giant catches him and everybody goes to Gargamel's house to see him try to make an antidote to Bigmouth. Papa Smurf carries a little box.

All of Gargamel's tries for an antidote fail, making Bigmouth angrier, who then destroys most of the wizard's lab. Finally, Gargamel is reduced to begging Papa Smurf for help. Papa Smurf opens his box, takes out a little sarsaparilla leaf which he feeds to Bigmouth, who then returns to normal.

At the end, the Smurfs return to the village when Azrael tries to catch one of them. This Smurf calls for Bigmouth, and even though the ogre doesn't answer, Azrael runs away in fear.

== Publication and Other Media ==
- "Smurf Soup" was adapted as "Soup a la Smurf" for the Hanna-Barbera TV series. Smurfette, absent from the comic book version, appears in the animated version.
  - Although Bigmouth is as an ogre, in comic book version (and in the Polish version of most episodes of the series from the 1980s and 2021) he is called giant, even though its dimensions are approximately the same as humans.
  - Also, in the original comic book version, although Bigmouth was dimwitted, he was reasonably articulate, whereas in the cartoon series he spoke in broken English, referring to himself in the third person a lá the Incredible Hulk.
  - Originally, "Smurfs Soup" was Bigmouth's only comic book appearance, but he would later make his return comic appearance in the "Smurfs Monsters" story "Bigmouth And The Lizards" in 2014, almost 38 years after his last comic appearance.
