= The Egg and the Smurfs =

French comic book

The Egg and the Smurfs (L'Œuf et les Schtroumpfs)
- Cover of the French edition
- Date: 1968
- Series: The Smurfs
- Publisher: Dupuis

Creative team
- Writers: Peyo
- Artists: Peyo

Original publication
- Published in: Spirou magazine
- Date of publication: 1960, 1961, 1962
- Language: French
- ISBN: 2800101113

Translation

Chronology
- Preceded by: The Smurfette
- Followed by: The Smurfs and the Howlibird

The Egg and the Smurfs (original French title L'Œuf et les Schtroumpfs) is the fourth album of the original French-language Smurfs comic series created by Belgian artist Peyo.

Apart from the titular adventure, it contains two other stories: The Fake Smurf and The Hundredth Smurf.

== Plots ==
=== The Smurfs and the Egg ===
The annual event known as Smurf Day is due and Papa Smurf suggests that they make a big cake to celebrate. With great excitement, the Smurfs gather the ingredients only to find that they lack an egg. Papa Smurf therefore sends Grouchy Smurf and another Smurf to get one. After going to a lot of trouble to obtain an egg from a nearby farm, the two Smurfs face an equal struggle getting it home, only for Papa Smurf to show that the egg is a fake made of wood.

Setting off to get another egg, the two Smurfs then find one in the middle of the forest. They take it back to the village where the others try in vain to break it. It's even resistant to an axe and a frustrated Smurf expresses the wish to be turned into a hot dog if he cannot break it. When he does strike the egg he is actually turned into a hot dog and the others realise that it is a magical egg that grants them wishes when touched.

Every Smurf uses the egg to make their wishes come true: to be red or yellow-skinned, to become a giant, to have an elephant, money, cakes etc. When two Smurfs argue over who should use it first, they wish all sorts of nasty things upon the other: one Smurf wishes the other to have a big nose, a long tail and be covered in hair; while the other wishes him to have big ears, huge teeth, a long beard and be green-skinned.

As a joke by one of his Smurfs, Papa Smurf has himself been turned into a young and ordinary Smurf while three others have adopted his appearance and claim to be the genuine article. To restore order from the chaos, Papa Smurf goes to the egg and wishes that everything be the way it used to be. Everyone is turned back to normal and, before they can renew their wishes, the egg cracks open revealing a baby chick.

A Smurf reasons that the chick will become a hen and lay magic eggs. He thus sets to work building an enclosure for the chick to live in, feed and water it and keep the place tidy. After all his hard work, however, the Smurf is shattered when the chick grows up to become a non-egg laying rooster.

=== The Fake Smurf ===
The Smurfs' sworn enemy, Gargamel, creates a potion that turns him into a Smurf, his plan being to infiltrate their village and destroy them. However, the potion does not fully work since he lacks a tail, so he makes a wooden one and glues it to the back of his pants. He later finds a Smurf who, not knowing who he really is, guides him to the village.

Gargamel sets about plotting to destroy the Smurfs. He tries to mass poison them by intoxicating their midday meal but the Smurfs show no signs of suffering. Gargamel later discovers that he in fact poured the poison into a cauldron containing nothing but dirty laundry.

A bridge over the River Smurf has been completed. Gargamel sabotages it overnight, but the next day, when it is inaugurated, the Smurf walk over it without any trouble. Frustrated, Gargamel himself crosses it, only for the bridge to collapse when he is halfway along. He falls into the river and is rescued. Papa Smurf later discovers evidence of sabotage.

The dunking loosens Gargamel's glued tail which is later found by a Smurf. Realising that there is a false Smurf in their midst, Papa Smurf orders the tails of every Smurf to be pulled for checking. Discovered without a tail, Gargamel rushes to Papa Smurf's laboratory and barricades himself in, announcing his intention to brew a potion that will transform him back into a human and enable him to lay waste to the village. The Smurfs break into the lab just as he is drinking the potion but, although he recovers his looks, Gargamel is still the same size as the Smurfs and is easily taken prisoner.

Begging for mercy, he is tied up with rope and taken outside the village where Papa Smurf approaches him with a knife. Gargamel pleads further, only to find Papa Smurf cutting his ropes and ordering him to leave. Gargamel hastens off, but, once well clear of the village, swears revenge once more.

=== The Hundredth Smurf ===
Papa Smurf realises that they are due to perform the Dance of the Moon which is held every 654 years. A hundred Smurfs are required for the ceremony but there are only 99 Smurfs in the village and Papa Smurf is at a loss as to how to make up the required number.

Meanwhile, Vanity Smurf decides to make himself a large mirror. Since the process of hammering and polishing the required sheet of metal proves to be unbearably noisy, and he insists on working through the night, the other Smurfs demand that he continue in the forest. Vanity finishes his mirror but is then caught in a storm. Sheltering under a tree, he is admiring himself in his new mirror when it is struck by lightning. The mirror disappears but Vanity's reflection has come to life!

The reflection does and says the same things as Vanity: the only problem being that his physical actions are still those of a mirror image and he speaks in reverse. They thus both hurry back to the village. Papa Smurf thinks the reflection is the hundredth Smurf he needs for the Dance of the Moon, but the reflection sings and dances backwards which ruins the rehearsals. Papa Smurf's attempts to make him act like a normal Smurf are in vain.

Vanity takes the reflection back to his house but since they do the same things at the same time they end up having to squeeze through the door, eat from the same bowl, sleep in the same bed (which results in a sleepless night) and use the same towel, which is ripped by both Smurfs pulling at it. This series of incidents causes them to fight but then the reflection hits the wall and is knocked unconscious by a cauldron falling from the shelf above him.

Vanity takes advantage to lock his double outside the house. Their synchronism has now been broken and the reflection is now able to move around of his own accord. However, he still speaks in reverse and cannot fit in with the rest of the village. Sad and lonely, he wanders the forest where he finds the mirror from which he came from. The reflection tries to re-enter the mirror but instead goes right through it. However, he has now reflected again, becoming a real Smurf who can act and speak normally. He is thus made welcome by the other Smurfs.

Relieved, Papa Smurf returns home only to find a double of himself talking in gibberish and performing the same actions as him. He is horrified at the idea that they are now 101 Smurfs, but, on closer inspection, discovers that it is in fact Jokey Smurf in disguise. Papa Smurf kicks him out of his house. That night, the Dance of the Moon is held as a double celebration.

== Revelations made in the stories ==
In the original French version of The Egg and the Smurfs, it's revealed that Grouchy Smurf's moody and unsociable personality is due to the lasting effects of the fly that stung him in The Black Smurfs.

== Publication history ==
The three stories were published in Spirou magazine between 1960 and 1962 and appeared together in book form in 1968.

English versions of the book were published by Dupuis in Canada, Random House in the United States and Hodder & Stoughton in the UK. These publications only included the stories The Egg and the Smurfs and The Hundredth Smurf.

== In other media ==
All three stories were animated, but with notable changes in the storylines:

- In the animated version of The Egg and the Smurfs (The Magic Egg), the magic egg is a creation of Gargamel which is stolen and lost by Bigmouth the ogre. After the chaos it causes (Including Papa Smurf turning into a monkey and Clumsy turning into a giant thanks to Brainy, Handy and Poet all wishing to be like Papa Smurf), Papa Smurf gets rid of the egg simply by wishing it to disappear. Later, Jokey Smurf "finds" it again and all the Smurfs hover around it, trying to make wishes, only for the egg to explode in their faces, Jokey having made a fake magic egg and placed firecrackers and other explosives inside it.
- Also in The Magic Egg, Hefty Smurf turns into a sausage instead of a hot dog after hitting the magic egg with a mallet.
- In the animated version of The Fake Smurf it is the witch Hogatha, rather than Gargamel, who becomes the false Smurf.
- In the animated version of The Hundredth Smurf, the Dance is part of a ritual to prevent the village from facing a hundred years of bad luck, symptoms of which are already taking effect. A hundred Smurfs are still required, however, and the reflection becomes a regular Smurf when he and the mirror are again struck by lightning.
- Smurfette appears in all three adaptations, unlike the originals.

== See also ==
- Characters in The Smurfs
