= King Smurf =

Comic book

King Smurf (Le Schtroumpfissime)
- Date: 23 September 1965
- Series: The Smurfs
- Page count: 64 pages
- Publisher: Dupuis

Creative team
- Writers: Peyo and Yvan Delporte
- Artist: Peyo

Original publication
- Published in: Spirou magazine
- Date of publication: 1964
- Language: French

Translation
- Publisher: Dupuis & Granger Frères Limitée
- Date: 1978

Chronology
- Preceded by: The Purple Smurfs (1963)
- Followed by: The Smurfette (1967)

King Smurf (original French title: Le Schtroumpfissime) is the second comic book adventure of the Smurfs, and the name of the main fictional character who assumes power in the absence of Papa Smurf. The story was written and drawn by Peyo with Yvan Delporte as co-writer.

== Publication history ==
The adventure of King Smurf first started in Spirou magazine in 1964 as Le Schtroumpfissime (cf. illustrissimo — most illustrious — a term sometimes used to flatter European monarchs of the medieval and Renaissance period). While not the second story to appear in Spirou, it was the titular story to be published in book format.

In the original French book edition from 1965, the comic contains two stories, the titular one and Schtroumphonie en Ut, a story about the frustrated efforts of a Smurf to make some acceptable music and being tricked by Gargamel into playing an enchanted musical instrument which has a disastrous effect on his fellow Smurfs.

An English Canadian edition appeared in 1978 by Dupuis in collaboration with Granger Frères Limitée. A later edition was published by Random House. The English edition of the comic appeared in 1997, published by Hodder & Stoughton.

Other translations appeared in German, Dutch, Spanish, Italian, Danish, Polish, Catalan, Chinese and Swedish.

== Plot summary ==
=== The Smurf King ===
King Smurf is a regular Smurf whose actual name and position is never stated in the original adventure in which he is the titular main character.

When Papa Smurf leaves the village for a few weeks in order to get some Euphorbia leaves, which he needs to complete an herbal potion for undisclosed use, the Smurfs are left with no leader. Arguments ensue when each Smurf claims the post, and are only resolved by the decision to have a vote, though everybody intends to vote for themselves.

One unnamed Smurf uses demagogic tactics, and makes promises to almost all the Smurfs, who agree to vote for him. He puts up posters, holds a parade, makes self-praising election speeches, and offers rounds of raspberry juice. Soon, the only other candidate remaining is Brainy Smurf who, as usual, simply claims that he is the only suitable Smurf since, according to himself only, "Papa Smurf always said so".

The Smurf thus wins with 97 votes — two of the other three votes go to Brainy Smurf, supported by himself and Dopey Smurf: the winning Smurf had told Dopey Smurf to vote for Brainy Smurf, expecting him to get it wrong when it came to the actual vote. The other is a spoiled ballot.

The winning Smurf then proceeds to put on golden-coloured clothes and asks the others to refer to him as "King Smurf". To his anger, the Smurfs laugh off his pretence. Instead he resolves to teach them their place and becomes increasingly authoritarian. The Smurfs begin to despise him as he becomes corrupted by power: King Smurf imposes a repressive regime and installs an armed troop of guards, led by Hefty Smurf, punishing all opposition. He forces the Smurfs into building him a palace. When a present from Jokey explodes on King Smurf, Jokey is promptly imprisoned as a warning.

The only Smurf to show King Smurf any real support is Brainy Smurf, but, because he has no strong convictions and also upset by the treatment of Jokey he later joins a growing resistance movement. The rebels (joined by an escaped Jokey Smurf) base themselves in the forest, insulting and provoking King Smurf from a distance. By offering the other Smurfs gold medals, King Smurf mounts an expedition into the forest to confront the rebellion, but it ends in failure: the rebels get more recruits in the process.

To prevent any more defections, King Smurf has the village surrounded by a wooden wall. When he refuses to abdicate, the rebels attack the village. King Smurf's troops fight back by pelting the attackers with tomatoes.

The rebels eventually break through the wooden wall, and a full-scale battle ensues, causing widespread destruction. During the fight, a rebel takes explosives from Papa Smurf's laboratory and blows up King Smurf's castle. King Smurf is left helpless, with only his guards to support him. In spite of this, he defiantly refuses to stand down, and a final confrontation seems inevitable, but at that moment, Papa Smurf returns from his journey and demands an explanation for the conflict.

The sudden return of paternal authority brings an immediate end to the battle, and the embarrassed Smurfs explain themselves to Papa Smurf. He is angry with them for "behaving like humans", but mostly puts the blame on King Smurf. Extremely remorseful, ex-King Smurf announces his abdication and returns to his old home. He takes a bucket and a broom, and promises to clean up the damaged village. Smurfs feel sorry for him, and offer their help, saying that the destruction was also their fault and that they still liked him. Ex-King Smurf is touched by this, and seeing this, Papa Smurf forgives them all.

King Smurf's outfit is then used for a scarecrow.

=== Smurphony in C ===
An unnamed Smurf is rejected from the village orchestra since he plays badly every instrument (even the triangle!). He meets a strange fairy who gives him a magic instrument, the "turlusiphon", which always plays well. However, when the Smurf plays the turlusiphon to the other smurfs, they fall asleep. The Smurf discovers the fairy was really Gargamel in disguise and goes to Gargamel's laboratory to find the cure for the turlusiphon-induced sleep, and faces both Gargamel and his cat Azrael. Sadly, Gargamel's books say there is no known cure for the turlusiphon. Angry, the Smurf kicks the turlusiphon into the chimney and leaves Gargamel's home. At the village, Harmony (as the Smurf now calls himself) takes his old trumpet and decides to play a requiem for his fellow Smurfs. The miracle happens when his music is so awful that it awakens the Smurfs. The Smurfs decide to accept him at the orchestra due to his heroism, but they still cover their ears when he plays.

== In other media ==
When the story was made into an animated cartoon, it is Brainy Smurf who becomes King Smurf. "His Majesty's" disastrous forest-campaign is eliminated; Brainy's palace is destroyed not by a bomb, but by a flood when the dam on the River Smurf breaks. Ultimately, Brainy spells out the episode's moral, that "being a good leader means more than just giving orders."

In the animated version of Smurphony in C, the melody of the smurphony is based on a Beethoven gavotte. Furthermore, the instrument the "fairy" (Gargamel) offers Harmony is called a "shazala-kazoo".

== See also ==
- Characters in The Smurfs
