= The Smurf Apprentice =

Seventh album in the series The Smurfs

The Smurf Apprentice (L'Apprenti Schtroumpf)
- Cover of the French-language version
- Creator: Peyo
- Date: January 1971
- Series: The Smurfs
- Page count: 54 pages
- Publisher: Dupuis

Original publication
- Language: French

Chronology
- Preceded by: The Astrosmurf (1970)
- Followed by: Histoires de Schtroumpfs (1972)

The Smurf Apprentice (original French title L'Apprenti Schtroumpf) is the seventh album of the original French-language Smurfs comic series created by Belgian artist Peyo.

In addition to the titular story, the album contains two other stories: Smurftraps and Romeo and Smurfette.

== Plots ==
=== The Smurf Apprentice ===
A Smurf wishes to learn magic and alchemy. After several failed attempts to obtain Papa Smurf's magic book, he goes to Gargamel's lab and steals a page from his spellbook. However, the effects of the potion described on the stolen page are detailed only on the next page, making testing the only way to discover its purpose. After several failed attempts to administer the potion to other Smurfs, the Apprentice Smurf drinks it himself and is transformed into a green, lizard-like monster that frightens the other Smurfs (except for Papa Smurf). None of Papa Smurf's attempts to create an antidote are successful, so the Apprentice Smurf returns to Gargamel's lab seeking an antidote, only to be captured. Papa Smurf leads the other Smurfs on a rescue mission, where they obtain the antidote that restores the Apprentice Smurf to his normal Smurf appearance.

=== Smurftraps ===
Gargamel lays a series of traps to capture the Smurfs while they are playing hide-and-seek. Brainy Smurf is trapped by a book, Greedy Smurf is immobilized by a sticky cake, Grouchy Smurf follows directions leading him to a hole, and others fall victim to similar schemes. The Smurf who was counting witnesses Gargamel capture the last of his playmates and returns to the village to inform Papa Smurf, who then organizes the remaining Smurfs for a rescue mission. However, Gargamel captures the entire rescue party, except for Papa Smurf, with a giant net. Gargamel forces the Smurfs into slave labor at his home, but Papa Smurf arrives that night and leaves a trail of gold coins near Gargamel's bed. When Gargamel awakens, he finds the trail and follows it to a chest where Papa Smurf traps him. Papa Smurf releases the Smurfs, and they escape Gargamel's home.

=== Romeo and Smurfette ===
A series of one-page gags showing the affection all the Smurfs feel for Smurfette.

== Publication and other media ==
- In the Hanna-Barbera cartoon version of The Smurf Apprentice, Clumsy Smurf is the one who becomes the apprentice rather than the unnamed Smurf from the comic.
- The animated version of Romeo and Smurfette links the gags into a single story, where Gargamel (who does not appear in any of the original gags) uses a magic flower to influence Smurfette to choose to marry either Handy Smurf or Hefty Smurf, thus dividing the Smurfs into factions supporting each. The episode also uses some scenes adapted from Smurf Versus Smurf.

== See also ==
- Characters in The Smurfs
