= The Smurfs and the Howlibird =

The Smurfs and the Howlibird (Les Schtroumpfs et le Cracoucass)
- Cover of the French edition
- Date: 1969
- Series: The Smurfs
- Publisher: Dupuis

Creative team
- Writers: Peyo
- Artists: Peyo, Gos

Original publication
- Language: French
- ISBN: 2-8001-0112-1

Translation

Chronology
- Preceded by: The Egg and the Smurfs
- Followed by: Le Cosmoschtroumpf

The Smurfs and the Howlibird (original French title Les Schtroumpfs et le Cracoucass) is the fifth album of the original French-language Smurfs comic series created by Belgian artist Peyo.

Apart from the titular one, it contains other story: The Smurf not Like the Others.

== Plots ==
=== The Smurfs and the Howlibird ===
Papa Smurf tries to create a new fertilizer, but it transforms an ordinary flower into a smurfivore plant. After destroying the plant, two smurfs try to get rid of the fertilizer throwing it in a lonely place. However, a baby bird swallows it and becomes a huge, destructive monster named the "Howlibird". The Howlibird destroys the smurf village and the smurfs escape to an old tower. There, Handy Smurf suggest to repair an old crossbow to throw rocks to the Howlibird. Papa Smurf goes to his lab in the village to get an explosive which, when thrown by the crossbow, blows the Howlibird's feathers. Then, Papa Smurf defeats the Howlibird with bullfighting techniques, and uses a formula stolen from Gargamel's lab to make the Howlibird to shrink. Some time later, while the smurfs are repairing the village, the Howlibird reappears with regrown feathers, but with his current size he is not a menace anymore.

=== The Smurf Not Like the Others ===
While all smurfs live happily in the village, one smurf unlike the others just wants to seek new horizons, so he says it to Papa Smurf. Despite the efforts of many smurfs (like Greedy Smurf and Jokey Smurf), he still leaves, but Papa Smurf gives him a magic whistle that will return him to the village if he's in danger. During his travels, the smurf is found and captured by Gargamel, who, not knowing what the whistle does, uses it and arrives to the smurf village. There, Gargamel tries to capture the smurfs, but Papa Smurf gives him a serum that makes him good and nice for a while. Then, Gargamel and the smurfs go to Gargamel's house to save the prisoner smurf, and arrive just in time to save him from Azrael. However, the serum that made Gargamel good wears off and Gargamel captures all the smurfs. Luckily, a smurf has taken the magic whistle, so the smurfs hang one to another while Papa Smurf uses the whistle, and all smurfs return to the village. The Smurf Not Like the Others decides that nothing is better than stay in the safety of the village.

== Publication and other media ==
- Smurfette appears in the Hanna-Barbera animated version of the stories, but not in the original comic versions.
- In the animated version of "The Smurfs and the Howlibird", Gargamel doesn't appear, and, rather than taking a formula from his lab, Papa Smurf creates an antidote with the remains of the fertilizer.
- In the animated version of "The Smurf Not Like the Others", the title smurf is identified as Dreamy Smurf, the same smurf who would become Astrosmurf(the title of the episode is Dreamy's Nightmare).
- A running gag in "The Smurfs and the Howlibird" is that a smurf's hanged clothes were destroyed by the Howlibird, so he has to use a towel and asks Papa Smurf for some pants in the most inopportune moments.

== See also ==
- Characters in The Smurfs
