= The Purple Smurfs =

First album of The Smurfs comic

The Purple Smurfs (Les Schtroumpfs noirs)
- Cover of the French edition
- Creator: Peyo
- Date: 30 November 1963
- Series: The Smurfs
- Page count: 64 pages
- Publisher: Dupuis

Original publication
- Published in: Spirou magazine
- Issues: 1107
- Date of publication: 2 July 1959
- Language: French

Chronology
- Followed by: King Smurf (1965)

The Purple Smurfs (original French title: Les Schtroumpfs noirs, "The Black Smurfs") is the first album of the original French-language Smurfs comic series created by Belgian artist Peyo. It was first published as an album in 1963, but the stories it contained had already been published in Spirou magazine. The main story Les Schtroumpfs noirs was first published in number 1107 (July 2, 1959) as the first "mini-récit" in the magazine. This was a special supplemental page which readers would remove and fold up in order to create a small booklet. Mini-récits were not included when the issues of Spirou were collected in the quarterly hardcover volumes, so this story is absent from volume 72 of Spirou, though the page containing instructions for creating the booklet is there.

Apart from the titular one, it contains two other stories: The Flying Smurf (Le Schtroumpf Volant) and The Smurfnapper (Le Voleur de Schtroumpfs).

== Plots ==
=== The Purple Smurfs ===
In a little mushroom village live the Smurfs, diminutive blue-skinned humanoids. One day, one of them gets bitten by a purple fly (a black fly in the original) that turns his skin purple (jet-black in the original), reduces his vocabulary to the single word "gnap!", and causes him to go angry and berserk. He bounces around and bites other Smurfs on their tail, which turns them into evil Purple Smurfs as well. Soon, almost everyone in the village has become a nasty Purple Smurf, and Papa Smurf, the leader, tries to find a cure and cease the tail-biting epidemic. The cure is found in magnolia pollen, which is gathered in great quantity and loaded in fireplace bellows to be used as impromptu ranged weapons against contaminated Smurfs. The Purple Smurf has to inhale the pollen, which, after a loud and powerful sneeze, causes him to revert to his usual blue-skinned bonhomie. A great battle is fought outside the village, as the purple tail-biting horde closes in, threatening to destroy Smurf civilization for good.

The first Purple Smurf to have been transformed, meanwhile, recovers some semblance of ingenuity and paints himself blue to avoid being sprayed by the pollen-powered antidote. This allows him to ambush several normal Smurfs and reverse the outcome of the clash. In the end, only Papa Smurf still stands. He rushes to the lab to reload his bellows but is bitten while doing so. As he turns, he lets the large pollen jar fall into the fire, which causes the whole lab to explode. The resulting pollen cloud descends on the raving Purple Smurfs, reverting them to normality once and for all.

This is the only Smurfs comic books where a Smurf is seen without a hat. Papa Smurf has his blown away by the final explosion, revealing a bald head. In a later adventure, "The Egg and the Smurfs", it is revealed that Grouchy Smurf's moody and unsociable personality is because of the lasting effects of the fly that bit him.

This story was later used as the basis for an episode of the Hanna-Barbera Smurfs cartoon, though their skin color was changed from black to purple, in order to avoid possible racial connotations. In the cartoon, Lazy Smurf is bitten by the fly first, and then bites Hefty. Hefty is the one who paints himself blue to avoid being sprayed by the antidote, and later causes the fire who makes the pollen jar explode (though this takes a while to happen, which gives time to Hefty to bite Papa Smurf and seemingly turn every Smurf purple).

==== Zombies ====
Followers of zombie fiction have remarked the similarities between the plot of The Black Smurfs and that of George A. Romero's 1968 film Night of the Living Dead, which introduced a new archetype of zombies that would be later used in other fiction works: plagues of zombies that infect the living people, turning them violent, irrational and uncontrolled, as the black Smurfs. However, there had been other fictional works that could also be considered precedents of this zombie archetype.

=== The Flying Smurf ===
A blue Smurf desperately wishes to be able to fly in the air, and tries various means to defy gravity and accomplish his dream, such as sticking feathers to his arms, building a hot-air balloon and eating a lot of yeast.

=== The Smurfnapper ===
A reclusive sorcerer, Gargamel, wants to create the philosopher's stone. In his magic recipe book, he finds out that one of the ingredients for making it is a Smurf. He succeeds in catching a Smurf and locks him up in a cage. Papa Smurf and the others quickly go to rescue the imprisoned Smurf, but opening the cage proves a case of easier said than done.

This is Gargamel's first appearance in the Smurfs canon, and his motive for stealing Smurfs is made clear here, although it was slightly inconsistent in later stories and adaptations.

== Publication ==
The comic was re-released in 2010 for the US market as "The Purple Smurfs" by Papercutz in September 2010, with artist Diego Jourdan Pereira in charge of the re-coloring (and partly redrawing) of all black smurfs into purple ones with red eyes. Translated by Joe Johnson, this contains a different third story, called The Smurf and His Neighbors. The Smurfnapper was instead issued in a special preview comic published by Papercutz in July 2010.

== Reception ==
The book received positive reviews.

== See also ==
- Characters in The Smurfs
- Jynx, a Pokémon that was also recolored from black to purple for racial reasons
