= The Smurfs (comics) =

Belgian comics series by Peyo

Les Schtroumpfs (The Smurfs)
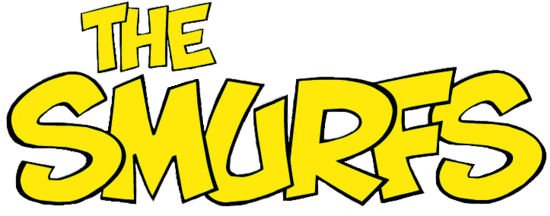
- Date: 1958–present
- No. of issues: 41
- Main characters: Papa Smurf, Smurfette, Brainy Smurf, Gargamel
- Publisher: Dupuis (1958-1988); Cartoon Creation (self-published; 1990-1991); Le Lombard (1992-present)

Creative team
- Writers: Peyo and Studio Peyo
- Artists: Peyo and Studio Peyo
- Creator: Peyo

Original publication
- Published in: Spirou magazine
- Date of publication: October 23, 1958
- Language: French

Chronology
- Preceded by: Johan and Peewit

The Smurfs (French: Les Schtroumpfs; Dutch: De Smurfen) is a Belgian comic series, created by cartoonist Peyo (pen name of Pierre Culliford). The titular creatures were introduced as supporting characters in an already established series, Johan and Peewit in 1958, and starred in their own series from 1959.

More than 40 Smurf comic albums have been created, 16 of them by Peyo. Originally, the Smurf stories appeared in Spirou magazine with reprints in many different magazines, but after Peyo left the publisher Dupuis, many comics were first published in dedicated Smurf magazines, which existed in French, Dutch and German. A number of short stories and one page gags have been collected in comic books next to the regular series. By 2008, Smurf comics have been translated into 25 languages, and some 25 million albums have been sold.

== History ==
In 1952, Peyo created a series in Spirou magazine titled Johan et Pirlouit (Johan and Peewit), set in Europe during the (probably) Middle Ages. Johan serves as a brave young page to the king, and Pirlouit (pronounced Peer-loo-ee) functions as his sidekick.

On 23 October 1958, Peyo introduced a new set of characters to the Johan et Pirlouit story "La Flûte à six trous" (tr. "The Flute with Six Holes"). This alone caused no great excitement, as the brave duo constantly encountered strange new people and places. This time, they had the mission of recovering a magic flute, which required some sorcery by the wizard Homnibus. And in this manner, they met a tiny, blue-skinned humanoid creature in white clothing called a "Schtroumpf," followed by his numerous peers who looked just like him, with an elderly leader who wore red clothing and had a white beard called Grand Schtroumpf" (Papa Smurf).

First appearance of Smurfs in The Flute with Six Holes, the ninth album (1958) of the Johan and Peewit-series

Although intended to be secondary characters who were only to appear in the single episode, the characters proved to be a huge success, and the first independent spin-off Smurf stories appeared in Spirou in 1959, together with the first merchandising. The short Smurf stories were published as mini books, where the story was printed on a large page and had to be folded and cut by the reader into a small book.

A few years later, the first adventures were redrawn with a graphic design that made the characters more graceful. The stories became longer and were republished in full in a hardback version.

== Volumes ==
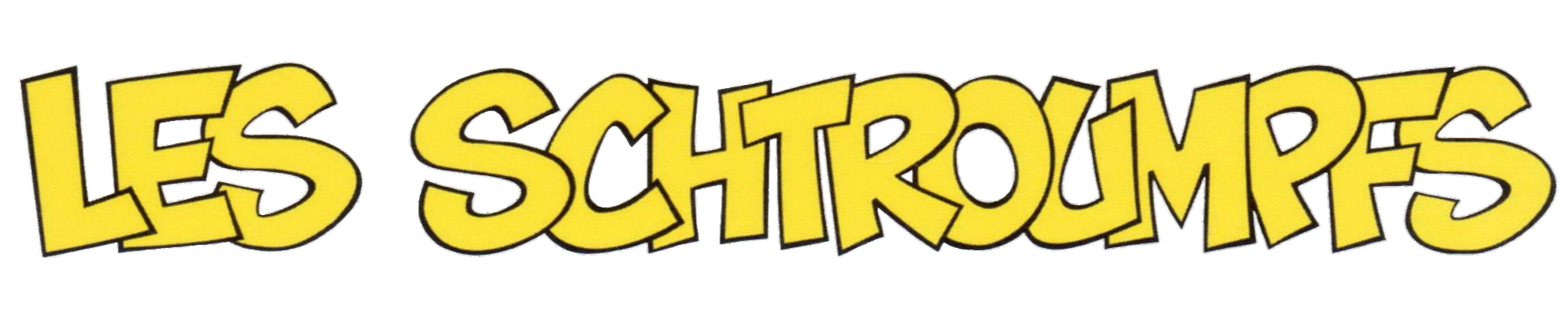
Original logo (Belgian French)

This is the list of the original French-language comic issues. Some of them are anthologies of several stories. A number of them were translated into English by Anthea Bell and Derek Hockridge, and published by Hodder & Stoughton (Random House in the USA). The late comic artist Pascal Garray contributed to seventeen editions of The Smurf comics between 1990 and 2017. Garray's last comic, Les Schtroumpfs et les haricots Mauves, was released in September 2017.

=== Johan and Peewit appearances ===
9. La flûte à six schtroumpfs (originally titled as La flûte à six trous)
10. La guerre des sept fontaines
12. Le pays maudit
13. Le sortilège de Maltrochu
14. La horde du corbeau
16. La nuit des sorciers

=== Original series ===
No.	Title	Publisher	Release date	ISBN
1	Les Schtroumpfs noirs (The Black Smurfs)	Dupuis	30 November 1963	ISBN 2-8001-0108-3
2	Le Schtroumpfissime (The Smurf King, English title)	Dupuis	23 September 1965	ISBN 2-8001-0109-1
3	La Schtroumpfette (The Smurfette)	Dupuis	16 March 1967	ISBN 2-8001-0110-5
4	L'Œuf et les Schtroumpfs (The Smurfs and the Egg)	Dupuis	26 March 1968	ISBN 2-8001-3969-2
5	Les Schtroumpfs et le Cracoucass (The Smurfs and the Howlibird, English title)	Dupuis	25 September 1969	ISBN 2-8001-0112-1
6	Le Cosmoschtroumpf (The Astrosmurf)	Dupuis	5 November 1970	ISBN 2-8001-0113-X
7	L'Apprenti Schtroumpf (The Smurf Apprentice)	Dupuis	18 November 1971	ISBN 2-8001-0114-8
8	Histoires de Schtroumpfs (Stories of the Smurfs, an anthology of one-page humorous stories)	Dupuis	9 November 1972	ISBN 2-8001-0115-6
9	Schtroumpf Vert et Vert Schtroumpf (Smurf Versus Smurf)	Dupuis	13 September 1973	ISBN 2-8001-0324-8
10	La Soupe aux Schtroumpfs (The Smurf Soup)	Dupuis	6 December 1976	ISBN 2-8001-0510-0
11	Les Schtroumpfs Olympiques (The Olympic Smurfs)	Dupuis	3 February 1983	ISBN 2-8001-0769-3
12	Le Bébé Schtroumpf (The Baby Smurf)	Dupuis	27 November 1984	ISBN 2-8001-1148-8
13	Les P'tits Schtroumpfs (The Smurflings)	Dupuis	1 April 1988	ISBN 2-8001-1569-6
14	L'Aéroschtroumpf (The Aerosmurf)	Cartoon Creation/Le Lombard,	17 October 1990	ISBN 2-87345-000-2
15	L'Étrange Réveil du Schtroumpf Paresseux (The Strange Awakening of Lazy Smurf)	Cartoon Creation/Le Lombard	1 January 1991	ISBN 2-8036-1234-8
16	Le Schtroumpf Financier (The Finance Smurf)	Le Lombard	1 January 1992	ISBN 2-8036-1454-5

Albums made after the death of Peyo, with help from his son Thierry Culliford (born 1956):

17. Le Schtroumpfeur de Bijoux (The Jewel Smurfer), Le Lombard, 01/01/1994, ISBN 2-8036-1098-1
18. Docteur Schtroumpf (Doctor Smurf), Le Lombard, 01/01/1996, ISBN 2-8036-1216-X
19. Le Schtroumpf Sauvage (The Wild Smurf), Le Lombard, 11/01/1998, ISBN 2-8036-1351-4
20. La Menace Schtroumpf (Attack of the Grey Smurfs), Le Lombard, 11/01/2000, ISBN 2-8036-1516-9
21. On ne Schtroumpfe pas le Progrès (You Don't Smurf Progress), Le Lombard, 11/01/2002, ISBN 2-8036-1773-0
22. Le Schtroumpf Reporter (The Reporter Smurf), Le Lombard, 11/01/2003, ISBN 2-8036-1900-8
23. Les Schtroumpfs Joueurs (The Gambling Smurfs), Le Lombard, 01/01/2005, ISBN 2-8036-2005-7
24. Salade de Schtroumpfs (Salad Smurfs), Le Lombard, 01/13/2006, ISBN 2-8036-2154-1
25. Un Enfant chez les Schtroumpfs (The Smurfs And The Bratty Kid), Le Lombard, 01/12/2007, ISBN 978-2-8036-2242-9
26. Les Schtroumpfs et le livre qui dit tout (The Smurfs and the Book that Tells Everything), Le Lombard, 01/18/2008, ISBN 978-2-8036-2382-2
27. Schtroumpfs les bains (Smurfs in Paradise), Le Lombard, 04/3/2009, ISBN 978-2-8036-2521-5
28. La Grande Schtroumpfette (The Grand Smurfette), Le Lombard, 04/16/2010, ISBN 978-2-8036-2648-9
29. Les Schtroumpfs et l'Arbre d'Or (The Smurfs and the Golden Tree), Le Lombard, 04/08/2011, ISBN 978-2-8036-2807-0
30. Les Schtroumpfs de L'Ordre (The Law and Order of The Smurfs), Le Lombard, 03/23/2012, ISBN 978-2-8036-3052-3
31. Les Schtroumpfs à Pilulit (Chicken-Fried Smurfs), Le Lombard, 04/19/2013, ISBN 9782803632558
32. Les Schtroumpfs et L'Amour Sorcier (The Smurfs and the Sorcerer's Love), Le Lombard, 04/04/2014, ISBN 9782803634156
33. Schtroupf Le Héros (Smurf Heroes), Le Lombard, 03/13/2015, ISBN 9782803635436
34. Les Schtroumpfs Et Le Demi-Genie (The Smurfs and the Half-Genie), Le Lombard, 04/01/2016, ISBN 9782803636907
35. Les Schtroumpfs Et Les Haricots Mauves (The Smurfs and the Purple Beans), Le Lombard, 08/18/2017, ISBN 9782803671144
36. Les Schtroumpfs Et Le Dragon Du Lac (The Smurfs and the Dragon of the Lake), Le Lombard, 03/02/2018, ISBN 9782803672844
37. Les Schtroumpfs Et La Machine à Rêver (The Smurfs and the Dream Machine), Le Lombard, 04/05/2019, ISBN 9782803673131
38. Les Schtroumpfs Et Le Vol Des Cigognes (The Smurfs and the Flight of the Storks), Le Lombard, 2020.
39. Les Schtroumpfs et la tempête blanche, Le Lombard, 10/08/2021.
40. Les Schtroumpfs et les Enfants perdus, Le Lombard, 2022.
41. Gargamel, l'Ami des Schtroumpfs, Le Lombard, 10/13/2023.
42. Les Schtroumpfs et la cape magique, Le Lombard, 2024.

43. Le Trophée des Schtroumpfs, Le Lombard, 8/29/2025

44. Le Schtroumpf qui plantait de la salsepareille, Le Lombard, 11/6/2026

=== Les Schtroumpfs et le Village des Filles (The Smurfs and the Village of Girls) ===
Albums featuring the Smurfy Grove Smurfs from Smurfs: The Lost Village.

1. La Forêt interdite (The Forbidden Forest), Le Lombard, 04/24/2017, ISBN 9782803671168
2. La trahison de Bouton d'Or (The Betrayal of Smurfblossom), Le Lombard, 08/24/2018 ISBN 9782803673223
3. Le Corbeau (Smurfs) (The Raven), Le Lombard, 10/31/2019 ISBN 9782803673148
4. Un nouveau départ (A New Beginning), Le Lombard, 11/24/2020 ISBN 9782803677160
5. Le Bâton de saule, Le Lombard, 2022.
6. L'île vagabonde, Le Lombard, 2023.

=== Look-In magazine strips ===
In the 1970s and '80s, the British children's magazine Look-In ran an original series of one-page comic-strip tales called "Meet the Smurfs."

=== Marvel Comics ===
In 1982 Marvel Comics released a Three issue mini series featuring full length stories and one page gags featuring The Smurfs. Marvel Comics also published a large format comic book as well as six mini comic books with a full length story in each comic book.

=== Papercutz graphic novels ===
Since August 2010, Papercutz has been issuing Smurfs comics, translated by Joe Johnson. Following a special preview comic in July 2010 that contained the story "The Smurfnapper," the following graphic novels have been issued to date:

1. The Purple Smurfs (August 31, 2010, ISBN 978-1-59707-207-6)
2. The Smurfs and the Magic Flute (August 31, 2010, ISBN 978-1-59707-209-0)
3. King Smurf (November 23, 2010, ISBN 978-1-59707-225-0)
4. The Smurfette (January 18, 2011, ISBN 978-1-59707-237-3)
5. The Smurfs and the Egg (March 15, 2011, ISBN 978-1-59707-247-2)
6. The Smurfs and the Howlibird (May 10, 2011, ISBN 978-1-59707-261-8)
7. The Astrosmurf (August 2, 2011, ISBN 978-1-59707-251-9)
8. The Smurf Apprentice (September 27, 2011, ISBN 978-1-59707-280-9)
9. Gargamel and the Smurfs (November 22, 2011, ISBN 978-1-59707-290-8)
10. The Return of the Smurfette (January 17, 2012, ISBN 978-1-59707-293-9)
11. The Smurf Olympics (March 27, 2012, ISBN 978-1-59707-302-8)
12. Smurf Versus Smurf (August 7, 2012, ISBN 978-1-59707-321-9)
13. Smurf Soup (November 13, 2012, ISBN 978-15970-7359-2)
14. The Baby Smurf (March 5, 2013, ISBN 978-1-59707-382-0)
15. The Smurflings (May 14, 2013, ISBN 978-1-59707-407-0)
16. The Aerosmurf (August 6, 2013, ISBN 978-1-59707-426-1)
17. The Strange Awakening of Lazy Smurf (March 25, 2014, ISBN 978-1-59707-510-7)
18. The Finance Smurf (July 1, 2014, ISBN 978-1-59707-725-5)
19. The Jewel Smurfer (August 18, 2015, ISBN 978-1-62991-194-6)
20. Doctor Smurf (March 1, 2016, ISBN 978-1-62991-433-6)
21. The Wild Smurf (September 6, 2016, ISBN 978-1-62991-575-3)
22. The Smurf Menace (January 17, 2017, ISBN 978-1-62991-623-1)
23. You Can't Smurf Progress (June 6, 2017, ISBN 978-1-62991-738-2)
24. The Smurf Reporter (September 25, 2018)
25. The Gambling Smurfs (2019)
26. Smurf Salad (October 8, 2019 ISBN 978-1545803356)
27. "The Smurfs And The Bratty Kid" (July 27, 2021)
28. "Smurf & Turf" (April 12, 2022)

Other special books:

1. "Christmas Smurfs" (October 1, 2013)
2. "Forever Smurfette" (November 18, 2014)
3. "Smurf Monsters" (September 29, 2015)
4. "The Village Behind the Wall" (March 21, 2017)
5. "The Smurfs Special Boxed Set" (April 4, 2017)

Papercutz published "The Smurf Submarine" in Geronimo Stilton & Smurfs for Free Comic Book Day on May 7, 2011.

Since 2021 Papercutz has continued to localize the Smurfs comics by creating a new series called “The Smurfs Tales”.

== In popular culture ==
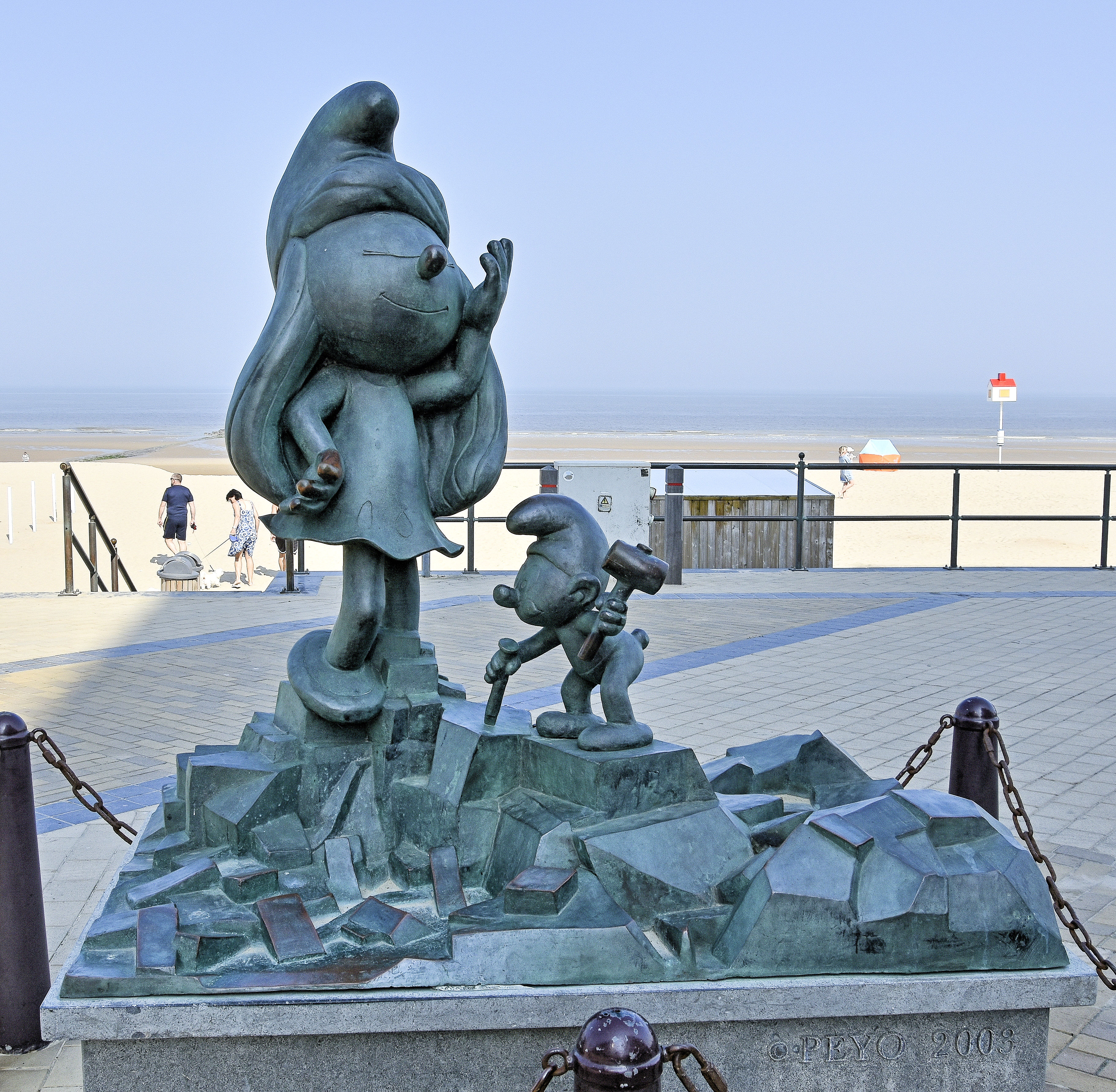
Smurfette statue in Middelkerke

In the Belgian Comic Strip Center in Brussels the permanent exhibition brings homage to the pioneers of Belgian comics, among them Peyo. In the room dedicated to his work various objects, comic book pages, sketches,... from "The Smurfs" comics can be seen.

The Smurfs are among the many Belgian comics characters to jokingly have a Brussels street named after them. The Rue des Sables/Zandstraat has a commemorative plaque with the name Rue Schtroumpfs/Smurfstraat placed under the actual street sign. Close to the Smurfs studios in Genval (in the province of Walloon Brabant), a bronze statue of the Smurfs is sited in a traffic circle. In 2003, a statue of a Smurf sculpting a larger statue of Smurfette was unveiled in Middelkerke, on the Belgian coast. It was sculpted by Monique Mol.

At the Marché aux Herbes/Grasmarkt in Brussels a five-metre-high (16 ft) statue of a Smurf on a toadstool can be seen. It was sculpted by Maryline Garbe and unveiled on June 25, 2012.

== See also ==
- List of The Smurfs characters
- Belgian comics
- Franco-Belgian comics
- Marcinelle school
- Belgian Comic Strip Center
- Brussels' Comic Book Route
