= The Smurfette =

Third album in the series The Smurfs

The Smurfette (La Schtroumpfette)
- Creator: Peyo
- Date: 16 March 1967
- Series: The Smurfs
- Page count: 64 pages
- Publisher: Dupuis

Chronology
- Preceded by: King Smurf (1965)
- Followed by: The Egg and the Smurfs (1968)

The Smurfette (French: La Schtroumpfette) is the third album of the original French-language Smurfs comic series. The story has also been made into an episode of the Smurfs animated cartoon show, where the only known significant difference is that Smurfette stays in the village for the rest of the show's run. Apart from the titular story, it contains another one called La Faim des Schtroumpfs ("The Hunger of the Smurfs").

== Plot ==
=== The Smurfette ===
Gargamel wants to take revenge against the Smurfs for his humiliating defeat at their hands. He decides that the most horrible plan to destroy them would be to send them a female Smurf, who shall seduce them and lead them to their doom. He thus fashions her out of clay and dips her in a potion, creating Smurfette.

Smurfette is sent to the Smurf village, and the others befriend her, despite that she later proves to be annoying, albeit good-meaning. She is very talkative, a bit bossy, overly friendly, and emotional. At first, Smurfette looks like a male Smurf with scraggly black hair, a large nose, and rather surly eyes, the only thing separating her from the rest being her white dress; not exactly the attractive temptress that Gargamel tried to create.

Some of the Smurfs become sick of her, so they decide to play a trick: they make her think she has become overweight (by rigging a scale, setting in a misshapen mirror, making her listen to some nasty talk...). Becoming depressed, she realizes that she is not pretty and Papa Smurf decides to help her: he operates plastic smurfery on her for days and nights, and Smurfette comes out with blonde hair, more delicate features, longer eyelashes, walking and acting much more gracefully.

All the Smurfs instantly fall in love with her; soon after, they all try to seduce her through different means. The competition and jealousy eventually bring chaos and violence among the Smurfs, who are ready for anything to please her, even painting the dam of the river pink.

The last straw is when Smurfette forces Poet Smurf to open the dam for her, just so she could see the water spurting. The dam gets stuck open and the village is flooded. Even after the dam is sealed back up, the village is in a disastrous state. When Papa Smurf discovers that Smurfette is indirectly responsible, he tells her that she has only brought trouble. Furious, Smurfette tells them all that she shall then go back to Gargamel. After hearing this, Papa Smurf orders her arrested and places her on trial.

The trial proves to be quite biased, most of the Smurfs supporting Smurfette's innocence. Jokey Smurf (who is Smurfette's attorney) reminds them that she has been able to seduce the Smurfs because of Papa Smurf, who made her attractive. Smurfette is eventually declared not guilty.

Smurfette cannot stand the Smurfs fighting each other for her anymore. As such, she leaves the village indefinitely, leaving a message saying that she will be back one day (which she eventually does).

Although they are saddened by the event, Papa Smurf cheers them up by telling that they should get revenge on Gargamel and give him a taste of his own medicine: they create a fat ugly human woman out of clay (as Gargamel did with Smurfette) and send her to his house, where she desperately asks him for shelter, speaking in Smurf talk. The story ends with Gargamel running away from her, grumbling that he shall take vengeance.

=== The Hunger of the Smurfs ===
Winter is near and the Smurfs are gathering food. But days after the winter comes, the food storage is destroyed in a fire. To survive, they are forced to leave the village and find a place where they can feed themselves. After long days journeying in the cold wilderness, they find a human castle where its lord is living alone after losing all his fortune. Trying to find remaining food, they stumble on a secret room of jewels. They share their discovery with the lord, who can then buy food for them. The Smurfs are then able to go back to the village.

== In other media ==
"The Smurfette" was adapted for the 1980s Hanna-Barbera cartoon series. The Smurfs, in the 1981 season one episode, "The Smurfette". In the episode, Smurfette is Gargamel's spy and saboteur who intentionally tries to disrupt life in the village. She was magically created from blue clay, "sugar and spice but nothing nice, crocodile tears, half a pack of lies, a chatter of a magpie, and the hardest stone for her heart". In the adaptation, the plastic smurfery takes place after the dam incident and the subsequent trial. With the trial, all the Smurfs are depicted as angrily well aware of Smurfette's treachery, and change their minds only when she confesses that she is a pawn of Gargamel.

Some time after Smurfette gets her new look, Gargamel contacts her, and after noting that she has changed, he tells her that he can help her repay the Smurfs with a surprise party by the big oak tree. Of course, it turns out to be a trap. Smurfette arrives late and after discovering that she had been tricked, she disguises herself as a male Smurf, rescues the other Smurfs, and defeats Gargamel. The episode ends with Gargamel running away from the homely human woman the Smurfs created while Smurfette, with her loyalty now clearly established, is fully welcomed into the Smurf community.

== Titles in languages other than English and French ==
- Czech: Šmoulinka
- Danish: Smølfine
- Dutch/ Flemish: De Smurfin
- Finnish: Smurffiina
- German: Die Schlumpfine
- Italian: La Puffetta
- Macedonian: Штрумфета
- Polish: Smerfetka
- Slovenian: Smrketa
- Spanish: La Pitufina
- Turkish: Şirine
- Croatian: Štrumpfeta

== See also ==
- Smurfette principle
