= List of The Smurfs characters =

- The Smurfs characters
- Different original characters, including Smurfette and Papa Smurf
- First appearance: Original comic strip
- Created by: Peyo

This is a list of The Smurfs characters appearing in the original comics, the 1980s cartoon and the 2011 movie (as well as its sequels), and the 2021 reboot.

The Smurfs were also sold as collectible toys, and many of these characters were ideal from manufacturing and marketing points of view in that they had the same basic body plan but could be differentiated by one or two distinguishing accessories.

== Number of Smurfs ==
According to Spirou magazine N° 1954 from 1964, there are 100 Smurfs in total; this does not take into account later additions from the Smurfs comic books and films.

Although the Smurfs were fairly undifferentiated in the beginning, over time, where the story required it, very specific Smurfs emerged. For example, the character Smurfette was introduced in the 1967 album The Smurfette and disappeared "definitely" again at the end of that story. Only after she was re-introduced in the 1981 TV series, Smurfette became a regular character and the main protagonist of the series.

== Smurfs ==
Name	Original French name	Appears in	Voiced by
1. Smurfette	La Schtroumpfette	Comics + 1981 Cartoon + Movies + 2021 Cartoon	Lucille Bliss (1981 series); Katy Perry (Movie 1 & Movie 2); Demi Lovato (Smurfs: The Lost Village); Bérangère McNeese (2021 series); Rihanna (Smurfs)
1. Smurfette	Smurfette is the main protagonist of all movies with the exception of Movie 1 and a female Smurf who was created by Gargamel. She originally had black hair with an appearance disliked by others, but when Papa Smurf used magic to turn her from an evil creation to a real Smurf, her hair became blonde with a beautiful appearance. Before the Smurflings created Sassette, Smurfette was the only female Smurf in the Smurf village. She loves flowers, as in the episodes she can be seen watering them. Most of the time Smurfette is portrayed as an object of love, since her beauty attracts many other Smurfs. She is usually hopeless in times of danger and sometimes thinks she knows it all, yet she is kind, caring, sweet, and loving as well. In an interview, Lucille Bliss revealed that "Squeaky" was her favorite episode. In the 1981 series, she loves perfumes, dresses, and her flowers. This was dropped in the 2021 series, as she practices martial arts instead.		
2. Papa Smurf	Le Grand Schtroumpf	Comics + 1981 Cartoon + Movies + 2021 Cartoon	Richard Muller (1960s TV Series); Don Messick (1981 series); Jonathan Winters (Movie 1 and 2); Jack Angel (short films); Mandy Patinkin (Smurfs: The Lost Village); Davis Freeman (2021 series); John Goodman (Smurfs)
2. Papa Smurf	Papa Smurf is the leader and elder of the Smurfs and can be easily distinguished by his red trousers and cap, bushy white moustache and beard (though when he was younger, his moustache and beard were brown). He is a wizard and he works on spells and magic in his house. The Smurfs turn to Papa Smurf when things go wrong. Papa Smurf is skilled in making magical spells and potions. He is much older than the Smurfs except for Grandpa and Nanny, who are much older than Papa. Papa Smurf often serves the other Smurfs with his knowledge and wisdom and usually devises a plan for how to get out of trouble or to save the Smurf village from attacks by Gargamel.		
3. Brainy Smurf	Schtroumpf à Lunettes	Comics + 1961 Cartoon + 1981 Cartoon + Movies + 2021 Cartoon	Nelly Beghin (1960s TV Series); Star X. Phifer (The Smurfs and the Magic Flute); Cam Clarke(1989 series); Danny Goldman (1981 series); Fred Armisen (Movie 1 and 2, and CGI short films); Danny Pudi (Smurfs: The Lost Village); Youssef El Kaouakibi (2021 series); Xolo Maridueña (Smurfs)
3. Brainy Smurf	Brainy Smurf considers himself the most intelligent Smurf in the village and an expert on everything, although his actual knowledge is questionable at best; often, his attempts to help in a given situation lead to even more problems, and the Smurfs often blame him on everything. As such, he's the most disliked Smurf in the village. However, he isn't so bossy in The Smurfs 2. He can be distinguished from the others by the large glasses he wears. Since season 3 he has archived his self-perceived wit and wisdom in several volumes of books entitled "Quotations of Brainy Smurf", in which he tries to give it to the Smurfs, but with no success. When he annoys the other, the Smurfs respond by throwing him out of the village by Hefty (or with a hammer in the comics) or simply ignoring him. His vices aside, Brainy is a good, loyal Smurf who can be counted on when the need arises, and more than once – without thinking about it – ends up doing the right thing. His original name translates to "The Smurf with Glasses".		
4. Clumsy Smurf	Schtroumpf Maladroit	Comics + 1981 Cartoon + Movies + 2021 Cartoon	William Callaway (1981 series); Anton Yelchin (Movie 1 and 2, CGI short films); Jack McBrayer (Smurfs: The Lost Village); Tess Bryant (2021 series); Hugo Miller (Smurfs)
4. Clumsy Smurf	Clumsy Smurf is an awkward, somewhat dimwitted yet amiable Smurf. In some dangerous situations he is also revealed to be quite brave too. Despite his clumsiness, he finds himself always wanting to help others and usually looks on the bright side of things. He also ends up surprising himself and others when facing consequences. He is distinguished in the cartoon series by his baggy clothing (hat hanging over his eyebrows) which adds to his clumsy appearance (his clothing is normal in the comics). In the 1981 series, Clumsy speaks in a variety of Southern American English and his best friend is Brainy. This is not present in the 2021 series. In Movie 1, he is the main protagonist and goes through a character arc where he tries to become less clumsy. In the live-action films by Sony Pictures, Clumsy is given floppy ears to make him stand out among the other smurfs.		
5. Hefty Smurf	Schtroumpf Costaud	Comics + 1981 Cartoon + Movies + 2021 Cartoon	John Rust (The Smurfs and the Magic Flute); Frank Welker (1981 series); Gary Basaraba (Movie 1 and 2); Joe Manganiello (Smurfs: The Lost Village); Vincent Broes (2021 series); Alex Winter (Smurfs)
5. Hefty Smurf	Hefty Smurf has incredible strength and often is seen doing a lot of the heavy work in the village. He also has a tattoo on his right arm (or sometimes both of his arms) of a red heart with an arrow through it. His favorite activity is lifting weights and doing other forms of exercise, and is usually the one to kick Brainy out of the village whenever he is boasting. Hefty takes pride in being tough, sometimes doing it just for attention. Papa appoints Hefty as the leader of the Smurfs in season 3: Handy's Kite. In several episodes, Papa selects Hefty and Handy as leaders of separate teams in dangerous missions (season 1: Smurfette's Dancing Shoes; season 4: Hopping Cough Smurfs). In the video game "Mission Vileaf", he is the main protagonist.		
6. Grouchy Smurf	Schtroumpf Grognon	Comics + 1961 Cartoon + 1981 Cartoon + Movies + 2021 Cartoon	Jeannine Cherel (1960s TV Series); Michael Bell (1981 series); John Rust (The Smurfs and the Magic Flute); George Lopez (Movie 1 and 2, CGI short films); Jake Johnson (Smurfs: The Lost Village); Bumper Robinson (The Smurfs 2 video game); Joshua Rubin (2021 series); Chris Miller (Smurfs)
6. Grouchy Smurf	Grouchy Smurf is the misanthropic grouch of the Smurf village. His catchphrase is "I hate (something somebody else mentions)" yet it is shown during the show that he is a good observer and notices kindness in others even if he is not playing active role in an event. Even though Grouchy Smurf portrays a role of a moaner within the group, he mostly wishes others to be happy and successful in order to get out of a problematic situation. Grouchy usually has a scowl on his face. In the comics version he was originally a normal Smurf, changed only when bitten by a Bzz fly in the comic story "The Black Smurfs" (adapted into English as "The Purple Smurfs"). This is the backstory in the 2021 series. In the 1981 series, he seems to have always have been a grouch. Despite his grouchiness, he has a soft spot for Smurfette, Baby Smurf and the Smurflings. In Movie 1, his grouchiness is implied to be from insecurity. In Movie 2, he tries to become Positive Smurf, but bad things keep happening to him.		
7. Handy Smurf	Schtroumpf Bricoleur	Comics + 1981 Cartoon + Movies + 2021 Cartoon	Michael Bell (1981 series); Jeff Foxworthy (Movie 1 and 2); Bret Marnell (Smurfs: The Lost Village); Joshua Rubin (2021 series)
7. Handy Smurf	Handy Smurf (depicted as wearing overalls, a visor attached to the front of his cap, and with a pencil above his ear) is the handyman of the Smurfs. He helps fix things in the village and is known for his amazing technological inventions. He is the inventor of Clockwork Smurf and Clockwork Smurfette. Also known as the stress reliever in the village. He and Hefty are shown to be good friends, despite some heated arguments. In the 1981 series, his overalls are white, but in the comics, the movies, and the 2021 series, his overalls are dark blue. In the video game "The Prisoner of the Green Stone", he is the main protagonist.		
8. Jokey Smurf	Schtroumpf Farceur	Comics + 1961 Cartoon+ 1981 Cartoon + Movies + 2021 Cartoon	Nelly Beghin (1960s TV Series); June Foray and Ronnie Schell (1981 series); Paul Reubens (Movie 1 and 2); Gabriel Iglesias (Smurfs: The Lost Village); Kaycie Chase (2021 series)
8. Jokey Smurf	Jokey is the village prankster. In both cartoon shows, Jokey almost always used the same form of "joke"; yellow- and red-wrapped present boxes that he offers to his victims, saying that it is a "surprise". When opened, the "present" box explodes with a sizable quantity of black smoke which blackens the receiver's face (or entire body depending on the explosion's size). Gargamel is naturally a favorite target, and Brainy is as well. Sometimes Jokey is victim of his own pranks as well. In "Jokey's Joke Book" it was revealed that he has a book called Big Book of Laughs, though this book was destroyed.		
9. Greedy Smurf	Schtroumpf Gourmand	Comics + 1981 Cartoon + Movies 1 and 2 + 2021 Cartoon	Hamilton Camp (1981 series); Kenan Thompson (Movie 1 and 2); Ilse La Monaca (2021 series)
9. Greedy Smurf	Greedy is an exceptionally gluttonous Smurf. He has an exceptional interest in eating cakes and other pastry. Greedy usually cannot seem to help himself and he is often chased by Chef Smurf for stealing snacks and food. In the 1981 series, this character was combined with that of Baker Smurf, where he enjoys baking and cooking, but eventually ends up eating his own creations, hence the name. This was dropped in the 2021 series and instead has purple stains around his mouth. He wears a chef's toque and apron in the comics. In one episode of the 1981 series, he was angry when the Smurfs did not respected his cooking, so he leaves the village, but he gets kidnapped by the gnomes and was forced to work for their king. Luckily, the Smurfs were able to save him and they return to the village. In the 1981 series, instead of an apron he wears a napkin around his neck, and he also makes sweets for his fellow Smurfs when they feel sad.		
10. Chef Smurf	Schtroumpf Cuisinier	Comics + Movie 1 + 2021 Cartoon	Wolfgang Puck (Movie); Vincent Broes (2021 series)
10. Chef Smurf	Chef Smurf is the Smurf village's chef. He knows dozens of recipes and cooks many dishes. He always wears his toque blanche (white chef's hat). In Volume 11, a Smurf is called Schtroumpf Gourmand, who looks just like Schtroumpf cuisinier (wearing a toque blanche, neckerchief and apron). In Volume 23, Schtroumpf Gourmand is shown wearing the normal Smurf outfit (like he has in all other volumes) and Schtroumpf Cuisinier again wearing the chef outfit, so Volume 12 may have just been a mistake.		
11. Vanity Smurf	Schtroumpf Coquet	Comics + 1981 Cartoon + Movies + 2021 Cartoon	Alan Oppenheimer (1981 series); John Oliver (Movie 1 and 2); Tituss Burgess (Smurfs: The Lost Village); Daniel Sieteiglesias (2021 series); Maya Erskine (Smurfs)
11. Vanity Smurf	Vanity Smurf has a flower in the right side of his hat. Vanity's flower changes color in: white (comics), pink (1981 TV series), bright yellow (live-action films) and creamy yellow (Smurfs: The Lost Village and the 2021 TV series). In The Smurfs: A Christmas Carol, he wears a poinsettia to suit the occasion, and in The Smurfs: The Legend of Smurfy Hollow, he wears a cornucopia for a hat. He holds a hand mirror, staring into his own reflection, which he kisses it. He thinks he is the best-looking of all of the Smurfs, although all the Smurfs are the same. On episode 393 of the podcast Comic Book Central, Alan Oppenheimer said he based Vanity's voice on Jack Benny. In Movie 2, Vanity becomes Commando Smurf, and in both the movies, he speaks with a British accent.		
12. Lazy Smurf	Schtroumpf Paresseux	Comics + 1961 Cartoon + 1981 Cartoon + Movie (brief cameo) + 2021 Cartoon	Jeannine Cherel (1960s TV Series); Michael Bell (1981 series); Sandra Asratian (2021 series)
12. Lazy Smurf	Lazy Smurf is the laziest of all the Smurfs. He spends almost all his time sleeping, either: in his bed, a hammock, on the grass, under a tree, or anywhere at any time day or night, even in the village's well.		
13. Harmony Smurf	Schtroumpf Musicien	Comics + 1981 Cartoon + 2021 Cartoon	Hamilton Camp (1981 series); Davis Freeman (2021 series)
13. Harmony Smurf	Harmony Smurf is a musician who especially loves to play the trumpet, although his musical ability shows a total lack of harmony (somewhat like the singing of a certain fictional Armorican bard, or Johan's blonde-haired, diminutive sidekick). Harmony is usually asked to stop playing his trumpet as soon as he gets started. Some English editions name him as Rocker Smurf. In the 2021 series, he's seen wearing sunglasses.		
14. Farmer Smurf	Schtroumpf Paysan	Comics + 1981 Cartoon + 2021 Cartoon + Movies	Alan Young (1981 series); Joel McCrary (Movie 1 and 2); Jeff Dunham (Smurfs: The Lost Village); Davis Freeman (2021 series)
14. Farmer Smurf	Farmer Smurf is the farmer of the Smurf village. He helps organize crops and harvests food for the winter. He gets his own genie in a bottle named Gourdy, though he generally prefers working for things rather than wishing for them. In the 1981 series, and the early comics, he dresses in ordinary Smurf clothes. In later comics and animation media, he wears a straw hat and green overalls, though at one point in the comics, he had worn Smurf pants held by two suspenders with clogs.		
15. Poet Smurf	Schtroumpf Poète	Comics + 1981 Cartoon + 2021 Cartoon	Frank Welker (1981 series); Lawrence Sheldon (2021 series)
15. Poet Smurf	Poet Smurf is the poet of the village. He is very sensitive and artistic, and he spends most of his time wandering in nature to improvise poems about it, and sometimes has trouble finding verses that rhyme. He usually manages to do it through some accident. Despite being on the main characters of the 1981 cartoon, Poet is the second least appearing of all the Smurfs (with the Smurf that has least appearances is Tailor), and he never appeared in any of the season 9 episodes.		
16. Painter Smurf	Schtroumpf Peintre	Comics + 1961 Cartoon + 1981 Cartoon + Movie (cameo) + 2021 Cartoon	Jeannine Cherel (1960s TV Series); William Callaway (1981 series); Charlie Cattrall (2021 series)
16. Painter Smurf	Painter Smurf is the village's artist and is active in most visual arts. He wears a red jacket with a black tie, and is often seen making a painting. In the 1981 series, he speaks with a French accent and refers to his paintings as "masterpizzes," and his favorite subject of his paintings is Smurfette. In "The Hundredth Smurf", he appears like Handy, but without the pencil. In the German dub of the episode, both Painter and Handy were confusedly referred to as Handy. While he speaks with a French accent, Painter speaks with an Italian accent in the French dub of the 1981 series and the 2021 series. In the live-action Sony Pictures movies, Painter wears a black beret instead of a regular smurf hat. In the comics, the 1981 series, and the 2021 series, he wears a white Phrygian cap but wears a black beret in the movies.		
17. Scaredy Smurf	Schtroumpf Peureux	Comics + 1981 Cartoon + 2021 Cartoon	Alan Young (1981 series); Tess Bryant (2021 series)
17. Scaredy Smurf	Scaredy Smurf easily gets scared by anything whether it is a small insect or the noise of a storm. He is often teased by the other Smurfs because of this.		
18. Sloppy Smurf	Schtroumpf Sale	Comics + 1981 Cartoon + 2021 Cartoon	Marshall Efron (1981 series); Mark Irons (2021 series)
18. Sloppy Smurf	Sloppy Smurf is a filthy Smurf with a passion for dirt, garbage, and rotten fruit. His face is perpetually grimy, his hat is grubby and disheveled, and one of his loose stockings is perpetually torn, revealing his toes. Sloppy owns a pet fly named Fly, whom he sometimes walks on a leash and has taught to do tricks like a dog.		
19. Tracker Smurf	Schtroumpf qui a du Flair	1981 Cartoon	Henry Polic II
19. Tracker Smurf	Tracker Smurf is a Smurf who is exclusive to the 1981 cartoon. He wears a small red feather in his cap and sometimes carries a walking stick. He is an excellent outdoorsman and tracker. He also possesses an excellent sense of smell capable of locating truffles growing underground. He speaks with a British accent. In "A Mere Truffle", he receives the Brainy treatment (thrown away or kicked away and lands on his head).		
20. Baby Smurf	Bébé Schtroumpf	Comics + 1981 Cartoon + 2021 Cartoon	Julie McWhirter (1981 series); Bérangère McNeese (2021 series)
20. Baby Smurf	Baby Smurf was brought by a Stork on the night of the blue moon. He's loved by Grouchy since he has a soft spot for him. Baby is also loved by Smurfette, Papa, Grandpa, Nanny, the Smurflings and every Smurf in the village. He has display magic powers when nobody was watching and Baby is the only one who can open Puppy's locket when nobody else can. Baby is much more prone to temper tantrums and often starts crying. Baby is usually holden by the adult Smurfs, but since season 6, Baby is now holden by the Smurflings as well, usually by Sassette. In the comics, he alternates his suit between white and pink. This is not seen in both of the 1981 and 2021 series, as his suit was white.		
21. Natural Smurfling (formerly known as Natural Smurf)	Schtroumpf Nature	Comics + 1981 Cartoon	Joey Camen (adult) and Charlie Adler (Smurfling)
21. Natural Smurfling (formerly known as Natural Smurf)	Originally a full grown Smurf known as Natural Smurf, he had his age reversed in an accident with Father Time's Reverse Clock becoming a Smurfling in season 5. He is very friendly and kind-hearted towards his fellow Smurfs and fellow Smurflings and the animals in the forest. He wears light brown overalls, a straw hat, and is always barefoot (similar to some depictions of hillbillies). Nat can talk to animals and loves all things related to nature and the environment.		
22. Snappy Smurfling	Schtroumpf Colérique	Comics + 1981 Cartoon	Pat Musick
22. Snappy Smurfling	Snappy Smurf had his age reversed in an accident and became Snappy Smurfling in an accident with Father Time's Reverse Clock. Snappy is very bratty, rude, and reckless, and loves getting his own way, yet he has a caring side too. This was shown in the episode "Fire-Fighting Smurfs". He admires Hefty for his strength, and he often tries to imitate him. Snappy wears a yellow T-shirt with a storm cloud on it in the cartoon and the comics, which is indicative of his impulsive disposition. He used to have a teddy bear named Huggy in which he gives it to Baby. In an interview, Pat Musick said that her favorite episode is "Little Big Smurf".		
23. Slouchy Smurfling	Schtroumpf Mollasson	Comics + 1981 Cartoon	Noelle North
23. Slouchy Smurfling	Slouchy Smurf had his age reversed in an accident with Father Time's Reverse Clock and became Slouchy Smurfling. Slouchy is not a very enthusiastic Smurf, as he is very calm, laidback, and quiet, and he often takes a relaxed pose with eyes half-closed. Slouchy has a red tee-shirt and loose-fitting white cap.		
24. Sassette Smurfling	Sassette	Comics + 1981 Cartoon	Julie McWhirter
24. Sassette Smurfling	Sassette was created by the Smurflings as a sister for Smurfette. Like Smurfette, Sassette was evil at first as she was created using Gargamel's original spell, but with a Smurf-sized lump of magical blue clay. Papa Smurf used the same spell on her that he had used on Smurfette to make her a real Smurf (although in the comics, she was never evil after being created). Sassette is a young female Smurfling with red hair, pigtails and pink overalls. She is also a tomboy and is playful, energetic, and very happy. She is an adventurer. She likes to call Papa Smurf "Pappy" and Grandpa Smurf "Grandpy". She has somewhat of a warm place in her heart for Gargamel since she was made by his spell, calling him "Pappy Gargamel". Sassette has a rag doll named Smurfy Lou. She likes playing usual boy games. She is the most emotional of all the Smurflings. She has a pet frog which she does not have in the comics. Sassette likes animals like Nat, although she can't talk to them, and she has many catchphrases based on animals in many episodes she appeared in. She was the only Smurfling in the village to have the most faith on Grandpa Smurf. Sassette also comes up with new plans to make the lives of her fellow adult Smurfs easier. She often follows the adult Smurfs on dangerous missions. Sassette is usually the Smurfling to hold Baby when around her after the events of "Bringing Up Bigfeet", she can also be seen with Baby as well, as they act like brother and sister. Clumsy also acts as a brother for Sassette as well. She is also best friends with Denisa as well. Sassette has the most high pitched voice out of all the Smurfs. She has freckles in the comics which she does not have in the 1981 series. She spends most of her time with Nat, Snappy and Slouchy and they become best friends with each other. Sassette is close with Smurfette as the two act like sisters and Smurfette likes to teach Sassette about topics Sassette is confused on. However, Smurfette and Sassette have gotten bumps in their relationship (season 5: Smurfette's Rose; season 7: To Coin a Smurf). Despite the fights, Smurfette apologizes for any mistakes she has made to Sassette. In both the comics and the 1981 series, she appears more than Nat, Snappy and Slouchy.		
25. Grandpa Smurf	Vieux-Vieux Schtroumpf	Comics + 1981 Cartoon	Jonathan Winters
25. Grandpa Smurf	Grandpa Smurf (who does not appear in the original comics, except in the ones made for the magazine) is the oldest of all the Smurfs. He returned to the Smurf village after a five hundred-year absence. Grandpa walks slightly bent over with a cane, has a long, tapering moustache and beard, and wears yellow overalls, a yellow hat, and glasses. He has a magic balloon, which he uses it to travel with the Smurflings. His original name translates to "Old old Smurf".		
26. Alchemist Smurf	Apprenti Schtroumpf	Comics	
26. Alchemist Smurf	A Smurf with an unusual interest in doing his own chemical and magical experiments making him the residential alchemist.		
27. Timid Smurf	Schtroumpf Timide	Comics + 1981 Cartoon + 2021 Cartoon	Frank Welker (1981 series); Madeleine Fletcher (2021 series)
27. Timid Smurf	Timid is a very shy Smurf. He once decided to adopt a dragon he called Grumpf, after he felt insecure because he did not have many friends, but in the movie The Smurfs and the Magic Flute, he is an actor when Papa presents the Smurfs to Johan and Peewit. In the 2021 show, however, he's never an actor and is always shy.		
28. Architect Smurf		1981 Cartoon	Brenda Vaccaro
28. Architect Smurf	Architect Smurf is the Smurfs' residential architect. He designs all the mushroom houses of the Smurf village, including the Smurflings' playhouse. In the cartoon, Architect burned out on designing only mushroom houses and built a skyscraper to replace the village. After a fire burns the skyscraper down, Architect fells guilty for what has he done, and he and Smurfs move back into the village.		
29. Baker Smurf	Schtroumpf Boulanger	Comics + Movies	B.J. Novak (The Smurfs, The Smurfs 2); Gordon Ramsay (Smurfs: The Lost Village); Jonny Manganello (Smurfs)
29. Baker Smurf	Baker Smurf is the local baker of the village. He directs a bakery shop and provides fresh bread for the Smurfs. In the 1981 series, Baker and Greedy are combined into the same character, which was dropped in the 2021 series.		
30. Clockwork Smurf (not an actual Smurf)	Schtroumpf Mécanique	Comics + 1981 Cartoon	Frank Welker
30. Clockwork Smurf (not an actual Smurf)	Clockwork Smurf is a wooden robot who was built by Handy Smurf. Despite the European Middle Age technology level at which the Smurfs are, he is capable of feelings and morality. Clockwork Smurf's favorite trick is eating smilax leaves, turning them into hot smilax soup and giving them to his fellow Smurfs. Despite being built by Handy, he left the village to live with King Gerard. In the comic, he is slightly bigger than the Smurfs, and he stays in the village due to King Gerard not appearing in the comics.		
31. Clockwork Smurfette (not an actual Smurf)	La Schtroumpfette Mécanique	1981 Cartoon	
31. Clockwork Smurfette (not an actual Smurf)	Like Clockwork Smurf, Clockwork Smurfette is a wooden robot who was built by Handy Smurf. She was made to be the female companion of Clockwork Smurf. Like her male counterpart, Clockwork Smurfette is capable of feelings and morality.		
32. Dabbler Smurf	Schtroumpf touche-à-tout	1981 Cartoon	Frank Welker
32. Dabbler Smurf	Dabbler Smurf is the most introverted and sentimental Smurf. He is constantly tormented by an inherent sadness, which stems from the inability of his friends and family to understand him. Dabbler's life is a never-ending quest for love and to be understood.		
33. Doctor Smurf	Docteur Schtroumpf	Comics + 1981 Cartoon + 2021 Cartoon	Frank Welker (1981 cartoon; as Dabbler)
33. Doctor Smurf	Doctor Smurf is the Smurfs' residential doctor. He has a very superficial knowledge of medicine and health, using scattered sources of medical books to give prescriptions to his patients. Nevertheless, he takes great pride in his self-established job which is lackluster at best and harmful at worst. In the 1981 series, Dabbler becomes Doctor after Papa visited Homnibus.		
34. Dopey Smurf	Schtroumpf Bêta	Comics + 2021 Cartoon	Mark Irons
34. Dopey Smurf	Dopey Smurf is portrayed as the least intelligent among the Smurfs. Other Smurfs often request him to get some object for them, and then he returns with a different one, having misunderstood. This is a running gag in the comics. In the 2021 series, he is named Dimwitty, and he works as a firefighter with Clumsy.		
35. Enamored Smurf	Schtroumpf Amoureux	Comics	
35. Enamored Smurf	Enamored Smurf has been in love with Smurfette ever since her arrival. He dreams about her, carves her name in trees, and pulls the petals off daisies, reciting "She loves me, she loves me not ..." When she loves him not, he cries all night.		
36. Finance Smurf	Schtroumpf Financier	Comics	
36. Finance Smurf	Finance Smurf is notable in Smurf comics for introducing currency to his peers, after being fascinated by its use in the human world. It was abandoned after a while since using currency created poverty and corruption among them.		
37. Flying Smurf	Schtroumpf Volant	Comics + 1961 Cartoon + Movies	Jeannine Cherel (1960s TV Series)
37. Flying Smurf	Flying Smurf has a sole passion in life....flying. He has tried several ways to fly in the air: sticking feathers on his arms, using a hot-air balloon, even eating a yeast mixture. His attempts were only short-lived and he gave up for a while....until he sought assistance from Handy Smurf who built him a big wooden mechanical airplane.		
38. King Smurf	Le Schtroumpfissime	Comics + 1981 Cartoon	Danny Goldman
38. King Smurf	King Smurf is a Smurf with a passion for power and being a leader. His story was first published in 1964 and a TV cartoon episode was made called King Smurf in which Brainy Smurf is the one who becomes king. In the comic, he is an anonymous Smurf. When Papa Smurf leaves the village on a long journey, the Smurfs hold an election to select his temporary replacement. King Smurf beats Brainy 99 to 1 (the dissenting vote was from another anonymous smurf who was told by King Smurf to vote for Brainy). However, his rule turns into a tyrannical one and conflict results, which only ends with Papa Smurf's return.		
39. Miner Smurf	Schtroumpf Mineur	Comics + 1981 Cartoon	Alan Young
39. Miner Smurf	Miner Smurf is the local miner of the village. He runs a mine in the forest from where most fossil material used among the Smurfs comes from. He wears an old dark blue jacket, red neckerchief, trousers and a metal hard hat. In the cartoon, he looks like a normal Smurf, except he wears green-yellow gloves and has a small wax candle on the top of his dirty hat for illumination. He speaks with an Irish accent (and he also claimed to be from Ireland).		
40. Nanny Smurf	Mémé Schtroumpf	Comics + 1981 Cartoon	Susan Blu
40. Nanny Smurf	An old flame of Grandpa Smurf's, Nanny enters the cartoon series after being trapped inside a cursed castle for centuries. It is unclear if she was somehow created via sorcery like Smurfette and Sassette. She is introduced in Season 8 of the series and she owns a pet named Smoogle. She affectionately calls Grandpa Smurf "Grampers".		
41. Nosey Smurf	Schtroumpf Fouineur	Comics + 1981 Cartoon + Smurfs: The Lost Village + 2021 Cartoon	Frank Nelson; Kelly Asbury (Smurfs: The Lost Village)
41. Nosey Smurf	Nosey Smurf is always curious, always wanting to know everything. In fact, he is so curious he pokes around in the other Smurfs' business, causing problems for everyone and nearly endangering his fellow Smurfs by snooping into the plans of twin sister witches looking for the mythical Land of Yore. In the 2021 series, he is named Curious.		
42. Editor Smurf	Schtroumpf Editeur	1981 Cartoon	Don Messick
42. Editor Smurf	The Smurfs' residential editor-in-chief. Editor Smurf brings out the newspapers.		
43. Fisher Smurf	Schtroumpf Pêcheur	Comics	
43. Fisher Smurf	Fisher Smurf is occasionally seen in the comics and is the Smurfs' residential fisherman, although he doesn't have luck with catching any fish.		
44. Miller Smurf	Schtroumpf Meunier	Comics	
44. Miller Smurf	Miller Smurf is a Smurf who wears a blue and white striped Smurf hat and the clothes of a Dutch mill operator. He is the Smurf who harvests wheat and brings it to Baker Smurf.		
45. Hundredth Smurf	Centième Schtroumpf	Comics + 1981 Cartoon	Alan Oppenheimer
45. Hundredth Smurf	Hundreth Smurf used to be Vanity Smurf's reflection, but came to life after a lightning bolt struck Vanity Smurf's mirror. He originally spoke in a reverse Smurf language and did everything in reverse. When he tried to get back into the mirror after being kicked out of Vanity's house when he and Vanity got into an argument and it was struck by another lightning bolt at the same time, he could speak and do everything normally and has done so ever since.		
46. Reporter Smurf	Schtroumpf Reporter	Comics + 1981 Cartoon + 2021 Cartoon	Ronnie Schell (1981 series); Mark Irons (2021 series)
46. Reporter Smurf	Reporter Smurf is the reporter of the village. He likes to write sensational articles for his own newspaper and has a tendency to look for controversial news which eventually causes him to have problems.		
47. Sculptor Smurf	Schtroumpf Sculpteur	Comics + 2021 Cartoon	Ilsa La Monaca
47. Sculptor Smurf	Sculptor Smurf is, as his name tells, the sculptor in the village, and spends most of his time making sculptures of other Smurfs. He is identified by his gray work smock, although in the early comics and the 2021 TV series, nothing visually sets Sculptor apart from the other Smurfs besides his use of a hammer and carving.		
48. Sickly Smurf	Schtroumpf Frileux	Comics + 1981 Cartoon	Don Messick
48. Sickly Smurf	Sickly Smurf (Sneezy in the comics) is a Smurf who is very cold-sensitive. Always shivering, he is always wrapped in a big scarf. Despite wearing several layers of thick, warm clothes, he still cannot get over his permanent flu, making him sneeze often. He only appears in Season 3 episodes 14 and 23.		
49. Stinky Smurf	Schtroumpf Puant	Comics	
49. Stinky Smurf	Stinky Smurf hated to wash, which gave him an awful and unbearable body scent, making him attract flies and repel his fellow Smurfs, especially Smurfette. Although he once managed to thwart Gargamel using his stench, he was forcefully given a bath.		
50. Sweepy Smurf	Schtroumpf Ramoneur	Comics + 1981 Cartoon	Don Messick
50. Sweepy Smurf	Sweepy Smurf is a chimney sweep with a British accent, almost sounding like Dick Van Dyke in Walt Disney's Mary Poppins. He carries a chimney sweep broom, wears a black brimmed hat, red scarf around his neck, and black pants/shoes. He tends to have a dirt cloud around him, causing everything (and everyone) around him to get dirty.		
51. Tailor Smurf	Schtroumpf Tailleur	Comics + 1981 Cartoon + Movie (cameo in credits) + 2021 Cartoon	Kip King (1981 series); Charlie Cattrall (2021 series)
51. Tailor Smurf	Tailor Smurf is the Smurfs' residential tailor who makes all the clothes in the village. He is often seen with two needles in his cap and a tape measure around his neck. Tailor speaks with an accent of immigrants to America who worked as tailors, but in the 2021 series, he speaks with a British accent. He also made a rag doll named Smurfy Lou for Sassette. Despite being one of the main characters of the 1981 cartoon, Tailor is the least appearing of all the Smurfs, and he did not appeared in any of the season 9 episodes.		
52. Weakling Smurf	Schtroumpf Chétif	Comics + 1981 Cartoon + 2021 Cartoon	Alan Young (1981 series); Kaycie Chase (2021 series)
52. Weakling Smurf	Weakling Smurf is a puny Smurf who tries to be athletic, but fails at all kinds of sports. When Hefty Smurf organizes the Olympic Smurfs (published in 1980), Weakling tries but fails to make an impact while in the training stage and decides to give up. Papa Smurf gives him a special potion that he says will enable him to compete. Weakling proceeds to win every contest he enters but, on being awarded his medal, confesses that he cheated. Papa Smurf then reveals that his potion was nothing more than a form of harmless jam that he gave to Weakling in order to boost his morale, meaning that Weakling did win the Games on his own merit. In the 2021 series, he is named Wimpy.		
53. Wild Smurf	Schtroumpf Sauvage	Comics + 1981 Cartoon + 2021 Cartoon	Frank Welker (1981 series); Luke Calzonetti (2021 series)
53. Wild Smurf	Wild Smurf only wears clothing made of leaves. He is a feral Smurf and is not understood by the other Smurfs. Having been lost as a baby and brought up by a family of squirrels, he can communicate with animals and ask for their assistance, and has a squirrel friend named Chitter. He appears to be the same age as most of the other Smurfs. He's admired by the Smurflings, particularly by Nat.		
54. Weepy Smurf	Schtroumpf Pleureur	Comics + 1981 Cartoon	Mona Marshall (season 6); Frank Welker (season 7)
54. Weepy Smurf	Weepy Smurf is a crybaby Smurf. Weepy cries at the drop of a hat. He holds an orange handkerchief.		
55. Tuffy Smurf	Schtroumpf Batailleur	1981 Cartoon	Pat Fraley
55. Tuffy Smurf	Tuffy Smurf acts tougher than he is and often challenges others to fisticuffs and gets knocked out each time. He is notable for wearing a black belt with a buckle and actually fighting Azrael (although he always comes out worse for wear). Appears in season 4: The Smurfbox Derby and season 4: Gargamel's Giant.		
56. Wooly Smurf	Schtroumpf Laineux	1981 Cartoon	Dick Gautier
56. Wooly Smurf	Wooly Smurf is the Smurfs' residential sheep shearer who shears sheep. He wears a wool hat and shears on a belt. Wooly talks with a Texan accent. He only appears in the episodes "Wild and Wooly" and "Sleepless Smurfs".		
57. Nurse Smurf	Schtroumpf Infirmier	Comics	
57. Nurse Smurf	Nurse Smurf is the Smurfs' residential nurse. He is shown in Volume 12 wrapping another Smurf's finger.		
58. Lucky Smurf	Schtroumpf Chançard	Comics	
58. Lucky Smurf	After watching the humans making bets, Lucky Smurf brings gambling to the village in Volume 23, Les Schtroumpfs Joueurs. His name is ironic since he is very unlucky at gambling.		
59. Timber Smurf	Schtroumpf Bûcheron	Comics + 1981 Cartoon	Bernard Erhard
59. Timber Smurf	Timber Smurf (Lumberjack in the comics) is the Smurfs' residential lumberjack. He wears a knit hat and a flannel shirt, and he's similar to Tin Woodman from The Wonderful Wizard of Oz children novel. In the 1981 Cartoon, He is a regular Smurf with an axe.		
60. Pretentious Smurf	Schtroumpf Prétentieux	Comics	
60. Pretentious Smurf	Pretentious Smurf thinks a little too much of himself.		
61. Pastrycook Smurf	Schtroumpf Pâtissier	Comics	
61. Pastrycook Smurf	Pastrycook Smurf is the Smurfs' residential pastry chef. He wears a white hat and apron and cooks pastries for the village.		
62. Cook Smurf	Schtroumpf Cuistot	Comics	
62. Cook Smurf	Like Chef Smurf, Cook Smurf is the Smurf's residential cook. He has a different, taller chef's hat than Pastrycook Smurf, an apron and a neckerchief.		
63. Submariner Smurf	Schtroumpf Sous-Marin	Comics	
63. Submariner Smurf	Submariner Smurf is a sailor who used a submarine that Handy Smurf made for him. After a run-in with a fish and Gargamel, it was converted to land use with wheels. When that did not work, it was turned into a pool at which point he became Mariner Smurf.		
64. Gutsy Smurf	Schtroumpf Téméraire	Movie 1 and 2	Alan Cumming; Chris Cox (The Smurfs 2 video game)
64. Gutsy Smurf	Gutsy Smurf is a brave, noble Smurf who appears in the Smurfs movies and CGI short films. He has a Scottish accent and wears a plaid, Scottish kilt with pants underneath. He has orange/brown sideburns that most Smurfs his age do not.		
65. Navigator Smurf	Schtroumpf Navigateur	Comics	
65. Navigator Smurf	Navigator Smurf is the Smurf's residential navigator who sails boats and sometimes wears a blue bicorne hat.		
66. Hunter Smurf	Schtroumpf Chasseur	Comics	
66. Hunter Smurf	Hunter Smurf is the Smurfs' residential hunter. He wears a feather in his hat and has a bow and arrows. Hunter Smurf is a very inept archer however, and he always manages to miss his targets.		
67. Marco Smurf	Marco Schtroumpfo	Comics + 1981 Cartoon	Rob Paulsen
67. Marco Smurf	Marco Smurf wears an old English hat and a medallion around his neck and goes out to sea to get the Smurfs' spices. The last time he went, it took him two years to get back home and the other Smurfs where forced to go on an expedition to find him. He is a spoof of the explorer Marco Polo, and he also speaks with a British accent.		
68. Flighty Smurf	Schtroumpf Indécis	Comics + 1981 Cartoon	Paul Winchell
68. Flighty Smurf	Flighty Smurf has problems making decisions, making him the second least intelligent Smurf, the other being Dopey.		
(should not be counted). Don Smurfo	Don Schtroumpfo	1981 Cartoon	William Callaway
(should not be counted). Don Smurfo	Don Smurfo is a fictional character in a Smurf book. He speaks with an Italian accent.		
69. Nobody Smurf	Schtroumpf sans Nom	1981 Cartoon	
69. Nobody Smurf	A Smurf who always seems to get overlooked. He is't to be confused with No Name Smurf.		
70. Pushover Smurf	Schtroumpf Bonasse	1981 Cartoon	Ronnie Schell
70. Pushover Smurf	Pushover Smurf can not say "no" to any task given to him. Appeared only in the cartoon story "The Smurf Who Couldn't Say No", which caused him to become a pushover "sometimes".		
71. Crazy Smurf	Schtroumpf Zinzin	Movie 1 and 2	John Kassir
71. Crazy Smurf	A new Smurf character for the 2011 movie. He is the craziest smurf.		
72. Narrator Smurf	Schtroumpf Narrateur	Movie 1 and 2	Tom Kane
72. Narrator Smurf	Another new Smurf character for the 2011 movie. He is the Smurfs' narrator who narrates what happens to each Smurf or person during the course of the movie, much to Grouchy's dismay.		
73. Passive-Aggressive Smurf	Schtroumpf Casseur d'Ambiance	Movie 2	Jimmy Kimmel
73. Passive-Aggressive Smurf	He was a Smurf that was referenced in the first movie. He appeared in the second movie where he tells Papa Smurf that Brainy is an excellent choice for a time-traveling companion and then adds "Good luck with that" (which only makes Brainy complain).		
74. Panicky Smurf		Movie 2	Adam Wylie
74. Panicky Smurf	The next new Smurf character for the second movie. He is a Smurf who always panics when he's afraid.		
75. Social Smurf	Schtroumpf Réseau	Movie 2	Mario Lopez
75. Social Smurf	A blogging Smurf that is exclusive to the second movie.		
76. Smooth Smurf		Movie 2	Shaquille O'Neal
76. Smooth Smurf	A smooth-talking Smurf that is exclusive to the second movie. He is a musician who is part of Narrator Smurf's band.		
77. Clueless Smurf	Schtroumpf Paumé	Movie 2	Shaun White
77. Clueless Smurf	A clueless Smurf that is exclusive to the second movie.		
78. Party Planner Smurf		Movie 2	Kevin Lee
78. Party Planner Smurf	A Smurf that is exclusive to the second movie. He provides the party service for the Smurfs.		
79. Vexy Smurf	Vexy	Movie 2	Christina Ricci
79. Vexy Smurf	Vexy was an original creation by Gargamel. Like her brother Hackus, Vexy was turned into a real Smurf by the spell that was originally used on Smurfette.		
80. Hackus Smurf		Movie 2	J. B. Smoove
80. Hackus Smurf	Hackus was an original creation by Gargamel who is not very bright. Like his sister Vexy, Hackus was turned into a real Smurf by the spell that was originally used on Smurfette.		
81. Complimentary Smurf		Movie 2	N/A
81. Complimentary Smurf	He is a new Smurf mentioned in the first movie. He was mentioned in the scene where the Smurfs talked about all their Smurfy family that they missed.		
82. Drummer Smurf	Schtroumpf Tambour	Comics + CGI short films	N/A
82. Drummer Smurf	He is a new Smurf shown in The Smurfs: The Legend of Smurfy Hollow. He is distinguished primarily by his drum set.		
83. Schemer Smurf		The Smurfs and the Magic Flute	N/A
83. Schemer Smurf	He rides on Feathers and tries to take back the magic flute from the villain in The Smurfs and the Magic Flute.		
84. Dreamy Smurf	Schtroumpf Réveur	1981 Cartoon + 2021 Cartoon	Don Messick (1981 series); Ilse La Monaca (2021 series)
84. Dreamy Smurf	A daydreamer who constantly fantasizes about visiting faraway lands, like other planets and meeting aliens (season 1: The Astrosmurf; season 2: It Came from Outer Smurf; season 5: Dreamy's Pen Pals). In "The Last Smurfberry" (season 3), he becomes the captain of the Smurfs' ship, the S.S. Smurf II, and fills the position for the rest of the 1981 show, and the Smurfs often referred to him as "Captain Dreamy". His adventures are split between different Smurfs (like Pilot Smurf and Traveler Smurf) in the comics. In the 2021 series, he is named Dreamer.		
85. Gullible Smurf		Smurfs: The Lost Village	Scott Menville
85. Gullible Smurf	A Smurf who falls for everything, especially Jokey's pranks.		
86. Paranoid Smurf		Smurfs: The Lost Village	N/A
86. Paranoid Smurf	A Smurf who stays inside his house with the shades closed. What exactly he is paranoid about is unknown.		
87. Policeman Smurf		Smurfs: The Lost Village	N/A
87. Policeman Smurf	Supposedly a police officer-type Smurf who mostly stands in the middle of the street directing traffic, despite the fact that there is no traffic in Smurf Village or even cars for that matter. Rather than wearing white, his outfit is a dark blue with a noticeable black brim on the front of his cap. He also possesses white gloves, a police baton, sunglasses and a red blow whistle.		
88. Magician Smurf		Smurfs: The Lost Village	N/A
88. Magician Smurf	A Smurf who performs magic tricks where he acts as the Smurf's residential magician.		
89. Mime Smurf		Smurfs: The Lost Village	N/A
89. Mime Smurf	A Smurf that wears mime make up, a black cap, and pants and a striped shirt. As his name implies he acts like a mime artist.		
90. Table-Eating Smurf		Smurfs: The Lost Village	N/A
90. Table-Eating Smurf	As his name implies, this Smurf likes to chomp down on the edge of tables. Even Papa Smurf seems confused by his behavior. By the end of the movie, two female Smurfs from the lost village join him in his bizarre habit.		
91. Karate Smurf		Smurfs: The Lost Village	Danik Thomas
91. Karate Smurf	A Smurf who knows karate and teaches it to the other Smurfs. Additionally, he wears a white gi, a black belt, and a red headband that fits around his Smurf cap.		
92. Winner Smurf		Smurfs: The Lost Village	N/A
92. Winner Smurf	A Smurf who seems to constantly win competitions that he takes part in. He is often in the company of Loser Smurf.		
93. Loser Smurf		Smurfs: The Lost Village	N/A
93. Loser Smurf	A Smurf who constantly loses. He is often in the company of Winner Smurf.		
94. Smurfwillow	Saule	Comics + Smurfs: The Lost Village + 2021 Cartoon Show	Julia Roberts (The Lost Village); Catherine Hersey (2021 series)
94. Smurfwillow	The motherly leader of the girls village, she is Papa Smurf's female counterpart and love interest.		
95. Smurfblossom	Bouton d'Or	Comics + Smurfs: The Lost Village + 2021 Cartoon Show	Ellie Kemper (The Lost Village); Sandra Asratian (2021 series)
95. Smurfblossom	A friendly, peppy, and energetic female Smurf. She tends to laugh a lot over the words "papa" and "boy", and it is said that her favorite song just repeats the word "hey". In the 2021 Cartoon show, her dress is now pink and her shoes are white and Brainy Smurf's love interest.		
96. Smurfstorm	Tempête	Comics + Smurfs: The Lost Village + 2021 Cartoon Show	Michelle Rodriguez (The Lost Village); Sandra Asratian (2021 series)
96. Smurfstorm	Also known as "Stormy", she is a tough, tomboyish girl Smurf who is initially quite suspicious when Smurfette and the boy Smurfs come in search of the lost village. In the 2021 Cartoon show, her dress is dark green and Clumsy Smurf's love interest.		
97. Smurflily	Fleur de Lys	Comics + Smurfs: The Lost Village + 2021 Cartoon Show	Ariel Winter (The Lost Village); Jackie Jones (2021 series)
97. Smurflily	A gentle and warm girl Smurf. She was the Smurf that Smurfette saw when she saw Smurf eyes through a leaf. In the 2021 Cartoon show, her dress is a yellow-orange color, and her shoes are lighter, and speaks with an Australian accent.		
98. Smurfbegonia	Bégonia	Smurfs: The Lost Village + Comics + 2021 Cartoon Show	Loreanne Asratian (2021 series)
98. Smurfbegonia	A ditzy and absent-minded female Smurf, she often looks at the bright side of someone and tends to miss the point in things. In the comics she has floppy bangs and a light purple lily flower, in the 2021 Cartoon show, she has a similar hair style to Smurfstorm's, she has a yellow dress and a pink lily flower, and she's similar to Dopey.		
99. Smurfmelody	Mélodie	Comics + Smurfs: The Lost Village	Meghan Trainor
99. Smurfmelody	A female Smurf who is musically inclined.		
100. Smurfjade	Jade	Smurfs: The Lost Village	Melissa Sturm
100. Smurfjade	A female Smurf, not much is known about her other than her name when she introduced herself.		
101. Smurfpetal	Pétale	Smurfs: The Lost Village	
101. Smurfpetal	A female Smurf.		
102. Smurfclover	Trèfle	Smurfs: The Lost Village	
102. Smurfclover	A female Smurf who has a crush on Clumsy Smurf.		
103. Smurfmeadow	Chanterelle	Smurfs: The Lost Village	
103. Smurfmeadow	A female Smurf.		
104. Smurfdaisy	Daisy	Smurfs: The Lost Village	
104. Smurfdaisy	A female Smurf.		
105. Smurfholly	Houx	Smurfs: The Lost Village	
105. Smurfholly	A female Smurf.		
106. Smurfhazel	Noisette	Smurfs: The Lost Village	
106. Smurfhazel	A female Smurf.		
107. Smurfhoney	Miel	Comics	
107. Smurfhoney	A female Smurf. She takes care of the bees.		
108. Smurfmouse	Taupe	Comics	
108. Smurfmouse	A female Smurf. She bumps into everything, because she refuses to acknowledge her nearsightedness.		
109. Smurfmint	Minthe	Comics	
109. Smurfmint	A female Smurf. She wants to help Smurfwillow in her job.		
110. Smurfmeteorite	Météorite	2021 cartoon show	
110. Smurfmeteorite	A female Smurf. Plays the drums in a rock band.		
111. Smurfbubble	TBA	2021 cartoon show	
111. Smurfbubble	A female Smurf.		
112. Smurffirefly	TBA	2021 cartoon show	
112. Smurffirefly	A female Smurf. She has the ability to light up in the dark.		
113. Ken	N/A	2025 film	Nick Offerman
113. Ken	Papa Smurf's brother.		
114. Moxie	N/A	2025 film	Sandra Oh
114. Moxie	Ken's daughter.		
115. No Name	N/A	2025 film	James Corden
115. No Name	An unnamed Smurf who's the main character of the 2025 film. He isn't to be confused with Nobody Smurf.		
116. Influencer Smurf	N/A	Early version of a trailer for the 2025 film	
116. Influencer Smurf	Social media influencer.		
117. Ron	N/A	2025 film	Kurt Russell
117. Ron	Papa Smurf and Ken's brother.		
118. Worry Smurf	N/A	2025 film	Billie Lourd
118. Worry Smurf	A Smurf who frequently worries about a lot of things.		
119. Sound Effects Smurf	N/A	2025 film	Spencer X
119. Sound Effects Smurf	A male Smurf who mainly communicates by making various sound effects.		
120. International Neighborhood Watch Smurfs	N/A	2025 film	
120. International Neighborhood Watch Smurfs	They are a group of Smurfs who have already made their way into the human world and will serve as knowledgeable allies to the Smurfs from the Smurf Village.		
121. Camouflage Smurf	N/A	2025 film	Chris Miller
121. Camouflage Smurf	A Smurf who can camouflage.		
122. Out of Focus Smurf	N/A	2025 film	
122. Out of Focus Smurf	A Smurf who appears blurry.		
123. Way Back There Smurf	N/A	2025 film	Chris Prynoski
123. Way Back There Smurf	A Smurf who happens to be far away from everyone else.		
124. Handlebar Mustache Smurf	N/A	2025 film	
124. Handlebar Mustache Smurf	A Smurf who has a handlebar mustache.		
125. Quiet Smurf	N/A	2025 film	Chris Prynoski
125. Quiet Smurf	A Smurf who speaks in a quiet voice and whose words sound inaudible.		

== Villains ==
Name	Original French name	Appears in	Voiced by
Gargamel	Gargamel	Comics + 1961 Cartoon + 1981 Cartoon + Movie 1 and 2 + Spin-off Movie + 2021 Cartoon	Jacques Courtois (1960s TV Series); Paul Winchell (1981 series); Hank Azaria (Movie 1 and 2, CGI short films); Rainn Wilson (Smurfs: The Lost Village); André Sogliuzzo (The Smurfs 2 video game); Lenny Mark Irons (2021 Series); J. P. Karliak (Smurfs)
Gargamel	The main antagonist and sworn enemy of the Smurfs, Gargamel is an evil wizard with limited powers. Gargamel is absolutely obsessed with the Smurfs, and his main goal vacillates from trying to eat them to trying to capture them for use in a potion to make gold to simply getting revenge. In the cartoon TV shows, he attempts to eat the Smurfs and in the movies, his motive is to draw off their blue energy which will give him unlimited sorcerous powers. His head is balding, his nose is protuberant, his black robe is worn and patched, and his teeth are rotten.		
Azrael	Azraël	Comics + 1961 Cartoon + 1981 Cartoon + Movie 1 and 2 + Spin-off Movie + 2021 Cartoon	Nelly Beghin (1960s TV Series); Don Messick (1981 Cartoon); Mr. Krinkle the Cat (Movies 1 and 2); Frank Welker (voice, Movies 1 and 2, CGI short films, Smurfs: The Lost Village, 2011–present); Cherise Silvestri (2021 Series); Rachel Butera (Smurfs)
Azrael	Gargamel's pet cat. Although Gargamel never treats him well, Azrael manages to put up with his master. Azrael tends to realize beforehand that Gargamel's schemes will go awry, but reluctantly goes along with them anyway in hopes of possibly capturing a Smurf to eat. Azrael shares Gargamel's distinctive laugh. Azrael was originally female in the comic books, but was changed to a male in the cartoon show and returned as a male in later comics and in the movies. In movie #1, Gargamel cast a spell which landed Azrael on top of his head, and Gargamel realized that he was a boy when he looked from under Azrael's tail. In one episode of the series, Azrael got so tired of Gargamel treating him cruelly that he turned against his master. In the movies, Azrael still remains loyal to Gargamel, although he laughs at his master whenever he gets humiliated or hurt. In movie #2, Azrael becomes so angry with his master that he attacks him when he taunts him about his failure.		
Hogatha	Hogatha	Comics + 1981 Cartoon	Janet Waldo
Hogatha	Hogatha is a character who was created for the television cartoon series, but has appeared in at least one of the comics for the magazine, which has often borrowed stories from episodes of the show. She is an evil, ugly witch who uses her magic to lure unsuspecting suitors and occasionally cause trouble for the Smurfs. Hogatha snorts loudly with her large wart-covered nose. She thinks she is beautiful, although she is actually quite ugly and wears a red wig to cover her baldness. She rides on a long-suffering vulture whose name tends to vary from one episode to another, but the most frequent one is Harold. She and Gargamel dislike each other, and she often refers to him as "Garglesmell". Hogatha used a spell to disguise herself as a Smurf who constantly snorts and causes trouble, under the name Snorty Smurf, in the first-season episode of the 1981 series "The Fake Smurf" (in the book version of the story, Gargamel is the one who changes himself into a Smurf). Regardless of being somehow vain at times during the show, Hogatha seeks to achieve acceptance from others and actively seeks love, showing a good side of her nature.		
Lord Balthazar	Lord Balthazar	1981 Cartoon	Keene Curtis
Lord Balthazar	Lord Balthazar is Gargamel's godfather. Balthazar despises the Smurfs and is actually more cold-hearted than Gargamel in addition to being a more powerful sorcerer. He has a pet raven who acts as his spy, two oafish henchmen, and lives in a large castle whose moat houses a fearsome dragon called a Moat Monster. He has a niece named Denisa, which she befriended Sassette.		
Chlorhydris	Chlorhydris	1981 Cartoon	Amanda McBroom (only in the special My Smurfy Valentine); Linda Gary (in the all other appearances)
Chlorhydris	Chlorhydris is an evil, cold-hearted sorceress, who is more powerful than Hogatha, who devotes her time to removing love from the world. A nasty, irredeemable woman as ugly as she is evil, she lives in a gloomy castle all alone, except for an unnamed talking pet toucan and a manservant named Reeves who also drives her carriage. Her backstory was revealed in a number of episodes. In season 3's "The Tears of a Smurf," it is revealed she once married a nobleman, by whom she had a daughter named Priscilla. Chlorhydris then became insanely jealous over her husband loving her daughter more than he loved her. She caused her husband's disappearance and Priscilla, who was just a toddler at that time, grew up in a castle without love. Enraged when a young prince fell in love with her daughter, Chlorhydris used her malignant magic to cause the young man to also disappear and put a curse of ugliness on Priscilla to keep anyone else from falling in love with her. In the season 7 episode "Chlorhydris' Lost Love," it is revealed that she was once kind and caring, but became hateful when her true love was stolen away from her.		
Nemesis	Némésis	1981 Cartoon	Frank Welker
Nemesis	Nemesis is a sinister, hiccupping creature shrouded in a purple robe, and he's Grandpa Smurf's longtime enemy. He is an evil wizard like Gargamel, only much more powerful. He is constantly trying to steal the Long-Life Stone, which is the magical artifact that grants the Smurfs their extremely long lifespans. He was once a human but after a magical accident, he became so grotesque that people were horrified at the sight of his face, so he kept his hood over it.		
Scruple	Scrupule	1981 Cartoon	Brenda Vaccaro
Scruple	Scruple is Gargamel's apprentice. Scruple was expelled from a school for wizards and lives with Gargamel as kind of an indentured servant, even though neither one enjoys being with the other. Like Azrael, Scruple often sees the flaws in Gargamel's schemes and whenever he offers a suggestion, Gargamel often accepts it as his own idea. He shows Gargamel little respect, often calling him "Gargie" to his face.		
Count Gregorian	Comte Grégore	1981 Cartoon	Paul Winchell
Count Gregorian	Count Gregorian is an evil wizard who only appeared in the Season 2 episode "The Raven Wizard". He was originally thought to be Princess Sabina's new tutor, but it was revealed that he was the legendary Raven Wizard, cursed with the head of a raven when the temporary spell to restore his human head wore off. He kidnapped Sabina, whose beauty he needed to restore his human face with the aid of a magical gem called the Heart Diamond, even though she would be drained of her life's energy as a result. He failed when Johan and Peewit entered his castle, the latter causing the Heart Diamond to explode, turning the wizard completely into a raven.		
Mordain	Mordain	1981 Cartoon	Paul Winchell
Mordain	Mordain is an evil court wizard who solely appears is role main antagonist's in the Season 2 episode "The Good, The Bad and The Smurfy". He captured Papa Smurf, Smurfette, Clumsy Smurf and Brainy Smurf to entertain his master King Argon and his knights on the king's birthday. He then turned them into frogs so that he could steal the king's gold. When the other Smurfs entered the castle to free the captured Smurfs, Papa Smurf turned him into a frog, where he now spends his days eating flies, and turned King Argon and the knights back to normal.		
Bacchus	Bacchus	1981 Cartoon	Paul Winchell
Bacchus	Bacchus is an evil Roman-era wizard and the guardian of paradise, whose one and only appearance is in the Season 1 episode "Paradise Smurfed". He pretended to let the Smurfs, who went to his paradise, do as they please, but, by distracting them with a game of hide-and-seek, he later showed his true nature - he wanted to eat the Smurfs, for his dinner. When the Smurfs fled, he transformed himself into a black cloud, causing rain and thunderstorms, and made ice, but Lazy Smurf was able to wake up, returning to the real world, and escaping the wizard.		
Lady Imperia	Tante Imperia	1981 Cartoon	
Lady Imperia	The evil aunt and guardian of the boy Prince/King Gerard, Lady Imperia appears only as main antagonist in the Season 1 episode "The Clockwork Smurf", in which she and her henchman Thorick have locked her nephew up in a dungeon cell, pretending to his subjects that he is ill and has to be isolated, giving her the excuse to rule in his place as regent. She plans to eventually give the false news that Gerard is dead so that she can rule permanently, leaving her nephew to rot in his cell. The Smurfs and Clockwork Smurf help Gerard to escape and expose her and she is banished from the kingdom, never to return. Although other equally evil relatives of Gerard, namely his uncle Sir Leopold in "Return of the Clockwork Smurf" and his cousin Malcolm the Mean in "The Noble Stag", also wanted to take away his throne by trickery.		
Wartmongers	Verruqueux / Crapaudémons	1981 Cartoon	Various voices for each one
Wartmongers	The Wartmongers are little toad-like creatures who live in the muck and slime of Creepy Deepy Swamp and often cause the Smurfs problems. They consider having more warts than others as a source of pride. They like ripping the wings off of the Pussywillow Pixies. Like the Pussywillow Pixies at first, they think that Smurfs are hairy, red-eyed monsters. The following are the known Wartmongers: King Bullrush (voiced by Kenneth Mars) is the king of the Wartmongers who commands his minions to do his bidding.; Slag (voiced by Hamilton Camp) is King Bullrush's jester.; Slop is a Wartmonger hunter.; Slime (voiced by Will Ryan) is a Wartmonger hunter.; Sludge (voiced by Hal Smith) is a Wartmonger hunter.; Wartless is a young Wartmonger who has no warts and tries to associate himself with the Wartmonger hunters.; Mad Mudmasher is a Wartmonger wrestler.; Horrible Hunk Hopper is a Wartmonger wrestler from New Croak City.; Ooze is a Wartmonger that is a member of a group of Wartmonger rebels that oppose King Bullrush.; Bildge is a Wartmonger that is a member of a group of Wartmonger rebels that oppose King Bullrush.; The Wartmongers have appeared in "The Pussywillow Pixies", "Papa's Worry Warts", "Mud Wrestling Smurfs", "Babes in Wartland", "Kow-Tow, We Won't Bow", "The Great Slime Crop Failure", "A Loss of Smurf", "Scarlet Croaker" "The Most Unsmurfy Game", and "Jokey's Cloak".		
Mummy	Maman	Comics + 1981 Cartoon + 2021 Cartoon	June Foray (1981 series); Unknown (2021 Series)
Mummy	Mummy (as she is called by her son) is a mean, quarrelsome old witch who is the mother of Gargamel. She occasionally makes unannounced visits to her son, usually to berate him over his inability to catch the Smurfs. Also when she visits, she insists on doing the cooking at which she is terrible as both her son and Azrael can attest. She also hates cats and always throws Azrael out of Gargamel's hovel when she arrives to visit. Due to the interference of the Smurfs as Gargamel keeps claiming, the baron called the wedding off. This caused Gargamel to be dealt with by his mother when they get home. When Madame Lavinia states that she still would like to be paid her commission for this involvement, she states that her son "will pay."		
Morphio	Morphio	1981 Cartoon	Unknown
Morphio	Morphio is a dream demon. He owns a fire-breathing horse named Nightmare who serves as his mode of transportation. Morphio first appears in "Lazy's Nightmare" where he captures Lazy and baits the other Smurfs into getting captured. With help from Papa Smurf, Lazy thwarts Morphio. In "Sleepless Smurfs", Mophio originally haunts Gargamel's dreams until they learn that they have a mutual enemy in the Smurfs. In their collaboration, Morphio and Gargamel steal the Sleepy Sheep from the Land of Nod in order to give all the Smurfs insomnia. This time, the Smurfs lure Morphio out of the Dream World where he fell into a deep sleep.		
Corbelius		Comics	
Corbelius	Corbelius is a black crow that is Gargamel's other pet in the comics, appearing far less frequently than Azrael. He serves Gargamel primarily in delivering letters, usually threats or ransom demands to the Smurfs. Unlike Azrael, Corbelius does not seem to take any malicious pleasure in what he does; if anything, he seems indifferent.		
Monty		Movie Smurfs: The Lost Village	Dee Bradley Baker
Monty	Monty is a vulture-like bird that is Gargamel's other pet in the Lost Village movie. Monty seems to be Gargamel's favorite, even though he seems like a lesser intellect, which irritates Azrael to no end. Monty does have a mean streak and can get quite angry, but seems more content with being dopey. Monty bears an uncanny resemblance to the titular creature from the episode The Howlibird.		
Rowena		2021 Cartoon	TBA
Rowena	Rowena is Gargamel's pre-teen niece who is often dropped off at his doorstep by Mummy, together with her brother Dwayne, much to the evil wizard's annoyance. She is depicted as a mischievous character who often tries to trick or capture the Smurfs. She and Dwayne bears an uncanny resemblance to Scruple, Gargamel's apprentice from the 1981 series.		
Dwayne		2021 Cartoon	TBA
Dwayne	Dwayne is Gargamel's pre-teen nephew who is often dropped off at his doorstep by Mummy, together with his sister Rowena, much to the evil wizard's annoyance. Just like his sister, He is depicted as a mischievous character who often tries to trick or capture the Smurfs. He and Rowena bears an uncanny resemblance to Scruple, Gargamel's apprentice from the 1981 series.		
Gulp		2021 Cartoon	TBA
Gulp	Gulp is Rowena's pet carnivorous plant. From what Rowena says, she is quite obedient, always accompanying her, and is fed regularly. She is a parallel for dogs in 2021 series, as she frequently barks. She bears an uncanny resemblance to the Carnivorous Daisy from the comic book and 1981 cartoon adaptation story called The Smurfs and the Howlibird, And the Snap Dragons from the two episodes of Season 7 of the 80s series called Smurf Pet & All The News That's Fit To Smurf.		
Razamel		2025 film	J. P. Karliak
Razamel	Gargamel's brother.		
Asmodius		2025 film	Octavia Spencer
Asmodius	An intergalactic evil wizard.		
Chernobog		2025 film	Nick Kroll
Chernobog	An intergalactic evil wizard.		
Jezebeth		2025 film	Hannah Waddingham
Jezebeth	An intergalactic evil wizard.		
Joel		2025 film	Dan Levy
Joel	Razamel's assistant.		

== Supportings ==
Name	Original French name	Appears in	Voiced by
Johan and Peewit	Johan et Pirlouit	Comics + 1981 Cartoon	Johan: Grant Gottschall (in The Smurfs and the Magic Flute), Michael Bell (1981 series); Peewit: Cam Clarke (in The Smurfs and the Magic Flute), Frank Welker (1981 series)
Johan and Peewit	Johan is a young human squire and page boy of an unnamed king near the Smurf village. He defends his king fiercely, and is often helpful to other people. He meets the dwarf (or child/goblin in the 1981 cartoon) Peewit (pronounced pee-wee), and they become best friends. It was in a Johan and Peewit adventure published in 1958 that the Smurfs were first introduced. The Smurfs would appear in some of the later adventures of Johan and Peewit, as well as their own series. In the Hanna-Barbera cartoon series during the second season, Johan and Peewit were occasionally featured in stories which focused on the pair and the kingdom they protected. Johan rides a white horse named Bayard, and Peewit rides a goat named Biquette (Nanny in The Smurfs and the Magic Flute). Peewit sings in an off-key voice and is always hungry. The Johan and Peewit episodes of the Hanna-Barbera cartoon shown in France are distributed under the title Johan et Pirlouit.		
Feathers	La Cigogne	Comics + 1981 Cartoon + Movie	
Feathers	Feathers is a large white stork that is a loyal friend to the Smurfs. He both provides transportation and delivers messages when needed.		
Father Time	Père Temps	Comics + 1981 Cartoon	Alan Oppenheimer
Father Time	Father Time (portrayed in the classic image of the wizened old man with a white robe and scythe) is a good friend of the Smurfs and Mother Nature that is in charge of running time's course. His Reverse Clock was responsible for turning three Smurfs into Smurflings and he is unable to undo the transformation due to how time works.		
Enchanter Homnibus	Homnibus	Comics + 1981 Cartoon	Jack Angel
Enchanter Homnibus	Homnibus is an old human wizard and friend of Papa Smurf, Sir Johan, and Peewit. He was the one who gave Puppy to the Smurfs. Papa Smurf often visits him to discuss matters of magic and to play chess. Enchanter Homnibus first introduced Johan and Peewit to the Smurfs. Homnibus has a young servant named Olivier.		
King	Le Roi	Comics + 1981 Cartoon	Bob Holt
King	This unnamed king is the ruler of the kingdom where Sir Johan and Peewit live and whom they both serve. He is somewhat carefree, but he is also firm and much loved by his subjects as well as a good friend of the Smurfs. He has a beautiful niece and Princess Sabina, but has no direct descendants. He can be very keen to go on expeditions and battles....which can be difficult given his old age.		
Laura	Laura	1981 Cartoon	Russi Taylor
Laura	Laura is a young girl who appeared only in the Season 2 episode "Sister Smurf". She bonds with Smurfette over the fact that both girls feel that their respective families do not appreciate their antics. Running away together, they enter a deserted-looking shack in the middle of the forest, only to find it is occupied by a nasty hag who wants to keep them as slaves in her house forever. Fortunately for the two girls, the other Smurfs and Laura's brothers and father come to their rescue.		
Mother Nature	Dame Nature	Comics + 1981 Cartoon	June Foray
Mother Nature	Mother Nature is in charge of the smooth running of nature's course. She is a good friend of the Smurfs and often works with Father Time. In one episode, her brother Harold is revealed to be the Man in the Moon.		
Bigmouth	Grossbouf	Comics + 1981 Cartoon + 2021 Cartoon	Lennie Weinrib (1981 series); Davis Freeman (2021 series)
Bigmouth	Bigmouth is a gigantic, clumsy, dimwitted ogre whose size, insatiable appetite, and clueless disposition are the cause of endless trouble for the Smurfs, like stealing their Smurfberries and other foods, although he is not really considered their enemy. He also frequently breaks into Gargamel's hovel and eats his food and also eats rocks (which he likes dipped in slime). Bigmouth is friends with whoever may be offering him something in exchange. In other words, he will either help Gargamel or help the Smurfs, depending on who is offering more in return (usually food). Bigmouth's sweetheart and eventual wife is an ogress named Big Nose. Bigmouth also has a nephew named Bigfeet and Bigmouth wants The Smurflings to take care of Bigfeet, when he and Big Nose goes to the Orge ball. In the 2021 series, Bigmouth is depicted as wanting to actively eat the Smurfs.		
Pussywillow Pixies	Elfes des Chatons de Saule	1981 Cartoon	Various voices for each one
Pussywillow Pixies	The Pussywillow Pixies look like tiny humans with wings, most of the ones seen being attractive females. They are afraid of the Wartmongers who try to catch them and clip off their wings so that they can make them their slaves. At first, they believed that the only thing worse than a Wartmonger was a Smurf. After being convinced that Smurfs are not actually hairy, red-eyed monsters as they had always believed, they befriended the Smurfs. The Pussywillow Pixies became friends because the Smurfs saved them from being turned into the Wartmongers' slaves and getting their wings ripped off. There are at least six that appear in the 1981 series: Elderberry (voiced by Peggy Webber) is the leader of the Pussywillow Pixies.; Pansy (voiced by Susan Blu) is a clumsy pixie who is good friends with Clumsy Smurf.; Lilac is a vain pixie with a Southern accent; Acorn (voiced by Patricia Parris) is the youngest and the smallest, who was very jealous of Baby Smurf.; Bramble is the green pixie.; Holly is the red-headed pixie who also sports green clothes.		
King Gerard	Roi Gérard	1981 Cartoon	Philip Proctor
King Gerard	Gerard is a child prince who befriends the Smurfs before becoming king. The Smurfs help him defeat his evil aunt Lady Imperia who tries to take the crown for herself. The lonely Gerard finds a best friend in Clockwork Smurf, who decides to stay with the young king rather than return to the Smurf village. King Gerard rules over a separate kingdom from the one ruled by the unnamed king that Johann and Peewit serve. However, the two kings are related through Gerard's cousin Princess Sabina and the two kingdoms are apparently at peace.		
Princess Sabina	Princesse Sabina	Comics + 1981 Cartoon	Jennifer Darling
Princess Sabina	Princess Sabina is the niece of the unnamed king who employs Johan and Peewit and who, like them, is aware of the Smurfs' existence. Sabina is a red-headed young woman who is not content under the tutelage of Dame Barbara, who tries to teach her the importance of how to sew, pour tea, and otherwise be a "proper princess." She is an expert marksman and rider, and is good friends with Johan, whom she sometimes accompanies on his adventures (there appears to be a mutual attraction between the two). Sabina is also the cousin of another nearby king named King Gerard.		
Dame Barbara	Dame Barbe	Comics + 1981 Cartoon	Linda Gary
Dame Barbara	Princess Sabina's strict governess who has a bit of a feud with Peewit. She is the only member of the unnamed king's household who is unaware of the Smurfs' existence. She was also called Lady Prattle in The Smurfs and the Magic Flute. She will do pretty much anything to prevent Sabina from having fun.		
Sandman	Marchand de Sable	1981 Cartoon	Frank Welker
Sandman	The Sandman is a being who lives in the Land of Nod and often departs it at dusk to put people to sleep with his magic sand. During the day, the Sandman is sleeping. While the Sandman that Papa Smurf knows is a jolly figure, the version of the Sandman that appeared in "Darkness Monster" is a cranky old man in pajamas who stated to Papa Smurf that the previous Sandman has retired. Papa Smurf and the Smurflings try to get the Sandman to help them by giving them some of his sand to make Brainy a new pair of glasses. He turned them down until Papa Smurf's persistent harmonica playing got him to change his mind. The Sandman agreed to help them out in exchange for the chocolate that is in the Darkness Cavern. Once that was done, the Sandman kept his end of the deal by giving them a bag of sand. In "Lazy's Nightmare", Papa Smurf tries to enlist the Sandman to help him enter the Dream World in order to save the Smurfs from Morphio to no avail.		
Madame Lavinia	Madame Lavinia	1981 Cartoon	
Madame Lavinia	Madame Lavinia is a marriage broker who appeared twice in the cartoon. She was first seen in "Wedding Bells for Gargamel" where Gargamel's mother assigned her to help hook Gargamel up with a baron's daughter named Andiria. Due to the interference of the Smurfs, the baron called the wedding off which caused Gargamel's mother to deal with Gargamel when they get home. When Madame Lavinia states that she still wants to get paid her commission for this involvement, Gargamel's mother states that her son "will pay." In the episode "The Prince and the Hopper," Lady Jasmine enlisted Madame Lavinia to fulfil her plans to marry Prince Theodore for his money.		
Brenda	Brenda	1981 Cartoon	Norma MacMillan (in "The Littlest Witch"), Russi Taylor (in "Scruple's Sweetheart")
Brenda	A young witch from Witch Hazel Conservatory whom the Smurfs teach to be a good witch. She is good friends with Smurfette. She appears in season 3's The Littlest Witch and in season 6's Scruple's Sweetheart of the 1981 series, where she falls head-over-heels for Scruple, until she realizes he is only pretending to be in love with her because he wants her wand.		
Puppy	Puppy	Comics + 1981 Cartoon	Frank Welker
Puppy	Puppy is a magical creature that was designed to look like a dog. He was offered as a gift to Papa Smurf by Homnibus. It was Baby Smurf, however, who opened the enchanted locket around Puppy's neck and became the dog's true master. Puppy is a good friend to the Smurflings and protects the Smurfs from Gargamel's cat Azrael.		
Chitter		Comics + 1981 Cartoon	Don Messick
Chitter	Chitter is a young brown squirrel who is the best friend of Wild Smurf. Indeed, Wild regards him as family since it was Chitter's great-great-great-great-grandmother who found him as a lost baby and raised him as part of her litter. Often Chitter rallies to the side of Wild and the other Smurfs whenever they are threatened by an enemy, such as Gargamel. It is revealed in the episode "Wild about Smurfette" that Chitter has acquired a mate and has a litter of his own, with Wild happily regarding himself as a kind of godfather.		
Smoogle	Smoogle	1981 Cartoon	Frank Welker
Smoogle	Smoogle is Nanny Smurf's pet. He is a magenta-colored marsupial-type animal who resembles a rabbit. Nanny adores him and is known to be a little overprotective of him. In the episode "G'Day Smoogle", it is revealed that there is an entire village of Smoogles living in Australia.		
Gourdy	Gourdy	Cartoon	Marvin Kaplan
Gourdy	A small humanoid genie in Arabic attire whose home, whose name implies, is a gourd found in Farmer Smurf's field and he can grant wishes but only to their master. He appeared in three episodes of Season 6 (Farmer's Genie, Master Scruple and The Tallest Smurf) of the 1981 series. He is the master of Farmer Smurf and grants him any wishes he wants when Farmer Smurf found him. Unlike many other genies Gourdy can grant unlimited wishes. At one point in the episode "Master Scruple", Gourdy was the master of Scruple and Gargamel, but eventually he became the master of Farmer Smurf at the end of the episode. In the episode "The Tallest Smurf", Gourdy makes Slouchy's wish come by making him big and the rest of the Smurfs small sized. But at the end of the episode, Slouchy and Farmer wants Gourdy to turn the Smurfs back to normal size and that was done and Slouchy was back to his normal size. He was inspired by Pierrot's Genie, an unnamed character who appeared in Pierrot and the lamp comic series.		
Selwyn and Tallulah Quarrell		1981 Cartoon	N/A
Selwyn and Tallulah Quarrell	Selwyn and Tallulah Quarrel have appeared in several episodes of the cartoon television series. They are a married sorcerer and sorceress who love each other, yet as their surname implies, they frequently get into arguments during which they turn each other into all kinds of creepy things, then kiss and make up. They are good friends with Papa Smurf, Homnibus, and Peewit. In one episode ("Memory Melons"), the Quarrels celebrate their 200th wedding anniversary, but their tendency to fight almost ruins the party, their home and the forest; however the Smurfs help them reconcile. Their home is Quarrel Castle, which they share with their pet gargoyle Tharp (who was a guest at the wedding of Laconia and Woody) and the amiable ghost of Selwyn's great-uncle Fenwick Quarrel.		
Laconia	Laconia	1981 Cartoon	Laconia has no lines.
Laconia	Laconia is a wood elf who is mute and does sign language in order to speak. As a friend of Papa Smurf, she is often employed when sound or silence magic creates trouble. In the cartoon, she owns the wand of love which looks like a flower on a stick and gives flowers life. The flowers of the world are her life-force.		
Woody	Woody	1981 Cartoon	Hamilton Camp
Woody	Woody is also a wood elf who is in love with Laconia. Their wedding took place in the special "Smurfily Ever After".		
Marina		1981 Cartoon	N/A
Marina	Marina is a beautiful mermaid and the love interest of Handy Smurf.		
Flowerbell	Belle-Fleur	1981 Cartoon	Mona Marshall
Flowerbell	Flowerbell is a wood nymph who lives in the forest with all the woodland creatures. She appears in the Season 2 episode "Papa's Wedding Day" of the 1981 series, in which she is captured by Lord Balthazar, who offers her her freedom if she helps him in a plot to lure Papa Smurf into a trap through getting him to fall in love with her. Flowerbell initially agrees, but grows to regret the deal, especially when Papa Smurf falls so seriously in love with her that he actually proposes marriage, despite misgivings from the other Smurfs. In the end, although Flowerbell does go through with the deal, she ends up rescuing Papa Smurf from Lord Balthazar with the help of the other Smurfs. Flowerbell also makes a cameo appearance in Smurfily Ever After, as a guest at Woody and Laconia's wedding.		
Melina	Melina	1981 Cartoon	N/A
Melina	Like Brenda, Melina is a good little child witch who appears in a Season 7 episode of the cartoon series "Sassette's Bewitching Friendship". She attends a school for good witches, but although she means well, her magic never quite works out right. She becomes good friends with Sassette, who helps her retrieve her flying broom when Gargamel steals it to catch the Smurfs.		
Denisa	Agnès	1981 Cartoon	Katie Leigh
Denisa	Denisa is Lord Balthazar's niece. Denisa and Sassette become best friends after they save each other's lives from a pack of wolves. She appears in Season 8 of the 1981 series in the episodes "A Smurf for Denisa", "Denisa's Greedy Doll", and "Denisa's Slumber Party".		
Squeaky		1981 Cartoon	Frank Welker
Squeaky	Squeaky is a mouse that appears in Season 2 of the 1981 series in the episode named after him. Smurfette gives him his name after she finds him lying sick in the woods and brings him home, where she nurses him back to health with Papa Smurf's help. Reluctantly she lets him go when he is well at Papa Smurf's insistence, but Squeaky obviously wants to stay with her, so she happily adopts him as a pet. But the mouse unexpectedly dies, leaving Smurfette heartbroken to the point that she isolates herself. In the end, she realizes she needs to move on, and bids her departed pet goodbye.		
Patrick Winslow		Movie	Neil Patrick Harris
Patrick Winslow	A new character for the movie who works at Anjelou Cosmetics. He is the husband of Grace who helps the Smurfs. In the second movie, he used to have a pet parrot named Zeus (which served as a reminder of his father who left the family) until Victor got rid of it due to Patrick's allergy to feathers.		
Grace Winslow		Movie	Jayma Mays
Grace Winslow	A new character for the movie who is married to Patrick. She is pregnant with her first child in the movie and gives birth to their son Blue by the end of the movie.		
Elway		Movie	Hank (Dog)
Elway	Patrick and Grace's pet Basset Hound that appeared in the first and second movie.		
Odile Anjelou		Movie	Sofía Vergara
Odile Anjelou	A new character for the movie. An executive at a French cosmetics company called Anjelou Cosmetics who is the boss of Patrick.		
Henri		Movie	Tim Gunn
Henri	A new character for the movie. He serves as Odile's executive assistant at Anjelou Cosmetics as he advises Patrick to "make it work."		
Victor Doyle		Movie	Brendan Gleeson
Victor Doyle	Patrick Winslow's stepfather who debuts in the second movie. He owns a corn dog business.		
Blue Winslow		Movie	Nicholas Martorell Jr. and Jacob Tremblay
Blue Winslow	Patrick and Grace Winslow's son who was born in the first movie and debuts in the second movie.		
Snappy Bug		Movie Smurfs: The Lost Village	Bret Marnell
Snappy Bug	Brainy's ladybug assistant.		
Leaf		2021 The Smurfs	Jade Wheeler
Leaf	Leaf is a nature fairy destined to replace Mother Nature.		
Voltaire		2021 The Smurfs	TBA
Voltaire	Voltaire is a young dragon who lives in a cave near the Smurf village.		
Mama Poot		2025 film	Natasha Lyonne
Mama Poot	The leader of the Snooterpoots.		
Turtle		2025 film	Marshmello
Turtle	A turtle who is friends with the Smurfs and lives near the Smurf village.		
Tardigrade		2025 film	Jimmy Kimmel
Tardigrade	A green worm-like creature with eight legs.		
Jaunty		2025 film	Amy Sedaris
Jaunty	A sentient book who gives No Name Smurf magical powers.		
