= Smurf (disambiguation) =

A smurf is a fictional, tiny, blue humanoid from The Smurfs, created by Belgian cartoonist Peyo in 1958.

Smurf, smurfs, SMURF or smurfing may also refer to:

== Arts, entertainment, and media ==
=== The Smurfs ===
- The Smurfs, a franchise
- Smurf (Smurf language), an undefinable word and derivatives (including "smurfing") used as both verb and noun within the fictional Smurfs franchise
- Smurfette, a female character from The Smurfs
- The Smurfs (comics), Belgian comic series, created by Peyo
- The Smurfs (film), a 2011 film directed by Raja Gosnell, based on the comic franchise
- Smurfs (film), a 2025 animated film
- The Smurfs (1961 TV series), a 1961 Belgian animated TV series, based on the comic franchise
- The Smurfs (1981 TV series), a 1981–1989 American-Belgian animated TV series that aired on NBC, based on the comic franchise
- The Smurfs (2021 TV series), a 2021 animated television series, based on the comic franchise
- The Smurfs (video game), a 2011 video game
- The Smurfs merchandising
- The Smurfs music
- Les Aventures des Schtroumpfs

=== Other uses in arts, entertainment, and media ===
- Janine "Smurf" Cody, a fictional character played by Jacki Weaver in the 2010 Australian film Animal Kingdom and by Ellen Barkin in the USA TV series
- Smurfing, or twinking, a deceptive player practice in online video gaming
- The Smurf (dance), a 1980s dance fad
- "The Smurf", a single by Tyrone Brunson
- The Smurfs, a rap band with Bernard Fowler

== Science and technology ==
- Smurf attack, a type of denial of service (DoS) attack on computer networks
- SMURF1, an enzyme that in humans is encoded by the SMURF1 gene
- SMURF2, an enzyme that in humans is encoded by the SMURF2 gene
- SMURFs, smartphone spyware by GCHQ and the NSA in their WARRIOR PRIDE kit
- Stepped-frequency microwave radiometer, a microwave radiometer known as "smurf" from its abbreviation SFMR

== Other uses ==
- Smurfing (financial crime) or "structuring", a term related to money laundering
- Smurfing (methamphetamine production), the hiring of multiple individuals to exceed legal limits for purchase of pseudoephedrine for methamphetamine production
- Smurfs another name for the Australian Association Football team Sydney FC given by rival supporters due to the teams sky blue and white colour scheme.
