= Johan and Peewit =

Belgian comics series

Johan and Peewit (Johan et Pirlouit)
- Date: 1947-2001
- No. of issues: 17
- Main characters: Johan and Peewit
- Publisher: Dupuis and Le Lombard

Creative team
- Writers: Peyo and Studio Peyo
- Artists: Peyo and Studio Peyo
- Creator: Peyo

Original publication
- Published in: Spirou magazine
- Language: French

Chronology
- Followed by: The Smurfs

Johan and Peewit (French: Johan et Pirlouit, pronounced [ʒoan e piʁlwi]) is a Belgian comics series created by Peyo and named after the two main characters. Since its initial appearance in 1947, it has been published in 13 albums that appeared before the death of Peyo in 1992. Thereafter, a team of comic book creators from Studio Peyo continued to publish the stories.

The series is set in Medieval Europe, and mainly concerns the adventures of Johan, a young squire and his jester sidekick Peewit, and includes elements of sword-and-sorcery. It is also notable for branching out into The Smurfs franchise, following their first introduction in the 1958 story The Smurfs and the Magic Flute.

== Publication history ==
Initially titled simply Johan, the series first appeared in the newspaper La Dernière Heure in 1947 and then in Le Soir from 1950 until 1952. It began publication in the Franco-Belgian comics magazine Spirou on 11 September 1952 and the initially blond-haired hero became dark-haired.

In 1954, Johan was joined by Pirlouit, and the series took its final name. It was in Johan et Pirlouit, on 23 October 1958, that the first smurf appeared.

Peyo stated that Pirlouit was his favourite character, and Johan et Pirlouit was the only series on which he always did the drawings without the aid of the studio. Their adventures appeared regularly in Spirou in the 1950s and early 1960s, but the success of the Smurfs meant that they were much neglected afterwards, aside from a very short one-off adventure in 1977. However, following Peyo's death, other artists and writers have revived the series with 4 more albums between 1994 and 2001.

== Synopsis ==
Johan and Peewit set off on adventure, with Peewit "singing" a fabliau in Old French

Set in the Middle Ages in an unnamed European kingdom, the series follows the adventures of Johan, a brave young page to the King, and Peewit, his faithful, if boastful and cheating, dwarf sidekick. Johan rides off in search of adventure with his trusty horse Bayard, while Peewit gallops sporadically, and grudgingly, behind on his goat, Biquette. The pair are driven by duty to their King and the courage to defend the underpowered. Struggles for power between deposed lords and usurping villains form the basis of many of the plots which also contain elements of detective fiction as the pair hunt down traitors and outlaws, as well as fantasy, with witches and sorcerers, giants, ghosts and, above all, the Smurfs.

The first few adventures did not feature Peewit. From his first appearance in 1947, Johan had a number of solo adventures and met Peewit in 1954, thus, in line with many other comic series of the time, giving Johan's earnest hero a comic relief sidekick similar to Tintin's Captain Haddock, Lucky Luke's Rantanplan, Asterix's Obelix, or Spirou's Fantasio.

== Characters ==
- Johan: A squire to the King who later ascends to the rank of knight. Johan is a capable leader and a talented combatant, as he is shown to be skilled swordfighter, archer, and hand-to-hand fighter. He is the quintessential bold fighter, always ready to be in the thick of it, and a natural leader. Johan is quick to intervene whenever he sees an injustice being committed and will go all the way to rectify wrongs, ignoring Peewit's grumblings about the problems that they are going to face in the process. His name is pronounced "Yohahn".
- Peewit: ("Pirlouit" in the original French) A blond, gluttonous dwarf and Johan's best friend, he lived in the forest neighboring the King's castle playing practical jokes on the people and stealing meats and apples before being hired as the court jester. He agreed, provided that he was not obliged to wear the jester's outfit, which he felt made him look like a "fool" (which is another term for jester). His name is pronounced "Peewee".
  Contrary to what he believes himself, Peewit is a terrible musician, though. Unlike Cacofonix from the Asterix series, the other inhabitants of the castle cannot bring themselves to tell him how bad he is — though the King did once make a show of removing earplugs in Peewit's presence. His "music" has also been known to cause rain.
  Peewit is easily upset, especially when Johan volunteers him to go on another adventure but, being cunning and agile, he is quite capable of escaping from a tight corner and putting up a fight. When outwitting his enemies, he screams out his cry of triumph: "Peeeewiiiiit". In the Smurfs cartoon series, rather than being a random dwarf, he styles himself as the King's nephew, as he states in the episode The Sorcery Of Maltrochu, and is portrayed as a kid, younger than Johan.
- Bayard: Johan's horse and primary mount who typically accompanies him and Peewit on their various adventures. He is shown to be very loyal & protective of Johan and Peewit, having traveled to many lands and formed a strong bond with both of them. Bayard is also shown to be close with Biquette, Peewit's mount, with the two being capable of limited non-verbal communication. Bayard is typically portrayed as being a white stallion with black spots, although he has on occasion been depicted as being a chestnut shade. Bayard's exact breed of horse is never made clear in the series. He shares his name with the legendary horse Bayard from medieval European (including Belgium) folklore, although it is unknown if their shared name is coincidental or intentional.
- Biquette: Peewit's goat and primary mount who often accompanies him and Johan on their various adventures. She is very loyal to Peewit and Johan, and often assists them in battle against various enemies with her powerful horn attack. Biquette is also shown to be close to Bayard, Johan's mount, to the extent that the two can communicate with the other in a limited capacity. Biquette is depicted as a black nanny goat with a white splash near her mouth. Biquette's exact breed of goat is never made exactly clear in the series. Her name means "young female goat" in French, and she is named after a goat that belonged to Nine Culliford, the wife of series creator Peyo, as a child. Biquette is a common nickname in French for goats.
- The King: The unnamed monarch of the Kingdom. He is somewhat carefree and enjoys wine but is also firm and is loved by his subjects and vassals. He has a beautiful niece, but no direct descendants. He can be very keen to go on expeditions and battles — which can be difficult given his old age.
- Homnibus: An enchanter whom the heroes often consult on matters of magic. He is also an alchemist and herbalist. It is he who first tells Johan and Peewit about the beings called the Smurfs.
- Olivier: Homnibus' young servant.
- Rachel: An old sorceress, who has a terrible reputation, but is actually very kind and helpful. She knows how to make many different potions, including a mixture called Wine of Giddiness.
- Count Tremaine: ("Comte Tréville" in the original French) A skilled knight and brave warrior, he is a friend and role model to Johan.
- Lady Barbara: Usually called "Dame Barbara" in the cartoon series; an old aristocratic woman who resides in the King's castle, always wearing a green dress. She has a reputation for being a gossip, as well as being somewhat prideful and stuck-up.
- The Smurfs: The Smurfs appear in several stories as Johan and Peewit's allies. While the Smurfs have their own series, adventures with their two human friends remain part of the "Johan and Peewit" series. Papa Smurf's knowledge of magic is especially helpful.
  - Papa Smurf: The leader of the Smurfs.
  - Smurfette: A female Smurf created by Gargamel. She was originally the only female Smurf prior to the introduction of Sassette and Nanny in the 1981 TV series, Vexy in The Smurfs 2, and the Smurf Girls in Smurfs: The Lost Village and the 2021 Smurfs cartoon series. (she only features in the Smurfs cartoon series and the upcoming Johan and Peewit cartoon series).
  - Brainy Smurf: (he only features in The Smurfs and the Magic Flute and Smurfs cartoon series).
  - Hefty Smurf: (he only features in The Smurfs and the Magic Flute and Smurfs cartoon series).
  - Clumsy Smurf: (he only features in The Smurfs and the Magic Flute and Smurfs cartoon series).
  - Dopey Smurf/Dimwitty Smurf:
- Princess Sabina: Niece to the King. She is pretty but hates ladylike things and is an excellent marksman (she only features in the Smurfs cartoon series, but is based on Princess Anne, who appears in the third book).

== Merchandising ==
While never as popular as the Smurfs, Johan and certainly Peewit enjoyed their share of fame and popularity as well, and consequently some merchandising was made. In 1959, a first Peewit figurine was made by Dupuis, followed a few years later by a Johan. In the 1970s, Bully and Schleich made Johan and Peewit figurines in their series of PVC Smurf figurines. Plush puppets were made as well.

== In other media and comics ==
- Originally a Johan and Peewit adventure, The Smurfs and the Magic Flute was adapted into an animated film in 1976 in Europe, with considerable success. It was re-released in 1983 in the wake of the success of the Smurfs cartoons from Hanna-Barbera, and enjoyed some success in the USA as well.
- Johan and Peewit were also featured in some of the animated Smurf cartoons, being the main stars in many episodes. In France and other European countries, their TV cartoon adventures were treated as a separate series from that of the Smurfs, even though the latter feature heavily.
- In the early 1980s, some records about their adventures were made in France and Italy, contributors including Cristina D'Avena.
- On July 11, 2024, a new animated series focused on Johan and Peewit was announced by Peyo Productions titled Tales of Johan & Peewit. The series modernizes the characters with a blend of 2D and 3D animation styled. The Smurfs are supporting characters in the series.
- Another Peyo series was Benoît Brisefer (best known in English as "Benny Breakiron") about a little boy with extraordinary strength. Benoît's adventures are set in modern times. In one episode a man strongly resembling Johan can be seen signing into a luxury hotel near a film studio — he even wears a brown jacket and red trousers similar to Johan's; in another, a newspaper indicates the announcement of a film called Johan: The Return II with a photo of Johan next to it, and Biquette makes a cameo appearance in the same volume.
- When the Smurfs got their own series, Johan and Peewit did not feature. However, they did appear in a 2008 Smurf adventure called "The Flute Smurfers" (French: Les schtroumpfeurs de flûte). This story, published to mark the 50th anniversary of the first appearance of the Smurfs, is a prequel to La flûte à six schtroumpfs (published in English as "The Smurfs and the Magic Flute") and tells how the Smurfs first deliver the flute which was to be the basis of the 1958 story. Johan and Peewit help out a human friend of the Smurfs, but do not actually get to meet the little blue elves themselves.

== Stories and English translations ==
Few of Johan and Peewit's adventures have been published in English: La Flûte à six Schtroumpfs as The Smurfs and the Magic Flute (Hodder and Stoughton UK, 1979, Random House USA, 1983 and Papercutz USA, 2010), La guerre des sept fontaines as The War of the Seven Springs (Papercutz USA, 2013), and La Flèche noire under the title The Black Arrow (Fantasy Flight Publishing USA, 1995).

Below is a list of the French titles, their year of publication, an English translation of the titles and a brief description.

The first 13 albums were published by Dupuis; those that came afterwards were published by Le Lombard.

As well as Spirou magazine, some of the shorter stories, like Sortilèges au château, were published in Risque-Tout (French for "Daredevil") which came from the same publishers.

Johan's adventures published in newspapers prior to his appearing in Spirou are not included.

Title	Date of Publication	English Translation	Writer	Artist
"Le châtiment de Basenhau"	1952	[Basenhau's Punishment]	Peyo	Peyo
During a jousting tournament, Johan, a young pageboy, sees Lord Basenhau tamper with the lance of his undefeated rival, Count Tremaine. Forewarned, the Count defeats, humiliates and exposes Basenhau to the King. Exiled, the fiery lord plots his revenge.
"Le maître de Roucybeuf"	1953	[The Master of Roucybeuf]	Peyo	Peyo
Sir Hughes de Roucybeuf returns to his father's estates to find that much has changed — and not for the better: his father has disappeared; his brother spends his time gambling and drinking; taxes are high; and robbers pillage the area. When masked men try to kill him, Hughes is helped out by a young stranger named Johan, who is determined to change all of this.
"Le lutin du Bois aux Roches"	1954	[The Goblin of Rocky Wood]	Peyo	Peyo
For some time now the wood neighbouring the King's castle has been haunted by what the peasants describe as a goblin called Peewit who plays tricks on people and steals apples, meats and pastries meant for the King. Charged with catching him, Johan discovers that Peewit is in fact a dwarf and suggests that he try to obtain the post of court jester, but then his new friend is accused of kidnapping the King's niece.
"Le dragon vert (Short story)"	1955	[The Green Dragon]	Peyo	Peyo
Johan and Peewit investigate a town terrorised by a dragon.
"Enguerran le preux (Short story)"	1956	[Enguerran the Fearless]	Peyo	Peyo
A proud young knight arrives at the King's castle and Johan and Peewit decide to test out his claims of valour.
"Sortilèges au château (Short story)"	1956	[Spells at the Castle]	Peyo	Peyo
Johan and Peewit return to the castle to find the inhabitants sound asleep in the middle of the day, and nothing can wake them up.
"A l'auberge du pendu (Short story)"	TBA	[At the Hanged Man's Inn]	Peyo	Peyo
An inn is a welcome site for a good meal — except that it is Lent — and a rest — except that it is a hideout for brigands.
"La pierre de lune"	1955	[The Moonstone]	Peyo	Peyo
A wounded man arrives at the castle. He claims to have been attacked by an enemy while delivering a valuable stone to his master. Johan and Peewit take the stone to Homnibus the enchanter, but the enemy, who has some knowledge of magic of his own, is not prepared to give up easily.
"Le serment des Vikings"	1955	[The Vikings' Pledge]	Peyo	Peyo
While traveling along the coast, Johan and Peewit find shelter for the night with a fisherman and his family. The next day a Viking turns up and takes away the fisherman's little son. The two friends intervene, but the Norsemen escape. Then another Viking longship turns up and the hunt resumes across the seas, to the misery of the seasick-prone Peewit. All too soon, however, the two friends are forced to lend their hands in a conspiracy in which the young boy plays a vital role.
"La source des dieux"	1956	[The Source of the Gods]	Peyo	Peyo
On their journey back from the Vikings' lands, Johan and Peewit are shipwrecked and meet a community of serfs made feeble by a witch's curse. For generations a mere walk can make them exhausted, and they are oppressed by a domineering lord and his brutal men. Their only hope is the Source of the Gods from where the water from their river emerges. Setting off on their quest, the pair encounter branching rivers, thick mist and a giant; and that is only the start of their problems.
"Veillée de Noël (Short story)"	1956	[Christmas Eve]	Peyo	Peyo
It may be Christmas Eve, but Peewit cannot wait for the feast to obtain a roast chicken from the kitchen and will use any means necessary to get it.
"La flèche noire"	1957	[The Black Arrow]	Peyo	Peyo
For some time now a group of brigands have been robbing merchants in the area around the King's castle, and all attempts to hunt them down have failed. Sent to a distant town to obtain a golden cup for a tournament, Johan and Peewit come across the outlaws and are forced to join them. From them they learn that there is a traitor in the castle who supplies the bandits with vital information.
"Les mille écus (Short story)"	1957	[The Thousand Écus]	Peyo	Peyo
Peewit's singing becomes too much for Johan and the King, who conspire to send him on a wild treasure hunt.
"Le Sire de Montrésor"	1957	[The Earl of Montrésor]	Peyo	Peyo
When he acquires a falcon called Romulus, Peewit finds that training him is a case of easier said than done, especially when the bird turns out to prefer carrots to rabbits. Then Peewit is seized and dragged off by persons unknown, and the trail leads Johan to the earldom of Montrésor and a complex struggle for power.
"Les anges (Short story)"	1957	[The Angels]	Peyo	Peyo
On a wintry day, Johan and Peewit find refuge in a peasant's cottage where the children take them for angels. Have they the heart to prove them wrong?
"La flûte à six trous"	1958	[The Flute with Six Holes]	Peyo	Peyo
Peewit acquires a flute, which is bad enough for the castle's inhabitants, but this one has the ability of making its audience dance crazily before they collapse from exhaustion. When a thief steals it and uses it to commit further robberies, Johan and Peewit decide to consult the flute's makers: some little blue beings called the Smurfs. Note: subsequent publications changed the title to La flûte à six schtroumpfs ("The Flute with Six Smurfs") and it was the basis of the animated film The Smurfs and the Magic Flute.
"La guerre des sept fontaines"	1959	[The War of the Seven Fountains]	Peyo	Peyo
Peewit's "shortcuts" lead him and Johan to a desolate country and an abandoned castle. There they meet the ghost of the late ruler of the land who explains how a poorly-thought wish dried up the area's source of water and led to a total exodus of the inhabitants. With the help of the Smurfs, Johan and Peewit manage to restore the sources of water but then find that their problems have only just begun, as the ghost's (very) distantly-related descendants begin to fight over possession of the land.
"L’anneau des Castellac"	1960	[The Castellac Ring]	Peyo	Peyo
While staying at an inn, Johan and Peewit meet the Duke of Castellac who has just escaped after being held prisoner by an enemy for three years. He wants to find out why the ransom requested for his release was never paid. That night the Duke is seized by men whom he denounces as traitors; but the next day Johan and Peewit see him in the streets of the town, cheered by the people and accompanied by the same "traitors". So Johan and Peewit must travel into the lion's den to obtain the only evidence of a treacherous scheme.
"Le pays maudit"	1961	[The Cursed Country]	Peyo	Peyo
The King is in a stage of melancholy and nothing appears to cheer him up. In desperation, a travelling entertainer shows off a recent purchase which Johan and Pirlouit recognise as a Smurf! The Smurf explains that his fellow Smurfs are in danger of a "smurf that smurfs smurf". They thus set off on a perilous journey to the land of the Smurfs, which is not helped by having the King in tow.
"Qu’est ce qu’il dit mais qu’est ce qu’il dit ? (Short story)"	1964	[What's He Saying But What's He Saying ?]	Peyo	Peyo
Johan tells Peewit that it is time to control his temper and even gets him to sign a document to that effect. But for how long can Peewit keep it in check?
"Le sortilège de Maltrochu"	1967	[Maltrochu's Spell]	Peyo	Peyo
Peewit comes across a dog which has the ability to speak! He explains that he is actually a human knight who was engaged to a beautiful heiress, only to be turned into a dog by a greedy rival. Breaking the spell proves difficult, and they have to call on the Smurfs for help, but time is of the essence since the rival is making his move on the heiress.
"L’étoile de Noël (Short story)"	1977	[Christmas Star]	Peyo	Peyo
It is Christmas and Peewit is admiring the stars when one of them tells him that someone called Lucas is in trouble. Peewit sets out but a strange man is determined to tempt him out of rescuing Lucas, and what kind of trouble is he in anyway?
"La horde du corbeau"	1994	[The Raven's Horde]	Yvan Delporte	Alain Maury
Angry that no one appreciates his music; Peewit leaves the castle and goes to visit his friend, the young Baron Joel of Fafluth. There he discovers that Joel's steward is plotting against him. Meanwhile Johan gathers together the lords of the kingdom to deal with invading Huns, and the Smurfs are caught in the middle of it all.
"Les troubadours de Roc-à-Pic"	1995	[The Minstrels of Roc-à-Pic]	Yvan Delporte, Thierry Culliford	Alain Maury
Johan and Peewit witness a young knight brilliantly fighting off a group of attackers, but when they go to congratulate him, he denies that the fight ever took place. However, this is just a series of incidents between him and the men, which he keeps denying ever happening.
"La nuit des sorciers"	1998	[The Night of the Sorcerers]	Yvan Delporte	Alain Maury
While visiting their friend Homnibus, Johan and Peewit save a young girl from a mob of peasants who want to burn her as a witch. In fact, she and her mother are witches, who are wanted not just by the mob but also an ambitious enemy who is determined to obtain some objects that will give him unlimited power! Fortunately, Papa Smurf is also on his way to the sorcerers' annual gathering.
"La rose des sables"	2001	[The Rose of the Sands]	Luc Parthoens	Alain Maury
The King recalls how, during the Crusades, he and some other knights were captured by an Emir but secretly freed by his daughter who was tired of the bloodshed. Now, years later, the King learns that the Emir has been captured by brigands and, indebted to the young woman, agrees to pay the ransom. As they make their way to the Holy Land, certain incidents lead Johan to doubt the honesty of a member of the escort.

== Other languages ==
Johan and Peewit appeared in different other languages, of which the ones below with their corresponding names.

- Catalan: Jan i Trencapins
- Danish: Henrik og Hagbart
- Dutch: Johan en Pirrewiet
- Finnish: Johannes ja Pirkale
- German: Johann und Pfiffikus
- Hungarian: Janó és Bibice
- Icelandic: Hinrik og Hagbarður
- Indonesian: Johan dan Pirlouit
- Italian: John e Solfamì
- Portuguese: Johan e Pirlouit
- Spanish: Johan y Pirluit
- Swedish: Johan och Pellevin

== See also ==
- Marcinelle school

== Sources ==
- Johan et Pirlouit publications in Spirou Archived 2007-11-09 at the Wayback Machine BDoubliées (in French)
