= Astrosnik =

Space alien toys

Astrosniks, commonly known as Sniks, are anthropomorphic space aliens created in 1975 by the German company Bullyland to market collectible toys, especially plastic figurines, designed with a retro-futuristic look.

== History ==
Astrosniks were released as several sets of figurines in Germany in the 1970s, and were then licensed to about 50 manufacturers to produce memorabilia in 1983 and 1984. One prominent outlet for Astrosnik figurines during this era was McDonald's, which included them in a long-running Happy Meal promotion. The toys were usually offered as consolation prizes on the game show Starcade.

The Snik figurines were reissued in 1999.

== Books ==
- Astrosniks - El Heroe Snik ISBN 84-02-10138-0
- Astrosniks - SNIK Contra SNIK ISBN 84-02-10139-9
- Astrosniks - El Circo Snik ISBN 84-02-10258-1
- Astrosniks - El Tesoro Snik ISBN 84-02-10312-X
- Astrosniks in Snikville Coloring Book ISBN 0-394-86247-3
- Astrosniks in Space Coloring Book ISBN 0-394-86227-9
- Astrosniks Stamp Fun ISBN 0-394-86606-1
- Junior's Day in Space: An Astrosnik Adventure by Melinda Luke ISBN 0-394-86393-3
- The Quasar Caper: An Astrosnik Adventure by Melinda Luke ISBN 0-394-86392-5
- Bully Reference Book - includes images and descriptions of Sniks characters, alongside other Bully figures produced before 1998

== Audio ==
- Die Sniks: Abenteuer auf einem fremden Stern - Ein Hörspiel von Wolf Orloff - Fontana Records (Cassette: #7252 206 — Vinyl: #6434 337)

== See also ==
- Smurfs
- Snorks
