= Schtroumpf Vert et Vert Schtroumpf =

Ninth album in the series The Smurfs

Smurf Versus Smurf (Schtroumpf vert et vert Schtroumpf)
- Cover of the French edition
- Date: 1973
- Series: The Smurfs
- Page count: 46 pages
- Publisher: Dupuis

Creative team
- Writers: Peyo, Yvan Delporte
- Artists: Peyo

Original publication
- Published in: Spirou magazine
- Date of publication: 1972
- Language: French
- ISBN: 2-8001-0324-8

Translation

Chronology
- Preceded by: Histoires de Schtroumpfs
- Followed by: Smurf Soup

Schtroumpf vert et vert Schtroumpf (published in English as Smurf Versus Smurf) is the ninth comic album adventure in The Smurfs, written and illustrated by Peyo with Yvan Delporte as co-writer. The story is considered a parody on the still ongoing language war between French- and Dutch-speaking communities in the authors' native Belgium. The plot is similar in a way to King Smurf, an earlier adventure, in that the usually harmonious community of Smurfs falls into disarray due to the failure of father-figure Papa Smurf to exercise his leadership.

When released in book form, the French and English versions included a number of one-page stories with the Smurfs undertaking various forms of sport from archery to fishing with comical results.

== Title ==
The title literally means Smurf Green and Green Smurf, as the adjective in French variably could be placed both before and after a noun, also a reference to the Belgian saying chou vert et vert chou, (lit. cabbage green and green cabbage, "two sides of the same coin"), by analogy implying that two things, though presented differently or appearing different, are the same or similar.

== Plot summary ==
From the moment they first appeared in La Flûte à six trous in 1958, it was established that the Smurfs talked in Smurf language, where the term "smurf" was used on an apparently random basis in their discourse: for instance, "It's smurfing a gale today." Now it is revealed that actual differences in the language exist in the otherwise very homogeneous community of Smurfs: the Smurfs who live in the northern part of their village use the term "smurf" as a noun; while the Smurfs in the south use it as an adjective or verb. This difference of opinion is raised when Handy Smurf, a Southern Smurf who is the local inventor, asks a Northern Smurf to return his "smurf opener", but he fails to do so on the grounds that it should be called a "bottle smurfer". Instead of agreeing to disagree, they have an increasingly heated argument about which is the correct term to use.

Papa Smurf is locked away in his laboratory, trying to complete a difficult chemical experiment, which keeps him out of the argument. Meanwhile, other Smurfs start debating the linguistic issue. They part, returning to their own sides of the village, failing to agree on the subject, and as a result there is much tension in the air. One night, during a theatre performance of Little Smurf Riding Hood, the Northern part of the audience keeps interrupting the Southern actors over the use of language, claiming, among other things, that the title should be Little Red Riding Smurf. The arguing and interruptions continue to the point where the play erupts into an all-out fight. Papa Smurf breaks it up, pointing out the silliness of fighting over a matter of words. At first the Smurfs appear to think that he is right, but then start arguing again over whether they should "shake smurfs" or "smurf hands".

The next day, Papa Smurf tries to lift the tension by insisting that they play ball together in a friendly manner. At first it appears to work, but then other Smurfs watching the game begin to divide along lingual lines and the arguments begin again. The tension returns, this time apparently to stay, with insults being traded and both sides trying to assert their indifference and superiority over the other. One Smurf eventually paints a demarcation line across the middle of the village to separate the two groups. This means that they have to stick to their own sides of the border. In one case, a Smurf finds his house marked in two by the straight demarcation line and goes almost crazy since he cannot figure out if he is of the North or the South: for instance, he cooks a "boiled smurf" on one side of his house and eats a "smurfed egg" on the other.

All this time, Papa Smurf has been in his laboratory working on his experiment — the nature of which is never revealed — but when he finally succeeds and calls on the other Smurfs to celebrate, it is already too late: the fuse that was set long ago has exploded with both North and South finally coming to blows in an all-out battle. Papa Smurf's pleas for them to stop are in vain. In a desperate move to restore order, Papa Smurf turns to Gargamel, the evil sorcerer and sworn enemy of the Smurfs. Looking him in the eye, Papa Smurf pronounces a magic spell that immediately causes him and Gargamel to exchange their physical appearances: Gargamel becomes Papa Smurf and Papa Smurf becomes Gargamel. Gargamel's cat Azrael is taken aback when he hears the voice of his master coming from Papa Smurf's body and goes his own way, overwhelmed by confusion.

Papa Smurf (as Gargamel) and Gargamel (as Papa Smurf) return to the Smurf village together where the battle is still ongoing. However, upon seeing Gargamel attack, the Smurfs on both sides reunite to fight against their common archenemy. Papa Smurf (as Gargamel) allows himself to be subdued and tied down. He hoped to teach them a lesson in being united ("smurf for all and all for smurf"), but they mock his claim to actually be Papa Smurf and refuse to release him. The real Gargamel, in Papa Smurf's body, breaks into the laboratory and finds the magic spell. He thus restores himself and Papa Smurf into their original bodies, freed from the bonds. Gargamel immediately takes the opportunity to chase and seize the Smurfs throughout the village and further into the woods. But then he and the Smurfs come across Azrael who attacks him, thinking that it's still Papa Smurf in Gargamel's body.

All the Smurfs successfully escape from Gargamel's hands, while Gargamel (as usual) fails to find his way back to their village. At first it would seem as if peace has returned but then Papa Smurf overhears another argument about whether it should be a "smurf opener" or a "bottle smurfer". To prevent further clashes, he decrees that all the terms pronounced differently on the north and south sides of the village are now banned from use, so it should henceforth be "an object to unscrew bottles". However, the Smurfs find it very difficult to use this new politically correct language, since very complicated and descriptive forms of expression are now needed and are subject to different interpretations, meaning that the resolution of the linguistic issue is still a long way off, and that the dialectal differences still persist.

== Publication history ==
Smurf vs. Smurf was originally published in issues 1908 to 1936 of Spirou magazine in 1972 and then in book form by Dupuis in 1973. As well as the original French, other translations include English (as Smurf Of One And Smurf A Dozen Of The Other), Dutch, German, Swedish, Spanish, Italian, Danish, Serbo-Croatian, Polish, Catalan and Chinese.

== See also ==
- Characters in The Smurfs
