= Smurfin!: Tenth Anniversary Commemorative Album =

Studio album by The Smurfs
- Released: 1989
- Recorded: Recorded and Mixed at S.B. Studios, the Netherlands
- Genre: Pop rock
- Length: CD/Cassette: 59:23; LP: 1:12:23
- Label: I.M.P.S.
- Producer: Cees Jansen & Sander Bos

In 1989, I.M.P.S and R-Tek Music, International released Smurfin! Tenth Anniversary Commemorative Album, a collection of 1960s and 1980s pop songs covered by the Smurfs. Created by Peyo, The Smurfs were a hit in North America, releasing several albums including a Christmas album.

Smurfin! was recorded at the S.B. Studios in Huizen, the Netherlands. It was produced by Cees Jansen and Sander Bos and was arranged by Cor Willems. It was released on CD, cassette and 2-record LP by Quality Special Products in Canada and the US, and Dino Music in Australia. It was also released in New Zealand and some parts of Europe.

Although there were 20 tracks recorded, not all tracks were used on each "Edition" of the album. Some of the Smurfin! CDs used between 10 and 20 of the 20 tracks recorded: The Australian CD, cassette and LP versions all contained the same 16 tracks, while the US CD release contained all 20 tracks.

The Canadian and American cassettes were released in two versions: one version contained 16 tracks, while the other was split into two albums, each with 10 songs. One Album was blue, with the main cover photo, and the other was white, also with the main cover photo. The Australian cassette was not split into two albums, but it did use different artwork than the Canadian/American release. It used the back cover image with track titles overlaid and the banner from the normal front cover. Australian and Canadian releases of the CD and cassette were identical.

The US, Canadian and Australian LPs consisted of all 20 tracks over 2 vinyl records.

The four tracks usually left off the CD/cassette were: The Lion Sleeps Tonight, Simon Says, I Should Be So Lucky and Especially for You. They were not on the Australian CD release or Canadian cassette release. They were on the US LP release, and I Should be so Lucky was on the American cassette while Especially for You was on the American CD.

Kylie Minogue has the most songs covered with three: The Locomotion, I Should Be So Lucky and Especially for You. The Beach Boys have two songs covered: Surfin' U.S.A. and Kokomo. All the rest of the original artists have only one song covered.

== Track listing (For CD and cassette) ==
Track (Can/AUS, CD & Cassette)	Track (USA, CD)	Track (USA, Cassette [White])	Track (USA, Cassette [Blue])	Title	Length	Cover of	Description
1	4	N/A	4	"Smurfin! USA"	2:29	"Surfin' U.S.A." by The Beach Boys	All about surfing across the USA. The word "Surfing" is changed to "Smurfing."
2	9	N/A	9	"Kokomo"	3:39	"Kokomo" by The Beach Boys	About taking your woman down to the Caribbean.
3	N/A	8	N/A	"Walking on Sunshine"	3:35	"Walking on Sunshine" by Katrina and the Waves	A woman awaits a letter from her love who is far away.
4	N/A	5	N/A	"Simply Irresistible"	4:13	"Simply Irresistible" by Robert Palmer	Song describing an irresistible woman.
5	7	N/A	7	"Don't Worry Be Happy"	3:57	Don't Worry Be Happy by Bobby McFerrin	Detailing the many ways of being happy. The lyric "Ain't got no place to lay your head/Somebody came and took your bed" was changed to "Ain't got no place to lay your hat/Somebody came and took your bat"
6	N/A	9	N/A	"Twist & Shout"	3:38	Twist & Shout by Salt 'N' Pepa	Telling a girl how well she dances. Uses "cleaner" lyrics than the original song.
7	3	N/A	3	"Gargamel and the Smurfs"	4:32	An original song?	Gargamel describes what he would do if he were to capture a Smurf. The Smurfs describe what they do when they see Gargamel coming. Sung by Gargamel and the Smurfs.
8	10	N/A	10	"Smurf Town"	4:12	An original song?	The Smurfs sing about what life is like in their Smurf Village.
9	N/A	1	N/A	"I Think We're Alone Now"	3:43	I Think We're Alone Now by Tiffany	Describes two people, who are in love, and have to hide it from everyone.
10	N/A	2	N/A	"The Locomotion"	3:17	The Locomotion by Kylie Minogue	Sings directions on how to do a dance called "The Locomotion."
11	N/A	6	N/A	"Get Outta my Dreams, Get Into my Car"	4:40	Get Outta My Dreams, Get into My Car by Billy Ocean	The singer longs for a girl to get out of his head and into his car.
12	N/A	7	N/A	"You Keep Me Hangin' On"	3:41	You Keep Me Hangin' On by Kim Wilde	The singer's friend uses and abuses her, making her think that they are still a couple.
13	5	N/A	5	"La Bamba"	2:41	La Bamba by Los Lobos	A traditional song sung in Spanish.
14	8	N/A	8	"Walk Like an Egyptian"	3:22	Walk Like an Egyptian by The Bangles	About dancing like pictures of Egyptians in ancient hieroglyphs on tomb walls.
15	N/A	4	N/A	"Whenever You Need Somebody"	3:29	Whenever You Need Somebody by Rick Astley	The singer tells a friend that he'll be there for her any time.
16	1	N/A	1	"Nothing's Gonna Change my Love for You"	4:16	Nothing's Gonna Change My Love for You by Glen Medeiros	A man states that he'll love her girl no matter what.
N/A	N/A	3	N/A	"I Should Be So Lucky"	3:22	I Should Be So Lucky by Kylie Minogue	The singer wishes she was as lucky as another in the ways of love.
N/A	N/A	10	N/A	"Simon Says"	2:34	Simon Says by 1910 Fruitgum Company	Singing about playing a game of "Simon Says".
N/A	2	N/A	2	"Especially for You"	3:59	Especially for You by Kylie Minogue and Jason Donovan	Two people explain why they are in love.
N/A	6	N/A	6	"The Lion Sleeps Tonight"	2:45	The Lion Sleeps Tonight by The Nylons or The Tokens	All about a lion sleeping in a jungle.

(N/A:)These tracks did not appear on this version of the album.

== Track listing for US LP ==
The record album had two LPs and four sides. Each side contained five songs, in a different order than the CD/cassettes.

=== Record One/Side One ===
- I Think We're Alone Now
- The Locomotion
- I Should Be So Lucky
- Whenever You Need Somebody
- Simply Irresistible

=== Record One/Side Two ===
- Get Outta My Dreams, Get Into My Car
- You Keep Me Hanging On
- Walking On Sunshine
- Twist and Shout
- Simon Says

=== Record Two/Side One ===
- Nothing's Gonna Change my Love For You
- Especially for You
- Gargamel and the Smurfs
- Smurfin' USA
- La Bamba

=== Record Two/Side Two ===
- The Lion Sleeps Tonight
- Don't Worry Be Happy
- Walk Like an Egyptian
- Kokomo
- Smurf Town
