= The Smurfs and the Magic Flute =

- Theatrical release poster
- Directed by: José Dutillieu
- Screenplay by: Peyo
- Story by: Peyo; Yvan Delporte
- Based on: The Smurfs by Peyo
- Produced by: Charles Dupuis; Raymond Leblanc
- Starring: See cast below
- Cinematography: François Léonard
- Edited by: Nebiha Ben Milad; Michèle Neny
- Music by: Michel Legrand; Yvan Delporte and Peyo (songs)
- Production companies: Éditions Dupuis; Belvision Studios; Lafig, S.A. Imps, S.A.
- Distributed by: Mercury Films
- Release date: 24 December 1975 (Belgium)
- Running time: 74 minutes
- Country: Belgium
- Language: French
- Box office: $19 million

The Smurfs and the Magic Flute (French: La Flûte à six schtroumpfs, lit. The Flute of Six Smurfs) is a 1975 Belgian fantasy comedy animated film, starring the Smurfs. The film was directed by their creator, Peyo. Although the film premiered in 1975 in Belgium and Switzerland, it was not released in the United Kingdom until 1979, and in the United States until 1983, in the wake of the characters' newfound popularity.

The film is based on the 1958 comic book of the same name, originally a part of the Johan and Peewit series (created by Peyo in 1952), and notable as the first appearance of the Smurfs in media. Accordingly, although the Smurfs play a major part, they do not appear until 35 minutes into the film.

The film was not produced by Hanna-Barbera, the creators of The Smurfs television series, but by Brussels' Belvision Studios and Éditions Dupuis. The voice talent from that show was not present in either English version. Instead, the work was handled by a non-union crew whose members had previously appeared in anime dubs for American television for the American dub, while a non-union British crew was used for the British English dub.

A presentation of independent film company Atlantic Releasing in the United States, The Smurfs and the Magic Flute grossed over US$19 million. The film's success led to the creation of Clubhouse Pictures, Atlantic's children's film division.

== Plot ==
The film is set at a castle during the Middle Ages. One day a merchant brings musical instruments to sell to Peewit, the court jester, but because Peewit is such a terrible musician, the King throws the merchant out before Peewit arrives. However, he has left behind a flute that has only six holes. The King throws it into the fireplace in his room, which starts to emit green smoke. When the fire is put out, Peewit retrieves the flute from the ashes unharmed. He cleans it and starts playing it for the whole castle, realizing that it causes everyone to dance when it is played. Also he learns that if one dances to this flute for too long, they pass out of exhaustion.

That night a man named Matthew McCreep learns from the merchant that the same flute he had been looking for is at the castle. He heads over to the castle and steals the flute from Peewit. The king sends Peewit and the young knight Johan out to catch McCreep, who uses the flute to rob people of their money. However, McCreep uses the flute to stop them. Johan and Peewit then go to the house of Homnibus the wizard. Using the Hypnokinesis spell, the wizard sends Johan and Peewit to Smurfland where the magic flute was built.

Upon arriving, they meet a Smurf who leads them to the village. Papa Smurf greets the two of them and tells them that they will make a new flute in order to counter McCreep's flute. The Smurfs head into the forest and chop down a huge tree to get wood from the tree trunk's very centre as only this kind of wood can be useful in crafting a magical flute. Afterwards, they celebrate with a party. However, just as Papa Smurf is about to give the flute to Johan and Peewit, the two are warped back to the wizard's house. Homnibus tries the spell again but passes out from a headache.

Meanwhile, McCreep, who has now stolen over 7,000 gold pieces, arrives at the castle of his secret partner, Earl Flatbroke. McCreep tells Flatbroke of his plan to go to an island to hire people for an army to raise war on the King's castle; two Smurfs had been listening to this. Back at the wizard's house, the Smurfs regroup with Johan and Peewit and give them the magic flute. Then they head to the port of Terminac where McCreep sets sail for the island. However, they are too late. Papa Smurf tells Johan and Peewit about Flatbroke's castle and Johan comes up with a plan.

Flatbroke receives a letter from McCreep (written by Johan) to come to the island. He heads over to Terminac to board a ship where Johan and Peewit are also on board in disguise as well as Papa Smurf and three others (Brainy being one of them). They head to the island where Johan and Peewit tail Flatbroke. Suddenly, Peewit comes face to face with McCreep and they both start playing their flutes to each other. They both become exhausted soon after, but Peewit knocks out McCreep with a final note.

With McCreep and Flatbroke being brought back to the castle and all the stolen money recovered, Peewit now has two magic flutes. Johan tells him that the flutes are dangerous and must be brought back to the Smurfs, but Peewit begins to carve a phony flute to give to them instead. At the castle, Johan and Peewit give the flutes back to the Smurfs, and after they leave, Peewit starts playing the flute, only to realize (to his horror) that it has no effect on the townsfolk; it is rather the fake flute he had made, much to his frustration.

== Voice cast ==
| Character | Original | UK English | US English |
|---|---|---|---|
| Senechal/Chancellor/Lord Miller | Georges Atlas | Unknown | Star X. Phifer |
| Drinker | Jacques Balutin | Unknown | Unknown |
| Merchant | Angelo Bardi | Richard Ashley | Star X. Phifer |
| Visitor | Jacques Ciron | Unknown | Unknown |
| Johan/John/Yohan | William Coryn | Vernon Morris | Grant Gottschall |
| Homnibus | Henri Crémieux | Harry Dickman | Ted Lehman |
| Smurf #2/Southy | Roger Crouzet | Unknown | Michael Sorich |
| Mortaille/Mumford/Earl Flatbroke | Jacques Dynam | Unknown | Ron Gans |
| Papa Smurf | Michel Elias | Bill Owen | Bill Capizzi (1st version); Michael Sorich (2nd version) |
| Grouchy Smurf | Michel Elias | Unknown | John Rust |
| Dame Barde/Lady Gripe/Lady Prattle | Ginette Garcin | Unknown | Patty Foley |
| Fisherman | Henri Labussière | Unknown | Robert Axelrod |
| Torchesac/Matthew Oily-Creep/Matthew "Oily" McCreep | Albert Médina | Unknown | Mike Reynolds |
| Pirlouit/William/Peewit | Michel Modo | Stuart Lock | Cameron Clarke |
| The King | Georges Pradez | Unknown | Dudley Knight |
| Guard | Serge Nadaud | Unknown | Michael Sorich |
| Deaf Person | Serge Nadaud | Unknown | Robert Axelrod |
| Oliver | Serge Nadaud | Unknown | Patty Foley |
| Silvermonger | Serge Nadaud | Unknown | Unknown |
| Smurf #1/Schemer | Jacques Ruisseau | Unknown | Robert Axelrod |
| Brainy Smurf | Jacques Marin | Unknown | Star X. Phifer |

=== Additional voices ===
- Original: Jacques Balutin, Angelo Bardi, Jacques Marin
- UK: Ed Devereaux, Bill Owen, Harry Dickman, Richard Pescud, Vernon Morris, Stuart Lock, Yael O'Dwyer, Anna MacLeod, Richard Ashley, Paul Felber, Michael Fields, Kalman Glass
- US: Patty Foley, Bill Capizzi, Star X. Phifer, Dudley Knight, John Rust, Richard Miller, David Page, Durga McBroom, Michael Sorich, Robert Axelrod

== Inspiration ==
The film is based on La Flûte à six trous ("The Flute with Six Holes"), which appeared in the Belgian weekly comic Spirou magazine in 1958/59. Subsequent book publications renamed it as La Flûte à six Schtroumpfs ("The Flute of Six Smurfs"), which was also the French title of the film.

In 2008, a prequel Les Schtroumpfeurs de flûte ("The Flute Smurfers") was published, marking the 50th anniversary of the original story to introduce the Smurfs. This story tells of how the Smurfs make the magic flute and how it ends up in the hands of a human merchant.

== Production and release ==
Peyo, the creator of the Smurfs, oversaw the production of La Flûte à six schtroumpfs at Brussels' Belvision in 1975. The film was based on Peyo's comic album of the same name, the ninth to feature his duo of characters, Johan and Peewit. The music score was written by Michel Legrand, a recent Oscar winner for Summer of '42 and the original Thomas Crown Affair. It was released a year later in its native Belgium, and in some European territories subsequently. A book adaptation of the film, by Anthea Bell, was published in Great Britain by Hodder and Stoughton in 1979 (ISBN 0-340-24068-7).

The film was first dubbed and released in English in the United Kingdom by Target International and Roehall Pictures in 1979, but it was not until the success of Hanna-Barbera's The Smurfs cartoon that Flute began to gain widespread attention: in the early 1980s, Stuart R. Ross, head of First Performance Pictures Corporation, and also the North American rightsholder to the Smurfs characters themselves, acquired the American rights to the film for US$1,000,000. In doing so, he sold those rights to Tribune Entertainment (television), Vestron Video (home video), and Atlantic Releasing (theatrical).

The American English dubbing for the film was not provided by the Hanna-Barbera cast members, but by non-union talent who were contributing at the time to American versions of imported anime. John Rust, the director of this dub, appeared as one of the voices.

The North American release of Flute, courtesy of Ross' First Performance and Atlantic, despite not doing well critically grossed US$11 million out of a maximum 432 venues, the highest on record for a non-Disney production until The Care Bears Movie in 1985, and was among Atlantic's all-time top five movies at the box office. Thanks to its success, Atlantic released several more animated features, many of which were distributed by their short-lived children's subsidiary, Clubhouse Pictures.

The theatrical poster for the film boasted, "It's the Smurfs' ONE and ONLY full-length motion picture...ever!" Prior to Flute, however, a black-and-white compilation feature, Les Aventures des Schtroumpfs, was released in Belgium in the mid-1960s, and had been forgotten by the time this film debuted in the UK in 1979 and the US in 1983.

The film features Papa Smurf, Brainy Smurf, Grouchy Smurf, Hefty Smurf (named "Strong-man Smurf" in the British dub) Handy Smurf, Clumsy Smurf, Greedy Smurf (named "Sweetie" in the American dub), Poet Smurf, Farmer Smurf, and a new character, Festive Smurf ("Actor Smurf" in the American dub) – who loved to sing and dance and whose priority was wanting to have a party.

However, unlike the Hanna-Barbera cartoons, all the Smurfs (with the exception of Papa Smurf, Grouchy Smurf, and Brainy Smurf) look alike and do not have their trademark attributes, just like in the original comics. The humor is also closer to the one from the comics. Rather than being symbolically thrown away, Brainy Smurf is constantly being whacked with a hammer by the other Smurfs simply for talking too much.

As their characters weren't yet introduced when the story the film is based on was published, the characters of Gargamel, Azrael and Smurfette are not present in the film.

The British dub is different from the American version. Many of the names are changed (for example, Johan and Peewit's names become John and William, respectively), and several Smurfs are called by different names. The British dub also gives The Smurfs almost the exact same voice (with the exceptions of a few of them like Papa Smurf and Grumpy Smurf), unlike the American dub which gives The Smurfs more distinctive voices from one another.

There are two dubs of the movie in the United States, in one of which Johan is referred to as John, much like the British dub, and Papa Smurf has a higher pitched voice; this dub is only available on VHS in the United States. The version broadcast on television has Johan's name restored with all lines mentioning his name redubbed, and Papa Smurf has a completely different voice. Due to the different voice cast than the TV series, some of the characters either sound partly or completely different than in the series, and Peewit's name stayed intact in all American dubs.

The film was originally released on VHS and laserdisc in February 1984 by the aforementioned Vestron Video. In 1987, Children's Video Library released the film in a 43-minute cut, excising over half an hour of material, reissued later in the decade by the discount Video Treasures and Avid Home Entertainment labels.

Tribune Entertainment Company, then a syndicator, picked up the syndicated rights of the film for a barter basis as a special.

In 2008, Televista released the movie on DVD, which carried a hybrid of the first and second American dubs. Johan is referred to as John for the first portion of the film, and as Johan once they meet the Smurfs. MorningStar Entertainment also had plans for a DVD release that same year, but they scrapped it for unknown reasons. In 2010, a remastered edition of the British dub was released on DVD and Blu-ray in the UK by Arrow Films and Fabulous Films and in 2012, the two companies partnered with Shout! Factory for a Region 1 DVD release in North America. Due to Arrow Films' ownership of the movie, the American dub has not been released on any platform since Televista's DVD.

== Reception ==
Of The Smurfs and the Magic Flute, animation historian Jerry Beck wrote in his Animated Movie Guide:

Is the film any good? It is passable entertainment for Smurfs completists only. Otherwise, mom and dad will have a tough time sitting through this one. There are no standout sequences, nothing particularly endearing, nor is it artistically interesting. It is a bland television cartoon stretched out to fill 74 minutes. As part of 1980s pop culture, the Smurfs are classic icons, and nostalgia value alone might be worth giving the film a look.

The film was a big hit at the box office, the highest on record for a non-Disney animated production at the time and was among Atlantic's all-time box office blockbusters.

== See also ==
- Lists of animated films

== Bibliography ==
- Beck, Jerry (2005). The Animated Movie Guide. ISBN 1556525915. Chicago Reader Press. Retrieved 5 April 2007.
