= The Smurfs Dance Party =

2011 video game

- North American box art
- Developer: Land Ho!
- Publisher: Ubisoft
- Composers: Tom Zehnder, Drew Ryan Scott, Mike Eagle, Lily Howard, Justin Bowler, Gigi Abraham, Walmes Steeges, Patricia Krebs, Brian Ibarra, David Lee Brandt
- Series: The Smurfs, Just Dance
- Platform: Wii
- Release: NA: July 19, 2011; EU: July 29, 2011; AU: September 8, 2011
- Genres: Music, rhythm, dance
- Modes: Single-player, multiplayer

The Smurfs Dance Party is a dance rhythm game developed by Japanese studio Land Ho! and published by Ubisoft for the Wii as a spin-off title to the Just Dance Kids series. The game was released on July 19, 2011, in North America, July 29, 2011, in Europe and September 8, 2011, in Australia.

== Gameplay ==
The gameplay is similar to the dance franchise Just Dance. The Smurfs Dance Party allows players to dance alongside Papa Smurf, Clumsy Smurf, Brainy Smurf, Grouchy Smurf, Gutsy Smurf, Smurfette and Gargamel. The game also includes a Story Mode, which is based on the events of the film, The Smurfs, and features eight songs.

== Track list ==
The track list consists of 25 songs.

Song	Artist	Year
"Smurfberry-licious"	Tom Zehnder	2011
"Go Go Go Get It"	Drew Ryan Scott	2011
"More Than a Name"	Drew Ryan Scott	2011
"Very Blue Moon"	Tom Zehnder	2011
"Gargamel"	Mike Eagle and Tom Zehnder	2011
"We Have Us"	Drew Ryan Scott, Lily Howard, and Tom Zehnder	2011
"Everybody Up"	Lily Howard	2011
"Welcome to New York"	Mike Eagle and Tom Zehnder	2011
"Mr. Smurftastic"	Justin Bowler	1996
"Living Color"	Gigi Abraham	2011
"Like Whoa"	Aly and AJ (covered by Gigi Abraham)	2007
"Blame It on the Boogie"	Mick Jackson (covered by Patricia Krebs)	1978
"The Noisy Smurf"	Walmes Steeges	1996
"Smurfs (Main Title)"	The Smurfs (covered by Patricia Krebs)	1981
"I Wanna Dance with Somebody (Who Loves Me)"	Whitney Houston (covered by Patricia Krebs)	1987
"We Like to Smurf It"	Reel 2 Real feat. The Mad Stuntman (covered by Justin Bowler)	1993
"A Year Without Rain"	Selena Gomez & the Scene (covered by Gigi Abraham)	2010
"Walking on Sunshine"	Katrina and the Waves (covered by Gigi Abraham)	1985
"Who Let the Smurfs Out?"	Baha Men (covered by Tom Zehnder and Brian Ibarra)	2000
"Boom Shack-A-Lak"	Apache Indian (covered by Justin Bowler)	1993
"Barbara Streisand"	Duck Sauce (covered by Tom Zehnder)	2010
"Just the Way You Are"	Bruno Mars (covered by Drew Ryan Scott)	2010
"Smurf This Way"	Drew Ryan Scott and Tom Zehnder	1975
"Higher"	Taio Cruz feat. Kylie Minogue (covered by Drew Ryan Scott and David Lee Brandt)	2011
"One of the Boys"	Katy Perry	2008

== Reception ==
The Smurfs Dance Party received an overall score of 3.0/10 from Gameplay Today, stating "The Smurfs Dance Party had the makings of a sleeper hit for the simple fact that it was a dance game being made by the people who brought us Just Dance and Just Dance 2. The lineage means nothing here though because this game couldn't be further from its successful "smurfless" cousins."
