= Les Aventures des Schtroumpfs =

- Film screenshot
- Directed by: Eddy Ryssack; Maurice Rosy
- Written by: Yvan Delporte; Peyo; André Franquin
- Based on: The Smurfs by Peyo
- Produced by: Charles Dupuis
- Starring: Jacques Courtois; Marion; Nelly Béghin; Richard Muller; Jeannine Cherel; Paul Roland
- Cinematography: Raoul Cauvin; Norbert Declercq
- Music by: Roland Renerte
- Animation by: Charles Degotte
- Release date: 1965
- Running time: 90 minutes
- Country: Belgium
- Language: French

Les Aventures des Schtroumpfs (lit. The Adventures of the Smurfs) is a 1965 animated compilation film based on the Belgian comic book series The Smurfs. It was the first animated feature film featuring the Smurf characters. The film was released in 1965 in Belgium. The Belvision film The Smurfs and the Magic Flute was released eleven years afterwards to successful box office returns.

== Plot ==
The film consists of five black-and-white shorts made in the previous years for broadcast on Walloon TV:

=== Le Voleur de Schtroumpfs ===
Gargamel captures a Smurf to create the Philosopher’s Stone, and Brainy Smurf rushes back to complain to Papa Smurf. The Smurfs then launch a series of rescue attempts. After outsmarting Gargamel, they free their friend, and when Gargamel tries to become a giant for revenge, a potion swap shrinks him instead, leading to Azrael swallowing him whole.

=== L'Œuf et les Schtroumpfs ===
A Smurf finds a magical egg in the forest, and despite Papa Smurf's warning, the others try to break it. When a Smurf strikes it with an axe and wishes to become a hot-dog, he is transformed. The egg grants wishes, leading to chaos as Smurfs make selfish wishes. One prank turns Papa Smurf into a regular Smurf, but he restores order with a wish. The egg then cracks open, revealing a baby chick, and one Smurf attempts to chase a rooster, only to be scared off by its size.

=== Les Schtroumpfs noirs ===
Brainy and another Smurf are working in the forest when a Bzz Fly stings the other Smurf, turning him black and making him insane. The infection spreads as more Smurfs are bitten. Brainy complains to Papa Smurf, which leads him to attempt various cures, but they all fail. Eventually, Papa Smurf discovers that tuberose pollen is the antidote. The leader of the Black Smurfs disguises himself as blue to avoid the cure, but an explosion spreads the pollen, curing all the Black Smurfs. Throughout the ordeal, Brainy helps Papa Smurf by assisting in the search for a solution and testing the antidote. Papa Smurf and the Smurfs celebrate their victory.

=== Le Schtroumpf et son dragon ===
A Smurf discovers a dragon in the forest and brings it back to Smurf Village, causing panic among the other Smurfs.

=== Le Schtroumpf volant ===
A Smurf desperately wants to fly and tries various methods to defy gravity, including attaching feathers to his arms, building a kite, and enchanting a broomstick.

== See also ==
- List of animated feature-length films
- The Smurfs
