= The Smurfs (video game) =

2011 video game

- Developer: Ubisoft Osaka
- Publisher: Ubisoft
- Platform: Nintendo DS
- Release: NA: July 19, 2011; EU: July 29, 2011; AU: September 9, 2011
- Genre: Party
- Mode: Single-player

The Smurfs is a video game published by Ubisoft exclusively for the Nintendo DS, coinciding with the release of the movie of the same name.

A sequel titled The Smurfs 2 was released in 2013 for the Nintendo DS, along with other platforms.

== Gameplay ==
The Smurfs lets players play a series of educational mini-games and read-along stories about the Smurfs. Players will help the Smurfs prepare for the Blue Moon festival in their village, some activities included are decorating cakes, composing a symphony and picking out an outfit for Smurfette. But, the evil wizard Gargamel is waiting to disrupt the party.

== Characters ==
- Papa Smurf
- Baker Smurf
- Clumsy Smurf
- Smurfette
- Gargamel
