= The Smurfs merchandising =

Merchandising centered around the Smurfs

The Smurfs is a Belgian comic book series created by Peyo in 1958. It became well-known worldwide with the Hanna-Barbera cartoon series in the 1980s. With the popularity of the Smurfs came a wide range of toys and spin-off products and use of the Smurfs in merchandising. In 2020, ViacomCBS (later renamed Paramount Global in 2022) partnered with LAFIG Belgium and IMPS (the worldwide licensors for The Smurfs) to manage licensing rights to the Smurfs in several territories, as part of a deal that will also see the company's Nickelodeon channel air the IMPS-produced animated Smurfs series.

== Figurines ==
Dupuis, editor of the Smurf comics, first produced smurf figurines in 1959. The first one was a series of three figurines, 5 centimetres (about 2 inches) tall, of Papa Smurf, Normal and Angry, followed in the next decade by some larger figurines. Those were only for sale in French- and Dutch-speaking countries. In 1965, Schleich, a German company, made the first truly mass-produced PVC Smurf collectible figurines (the first three being Normal Smurf, Gold Smurf and Convict Smurf (complete with black-and-white striped prisoner's outfit). In 1966, Spy Smurf, Angry Smurf, and Drummer Smurf appeared. In 1969, five more smurfs followed: Moon Smurf, Winter Smurf, Brainy Smurf, Guitar Smurf, and Papa Smurf. In the 1970s, smurfs were also produced by rival German company Bully. The first of these figurines were made as a promotion for Kellogg's, but were afterwards sold separately.

For a while advertisers used Smurfs to promote Renault, National Benzole and BP garages and—in the United Kingdom, South Africa, Australia, and New Zealand at least—the figurines were given away when petrol (gasoline) was purchased.

A scare story that claimed Smurf figurines used leaded paint circulated in Britain in the 1970s, leading Jonathan King to release a single, "Lick a Smurp for Christmas (All Fall Down)" under the name of Father Abraphart and the Smurps. This was a parody of "The Smurf Song" by Father Abraham and the Smurfs, a worldwide hit single. The lead paint scare was brought about by a group of people in the marketing department of National Benzole who decided to outsource some smurf figurines to be made in Hong Kong instead of Europe, just four or five different lines. It was later discovered that these had been produced without adhering to the necessary quality standards so they were deemed possibly unsafe. Paint dots were then introduced on the feet of PVC figurines so that they could identify the ones with paint dots as having passed quality control tests and they were also given different colours according to the different countries they were produced in. An article in The Times dated 4 October 1978 said that tests by the Department of Health showed there was no significant risk, so National Benzole then resumed sales of smurf figures from garage forecourts within the UK.

Many people do not realise that the Smurf figurines actually still continue in production today. The popularity of the smurfs in countries such as Belgium and Germany has never waned, and Smurf collecting has become a growing hobby worldwide, with 400 different figures produced so far. New Smurf figures continue to appear: in fact, only in two years since 1969 (1991 and 1998) have no new smurfs entered the market. Schleich produced 8 new figurines a year until December of 2025. Over 300 million of them have been sold so far.

A Smurf Christmas ornament was released by Hallmark Cards as part of their 2012 Keepsake Collection featuring a Smurf holding a Toadstool umbrella.

== Music recordings ==
Over the decades, many singles and albums of Smurf music have been released in different countries and languages, sometimes very successfully, with millions of copies sold. The best known is the single The Smurf Song and its accompanying album, created by Dutch musician Pierre Kartner who sings under the alias Father Abraham, which reached the #1 position in 16 countries. Worldwide, more than 10 million CDs with Smurf music have been sold between 2005 and 2007 alone.

== Smurfs on ice ==
For several years, the Smurfs were the children's act in the Ice Capades travelling ice show; for many years after they were retired from that function, the smurf suits from the show were issued to Ice Capades Chalets, the show's subsidiary chain of ice rinks, lasting until the show was sold to a group of investors led by Dorothy Hamill, and the Chalets were sold to Recreation World. The Smurfette suit in particular had a somewhat different hairstyle from what was portrayed in the Hanna-Barbera cartoons.

== Smurfs in theme parks ==
In 1984, the Smurfs began appearing in North American theme parks owned by Kings Entertainment Corporation. Each park featured a Smurfy attraction and Smurf walk-around figures. (This collection of parks was formerly owned by H-B's one-time parent Taft Broadcasting, were sold to Paramount Pictures in the early 1990s, later falling under ownership of Viacom and, for a short time, CBS Corporation, and now owned by the Cedar Fair Entertainment Company.)

Kings Island At Kings Island near Cincinnati, Ohio, "The Smurfs' Enchanted Voyage" opened in 1984. It was similar to Disney's "It's A Small World". People would ride in a boat around the world of the Smurfs celebrating the seasons of winter, autumn, summer and spring. It was removed during the 1991 season. The interactive dark ride "Boo Blasters on Boo Hill" takes place in 2010.

Kings Dominion The earlier "Land of the Dooz" mine train attraction became "Smurf Mountain". In 1995, it was eventually closed to make room for the popular "Volcano: The Blast Coaster" opened in 1998.

California's Great America Opening in 1987, Smurf Woods featured a pint-sized steel coaster, "The Blue Streak" (now called "Woodstock's Express"), as well as a Smurf village with mushroom houses. Smurf Woods was closed in the early 1990s and replaced with Nickelodeon Central. One Smurf house survived and can be seen in the Picnic Grove area.

Carowinds In 1984, Carowinds added Smurf Island, which was a children’s play area located on the 1.3-acre (5,300 m^{2}) island surrounded by the Carolina Sternwheeler. Access to Smurf Island was gained in one of two ways – across the Carolina Sternwheeler and a ramp built on the island side of the boat, or on diesel-powered “Smurf Boats” launched from the area beside Harmony Hall. Children could enjoy two ball crawls and a climbing area complete with ropes, cargo nets, wood platforms, a rope tunnel and a 60-foot (18 m) tubular slide. Smurf characters roamed the island and led guests to the hidden Smurf village with four Smurf houses that children could enter. Smurf Island was eventually closed, and later demolished to make space for the "Borg Assimilator", a Star Trek themed flying roller coaster, opened in 2004. In 2008, the park renamed several attractions including "Borg Assimilator". It was renamed to "Nighthawk" and the Star Trek theming was removed.

Canada's Wonderland At Canada's Wonderland near Toronto, Smurf Forest opened in 1984. It featured "Smurf Village", a walk-through attraction which portrayed life in the titular setting, as well as Gargamel's house. The Gargamel section frightened children so much that the park had to eventually open the emergency exit for families who wished to bypass it. Smurf Village was originally "Yogi's Forest" when the park opened in 1981. It also had an out-door theater in which live children's shows were held, and "Lazy's Snail Trail," a ride in which you sat in buggies being pulled by snails with a Smurf on the back of each buggy. Typical midway and carnival games were also featured attractions, but modified to fit the Smurf theme. Smurf Forest closed in 1993.

Hanna–Barbera Land Hanna-Barbera Land located in Spring, Texas, which opened in 1984 and 1985, had a Smurf district.

In Europe, various parks have been adapting the theme of the Smurfs since 1989:

Walygator Parc For almost thirteen years, from 1989 to 2002, the Smurfs were the mascots of a theme park located in France. First designed within the extant halls of Sacilor's Laminoir by the Leisure division HHCP Architects in Maitland, Florida, the theme park was named "The New World of the Smurfs", or "Le Nouveau Monde des Schtroumpfs". After a decision was made to abandon the mill, the park was re-designed by Grady Larkins and eventually opened up on May 9, 1989. It was first called "Big Bang Smurf", then "Walibi Schtroumpf". In 1998, the park is taken over by Premier Parks. It become "Walibi Lorraine" in 2003 and doesn't renew the license for the Smurfs. The Smurfs characters are removed from the park. In 2004 Six Flags (Premier Parks' successor) divests itself of its European operations. Its name is "Walygator Park" since April 6, 2007.

Comics Station Since 2017, the Comics Station indoor park in the Belgian city of Antwerp has a Smurf section. The interactive dark ride from Alterface Projects named "Het Magische Bos" (The Magic Wood) is the main of the six rides and animations Smurf.

Bobbejaanland and Minitalia Leolandia Park In 2014 and 2015, the Belgian park named Bobbejaanland has the Schtroumpf license. They are entitled to a permanent location in the park. In 2017, it is the turn of Minitalia Leolandia Park to also benefit from this license.

In Asia, adaptations on the theme of the Smurfs are more recent:

Motiongate Dubai At Motiongate Dubai, Smurfs Village is located in the park which opened on December 16, 2016. This section features five attractions, including "Smurf Village Express", a Gerstlauer Junior Coaster, and the "Smurfs Studio Tours" with 10 MysticMover vehicles from the Dutch manufacturer ETF Ride Systems.

Movie Animation Park Studios At Movie Animation Park Studios in Malaysia since 2017, Blast Off Zone hosts four attractions and animations Smurf.

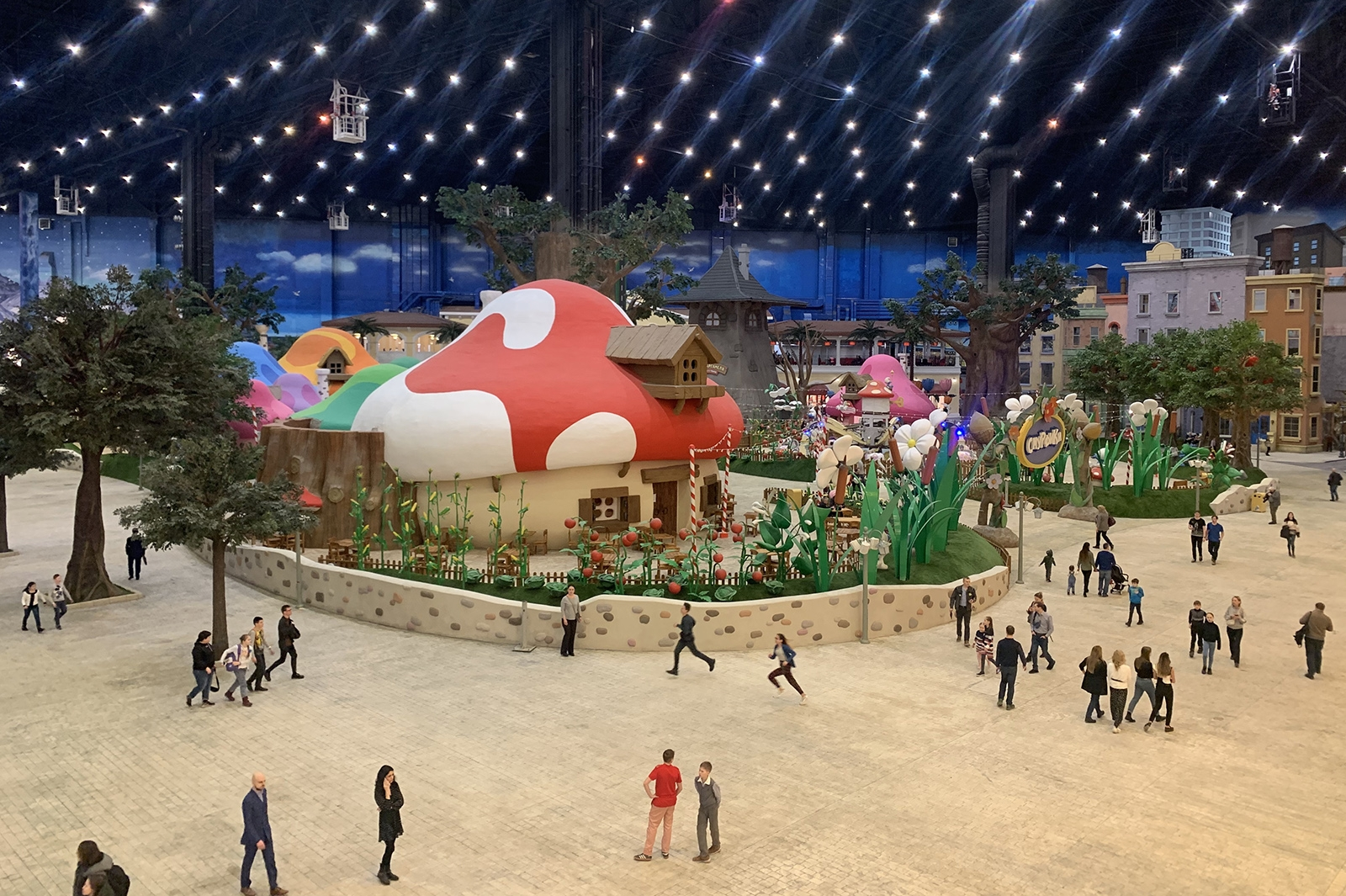
Smurf Village in Dream Island

Dream Island in Moscow, opened in 2020, offers Smurfs Village, a recreation of the village Smurf.

Dream City in Shanghai, opened in 2020, offers recreation of the village Smurf and Gargamel's House.

Majaland Gdańsk in Gdańsk, opened in 2024, offers rides themed after Smurfs.

== UNICEF ==
In 2005, an advertisement featuring The Smurfs was aired in Belgium in which the smurf village is annihilated by warbombs . Designed as a UNICEF advertisement, and with the approval of the family of the Smurfs' late creator Peyo, the 25-second episode was shown on the national evening news after the 9pm timeslot to avoid children seeing it. The scene starts with happy peaceful Smurfs and butterflies, who are then bombed by warplanes, ending with a lone Baby Smurf surrounded by dead Smurfs. The final frame bears the message: "Don't let war destroy the world of childhood." It was the keystone in a fund-raising campaign by UNICEF's Belgian arm to raise money for the rehabilitation of former child soldiers in Burundi and the Democratic Republic of the Congo—both former Belgian colonies.

The Smurfs celebrate their 50th anniversary in 2008, and UNICEF is again involved. Hundreds of white plastic Smurfs, just 20 cm (7.9 in) high, will be scattered in selected European cities for children to decorate. The plastic Smurfs will be laid down overnight - waiting at the bus stop, playing around the fountain, at the schoolyard – and kids will be able to pick them up in the morning. For those who miss the secret Smurf drop, others will be for sale from UNICEF, where the proceeds will help the children's fund.

The 2008 Smurf invasion will be accompanied by a traveling ‘Smurf Anniversary Exhibition’, telling the story of the Smurfs, with more than 50 “Smurfy games” for the younger fans, a Smurf Zeppelin and bigger, 1.2-metre-high (3.9 ft) Smurf statues that will be decorated by celebrity stars

== Food ==
- Smurf ice-creams were available in Australia in 1979. They consisted of two halves, each with its own stick, which could be easily separated. One half was a smurf blue (Smurfberry), water-based ice block, and the other half was white vanilla ice-cream.
- Smurfberry Crunch breakfast cereal was created in 1983 by Post, later renamed to Smurf Magic Berries in 1988. A limited-time Smurfs breakfast cereal was created in 2011 to coincide with the release of the 2011 Smurfs movie.
- The Haribo Smurfs are one of Haribo's most famous sweets.
- Other food products include biscuits (Jules Destrooper, Delacre), chocolates (Neuhaus) or bread.

== Notes ==
18. According to Guinness world records the largest collection of smurf memorabilia can be found in Ripon Wisconsin and is owned by Gerda Scheuers. Gerda has officially 6320 unique smurf items.
