= Papa Smurf =

Smurf character, leader of the smurfs

- Comics version of Papa Smurf

Publication information
- Publisher: Dupuis
- First appearance: Spirou magazine, 1958
- Created by: Peyo
- Voiced by: Richard Muller (1961–1967); Don Messick (1981–1989); Jonathan Winters (live-action films; 2011–2013); Jack Angel (short films; 2011–2013); Mandy Patinkin (2017); Davis Freeman (2021–present); John Goodman (2025 film)

In-story information
- Full name: Papa Smurf
- Species: Smurf
- Place of origin: Smurf Village
- Team affiliations: Smurfs; Johan and Peewit
- Notable aliases: Papa
- Abilities: High intelligence; Command of magic; Experienced alchemist and leader

Papa Smurf (French: Grand Schtroumpf) is a character from the comic strip The Smurfs. Most Smurfs are said to be about 100 years old. However, at the advanced age of 546 (553 in the 1980s series episode "The Littlest Giant"), Papa is the oldest Smurf and the leader of all Smurfs. Despite his age, he is still quite energetic. Easily distinguishable from all the other Smurfs, Papa Smurf has a bushy white mustache and beard and is typically dressed in red pants and a matching red Phrygian cap, making him the only Smurf who does not wear white. He was introduced in Peyo's 1958 Johan and Peewit story "La Flûte à Six Trous", the first appearance of the Smurfs.

Don Messick provided Papa Smurf's voice for the 1980s animated series as well as the special Cartoon All-Stars to the Rescue. Jonathan Winters, who voiced Grandpa Smurf on the animated series, was Papa Smurf's voice for the 2011 film and its 2013 sequel, with the latter being Winters' last film before his death. On The Smurfs: A Christmas Carol and The Smurfs: The Legend of Smurfy Hollow, Papa Smurf is voiced by Jack Angel. Mandy Patinkin voiced Papa Smurf in the animated film Smurfs: The Lost Village. Davis Freeman currently voices Papa Smurf in the 2021 Smurfs reboot. In the original French version, Papa Smurf's name is "Le Grand Schtroumpf” which means "the Great Smurf" or "the Big Smurf."

== History ==
Papa Smurf debuted in 1958 and is a gentle, humble, and knowledgeable village elder. As the Smurfs' leader, Papa is a central father figure that the Smurfs typically go to when seeking counsel. Due to his fatherly nature, Papa Smurf is always concerned about the Smurfs’ welfare and harmony. He is very altruistic and is always available to help anybody, whether Smurf or human. His great diplomatic skills are used when encountering humans or other creatures in the forest.

In the original comic books by Peyo, Papa Smurf has a much more forceful personality than in other portrayals. He is often portrayed in these comics as a cantankerous and irritable leader. In these comics, Papa has little patience and becomes easily angry with the Smurfs for being disobedient or making mistakes. However, in the 1981 series, he is a calm leader.

Papa Smurf's duty is to ensure that all the Smurfs of the village get along and respect each other. When real chaos arises, Papa Smurf usually resorts to drastic measures, often through the use of magic. For example, Papa switched bodies with the antagonist Gargamel in order to pretend to attack the village ("Smurf Versus Smurf" comic adventure/"Romeo and Smurfette" TV episode). In another instance, he creates an entire village full of evil doubles of the original Smurfs ("The Smurf Menace" issue).

While Papa Smurf sometimes prefers to not have to constantly fix problems, he realizes that it is his calling. He once said that since he may not be able to be the village leader forever, every Smurf should have a brief experience of commanding the village. To do so, Papa handed over his signature red hat, allowing each Smurf the chance to direct others on a construction project. The Smurfs were then referred to as "Papa Greedy", "Papa Clumsy" or "Mama Smurfette," depending on whose turn it was to be the village leader. While Papa did see the importance of each Smurf gaining leadership skills, his true purpose was to guide the Smurfs and help fix their problems and mistakes.

When he is not actively acting as the leader or helping other Smurfs, Papa Smurf indulges in his favorite hobby: magical chemistry, or alchemy. He often makes elixirs to help Smurfs who get into trouble. The Belgian comic portrays Papa Smurf constantly preparing magical drinks from white hellebore. The drawings that portray the effects of these alchemical brews are shown as both turbulent and amusing. Aside from his house, he also has a laboratory containing several chemical devices. Papa Smurf often tries to create potions to help the Smurfs but sometimes fails; such as the time he accidentally created a substance that turned any living thing into a huge monster (see the album: The Smurfs and the Cracoucass and the cartoon episode "The Smurfs and the Howlibird"). He occasionally leaves the village in order to obtain the necessary ingredients for his potions.

== Voice actors ==
- Richard Muller (1961-1967, The Smurfs)
- Bill Owen (1979; The Smurfs and the Magic Flute)
- Don Messick (1981–1990; The Smurfs, Cartoon All-Stars to the Rescue)
- Bill Capizzi/Michael Sorich (1983; The Smurfs and the Magic Flute)
- Jack Angel (2011–2013; The Smurfs Dance Party', The Smurfs: A Christmas Carol, The Smurfs: The Legend of Smurfy Hollow)
- Jonathan Winters (The Smurfs, The Smurfs 2)
- Mandy Patinkin (Smurfs: The Lost Village, 2017)
- Scott Innes (briefly)
- Davis Freeman (Smurfs Reboot)
- John Goodman (Smurfs)

== Names in other languages ==
The character's name variates in other languages, when translated (Papa/Daddy Smurf, Great/Big Smurf, Old Smurf)

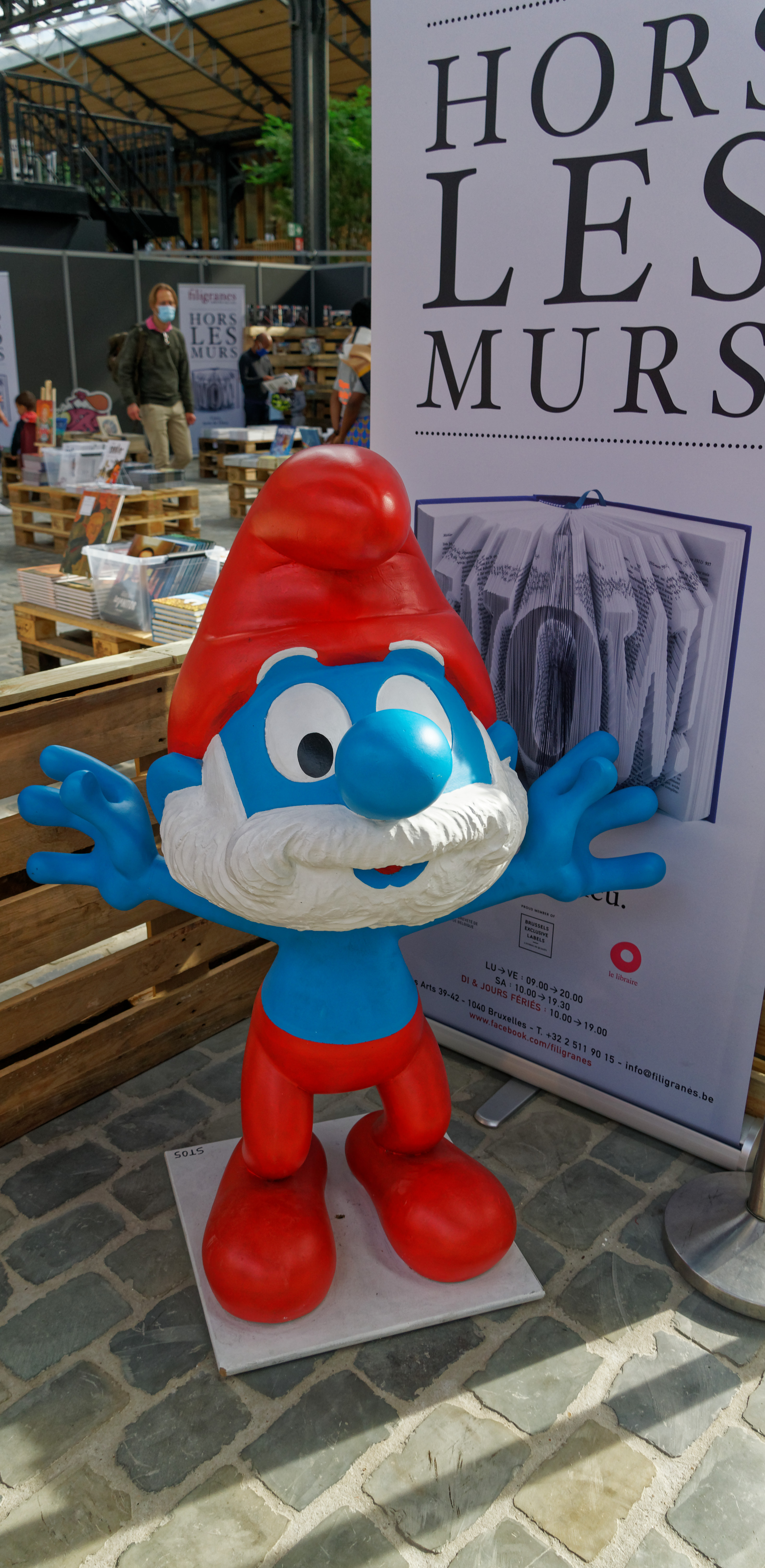
Papa Smurf figure, Brussels

- Czech: Taťka Šmoula
- Croatian: Papa Štrumpf
- Danish: Gammelsmølf
- Dutch/Flemish: Grote Smurf
- Finnish: Suursmurffi
- French: Le Grand Schtroumpf
- German: Großer Schlumpf / Papa Schlumpf
- Greek: Μπαμπαστρούμφ (Babastroúmf)
- Hungarian: Törpapa
- Italian: Grande Puffo
- Polish: Papa Smerf
- Portuguese: Papai / Grande Smurf
- Serbian: Велики Штрумпф (Veliki Štrumpf)
- Slovenian: Ata Smrk
- Spanish: Papá Pitufo
- Swedish: Gammelsmurf
- Turkish Şirin Baba
- Kabyle: Vavar ferfouchel
- Arabic: بابا سَنْفور

== See also ==
- List of characters in The Smurfs
