= The Smurfs (1961 TV series) =

Belgian animated television series

- Series screenshot
- Based on: The Smurfs by Peyo
- Written by: Peyo; Yvan Delporte
- Directed by: Maurice Rosy; Eddy Ryssack
- Voices of: Jacques Courtois; Marion; Nelly Béghin; Richard Muller; Jeannine Cherel
- Narrated by: Paul Roland
- Composer: Roland Renerte
- Country of origin: Belgium
- Original language: French
- No. of episodes: 9

Production
- Producer: Charles Dupuis
- Running time: 13 minutes
- Production company: TVA Dupuis

Original release
- Network: RTBF
- Release: November 12, 1961 – December 31, 1967

The Smurfs (French: Les Schtroumpfs) is a Belgian animated series that is an adaptation of the popular Belgian comic book series The Smurfs.

The show was produced by TVA Dupuis and aired on RTB (Radio Télévision Belge de la Communauté Française) from 1961 to 1967. Some of the television episodes from this series were chosen and became a part of the film Les Aventures des Schtroumpfs, which was released in 1965 in Belgium. Some of the recovered episodes are exhibited in the Belgian Comic Strip Center in Brussels.

In honor of The Smurfs' 65th anniversary on October 23, 2023, Peyo Productions and IMPS announced that five episodes from the 1960s series would get uploaded fully restored on Sundays on a weekly basis. "The Smurfnapper" was the first episode that was uploaded on October 27, 2023, followed by "The Flying Smurf" on November 3, 2023.

== Episode list ==
No.	Title	Original release date
1	"The Black Smurfs" (French: Les Schtroumpfs Noirs)	November 12, 1961
2	"The Egg and the Smurfs" (French: L'Œuf et les Schtroumpfs)	1961
3	"The Smurfnapper" (French: Le Voleur de Schtroumpfs)	1961
4	"The Fake Smurf" (French: Le faux Schtroumpf)	1961
5	"The Flying Smurf" (French: Le Schtroumpf volant)	1961
6	"The Unknown Smurf" (French: Le Schtroumpf cet inconnu)	1961
7	"The Smurf and His Dragon" (French: Le Schtroumpf et son dragon)	1961
8	"The Smurf Flute" (French: La Schtroumpflûte)	1961
9	"The Robot Smurf" (French: Le Schtroumpf-robot)	December 31, 1967

== Bibliography ==
- Hugues, Dayez (2003). Peyo l'enchanteur (in French) (Niffle ed.). Belgium. p. 77. ISBN 2-87393-046-2.
