= Dudley Knight =

American actor

- Born: July 1, 1939; Rochester, Minnesota, U.S.
- Died: June 27, 2013 (aged 73); Newport Beach, California, U.S.
- Occupations: Actor, speech expert
- Years active: 1961–2013
- Spouse: Marta Whistler

Dudley Knight (July 1, 1939 – June 27, 2013) was an American voice, speech, and dialect expert, as well as a stage and television actor. He was best known for his long career as a speech and dialect teacher and voice director for professional theatre. He conducted workshops and lectures on voice and speech for actors and voice teachers worldwide.

== Early life and career ==
Knight was born July 1, 1939, in Rochester, Minnesota. At age nine, during a class outing to see Laurence Olivier's film version of The Chronicle History of King Henry the Fifth with His Battell Fought at Agincourt in France, he became interested in William Shakespeare.

He graduated from the Yale School of Drama. He was a co-founder of Long Wharf Theatre in New Haven, Connecticut.

== Career ==
He was a professor at the University of California, Irvine, where he taught for twenty years. Knight coached voice, text, and dialects at many theatres, including the Utah Shakespearean Festival, the Colorado Shakespeare Festival, La Jolla Playhouse, South Coast Repertory, and American Conservatory Theater. From the mid to late 1970s, Knight hosted a weekly radio series, "The Graveyard Shift", on KPFK, Los Angeles, where he read famous horror stories.

He was a Master teacher of Fitzmaurice Voicework, which is based on the teachings of Catherine Fitzmaurice. He conducted workshops where he taught Knight-Thompson Speechwork, a skills-based approach to speech and accent training for actors that places emphasis on developing the speaker's detailed awareness of and engagement with the skills that make up language. His 2012 book, Speaking With Skill, is considered a major work in its field.

=== Acting ===
As an actor, he played major roles at American Conservatory Theater, South Coast Repertory, Mark Taper Forum, and the Utah and Colorado Shakespeare Festivals, among others. He is also known for roles in such films as the TV movie The Autobiography of Miss Jane Pittman (1974), The Candidate (1972) and One Is a Lonely Number (1972), as well as appearances on numerous TV series such as M*A*S*H, Police Story, Eight is Enough, The Facts of Life, and Knots Landing.

== Personal life and death ==
He was married to noted American painter and sculptor Marta Whistler. Dudley Knight died of a heart attack at his home in Newport Beach, California.

== Filmography ==
Year	Title	Role	Notes
1972	One Is a Lonely Number	King Lear	
1972	The Candidate	Magazine Editor	
1973	The Blue Knight	Mr. Pritchard	uncredited
1973	The Man Who Could Talk to Kids	Mr. Carling	ABC Movie of the Week
1974	The Autobiography of Miss Jane Pittman	Trooper Brown	
1974	Watched!	U.S. Attorney	
1980	First Family	Secretary of Defense Springfield	
1981	First Monday in October	Assistant manager	
1994	Pentathlon	Schiller	(final film role)
