= Bullyland =

German figurine company

Bullyland AG is a German–based manufacturing company founded in 1974 and based in Spraitbach (Ostalbkreis), known worldwide as a manufacturer of hand-painted collectors' models and figurines. Bullyland has offices in New York City and Hong Kong, its own production facilities in Germany and Eastern Europe and a worldwide distribution network.

== Product history ==
Bullyland's first product ranges in 1974 included Tip & Tap, mascots of the 1974 Football World Cup, which was held in the then West Germany. Further successful licences soon followed: Sesame Street, Asterix, The Smurfs, The Pink Panther Show, Alf, and others. They also manufactured the Astrosniks figurines.

Since 1977, Bullyland has also been a Walt Disney licensee. Creating Mickey and Minnie figures. The factory's other major current licences include Batman, Spider-Man, Pucca, Looney Tunes, Wendy and the Teletubbies.

In addition to these licensed ranges, Bullyland also produces a wide range of model animals – wild animals, farm animals, marine animals, prehistoric animals and others – as well as collectors' figurines such as cowboys and Indians, knights and fantasy figures.

Besides the principal ranges of models and figurines, the company also produces plastic money boxes, drinking straws, keyrings and soft Latex animals.

== Manufacturing ==
Bullyland uses in its manufacture a newly developed material created by its own research, and thus claims to be the only manufacturer in the world that uses neither dangerous phthalate softeners nor PVC for model and figurine production.

== Museum ==
In 1998 the company opened a museum in Spraitbach, displaying the whole range of products from the beginning, along with an adventure garden. The museum closed on July 1, 2009.
