= Schleich =

German producer of handpainted toy figurines and accessories

- Type: Private
- Industry: Entertainment
- Founded: 1935; 91 years ago
- Founder: Friedrich Schleich
- Headquarters: Schwäbisch Gmünd, Germany
- Area served: Worldwide
- Key people: Dirk Engehausen, Daniel Rupp, Udo Rother
- Products: Figurines
- Revenue: €188.7 million (2020)
- Owner: Partners Group
- Number of employees: 440 (2020)
- Website: gb.schleich-s.com

Schleich is a German producer of hand painted toy figurines and accessories. The company is headquartered in Schwäbisch Gmünd, Germany. In 2020, the group employed 440 people and generated sales of 188.7 million euros. Half of the sales are generated outside of the German domestic market, and Schleich branded play figurines and playsets are sold in over 60 countries. In 2022, the company sold a total of approximately 40 million figurines.

== History ==
In 1935, Friedrich Schleich (1900–1978) founded Schleich in Stuttgart as a supplier of plastic parts. In the 1950s, the company became known as Schleich Figuren, producing bendable plastic figurines for the first time. In the 1960s, the company focused on producing licensed toy figurines (merchandising). This included the development, production and marketing of comic figurines such as Snoopy, Maya the Bee, Mickey Mouse and the Smurfs. Especially with their Smurfs figurines, the company became widely recognised as a toy supplier.

In 1977, Friedrich Schleich sold the company. Until the end of 2006, Franz-Ulrich Köster, Klaus Schwarz and Paul Kraut senior were shareholders of the company. In the 1980s, Schleich shifted its focus from comic figurines to produce more detailed true to life animal figurines, but also started to produce Muppet characters.

When the three shareholders retired in 2006, Paul Kraut junior took over the management of the company, while the British investment company HG Capital invested 165 million euros and acquired 80% of the shares of the company. In 2013, Thomas van Kaldenkerken followed Kraut as CEO. After restructuring the company, van Kaldenkerken handed over the management in 2015 to Dirk Engehausen. Upon his arrival, the company's annual sales doubled from 2015 to 2020. The reason for this was, among other things, the expansion abroad. By 2015, around 80% of sales were generated in Germany; by 2020, that figure was just under 50%. The company grew primarily in the U.S., France, and the U.K.

In 2014, French investment company Ardian acquired Schleich for a price of 220 million euros. In 2016, to tap the American market, the toy maker acquired licenses to produce Peanuts as well as Justice League heroes such as Superman and Batman. Since mid-2019, the company belongs to Swiss based Partners Group.

During the COVID-19 pandemic, Schleich continued to increase its sales despite difficulties in its global supply chains. In 2023, Schleich introduced figurines for the Harry Potter book and film series.

== Corporate structure ==
Schleich is headquartered in Schwäbisch Gmünd, Germany. In 2020, the group employed 440 people and generated sales of 188.7 million euros. Half of sales are generated outside of the German domestic market, and Schleich branded play figurines and playsets are sold in over 60 countries. In 2022, the company sold a total of approximately 40 million figurines. Schleich GmbH is the seventh largest toy supplier in Germany, behind Lego, Playmobil, Hasbro, Mattel, Simba-Dickie, and Ravensburger.

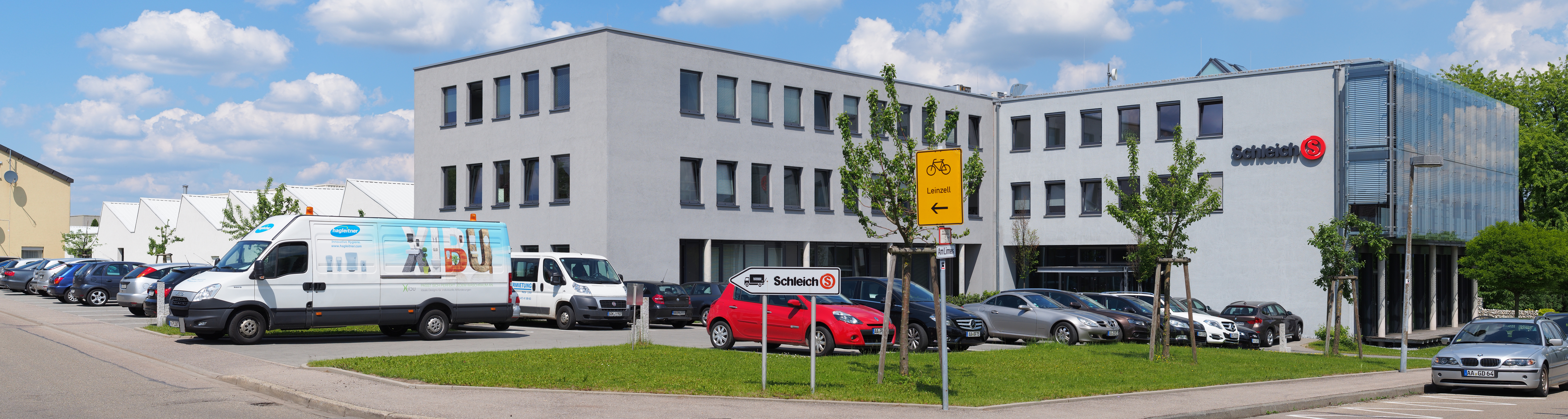
Schleich headquarters in Schwäbisch Gmünd

=== Revenue ===
Year	2011	2012	2013	2014	2015	2016	2017	2018	2019	2020
Revenue	93.1 mln €	81.6 mln €	89.8 mln €	95.3 mln €	113.8 mln €	123.1 mln €	136.9 mln €	161.4 mln €	178.7 mln €	188.7 mln €

Source: Bundesanzeiger

== Products ==
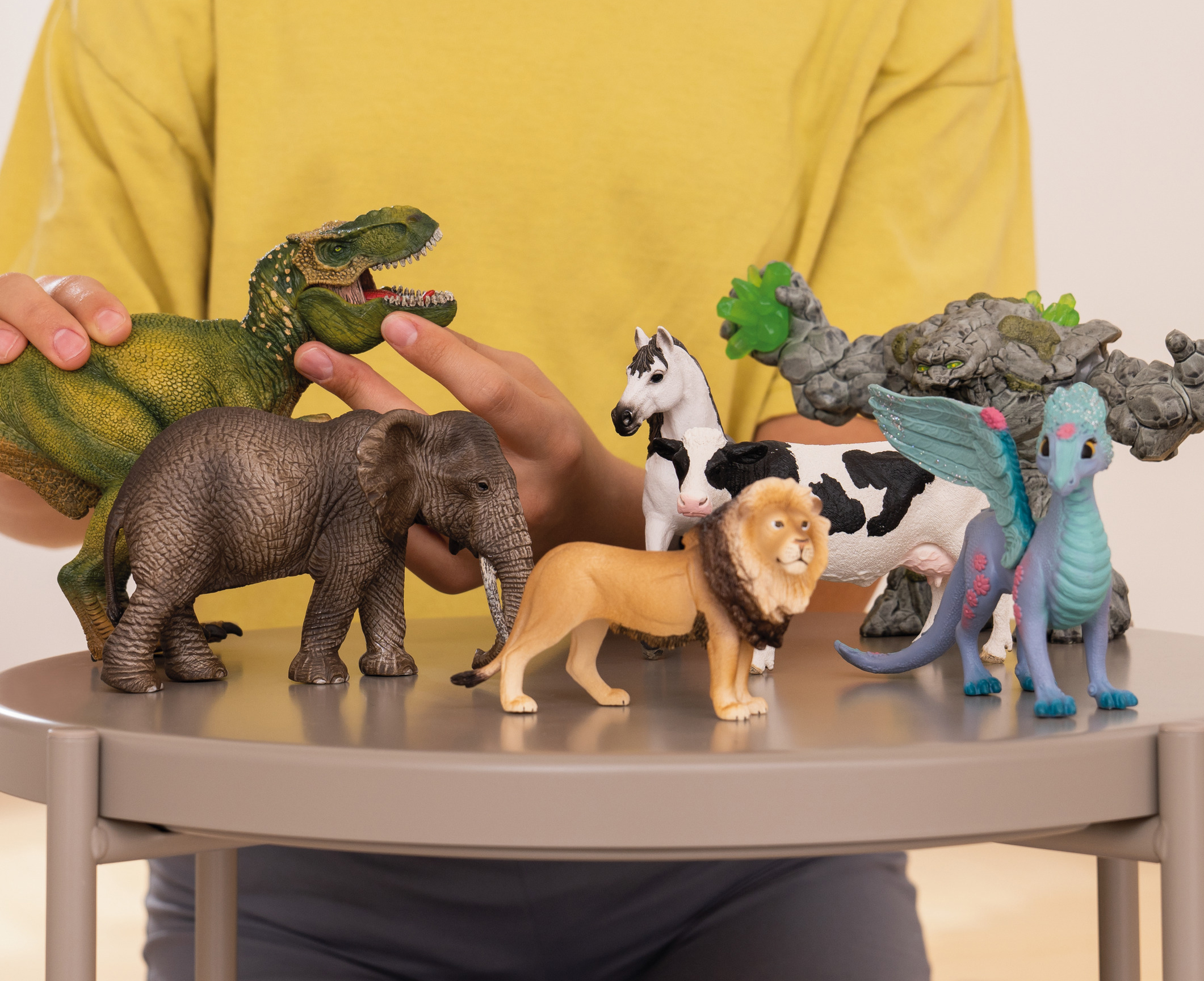
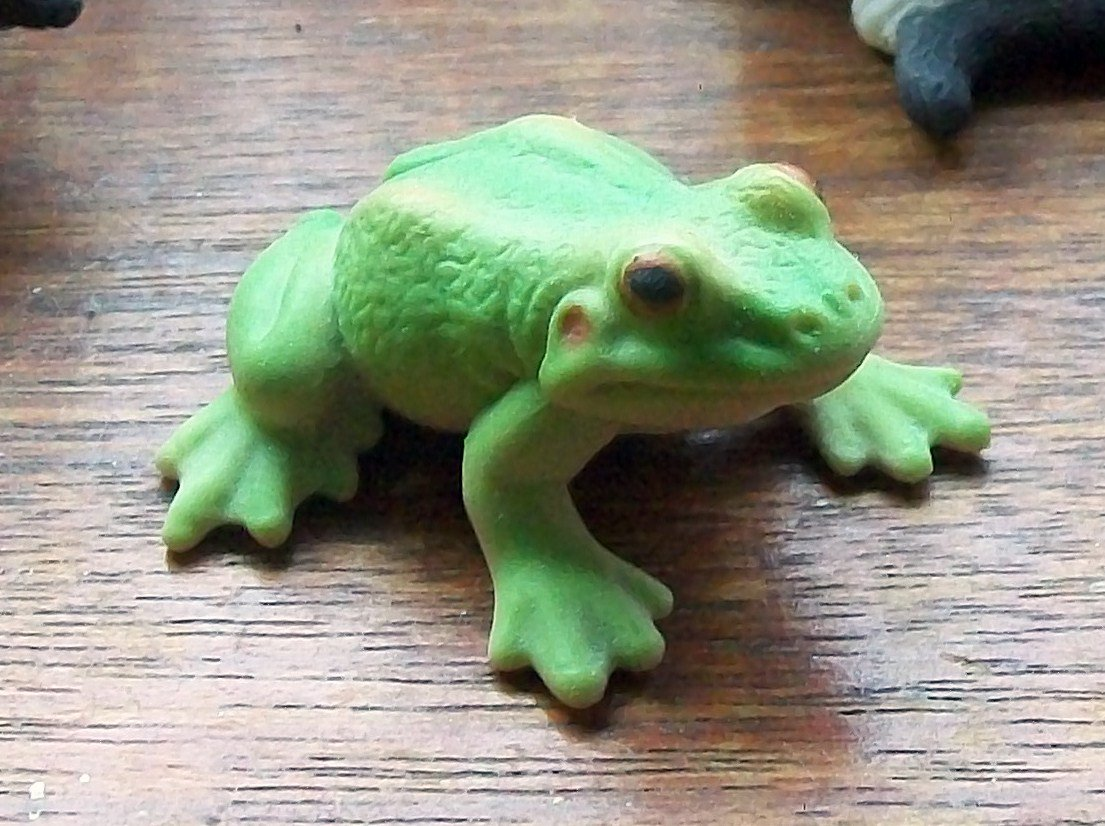
Several Schleich's animal figurines

Schleich produces lifelike and authentic figurines from various types of plastic using injection moulding. Starting in 2003, Schleich expanded its products to include playsets and other accessories, such as fantasy figurines. The toys and playsets are marketed with the help of play scenarios.

In the past, Schleich has licensed brands including Marvel, DC, Disney and Peanuts. The first major success for Schleich was JOPO, which were bendy figurines with long legs. From there, they met success with their first launch of smurf figurines. Since then, they have worked with different brands to portray characters as figurines.

=== Product lines ===
The line of figurines includes nine major brands owned by Schleich (as of 2023) and other figurines: Wild Life, Farm World, Horse Club, Sofie's Beauties, Dinosaurs, Bayala, Eldrador Creatures, The Smurfs and Harry Potter.

=== Design, production and materials ===
The design of products and the creation of tooling is mostly in-house. Production is at the German headquarters and in production facilities in foreign countries. When a figurine is manufactured, a digital model is first made on the computer, followed by a resin prototype. From this, a mould is made for the injection moulding machine. The figurines are then cast and hand painted at various locations in China, Germany, Spain, Portugal, Tunisia, Bosnia, and Romania. Schleich toys are made of different plastics, like polyvinyl chloride, so that the products are bite-, scratch- and saliva-resistant. They also add a softener developed by BASF called Hexamoll DINCH. These materials comply with the European Toy Directive 2009/48/EC and DIN EN 71.

=== Sustainability ===
All of Schleich's products and packaging are being optimised and certified according to the principles of the cradle-to-cradle circular economy. Further, since 2023 consumers have been able to return their Schleich figurines to the toy manufacturer for recycling. So far, only a few figurines have been returned. According to a survey conducted by Schleich in February 2023, the reason for this is that the figurines are rather passed on to friends, neighbours or the next generation.

== Sites ==
Schleich produces its figurines and playsets in Germany, Portugal, Romania, Moldova, Vietnam, Tunisia and China. In addition to its headquarters in Schwäbisch Gmünd, Schleich has locations in Munich, Amsterdam (Netherlands), Lyon (France), Milan (Italy), London (United Kingdom), Prague (Czechia), Charlotte (United States) and Tokyo (Japan).

After previous success, in 2019 Schleich began partnerships with major toy retailers in various locations in the United States, creating in-store Schleich flagship stores. The first of these were in Beverly Hills and San Mateo (California), and Kingston (Massachusetts).
