= Peyo =

Belgian comics cartoonist and scriptwriter (1928–1992)

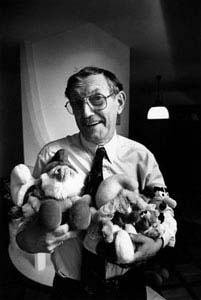
- Peyo in 1990
- Born: Pierre Culliford; 25 June 1928 Brussels, Belgium
- Died: 24 December 1992 (aged 64) Brussels, Belgium
- Areas: Writer, artist
- Notable works: The Smurfs; Johan et Pirlouit; Benoît Brisefer; Poussy
- Spouse: Nine Culliford (m. 1952)
- Children: 2

Pierre Culliford (French: [kylifɔʁd]; 25 June 1928 – 24 December 1992) was a Belgian comics writer and artist who worked under the pseudonym Peyo ([pejo]). His best-known works are the comic book series The Smurfs and Johan and Peewit, in the latter of which the Smurfs made their first appearance.

== Early life ==
Culliford was born in 1928 in the Brussels municipality of Schaerbeek, Belgium. He was the son of an English father and a Belgian mother.

== Career ==
Culliford took on the name "Peyo" early in his professional career, based on an English cousin's mispronunciation of Pierrot (a diminutive form of Pierre).

After working briefly at the Compagnie Belge d'Actualités (CBA), a small and short-lived Belgian animation studio, Peyo began making comic strips for daily newspapers such as Le Soir shortly after World War II. At the beginning of the 1950s, he brought his character Johan to the magazine Spirou, whom he soon gave a companion, the diminutive Peewit; the strip soon became a staple of the weeklies. Peyo introduced the Smurfs in the Johan and Peewit storyline The Magic Flute in 1958; the characters quickly supplanted Johan and Peewit in popularity and left them behind for their own series.

In 1960, Peyo founded a studio to accommodate his assistants such as François Walthéry, Gos, and Marc Wasterlain and created the series Steven Strong and Jacky and Célestin. Peyo's output diminished in the 1970s, at first due to the time he invested in The Smurfs and the Magic Flute (1976), a film adaptation of the Johan and Peewit story "La flûte à six schtroumpfs"; in the 1980s, he put more time, despite recurrent health problems, into an American adaptation of The Smurfs as an animated television series. After the series concluded, he left his publisher Dupuis to found his own publishing house, Cartoon Creation, and a cartoon magazine, Schtroumpf!, which soon folded due to management problems. He joined Le Lombard in 1992 but died a few months later.

Peyo began work, fresh from his coursework at the Académie Royale des Beaux-Arts in Brussels, at the Compagnie belge d'actualités (CBA), a small Belgian animation studio, where he met a few of his future colleagues and co-celebrities, like André Franquin, Morris, and Eddy Paape. When the studio folded after the war, the other artists went to work for Dupuis, but Peyo, a few years younger than the others, was not accepted. He made his first comics for the newspaper La Dernière Heure (The Latest Hour), but also accepted many promotional drawing jobs for income. From 1949 to 1952, he drew Poussy, a gag-a-day comic about a cat, for Le Soir. For the same newspaper, he also created Johan.

In 1952, Franquin introduced Peyo to Spirou, a children's Franco-Belgian comics magazine published by Dupuis. Peyo wrote and drew a number of characters and storylines, including Pierrot, and Benoît Brisefer (translated into English as Steven Strong). But his favourite was Johan et Pirlouit (translated into English as Johan and Peewit), which was a continuation of the series Johan he had created earlier. He also continued Poussy in Spirou.

Set in the Middle Ages in Europe, Johan et Pirlouit stars a brave young page to the king, and his faithful, if boastful and cheating, dwarf sidekick. Johan rides off to defend the meek on his trusty horse, while Peewit gallops sporadically behind on his goat, named Biquette. The pair was driven by duty to their king and the courage to defend the underpowered. Peewit only appeared in the third adventure in 1954 but would stay for all later adventures.

== Smurfs ==
The first Smurf appeared in Johan and Peewit on 23 October 1958 in the album La Flûte à Six Schtroumpfs (The Six Smurfed Flute). As the Smurfs became increasingly popular, Peyo started a studio in the early 1960s, where a number of talented comics artists started to work. Peyo himself supervised the work and worked primarily on Johan and Peewit, leaving the Smurfs to the studio. The most notable artists to come out of this studio were Walthéry, Marc Wasterlain, Roland Goossens (Gos), Derib, Lucien De Gieter, and Daniel Desorgher.

In 1959, the Smurfs got their own series, and in 1960, two more began: Steven Strong and Jacky and Célestin. Many authors of the Marcinelle school collaborated on the writing, or on the artwork, including Willy Maltaite (aka 'Will'), Yvan Delporte, and Roger Leloup. Peyo became more of a businessman and supervisor and was less involved in the actual creation of the comics. He let his son, Thierry Culliford, lead the studio, while his daughter Véronique was responsible for the merchandising (I.M.P.S. was established in 1985 by her).

The merchandising of the Smurfs began in 1959, with the PVC figurines as the most important aspect until the late 1970s. Then, with the success of The Smurfs records by Pierre Kartner, the Smurfs achieved more international success, with a new boom in toys and gadgets. Some of these reached the United States, where Hanna-Barbera created a Saturday morning animated series in 1981 for which Peyo served as story supervisor. Peyo's health began to fail. Following Hanna Barbara's decision to include the Smurfs in Cartoon All Stars to the Rescue without his permission, he would sever ties between Hanna Barbara and the Smurfs.

In 1989, after his partnership with Dupuis ended, he established Cartoon Creation to publish new Smurf stories. In late 1991, the company was forced to shut down due to mismanagement. The publishing rights were soon sold to Le Lombard.

== Personal life, death, and legacy ==
Culliford married Nine Devroye in 1952 and they had two children. He was also acknowledged to have been a smoker. He died of a heart attack in Brussels on 24 December 1992, aged 64. His studio still exists, and new stories for various series are regularly produced under his name.

Since his death, Peyo's children have continued to promote his work under the brand "Peyo". In the 2011 film The Smurfs, Peyo was included in the plot as a researcher who studied the myths concerning the Smurfs, who were made to be real-life legendary creatures in the film's storyline.

== Awards and honours ==
- He received the Youth Prize (9–12 years) award 1984 at the Angoulême International Comics Festival, France.
- The 50th anniversary of The Smurfs and the 80th anniversary of the birth of its creator was celebrated by issuing a high-value collectors' coin: the Belgian 5 euro 50th anniversary of The Smurfs commemorative coin, minted in 2008.

== Bibliography ==
Only those comics Peyo collaborated on are listed here: the comics made in those series after his death can be found in the articles for each series. Artist and writers mentioned are only those officially credited: unnamed studio collaborators are not listed here.

- Jacky and Célestin, 1960–1978: 10 stories in Le Soir, 4 albums by Dupuis: artwork by François Walthéry, Francis, Jo-El Azara and Mitteï, stories by Peyo, Gos, and Vicq
- Johan and Peewit (Johan et Pirlouit), 1952–1970: 13 albums by Dupuis
- Natacha, 1992: 1 album by Dupuis, artwork by Walthéry, story by Peyo
- Pierrot (comics): 1991, 1 album by Cartoon Creation
- Poussy (Pussycat), 1977–, 3 albums by Dupuis
- The Smurfs (Les Schtroumpfs), 1959–, 17 albums by Dupuis: additional artwork by Alain Maury and Luc Parthoens, additional stories by Yvan Delporte, Gos, Thierry Culliford
- Spirou & Fantasio, 1969, 1 album by Dupuis, artwork by André Franquin and Jidéhem, story by Peyo and Gos
- Steven Strong a.k.a. Benny Breakiron (Benoît Brisefer), 1960–1978, 7 albums by Dupuis, additional artwork by Will, Walthéry, Marc Wasterlain and Albert Blesteau, additional stories by Yvan Delporte, Gos, and Blesteau
