= 1947 in animation =

Events in 1947 in animation.

== Events ==
=== January ===
- January 10: Ivan Ivanov-Vano's The Humpbacked Horse is first released.
- January 11: The Crab with the Golden Claws premieres, a stop-motion film directed by Claude Misonne (pseudonym for Simone Swaelens). It is the first animated film based on Hergé's popular comics series The Adventures of Tintin.
- January 18: Robert McKimson's Porky Pig cartoon One Meat Brawl premieres, produced by Warner Bros. Cartoons. Also starring Barnyard Dawg (named Mandrake in this short).
- January 25: Arthur Davis' Goofy Gophers, produced by Warner Bros. Cartoons is first released where the Goofy Gophers make their debuts. Bugs Bunny makes a cameo at the end of the short.

=== February ===
- February 22': William Hanna and Joseph Barbera's Tom and Jerry short Cat Fishin premieres, produced by MGM's Cartoon Studio and also starring Spike the bulldog.

=== March ===
- March 13: 19th Academy Awards: Hanna-Barbera's Tom and Jerry cartoon The Cat Concerto wins the Academy Award for Best Animated Short (just a month before it released in theaters) Controversy arises, because Warner Brothers's Bugs Bunny cartoon Rhapsody Rabbit (directed by Friz Freleng) has a similar plot and is said to have been omitted from nomination because it was screened to the Academy jury after they had watched The Cat Concerto. The jury assumed that it was a case of mere plagiarism. Today most historians assume that both cartoons were produced at the same time and most of their similarities are coincidental.
- March 15: William Hanna and Joseph Barbera's Tom and Jerry short Part Time Pal premieres, produced by MGM's Cartoon Studio and also starring Mammy Two Shoes.
- March 22: Friz Freleng's Bugs Bunny cartoon A Hare Grows in Manhattan premieres, produced by Warner Bros. Cartoons.

=== April ===
- April 12:
  - Robert McKimson's Daffy Duck cartoon Birth of a Notion premieres, produced by Warner Bros. Cartoons.
  - Tex Avery's George and Junior cartoon Hound Hunters premieres, produced by MGM's Cartoon Studio.
- April 18: Jack Hannah's Donald Duck cartoon Straight Shooters is first released, produced by Walt Disney Animation Studios. Also starring Huey, Dewey, and Louie.
- April 26: Hanna-Barbera's Tom and Jerry cartoon The Cat Concerto premieres, produced by MGM's Cartoon Studio.

=== May ===
- May 3: In Friz Freleng's Tweetie Pie premieres, produced by Warner Bros. Cartoons. Bob Clampett's character Tweety Bird and Freleng's Sylvester the Cat are first paired together, thus marking the start of the Tweety & Sylvester series. It is also the first time where Tweety is seen as Yellow instead of Pink.
- May 9: Jack King's Donald Duck cartoon Sleepy Time Donald is first released, produced by Walt Disney Animation Studios. It features Donald suffering from sleepwalking and Daisy Duck preventing him from hurting himself.
- May 10: Friz Freleng's Bugs Bunny cartoon Rabbit Transit premieres, produced by Warner Bros. Cartoons. This is the final time where Bugs Bunny competes against Cecil Turtle, as it's the latter's final appearance in the Golden Age of Animation.
- May 16 - November 15: A huge strike takes place at Terrytoons, where Paul Terry refuses to negotiate a union contract with the Screen Cartoonist's Guild and fires several of his animators.
- May 31: Tex Avery's George and Junior cartoon Red Hot Rangers premieres, produced by MGM's Cartoon Studio.

=== June ===
- June 4: Friz Freleng's Daffy Duck cartoon Along Came Daffy premieres, produced by Warner Bros. Cartoons. Also starring Yosemite Sam (and a twin-brother lookalike).
- June 14: Hanna-Barbera's Tom and Jerry short Dr. Jekyll and Mr. Mouse premieres, produced by MGM's Cartoon Studio.
- June 20: Jack Hannah's Donald Duck cartoon Clown of the Jungle premieres, produced by Walt Disney Animation Studios.
- June 28: Robert McKimson's Bugs Bunny cartoon Easter Yeggs premieres, produced by Warner Bros. Cartoons. Also starring Elmer Fudd.

=== July ===
- July 11: Jack King's Donald Duck cartoon Donald's Dilemma premieres, produced by Walt Disney Animation Studios, in which Daisy Duck tells her psychologist about how Donald's singing voice improves due to a flower pot falling on his head.
- July 12:
  - Robert McKimson's cartoon Crowing Pains, produced by Warner Bros. Cartoons, is first released. Starring Foghorn Leghorn, Henery Hawk, Barnyard Dawg, & Sylvester (in which the latter makes his debut in a Robert McKimson short).
  - Hanna-Barbera's Tom and Jerry cartoon Salt Water Tabby premieres, produced by MGM's Cartoon Studio and also starring Toodles Galore.
- July 19:
  - George Pal's Tubby the Tuba is first released.
  - Tex Avery's Uncle Tom's Cabaña, produced by MGM's Cartoon Studio, is first released.

=== August ===
- August 2: Chuck Jones' Daffy Duck and Elmer Fudd cartoon A Pest in the House premieres, produced by Warner Bros. Cartoons.
- August 22: Jack Hannah's Donald Duck cartoon Bootle Beetle premieres, produced by Walt Disney Animation Studios.
- August 30: Hanna-Barbera's Tom and Jerry short A Mouse in the House premieres, produced by MGM's Cartoon Studio. Also starring Butch and Mammy Two Shoes.

=== September ===
- September 12–25: During the 1947 Cannes Film Festival the film Dumbo by Walt Disney Animation Studios receives the Grand Prix pour Meilleur Dessin Animé (Grand Prize for Best Animated Film).
- September 12: Jack King's Donald Duck cartoon Wide Open Spaces premieres, produced by Walt Disney Animation Studios.
- September 20: Tex Avery's Slap Happy Lion premieres, produced by MGM's Cartoon Studio.
- September 27:
  - Jack Kinney, Bill Roberts, Hamilton Luske and William Morgan's Fun and Fancy Free premieres, produced by Walt Disney Animation Studios. It consists of the shorts Bongo and Mickey and the Beanstalk.
  - Hanna-Barbera's Tom and Jerry short The Invisible Mouse premieres, produced by MGM's Cartoon Studio. Spike makes a brief appearance at the end where he constantly whacks Tom with a golf club after believing the cat hit him with the golf club first, when it was actually Jerry.

=== October ===
- October 4: Chuck Jones' Porky Pig cartoon Little Orphan Airedale premieres, produced by Warner Bros. Cartoons, in which Charlie Dog makes his debut. It is a complete remake of Bob Clampett's 1941 short Porky's Pooch.
- October 10: In Seymour Kneitel's Naughty But Mice, produced for Famous Studios, Herman and Katnip are first paired as a duo.
- October 24: Walt Disney testifies for the House Un-American Activities Committee and accuses several of his former employees of being Communist sympathizers, resulting in several of them being blacklisted.
- October 25: Arthur Davis' cartoon Doggone Cats premieres, produced by Warner Bros. Cartoons. This is one of Davis' two shorts to star Sylvester.

=== November ===
- November 1: Friz Freleng's Bugs Bunny and Elmer Fudd short Slick Hare, produced by Warner Bros. Cartoons, is first released, a cartoon which features many caricatures of Hollywood celebrities.
- November 28: Jack Hannah's Donald Duck cartoon Chip an' Dale premieres, produced by Walt Disney Animation Studios, in which Chip 'n' Dale are first paired with Donald Duck.
- November 29: Arthur Davis' first Daffy Duck cartoon Mexican Joyride premieres, produced by Warner Bros. Cartoons.

=== December ===
- December 5: Little Audrey debuts in the short film Santa's Surprise, produced by Famous Studios.
- December 6:
  - Tex Avery's King-Size Canary premieres, produced by MGM's Cartoon Studio.
  - Arthur Davis' cartoon Catch as Cats Can, produced by Warner Bros. Cartoons. This is Davis' second & final short to star Sylvester.
- December 13: Jiří Trnka's Spalicek (The Czech Year) is first released. It is his debut animated feature and will win critical acclaim.

== Specific date unknown ==
- George Moreno Jr.'s Bubble and Squeek is first released.

== Films released ==
- January 10 - The Humpbacked Horse (Soviet Union)
- January 11 - The Crab with the Golden Claws (Belgium)
- September 27 - Fun and Fancy Free (United States)
- December 13 - The Czech Year (Czechoslovakia)

== Births ==
=== January ===
- January 1: Sigifredo Vega, Colombian actor (Latin American dub voice of Santa Claus in The Cuphead Show!, Shikijo in Rurouni Kenshin, Satotz in Hunter x Hunter, Aoi Satan in Sakura Wars, Kilobot in Cubix, Sprong in The Secret Show, Chairface Chippendale in The Tick), (d. 2024).
- January 2: Eiji Kusuhara, Japanese-born English actor (voice of Dr. Kamikazi in Robotboy), (d. 2010).
- January 8: David Bowie, English rock singer and actor (voice of Lord Royal Highness in SpongeBob SquarePants and Emperor Maltazard in Arthur and the Invisibles), (d. 2016).
- January 15: Andrea Martin, American-Canadian actress, singer, and comedian (voice of Ms. Fowl in The Adventures of Jimmy Neutron: Boy Genius, Splatter Phoenix in Darkwing Duck, Aunt Miriam Pickles in Rugrats, Queen Slug-For-A-Butt in Earthworm Jim, Mad Harriet in Superman: The Animated Series, Mrs. Stoppable in Kim Possible, Ms. Meaney in The New Woody Woodpecker Show, Miss Carbuncle in Frosty Returns, Mrs. Bigby in Mickey and the Roadster Racers, Lisa Lorraine in the Batman: The Animated Series episode "Make 'Em Laugh", Waylon Jeepers' Neighbor in the Freakazoid! episode "Statuesque").
- January 17: Todd Susman, American actor (voice of P.A. Announcer in the Futurama episode "War Is the H-Word").
- January 18: Alfred R. Kahn, American executive (4Kids Entertainment).
- January 19: Wendell Washer, American animator (Filmation, The Scooby-Doo/Dynomutt Hour), storyboard artist (Hanna-Barbera, Filmation, The Puppy's Further Adventures, Marvel Productions, Disney Television Animation, Dragon Tales, The New Woody Woodpecker Show, Warner Bros. Animation, LeapFrog), character designer (The Puppy's Further Adventures, Blondie and Dagwood) and writer (The Tom and Jerry Comedy Show), (d. 2022).
- January 21: Jill Eikenberry, American actress (voice of Mrs. Wilson in the Batman Beyond episode "Hidden Agenda", Merf in the Aaahh!!! Real Monsters episode "Where Have All the Monsters Gone?").
- January 28: Hiram Titus, American composer and orchestrator (ALF Tales, Attack of the Killer Tomatoes, Saban's Adventures of the Little Mermaid), (d. 2013).
- January 29:
  - Gerald Polley, American singer, activist and animator, (d. 2012).
  - Juan Padrón, Cuban comics artist and animator (Vampires in Havana), (d. 2020).
- January 31: Jonathan Banks, American actor (voice of Rick Dicker in Incredibles 2, Black Mask in Catwoman: Hunted, Eruptor in Skylanders Academy, William Murphy in F is for Family, various voices in Axe Cop, Quirin in Rapunzel's Tangled Adventure, Johannes in A Tale Dark & Grimm, Filbrick Pines in the Gravity Falls episode "A Tale of Two Stans", The Wizard in the Mike Tyson Mysteries episode "Is Magic Real?", Composite Superman in the Robot Chicken episode "Robot Chicken DC Comics Special III: Magical Friendship", Coach Crawford in The Casagrandes episode "Team Effort").

=== February ===
- February 2: Farrah Fawcett, American actress (voice of Faucet in The Brave Little Toaster Goes to Mars, herself in the Johnny Bravo episode "Johnny Meets Farrah Fawcett"), (d. 2009).
- February 3: Claude Berda, French studio executive (AB Groupe), (d. 2025).
- February 5:
  - György Gát, Hungarian director and producer (A Fox's Tale), (d. 2024).
  - Darrell Waltrip, American motorsports analyst, author, former national television broadcaster, and stock car driver (voice of Darrell Cartrip in the Cars franchise).
- February 7:
  - Wayne Allwine, American actor (voice of Mickey Mouse from 1977 to 2009), (d. 2009).
  - Loren Carpenter, American computer graphics researcher and developer (Pixar), (d. 2025).
- February 11: Bruce Bickford, American animator (made the surreal clay-animated sequences in Frank Zappa's concert films The Dub Room Special, Baby Snakes and The Amazing Mr. Bickford), (d. 2019).
- February 12:
  - Tommy Luske, American actor (voice of Michael Darling in Peter Pan), (d. 1990).
  - Yuji Nunokawa, Japanese film director (founder of Pierrot), (d. 2022).
- February 16: Giorgio Lopez, Italian voice actor (dub voice of King Harold in the Shrek franchise and Scrooge McDuck from Disney), (d. 2021).
- February 20: Peter Strauss, American actor (voice of Justin in The Secret of NIMH, Stoker in Biker Mice from Mars, Steven Carlyle in the Batman: The Animated Series episode "House and Garden", Walter Langkowski in The Incredible Hulk episode "Man to Man, Beast to Beast").
- February 24: Edward James Olmos, Mexican-American actor, director, producer, and activist (voice of Chief Tannabok in The Road to El Dorado, Mito in Nausicaä of the Valley of the Wind, Chicharrón in Coco, Molecule Man in Moon Girl and Devil Dinosaur, King Pescoro in Elena of Avalor, Gayo "El Jefe" in El Americano: The Movie, Gaff in Blade Runner Black Out 2022, Mr. Ramon in The Magic School Bus episode "Going Batty", Pit Master in The Simpsons episode "Cue Detective", Angel Rojas in The Batman episode "The Bat in the Belfry").
- February 25: Bill Ratner, American voice actor, author and solo performance artist (voice of Flint in G.I. Joe: A Real American Hero).

=== March ===
- March 6: Rob Reiner, American director, and actor (voice of Screwie in Everyone's Hero, himself in The Simpsons episode "Million Dollar Abie"), (d. 2025).
- March 9: Marv Newland, American-Canadian filmmaker (Bambi Meets Godzilla, Sesame Street, Gary Larson's Tales From the Far Side).
- March 17: Yury Chernavsky, Russian composer (Wings, legs and tails, Investigation Held by Kolobki), (d. 2025).
- March 18:
  - Susan Sheridan, English actress (voice of Princess Eilonwy in The Black Cauldron, Noddy in Noddy's Toyland Adventures), (d. 2015).
  - Drew Struzan, American film poster artist (The Fox and the Hound, The Secret of NIMH, An American Tail, The Land Before Time, All Dogs Go to Heaven, DuckTales the Movie: Treasure of the Lost Lamp, Aladdin, We're Back! A Dinosaur's Story, All Dogs Go to Heaven 2, Anastasia, Spirit: Stallion of the Cimarron, How To Train Your Dragon 2, Animal Crackers), (d. 2025).
- March 19: Glenn Close, American actress (voice of Mona Simpson in The Simpsons, Kala in Tarzan and Tarzan II, Granny in Hoodwinked and Hoodwinked Too! Hood vs. Evil, Mothership in 3Below: Tales of Arcadia).
- March 21: Don Markstein, American comics, cartoons and animation scholar (Don Markstein's Toonopedia) and editor (Comics Revue, co-founder of Apatoons), (d. 2012).
- March 22:
  - Tony Pope, American actor (voice of the Big Bad Wolf in Who Framed Roger Rabbit, Geppetto in House of Mouse, Wreck-Gar in The Transformers, Junior in What a Cartoon!, Scientist in the Superman: The Animated Series episode "New Kids in Town", continued voice of Goofy), (d. 2004).
  - Florence Warner, American singer (voice of the Balladeer and Adult Abigail in Once Upon a Forest, provided additional voices for Jem, performed "Once Upon a Time With Me" for Once Upon a Forest), (d. 2024).
- March 24: Jiří Bartoška, Czech actor (Czech dub voice of Dr. Dubsky in Living Large), (d. 2025).
- March 25: Elton John, English singer, pianist, and composer (The Lion King, The Road to El Dorado, Gnomeo & Juliet, voiced himself in the South Park episode "Chef Aid" and The Simpsons episode "I'm with Cupid").
- March 27: Chick Vennera, American actor (voice of Pesto in Animaniacs, Lorenzo in The Real Adventures of Jonny Quest, Ferret in Static Shock, Chauffeur in the Batman Beyond episode "Ace in the Hole"), (d. 2021).
- March 30: Haruo Takahashi, Japanese animator (Tiger Mask, Silver Fang, Inspector Gadget), (d. 2024).

=== April ===
- April 4: Jacques Frantz, French actor (voice of Obelix in Asterix and the Vikings), (d. 2021).
- April 6: John Ratzenberger, American actor (Pixar).
- April 9: Gianni Quillico, Italian actor (Italian dub voice of Spider-Man in Spider-Man 1967 and Spider-Man 1981, Kobra Khan in He-Man and the Masters of the Universe, Greed in Fullmetal Alchemist, Caesar Clown in One Piece, Leonard Powers in Ugly Americans, Musashi in Gintama, Nariyoshi Tokugawa in Hell's Paradise, Taisho Sushiya in Beyblade X), (d. 2026).
- April 10: Ewa Dalkowska, Polish actress (Polish dub voice of Pearl Gesner in Home on the Range), (d. 2025).
- April 11:
  - Tedde Moore, Canadian actress (voice of Polie-Anna in Rolie Polie Olie), (d. 2026).
  - Meshach Taylor, American actor (voice of Cecil in The Secret of NIMH 2: Timmy to the Rescue, Doctor Harris in the Static Shock episode "Aftershock"), (d. 2014).
- April 12:
  - David Letterman, American television host and comedian (voice of Mötley Crüe Roadie in Beavis and Butt-Head Do America, himself in The Simpsons episode "The D'oh-cial Network" and the Beavis and Butt-Head episode "Late Night with Butt-Head").
  - Dan Lauria, American actor (voice of Sean Foley in the Static Shock episode "Sons of the Fathers", Bill Wallace in the Batman Beyond episode "Earth Mover").
  - Michele Brourman, American composer and songwriter (The Land Before Time).
  - Tom Clancy, American novelist (voiced himself in The Simpsons episode "Diatribe of a Mad Housewife"), (d. 2013).
- April 16: Kareem Abdul-Jabbar, American former professional basketball player (voiced himself in The Critic episode "A Day at the Races and A Night at the Opera", and The Simpsons episode "Love Is a Many Strangled Thing").
- April 18:
  - James Woods, American actor (voice of Hades in the Hercules franchise and House of Mouse, the Narrator in Hooves of Fire, Dr. Phillium Benedict in Recess: School's Out, Falcon in Stuart Little 2, Gloomius Maximus in Rolie Polie Olie: The Great Defender of Fun, Reggie Belafonte in Surf's Up, Owlman in Justice League: Crisis on Two Earths, Victor in Bling, Lex Luthor in Justice League Action, Major Baklava in the Clerks: The Animated Series episode "Leonardo Is Caught In The Grip Of An Outbreak Of Randal's Imagination And Patrick Swayze Either Does Or Doesn't Work In The New Pet Store", Manny Kowalski in the Odd Job Jack episode "Orgy: The Musical", himself in The Simpsons episode "Homer and Apu" and Family Guy).
  - Jerzy Stuhr, Polish actor, director and screenwriter (Polish dub voice of Mushu in the Mulan franchise, Donkey in the Shrek franchise), (d. 2024).
- April 19: Mark Volman, American musician and composer (Down and Dirty Duck, Strawberry Shortcake, Peter and the Magic Egg, The Adventures of the American Rabbit), (d. 2025).
- April 21: Iggy Pop, American musician and actor (voice of one of the Baby Singers in The Rugrats Movie, Darkos in Arthur 3: The War of the Two Worlds, Texas Red in the Mr. Pickles episode "Where Is Mr. Pickles?", Sneaky Silverado in the Sheriff Callie's Wild West episode "Blazing Skaters", Jerry in the American Dad! episode "American Dream Factory", Lil' Rummy in the Lil' Bush episode "Anthem/China", singing voice of Mok Swagger in Rock & Rule, performed the theme song of Space Goofs).
- April 24: Márcia Gomes, Brazilian voice actress (Brazilian dub voice of Luna in Sailor Moon, Janine Melnitz in The Real Ghostbusters, Didi Pickles in Rugrats, Eris in Saint Seiya), (d. 2024).
- April 25: Joana Brito, Mexican actress (Latin American dub voice of Mama Odie in The Princess and the Frog, Eema in Dinosaur, Frances Albacore in Cats Don't Dance, Zira in The Lion King II: Simba's Pride, Morgana in The Little Mermaid II: Return to the Sea), (d. 2023).
- April 26:
  - Ron McLarty, American actor, playwright and novelist (voice of Papa Bear and the Narrator in The Berenstain Bears specials, the General in Courage the Cowardly Dog), (d. 2020).
  - Betty G. Birney, American author and television writer (Snorks, DIC Entertainment, Fraggle Rock: The Animated Series, Doug, Bobby's World, Adventures from the Book of Virtues).
  - Jorga Kotrbová, Czech actress (Czech dub voice of the Princess in Rainbow Brite and the Star Stealer, Andrea Beaumont in Batman: Mask of the Phantasm, Queen Ant in Antz), (d. 2025).
- April 29: Stanisława Celińska, Polish actress (Polish dub voice of Ursula in The Little Mermaid, Morgana in The Little Mermaid II: Return to the Sea, Mama Odie in The Princess and the Frog), (d. 2026).

=== May ===
- May 8: Greg Finley, American voice actor (Captain Gloval and Anatole Leonard in Robotech franchise), (d. 2024).
- May 10: Marion Ramsey, American actress and singer (voice of D.I. Holler in The Addams Family, Laverne Hooks and Teacher in the Robot Chicken episode "Sausage Fest"), (d. 2021).
- May 13: Edgar Burcksen, Dutch editor (The Betty Boop Movie Mystery, Seabert), (d. 2024).
- May 16: Bill Smitrovich, American actor (voice of Ronny Boxer and Frank Watt in Batman Beyond, Daredevil in the Fantastic Four episode "And a Blind Man Shall Lead Them").
- May 29: Anthony Geary, American actor (voice of John and Juan in Teacher's Pet), (d. 2025).

=== June ===
- June 3: Shuki Levy, Israeli-American composer (DIC Entertainment, Ruby-Spears Enterprises, He-Man and the Masters of the Universe, She-Ra: Princess of Power) and producer (co-founder of Saban Entertainment).
- June 6: Robert Englund, American actor (voice of Felix Faust in Justice League and Justice League Unlimited, Anti-Pops in Regular Show, Vulture in The Spectacular Spider-Man, Riddler in The Batman, Pluto in the Hulk and the Agents of S.M.A.S.H. episode "The Tale of Hercules", Myglom in the Green Lantern: The Animated Series episode "Razer's Edge", Dormammu in The Super Hero Squad Show episode "Enter: Dormammu!", Ringmaster in the Super Robot Monkey Team Hyperforce Go! episode "Circus of Ooze").
- June 16: Tom Wyner, American voice actor (voice of Grimlock in Transformers: Robots in Disguise, Inspector Blooper in The New Adventures of Gigantor, Roman and Weitre in Vampire Hunter D, Jonathan Wolfe in the Robotech franchise, Thugmeister and Jagi Thug in Fist of the North Star, Legato in Windaria, Puppet Master in the Ghost in the Shell franchise, Quent Yaiden in Wolf's Rain), (d. 2024).
- June 17: Brothers Quay, American stop-motion animators.
- June 21: Michael Gross, American actor (voice of Don in Dan Vs., Lloyd Ventrix in the Batman: The Animated Series episode "See No Evil", Warren McGinnis in the Batman Beyond episode "Rebirth").
- June 22:
  - David Lander, American actor and comedian (voice of Smart Ass the Weasel in Who Framed Roger Rabbit, Doc-Boy Arbuckle in A Garfield Christmas Special and The Garfield Show, Horace Badun in 101 Dalmatians: The Series, Arthur in Jungle Cubs, Thumper in A Bug's Life, Squiggy in The Simpsons episode "Helter Shelter", Jerry Lewis in Will the Real Jerry Lewis Please Sit Down, Nitro in the Batman: The Animated Series episode "Appointment in Crime Alley", Henry in Oswald, Brian and Curtis in The Grim Adventures of Billy & Mandy, Les in Hopeless Pictures, Leonard Weems in Recess, Milo de Venus in Galaxy High School, Ch'p in Green Lantern: First Flight, Glam-Vampire Member in The Problem Solverz episode "Glam-Vampire Hunterz", Donnie the Shark in the SpongeBob SquarePants episode "Sharks vs. Pods" Sqweek in the Superman: The Animated Series episode "The Main Man", the title character in the Hey Arnold! episode "The Sewer King"), (d. 2020).
  - Howard Kaylan, American retired musician and songwriter (Down and Dirty Duck, Strawberry Shortcake, Peter and the Magic Egg, The Adventures of the American Rabbit).
- June 24: Peter Weller, American actor (voice of Batman in Batman: The Dark Knight Returns, Sergeant Hardcop in JJ Villard's Fairy Tales, Dr. Stern in Moon Girl and Devil Dinosaur).
- June 26: Robert Siegel, American retired radio journalist (voice of Diana's Ringtone in the BoJack Horseman episode "Thoughts and Prayers", himself in The Simpsons episode "Opposites A-Frack").
- June 29: Richard Lewis, American actor and comedian (voice of Old Beggar in the Happily Ever After: Fairy Tales for Every Child episode "The Golden Goose", Richard in the Dr. Katz, Professional Therapist episode "Undercover", Neurosis in the Hercules episode "Hercules and the Tiff on Olympus", the Golem in The Simpsons episode "Treehouse of Horror XVII", Buddy in the Pound Puppies episode "Rebel Without a Collar", Ziggy Abler in the BoJack Horseman episode "Head in the Clouds"), (d. 2024).

=== July ===
- July 2: Larry David, American comedian, writer and actor (voiced himself in the TripTank episode "Roy & Ben's Day Off").
- July 22: Albert Brooks, American actor, comedian and filmmaker (voice of Mickey Barnes and Kip Chogi in Hot Wheels, Hank Scorpio, Cowboy Bob, Jacques, Brad Goodman, Tab Spangler, Dr. Raufbold and Music Manager in The Simpsons, Marlin in Finding Nemo and Finding Dory, Russ Cargill in The Simpsons Movie, The Businessman in The Little Prince, Tiberius in The Secret Life of Pets).
- July 24: Robert Hays, American actor (voice of Iron Man in Iron Man, The Incredible Hulk, and Spider-Man, Edward Lytener/Luminus in Superman: The Animated Series, Reed Daley in An American Tail: The Mystery of the Night Monster, Squeak in The Nutcracker and the Mouse King).
- July 26: Julio Fernández Rodríguez, Spanish film producer (El Cid: The Legend, Pinocchio 3000, El Ratón Pérez, Nocturna, Donkey Xote), (d. 2025).
- July 28: Sally Struthers, American actress (voice of Pebbles Flintstone in The Pebbles and Bamm-Bamm Show, Rebecca Cunningham in TaleSpin).
- July 30:
  - Arnold Schwarzenegger, Austrian-American actor, film producer, businessman, former bodybuilder and 38th governor of California (voice of Baron Friedrich von Steuben in Liberty's Kids, Arnold Armstrong/Captain Fantastic in Superhero Kindergarten, Game Show Host in the Little Demon episode "Everybody's Dying For the Weekend").
  - William Atherton, American actor (voice of Doctor Destiny in the Justice League episode "Only a Dream").

=== August ===
- August 5: Larry Kenney, American voice actor (voice of Lion-O in ThunderCats, Jaga in ThunderCats Roar, the Chief in Teen Titans Go!, Count Chocula in commercials for Monster Cereals, Sonny the Cuckoo Bird in ads for Cocoa Puffs).
- August 11: Amanda McBroom, American singer-songwriter (The Land Before Time), and actress.
- August 13: John Stocker, Canadian voice actor and director (voice of Toad in The Super Mario Bros. Super Show! and The Adventures of Super Mario Bros. 3, Beastly in The Care Bears Family, Thompson in The Adventures of Tintin, Fungus in Stunt Dawgs, Graydon Creed and Leech in X-Men: The Animated Series, Newton Gimmick in The Adventures of Teddy Ruxpin, Gun Grinder in Jayce and the Wheeled Warriors, Bugsy Vile in Dog City, Ultron in The Avengers: United They Stand).
- August 20: Ray Wise, American actor (voice of Perry White in Superman: Doomsday, Jim Gordon in Batman: The Killing Joke, Plunch Runch in the Hot Streets episode "The Moon Master").
- August 22:
  - Barbara Pyle, American producer, filmmaker and environmental activist (co-creator of Captain Planet and the Planeteers).
  - Cindy Williams, American actress and producer (voice of Shirley Feeney in Laverne & Shirley in the Army, Gerri Poveri in The Magic School Bus episode "Ups and Downs"), (d. 2023).
  - Tibor Hernádi, Hungarian animator, film director, producer, screenwriter and storyboard artist (Felix the Cat: The Movie, The Seventh Brother, made various Red Bull animated TV commercials), (d. 2012).
- August 28: Alice Playten, American voice actress (voice of Gloria in Heavy Metal, Baby Lickety-Split and Baby Moondancer in Generation 1 of My Little Pony, Poindexter in Felix the Cat: The Movie, Beebe Bluff in Doug), (d. 2011).
- August 29: Arthur Burghardt, American actor (voice of Destro in G.I. Joe: A Real American Hero, Devastator in The Transformers, Turbo in Challenge of the GoBots, Pete in The Prince and the Pauper).
- August 31:
  - Mona Marshall, American voice actress (voice of Inari in Naruto, Izzy Izumi in the Digimon franchise, the title character in Doraemon, Mokey in Fraggle Rock: The Animated Series, Sylvia Sundew in Amphibia, Betty Brant in Spider-Man, various characters in South Park).
  - Steve Perry, American television writer (Gargoyles, Batman: The Animated Series).

=== September ===
- September 6:
  - Jane Curtin, American actress and comedian (voice of Prymaat in Coneheads, Muffy in Antz, Algid Bunk in Howard Lovecraft and the Frozen Kingdom, Hippolyte in the Hercules episode "Hercules and the Girdle of Hippolyte", Mrs. Clemperer in the Recess episode "Wild Child", Lady Ada Lovelace in the Cyberchase episode "Hugs and Witches").
  - Keone Young, American actor (voice of Ishiyama in Ben 10, Mr. Negative in Ultimate Spider-Man, Luiong Lao Shi in American Dragon: Jake Long, Silver Samurai in Wolverine and the X-Men, Storm Shadow in G.I. Joe: A Real American Hero, Wu-Chang in Sofia the First, Jun Sato in Star Wars Rebels, Dr. Ho in Batman Beyond, Mr. Wu in The Mighty B!, Kaz in Hi Hi Puffy AmiYumi, Jeong Jeong and Captain Li in Avatar: The Last Airbender, Wu Yong in Kung Fu Panda: Legends of Awesomeness, Kojiro Sasaki and Guan Yu in Record of Ragnarok, Kamahachi in Star Wars: Visions).
- September 14: Sam Neill, New Zealand actor, director, producer and screenwriter (voice of Sam Sawnoff in The Magic Pudding, Allomere in Legend of the Guardians: The Owls of Ga'Hoole, Frankie Scales in Daisy Quokka: World's Scariest Animal, Dr. Maybe in Scarygirl, Tommy Brock in Peter Rabbit and Peter Rabbit 2: The Runaway, Molloy in The Simpsons episode "Homer the Vigilante", Monogatron Leader in the Rick and Morty episode "The Old Man and the Seat"), (d. 2026).
- September 20: Steve Gerber, American writer, (Thundarr the Barbarian, Dungeons & Dragons, G.I. Joe: A Real American Hero, The Transformers, Superman: The Animated Series), (d. 2008).
- September 23: Mary Kay Place, American actress (voice of the Narrator in My Father's Dragon, Nancy in The Wild Thornberrys episode "Birthday Quake").
- September 27: Meat Loaf, American rock singer and actor (voiced himself in the South Park episode "Chef Aid"), (d. 2022).
- September 29:
  - Hubert Gagnon, Canadian voice actor (dub voice of Optimus Prime in Transformers, and Homer Simpson and Grampa Simpson in The Simpsons), (d. 2020).
  - Greg Irons, American underground cartoonist, animator, poster- and tattoo artist (Yellow Submarine), (d. 1984).
- September 30: Haunani Minn, American actress (voice of Cinnamon Teal and Sen-Sen in DuckTales, Mrs. Lee and Dr. Dihn in Clifford the Big Red Dog, Dr. Lee in the Batman: The Animated Series episode "Blind as a Bat", Mrs. Kim in the Static Shock episode "Tantrum"), (d. 2014).

=== October ===
- October 1:
  - Stephen Collins, American former actor (voice of Tony Maychek / Earthmover in the Batman Beyond episode "Earth Mover", Howard Stark in the Avengers Assemble episode "Thanos Rising").
  - Carolyn Seymour, English actress (voice of Kara In-Ze in the Superman: The Animated Series episode "Little Girl Lost", Agent B in The Replacements episode "London Calling", Moira in The Legend of Prince Valiant episode "The Princess Aleta", Sarah in The Real Adventures of Jonny Quest episode "The Spectre of the Pine Barrens").
- October 6: Han Peekel, Dutch comics scholar, singer, and TV presenter (Wordt Vervolgd), (d. 2022).
- October 12: Julie McWhirter, American retired voice actress and impressionist (voice of the title character in Jeannie, Bubbles in Jabberjaw, Casper the Friendly Ghost in Casper and the Angels, Vampira in Drak Pack, Huckleberry Pie in Strawberry Shortcake, Kanga in Winnie the Pooh and a Day For Eeyore, Baby Smurf and Sassette Smurf in The Smurfs, Betty Rubble in The Jetsons Meet the Flintstones).
- October 17:
  - Michael McKean, American actor, comedian, screenwriter, musician, and member of Spinal Tap (voice of Cecil in Jungle Cubs, Jasper Badun in 101 Dalmatians: The Series, Johnny Stitches in Hey Arnold!, Sarousch in The Hunchback of Notre Dame II, Lou Pickles in Rugrats, Argyle in My Little Pony: A New Generation, Evelyn Throckmorton in Harvey Birdman, Attorney at Law, Bartholomew Wolper in Batman: The Dark Knight Returns, Uncle Humidor in The 7D, Mr. Locks in Goldie & Bear, David St. Hubbins, Arthur Fortune and Jerry Rude in The Simpsons, Bob Hiney in the Duckman episode "A Civil War", Jeffrey Otitus in the Road Rovers episode "Reigning Cats and Dogs", King Raymond in the Johnny Bravo episode "Jungle Boy in Mr. Monkeyman", L.G. Algae in The Angry Beavers episode "Pond Scum", 1950s Joker in The New Batman Adventures episode "Legends of the Dark Knight", Ian Peek in the Batman Beyond episode "Sneak Peek", Bobby Lightfoot in the As Told by Ginger episode "Family Therapy", Sgt. O'Shaughnessey in the Justice League episode "Legends", Kalgoron in The Grim Adventures of Billy & Mandy episode "Wrath of the Spider Queen", Vultaire in the ThunderCats episode "What Lies Above", Emperor Zing in the American Dad! episode "Lost in Space").
  - Karel Heřmánek, Czech Actor (Czech dub voice of Hercules in Spiff and Hercules, Gill in Finding Nemo, Django in Ratatouille, Black Wolf in The Flight Before Christmas, Max Horowiz in Mary and Max, Uncle Topolino in Cars 2, King Fergus in Brave, Jake in Free Birds, Julius Caesar in Asterix: The Mansions of the Gods, Xibalba in The Book of Life), (d. 2024).
- October 23: Trixie Flynn, American production assistant (The Simpsons, The Critic), (d. 2022).
- October 24: Kevin Kline, American actor (voice of Phoebus in The Hunchback of Notre Dame and The Hunchback of Notre Dame II, Tulio in The Road to El Dorado, Andre in The Tale of Despereaux, Calvin Fischoeder in Bob's Burgers).
- October 29: Richard Dreyfuss, American actor (voice of Mr. Centipede in James and the Giant Peach, Scoop in Rudolph the Red-Nosed Reindeer and the Island of Misfit Toys, Captain Acrab in the Bubble Guppies episode "The Jaw-some Sharkventure!", himself in the Family Guy episodes "Three Kings" and "Peter-assment").
- October 30: Herschel Weingrod, American screenwriter (Space Jam).

=== November ===
- November 3: Joe Lala, American musician and actor (voice of Mr. Estevez in The Adventures of Jimmy Neutron, Boy Genius, Hector's Dad in Ozzy & Drix, Enrique in the All Grown Up! episode "Dude, Where's My Horse?", Leonardo da Vinci in the Time Squad episode "Daddio DaVinci", additional voices in Monsters, Inc., The Twisted Tales of Felix the Cat, and The Legend of Calamity Jane), (d. 2014).
- November 4: Toshiyuki Nishida, Japanese actor (voice of Koichi Tabuchi in There Goes Our Hero, The Heat of the Pennant Race and After the Ball Game, Iwa in A Letter to Momo, Japanese dub voice of Bigweld in Robots), (d. 2024).
- November 9: Robert David Hall, American actor (voice of Dinky Little in The Littles, Colonel Sharp in G.I. Joe: A Real American Hero, Azmuth in Ben 10).
- November 13: Joe Mantegna, American actor, producer and director (voice of Fat Tony in The Simpsons, Rube Richter in Duckman, Monty in The Trumpet of the Swan, Crooner in Justice League: The New Frontier, Grem in Cars 2, Jack Montello and Diner 2 in the Rugrats episode "Looking for Jack", Jimmy Blamhammer in the Kim Possible episode "And the Mole Rat Will Be CGI").
- November 17: Will Vinton, American animator and film director (The Adventures of Mark Twain, The California Raisins), (d. 2018).
- November 24: Dwight Schultz, American actor (voice of Dr. Animo in the Ben 10 franchise, Mung Daal in Chowder, Eddie in CatDog, Attuma in Avengers Assemble and Ultimate Spider-Man, Mad Hatter in the Young Justice episode "Triptych").
- November 25:
  - Jeff Doucette, American actor (voice of Thumbskull in Ben 10, Pango in Robinson Crusoe, Glenn in My Life as a Teenage Robot, Smeck in God, the Devil and Bob, Ivan the Unbearable and Olaf in the Random! Cartoons episode "Ivan the Unbearable").
  - Tracey Walter, American actor (voice of Puppet King in the Teen Titans episode "Switched", Mophir in the Justice League episode "Eclipsed").
  - John Larroquette, American actor (voice of Tomar-Re in Green Lantern: First Flight, Mirror Master in The Batman, Uncle Bob in Phineas and Ferb).

=== December ===
- December 4: Robert J. Walsh, American film and television composer (Looney Tunes, Marvel Productions), (d. 2018).
- December 11: David E. Stone, American sound editor (Hanna-Barbera, DisneyToon Studios).
- December 17: Wes Studi, American actor (voice of Counselor Jerry C in Soul, Windlifter in Planes: Fire & Rescue, Hawk Feather in the SuperMansion episode "Puss in Books", Scarface in the Adventures from the Book of Virtues episode "Perseverance").
- December 29: Ted Danson, American actor (voice of Sean's Dad in The Magic 7, Pezulu in Jock the Hero Dog, Dr. Ray Petit in American Dad!, Sam Malone in The Simpsons episode "Fear of Flying", Terry McMillian in the Gary the Rat episode "Mergers and Acquisitions", Tom Hammond in the King of the Hill episode "The Accidental Terrorist").
- December 31: Tim Matheson, American actor (voice of the title character in Jonny Quest, Jace in Space Ghost, Samson in Samson & Goliath, Brad Chiles in Scooby-Doo! Mystery Incorporated, the President in Tom and Jerry: Spy Quest, Captain John O'Rourke in The Legend of Calamity Jane, Gil Mason in the Batman: The Animated Series episode "Shadow of the Bat", Maxwell Lord in the Justice League Unlimited episode "Ultimatum", Jarvis Kord in the Batman: The Brave and the Bold episode "Fall of the Blue Beetle!").

=== Specific date unknown ===
- Patrick Loubert, Canadian producer, director, screenwriter and storyboard artist (co-founder of Nelvana).

== Deaths ==
=== January ===
- January 3: Gus Wickie, German-American singer and actor (voice of Bluto in Popeye), dies at age 61.
- January 9: Herman Bing, German-American actor (voice of the Ringmaster in Dumbo), dies at age 57.

=== March ===
- March 24: Frank Fiegel, American tramp and bar bouncer (inspiration for Popeye), dies at age 79.

=== June ===
- June 18: Anna Caulfield McKnight, American traveler, lecturer on art and travel, and businesswoman, (her lectures used magic lantern slides which were taken on her travels, and made her a well-known lecturer in her time), dies at age 80.

== See also ==
- List of anime by release date (1946–1959)
