= Polly =

Polly is a given name, most often feminine, which originated as a variant of Molly (a diminutive of Mary). Polly may also be a short form of names such as Polina, Polona, Pauline, Paula, or Paulina.

== People ==
=== Female ===
==== Given name ====
- PJ Harvey (born 1969), English singer/songwriter
- Polly Apfelbaum (born 1955), American contemporary visual artist
- Polly Arnold (born 1972), British academic
- Polly Baca (born 1941), American politician
- Polly Bartlett, American serial killer, perhaps fictitious
- Polly Barton, American textile artist
- Polly Bemis (1853–1933), Chinese-American pioneer
- Polly Bennett (1922–2003), American artist
- Polly Berry (c. 1818–c. 1870–1880), also known as Polly Crockett and Polly Wash, African-American slave who successfully sued for her freedom and that of her daughter
- Polly Borland (born 1959), Australian photographer
- Polly Bradfield (fl. 1977–1986), American violinist
- Polly Brown (born 1947), English singer
- Polly Campion, American politician
- Polly Draper (born 1955), American actress, screenwriter, playwright, producer and director
- Polly Dunbar (born 1977), British author and illustrator
- Polly Emery (1875–1958), British actress
- Polly Gage (1805–1882), namesake of Aunt Polly's Wash Tub
- Polly Granzow (born 1941), American politician
- Polly Guerin (died 2021), American writer
- Polly Harrar, British women's rights activist
- Polly Hill (economist) (1914–2005), British economic historian
- Polly Holliday (1937–2025), American actress
- Polly Horvath (born 1957), Canadian author
- Polly Irungu, Kenyan-American photographer and journalist
- Polly James (broadcaster) (born 1986 or 1987), Welsh radio and television presenter
- Polly James (screenwriter) (fl. 1940s–1950s), American screen writer
- Polly Klaas (1981–1993), American teen murder victim
- Polly Maberly (born 1976), English actress
- Polly Matzinger (born 1947), French immunologist
- Polly Allen Mellen (1924–2024), American stylist and fashion editor for Harper's Bazaar and Vogue
- Polly Nelson (born 1952), American attorney and author
- Polly Pattullo, British author, journalist, editor and publisher
- Polly Paulusma (born 1976), English singer-songwriter
- Polly Renton (1970–2010), British documentary film maker
- Polly Riley (1926–2002), American amateur golfer
- Polly Samson (born 1962), English journalist and writer
- Polly Scattergood (born 1986), English singer-songwriter
- Polly Shannon (born 1973), Canadian actress
- Pollie Hirst Simpson (1871–1947), English sportswoman, charity organiser and the first agricultural adviser to the National Federation of Women's Institutes (WI)
- Polly Smith (inventor), (born 1949), American costume designer, inventor of the sports bra
- Polly Stenham (born 1986), English playwright
- Polly Stockton (born 1973), British event (horse) rider
- Polly Swann (born 1988), British rower and world champion in the women's coxless pairs
- Polly Sy, Filipino mathematician
- Polly Teale (born 1962), British writer and theater director
- Polly Walker (born 1966), English actress
- Polly Ann Young (1908–1997), American actress, sister of Loretta Young
- Polly Young (1749–1799), English soprano, composer and keyboard player

==== Nickname ====
- Polly Adams (born 1939), English actress
- Polly Adler (1900–1962), Russian-born American madam and author
- Polly Bergen (1930–2014), American actress and singer
- Polly Craus (1923–2006), American fencer
- Polly Elwes (1928–1987), British television presenter and actress
- Polly Hill (horticulturist) (1907–2007), American horticulturist
- Polly Knipp Hill (1900–1990), American artist
- Polly James (born 1941), British actress
- Polly Lada-Mocarski (1902–1997), American bookbinder, inventor and rare book scholar
- Polly Marshall (1932–1995), English cricketer
- Polly Moran (1883–1952), American actress and comedian
- Polly Platt (1939–2011), American film producer, production designer and screenwriter
- Polly Powrie (born 1987), New Zealand sailor
- Polly Rosenbaum (1899–2003), American politician and teacher
- Polly Rowles (1914–2001), American actress
- Polly Shackleton (1910–1997), American politician
- Polly Smith (photographer) (1908–1980), American photographer
- Polly Toynbee (born 1946), British journalist and writer
- Polly Lauder Tunney (1907–2008), American philanthropist and socialite, wife of boxer Gene Tunney
- Polly Palfrey Woodrow (1906–1997), American tennis player

=== Male ===
- Bill Perkins (Australian rules footballer) (1920–2009), also known as Polly
- Graham Farmer (1935–2019), Australian rules football player and coach, nicknamed Polly
- Polly Umrigar (1926–2006), Indian cricketer
- Polly Wolfe (1888–1939), American Major League Baseball player

== Fictional characters ==
- Alfred Polly, title character of The History of Mr Polly, a novel by H. G. Wells
- Polly Becker, on the BBC soap opera EastEnders (1997–1998)
- Polly O'Keefe, protagonist or major character in four Madeleine L'Engle novels
- Polly Page, a police constable in British TV series The Bill
- Polly Plantar, a main character in the animated series Amphibia
- Polly Plummer, a main character in C. S. Lewis' novel The Magician's Nephew
- Polly Pocket, a main character in the Polly Pocket series
- Polly Prince, title character in the film Along Came Polly, played by Jennifer Aniston
- Polly (Underdog), full name Sweet Polly Purebread, in the American animated TV series Underdog
- Polly Sherman, waitress in the British sitcom Fawlty Towers, played by Connie Booth
- Polly (Doctor Who}, in the British science fiction television series Doctor Who, a companion of the First and Second Doctors

== See also ==
- Polly (disambiguation)
- Poly (disambiguation)
- Pollyanna (disambiguation)
- Polly Perkins (disambiguation)
- Pretty Polly (disambiguation)
