= Poly =

Poly, from the Greek πολύς meaning "many" or "much", may refer to:

== Businesses ==
- China Poly Group Corporation, a Chinese business group, and its subsidiaries:
  - Poly Property, a Hong Kong incorporated Chinese property developer
  - Poly Real Estate, a Chinese real estate developer
  - Poly Technologies, a defense manufacturing company
- Plantronics, previously d/b/a Poly, an American communications technology company

== People ==
- Poly (footballer) (1906–1986), full name Policarpo Ribeiro de Oliveira, Brazilian footballer
- Natasha Poly (born 1985), stage name of Russian supermodel Natalya Sergeyevna Polevshchikova
- Poly Styrene (1957–2011), stage name of British musician Marianne Joan Elliott-Said
- Poly Ugarte (born 1959), Ecuadorian politician
- Poly Varghese (born 1972), Indian musician

== Polytechnic ==
- Hong Kong Polytechnic University, locally known as Poly
- Polytechnic Heights, Fort Worth, Texas, neighborhood locally known as Poly
- Polytechnic Institute of NYU (now New York University Tandon School of Engineering), locally known as Poly
- The Rensselaer Polytechnic, also known as The Poly, the student newspaper of Rensselaer Polytechnic Institute, Troy, New York
- Royal Cornwall Polytechnic Society, a UK charity commonly known as "The Poly"
- Informal term for a Polytechnic (United Kingdom), type of tertiary educational institution

== Other uses ==
- Poly (website), a website by Google
- Polynesian, often shortened to poly, as in ‘Poly people are also called “Pasifika” or “Tangata Moana” (people of the ocean)’
- Polyamory, often shortened to poly, as in 'poly relationship'
- Polyethylene, often shortened to poly, as in 'poly gloves'
- Polyspheric or Poly, lower-cost V8 engines produced by Chrysler from 1955 to 1958
- Storm Poly, a European windstorm in 2023

== See also ==
- Poly-1, a 1980s desktop computer designed in New Zealand for educational use
- Warren CP-1, also called Miss Poly, a 1929 aircraft built by engineering students at California Polytechnic College
- Polly (disambiguation)
- Polygon (disambiguation)
