= Pollyanna (disambiguation) =

Pollyanna is a best-selling 1913 novel by Eleanor H. Porter. As a feminine given name, Pollyanna is derived from the name Polly combined with the name Anna.

Pollyanna may also refer to:

== People ==
- Pollyanna Chu, billionaire businesswoman from Hong Kong
- Pollyana Papel (born 1987), a Brazilian singer, songwriter and actress
- Pollyanna Pickering (1942–2018), British wildlife artist and environmentalist
- Pollyanna Woodward (born 1982), English TV presenter
- Britt Pols, vocalist who performs under the name PollyAnna on songs by Timmy Trumpet and Steve Aoki

=== Fictional characters ===
- Pollyanna Whittier, the titular character from the 1913 Eleanor Porter novel Pollyanna

== Entertainment ==
=== Stage ===
- Pollyanna (play), a 1916 Broadway play adapted from the novel.

=== Film ===
- Pollyanna (1920 film), an adaptation of the novel, starring Mary Pickford
- Pollyanna (1960 film), an adaptation of the novel, starring Hayley Mills

=== Music ===
- Pollyanna (album), the second studio album by emo band Northstar
- Pollyanna (band), an Australian band

==== Songs ====
- "Pollyanna (I Believe In You)", a recurring song in Mother, a Nintendo role-playing video game series
- "Pollyanna", a song by Billy Joe Royal off his 1965 album, Down in the Boondocks
- "Pollyanna", a 2021 single by American punk rock band Green Day
- "Pollyanna Flower", a 1998 song recorded by Canadian alt rock singer-songwriter Alanis Morissette

== Other uses ==
- Pollyanna Creep, a term implying overly optimistic presentation of economic measurements by government
- Pollyanna principle, the tendency to remember pleasant events and forget unpleasant ones
- USS Pollyanna, a U.S. Navy ship name
  - USS Pollyanna (SP-1048), a United States Navy patrol boat in commission from 1917 to 1919
- Secret Santa, a Western holiday tradition referred to in Pennsylvania as Pollyanna
- A reindeer which served as the mascot of submarine HMS Trident (N52)

== See also ==
- Anna (disambiguation)
- Polly (disambiguation)
