= Polley =

Polley may refer to:

== Places ==
Canada

- Mount Polley mine, Canadian gold and copper mine

United States

- Polley, Wisconsin

== Surname ==
- Dale Polley (born 1965), baseball player
- Eugene Polley (died 2012), inventor of the first wireless remote control
- George Polley (1898–1927), American pioneer of (the then-unnamed act of) buildering, or climbing the walls of tall buildings
- Gerald Polley (1947–2012), American singer and animator
- Gertrude Polley (1900–1982), British co-operative activist
- Horace N. Polley (1842–1914), American politician
- Helen Polley (born 1957), Australian politician
- Jacob Polley (born 1975), British poet
- Jill Polley, English international lawn and indoor bowler
- Margaret Polley (died 1555), English martyr
- Michael Polley (born 1949), Australian politician
- Michael Polley (footballer) (born 1976), Australian rules footballer
- Nora Polley (1894–1988), Indian tennis player
- Prince Polley (born 1969), Ghanaian footballer
- Robin Polley (born 1998), Ghanaian footballer
- Samuel C. Polley (1864–1949), South Dakota lawyer, politician, and judge
- Sarah Polley (born 1979), Canadian actress, singer, film director and screenwriter
- Sean Polley (born 1981), English cricketer
- Shaunna Polley (born 1993), New Zealand beach volleyball player
- Stan Polley (died 2009), entertainment manager from the 1960s and 1970s
- Teresa S. Polley, president and chief operating officer of the Financial Accounting Foundation
- Tommy Polley (born 1978), American football player
- Tyler Polley (born 1999), American basketball player
- Vivian Polley (1880–1967), English cricketer

== Court cases ==
- Polleys v. Black River Improvement Co. (1885)

== See also ==
- Polly (disambiguation)
