= Polly (disambiguation) =

Polly is a female given name.

Polly may also refer to:

== Arts and entertainment ==
=== Films ===
- Polly (film), a 1989 television musical adaptation of the book Pollyanna, starring Keshia Knight Pulliam and Phylicia Rashad

=== Literature ===
- Polly (novel), by Freya North (1998)
- Polly, a romantic novel by Marion Chesney (1980)
- Polly, by Douglas Goldring (1917)
- Polly, a Mills & Boon novel by Betty Neels (1984)
- Polly, by Jennie Tremaine (1987)

=== Music ===
- Polly (opera), a 1729 opera, sequel to The Beggar's Opera
- "Polly", a 1959 jazz song by Duke Ellington
- "Polly" (The Kinks song), 1968
- "Polly", a 1969 song by Dillard & Clark from Through the Morning, Through the Night
- "Polly" (Nirvana song), written by Kurt Cobain (1991)
- "Polly", a 2019 song by Moses Sumney from Græ
- "Polly Wolly Doodle", Children's song from 1843
- "Polly Vaughn", Irish folk song

== People ==
- Matthew Polly (born 1971), American author
- Polly Perkins, British actress, singer and writer born Gillian Nessie Arnold in 1943
- Polly Ward (1912–1987), British singer and actress born Byno Poluski

== Ships ==
- Polly (brig), an American sailing ship that was damaged in a hurricane in 1811 and drifted for six months
- USS Polly (SP-690), a United States Navy patrol vessel in commission from 1917 to 1919

== Other uses ==
- Polly (peanut), a Norwegian peanut snack brand
- Polly and Molly, genetically engineered sheep
- 5278 Polly, an asteroid
- Polly Dome
- Poll (parrot), nicknamed Polly, the pet parrot of US president Andrew Jackson

== See also ==
- Polley (disambiguation)
- Poly (disambiguation)
- Polly Perkins (disambiguation)
- Pretty Polly (disambiguation)
