= Sy =

Sy is a given name, nickname/hypocorism (often of Seymour) and surname which may refer to:

== Surname ==
=== In arts and entertainment ===
- Brigitte Sy (born 1956), French actress and filmmaker
- Latyr Sy (born 1972), Senegalese singer and percussionist
- Leïla Sy (born 1977), French director
- Omar Sy (born 1978), French actor and comedian
- Oumou Sy (born 1952), Senegalese fashion designer

=== In sports ===
- Amara Sy (born 1981), Malian-French basketball player
- Baba Sy (1935–1978), Senegalese draughts player, first world champion from Africa
- Cheikha Sy (born 1990), Senegalese footballer
- Founéké Sy (born 1986), Malian footballer
- Moussa Sy, Guinean football player
- Pape Sy (basketball) (born 1988), French basketball player
- Pape Sy (footballer) (born 1997), Senegalese footballer
- Bandja Sy (born 1990), Malian-French basketball player

=== In politics ===
- Chan Sy (1932–1984), Cambodian politician, Prime Minister of the People's Republic of Kampuchea from 1981 to 1984
- Ousmane Sy (born 1949), Malian politician
- Seydina Oumar Sy (born 1937), Senegalese politician, Foreign Minister of Senegal from 1990 to 1991

=== In other fields ===
- Frédéric Sy, 19th and 20th century French astronomer
- Henry Sy (1924–2019), Chinese-Filipino billionaire, business magnate, investor and philanthropist
- Malick Sy (1855–1922), Senegalese Muslim religious leader and teacher
- Polly Sy, Filipino mathematician

== Given name or nickname ==
=== In arts and entertainment ===
- Sy Barry (born 1928), American comic-book and comic-strip artist best known for his work on the strip The Phantom
- Sy Gomberg (1918–2001), American film screenwriter and producer
- Sy Montgomery (born 1958), German-American naturalist, author and scriptwriter
- Sy Oliver (1910–1988), American jazz arranger, trumpeter, composer, singer and bandleader
- Sy Richardson (born 1941), American actor
- Sy Smith (born 1978), American R&B/soul singer
- Sy Wexler (1916–2005), American documentary filmmaker

=== In business ===
- Sy Berger (1923–2014), Topps company employee considered the father of the modern baseball card
- Sy Syms (1926–2009), American businessman, entrepreneur and philanthropist
- Seymour G. Sternberg (born 1943), chairman and former CEO of New York Life Insurance Company

=== In sports ===
- Sylvester Blye (born 1938), American basketball player
- Seymour Cromwell (1934–1977), American rower
- Sy Sanborn (1866–1934), American sportswriter
- Sy Sutcliffe (1862–1893), American baseball player

=== In other fields ===
- Sy Friedman (born 1953), American-Austrian mathematician and professor
- Seymour Hersh (born 1937), American investigative journalist and political writer
- Seymour Liebergot (born 1936), retired NASA flight controller
- Sy Montgomery (born 1958), German-American naturalist, author and scriptwriter

== In fiction ==
- Sy Snootles, a Star Wars character
- Sy Bisti, a fictional language in the Star Wars universe
- Sy Ableman, a character from A Serious Man
- Sy Rubinek, a character from Sneaky Pete
- Seymour "Sy" Parrish, a character from One Hour Photo

== See also ==
- Shī (surname) (施)
- Shǐ (surname) (史)
- Psy, a South Korean rapper
- Sy, Belgium, a town in Belgium
