= Video from Hell =

1987 film by Frank Zappa

- Directed by: Frank Zappa; Bruce Bickford (animated sequences)
- Written by: Frank Zappa
- Produced by: Jill Silverthorne
- Starring: Kyle Richards; Frank Zappa
- Music by: Frank Zappa
- Distributed by: 3G home video
- Release date: 1987
- Running time: 60 minutes
- Country: United States
- Language: English

Video from Hell is a video (VHS only, no Betamax was made available) released in 1987 by Frank Zappa. It is a compilation of pieces from a series of video projects by Zappa, some of which did receive full release - including Baby Snakes, Uncle Meat and The True Story of Frank Zappa's 200 Motels - and some which remain unreleased or unfinished, including a companion video for the You Can't Do That On Stage Anymore series of albums. Many pieces from this video had appeared on a one-hour Night Flight special entitled "You Are What You Watch". The music video for the song "G-Spot Tornado" features color 8mm footage that Zappa shot at a county fair in the early 1960s. The music video for "You Are What You Is", which was banned by MTV, is also included, as is footage of a 1982 live guitar solo duet between Zappa and Steve Vai taken from the song "Stevie's Spanking", the audio of which was later released on You Can't Do That On Stage Anymore, Vol. 4. Video from Hell has not been released on DVD.

Titled similarly to 1986's Jazz from Hell instrumental album, the title is explained as a political reference by Zappa: "Things in America can be from hell. Right now we have a president from hell [Reagan], and a National Security Council from hell, so we should add Jazz from Hell also."
