= The Torture Never Stops =

The Torture Never Stops may refer to:

- "The Torture Never Stops" (song), a 1976 song by Frank Zappa
- The Torture Never Stops (video), a 2008 live video by Frank Zappa
