= The Strange Awakening of Lazy Smurf =

Fifteenth album in the series The Smurfs

The Strange Awakening of Lazy Smurf (L'Étrange Réveil du Schtroumpf paresseux)
- Cover of the French-language version
- Creator: Peyo
- Date: April 1991
- Series: The Smurfs
- Page count: 44 pages
- Publisher: Le Lombard

Original publication
- Language: French

Chronology
- Preceded by: The Aerosmurf (1990)
- Followed by: Finance Smurf (1992)

The Strange Awakening of Lazy Smurf (original French title: L'Étrange Réveil du Schtroumpf Paresseux) is the fifteenth album of the original French-language Smurfs comic series created by Belgian artist Peyo.

Apart from the titular one, it contains other four stories: The Smurfs' Little Train, The Smurf and his Dragon, The Firemen Smurfs and A Mole among the Smurfs.

== Plots ==
=== The Strange Awakening of Lazy Smurf ===
After Lazy Smurf falls asleep painting his own house, the Smurfs decide to play a joke on him; they add fake webs, dust and cracks to the whole village, so when Lazy Smurf awakens, he believes he's been asleep for several years. He finds the Smurfs, who have disguised to look old, save for Papa Smurf, who just tells that changes aren't so noticeable after a certain age, and another Smurf who pretends to be a grown Baby Smurf. Since everybody is old, Lazy Smurf must do all the chores. After some hard work, Lazy Smurf overhears a conversation that reveals the charade. Then, during dinner, Lazy Smurf reveals that, reading Papa Smurf's book, he found a formula to rejuvenate a hundred years and added it to the food. Lazy Smurf secretly tells Papa Smurf it isn't true, but the worried Smurfs (who are exactly 100 years old, save for the even younger Smurfette, so the rejuvenation could kill them) seek for an aging formula in Gargamel's house. Gargamel returns shortly after they finish the formula, and just knowing the Smurfs were making an elixir for themselves, drinks it and becomes an old man. Lazy Smurf reveals his ruse and the Smurfs celebrate with a party at the Village, save for Lazy Smurf who is tired after all his hard work that day.

=== The Smurf's Little Train ===
The Smurfs bring provisions to the Village, and ask Handy Smurf for an invention that allows them to carry things in an easier way. Handy Smurf builds his invention in the forest while asking Hefty Smurf to guard it to keep the Smurfs from watching his work. When Handy Smurf finishes his invention, he reveals it: a locomosmurf to transport provisions. The job to build the rails falls on the other Smurfs. Gargamel finds the rails and tries to follow the locomotive, but a tunnel impedes it, and the tunnel is too long to Gargamel to find the other side. Gargamel then installs a detour rail so, when the Smurfs return, the detour sends them to Gargamel's house. Papa Smurf, who returns from Homnibus' house on a stork's back, watches it and frees the Smurfs. When escaping, the Smurfs create a new detour of the rails to make Gargamel run in circles around a tree while believing he's following the rails to the Smurf Village.

=== The Smurf and His Dragon ===
Every Smurf has a pet: Baby Smurf has Puppy, Natural Smurf has a caterpillar (who becomes a butterfly), Lazy Smurf has a marmot, Brainy Smurf has a very talkative mynah, Harmony Smurf has a tone-deaf nightingale, Handy Smurf has a beaver, and the Smurfette has silkworms that make her dresses. The only Smurf who doesn't have a pet is Timid Smurf, who is sad at the forest until he hears someone crying in a cave; it's a little fire-breathing dragon. Timid Smurf brings the dragon to the Smurf Village and names him Grumpf. Grumpf causes accidental disaster by stomping, eating or burning the other Smurfs' stuff, so Papa Smurf asks Timid Smurf to return Grumpf to the forest. When Timid Smurf and Grumpf arrive to the cave, they find two bigger dragons, Grumpf's parents, who make Timid Smurf run away. That night, there's a rain that causes an overflow in the dam, but Timid brings Grumpf and his family, who burn some rocks in the base of the dam to create a terracotta wall. Timid Smurf must still say farewell to Grumpf, since the Smurf Village isn't a place for a dragon and besides, Grumpf must stay with his parents. At the end, Timid Smurf gets bees as his new pets.

=== The Firemen Smurfs ===
Due to lack of needed equipment, the Smurfs don't manage to put out the fire of a bench, so they decide to organise as firemen in case of a really serious fire. Tailor Smurf makes the uniforms, while Handy Smurf builds both a pump vehicle and an alarm bell. Papa Smurf installs a weather vane he claims is magical. The firemen take their task very seriously: they put down a chimney fire (destroying a house in the process), they put down the fire of Handy Smurf's forge, they put down the fire of Papa Smurf's just-lit candle, and they even put down Poet Smurf's poem to the Smurfette because it claims his love is a flame. However, they cannot put down a barbecue fire because it's just outside the Smurf Village, so it's beyond their surveillance. Gargamel smells the barbecue and tries to follow it to the village, but he fails and, in anger, puts the forest in fire. While the firemen Smurfs try to put the fire down, Papa Smurf uses the magic weather vane to make wind that sends the fire towards Gargamel, and then some rain to put down the fire. A Smurf asks Papa Smurf who gave him the magic weather vane, and he answers it was a certain Aeolus.

=== A Mole among the Smurfs ===
Brainy Smurf falls victim of one of Jokey Smurf's explosive presents. When Brainy Smurf is washing his face, Jokey Smurf steals his glasses to pretend to be him, and Brainy Smurf trips everywhere in search of his glasses. Suddenly, there's what seems an earthquake, but it really is a mole. The mole escapes, but Papa Smurf, who wants to know why is the mole digging so random, follows him accompanied by Handy Smurf and Jokey Smurf (who he mistakes for Brainy Smurf), and the real Brainy Smurf also follows, in search of his glasses. The mole ends in front of Gargamel's house, and Gargamel, who hates moles, tries to throw him some petards. The Smurfs find out the mole's random digging is due to being myopic (even for a mole) and give him Brainy Smurf's glasses. The mole digs a new tunnel that allows him and the Smurfs to escape Gargamel's house, and they let him keep the glasses. Papa Smurf reassures to Brainy Smurf that Handy Smurf will make him new glasses, but when Brainy Smurf wants to ask if they are ready, he is so blind that he asks Chef Smurf instead.

== Publication and other media ==
- The main story of the book was made as an animated episode.
- Hefty Smurf acts as a guard in The Smurf's Little Train. He was guard captain in King Smurf.
