= Papel =

Papel means paper in Portuguese language

Papel may refer to:

- Pollyana Papel (born 1987), a Brazilian singer, songwriter and actress
- Papel people, an ethnic group from Guinea-Bissau
- The Papel language
