= The Dub Room Special! =

- Cover of original video release
- Cinematography: Thomas Nordegg
- Edited by: Terry W. Greene; Tim Clark (Dub Room editor)
- Music by: Frank Zappa
- Distributed by: Barfko-Swill (U.S. videocassette release); Eagle Vision (U.S. DVD release)
- Release date: 1982
- Running time: 90 minutes
- Country: United States
- Language: English

The Dub Room Special! is a direct-to-video production by American musician Frank Zappa made for release in October 1982. The video combines a performance at the KCET studios in Los Angeles on August 27, 1974 and two concerts performed at The Palladium, New York City on October 31, 1981 with clay animation by Bruce Bickford, interviews, and footage from the "Dub Room" at Compact Video.

== Background ==
The 1974 footage was originally conceived as part of the TV special A Token of His Extreme. The entire production was edited in the "Dub Room" at Compact Video, a post-production facility in Burbank, California. A few of the Compact Video staff members have brief appearances.

The initial videocassette edition was released in 1982 and was available only through Zappa's mail-order company, Barfko-Swill, which was also known by its Los Angeles phone number "818-PUMPKIN" (818-786-7546). The tape was produced in small quantities with a plain black and white typed label. Though it had a $49.98 price tag, it quickly sold out. The videocassette was sold in both VHS and Beta formats. Only the Beta version contained a stereo Hi-Fi soundtrack. The VHS version had a lower quality mono soundtrack because improved audio capability had not yet been introduced to the VHS tape format.

=== Reissues and related releases ===
The video was reissued on DVD on October 17, 2005 with some interview sections trimmed. In 2007 a soundtrack with the same name was released. A video of the 1981 concerts, The Torture Never Stops, was released on DVD in 2008, and the original 1976 A Token of His Extreme video was released on DVD in 2013.

== DVD track listing ==
1. "Kim?" / The Dog Breath Variations / Uncle Meat
2. Room Service
3. Nig Biz
4. Approximate
5. Cosmik Debris
6. Cocaine Decisions
7. "The Massimo Bassoli Instant Italian Lesson" / Montana
8. "In Case You Didn't Know..." / Tengo na minchia tanta
9. Florentine Pogen
10. Stevie's Spanking
11. Stink-Foot
12. Flakes
13. Inca Roads
14. E.Z. Meat
15. "Huh-Huh-Huh"

The following interview sections on the original videocassette version were cut from the DVD reissue:

- Zappa talking about Compact Video (originally preceded "Room Service")
- Intermission (after "Florentine Pogen") with title cards and Zappa talking about bad continuity

== Personnel ==
Note: all credits for The Torture Never Stops and A Token of His Extreme also apply here.

=== Cast ===
- Everybody from Compact Video and many other exciting persons

Including but not limited to...

- George Duke
- Ruth Underwood
- Chester Thompson
- Tom Fowler
- and Napoleon Murphy Brock

in legendary performances recorded August 1974

Other musical entertainment by...

- Tommy Mars
- Ed Mann
- Steve Vai
- Ray White
- Scott Thunes
- Bobby Martin
- Chad Wackerman

Along with...

- Massimo Bassoli (and his rubber chicken)

And, as if that weren't enough...

- The amazing clay animation of Bruce Bickford

=== Production ===
- Terry W. Greene – editor
- Tim Clark – Dub Room editor
- Thomas Haigh – assistant editor
- Thomas Nordegg – camera & Velcro
- Gary Barron – telecine
- Craig Latta – the guy who plugged it all in & made it work...
- Kim Thompson – post-production scheduling
- Dave Register – fixing things
- Jaime Vellve – layer-backer
- Bob "Lightning" Washburn – video stuff
- Charles "Smitty" Schmidt – stained glass
- Ron Menzies – handshake deal
- Kevin Buck – guy who doesn't like Zappa's music
- Bruce Ochnanek – cheap V.O.'s

==== DVD credits ====
The Program:

- Frank Zappa – producer, director, writer; music conductor, composer, arranger & performer

The Very Idea:

- Gail Zappa – DVD executive producer
- Joe Travers – vaultmeisterment & profound aggrandizement
- Ahmet Zappa – excitement & enthusiasm for this project and especially the ensuing soundtrack on CD
- Dweezil Zappa – thumbs up by guitar player
- Melanie Starks – Department of Completion
- Eric White – painting
- FZ – titles & apostrophe
- Joe Travers – screengrabs
- Diva Zappa – photos
- Tracy Veal, Creative Portal – package layout design

The Disc:

- Booey Kober, Kober Post – Digibeta transfers, color correction of Baby Snakes trailer, general charmingness
- Joe Travers – transport
- Steve Durgin – "Valley Girl Documentary"
  - Featuring FZ & Moon with appearances by Ahmet, Dweezil (& Steve Vai's strat), GZ and some fine pianists at Cal Arts, thankyou.
  - Richard Hart – host
  - Paul Colardo – camera
  - I.W. Harper – sound
- Brian Brodeur, New York DVD – DVD development
- Gizmo Enterprises – DVD mastering
- Sean McCauliffe – DVD menu design
- David Glaser – DVD encoding & authoring
