= The Aerosmurf =

Fourteenth album in the series The Smurfs

The Aerosmurf (L'Aéroschtroumpf)
- Cover of the French-language version
- Creator: Peyo
- Date: March 1990
- Series: The Smurfs
- Page count: 44 pages
- Publisher: Dupuis

Original publication
- Language: French

Chronology
- Preceded by: The Smurflings (1988)
- Followed by: The Strange Awakening of Lazy Smurf (1991)

The Aerosmurf (original French title: L'Aéroschtroumpf) is the fourteenth album of the original French-language Smurfs comic series created by Belgian artist Peyo. Apart from the titular one, it contains other four stories: The Gluttony of the Smurfs, The Masked Smurfer, Puppy and the Smurfs and Jokey Smurf's Jokes.

== Plot summaries ==
=== The Aerosmurf ===
Flying Smurf still has not abandoned his dream of flying, (Note: As seen in The Flying Smurf story from The Black Smurfs.) so he asks Handy Smurf to make him a flying machine.

The following morning, Flying Smurf shows off to the other Smurfs his new airplane, the Aerosmurf. Whilst flying around in it, Flying Smurf destroys Smurfette's flowers and her laundry. Furious, Smurfette goes to the forest to calm down. Gargamel captures her and sends a note to the Smurfs, stating that she will be freed in exchange for her weight in gold, but the Smurfs do not have any.

Flying Smurf uses his Aerosmurf to rescue Smurfette from Gargamel's net. Unable to reach the flying machine, Gargamel decides to build his own, which features pedals connected to bat-like wings. Gargamel fires arrows at the Aerosmurf, but Flying Smurf performs a loop and throws explosive gifts (presumably from Jokey Smurf) that destroy Gargamel's machine. After landing, Smurfette makes Flying Smurf promise to repair everything he destroyed during his first flight.

=== The Gluttony of the Smurfs ===
Gargamel makes a sarsaparilla cake and mixes a petrification elixir into it, then he leaves it in the forest for the Smurfs to find. The following day, some Smurfs go to the forest to pick raspberries. They find the cake, and eat it despite Brainy Smurf's warnings; they even throw some cake in his face, so he also becomes exposed to it. The Smurfs, with the exception of Grouchy Smurf – the only one who does not eat cake – are all petrified by the elixir. Grouchy goes to alert Papa Smurf in the Village. Gargamel takes the petrified Smurfs to his house, but has to leave in search of ingredients he needs for an antidote. Papa Smurf and the rest of the Smurfs arrive, read the antidote formula, get the ingredients before Gargamel, restore the petrified Smurfs and leave. Before doing so, Papa Smurf leaves behind a caramel laced with a substance that will make Gargamel's body too soft to chase them.

=== The Masked Smurfer ===
There is disharmony among the Smurfs. Jokey Smurf arrives with his face full of cream and says a masked Smurf with a cape threw a cake in his face. Then Brainy Smurf and Smurfette arrive, also claiming to have been pied in the face by the masked Smurf.

That night, the masked Smurf shoots an arrow, with a note attached telling the Smurfs to write down the names of whomever they would want to throw a pie at and leave the note in the hollow trunk in the forest for him.

While every Smurf deny writing a name, they all do. The following day every Smurf has been pied at least once. They decide to investigate Chef Smurf. However, by comparing the taste of the Masked Smurfer's pies and Chef Smurf's, Greedy Smurf finds that the difference in taste proves his innocence.

To find the culprit, Papa Smurf sends a note to the Masked Smurfer, dipped in white ink. After everybody is pied the following day, Brainy Smurf finds the Masked Smurfer's disguise, which makes him the Smurfs' prime suspect. Then, Papa Smurf tells everybody to show their hands. Jokey Smurf's hands are white due to the ink; he had pied himself the first time to avert suspicion.

=== Puppy and the Smurfs ===
One morning, the Smurfs find a creature in the village. Everybody is scared, until Papa Smurf arrives and tells them it is just Puppy, the dog belonging to the wizard Homnibus. The Smurfs think Homnibus may have sent a message inside Puppy's locket, but everyone who tries to open the locket is electrocuted. Papa Smurf sends a message to Homnibus, and the Smurfs care for Puppy in the meantime. Papa Smurf gets his own message back, which means Homnibus is not at home.

The Smurfs leave to take Puppy back to Homnibus' home, but are secretly followed by Gargamel. They eventually find out from Homnibus, who had just returned from looking for his dog, that Puppy had fled. Papa Smurf asks about the locket, and Homnibus explains that whoever opens it will become Puppy's real master; the eavesdropping Gargamel hears all of this. Homnibus offers Puppy to the Smurfs if they like him.

Gargamel captures Puppy using a net and tries to open his locket, but gets electrocuted. Puppy escapes to the Smurf village and Gargamel follows him. While he tries to capture Smurfs, Baby Smurf opens Puppy's locket and sends him against Gargamel. The defeated Gargamel returns home to try to make a similar locket for Azrael.

=== Jokey Smurf's Jokes ===
The Smurfs are tired of Jokey Smurf's explosive presents, so Papa Smurf makes him promise to never give such gifts again. Depressed by this admonition at first, Jokey Smurf eventually decides to make more varied jokes: he gives a water-squirting flower to Smurfette, puts a fake ink stain on Poet Smurf's poem, and so on. Everybody gets tired of his new jokes, so nobody wants to see him. Jokey Smurf goes to the forest and is captured by Gargamel. He makes a fake explosion sound, causing Gargamel to drop him and allowing him to free himself. But Gargamel still manages to follow him to the village. To make Gargamel go away, Jokey Smurf asks Papa Smurf if he can break the promise, to which Papa Smurf agrees. Jokey Smurf then gives a big explosive present to Gargamel that sends him away. Jokey Smurf then returns to his old pranks.

== Publications and other media ==
- While the main story of the book was not adapted for TV, the plots of the latest three stories are similar to some TV episodes.
- The Howlibird briefly appears during "The Aerosmurf".
- "The Masked Smurfer" is the first time Chef Smurf and Greedy Smurf appear in the same story, thus confirming they are separate characters in the original canon (unlike the animated series).
