= The Olympic Smurfs =

Eleventhh album in the series The Smurfs

The Olympic Smurfs (Les Schtroumpfs Olympiques)
- Cover of the French-language version
- Creator: Peyo
- Date: January 1983
- Series: The Smurfs
- Page count: 48 pages
- Publisher: Dupuis

Original publication
- Language: French

Chronology
- Preceded by: Smurf Soup (1976)
- Followed by: Baby Smurf (1984)

The Olympic Smurfs (original French title: Les Schtroumpfs Olympiques) is the eleventh album of the original French-language Smurfs comic series created by Belgian artist Peyo. It was first published in Spirou in 1980 and appeared in book format in 1984.

== Plot ==
Hefty Smurf decides to organize games to get the other Smurfs to play sports. When the Smurfs hear the prize is a medal, they don't care (since they already got medals in the King Smurf story), so the prize is changed to a kiss from the Smurfette.

The Smurfs form two teams for the games: yellow team and red team. Nobody wants Weakling Smurf on their team, so Hefty Smurf suggests to him to compete on his own. Brainy Smurf decides to be the referee, and has cards of any color, but lacks a whistle, so asks Handy Smurf to make one for him.

The following morning, Hefty Smurf goes to see the Smurfs' training, and finds Weakling Smurf alone, so he goes to wake the others, who then decide to eat breakfast. Hefty Smurf criticizes them and tells them to follow Weakling Smurf's example, so they decide to watch Weakling Smurf's training.

Weakling Smurf makes a poor time running. During his hammer-throwing practice, accidentally hits Hefty Smurf's foot when trying to raise the hammer, and then throws it at very little distance. For the high jump, he jumps under the bar, but feels proud since he didn't touch the bar, just like Hefty Smurf told him.

Then comes the training of the other Smurfs. Handy Smurf uses springs for the long jump, which Hefty Smurf tells him is again the rules, but then he notices he hasn't written a rulebook, so Papa Smurf offers his help writing one. In the meantime, the Smurfs train in unorthodox ways, until Hefty Smurf begins crying, so the others promise to take the training seriously during the following days. Papa Smurf arrives with the completed rulebook, but Hefty Smurf tells him they don't need it anymore.

The afternoon before the games, Papa Smurf finds Weakling Smurf, who has decided to leave the games because he will always be a weakling. Papa Smurf gives him a formula he must apply on his nose before any event to win.

The next morning, the games begin with the arrival of the yellow team, the red team and Weakling Smurf (who wears green). Weakling Smurf wins all the events, partly due to the yellow and red teams cheating against each other, and partly due to Papa Smurf's formula. During the last event, the marathon, Weakling Smurf feels too tired to continue, but sits on ivy and runs away, winning the race.

However, Weakling Smurf refuses the medal, saying that, since he used Papa Smurf's formula, he won cheating. Papa Smurf explain the formula was just fruit jelly, so he won fair and square both the medal and Smurfette's kiss, but before he gets the kiss, Brainy Smurf reveals he has a last card for Smurfette: a pink card, so Smurfette decides to walk away with Brainy instead.

== In other media ==
An animated version of The Olympic Smurfs entitled The Smurfic Games aired on NBC Television in 1984 (The same year that the 1984 Summer Olympic Games took place in Los Angeles California and is loosely based on The Olympic Smurfs).

== See also ==
- Characters in The Smurfs
