= Freya North =

British writer

- Born: 21 November 1967 (age 58); London, England
- Occupation: Novelist
- Children: 2
- Writing career
- Language: English
- Period: 1996–present
- Genre: Chick lit
- Notable awards: Romantic Novel of the Year
- Website: freyanorth.com

Freya North (born 21 November 1967) is a British writer, active since 1996, and one of the precursors of chick lit. Her novels, which have been critical and financial successes, centre on strong female characters and their raunchy exploits.

== Biography ==
In 1991, she gave up writing her PhD in art history in order to start writing her first novel, Sally, about a woman embarking on a no-strings erotic affair. Agent Jonathan Lloyd at Curtis Brown Ltd put the novel into a five-publisher bidding war which resulted in a three-book deal for a six-figure sum. Sally was published in 1996. Chloe followed soon after, and tells of a woman travelling around the four countries of the UK during the four seasons of the year and her various sensual exploits en route. Polly, about a teacher exchange trip between America and England, was published in 1998 and Cat, about a sports journalist covering the Tour de France, in 2000.

Further titles were Fen (2001), set in the art world and Pip, about a female clown (2004). Her seventh novel, Love Rules (2005), about whether one listens to one's head or follows one's heart, was published in 2005. Home Truths, which reunites the McCabe characters from earlier novels Cat, Fen, and Pip, was published in 2006.

In 2008, North won the Romantic Novel of the Year Award for her ninth novel, Pillow Talk, which reunites childhood sweethearts Petra and Arlo—now a sleepwalker and an insomniac. Pillow Talk was set in the north-east of England, specifically in Teesside. Secrets, North's tenth novel, also set in the north-east, was published in 2009. Because the book's setting was the small Victorian resort of Saltburn by the Sea and featured the famous Transporter Bridge in Middlesbrough, the author was subsequently invited to become an ambassador for the region.

In 2024, she released The Unfinished Business of Eadie Brown, which she wrote because she was "compelled to write a story with Jewish characters and values at its core".

== Bibliography ==
=== Standalone novels ===
- Sally (1996)
- Chloe (1997)
- Polly (1998)
- Love Rules (2005)
- Pillow Talk (2007)
- Secrets (2009)
- Chances (2011)
- Rumours (2012)
- The Way Back Home (2014)
- The Turning Point (2015)
- Little Wing (2022)
- The Unfinished Business of Eadie Brown (2024)

=== McCabe Sisters ===
1. Cat (2000)
2. Fen (2001)
3. Pip (2004)
4. Home Truths (2006)

=== Short stories ===
- "In and Out" (2000), published in Girls Night In
