= The Smurflings =

Thirteenth album in the series The Smurfs

The Smurflings (Les P'tits Schtroumpfs)
- Cover of the French-language version
- Creator: Peyo
- Date: April 1988
- Series: The Smurfs
- Page count: 47 pages
- Publisher: Dupuis

Original publication
- Language: French

Chronology
- Preceded by: Baby Smurf (1984)
- Followed by: The Aerosmurf (1990)

The Smurflings (original French title: Les P'tits Schtroumpfs) is the thirteenth album of the original French-language Smurfs comic series created by Belgian artist Peyo.

Apart from the titular one, it contains other story: The Clockwork Smurf.

== Plots ==
=== The Smurflings ===
The noise of some Smurfs practising for an upcoming concert causes Papa Smurf's hourglass ("This hourglass has seen better hours!") to break, so he sends three Smurfs (Natural Smurf, Slouchy Smurf, and Snappy Smurf) to Father Time's house after a new one. Papa Smurf also finds Smurfette sad about being the only female Smurf.

At Father Time's house, Natural's butterfly sneaks into a grandfather clock and the three Smurfs go after it. However, the clock is a magical clock that goes backwards and de-ages all four of them as three Smurflings and a little caterpillar. They find they like their new childhood, and return to the village.

Back at the village, the Smurflings get into inter-generational conflict with their fellow Smurfs, mainly Brainy Smurf. They decide to dress their own personal styles rather than wear the classic Smurf outfits. Snappy gets ahead of Grouchy Smurf telling "AND I HATE THE BIG SMURFS!" before Grouchy can say "I hate Smurflings", and Slouchy makes one of Jokey Smurf's present backfire on him.

At the concert, Brainy Smurf directs the orchestra in a musical piece that makes most Smurfs sleep, and then the Smurflings arrive with homemade instruments and a rhythmic piece that makes everybody dance.

The next day, the Smurflings notice Smurfette's depression for lack of a fellow female friend, so they go to Gargamel's house and steal his Smurfette formula from his magic book. When Gargamel finds this, he casts a spell in the clay needed to make a Smurfette; when the noon sunlight hits anything made with that clay, it will explode. Not knowing this, the Smurflings take the clay and use it to create a female Smurfling named Sassette. Smurfette is very happy to have a friend, but Papa Smurf grounds the Smurflings for doing all of this without permission.

Sassette wanders the village and Grouchy Smurf tells her he hates her because, as a Smurfette, she's a Gargamel creature. The curious Sassette asks who is Gargamel, so Grouchy tells her about the evil wizard, and that his house at the other side of the forest. Sassete goes to Gargamel's house thinking that he might befriend her, and the sorcerer runs from her, knowing she will explode soon. Luckily, Papa Smurf discovers about the enchanted clay Sassette was made from, and makes an antidote that he then throws in her face, thus preventing her from exploding, and she is then welcomed into the Smurf community with open arms.

=== The Clockwork Smurf ===
Handy Smurf creates Clockwork Smurf, a robot that will do all of Handy's housework. Clockwork Smurf has an additional trick: he eats Sarsaparilla leaves, turning them into hot sarsaparilla soup that he serves through his hat into bowls of soup to give to the Smurfs.

During a trip to the forest, Clockwork and Handy are captured by Gargamel, who then builds a fake, grumpier Clockwork Smurf out of clay and sends out to be found by the Smurfs. Rather than soup, the fake Clockwork gives the Smurfs venom that will change them into hideous forms the following day. Papa Smurf distrusts Clockwork's different attitude and doesn't drink the soup.

The real Clockwork bends his cage's bars, not enough for him yet enough to allow Handy out to warn the village. Handy arrives at the village at dawn to find all Smurfs (sans Papa) as ugly creatures. He tells them the whole story, so they go to Gargamel's house, where the fake Clockwork has returned.

Gargamel makes both Clockwork Smurfs fight, but the Smurfs arrive and defeat Gargamel, while the real Clockwork defeats the fake one and Azrael runs away, scared by the changed Smurfs. The real Clockwork's soup works as an antidote for the Smurfs and then they give Gargamel the fake Clockwork's soup, which he unwittingly consumes, turning himself into a monster. After the Smurfs go away, Gargamel tells the Fake Clockwork to drink a superstrength potion, but he mistakenly drinks an explosive potion and end up blown to smithereens. Unaware that he has been turned hideous by his own soup, Gargamel then tries to get Azrael's help, but the cat doesn't recognise him and runs away terrified.

At the Smurf village, everything is back to normal.

== Publication and Other Media ==
=== On The Smurfs animated cartoon ===
The Hanna-Barbera animated adaptation of "The Smurflings" was split into two episodes as the fifth-season premiere. The installments are called "The Smurflings" and "Sassette."

In "The Smurflings," the adult Snappy disobeys Papa Smurf's order not to touch anything when he opens the door to the magical clock. While the clock's door is open, Nat's butterfly flies through, causing Nat to go after it; afterward, the clock goes haywire and begins to de-age Nat, and when Snappy and Slouchy go in to rescue their fellow Smurf they too are de-aged. Father Time himself is appealed to for help by Papa Smurf, but even he can't undo the damage. In addition, the three Smurfs seem to forget most of their lives as young adult Smurfs.

In "Sassette," the newly created Sassette is at first mischievous until Papa Smurf can cast a spell on her to change her behavior to that of a tomboyish but otherwise normal female Smurfling. She runs away when Snappy Smurfling, upset over being punished by Papa, makes an insensitive remark insinuating that Papa didn't want Sassette created and that she was created using one of Gargamel's spells. Sassette goes to Gargamel's cottage where she believes she'll be appreciated, causing Gargamel (who cast an explosive spell on the clay used to create her) and Azrael to run in terror. Papa is able to break the spell in the end, and Sassette is accepted into the Smurf community. Unaware of what Papa had done, Gargamel is surprised and puzzled that Sassette didn't explode, and so goes to check on the clay he had enchanted, only to end up being literally blasted into the sky! After the explosion Gargamel and Azrael are blast to Gargamel mother’s house just in time for lunch much to their disgust and dismay.

In the Hanna-Barbera cartoon version of "The Clockwork Smurf", Handy makes Clockwork to make the Smurfs' lives easier by doing all their work. Clockwork starts off well at first, but then malfunctions thanks to Brainy's ignorant tinkering with his works, causing him to wreck much unintentional havoc. This leads Handy to reluctantly decide, under pressure from the other Smurfs, to deactivate Clockwork and then dump him in the woods. Clockwork revives however, and ends up rallying to the side of Gerard, a boy prince who is the rightful king of his country, but is now imprisoned by his evil aunt Lady Imperia who is ruling instead (she is the villain in this version instead of Gargamel, who doesn't appear). Eventually the Smurfs get involved as well, with Papa Smurf casting a spell of invisibility over himself, Handy and the other Smurfs so that they can help Gerard and Clockwork unseen. In the end, Gerard gets his kingdom back and adopts Clockwork as his friend and advisor, while Handy, pleased that his creation has proven to be useful after all, returns home with the other Smurfs. This adaption also was made and released seasons before "The Smurflings" and "Sassette".

=== Other ===
- At a point in "The Smurflings", Brainy Smurf is thrown out of the village like in the cartoon, rather than being hit with a mallet like in other comic books.
