= Gertrude Polley =

British co-operator (1900–1982)

Gertrude Polley OBE
- Born: Gertrude Florence Polley; 1900
- Died: 1982 (aged 81–82)
- Organization: International Co-operative Alliance
- Movement: Co-operative

Gertrude Florence Polley OBE (1900 – 1982) was a British co-operative activist.

Polley began working for the International Co-operative Alliance in 1917, as personal secretary to Henry J. May, the organisation's general secretary. She remained in the post until May's death, in 1939, at which time, she was appointed as acting general secretary. In 1947, she was finally appointed to the post on a permanent basis. In 1949, she was made an Officer of the Order of the British Empire. She retired in 1963, and died in 1982.

Non-profit organization positions
Preceded by Henry J. May	General Secretary of the International Co-operative Alliance; 1937–1963	Succeeded by Position abolished
