= Poly Technologies =

Chinese defense manufacturer

- Type: State-owned enterprise
- Industry: Defense
- Parent: China Poly Group
- Website: polytechnologiesinc.com

Poly Technologies (Chinese: 保利科技有限公司), sometimes abbreviated as PolyTech, a subsidiary of China Poly Group Corporation, is a trade company with headquarters in Beijing, China. The company deals with missiles and other military products. The company was founded by the Chinese People's Liberation Army in order to provide competition to China North Industries Corporation (Norinco). The company is one of China's largest arms exporters and has been sanctioned by the United States.

As a traditional pillar industry of Poly Group Corp., the international trading business is mainly undertaken by Poly Technologies Inc., both the predecessor of the Poly Group and a backbone enterprise of the Group.

== History ==
Founded in 1984, it is mainly engaged in the import and export business of general merchandise, special equipment, and technology.

Poly Technologies has supplied gunpowder to Russian ammunition manufacturers following the Russian invasion of Ukraine.

== Military activity ==
Poly Technologies was involved in the shipment of weapons (specifically SALW – Small Arms and Light Weapons) to Zimbabwe around the time of the 2008 Election Crisis, and was then refused entry into South African Ports shortly before docking.

Poly Technologies developed the LANU-M1 vehicle-mounted counter-unmanned aerial vehicle system, designed to be mounted on the roofs of vehicles.

In February 2023, the Center for Advanced Defense Studies reported that customs data showed that Poly Technologies shipped navigation equipment to Rosoboronexport for Mil Mi-17 helicopters following the Russian invasion of Ukraine.

In June 2023, Import Genius identified Poly Technologies as having supplied Russian ammunition manufacturer Barnaul Cartridge Plant with enough smokeless powder to make at least 80 million rounds of ammunition.

== Products ==
Polytech is notable in North America as an early supplier of semi-automatic AK-47-style weapons to civilians. These modifications of Type 56 assault rifle were available in both 5.56 NATO and 7.62 Soviet ammunition, and have been described as "well-made" by Ian McCollum of Forgotten Weapons.

Other mainly civilian offerings include versions of the Zijiang M99 as well as M14 (M305) and M16 (CQ-A) clones similar to Norinco's. These three are seen in the Canadian list of prohibited firearms.

== Business relations ==
Poly Group has established business relations with hundreds of enterprises and governmental organizations of nearly 100 countries and regions, including many multinational corporations such as Boeing of the United States, Bombardier Inc. of Canada, Chevron - Texaco of the United States, Benz of Germany, Ferrari of Italy, State Corporation 'Rosoboronexport' and Japanese Sagawa Logistic Co., Ltd. It has also established cooperative relations with domestic government departments and many noted companies.

== Subsidiaries ==
- Continental Mariner
- Lolliman, LTD.
- Ringo Trading Company
