= Polly Perkins (disambiguation) =

Polly Perkins (b. 1943) is a British actress, singer and writer.

Polly Perkins may also refer to:

- Polly Miller-Perkins, the Armed Forces Commissioner and former RAF officer
- Bill Perkins (Australian rules footballer), nicknamed "Polly"
- The main character of the comic strip Polly and Her Pals
- A character in the film Sky Captain and the World of Tomorrow, played by Gwyneth Paltrow
- The mobile steam oven invented by Loftus Perkins

== See also ==
- "Pretty Polly Perkins of Paddington Green", an English song
