= Polly (novel) =

1998 novel by Freya North

- First edition
- Author: Freya North
- Language: English
- Genre: chick lit
- Publisher: W. Heinemann
- Publication date: 1998
- Publication place: United Kingdom
- Pages: 400
- ISBN: 9780749323431
- OCLC: 1200546711

Polly is a 1998 chick lit novel by Freya North about a young Englishwoman—the eponymous Polly.

== Synopsis ==
As a teacher, Polly takes part in an exchange scheme that brings her to Vermont for a year. There, she fits in quite nicely and starts an affair with one of her male colleagues although she has left a boyfriend behind in London. In the end they are able to sort out their differences and make up.

== Reception ==
Wales on Sunday called Polly "a fresh and witty follow-up to...Sally and Chloe", and the Stirling Observer described the novel as "lighthearted" and a good way to "pass the time on a long journey". Canada's National Post, on the other hand, called it "foul", summarizing the storytelling as "Enid Blyton, but with sex".

In November 1998 Polly reached #3 on The Guardian's original paperback fiction bestseller list. In 1999, the Scottish Daily Record reported that film rights for the novel had been sold for an undisclosed amount.

== Editions ==
Polly was first published by W. Heinemann in 1998. In 2001, translations were published in German, Czech, Dutch and Hungarian. In 2005, the Royal National Institute of Blind People published an audio version narrated by Juliet Prague. In 2012, the novel was reissued by HarperCollins in print and e-book formats.
