= Polly Miller-Perkins =

British Royal Air Force officer

Polly Miller-Perkins CBE
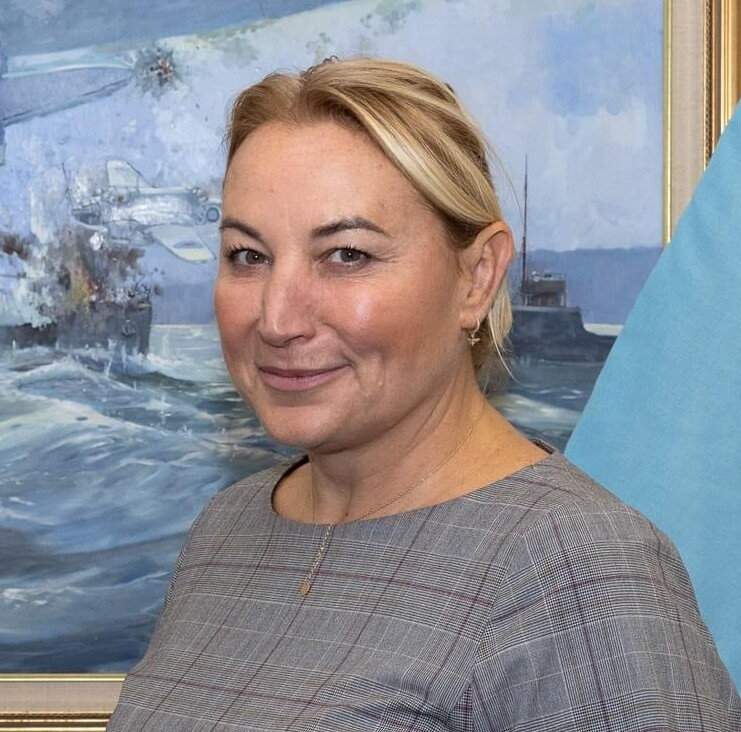
- Miller-Perkins in 2022
- Born: Suzanne Natalie Miller-Perkins
- Other name: Polly Perkins
- Military career
- Allegiance: United Kingdom
- Branch: Royal Air Force
- Service years: 1990–2026
- Rank: Air Commodore
- Commands: Tactical Supply Wing RAF
- Conflicts: War in Afghanistan
- Awards: Commander of the Order of the British Empire

Air Commodore Suzanne Natalie "Polly" Miller-Perkins, CBE (née Perkins) is a British former Royal Air Force officer who has served as the Armed Forces Commissioner since 2026.

== RAF career ==
On 29 March 1990, she was commissioned in the Women's Royal Air Force (WRAF) as a logistics officer with the rank of acting pilot officer. She was a direct entrant, having joined at 18 without a university degree, and was the third generation of her family to serve in the RAF, following her father and grandfather. She was regraded to pilot officer on 29 September l990. She was promoted to flying officer 29 September 1992. The WRAF merged in to the Royal Air Force in 1994. She was promoted to flight lieutenant on 29 September 1996, and to squadron leader on 1 January 2001. From 2007 to 2008, she was posted to NATO Allied Command Transformation in Virginia, USA, as head of the multi-national logistics. She served a tour of duty with the Kosovo Force and was twice deployed to Afghanistan.

From 2011 to 2013, she was commanding officer of the Tactical Supply Wing RAF, based at MOD Stafford. She was promoted to group captain on 7 January 2013. She served as deputy commander of the 101st Logistic Brigade and Joint Force Support Afghanistan between 2013 and 2014. She was head of establishment at RAF Brize Norton from 2014 to 2016. Her final full-time appointment in the RAF was as deputy commander and chief of staff British Forces Cyprus from 2017 to 2020. In 2018, following the change in rules that made all officers eligible, she was awarded the Royal Air Force Long Service and Good Conduct Medal with one clasp, representing 25 years of service. In the 2020 Queen's Birthday Honours, she was appointed a Commander of the Order of the British Empire (CBE).

She transferred to the Royal Air Force Reserve on 27 September 2022, with the rank of air commodore. As a reservist, she served as Regional Air Officer South West (AOSW) from 2022 to 2026. Her commission with the Air Force Reserves ended on 30 March 2026, when she became Armed Forces Commissioner.

== Later life ==
In January 2021, she took up the post of principal and chief executive of Brockenhurst College, a tertiary college in Brockenhurst, Hampshire. She after two years to return as a full-time reservist in the RAF.

In March 2026, Miller-Perkins was selected by the defence secretary as the first Armed Forces Commissioner and approved by the Defence Committee. The post that was created by the Armed Forces Commissioner Act 2025. She took up the appointment on 30 March 2026, for an initial one-year term.
