= China Poly Group =

Chinese state-owned conglomerate

China Poly Group Corporation

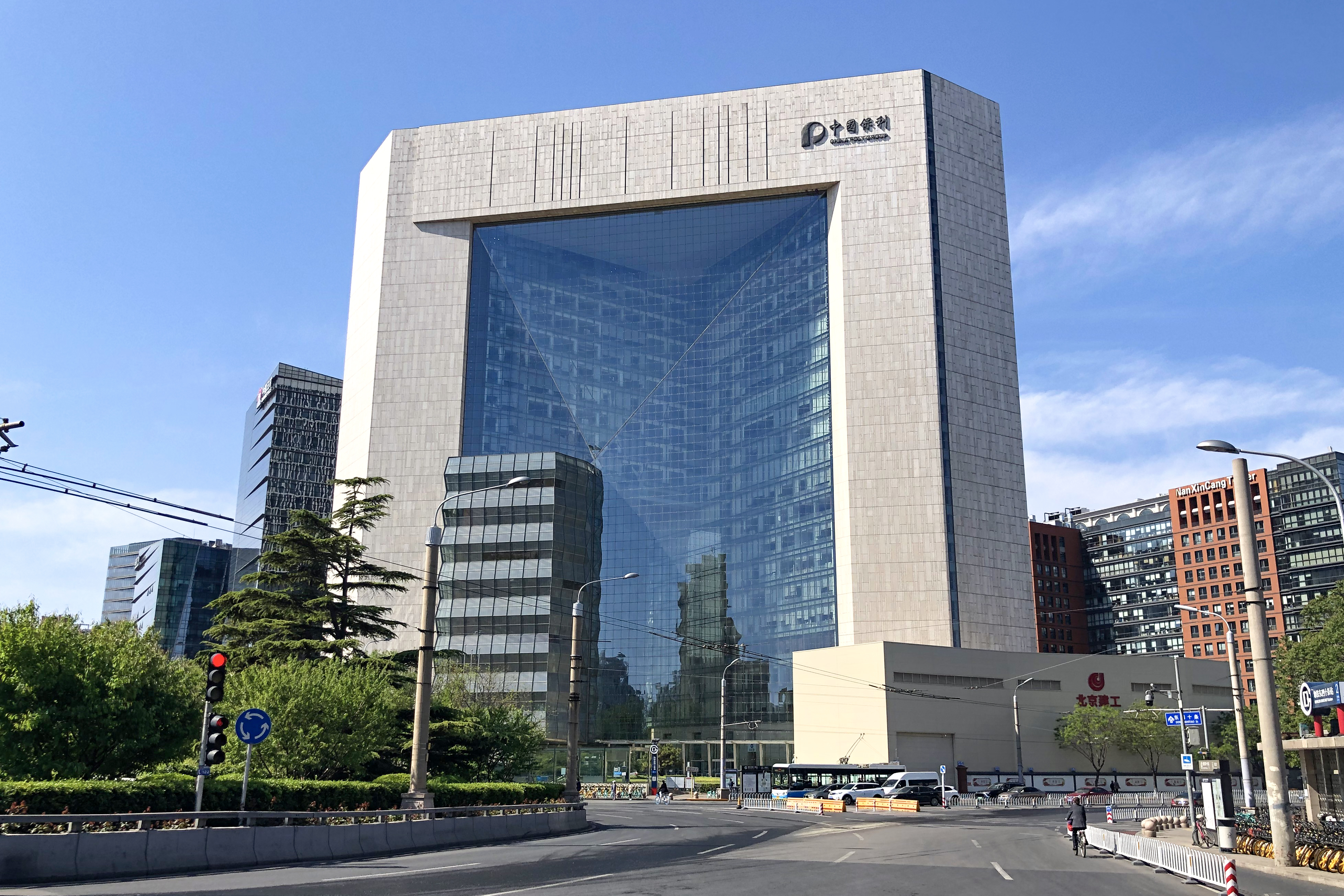
- New Beijing Poly Plaza in 2020
- Trade name: Poly Group
- Native name: 中国保利集团公司
- Romanized name: Zhōngguó Bǎolì Jítuán
- Company type: State-owned enterprise
- Industry: Conglomerate
- Founded: 1999; 27 years ago
- Headquarters: Beijing, China
- Key people: Zhengao Zhang (President and Director), Xu Wang (Vice President), Ming Xue (Vice President), Wang Lin (Vice President)
- Revenue: 305,646,000,000 renminbi (2018)
- Subsidiaries: Poly Technologies
- Website: www.poly.com.cn

China Poly Group Corporation (Chinese: 中国保利集团公司; pinyin: Zhōngguó Bǎolì Jítuán Gōngsī) is a state owned Chinese business group among 102 central state owned enterprises under the supervision of State-owned Assets Supervision and Administration Commission of the State Council (SASAC).

It is both primarily engaged in representing the Chinese defense manufacturing industry in international sales and the world's third largest art auction house (behind Sotheby's and Christie's).

== History ==
With the approval of the State Council, China Poly Group Corp. was set up on the basis of Poly Technologies, Inc. in February 1992. Poly Technologies was formed in 1984 as an arms-manufacturing wing of the People's Liberation Army.

== Poly Corporation Headquarters ==
The Poly Corporation Headquarters in Beijing, designed by Skidmore, Owings & Merrill (SOM), serves as a central hub for the company's subsidiaries. The building features a 90-meter-tall atrium, enclosed by the world's largest cable-net-supported glass wall, creating a visually striking centerpiece. The structure incorporates sustainable design elements, such as a double-layer low-e glass facade and a roof garden to enhance energy efficiency. Additionally, the building houses the Poly Museum, which showcases China's cultural antiquities, suspended within the atrium by innovative engineering.

== Procurement actions during the COVID-19 pandemic ==
Group entities were active in procurement during the COVID-19 pandemic. Figures from China Customs show that some 2.46 billion pieces of epidemic prevention and control materials had been imported between 24 January and 29 February, including 2.02 billion masks and 25.38 million items of protective clothing valued at 8.2 billion yuan ($1 billion). Press obtained internal documents showing that the group, together with other Chinese companies and state-owned enterprises – such as Country Garden and Greenland Holdings – had an important role in scouring markets in countries around the world to procure essential medical supplies and equipment. The company said its operation was staff-led, and was "driven out of pure compassion for our people who have friends and family in the Wuhan region".

== Subsidiaries ==
- Poly Property
- Poly Real Estate
- Poly Technologies
- Poly Culture
- Poly Theatre
- Poly Auction
