= Poly Ugarte =

Ecuadorian activist, lawyer, and politician

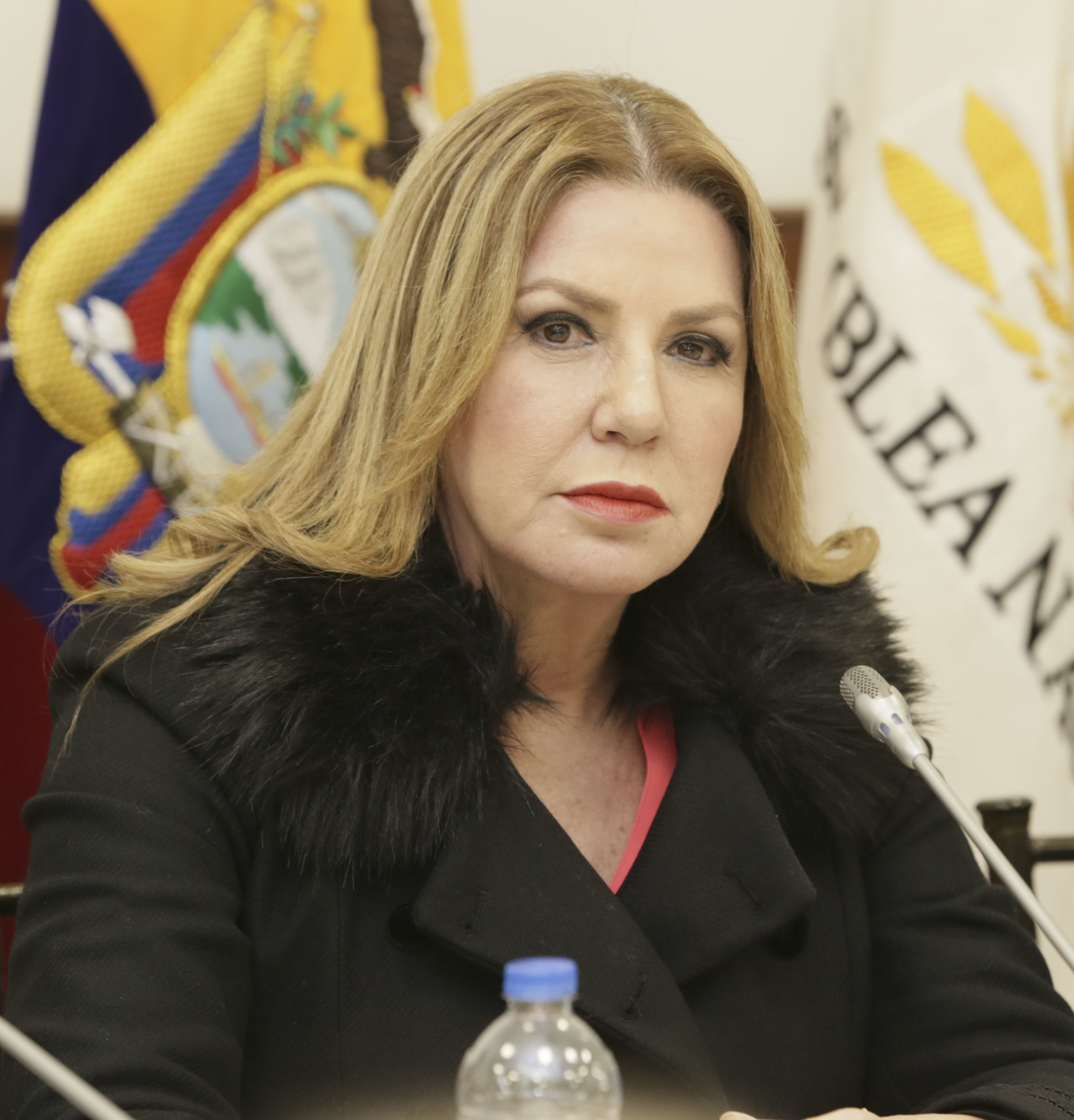

Member of the National Assembly
- In office May 14, 2017 – December 14, 2018
- Constituency: Guayas Province District 2

Member of the National Congress
- In office August 10, 1998 – January 5, 2003
- Constituency: Guayas Province

Municipal Councilor of Guayaquil Canton
- In office August 10, 1994 – August 10, 1998

Personal details
- Born: Blanca Rosana Ugarte Guzmán; 1959 (age 66–67) Puerto Bolívar, Ecuador
- Party: Social Christian Party (1992–2018); Creating Opportunities (since 2018)
- Education: Universidad Católica de Santiago de Guayaquil
- Occupation: Politician, lawyer

Blanca Rosana Ugarte Guzmán (born 1959), better known as Poly Ugarte, is an Ecuadorian activist, lawyer, and politician.

== Biography ==
Poly Ugarte was born in 1959 in the Puerto Bolívar parish of Machala Canton. She completed high school at La Asunción school and her higher education at the Universidad Católica de Santiago de Guayaquil, where she obtained a law degree.

She began her political career in 1992 in support of the presidential candidacy of conservative Jaime Nebot. In the 1994 sectional election, she won a seat as councilor of Guayaquil Canton for the Social Christian Party (PSC), during the mayoral administration of León Febres Cordero. She was one of the councilors who voted in favor of the construction of Malecón 2000.

In the 1998 legislative election, she was chosen national deputy representing Guayas Province for the same party. She served in this position until 2003.

Years later, Ugarte returned to politics for the PSC, and won a seat as a member of the National Assembly representing Guayas in the 2017 legislative elections. At the end of 2018, she disenrolled from the PSC and resigned her position to participate as a candidate for the prefecture of Guayas Province for the Creating Opportunities party. In the following year's elections, she obtained third place.

== Activism ==
In 2006, she was diagnosed with breast cancer, which led her to create the Poly Ugarte Foundation with the goal of promoting the prevention of the disease. In October 2007, the foundation began its "Tócate" (Touch Yourself) campaign. In its first three years of operation, the foundation served more than 120,000 women for free.

Since then it has carried out campaigns, marches, and equipped mobile clinics in various Ecuadorian cities. It also has a service center in Guayaquil.
