= Poly Property =

Chinese property developer

Poly Property Group Co., Ltd.
- Trade name: Poly Property
- Formerly: Continental Mariner Investment Company; Poly (Hong Kong) Investments
- Type: public company
- Traded as: SEHK: 119
- Industry: Real estate development
- Founded: 27 February 1973; 53 years ago
- Headquarters: Hong Kong S.A.R., China (registered office); Shanghai, China (de facto)
- Area served: mainland China; Hong Kong S.A.R.
Key people
Xue Ming	(chairman)
Han Qingtao	(managing director)
- Products: Commercial buildings; Residential buildings; Shopping malls
- Revenue: ▲HK$30.580 billion (2016)
- Net income: ▲HK$81 million (2016)
- Total assets: ▼HK$122.073 billion (2016)
- Total equity: ▼HK$24.697 billion (2016)
Owner
China Poly Group	(47.32%)
general public	(52.68%)
Parent
Poly (HK) Holdings	(direct)
China Poly Group	(intermediate)
The SASAC	(intermediate)
The State Council	(ultimate)
- Website: polyhongkong.com.hk
- Footnotes: in consolidated financial statement, in HKFRSs; excluding perpetual capital instrument and minority interests

Poly Property Group Co., Ltd.
- Traditional Chinese: 保利置業集團有限公司
- Simplified Chinese: 保利置业集团有限公司
Transcriptions
Standard Mandarin
- Hanyu Pinyin: Bǎolì zhìyè jítuán yǒuxiàn gōngsī

Poly Property
- Traditional Chinese: 保利置業
- Simplified Chinese: 保利置业
Transcriptions
Standard Mandarin
- Hanyu Pinyin: Bǎolì zhìyè

Poly (Hong Kong) Investments
- Traditional Chinese: 保利(香港)投資
Transcriptions

Continental Mariner Investment
- Traditional Chinese: 新海康航業投資
Transcriptions

Poly Property Group Co., Ltd., is a Hong Kong incorporated Chinese property developer, with its major businesses include property development, investment and management. It mainly develops mid to high-end residential and commercial properties in the cities along Yangtze River Delta and Pearl River Delta as well as the second-tier provincial capitals.

Poly Property is a constituent of Hang Seng China-Affiliated Corporations Index (Red chip index)

He Ping, son of late military officer He Biao, and the son-in-law of the former Chinese leader, late Deng Xiaoping, is the former chairman of the company. He Ping was also the chairman of the parent company China Poly Group, which had a military background in the past.

== History ==
The corporate entity of Poly Property was established in 1973, originally as a shipping company called Continental Mariner Investment Company Limited (Chinese: 新海康航業投資有限公司, abb. CMIC). In 1993, China Poly Group Corporation acquired 55% stake in the company and converted its business from shipping to conglomerate, as a reverse IPO. In 2005, CMIC was renamed to Poly (Hong Kong) Investments Limited. In 2012 the company renamed again as Poly Property Group Co., Ltd..

Poly Property entered Hong Kong property market in 2014 by purchasing a land lease "New Kowloon Inland Lot No.6527" in an area formerly belonging to Kai Tak Airport, for HK$3.923 billion. The site was developed into Vibe Centro.

== Shareholders ==
As of 31 December 2016, Poly (Hong Kong) Holdings and its subsidiaries, owned 40.39% shares of the listed company (the subsidiaries are BVI companies Congratulations Co., Ltd., Source Holdings and Ting Shing Holdings respectively). Poly (Hong Kong) Holdings itself is a subsidiary of state-owned China Poly Group; China Poly Group owned an additional 6.93% shares of Poly Property, via mainland China incorporated "Poly Southern Group Co., Ltd." (Chinese: 保利南方集团有限公司). As Poly Property was incorporated outside mainland China, but controlled by Chinese Central Government indirectly, the company was considered as a red chip.

Charmian Xue Ming and independent non-executive directors: Choy Shu Kwan, Leung Sau Fan (Sylvia Leung) and Wong Ka Lun, also owned negligible number of the shares.

Poly Property also issued perpetual capital instrument in the past for CN¥1 billion. During 2016 financial year, all the bonds were fully redeemed by the company.

== See also ==
- Poly Real Estate, sister company
