= Polly Harrar =

British women's rights activist

- Occupation: Women's rights activist
- Years active: 2008–present
- Known for: Sharan Project

Polly Harrar is a British women's rights activist who assists women who have been the victims of forced marriage and honour crimes. She is the founder of the Sharan Project, a member of the Forced Marriage Unit Partnership Board, and a partner of Comic Relief's Our Girl campaign.

As a young woman, Harrar left home after having experienced 'cultural conflict' with her family. In 2008, she began supporting women from South Asian communities in the UK and has become an expert on forced marriages and honour based violence. She is regularly quoted in articles about honour-based violence affecting the UK's South Asian communities.

In 2013 she was nominated for the Asian Women of Achievement Award. In 2015 she received the Community Spirit award in the GG2 Leadership Awards. In 2016, she was awarded the Points of Light award by UK Prime Minister David Cameron on International Women's Day for her work.
