= Bruce Bickford (animator) =

American animator (1947–2019)

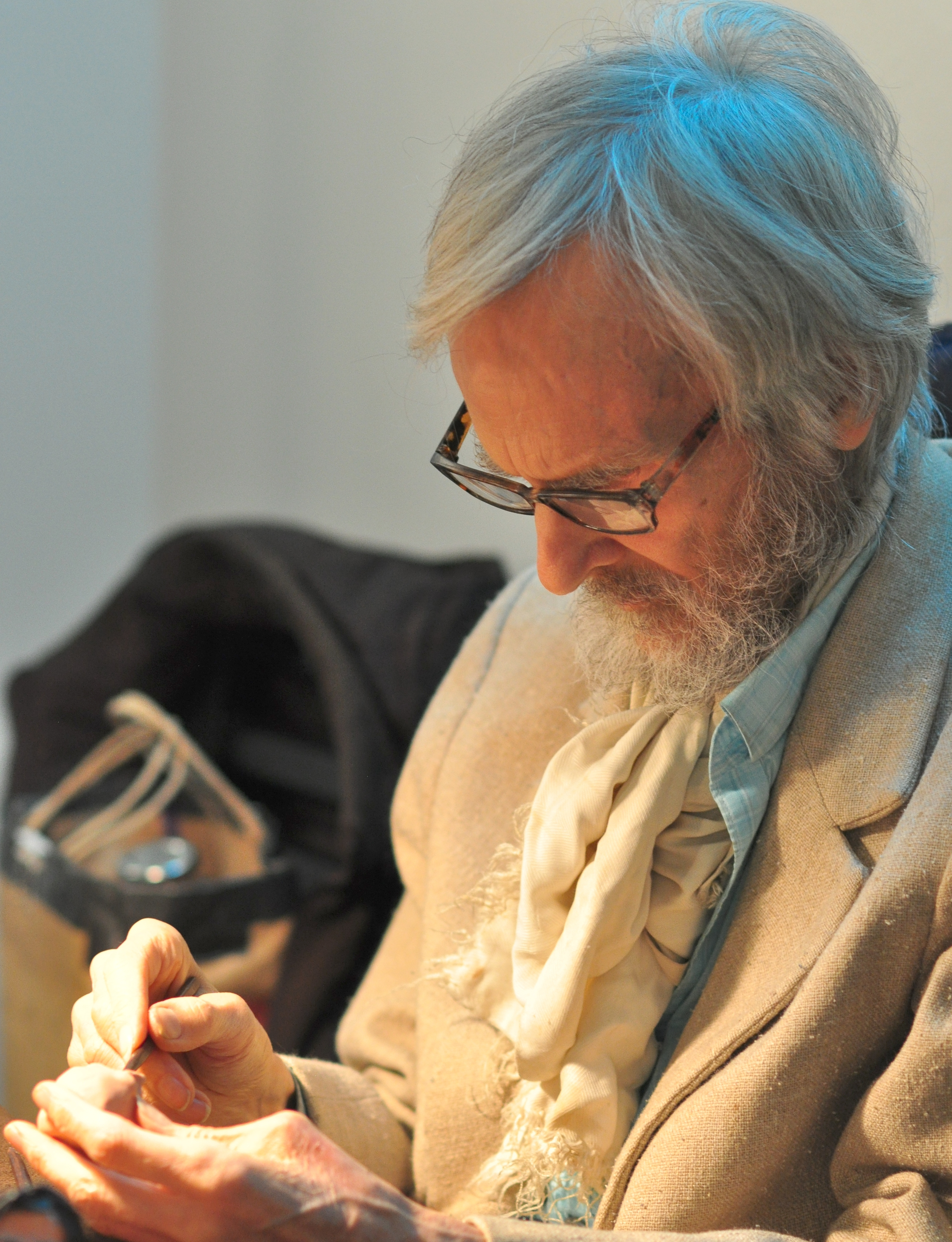
Bruce Bickford, 2018

Bruce Charles Bickford (February 11, 1947 – April 28, 2019) was an American artist, animator, and filmmaker, who worked primarily in line and clay animation. From 1974 to 1980, he collaborated with Frank Zappa in Los Angeles. Bickford's animation was featured extensively in the Frank Zappa videos Baby Snakes and The Dub Room Special. Zappa also released a video titled The Amazing Mr. Bickford, which was composed of Bickford animations set to a soundtrack of Zappa's orchestral music.

== Biography ==
Bickford was born in Seattle in 1947. He was one of four sons to George Edward Bickford and Audrey Ione Bickford (nee Spencer). He served with the U.S. Marines and fought during the Vietnam War.

Bickford's animations depict surreal scenes based on his unique worldview. Often outwardly seeming to be somewhat disconnected from the world around him, Bruce Bickford's work is extremely subjective in its content and concepts, making for some disturbing and shocking imagery. Much of his video work depicted fast-moving, fluid-like transformations of human figures and disfigured faces into odd beasts on surreal structural settings with impressive camera effects (moving around within his stop-motion animation).

His life and work were featured in the 2004 biographical documentary film Monster Road, directed by Brett Ingram.

In 2006, he was working on Boar's Head/Whore's Bed (line animation, 4,500+ frames and counting), Tales of the Green River and Castle 2001, a feature-length film which is animated using 3D shapes made out of bits of paper.

In 2008, Prometheus' Garden was released, a 28-minute short originally completed in 1988. The DVD also features Luck of a Foghorn, a documentary about the making of the film.

Bickford was the first guest to appear on the internet radio show Pussyfoot.

In 2010, he made rare appearances in several European cities following an invitation of the Brussels' Offscreen Film Festival and Nova Cinema.

In 2015, Bickford was working on a 500-plus-page graphic novel titled Vampire Picnic. It was stated at the time he was hoping to publish it with Fantagraphics.

On September 1, 2015, Bickford's new animated feature Cas'l was released on DVD. Most of the original animating had been done from 1988 to 1997. The film (or earlier versions of it) had previously been shown at various film festivals from 2008 onwards with live musical accompaniment, as a final soundtrack was not yet made.

Bickford died on April 28, 2019, from cardiac arrest. He was 72 years old.

== Filmography ==
- 1964/65 – Animated model cars and crude clay figures on 8mm film. 10 minutes.
- 1969 – Tree clay animation. 2.5 minutes.
- 1970 – Clay battle scene with more detailed figures. 2.5 minutes.
- 1971 – Last Battle on Flat Earth clay animation. 4 minutes.
- 1972 – Castle stuff and bar room scene. clay animation. 15 minutes.
- 1973 – Start of the Quest clay animation short. 3 minutes.
- 1974 – Little Boy in School ( featuring Gus Reeves as a child) clay animation short. 4 minutes.
- 1974 – A Token of His Extreme (Frank Zappa)
- 1979 – Baby Snakes (Frank Zappa)
- 1982 – The Dub Room Special (Frank Zappa)
- 1987 – Video From Hell and The Amazing Mr. Bickford (Frank Zappa)
- 1988 – Prometheus' Garden. 27 minutes.
- 2004 – Monster Road
- 2008 – Prometheus' Garden DVD
- 2015 – Cas'l
