= The Amazing Mr. Bickford =

1987 film

- Directed by: Bruce Bickford; Frank Zappa
- Written by: Frank Zappa
- Produced by: Frank Zappa; Jill Silverthorne
- Starring: Bruce Bickford; Frank Zappa
- Edited by: Booey Kober
- Music by: Frank Zappa
- Release date: 1987
- Running time: 52 minutes
- Country: United States
- Language: English

The Amazing Mr. Bickford is a video released by Frank Zappa in 1987, containing orchestral pieces by Zappa set to the clay animation of Bruce Bickford. It was released direct-to-video (VHS only, no Betamax was made available). To date it has not yet been released on DVD.

== Music ==
- Naval Aviation In Art
- Mo 'n Herb's Vacation
- Dupree's Paradise
- The Perfect Stranger

== See also ==
- Adult animation
- List of stop motion films
- List of animated feature-length films
