= Pollyana Papel =

Brazilian singer, songwriter and actress (born 1987)

- Birth name: Pollyana Machado Papel
- Born: July 20, 1987 (age 37)
- Origin: Bebedouro, São Paulo, Brazil
- Genres: Pop/Rock
- Occupation(s): Singer, actress
- Instrument: Vocals

Pollyana Papel (born July 20, 1987 in Bebedouro, São Paulo) is a Brazilian singer, songwriter and actress best known for being a finalist on the first season of Ídolos Brazil (Brazilian Idol).
