= Pretty Polly =

Pretty Polly may refer to:

- "Pretty Polly" (ballad)
- Pretty Polly (film)
- Pretty Polly (opera)
- Pretty Polly (horse)
- Pretty Polly (hosiery)
- "Polly" (The Kinks song), sometimes mislabeled "Pretty Polly"
