= Polly Sy =

Filipino mathematician

Polly Wee Sy is a Filipino mathematician specializing in functional analysis. She is a professor emeritus of mathematics at the University of the Philippines Diliman, the former head of the mathematics department at the university, and the former president of the Southeast Asia Mathematical Society.

Sy has a bachelor's degree, master's degree, and Ph.D. in mathematics from the University of the Philippines Diliman, earned in 1974, 1977, and 1982 respectively. Her doctoral dissertation, Köthe duals and matrix transformations, was supervised by Singaporean mathematician Peng Yee Lee. She also has a second doctorate, a 1992 D.Sc. from Nagoya University.

Sy chaired the mathematics department at the University of the Philippines Diliman twice, from 1994 to 1996 and 1999 to 2002, and served as president of the Southeast Asia Mathematical Society from 1998 to 1999. She became a full professor at the university in 2000, and retired to become a professor emeritus in 2019.

In 1988 the Philippine National Academy of Science and Technology gave Sy their Outstanding Young Scientist Award and in 1992 they gave her their Science Prize. In 2013 the Institute of Mathematics of the University of the Philippines Diliman held a workshop in honor of Sy's 60th birthday.
