= Gerald Polley =

American singer

Gerald A. Polley (January 29, 1947 – July 4, 2012) was an American political campaigner, singer, animator and alleged psychic who resided in Bismarck, North Dakota. He was married to Linda Polley, who shares his political and religious views.

Polley grew up in Maine, before moving to North Dakota in 1999. He founded the religion of Spiritism, which according to him and his wife is based on a faith that originated 500,000 years ago on a planet named Hades and was brought to Earth by extraterrestrial colonizers, who died in a cataclysmic event remembered in human legend as the Great Flood.

The Polleys claimed to be in contact with God, Jesus and Muhammad, along with the spirits of such well-known figures as John Lennon, Princess Diana, Patrick Troughton and Bach.

Gerald and Linda Polley created a body of work including songs, drawings and short animations, some of which they claimed was made while channelling the spirits of dead artists. Some of this work is political in nature: "Hussein's Butt Song", allegedly written by the spirit of John Lennon about Saddam Hussein, has lyrics such as "we kicked his butt before and we kicked his butt again, we got him in the heine, he knew he could not win". Another song, attacking Hillary Clinton and cross-dressing, contains the lyrics "if you want your sons wearing skirts and panty hose, with lipstick on their faces and shiny nail polish that glows, then vote for Hillary".

Music professor Michael Harrington studied the songs allegedly written by Lennon's spirit and, while declining to comment on the Polleys' claims that the pieces were received from the afterlife, concluded that the songs showed melodic similarities to Lennon's work. Joel Bjorling, a specialist in alternative religions, examined three of the Polleys' songs and concluded that one ("Don't Make Heaven Mad") resembled Lennon's songs while the other two resembled American folk songs almost note-for-note. In addition, one commentator has pointed to similarities between "Hussein's Butt Song" and the folk song "Knees Up Mother Brown".

In the run-up to the 2000 presidential election, Gerald Polley claimed that Jesus had left Heaven because Bill Clinton was not impeached, and would only return should George W. Bush win the election. In 2007, Polley decided to try to run as a Republican presidential candidate in the 2008 elections, taking pro-choice and anti-homosexual stances and calling for tougher laws against hiring illegal immigrants. North Dakota Republican Party Chairman Gary Emineth commented in 2007 that he was unsure that Polley was a suitable candidate. According to the Polleys' website, Gerald Polley's presidential campaign ended on 1 October 2008; the following year he announced his plans to attempt another bid for president in 2012.

The Polleys were the subject of a 2002 documentary by filmmaker Barney Snow, titled Where Has Eternity Gone? and also appeared on the 21 February 2004 episode of Jimmy Kimmel Live!.

Gerald Polley died of colon cancer on July 4, 2012 at the age of 65.
