= The Torture Never Stops (video) =

2008 live music dvd by Frank Zappa

An Evening with Frank Zappa During Which... The Torture Never Stops

Video by Frank Zappa
- Released: May 29, 2008
- Recorded: October 31, 1981
- Venues: The Palladium, New York City
- Genres: Rock, progressive rock, comedy rock
- Length: 116:37
- Label: Honker Home Video Digital
- Producers: Bill Boggs; Richard Baker

An Evening with Frank Zappa During Which... The Torture Never Stops is a live DVD by Frank Zappa, posthumously released in 2008.

It is made up of footage from one of Zappa's annual Halloween concerts at The Palladium in New York City on October 31, 1981. Two shows were played that night, and the DVD contains footage from both shows edited together.

== Track listing ==
1. Black Napkins
2. Montana
3. Easy Meat
4. Beauty Knows No Pain
5. Charlie’s Enormous Mouth
6. Fine Girl
7. Teen-age Wind
8. Harder Than Your Husband
9. Bamboozled By Love
10. We’re Turning Again
11. Alien Orifice
12. Flakes
13. Broken Hearts Are for Assholes
14. You Are What You Is
15. Mudd Club
16. The Meek Shall Inherit Nothing
17. Dumb All Over
18. Heavenly Bank Account
19. Suicide Chump
20. Jumbo Go Away
21. Stevie’s Spanking
22. The Torture Never Stops
23. Strictly Genteel
24. The Illinois Enema Bandit

=== Yes, & But Also ===
- Discography
- DVDography
- Liner notes
- Credits

Extras:

- Teen-age Prostitute [early show performance]
- City of Tiny Lites [early show performance]
- You Are What You Is [1981 music video]
- Photo gallery

== Personnel ==
Music performed by

- Frank Zappa – guitar, vocal
- Ray White – guitar, vocal
- Tommy Mars – keyboards, vocal
- Scott Thunes – bass, vocal
- Chad Wackerman – drums
- Ed Mann – percussion, vocal
- Bobby Martin – keyboards, sax, vocal
- Steve Vai – guitar, vocal

Production

- Frank Zappa – editorial supervisor, composer, arranger
- Bill Boggs, Richard Baker – producer
- Clark Santee – director
- Jim Tetlow – lighting director
- Karen McLaughlin – associate producer
- Dee Santee – music associate
- Mark Schubin – technical supervisor
- Malachy Wienges – engineering consultant
- Marty Maloney – production manager
- Keith Kevan – stage manager
- Ed Levine – engineer-in-charge
- Paul Stiegelbauer – technical director
- Mark Pinske – music audio mixer
- Mike Shoskes – production audio mixer
- Mel Becker – audio assistant
- Paul Ranieri – video
- Juan Barrera, Peter Blank, John Feher, Rob Leacock, Mike Lieberman, Jake Ostroff – camera
- Rennie Dicuia – videotape operator
- Chip Foody – gaffer
- Rick Anderson, Andy Burnaford – utility
- Gerald Fialka (credited as Barry Fialk) – electronic graphics
- Sabina Barch, Susan Franks – production assistants
- Unitel Production Services, Inc. – production facilities
- Terry Greene – videotape editor
- Ron Menzies – assistant videotape editor

For Intercontinental Absurdities

- Bennett Glotzer – associate producer
- Alan Santos – production manager
- Coy Featherstone – lighting director
- Mark Pinske, George Douglas, Bob Stone – sound
- Chuck Eldridge – on Jack Daniels
- David Robb – towel boy and kosher guitars
- Larry Griffith – industrial tenderness
- Thomas Nordegg – gadgets
- John Smothers – Iron Sausage
- Wartoke Concern – public relations

=== DVD credits ===
- Frank Zappa – editor, performer, music composer & conductor
- Gail Zappa – DVD ordainment & A/D/D art direction
- Joe Travers – vaultage vaultmeisterment
- Keith Lawler – art design & renderment
- Scott Thunes – liner notes
- Melanie Starks – production management
- ZFT Vault Archives – all assets
- New York DVD – DVD development
- Brian Brodeur – encoding/authoring
- Galo Morales – menu design
