= Baby Snakes =

1979 film by Frank Zappa

- DVD cover
- Directed by: Frank Zappa
- Produced by: Frank Zappa
- Starring: Frank Zappa; Terry Bozzio; Roy Estrada; Adrian Belew; Ed Mann; Patrick O'Hearn; Peter Wolf; Tommy Mars; and New York's Finest Crazy Persons
- Cinematography: Dick Pearce; Phil Parmet; Rob Leacock
- Edited by: Klaus Hundsbichler
- Music by: Frank Zappa
- Animation by: Bruce Bickford
- Distributed by: Intercontinental Absurdities
- Release date: December 21, 1979
- Running time: 164 minutes
- Language: English
- Budget: $679,000

Baby Snakes is a film which includes footage from Frank Zappa's 1977 Halloween concerts at the Palladium in New York City. It also includes backstage antics from the crew, and stop motion clay animation from award-winning animator Bruce Bickford.

The film premiered on Zappa's 39th birthday, December 21, 1979, at the Victoria Theater in Manhattan. During this initial New York run it was shown continuously 24 hours a day. During the initial showing it was one of the top grossing films in New York City. (The theater marquee can be seen in the opening credits to the 1980 Italian horror film, Eaten Alive!, partly filmed in New York at the time that Baby Snakes was playing.)

== History ==
Zappa spent his own money on the project and took several months editing the film during 1978. He had difficulty finding a distributor for the film in 1979. He tried to interest United Artists, the company that released 200 Motels, but they declined. Other studios followed United Artists' lead, fearing that Zappa's "cinematic style" had lost considerable appeal in 1970s pop culture, and also declined to distribute the film.

Several European distributors told Zappa that there might be interest if the running time was cut from its original 168-minute length. The film was cut to 90 minutes, but still, there were no takers.

Even after Bruce Bickford's sequences won first prize at a French animated film competition, there was no interest. Eventually Zappa took it upon himself to distribute the film independently, via his own production company, Intercontinental Absurdities.

The film was first released on videocassette in 1983 in a 90-minute edited version with a "sell-through" price of $59.98. This coincided with the original vinyl release of the soundtrack album. The complete 2-hour 45-minute version of the film was released as a double videocassette in 1987, with the soundtrack album being issued on CD around the same time. The full version retailed at $200 and was aimed at rental stores. Both the 1983 and 1987 editions sold out quickly.

Baby Snakes was released on DVD on December 9, 2003, by Eagle Vision United States in its complete unedited form. This version has a four channel Surround sound mix included. The surround mix was created by Zappa for theatrical showings in 1979 but not previously available on home video. This DVD was also the first time that the film was widely distributed to the public.

== Soundtrack ==
The soundtrack album was first released on vinyl in 1983 as a picture disc, and subsequently on compact disc with different artwork.

=== AAAFNRAA: Baby Snakes – The Compleat Soundtrack ===
AAFNRAA: Baby Snakes – The Compleat Soundtrack

Soundtrack album by Frank Zappa
- Released: December 21, 2012
- Recorded: October 28–31, 1977
- Venues: The Palladium, New York City
- Genres: Hard rock; progressive rock; art rock; comedy rock; spoken word
- Length: 164:20
- Label: Zappa Records
- Producer: Frank Zappa

Frank Zappa chronology
Finer Moments (2012)	AAFNRAA: Baby Snakes – The Compleat Soundtrack (2012)	Road Tapes, Venue #2 (2013)

AAAFNRAA: Baby Snakes – The Compleat Soundtrack consists of the entire soundtrack of the film (including all dialogue and sound effects), released to iTunes on Zappa's birthday on December 21, 2012. Of the 136 official releases, it is the only one which is available only as a download.

No.	Title	Length
1.	"Baby Snakes Rehearsal"	2:11
2.	"'This Is the Show They Never See'"	5:52
3.	"Baby Snakes - The Song"	2:04
4.	"Bruce Bickford / 'Disco Outfreakage'"	6:15
5.	"The Poodle Lecture"	5:03
6.	"'She Said' / City of Tiny Lites"	10:28
7.	"New York's Finest Crazy Persons"	1:55
8.	"'The Way the Air Smells…' / Flakes"	4:01
9.	"Pound Bass & Keyboard Solo"	6:36
10.	"'In You' Rap / Dedication"	6:47
11.	"Manuaga / Police Car / Drum Solo"	9:45
12.	"Disco Boy"	4:02
13.	"'Give People Somewhere to X-Scape Thru'"	6:26
14.	"King Kong / Roy's Halloween Gas Mask"	9:01
15.	"Bobby Brown Goes Down"	3:43
16.	"Conehead / 'All You Need to Know'"	5:32
17.	"I'm So Cute / 'Entertainment All the Way'"	5:15
18.	"Titties 'n' Beer"	6:19
19.	"Audience Participation / The Dance Contest"	6:36
20.	"The Black Page #2"	2:55
21.	"Jones Crusher"	2:53
22.	"Broken Hearts Are for Assholes"	3:50
23.	"Punky's Whips"	12:10
24.	"'Thank You' / Dinah-Moe-Humm"	7:19
25.	"Camarillo Brillo"	3:26
26.	"Muffin Man"	4:59
27.	"San Ber'dino"	5:02
28.	"Black Napkins"	7:54
29.	"New York's Finest Crazy Persons 2"	4:09
30.	"'Good Night'"	1:22

== Reception ==
The New York Times called it "a shapeless and inexcusably-long concert film made by, and about, Frank Zappa". Movie historian Leonard Maltin considered the picture "Excruciating...In every fifth shot, Frankie is in closeup; either that or a fan runs up, kisses him, and screeches for joy. Zappa the producer should have fired Zappa the director, although Zappa the editor did cut the running time in half for a reissue 5 years later. The film's sole virtue is its clay animation."

== See also ==
- List of American films of 1979
