= The Baby Smurf =

Twelfth album in the series The Smurfs

The Baby Smurf (Le Bébé Schtroumpf)
- Cover of the French-language version
- Creator: Peyo
- Date: October 1984
- Series: The Smurfs
- Page count: 47 pages
- Publisher: Dupuis

Original publication
- Language: French

Chronology
- Preceded by: The Olympic Smurfs (1983)
- Followed by: The Smurflings (1988)

The Baby Smurf (original French title: Le Bébé Schtroumpf) is the twelfth album of the original French-language Smurfs comic series created by Belgian artist Peyo.

Apart from the titular story, it contains three more: The Handy Smurf, The Smurf Paint and A Smurfy Party.

== Plots ==
=== The Baby Smurf ===
During a blue moon night, a stork leaves a baby Smurf at the door of a Smurf house and leaves. The Smurfs quickly hand the baby to one another until he ends up with Smurfette. The next day, all the Smurfs converge to see the baby, save for Grouchy Smurf, who hates baby Smurfs. Brainy Smurf asks if the baby is Smurfette's, which offends her.

The baby is adopted by all Smurfs (save for Grouchy). Handy Smurf makes a bed for the baby, including a machine to swing it, but Papa Smurf opts for swinging the bed at hand. Greedy Smurf bakes a cake for Baby Smurf, but Smurfette tells him that Baby is too small for cakes. Other Smurfs wash Baby's dirty clothes. When Baby sees Grouchy passing, he tries to imitate his gruff expression, which seems to mellow Grouchy down, but he fakes apathy when Smurfette asks him to carry the baby. Brainy asks Papa Smurf where the baby Smurfs come from, but Papa's answer is so complicated that he still doesn't understand anything. At night, Baby Smurf's crying doesn't let any Smurf sleep.

The next day, the Smurfs prepare a party in Baby Smurf's honor, but the stork arrives with a note saying that Baby was a "delivery error" and must be taken away. Everybody is upset including Smurfette who goes into a non stop crying spree, but they don't have any option but return the baby. However, they soon find that Grouchy Smurf has escaped with the baby. The Smurfs seek for Grouchy and Baby throughout the forest. Grouchy manages to avert being found, but then he decides to return to the village after noticing the many dangers Baby would face in the forest as well as Baby Smurf falling ill by catching a cold.

After the Smurfs give Baby back to the stork, life in the village turns sad; even Jokey Smurf and the Smurf getting his trademark explosive present try to laugh but end crying. That same night, the stork returns with Baby, with a note saying that Grouchy Smurf's care for the baby has caused the baby to be allowed to stay with the Smurfs.

=== The Handy Smurf ===
Handy Smurf creates a drill, but he begins to try it on everything (the water pump, Harmony Smurf's flute, etc.), which causes trouble for the Smurfs' daily lives. When he's found out, the other Smurfs catch him and make a new invention to get revenge on him: a rotating kicking machine that keeps kicking Handy himself.

=== The Smurf Paint ===
The Smurfs try to paint the village to restore it, and some of them add their "personal touch" to the labor. Several Smurfs have difficulties painting, so Handy Smurf creates a paint-spraying system, which he makes work with Harmony Smurf's help.

Meanwhile, Gargamel creates an invisible paint, and uses it on himself to follow some Smurfs to the village. While Papa Smurf goes to his lab to make a formula against Gargamel, Handy and Harmony spray paint on Gargamel, making him visible. Gargamel, blinded by the paint, goes stumbling back at his own house. He decides to use a formula to become a dragon, but accidentally drops the remaining invisible paint on the book with the formula.

At the village, Papa Smurf still works on his formula, not knowing that Gargamel has already left.

=== A Smurfy Party ===
Gargamel finds that the Smurfs are organizing a party, so he disguises as a bunny to ask them to invite him. The Smurfs immediately recognise Gargamel, but bring him (blindfolded) to the village to give him a lesson. Papa Smurf drops a starch solution on Gargamel, who is immobilised. The party continues until a sudden rain dissolves the solution and Gargamel gets free. However, a Smurf ties Gargamel's feet to a rocket that sends him away to the forest, where a fox sees the bunny-disguised Gargamel and starts chasing him.

== Publication and other media ==
- This book takes several details from the Smurfs TV series, due to the fact that it adapts an episode of said series:
  - Smurfette lives in the Smurf Village.
  - In the episode Once In A Blue Moon Smurfette wrote an angry letter protesting the return of Baby Smurf to the "creators" instead of going into an uncontrollable crying spree.
  - Most of the Smurfs begin to use personalized costumes (Handy with overalls, Vanity with a flower on his hat, etc.). Baker Smurf and Vanity Smurf had sporadically used their "own" costumes before, but from this album on, it becomes permanent.
  - The Smurf in Baker attires is Greedy Smurf. Later stories show Baker and Greedy as separate characters.
