= The Smurfs in film =

Films based on The Smurfs

The Smurfs
- Logo used for the 2011–2013 films and short films
- Created by: Peyo
- Original work: Les Aventures des Schtroumpfs (1965)
- Owners: Studio Peyo; Sony Pictures Animation (Sony Pictures) (The Smurfs, The Smurfs 2, The Lost Village); Paramount Animation (Paramount Pictures) (Skydance Corporation) (Smurfs)
- Years: 1965–present

Films and television
- Films: 1960s; Les Aventures des Schtroumpfs; "The Smurfnapper"; "The Smurfs and the Magic Egg"; "The Black Smurfs"; "The Smurfs and the Dragon"; "The Flying Smurf"; 1970s; The Smurfs and the Magic Flute; 2010s; The Smurfs; The Smurfs 2; The Lost Village; 2020s; Smurfs
- Short films: The Smurfs: A Christmas Carol; The Smurfs: The Legend of Smurfy Hollow

The Smurfs have appeared in six feature-length films and two short films loosely based on The Smurfs comic book series created by the Belgian comics artist Peyo and the 1980s animated TV series it spawned.

They theatrically debuted in a 1965 animated feature film that was followed by a 1976 animated film titled The Smurfs and the Magic Flute. Twenty-eight to thirty years after The Magic Flute was released in the United States, a 2011 feature film and a 2013 sequel were produced by Sony Pictures Animation and released by Columbia Pictures. Live-action roles include Hank Azaria, Neil Patrick Harris, and Jayma Mays, while the voice-over roles include Anton Yelchin, Jonathan Winters, Katy Perry, and George Lopez. A fully animated reboot titled Smurfs: The Lost Village was released through Sony in April 2017. A live-action animated musical reboot titled Smurfs, produced by Paramount Animation, was released in July 2025.

== Films ==
=== Films produced in Franco-Belgium ===
==== Les Aventures des Schtroumpfs (1965) ====
The film consists of five black-and-white shorts made in the previous years for broadcasting on Walloon TV: Smurfnapped: A Smurf gets himself captured by Gargamel. Now, the rest of the Smurfs must save him before he gets killed.; The Smurfs and the Magic Egg: The Smurfs discover a magic egg. But they don't know it has been created by Gargamel.; The Black Smurfs: A contagious disease terrorizes the village.; The Smurfs and the Dragon: The Smurfs befriend a domesticated dragon.; The Flying Smurf: One of the Smurfs attempt to fly like a bird.

==== The Smurfs and the Magic Flute (1975) ====
Released in Belgium and Switzerland in 1975, The Smurfs and the Magic Flute was the first Smurfs animated feature in colour. It was subsequently released in the United Kingdom in 1979 and the United States in 1983, in the wake of the characters' newfound popularity.

=== Films produced in America ===
==== Sony Pictures Animation films (2011–2017) ====
===== The Smurfs (2011) =====
The Smurfs is a 2011 live-action animated comedy film and the first computer-animated film in the series, directed by Raja Gosnell. In their race to escape the malevolent wizard Gargamel, the little blue forest dwellers find themselves suddenly transported to Central Park. Now stuck in a world populated by towering giants, the Smurfs must find a way to elude Gargamel and find a way back to the village they call home.

===== The Smurfs 2 (2013) =====
A sequel titled The Smurfs 2 was released on July 31, 2013. Director Raja Gosnell and producer Jordan Kerner returned, along with all of the main cast. New cast members include Christina Ricci, J. B. Smoove and Brendan Gleeson. In the sequel, Gargamel creates a couple of evil Smurf-like creatures called the Naughties to harness the magical Smurf-essence. When he discovers that only a real Smurf can give him what he wants and that only Smurfette can turn the Naughties into real Smurfs, Gargamel kidnaps her and takes her to Paris. Papa, Clumsy, Grouchy, and Vanity return to the human world and seek the help of their friends Patrick and Grace Winslow to rescue Smurfette from Gargamel. It was Jonathan Winters' final film after his death on April 11, 2013.

===== The Smurfs 3 (cancelled) =====
By May 10, 2012, just two weeks after production of The Smurfs 2 was announced, Sony Pictures Animation and Columbia Pictures had already been developing a script for The Smurfs 3, with writers Karey Kirkpatrick and Chris Poche. Hank Azaria, who played the live-action Gargamel, said that the third film "might actually deal with the genuine origin of how all these characters ran into each other way back when." In March 2014, Sony announced that, instead of a third live action film, it would be rebooting the series with a completely animated film.

===== Smurfs: The Lost Village (2017) =====
Smurfs: The Lost Village is a 2017 American animated fantasy adventure comedy film produced by Sony Pictures Animation and The Kerner Entertainment Company for Columbia Pictures. Kelly Asbury was hired to direct the animated film. Exploring the origins of Smurfs, the comedy-adventure features a new take on the characters, with designs and environments more closely following the artwork created by Peyo. The film was initially set to be released on August 14, 2015, but in May 2014, the film's release date was pushed back to August 5, 2016. In January 2015, The Hollywood Reporter reported that Mandy Patinkin was in final negotiations to voice Papa Smurf in the film. Two months later, the release date had been pushed back to March 31, 2017, in order to work on "a story that was not fully in the place," and take advantage of the Easter weekend. On June 14, 2015, Sony Pictures Animation revealed Get Smurfy as title of the film. In addition to Patinkin, Demi Lovato was cast as Smurfette, and Rainn Wilson as Gargamel. The film was ultimately released on April 7, 2017, to mixed reviews, but was seen by both critics and audiences as an improvement over the live action films.

==== Paramount Pictures films ====
===== Smurfs (2025) =====
On February 7, 2022, it was reported that LAFIG Belgium and IMPS, the owners of the Smurfs brand, had agreed to a partnership with Paramount Animation and Nickelodeon Movies to produce multiple animated Smurfs films, with the first project being an animated musical film. Pam Brady is set to write the screenplay, with production set to begin later that year for release on December 20, 2024. On June 14, 2022, it was announced that former DreamWorks Animation veteran Chris Miller would direct the musical film. In August, it was delayed to February 14, 2025, with Sonic the Hedgehog 3 taking its previous release date. On April 27, 2023, at CinemaCon, it was announced that Barbadian singer Rihanna would be voicing Smurfette, as well as producing the film along with writing and recording original songs for the movie. The title was reported to be The Smurfs Movie. Later, it was renamed as The Smurfs Musical. The title was officially revealed as The Smurfs Movie during CinemaCon in April 2024, alongside Nick Offerman, Natasha Lyonne, JP Karliak, Dan Levy, Amy Sedaris, Nick Kroll, James Corden, Octavia Spencer, Hannah Waddingham, Sandra Oh, Alex Winter, Billie Lourd, Xolo Maridueña, Kurt Russell, and John Goodman joining the cast. On October 4, 2024, the film's release date was delayed to July 18, 2025. Following the release of the first trailer in February 2025, it was revealed that the film would be simply titled Smurfs.

=== Short films ===
==== The Smurfs: A Christmas Carol ====
A Christmas television special, titled The Smurfs: A Christmas Carol was released on DVD on December 2, 2011, attached to The Smurfs.

==== The Smurfs: The Legend of Smurfy Hollow ====
The Smurfs: The Legend of Smurfy Hollow is a 22-minute animated Halloween television special, based on the Washington Irving's short story The Legend of Sleepy Hollow. It premiered on June 11, 2013, at the Annecy International Animated Film Festival, and was released on DVD on September 10, 2013, followed by a TV premiere in October. It was directed by Stephan Franck, and it features the voices of Melissa Sturm, Alan Cumming, Fred Armisen, Anton Yelchin and Hank Azaria. Like the first special, The Legend of Smurfy Hollow combines computer-generated animation and traditionally hand-drawn animation, with the latter provided by Duck Studios.

== Cast and characters ==
List indicators

This section includes characters who have appeared in the series in notable roles.

- An empty grey cell indicates the character was not in the film.
- ^{E} indicates an appearance not included in the theatrical cut.
- ^{P} indicates an appearance in onscreen photographs.
- ^{U} indicates an uncredited appearance.
- ^{D} indicates an actor or actress provided the voice of a character in other territories.

Characters	Theatrical films					Short films	
Characters	The Smurfs and the Magic Flute	The Smurfs	The Smurfs 2	Smurfs: The Lost Village	Smurfs	The Smurfs: A Christmas Carol	The Smurfs: The Legend of Smurfy Hollow
Smurfs
Smurfette		Katy Perry	Katy Perry	Demi Lovato	Rihanna	Melissa Sturm	Melissa Sturm
Papa	Michel Elias Bill Owen^{D} (Note: Owen voices Papa Smurf in the UK dub.) Bill Capizzi^{D} (Note: Capizzi voices Papa Smurf in the first version of the US dub.) Michael Sorich^{D} (Note: Sorich voices Papa Smurf in the second version of the US dub.)	Jonathan Winters	Jonathan Winters	Mandy Patinkin	John Goodman	Jack Angel	Jack Angel
Brainy	Jacques Marin Star X. Phifer^{D}	Fred Armisen	Fred Armisen	Danny Pudi	Xolo Maridueña	Fred Armisen	Fred Armisen
Hefty	John Rust^{D}	Gary Basaraba	Gary Basaraba	Joe Manganiello	Alex Winter	Gary Basaraba	Gary Basaraba
Grouchy	Michel Elias John Rust^{D}	George Lopez	George Lopez	Jake Johnson	Chris Miller Jon Richardson (Note: Voices the character in the UK.)	George Lopez	
Clumsy	Silent role	Anton Yelchin	Anton Yelchin	Jack McBrayer	Hugo Miller	Anton Yelchin	Anton Yelchin
Handy	Unspecified voice actor (Note: Referred to as "Handyman Smurf".)	Jeff Foxworthy	Jeff Foxworthy	Bret Marnell	Silent role	Unspecified voice actor	
Vanity		John Oliver	John Oliver	Tituss Burgess	Maya Erskine Rylan Clark (Note: Voices the character in the UK.)		John Oliver
Baker		B. J. Novak	B. J. Novak	Gordon Ramsay	Jonny Manganello		
Jokey		Paul Reubens	Paul Reubens	Gabriel Iglesias	Silent role		
Farmer		Joel McCrary	Joel McCrary	Jeff Dunham	Silent role		
Greedy	Patty Foley	Kenan Thompson	Kenan Thompson		Silent role		
Gutsy		Alan Cumming	Alan Cumming				Alan Cumming
Narrator		Tom Kane	Tom Kane				Tom Kane
Crazy		John Kassir	John Kassir				
Chef		Wolfgang Puck		Deleted scene		Unspecified voice actor	
Vexy			Christina Ricci				Silent cameo
Hackus			J. B. Smoove				Silent cameo
Social			Mario Lopez				
Smooth			Shaquille O'Neal				
Clueless			Shaun White				
Panicky			Adam Wylie				Adam Wylie
Party Planner			Kevin Lee				
Passive-Aggressive			Jimmy Kimmel				
Smurfblossom				Ellie Kemper			
Smurfstorm				Michelle Rodriguez			
Smurfwillow				Julia Roberts			
Smurfily				Ariel Winter			
Nosey				Kelly Asbury			
No Name / Magic					James Corden		
Ken					Nick Offerman		
Moxie					Sandra Oh		
Ron					Kurt Russell		
Worry					Billie Lourd		
Sound Effect					Spencer X		
Humans
Gargamel		Hank Azaria	Hank Azaria	Rainn Wilson	JP Karliak	Hank Azaria	Hank Azaria
Sir Johan (Note: Referred to as "John" in the UK, and the first version of the US dub, while the second version of the US dub retains his original name.)	William Coryn Vernon Morris^{D} Grant Gottschall^{D}						
Peewit (Note: Referred to as "William" in the UK dub, and as "Pee-Wee" in both versions of the US dub.)	Michel Modo Stuart Lock^{D} Cam Clarke^{D}						
Matthew "Oily" McCreep	Albert Médina Mike Reynolds^{D}						
The King	Georges Pradez Dudley Knight^{D}						
Mortaille	Jacques Dynam Ron Gans^{D}						
Homnibus	Henri Crémieux Harry Dickman^{D} Ted Lehman^{D}						
Merchant	Angelo Bardi Richard Ashley^{D} Star X. Phifer^{D}						
Patrick Winslow		Neil Patrick Harris	Neil Patrick Harris				
Grace Winslow		Jayma Mays	Jayma Mays				
Odile Anjelou		Sofía Vergara					
Henri		Tim Gunn					
Blue Winslow		Nicholas Martorell, Jr.^{P}	Jacob Tremblay				
Victor Doyle			Brendan Gleeson				
Razamel					JP Karliak		
Joel					Daniel Levy		
Asmodius					Octavia Spencer		
Chernobog					Nick Kroll		
Jezebeth					Hannah Waddingham		
Animals
Azrael		Mr. Krinkles Frank Welker	Mr. Krinkles Cheeto^{U} FG^{U} Frank Welker	Frank Welker	Rachel Butera	Animal sounds only	Frank Welker
Elway		Hank	Hank				
Snappy Bug				Bret Marnell			
Monty				Dee Bradley Baker			
Frank				Patrick Ballin			
Turtle					Marshmello		

- A gray cell indicates the character did not appear in that medium.

== Crew ==
Film	Year	Director(s)	Producer(s)	Writer(s)	Cinematographer	Composer	Editor
Les Aventures des Schtroumpfs	1965	Eddy Ryssack; Maurice Rosy	Charles Dupuis	Yvan Delporte; Peyo; André Franquin	Raoul Cauvin; Norbert Declercq	Roland Renerte	—N/a
The Smurfs and the Magic Flute	1976	José Detillieu	José Detillieu	Peyo; Yvan Delporte	—N/a	Michel Legrand	Nibela Ben Mihad; Michèle Neny
The Smurfs	2011	Raja Gosnell	Jordan Kerner	David N. Weiss; J. David Stem; David Ronn; Jay Scherick	Phil Meheux	Heitor Pereira	Sabrina Plisco
The Smurfs 2	2013	Raja Gosnell	Jordan Kerner	J. David Stem; David N. Weiss; David Ronn; Jay Scherick; Karey Kirkpatrick	Phil Meheux	Heitor Pereira	Sabrina Plisco
Smurfs: The Lost Village	2017	Kelly Asbury	Jordan Kerner; Mary Ellen Bauder Andrews	Pamela Ribon; Stacey Harman	—N/a	Christopher Lennertz	Bret Marnell
Smurfs	2025	Chris Miller	Ryan Harris; Rihanna; Laurence "Jay" Brown; Tyran "Ty-Ty" Smith	Pam Brady	Peter Lyons Collister	Henry Jackman; Rihanna	Matt Landon

== Reception ==
=== Box office performance ===
Film	Release date	Box office gross			Box office ranking		Budget (millions)	Ref(s)
Film	Release date	North America	Other territories	Worldwide	All time North America	All time worldwide	Budget (millions)	Ref(s)
Les Aventures des Schtroumpfs	1965							
The Smurfs and the Magic Flute	25 November 1983	$11,234,220	$7,765,780	$19,000,000	#5,045	#7,078		
The Smurfs	July 29, 2011	$142,614,158	$421,135,165	$563,749,323	#442	#194	$110	
The Smurfs 2	July 31, 2013	$71,017,784	$276,416,394	$347,434,178	#1,215	#442	$105	
Smurfs: The Lost Village	April 7, 2017	$45,020,282	$152,163,264	$197,183,546	#2,022	#911	$60	
Total		$269,886,444	$857,480,603	$1,127,367,047			$275	
List indicator: A dark grey cell indicates the information is not available for the film.

=== Critical and public response ===
Film	Rotten Tomatoes	Metacritic	CinemaScore
Les Aventures des Schtroumpfs	—N/a	—N/a	—N/a
The Smurfs and the Magic Flute	—N/a	—N/a	—N/a
The Smurfs	21% (117 reviews)	30 (22 reviews)	A-
The Smurfs 2	14% (94 reviews)	34 (30 reviews)	A-
Smurfs: The Lost Village	41% (97 reviews)	40 (25 reviews)	A
Smurfs	21% (71 reviews)	32 (25 reviews)	B+
