= Smurfs: The Lost Village =

2017 film by Kelly Asbury

- Theatrical release poster
- Directed by: Kelly Asbury
- Written by: Stacey Harman; Pamela Ribon
- Based on: The Smurfs by Peyo
- Produced by: Jordan Kerner; Mary Ellen Bauder Andrews
- Starring: Demi Lovato; Rainn Wilson; Joe Manganiello; Jack McBrayer; Danny Pudi; Michelle Rodriguez; Ellie Kemper; Ariel Winter; Meghan Trainor; Mandy Patinkin; Julia Roberts
- Edited by: Bret Marnell
- Music by: Christopher Lennertz
- Production companies: Columbia Pictures; Sony Pictures Animation; The Kerner Entertainment Company
- Distributed by: Sony Pictures Releasing
- Release date: April 7, 2017 (United States)
- Running time: 89 minutes
- Country: United States
- Language: English
- Budget: $60 million
- Box office: $197.6 million

Smurfs: The Lost Village is a 2017 American animated fantasy adventure comedy film based on The Smurfs comic series by the Belgian comics artist Peyo. A reboot of Sony Pictures Animation's previous live-action animated hybrid films, the film was directed by Kelly Asbury and written by Stacey Harman and Pamela Ribon, and stars the voices of Demi Lovato, Rainn Wilson, Joe Manganiello, Jack McBrayer, Danny Pudi, Michelle Rodriguez, Ellie Kemper, Ariel Winter, Mandy Patinkin and Julia Roberts. In the film, a mysterious map prompts Smurfette, Brainy, Clumsy, and Hefty to find a lost village before Gargamel does.

On May 10, 2012, two weeks after they announced production of The Smurfs 2, Sony Pictures Animation and Columbia Pictures were already developing a script for The Smurfs 3, with writers Karey Kirkpatrick and Chris Poche. Plans for a third live-action film were cancelled in favor of an animated reboot. Kelly Asbury was confirmed as director in March 2014, and the voice cast was announced throughout the first half of 2015. The film is dedicated to Jonathan Winters, the voice actor of both Grandpa Smurf from the 1980s animated series and Papa Smurf from the original movie series who died in 2013, as well as Anton Yelchin, the voice actor of Clumsy Smurf in the live-action movies, and Nine Culliford, the wife of Peyo, both of whom died in 2016.

Smurfs: The Lost Village was theatrically released in the United States on April 7, 2017, by Sony Pictures Releasing. The film received mixed reviews from critics, and grossed $197 million against a $60 million budget. A computer-animated Smurfs series inspired by The Lost Village premiered in 2021, while a further animated reboot, titled Smurfs, was released in 2025.

== Plot ==
The Smurfs are small blue people who reside peacefully in Smurf Village. Their only female, Smurfette, was created by their archenemy Gargamel to destroy them, but was redeemed by Papa Smurf and became part of the village. She feels that she does not fit in as she tries to find her purpose in life, which the other Smurfs have.

While smurfboarding, Smurfette encounters a mysterious masked creature until she is captured and taken to Gargamel's lair. There, she accidentally reveals a hat the creature dropped before going into the Forbidden Forest, enabling Gargamel to create a brew that causes him to locate a village of Smurfs. Hefty, Brainy, and Clumsy help Smurfette escape, and they return to Smurf Village, where Papa confines them to their houses as punishment for almost disobeying his orders. That night, Smurfette sneaks out to go look for the lost village in the Forbidden Forest to warn its inhabitants of Gargamel's arrival, with Hefty, Brainy, and Clumsy volunteering to join her. Gargamel discovers them trying to find the village, and heads out with his pet cat Azrael and vulture Monty to stop them. Meanwhile, Papa discovers they are gone and angrily sets off to find them.

The next morning, the Smurfs sail across a river using a handmade raft. Following a brief chase, they rescue a drowning Gargamel. However, Gargamel betrays them by pushing them off the raft, as they plunge down a waterfall. They are soon attacked and captured by a group of female Smurfs who reveal themselves to be inhabitants of the lost village. They are taken to Smurfy Grove, and meet Smurfblossom, Smurfstorm, Smurflily, and their leader, Smurfwillow, who all welcome the Smurfs to their home. Storm and Clumsy head to locate Gargamel and alert the others. During the trip, Clumsy accidentally reveals that Smurfette was created by Gargamel, which causes Storm to distrust Smurfette.

Meanwhile, Gargamel, Azrael, and Monty are led to the Swamp of No Return, a piranha-infested lake. They spot Clumsy and Storm in the sky with Storm's dragonfly, Spitfire. Monty attacks them in a dogfight, but is defeated before the Smurfs fly back to the village. Smurfette grows accustomed to life in Smurfy Grove, to the dismay of Hefty and Brainy. Storm and Clumsy return with Spitfire, revealing that Smurfette was created by Gargamel, and the female Smurfs prepare for an impending attack that night. Gargamel suddenly invades and destroys Smurfy Grove, capturing every Smurf. Smurfette is spared because she is not a real Smurf, and thus, is of no use to Gargamel, leaving her crying in the ruins of Smurfy Grove. She soon gets an idea and travels back to Gargamel's lair to face him.

At Gargamel's lair, every Smurf has been imprisoned as Gargamel prepares a machine capable of extracting their essence. The Smurfs attempt to escape using a plan from Brainy until Gargamel spots them, puts them all into his machine, and gains power from their essence. Smurfette arrives and deceives Gargamel into believing she wants to be evil again. Gargamel uses his magic to turn Smurfette evil again, but she instead absorbs his magic. As Smurfette absorbs the magic, she eventually explodes the lair, sending Gargamel, Azrael, and Monty flying back to the Swamp of No Return.

The Smurfs are freed away from their cages, but Smurfette has been turned into clay. Back at Smurf Village, the Smurfs make a memorial for Smurfette and silently mourn her loss. Their energy and love for Smurfette resurrects her. The Smurfs and Smurfettes celebrate the defeat of Gargamel, with Smurfette finding her purpose, to be anything she wants to be.

== Voice cast ==
- Demi Lovato as Smurfette, a Smurf who was created by the wizard Gargamel and the main protagonist of the film. Surrounded by male Smurfs who each have a clear role in the village, she becomes curious about her own purpose, and betrays Gargamel to join with them.
- Mandy Patinkin as Papa Smurf, the fatherly Smurf chief leader of Smurf Village and narrator, who does not want his children entering the Forbidden Forest.
- Joe Manganiello as Hefty Smurf, a strong Smurf who tends to annoy Brainy and has a crush on Smurfette.
- Jack McBrayer as Clumsy Smurf, an accident-prone but good-natured Smurf who tends to panic.
- Danny Pudi as Brainy Smurf, a book-smart Smurf who butts heads with Hefty and gets annoyed by his antics.
- Julia Roberts as Smurfwillow, the motherly Smurf leader of Smurfy Grove and Papa Smurf's love interest.
- Rainn Wilson as Gargamel, an evil wizard who seeks to find the Smurfs and steal their magic in order to become the greatest evil wizard in the world.
- Ellie Kemper as Smurfblossom, an energetic and friendly girl Smurf who quickly befriends Smurfette.
- Michelle Rodriguez as Smurfstorm, a tough, tomboyish girl Smurf who sometimes does not trust Smurfette because she was created by the wizard Gargamel to undermine the Smurfs.
- Ariel Winter as Smurflily, a smart and gentle girl Smurf.
- Meghan Trainor as Smurfmelody, a musical girl Smurf.
- Jake Johnson as Grouchy Smurf, a Smurf who is always grouchy and ill-tempered.
- Gordon Ramsay as Baker Smurf, a Smurf who bakes cakes.
- Tituss Burgess as Vanity Smurf, a Smurf who is obsessed with his looks.
- Gabriel Iglesias as Jokey Smurf, a Smurf who plays pranks on others, usually in the form of "gifts".
- Jeff Dunham as Farmer Smurf, a Smurf who is a farmer.
- Kelly Asbury as Nosey Smurf, a Smurf who peeks in on private activities.
- Alan Mechem as Passerby Smurf
- Danik Thomas as Karate Smurf
- Patrick Ballin as Patient Smurf and Frank the Caterpillar.
- Bret Marnell as Handy Smurf, a Smurf who builds stuff and makes inventions.
  - Marnell also voices Snappy Bug, Brainy's ladybug assistant.
- Frank Welker as Azrael, Gargamel's sardonic pet cat. Welker reprises his role from the live-action movies and The Smurfs: The Legend of Smurfy Hollow.
- Dee Bradley Baker as Monty, Gargamel's dimwitted but ruthless pet vulture.
- Melissa Sturm as Smurf Jade. Sturm previously voiced Smurfette in The Smurfs: A Christmas Carol and The Smurfs: The Legend of Smurfy Hollow.

== Production ==
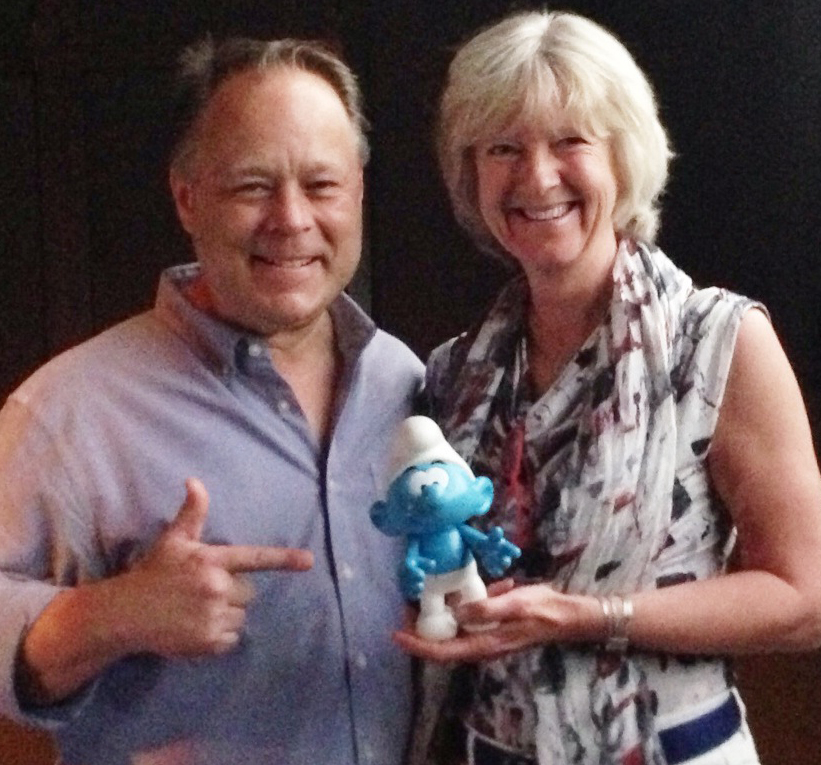
Director Kelly Asbury with Peyo's daughter, Véronique Culliford

On May 10, 2012, two weeks after they announced production of The Smurfs 2, Sony Pictures Animation and Columbia Pictures were already developing a script for The Smurfs 3, with writers Karey Kirkpatrick and Chris Poche. Hank Azaria, who played Gargamel in the first two films, revealed that the third film "might actually deal with the genuine origin of how all these characters ran into each other way back when." Plans for a second sequel were later scrapped, with a completely computer-animated reboot to be produced instead.

Kelly Asbury was confirmed as director in March 2014. It was revealed that the film would explore the origins of the Smurfs, and feature a new take on the characters, with designs and environments more closely following the artwork created by Peyo, the creator of the Smurfs franchise.

Jordan Kerner served as producer, with Mary Ellen Bauder co-producing. On June 14, 2015, Sony Pictures Animation confirmed the original title of Get Smurfy, along with a first look at the film. On February 12, 2016, it was confirmed that the film had been retitled to Smurfs: The Lost Village. LStar Capital and Wanda Pictures co-financed the film.

Asbury cited classic films like Raiders of the Lost Ark (1981) and The Goonies (1985) as his main inspirations. The Forbidden Forest is inspired by the Land of Oz, Pandora and Wonderland, filled with dangerous and magical creatures.

On January 16, 2015, Mandy Patinkin was added to the cast of the animated adventure film to voice Papa Smurf, who was previously voiced by Jonathan Winters in the live-action/CGI films. On June 14, 2015, Demi Lovato was revealed as the voice of Smurfette, and Rainn Wilson as Gargamel. Frank Welker, who voices Gargamel's pet cat Azrael, is the only voice actor to reprise his role from the live-action films.

The film is dedicated to Jonathan Winters (the voice actor of Papa Smurf) and Anton Yelchin (Clumsy Smurf), and Nine Culliford.

== Music ==
Smurfs: The Lost Village (Original Motion Picture Soundtrack)

Soundtrack album by Christopher Lennertz
- Released: March 31, 2017
- Recorded: 2016–2017
- Genre: Film score
- Length: 1:06:29
- Label: Madison Gate
- Producer: Christopher Lennertz

Christopher Lennertz chronology
Kevin Hart: What Now? (2016)	Smurfs: The Lost Village (Original Motion Picture Soundtrack) (2017)	Baywatch (2017)

In October 2016, it was confirmed that Christopher Lennertz would be composing the score for the film. In December 2016, it was reported that singer Meghan Trainor had recorded a song for the film titled "I'm a Lady", which was released as a single. Shaley Scott is featured in two songs, "You Will Always Find Me in Your Heart" and "The Truest Smurf of All".

The soundtrack album was released on March 31, 2017, by Madison Gate Records.

Track listing
No.	Title	Length
1.	"You Will Always Find Me in Your Heart"	4:34
2.	"To the Village"	2:07
3.	"Meet the Smurfs"	2:38
4.	"Gargamel's Lair"	1:45
5.	"Behind the Mask"	1:16
6.	"The Cauldron"	2:07
7.	"Get Those Smurfs!"	2:05
8.	"The Enchanted Forest"	2:18
9.	"Discovering Dragonflies"	1:35
10.	"Freezeball Chase"	2:10
11.	"Rabbit Warren Hoedown"	1:38
12.	"Campfire Stories"	3:28
13.	"Raft Chase"	2:19
14.	"Over the Falls"	2:53
15.	"Captured!"	1:50
16.	"SmurfWillow"	1:41
17.	"They're Coming – Dogfight"	2:59
18.	"Papa and Smurfette"	1:58
19.	"Gargamel Attacks"	3:15
20.	"A Lonely Purpose"	2:07
21.	"Dark Magic"	2:33
22.	"Smurfette Saves the Day"	2:44
23.	"The Truest Smurf of All (feat. Shaley Scott)"	4:57
24.	"End Credit Suite"	3:43
25.	"Smurfs Eating Flowers (Bonus Track)"	0:58
Total length:		1:06:29

== Release ==
=== Theatrical ===
The film was initially set for release on August 14, 2015, but on May 1, 2014, the release date was pushed back to August 5, 2016. In March 2015, the release date was pushed back again to March 31, 2017. In March 2016, the release date was pushed back one final time to April 7, 2017.

=== Home media ===
Smurfs: The Lost Village was released on Blu-ray, Ultra HD Blu-ray, and DVD on July 11, 2017, by Sony Pictures Home Entertainment. The film debuted in second place on the Top 20 NPD VideoScan First Alert chart, behind The Fate of the Furious.

In April 2021, Sony signed a deal giving Disney access to their legacy content to stream on Disney+ and Hulu and appear on Disney's linear television networks. Disney's access to Sony's titles would come following their availability on Netflix.

== Reception ==
=== Box office ===
Smurfs: The Lost Village grossed $45 million in North America and $152.6 million in other territories for a worldwide gross of $197.6 million, against a production budget of $60 million.

In United States and Canada, Smurfs: The Lost Village opened alongside Going in Style and The Case for Christ and was projected to gross around $16–20 million in its opening weekend from 3,602 theaters. It ended up opening to $13.2 million, marking the lowest debut of the Smurfs franchise by a wide margin and finishing 3rd at the box office. Smurfs: The Lost Village completed its theatrical run in the United States and Canada on August 3, 2017.

The movie was deemed as a financial disappointment to the studio. Despite internal optimism and positive audience testing, the film faced strong competition from other movies targeted at the kids & family demographic at the time. Kristine Belson, president of Sony Pictures Animation stated "It was truly heartbreaking. In retrospect we had the wrong date … Honestly, we underestimated what a big hit Boss Baby would be." Attempts to delay the film farther from its final April 2017 date were unsuccessful due to contractual obligations with major promotional partners.

=== Critical response ===
On Rotten Tomatoes, the film holds an approval rating of 41% based on 96 reviews, with an average rating of 4.8/10. The website's critical consensus reads, "Smurfs: The Lost Village may satisfy very young viewers and hardcore Smurfaholics, but its predictable story and bland animation continue the franchise's recent mediocre streak." On Metacritic, the film has a score 40 out of 100, based on 25 critics, indicating "mixed or average reviews". Audiences polled by CinemaScore gave the film an average grade of "A" on an A+ to F scale, an improvement over the "A−" score earned by both previous Smurfs films. In 2018, the film was awarded The ReFrame Stamp in the 2017 Narrative & Animated Feature Recipients category.

Alonzo Duralde of TheWrap wrote, "It's significant that two female writers have taken a character who's mainly just existed to be cute and seductive and turned her into a full-fledged member of this universe." Owen Gleiberman of Variety said, "It's a pure digital fantasy, with elegant and tactile animation, so it's more true to the Smurf spirit, and should perform solidly." Pat Padua of The Washington Post gave the film a 1.5 out of 4 rating, stating that "most people would be better off sticking with Teletubbies." David Ehrlich of IndieWire gave it an unfavorable "D-" grade, praising only a "few small touches (the female Smurfs' voice cast and the adorable insect characters)" while criticizing its "lazy, witless, and creatively vacant execution that leaves it feeling disposable rather than memorable."

Frank Scheck of The Hollywood Reporter wrote, "Smurfs: The Lost Village is a mediocre effort that nonetheless succeeds in its main goal of keeping its blue characters alive for future merchandising purposes." Alex Welch of IGN gave it an unfavorable review, writing, "while it addresses and tries to correct one of the property's most glaring flaws" with a "shockingly relevant and important central theme," it ultimately "feels about as lazy as a children's animated film could ever be" due to its "lackluster visual styles" and a "nonsensical ending." Peter Sobczynski of RogerEbert.com found its "silly" storyline to be "overly familiar" and "lacking in imagination," yet he also offered an unfavorable review, conceding that its "cheerfully surreal visions" and ability to hold a toddler's attention mean it "more or less gets the Smurf job done." Nick De Semlyen of Empire called the film, "A microwave meal of a kid’s film, consisting of tired tropes and bland platitudes", and rated it 2 out of 5 stars.

Peter Bradshaw of The Guardian awarded it two stars out of five, noting that while "loyal fans might enjoy the character dynamics," both the script and animation felt "entirely predictable and software-generated." Simon Brew, from Den of Geek, gave it a favorable review, stating that "Smurfs: The Lost Village is a step up for the franchise with bright, colorful, and lively animation that successfully hammers home positive messages for its very young target audience, even if it doesn't quite work for adults." Barbara VanDenburgh of The Arizona Republic also gave it a positive review, writing, "Smurfs: The Lost Village is a much-needed course correction for the franchise," declaring that it is a "sprightly, brightly colored, age-appropriate adventure" while praising the "bright and simple" animation and its focus on "positive messages delivered by winning characters." Jake Wilson of The Sydney Morning Herald gave it a favorable review, calling it a "sophisticated work of revisionist fan-fiction" that "tackles the problem head-on" while remaining a "harmless" children's film first and foremost.

Peter Hartlaub of The Seattle Times gave the film a rating of 1.5 stars out of 4, writing that while the reboot shows "good intentions" by avoiding crude humor and prioritizing female empowerment, it is ultimately a rushed, "instantly forgettable film" that feels like a "middling half-hour animated TV production" with underwhelming visuals. Sandy Schaefer of Screen Rant gave it a score of 5 out of 10, writing that while "it is a generic, kid-friendly feature" that falls short of similar modern adaptations, it remains an improvement over previous iterations due to its creative fantasy visuals and brisk pacing. Reza Noorani, for The Times of India, gave it a rating of 3 out of 5, praising the "sharp" animation and select vocal performances while heavily criticizing its "insipid and lazy storytelling." Mihir Fadnavis of Firstpost gave it an unfavorable review, writing, "Ultimately, Smurfs: The Lost Village is more of a product than a film, a brand name sold as a commodity, and not a piece of art. For anyone under the age of six, this is a fun pass time at the theater, anyone older than that is advised to look elsewhere for a good animation film." Vicky Roach of Sydney's The Daily Telegraph said it is an action-minded reboot where the "animation really pings," praising its "candy-coloured parallel universe" and describing the experience as "harmless, family-friendly entertainment aimed at younger audiences."

Writing for MovieWeb, Julian Roman offered a mixed-to-positive review, calling it a "hyper-colorful" and "creative" treat for young children that successfully delivers a strong "girl power message," though he noted that the pacing runs a bit long. Kristy Puchko of CBR gave it a negative review, stating that it is a "very loud movie" featuring an "undercooked adventure" and "lackluster humor that offers nothing for parents," while heavily criticizing its "damaging message" regarding its heroine's identity. Tim Robey of The Daily Telegraph described it as an "unappealing, surreal outing that under-eights might thrill to," while noting that the newly introduced female Smurfs "behave like male ones with wigs" rather than a representing a radical innovation. Mike Reyes of CinemaBlend gave it a favorable review, calling it "the film that should have been made initially because it successfully returns the franchise to its source material." However, he noted that the overall experience "feels a bit thin," suggesting the script could have benefited from stronger thematic elements and increased comedic energy. MaryAnn Johanson of Flick Filosopher said that it "actually makes this big mess worse by doubling down on regressive gender notions" and delivers an adventure crammed with "junky, juvenile slapstick" that ultimately fails to offer genuine girl power.

Writing for RTÉ, Alan Corr offered an unfavorable review, calling it "serviceable and bland" while noting that it avoids writing gags for adults to focus purely and simply on younger audiences. Rob Beschizza of Boing Boing also gave it an unfavorable review, praising its animation and progressive feminist messaging while noting that it ultimately suffers from shallow characterizations and forced humor. Anuj Malhotra of Deccan Chronicle gave it a mixed review, writing that while it briefly touches upon sophisticated, self-reflexive imagery regarding death and works as a political allegory, it ultimately "exists in its present form as an approximation" anchored by "vacuous, meaningless ciphers" and an ending that safe-guards convention. However, Pallabi Dey Purkayasth gave it a positive review, describing it as a "3D animation magnum opus" with "colour-rich visuals" that delivers a therapeutic sense of innocence and foundational principles of friendship.

James Croot of Stuff noted that the plot "feels familiar" and questioning the necessity of a rapid reboot. However, he praised its vibrant, energetic presentation, highlighting its "tween-potent combination of brightly coloured visuals, toe-tapping tunes, empowered female protagonists and no shortage of sass." Graeme Tuckett gave it a positive review, writing that the franchise "once again did the business like the all-singing, all-dancing, indigo-skinned, squeaky-voiced and defiantly surreal champion it is," praising its "deliberately hallucinatory" visuals and a script with genuine humor, even if the introduction of the hidden village "takes far too long."

=== Accolades ===
The film was nominated at the 45th Annie Awards, for the category of "Outstanding Achievement for Character Design in an Animated Feature Production" (Patrick Mate).

== Future ==
=== Television series ===
On August 31, 2017, it was announced that IMPS and Dupuis Audiovisuel began production on a new Smurfs TV series, with CGI animation similar to Smurfs: The Lost Village. The series made its world premiere, on RTBF's OUFtivi channel in Belgium, on 18 April 2021. It premiered on Nickelodeon and Nicktoons in September 2021 in the U.S., with other international markets following soon.

=== Paramount Animation reboot ===
On February 7, 2022, it was reported that LAFIG Belgium and IMPS (now known as Peyo Company), the owners of the Smurfs brand, had agreed to a partnership with Paramount Animation and Nickelodeon Movies to produce multiple animated Smurfs films, with the first project being an animated musical film. Pam Brady was set to write the screenplay, with production set to begin later that year for a release on December 20, 2024. On June 14, 2022, it was announced that former DreamWorks Animation veteran Chris Miller would direct the film. In August, it was delayed to February 14, 2025, with Sonic the Hedgehog 3 taking its previous release date. On April 27, 2023, at CinemaCon, it was announced that Barbadian singer Rihanna would be voicing Smurfette, as well as producing the film along with writing and recording original songs for the movie. The title was reported to be The Smurfs Movie. Later, it was renamed as The Smurfs Musical. The title was officially revealed as The Smurfs Movie during CinemaCon in April 2024, alongside Nick Offerman, Natasha Lyonne, JP Karliak, Dan Levy, Amy Sedaris, Nick Kroll, James Corden, Octavia Spencer, Hannah Waddingham, Sandra Oh, Alex Winter, Billie Lourd, Xolo Maridueña, Kurt Russell, and John Goodman joining the voice cast. On October 4, 2024, the film's release date was delayed to July 18, 2025.
