= Russek =

Russek is a surname. Notable people with the surname include:

- Antonio Russek (born 1954), Mexican music composer
- Frank Russek (1875/1876–1948), Polish-born American businessman, co-founder of Russeks
  - Russeks, ladies' fur and clothing department store in New York City, co-founded by Frank
- Jorge Russek (1932–1998), Mexican actor
- Louis Russek (1895–1985), American businessman; founder of Healthtex, a manufacturer of children's clothing
- Estelle Russek-Cohen, American biostatistician
