= Gargamel =

Fictional character from The Smurfs

- An illustration of Gargamel by Peyo in which he is seen taking a Smurf hostage. At bottom left is his cat, Azrael

Publication information
- Publisher: Dupuis
- First appearance: Spirou magazine, 1959
- Created by: Peyo
- Voiced by: Paul Winchell (1981–1989); Hank Azaria (short films; 2011–2013); Tom Zehnder (video games; 2011–2013); Rainn Wilson (2017); Lenny Mark Irons (2021–present); J. P. Karliak (2025)

In-story information
- Partnerships: Azrael; Smurfette (formerly)
- Notable aliases: The Great and Powerful Gargamel
- Abilities: Command of magic

Gargamel is a fictional character and the main antagonist of The Smurfs media franchise created by Belgian cartoonist Peyo. He is depicted as a reclusive sorcerer who, alongside his cat Azrael (French: Azraël), frequently attempts to capture the Smurfs for various purposes. Although the character was intended to be retired after his first appearance, Peyo began incorporating Gargamel in future stories, allowing him to endure as the archenemy of the Smurfs.

In the 2011 motion picture The Smurfs, he is portrayed as wanting the Smurfs' "mystical essence" in order to power his magical wand.

== Appearance and personality ==
Gargamel is depicted as a perpetually stooped man past his prime with rotten teeth and a balding head. He lives in a shack with his feline companion, Azrael, a brown cat that does not speak but exhibits many anthropomorphic personality traits and intelligence. Gargamel has a deep and strong hate for Smurfs, although he is not above pretending to befriend them when it serves his interests. He also frequently insults and mistreats Azrael, who typically responds in kind.

Gargamel made his debut in 'Le Voleur de schtroumpf' ('The Smurfnapper'), published in 1959. His aim is to capture a Smurf, which he intends to use to make a potion capable of transmuting base metals into gold (the Philosopher's Stone). This leads to a confrontation with the other Smurfs, who unite to rescue their kidnapped friend. In the ensuing struggle, the sorcerer is defeated, and vows revenge on the Smurfs.

Gargamel always wishes harm on the Smurfs, however his reasons for doing so differ in various portrayals. In earlier appearances, it is revealed that he wants to use their essence to create gold, to use them as a key ingredient for a recipe, or to annihilate them entirely. In the 2011 feature film, he wants to capture the Smurfs' essence to empower himself.

Gargamel is an inveterate bungler. Some of his schemes to catch Smurfs border on the bizarre (such as a "blue magnet" that attracted solely blue items). Gargamel has rare moments of genius, such as the creation of Smurfette, the sole female Smurf until the introduction of Sassette. Smurfette was intended to work for Gargamel, but betrayed him and joined the Smurfs.

Gargamel has a seemingly endless library of spellbooks ("grimoires"), potions, and gimmicks, including the Great Book of Spells: a sentient book bound by an arrangement requiring it to provide Gargamel with one requested spell per month, during the full moon. The book adheres to the letter of the agreement but often interprets Gargamel's wishes literally, leading him through humiliating rituals and ingredient-gathering tasks. In later appearances, it is suggested that the book's intentions may not be malicious, and it merely disapproves of selfish spellcasting, assisting the Smurfs in resolving magical crises.

Gargamel's design has been criticised for being an antisemitic caricature, featuring a roman nose and beady eyes. Nine Culliford, widow of Smurfs creator Peyo, claimed that the accusations are untrue, saying that he "never took any political or religious stance".

== Actors ==
=== Cartoons ===
Actors who voiced Gargamel in different languages are:

- Arabic: Joseph Nano (Arabic: جوزيف نانو) and Isma'il Na'nou' (Arabic: إسماعيل نعنوع)
- Croatian: Josip Marotti
- Czech: Jiří Císler, Zbyšek Pantůček and Petr Meissel
- Dutch: Paul van Gorcum, Tygo Gernandt
- English: Paul Winchell, Hank Azaria, Tom Zehnder, André Sogliuzzo, Rainn Wilson, Lenny Mark Irons, and J. P. Karliak
- Finnish: Veeti Kallio (1981 series), Mika Nuojua (1981 series and Smurfs: The Lost Village), Jukka Voutilainen (2011 and 2013 movies), Tommi Haapaniemi (2021 series) and Tero Koponen (2025 film)
- French: Philippe Dumat and Emmanuel Curtil (2021 series)
- German: Kurt Goldstein (Season 1–8) and Henry Kielmann (Season 9)
- Greek: Nikos Skiadas, Giorgos Vasiliou and Tasos Kostis (TV series), Ilias Zervos (movies)
- Hebrew: Itsik Seidoff
- Hungarian: Péter Haumann
- Icelandic: Þórhallur Sigurðsson
- Italian: Gastone Pescucci, Claudio Sorrentino, and Paolo Buglioni
- Persian: Mohammadreza Solati
- Polish: Wiesław Drzewicz and Mirosław Wieprzewski (TV series), Jerzy Stuhr (movies)
- Portuguese (Brazil): Orlando Drummond
- Romanian: Șerban Pavlu
- Russia: Dmitry Filimonov (season 1-6), then Ilya Khvostikov (end of season 6, then seasons 7, 8, and 9)
- Serbian: Nikola Simić
- Slovak: Andrej Hryc
- Spanish: Esteban Siller
- Swedish: Steve Kratz
- Turkish: Atilla Olgaç
- Ukrainian: Kyryl Masalov (Ukrainian: Кирил Масалов)
- Uzbek: Elbek Mirzohidov

=== Live-action films ===
Gargamel is played by Hank Azaria in the live-action/animated film series.

=== Animated film ===
Gargamel is voiced by Rainn Wilson in Smurfs: The Lost Village.

== In other media ==
Outside of the comics, Gargamel has appeared in various media, such as in animated and live-action films and most notably in television series. The earliest adaptation of the character was in the 1961 television series, The Smurfs, voiced by an unidentified voice actor. He would then reappear in the 1980s animated television series of the same name (voiced by Paul Winchell) before going on to appear in the 2021 series (voiced by Emmanuel Curtil in the French dub and by Lenny Mark Irons in the English dub) and in the upcoming television special series The Smurfs Adventures.

Gargamel made his film debut in The Smurfs (2011) and in The Smurfs 2 (2013), during which he was portrayed by Hank Azaria, who also voiced the character in animated sequences in the spin-off direct-to-video specials The Smurfs: A Christmas Carol (2011) and The Smurfs: The Legend of Smurfy Hollow (2013).The character would go on to appear in the film Smurfs: The Lost Village (2017, voiced by Rainn Wilson) and in Smurfs (2025, voiced by J. P. Karliak, who also voiced Gargamel's brother Razamel).

== Naming ==
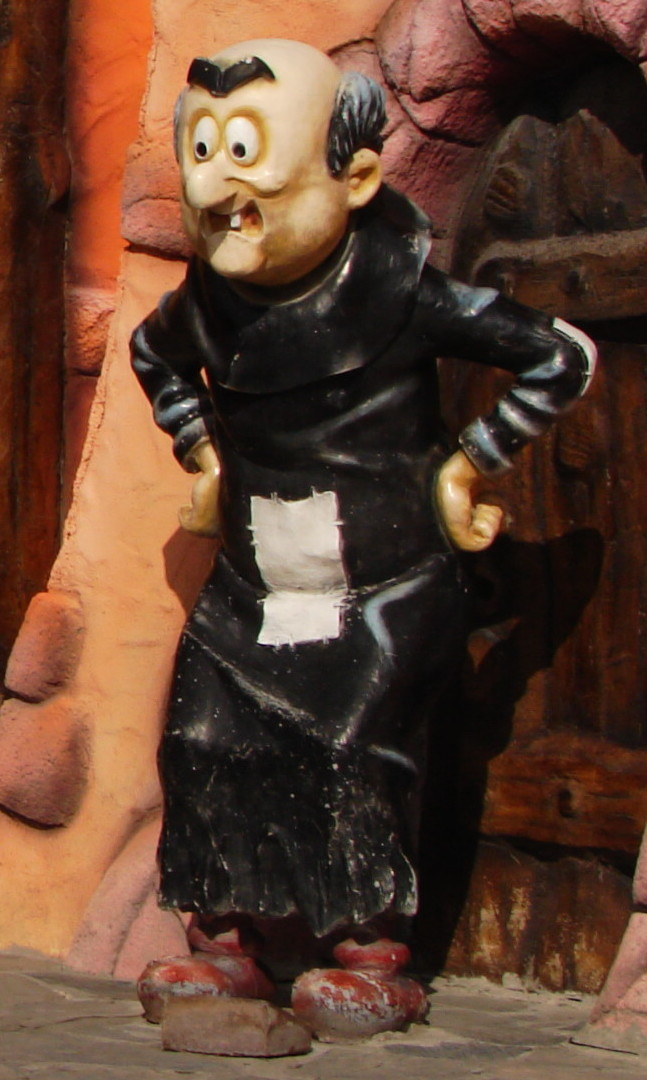
Gargamel figure in Ankara Amusement Park

The name "Gargamel" resembles François Rabelais' classic Gargantua and Pantagruel, where the giantess Gargamelle is the mother of Gargantua. This is appropriate since Gargamel is a giant compared to the Smurfs. The word gargamelle in French is also a slang term for "throat".

Yvan Delporte suggested the name "Gargamel"; he also proposed the name "Azrael", considering "angel of death" an appropriate name for the would-be killer of Smurfs. He also liked the rhyme with Gargamel.

=== Names in other languages ===
In many languages, the name Gargamel is kept in the cartoon series:

- Croatian
- Czech
- Dutch
- Flemish
- Hebrew
- Polish
- Portuguese
- Spanish
- Swedish
- Turkish

However, in some languages, the character's name differs:

- Arabic: شَرشَبيل (Sharshabeel)
- Chinese: Ge Ge Wu 格格巫 (mainland China), Jia Bu Miao 賈不妙 (Taiwan). Both are phono-semantic adaptations.
- Finnish: Velho, directly translated from English word "wizard"
- German: Gurgelhals (literally "throat neck", implying strangling). From 1995 onward, the original name Gargamel is used in Smurf comics publications. In the TV series, Gargamel is used.
- Greek: Δρακουμέλ (Drakoumel)
- Hungarian: Hókuszpók, a wordplay on hocus pocus, with "pók" also meaning spider
- Icelandic: Kjartan
- Italian: Gargamella (phonetic adaptation of the original name)
- Vietnamese: Lão Gà Mên (phonetic adaptation of the original name; "Lão" means old man)

== See also ==
- List of The Smurfs characters
