= Noble (company) =

Production studio based in Los Angeles, California

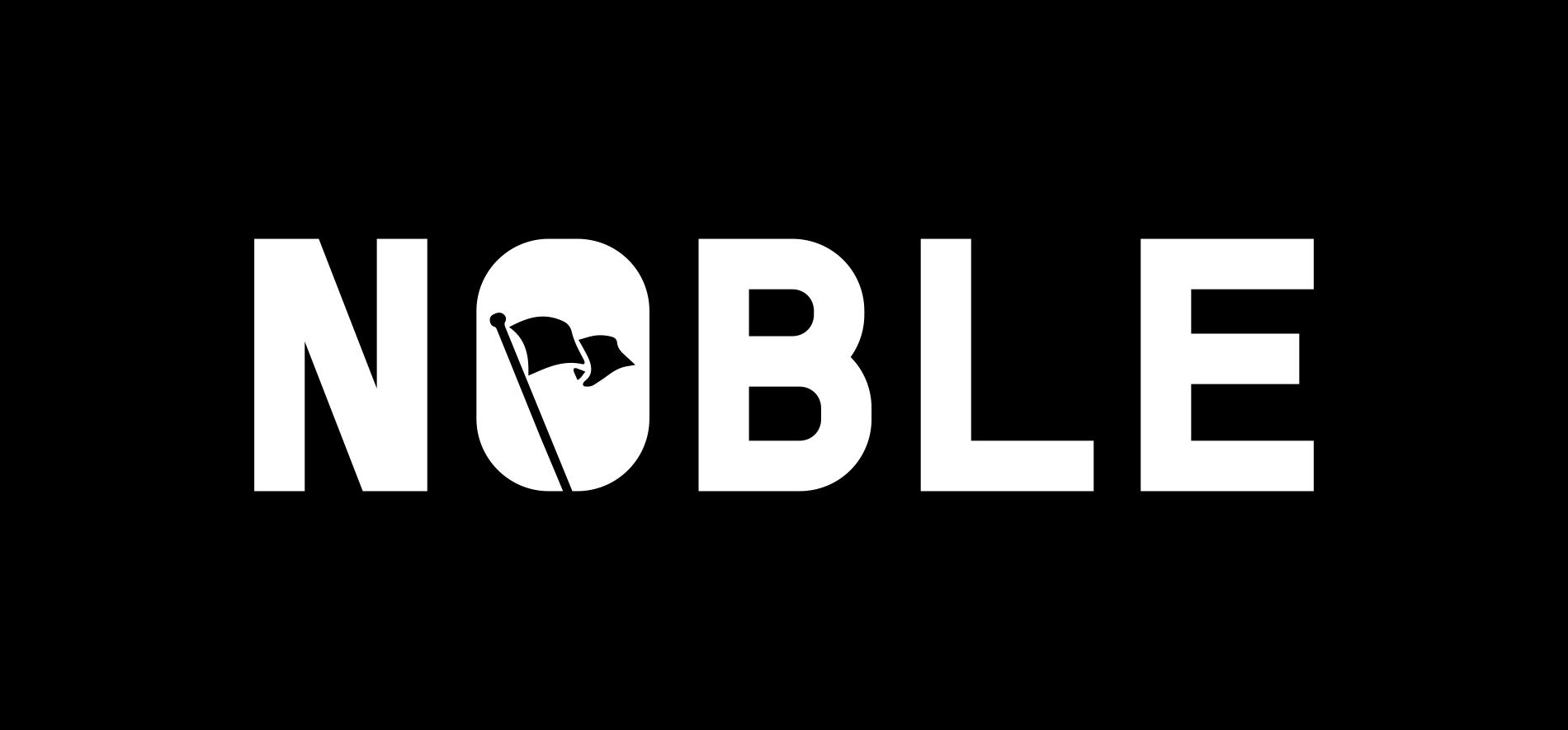
- Formerly: Duck Soup Produckions (1972–1999); Duck Soup Studios (1999–2003); Duck Studios (2003–2015)
- Industry: Advertising, animation studio, production company
- Founded: 1972
- Founder: Mark Medernach and Paul Dektor
- Headquarters: Los Angeles, California, U.S.
- Key people: Mark Medernach (president); Paul Dektor (co-founder)
- Products: Television commercials, Short films
- Website: Noble

Noble (also known as Noble600) is a production studio based in Los Angeles, California. The studio focuses primarily on producing television advertisements, mainly animated ones. It also produces music videos, short films and web content. Noble offers a wide range of services, including live action and integration, character design, film title design, 2D and 3D animation, digital compositing, digital/traditional ink & paint. The studio was co-founded by Mark Medernach and Paul Dektor.

== Filmography ==
Title	Year(s)	Notes	Client
Bingo	1991	title sequence	TriStar Pictures
Cadillacs and Dinosaurs: The Second Cataclysm	1994	video game; cel animation	Rocket Science Games
The Walt Disney World Explorer	1996	video game; animation and backgrounds	Disney Interactive
Voice B Gone	1997	short film; digital ink and paint	Dave Wasson
The New Woody Woodpecker Show	1999	main titles	Universal Cartoon Studios
All I Want for Christmas Is You (So So Def remix)	2000	music video	Mariah Carey
The Snowman	2001	short film	
The ACLU Freedom Files	2005	titles	Brave New Films
Madagascar: Escape 2 Africa	2008	end credits	DreamWorks Animation
Wild About Safety with Timon and Pumbaa	2008-2013		Disney Educational Productions
United States of Tara	2008	main titles	DreamWorks Television; Showtime Networks
Kiss a Girl	2008	music video	Keith Urban
Rubbuds	2009	short film	
Cloudy with a Chance of Meatballs	2009	title sequence and end credits	Sony Pictures Animation
The Smurfs: A Christmas Carol	2011		Sony Pictures Animation
The Smurfs: The Legend of Smurfy Hollow	2013		Sony Pictures Animation
The Little Prince	2015	special effects	Orange Studio; LPPTV; M6 Films

=== Commercials ===
- 7 Up
- 9Lives (1979–1980)
- American Greetings
- American Express
- Anheuser-Busch
- Applebee's
- Bank One Corporation
- Bell Atlantic
- Ben & Jerry's
- Black Star Beer (1992)
- Blimpie
- Blockbuster Video
- Bob's Stores
- Burger King
- CalArts
- Campbell's
- Chiquita
- The Coca-Cola Company
- Comcast
- Cox Communications
- Craig Electronics (1979)
- El Pollo Loco
- El Torito
- Energizer
- Foot Locker
- Fox Family Channel (1998)
- Game Show Network (1999)
- General Mills
- General Motors
- Giant Markets
- Griffith Observatory
- HBO (1986, 1999)
- H&R Block
- Healthtex
- H-E-B
- The Hershey Company
- Hoosier Lottery
- Idaho Potato Commission
- Indiana State Fair
- IndustryWeek
- Jack's
- JCPenney
- Juicy Juice (1997)
- Kaiser Aluminum
- Kellogg's (1970s–1998)
- Lancers
- Levi Strauss & Co.
- M&M's (2003–2004)
- Mattel
- McDonald's
- Molina Healthcare
- Nesbitt's
- Nestlé (1997–1999)
- The New York Times
- Nike
- Nissan
- Pentel of America
- PepsiCo
- Pfizer
- POM Wonderful
- Post Consumer Brands
- Public Storage
- Ralphs
- Regional Transportation Authority
- Ronald McDonald House Charities
- Roundy's
- Scottish Rite Hospital
- Starkist
- Tetley
- Toyota
- TurboTax
- United Airlines
- UnitedHealth Group
- United States Olympic Committee
- United States Postal Service
- Vlasic Pickles
- Walmart
- Walt Disney Parks and Resorts
- Wienerschnitzel
- The Wherehouse
- Winstar Communications
- Zicam

== Awards ==
- Won the 36th Annual Annie Award for Best Animated Television Commercial for United Airlines "Heart" directed by Jamie Caliri.
- Won the 34th Annual Annie Award for Best Animated Television Commercial for United Airlines "Dragon" directed by Jamie Caliri.
- Won the 2010 Rising Star Award at the Canada International Film Festival for Rubbuds, directed by Jan Chen.
- Won the 2009 Emmy for Best Main Title Design for United States of Tara
- Won the 2009 Clio Award (Silver) for Television Animation for United Airlines "Sea Orchestra" directed by The Blackheart Gang.
- Won the 2009 Best Animated short film at the Naperville Independent Film Festival for Rubbuds, directed by Jan Chen.
- Won the 2010 Best Animation at Las Vegas International Film Festival for Rubbuds, directed by Jan Chen.
- Won the 22nd Annual Annie Award (1994) for Best Animated Television Commercial for Coca-Cola "Sax Man".

== Roster of directors ==
- Dadomani
- Paul Dektor
- Hsinping Pan
- John Robertson
- Lane Nakamura and Jan Chen
- Paper Panther
- Mainframe
- Oh Yeah Wow
- Oliver Conrad
- Paloma
- Screen Novelties
- SMOG
- Tiny Inventions
