= Dino-Riders =

American animated television series

- Product logo
- Genre: Action; Adventure; Science fiction Superhero
- Created by: Gerry Conway; Carla Conway
- Developed by: Kayte Kuch; Larry Parr; Sheryl Scarborough
- Directed by: Ray Lee; Steven Hahn
- Starring: Charles Adler; Jack Angel; Cam Clarke; Townsend Coleman; Joe Colligan; Peter Cullen; Ike Eisenmann; Dan Gilvezan; Noelle North; Rob Paulsen; Patrick Pinney; Frank Welker
- Composers: Haim Saban; Shuki Levy; Udi Harpaz
- Country of origin: United States
- Original language: English
- No. of seasons: 1
- No. of episodes: 14

Production
- Executive producers: Margaret Loesch; Joe Taritero; B. James Alley
- Producers: Stephanie Graziano; Jay Garfinkel; Steven Hahn; Robert G. Lurie
- Running time: 23 minutes
- Production companies: Marvel Productions; Tyco Toys

Original release
- Network: First-run syndication
- Release: October 1 – December 31, 1988

Dino-Riders is an American animated television series that first aired in 1988. The cartoon was primarily a promotional show to launch a new Tyco toyline. Only fourteen episodes were produced, three of which were produced on VHS for the United States. The show aired in the U.S. as part of the Marvel Action Universe programming block.

The series focuses on the battle between the Valorians and Rulons on prehistoric Earth. The Valorians were a superhuman race, while the Rulons comprised several types of humanoid animals. Both races came from the future but were transported back in time to the age of dinosaurs. Once on Earth, the Valorians befriended dinosaurs, while the Rulons brainwashed them.

Ownership of the series passed to Disney in 2001 when Disney acquired Fox Kids Worldwide, which also includes Marvel Productions.

== Overview ==
The Valorians are a species of peaceful humanoids who live on the planet Valoria until it is invaded by the predatory Rulons. A group of Valorians led by Questar attempt to escape the Rulon invasion using a spaceship equipped with the "Space Time Energy Projector" (S.T.E.P.), which malfunctions and transports them to Earth during the prehistoric era. Unknown to them, the Rulon flagship, the Dreadlock is also sent back through time.

After successfully landing on prehistoric Earth, the Valorians use their AMP ("Amplified Mental Projector") necklaces to communicate with the dinosaurs they encountered and eventually befriend them. On the other hand, the Rulons—led by the warlord Krulos—use brainwashing devices known as brain-boxes to control dinosaurs for their own needs. The Rulons then launch an attack on the Valorians, who call upon their dinosaur friends to assist them in fighting back.

== Characters ==
=== Valorians ===
The Valorians are a race of superhumans from the planet Valoria who were renamed as the Dino-Riders and the main protagonists of the series.

- Questar (voiced by Dan Gilvezan) is the leader of the Valorians who is strong-willed and courageous.
- Mind-Zei (voiced by Peter Cullen) is a blind elderly warrior with a sixth sense for detecting people around him. He offers advice to Questar and is also Serena's grandfather.
- Yungstar (voiced by Joe Colligan) is a young man who is eager for action and is prone to letting pride get in his way. He rides a Deinonychus and flies a Quetzalcoatlus in later episodes.
- Serena (voiced by Noelle North) is able to heal other beings and can sense when someone is in trouble. She is also the granddaughter of Mind-Zei.
- Turret (voiced by Charlie Adler) is a technician and scientist. Turret is in charge of the S.T.E.P. crystal.
- Llahd (voiced by Stephen Dorff) is the youngest of the Dino-Riders.
- Gunnur (voiced by Peter Cullen) is a hardened war veteran and high-ranking official who trains the other Dino-Riders.
- Tagg (voiced by Wally Burr) is a mid-level official who also helps instructs in the training of the Dino-Riders. He rides a Pachycephalosaurus.
- Ikon (voiced by Cam Clarke) is a statistician as well as a pragmatist. Ikon is one of Questar's top advisors. He possesses a staff that allows him to answer Questar's questions almost instantly.
- Vector (voiced by Dan Gilvezan) is one of Questar's top advisors. He is a general contractor who has a computerized wrist strap that allows him to assess projects.
- Aero (voiced by Cam Clarke) is a competitive rival of Yungstar. He flies a Quetzalcoatlus and can maneuver it better than anyone.
- Tark (voiced by Cam Clarke) is a high-ranking Dino-Rider official. Questar would often consult with Tark on a number of important matters, his years of experience, and his vast amount of knowledge has earned him respect from his peers.
- Ayce usually teaches training and equipment familiarization classes.
- Aries is a young warrior who is frequently unsure of himself and is always seeking guidance from the other Valorians. He mainly mans the artillery of the Diplodocus.
- Neutrino assists in various training courses. Although much of Neutrino's time is spent training others, Neutrino is more than capable on the battlefield.

==== Commandos ====
The Commandos are a special forces military unit within the Dino-Riders.

- Astra (voiced by Townsend Coleman) is a hardened war veteran and leader of the Commandos. He was formerly a teacher at the Valorian University and once counted Questar as a student.
- Bomba (voiced by Peter Cullen) is an explosives expert who is utilized to make clearings or remove obstacles.
- Kameelian (voiced by Rob Paulsen) specializes in surveillance and reconnaissance, and is a master of disguise.
- Glyde (voiced by Frank Welker) is an aerial reconnaissance and artillery cover who uses a glider to navigate through the air.
- Faze (voiced by Rob Paulsen) is an artillery expert.
- Rok is an expert in crossing rocky terrain such as mountains.

==== Cro-Magnons ====
The Valorians have also made allies with a tribe of Cro-Magnons after the Commandos were accidentally sent into the Ice Age. Among the known Cro-Magnons are:

- Zar (voiced by Townsend Coleman) is the leader of a clan of Cro-Magnons. He leads his clan against the evil Neanderthals of Grom and refuses to succumb to his powers like the other tribes before him.
- Kub (voiced by Ike Eisenmann) is a young but courageous Cro-Magnon who lost his father during an earlier attack by Grom. He helps the Valorians in their fight with the Rulons ever since going with them to the past to reunite with the Dino-Riders.
- Maya (voiced by Liz Georges) is a compassionate Cro-Magnon and healer.

=== Rulons ===
The Rulons are a race of aliens who are the enemies of the Valorians and the main antagonists of the series.

- Krulos (voiced by Frank Welker) is the frog-like leader of the Rulons. He mostly uses a Tyrannosaurus when going into battle.
- Rasp (voiced by Frank Welker) is a snake-like creature who is the leader of the Viper group and Krulos' second-in-command. Rasp always tries to usurp Krulos's place while keeping Hammerhead and Antor from trying to take his status.
- Hammerhead (voiced by Charlie Adler) is a shark-like creature who is the leader of the Sharkmen and one of Krulos' top generals. Hammerhead usually vies with Rasp and Antor for second-in-command status.
- Antor (voiced by Peter Cullen) is an ant-like creature who is the leader of the Antmen and one of Krulos' generals. Antor usually vies with Hammerhead and Rasp for second-in-command status.
- Krok (voiced by Cam Clarke) is a crocodile-like creature and one of Krulos' generals. He is entirely obedient to Krulos and focuses on serving his master rather than getting involved in the petty squabbling in which his fellow generals engage.
- Skate (voiced by Frank Welker) is a manta ray-like creature who is a low-ranking official of the Rulons.
- Lokus (voiced by Charlie Adler) is a locust-like creature who is a low-ranking official of the Rulons.
- Algar: A crocodile-like creature.
- Buzz: A locust-like creature.
- Dedeye: A Sharkman.
- Demon: An Antman.
- Drone: An Antman.
- Fang: A member of the Viper Group.
- Finn: A Sharkman.
- Fire: An Antman.
- Gill: A Sharkman.
- Gorr: A crocodile-like creature.
- Gutz: A crocodile-like creature.
- Kraw: A crocodile-like creature.
- Mako: A Sharkman.
- Pox: A locust-like creature.
- Rattlar: A member of the Viper Group.
- Rayy: A manta ray-like creature.
- Sidewinder: A member of the Viper Group.
- Six-Gill: A Sharkman.
- Skwirm: A member of the Viper Group.
- Sludj: A manta ray-like creature.
- Snarrl: A crocodile-like creature.
- Squish: A locust-like creature.
- Sting: An Antman.
- Termite: An Antman.

=== Neanderthals ===
Zar's tribe of Cro-Magnons have been at war with a rogue tribe of Neanderthals and eventually threatens the Commandos after they were sent to the Ice Age by accident. Among the known Neanderthals are:

- Grom (voiced by Jack Angel) is the leader of a deadly clan of Neanderthals who seeks to control or annihilate all neighboring tribes. He has ruled his tribe for years and has struck fear into the hearts of many rival Neanderthal tribes. Following the fight against the Dino-Riders, Grom was accidentally pulled back to the Dino-Riders' time and runs off to join the Rulons. He is the Neanderthal equivalent of Krulos.

== Cast ==
- Charles Adler – Turret, Hammerhead, Lokus
- Jack Angel – Grom (in "Ice Age Adventure")
- S. Scott Bullock
- Wally Burr – Narrator, Tagg
- Cam Clarke – Aero, Ikonn, Krok
- Townsend Coleman – Astra (in "Ice Age Adventure"), Zar (in "Ice Age Adventure")
- Joe Colligan – Yungstar
- Peter Cullen – Gunnur, Antor, Mind-Zei, Bomba (in "Ice Age Adventure")
- Shawn Donahue
- Stephen Dorff – Llahd
- Ike Eisenmann – Kub (in "Ice Age Adventure")
- Liz Georges – Maya (in "Ice Age Adventure")
- Dan Gilvezan – Questar, Vector
- Noelle North – Serena
- Rob Paulsen – Faze, Kameelian
- Patrick Pinney
- Frank Welker – Krulos, Rasp, Glyde

== Crew ==
- Wally Burr – voice director
- Stephen Hahn – director (eps 1, 14)
- Ray Lee – supervising director (eps 2–13)
- Kayte Kuch, Larry Parr, Sheryl Scarborough – story editors

== Episodes ==
The Dino-Riders series consisted of a single season of 14 episodes. The first two episodes were produced for release on VHS as standalone specials, the first in 1987 and the second in 1988. Also in 1988, the series transitioned to television, with a further 11 episodes being produced and added to the specials to create a standard season's worth of 13 episodes. Lastly, in 1990, an additional VHS special was produced to promote the new range of "Ice Age" figures, released as "Ice Age Adventure", but with the on-screen title "Dino-Riders in the Ice Age". Below is a list of each episode along with the date it first aired.

Episode #	Title	Written by	Aired	Synopsis
1	"The Adventure Begins"	Gerry Conway and Carla Conway	1987 (VHS release); October 1, 1988 (airdate)	While trying to escape from the Rulons, the Valorians end up on prehistoric Earth and settle down with the various dinosaurs. The Rulons, however, have been taken to Earth as well and are determined to return to their own time at any cost.
2	"Revenge of the Rulons"	Michael Walker	October 8, 1988	Llahd is taken prisoner by the Rulons, who are also planning to steal the S.T.E.P.
3	"The Rulon Stampede"	Larry Parr	October 15, 1988	Krulos plans to steal the S.T.E.P. crystal by sending a dinosaur stampede through the Dino-Riders' camp.
4	"The Blue Skies of Earth"	Kayte Kuch and Sheryl Scarborough	October 22, 1988	The Dino-Riders practice their flying skills while Hammerhead and Rasp fight for Krulos' favor.
5	"Toro, Toro, Torosaurus"	Paul Kirshner (story), Kayte Kuch, Sheryl Scarborough, and Donald F. Glut (teleplay)	October 29, 1988	When Llhad runs off, the Dino-Riders split up to look for him, giving Krulos an opportunity to attack.
6	"T-Rex"	Christy Marx	November 5, 1988	Turret feels that he is of no use to his fellow Dino-Riders, while some Valorians miss the existence of mirrors. Meanwhile, Krulos steals a baby Tyrannosaurus to get its parents to attack the Dino-Riders' camp.
7	"Krulos"	Kayte Kuch and Sheryl Scarborough	November 12, 1988	Krulos' exo-suit is damaged by an earthquake and his subordinates plan to steal his position.
8	"Tagg, You're It!"	Donald F. Glut	November 19, 1988	Tagg discovers that the Rulons are digging their way underground to the Dino-Riders' camp but is captured.
9	"Thanksgiving"	Alan Swayze	November 26, 1988	The Dino-Riders' Thanksgiving celebration threatens to be ruined by the Rulons damming up the river.
10	"To Lose the Path"	Alan Swayze	December 3, 1988	Yungstar's anger at the Rulons may remove his ability to communicate with dinosaurs.
11	"Enter the Commandos"	Christy Marx	December 10, 1988	The Commandos break into the Dreadlock to rescue stolen Triceratops eggs.
12	"Battle for the Brontosaurus" (1)	Paul Kirshner (story), Kayte Kuch and Sheryl Scarborough (teleplay)	December 17, 1988	The Dino-Riders rescue a Brontosaurus from the Rulons and Krulos leads an attack to get it back, but that is not all the Rulon Emperor has up his sleeve.
13	"One to Lead Us" (2)	Paul Kirshner (story), Kayte Kuch and Sheryl Scarborough (teleplay)	December 24, 1988	Having successfully framed Questar as a traitor, Krulos takes the Brontosaurus and the S.T.E.P. crystal. Questar, the Commandos and several others must stop him before the Rulons wipe out the Dino-Riders for good.
14	"Ice Age Adventure"/"Dino-Riders in the Ice Age"	Paul Kirshner	1990 (VHS release)	After the S.T.E.P. is repaired, the Dino-Riders work to keep it from being claimed by the Rulons, but an accident sends Astra, Kameelian, Bomba, Faze, and Glyde to the Ice Age, where they encounter a tribe of Cro-Magnons led by Zar and befriend the animals. As the Commandos work to repair the S.T.E.P. and reunite with the Dino-Riders, they must help Zar's tribe in their fight against a Neanderthal tribe led by Grom.

== Development ==
The concept was created by Tyco's marketing vice president Jim Allie who wanted to create a toyline that would combine dinosaurs and action figures. According to Warren Bosch, he came up with the idea that aliens visited Earth in the ancient past and combined their technology with the dinosaurs' natural abilities.

Development for the story was given to comic book writer Gerry Conway and his wife Carla. The latter stated:

I remember we were also influenced a little by what was being done in the Japanese toy market with their extremely expensive toys that were very complex. Time travel, lasers, and aliens were second nature to us and anyone who had read Isaac Asimov's Foundation trilogy or seen Star Wars. I think the show benefitted from our involvement and perhaps we helped to strengthen its 'longevity' legs so it could handle time and be here today.

== Toys ==
In total, there were four series of Dino-Riders toys: Series 1 (1988), Series 2 (1989), Series 3 and Ice Age (1990). The Ice Age line focused on ice age mammals rather than dinosaurs.

The larger toys in the range also had a motorized walking action with the dinosaur's head swaying from side to side. Each Rulon faction toy came with a different self-automated trap.

The dinosaurs were acclaimed for their detailed bodies and color, and impressed the Smithsonian Institution, who contacted Tyco to reproduce the dinosaurs for their "Dinosaur and other Prehistoric Reptile Collection". Dinosaur illustrator William Stout was credited for dinosaur design on the show's credits, while paleontologist Robert T. Bakker was hired as a consultant.

=== Series 1 (1988) ===
The release of the first series of Dino-Riders toys was timed to coincide with the series. It initially consisted of 5 Valorian and 6 Rulon toys, along with eight two-figure packs. A sixth Valorian toy, Torosaurus, would be released at the end of the series. The Diplodocus, Torosaurus, Tyrannosaurus rex, and Triceratops all had motorized walking mechanisms.

Valorians	Rulons
Diplodocus with Questar, Mind-Zei, and Aries	Tyrannosaurus rex with Krulos, Bitor, and Cobrus
Torosaurus with Gunnur and Magnus	Triceratops with Hammerhead and Sidewinder
Deinonychus with Sky	Deinonychus with Antor
Styracosaurus with Turret	Monoclonius with Mako
Quetzalcoatlus with Yungstar	Pteranodon with Rasp
Pterodactyl with Llahd	Ankylosaurus with Sting

Action figures

- Questar / Krulos
- Proto / Rattlar
- Orion / Six-Gill
- Mind-Zei / Fire
- Quark / Finn
- Nova / Demon
- Mercury / Fang
- Boldar / Termite

=== Series 2 (1989) ===
The second series of Dino-Rider toys consisted of 7 new Valorian toys and 3 new Rulons, along with eight more two-figure packs as well as 6 "Commandos". The Commandos consisted of a human figure with unique weapons and accessories.

The most notable toy from this series was the Brontosaurus, which was the largest toy in the range, measuring 34 inches (86 cm) long and 15 inches (38 cm) tall. In an effort to keep costs down, Tyco had to abandon several features that were originally intended to be part of the figure. These included motorized walking action, four figures instead of three, and an entirely different weapons system.

The Stegosaurus toy had motorized walking action, while the Pachycephalosaurus and Saurolophus both had a mechanism that allowed their bodies to thrust from a horizontal position with their tail in the air into a vertical position with their tail on the ground.

Valorians	Rulons	Commandos
Brontosaurus with Serena, Ayce, and Ion (also included three Rhamphorhynchus)	Kentrosaurus with Krok	Astra
Stegosaurus with Tark and Vega	Saurolophus with Lokus	Bomba
Edmontonia with Axis	Placerias with Skate	Kameelian
Dimetrodon with Shado		Glyde
Pachycephalosaurus with Tagg		Faze
Struthiomimus with Nimbus		Rok
Protoceratops with Kanon		

Action figures

- Questar / Krulos
- Serena / Skwirm
- Yungstar / Dedeye
- Mind-Zei / Sludj
- Hondo / Drone
- Ursus / Snarrl
- Neutrino / Poxx
- Graff / Kraw

=== Series 3 (1990) ===
The third series of Dino-Riders toys was split into two assortments: three new dinosaurs for the regular series and four prehistoric mammals for the new "Ice Age" concept. The dinosaur sets are among the rarest of the toys due to a limited production run.

The Quetzalcoatlus, originally released as a Valorian in Series 1, was re-released as a Rulon with a yellow and black color scheme.

Valorians	Rulons
Pachyrhinosaurus with Atlas	Quetzalcoatlus with Algar
Chasmosaurus with Llava	

==== Ice Age ====
The Ice Age subline was unique in that all of the animals produced belonged to the Valorian faction and, with the rest of the Series 3, are very hard to find. This line also included six more two-figure packs. The woolly mammoth, the largest figure in the range, had motorized walking action.

Valorians
Woolly mammoth with Grom
Ground sloth with Ulk
Archaeotherium with Zar
Smilodon with Kub

Action figures

- Onk / Buzz
- Tor / Gorr
- Urg / Rayy
- Agga / Gill
- Ecco / Squish
- Wizz / Gutz

=== Rulon Warriors Battle Pack (2020) ===
In 2020, Mattel released an Entertainment Earth exclusive battle pack, called the Rulon Warriors Battle Pack, modeled after Army Men. The kit, designed for children aged 6 and up, is described as:

"It's the heroic Valorians versus the evil Rulon Alliance in this exciting Dino-Riders Rulon Warriors Battle Pack—Entertainment Earth Exclusive. Recreate epic battle sequences inspired by the 1980s toy line and Dino-Riders animated series or create your own new adventures! This special edition collection contains 6 dinosaurs and 15 other figures, including such classic characters as Rulon leader Krulos, Bitor, Boldar, and Dino-Riders hotshot Llahd. Whether you're discovering Dino-Riders for the first time or you've been a fan since you were a kid, you do not want to miss this sensational opportunity to Harness the Power of Dinosaurs! Each figure measure approximately 1 inch tall and the dinos measure approximately up to 7 inches long" (Entertainment Earth)

== Comics ==
Apart from the miniature comics included with each of the dinosaur toys, Marvel Comics released a three-part miniseries of Dino-Riders comics. The comics' storylines were considered to be much darker than the cartoon, sometimes focusing on conflicts between the Valorians. For instance, one storyline involves Questar being accused of murdering his brother Tark, who was captured by the Rulons and made into a human/dinosaur hybrid in the storyline following Questar's trial.

The first comic book issue, "The Path", was released in February 1989 and was 23 pages long. A Dino-Riders Annual was later released as a hardcover book that contained both the first and second issues in one collection.

== Film adaptation ==
In 2015, Tracking Board reported that Mattel was working with Solipsist Film to develop a live-action Dino-Riders film with Alissa Phillips and Stephen L'Heureux producing. As of 2026, there is no indication that the film is going forward.

== In other media ==
- In addition to the toys and comics, there were a number of other products released during the Dino-Riders run on television. These were primarily child-oriented products such as colouring books, puzzles, and crayons, but also included clothing, kites, stickers, and costumes. Tyco also released a number of Super Dough play sets.
- Some of the dinosaur shots in the French B movie Dinosaur from the Deep were made with a Dino-Riders Tyrannosaurus toy.
- Rex from the Toy Story franchise is based on the Dino-Riders Tyrannosaurus toy. In the first film, when the toys all meet Buzz Lightyear and talk about where they came from, Rex states that he is from a smaller company that Mattel purchased, referencing Mattel's acquisition of Tyco.
- The March 12, 1992 episode of Saturday Night Live had a prerecorded spoof of the Dino-Riders toy line commercial as Action Cats, an action figure accessory for cats.
- A Rulon makes a cameo appearance in the South Park episode "Imaginationland Episode III".
- The Dino-Riders appear in the Robot Chicken episode "G.I. Jogurt", with Astra and Bomba both voiced by Seth Green.

== See also ==
- Planet of Dinosaurs
- Terra Nova
- Dinosaucers
- Extreme Dinosaurs
- ParaWorld
- Ark: Survival Evolved
- Ark: Survival Ascended
- Imaginext Dinosaurs
