= Nine Culliford =

Belgian colorist (1930–2016)

- Born: Janine Devroye; 29 March 1930
- Died: 5 July 2016 (aged 86); Uccle, Belgium
- Other name: Janine Culliford
- Occupation: Colourist
- Spouse: Peyo (m. 1952; died 1992)
- Children: 2

Janine Culliford (née Devroye; 29 March 1930 – 5 July 2016) was a Belgian colourist of comic strips.

Nine Culliford was the wife of the comic strip creator known as Peyo (the pseudonym of Pierre Culliford, 1928–1992). She coloured his illustrations up until his death.

== Biography ==
She is especially notable for coming up with the idea that the Smurfs should be coloured blue. After the death of her husband, she continued to colour the comic strips produced by the studio founded by her son Thierry who has been continuing the work of Peyo.

She died on 5 July 2016 at the age of 86.

The 2017 film Smurfs: The Lost Village is dedicated to her memory.
