= Louis Russek =

Louis Russek (July 3, 1895 - April 25, 1985) was an American businessman, and the founder and chairman of Healthtex, a leading manufacturer of children's clothing.

Russek was born on July 3, 1895, at East 28th Street in Manhattan, New York.

In 1921, he founded the Standard Romper Company, which went public in 1971 and became Healthtex, before being taken over by Chesebrough-Pond's in 1973.

Russek married Rose Bauman (died 1967), and they had two daughters, Isabelle Leeds of Manhattan and Norma Grabler of Palm Beach, Florida.

Russek died on April 25, 1985, at his Manhattan home, aged 89.
