= Gary Basaraba =

Canadian actor (born 1959)

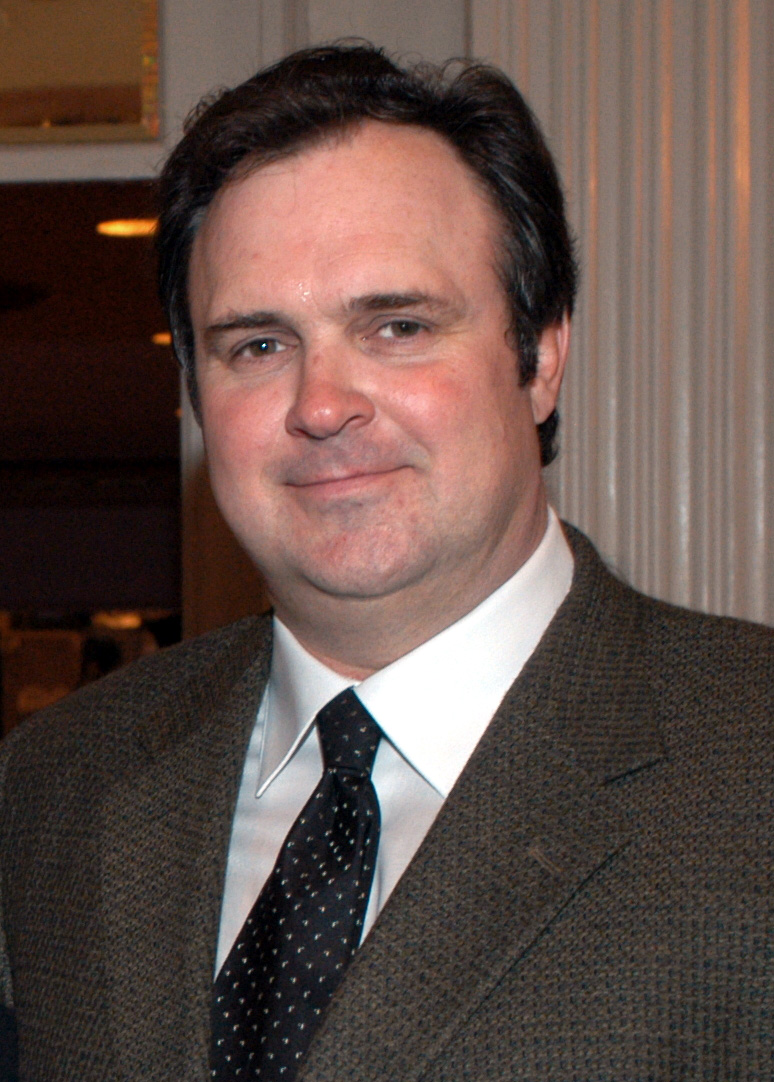
- Basaraba in 2003
- Born: March 16, 1959 (age 67); Edmonton, Alberta, Canada
- Education: Yale Drama School
- Occupation: Actor
- Years active: 1985–present

Gary Basaraba (born March 16, 1959) is a Canadian actor. He appeared as Sergeant Richard Santoro on Steven Bochco's Brooklyn South and Officer Ray Hechler on the series Boomtown. He has appeared in Martin Scorsese films, first in The Last Temptation of Christ (1988) and then The Irishman (2019) and Killers of the Flower Moon (2023).

== Career ==
In 1985 he portrayed the father, Jack Grainger, in the film One Magic Christmas with Mary Steenburgen. In 1987, he appeared in the episodes "Duty and Honor" (3x15) and "Honor Among Thieves" (4x16) of the TV series Miami Vice.

Basaraba played American journalist Heywood Broun in Mrs. Parker and the Vicious Circle in 1994, and in 1996 appeared as Alberto in Striptease. He played Sheriff Grady Kilgore in Fried Green Tomatoes. He also played Saint Andrew in The Last Temptation of Christ, and had a role in Sweet Dreams.

In 2001 he had the lead role in Recipe for Murder.

Basaraba played Homer Zuckerman in the 2006 remake of Charlotte's Web. Since 2007, he has appeared in the Canadian television series Mixed Blessings.

Basaraba has also made four appearances in the Law & Order franchise, as a bartender in the original series episode titled "Point of View", as a corrections officer in the Law & Order episode "The Brotherhood" in 2004, as well as in the SVU episodes entitled "Parasites", as the husband of a woman who has gone missing, and "Caretaker" as a defense attorney.

In 2010, he played the role of Jimmy Burke in "After Hours", the tenth episode of the first season of the CBS police procedural drama Blue Bloods.

Basaraba also played the role of Herb Rennet in the television series Mad Men. He was also the voice of Hefty Smurf in the live-action/CG family film The Smurfs. In 2015, he played the role of Neil on an episode of The Leftovers. In 2016, he played the role of Don in The Accountant.

In the Martin Scorsese 2019 epic crime film The Irishman, Basaraba played Frank "Fitz" Fitzsimmons, who was the acting president of the International Brotherhood of Teamsters from 1967 to 1971, and president from 1971 to 1981. In 2023, he appeared in Scorsese's Killers of the Flower Moon.

== Filmography ==
=== Film ===
Year	Title	Role	Notes
1985	Alamo Bay	Leon	
1985	Sweet Dreams	Woodhouse	
1985	One Magic Christmas	Jack Grainger	
1986	No Mercy	Joe Collins	
1987	Who's That Girl	Shipping Clerk	
1988	The Last Temptation of Christ	Andrew	
1989	Little Sweetheart	Barkeeper	
1991	The Dark Wind	Larry	
1991	Fried Green Tomatoes	Grady Kilgore	
1994	Mrs. Parker and the Vicious Circle	Heywood Broun	
1994	The War	Dodge	
1996	Striptease	Alberto	
1997	Lifebreath	John	
2002	K-9: P.I.	Pete Timmons	
2002	Unfaithful	Det. Mirojnick	
2006	Charlotte's Web	Homer Zuckerman	
2009	The Taking of Pelham 123	Jerry Pollard	
2011	The Smurfs	Hefty (voice)	
2011	The Smurfs: A Christmas Carol	Hefty (voice)	
2013	The Smurfs: The Legend of Smurfy Hollow	Hefty (voice)	
2013	The Smurfs 2	Hefty (voice)	
2016	The Accountant	Don	
2017	Suburbicon	Mitch	
2018	American Animals	Warren Lipka Senior	
2018	Little Italy	Vince Campo	
2019	The Irishman	Frank Fitzsimmons	
2023	Sound of Freedom	Earl Backman	
2023	Killers of the Flower Moon	William J. Burns	

=== Television ===
Year	Title	Role	Notes
1987, 1988	Miami Vice	Cyrus / Dr. Morris	2 episodes
1991	In the Line of Duty: Manhunt in the Dakotas	Leland Winters	Television film
1992	Afterburn	Bill Decker	Television film
1992, 2004	Law & Order	Kevin Reill / Officer John Patrick Worley	2 episodes
1993	For Their Own Good	Roy Wheeler	Television film
1994	Northern Exposure	Willie	Episode: "Up River"
1994, 2000	NYPD Blue	Various roles	3 episodes
1995	New York Undercover	Tirelli	Episode: "Eliminate the Middleman"
1995	A Horse for Danny	Solly	Television film
1995	The Wright Verdicts	Arthur Broat	Episode: "Family Matters"
1995	Homicide: Life on the Street	Paul Garbarek	Episode: "A Doll's Eyes"
1996	Swift Justice	Davis Malcolm	Episode: "Isaiah's Daughter"
1996	The Writing on the Wall	Leafman	Television film
1997	Dead Silence	Shephard Wilcox	Television film
1997	What Happened to Bobby Earl?	Jack Dietrick	Television film
1997	The Outer Limits	Ben Miller	Episode: "Heart's Desire"
1997	Falls Road	Charlie Kilmer	Television film
1997–1998	Brooklyn South	Richard Santoro	22 episodes
1998	Martial Law	Tom McNiece	Episode: "Cop Out"
1999	Holy Joe	Ernie Blevins	Television film
1999	Early Edition	Sam Cooper	Episode: "The Out-of-Towner"
1999	Family Law	Maury French	Episode: "Holt vs. Holt"
1999	Partners	John Boone	Episode: "Pilot"
2000	Cold Shoulder	Rooney	Television film
2001	The Sports Pages	Frank	Television film
2001	Mysterious Ways	Joe Stanislaw	Episode: "Doctor in the House"
2001, 2002	Judging Amy	Brian Whitaker	3 episodes
2001, 2018	Law & Order: Special Victims Unit	Various roles	2 episodes
2002	Guilty Hearts	Matt Moran	Television film
2002	Third Watch	Joe	Episode: "Unleashed"
2002	Recipe for Murder	Murray Maguire	Television film
2002–2003	Boomtown	Officer Ray Hechler	24 episodes
2004	Everwood	Mr. Curtis	Episode: "Controlling Interest"
2005	Close to Home	Randy Stevens	Episode: "Double Life Wife"
2005	Everybody Hates Chris	Art Wuliger	2 episodes
2006	CSI: Crime Scene Investigation	Mr. Sullivan	Episode: "Killer"
2006	Jesse Stone: Death in Paradise	Norman Shaw	Television film
2007	Las Vegas	Ned Oshinski	Episode: "Barechested in the Park"
2007	Nip/Tuck	Arthur	Episode: "Dr. Joshua Lee"
2007–2010	Mixed Blessings	Hank	25 episodes
2008	Recount	Clay Roberts	Television film
2008	Danny Fricke	Whitaker	Television film
2009	Numbers	Joe Thibodeaux	Episode: "Arrow of Time"
2009	Cold Case	Vinnie Buonaforte / Brown	Episode: "Witness Protection"
2010	Blue Bloods	Jimmy Burke	Episode: "After Hours"
2011	Flashpoint	Sgt. Oliver MacCoy	Episode: "No Promise"
2011	Criminal Minds: Suspect Behavior	William Meeks	Episode: "Here Is the Fire"
2011	Castle	Ralph Carbone	Episode: "Slice of Death"
2011	Unforgettable	Lt. Willard	Episode: "With Honor"
2012	Hornet's Nest	Seth	Television film
2012	The Mentalist	Stephen Hannigan	Episode: "Red Dawn"
2012, 2013	Mad Men	Herb Rennet	3 episodes
2013	Person of Interest	Stu Sommers	Episode: "Nothing to Hide"
2014	Justified	Kemp	Episode: "Raw Deal"
2014	Bones	Bob Gordon	Episode: "The Purging of the Pundit"
2014	Forever	Norman Sontag	Episode: "The Man in the Killer Suit"
2015	The Leftovers	Neil	Episode: "International Assassin"
2016	Madam Secretary	Tom Ryan	Episode: "Invasive Species"
2016	NCIS: New Orleans	Dr. Steven Bellamy	Episode: "Second Line"
2016	Grey's Anatomy	Micah	Episode: "You Haven't Done Nothin'"
2017	Chicago Justice	William O'Boyle	2 episodes
2018	Criminal Minds	James Odenkirk	Episode: "Last Gasp"
2019	Doom Patrol	Big D	Episode: "Frances Patrol"
2022	Women of the Movement	Clarence Strider	5 episodes
2023	Paul T. Goldman	Royce Auditioner	Episode: "Royce"
