= Smurfette =

Female character from the Smurfs

- Comics version of Smurfette

Publication information
- Publisher: Dupuis
- First appearance: Spirou magazine, 1966
- Created by: Peyo
- Voiced by: Lucille Bliss (1981–1989); Katy Perry (live-action films; 2011–2013); Melissa Sturm (short films; 2011–2013); Demi Lovato (2017); Bérangère McNeese (2021–present); Rihanna (2025)

In-story information
- Species: Smurf; Clay (originally)
- Team affiliations: Smurfs; Gargamel (formerly)
- Notable aliases: The Lone Smurf

Smurfette (French: La Schtroumpfette) is one of the main protagonists from the comic strip The Smurfs. Smurfette was created by the evil wizard Gargamel, the Smurfs' archenemy, in order to spy on them and sow jealousy. However, she decides that she wants to be a real Smurf and Papa Smurf casts a spell that changes her hair from black to blonde as a sign of her transformation. She was the only female Smurf until the creation of Sassette. A Granny Smurf was also later introduced, although it is unclear how she was created. Thierry Culliford, the son of the comics' creator, Peyo, and current head of the Studio Peyo, announced in 2008 that more female Smurfs would be introduced in the stories. Smurfette has feminine features, with long blonde wavy hair, long eyelashes, and wears a white dress and white high heels. She is the love interest of almost every Smurf.

== Design ==
In 1966, a female Smurf was to be introduced in the story "The Smurfette", which included two versions of the type. However, to achieve her look, Peyo struggled through a real crisis. He had a complete lack of inspiration for the beautiful version of the Smurfette. He was completely stuck, because he had promised a women's magazine a preview sketch of the Smurfette before she would appear in Spirou magazine but he had nothing to send them. The debut was postponed a few times. In the meantime, Peyo had drawn a creature on paper with lush blonde hair, with mascara on her eyelids, and is constantly wearing high heeled shoes. She was loosely based on French actress Mylène Demongeot. But he was not convinced, despite the enthusiasm of his employees.

After designing several other sketches, comics artist and friend Andre Franquin convinced him to stick with the first version. Although Peyo was still not completely satisfied with the result, the type would turn out to be a success.

== Original introduction ==
The adventure of Smurfette first started in Spirou magazine in 1966. She was made by Gargamel the evil wizard as a means to create unrest in the Smurf village. When this was discovered, Papa Smurf succeeded in turning her into a real Smurf, altering her appearance at the same time.

Smurfette as she originally appeared (left) and after Papa Smurf turned her into a real Smurf (right)

She still was a source of problems between the Smurfs, though, and at the end of this story, she left the Smurf village, thus restoring the status quo of the community. She made the occasional on-off appearance, but when the animated TV series of the Smurfs was introduced in the 1980s, she was featured as a permanent character, appearing in stories in which she was not included in the original source comics. Subsequently, the comics also started to feature her as a permanent character.

== Creation and conception ==
Hal Erickson said in Television Cartoon Shows: An Illustrated Encyclopedia 1949-1993 that the reintroduction of Smurfette as a permanent character in the animated series was "bowing to merchandising dictates" in order to "appeal to little girl toy consumers." Jeffery P. Dennis, author of the journal article "The Same Thing We Do Every Night: Signifying Same-Sex Desire in Television Cartoons," said that the inclusion of Smurfette in the cartoon version of The Smurfs was likely to serve as an object of heterosexual desire for the other Smurfs and to end speculation arguing that the Smurfs were gay. In a response to Dennis's statements, Martin Goodman of Animation World Network, said that Dennis had not taken into account Erickson's comments about merchandising. Goodman further argued that capturing the young female audience would increase ratings, so the networks were more likely trying to pander to young girls than trying to defuse gay rumors. To back this up is the fact that Smurfette was the most frequently merchandised of the Smurfs.

== Fictional biography ==
=== Comics ===
Smurfette is magically created from clay by the Smurfs' enemy, Gargamel, so that she would use her charms to cause jealousy and competition among the Smurfs. He leaves her in the forest and Hefty Smurf takes her to the Smurf village, where she is given her own house.

Smurfette tries to woo the Smurfs, but they are unresponsive to her attempts as she is rather plain. Papa Smurf takes pity on her and takes her to his laboratory, where they lock themselves in while he performed "plastic smurfery" on her in which her hair is made long and blonde, her eyelashes are lengthened, and her nose is shortened. Every Smurf of the village (even Grouchy Smurf) falls in love with her new look, but Smurfette is still unsure as to whether she is a "real" Smurf. Papa Smurf advises her that she will know what to do when the situation calls for it and she will prove herself.

Unknowingly, Papa Smurf's actions caused Gargamel's plan to work after all, since the Smurfs were constantly competing for Smurfette's attention and the village was in chaos. Finally, the breaking point was reached when she caused the smitten Poet Smurf to open the sluice hatch of the village's reservoir dam, which promptly jammed and thus caused the village to be flooded. From an off-hand comment by Smurfette, the Smurfs then realized that she was Gargamel's creation, and put her on trial for her unwitting allegiance. Although acquitted, Smurfette realized the trouble her continued presence was causing and decided to leave the Smurf village. The Smurfs are sad at this, but Papa cheered them up by getting their revenge on Gargamel by using the same process that he had used to create Smurfette, but in this case they built a human-sized, wart-covered, ugly old hag who spoke in Smurf language and chased the horrified sorcerer all over the forest.

Smurfette returned occasionally to the village, though she found that her presence still aroused conflict. When the Smurfs argued about which one should marry her, she herself announced that she would take Grouchy Smurf, who had customarily stated "I hate marriage", thus making her point that the subject was closed. The Smurfs then moderated their passion for her, worshipping from a distance, and she settled permanently in the village. She even learned to speak in Smurf language when previously she had spoken in straight human speech in accordance with Gargamel's magic.

When Hefty Smurf tried to organize the Olympic Smurfs, the other Smurfs showed no interest. But when it was later announced that the winner would get a kiss from Smurfette, this produced a mad rush for the signing-in office.

=== Cartoon series ===
The Hanna-Barbera cartoon series of the Smurfs, introduced in 1981, had her as an actual Gargamel spy and saboteur who intentionally tries to disrupt life in the village. She was magically created from blue clay, "sugar and spice but nothing nice, crocodile tears, half a pack of lies, a chatter of a magpie, and the hardest stone for her heart". She is found in the forest by Hefty Smurf (The Smurfs, season 1 episode 21, "The Smurfette").

Working for Gargamel, Smurfette makes several failed attempts to defeat the Smurfs. In the dam incident, she used a slice of cake to lure Greedy Smurf into opening it. When Greedy tried to close the dam again, Smurfette yanked it back. Greedy soon caught on, all the tugging eventually threw Smurfette off balance and she promptly fell into the river. While Greedy hammered the dam back down, Papa Smurf rescued Smurfette and sent her to Smurf court.

With the entire village angrily aware of her treachery, Smurfette finally admitted her slavery to Gargamel and tearfully offered to submit to the Smurfs' judgement. The Smurfs' kindness to Smurfette caused her to want nothing else than to be a real Smurf, so Papa Smurf absolved her of her guilt and offered to try to free her by making her a real Smurf. Papa Smurf magically undid some of Gargamel's spells and consequently turned Smurfette into a more beautiful creature. Her hair grew and became blonde. Her dress became frillier. As a final touch, her shoes turned into high-heel pumps. Of course, everyone now loved her and actually fought to do trivial favors for her such as walking her home.

When Gargamel made contact with her again, he was alarmed by the changes in her visage and realized that Papa Smurf had undone his control of her. He managed to placate her and manipulated her into luring the Smurfs into a trap. The trap was successful with the entire community captured and Smurfette was aghast at her unwitting role in it. However, she was then able to spectacularly undo her mistake by disguising herself as the masked "Lone Smurf" to lure away Gargamel and Azrael on a chase that both allowed her to incapacitate the villains and to free the Smurfs. At the conclusion of the story, any doubts of the Smurfs regarding Smurfette's loyalty were resolved and she was made a welcome permanent member of their village. She quickly rose through the ranks and would sometimes be left in charge of the Smurf village while Papa Smurf was away. One of the show's beloved running gags was Smurfette hugging and kissing Papa Smurf, Smurfette watering her flowers, Smurfette being Painter's favorite object, as well as the other Smurfs, and Smurfette reprimanding Brainy.

Smurfette would be the only girl in the village until season 5, where she got a little sister named Sassette, a little female Smurfling created by the Smurflings.

Smurfette's original artificial nature arose again in the sequel episode, "Smurfette Unmade". In this story, Gargamel tells his apprentice Scruple (who was an added character by this time) about how he regrets creating her; Scruple comments on how bad it is that Gargamel cannot turn her evil again and he remembers there is a way. They kidnap her and prepare a spell which initially does not seem to work and the Smurfs take her home. When Scruple turns on the next page of Gargamel's spellbook, the two of them realize that the spell is complete but its effects will not become apparent until the next full moon's midnight, which happens to be that very night. The effects include Smurfette changing back to her original appearance and malicious personality before she could consult Papa Smurf on the matter. Thus changed into her original form, Smurfette manages to hide by concealing her black hair with a wig (in spite of her clothes and shoes being a dead giveaway) but the Smurfs eventually learn the truth when she arranges for the Smurfs to be captured. Papa Smurf says he cannot repeat the spell that had initially turned her good. However, just as Gargamel is about to get Baby Smurf to test his gold-making potion (over Smurfette's objections), Smurfette's conscience rebels and she changes back into her blond-haired form. Gargamel and Scruple attempt to capture her to prevent themselves from losing again, but Smurfette destroys the potions and sends the Smurfs' archenemies into a tree. They all return home, with Papa Smurf guessing that Smurfette's Smurf nature is too strong to ever be fully removed.

== Voices ==
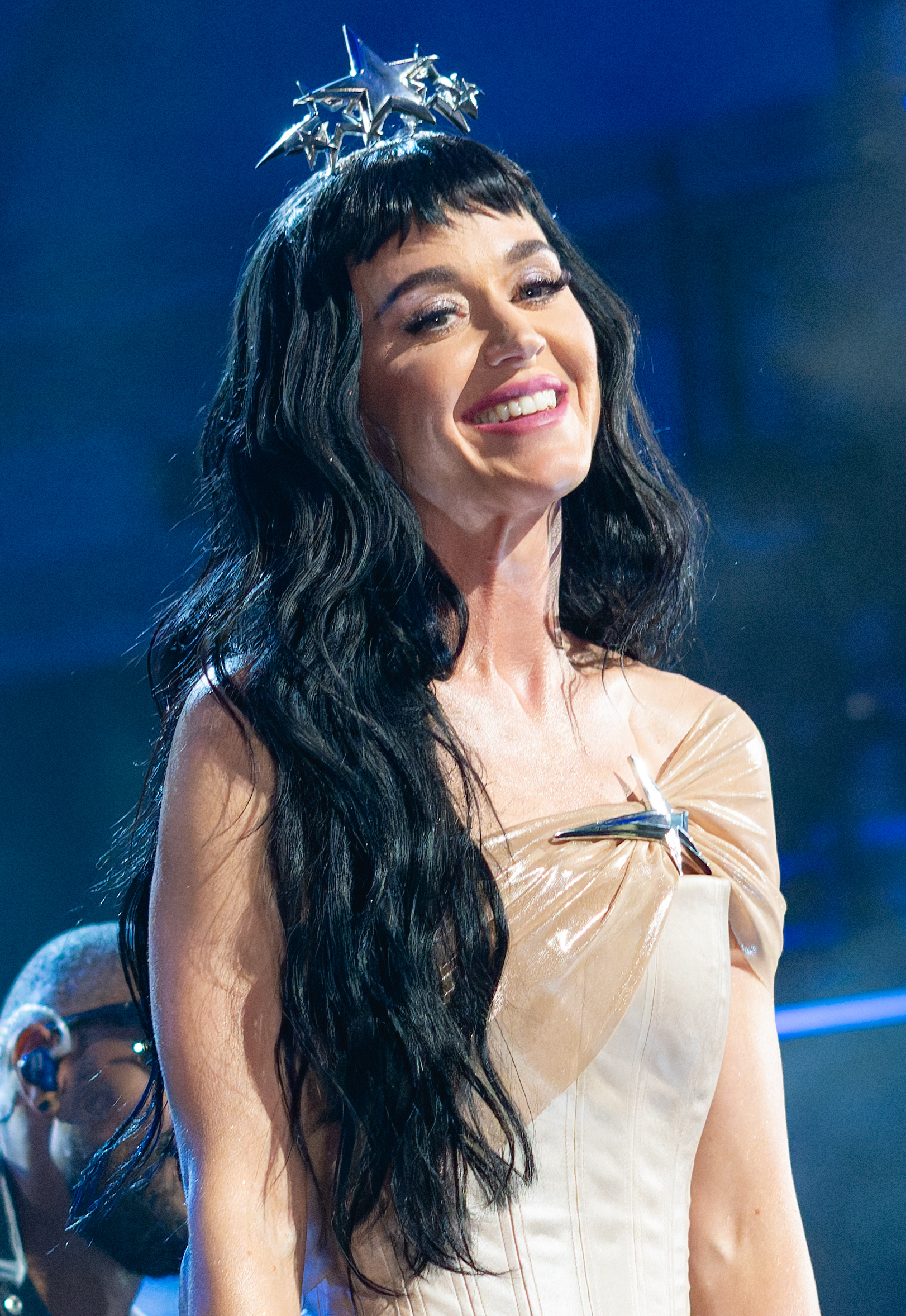
Katy Perry voiced the character in The Smurfs and The Smurfs 2.

Lucille Bliss was the voice of Smurfette in 219 episodes of the 1981 TV series. Smurfette is voiced by pop singer Katy Perry in the 2011 film and its 2013 sequel, Melissa Sturm in The Smurfs: A Christmas Carol and The Smurfs: The Legend of Smurfy Hollow and Demi Lovato in Smurfs: The Lost Village. Anna Ramade and Bérangére McNeese voice her in the 2021 TV series. Rihanna voices her in the 2025 film.

== The Smurfette Principle ==
Smurfette became the popular example of a trope that was soon baptized with her name by Katha Pollitt. Smurfette, like many female characters in TV and movies, is the only female in an otherwise all-male cast, thus this is called "The Smurfette Principle". Other such characters include Miss Piggy of the Muppets or Princess Leia in Star Wars. Critics have pointed out that this lone female character is normally a stereotype of femininity and the object of desire, therefore offering a very limited depiction of women, although versions of the franchise's depiction of gender vary, including of Smurfette herself.

== See also ==
- List of The Smurfs characters
