= The Smurfs: The Legend of Smurfy Hollow =

- DVD cover
- Directed by: Stephan Franck
- Written by: Todd Berger
- Based on: The Smurfs by Peyo; "The Legend of Sleepy Hollow" by Washington Irving
- Produced by: Mary Ellen Bauder
- Starring: Melissa Sturm; Fred Armisen; Alan Cumming; Anton Yelchin; Hank Azaria; Jack Angel; John Oliver; Gary Basaraba; Adam Wylie; Frank Welker
- Narrated by: Tom Kane
- Cinematography: Arthur D. Noda
- Music by: Christopher Lennertz
- Production companies: Sony Pictures Animation; Sony Pictures Imageworks; Duck Studios
- Distributed by: Sony Pictures Home Entertainment
- Release dates: June 11, 2013 (AIAFF); September 10, 2013 (DVD)
- Running time: 22 minutes
- Country: United States
- Language: English

The Smurfs: The Legend of Smurfy Hollow is a 2013 direct-to-video American animated comedy adventure short film based on The Smurfs comic book series created by the Belgian comics artist Peyo. A sequel to The Smurfs 2 and The Smurfs: A Christmas Carol, the short was written by Todd Berger and directed by Stephan Franck, and it stars the voices of Melissa Sturm, Fred Armisen, Anton Yelchin and Hank Azaria. The film was produced by Sony Pictures Animation with the animation by Sony Pictures Imageworks and Duck Studios. The Smurfs: The Legend of Smurfy Hollow was released on DVD on September 10, 2013. The film is loosely based on Washington Irving's 1820 short story "The Legend of Sleepy Hollow".

== Plot ==
Clumsy, Hefty, and Panicky are out in the forest at night with a cart full of smurfberries that has a broken wheel. Unable to fix the wheel, they sit together around a campfire roasting smurfberries when Clumsy has the idea of telling a ghost story to pass the time. Narrator then joins the three Smurfs to tell his own kind of ghost story.

The Smurfs gather around for Papa to announce the Smurfberry Harvest contest, in which the Smurfs who collect the most smurfberries will be awarded a medal. As the Smurfs collect their buckets and then go out into the forest to pick smurfberries, Gutsy follows Brainy, who has won the contest nine times, to find out where he has been getting all the smurfberries for winning the contest. He discovers that it is in a place called Smurfy Hollow, an area with a secret patch of smurfberries where the Headless Horseman resides. Gutsy creates a shadow figure of the Headless Horseman, which sends Brainy running in fear. While Gutsy uses this opportunity to collect the smurfberries, Brainy encounters a trap set up by Gargamel.

Suspicious Smurf begins to wonder where Brainy is, since he has not shown up with his bucket of smurfberries. Realizing that he may be found out for cheating, Gutsy goes out into the forest alone to find Brainy, but is soon joined by Smurfette, who finds out from Gutsy that Brainy is in Smurfy Hollow. They both go together and find Brainy in a cage trap set up by Gargamel, only to soon join him in cage traps of their own.

Gutsy, Brainy, and Smurfette work on a plan to get themselves out of their cages. Gutsy swings his cage repeatedly until it bumps into Brainy's, starting a chain reaction that breaks the cages. However, Smurfette is still stuck in her cage, and Gutsy and Brainy try to figure out how to get her out of there when Gargamel appears with Azrael. The Smurfs go into hiding while the evil wizard opens the cage to deal with the one Smurf that is still captured.

Soon, the Headless Horseman appears, and they start running toward the covered bridge, which keeps the Headless Horseman trapped in Smurfy Hollow. However, the Smurfs see that they would not get to the bridge in time to escape from the Headless Horseman. They hitch a ride on the back of a bat and fly to the top of the bridge. Gargamel and Azrael soon reach the bridge, from which they taunt the Horseman. The Horseman throws a flaming pumpkin that causes the floor beneath Gargamel and Azrael to break, sending them down the river and over the waterfall.

With the three Smurfs returning safely home, Gutsy and Brainy begin to apologize for what they did, with Gutsy admitting that he was jealous about Brainy always winning and Brainy admitting that he was selfish in keeping the secret patch of smurfberries all to himself. Glad to see that they have learned their lesson, Papa gives Gutsy the medal, but both he and Brainy insist that the other should have it. As they fight, the medal flies out of their hands and onto Lazy Smurf, thereby declaring him the winner. As the Smurfs gather around the stage to see Gutsy and Brainy dance with each other, Papa goes out into the forest to thank the Headless Horseman, who turns out to be a goat that he used his magic on to appear as a ghost.

With Narrator's ghost story now over, Hefty claims that he was not scared, but finds himself jumping into Narrator’s arms at the sound of a bat screeching. Clumsy sees that they are now surrounded by bats, which scares all four Smurfs and sends them running back to the village.

== Voice cast ==
- Fred Armisen as Brainy Smurf
- Melissa Sturm as Smurfette
- Jack Angel as Papa Smurf
- Alan Cumming as Gutsy Smurf
- Anton Yelchin as Clumsy Smurf
- Hank Azaria as Gargamel
- Tom Kane as Narrator Smurf
- John Oliver as Vanity Smurf
- Gary Basaraba as Hefty Smurf
- Adam Wylie as Panicky Smurf
- Frank Welker as Azrael

== Release ==
The film premiered on June 11, 2013 at the Annecy International Animated Film Festival. The film was released on DVD on September 10, 2013. ABC Family aired the network television premiere of the film on October 27, 2013.

== Critical response ==
The Smurfs: The Legend of Smurfy Hollow was met with positive reviews from critics. Greg Ehrbar of Indie Wire gave the film a positive review, saying "The CG animation in the bookend sequences certainly looks as rich and detailed as they did in the last Smurf feature (and most likely were made from elements carried over from that production into this one)."
