= Jack Angel =

American voice actor and radio personality (1930–2021)

- Angel at TFcon in 2019
- Born: October 24, 1930; Modesto, California, U.S.
- Died: October 18, 2021 (aged 90); Malibu, California, U.S.
- Resting place: Forest Lawn Memorial Park, Hollywood Hills
- Education: San Francisco State University
- Occupations: Voice actor, radio personality
- Years active: 1957–2019
- Spouses: Barbara Angel (div. 1980) Arlene Thornton (m. 1984)
- Children: 3
- Website: jackangel.com

Jack Angel (October 24, 1930 – October 18, 2021) was an American voice actor and radio personality. Angel voiced characters in shows by Hasbro and Hanna-Barbera such as Super Friends, The Transformers and G.I. Joe and was involved in numerous productions by Disney and Pixar. Before becoming involved with voiceover work, Angel was a disc jockey for California radio stations KMPC and KFI.

== Biography ==
Angel was born on October 24, 1930, in Modesto, California, the second child of John Angel, a Greek immigrant, and Lucille (née Parsons). He graduated from San Francisco State University in 1957, and at the same time, he was hired as a disc jockey for a California radio station and decided to focus on a career in radio programs. A decade later, he had become one of the most popular radio personalities with his radio programs being heard on stations KMPC and KFI, Los Angeles.

In the early years of his career, he also landed roles in stage productions at The Actor's Ring and the Portland Civic Theater. It was during his broadcasting career that he began experimenting with voiceovers he would produce for clients; while at KMPC, Angel's demo ended up in the hands of Gary Owens, who already had made his own inroads as an animation voiceover actor and forwarded Angel's demo tape to his agent. After almost 20 years in radio, Angel shifted to voice acting on a full-time basis.

Angel's first jobs in the voice-over industry came in the mid-1970s, voice acting on the series Super Friends, in which he played Hawkman, The Flash and Samurai, including The All-New Super Friends Hour, Challenge of the Superfriends, Super Friends, The Legendary Super Powers Show and Super Powers Team: Galactic Guardians. During that time, he made guest appearances in Scooby-Doo and Scrappy-Doo and The Smurfs.

In the second season of the Transformers series (1985), Angel was the voice of Astrotrain, Smokescreen, Ramjet, and Omega Supreme, and he reprised the roles of Ramjet and Astrotrain in The Transformers: The Movie (1986). In the third and fourth seasons of The Transformers (1986-1987), Angel voiced Ultra Magnus (who had been played by Robert Stack in The Transformers: The Movie) and in the fourth season he voiced Cyclonus following the death of Roger C. Carmel.

He also lent his voice to the character Dr. Zachary Darret in the 1984 CBS animated series Pole Position, and also voiced Wet Suit on Sunbow's G.I. Joe and several characters on Dino-Riders.

In 1995, he was the voice of Nikki in the animated film Balto. He played the SWATbots on Sonic the Hedgehog, The Liquidator on Darkwing Duck, and Nick Fury on Spider-Man: The Animated series.

In 2001, Angel was the voice of "Teddy" in the movie A.I. Artificial Intelligence. He provided voices for animated films such as A Bug's Life, Monsters, Inc., The Incredibles, Ice Age: The Meltdown, Horton Hears a Who!, Toy Story 3, The Prince of Egypt, The Iron Giant, and Aladdin.

Angel also ventured into video games, narrating the cult hit Killer7 as well as playing Wonkers the Watilla in Dreamfall: The Longest Journey, The Mayor in Ratchet & Clank, and Ammand the Corsair in the video game version of Pirates of the Caribbean: At World's End.

In 2002, shortly after the death of Gene Moss, Angel voiced Smokey the Bear in a few public service announcements and radio spots until 2012. In 2007, he voiced an alien called Technorg on Ben 10. He also voiced Papa Smurf in the 2011 special, The Smurfs: A Christmas Carol and the 2013 special, The Smurfs: The Legend of Smurfy Hollow.

=== Nickelodeon ===
Angel's voice work in animated shows for Nickelodeon in the 2000s included:

- Superintendent Chaplin in Hey Arnold!.
- MacTavish in the second part of the episode "Sir Nigel" in The Wild Thornberrys
- The Pirate Captain on the episode of Avatar: The Last Airbender titled "The Waterbending Scroll".
- The Weathered One on an episode of My Life as a Teenage Robot titled "Weapons of Mass Distraction".
- Comrade Chaos on El Tigre: The Adventures of Manny Rivera in the episode "Old Money".

=== Disney and DreamWorks ===
He provided "additional voices" in Toy Story and Toy Story 2, and the voice of Chunk in Toy Story 3.

He also provided additional voices for Scooby-Doo and Scrappy-Doo, The Dukes, Snorks, Dino-Riders, The Smurfs, The Rescuers Down Under, The Little Mermaid, DuckTales the Movie: Treasure of the Lost Lamp, Land of Enchantment, Super Dave: Daredevil for Hire, Aladdin, Hercules, Quest for Camelot, The Iron Giant, Monsters, Inc., Spirited Away, Lilo & Stitch, Treasure Planet, Finding Nemo, The Lorax, Monsters University and Despicable Me 2.

His uncredited voice roles include an Egyptian in the 1998 animated film The Prince of Egypt and Rock in the 2014 American biblical epic film Noah.

== Personal life ==
Angel was married twice. He and his first wife, Barbara Angel, divorced in 1980. Together they had three children. He married talent agent/owner Arlene Thornton in 1984. They lived in Studio City and Malibu, California.

== Death ==
Angel died of natural causes on October 18, 2021, six days before his 91st birthday. On the day of his death, a piece of lost 1980s paraphernalia that contained his voice as the lead role, being the U.S. dub of TUGS, was discovered.

== Filmography ==
=== Animated films ===
Year	Title	Role	Notes
1986	The Transformers: The Movie	Ramjet, Astrotrain	
1986	Voltron: Fleet of Doom	King Zarkon, Cmdr. Cossack	Television Special
1987	Sport Goofy in Soccermania	Beagle Boy #1	Television Special
1987	G.I. Joe: The Movie	Wet Suit	Direct-to-video
1988	Who Framed Roger Rabbit	Toon Shoes	Uncredited
1989	The Little Mermaid	Sailor	
1990	DuckTales the Movie: Treasure of the Lost Lamp	Additional Voices	
1990	The Rescuers Down Under	Additional Voices	
1990	Land of Enchantment	Additional Voices	
1991	Beauty and the Beast	Tom	
1991	An American Tail: Fievel Goes West	Additional Voices	
1992	Porco Rosso	Pilot	2005 English Dub
1992	Aladdin	Arab	
1995	Dragon Ball Z: Wrath of the Dragon	Screaming Man	2006 English Dub
1995	Balto	Nikki	
1995	Toy Story	Rocky Gibraltar	
1996	The Hunchback of Notre Dame	Additional Voices	
1997	Hercules	Builder #2	
1998	Quest for Camelot	Ogre	
1998	Mulan	Ancestor	
1998	A Bug's Life	Thud	
1998	The Prince of Egypt	Egyptian	Uncredited
1999	The Iron Giant	Additional Voices	
1999	Toy Story 2	Rocky Gibraltar	
2001	The Trumpet of the Swan	Justice of the Geese	
2001	Spirited Away	Radish Spirit	2002 English Dub
2001	Atlantis: The Lost Empire	Truck Driver	(ADR group)
2001	Monsters, Inc.	Additional Voices	
2002	Lilo & Stitch	Alien Guard	
2002	Treasure Planet	Grewnge, Police Robot #2	
2003	Finding Nemo	Mr. Johannsen	
2004	The Incredibles	Guard #2	
2005	Wallace & Gromit: The Curse of the Were-Rabbit	Additional Voices	
2006	Ice Age: The Meltdown	Male Ox	
2008	Horton Hears a Who!	Old Time Who	
2008	Immigrants	Longshoreman	English Dub
2008	Roadside Romeo	Additional Voices	
2010	Toy Story 3	Chunk	
2012	The Lorax	Additional Voices	
2013	Monsters University	Earl "The Terror" Thompson	
2013	Despicable Me 2	Additional Voices	

=== Animated series ===
Year	Title	Role	Notes
1977	The All-New Super Friends Hour	Hawkman, Samurai, Dr Lau	5 episodes
1978	Challenge of the Superfriends	The Flash, Hawkman, Samurai	16 episodes
1979	Scooby-Doo and Scrappy-Doo	Jerry Sloan, Brandon Davis, Shadow Creature, Additional voices	2 episodes
1980	Super Friends	The Flash, Hawkman, Samurai	22 episodes
1981–1982	Spider-Man (1981)	Doctor Donald Blake, Man Mountain Marko, Moe	2 episodes
1982–1989	The Smurfs	Homnibus, Additional voices	
1983	Super Friends:The Lost episodes	The Flash, Hawkman, Samurai	8 episodes
1983	The New Scooby and Scrappy-Doo Show	Jerry, Clown, Additional voices	Episode: "The Crazy Carnival Caper"
1984	Pole Position	Dr. Zachary Darrett	13 episodes
1984	Super Friends: The Legendary Super Powers Show	Samurai	2 episodes
1984–1985	Voltron: Defender of the Universe	King Zarkon, Hazar, Commander Cossack; Yurak, Space Marshal Graham, others	122 episodes
1985	The Super Powers Team: Galactic Guardians	The Flash, Samurai and Hawkman	4 episodes
1985–1987	The Transformers	Ramjet, Smokescreen, Omega Supreme; Astrotrain, Ultra Magnus, Cyclonus (following the death of Roger C. Carmel); Basso Profundo, Katsu Don, Sir Wulf and Professor Terranova	
1986	G.I. Joe: A Real American Hero	Wet Suit	16 episodes
1987	The Real Ghostbusters	Captain Jack Higgins	Episode: "Sea Fright"
1987	DuckTales	Quackerbill, Various Spies	2 episodes
1987	Blondie and Dagwood	Mr. Beasley and Herb Woodley	TV special
1988	Jem	Emmet Benton (Jerrica & Kimber's Father)	Episode: "Out of the Past"
1988	Superman	General Hawkins	Episode: "Cybron Strikes"
1988–1991	Teenage Mutant Ninja Turtles (1987 TV series)	REX-1, LEX	2 episodes
1989	Ring Raiders	Make	
1989	Dink, the Little Dinosaur	Hubble	Episode: "Old Timers"
1990	Tiny Toon Adventures	Additional voices	Episode: "The Looney Beginning"
1990–1991	Peter Pan and the Pirates	Robert Mullins, Eucrates Cookson, King Kyros, Olook	
1990–1991	Talespin	Usher, The High Marshal; Barney O'Turret and Detective Thursday	4 episodes
1991–1992	Darkwing Duck	The Liquidator and Monoculo Macawber	8 episodes
1992	Raw Toonage	Cro-Magnum Pi	Episode: "Cro-Magnum Pi"
1993	Sonic the Hedgehog	The SWATbots	All episodes Uncredited
1993	Wild West C.O.W.-Boys of Moo Mesa	Additional voices	Episode: "Circus Daze"
1993–1994	Bonkers	Max Cody, Scribble, Flanigan	4 episodes
1996	The Spooktacular New Adventures of Casper	Count Dracula	Episode: "Paranormal Press/Another Spooky and Poil Moment/Deadstock"
1996	Quack Pack	Old Fisherman	2 episodes
1996	Mortal Kombat: Defenders of the Realm	Oniro, Computer	Episode: "Old Friends Never Die"
1996	The Mask: The Animated Series	Judge, M.P.	Episode: "The Green Marine"
1997	Spider-Man: The Animated Series	Nick Fury	5 episodes
1999	Rugrats	Additional voices	
2000	Hey Arnold!	Superintendent Chaplin	Episode: "Principal Simmons"
2001	Harvey Birdman, Attorney at Law	General, Drunk Man, Additional voices	Episode: "Very Personal Injury"
2003	The Wild Thornberrys	MacTavish	Episode: "Sir Nigel: Part 2"
2005	Grim & Evil	Master Control	Episode: "House of No Tomorrow"
2005	Avatar: The Last Airbender	Pirate Captain, additional voices	2 episodes
2006	Ben 10	Technorg	Episode: "Grudge Match"
2007	My Life as a Teenage Robot	Weathered One, Man, Thug #2	Episode: "Weapons of Mass Distraction"
2007	El Tigre: The Adventures of Manny Rivera	Comrade Chaos	Episode: "Old Money"
2008	ChalkZone	Old Man Year Before That, Old Man Year Before Year Before That	Episode: "The Day ChalkZone Stood Still"
2009–2010	Mater's Tall Tales	Additional voices	3 episodes
2015	Clarence	Howard	Episode: "Spooky Boo"
2016–2017	Transformers Project Nemesis	Ultra Magnus, Ramjet	3 episodes
2019	Care Bears: Unlock the Magic	Val	Episode: "Unlock the Magic: The Beginning"; uncredited; Final role

- Mork & Mindy: The Animated Series — Additional voices
- The Dukes — Additional voices
- Snorks — Additional voices
- Saber Rider and the Star Sheriffs — Additional voices (English dub)
- Denver, the Last Dinosaur — Prof. Chin
- Dino-Riders — Additional voices
- Kid 'n Play – Additional voices
- The Wizard of Oz – Additional voices
- Space Cats — Additional voices
- Where's Waldo? – Additional voices
- ProStars – Additional voices
- The Legend of Prince Valiant — Additional voices
- Super Dave: Daredevil for Hire - Additional voices
- The New Adventures of Captain Planet — Additional voices
- The Fantastic Voyages of Sinbad the Sailor — Additional voices
- All-New Dennis the Menace — Additional voices
- Sonic Underground — Gondar

=== Video games ===
Year	Title	Role	Notes
1995	Star Wars: Dark Forces	Rom Mohc	
1995	Full Throttle	Bolus, Factory Door Guard	
1995	The Dark Eye		
1995	Shannara	Brendel	
1996	Shattered Steel		
1997	Outlaws	Henry' George Bowers, Spitn Jack Sanchez, Cowboy 2	
1998	Grim Fandango	Bruno Martinez, Chepito, Large Hitman, Seaman Naranja	
1999	A Bug's Life	Thud	
1999	Crusaders of Might and Magic	Additional voices	
2001	Throne of Darkness	Zanshin the Dark Shogun	
2002	Ratchet & Clank	Abner Buckwash	
2004	EverQuest II	Tunarian Human Alliance, Stalker Pulsarian, Eldin; The Glademaster, Rulinthus the Treant; Cannix Silverflame, Barwyn Sympronian; Generic Male Barbarian, Generic Male Dwarf Merchant; Generic Male Human Merchant, Generic Male Kerran Merchant	
2004	World of Warcraft		
2005	Shadow of Rome	Vibius Pansa Caetronianus	
2005	Killer7	Narrator	English Dub
2005	Call of Duty 2		
2006	Auto Assault		
2006	Dreamfall: The Longest Journey	Wonkers the Watilla	
2006	Titan Quest	Additional voices	
2006	Gothic 3	Additional voices	English Dub
2007	Supreme Commander	Hex5, QAI	
2007	Pirates of the Caribbean: At World's End	Ammand the Corsair	
2007	Supreme Commander: Forged Alliance	QAI	
2009	Aion		
2009	Watchmen: The End is Nigh	Underboss, Warden	
2009	Wolfenstein	General Zetta	
2010	Supreme Commander 2		
2010	Prison Break: The Conspiracy	Additional voices	
2010	Toy Story 3: The Video Game	Chunk	
2011	Voltron: Defender of the Universe	King Zarkon	Archive footage
2011	The Smurfs Dance Party	Papa Smurf	
2012	The Darkness II	Additional voices	
2012	Resident Evil: Operation Raccoon City	Spec Ops Command	
2012	Call of Duty: Black Ops II	Survivor #3	
2013	The Smurfs 2	Papa Smurf	
2014	Grim Fandango: Remastered	Bruno Martinez, Chepito, Large Hitman and Seaman Naranja	Remastered
2016	Final Fantasy XV	Cid Sophiar	
2018	World of Warcraft: Battle for Azeroth	Lashk	

=== Live action films — Voice ===
- Deal of the Century — Announcer
- Funny Lady — Radio Announcer
- The World's Greatest Lover — Voice on Record
- Trenchcoat — Head Kidnapper
- Joey — Fletcher the Dummy
- Beetlejuice — Voice of The Preacher
- Hook — Pirates (ADR)
- Mom and Dad Save the World — Creature Voice (uncredited)
- Ticks — (ADR)
- The Fifth Element — Alien Commander
- Vendetta — Old Gaspare (ADR)
- A.I. Artificial Intelligence — Teddy
- Looney Tunes: Back in Action — The Crusher
- This is the End — Looping Voice Talent (uncredited)
- Noah — Rock (ADR) (uncredited)

=== Live action ===
- The Young and the Restless — Judge Martin J. Kline
- King B: A Life in Movies — Jack Cole
- Deterrence — Secretary of Defence
- Crime and Punishment in Suburbia — Russ
- Scrubs — PA System Announcer
- Crime Story — Series Narrator

=== Other ===
- The Legend of Paul Bunyan (short) — Narrator
- The Six Million Dollar Man — Voice of Tower Operator
- Metric Meets the Inchworm (short)
- CBS Library — Mister Spitznagle ("The Incredible Book Escape")
- The Tonight Show with Johnny Carson — Promo Announcer
- Silver Spoons — Chess Player
- Amazing Stories — Dog School Security Guard ("The Family Dog")
- Harry and the Hendersons — TV Wrestler
- I Am My Resume (short) — Stan Angeles
- Crime Story — Narrator
- Scrubs — PA System Announcer ("My Waste of Time")
- Brad and Gary (short) — Gary
- The Don of the Flies (short) — Narrator, Stooley, Harry and Moon (He also produced the short)
- The Smurfs: A Christmas Carol — Papa Smurf
- The Smurfs: The Legend of Smurfy Hollow — Papa Smurf
- Recruited (short) — Principal
- TUGS — Captain Star and Narrator, only in test US dub

=== Commercials ===
- United States Forest Service — Smokey Bear (2002—2012)

Preceded by Bill Capizzi; Michael Sorich	Voice of Papa Smurf; 2011-2013; The Smurfs: A Christmas Carol and The Smurfs: The Legend of Smurfy Hollow	Succeeded by Jonathan Winters
