= Healthtex =

Children's clothing brand

- Industry: Children's clothing
- Founded: 1921 (as the Standard Romper Company)
- Headquarters: Merriam, Kansas, U.S.
- Number of employees: 400 people
- Parent: Lollytogs
- Website: www.healthtex.com

Healthtex is a brand of casual clothing for young children ranging from birth to about 12 years of age currently owned by Lollytogs. It was founded in New York City in 1921 by Louis Russek as the Standard Romper Company. The name "Health-Tex" was first used in 1937 to emphasise that the clothing was made from "healthy" (durable) textiles.

For many years, the brand was known for their award-winning advertisements featuring artwork by children's book artist, Susan Perl, the most notable was "The Handy Answers to Hard Questions Asked by Children in the Health-tex Years," which started in 1966. The campaign featured colorful print ads which provided concise answers to some of the questions commonly asked by pre-school age children such as "Why is the sky blue?" and "How do our ears hear?". This campaign helped make the company well-known and ran until the early 1980s. Following this campaign, Dr. Cody Sweet became its national media spokesperson.
