= The Smurfs: A Christmas Carol =

2011 film by Troy Quane

- DVD cover
- Directed by: Troy Quane
- Written by: Todd Berger
- Based on: The Smurfs by Peyo A Christmas Carol by Charles Dickens
- Produced by: Kurt Albrecht
- Starring: George Lopez; Jack Angel; Melissa Sturm; Fred Armisen; Gary Basaraba; Anton Yelchin; Hank Azaria
- Cinematography: James C.J. Williams
- Edited by: Robert Fisher Jr.
- Music by: Christopher Lennertz
- Production companies: Sony Pictures Animation; Sony Pictures Imageworks; Duck Studios
- Distributed by: Sony Pictures Home Entertainment
- Release date: December 2, 2011
- Running time: 22 minutes
- Country: United States
- Language: English

The Smurfs: A Christmas Carol is a 2011 American animated short film based on The Smurfs comic book series created by the Belgian comics artist Peyo, and is an adaptation of Charles Dickens's 1843 novella A Christmas Carol. The animated short was written by Todd Berger and directed by Troy Quane, and it stars the voices of George Lopez, Jack Angel, Melissa Sturm, Fred Armisen, Gary Basaraba, Anton Yelchin and Hank Azaria. The film was produced by Sony Pictures Animation with the animation by Sony Pictures Imageworks and Duck Studios. The Smurfs: A Christmas Carol was released on DVD on December 2, 2011, attached to The Smurfs film.

When Grouchy Smurf behaves badly to everyone and refuses to celebrate Christmas, the Smurfs of Christmas Past, Present and Future teach him to appreciate Christmas or else every Smurf will fall into the hands of Gargamel.

== Plot ==
On Christmas Eve, the Smurfs get ready for their Christmas party. Hefty Smurf and Handy Smurf cut down a Christmas tree, and by Christmas evening, they all finish and start to celebrate with carols. Despite that, Grouchy Smurf usually puts aside his attitude to enjoy Christmas, but he refuses to join the party, and he hates Christmas, much to the other Smurfs’ shock. That night, Papa Smurf creates a concoction in hopes of renewing Grouchy's Christmas spirit. The spirit finds its way into Grouchy's mug of smurfberry nog, which he promptly drinks and passes out. Subsequently, he wakes up; he sees everything around him transform into animation, and finds himself animated too.

Suddenly, he sees an angel appear in his house, who seems to be Smurfette. She explains to him that she is the Smurf of Christmas Past come to teach him a lesson about appreciating Christmas. She shows him past Christmases he shared with his fellow Smurfs which leads into each Smurf receiving their presents from Papa. Grouchy hopes to get a hang-glider, but is repeatedly dismayed by the seemingly repetitive gift of receiving a brand new Smurf hat. After a good-natured yet irritating prank from Jokey, Grouchy loses his cool, sneers at Papa's gift and begins to despise Christmas. Then the Smurf of Christmas Present, who is Brainy Smurf, appears and shows how because of his refusal to help with the Christmas preparations the other Smurfs have to chip in and forgo their other Christmas-related tasks, which ultimately leads to Clumsy Smurf accidentally burning the Christmas tree. The spirit then shows Papa working on the other Smurfs' gift hats and how much love and care he puts into designing and crafting each Smurf's hat. Papa expresses hope that someday Grouchy will learn to appreciate his gift and the love that goes into making it. Grouchy begins to feel guilty for taking Papa's gift for granted.

Then the Smurf of Christmas Future, who appears as Hefty Smurf, shows Grouchy his future. Hefty tells him that if he doesn't change his ways, all of the Smurfs will wander into the forest, hoping to find a way to renew Grouchy's spirit and end up getting captured by Gargamel and his cat Azrael.

Grouchy wakes up on Christmas morning as everything around him goes back to its original form, and the Smurfs come and see him on the Christmas tree decorating it by putting ornaments on it. He admits that he was wrong about Christmas, Christmas isn't a time for hating, it's about having a family who loves him and cares for him, even through he's "Grouchy". Happy to see that Grouchy learned his lesson, Papa Smurf gives him his present first, (admitting that while it isn't the hang glider he has always asked for, it was made specially for him) a new hat, which he wholeheartedly accepts and embraces Papa Smurf, who returns the embrace. He puts the star on the top of the tree and then, upon realizing Papa's words, proceeds to glide down from the tree using his new hat as a makeshift hang glider before crash landing in the snow. Grouchy briefly complains but then jokingly states that he hates "that Christmas comes only once a year". All the Smurfs join together to sing Christmas carols once more and enjoy the holiday as planned.

== Cast ==
- George Lopez as Grouchy Smurf (Ebenezer Scrooge)
- Jack Angel as Papa Smurf
- Melissa Sturm as Smurfette (Ghost of Christmas Past)
- Fred Armisen as Brainy Smurf (Ghost of Christmas Present)
- Gary Basaraba as Hefty Smurf (Ghost of Christmas Future)
- Anton Yelchin as Clumsy Smurf
- Hank Azaria as Gargamel

== Production ==
The Smurfs: A Christmas Carol went into development in December 2010, and was completed in nine months. The short was animated by Sony Pictures Imageworks, which did the CGI, and by Duck Studios, which animated the main, hand-drawn part of the film. The CGI is the same as in the 2011 film, while the hand-drawn part follows the original designs by the Smurfs creator, Peyo, with the help of some of the artists who worked on the 1981 television series. The short's director, Troy Quane, explained that the hand-drawn sequence "...gives us that dream-like moment where he's learning things from these ghosts," and it is "...a nice nod to the Smurfs' history as a hand-drawn comic."

Some of the original cast from the feature film were replaced in the short. Jack Angel, who voiced various characters in the 1980s television series, replaced Don Messick as Papa Smurf. Katy Perry, who was eager to reprise her role of Smurfette, was replaced by Melissa Sturm, due to scheduling conflicts with her tour.

== Release ==
The Smurfs: A Christmas Carol was released on December 2, 2011, only in standard definition, on DVD as part of The Smurfs three-disc holiday gift set. It was released as a stand-alone DVD on September 10, 2013.

== See also ==
- Adaptations of A Christmas Carol
- List of Christmas films
