= Ginny McSwain =

American voice actress, voice casting director, and animation production professional

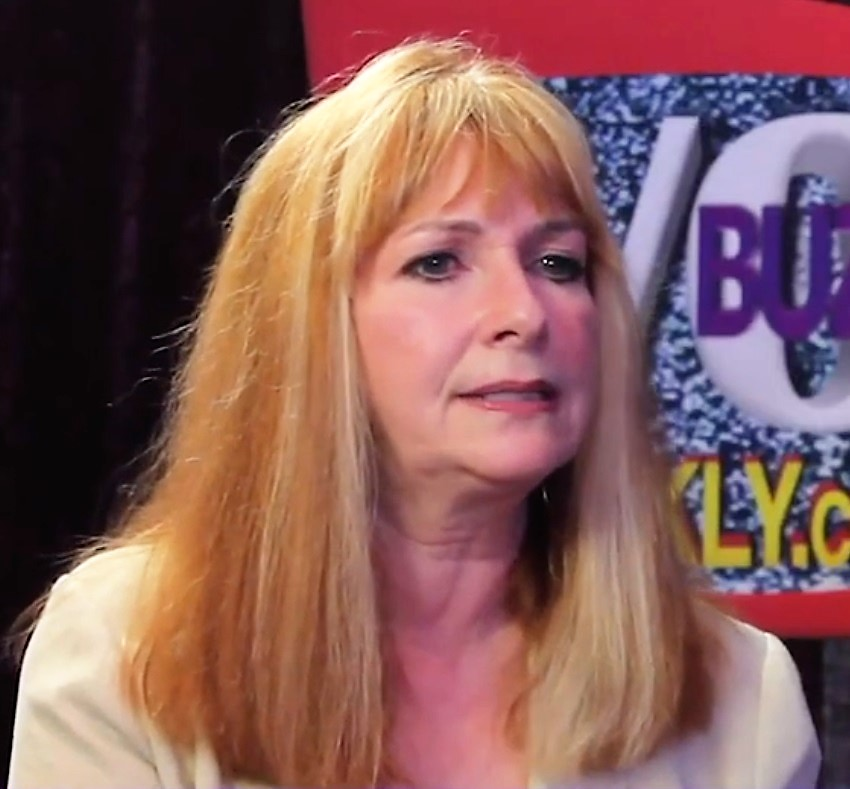
- McSwain on VO Buzz Weekly in 2020
- Education: Stephens College
- Occupations: Voice actress, casting director, voice director
- Years active: 1976–present
- Spouse: Joe Lala (m. 1996; div. 2004)
- Website: http://www.ginnymcswain.com

Ginny McSwain is an American voice director, voice actress and casting director.

== Life and career ==
McSwain graduated from Stephens College in 1974, before moving to Los Angeles. She has worked as casting director on numerous projects for Hanna-Barbera, including The All-New Scooby and Scrappy-Doo Show, The Kwicky Koala Show and The Smurfs. McSwain's first job as voice director was for the English-language version of Lucky Luke. She won a 2006 Daytime Emmy for The Batman and subsequently a 2010 and 2011 Emmy for Fanboy & Chum Chum.

Among her most well-known animation productions are The Adventures of Jimmy Neutron: Boy Genius, My Little Pony, CatDog, the Pajama Sam computer games, Bump in the Night, and Goof Troop.

In 2013, McSwain voice directed Transformers: Rescue Bots, Randy Cunningham: 9th Grade Ninja and Gravity Falls where she voiced Dr. McSwain in the former.

From 2015 to 2021 and 2019 to 2020 respectively, she cast and voice directed If You Give a Mouse a Cookie and The Rocketeer. In 2017, she was the voice director for the first three episodes of the Netflix animated series Spirit Riding Free where she was replaced by Katie McWane.

== Filmography ==
=== Television ===
- Bobby's World - Director (in "Fish Tales" and "The Smell of a Tattletale")
- CB Bears - Sheena
- Galaxy Goof-Ups - Additional Voices
- Superman - Lois Lane, Faora, Ursa
- The All New Popeye Hour - Additional voices
- The New Shmoo - Additional Voices
- Transformers: Rescue Bots - Dr. McSwain
- Yogi's Space Race - Additional Voices

=== Film ===
- Scooby Goes Hollywood - Girl Fan, Kerry, Secretary
- I Know That Voice - Herself

== Crew work ==
- Aladdin - Voice Director (Season 1)
- Alvin and the Chipmunks Meet Frankenstein - Casting Director and Voice Director
- Alvin and the Chipmunks Meet the Wolfman - Casting Director and Voice Director
- Ape Escape - Voice Director
- Bobby's World - Voice Director (80 episodes)
- Bonkers - Voice Director (46 episodes)
- Bump in the Night - Voice Director
- Camp Candy - Casting and Voice Director
- Captain Planet and the Planeteers - Casting Director (seasons 1–2) and Recording Director (Season 4 episodes 1–13)
- Casper - Casting Director and Voice Director (seasons 1–2)
- CatDog - Casting Director
- ChalkZone - Casting and Voice Director
- Charlotte's Web 2: Wilbur's Great Adventure - Casting Director and Voice Director
- Danger Rangers - Casting Director and Voice Director
- Darkwing Duck - Dialogue Director
- Detroit Docona - Voice Director
- Dink, the Little Dinosaur - Voice Director
- Earthworm Jim - Voice Director and Casting director (season 2)
- Fanboy & Chum Chum - Voice Director (2009-2010) (12 episodes)
- G.I. Joe: A Real American Hero - Voice Director ("Operation: Dragonfire" mini-series)
- G.I. Joe: Renegades - Casting and Voice Director
- God of War - Additional Voice-Over Director
- Goof Troop - Dialogue Director
- Gravity Falls - Dialogue Director
- Hellboy: Blood and Iron - Voice Director
- Hellboy: Sword of Storms - Voice Director
- If You Give a Mouse a Cookie - Casting Director and Voice Director
- Jimmy Neutron: Boy Genius - Casting Director
- Kermit's Swamp Years - Voice Casting Director
- Kidd Video - Voice Director
- Kid Icarus: Uprising - Voice Director
- Kid 'n Play - Voice Director
- Little Clowns of Happytown - Voice Director
- Little Wizards - Voice Director
- Lucky Luke - Voice Director
- Marsupilami - Dialogue Director
- Mass Effect - Voice Director
- Mass Effect 2 - Voice Director
- Mass Effect 3 - Voice-Over Director
- Monchhichis - Casting Director
- My Friends Tigger & Pooh - Dialogue Director
- My Little Pony 'n Friends - Voice Director
- Oh Yeah! Cartoons - Casting and Voice Director
- Ozzy & Drix - Casting Director and Voice Director
- Pac-Man - Casting Director
- Pajama Sam: No Need to Hide When It's Dark Outside - Voice Director
- Pole Position - Voice Director
- Poochie - Casting Director
- Pooh's Heffalump Halloween Movie - Dialogue Director
- Problem Child - Voice Director
- Project G.e.e.K.e.R. - Dialogue Director
- ProStars - Voice Director
- Quack Pack - Voice Director
- Random! Cartoons - Voice Director
- Randy Cunningham: 9th Grade Ninja - Dialogue Director (Season 1)
- Raw Toonage - Dialogue Director
- Red Planet - Dialogue Director
- Resident Evil 4 - Voice Director
- Richie Rich - Casting Director
- Shirt Tales - Casting Director
- Siegfried & Roy: Masters of the Impossible - Voice Director
- Sonic the Hedgehog - Casting Director and Voice Director
- Space Stars - Assistant Recording Director
- Spirit Riding Free - Voice Director (3 episodes)
- Superman - Voice Director
- Super Friends - Casting Director
- TaleSpin - Dialogue Director (61 episodes)
- The Adventures of Raggedy Ann and Andy - Casting and Recorder Director
- The Addams Family - Recording Director (Season 2)
- The Adventures of Jimmy Neutron: Boy Genius - Voice Director
- The All-New Scooby and Scrappy-Doo Show - Animation Casting Director
- The Batman - Casting Director and Voice Director (Seasons 1–3)
- The Biskitts - Casting Director
- The Book of Pooh - Dialogue Director
- The Dukes - Casting Director
- The Emperor's New School - Voice Casting Director and Dialogue Director (Season 1)
- The Flintstone Comedy Show - Assistant Recording Director
- The Flintstone Funnies - Assistant Recording Director
- The Fonz and the Happy Days Gang - Casting Director
- The Gary Coleman Show - Casting Director
- The Karate Kid - Voice Director
- The Kwicky Koala Show - Casting Director
- The Little Clowns of Happytown - Voice Director
- The Little Rascals - Casting Director
- The Littles - Voice Director (season 2)
- The Mask: The Animated Series - Voice Director
- The Mork & Mindy / Laverne & Shirley / Fonz Hour - Animation Casting Director ("Laverne and Shirley" segment)
- The New Archies - Casting Director
- The New Scooby and Scrappy-Doo Show - Casting Director
- The New Woody Woodpecker Show - Voice Director
- The Return of Jafar - Voice Director
- The Rocketeer - Casting Director: Additional and Dialogue Director
- The Smurfs - Casting Director (seasons 1–4)
- The Wizard of Oz - Casting Director
- Transformers: Rescue Bots - Casting Director (seasons 2–4) and Voice Director
- Trollkins - Casting Director
- Tutenstein - Dialogue Director (seasons 1–2)
- What-a-Mess - Casting and Voice Director
- Wild West C.O.W.-Boys of Moo Mesa - Voice Director
- Wolf Rock TV - Voice Director
- W.I.T.C.H. - Voice Director
