= 1983–84 United States network television schedule (daytime) =

The following is the 1983–84 daytime network television schedule for the three major English-language commercial broadcast networks in the United States. It covers the weekday and weekend daytime hours from September 1983 to August 1984.

== Legend ==
- Light yellow indicates talk shows.
- Green indicates soap operas.
- Pink indicates game shows.
- Gold indicates news and public affairs programming.
- Light teal indicates sporting events.
- White indicates local programming.
- Light purple indicates children's programming.
- Gray indicates encore programming (e.g., reruns of prime-time programming).
- New series are highlighted in **bold**.

== Schedule ==
- All times correspond to U.S. Eastern and Pacific Time scheduling (except for some live sports or events). Except where affiliates slot certain programs outside their network-dictated timeslots, subtract one hour for Central, Mountain, Alaska, and Hawaii-Aleutian times.
- Local schedules may differ, as affiliates have the option to pre-empt or delay network programs. Such scheduling may be limited to preemptions caused by local or national breaking news or weather coverage (which may force stations to tape delay certain programs to other timeslots) and any major sports events scheduled to air in a weekday timeslot (mainly during major holidays). Stations may air shows at other times at their preference.

=== Monday–Friday ===
Network		6:00 am	6:30 am	7:00 am	7:30 am	8:00 am	8:30 am	9:00 am	9:30 am	10:00 am	10:30 am	11:00 am	11:30 am	noon	12:30 pm	1:00 pm	1:30 pm	2:00 pm	2:30 pm	3:00 pm	4:00 pm	4:30 pm	5:00 pm	5:30 pm	6:00 pm	6:30 pm
ABC	Fall	ABC World News This Morning		Good Morning America				Local/syndicated programming				**Benson**	Loving	Family Feud	Ryan's Hope FYI (12:58; until December 30)	All My Children		One Life to Live FYI (2:58; until December 30)		General Hospital FYI (3:58; until December 30)	The Edge of Night	Local/syndicated programming				ABC World News Tonight
ABC	Summer	ABC World News This Morning		Good Morning America				Local/syndicated programming				**The Love Report**	Loving	Family Feud	Ryan's Hope FYI (12:58; until December 30)	All My Children		One Life to Live FYI (2:58; until December 30)		General Hospital FYI (3:58; until December 30)	The Edge of Night	Local/syndicated programming				ABC World News Tonight
ABC	August	ABC World News This Morning		Good Morning America				Local/syndicated programming				Celebrity Family Feud	Loving	Family Feud	Ryan's Hope FYI (12:58; until December 30)	All My Children		One Life to Live FYI (2:58; until December 30)		General Hospital FYI (3:58; until December 30)	The Edge of Night	Local/syndicated programming				ABC World News Tonight
CBS	Fall	Local/syndicated programming	CBS Early Morning News	The CBS Morning News				Local/syndicated programming		The New $25,000 Pyramid	**Press Your Luck**	The Price Is Right		Local/syndicated programming	The Young and the Restless		As the World Turns		Capitol	Guiding Light	Tattletales	Local/syndicated programming				CBS Evening News with Dan Rather
CBS	Summer	Local/syndicated programming	CBS Early Morning News	The CBS Morning News				Local/syndicated programming		The New $25,000 Pyramid	**Press Your Luck**	The Price Is Right		Local/syndicated programming	The Young and the Restless		As the World Turns		Capitol	Guiding Light	**Body Language**	Local/syndicated programming				CBS Evening News with Dan Rather
NBC	Fall	Local/syndicated programming	NBC News at Sunrise	Today				Local/syndicated programming		Diff'rent Strokes	Sale of the Century	Wheel of Fortune	Dream House	The Facts of Life	Search for Tomorrow	Days of Our Lives		Another World		Fantasy	Local/syndicated programming					NBC Nightly News with Tom Brokaw
NBC	October	Local/syndicated programming	NBC News at Sunrise	Today				Local/syndicated programming		Diff'rent Strokes	Sale of the Century	Wheel of Fortune	Dream House	**GO**	Search for Tomorrow	Days of Our Lives		Another World		Fantasy	Local/syndicated programming					NBC Nightly News with Tom Brokaw
NBC	Late October	Local/syndicated programming	NBC News at Sunrise	Today				Local/syndicated programming		Diff'rent Strokes	Sale of the Century	Wheel of Fortune	Dream House	**GO**	Search for Tomorrow	Days of Our Lives		Another World		**Match Game-Hollywood Squares Hour**	Local/syndicated programming					NBC Nightly News with Tom Brokaw
NBC	Winter	Local/syndicated programming	NBC News at Sunrise	Today				Local/syndicated programming		The Facts of Life	Sale of the Century	Wheel of Fortune	Dream House	**Hot Potato**	Search for Tomorrow	Days of Our Lives		Another World		**Match Game-Hollywood Squares Hour**	Local/syndicated programming					NBC Nightly News with Tom Brokaw
NBC	Summer	Local/syndicated programming	NBC News at Sunrise	Today				Local/syndicated programming		The Facts of Life	Sale of the Century	Wheel of Fortune	**Scrabble**	Diff'rent Strokes	Search for Tomorrow	Days of Our Lives		Another World		**Santa Barbara**	Local/syndicated programming					NBC Nightly News with Tom Brokaw

Notes:

- During the two weeks that the 1984 Summer Olympics was broadcast on ABC, all regular programming was pre-empted except for 40-minute versions of All My Children, One Life to Live, and General Hospital, which ran from July 30 through August 3 from 2 pm ET/11 am PT to 4 pm ET/1 pm PT and August 6 through August 10 from 1 pm ET/10 am PT to 3 pm ET/12 noon PT.
- **The New Newlywed Game** aired on ABC from February 13 to 17, 1984 at 11:00AM EST. Hosted by Jim Lange, it was a test week of shows to see if a daytime version of Newlywed Game might be feasible for ABC. The series did re-emerge eighteen months later in syndication with Bob Eubanks hosting again; he couldn't host the February 1984 week of shows because he was hosting Dream House on NBC at the time.

=== Saturday ===
Network		7:00 am	7:30 am	8:00 am	8:30 am	9:00 am	9:30 am	10:00 am	10:30 am	11:00 am	11:30 am	noon	12:30 pm	1:00 pm	1:30 pm	2:00 pm	2:30 pm	3:00 pm	3:30 pm	4:00 pm	4:30 pm	5:00 pm	5:30 pm	6:00 pm	6:30 pm
ABC	Fall	Local and/or syndicated programming		The Best of Scooby-Doo **Menudo on ABC** (8:25)	**The Monchhichis/Little Rascals/Richie Rich Show**		The Pac-Man/**Rubik, the Amazing Cube** Hour **Menudo on ABC** (10:25)		**The Littles**	The Puppy's Further Adventures	**The New Scooby and Scrappy-Doo Show** Schoolhouse Rock! (11:55)	ABC Weekend Special	American Bandstand		ABC Sports and/or local programming									Local news	ABC World News Saturday
ABC	February	Local and/or syndicated programming		Monchhichis	The Little Rascals/Richie Rich Show Schoolhouse Rock! (8:55)	The New Scooby and Scrappy-Doo Show	The Pac-Man/**Rubik, the Amazing Cube** Hour **Menudo on ABC** (10:25)		**The Littles**	The Puppy's Further Adventures	The Best of Scooby-Doo Menudo on ABC (11:55)	ABC Weekend Special	American Bandstand		ABC Sports and/or local programming									Local news	ABC World News Saturday
CBS	Fall	Captain Kangaroo		**The Biskitts**	**Saturday Supercade**		**Dungeons & Dragons**	The Dukes	**The Charlie Brown and Snoopy Show**	**Benji, Zax & the Alien Prince**	The Bugs Bunny/Road Runner Show			The New Fat Albert Show	CBS Children's Film Festival	CBS Sports and/or local programming								Local news	CBS Evening News
CBS	November	Captain Kangaroo		**The Biskitts**	**Saturday Supercade**		**Dungeons & Dragons**	Plastic Man (R)	**The Charlie Brown and Snoopy Show**	**Benji, Zax & the Alien Prince**	The Bugs Bunny/Road Runner Show			The New Fat Albert Show	CBS Children's Film Festival	CBS Sports and/or local programming								Local news	CBS Evening News
CBS	February	Captain Kangaroo		The Charlie Brown and Snoopy Show	**Saturday Supercade**		**Dungeons & Dragons**	Tarzan, Lord of the Jungle (R)	The Bugs Bunny/Road Runner Show			The Biskitts	Benji, Zax & the Alien Prince	The New Fat Albert Show	CBS Children's Film Festival	CBS Sports and/or local programming								Local news	CBS Evening News
NBC		Local and/or syndicated programming		The Flintstone Funnies	Shirt Tales	The Smurfs			**Alvin and the Chipmunks**	**Mister T**	The Amazing Spider-Man and The Incredible Hulk		Thundarr the Barbarian (R)	NBC Sports and/or local programming										Local news	NBC Nightly News

In the News aired at the end of most of CBS' Saturday morning shows.

One to Grow On aired after the credits of NBC's Saturday morning shows except The Flintstone Funnies, Mister T, and Thundarr the Barbarian.

=== Sunday ===
Network		7:00 am	7:30 am	8:00 am	8:30 am	9:00 am	9:30 am	10:00 am	10:30 am	11:00 am	11:30 am	noon	12:30 pm	1:00 pm	1:30 pm	2:00 pm	2:30 pm	3:00 pm	3:30 pm	4:00 pm	4:30 pm	5:00 pm	5:30 pm	6:00 pm	6:30 pm
ABC		Local and/or syndicated programming							This Week with David Brinkley		ABC Sports and/or local programming													Local news	ABC World News Sunday
CBS	Fall	Captain Kangaroo		Meatballs and Spaghetti (R)	Gilligan's Planet (R)	CBS News Sunday Morning			Face the Nation	Local and/or syndicated programming			The NFL Today	NFL on CBS and/or local programming											
CBS	Mid-winter	Captain Kangaroo		Meatballs and Spaghetti (R)	Gilligan's Planet (R)	CBS News Sunday Morning			Face the Nation	Local and/or syndicated programming		CBS Sports and/or local programming												Local news	CBS Evening News
NBC	Fall	Local and/or syndicated programming										Meet the Press	NFL '83	NFL on NBC and local programming											
NBC	Mid-winter	Local and/or syndicated programming										Meet the Press	NBC Sports and/or local programming											Local news	NBC Nightly News

== By network ==
=== ABC ===
**Returning series**

- ABC Weekend Special
- ABC World News This Morning
- ABC World News Tonight
- All My Children
- American Bandstand
- The Best of Scooby-Doo
- Celebrity Family Feud
- The Edge of Night
- Family Feud
- General Hospital
- Good Morning America
- Loving
- One Life to Live
- Pac-Man
- The Puppy's Further Adventures
- Ryan's Hope
- Schoolhouse Rock!
- This Week with David Brinkley

**New series**

- **Benson** (reruns)
- **The Littles**
- **The Love Report**
- **Menudo on ABC**
- **The Monchhichis/Little Rascals/Richie Rich Show**
- **The New Scooby and Scrappy-Doo Show**
- **Rubik, the Amazing Cube**

**Canceled/Ended**

- The Best of the Super Friends
- The Love Boat (reruns)
- Mork & Mindy/Laverne & Shirley/Fonz Hour
- The Pac-Man/Little Rascals/Richie Rich Show
- The Scooby & Scrappy-Doo/Puppy Hour
- Too Close For Comfort (reruns)

=== CBS ===
**Returning series**

- The $25,000 Pyramid
- As the World Turns
- The Bugs Bunny/Road Runner Show
- Capitol
- Captain Kangaroo
- CBS Children's Film Festival
- CBS Evening News
- CBS Morning News
- CBS News Sunday Morning
- The Dukes
- Face the Nation
- Guiding Light
- Gilligan's Planet (reruns)
- Meatballs and Spaghetti (reruns)
- The New Fat Albert Show
- Plastic Man (reruns)
- The Price Is Right
- Tarzan, Lord of the Jungle (reruns)
- Tattletales
- The Young and the Restless

**New series**

- **Benji, Zax & the Alien Prince**
- **The Biskitts**
- **Body Language**
- **The Charlie Brown and Snoopy Show**
- **Dungeons & Dragons**
- **Press Your Luck**
- **Saturday Supercade**

**Canceled/Ended**

- Blackstar (reruns)
- Child's Play
- The Kwicky Koala Show
- The New $25,000 Pyramid
- Pandamonium
- The Popeye and Olive Comedy Show
- Speed Buggy (reruns)
- Sunrise Semester
- Sylvester & Tweety, Daffy, and Speedy Show

=== NBC ===
**Returning series**

- Another World
- Days of Our Lives
- Diff'rent Strokes (reruns)
- Dream House
- The Facts of Life (reruns)
- Fantasy
- The Flintstone Funnies
- The Incredible Hulk
- Meet the Press
- NBC News at Sunrise
- NBC Nightly News
- Sale of the Century
- Search for Tomorrow
- Shirt Tales
- The Smurfs
- Spider-Man and His Amazing Friends
- Thundarr the Barbarian (reruns)
- Today
- Wheel of Fortune

**New series**

- **Alvin and the Chipmunks**
- **GO**
- **Hot Potato**
- **Match Game-Hollywood Squares Hour**
- **Mister T**
- **Santa Barbara**
- **Scrabble**

**Canceled/Ended**

- The Doctors
- The Gary Coleman Show
- Hit Man
- The Jetsons (reruns)
- Just Men!
- The New Adventures of Flash Gordon
- The New Battlestars
- Texas

== See also ==
- 1983-84 United States network television schedule (prime-time)
- 1983-84 United States network television schedule (late night)

== Sources ==
- https://web.archive.org/web/20071015122215/http://curtalliaume.com/abc_day.html
- https://web.archive.org/web/20071015122235/http://curtalliaume.com/cbs_day.html
- https://web.archive.org/web/20071012211242/http://curtalliaume.com/nbc_day.html
