= The Monchhichis/Little Rascals/Richie Rich Show =

- Title card
- Directed by: George Gordon; Bob Hathcock; Carl Urbano; Rudy Zamora; Ray Patterson; Oscar Dufau; John Walker
- Voices of: Julie McWhirter Dees; Patty Maloney; Scott Menville; Shavar Ross; B.J. Ward; Peter Cullen; Ellen Gerstell; Sidney Miller; Bobby Morse; Frank Nelson; Laurel Page; Hank Saroyan; Dick Beals; William Callaway; Nancy Cartwright; Al Fann; Joan Gerber; Christian Hoff; Stanley Jones; Sparky Marcus; Frank Welker
- Theme music composer: Hoyt Curtin
- Country of origin: United States
- Original language: English
- No. of episodes: 15

Production
- Executive producers: William Hanna; Joseph Barbera
- Running time: 60 minutes
- Production companies: Hanna-Barbera Productions; King World Productions

Original release
- Network: ABC
- Release: September 10, 1983 – September 1, 1984

The Monchhichis/Little Rascals/Richie Rich Show is a 60-minute American Saturday morning animated package show co-produced by Hanna-Barbera Productions and King World Productions and broadcast on ABC from September 10, 1983, to September 1, 1984. The show contained the following three segments: Monchhichis, The Little Rascals and Richie Rich.

== Plot and segments ==
The package show combined new episodes and reruns of The Little Rascals and Richie Rich with the new Monchhichis series. The segments for each sixty-minute episode were as follows:

- Monchhichis (30 minutes)
- The Little Rascals (11 minutes)
- Richie Rich Zillion-Dollar Adventures (11 minutes)

The Monchhichis segment aired as part of the package show through the end of 1983. As early as January 7, 1984, because of lower-than-anticipated ratings (especially since it faced very tough competition against another HB series, the high-rated The Smurfs on NBC), the package show was revamped, and became a half-hour Little Rascals/Richie Rich Show.

== Ownership ==
Since The Little Rascals segment was co-produced by King World Productions, the rights to that segment are under different ownership than the others – CBS Media Ventures currently owns the rights. The Richie Rich and Monchhichis segments have been incorporated into the Warner Bros. library, due to various corporate changes involving Hanna-Barbera.

== Home media ==
In 2010, one episode ("Tickle Pickle") was part of the Saturday Morning Cartoons: The 80s DVD set. Warner Archive released all 13 episodes of the Monchhichis as a made-on-demand DVD set in April 2017. The Little Rascals is not cleared for a DVD release, as was mentioned on the Warner Archive group on Facebook in April 2016, and many of the Richie Rich segments in this series were part of two VHS compilations: Richie Rich: A Dog's Best Friend and Richie Rich: Priceless Toys, both of which were released in April 1995. As of August 2018, there are no plans for a full DVD set of all of the Richie Rich segments, but virtually all of the Richie Rich segments from this series are available for free viewing on Boomerang's website, but only within the United States.

== Voice cast ==
=== Monchhichis ===
- Bobby Morse – Moncho
- Laurel Page – Kyla
- Ellen Gerstell – TooToo
- Frank Welker – Patchitt
- Hank Saroyan – Thumkitt
- Sidney Miller – Horrg
- Frank Nelson – Wizzar
- Robert Arbogast – Snogs
- Peter Cullen – Shreeker, Snitchitt, Gonker
- Laurie Faso – Yabbott, Fasit, Scumgor

=== The Little Rascals ===
- Scott Menville – Spanky
- Julie McWhirter Dees – Alfalfa, Porky, Woim
- Patty Maloney – Darla
- Shavar Ross – Buckwheat
- B. J. Ward – Butch, Waldo
- Peter Cullen – Pete the Pup, Officer Ed

=== Richie Rich ===
- Sparky Marcus – Richie Rich
- Christian Hoff – Freckles Friendly
- Nancy Cartwright – Gloria Glad
- Joan Gerber – Mrs. Rich, Irona
- Stanley Jones – Cadbury, George
- Bill Callaway – Professor Keenbean
- Dick Beals – Reggie Van Dough
- Frank Welker – Dollar the Dog
