= Monchhichis (TV series) =

US television program

- Genre: Comedy; Fantasy; Adventure
- Based on: Monchhichis by Yoshiharu Washino
- Directed by: Oscar Dufau; George Gordon; Carl Urbano; John Walker; Rudy Zamora
- Voices of: Ellen Gerstell; Sidney Miller; Bobby Morse; Frank Nelson; Laurel Page; Hank Saroyan; Frank Welker
- Theme music composer: Hoyt Curtin
- Opening theme: "Monchhichis"
- Ending theme: "Monchhichis" (instrumental)
- Composer: Hoyt Curtin
- Country of origin: United States
- Original language: English
- No. of episodes: 13

Production
- Executive producers: William Hanna; Joseph Barbera
- Producers: George Singer; Iwao Takamoto (creative producer)
- Editor: Gil Iverson
- Running time: 22 minutes approx.
- Production company: Hanna-Barbera Productions

Original release
- Network: ABC
- Release: September 10 – December 3, 1983

Monchhichis is an American animated series based on the stuffed toyline of dolls, released by the Japanese company Sekiguchi Corporation. Produced by Hanna-Barbera, it premiered on ABC on September 10, 1983 as part of The Monchhichis/Little Rascals/Richie Rich Show, replacing Pac-Man (which had by then been given its own half-hour time slot) from the previous season.

The series aired as part of a package show with The Little Rascals and Richie Rich through the end of 1983, but as early as January 7, 1984, because of lower-than-anticipated ratings, the package show was split up into two separate half-hour shows - Monchhchis moved to 8:00 a.m. ET, switching slots with The New Scooby and Scrappy-Doo Show (which aired initially at 11:30 a.m. ET), the latter of which would move to 9:00 a.m. ET and The Little Rascals and Richie Rich remained in the 8:30 a.m. ET slot, as a downgraded package series The Little Rascals/Richie Rich Show for the remainder of the 1983-84 season.

The half-hour episodes were later re-aired as part of the USA Cartoon Express during the late 1980s.

== Plot ==
The Monchhichis are monkey-like creatures who live in the forest land of Monchia at the very top of tall trees well above the clouds. The tribe's leader Wizzar is a magical wizard who can make up spells and potions to defeat their enemy, Horrg and the evil Grumplins of Grumplor.

== Cast ==
- Robert Arbogast as Snogs
- Peter Cullen as Snitchit, Gonker
- Laurie Faso as Scumgor, Yabbot
- Ellen Gerstell as Tootoo
- Hettie Lynne Hurtes
- Laurie Main
- Joe Medalis
- Sidney Miller as Horgg
- Bobby Morse as Moncho
- Frank Nelson as Wizzar
- Laurel Page as Kyla
- Hank Saroyan as Thumkii
- Rick Segall
- Frank Welker as Patchit
- Bill Woodson

== Episodes ==
No.	Title	Written by	Original release date
1	"Tickle Pickle"	Dick Robbins & Bryce Malek	September 10, 1983
2	"TooToo Trouble"	Dick Robbins & Bryce Malek	September 17, 1983
3	"Double Play"	Bob Langhans	September 24, 1983
4	"Swamp Secret"	Douglas Booth	October 1, 1983
5	"Dueling Wizzars"	Dick Robbins & Bryce Malek	October 8, 1983
6	"Thumkii's Pet"	Donald F. Glut	October 15, 1983
7	"Misfit Grumplin"	Evelyn A-R Gabai	October 22, 1983
8	"Jingle Pods"	Unknown	October 29, 1983
9	"Moncho's Gift"	Dick Robbins & Bryce Malek	November 5, 1983
10	"Cloud City"	Douglas Booth	November 12, 1983
11	"Helpless Hero"	Evelyn A-R Gabai	November 19, 1983
12	"Grumpstaff Grief"	Larry Parr	November 26, 1983
13	"Charm Alarm"	Dick Robbins & Bryce Malek	December 3, 1983

== Home media ==
An episode of the show ("Tickle Pickle") was released as part of Saturday Morning Cartoons: The 1980s DVD set by Warner Home Video in 2010. In April 2017, Warner Archive released Monchhichis: The Complete Series on DVD in region 1, as part of their Hanna-Barbera Classic Collection. This is a Manufacture-on-Demand (MOD) release, available exclusively through Warner's online store and Amazon.com.
