= Trollkins =

- Genre: Fantasy; Comedy
- Directed by: George Gordon; Carl Urbano; Rudy Zamora
- Voices of: Michael Bell; Bill Callaway; Jennifer Darling; Marshall Efron; Alan Oppenheimer; Hank Saroyan; Steve Spears; Frank Welker; Paul Winchell
- Composer: Hoyt Curtin
- Country of origin: United States
- Original language: English
- No. of episodes: 13 (26 segments)

Production
- Executive producers: William Hanna; Joseph Barbera
- Producers: Kay Wright; Iwao Takamoto (creative producer)
- Editor: Gil Iverson
- Running time: 21 minutes (whole); 11 minutes (separate)
- Production company: Hanna-Barbera Productions

Original release
- Network: CBS
- Release: September 12 – December 5, 1981

Trollkins is a 1981 American animated series produced by Hanna-Barbera Productions that aired for one season on CBS. Essentially a cross between The Smurfs (which incidentally premiered the same day, September 12, 1981, in the same time slot at 8:30 ET) and The Dukes of Hazzard, it followed the misadventures of trolls Blitz, Pixlee, and Flooky.

== Plot ==
The Trollkins are a race of small trolls with green, blue, and purple faces who live in a tree community called Trolltown. The episodes follow the adventures of Blitz (voiced by Steve J. Spears), Pixlee (voiced by Jennifer Darling), and their pet companion Flooky (voiced by Frank Welker). Blitz's father Mayor Lumpkin (voiced by Paul Winchell) was somewhat of a short, incompetent, hot-headed, fumble-mouth of a mayor who spoke in spoonerisms.

Pixlee's father Sheriff Trollsom (voiced by Alan Oppenheimer), more mild-mannered than Mayor Lumpkin, and his two deputies Dotty and Flake (voiced by Jennifer Darling and Marshall Efron) were just as incompetent and fumble-minded in maintaining order in Trolltown. Nevertheless, there was no complete love lost amongst the citizens of Trolltown despite the continuous escapades, including those involving a renegade motorcycle gang known as the Troll Choppers (much like the Chopper Bunch from Wheelie and the Chopper Bunch) who terrorized the citizens of Trolltown from time to time, but were merely a nuisance rather than a threat to everyone.

== Cast ==
- Michael Bell as Grubb Trollmaine
- Bill Callaway as Slug
- Jennifer Darling as Pixlee Trollsom, Deputroll Dotty
- Marshall Efron as Deputroll Flake
- Alan Oppenheimer as Sheriff Pudge Trollsom
- Hank Saroyan as Afid
- Steve Spears as Blitz
- Frank Welker as Bogg, Flooky, Top Troll
- Paul Winchell as Mayor Lumpkin

=== Additional voices ===
- Jared Barclay
- Mel Blanc
- Scatman Crothers
- Peter Cullen
- Billie Hayes
- Ken Mars
- Don Messick
- Robert Allen Ogle
- Bob Sarlatte
- Marilyn Schreffler
- Rick Segall
- Hal Smith
- John Stephenson
- Lennie Weinrib
- Alan Young

== Episodes ==
No.	Title	Written by	Original release date
1	"Trolltown Goes Trollywood" "Trolltown Meets Kling Kong"	Bob Ogle Dick Robbins	September 12, 1981
2	"The Case of the Missing Trollosaurus" "The Trollerbear Scare"	Jim Ryan Mark Evanier	September 19, 1981
3	"Escape from Alcatroll" "The Trollness Monster"	Jeffrey Scott J.R. Young	September 26, 1981
4	"The Trollchoppers Meet Frogzilla" "Robotroll"	Jeffrey Scott	October 3, 1981
5	"Trollyapolis 500" "Trollin the Magician"	Unknown	October 10, 1981
6	"The Great Troll Train Wreck" "Trolltown Goes Ga-Ga"	Jeffrey Scott	October 17, 1981
7	"Treasure of Troll Island" "Mirror, Mirror on the Troll"	Unknown	October 24, 1981
8	"The Empire Strikes Trolltown" "Raiders of the Lost Troll"	Jeffrey Scott	October 31, 1981
9	"The Moth That Ate Trolltown" "Fine Feathered Lumpkin"	Unknown	November 7, 1981
10	"Bermuda Trollangle" "Supertroll"	Michael Maurer	November 14, 1981
11	"Flooky and the Troll Burglar" "Dr. Frankentroll, I Presume"	Jeffrey Scott	November 21, 1981
12	"The Abominable Trollman" "The Trollcat in the Trollhat"	Unknown	November 28, 1981
13	"Agent Double-O-Troll" "Pixlee and the Seven Trolls"	Unknown	December 5, 1981

== Broadcast history ==
- September 12, 1981 – September 4, 1982 – CBS
- 1985–91 – USA Cartoon Express
- 1992–2001 – Cartoon Network
- April 1, 2000–10 – Boomerang (on occasions)
