= Richie Rich (1980 TV series) =

American animated television series (1980–1984)

- Genre: Adventure
- Based on: Richie Rich by: Alfred Harvey; Warren Kremer
- Directed by: Ray Patterson; George Gordon; Rudy Zamora; Bob Hathcock (1982–84); Carl Urbano (1982–84)
- Voices of: Dick Beals; William Callaway; Nancy Cartwright; Al Fann; Joan Gerber; Christian Hoff; Stanley Jones; Sparky Marcus; Frank Welker
- Country of origin: United States
- Original language: English
- No. of seasons: 4
- No. of episodes: 42 (103 segments)

Production
- Executive producers: William Hanna; Joseph Barbera
- Producers: Don Jurwich (1980–81); Oscar Dufau (1982–84)
- Production companies: Hanna-Barbera Productions; Harvey Films

Original release
- Network: ABC
- Release: November 8, 1980 – September 1, 1984

Richie Rich is an American Saturday morning animated series produced by Hanna-Barbera Productions and was broadcast on ABC from November 8, 1980, to September 1, 1984, based upon the Harvey Comics character of the same name. The series shared time slots with Scooby-Doo and Scrappy-Doo, The Little Rascals, Pac-Man and Monchhichis over its original four-year broadcast run. 13 half-hours were produced, split into segments of 12, 7 and 4 minutes.

Many of the titles of segments were never revealed on air, but the titles were used in comic book issues then recently published at the time of production.

In 1988, the series was re-broadcast as part of the weekend/weekday programming block The Funtastic World of Hanna-Barbera.

The series was also the voice acting debut for Nancy Cartwright who has since become better known as the voice of Bart Simpson.

== Plot ==
This show details the various adventures of Richie Rich, his family, and his friends.

== Segments ==
Richie Rich's adventures are sorted into different segments:

- Richie Rich Riches – 7 minutes - These segments deal with threats to the Rich family or more specifically Richie.
- Richie Rich Treasure Chest – 3 minutes - These segments revolve around Dollar and/or Cadbury.
- Richie Rich Gems – 30 seconds - These short segments were based on one-page comic book stories.
- Richie Rich Zillion-Dollar Adventures – 11 minutes - These segments deal with Richie Rich and his friends fighting master criminals, aliens, and other threats to the world. While Dr. Blemish appeared in one episode, some episodes have an exclusive villain called the Collector as a recurring enemy.

== Adaptation changes ==
The animated series took a number of liberties from the original comics:

- Richie is depicted as slightly older, inconsistently voiced as a child between 10 and 14, and wears a red sweater with a large "R" on the front as well as long trousers. In the comics, he wears a black suit with a red bow tie and blue short pants.
- Gloria is shown as the same age as Richie and wears a white long-sleeved a blouse, pantyhose, purple sweater or sweater vest and purple mini skirt. In the comics, she wore a bow in her hair and wore a white blouse with a short skirt supposedly made of tartan.
- Dollar is more anthropomorphized with Walter Mitty-like fantasies. Dollar is similar to Scooby-Doo.
- Irona the Robot Maid is given a greater presence in the series with additional duties as Richie's personal bodyguard as seen in the "Zillion Dollar Adventures" segments. To fulfill that role, Irona can convert her body into various alternative modes as necessary. For instance, the moment she receives a summons from Richie, she would change her body into a jet plane mode and immediately fly to the boy.

== Broadcast history ==
Richie Rich was originally broadcast in these following formats on ABC:

- The Richie Rich/Scooby-Doo Show (November 8, 1980 – September 18, 1982)
- The Pac-Man/Little Rascals/Richie Rich Show (September 25, 1982 – September 3, 1983)
- The Monchhichis/Little Rascals/Richie Rich Show (September 10, 1983 – September 1, 1984)

It later aired on CBS as reruns from January 11 to August 30, 1986, and then again from November 15 to December 27 the same year.

== Episodes ==
=== Season 1 – The Richie Rich/Scooby-Doo Show ===
#	Episode Title	Airdate
1	Riches: Piggy Bank Prank; Gems #1: Pictures; Treasure Chest: Muscle Beach; Gems #2: Sunlamp; Zillion Dollar Adventures: The Robotnappers	November 8, 1980
2	Riches: The Rare Scare; Gems #1: Diamond; Treasure Chest: Kitty Sitter; Gems #2: Computer; Zillion Dollar Adventures: One of Our Aircraft Carriers is Missing	November 15, 1980
3	Riches: Spring Cleaning; Gems #1: Pillows; Treasure Chest: Silence is Golden; Gems #2: Wishing Well; Zillion Dollar Adventures: The Shocking Lady Strikes Again	November 22, 1980
4	Riches: The Blur; Gems #1: Phone Call; Treasure Chest: Cur Wash; Gems #2: Santi Clause; Zillion Dollar Adventures: The Kangaroo Hop	November 29, 1980
5	Riches: Irona Versus Demona; Gems #1: Monkey; Treasure Chest: Chef's Surprise; Gems #2: Piggie Bank; Zillion Dollar Adventures: The Snow Bounders	December 6, 1980
6	Riches: Counterfeit Dollar; Gems #1: Long Distance Call; Treasure Chest: Miss Robot America; Gems #2: Feed The Fish; Zillion Dollar Adventures: Who's Afraid of Big Bad Bug	December 13, 1980
7	Riches: The Abominable Snowman; Gems #1: Roughing It; Treasure Chest: The Greatest Invention in the World; Gems #2: A Box of Chocolates; Zillion Dollar Adventures: Constructo	December 20, 1980
8	Riches: Poor Little Richbillies; Gems #1: The Telephone; Treasure Chest: TV Dollar; Gems #2: Stupendous Vehicle; Zillion Dollar Adventures: Mystery Mountain	December 27, 1980
9	Riches: Wiped Out; Gems #1: Tickets; Treasure Chest: Chowhound; Gems #2: Big House; Zillion Dollar Adventures: Disaster Master	January 3, 1981
10	Riches: It's No Giggling Matter; Gems #1: Lunch; Treasure Chest: Welcome Uncle Cautious; Gems #2: The Vault Leak; Zillion Dollar Adventures: Disappearing Dignitaries	January 10, 1981
11	Riches: Prankster Beware; Gems #1: Ordinary Farm; Treasure Chest: Clothes Make the Butler; Gems #2: Name That Person; Zillion Dollar Adventures: Phantom of the Movies	January 17, 1981
12	Riches: The Most Unforgettable Butler; Gems #1: Monkey Under Foot; Treasure Chest: Young Irona; Gems #2: Rainbow; Zillion Dollar Adventures: The Great Charity Train Robbery	January 24, 1981
13	Riches: Cowboy Richie; Gems #1: Mom's Jewels; Treasure Chest: Baseball Dollar; Gems #2: The Eye's Have It; Zillion Dollar Adventures: Sinister Sports Spectacular	January 31, 1981

=== Season 2 – The Richie Rich/Scooby-Doo Show ===
#	Title/Plot	Airdate
14	Space Shark; Treasure Chest; The Chef's Watch Dog; Gems; Schoolhouse Romp	September 19, 1981
15	Richie of the Round Table; Treasure Chest; I Want My Mummy; Gems; Canine Cadet	September 26, 1981
16	Voodoo Island; Treasure Chest; Tooth is Stranger Than Friction; Gems; Butlering Made Easy	October 3, 1981
17	A Special Talent; Treasure Chest; Villains Incorporated; Gems; Bye-Bye Baby	October 10, 1981
18	Rich Mice; Treasure Chest; King Bee; Gems; Chilly Dog	October 17, 1981
19	Money Talks; Treasure Chest; Mischief Movie; Gems; An Ordinary Day	October 24, 1981
20	Dog Gone; Treasure Chest; Carnival Man; Gems; The Day the Estate Stood Still	October 31, 1981
21	Around the World on Eighty Cents; Treasure Chest; No Substitute for a Watch Dog; Gems; Robot Robber	November 7, 1981

=== Season 3 – The Pac-Man/Little Rascals/Richie Rich Show ===
#	Title/Plot	Airdate
22	Born Flea; How Human	September 25, 1982
23	The Collector; Money Plant	September 25, 1982
24	The Midas Touch; Ball Room	October 2, 1982
25	Genie With the Light Brown Hair; Dignified Doggy	October 2, 1982
26	Coin Flipper; Mayda Munny	October 9, 1982
27	Busy Butler; The Haunting of Castle Rich: Richie, Dollar, and Gloria visit Castle Rich where they encounter the ghosts of Richie's descendants who were cursed to haunt their castle by one of the villages when they have been framed for the loss of the bank books by Cyrus Grudge. Now Richie and Gloria must find a way to break the curse by contending with Cyrus Grudge IV and his henchmen.	October 9, 1982
28	Shoe Biz; Sugar Bowl	October 16, 1982
29	Suavo; The Giant Ape Caper	October 16, 1982
30	Richie Goes to Shirik; The Pie-Eyed Piper	October 23, 1982
31	Guard Dog; Giant Pearl	October 23, 1982
32	The Youth Maker; Robot Bug Guards	October 30, 1982
33	I Say You All; Boy of the Year	October 30, 1982
34	Dollar's Exercise; Richie's Cube	November 6, 1982
35	The Maltese Monkey; Everybody's Doing It	November 6, 1982
36	Hard to Study; Gold Frame	November 13, 1982
37	Look Alike; Sky Hook	November 13, 1982

=== Season 4 – The Monchhichis/Little Rascals/Richie Rich Show ===
- Only Zillion-Dollar Adventures were produced for this season.

#	Title/Plot	Airdate
38	Richie Hood; The T.V. Phantom	September 17, 1983
39	A Whale of a Tale; Rich No More	September 24, 1983
40	The Ends of the Earth; The Snowman Cometh	October 1, 1983
41	The Irona Story; Mayda and the Monster	October 8, 1983
42	Video World	September 1, 1984

== Cast ==
The voice cast included:

- Sparky Marcus – Richie Rich
- Dick Beals – Reggie Van Dough
- Bill Callaway – Professor Keenbean, Chef Pierre
- Nancy Cartwright – Gloria Glad
- Joan Gerber – Mrs. Rich, Irona the Robot Maid
- Christian Hoff – Freckles, Pee Wee
- Stanley Jones – Mr. Rich, Cadbury the Butler
- Robert Ridgely - Collector
- Frank Welker – Dollar the Dog, Dr. Blemish, Suavo

== Home media ==
On May 20, 2008, Warner Home Video released The Richie Rich/Scooby-Doo Show: Volume 1 on DVD in Region 1.

DVD name	No. of episodes	Release date
The Richie Rich/Scooby-Doo Show: Volume 1	7	May 20, 2008; October 3, 2017 (re-release)
