= Shirt Tales =

Fictional characters

- Season 1 title card
- Genre: Fantasy; Comedy; Adventure
- Created by: Janet Elizabeth Manco (original characters)
- Directed by: George Gordon; Carl Urbano; Rudy Zamora; Bob Hathcock (season 1); Oscar Dufau (season 2); John Walker (season 2)
- Voices of: Nancy Cartwright; Robert Allan Ogle; Patricia Parris; Steve Schatzberg; Ronnie Schell; Fred Travalena; Herb Vigran; William Woodson
- Theme music composer: Hoyt Curtin
- Opening theme: "Shirt Tales"
- Ending theme: "Shirt Tales" (instrumental)
- Composer: Hoyt Curtin
- Country of origin: United States
- Original language: English
- No. of seasons: 2
- No. of episodes: 23 (46 segments)

Production
- Executive producers: William Hanna; Joseph Barbera
- Producers: Kay Wright; Iwao Takamoto (creative producer)
- Editor: Gil Iverson
- Running time: 22 minutes (11 minutes per segment)
- Production company: Hanna-Barbera Productions

Original release
- Network: NBC
- Release: September 18, 1982 – November 19, 1983

Shirt Tales are characters that were created in 1980 by greeting card designer Janet Elizabeth Manco and were featured on Hallmark Cards greeting cards. The characters were adapted into a 1982–83 animated series for television, by Hanna-Barbera Productions, which aired on NBC.

Shirt Tales are also featured on T-shirts, stuffed toys, and other merchandise in Japan since 1980.

== Cards ==
Hallmark Cards released the homonymous line of greeting cards with animal characters wearing T-shirts upon which was a message. Those cards were among Hallmark's best sellers at that time, which led the company to team with Hanna-Barbera Productions to adapt the Shirt Tales into a Saturday-morning cartoon, which premiered on NBC on September 18, 1982. The card line remained, but it faded shortly after the show left broadcast television in 1985.

== TV series ==
The animated Shirt Tales cartoon featured Tyg Tiger (in orange), Pammy Panda (in pink), Digger Mole (in light blue), Rick Raccoon (in red), and Bogey Orangutan (in green) (so-called because he spoke using a Humphrey Bogart-style voice). They lived in Oak Tree Park and wore shirts that flashed various brightly lit messages which reflected the characters' thoughts. They spent their time teasing the park custodian, Mr. Dinkel, and battling crime in and out of their hometown of Mid City. They zipped around the world in a vehicle known as the STSST (Shirt Tales' SuperSonic Transport) which could operate as a car, jet, boat, submarine, and other forms of transportation. Though most law enforcement agencies like the unnamed Commissioner knew of the Shirt Tales as crime fighters by reputation, few people seemed aware that they were talking animals, including Mr. Dinkel, whom the group often had to trick to keep their secret safe.

Each episode was divided into two 11–minute segments. After the success of the thirteen episodes in Season 1, ten episodes were created for Season 2, but the show was retooled and Kip Kangaroo (in light yellow) was added to the cast of characters without context for her joining the Shirt Tales. There is also a difference in leadership among the Shirt Tales, in which for the first season Rick appeared to be the de facto leader, but in the second season is instead Tyg. Several stories in Season 2 either omit Rick altogether or give him a minor role in the story. The second season also added some superhero elements to the dynamic of the group as well, most notably the color of all their T-shirts changing to a bright red color when "Shirt Tale Time" is called for.

Following the initial run on NBC, Shirt Tales aired on CBS during the 1984–1985 Saturday morning season, replacing The Biskitts in their time slot. CBS aired selected episodes from its two-season NBC run until March 23, 1985, when The Biskitts were returned to the time slot for the rest of the 1984–1985 season.

Shirt Tales was pulled from broadcast television on March 23, 1985, and the Hallmark franchise faded not long after as well. The show continued for a number of years as part of USA Network's Cartoon Express block and on Cartoon Network, but also continues to be broadcast in selected countries around the world on various networks, including Boomerang.

In Japan, Shirt Tales premiered and aired on TV Tokyo since early 1988.

== Voice cast ==
=== Main ===
- Nancy Cartwright – Kip Kangaroo (Season 2 only)
- Robert Allen Ogle – Digger Mole
- Patricia Parris – Pammy Panda
- Steve Schatzberg – Tyg Tiger, Rick Raccoon (Episode 4 only)
- Ronnie Schell – Rick Raccoon
- Fred Travalena – Bogey Orangutan
- Herb Vigran – Mr. Dinkel
- William Woodson – Commissioner (Season 1 only)

=== Additional voices ===
- Richard Balin (Season 1)
- Joe Besser (Season 1) – Elmo the Elephant (in "Elephant on the Loose")
- Joey Camen (Season 2) - Sparky the Dragon (in "Kip's Dragon")
- Victoria Carroll (Season 2)
- Brian Cummings
- Walker Edmiston (Season 1)
- Marshall Efron (Season 1)
- Bernard Erhard (Season 2)
- Ernest Harada (Season 2)
- Bob Holt (Season 2)
- Buster Jones (Season 2)
- Stanley Jones (Season 1)
- Sherry Lynn (Season 1)
- Tress MacNeille (Season 1) - Violette Skunk (in "Moving Time")
- Patty Maloney (Season 1) - Nancy (in "Moving Time")
- Sparky Marcus - Cubby Bear (in "Back to Nature")
- Kenneth Mars (Season 1)
- Joseph Medalis (Season 1)
- Don Messick (Season 1) - Buck Beaver
- Howard Morris (Season 2) – Shutter McBugg (in "Double Exposure")
- Henry Polic II (Season 1)
- Tony Pope
- Robert Ridgely (Season 1)
- Michael Rye (Season 1) – Mr. Gold (in "The Case of the Golden Armor")
- Marilyn Schreffler - T.J. Tiger (in "T.J.'s Visit")
- Rick Segall (Season 1)
- Michael Sheehan (Season 1) - Fillmore Fox (in "Moving Time")
- Hal Smith - Prairie Dog Pete (in "Moving Time")
- John Stephenson (Season 1) – Game Master (in "The Game Masters"), Museum Tour Guide (in "The Humboldt Ghost"), The Humboldt Ghost (in "The Humboldt Ghost"), Ebenezer Creepling (in "The Humboldt Ghost")
- Andre Stojka (Season 1)
- Jimmy Weldon (Season 2)
- Frank Welker (Season 1) – Figby the Cat (in "Figby, the Spoiled Brat Cat")
- Ted Zeigler (Season 1)

=== Japanese voice cast ===
- Minami Takayama – Rick Raccoon
- Mayumi Tanaka – Tyg Tiger
- Kae Araki – Pammy Panda
- Masako Nozawa – Bogey Orangutan
- Junko Hori – Digger Mole
- Toshiko Fujita – Kip Kangaroo
- Unshō Ishizuka – Mr. Dinkel
- Tōru Ōhira – Commissioner (Season 1 only)
- Chika Sakamoto – T.J. Tiger (in "T.J.'s Visit")

== Episodes ==
=== Season 1 (1982) ===
No. overall	No. in season	Title	Written by	Original release date
1	1	"The Case of the Golden Armor"	Bob Ogle	September 18, 1982
1	1	"Crumbling's Circus Caper"	Tom Dagenais	September 18, 1982
2	2	"The Game Masters"	Jim Ryan	September 25, 1982
2	2	"Shirt Napped"	Tom Dagenais	September 25, 1982
3	3	"The Big Foot Incident"	Bob Ogle	October 2, 1982
3	3	"Elephant on the Loose"	Tom Dagenais	October 2, 1982
4	4	"Horsin' Around"	Bob Ogle	October 9, 1982
4	4	"Mission Mutt"	Jim Ryan	October 9, 1982
5	5	"Vacation for Dinkel"	Jim Ryan	October 16, 1982
5	5	"Wingman"	Tedd Anasti	October 16, 1982
6	6	"The Humboldt Ghost"	Bob Ogle	October 23, 1982
6	6	"Figby, the Spoiled Brat Cat"	Hank Saroyan	October 23, 1982
7	7	"Digger Runs Away"	Tedd Anasti	October 30, 1982
7	7	"The Commissioner Is Missing"	Misty Stewart	October 30, 1982
8	8	"Raiders of the Lost Shark"	Jim Ryan	November 6, 1982
8	8	"The Terrible Termites"	Tedd Anasti	November 6, 1982
9	9	"Moving Time"	Tom Ruegger	November 13, 1982
9	9	"Back to Nature"	Gary Stamm	November 13, 1982
10	10	"Save the Park"	Tom Dagenais	November 20, 1982
10	10	"Pam-dora's Box"	William Hasley	November 20, 1982
11	11	"Hapless Hound"	John Graham	November 27, 1982
11	11	"The Very Buried Treasure"	Janis Diamond, Allan Heldfond	November 27, 1982
12	12	"Nearsighted Bear"	Janis Diamond, Allan Heldfond	December 4, 1982
12	12	"The Magical Musical Caper"	Jim Ryan	December 4, 1982
13	13	"Dinkel's Ark"	Tom Dagenais	December 11, 1982
13	13	"The Duke of Dinkel"	Tom Ruegger	December 11, 1982

=== Season 2 (1983) ===
No. overall	No. in season	Title	Written by	Original release date
14	1	"Bogey Goes Ape"	Glenn Leopold	September 17, 1983
14	1	"The Rain, the Park and the Robot"	Glenn Leopold, Cliff Roberts	September 17, 1983
15	2	"Digger's Three Wishes"	Bob Ogle	September 24, 1983
15	2	"Digger's Double"	Bob Ogle	September 24, 1983
16	3	"Kip's Dragon"	David Detiege	October 1, 1983
16	3	"Double Exposure"	Jim Ryan	October 1, 1983
17	4	"Taj Mahal Tyg"	Glenn Leopold, Cliff Roberts	October 8, 1983
17	4	"Brass Bogey"	Bob Ogle	October 8, 1983
18	5	"The Outer Space Connection"	Janis Diamond	October 15, 1983
18	5	"The Forbidden Island"	John Bates	October 15, 1983
19	6	"Saturday Night Shirt Tales"	Cynthia Friedlob, John Semper	October 22, 1983
19	6	"Dinkel's Buddy"	Alan Burnett, Jeff Segal	October 22, 1983
20	7	"Pleasure Valley"	Dan DiStefano	October 29, 1983
20	7	"The Ghost Out West"	David Detiege	October 29, 1983
21	8	"T.J.'s Visit"	David Detiege	November 5, 1983
21	8	"The Big Set-up"	Jim Ryan	November 5, 1983
22	9	"Kip's Toy Caper"	Cynthia Friedlob, Glenn Leopold, Cliff Roberts, John Semper	November 12, 1983
22	9	"Dinkel's Gift"	Alan Burnett, Jeff Segal	November 12, 1983
23	10	"Mayhem on the Orient Express"	Cynthia Friedlob, John Semper	November 19, 1983
23	10	"The Cuckoo Count Caper"	Cynthia Friedlob, John Semper	November 19, 1983

== Other media ==
Two musical book-and-record sets were released by K-tel International under the "Castle Rock" imprint: A Song Saves the Park, and Sunrise Surprise, but both sets use sound-alikes for the voices, and are presented differently from typical read-alongs.

== Home media ==
In 1986, a VHS release of the series was issued by Worldvision Home Video and Kids Klassics, and it contained the first full-length episode from Season 2 and the first segment of another episode from that season.

Warner Archive released Shirt Tales: The Complete Series on DVD in Region 1 as part of their Hanna-Barbera Classics Collection in September 2014.
