= The Pac-Man/Little Rascals/Richie Rich Show =

- Title card
- Directed by: George Gordon; Bill Hutten; Bob Hathcock; Ray Patterson; Carl Urbano; Rudy Zamora
- Theme music composer: Hoyt Curtin
- Country of origin: United States
- Original language: English
- No. of episodes: 18

Production
- Executive producers: William Hanna; Joseph Barbera
- Running time: 90 minutes
- Production companies: Hanna-Barbera Productions; King World Productions

Original release
- Network: ABC
- Release: September 25, 1982 – September 3, 1983

The Pac-Man/Little Rascals/Richie Rich Show is a 90-minute American Saturday morning animated package show co-produced by Hanna-Barbera Productions (which then owned the animation rights for Pac-Man and Richie Rich, now a part of Warner Bros. Discovery and NBCUniversal (under licensed for Richie Rich characters only via DreamWorks Animation's Classic Media and Harvey Entertainment)) and King World Productions (owner of the intellectual property of The Little Rascals, now subsumed into Paramount Global) and broadcast on ABC from September 25, 1982 to September 3, 1983.

The show contains episodes and content from three separate programs: Pac-Man, The Little Rascals and Richie Rich. It aired during the 1983–1984 season as The Little Rascals/Richie Rich Show.

== Segments ==
The 90-minute program was segmented as such:

- The Little Rascals - 11-minute first episode
- Richie Rich Riches - 7-minute first episode
- Richie Rich Gems - 30-second vignette
- Richie Rich Treasure Chest - 3-minute short
- The Little Rascals - 11-minute second episode
- The Little Rascals - 30-second vignette
- Richie Rich Zillion-Dollar Adventures - 11-minute second episode
- Pac-Man - 11-minute first episode
- Pac-Mania - 30-second vignette
- Pac-Man - 11-minute second episode
