= Rick Segall =

American film and television actor (born 1969)

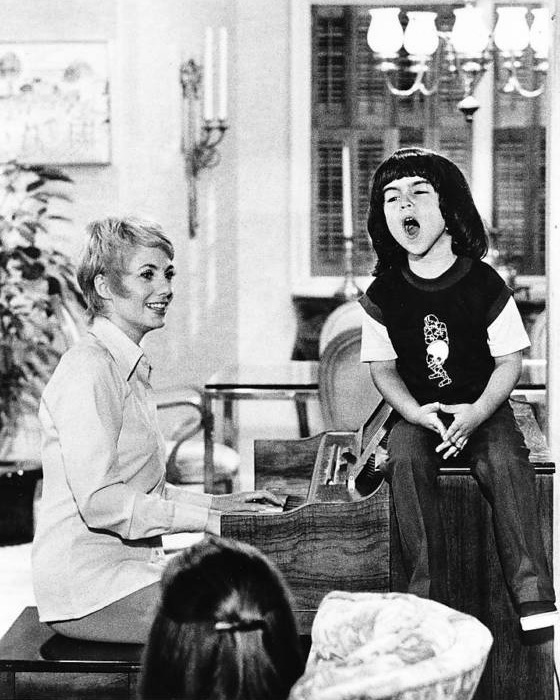
- Segall (right) with Shirley Jones in The Partridge Family, 1973
- Born: Richard Robert Segal III; March 10, 1969 (age 57); Plainview, New York, US
- Occupations: Film and television actor
- Years active: 1973–present

Richard Robert Segall III (born March 10, 1969) is an American film and television actor. He is best known for playing the singer Ricky Stevens in the American sitcom television series The Partridge Family.

== Life and career ==
Segall was born in Plainview, New York, the son of Rick and Barbara Segall. He and his family moved to Nashville, Tennessee in 1973. He began acting at the age of two. At the age of five, he acted in a Tonka toys television commercial. In 1973, he joined the cast of the ABC musical sitcom television series The Partridge Family, playing Ricky Stevens in its final season. He won the role of Stevens after being spotted by Paul Tannen, a music publisher, who mentioned him to executive producer Bob Claver. In the same year, he recorded an album titled Ricky Segall and the Segalls released by Bell Records.

In 1974, Segall was one of the hosts at the American Music Awards of 1974 along with Donny Osmond, Michael Jackson and Rodney Allen Rippy. He guest-starred and provided voices in television programs including Police Woman, Trollkins (voices), Shirt Tales (voices), Richie Rich (voices) and Little House on the Prairie. He also appeared in films such as The Last Married Couple in America and Oh, God! Book II, among others. He was an executive producer for the 2015 film Selected. His most recent credit was from the police procedural television series NCIS.
