= The Little Rascals (animated TV series) =

- Genre: Comedy
- Based on: Our Gang created by; Hal Roach
- Directed by: George Gordon; Bob Hathcock; Carl Urbano; Rudy Zamora
- Voices of: Julie McWhirter Dees; Patty Maloney; Scott Menville; Shavar Ross; B.J. Ward; Peter Cullen
- Composer: Hoyt Curtin
- Country of origin: United States
- Original language: English
- No. of seasons: 2
- No. of episodes: 22

Production
- Executive producers: William Hanna; Joseph Barbera
- Editor: Gil Iverson
- Camera setup: Single-camera
- Running time: 30 minutes (11 minutes a cartoon)
- Production companies: Hanna-Barbera Productions; King World Productions

Original release
- Network: ABC
- Release: September 25, 1982 – December 3, 1983

The Little Rascals is a 30-minute American Saturday morning animated series produced by Hanna-Barbera Productions and King World Productions. It first aired on ABC on September 25, 1982. A spin-off based on the live-action Our Gang comedy shorts, it was broadcast as part of The Pac-Man/Little Rascals/Richie Rich Show in 1982 and then as part of The Monchhichis/Little Rascals/Richie Rich Show in 1983.

The characters were designed by Iwao Takamoto and Bob Singer by using tracing paper on top of actual photographs of the real-life characters, and using a pencil to sketch the characters. The same technique was also used in previous Hanna-Barbera spin-offs such as The Fonz and the Happy Days Gang and Laverne and Shirley in the Army.

== Overview ==
=== Previous Little Rascals/Our Gang animated television programs ===
The Little Rascals had been animated for television twice before. In the 1960s, a series of nine clay-animated Little Rascals Color Specials were produced for syndication, presumably by Bura and Hardwick, the British studio responsible for Camberwick Green, using soundtracks from the original Our Gang films. The episodes include "Shiver My Timbers", "Our Gang Follies of 1936", "Second Childhood", "Hearts Are Thumps", "Came the Brawn", "Bear Shooters", "Readin' and Writin'", "The Pinch Singer", and "Teacher's Beau".

In 1979, Fred Wolf produced an animated The Little Rascals Christmas Special for NBC. That company's version was further used in animated public service announcements.

=== Differences between the animated series and the live-action Our Gang films ===
The animated series and the original live-action Our Gang films differ in a number of ways. The gang now lives in a contemporary 1980s setting, with computers and television. Buckwheat is now a clever inventor and is interested in science, always creating new devices for the gang, and Darla's eyes were changed from hazel to blue (although this detail was trivial given that all of the Our Gang shorts were in black-and-white). Also in the animated series, the Rascals met in a treehouse and drove around the town of Greenpoint in a dog-drawn vehicle. Also, the theme music was completely different. Furthermore, many characters such as Stymie don't appear.

== Lawsuit ==
In March 1984, Our Gang actor Eugene Lee, who had played Porky in the original theatrical short films as a child from 1935 to 1939, sued Hanna-Barbera Productions for nearly $2 million, claiming that the animated character was a violation of his likeness rights. He was joined in the lawsuit by other former Our Gang kids: George McFarland, who had played Spanky, Tommy Bond, who had played Butch, and Sidney Kibrick, who had played The Woim. Carl Switzer, Darla Hood and Billie Thomas, who had played Alfalfa, Darla and Buckwheat respectively were already deceased. It was found that Hanna-Barbera's license from King World did not include the likeness rights of the former child actors, and the case was settled out of court.

Following the lawsuit, ABC stopped airing reruns of the show, and the show would not be picked up for syndication anywhere, including Cartoon Network and Boomerang. This even prevented Warner Bros. Discovery from releasing the show on DVD as confirmed in 2016.

== Other languages ==
The French dub for Antenne 2, Les Petites Canailles, replaced the original theme music with a new theme song, performed by a chorus of children over a montage of clips from both the theatrical Our Gang shorts and the animated shorts.

== Episode titles ==
=== Season 1 (1982) ===
Aired as part of The Pac-Man/Little Rascals/Richie Rich Show.

#	Title/Plot	Airdate
1	Rascals' Revenge: Butch and Woim lure the Rascals into a supposedly haunted house.; Yachtsa Luck: The Rascals try to get Waldo's treasure back from a couple of robbers.; Fish Fright: 30 second vignette. Spanky and Alfalfa go fishing.	September 25, 1982
2	Grin and Bear It: During the Rascals' camping trip, Porky is abducted by the Phantom Lumberjack, who is apparently a bank robber in disguise.; Beauty Queen for a Day: After the boys fall for Dolly Van Dumpling, the new girl in town, Darla enters the Little Miss Big City Beauty Pageant.; The Serenade: 30 second vignette. Alfalfa serenades Darla, but his off-key singing scares Pete away.	October 2, 1982
3	Big City Rascals: The Rascals visit Darla's uncle on his farm.; Alfalfakazam!: During Spanky's magic show, Alfalfa supposedly turns into a rabbit.; Scoop Dupes: 30 second vignette.	October 9, 1982
4	Showdown at the Rascal Corral: Alfalfa plays cowboy; two outlaws "arrest" him for singing in a no-singing zone.; Poached Pooch: Butch and Woim steal Pete's dog license.; Ice Escapades: 30 second vignette. Despite a heat wave, Buckwheat, Spanky and Alfalfa are eager to go ice skating.	October 16, 1982
5	Porky-O and Julie-Et: Porky falls for the daughter of an ice cream magnate.; Just Deserts: The boys enter Darla's cake in a baking contest, but Darla is sick with the turkey pox and Alfalfa has to dress as a girl for the contest. The recipe card becomes illegible.; No Hit Wit: 30 second vignette.	October 23, 1982
6	Alfalfa for President: Alfalfa and Waldo compete for class president.; Rock and Roll Rascals: Darla wants an autograph from Greg Groover, a rock musician.; A Swimming We Will Go: 30 second vignette. Officer Ed finds the boys in a pond, in violation of a "no swimming" sign.	October 30, 1982
7	The Irate Pirates: On the beach, the Rascals hunt for treasure, then encounter two adult troublemakers dressed as pirates.; All the Loot That's Fit to Print: The Rascals start a newspaper, The Neighborhood Bugle; Alfalfa unwittingly spends counterfeit money.; The Spare: 30 second vignette.	November 6, 1982
8	Alfalfa's Athlete Feat: Butch challenges Alfalfa to a pentathlon.; Darla's Dream Dance: Darla organizes the school dance. The boys try to sabotage the event, after Alfalfa learns that Waldo is Darla's date.; Fiscal Fitness: 30 second vignette.	November 13, 1982
9	Cap'n Spanky's Showboat: The Rascals clean up the Mississippi Queen, an old steamboat.; Case of the Puzzled Pals: Alfalfa plays detective to find Darla's doll.; Go Cart Go: 30 second vignette. Butch takes Buckwheat's go cart for a spin.	November 20, 1982
10	Falling Heir: Spanky inherits a castle that is said to be haunted.; Flim Flam Film Fans: A movie director comes to town; Darla gets tied to a railroad gate á la Penelope Pitstop.; Do or Diet: 30 second vignette. Darla asks Buckwheat how many meals Porky eats in a day; the answer shocks her.	November 27, 1982
11	Trash Can Treasures: The Rascals find an Aladdin-type lamp. Darla adopts a stray horse.; King of the Hobos: After eating the other Rascals' food, Porky gets banned from the club, runs away and meets an old hobo.; Out on a Limb: 30 second vignette. Alfalfa is pushing Spanky in a swing, but is distracted by Darla.	December 4, 1982
12	Tiny Terror: Butch leaves his baby brother Spike with the Rascals.; Science Fair and Foul: Buckwheat builds a robot for a science fair.; Sea Song: 30 second vignette. While Spanky, Alfalfa, and Buckwheat are swimming, Alfalfa decides to sing "Oh My Darla", a parody of "Oh My Darling Clementine". Spanky and Buckwheat know how to keep him quiet.	December 11, 1982
13	Big Top Rascals: After being caught sneaking into the Ding-a-Ling Brothers circus, the Rascals decide to put on their own circus; Butch and Woim take unfair advantage of their free admission.; Class Act: The Rascals enter Pete in a dog show, but Waldo doesn't think Pete has a chance against the show's pedigree dogs. Things get hectic when somebody kidnaps Pete.; He Who Runs Away: 30 second vignette.	December 18, 1982

=== Season 2 (1983) ===
Aired as part of The Monchhichis/Little Rascals/Richie Rich Show

#	Title/Plot	Airdate
14	Wash and Werewolf: After seeing a 3-D horror movie, Alfalfa thinks he is a werewolf.	September 10, 1983
15	Save Our Treehouse!: A used car dealer wants to destroy the Rascals' treehouse. The Rascals protest his actions, like unionized workers on strike.	September 17, 1983
16	Horse Sense: Alfalfa and Waldo are fighting for Darla's affections again. This time, Waldo challenges Alfalfa to a horse race. There's just one problem: Alfalfa doesn't know how to ride.	September 24, 1983
17	After Hours: The Rascals get jobs in a department store warehouse.	October 1, 1983
18	A Not So Buenos Días: Alfalfa is suspicious of Darla's Latina friend, Maria.	October 15, 1983
19	Fright Night: The Rascals go trick-or-treating. Buckwheat dresses as George Washington Carver, and Darla dresses so as to resemble Alfalfa.	October 29, 1983
20	The Big Sneeze: The Rascals meet up with a goat, to which Alfalfa is allergic to.	November 12, 1983
21	Pete's Big Break: When Pete saves another dog from drowning, he and the Rascals are rewarded a chance to star in a dog food commercial.	November 19, 1983
22	The Zero Hero: Darla wins a date with Captain Muscles, a TV superhero, in order to impress Darla, Alfalfa assumes the identity of Alpha-Man.	December 3, 1983

"Tiny Terror", "Class Act", "Porky-O and Julie-Et" and "Cap'n Spanky's Showboat", previously aired during the first season, were rebroadcast on October 8 and 22, and November 5 and 26, 1983 respectively.

== Cast ==
=== Main voices ===
- Peter Cullen as Pete the Pup and Officer Ed
- Patty Maloney as Darla Hood
- Julie McWhirter as Alfalfa, Porky, and The Woim
- Scott Menville as Spanky
- Shavar Ross as Buckwheat
- B.J. Ward as Butch and Waldo

=== Additional voices ===
- Richard Balin
- Jered Barclay
- Julie Bennett
- Susan Blu
- Bill Callaway
- Brian Cummings
- Jeff Doucette
- Peggy Frees
- Phil Hartman
- Erv Immerman
- Kip King
- Earl Kress
- Sherry Lynn
- Larry D. Mann
- Kenneth Mars
- Joe Medalis
- Robert Ridgely
- Michael Sheehan
- Gary Stamm
- Jeffrey Tambor
- Russi Taylor
- Lennie Weinrib
- Jimmy Weldon
- Frank Welker
- Ted Zeigler
