= 1983–84 United States network television schedule (late night) =

These are the late night schedules on all three networks for each calendar season beginning September 1983. All times are Eastern/Pacific.

PBS is not included, as member television stations have local flexibility over most of their schedules and broadcast times for network shows may vary, CBS and ABC are not included on the weekend schedules (as the networks do not offer late night programs of any kind on weekends).

Talk/variety shows are highlighted in yellow, network news programs in gold, and local news & programs are highlighted in white background.

== Monday-Friday ==
-		11:00 PM	11:30 PM	12:00 AM	12:30 AM	1:00 AM	1:30 AM	2:00 AM	2:30 AM	3:00 AM	3:30 AM	4:00 AM	4:30 AM	5:00 AM	5:30 AM
ABC	Fall	local programming	ABC News Nightline		Local
ABC	Winter	local programming	ABC News Nightline	Eye on Hollywood	Local
ABC	Summer	local programming	ABC News Nightline	Eye on Hollywood (Mon.-Thur.) ABC Rocks (Fri.)	Local
CBS		local programming	The CBS Late Movie				local programming	CBS News Nightwatch
NBC	Fall	local programming	The Tonight Show Starring Johnny Carson		Late Night with David Letterman (Mon.-Thur.)/Friday Night Videos to 2:00 (Fri)		NBC News Overnight (Mon-Thur.,1:30-2:30/Fri.,2:00-3:00)		local programming
NBC	Winter	local programming	The Tonight Show Starring Johnny Carson		Late Night with David Letterman (Mon.-Thur.)/Friday Night Videos to 2:00 (Fri)		local programming

== Saturday ==
-	11:00 PM	11:30 PM	12:00 AM	12:30 AM	1:00 AM	1:30 AM	2:00 AM	2:30 AM	3:00 AM	3:30 AM	4:00 AM	4:30 AM	5:00 AM	5:30 AM
NBC	local programming	Saturday Night Live			local programming

== Sunday ==
-	11:00 PM	11:30 PM	12:00 AM	12:30 AM	1:00 AM	1:30 AM	2:00 AM	2:30 AM	3:00 AM	3:30 AM	4:00 AM	4:30 AM	5:00 AM	5:30 AM
NBC	local programming	NBC Late Night Movie				local programming

== By network ==
=== ABC ===
Returning Series

- Nightline

New Series

- ABC Rocks
- Eye on Hollywood

Not Returning From 1982-83

- One on One
- The Last Word

=== CBS ===
Returning Series

- The CBS Late Movie
- CBS News Nightwatch

=== NBC ===
Returning Series

- Friday Night Videos
- Late Night with David Letterman
- NBC Late Night Movie
- NBC News Overnight
- Saturday Night Live
- The Tonight Show Starring Johnny Carson

Not Returning From 1982-83

- SCTV Network 90
