= William Callaway =

American voice actor

- Other names: Bill Callaway; Bill Calloway
- Occupation: Voice actor
- Years active: 1967–1996

William Callaway is an American retired voice actor. He is also known as Bill Callaway and Bill Calloway. He is known for playing Aquaman in Super Friends.

== Filmography ==
=== Animated roles ===
- Aladdin - Zarasto
- Bonkers - Vic "Stiff Lips" Sullivan
- Captain Caveman and the Teen Angels - Additional voices
- Cattanooga Cats - Country
- Challenge of the GoBots - Additional voices
- Challenge of the Superfriends - Aquaman, Bizarro
- Darkwing Duck - Comet Guy
- Defenders of the Earth - Garax
- Drak Pack - Frankie, Howler
- Droopy, Master Detective - Rumpley
- DuckTales - Old Man Ribbit
- Fantastic Max - Additional voices (Season 2)
- Foofur - Burt
- Galtar and the Golden Lance - Additional Voices
- G.I. Joe - Beach Head
- Gomer Pyle: USMC - Dumbrowski
- Gunsmoke - Shuffles
- Help!... It's the Hair Bear Bunch! - Square Bear
- Inhumanoids - Dr. Herman Mangler/Nightcrawler, Jonathon Slattery/Liquidator
- Laverne & Shirley in the Army - Additional voices
- Lucky Luke - Lucky Luke
- Monchichis - Additional Voices
- My Smurfy Valentine - TV movie
- My Little Pony and Friends - Additional voices
- Pac-Man - Additional voices
- ProStars - Additional voices
- Quack Pack - Additional voices
- Richie Rich - Professor Keanbean
- Scooby-Doo and Scrappy-Doo - Additional voices
- Sealab 2020 - Sparks
- Super Friends - Aquaman
- Super Friends: The Legendary Super Powers Show - Additional voices
- Superman - Additional voices
- Spider-Man and His Amazing Friends - Angel
- The Dukes - Additional voices (Season 1)
- The Funtastic World of Hanna-Barbera - Professor Reggie von Goh
- The Incredible Hulk - Additional voices
- The Legend of Prince Valiant - Tor
- The Little Rascals - Additional voices
- The New Yogi Bear Show - Additional voices
- The Scooby & Scrappy-Doo/Puppy Hour - Additional voices
- The Smurfic Games (TV movie) - Clumsy Smurf, Painter Smurf, Dragon
- The Smurfs Christmas Special - TV special
- The Smurfs - Clumsy Smurf, Painter Smurf
- The Smurfs Springtime Special - Clumsy Smurf
- The Super Powers Team: Galactic Guardians - Aquaman
- The Voyages of Doctor Dolittle - Additional voices
- The World's Greatest Super Friends - Aquaman
- The Tom & Jerry Kids Show - Slowpoke Antonio
- Trollkins - Slug
- Wolf Rock TV - Additional voices

=== Film ===
- Cat Ballou - Loopy
- Daniel Boone - Young Daniel Boone, Running Fox
- G.I. Joe: Arise, Serpentor Arise - Beachhead
- G.I. Joe: The Movie - Beachhead
- Hank the Cowdog - Various Characters
- Hanna-Barbera's All-Star Comedy Ice Revue - Square Bear
- Here Are the Smurfs (TV movie) - Clumsy Smurf
- Scooby-Doo Meets the Boo Brothers - Ape, Beauregard's Ghost, Billy Bob Scroggins, Ghost in the Attic, Headless Horseman
- Tis The Season to Be Smurfy (TV special) - Clumsy Smurf, Rich Man
- Ultraman: The Adventure Begins - Additional voices
- Yogi's Great Escape - Dad, Trapper
