= Monchhichi =

Line of Japanese stuffed animal toys

- A Monchhichi doll
- Company: Sekiguchi Corporation
- Country: Japan
- Availability: 1974–present
- Official website

Monchhichi (モンチッチ, Monchitchi) is a line of Japanese stuffed toys from the Sekiguchi Corporation. First released in 1974, they depict a baby monkey (which is usually brown) with a pacifier in its left hand to suck on using the hole in its mouth. They were licensed by Mattel in the United States until 1985, and later distributed worldwide directly by Sekiguchi.

Five television series were produced based on the characters: the Japanese anime series Monchhichi Twins (ふたごのモンチッチ, Futago no Monchhichi) in 1980, produced by Tokyo 12 Channel (now TV Tokyo); the American cartoon series Monchhichis in 1983, produced by Hanna-Barbera Productions; the French cartoon series Kiki, le Kiki de tous les Kiki in 2001, produced by Ben-J Productions; the Japanese stop-motion series Monchhichi (モンチッチ, Monchhichi) in 2005, by Kids Station; and the French CGI series Monchhichi Tribe (La Tribu Monchhichi) in 2017, produced by Technicolor Animation Productions.

== History ==
The Monchhichi franchise is held by the Sekiguchi Corporation, a famous doll company, located in Tokyo, Japan. Monchhichi was created by Yoshiharu Washino and released on 25 January 1974, developed from an earlier toy, the Kuta Kuta Monkey (くたくたモンキー). Sekiguchi claims they created these characters in order to inspire respect and love in the young (Japanese) children and adults. Their name is derived from the words "Mon" which translates to "Mine" in French, and "Chichi" which closely resembles the sound a child's pacifier would produce according to Japanese phonetics. The resulting word also has a similar sound to the word "Monkey" in English.

The dolls were successful in Japan, and the 1980 animated TV series Futago no Monchhichi (ふたごのモンチッチ, Monchhichi Twins) helped increase its popularity even further.

Export of the doll line started in 1975 to Germany and Austria. The following years would see the Monchhichi line marketed in more countries. The original name was officially changed to "Chicaboo" in the United Kingdom, to "Mon Cicci" in Italy, to "Kiki" in France, and to "Bølle" in Denmark. Additionally, non-officially licensed by Sekiguchi clones popped up in several countries, like "Moncsicsi" in Hungary and "Virkiki" in Spain. The height of the Monchhichi dolls' popularity was in Germany during the 1980s, surpassing even the Japanese figure sales during this period.

The Monchhichi doll line reached North American shores in 1980. Mattel bought the license for the toyline. The American cartoon series Monchhichis was produced by Hanna-Barbera in 1983 and aired on ABC (as part of The Monchhichis/Little Rascals/Richie Rich Show) in an effort to promote the doll line. The line was dropped by Mattel due to poor sales in 1985, but was reintroduced during Monchhichi's 30 anniversary in 2004 by Sekiguchi. As of 2025, Monchhichi dolls are still available in the United States from retailers such as Urban Outfitters. In 2013 Sekiguchi decided to distribute Monchhichi worldwide directly, stopped the licensing and use of the different names in foreign markets, and unified the brand under the name Monchhichi officially in all the distribution markets.

As of 2025, Monchhichi are still popular in Europe, mostly as a nostalgic toy or for collectors. Many variants and sizes of Monchhichi have emerged. For example, the original Monchhichi is still available under the Classic variants in 10 cm, 20 cm, 24 cm, 45 cm, and 80 cm sizes. Other variants like Boutique (Monchhichi in various dress styles), Mother Care (Monchhichi with a young one in her front pocket), and Anniversary editions are available. Dollhouses for Monchhichi also exist. The Mall Group, a retail company in Thailand, collaborated with the doll brand during Christmas 2025.

== 1980 anime series ==
- Monchhichi

モンチッチ (Monchitchi)
- Genre: Family
- Anime television series

Monchhichi Twins
- Directed by: Hiroshi Jinsenji
- Studio: Ashi Productions; Kokusai Eiga-sha
- Original network: Tokyo Channel 12
- Original run: February 4, 1980 – August 1, 1980
- Episodes: 130 segments

Monchhichi (モンチッチ, Futago no Monchitchi; Indonesian language: Si Kembar Monchihi) is a Japanese animated series which first aired in 1980.

Japanese voice cast

- Monchhichi–kun – Fuyumi Shiraishi
- Monchicchi-chan – Keiko Han
- Keiko Han
- Fei Fei Liu
- Sanji Hase

== American animated television series ==
The American Monchhichi cartoon aired on ABC in the 1983–1984 season.
