= The Biskitts =

American animated television series

- Genre: Adventure; Fantasy; Comedy
- Created by: William Hanna; Joseph Barbera
- Written by: Duane Poole; Tom Swale
- Directed by: Oscar Dufau; George Gordon; Carl Urbano; John Walker; Rudy Zamora
- Voices of: Dick Beals; Peter Cullen; Jennifer Darling; Marshall Efron; Henry Gibson; Kathleen Helppie; Darryl Hickman; Bob Holt; Jerry Houser; Kip King; Kenneth Mars; B. J. Ward
- Composer: Hoyt Curtin
- Country of origin: United States
- Original language: English
- No. of episodes: 13 (26 segments)

Production
- Executive producers: William Hanna; Joseph Barbera
- Producers: Art Scott; Iwao Takamoto (creative producer)
- Editor: Gil Iverson
- Running time: 20 minutes (10 minutes per segment)
- Production company: Hanna-Barbera Productions

Original release
- Network: CBS
- Release: September 17 – December 10, 1983

The Biskitts is an American animated series produced by Hanna-Barbera Productions from 1983 to 1984 and aired on CBS. The series lasted for only one season; only 13 episodes were produced. Shirt Tales replaced the show in its time slot the following year. The Biskitts returned to that same time slot in March 1985 but only aired reruns in the remainder of that season. Following the series' retirement from CBS, like many other cartoons, it was acquired by the Armed Forces Network and shown throughout much of the 1980s, mainly as entertainment for children of deployed American servicemen in Asia and Europe.

== Plot ==
The Biskitts are a group of tiny anthropomorphic dogs who live on Biskitt Island and are committed to guarding the crown jewels of Biskitt Castle. Modeled after Robin Hood, the Biskitts still serve their recently deceased king while performing good deeds for the underprivileged inhabitants of their tiny island. It is explained in the opening narration that, due to their good reputation for responsibility and security, other kings have entrusted their treasures to be safeguarded by the Biskitts.

The villain of the series is the king's mean-spirited, wasteful younger brother, King Max, who rules the neighboring Lower Suburbia. In lieu of a proper coronation, Max constantly schemes to steal the royal treasure with the help of his hench-hounds, Fang and Snarl, and his jester, Shecky. The Biskitts are also in danger of being captured and eaten by a large wildcat named Scratch.

== Characters ==
=== Biskitts ===
- Waggs (voiced by Darryl Hickman) is the protagonist of the series who leads the Biskitts on every mission and is always there if his friends are in trouble. He is Sweets' boyfriend.
- Sweets (voiced by Kathleen Helppie-Shipley, credited as Kathleen Helppie) is a kind and gentle Biskitt that is friendly to other animals, as well as the Biskitts, and very helpful. She is Waggs' girlfriend.
- Shiner (voiced by Jerry Houser) is a very lazy and selfish Biskitt who is jealous of Waggs' leadership. Sometimes, when the Biskitts fall into a trap, Shiner blames Waggs for nothing. He makes Downer do all his work, but he does have a hidden kindly side.
- Lady (voiced by B. J. Ward) is the posh Biskitt who likes to stay clean and pretty. Lady also likes decorating the castle.
- Bump (voiced by Bob Holt) is a strong Biskitt who is a bit dim and clumsy, but is also helpful and friendly with Scat. In one episode, Bump finds Shecky's jokes funny and becomes friends with him.
- Downer (voiced by Henry Gibson) is an unhappy and cowardly Biskitt, pessimistic that something bad will happen. He is the unlikely friend of Shiner, who makes him do the latter's work while Shiner lays about.
- Wiggle (voiced by Jennifer Darling) is another girl Biskitt who helps out with events. She likes Shiner, but in one episode, she has a crush on Waggs.
- Spinner (voiced by Bob Holt) is the oldest and wisest Biskitt. He helps the Biskitts when they stumble into something he knows about; in fact, Spinner knows a lot about the swamp.
- Scat (voiced by Dick Beals) is a young Biskitt. He is industrious and brave, but sometimes, his bravery can land him into trouble. Scat is friends with Bump, who saves him sometimes from trouble.
- Mooch (voiced by Marshall Efron) is the fat and gluttonous Biskitt who always thinks about food.

==== Minor Biskitts ====
- Rover (voiced by Peter Cullen) is a pirate-like Biskitt who has been away from Biskitt island for a long time.
- Flip (voiced by Bob Holt) is a laid-back Biskitt.
- Fetch (voiced by Kenneth Mars) is a silly-looking Biskitt.
- Princess Biskitt gets kidnapped by King Max to capture the Biskitts. The male Biskitts fall into the trap and are about to be boiled alive with her. Sweets, Wiggle and Lady think she is not real at first, but find out that she is and save the male Biskitts and Princess Biskitt from their hot watery doom.

=== Villains ===
- King Max (voiced by Kenneth Mars) is an evil, mean-spirited and wasteful King who rules the neighboring Lower Suburbia and serves as the antagonist. He is the younger brother of the previous King. It is never explained why Max is not crowned as the new ruler of the Biskitts, but it is possible that his brother barred him from succeeding him, due to his evil nature. He tries hard to go to Biskitts Castle to steal the royal treasure. King Max bosses Shecky around the castle most of the time and threatens the Biskitts to talk, sometimes by trying to kill them, using methods that range from an eagle who does not like Biskitts attacking them to boiling them alive. Despite being the King, Max wears tatty, ripped clothes with the toe part of his left shoe missing.
  - Shecky (voiced by Kip King) is King Max' sidekick and court jester, but is rather dimwitted and not always loyal to Max; he even makes friends with Bump, who shares his love of practical jokes. He is not just a jester, but also cleans, cooks, and does other jobs for King Max.
  - Fang and Snarl (vocal effects provided by Peter Cullen and Kenneth Mars) are King Max' hounds. They help Max and Shecky in sniffing the Biskitts out.
  - Moat Monster (vocal effects provided by Frank Welker) is a serpentine monster that lives in the moat surrounding King Max' castle.
- Scratch (voiced by Peter Cullen) is a wildcat who is always trying to catch the Biskitts and eat them. He lives in a cave somewhere in the swamp. When the Biskitts are near Scratch's cave, they need to be on the lookout for him. He has a cousin named Itch, who causes the Biskitts confusion.

=== Other characters ===
- The Whiskers are a group of cats who only appear in the episode "Raiders of The Lost Bark".
  - Mouser is the leader of the Whiskers. He befriends Sweets and shows her his home, Whisker Tree.
  - Pendora is a female cat who has a crystal ball and uses it to see what is going on. Sweets notes that this is similar to the extensive knowledge in Spinner's book.
  - Boots is a fat lazy cat who always sleeps so he could go to bed at night.
  - Scaredy Cat is a cat who is afraid of everything.
  - Mink is a pretty French-accented cat who has a crush on Scat after he saves her from Scratch. She seems to be a feline version of Lady.
  - Jinks is a cat with constant bad luck.
  - Tiger is a tough cat with an eye patch, he seems to be the Whiskers' equivalent of Bump.
- Talon the Rat is a large rat who tries to eat the Whiskers, just like how Scratch hunts the Biskitts. When they crossed each other's paths, Talon is scared of Scratch and ran away, causing Scratch to chase him, thus ensuring that both of them are not seen for a while.
- Itch (voiced by Frank Welker) is the cousin of Scratch who causes the Biskitts confusion. He only appears in "Belling the Wild Cat".
- King Otto is a king who arrives with his army of knights to steal King Max' treasure. He only appeared in "King Max's War".
- The Witch tries to kidnap Sweets and Waggs and feed them to her mirror, but Spinner knows a lot about her and stops just in time, resulting in her castle getting destroyed along with her. She has a pet bat and a pet rat.
- Pyronce is a dragon who menaces the Biskitts until he is defeated.

== Cast ==
- Dick Beals - Scat
- Peter Cullen - Dog Foot, Fang, Scratch, Rover
- Jennifer Darling - Wiggle
- Marshall Efron - Mooch
- Henry Gibson - Downer
- Kathleen Helppie-Shipley - Sweets
- Darryl Hickman - Waggs
- Bob Holt - Bump, Flip, Spinner
- Jerry Houser - Shiner
- Kip King - Shecky
- Kenneth Mars - Fetch, King Max, Snarl
- B. J. Ward - Lady
- Frank Welker - Itch, Moat Monster (uncredited)

== Episodes ==
No.	Title	Written by	Original release date
1	"As the Worm Turns"	Len Janson, Chuck Menville and Gene Ayres	September 17, 1983
1	"Trouble in the Tunnel"	Duane Poole and Tom Swale	September 17, 1983
As the Worm Turns: Sweets befriends a worm. Trouble in the Tunnel: Shiner gives Scat a job for cleaning treasure and a mole comes on Biskitt Island. The ring gets stuck on the mole's nose, causing Scat to follow the mole. Scat must save the day and stop King Max.
2	"The Moonpond"	Michael Reaves	September 24, 1983
2	"Fly Me to the Goon"	David Wise	September 24, 1983
The Moonpond: Shiner want to be brave and legendary like The Moonpond, so he decides to battle Scratch. This results in the Biskitts helping him. Fly Me to the Goon: Bump lands on King Max's castle. Waggs, Sweets, Scat and Shiner must save him.
3	"Dogfoot"	Michael Reaves	October 1, 1983
3	"Up to His Old Tricks"	Duane Poole and Tom Swale	October 1, 1983
Dogfoot: Downer is sick and Biskitts meets Dogfoot. Up to His Old Tricks: King Max is using the Trick Book and he finally gets treasure, but Sweets and Downer are in the treasure box. Wags and the other Biskitts must get the treasure back and save Sweets and Downer.
4	"Spinner's Surprise"	Michael Reaves and Marc Scott Zicree	October 8, 1983
4	"Two Leagues Under the Pond"	Dan DiStefano	October 8, 1983
Spinner's Surprise: It is Spinner's birthday. Two Leagues Under the Pond: King Max and Shecky use a submarine in the shape of a crocodile to get King John's treasure on Biskitts Island.
5	"Turnaround Hound"	Diane Duane	October 15, 1983
5	"A Dark and Stormy Knight"	Michael Reaves and Marc Scott Zicree	October 15, 1983
Turnaround Hound: Snarl gets hurt and Biskitts take care of him. Shiner helps him to recover. A Dark and Stormy Knight: A Black Knight appears and he wants the Biskitts treasure as he kidnaps Scat. The Biskitts and King Max have to work together to thwart the Black Knight.
6	"Belling the Wild Cat"	Michael Reaves	October 22, 1983
6	"King Max's War"	Michael Reaves	October 22, 1983
Belling the Wild Cat: The Biskitts plot to bell Scratch to keep him from sneaking up on them. Meanwhile, Scratch is visited by his cousin Itch. King Max's War: King Otto and his knights arrive in Biskitt Swamp in order to claim King Max's treasure even though he does not have any. To keep their swamp from being burned down, the Biskitts end up arranging a duel between King Max and King Otto while befriending King Otto's daughter.
7	"Moving Day"	Jeff Segal and Alan Burnett	October 29, 1983
7	"A Biskitt Halloween"	Michael Reaves	October 29, 1983
Moving Day: Using the rainy weather to their advantage, King Max and Shecky search for the Biskitts and do a sneak attack on them. A Biskitt Halloween: On Halloween, a witch that the Biskitts have outsmarted years ago returns to obtain two Biskitts in order to stay in Biskitt Swamp. Her spell ends up draining the life out of the swamp which also turns Scratch, King Max, and Shecky to stone. The witch then kidnaps Waggs and Sweets. The other Biskitts must save them before the witch's spell is complete.
8	"Around the Swamp in a Daze"	Marc Scott Zicree and Donald F. Glut	November 5, 1983
8	"Rogue Biskitt"	Michael Reaves and Marc Scott Zicree	November 5, 1983
Around the Swamp in a Daze: King Max and Shecky use a balloon to find the Biskitts' Island. Rogue Biskitt: A Biskitt named Rover arrives on Biskitt Island, while Scat wants to join him on his journey.
9	"The Golden Biskitt"	Michael Reaves	November 12, 1983
9	"The Bone in the Stone"	Michael Reaves	November 12, 1983
The Golden Biskitt: Lady is turned into gold by a wizard's apprentice. The Bone in the Stone: When Waggs' leg is hurt, Sweets takes over as leader for the other Biskitts and tries to get the treasure back from the dragon.
10	"The Trojan Biskitt"	Michael Reaves	November 19, 1983
10	"Snatched from Scratch"	Gene Ayres	November 19, 1983
The Trojan Biskitt: King Max plots to give the Biskitts a statue of the Biskitts so he can get their treasures. Snatched from Scratch: Shiner gets kidnapped by both Scratch and King Max, forcing the Biskitts to save their selfish friend.
11	"The Biskitt Who Cried Woof"	Michael Reaves and Marc Scott Zicree	November 26, 1983
11	"Shecky's Last Laugh"	Michael Reaves	November 26, 1983
The Biskitt Who Cried Woof: Wiggle tries to impress Waggs (who has a crush on him), but when King Max uses an eagle to capture the Biskitts, Wiggle goes to save them. Shecky's Last Laugh: Bump befriends Shecky.
12	"Raiders of the Lost Bark"	Michael Reaves	December 3, 1983
12	"The Princess and the Plea"	Dianne Dixon	December 3, 1983
Raiders of the Lost Bark: Sweets meets the Whiskers, a group of cats. The Princess and the Plea: Princess Biskitt is kidnapped by King Max. Waggs, Bump, Shiner, Scat, Mooch and Downer go out to save her. Sweets, Wiggle and Lady must show the boys that the girls are better.
13	"The Swamp Monster"	David Gerrold	December 10, 1983
13	"May the Best Biskitt Win"	Cynthia Friedlob and John Semper	December 10, 1983
The Swamp Monster: Scat tries to be brave. May the Best Biskitt Win: Shiner challenges Waggs for the leadership of the Biskitts with a Vote.

== Music ==
Franz Liszt's Hungarian Rhapsody No. 2 is used in theme and in parts in some of episodes. William Hanna and Joseph Barbera used the tune in their 1946 Academy Award winning Tom and Jerry cartoon The Cat Concerto.

== Children's book ==
A children's book was created based on The Biskitts. In the book, it is discovered that King Max's jester Shecky bears a striking resemblance to King John, one of the kings who has entrusted his treasure to be safeguarded by the Biskitts. When King Max learns of this, he plots to use it to his advantage telling Shecky that they will attempt to steal King John's treasure by having Shecky impersonate King John to come and withdraw his treasure, and Max will pretend to be his slave. While Max and Shecky fool the Biskitts at first into thinking the real King John has come, Shecky seems to enjoy goofing off more and allowing Max to have to do all sorts of chores, much as King Max made him do plenty of demeaning labor.

== White Castle promotion ==
White Castle Castle Meals featured different Biskitts-related games that could be assembled out of their boxes, such as being tossed into King Max's mouth.

== Home media ==
The first episode of the show, as part of the DVD collection, Saturday Mornings Cartoons: 1980s, was released on May 4, 2010.

Warner Archive released The Biskitts – The Complete Series on DVD in region 1 as part of their Hanna-Barbera Classic Collection in February 2018.
