= Pac-Man (TV series) =

TV series

- Genre: Adventure; Comedy; Slapstick; Slice-of-life
- Based on: Pac-Man by Toru Iwatani
- Developed by: Jeffrey Scott
- Written by: Jeffrey Scott
- Directed by: George Gordon; Carl Urbano; Rudy Zamora; Bob Hathcock (season 1); Bill Hutten (season 1); Oscar Dufau (season 2); John Walker (season 2); Ray Patterson (Christmas special)
- Voices of: Marty Ingels; Peter Cullen; Barry Gordon; Darryl Hickman; Allan Lurie; Chuck McCann; Barbara Minkus; Lorenzo Music; Neil Ross; Susan Silo; Russi Taylor; Frank Welker
- Opening theme: "Pac-Man"
- Ending theme: "Pac-Man" (instrumental)
- Composer: Hoyt Curtin
- Country of origin: United States
- Original language: English
- No. of seasons: 2
- No. of episodes: 44

Production
- Executive producers: William Hanna; Joseph Barbera
- Producers: Kay Wright; Iwao Takamoto (creative producer)
- Editor: Gil Iverson
- Running time: 30 minutes
- Production company: Hanna-Barbera Productions

Original release
- Network: ABC
- Release: September 25, 1982 – November 5, 1983

Related
- Pac-Man and the Ghostly Adventures

Pac-Man is an American animated television series produced by Hanna-Barbera Productions and based on the Namco video game franchise of the same title. It premiered on ABC and ran for 44 episodes over two seasons from September 25, 1982, to November 5, 1983. It was the first animated series adaptation of a video game, as well as the first ever animated series made using digital-ink-and-paint.

It was the highest-rated Saturday morning cartoon show in the US during late 1982. Upon its debut, it was watched by an audience of over 20 million children in the US, in addition to adults. The show also inspired the 1984 arcade game Pac-Land.

== Plot ==
The show follows the adventures of the title character, Pac-Man, his wife Pepper Pac-Man (Ms. Pac-Man), their child Pac-Baby, their dog Chomp-Chomp, and their cat Sour Puss. The family lives in Pac-Land, a place in which the geography and architecture seem to revolve primarily around sphere-like shapes. Most episodes of the series center around the ongoing battle between the Pac family and their only known enemies, the Ghost Monsters: Blinky, Pinky, Inky, Clyde, and Sue. They work for Mezmaron, whose sole mission is to locate and control the source of "Power Pellets", which serve as the primary food and power source for the city, and also is the deus ex machina in virtually every episode that can be used against Mezmaron and the Ghost Monsters.

The second (and final) season later introduces Super-Pac and Pac-Man's teenage cousin P.J.

== Production ==
During his time working as a theatrical agent, Marty Ingels was handling calls on behalf of his client Robert Culp. After briefly being disconnected, Ingels' attempts to re-establish contact connected him by accident to Hanna-Barbera executive Gordon Hunt who exclaimed "We got the rights to Pac-Man!" In response, Ingels was left confused as to what Pac-Man was, initially thinking it was a luggage company. After going into his pitch for Culp, Hunt interrupted Ingels to compliment him on his New York accented voice, which led to Hunt offering Ingels the voice of Pac-Man after sampling approximately 173,000 other voices.

== Influence ==
The show's initial success inspired ABC's rival CBS to work with Ruby-Spears to develop Saturday Supercade, which featured other video game characters from the golden age of video arcade games.

Some of the next Namco games were based on or influenced by the cartoon. Pac-Land and Pac-Man 2: The New Adventures are major examples. The Tengen release of the original Pac-Man arcade game for the Nintendo Entertainment System features box art based on the cartoon.

The show is also seen as setting the stage for other animated series of the 1980s that would adapt not only video games, but other franchises including toys.

== Controversy ==
As the first season aired, scenes of Pac-Man "chomping" the Ghost Monsters and being "chomped" himself were considered too "violent". These scenes were toned down in subsequent episodes to provide less direct scenes of the characters "chomping" one another.

== Episodes ==
=== Season 1 (1982) ===
Aired as part of The Pac-Man/Little Rascals/Richie Rich Show.

No.	Title	Original release date
1	"Presidential Pac-Nappers"	September 25, 1982
Mezmaron orders the Ghost Monsters to kidnap the Pac-President in order to get Pac-Man to lead them to the Power Pellet Forest.
2	"Picnic in Pacland"	September 25, 1982
Pac-Man and his family go for a picnic. The Ghost Monsters are also on a picnic and plot to chomp Pac-Man.
3	"The Great Pac-Quake"	October 2, 1982
The Ghost Monsters get an earthquake-making machine from Mezmaron.
4	"Hocus-Pocus Pac-Man"	October 2, 1982
Pac-Man puts Pac-Baby in a magic hat and makes him disappear.
5	"Southpaw Packy"	October 9, 1982
When the Ghost Monsters ruin the Pac-Land World Series, Pac-Man challenges them to a baseball game to decide who leaves town.
6	"Pac-Baby Panic"	October 9, 1982
The Ghost Monsters steal a sack of Power Pellets, accidentally kidnapping Pac-Baby.
7	"Pacula"	October 16, 1982
Mezmaron transforms a vampire bat into the vampire Count Pacula in a plot to get the citizens of Pac-Land to hand over the map to the Power Pellet Forest.
8	"Trick or Chomp"	October 16, 1982
The Pac-Family goes trick or treating on Halloween night until the Ghost Monsters come along and complicate matters.
9	"Super Ghosts"	October 23, 1982
The Ghost Monsters get superpowers and try to take over the world.
10	"The Pac-Man in the Moon"	October 23, 1982
After the Ghost Monsters steal the Space Shuttle, Pac-Man and Pepper must retrieve it.
11	"Journey to the Center of Pacland"	October 30, 1982
Mezmaron and the Ghost Monsters try to tunnel into the Power Pellet Forest.
12	"Invasion of the Pac-Pups"	October 30, 1982
A litter of Pac-Pups come to the Pac-Family's house, and Pac-Man tries to get rid of them.
13	"Sir Chomp-A-Lot"	November 6, 1982
Mezmaron sends the Ghost Monsters 50 years back into the past, but Inky's goofiness causes them to meet Pac-Man's ancestor Sir Chomp-A-Lot.
14	"The Day the Forest Disappeared"	November 6, 1982
When Mezmaron successfully steals the Power Pellet Forest, it is up to Pac-Man to get it back.
15	"Neander-Pac-Man"	November 13, 1982
Pac-Man reads Pac-Baby a story about their prehistoric ancestor and his discovery of Power Pellets.
16	"Backpackin' Packy"	November 13, 1982
Pac-Man is permitted to lead the Pac-Baby Scouts after their original leader stubs his toe.
17	"The Abominable Pac-Man"	November 20, 1982
Pac-Man and Pepper are racing to beat Mezmaron and the Ghost Monsters to an area where Power Pellets are located, while a legendary monster lurks in the hills.
18	"The Bionic Pac-Woman"	November 20, 1982
Mezmaron makes a robotic clone of Pepper to fool Pac-Man.
19	"Chomp-Out at the O.K. Corral"	November 27, 1982
The Ghost Monsters and their bratty cousin, Dinky, run into the Pac-Family while both are vacationing out West.
20	"Once Upon a Chomp"	November 27, 1982
The Ghost Monsters' Fairy Ghost Monster comes and gives them a magic book of fairy tales to trap Pac-Man and Pepper.
21	"The Pac-Love-Boat"	December 4, 1982
Pac-Man and Pepper take an anniversary cruise on the Love Boat while the Ghost Monsters try to ruin their trip.
22	"The Great Power-Pellet Robbery"	December 4, 1982
Mezmaron gives the Ghost Monsters a truck in order to retrieve the Power Pellets from the Power Pellet Forest.
23	"A Bad Case of the Chomps"	December 11, 1982
Pac-Man is rushed to the hospital, believing he has chompitis after chomping the Ghost Monsters.
24	"Goo-Goo at the Zoo"	December 11, 1982
The Pac-Family goes to the zoo, but Pac-Baby frees all the animals.
25	"Nighty Nightmares"	December 18, 1982
A failed attempt by the Ghost Monsters to zap Pac-Man with a nightmare-inducing ray causes them to have nightmares about getting chomped by him and the other residents of Pac-Land.
26	"The Pac-Mummy"	December 18, 1982
Mezmaron discovers a mummy and uses it to kidnap Pepper and Pac-Baby.

=== Season 2 (1983) ===
Aired as part of The Pac-Man/Rubik, the Amazing Cube Hour.

No.	Title	Original release date
27	"Here's Super-Pac"	September 17, 1983
Mezmaron creates a giant robotic Ghost Monster to battle Super-Pac.
28	"Hey, Hey, Hey... It's P.J."	September 17, 1983
Pac-Man must convince his cousin P.J. to stay in school.
29	"The Super-Pac-Bowl"	September 24, 1983
After the Ghost Monsters chomp the football team, Pac-Man, Super-Pac, and their team must face off against them.
30	"Journey Into the Pac-Past"	September 24, 1983
P.J. fixes Ms. Pac's washing machine, accidentally turning it into a time machine.
31	"The Old Pac-Man and the Sea"	October 1, 1983
The Ghost Monsters sink a ship full of Power Pellets with Pac-Man on board, trapping them all in Paclantis at the mercy of the tyrannical Pac-Queen.
32	"Public Pac-Enemy No. 1"	October 1, 1983
Pac-Man is mistaken for the criminal Pretty Boy Pac and sent to prison.
33	"The Genii [sic] of Pacdad"	October 8, 1983
Pac-Man and Super-Pac square off against the Ghost Monsters for ownership of a genie's bottle.
34	"Computer Packy"	October 8, 1983
P.J. tinkers with Pac-Man's computer, causing it to pull Pac-Baby inside similar to the film Tron.
35	"The Greatest Show in Pacland"	October 15, 1983
The Ghost Monsters celebrate Dinky's birthday at the same circus where the Pac-Family is celebrating Pac-Baby's birthday.
36	"Pac-A-Thon" "Pac-A-Lympics"	October 15, 1983
Legal technicalities permit the Ghost Monsters to participate in the Olympics, and it is up to the Pac-Family to try to defeat them in various athletic events.
37	"Dr. Jekyll and Mr. Pac-Man"	October 22, 1983
Pac-Man turns into a werewolf after the Ghost Monsters trick him into eating Power Pellets specially created by Mezmaron.
38	"Around the World in 80 Chomps"	October 22, 1983
Pac-Man must stop Mezmaron and the Ghost Monsters from finding their own Power Pellet Forest abroad.
39	"Super-Pac vs. Pac-Ape"	October 29, 1983
An organ grinder's Pac-Monkey eats super-powered Power Pellets and grows to giant size. Now Pac-Man and Super-Pac must stop the giant Pac-Monkey before it wrecks Pac-Land.
40	"P.J. Goes Pac-Hollywood"	October 29, 1983
P.J. is starring in an action movie, and Pac-Man is goaded into becoming his stunt double.
41	"Pac Van Winkle"	November 5, 1983
Pac-Man drinks a potion that causes him to fall asleep for 20 years. When he awakes, he finds a nightmarish future in which the Power Pellet Forest has been captured by Mezmaron and the Ghost Monsters have infested Pac-Land.
42	"Happy Pacs-Giving"	November 5, 1983
The Pac-Family hear a story about the first Pacs-Giving.

== Specials ==
=== Pac-Man Halloween Special (1982) ===
The Halloween special consisted of two segments from the show, "Pacula" and "Trick or Chomp". The special aired during Saturday morning programming on ABC on October 30, 1982. It has been replayed on channels like Cartoon Network and Boomerang during Halloween in later years until 2014.

=== Christmas Comes to Pac-Land (1982) ===
In this Christmas special, Pac-Man and his family help Santa Claus (voiced by Peter Cullen) after he crash lands in Pac-Land (after the reindeer were startled by the floating eyes of the Ghost Monsters after Pac-Man, Ms. Pac-Man and Pac-Baby chomped them). Mezmeron was the only character from the cartoon that is not in the special (although his lair, which is covered in snow, appears). It was shown every December on the Boomerang Christmas Party until 2014.

== Voice cast ==
=== Main voice cast ===
- Marty Ingels as Pac-Man
- Peter Cullen as Sour Puss
- Barry Gordon as Inky
- Darryl Hickman as P.J. (Season 2)
- Allan Lurie as Mezmaron
- Chuck McCann as Blinky, Pinky
- Barbara Minkus as Pepper (Ms. Pac-Man)
- Lorenzo Music as Super-Pac (Season 2)
- Neil Ross as Clyde
- Susan Silo as Sue
- Russi Taylor as Pac-Baby
- Frank Welker as Chomp-Chomp, Morris, Adult Pac-Baby

=== Additional voices ===
- Bill Callaway (season 2)
- Jodi Carlisle (season 1)
- Brian Cummings (season 2)
- Patrick Fraley (season 2)
- Joan Gerber (season 2)
- Arte Johnson (season 2)
- Paul Kirby
- Chris Latta (season 2)
- Julie McWhirter as Dinky (two episodes from seasons 1 and 2)
- Kris Stevens (season 2)
- Andre Stojka (season 2)
- Janet Waldo (season 2)
- Lennie Weinrib (season 1) – Count Pacula (ep. 7)

== Broadcast history ==
Pac-Man aired on ABC Saturday Morning in the following formats:

- The Pac-Man/Little Rascals/Richie Rich Show (September 25, 1982 – September 3, 1983)
- The Pac-Man/Rubik, the Amazing Cube Hour (September 10, 1983 – September 1, 1984)

Since the original run, reruns have turned up on the USA Cartoon Express on USA in the 1980s, Cartoon Network from 1995 to 1999, and Boomerang from 2000 to 2014. The Christmas-themed episode aired each year as part of The Boomerang Christmas Party, an annual marathon of classic Christmas cartoons, but is no longer seen on the channel's rotation. As of February 23, 2025, the series currently airs in reruns on MeTV Toons. In the United Kingdom it was first broadcast on TVAM as a part of the Roland Rat show.

== Home media ==
In 2012, Warner Archive released both seasons of Pac-Man on DVD in region 1 as part of their Hanna–Barbera Classics Collection. The first season was released on January 31, followed by the release of the second season on September 11. The Christmas-themed episode is included on the Season 2 DVD despite airing during the show's first season.

== See also ==
- List of television series based on video games
