= Christian Hoff =

American actor (born 1968)

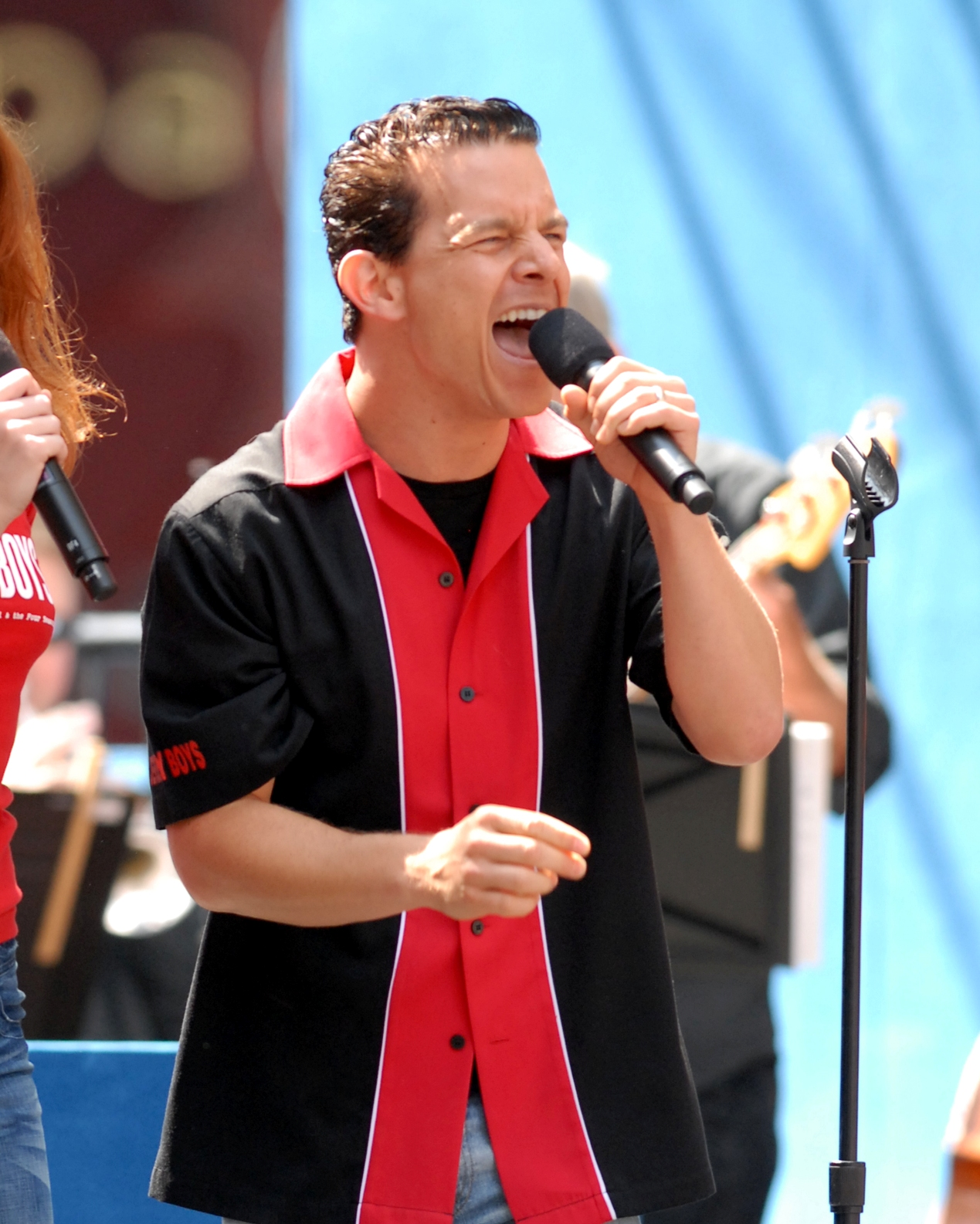
- Hoff in Broadway on Broadway in 2006
- Born: April 21, 1968 (age 58); San Francisco, California, U.S.
- Occupation: Actor
- Years active: 1976–present
- Spouse: Melissa Hoff
- Children: 5
- Website: http://www.christianhoff.com

Christian Hoff (born April 21, 1968) is an American actor.

== Biography ==
Hoff was born on April 21, 1968, in San Francisco, California, and later moved with his family to San Diego, California. At 8 years old, he began acting at the San Diego Junior Theater, and later acted in The Music Man.

=== Career ===
He starred until 2008 in the original cast production of Jersey Boys which opened at the August Wilson theater on Broadway in 2005. His portrayal of Tommy DeVito, one of the founding members of Four Seasons musical group, won him the "Best Featured Actor in a Musical" Tony award in 2006. He was scheduled to return to Broadway in the Roundabout Theatre's 2008 production of Pal Joey in the title role; however due to an injury he was forced to leave the production.

He is currently with The Midtown Men, a group that consist of four former cast members of Jersey Boys who perform music from the 1960s. Hoff holds the world record for "Most Character Voices in an Audio Book" for Tell Me How You Love the Picture, based on the career of movie producer Ed Feldman. In it, he performs 241 separate voices.

=== Personal life ===
He is married to the actress Melissa Hoff and together they have three daughters: Elizabeth, Evelyn and Ella. Christian has two children from a previous marriage: Eli and Erika.

=== Filmography ===
- All My Children
- In Love and War
- ER
- Evening Shade
- Growing Pains
- JAG
- Kids Incorporated
- Law & Order: Criminal Intent
- Star Trek IV: The Voyage Home
- Millennium
- Party of Five
- Richie Rich
- The Commish
- Quincy, M.E.
- Quantum Leap
- Who's the Boss?
- Ugly Betty
- Law & Order: Special Victims Unit

=== Stage ===
- Jersey Boys (Tommy DeVito, Original Cast Album)
- Pal Joey (Joey Evans, injured during previews)
- The Who's Tommy (Pinball Lad, Original Cast Album)
- Jesus Christ Superstar (King Herod)
- George M! (George M. Cohan)
- The Will Rogers Follies (Will Rogers)
