= The New Scooby and Scrappy-Doo Show =

American animated television series

- Also known as: The New Scooby and Scrappy-Doo Show (1983); The New Scooby-Doo Mysteries (1984)
- Genre: Mystery; Adventure; Comedy
- Created by: Joe Ruby; Ken Spears
- Developed by: Tom Ruegger
- Directed by: Oscar Dufau; Rudy Zamora; George Gordon; Carl Urbano; John Walker; Ray Patterson
- Voices of: Don Messick; Casey Kasem; Heather North; Marla Frumkin; Frank Welker
- Country of origin: United States
- Original language: English
- No. of seasons: 2
- No. of episodes: 26 (52 segments)

Production
- Executive producers: William Hanna; Joseph Barbera
- Producers: Art Scott; Tom Ruegger; Kay Wright; George Singer
- Running time: 22 minutes (11 minutes per segment)
- Production company: Hanna-Barbera Productions

Original release
- Network: ABC
- Release: September 10, 1983 – December 1, 1984

Related
- Scooby-Doo and Scrappy-Doo (1980–82); The 13 Ghosts of Scooby-Doo (1985)

The New Scooby and Scrappy-Doo Show (known as The New Scooby-Doo Mysteries for its second season) is an American animated television series produced by Hanna-Barbera Productions, and the sixth incarnation of the Scooby-Doo franchise. It premiered on September 10, 1983, and ran for two seasons on ABC. The series features the return of Daphne as a regular character, and in season two, Fred and Velma briefly return to the show after a four-year absence.

Thirteen half-hour episodes composed of twenty-four separate segments were produced under the New Scooby and Scrappy-Doo title in 1983, and thirteen more episodes composed of twenty separate segments were produced under the New Scooby-Doo Mysteries title in 1984. At the time, Margaret Loesch, serving as supervising executive for the series, worked for animation company Marvel Productions.

== Overview ==
=== Season 1 ===
For this incarnation of the show, Hanna-Barbera attempted to combine elements of both the original mystery-solving format and the newer Scooby-Doo and Scrappy-Doo comedy shorts format. Daphne Blake was also added back to the cast after a three-year absence. The plots of each episode feature her, Shaggy Rogers, Scooby-Doo, and Scrappy-Doo solving supernatural mysteries under the cover of being reporters for a teen magazine. Each half-hour program was made up of two 11-minute episodes, which would upon occasion be two parts of one half-hour-long episode.

=== Season 2 ===
The second season of this format, broadcast as The New Scooby-Doo Mysteries in 1984, continued the same format, and included six two-part episodes featuring original Scooby-Doo characters Fred Jones and/or Velma Dinkley, both absent from the series for five years. Fred's last name is given as "Rogers" initially in his return appearance to the series in the episode "Happy Birthday, Scooby-Doo," although later in the same episode it is corrected as "Jones". Rogers had been established as Shaggy's surname the previous season. The New Scooby-Doo Mysteries theme song is performed in the style of Thriller-era Michael Jackson. The accompanying opening credits feature shots of a row of monsters (consisting of a Sea Demon from "Scoo-Be or Not Scoo-Be?", Count Dracula, Frankenstein's Monster, Igor, and the Wolfman from "A Halloween Hassle at Dracula's Castle", and a Gorgon that didn't appear in any of the episodes) dancing like the zombies in Jackson's "Thriller" music video.

== Episodes ==
=== Season 1 (The New Scooby and Scrappy-Doo Show) (1983) ===
No. overall	No. in season	Title	Villain	Identity	Original release date
1	1	"Scooby The Barbarian"	Olaf the Terrible	Professor Buzby	September 10, 1983
1	1	"No Sharking Zone"	The Seaweed Monster and the Great White Shark	Cowabunga Carlyle and a submarine piloted by him	September 10, 1983
Scooby The Barbarian: The gang tries to solve a mystery involving the disappearance of an archaeologist, and the appearance of Viking ghosts. No Sharking Zone: A surfing competition, on the island of Scareuba, is jeopardized by a Great White Shark and a Seaweed Monster, who are said to guard a lost treasure.
2	2	"Scoobygeist"	The Ghosts	Real Ghosts	September 10, 1983
2	2	"The Quagmire Quake Caper"	The Mud Monster	Quanto	September 10, 1983
Scoobygeist: The gang spends the night at a mansion invaded by a host of ghosts like a face in the fireplace, the ghosts under the bed, the living animal heads, a skeleton, a living statue, and an organ-playing ghost. NOTE: This segment is a spoof of the 1982 blockbuster horror movie, Poltergeist starring Craig T. Nelson and JoBeth Williams. The Quagmire Quake Caper: The gang investigates the cause of a series of earthquakes erupting in Mexico, which seem to unleash a mud monster upon a Native American tribe.
3	3	"Hound of the Scoobyvilles"	The Hound of the Barkervilles	Bentley	September 17, 1983
3	3	"The Dinosaur Deception"	The Dinosaur	A giant excavation robot controlled by Dr. La Rue	September 17, 1983
Hound of the Scoobyvilles: The gang heads to Barkerville Hall in Scotland, where a legendary hound is haunting the grounds, but everyone thinks it's Scooby. NOTE: This segment is based on the 1972 telefilm, The Hound of the Baskervilles, which aired on ABC as part of their Movie of the Weekend starring Stewart Granger as Sherlock Holmes and Bernard Fox as Doctor Watson. The Dinosaur Deception: The gang tries to find an archaeologist, who seems to have been kidnapped by a dinosaur.
4	4	"The Creature Came From Chem Lab"	The Creature from Chem Lab	Toby Wallace	September 17, 1983
4	4	"No Thanks, Masked Manx"	The Gorilla	Milo Damp alias The Masked Manx	September 17, 1983
The Creature Came from Chem Lab: The gang tries to help Daphne's cousin, when her high school is being haunted by a slimy chemical monster. No Thanks, Masked Manx: The gang goes to visit Daphne's parents for a costume party, but the party is the next target of a cat burglar.
5	5	"Scooby of the Jungle"	Randar The Ape Man	Randal Bakko	September 24, 1983
5	5	"Scooby-Doo and Cyclops, Too"	The Zombies	People hypnotized by Mr. Cyclops	September 24, 1983
Scooby of the Jungle: The gang investigates the disappearance of animals from a game reserve at the hands of an ape man named Randar. Scooby-Doo and Cyclops, Too: The gang is supposed to be on vacation, but the trip is ruined when a local gas station owner suspected that people were turned into zombies. NOTE: The white suits Mr. Cyclops and Ivan were wearing resemble the same white suits worn by Mr. Roarke and Tattoo. The episode inspired by Fantasy Island (1978–1984).
6	6	"Scooby Roo"	The Neanderthal Monster of Devil's Rock	Darcy	October 1, 1983
6	6	"Scooby's Gold Medal Gambit"	The Chameleon	N/A	October 1, 1983
Scooby Roo: The gang goes to Australia where sheep have been disappearing, courtesy of a Neanderthal monster that is roaming around Devil's Rock. Scooby's Gold Medal Gambit: A criminal master of disguise, known as "The Chameleon", escapes from jail and plans to steal some medals at an international sporting event.
7	7	"Wizards and Warlocks"	The Tower Wizard	The Tower Wizard	October 8, 1983
7	7	"Scoobsie"	The Phantom of the Soaps	Danny Devine	October 8, 1983
Wizards and Warlocks: Scrappy leads Daphne, Shaggy, and Scooby in a "wizards and warlocks" game to find the other players. Scoobsie: When the star of a hospital soap opera is kidnapped by a masked phantom, the gang tries to help using Scooby (disguised as a woman, Scoobsie) as bait. NOTE: The soap opera Genuine Hospital is spoof of the ABC soap opera General Hospital and the name and plot is a spoof of the hit film Tootsie.
8	8	"The Mark of Scooby"	El Comandante	N/A	October 15, 1983
8	8	"The Crazy Carnival Caper"	The Clown	Jerry	October 15, 1983
The Mark of Scooby: After watching a play featuring a Spanish masked hero called "The Legend of the Masked Bandit", Scooby dreams of saving Daphne, Scrappy, and Shaggy from a gang of ruthless tax collectors. The Crazy Carnival Caper: Daphne and Shaggy return to their old high school fete with Scooby and Scrappy, and try to find out how their teacher disappeared in the Dunk Tank, and why a clown is after a priceless ruby.
9	9	"Scooby and the Minotaur"	The Minotaur	Mr. Kronos	October 29, 1983
9	9	"Scooby Pinch Hits"	The Ghost of Casey O'Riley	Reggie Rungout	October 29, 1983
Scooby and the Minotaur: The gang goes to Greece, where a group of treasure hunters, trying to find the Golden Fleece, are being scared away by a Minotaur. Scooby Pinch Hits: The ghost of a baseball legend named Casey O'Riley haunts his old baseball stadium and Scooby and the gang are on the case.
10	10	"The Fall Dog"	The Gremlin	Mickey Hack	November 5, 1983
10	10	"The Scooby Coupe"	The Spectre of Sports Cars	Crocker Pitt	November 5, 1983
The Fall Dog: A detour finds the gang doing stunts for a Hollywood movie that is being haunted by a gremlin. NOTE: The name and premise is a spoof of the hit TV series The Fall Guy. The Scooby Coupe: The gang goes to a car show to interview a car-maker about his new sports car, but the car is haunted by a spectre.
11	11	"Who's Minding The Monster?"	Frankenstein	Real Monsters	November 26, 1983
11	11	"Scooby a la Mode"	The Ghost of Chef Maras	Chef Gustav	November 26, 1983
Who's Minding the Monster?: The gang visits Transylvania to babysit for Count Dracula when the old babysitter (Frankenstein) disappears with short circuit brain malfunction. Scooby ala Mode: The gang is in Paris to interview the owner of a catering school, but the ghost of the school's founder Chef Maras is haunting it.
12	12	"Where's Scooby Doo? Part 1 & 2"	The Mummy and Beatrice Whimsey	Sidney Gaspar (assisted by the Mystery Club) and The Evil Spy Lady	December 3, 1983
Daphne, Shaggy, and Scrappy must work quickly in order to find out where Scooby has disappeared to, after the appearance of an ancient mummy aboard a train.
13	13	"Wedding Bell Boos! Part 1 & 2"	The Ghost of McBaggy Rogers	Alex Anders	December 10, 1983
Daphne, Shaggy, Scooby, and Scrappy head to the house of Shaggy's parents where his sister Maggie is getting married with relatives of Shaggy and Scooby in attendance. The ghost of Shaggy's pilgrim ancestor McBaggy Rogers tries to stop the wedding of Maggie. The gang is on the case to solve the mystery and get the wedding running on schedule.

=== Season 2 (The New Scooby-Doo Mysteries) (1984) ===
No. overall	No. in season	Title	Villain	Identity	Original release date
14	1	"Happy Birthday, Scooby-Doo Part 1 & 2"	The Red Skull	Stuyvesant the Butler (posing as Milo Spender)	September 8, 1984
The gang is invited to a television studio in Los Angeles for Scooby's birthday, which is to be celebrated with a This is Your Life-style special hosted by Mark Winkendale and directed by Milo Spender. To Scooby’s happiness, he also reunites with Velma and Fred on the show, both of whom have gotten their own careers. However, a vengeful villain from Scooby's past called the Red Skull tries to ruin the night for him and the gang.
15	2	"Scooby's Peep-Hole Pandemonium"	Maid Mummy	Orson Kane	September 15, 1984
15	2	"The Hand of Horror"	The Helping Hand	Controlled by Ratfield posing as one of the Von Gizmo Twins	September 15, 1984
Scooby's Peep-Hole Pandemonium: The gang is hired by newspaper publisher Orson Kane to interview the reclusive Norma Deathman, who lives with her monstrous servants. Since she is having a birthday party, the gang disguises themselves as caterers in order to gain entry to her house, but when Deathman realizes who the gang actually is, they have to run for their lives from her and her monsters. The Hand of Horror: When Shaggy takes a wrong turn, the gang end up at a mansion owned by the Von Gizmo Twins. Ratfield leaves the house after being fired and tells the gang to leave too. They head in and find the two bickering Von Gizmo Twins. Then, a mysterious, disembodied hand pesters the gang.
16	3	"Scoo-Be or Not Scoo-Be?"	The Sea Demons and The Ghost of Hamlet	Rosey Cran, Gilly Stern and Yorick	September 22, 1984
16	3	"The Stoney Glare Stare"	The Cyclops	Professor Mikos	September 22, 1984
Scoo-Be or Not Scoo-Be?: While on a cheap European tour, the gang stays at a hotel in Denmark where a group of sea demons are haunting the area. Things get even weirder when the ghost of Hamlet suddenly appears. The Stoney Glare Stare: In Greece, Scooby, Scrappy, Shaggy, and Daphne and a secret agent (taking the role of a café owner) head to find a missing professor and stop Thaddeus Blimp and his henchman Wilmer from turning al his enemies and the world leaders to stone using the Mask of Medusa. Though both sides have to contend with a Cyclops.
17	4	"Mission: Un-Doo-Able"	Mastermind	Cecil the Tour Guide	September 29, 1984
17	4	"The Bee Team"	The Giant Bees	Harley Finster and Foreign Spies	September 29, 1984
Mission Un-Doo-Able: Scooby and the gang try to stop a mastermind criminal from taking over the world by infiltrating his secret lair at the Statue of Liberty in New York City. The Bee Team: The gang heads to a honey farm where giant bees are frightening the nearby town.
18	5	"Doom Service"	The Ghost of Ebenezer Overview	Mrs. Van Loon	October 6, 1984
18	5	"A Code in the Nose"	Major Berch	Codefinger	October 6, 1984
Doom Service: The Ghost of Ebenezer Overview has returned to haunt his hotel in the mountains called the Overview Hotel. Can Scooby and the gang find out what is happening before the last two guests leave? A Code in the Nose: When a supervillain named Codefinger steals a top-secret decoding device and hides it in Pingley's Dept. store, the military recruits the gang to help them find it. They end up in a crazy situation when they talk secret code to the household appliances in the store.
19	6	"Ghost of the Ancient Astronauts Part 1 & 2"	The Aliens	Harriet Mullens, her associate, Mr. Abdul, Mr. Punjab	October 13, 1984
In South America, the gang joins Fred, Velma, and Velma's uncle Cosmo on an expedition in the Amazon rainforest while investigating a mystery involving ancient aliens while contending with zombies, snakes, a crooked archaeologist, her parrot Jocko, and her unnamed associate and his two bumbling henchman.
20	7	"The Night of the Living Toys"	The Evil Elf	Kartina Kobald	October 20, 1984
20	7	"South Pole Vault"	The Mad Sea Lion	Dr. Carlin	October 20, 1984
The Night of the Living Toys: The gang visits a toy store where toys are coming alive everywhere. South Pole Vault: The gang visits a research center in the South Pole where a mad sea lion is terrorizing everyone.
21	8	"A Halloween Hassle at Dracula's Castle Part 1 & 2"	Chandra and The Ghost of Dr. Van Helsing	Chandra and Igor	October 27, 1984
On Halloween night after being lured to a party at a castle, the gang who are accompanied by Fred and Velma discover that the party is held by the actually Count Dracula, his wife, and their assistant Igor with guests like Frankenstein's monster, the Wolfman, the Mummy, the Gill-man, and the Invisible Man. The gang must help the monsters take on the evil magician Chandra and a ghost of known monster hunter Dr. Van Helsing before it's too late. Note: The Gill-man's character art is recycled from the Sea Demon's character art from "Scoo-Be or Not Scoo-Be?"
22	9	"A Night Louse at the White House Part 1 & 2"	The Ghosts of George Washington, Theodore Roosevelt, Ulysses S. Grant, and Abraham Lincoln	Ambassador Walker of Klopstokia and his wife	November 3, 1984
Velma invites the gang to a NASA banquet at the White House, but the ghosts of Presidents Abraham Lincoln, Theodore Roosevelt, Ulysses S. Grant, and George Washington show up during the event and cause chaos. After seeing a misunderstanding with Scooby on TV, his parents head out to Washington DC to help him. Note: Fred does not appear in this two-part episode.
23	10	"Showboat Scooby"	The Ghost of Colonel Beaurguard	Pops Baloney	November 10, 1984
23	10	"The 'Dooby Dooby Doo' Ado"	The Showgirl	The Laser Band Thief	November 10, 1984
Showboat Scooby: Scooby's southern cousin Dixie Doo is being haunted by a Civil War ghost during a performance on her showboat, and Scooby and the gang try to help her. The 'Dooby Dooby Doo' Ado: Scooby and the gang visit Scooby's relative Dooby Dooby Doo in Las Vegas where his gig is attacked by the Laser Band Thief.
24	11	"Sherlock Doo Part 1 & 2"	The Ghost of Sherlock Holmes	Mr. Stapleton	November 17, 1984
Fred joins the gang in a mystery-solvers' contest at the home of Sherlock Holmes in London where they encounter the other contest participants Iggy and Ziggy Moriarty. While solving one of Sherlock Holmes’s old cases, the Ghost of Sherlock Holmes appears. But is his goal to assist the gang in solving the mystery or frame them for a theft? Note: Velma does not appear in this two-part episode.
25	12	"A Scary Duel With a Cartoon Ghoul"	The Monster Mutt	Dimwittie	November 24, 1984
25	12	"E*I*E*I*O"	The Monster Mouse	A normal mouse enlarged by Parker	November 24, 1984
A Scary Duel With a Cartoon Ghoul: A cartoon villain named Monster Mutt jumps out of a TV and wreaks havoc. E*I*E*I*O: While the gang goes on mysteries on a countryside at Old MacDonald’s E.I.E.I.O. (short for Experimental Institute for Evolutionary Improvement of Organisms). A genetic experiment on a field mouse making it a thirty-foot tall monster mouse and terrorize his farm.
26	13	"The Nutcracker Scoob Part 1 & 2"	The Ghost of Christmas Never	Nanette Musette	December 1, 1984
A scrooge named Winslow Nickelby tries to close down a children's home so he can have it for himself. Meanwhile, a ghost is also haunting the children's home, just when Fred and the gang decorate for Christmas. Could these two things have any connection? Note: Velma does not appear in this two-part episode.

== Voice cast ==
=== Main ===
- Don Messick – Scooby-Doo, Scrappy-Doo
- Casey Kasem – Norville "Shaggy" Rogers
- Heather North – Daphne Blake

=== Supporting ===
- Marla Frumkin - Velma Dinkley
- Frank Welker - Fred Jones

== Home media ==
=== American releases ===
Name	Release date	Episode(s) included
Scooby-Doo - A Halloween Hassle at Dracula's Castle (VHS)	September 10, 1996	S2E8 - A Halloween Hassle at Dracula's Castle
Scooby-Doo - A Nutcracker Scoob (VHS)	September 24, 1996	S2E13 - The Nutcracker Scoob
Scooby-Doo - Wedding Bell Boos (VHS)	January 14, 1997	S1E13 - Wedding Bell Boos!
Scooby-Doo! Winter WonderDog (VHS & DVD)	October 8, 2002	S2E13 - The Nutcracker Scoob
Scooby-Doo! 13 Spooky Tales Around the World (DVD)	May 15, 2012	S2E6 - Ghosts of The Ancient Astronauts
Scooby-Doo! 13 Spooky Tales: Holiday Chills and Thrills (DVD)	October 16, 2012	S2E13 - The Nutcracker Scoob
Scooby-Doo! Mask of the Blue Falcon (DVD & Blu-ray*)	February 26, 2013	S1E10b - The Scooby Coupe (*) SD-only on Blu-ray
Scooby-Doo! 13 Spooky Tales: Run for Your 'Rife (DVD)	September 10, 2013	S2E3b - The Stoney Glare Stare
Scooby-Doo! 13 Spooky Tales: Ruh Roh Robot (DVD)	September 24, 2013	S1E3b - The Dinosaur Deception; S2E2b - The Hand of Horror; S2E5 - Doom Service/A Code in the Nose; S2E4b - The Bee Team; S2E9 - A Night Louse in the White House
Scooby-Doo! 13 Spooky Tales: Field Of Screams (DVD)	May 13, 2014	S1E9 - Scooby and the Minotaur/Scooby Pinch Hits
Scooby-Doo! Favorite Frights	September 15, 2015	S2E3a - Scoo-Be or Not Scoo-Be
Scooby-Doo! and the Creepy Carnival (DVD)	May 2, 2017	S1E8b - The Creepy Carnival Caper
Happy Spook-Day, Scooby-Doo! (DVD)	August 29, 2017	S2E1 - Happy Birthday, Scooby-Doo!
Scooby-Doo! and the Skeletons (DVD)	October 2, 2018	S1E11 - Who's Minding the Monster/Scooby a la Mode
Best of Warner Bros. 50 Cartoon Collection: Scooby-Doo! (DVD)	August 13, 2019	S2E1 - Happy Birthday, Scooby-Doo!

=== International releases ===
Name	Release date	Episode(s) included
Scooby-Doo - Hanna-Barbera Personal Favorites (VHS)	1988	S1E7a - Wizards and Warlocks
Best of Warner Bros. 50 Cartoon Collection: Scooby-Doo! (DVD)	2019	S2E1 - Happy Birthday, Scooby-Doo!; S1E1 - Scoobygeist/The Quagmire Quake Caper; S1E2 - Scooby the Barbarian/No Sharking Zone
