= Marshall Efron =

American actor and humorist (1938–2019)

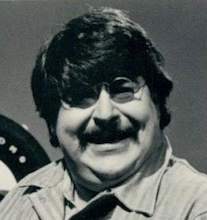
- Born: February 3, 1938; Los Angeles, California, U.S.
- Died: September 30, 2019 (aged 81); Englewood, New Jersey, U.S.
- Occupations: Actor, humorist
- Years active: 1941–2019

Marshall Efron (February 3, 1938 – September 30, 2019) was an American actor and humorist originally known for his work on the listener-sponsored Pacifica radio stations WBAI New York and KPFK Los Angeles, and later for the PBS television show The Great American Dream Machine (the original showcase of Chevy Chase).

== Career ==
At WBAI, Efron was a frequent guest on Steve Post's & Bob Fass's shows, along with left-wing/counter-culture figures such as Paul Krassner. One memorable broadcast had Efron and Krassner filling in for the vacationing Steve Post, and identifying themselves as Columbia University students who had taken the station over as part of the Columbia University protests of 1968. Although regular listeners were very familiar with the voices of Krassner and Efron, many listeners were not. NYPD officers responded three different times during the broadcast in response to reports from listeners who thought the "takeover" was a legitimate event. Efron also produced features such as A Satirical View.

Marshall Efron was the author of a number of children's works such as Bible Stories You Can't Forget: No Matter How Hard You Try.

He also starred in the irregularly scheduled Sunday morning television program Marshall Efron's Illustrated, Simplified, and Painless Sunday School on CBS from 1973 to 1977. In this show, Efron played all of the parts, including Adam, Eve, God and the Snake in the Garden of Eden, and the Three Wise Men in the story of Christmas.

== Death ==
Efron died from cardiac arrest at the age of 81 on September 30, 2019, at the Lillian Booth Actors Home in Englewood, New Jersey.

== Filmography ==
=== Animated roles ===
- The Kwicky Koala Show (1981) - Ratso (voice)
- The Smurfs (1982) - Sloppy Smurf (voice)
- Shirt Tales (1982) - (voice)
- The Biskitts (1983) - Mooch (voice)
- Kidd Video (1984-1985) - Fat Cat (voice)
- The 13 Ghosts of Scooby-Doo (1985) - Lousy Lizard (voice)
- Fluppy Dogs (1986) - Stanley (voice)
- The Transformers (1986-1987) - Hun-Gurrr (2nd Head) (voice)
- Snorks (1987-1988) - (voice)
- Time Squad (2002) - Earl of Sandwich (voice)

=== Film roles ===
- Funnyman (1967) - Sid, Photographer
- Pound (1970) - German Shepherd
- THX 1138 (1971) - TWA
- Doc (1971) - Mexican Bartender
- Is There Sex After Death? (1971) - Vince Domino
- Dynamite Chicken (1971) - Himself
- Bang the Drum Slowly (1973) - Bradley
- Blade (1973) - Fat man
- Baby Blue Marine (1976) - Cook
- The Faking of the President (1976) - Donald Segretti
- Why Me? (1978, Short) - Nesbit Spoon (voice)
- California Dreaming (1979) - Ruben
- Shogun Assassin (1980) - (voice)
- The First Time (1983) - Nick Rand
- Twice Upon a Time - Synonamess Botch (voice)
- Bad Manners (1984) - Cab Driver
- The Big Bang (1987) - Comrade in Chief (English version, voice)
- Talking Walls (1987) - Erwin
- The Road to Wellville (1994) - Bartholomew Bookbinder
- Cafe Society (1995) - Moe Persky
- Two Family House (2000) - Tiny
- A Piece of Eden (2000) - Andres
- Marie and Bruce (2004) - Ed
- Home on the Range (2004) - Larry the Duck (voice)
- Robots (2005) - Lamp Post / Toilet Bot / Bass Drum / Microphone (voice)
- Valiant (2005) - Additional Voice (voice)
- The Thing About My Folks (2005) - Tow Truck Driver
- Ice Age: The Meltdown (2006) - Start Dad (voice)
- Horton Hears a Who! (2008) - Wickersham Guard #1 / The Wickersham Brothers (voice)
- City Island (2009) - Actor-Dog
- Rob the Mob (2014) - Little Anthony (final film role)

=== Video game roles ===
- The Space Bar (1997) - (voice)

=== Theatrical roles ===
- Much Ado about Nothing Broadway 1972 - Singer

== Discography ==
- The Nutrino News Network, with Barton Heyman, Dennis Longwell and Marilyn Sokol. Polydor PD-5029 (1972)
