= ABC Rocks =

- Genre: Music Video
- Directed by: Joe Dea
- Country of origin: United States
- Original language: English

Production
- Running time: 30 minutes

Original release
- Release: June 22, 1984 – August 2, 1985

ABC Rocks is an American music video show broadcast on ABC from June 22, 1984, to August 2, 1985. The thirty-minute show aired on Friday nights at midnight and featured popular rock videos by artists such as Prince, Billy Idol and David Bowie. It is notable as ABC's attempt to produce a show comparable to cable's MTV and NBC's Friday Night Videos.
