= John Walker (animator) =

American animator and director

John Walker was an American animator and director. His first credit was The Dick Tracy Show. He directed various animations from 1960 to 1994.

== See also ==
- A Charlie Brown Christmas (1965) - graphic blandishment
- Charlie Brown's All-Stars (1966) - graphic blandishment
- You're in Love, Charlie Brown (1967) - graphic blandishment
