= Rudy Zamora =

Mexican American animator and director

- Born: Joaquin Rudolfo Zamora; March 26, 1910; Mexico City, Mexico
- Died: July 29, 1989 (aged 79)
- Occupations: Animator, animation director
- Years active: 1927–1987

Joaquin Rudolfo Zamora (March 26, 1910 – July 29, 1989) was a Mexican-American animator and animation director. His credits include, among others, The Rocky and Bullwinkle Show, The Jetsons, The Smurfs, The Biskitts, and Peanuts.

== Career ==
Zamora was born in Mexico City, Mexico, but raised in the United States. As a young adult, he read a help wanted ad in the local newspaper seeking a male animator at Pat Sullivan's studio. Despite Zamora having no prior experience in the field, he was intrigued and applied. His test entailed tracing a photo of Felix the Cat, and Zamora was hired after placing second among three men. Zamora was still employed at Pat Sullivan's in 1928.

He was hired as an inbetweener at Fleischer Studios in 1930, and eventually became an animator there. Shamus Culhane described Zamora as "the star" among the new batch of animators at Fleischer.

Following his stint at Fleischer, Zamora worked at Walt Disney Productions during the early 1930s, with Ed Benedict as his assistant. While there, Zamora animated on Silly Symphony cartoons, including The China Plate (1931). Zamora had a reputation for spending too much time playing practical jokes as opposed to working, and for this reason was fired by Walt Disney in 1932.

By the 1940s he was an animator at the Metro-Goldwyn-Mayer cartoon department, working on short films during World War II. In 1944, he was one of several animators of the Woody Woodpecker short The Barber of Seville. This cartoon was later chosen as one of The 50 Greatest Cartoons in 1994. Throughout the 1960s, Zamora served as director for Rocky & Bullwinkle and Peabody's Improbable History, also overseeing Mexican animators who worked on the series.

At the twilight of his career, Zamora was a director at Hanna-Barbera. He helmed episodes of Richie Rich, The New Scooby and Scrappy-Doo Show and Laverne & Shirley, an animated adaptation of the sitcom. Zamora directed a Christmas episode of The Smurfs that aired in 1983. Zamora's last credit was the 1987 television film Yogi Bear and the Magical Flight of the Spruce Goose.
