= Carl Urbano =

American animator and director

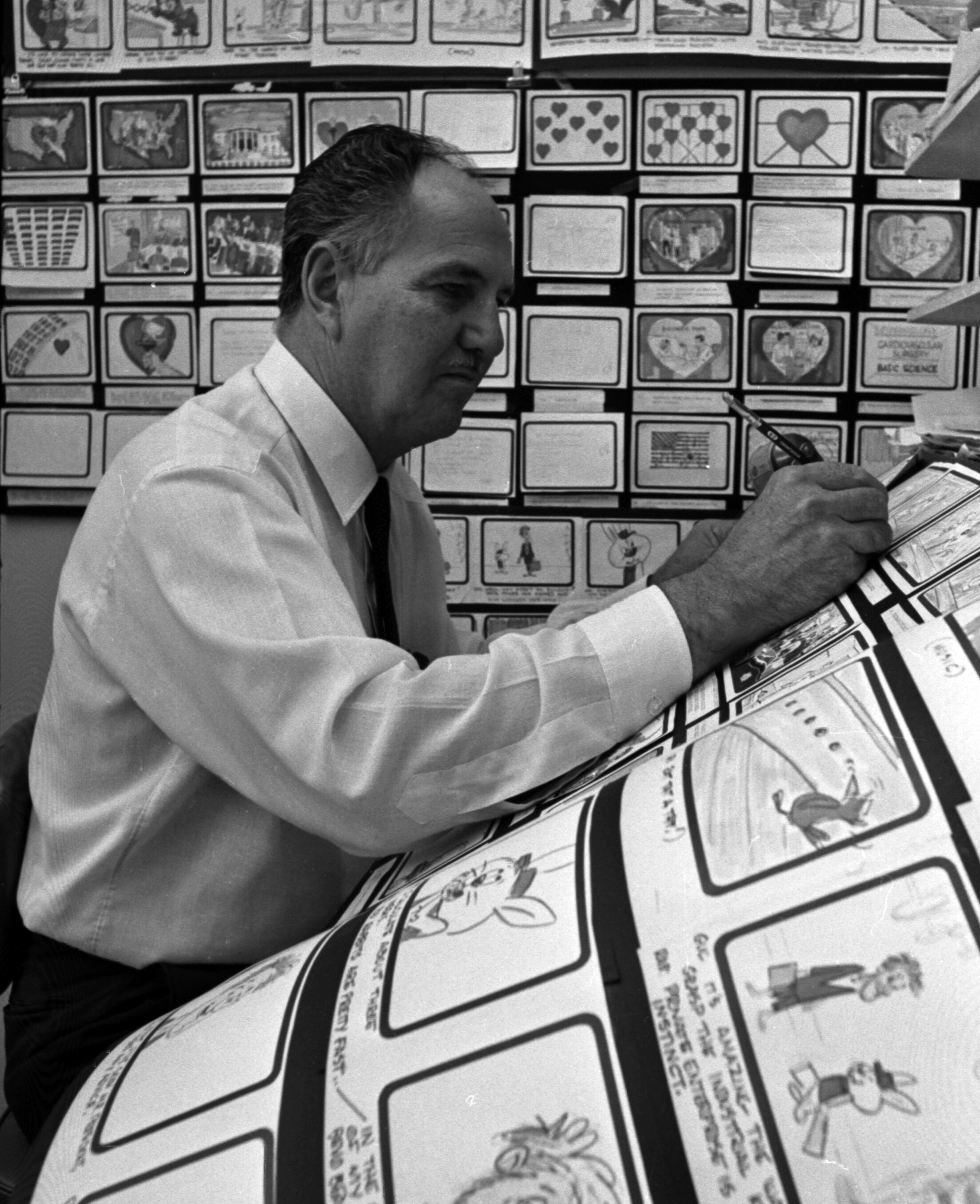
Urbano working on a storyboard, 1967

Carl Urbano (December 20, 1910 – October 16, 2003) was an American animator and director, best remembered for the promotional animated short A Is for Atom (1953) which promotes atomic energy.

== Life ==
During the 1950s, Carl would be found directing for John Sutherland Productions, directing theatrical quality cartoons for industry.

Later in his career, he was at H-B directing under supervisor Ray Patterson at Hanna-Barbera Productions.

Some of his directing credits at Hanna-Barbera include:

- Godzilla (1978–1979)
- Scooby's All Stars (1978) Season 2
- Challenge of the Superfriends (1978)
- Yogi's Space Race (1978)
- Buford and the Galloping Ghost (1979)
- The New Fred and Barney Show (1979)
- Fred and Barney Meet the Thing (1979)
- Fred and Barney Meet the Shmoo (1979–1980)
- Scooby-Doo and Scrappy-Doo (1979)
- The Flintstones' New Neighbors (1980)
- The Smurfs (1981)
- The Flintstone Kids (1986–1988)
- Tom & Jerry Kids (1990–1993)
