= List of animated television series of 1982 =

This is a list of animated television series that first aired in 1982.

Animated television series first aired in 1982
Title	Episodes	Country	Year	Notes	Technique
Acrobunch	24	Japan	1982		Anime
Arcadia of My Youth: Endless Orbit SSX	22	Japan	1982–83		Anime
Armored Fleet Dairugger XV	52	Japan	1982–83		Anime
Asari-chan	54	Japan	1982–83		Anime
Boy General	100	North Korea	1982–2019		Traditional
Combat Mecha Xabungle	50	Japan	1982–83		Anime
Don Dracula	8	Japan	1982		Anime
Les Engrenages	3	France	1982		Traditional
The Flintstone Funnies	45	United States	1982–84	Repackaged reruns of The Flintstone Comedy Show.	Traditional
The Flying House	52	Japan	1982–83		Anime
Fuku-chan	71	Japan	1982–84		Anime
Galactic Gale Baxingar	39	Japan	1982–83		Anime
Game Center Arashi	26	Japan	1982		Anime
The Gary Coleman Show	13	United States	1982	Based on The Kid with the Broken Halo.	Traditional
Gilligan's Planet	13	United States	1982	Spin-off of The New Adventures of Gilligan.	Traditional
Gyakuten! Ippatsuman	58	Japan	1982–83		Anime
The Incredible Hulk	13	United States	1982–83		Traditional
Jokebook	7	United States	1982		Traditional
The Kabocha Wine	95	Japan	1982–84		Anime
Laverne & Shirley with the Fonz	8	United States	1982	Spin-off of The Fonz and the Happy Days Gang and Laverne and Shirley in the Army.	Traditional
Little Pollon	46	Japan	1982–83		Anime
The Little Rascals	22	United States	1982–83	Spin-off of Our Gang. Originally a segment on The Pac-Man/Little Rascals/Richie Rich Show, and later The Monchhichis/Little Rascals/Richie Rich Show.	Traditional
Lucy-May of the Southern Rainbow	50	Japan	1982		Anime
Magical Princess Minky Momo	63	Japan	1982–83		Anime
Meatballs & Spaghetti	25	United States	1982–83		Traditional
Meister Eder und sein Pumuckl	52	West Germany; Hungary; Austria	1982–89		Traditional/Live-Action
Méthanie	15	France	1982–86		Traditional
Misi mókus kalandjai	13	Hungary	1982		Stop-motion
Monica and Friends	188	Brazil	1982–2010	Is the longest-running Brazilian animated program	Traditional/Flash
Mork & Mindy	26	United States	1982–83	Spin-off of Mork & Mindy. Mork & Mindy/Laverne & Shirley/Fonz Hour segment.	Traditional
Mork & Mindy/Laverne & Shirley/Fonz Hour	26	United States	1982–83		Traditional
Murun Buchstansangur	52	United Kingdom	1982–88		Traditional
The Mysterious Cities of Gold	39	Japan; France	1982–83		Traditional
The New Adventures of Maya the Honey Bee	52	Japan	1982–83		Anime
Once Upon a Time... Space	26	France; Japan	1982–83		Traditional
Pac-Man	44	United States	1982–83	Originally a segment on The Pac-Man/Little Rascals/Richie Rich Show.	Traditional
The Pac-Man/Little Rascals/Richie Rich Show	13	United States	1982–83		Traditional
Pandamonium	13	United States	1982		Traditional
Patalliro!	49	Japan	1982–83		Anime
Pimpa	26	Italy	1982	This is the first season 1	Traditional
The Puppy's Further Adventures	21	United States	1982–83	Spin-off of The Puppy Who Wanted a Boy. The Scooby & Scrappy-Doo/Puppy Hour segment.	Traditional
Robby the Rascal	39	Japan	1982–83		Anime
The Scooby & Scrappy-Doo/Puppy Hour	13	United States	1982		Traditional
Scrappy and Yabba-Doo	13	United States	1982–84	Spin-off of Scooby-Doo and Scrappy-Doo. The Scooby & Scrappy-Doo/Puppy Hour segment.	Traditional
Shirt Tales	23	United States	1982–83		Traditional
Space Cobra	31	Japan	1982–83		Anime
Super Dimension Fortress Macross	36	Japan	1982–83		Anime
SuperTed	36	United Kingdom (Wales)	1982–86		Traditional
Thunderbirds 2086	24	Japan	1982		Anime
Tokimeki Tonight	34	Japan	1982–83		Anime
Warrior of Love Rainbowman	22	Japan	1982–83		Anime
Wil Cwac Cwac	30	United Kingdom	1982–86		Traditional

== See also ==
- List of animated feature films of 1982
- List of Japanese animation television series of 1982
