= Manuscript (disambiguation) =

A manuscript is a handwritten original or copy of a text or composition.

Manuscript may also refer to:

- Manuscript (publishing)
- Manuscript, typographic style of block letters
- Manuscript, a typeface produced by Grafotechna in the mid 1940s
- Manuscripts (journal), journal of The Manuscript Society

== Television ==
- "The Manuscript", an episode of Tales of Wells Fargo
- "The Manuscript", an episode of The Mysterious Cities of Gold
- "The Manuscript", an episode of Lady Chatterley's Stories

== Music ==
- Music manuscripts, handwritten sources of music
- The Manuscript (album), a 2016 album by Dave Hollister
- The Manuscript (My Dying Bride EP), 2013
- The Manuscript (Vic Mensa EP), 2017
- "Manuscript", 2002 single by E-A-Ski
- "Manuscript", song by Al Stewart from 1970 album Zero She Flies
- "The Manuscript", song by Taylor Swift from 2024 album The Tortured Poets Department

== Other uses ==
- The Manuscript, 1998 novel by Eva Zeller

== See also ==
- Manuscript Society
