= List of animated feature films of 1982 =

This is a list of animated feature films first released in 1982.

== List ==
Title	Country	Director	Production company	Animation technique	Format	Notes	Release date	Duration
Adrift in the Pacific 十五少年漂流記 (Jugo Shōnen Hyōryūki)	Japan	Masayuki Akehi	Toei Animation; Fuji TV	Traditional	Television film	Nineteenth animated special produced for Fuji TV's "Nissei Family Special" program.	August 22, 1982	66 minutes
The Adventures of Monica and Friends; As Aventuras da Turma da Mônica	Brazil	Mauricio de Sousa		Traditional			December 23, 1982	85 minutes
Adventures of Robinson Crusoe, a Sailor from York; Dobrodruzství Robinsona Crusoe, námorníka z Yorku	Czechoslovakia	Stanislav Látal	Krátký film Praha; Südwestfunk	Stop motion			April 1, 1982	68 minutes
Ai no Kiseki: Doctor Norman Monogatari 愛の奇跡 ドクターノーマン物語	Japan	Masami Anno; Yasuo Hasegawa	Kokusai Eiga-sha; Toei Animation	Traditional	Television film		December 24, 1982	85 minutes
Aladdin and the Magic Lamp アラジンと魔法のランプ (Sekai Meisaku Dōwa: Arajin to mahō no rampu)	Japan	Kasai Yoshinori	Toei Animation	Traditional	Theatrical	Fifth and final film in the anthology film series Sekai Meisaku Dōwa (lit. "World Masterpiece Fairy Tales").	March 13, 1982	65 minutes
Andromeda Stories アンドロメダ・ストーリーズ (Andoromeda Sutōrīzu)	Japan	Masamitsu Sasaki	Toei Animation; Nippon TV	Traditional	Television film	Fifth animated special produced for Nippon TV's 24 Hour TV "Love Saves the Earth" telethon, and the first of only three specials not to be produced by Tezuka Productions.	August 22, 1982	85 minutes
Attack of the Super Monsters	Japan	Toru Sotoyama; Tom Wyner	Tsuburaya Productions	Traditional	Direct-to-video; Compilation film	Compilation film of the animated television series Dinosaur War Izenborg that ran from October 17, 1977, to June 30, 1978, for a total of 39 episodes.	December 3, 1982	83 minutes
Autumn; Осень (Osen)	Soviet Union	Andrei Khrzhanovsky	Soyuzmultfilm	Traditional; Cutout				42 minutes
The Black Planet	Australia	Paul Williams	Fable Film Productions	Traditional				78 minutes
Bugs Bunny's 3rd Movie: 1001 Rabbit Tales	United States	Friz Freleng; Chuck Jones; Robert McKimson	Warner Bros. Animation	Traditional	Theatrical; Compilation film	Film compiled from theatrical animated shorts; fourth of six Looney Tunes compilation feature films	November 19, 1982	77 minutes
A Charlie Brown Celebration	United States	Bill Melendez	United Feature Syndicate	Traditional	Television special Anthology film	First hour-long Peanuts special.	May 24, 1982	60 minutes
A Christmas Carol	Australia		Burbank Films Australia	Traditional	Television film		December 22, 1982	75 minutes
Chronopolis	France; Poland	Piotr Kamler	Saint-André-des-Arts	Stop motion			May 1982	52 minutes
Doraemon: Nobita and the Haunts of Evil ドラえもん のび太の大魔境 (Doraemon: Nobita no Daimakyō)	Japan	Hideo Nishimaki	Toho; Shin-Ei Animation	Traditional	Theatrical		March 13, 1982	91 minutes
Dr. Poppen and the Swamp of No Return ぽっぺん先生と帰らずの沼 (Poppen-sensei to Kaerazu no Numa)	Japan	Hiromitsu Morita	Heruhen; Mainichi Broadcasting System	Traditional	Television special		April 29, 1982	91 minutes
Dr. Slump: "Hoyoyo!" Space Adventure; Dr. SLUMP "ほよよ!" 宇宙大冒険 (Dokutā Suranpu: "Hoyoyo!" Uchū Dai Bōken)	Japan	Akinori Nagaoka	Toei Animation	Traditional	Theatrical		July 10, 1982	90 minutes
Flash Gordon: The Greatest Adventure of All	United States		Filmation; King Features Syndicate	Traditional	Television film	Pilot film of the 1979–1981 animated series The New Adventures of Flash Gordon; originally produced in 1979, but did not air on television until 1982, premiering in prime time on NBC.	August 21, 1982	95 minutes
The Flight of Dragons	United States; Japan	Jules Bass; Arthur Rankin Jr.	Rankin/Bass; Topcraft	Traditional	Television film	Produced in 1982, released in 1986.	August 17, 1982	92 minutes
The Flying Windmill; Die fliegende Windmühle	East Germany	Günter Rätz	DEFA-Studio für Trickfilme	Stop motion	Theatrical	Produced from 1978 to 1981, released in 1982.	April 6, 1982	85 minutes
Future War 198X フューチャーウォー198X年 (Fyūchā Wō Ichi Kyū Hachi Ekkusu-nen)	Japan	Toshio Masuda; Tomohiro Katsumata	Toei Animation	Traditional	Theatrical		October 30, 1982	125 minutes
Gauche the Cellist セロ弾きのゴーシュ (Sero Hiki no Gōshu)	Japan	Isao Takahata	Oh! Production	Traditional	Theatrical		January 23, 1982	63 minutes
God Mars: The Movie 六神合体ゴッドマーズ (Rokushin Gattai Goddomāzu)	Japan	Tetsuo Imazawa	Tokyo Movie Shinsha	Traditional	Theatrical		December 18, 1982	97 minutes
Haedori daemoheom 해돌이 대모험 (The Great Adventure of Haedol)	South Korea	Kim Hyeon-dong	Namyoung Planning	Traditional	Theatrical			75 minutes
Haguregumo 浮浪雲 (Vagrant Cloud)	Japan	Mori Masaki	Madhouse; Toei Animation	Traditional	Theatrical		April 24, 1982	91 minutes
Heidi's Song	United States	Robert Taylor	Hanna-Barbera; Paramount Pictures	Traditional	Theatrical	Fifth animated theatrical feature production from Hanna-Barbera, and the second of three produced by the studio to not be based on its pre-existing animated series and characters.	November 19, 1982	94 minutes
Heungnyongwanggwa Bihodongja 흑룡왕과 비호동자 (The Black Dragon King and the Guardian)	South Korea	Han Heon-myeong	Geumyong Film Studio	Traditional	Theatrical	Later dubbed into English by IFD Films and Arts Ltd. in 1987 under the title of Thunder Prince.	December 21, 1982	68 minutes
Hey Good Lookin'	United States	Ralph Bakshi	Bakshi Productions; Warner Bros. Pictures	Traditional	Theatrical	Originally completed in 1975 as a live action/animation hybrid film; this was reworked seven years on into a complete animated feature.	October 1, 1982	77 minutes
Hokseongnoboteu Sseondeo A 혹성 로보트 썬더 A (Planetary Robot Thunder A)	South Korea	Jo Hang-ri, Kim Cheong-gi	Namyang Planning Co., Ltd.	Traditional	Theatrical		May 5, 1982	90 minutes
I Am a Cat 吾輩は猫である (Wagahai wa Neko de Aru)	Japan		Toei Animation; Fuji TV	Traditional	Television film	Sixteenth animated special produced for Fuji TV's "Nissei Family Special" program.	February 17, 1982	73 minutes
The Ideon: A Contact 伝説巨神イデオン 接触篇 (Densetsu Kyojin Ideon: Sesshōku-hen)	Japan	Yoshiyuki Tomino	Sunrise; Sanrio	Traditional	Theatrical		July 10, 1982	85 minutes
The Ideon: Be Invoked 伝説巨神イデオン 発動篇 (Densetsu Kyojin Ideon: Hatsudō-hen)	Japan	Yoshiyuki Tomino	Sunrise; Sanrio	Traditional	Theatrical		July 10, 1982	100 minutes
Kaibutsu-kun: Demon no Ken 怪物くん デーモンの剣 (Kaibutsu-kun: The Demon Sword)	Japan	Hiroshi Fukutomi	Toho; Shin-Ei Animation	Traditional	Theatrical		March 13, 1982	52 minutes
The Last Unicorn	United States; United Kingdom; Japan	Jules Bass; Arthur Rankin Jr.	Rankin/Bass; ITC; Topcraft	Traditional	Theatrical	Topcraft's last feature film with Rankin/Bass.	November 19, 1982	93 minutes
Mafalda	Argentina	Carlos D. Marquez	Producciones Daniel Mallo; Estudios Azúcar; Aries Cinematográfica Argentina	Traditional			December 3, 1982	82 minutes
Les Maîtres du temps Time Masters	France; Switzerland; West Germany; United Kingdom; Hungary	René Laloux; Tibor Hernádi	Image Entertainment; Pannónia Filmstúdió	Traditional	Theatrical		March 24, 1982	79 minutes
Mighty Mouse in the Great Space Chase	United States	Ed Friedman; Lou Kachivas; Marsh Lamore; Gwen Wetzler; Kay Wright; Lou Zukor	Filmation Associates; Viacom Productions	Traditional	Theatrical		December 10, 1982	86 minutes
Miss Switch to the Rescue	United States	Charles August Nichols	Ruby-Spears	Traditional	Television special	Originally aired on the ABC anthology series ABC Weekend Special as a two-part installment on the series' fifth season.	January 16–23, 1982	
Mobile Suit Gundam III: Encounters in Space 機動戦士ガンダムIII めぐりあい宇宙編 (Kidô Senshi Gandamu III: Meguriai Sorahen)	Japan	Yoshiyuki Tomino	Shochiku; Nippon Sunrise	Traditional	Theatrical		March 13, 1982	144 minutes
Naniwabushi Daisuki 浪花節大好き (I Love the Naniwabushi)	Japan	Yuji Hiragawa	Tohan Kikaku; Kansai TV		Television special	Originally aired as the twelfth installment of the Kansai TV network's one-shot variety show program Kao Master Theater.	February 7, 1982	54 minutes
Ohayō! Spank おはよう! スパンク (Ohayō! Supanku)	Japan	Shigetsugu Yoshida	Tokyo Movie Shinsha	Traditional	Theatrical		March 13, 1982	
Old Master Q: Water Tiger Tale 七彩卡通老夫子：水虎傳	Hong Kong	Hu Shuru; Wang Ze; Xie Jintu		Traditional	Theatrical			
Oliver Twist	Australia	Richard Slapczynski	Burbank Films Australia	Traditional	Television film	The inaugural production of Burbank Films Australia.	December 15, 1982	72 minutes
Pink Floyd – The Wall	United Kingdom	Alan Parker Gerald Scarfe	Metro-Goldwyn-Mayer	Traditional/Live action	Theatrical		July 15, 1982	95 minutes
The Plague Dogs	United Kingdom; United States	Martin Rosen	Nepenthe Productions	Traditional	Theatrical	When the film was released generally in the United States on January 9, 1985, it was the first animated feature to be given the PG-13 rating by the MPAA.	October 21, 1982	103 minutes
Pro Golfer Saru プロゴルファー猿 (Puro Gorufā Saru)	Japan	Hiroshi Fukutomi	Shin-Ei Animation; TV Asahi	Traditional	Television special		October 9, 1982	91 minutes
Queen Millennia 新竹取物語 1000年女王 (Shin Taketori Monogatari: Sennen Joō)	Japan	Masayuki Akehi	Toei Animation	Traditional	Theatrical		March 13, 1982	121 minutes
Sarah	Australia	Yoram Gross; Athol Henry	Yoram Gross Films	Traditional				70 minutes
Schooltime Blues; Suli-buli	Hungary	Ferenc Varsányi	Pannónia Filmstúdió	Stop motion/Live action	Theatrical		September 30, 1982	72 minutes
The Secret of NIMH	United States	Don Bluth	United Artists; Aurora Productions; Don Bluth Productions	Traditional	Theatrical	Don Bluth's first feature film after leaving Walt Disney Productions in 1979.	July 2, 1982	82 minutes
Sengoku Majin GōShōgun 戦国魔神ゴーショーグン (Civil War Devil-God GoShogun)	Japan		Ashi Productions	Traditional	Theatrical		April 24, 1982	63 minutes
Shalom Pharao	West Germany	Curt Linda	Linda Film; Zweites Deutsches Fernsehen (ZDF) atlas Film	Traditional	Theatrical		August 3, 1982	80 minutes
Shiroi Kiba White Fang Monogatari 白い牙 ホワイトファング物語 (White Fang: The Story of White Fang)	Japan	Sōji Yoshikawa; Takeyuki Kanda; Takeyuki Yokoyama	Sunrise; Fuji TV	Traditional	Television film		May 5, 1982	73 minutes
Shōnen Miyamoto Musashi – Wanpaku Nitō-ryū 少年宮本武蔵 わんぱく二刀流 (The Boy Miyamoto Musashi – Naughty Two-Sword Style)	Japan	Hideo Watanabe; Yūgo Serikawa	Toei Animation; Fuji TV	Traditional	Television film	Twentieth animated special produced for Fuji TV's "Nissei Family Special" program.	October 6, 1982	73 minutes
Son Gokuu Silk Road wo Tobu!! 孫悟空シルクロードをとぶ!! (Skip the Son Goku Silk Road!!)	Japan	Hideo Takayashiki	Tokyo Movie Shinsha; Fuji TV	Traditional	Television film	Eighteenth animated special produced for Fuji TV's "Nissei Family Special" program.	June 17, 1982	74 minutes
Space Adventure Cobra: The Movie スペースアドベンチャーコブラ (Supēsu Adobenchā Kobura)	Japan	Osamu Dezaki	Tokyo Movie Shinsha	Traditional	Theatrical		July 3, 1982	99 minutes
Space Pirate Captain Harlock: Arcadia of My Youth わが青春のアルカディア (Waga Seishun no Arukadia)	Japan	Tomoharu Katsumata	Toei Animation	Traditional	Theatrical		July 28, 1982	130 minutes
Star of the Giants 巨人の星 (Kyojin no Hoshi)	Japan	Satoshi Dezaki; Tadao Nagahama	TMS Entertainment	Traditional	Theatrical	Alternate retelling of the manga and anime series written by Ikki Kajiwara and illustrated by Noboru Kawasaki; there were four previous films based on the manga, but they were re-edited compilations of select episodes from the 1969–1971 anime.	August 21, 1982	110 minutes
Super Taekwon V 슈퍼 태권V	South Korea	Kim Cheong-gi	Seoul Donghwa	Traditional	Theatrical		August 1, 1982	75 minutes
Syupeo Majingga 3 슈퍼 마징가 3 (Super Mazinger 3)	South Korea	Bak Seung-cheol	Daegwang Planning	Traditional	Theatrical		December 18, 1982	69 minutes
Syupeo samchongsa 슈퍼 삼총사 (The Super Three Musketeers)	South Korea	Song Jeong-lyul	Cape Production	Traditional	Theatrical		August 18, 1982	76 minutes
Techno Police 21C テクノポリス21C(トウェンティワンセンチュリー) (Tekunoporisu Tuentiwan-Senchurī)	Japan	Masashi Matsumoto	Toho; Wiz Corporation; Studio Nue; Artmic	Traditional	Theatrical		August 7, 1982	79 minutes
The Treasure Planet; Планетата на съкровищата (Planetata na sakrovishtata)	Bulgaria	Rumen Petkov	Boyana Film	Traditional	Theatrical	First Bulgarian animated feature.	May 27, 1982	62 minutes
Tron	United States	Steven Lisberger	Walt Disney Productions; Lisberger-Kushner Productions	Live action/CGI	Theatrical; Live-action animated film		July 9, 1982	96 minutes
Tsushima Maru: Sayonara Okinawa 対馬丸 —さよなら沖縄—	Japan	Osamu Kobayashi	Tsushima Maru Production Committee; Herald Eiga	Traditional	Theatrical	Fictionalization based on the 1944 sinking of the Japanese ship Tsushima Maru sunk by the submarine USS Bowfin.	October 24, 1982	70 minutes
Two Down Full Base 二死満塁 (Nishi Manrui)	Japan	Tsutomu Shibayama	Toho; Group TAC; Fuji TV	Traditional	Television film	Seventeenth animated special produced for Fuji TV's "Nissei Family Special" program.	May 5, 1982	85 minutes
Urusei Yatsura: Haru da, Tobidase! うる星やつら 春だ、とびだせ! (Urusei Yatsura: It's Spring, Take Off!)	Japan		Studio Pierrot	Traditional	Television special	Broadcast between episodes 21 and 22 of the respective television series.	March 31, 1982	44 minutes
The Wizard of Oz オズの魔法使い (Ozu no mahôtsukai)	Japan	Fumihiko Takayama	Toho; Wiz Corporation; Topcraft	Traditional	Theatrical		July 1, 1982	78 minutes
Zō no Inai Dōbutsuen 象のいない動物園	Japan	Tsuneo Maeda	Group TAC	Traditional	Theatrical		March 20, 1982	79 minutes

== See also ==
- List of animated television series of 1982
