= List of Cobra the Animation episodes =

The original video animation (OVA) and anime series Cobra the Animation is based on the Cobra manga series written by Buichi Terasawa. All series were produced by Guild Project and animated by Magic Bus. The first OVA, Cobra the Animation: The Psychogun (COBRA THE ANIMATION ザ・サイコガン, Kobura Za Animēshon Za Saikogan), was directed by Buichi Terasawa, while Cobra the Animation: Time Drive, (COBRA THE ANIMATION タイム・ドライブ, Kobura Za Animēshon Taimu Doraibu) was directed by Kenichi Maejima. The anime, Cobra the Animation: The Six Heroes (COBRA THE ANIMATION 六人の勇士, Kobura Za Animēshon Rokunin no Yūshi), was directed by Keizō Shimizu.

Both OVAs were released direct-to-DVD by Happinet: The Psychogun was released between August 29, 2008, and February 27, 2009, while Time Drive was released between April 24, 2009, and June 26, 2009. Rokunin no Yūshi was broadcast by BS 11 between January 2, 2010, and March 27, 2010. The OVA were later released in a DVD box set on February 19, 2010, by Happinet. The anime series episodes were later released in seven DVD and Blu-ray compilations between April 23, 2010, and October 2, 2010, by Happinet.

On December 18, 2009, Crunchyroll and Happinet announced that Crunchyroll would begin to stream the first OVA series on that day. The last episode was streamed on January 8, 2010. The two episodes of Time Drive were uploaded on January 1, 2008. The anime series begin to be streamed on January 2, 2010, and the last episode was available on March 27, 2010, for premium users, and on April 3, 2010, for free users.

Each series used different pieces of theme music but all of them used a single opening theme and a single ending theme. The opening theme from The Psychogun is "Kizudarake no Yume" (傷だらけの夢) by Yoko Takahashi and it ending theme is "Wanderer" by Shigeru Matsuzaki. The second OVA used "Time Drive" by Sasja Antheunis as opening theme and "Kimi ga bi Waraunara" (君が微笑うなら) by Shigeru Matsuzaki as ending theme. "Cobra the Space Pirate" by Sasja Antheunis and "Kimi no Uta" (君の歌) were used respectively as opening theme and ending theme for Rokunin no Yūshi.

== Episode list ==
=== Part 1: OVA series ===
The Psychogun: Cobra travels to Mars with Professor Utopia Moore to stop the Pirate Guild unlocking secrets of the universe. Time Drive: Armaroid Lady's body starts to disappear so Cobra dives into the past to save her.

No.	Crunchyroll title Original Japanese title	Original release
1	"The Psychogun Episode 1"; Transliteration: "Kobura Za Saikogan, Vol. 1" (Japanese: コブラ ザ・サイコガンvol.1)	August 29, 2008
Prologue: Using his Psychogun, Cobra takes care of three bounty hunters in an alley who plan to capture him. On the planet Mars, scantily dressed Professor Utopia Moore examines the remains of a fossil snail and sand whale skeleton. In New York, Cobra visits the Ancient Martian Art Gallery and research center dressed as a minister. Once inside he proceeds to steal a heavily protected diamond. Meanwhile Professor Moore examines her fossil snail data from Mars. Just as Cobra is about to steal the diamond two Pirate Guild space ships materialize in the walls of the building and begin attacking and killing the staff. Their leader, Gypsy Doc, confronts Professor Moore and demands the fossil snail data, but Cobra rescues her and they make their way to the rooftop. Just as they are about to escape in a helicopter, Cobra loses the diamond and the pilot is shot. She accuses him of being a thief but he still manages to get them both to safety. Intrigued why the Pirate Guild want the fossil snail data, Cobra intercepts Professor Moore when her research crew return to Mars.
2	"The Psychogun Episode 2"; Transliteration: "Kobura Za Saikogan, Vol. 2" (Japanese: コブラ ザ・サイコガンvol.2)	October 24, 2008
Professor Moore agrees to take Cobra with her research expedition onto the surface of planet Mars. They find a live fossil snail in the gap between to gills and the epidermis of a sand whale which they take back to their spaceship. Her examination of the snail shows that it is 3.75 billion years old, and that the growth rings of its shell forms a historical record that contains the secrets of the galaxy. She also reveals that she knows about his reputation. Outside, a transparent skeletal figure (Crystal Boy) approaches the ship, searching for Professor Moore. He defeats the guards and a group of shrouded figures then enter the camp, kill the crew and destroy the spaceship. Cobra and Professor Moore manage to escape on a mechanical horse. She tells him that the code inscribed on the shell is ancient Martian writing of the history of the galaxy, and its birth – a living history. She is carrying on the work of her father who was murdered by the Pirate Guild. They arrive at a mechanical walking castle and are welcomed by the autocratic Count Cliff Bold. Cobra is suspicious so he investigates the castle and finds a bathhouse filled with beautiful women wearing skimpy bikinis, remaining still & frozen in various poses. A small drone hovers around a bikini clad woman, drawing out a syringe from its inside & injecting the drug lodo in her. This drug is what keeping the women frozen & preserved for good from an unknown amount of time – rendering them forever youthful, immortal and inert and solid like a statue. Knowing that nothing can be changed at all, Cobra leaves the women trapped in their fates for good & proceeds only to find figures similar to those who attacked the research spaceship.
3	"The Psychogun Episode 3"; Transliteration: "Kobura Za Saikogan, Vol. 3" (Japanese: コブラ ザ・サイコガンvol.3)	December 21, 2008
Cobra finds the mark of the Pirate Guild in Count Cliff Bold's castle. He returns to find the Pirate Guild assassin Crystal Boy in Professor Utopia Moore's quarters. Cobra manages to evade him, use a dead guard as a counterweight to lift himself over a railing. He finds Utopia and they escape in a stolen vehicle. Count Cliff Bold sends mechanical pterodactyls in pursuit who shoot down their vehicle. Utopia uses her shock-boots to summon a sand whale on which they escape. The Pirate Guild Commander of the Solar System District Redborn tells Count Cliff Bold to provide the fossil snail data soon or face the consequences. Cobra and Utopia are knocked off the flying whale in a forest and come across some ancient temple ruins which are actually the Gypsy Doc headquarters. Cobra pretends to have Utopia prisoner and is welcomed by Gypsy Doc and is taken back to the castle.After the party at night, Cobra takes a walk behind the castle in the forest. Meanwhile, he watches as a goblin like species drags a very scantily dressed beautiful & voluptuous dead young woman by one leg & takes her within a bag like nest with it. Inside the bag, the goblin begins its work on her body. Although her body was still essentially intact & unchanged within the bag since human body takes some significant amount of time to start dissolving but she was already dead. Knowing that nothing can be done for her, Cobra leaves the woman's fate sealed in the bag with the goblin & instead shoots down three bags carrying the duck engineers & discovers that the duck-like engineers who made the dimension-shift ship for Gypsy Doc, and locals kidnapped by his men, are being fed to 'bag-worms', who dissolve living things to produce a powerful drug named 'Lodo'. Cobra then tries to shoot at the bag containing the woman whose body is still likely visually intact for rescue since the 'bag-worms' take significantly longer time to even start digesting human bodies but unfortunately Gypsy Doc arrives and reveals himself to be Count Cliff Bold, leaving the poor woman inside the bag despite her intact form. He immobilizes Cobra with a time-bullet, shoots him with a metal spike, then forces Utopia to hand over the crystal pendant around her neck containing the fossil snail data to save Cobra.
4	"The Psychogun Episode 4"; Transliteration: "Kobura Za Saikogan, Vol. 4" (Japanese: コブラ ザ・サイコガンvol.4)	February 27, 2009
Cobra still alive and uses the Psychogun on Count Cliff Bold, but is too weak for it to be effective, and is dumped into an underground canal. The duck-like engineers jump in to save him, but at the last moment, Lady Armaroid arrives with Cobra's ship and rescues him with the engineers. The engineers work to modify his ship's engine to dimension-shift. Meanwhile Count Cliff Bold uses his dimension-shift ships to descend 2,000m below the Mars surface to a cave housing an ancient Martian city. He explains that the Martians were a powerful culture that travelled the galaxy, were known on Earth as Moai and had the power to create galaxies using a galactic egg. The engineers complete the dimension-shift engine and Lady Armaroid pursues Count Cliff Bold. During the chase, Cobra recovers and manages to enter Count Cliff Bold's ship. Cobra defeats him and rescues Utopia, but is confronted by Crystal Boy. Utopia knocks Crystal Boy onto a power generator, and although he attacks Cobra again, his crystal body has become brittle and Cobra shatters him into tiny crystals. As they depart they are confronted by the Pirate Guild Commander who wants the galactic egg. They decide to activate the egg, which destroys the Guild fleet, but avoid being destroyed themselves by using Count Cliff Bold's time-gun. Together they watch the birth of a new galaxy.
5	"Time Drive Episode 1"; Transliteration: "Kobura Taimu Doraibu, Vol. 1" (Japanese: コブラ タイムドライブvol.1)	April 24, 2009
Cobra and Lady arrive at the Time Palace and meet Scheherazade, the dream spinner. Lady is fading and Cobra wants to find a solution before she fades away. Scheherazade creates a time-partition and they both dive into the times-stream that is Lady's past. They see the time before Cobra had his face changed and when Lady was human. They see when she was dying from a bullet wound and the only solution to save her was to assimilate her into live-metal, and she was reborn as Armaroid Lady. They travel back to the limit of 20 years, but Cobra pushes past the limit to travel further back in time to when he first met Lady. He sees a woman, Layla was being taken to Lord Giros' floating castle during his coronation as a gift. Cobra hitches a ride, on the delivery vehicle and arrives at the castle, where his earlier self was planning to steal treasures. During the ceremony a beautiful dancer attacks Lord Giro, but is stopped by his bodyguard, Manidou, a dark sword-master. She's Princess Esmeralda of Sanborn, but her assassination attempt fails and she is taken prisoner and given to Nuba, a science wizard. Cobra appears to Layla in his older form, claiming to be his own older brother Joe Gillian and helps her escape. Meanwhile the past Cobra tries to get to the treasure but is detected and has to escape, pursued by Manidou who badly wounds him. As Nuba considers his plans for Princess Esmeralda, Joe Gillian arrives, rescues her and they are picked up by Paloma.
6	"Time Drive Episode 2"; Transliteration: "Kobura Taimu Doraibu, Vol. 2" (Japanese: コブラ タイムドライブvol.2)	June 26, 2009
Manidou suspects Layla of being a traitor, and Lord Giros gives her to Nuba for experimentation. Lost and wounded, Cobra is healed by forest spirits. Paloma takes Joe Gillian and Princess Esmeralda to her home where he reveals that he's Cobra from the future and has come to save her, and calls her Lady. They are attacked by Lord Giros' assassins who kill Paloma. Princess Esmeralda escapes and Joe Gillian tells her to find his younger self who will protect her. Manidou enters the living forest looking for Cobra. Princess Esmeralda finds the swordsmith Mizuna who her father said would help and he gives her a magical sword, but she is captured by Lord Giros's machines. Cobra manages to defeat Manidou and makes his way back to the castle and the treasure room where he sees a naked woman in a glass case—Esmeralda. Cobra kisses her and she wakes, realizing that he is the younger version of Cobra. Giros arrives and grabs Esmeralda, but before he can kill Cobra, he is shot by a Psychogun blast from a distance – Cobra from the future. Still not dead, Esmeralda throws her Black Hole Diamond at Giros and he and his entire castle are consumed by it. Back in the present, Cobra realizes that a homing device planted on her by Manidou is taking Armaroid Lady back into the black hole, and he goes in after her. He destroys the homing device, and together he and Esmeralda destroy Lord Giros and return to the present.

=== Part 2: TV series ===
This series features story arcs of one to four episodes each of Cobra saving the world, his friends or himself.

No. overall	No. in season	Crunchyroll title Original Japanese title	Story Arc	Original airdate
7	1	"The Key of Shiva"; Transliteration: "Shiba no Kagi" (Japanese: シバの鍵)	Key of Shiva	January 2, 2010
On Christmas Day, two Pirate Guild pterodactyl fighter planes are tracking a truck on the ground. In the truck, a woman called Secret and a man are delivering the Key of Shiva to the space port 300 km away. The truck drives into a tunnel and crashes into Cobra who is driving towards them. Secret gives the key to Cobra asking him to deliver it to Professor Toporo on planet Galon. Cobra shoots down one of the attacking space ships, but is badly injured. They are rescued by the Highway Patrol and taken to hospital where his body starts healing at an amazing rate. He thinks Secret reminds him of Dominique. Pirate Guild operatives enter her room, but Cobra intervenes and kills them, and captures female Pilot Blackborn who says that Secret is in the Galaxy Patrol. Zoros, an almost indestructible figure in a golden ram's head mask attacks Cobra, but he survives and agrees to help Secret deliver the Key of Shiva. Secret explains that Galon is a huge planet that is heading for the sun and the impact could destroy the solar system. It is an artificial planet with a drive system that must be activated with the Key of Shiva to change course. They travel to Galon and land at the excavation site where they are met by mysterious figures wearing domed helmets.
8	2	"The Golden Gate"; Transliteration: "Ōgon no Tobira" (Japanese: 黄金の扉)	Key of Shiva	January 9, 2010
Professor Toporo explains that the mysterious figures accompanying him are Martian cave dwellers helping with the excavation. He theory is that the planet was a giant spaceship constructed by the ancient Galonians for their god Shiva who travelled the galaxy. Queen Shiva searched for a Golden Paradise but the Galonians were wiped out along the journey. It appears that someone recently activated the planet drive unit. The professor's party enter the ruined temple and arrive at the Golden Gate. Before handing over the key, Cobra realises that the professor and helpers are actually Pirate Guild operatives and kills them. Pilot Blackborn and Zoros attack Cobra and Secret. Blackborn melts the key and captures Secret, saying the Pirate Guild's plan is to crash Galon into the sun and destroy the galaxy. Zoros chases Cobra into an underground waterway, but Cobra finally manages to destroy him after Humanhead Sharks strip off his protective bandages. A sentient Humanhead Shark frees Secret and tells her that her own body is the key to the Golden Gate. She steps forward into the figure of a woman carved into the gateway.
9	3	"The Starless City"; Transliteration: "Hoshi no nai Machi" (Japanese: 星のない街)	Key of Shiva	January 16, 2010
Secret opens the Golden Gate and the Humanhead Shark tells Cobra to find the control system under a winged lion. Cobra and Secret find the control mechanism, but trigger a gravity barrier. Cobra tries to force his way forward, but falls through a trapdoor and finds himself in a foreign city with amnesia. He rescues a beautiful woman, Bonny, from some thugs out to collect on a loan from their boss Bogard. She proposes that they make some money together using his powerful punch. She offers Bogard a deal to repay her debt by entering Cobra in a fight club contest. Bogard pits him against Mohammad, the unbeaten champion. Cobra wins in three punches and the debt is repaid. When Cobra notices that there are no stars in the sky, Bonny explains that they are in an underground city on Galon. History says the Galonians were almost wiped out 3,000 years ago by biological warfare and the survivors escaped underground. Sights of the winged lion statue above prompts his some of Cobra's memories. Bogard's bodyguard offers Cobra a contest with Garcia, the man who killed Bonny's brother in a dirty fight – he accepts. Before the fight a girl kisses Cobra and bites him on the lip. When the fight begins, Cobra feels paralyzed, cannot fight back and takes a heavy beating.
10	4	"The Ghost of the Golden Paradise"; Transliteration: "Ōgon Kyō no Bōrei" (Japanese: 黄金郷の亡霊)	Key of Shiva	January 23, 2010
Cobra looks likely to lose the fight, because the woman who kissed and bit him used a paralysis drug, the same as was used on Bonny's brother. Cobra fears he will die here, not knowing who he is, but steels himself and defeats Garcia with one mighty blow. Memories come flooding back to Cobra and he remembers who he is, and his mission. He heads for the planet's propulsion power plant, taking Bonny with him. They arrive and Bonny helps him rescue Secret who has been trapped under the gravity barrier for more than a day. Because of the gravity barrier, he cannot reach the switch nor use his Psychogun, however Bonny knows the location of the central control unit. They reach it, but access is difficult as it is over 30m below them. Bonny tell the story of Midora, a woman who threw herself down onto it a month ago. Cobra suspects that this restarted it, directing the planet towards the sun. Midora, now part of the machine tries to stop them from reaching the circuits below as her desire for suicide has been transferred to the central control unit. She uses illusions to stop Cobra from accessing the controls, but he uses the Psychogun to destroy her body, thus shutting down the propulsion power plant and preventing the plant's destruction.
11	5	"Legend of the Wandering Beauties"; Transliteration: "Samayoeru Bijo no Densetsu" (Japanese: さまよえる美女の伝説)	Legend of the Wandering Beauties	January 30, 2010
Treasure hunter Johnny retrieves a jewel ring from underwater but his boat is attacked and destroyed in an explosion. Cobra arranged to meet Johnny at the port, but no-one has seen him since he went near Baron Island. No fishermen will take him there, and a local boat captain tells him the ocean nearby is cursed with undersea wandering beauties. For a high price, he offers to take Cobra there in his old boat the next day. He tells Cobra that Johnny used to hang out at the Angel Kiss bar, owned by Baccus. At the bar, Baccus says Johnny had apparently found some treasure at sea, but others were also searching for it. Later that night, Cobra is held up by a member of the gang that killed Johnny but he kills him. In the morning he meets history student Ellis Lloyd who is also going to Baron Island. They find the captain murdered, so take the boat out themselves. They arrive at the island that 2,000 years ago had a flourishing civilization that apparently used to drown virgins dressed in precious jewellery and revealing outfits as offering to the gods. They dive and find Johnny, his boat, the ancient ring he'd found and coordinates of the treasure. While underwater they are attacked by another member of the gang, but Cobra kills him too. They head to the location and two more gang members follow them. At the site, Cobra and Ellis find the wandering beauties, their bodies unchanged because of an over-extremely cold water current. The cold current kept the fishes away from feeding on them, thus for 2000 years they have remained the same, with their unchanged dead bodies wandering the island in a circular path. On boarding the boat, Cobra is attacked, and kills two of the gang, but is surprised to find that Ellis is their leader. When Ellis dives into the water, wearing her two piece swimsuit, Cobra kills her, and her corpse joins the underwater procession of wandering beauties. Destined to circle around the island along the over-extremely cold current of water, Ellis's body will remain unchanged like the other drowned beauties & remain with them forever.
12	6	"Climbing Mt. Kagero"; Transliteration: "Kagerō Yama Nobori" (Japanese: カゲロウ山登り)	Mt. Kagero	February 6, 2010
A passenger plane carrying 20 tons of gold bars is blown up in mid air and crashes into a mountain killing the passengers and crew. Search parties found no trace of the plane, and no mountain exists in the area. During a snow storm, in a remote cabin, a group of eight strangers wait for a ferry and discuss the legend about Mt. Kagero that is said to appear every ten years. Cobra enters, calling himself Johnson, the group are; Father Sebastian, fur trader Jack, fishermen siblings Daisy and Bucky, explorer Leo, Linda Windsor and bodyguard Frank, and ferry owner Geronimo. However Cobra knows them as Leo the Killer, Crazy Mouse sibling thieves and con-man Lucky Jack. Linda Windsor acknowledges that they are all after the gold. Even though the storm hasn't abated Geronimo takes them out in his boat and they agree to split the gold 8 ways. Eventually, through the flying snow they see Mt. Kagero, but a violent wave throws them into the sea. They use handy-jets to escape the water and get to the mountain base, but are attacked by snow sharks along the way. All except Frank make it to safety. Geronimo is leading the difficult climb up the mountain when a huge block of ice and rock falls towards them.
13	7	"To the Summit"; Transliteration: "Sanchō e" (Japanese: 山頂へ)	Mt. Kagero	February 13, 2010
Cobra uses a piton to split the icy rock falling towards them and an exploding cigar to divert the following avalanche, saving the group. Exhausted, Bucky ceases to believe in the mountain so it disappears and he falls to his death. That night Linda tries to seduce Cobra but fails. During the night Daisy's barrier-tent is sabotaged and she freezes to death. Linda reveals Cobra's identity and con-man Lucky Jack tries to kill him, but Cobra kills him instead. Cobra reveals that Father Sebastian is really Bull's-eye. They shelter from the storm in crevices. Later, Father Sebastian is founded hanged, and Linda is missing. She left to reach the summit alone, but hears a mechanical voice saying the mountain is an illusion and falls to her death. The rope holding Leo is cut by a mechanical arm and he falls but is saved. They all hear a voice saying the mountain is an illusion. Leo listens and falls to his death. Cobra then realizes the traitor is Father Sebastian, a cyborg. Sebastian then cuts Cobra's lifeline, but Cobra doesn't fall far. Father Sebastian reaches the summit, finding the wreckage and the gold, however Cobra also arrives and confronts him. Father Sebastian admits that he planted the bomb on the plane which gives Cobra reason to kill him. Only Geronimo remains – his reason for the climb being to prove his father had also reached the summit, but died there. Cobra's reason, Armaroid Lady was on the plane. He finds her just before her systems shut down completely. They depart, leaving the gold behind them.
14	8	"Mandrad"; Transliteration: "Mandorado" (Japanese: マンドラド)	Mandrad	February 20, 2010
Cobra stops at an entertainment space station and encounters Bonny who now has her own bar. In the bar he meets a woman who has been waiting a week to see him. She introduces herself as Elizabeth Tucker who requests his help. He cannot refuse as she has Secret trapped in a prison. He travels with her to planet Nazca with three other men, The Eyes, The Ears and The Nose. She wants to find the seeds of a plant called Mandrad that has a human face, and when it matures has diamond teeth. They arrive on Nazca and find a Mandrad over 2,000 years old. To reach its seeds they must travel through a dark swamp where the specialist skills of Cobra's three companions prove useful in avoiding the deadly inhabitants such as jet-piranha and exploding mushrooms. On the way, The Nose and The Eyes do not survive. They reach a seed pod but The Ears gets greedy and is shot by a seed, which grows and blooms into a Mandrad plant with diamond teeth – they need human bodies to grow. Cobra returns with a bag of seeds, but Elizabeth Tucker plans to kill him. However when she opens the bag, one fires into her body, killing her, growing a new plant, and freeing Secret.
15	9	"The Black Bullet"; Transliteration: "Kuroi Dangan" (Japanese: 黒い弾丸)	The Black Bullet	February 27, 2010
Cobra enters a car race and competes against the reigning champion Pamela Lee. He wins the race but crashes his machine into a tunnel. Everyone thinks he's dead, but he changes to a tuxedo suit and walks away. Later, he appears at a bar and meets Pamela Lee who is unsurprised that he survived the crash. She tells him that during the race, power was cut and a thief stole $4 million from the vault. Cobra disagrees, saying it was only $3.5 million. She asks him to stop the Black Bullet. While in the bathroom she screams and disappears out the window. Later Cobra is arrested after stopping a runaway police car, apparently controlled by the Black Bullet. The lady police officer explains that the super fast and armour plated Black Bullet has destroyed more than 100 cars and 200 people. Police manage to trap the Black Bullet but it escapes, and is unaffected by Cobra's Psychogun. Cobra meets the inventor of the Black Bullet which he says he made for Pamela. But after her sister died in a care accident, Pamela developed a split personality and an extreme hatred of all vehicles. Cobra sets a trap for Pamela and the Black Bullet which sees them both destroyed.
16	10	"Galaxy Knights"; Transliteration: "Gyarakushī Naitsu" (Japanese: ギャラクシー・ナイツ)	Shiva Castle	March 6, 2010
In a town called Gizla, a group of characters receive invitations to recapture Shiva Castle. The Shiva royal family was wiped out by the Chaos Army 20 years ago. They have a slim chance of success to kill the Chaos king, and even less of returning alive. The invitations also contained the mission plans and a spade playing card. They decide to use the card numbers as their identities. The Queen of Spades is a professional killer. She quickly identifies two others as Chaos agents and kills them. Cobra is the last to join the group, holding the Ace. Suddenly a hoard of Chaos Beast Mechas attack and only four of the original group survive, escaping on the roof of a train. A man called King is trapped in a prison. To maintain his sanity, his soul mate the fairy Ellis is kept in a nearby cell. He is to be the thirteenth member and their guide. To complete the mission, they must rescue him from a slave trader's mansion. The Queen of Spades enters his mansion alone in a cocktail dress instead of her battle attire.
17	11	"The Thirteenth Man"; Transliteration: "Jū Sannin-me no Otoko" (Japanese: 13人目の男)	Shiva Castle	March 13, 2010
The Queen of Spades enters slave trader Zaru's mansion by the front door, while the other members of the team enter by other means; Cobra the Ace, the Jack of Spades, and the Seven and Eight, a two headed cyborg. Cobra is attacked by a Zoraian prisoner and kills him, so he has to take his place in a fighting match. His opponent is a giant green Guldonian, Hercules of the Hell Desert, but he fells him with one punch. The Guldonian is then fed to a sea creature. His next opponent is King, the one he came to rescue. During the fight Cobra explains his mission and they agree to fight until the others create a diversion. When the diversion starts, they escape into a cavern. On the way, Seven releases the prisoners who take their revenge on Zaru.
18	12	"The Devil of the Temple"; Transliteration: "Shinden no Mamono" (Japanese: 神殿の魔物)	Shiva Castle	March 20, 2010
Using Zaru's submarine, they travel to the island of Shiva Castle, a place where Cobra has been before. They arrive at the town of Saldora and Fairy Forest, Ellis' birthplace. They encounter a frog race who are against Chaos. They seek a temple which has an underground waterway to the castle. Unfortunately it is closed, so Ellis uses her powers to find a way to open it. Meanwhile Seven and Eight continue bickering – they are husband and wife entities inhabiting the same cyborg body. While Seven sleeps, Eight tries to form an alliance with Cobra, and tells how they were once safe-crackers, but after an explosion destroyed their bodies, they can only exist within the cyborg. Ellis is captured and King rushes off alone to rescue her so the others follow. They split up to find King, but they find he was captured and taken to the temple. In the temple, Ellis is about to be sacrificed, so Cobra gets Seven and Eight to create a diversion so he can initiate a rescue. They manage to rescue Ellis, but the doorway to the waterway requires human blood to open. They slay the head priest, Engola, whose blood triggers the doorway, but behind it is an energy dragon holding King. They free King and head to the basement, but are met by Chaos Beast Mechas. They fight their way to the submarine, followed by the Mechas, but the frog race partisans come to their rescue. King is badly wounded, but slowly starts to regain some memories.
19	13	"Distant Memories"; Transliteration: "Harukanaru Kioku" (Japanese: 遥かなる記憶)	Shiva Castle	March 27, 2010
King's remembers when he was King of Shiva with Queen Romila and the Chaos armada of spaceships attacked the castle with superior weaponry. Chaos was assisted by a figure with a left arm gun who shot at him, killing his wife – the group suspect it was Cobra. They confront Cobra about the past, but before he can answer, he is attacked by the energy dragon. The Queen of Spades fires and Cobra and the dragon fall into a pit below. The dragon dissipates in the water, and Cobra finds what look like the mother ship of the Chaos army with a large glowing sphere at its center. The others open the vault and find untold treasures which the Queen of Spades claims it as her own. She shoots Seven and Eight, then kills the Jack of Spades with a gun attached to her left arm. She admits she is a Chaos Trooper and that it was she who shot King in the past, but before she can fire at him, Cobra shoots her with his Psychogun. He had suspected her from the beginning and as the sender of the invitations. The energy dragon reappears and absorbs the Queen of Spades – it manipulates the Chaos Troops and absorbs the life force and knowledge of its victims. Before it can attack him, Cobra detonates an explosive that destroys the Chaosian life support sphere, ending their colonization plans. Cobra only takes a large ruby necklace for his trouble and leaves, giving it to Eight, forlorn as her husband Seven had died. King sees a wanted posted for Cobra with his old face and realizes that he was a thief whose life he spared many years ago.

== See also ==
- List of Space Cobra episodes
