= List of The Mysterious Cities of Gold characters =

This is a list of characters in the animated series The Mysterious Cities of Gold and its 2012 continuation of the same name.

== Primary characters ==
=== Esteban ===
Esteban (エステバン,, Esuteban) (voiced by Shiraz Adam (English), Masako Nozawa (Japanese)): An orphan who was rescued at sea as a young child by the Spanish navigator Mendoza, he wears one of the two sun medallions. He dreams of adventure and is very impulsive. Esteban has a fear of heights which is confounded by the people of Barcelona who believe him to be the "Child of the Sun" and hoist him up high at the port to call out the sun to aid the departing ships. He joins the Spaniards in their search for one of The Seven Cities of Gold in the New World, hoping to find his father. Upon meeting a friend of his father in China, Esteban is revealed to be a descendant of the civilization of Atlantis, the ancient enemy of the Mu (Hiva) empire.

=== Zia ===
Zia (シア,, Shia) (voiced by Janice Chaikelson (English), Mami Koyama (Japanese)): The daughter of an Incan high priest, she was kidnapped from Peru by the Spanish invaders and given as a present to the Queen of Spain. She met Esteban when she was taken by Governor Pizarro who wanted her to read the golden quipu. Zia wears a sun medallion like Esteban's, with an interlocking sun and moon disc.

=== Tao ===
Tao (タオ) (voiced by Adrian Knight (English), Junko Hori (Japanese)): The last living descendant of the sunken empire of Mu (Hiva in the season one English dub), he lived alone on the Galápagos Islands following the death of his father. Initially he is evasive to the others' company when they wash up on his island, but when the ship Solaris was revealed he joined them on their journey.

== Secondary characters ==
=== Supporting characters ===
- Kokapetl (グイン, Guin) (voiced by Vlasta Vrána (English)): Tao's pet parrot who interjects conversations every so often and warns the group of danger. Kokapetl was named Pichu in the French version.
- Juan Carlos Mendoza (voiced by Howard Ryshpan (English), Isao Sasaki (Japanese), Bruno Magne (French, Seasons 2 and 3)): A Spaniard and navigator for the Spanish fleet, he rescued an infant Esteban from a shipwreck during one of his voyages. An experienced sailor and navigator, Mendoza places himself in the role of a leader. It is not always clear, however, where his loyalties lie and as such he is often at odds with the other characters. He is accompanied by fellow sailors, Sancho and Pedro. Mendoza has spent many years searching for information about the Mysterious Cities of Gold.
- Sancho (voiced by Terrence Labrosse (English), Takeshi Aono (Japanese)): Portly associate of Mendoza, Sancho is a bit slow and stutters a lot. He and Pedro frequently tend to get into trouble together, usually when their greed gets the better of them. As such, they act as comic relief for the majority of the series. Although both he and Pedro complain frequently, they are loyal to Mendoza and follow him despite their constant misgivings.
- Pedro (voiced by Michael Rudder (English), Kaneta Kimotsuki (Japanese)): Skinny and loud-mouthed associate of Mendoza, Pedro is very cautious and easily scared, but can often be swayed into action by the promise of gold. Despite his cowardice Pedro engages often in battles, usually teamed with Sancho.
- Papacamayo: Zia's father and the chief of the Mayan Village of the New Sun.
- Atanos (The High Priest): Esteban's father and the High Priest, he is the guardian of the City of Gold and keeper of the Great Library. Mendoza knows he is Esteban's father but did not tell Esteban so to not cause him grief. Also known elsewhere as 'The Travelling Prophet', prior to taking up the position of High Priest at the first city, he traveled the Earth in search of more information regarding the seven cities of gold. He was thought to have perished in the final episode of Season 1, but was revealed to have survived in Season 2.

=== Antagonists ===
- Commander Gomez (voiced by Matt Birman (English), Goro Naya (Japanese)): Greedy and vicious commander of the Spanish armed forces who is ruthless in his task of serving Governor Pizarro and the pursuit of Esteban and Zia.
- Captain Gaspard (voiced by A.J. Henderson (English), Kenji Utsumi (Japanese)): A loyal subordinate of Señor Gomez, he is the Captain of the Guard, commanding a large number of Spanish soldiers. He is uncouth and rather unintelligent but has a firm command of his troops and is physically very strong. In the long term, gold and loyalty to Gomez are the only things that interest him. He was thought to have died with Gomez in the destruction of cities, but was revealed to be alive in Season 3.
- Governor Pizarro (voiced by Maurice Podbrey (English), Katsunosuke Hori (Japanese)): Pizarro is the appointed governor of the entire invaded region of South America. He commands the Spanish invasion forces, including Señor Gomez and Captain Gaspard. He is a ruthless and avaricious despotic commander who holds little value for others' lives unless they serve to aid his purpose.
- Menator (voiced by Richard Dumont (English), Tamio Ōki (Japanese)): Aging leader of the Olmec race, he plans to use the technology of the Cities of Gold to harness the power of the Sun and save the Olmec race from extinction.
- Kalmec (voiced by Dean Hagopian (English), Tesshō Genda (Japanese)): Second-in-command of the Olmecs, he is in charge of the Olmec army and the defense of the Mountain of the Burning Shield. He is treacherous and merciless, believing in the total supremacy of the Olmecs.
- The Doctor (voiced by Walter Massey (English), Shunsuke Shima (Japanese)): A Spanish doctor whose real name is Fernando Laguerra, he seems to specialize in poisons. He is searching for the Cities of Gold together with Marinche and Tetiola.
- Marinche (voiced by Jane Woods (English), Rihoko Yoshida (Japanese)): Guide and adviser to The Doctor, she is rarely seen without the huge Tetiola, her loyal and protective slave of whom she is very fond, more so than she is of The Doctor. She appears to be a great influence on The Doctor, often manipulating him into doing things he otherwise would not do in pursuit of the Cities of Gold.
- Zarès/Ambrosius (voiced by Pierre-Alain de Garrigues): A French alchemist who seeks to find the Cities of Gold.
- Isabella Laguerra (voiced by Céline Melloul): The sword-wielding daughter of Fernando Laguerra, introduced in Season 3, she acts as a henchwoman for Zarès, but helps the children on several occasions. She develops a rivalry with Mendoza and eventually falls in love with him.

== Recurring characters ==
The series features a wide range of secondary characters which the primary characters meet along their journey through the Americas and Asia.

=== Spaniards ===
- Alvarez: Soldier of the Spanish army under Pizarro's command.
- Andreas: Another of Pizarro's soldiers.
- Father Rodriguez: Spanish priest in Barcelona, who adopted Esteban, he died the day before the ship Esperanza left for the New World.
- Lucas: A Captain in Pizarro's army.
- Perez: Captain of the Esperanza.

=== Amazons ===
- The Amazon Queen: A wise and just ruler who wishes to live in peace.
- Omoru: The evil priestess of the rain god who plans to depose the Amazon Queen.
- Paula: An Amazon warrior who supports the Amazon Queen.
- Morca: The Queen's lady in waiting who tries to warn her about Omoru's treachery.
- Lauda: Another Amazon warrior, but who supports Omoru.

=== Incas ===
- Apo: An Inca wise man imprisoned along with many of his people by Governor Pizarro.
- Ketcha: A warrior of the High Peak.
- Illama: One of the children of the High Peak.
- Kraka: Chief of the city of the High Peak.
- Kiyun: An Inca prisoner in Pizarro's Fort.
- Luca and Shicomi: Two children of the High Peak who befriend Esteban, Zia and Tao.
- Myuca: An old story teller who knows many Inca legends.
- Pasha: Once a High Priest of the Cities of Gold, Pasha is imprisoned in his own temple by Pizarro.
- Telapa: A citizen of the High Peak.
- Tohawka: A young Inca who tries to escape from Pizarro.
- Upanki: Leader of the warriors of the Fort of the Black Eagle.
- Wayna: A warrior of the High Peak who is sent to guide and protect the children.
- Yacuma: A woman who looks after the children while they stay at the High Peak.

=== Mayas ===
- Myena: A young Maya girl who has no family, but who is taken in by Papacamayo.
- Wynacocha: Leads the warriors of the Village of the New Sun.
- Sheehol: Chief of a village neighboring the Village of the New Sun.

=== Chinese ===
- Wu: Chief of the Miao village.
- Zhi: A boy who befriends the children and leads them to the cave of the Sacred Drum.
- The Grand Master of Shaolin: The blind wise master of the Shaolin monastery in Central China who also is an expert at herbal medicines.
- Tian Li: A Shaolin monk who has mastered both kung fu and the reading of ancient texts.
- Yu Chunhe: The great priest of the Renaissance Temple in Peking.
- Jiajing Emperor: Eleventh emperor of the Ming dynasty who was also known as 'The Son of the Sky'.
- Prince Zhu: Son of the Emperor who longs to escape from the Forbidden City.
- Gurban: A Mongol youth who is also an expert horseman that encounters the children at the Great Wall of China.
- Li Shuang: Scholar and guardian of the sacred site 'The Stomach of Buddha' and was also friends with Estaban's father.

== See also ==
- List of The Mysterious Cities of Gold episodes
