= Heidi's Song =

1982 film by Robert Taylor

- Theatrical release poster
- Directed by: Robert Taylor
- Written by: Joseph Barbera; Robert Taylor; Jameson Brewer
- Based on: Heidi by Johanna Spyri
- Produced by: Joseph Barbera; William Hanna
- Starring: Lorne Greene; Sammy Davis Jr.; Margery Gray
- Cinematography: Jerry Mills
- Edited by: Greg V. Watson
- Music by: Hoyt Curtin
- Production company: Hanna-Barbera
- Distributed by: Paramount Pictures (North America); PSO International (international)
- Release date: November 19, 1982
- Running time: 94 minutes
- Country: United States
- Language: English
- Budget: $9 million
- Box office: $5,124,391

Heidi's Song is a 1982 American animated musical film produced by Hanna-Barbera Productions and based on the 1881 novel Heidi by Johanna Spyri. It was directed by Robert Taylor from a screenplay by Taylor, Joseph Barbera and Jameson Brewer, and stars Margery Gray as the title character, alongside the voices of Lorne Greene and Sammy Davis Jr..

The film was released on November 19, 1982, by Paramount Pictures. Its box office receipts were disappointing, attributed by Joseph Barbera to incompetent distribution; it was released in the same week as the animated features Bugs Bunny's 3rd Movie: 1001 Rabbit Tales and The Last Unicorn.

== Plot ==
An orphaned girl named Heidi is sent to live with her paternal grandfather by her maternal Aunt Dete, who has been looking after her since she was a baby. Her grandfather initially dislikes having her around because she interferes in his routine, but when he hurts his leg, she helps nurse him back to health, and during this time they bond together. Heidi meets the local goatherd, a boy named Peter, and often goes with him and the village's goats on their daily grazing trips higher up the Swiss Alps.

One day, however, Aunt Dete arrives to take Heidi away again, saying that a wealthy family in Frankfurt, wants her to come live with them. Her grandfather reluctantly lets her go. She arrives at the house in Frankfurt, where she learns she is supposed to become the companion of a wealthy but invalid girl named Klara. Her governess and guardian, Fräulein Rottenmeier, disapproves of Heidi's simple country ways, but Klara likes her and insists that she stay. She brings joy into Klara's life, especially when she gives her a basket of kittens as a present. When Fraulein Rottenmeier discovers them, she locks Heidi in the rat-infested basement.

Peter and the country animals come to Heidi's rescue. Together with Klara, they travel to the Wunderhorn without telling Fraulein Rottenmeier. At this time, Klara's father returns home after being away on business, and is angered that she has disappeared. He immediately leaves for the Wunderhorn, and this time Fraulein Rottenmeier and the butler, Sebastian, take the opportunity to flee.

The three children travel up the mountain, but Klara stops halfway so that Heidi can run on ahead without pushing her wheelchair. Heidi does so and is joyfully reunited with her grandfather. Back halfway down the mountain, Klara's kitten, Snowball, is attacked by a hawk. Klara crawls out of her wheelchair and uses a stick to fight off the hawk. She then discovers that she is able to stand. Her father arrives and together they celebrate her mobility and Heidi's return.

== Voice cast ==
- Lorne Greene as Grandfather
- Sammy Davis Jr. as Head Ratte
- Margery Gray as Heidi
- Michael Bell as Willie
- Peter Cullen as Gruffle
- Roger DeWitt as Peter
- Richard Erdman as Herr Sessman
- Fritz Feld as Sebastian
- Pamelyn Ferdin as Klara
- Joan Gerber as Fräulein Rottenmeier
- Virginia Gregg as Aunt Dete
- Janet Waldo as Tinette
- Frank Welker as Schnoddle and Hootie
- Michael Winslow as Mountain

== Music ==
Hoyt Curtin scored the film, while Sammy Cahn and Burton Lane wrote the songs.

Original songs performed in the film include:

No.	Title	Performer(s)	Length
1.	"Good at Making Friends"	Lorne Greene & Margery Gray
2.	"A Christmas-y Day"	Sandie Hall
3.	"An Armful of Sunshine"	Lorne Greene
4.	"Heidi"	Lorne Greene
5.	"She's a Nothing"	Joan Gerber & Fritz Feld
6.	"An Armful of Sunshine (Reprise)"	Michael Bell
7.	"Imagine"	Pamelyn Ferdin & Chorus
8.	"An Un-kind Word"	Margery Gray
9.	"That's What Friends Are For"	Roger DeWitt
10.	"Ode to a Rat"	Sammy Davis Jr.
11.	"That's What Friends Are For (Reprise)"	Chorus

== Critical reception ==
Film historian Leonard Maltin gave the film 1.5 out of a possible 4 stars, criticizing it for its "awkward" continuity, "lifeless" animation, and an "excessive" cuteness of the film's animal characters.

== Home media ==
Heidi's Song was first released on VHS in 1985 by Worldvision Home Video. GoodTimes Home Video (under their Kids Klassics label) re-released it on VHS in 1988. Turner Home Entertainment gave it one final VHS re-release in 1998. Warner Home Video released it to DVD-R for the first time on July 31, 2012, through Warner Archive.

== See also ==
- List of animated feature films of 1982
- 1982 in film
