= List of Space Cobra episodes =

This is the episode list of the 1980s anime series. For the 2000s series, see List of Cobra the Animation episodes.

The anime series Space Cobra (スペースコブラ, Supēsu Kobura) is based on the manga series of the same name written by Buichi Terasawa. The series is directed by Osamu Dezaki and produced by TMS Entertainment. Loosely based in the first eight volumes of the manga, the episodes follows Cobra, a spatial pirate, who enjoys an adventurous life along with his gynoid partner Armaroid Lady.

Space Cobra was broadcast between October 7, 1982, and May 19, 1983, on Fuji Television. On October 25, 2000, the episodes were released in eight DVD compilations as well as a DVD box set by Digital Site. Digital Site also released a later DVD box subtitled Genseki-ban (原石版; lit. 'Gemstone version') on October 25, 2002. The eight DVDs were later re-released by Happinet on August 29, 2008.

On January 15, 2013, Right Stuf announced they licensed the series to it release in North America. Nozomi Entertainment, a Right Stuf's publishing division, stated it would release the anime in two DVD sets; the first one was released on March 4, 2014, and the second is available since May 6, 2014.

The series use two pieces of theme music, an opening theme and ending theme: "Cobra" (コブラ, Kobura) and "Secret Desire" (シークレット・デザイアー, Shīkuretto Dezaiā) both by Yoko Maeno.

== Episode list ==
| No. | Nozomi Entertainment title Original Japanese title | Directed by | Written by | Story arc | Original release date |
|---|---|---|---|---|---|
| 1 | "Resurrection! The Psychogun!"; Transliteration: "Fukkatsu! Saikogan" (Japanese: 復活!サイコガン) | Directed by : Shunji Oga; Storyboarded by : Makura Saki | Haruya Yamazaki | The Resurrection | October 7, 1982 |
It's Sunday and Johnson is bored and penniless. Ben, his faulty but cheap robot suggests he see a ‘Trip Movie', a system that projects stories into the client's brain. He dreams of his former life before his identity change as an independent space pirate who refused to join the Pirate Guild, and thus became their nemesis with a price on his head. Afterwards, he goes to a casino and surprisingly wins at roulette. He is invited to meet the casino's director who he recognizes as the space pirate Vaiken, whose eye he shot out five years ago as Cobra. Vaiken’s henchmen take Johnson to the basement for execution because of his winnings, but as they are about to shoot him, the Psychogun fires automatically and kills them. After he returns to his apartment, Johnson's memories of himself as Cobra come flooding back just as Vaiken and his henchmen arrive. With his Cobra skills and assistance of Lady Armaroid (who had been inside his robot), he defeats them and Vaiken retreats. With memory of his past life fully restored, he has a final showdown with Vaiken and destroys him.
| 2 | "The Mysterious Zygoba!"; Transliteration: "Kikai! Jigoba" (Japanese: 奇怪!ジゴバ) | Directed by : Shunji Oga; Storyboarded by : Yuji Matsushima | Kosuke Miki | Zygoba | October 14, 1982 |
A woman followed by three armed men collapses at Cobra's garage door. Cobra takes her in and kills the men. Cobra catches her spying on him so she tells him that her sister is being held by a slave trader and Guild member named Zygoba who forced her to spy on the Psychogun for him. With the film of the Psychogun schematics taken by the woman Vivi already in his possession, Zygoba orders reproductions to be made. Vivi tells Cobra that the reptilian Zygoba has modified his body so that he can pass through solid objects. Cobra, Lady and Vivi fly to Zygoba's island hideout where Cobra has to dodge fire from Zygoba's men with their version of his Psychogun. He beats them because he can bend his Psychogun beam. He enters Zygoba's hideout and finds many women in a magnetic hibernation system and leaves Lady to free them. He finds Zygoba who uses his ability to elude Cobra, hoping that Cobra will exhaust himself and the Psychogun. However Cobra uses his specialist skills to detect Zygoba's location without seeing him and kills him, earning not only the gratitude of Vivi, but also of the other women who were imprisoned.
| 3 | "Archenemy! Crystal Bowie"; Transliteration: "Shukuteki! Kurisutaru Bōi" (Japanese: 宿敵!クリスタル・ボーイ) | Directed by : Shunji Oga; Storyboarded by : Makura Saki | Haruya Yamazaki | The Three Sisters | October 21, 1982 |
In a bar on Tugsard, Cobra offends then insults Dogg, who he kills in self defence. Before the other patrons can react, a female bounty hunter enters and kills them - they are all wanted criminals with prices on their heads. After Cobra leaves she realizes that one criminal was shot by the stranger at the bar. Cobra visits own own grave at the cemetery. She arrives and confronts him, suspecting he knows the whereabouts of Cobra, or be Cobra himself. Suddenly they are attacked and captured by the Pirate Guild Killer Section, including their boss, Crystal Bowie. They identify her as bounty hunter Jane Royal. Cobra is allowed to leave, but when the attack him, he uses the Psychogun, so his identity is revealed. Cobra takes Jane Royal into a hidden passage within the cemetery to his headquarters and his space ship, Turtle. She reveals that she is one of Nelson's triplet daughters who have parts of the map to his treasure tattooed on their backs. They leave Tugsard but Turtle is suddenly attacked by a Guild fleet led by Crystal Bowie who wants the map. After defeating the Guild force, Jane asks for Cobra's help to find her sisters. He agrees and they head for planet Sid where Jane's sister Catherine lives.
| 4 | "Escape!! Sid Prison"; Transliteration: "Dassō!! Shido Keimusho" (Japanese: 脱走!!シド刑務所) | Directed by : Shunji Oga; Storyboarded by : Makura Saki | Kosuke Miki | The Three Sisters | October 28, 1982 |
Cobra and Jane Royal go to Sid to rescue her sister Catherine. She is a teacher at Massibilgi but she has been taken to the flying Sid Penitentiary, commanded by Director Schulz. and his offsider Sirgan. Jane Royal has Cobra arrested so he is taken to the prison, but she is then captured by Crystal Bowie. On the prison ship, Cobra sees prisoners punished by two huge gynoids. He escapes and is caught by the gynoids, but he defeats them both. Crystal Bowie visits Schulz and accuses him of betraying the Guild by keeping a woman that they want. However he offers and alliance as they each have one of the Royal sisters. Cobra finds Catherine in an underwater cell and they escape together. Following their escape, Crystal Bowie loses his patience with Schulz who completely underestimated Cobra, and kills him.
| 5 | "Mystery! Who is the Fearsome Sniper?"; Transliteration: "Nazo Kyōteki Sunaipā wa?" (Japanese: 謎!強敵スナイパーは?) | Directed by : Shunji Oga; Storyboarded by : Yuji Matsushima | Kosuke Miki | The Three Sisters | November 4, 1982 |
Cobra and Catherine head towards the Turtle, but a masked female sniper opens fire on them. During the pursuit, then find an abandoned village. Cobra acts as a decoy to allow Catherine to find shelter. The sniper is revealed to be remotely controlled by Tarvage, in the employ of Crystal Bowie. When almost at the Turtle, Catherine is shot and Cobra goes for help. He gets trapped in a mine, but finds a rock-melting machine and attacks the sniper. He disarms and unmasks her, and is surprised to see that it's Jane Royal, Catherine's sister, although she does not seem to be fully in control. She draws a gun and Cobra shots her.
| 6 | "The Magician's Identity!"; Transliteration: "Majutsushi no Shōtai!!" (Japanese: 魔術師の正体!!) | Shunji Oga | Haruya Yamazaki | The Three Sisters | November 11, 1982 |
On the Turtle, Jane lies unconscious, and Catherine lies in a coma. Crystal Bowie hires Zayee the informer to find Cobra. Cobra goes to a church to pray for the women, and is seen. When Zayee finds out, he decides to use his associates to catch Cobra for the reward. Tarvage wakes Jane using his brain control magic and commands her to kill Cobra. Jane releases a Hunter Snake, but it kills Zayee's associate Gus first. Cobra realizes Jane is under mind control, but Zayee fires a secret cannon, almost killing everyone. Duck, the only remaining member of the gang pledges allegiance to Cobra and says he knows the identity of the person controlling Jane, Tarvage the Magician. Back in the city, Duck meets Tarvage, who he sees implant seeds into night club dancers who then attack Cobra under his control. Cobra escapes with Duck and they return to the Turtle. Both Jane and Catherine are still in a critical condition. The seed that Tarvage planted into Jane is gradually taking over her nervous system and she is dying. Cobra joins their hands and they form a mental link, seeing each other mentally for the first time in 20 years. Catherine gives her remaining life force to Jane who then begins to recover.
| 7 | "Jane's Revenge!"; Transliteration: "Jiēn no Ada!" (Japanese: ジェーンの仇!) | Directed by : Shunji Oga; Storyboarded by : Hisao Nakanishi | Haruya Yamazaki | The Three Sisters | November 18, 1982 |
Crystal Bowie loses patience with Tarvage and gives him one last chance to catch Cobra. At Catherine's funeral, Jane wants revenge on Tarvage, but Cobra stops her. Then they are attacked by a storm of sharp seeds sent across the desert by the plant-man Tarvage that release an aesthetic and they fall unconscious. As Tarvage prepares to implant Cobra, Armaroid Lady attacks him but is no match for his armoured body. They fall and Tarvage's armour is broken, and before he can kill Lady, he succumbs to the desert heat and has to retreat. Cobra heads back into town to find Tarvage. Cobra finds him and fires a psycho-blast, but it is deflected by a shield created by his three floating satellites, killing Duck. Cobra lies in wait and manages to kill Tarvage at close range as he descends in a lift. When Cobra returns, Jane has gone. She confronts Crystal Bowie but her shots have no effect and she is mortally wounded. As she dies she sees a vision of Catherine, and their souls go to the third triplet, Dominique. Crystal Bowie sends all his troops after Cobra just as Cobra heads back to confront Crystal Bowie.
| 8 | "Fierce Battle! Cobra versus Bowie"; Transliteration: "Gekitō! Kobura tai Bōi" (Japanese: 激闘!コブラ対ボーイ) | Hideyoshi Oga | Kosuke Miki | The Three Sisters | November 25, 1982 |
Cobra is intercepted by Crystal Bowie's Gell-Fighters but using a radio-command air-bike as a decoy he destroys them, escaping with Lady in the Turtle. Cobra breaks into Crystal Bowie's headquarters, wondering why Crystal Bowie tried so hard to find a treasure that is not worth so much effort. Crystal Bowie doesn't answer, but uses his remaining troops the attack Cobra. Finally only Cobra and Crystal Bowie are left. Cobra finds his Psychogun is ineffective against Crystal Bowie's polarized glass crystalline body, but lead bullets work just fine. However bullets only have a temporary effect. In the final shoot-out Cobra manages to defeat Crystal Bowie.
| 9 | "Behold!! The Snow Gorilla Pirates!"; Transliteration: "Shutsugen!! Kaizoku Sunō Gorira" (Japanese: 出現!!海賊スノウ・ゴリラ) | Directed by : Shunji Oga; Storyboarded by : Tatsuya Matsuno | Kenji Terada | The Ultimate Weapon | December 2, 1982 |
Cobra consults a fortune teller to help find Dominique, the third triplet. She points to Lourouge the snow planet and the Snow Gorillas. Cobra and Lady travel to Lourouge and decide to catch a heavily guarded snow train they suspect of carrying gold. It is also carrying a suspicious passenger, Joe the tarantula, a Guild killer. The train is attacked by Snow Gorillas – women on skis. Cobra takes Joe's ID and meets the leader Sandra, handing her the microfilm message that Joe was carrying. Cobra is taken on a tour of their base, and he suspects his guide is Dominique as she looks like Jane. This is confirmed when he sees a similar tattoo on her back. Meanwhile Sandra decodes the message, identifying Dominique as Sargent Royal of the Galactic Patrol. She and two other Snow Gorillas are accused of being spies and are to be executed by robotic Piragators. Cobra's identity is revealed when he uses his Psychogun to destroy the Piragators.
| 10 | "The Tattoo's Secret"; Transliteration: "Irezumi no Himitsu" (Japanese: イレズミの秘密) | Directed by : Shunji Oga; Storyboarded by : Yuji Matsushima | Haruya Yamazaki | The Ultimate Weapon | December 9, 1982 |
Cobra and Dominique manage to escape from the Snow Gorillas on jet skis and are rescued by Lady in the Turtle. He tells Dominique about the deaths of her sisters at the hands of the Guild. Cobra superimposes the images of the tattoos from the three sisters, but it fails to reveal a map. He tries color filters and the computer finally generates a map, showing the treasure on planet Zados, the sand planet. Text in the tattoo image says that the ultimate weapon can be found in a pyramid on the planet. He now knows why the Guild was so keen to find Nelson's 'treasure'.
| 11 | "Zados, the Sand Planet"; Transliteration: "Suna no Wakusei Zadosu" (Japanese: 砂の惑星ザドス) | Directed by : Shunji Oga; Storyboarded by : Makura Saki | Kosuke Miki | The Ultimate Weapon | December 16, 1982 |
Following the tattoo map, Cobra, Dominique and Lady Armaroid arrive at planet Zados. They were followed by Sandra and the Snow Gorillas and although Cobra shoots down their space ship Sandra enters the pyramid first. Cobra follows but it contains a maze of corridors and he is caught in Sandra's piano string trap. He escapes and they play a cat and mouse game through the corridors. Sandra finds a doorway to the royal tomb surrounded by human skeletons and a moat and containing a female water-snake beast. Sandra's mechanical dog attacks the beast and as Sandra prepares to proceed, Cobra arrives. The water-snake beast kills Sandra's dog and it captures Cobra and Sandra, dragging them underwater. Sandra escapes and commences to unlock the doorway. Cobra is trapped underwater, but finds a small underwater passage and uses his Psychogun to kill the beast. Sandra enters the treasure chamber, but Cobra is already there. It appears that the room only contains treasure, but Sandra finds an egg-shaped object containing an eye.
| 12 | "The Dreadful Ultimate Weapon"; Transliteration: "Osorubeshi Saishūheiki" (Japanese: 恐るべし最終兵器) | Directed by : Shunji Oga; Storyboarded by : Makura Saki | Haruya Yamazaki | The Ultimate Weapon | December 23, 1982 |
The object containing the eye is the Ultimate Weapon which transforms into a sword and Sandra attacks Cobra. She is too powerful and Cobra calls Lady to get information about the Ultimate Weapon from Mars Ancient History texts, however the essential 3rd volume was supposedly destroyed. Sandra emerges from the pyramid, but is now a golden giant. Sandra pursues Cobra and attempts to destroy the Turtle by setting it on fire. Cobra discovers that the 3rd volume of the Mars Ancient History is actually inscribed on top of the pyramid. Lady decodes the text and finds that the Ultimate Weapon can self-evolve. Sand Jack of the Pirate Guild arrives to take the Ultimate Weapon but Sandra refuses. He opens fire with laser cannon, and the Ultimate Weapon transforms into the same weapon and Sandra uses it to blast his men, his ship and him. Cobra tries unsuccessfully to fight back using a Snow Gorilla tank, so he retreats to the Turtle. Lady says the Ultimate Weapon will keep duplicating until it duplicates the universe and so the weapon must be destroyed. Cobra attacks Sandra and the Ultimate Weapon with the Turtle, before it has time to transform into a space ship and defeat them. Sandra is killed and the Ultimate Weapon returns to its original form. Cobra then hurls it into the sandy desert.
| 13 | "The Roulette of Death"; Transliteration: "Shi no Rūretto" (Japanese: 死のルーレット) | Directed by : Shunji Oga; Storyboarded by : Hisao Nakanishi | Haruya Yamazaki | Hammer Volt Joe | December 30, 1982 |
Cobra and Lady decide to investigate a stolen shipment of gold from Venus. They travel to Las Vegas Station as the best place for clues. Cobra meets a waitress in a casino owned by a Hammer Volt Joe - half-man, half-cyborg and Guild boss. She is under surveillance for being seen near the warehouse and Joe orders her killed. Cobra escapes with her, but uses the Psychogun and reveals his identity. Meanwhile Lady is seen near the warehouse. She sees the Venus transport ship but is captured by Hammer Volt Joe. Cobra tracks Joe down, and with the waitress he finds the gold shipment. Joe fires his rocket-powered fists at Cobra, but the waitress switches of the gravity controls rendering Joe's fists useless, and Cobra blasts him out of the space station. The waitress reveals herself to be Lucia Rodock, Galactic Patrol Lieutenant.
| 14 | "The Great Magician, Galtan"; Transliteration: "Dai Ma Ō Garutan" (Japanese: 大魔王ガルタン) | Directed by : Shunji Oga; Storyboarded by : Tatsuya Matsuno | Kenji Terada | Demon King Galtan | January 6, 1983 |
A giant chases a young woman, Bellamy, through space into Cobra's ship. He and Cobra fight, but he is so impressed with Cobra's strength he decides to make Cobra his servant. The giant takes the ship and its occupants to his satellite palace. Bellamy frees Cobra and explains that giant King Galtan uses powerful magic to loot nearby planets. They try to escape but are captured. Galtan offers Cobra gold, silver and women to be his assistant. Cobra refuses and is forced to swallow a balloon fruit, as has everyone in the palace. Galtan demonstrates how can make a person balloon up and explode. Cobra still refuses and Galtan make him swell. Bellamy uses magic to remove the fruit Cobra swallowed which she throws into the giant's mouth. She makes him swell up using the same magic spell. Galtan explodes, but reforms himself. He chases Cobra and Bellamy who have gone to the Room of Time where Lady and the ship is located. The find Lady and his ship turned to stone, which can only be reversed if Galtan is no more. To defeat him Bellamy says they must destroy a skull hidden in the room. Cobra solves the puzzle and Galtan is sent back into the bottle where he lived for the past 3,000 years.
| 15 | "My Dragon Crystal Friend!"; Transliteration: "Ryū Suishō no Tomoyo!" (Japanese: 竜水晶の友よ!) | Directed by : Shunji Oga; Storyboarded by : Kenji Kodama | Kosuke Miki | The Dragon's Crystal | January 13, 1983 |
Some time before his face change operation, Cobra and Lady are attacked by Guild ships. The almost escape, but encounter a large number of planet Wing's defense force between Charybe and Scylla. Commander Vega of Wing's defense warns the Guild ships to withdraw. Cobra thanks him for saving them and departs. Now, 8 years later, planet Wing has been taken over by the Guild. Cobra heads to Talcaros to meet Vega who is now a Guild fugitive. Cobra convinces him that he is still alive. They agree to retrieve the Wing's Dragon's Crystal from the Guild although Vega has little time left to live. He will transform into a winged figure the die six hours later. The security at the Art Museum where it is held is very high, but they gain access. That night Cobra manages to steal the crystal, and, following Vega's transformation, he flies Cobra away. Cobra promises to take the crystal back to planet Wings.
| 16 | "To Hell! Rug Ball"; Transliteration: "Jigoku e! Ragubōru" (Japanese: 地獄へ!ラグ・ボール) | Shunji Oga | Haruya Yamazaki | Rug-Ball | January 20, 1983 |
Dominique wants Cobra to go undercover as a rug-ball player to find drugs being smuggled by the Pirate Guild. Rug-Ball is a combat game which combines American football and baseball. On planet Ralu, as Joe Gillian, Cobra joins the Red Saxons who are linked to the Guild. His fighting skills impress Mr. Rand the manager, so he is moved to Division 1, but finds the players play pretty rough. When Cobra gets into a fight with another player Gelt who is hassling a young cheerleader, team captain Dan Blood warns him not to make enemies on the team.
| 17 | "The Good-For-Nothing Team"; Transliteration: "Narazumono Chīmu" (Japanese: ならず者チーム) | Directed by : Shunji Oga; Storyboarded by : Hisao Nakanishi | Haruya Yamazaki | Rug-Ball | January 27, 1983 |
Cobra saves the cheerleader, Miranda, from Gelt again, and he asks her to get something for him - the plans of the stadium. Cobra finds a restricted area District 21, and suspects that it is where the drugs are stored. Division 2 players practice against Division 1 to try to progress, but Division 1 use them as their training toys. Cobra is offered a chance to pick a team of Division 2 players to play against Division 1. He chooses team Z, the Good For Nothing Team. They are a rough group, led by ex-pirate Zac Simon. Cobra and Zac are old friends, and Zac helps convince the team to play for Cobra.
| 18 | "Death Game! At 00:78 O'Clock"; Transliteration: "Desugēmu! 0078 Ji" (Japanese: デスゲーム!0078時) | Hideyoshi Oga | Kosuke Miki | Rug-Ball | February 3, 1983 |
Cobra and the Z Team prepare for the big match against Division 1. The game starts well for the Z Team in defense, by targeting the Division 1 Players' weak spots. When the Z Team bat, Division 1 play rough and Geck, one of the four brothers on the team, is killed. However Cobra bats next, and manages to score a home run putting the Z Team 1 point ahead.
| 19 | "Will It Happen?! A Grand Slam From Behind"; Transliteration: "Naruka!? Gyakuten Hōmu Ran" (Japanese: なるか!?逆転ホームラン) | Directed by : Masaharu Okuwaki; Storyboarded by : Kenji Kodama | Kenji Terada | Rug-Ball | February 10, 1983 |
Round 2 of the Rug-Ball match commences. Rand doesn't want the Division 1 team beaten, and offers Cobra money to lose the game. Cobra plays to win, however he is double-teamed by the other side and is taken off injured. He leaves the infirmary and looks for the drug shipment. Without him the team struggles and Division 1 scores 2 home runs. Cobra finds the drugs and downloads the shipping details to trace their route, however he is recorded by surveillance cameras. He returns to the field and helps his team, but Rand now knows his true purpose and places snipers at the exits. Cobra hides the data in the ball and hits the ball out of the stadium where Dominique retrieves it, giving the Galactic Patrol the justification to arrest Rand. The home run wins the game for the Z Team.
| 20 | "Death Match! The Horror of the Sand Ocean"; Transliteration: "Shitō! Suna no Umi no Kyōfu" (Japanese: 死闘!砂の海の恐怖) | Directed by : Shunji Oga; Storyboarded by : Hisao Nakanishi | Haruya Yamazaki | The Swordians | February 17, 1983 |
Cobra lands on planet Bakoosa with a sea of sand that was inhabited by the Swordians. An old Swordian is thrown out of a bar for continually singing a sad song about their glorious past. After visiting the sand sea, Cobra and Lady return to the town and find it deserted. People have been killed by swords and their ship the Turtle is damaged. Lady is attacked by armored sword wielding figures who cannot be killed, but when Cobra breaks a sword, the figure disintegrates. Cobra leads some of the settler survivors out on the local gladas beasts into the Sand Sea to look for a solution. The old Swordian tells the story of invasion where the original inhabitants were dispossessed of their lands until a leader, Babel, fought back with powerful weapons changing the Swordians into tyrants. They are attacked by Swordians and Lady is captured. Cobra takes advantage of the Sand Sea and defeats them, rescuing Lady.
| 21 | "The Two Sword Kings"; Transliteration: "Futari no Sōdo Ō" (Japanese: 二人のソード王) | Directed by : Masaharu Okuwaki; Storyboarded by : Kenji Kodama | Haruya Yamazaki | The Swordians | February 24, 1983 |
Cobra and Lady create a distraction for the Swordians in the Sand Sea so that the settlers can escape. However Swordians' secret base, the Sand Rook which rises out of the sand and they are captured. Cobra escapes from his cell, finds a hidden passageway and discovers the chained Swordian King Jeek. He explains that the Swordians are actually swords, and the armoured figures who wield them are their puppets. They used to feed on the energy of animals, but now Babel is now using humans instead. Cobra frees King Jeek, and dressed in his armour, challenges Babel to a duel. During the fight, Babel is exposed to be using a robot to amplify his psychic powers. Cobra uses his own senses to defeat him, restoring King Jeek to the throne and allowing the settlers to remain without fear.
| 22 | "The Underground Visitor"; Transliteration: "Chitei no Kyaku" (Japanese: 地底の客) | Shunji Oga | Kosuke Miki | Jingalo | March 3, 1983 |
Cobra goes to planet Rifle to visit his old friend, Jingalo who built his ship the Turtle 15 years ago. While riding to Jingalo's place he is attacked by Pirate Guild machines. He finds Harvey the robot that shows him a videotape made by Jingalo before his death about the Pirate Guild takeover of the local mines and kidnap of his granddaughter Yuuko. Harvey takes him to the underground drilling machine and they leave to find the Pirate Guild's underground base. He battles the Pirate Guild machines and follows one to their base. He finds Yuuko among other women in a cavern leading to a Pirate Guild factory which uses the lode ore to manufacture drugs. He sabotages the factory and escapes with Yuuko and Harvey.
| 23 | "The Tomb at the Bottom of the Ocean"; Transliteration: "Kaitei no Bohyō" (Japanese: 海底の墓標) | Directed by : Masaharu Okuwaki; Storyboarded by : Tatsuya Matsuno | Kenji Terada | Pirate Ironhead | March 10, 1983 |
Cobra is on vacation with Dominique near Port Osiris when the cruise ship Queen Carady is attacked and sunk. Their boat is then attacked by large torpedo-firing metal fish and Dominique is captured. He is chased by women underwater, but after he is shot in the arm by a poison arrow from a spear gun, cannot use the Psychogun. Ashore, the locals will not speak to him and he is threatened by one of his attackers. He kills her instead and collapses from the poison. Ellis, a local woman, takes him to her hut where she explains that the pirate Ironhead sinks ships carrying gold and takes it to their underwater base. He detects that Ellis is a cyborg, the same as those who attacked him, and after some pyrotechnics, travels to Ironhead's underwater base in the Turtle's submarine. He enters the base and commences its destruction. He meets the woman leader Ironhead, destroys her body and rescues Dominique. Ironhead gets a new body and chases them, but he finally destroys her and they are rescued by Lady in the Turtle.
| 24 | "Care to Buy a Robot?"; Transliteration: "Robotto wa Ikaga?" (Japanese: ロボットはいかが?) | Directed by : Masaharu Okuwaki; Storyboarded by : Kenji Kodama | Haruya Yamazaki | Robot Zaval O | March 17, 1983 |
While planning to rob the Galactic bank, Cobra and Lady buy a cute robot as they pass through a bazaar. It has a forearm attached by a chain which Cobra shoots off and leaves. After recharging, the robot starts to retrieve its memory, including that it had a mission. That night, the forearm regenerates into a humanoid robot. It generates lightning and brings the abandoned robots in the junkyard to life. In the morning, they find their robot gone, and a crew of women nectar gatherers murdered. Their docile nectar gathering robots have become murderous as well as all of the robots in the city. Meanwhile the humanoid robot has become a giant, absorbing other robots into its body. They find their little robot which explains that the robots are being controlled by Zaval O which was its prisoner. Zaval O was created by a warring planet to control robots and kill humans, and is indestructible. The little robot uses the only weapon that's effective against it and reverses time. Now, when Cobra sees the little robot in the bazaar, he doesn't buy it.
| 25 | "Cobra Is Dead?!"; Transliteration: "Kobura ga Shinda!?" (Japanese: コブラが死んだ!?) | Directed by : Masaharu Okuwaki; Storyboarded by : Hisao Nakanishi | Kosuke Miki | The Silver Diamonds | March 24, 1983 |
Cobra steals 30,000 silver diamonds from The Guild, and heads for planet Lark to hide out. While Cobra has a check-up with his doctor, Cyborgs on magnetic roller skates capture Lady. Weapons maker Brian Reed of the Leord Society demands their return in exchange for Lady. Cobra tries to break into the Leord headquarters but is captured. The woman who told him their location is frozen in a pool of liquid nitrogen and killed. When Reed threatens to kill Lady, Cobra divulges the location of the diamonds which he accuses Reed of stealing from the Ginef mines. Reed's men retrieve the diamonds, but when Cobra is freed, they push him into the pool of liquid nitrogen. As he falls, he frees Lady who shoots Reed's men and carries the frozen Cobra to his doctor. Reed's men track them and attack. Lady holds them off while the doctor flies off in his mobile surgery. Just as the mobile surgery is boarded by Reed's men, Cobra revives and shoots them. He goes after Reed on a jet-powered skateboard, and attacks their truck, taking out the cyborgs and retrieving the diamonds.
| 26 | "Beyond the Fires of War"; Transliteration: "Senka no Kanata ni" (Japanese: 戦火の彼方に) | Masaharu Okuwaki | Haruya Yamazaki | The National Royal Rubies | March 31, 1983 |
In the neutral Piradin area, Kazaar and Domel recruiters try to enlist aliens for their troops. Cobra is there to retrieve a briefcase that thieves stole from the Merce Temple. Meanwhile a battle rages between the two forces and he finds a child with a dying grandfather trapped under rubble. Cobra agrees to take the child to Killadeen spaceport. They are captured by four Kazaar survivors under Lieutenant Shella. Cobra says he's Johnson, a scientist conducting historic research. In a struggle, the briefcase falls open showing the National Royal Rubies. The Kazaar troops agree to escort Cobra and the child to Killadeen spaceport, 200 km across the Vella Desert in exchange for part of the treasure. On the way they suspect one of the group to be a Domel spy. With mistrust and attacks, only Lieutenant Shella, Cobra and the child arrive at the outskirts of Killadeen spaceport. Lieutenant Shella is revealed to be the Domel spy, but Cobra fools her into being shot by hard-skinned light-sensitive beetles. Cobra leaves the child with the National Royal Rubies at the spaceport to be picked up by her mother. Cobra and Lady leave empty-handed.
| 27 | "The Evil Overlord! Salamander"; Transliteration: "Aku no Teiō! Saramandā" (Japanese: 悪の帝王!サラマンダー) | Directed by : Masaharu Okuwaki; Storyboarded by : Kenji Kodama | Kenji Terada | Evil Emperor Salamander | April 7, 1983 |
Dominique calls Cobra with concerns that someone may be watching her and they agree to meet in the Century Hotel. Before Cobra arrives, Dominique is captured by Salamander, a character with strange powers. Cobra and Lady arrive at Barosde and he is followed by Pirate Guild assassins. Concerned about Dominique he goes to the hotel, but finds only the skin of her back with the butterfly tattoo. Full of remorse and feeling responsible for her death, he goes after the Guild. Meanwhile the Guild tries to assassinate Lady with a bomb. She is badly damaged and placed in the care of Professor Maseron. Cobra suspects that someone in the Galaxy Patrol has been working for the Guild. Cobra gets information from Bista that her room was bugged by Dober, a rebel within the Galaxy Patrol who has an energy blaster in his arm. He sets a trap, and corners Dober. They fight and Dober reveals that Salamander is based on planet Valentine. Salamander is the admiral of the Pirate Guild forces and commands over 1,000 vessels. Cobra swears revenge on Salamander.
| 28 | "Cobra's Angry Revenge"; Transliteration: "Kobura Ikari no Hōfuku e" (Japanese: コブラ怒りの報復へ) | Directed by : Masaharu Okuwaki; Storyboarded by : Hiroshi Fukutomi | Kenji Terada | Evil Emperor Salamander | April 21, 1983 |
In a remote outpost bar, a shoot-out happens over a card game. Cobra challenges the survivor, Fast-Fire Doug Savallas, to a gunfight, but they are revealed to be old friends. They foil a trap set for them by the Guild with Doug using his shape-changing skills. Cobra recruits him and plans to find two others, Pumpkin and Bud, to take revenge on Salamander. Pumpkin is currently in prison so they must free him. Disguised as a guard, Doug takes Cobra in as a prisoner, but soon suspects that Salamander is aware of their presence. Another prisoner tries to kill Cobra, but he is saved by Pumpkin. Doug is caught and is forced to infect them with dysentery, but tricks them into releasing Cobra and Pumpkin. They head to the frozen north pole of Neptura to collect Bud.
| 29 | "The Man From The Arctic And Their Fiery Blood"; Transliteration: "Kyokuhoku no Otoko Atsuki Chi Yo" (Japanese: 極北の男・熱き血よ) | Michio Banno | Kosuke Miki | Evil Emperor Salamander | April 28, 1983 |
Cobra, Doug, and Pumpkin arrive at Bud's polar laboratory. Earlier, Bud was captured and Salamander's forces prepared a trap. Cobra's vehicle is attacked and destroyed by walking war units. Only what appears to be Cobra's lifeless body is retrieved. Left alone, the body transforms into Doug. Bud saw through Doug's disguise with his enhanced seeing, hearing and smelling skills. However Bud is happy with his life on Neptura and his partner Elsa, and refuses to join them in their mission. After leaving them, his ship is attacked by Salamander's kingdom tank and Elsa is killed. Cobra goes to help and stops the tank. With Elsa dead, Bud decides to join Cobra and the others to take revenge on Salamander.
| 30 | "How to Defeat Salamander"; Transliteration: "Saramandā o Taosu Hō" (Japanese: サラマンダーを倒す法) | Directed by : Masaharu Okuwaki; Storyboarded by : Tatsuya Matsuno | Haruya Yamazaki | Evil Emperor Salamander | May 12, 1983 |
Cobra and his team raid the mansion of Pirate Guild boss El Rodes. Known as Devil Troll when a customs officer, he is now manufacturer and distributor of the Rodo drug. The team disposes of his men, Doug impersonates him and they infiltrate the Guild's annual reunion at Casino Station where Cobra hopes to find Salamander. Cobra bandages his face to escape recognition, and once inside is surprised how many officials are members of the Guild. Cobra learns that Salamander is in the exclusive Observatory Room. He gains access, but Bud detects that Salamander is protected by an invisible barrier. Cobra learns that Salamander's favourite wrestler, El Skyman the Galaxy Heavyweight Champion will be fighting, so Cobra ambushes and then impersonates him. His opponent is Gadanga, Emperor of Underground Wrestling. The match is rigged for El Skyman to win, but the disguised Cobra makes Gadanga angry and it turns into a real match. Cobra is almost beaten. The excitement makes Salamander move out of the protective barrier, and Cobra shoots him with his Psychogun. Cobra and his three friends leave, congratulating themselves on the success of their mission.
| 31 | "So Long! My Cobra!"; Transliteration: "Abayo! Ore no Kobura" (Japanese: あばよ!おれのコブラ) | Directed by : Masaharu Okuwaki; Storyboarded by : Kenji Kodama | Haruya Yamazaki | Evil Emperor Salamander | May 19, 1983 |
Bud returns to his home planet, but is attacked and killed by Salamander. The same happens to Pumpkin and Doug. On their way home, Cobra thinks he sees Dominique, but she says that she is Miral Judd, Guru of the Sect of Elrado. Cobra, now more vengeful than ever, heads for Salamander's home Planet Valentine, and the Elrado Shrine. He arrives at the shrine and is welcomed by Miral who says they are preparing to fire a huge figure of the Shido Goddess into space as a symbol of peace and freedom. They are attacked by Salamander's men in disguise and go to the launch control center where they find the archbishop preparing to launch immediately. The goddess statue is in fact a death satellite which will enable the Guild to take over the galaxy. When Salamander begins to program the Shido staue, Cobra tries to fight him, but fails because Salamander is just an energy being. Cobra reprograms the system to destroy itself, and finds and attacks the true Salamander. He finds the body of Adolf Hitler who dreamed of making the 3,000 year old plan of the Guild a reality. With Salamander's destruction, Dominique's consciousness returns, with no recollection of Miral. Meanwhile Lady has been repaired by Professor Maseron.

== See also ==
- List of Cobra the Animation episodes
