= List of The Kabocha Wine episodes =

This is a list of episodes of The Kabocha Wine, a 95-episode anime television series based on an award-winning manga series by Mitsuru Miura. The series was produced by Toei Animation and aired on TV Asahi from 5 July 1982 through 27 August 1984.

== Series summary ==
No.	Title	Original release date
1	"I am a man! Aoba Shunsuke"; Transliteration: "Watashi wa otokoda! Aoba Shunsuke" (Japanese: 私は男だ！青葉俊介)	5 July 1982
2	"My and that girl's necktie relationship" Transliteration: "Watashi to sono shōjo no nekutai kankei" (Japanese: 私とその少女のネクタイ関係)	12 July 1982
3	"Whut! Less than 70 points is garbage?" Transliteration: "Wa Whut!-Miman 70-ten gomidesu ka?" (Japanese: はWhut！未満70点ゴミですか？)	19 July 1982
4	"Frustrating, Embarrassing: My Family's Business"; Transliteration: "Furasutorēshon, hazukashii: Watashi no kazoku no bijinesu" (Japanese: フラストレーション、恥ずかしい：私の家族のビジネス)	26 July 1982
5	"There's things scarier than Eru."; Transliteration: "Iroirona koto o Eru yori mo kowai ~desu." (Japanese: いろいろなことをイルよりも怖いです。)	2 August 1982
6	"A night alone together?" Transliteration: "1-Haku dake issho ni?" (Japanese: 1泊だけ一緒に？)	9 August 1982
7	"Sweet and painful, the present plan" Transliteration: "Amaku setsunai, genzai keikaku" (Japanese: 甘く切ない、現在計画)	16 August 1982
8	"A man's secret that he won't let anyone see" Transliteration: "Mirarete tamaru ka otoko no himitsu" (Japanese: 見られてたまるか男の秘密)	23 August 1982
9	"Don't act all cute, dorm leader" Transliteration: "Burikko wa naize ryōchō-san" (Japanese: ぶりっ子はないぜ寮長さん)	13 September 1982
10	"Get Eru's bikini Back!"; Transliteration: "Eru no bikini o torikaese!" (Japanese: エルのビキニを取り返せ！)	20 September 1982
11	"Who is Tekkin's spy?" Transliteration: "Tekkin no supai wa dare da?" (Japanese: テッキンのスパイは誰だ!?)	11 October 1982
12	"Communicating my feelings into the Love Casette"; Transliteration: "Rabu kasetto ni omoi o komete" (Japanese: ラブカセットに思いをこめて)	18 October 1982
13	"The Brick Angel has Arrived"; Transliteration: "Burikko tenshi ga yattekita" (Japanese: ブリッコ天使がやって来た)	25 October 1982
14	"A stormy night between me and him" Transliteration: "Ore to aitsu no arashi no ichiya" (Japanese: おれとあいつの嵐の一夜)	1 November 1982
15	"Beat your love rival" Transliteration: "Koi no raibaru buttobase" (Japanese: 恋のライバルぶっとばせ)	8 November 1982
16	"Girl Power is killing me" Transliteration: "Gyaru・Pawā demō shini sō" (Japanese: ギャル・パワーでもう死にそう)	15 November 1982
17	"My Dream, His Dream"; Transliteration: "Ore no yume aitsu no yume" (Japanese: おれの夢あいつの夢)	22 November 1982
18	"Male or female!? Demon senior" Transliteration: "Otoko ka onna ka? Oni no senpai" (Japanese: 男か女か!?鬼の先輩)	29 November 1982
19	"What, Eru is engaged to Tekkin!?"; Transliteration: "Nanutsu, Eru ga Tekkin to konyaku!?" (Japanese: ナヌッ、エルがテッキンと婚約!?)	6 December 1982
20	"A cheery song from L to S"; Transliteration: "L kara S e no ōen uta" (Japanese: LからSへの応援歌)	13 December 1982
21	"The scratch on my butt that he saw" Transliteration: "Aitsu ni mirare ta shiri no kizu" (Japanese: あいつに見られた尻のキズ)	20 December 1982
22	"I'm the clumsy one who made her cry!" Transliteration: "Aitsu o naka seta doji naore!" (Japanese: あいつを泣かせたドジなおれ！)	10 January 1983
23	"Me and him swimming in the cold" Transliteration: "Ore to aitsu no kanchū suiei" (Japanese: おれとあいつの寒中水泳)	17 January 1983
24	"Snow falls on the shared umbrella" Transliteration: "Aiai gasa ni yuki ga furu" (Japanese: 相合傘に雪が降る)	24 January 1983
25	"Me and Eru's pretend date" Transliteration: "Ore to Eru to no Dēto Gokko" (Japanese: おれとエルとのデートごっこ)	31 January 1983
26	"Happy Birthday to the two part-timers" Transliteration: "Futari no Baito wa Happī・Bāsudē" (Japanese: ふたりのバイトはハッピー・バースデー)	7 February 1983
27	"Shock! Eru has disappeared!?" Transliteration: "Gān! Eru ga kieta!?" (Japanese: ガーン！エルが消えた!?)	14 February 1983
28	"Get closer with hypnosis!!" Transliteration: "Saimin-jutsu se sai sekkin!!" (Japanese: 催眠術で大接近!!)	21 February 1983
29	"My Ice Dance with him" Transliteration: "Ore to aitsu no aisu dansu" (Japanese: おれとあいつのあいすダンス)	28 February 1983
30	"The day I become a woman" Transliteration: "Ore ga onna ni natta hi" (Japanese: おれが女になった日)	7 March 1983
31	"I found out about my and her baby!" Transliteration: "Ore to aitsu no bebī shitta~a" (Japanese: おれとあいつのベビー知ったァ！)	14 March 1983
32	"Eru calls out in the Devil's Mansion"; Transliteration: "Akuma no takata de Eru ga yobu" (Japanese: 悪魔の館でエルが呼ぶ)	21 March 1983
33	"A canoe race for a date" Transliteration: "Dēto o kaketa kanū・rēsu" (Japanese: デートを賭けたカヌー・レース)	28 March 1983
34	"It's really annoying!" Transliteration: "Nyan to moshaku ni sawaru yatsu!" (Japanese: ニャンともしゃくにさわるヤツ！)	4 April 1983
35	"Will it finally be revealed!? The women's castle" Transliteration: "Tsui ni bareru ka!? Onna no shiro" (Japanese: ついにばれるか!?女の城)	11 April 1983
36	"Eru competes with women" Transliteration: "Eru wa onna de shōbu suru" (Japanese: エルは女で勝負する)	18 April 1983
37	"The princess who appeared one day" Transliteration: "Aru hitotsuzen ohimesama" (Japanese: ある日突然お姫さま)	25 April 1983
38	"Lovey-dovey ticket for two" Transliteration: "Raburabu ai no futarikkiri ken" (Japanese: ラブラブ愛の二人っきり券)	2 May 1983
39	"Ramen or Eru? That is the question!!" Transliteration: "Rāmen ka Eru ka? Sore ga Mondaida!!" (Japanese: ラーメンかエルか？それが問題だ!!)	9 May 1983
40	"The handcuffs of love that bind the two of us" Transliteration: "Futari o tsunagu ai no tejō" (Japanese: ふたりをつなぐ愛の手錠)	16 May 1983
41	"Oh No! Eru took off her skirt!!" Transliteration: "Gikutsu! Eru ga sukāto o nuida!!" (Japanese: ギクッ！エルがスカートをぬいだ!!)	23 May 1983
42	"Eru and the princess' love call" Transliteration: "Hime to Eru to no rabukōru" (Japanese: 姫とエルとのラブコール)	30 May 1983
43	"A wedding ticket stuck on my hip" Transliteration: "Hippu ni hatta kekkon kippu" (Japanese: ヒップに貼った結婚キップ)	6 June 1983
44	"When I opened the window, Princess Kaguya"; Transliteration: "Mado o aketara kaguya-hime" (Japanese: 窓をあけたらかぐや姫)	20 June 1983
45	"A close look at Eru's secrets!!" Transliteration: "Eru no himitsu o mitchaku shuzai" (Japanese: エルのひみつを密着取材!!)	27 June 1983
46	"I want to die together with you Eru"; Transliteration: "Eru to issho ni shinde moraimasu" (Japanese: エルと一緒に死んでもらいます)	4 July 1983
47	"That really touched me! His feelings" Transliteration: "Jīn to kitaze! Aitsu no omoi" (Japanese: ジーンと来たぜ！あいつの想い)	11 July 1983
48	"Something that happened in the middle of the night that I can't tell anyone about" Transliteration: "Dare ni mo ienai yonaka no dekigoto" (Japanese: 誰にも言えない夜中の出来事)	18 July 1983
49	"Our sweet home" Transliteration: "Oretachi 2-ri no suīto hōmu" (Japanese: おれたち2人のスイートホーム)	25 July 1983
50	"What! I'm engaged?!" Transliteration: "Nanutsu! Ore ga konyaku shite tatte!?" (Japanese: ナヌッ！おれが婚約してたって!?)	8 August 1983
51	"A night for two seen through the stars" Transliteration: "Hoshi ni mirare ta futari no yoru" (Japanese: 星に見られた二人の夜)	15 August 1983
52	"Aim for Eru and become a man" Transliteration: "Eru o mezashite otoko ni nare" (Japanese: エルをめざして男になれ)	22 August 1983
53	"My substitute, held by Eru"; Transliteration: "Eru ni daka reta ore no migawari" (Japanese: エルに抱かれたおれの身代り)	29 August 1983
54	"Dressing up with Eru"; Transliteration: "Ore to Eru to no kisegae gokko" (Japanese: おれとエルとの着せ替えごっこ)	5 September 1983
55	"The love letter that got Eru undressed" Transliteration: "Eru o nura seta raburetā" (Japanese: エルを脱がせたラブレター)	12 September 1983
56	"Secret photos that no one else can see" Transliteration: "Tanin ni wa misenai ○ shashin" (Japanese: 他人には見せない○写真)	19 September 1983
57	"Eru's heart pounding! Time Capsule"; Transliteration: "Eru ga mune-kyun! Taimu Kapuseru" (Japanese: エルが胸キュン！タイムカプセル)	26 September 1983
58	"Shock! Eru's nude photos" Transliteration: "Shokku! Eru no nūdo shashin" (Japanese: ショック！エルのヌード写真)	17 October 1983
59	"First kiss in the storm" Transliteration: "Arashi no naka no fāsuto・kissu" (Japanese: 嵐の中のファースト・キッス)	24 October 1983
60	"What!! Eru's panty information" Transliteration: "Nanutsu!! Eru no panti jōhō" (Japanese: ナヌッ!!エルのパンティ情報)	31 October 1983
61	"A newlywed apartment just for the two of us" Transliteration: "Futari-kkiri no shinkon apāto" (Japanese: ふたりっきりの新婚アパート)	7 November 1983
62	"Eru and I run together and train" Transliteration: "Eru no 2-ri dekake ochi shugyō" (Japanese: エルと2人でかけおち修行)	14 November 1983
63	"Eru's SOS at the Hotel"; Transliteration: "Eru ga Hoteru de SOS!!" (エルがホテルでSOS!!)	21 November 1983
64	"Suddenly approaching!! Girl A"; Transliteration: "Kyū sekkin!! Shōjo A" (Japanese: 急接近!!少女A)	28 November 1983
65	"No Trespassing!! Saturday night" Transliteration: "Tachii rikinshi!! Doyō no yoru" (Japanese: 立入禁止!!土曜の夜)	5 December 1983
66	"What, you want a baby now!?" Transliteration: "Nanutsu akachan ga hoshiku natta!?" (Japanese: ナヌッ赤ちゃんが欲しくなった!?)	12 December 1983
67	"Finally we broke up!! Me and Eru"; Transliteration: "Tsui ni zekkō!! Ore to Eru" (Japanese: ついに絶交!!おれとエル)	19 December 1983
68	"Don't make Eru take off her clothes without permission!" Transliteration: "Eru o katte ni nigaseru na!" (Japanese: エルを勝手に脱がせるな！)	26 December 1983
69	"Horror! I kissed a ghost" Transliteration: "Zōtsu! Yūrei to kissu o shita" (Japanese: ゾーッ！幽霊とキッスをした)	9 January 1984
70	"A trip to Hawaii with the girl in the bikini" Transliteration: "Bikini no aitsu to Hawai ryokō" (Japanese: ビキニのあいつとハワイ旅行)	16 January 1984
71	"Eru gets attacked in the middle of the night!" Transliteration: "Eru ga yonaka ni osowareru!" (Japanese: エルが夜中に襲われる！)	23 January 1984
72	"Love fortune-telling that will tear you two apart" Transliteration: "Futari o hiki saku koi uranai" (Japanese: 二人をひき裂く恋占い)	30 January 1984
73	"First love in the open-air bath" Transliteration: "Hatsukoi dōshi no rotenburo" (Japanese: 初恋同士の露天風呂)	6 February 1984
74	"A hotline between me and Eru"; Transliteration: "Ore to Eru to no hottorain" (Japanese: おれとエルとのホットライン)	13 February 1984
75	"Tekkin's official time for two" Transliteration: "Tekkin kōnin futari no jikan" (Japanese: テッキン公認ふたりの時間)	20 February 1984
76	"Eru's sudden transformation!!" Transliteration: "Eru ga totsuzen da henshin!!" (Japanese: エルが突然大変身!!)	27 February 1984
77	"What! Nita's name is Aoba Harusuke"; Transliteration: "Nanutsu! Nita no na wa Aoba Harusuke" (Japanese: ナヌッ！ニタの名は青葉春助)	5 March 1984
78	"Hooray! Tekkin is quitting" Transliteration: "Banzāi! Tekkin ga yameru" (Japanese: バンザーイ！テッキンが辞める)	12 March 1984
79	"Eru's Love Love Jockey"; Transliteration: "Eru no Rabu・Rabu・Jokkī" (Japanese: エルのラブ・ラブ・ジョッキー)	19 March 1984
80	"Our declaration of independence" Transliteration: "Oretachi futari no dokuritsu sengen" (Japanese: おれたち二人の独立宣言)	26 March 1984
81	"Me and Eru playing parenting games" Transliteration: "Ore to Eru to no kosodate gokko" (Japanese: おれとエルとの子育てごっこ)	16 April 1984
82	"Don't let Eru get to you, it's a shame for men" Transliteration: "Eru ni todoku na otoko no haji" (Japanese: エルに届くな男の恥)	23 April 1984
83	"Our surprise part-time job" Transliteration: "Oretachi futari no dokkiri baito" (Japanese: おれたち二人のドッキリバイト)	30 April 1984
84	"Eru got married!" Transliteration: "Eru ga kekkon shi chatta~a!" (Japanese: エルが結婚しちゃったァ！)	7 May 1984
85	"Aoba Bathhouse in the night sky, Monday, Wednesday and Friday"; Transliteration: "Yozora no aoba yu, gessuikan" (Japanese: 夜空のあおば湯、月水金)	14 May 1984
86	"When I wake up to study" Transliteration: "Ore ga benkyō ni mezameru toki" (Japanese: おれが勉強にめざめるとき)	21 May 1984
87	"A lovey-dovey diary that shouldn't be seen" Transliteration: "Mirarecha komaru raburabu nikki" (Japanese: 見られちゃ困るラブラブ日記)	28 May 1984
88	"What! Tekkin is my father!?" Transliteration: "Nanutsu! Tekkin ha ore no oyaji!?" (Japanese: ナヌッ！テッキンがおれの親父!?)	4 June 1984
89	"If you don't take your pants off, you're not a man" Transliteration: "Pantsu o nuganyaka otoko janai" (Japanese: パンツを脱がなきゃ男じゃない)	25 June 1984
90	"A terrifying naked test" Transliteration: "Hadaka de ukeru kyōfu no tesuto" (Japanese: 裸で受ける恐怖のテスト)	2 July 1984
91	"Eru and I are on the verge of fainting!" Transliteration: "Ore to Eru to ga shisshin sunzen!" (Japanese: おれとエルとが失神寸前！)	9 July 1984
92	"I Love You! Eru"; Transliteration: "Ai・Rabu・Yū! Eru" (Japanese: アイ・ラブ・ユー！エル)	16 July 1984
93	"A school trip just for the two of us" Transliteration: "Futari dake no shūgaku ryokō" (Japanese: 二人だけの修学旅行)	23 July 1984
94	"His underwear is made in Italy"; Transliteration: "Aitsu no shitagi wa itarī sei" (Japanese: あいつの下着はイタリー製)	20 August 1984
95	"Farewell! Sunshine Academy"; Transliteration: "Saraba! Sanshain gakuen" (Japanese: さらば！サンシャイン学園)	27 August 1984

== Theme music ==
Title	Lyrics	Composition and arrangement	Vocals
L(Eru) wa Lovely	Written by Akira Ito 伊藤アキラ	Composed by Koji 馬飼野康二 Arranged by Aichi eaves いちひさし	Performed by Kumiko Kaori as the opening theme
Aoba Shunsuke The Konjou	Written by Akira Ito 伊藤アキラ	Composed by Kobayashi Asia Star 小林亜星 Arranged by Aichi eaves いちひさし	Performed by Toshio Furukawa as ending theme #1 in anime role as Shunsuke Aoba
Pumpkin Night	Written by Akira Ito 伊藤アキラ Matsumoto Yukari 松本由佳理	Composed by Kobayashi Asia Star 小林亜星	Performed by Toshio Furukawa and Keiko Yokozawa as ending theme #2 in anime roles as Shunsuke Aoba and Natsumi Eru Asaoka respectively
