= List of The Mysterious Cities of Gold episodes =

The 39 episodes of the animated series The Mysterious Cities of Gold were co-produced between DIC Entertainment and Studio Pierrot. The series premiere episode was broadcast in Japan on NHK on May 1, 1982, and ran until its conclusion on February 5, 1983. The plot follows a young Spanish boy named Esteban who joins a voyage to the New World in search of the lost Seven Cities of Gold and his father.

The series aired in the English dubbed format in the United States, premiering on Nickelodeon on June 30, 1986, and running through March 23, 1987. English dubbed episodes also aired in the United Kingdom on Children's BBC from September 1, 1986, to June 22, 1987, and in Australia, on the public broadcaster ABC in 1986. The series was translated and aired in France on Antenne 2. The episodes have been released to both VHS and DVD in France, Belgium, Japan, Canada (in French) and Germany. In 2007, Fabulous Films acquired the license to release the series in Region 2 (Europe), Region 1, and Region 4. All 39 unedited episodes of the series were released in the United Kingdom in June 2008 as a six DVD set with the picture and sound restored. The DVD was released in Australia in August 2008 and later in North America in April 2009. In 2013 the original series was released on Blu-ray in France.

== Episode list ==
=== Season 1 (1986) ===
No.	Title	Original release date	Other air dates
1	"Esteban, Child of the Sun"; Transliteration: "Taiyô no ko Esteban (The Beginning)" (Japanese: 太陽の子エステバン)	1 May 1982 (NHK)	28 September 1983 (France 2); 30 June 1986 (Nickelodeon)
In 1532, Barcelona, Spain, a young orphan boy named Esteban begins an adventure to the New World after he meets a mysterious navigator in a tavern named Mendoza who claims to have saved him from a sinking ship when he was an infant. Esteban's father was lost, but Mendoza believes he may still be alive and shows Esteban the missing piece of a sun amulet which Esteban always wears as proof that they met before. Mendoza sneaks Esteban aboard the sailing ship Esperanza, and once in the hold, he meets a kidnapped Inca girl named Zia who has a sun medallion nearly identical to his own. Mini-documentary: History of the search for the Lost Cities of Gold
2	"Crossing the Atlantic"; Transliteration: "Ma no Mazelan kaikyô he (The Treacherous Strait of Magellan)" (Japanese: 魔のマゼラン海峡へ)	8 May 1982 (NHK)	5 October 1983 (France 2); 7 July 1986 (Nickelodeon)
The Esperanza sets across the Atlantic Ocean and Esteban gets to know Zia who tells him she was taken from her village when she was very young. Now the Spaniards are taking her back in hopes she will lead them to the legendary Cities of Gold. Eventually, the two are found by Gaspard, the captain of the guard, who believes they are stowaways. Mendoza defends the children which puts him at odds with Gaspard and his superiors, Captain Perez and Commander Gomez. Mini-documentary: The voyage of Christopher Columbus to find a new sea route to India
3	"Heroes Again"; Transliteration: "Ô tatsumaki no kyôfu (Terror of the Great Cyclone)" (Japanese: 大竜巻の恐怖)	15 May 1982 (NHK)	12 October 1983 (France 2); 14 July 1986 (Nickelodeon)
Mendoza uses his skills as an expert navigator to pilot the Esperanza through the treacherous Straits of Magellan, during which Esteban overhears a plot by Gaspard and Gomez to dispose of Mendoza once they have cleared the straits. Once the ship is through to the Pacific Ocean, Gaspard challenges Mendoza to a duel, but the ship suddenly encounters a typhoon and Captain Perez pleads for Mendoza to save the ship. Mini-documentary: Straits of Magellan
4	"Adrift on the Endless Sea"; Transliteration: "Ma no umi no hyôryû (Castaway on the Treacherous Sea)" (Japanese: 魔の海の漂流)	22 May 1982 (NHK)	19 October 1983 (France 2); 21 July 1986 (Nickelodeon)
Battered by the typhoon, the Esperanza breaks up and Captain Perez and the rest of the crew abandon ship leaving Mendoza, his two associates Pedro and Sancho, and the children to fend for themselves. The five build a raft and escape from the sinking ship. While adrift, Esteban learns that Zia's father is an Incan high priest who may be able to help him find his own father. Eventually, the castaways make it to the shore of a mysterious island. Mini-documentary: The perils of sailing and St. Elmo's Fire
5	"The Abduction of Zia"; Transliteration: "Sekai no hate no shima (Island at the End of the Earth)" (Japanese: 世界の果ての島)	29 May 1982 (NHK)	26 October 1983 (France 2); 28 July 1986 (Nickelodeon)
While exploring the island, Pedro and Sancho cross paths with a mysterious serpent-headed figure who Zia identifies as the Incan god Viracocha. At night, the figure returns and Esteban realizes that it is just a man in disguise and gives chase. When the figure encounters Zia, he carries her off in a canoe and Esteban swims after them. Later, Esteban washes ashore on another island and finds a village built in the branches of a giant tree. There he finds Zia and meets the mysterious figure, a native boy named Tao. Mini-documentary: The Galápagos Islands
6	"The Ship Solaris"; Transliteration: "Ra Mû no kyosen (The Huge Ship of King Mu)" (Japanese: ラ・ムーの巨船)	5 June 1982 (NHK)	2 November 1983 (France 2); 4 August 1986 (Nickelodeon)
Esteban and Zia befriend Tao and his pet parrot Kokapetl. Tao explains that he is the last of the Heva people, a great civilization that once existed on a continent that sank into the Pacific Ocean. Before the cataclysm, they hid their advanced knowledge within the Seven Cities of Gold on the mainland. When Mendoza and his men show up, Tao runs away with Zia and takes her to a hidden temple. There, Zia translates a message in a knotted string called a quipu which leads to events that releases the Solaris, a golden sailing vessel. Mini-documentary: The Lost Kingdom of Hiva
7	"Secret of the Solaris"; Transliteration: "Kyodai-sen no himitsu (Secret of the Great Ship)" (Japanese: 巨大船の秘密)	12 June 1982 (NHK)	9 November 1983 (France 2); 11 August 1986 (Nickelodeon)
Once aboard the Solaris, Tao uses his Heva encyclopedia to figure out how the ship works. He also reveals his mysterious gold jar which is another artifact of his people. Once underway, everyone's interest is drawn to a strange gold cube below deck that has no openings. Soon a Spanish galleon shows up with Señor Gomez and Captain Gaspard aboard. Tao and Esteban rush to figure out how the cube works and Esteban finds a hidden lever that deploys a metal sail from the main deck. The sail captures the sun's energy and powers a series of automated oars which allows the Solaris to outrun the pursuers. Mini-documentary: The Panama Canal, forts in Panama and piracy in the Caribbean
8	"The New Continent"; Transliteration: "Hajimete no shin tairiku (First Visit to the New Continent)" (Japanese: はじめての新大陸)	19 June 1982 (NHK)	16 November 1983 (France 2); 18 August 1986 (Nickelodeon)
Esteban and his friends finally make it to the mainland, but they are soon captured by Spaniards under the command of Governor Francisco Pizarro. Zia is brought to Pizarro's fortress and ordered to translate a golden quipu, but she refuses to read it. Mendoza promises to get her to cooperate, and in the meantime, Esteban and the others are locked up with a group of Incan prisoners. Mendoza later unleashes an escape plan to rescue everyone by setting fire to Pizarro's armory and slipping away amid the diversion. Mini-documentary: Spanish conquest of the Inca Empire
9	"The End of the Solaris"; Transliteration: "Ra Mû-gô no saigo (The Farewell of the Solaris)" (Japanese: ラ・ムー号の最後)	26 June 1982 (NHK)	23 November 1983 (France 2); 25 August 1986 (Nickelodeon)
Esteban and the others escape to the Solaris, but Gomez and his galleon appear. Tao learns that the solar sail can be used as a weapon and fires a heat beam at Gomez's ship setting it on fire. Tao uses another beam to drive off Pizarro's soldiers who are attacking a nearby village and then goes ashore to help the wounded. Gomez soon returns and captures the Solaris, but offers to exchange the ship for Zia. Zia surrenders, but once Gomez has her, he orders his cannons to fire upon the village. Tao sneaks back aboard the Solaris and overloads the solar weapon which explodes destroying both the Solaris and Gomez's ship. Mini-documentary: Andean Mountains, Settlement of the Americas, the Inca road system and the quipu
10	"Secret of the Temple"; Transliteration: "Chika shinden no himitsu (Secret of the Underground Temple)" (Japanese: 地下神殿の秘密)	3 July 1982 (NHK)	30 November 1983 (France 2); 1 September 1986 (Nickelodeon)
The children set out to find Puna, Zia's home village, but to get there, they must go through a pass blocked by Pizarro's fortress which is built atop an underground temple. Sneaking into the temple, the children find an old priest named Pasha who helps guide them further, but Pizarro sets a trap for them. Pasha reveals a secret escape route through a puzzle room, which once solved, melts a pillar of ice that collapses the temple and likewise brings down Pizarro's fortress. During the collapse, the children become separated from Mendoza and his men. Mini-documentary: Incan architecture
11	"Messengers of the Region"; Transliteration: "Makyô kara no shisha (Messengers From Wicked Men)" (Japanese: 魔境からの使者)	10 July 1982 (NHK)	7 December 1983 (France 2); 8 September 1986 (Nickelodeon)
As the children continue toward Zia's village, they discover they are being followed by two strange men dressed in panther skins. When they get to Zia's village, they find it abandoned and soon run into Gomez, Gaspard and their soldiers. There, Gomez threatens to feed Esteban and Tao to a nest of army ants unless Zia reveals the message of the golden quipu. She relents, saying that a City of Gold lies atop a nearby mountain peak which lies beyond a haunted forbidden zone. The children are eventually rescued by the two strange men, Wayna and Kecha, who explain that their great chief Kraka wishes to meet them. Mini-documentary: Village festivals, of Incan origin, in present-day Peru
12	"Secret of the Medallions"; Transliteration: "Pendanto no himitsu (Secret of the Pendants)" (Japanese: ペンダントの秘密)	17 July 1982 (NHK)	14 December 1983 (France 2); 15 September 1986 (Nickelodeon)
Wayna and Kecha take the children to a stronghold called the Fort of the Black Eagle. Meanwhile, Mendoza, Pedro and Sancho arrive at Gomez's camp and Mendoza offers Gomez help in navigating the treacherous forbidden zone. Mendoza leads the Spaniards to the fort and Gomez plans to attack it at nightfall. Mendoza secretly tips off Esteban to the plan and Tao builds a giant flare which lights up the night sky and helps the Incas drive off the invaders. The next morning, Wayna takes the children to the City of the High Peak where they meet Chief Kraka who identifies the medallions the children wear as keys to the gates of the cities of gold. Mini-documentary: Machu Picchu
13	"Mystery of the Parents"; Transliteration: "Chichi to haha no densetsu (Legend of Father and Mother)" (Japanese: 父と母との伝説)	24 July 1982 (NHK)	21 December 1983 (France 2); 22 September 1986 (Nickelodeon)
At the City of the High Peak, Tao discovers a marker which bears a sun symbol similar to Esteban and Zia's medallions. Chief Kraka suggests that the children speak to Myuca, an old seer living on Machu Picchu who knows more about the artifacts. When they meet, Myuca tells Esteban a story of a white man who came from across the ocean and married an Incan priestess. They had a child together, but the sun god Inti was angered by this and plunged the land into darkness. The villagers sacrificed the priestess and banished the man and his child to the sea. Esteban wonders if the tale is about his parents. Mini-documentary: Andean music and Andean musical instruments
14	"Esteban's Medallion"; Transliteration: "Futatsu no pendanto (The Two Pendants)" (Japanese: 2つのペンダント)	31 July 1982 (NHK)	28 December 1983 (France 2); 29 September 1986 (Nickelodeon)
Tao figures out that the marker points the way to the first city of gold, but before they can travel there, Esteban needs to have the sun symbol part of his medallion which Mendoza possesses. Outside the Fort of the Black Eagle, Gomez reinforces his men with a cannon that will surely destroy the fort, but Mendoza steals it and gives it to the Inca as a peace offering. The plan backfires however, and Mendoza, Pedro and Sancho are sentenced to be executed. Esteban shows up at the last second and asks the Inca to spare Mendoza because he came in order to give Esteban's sun symbol back to him. Mendoza reluctantly hands it over and Esteban completes his medallion. Mini-documentary: Incan graves, buried treasures and their symbolism
15	"The Subterranean Secret"; Transliteration: "Saigo no dasshutsu (The Last Escape)" (Japanese: 最後の脱出)	7 August 1982 (NHK)	4 January 1984 (France 2); 6 October 1986 (Nickelodeon)
Gomez's army attacks the Fort of the Black Eagle and Mendoza uses the stolen cannon against them, but knowing that Mendoza has a limited supply of ammo, Gomez pushes his assault. Tao fashions a set of makeshift hand grenades out of clay pots with the left over gunpowder and buys some time to plan an escape. Eventually the Incas are forced to abandon the fort and the children sneak out through a secret cave. Gaspard's soldiers spot them and give chase, but the children give them the slip by swimming through an underwater cave. Mini-documentary: Incan religion & New World crops
16	"The Urubus"; Transliteration: "Kyojin zoku no shûgeki (Attack of the Giants' Clan)" (Japanese: 巨人族の襲撃)	14 August 1982 (NHK)	11 January 1984 (France 2); 13 October 1986 (Nickelodeon)
The children meet back with Mendoza and set out to find the first City of Gold, but they come under attack by a hostile tribe of giant men called the Urubus. After escaping they find an injured girl named Lana, who takes them to her village which floats on an island of reeds upon the waters of Lake Titicaca. Soon, the village is attacked by the Urubus who want to sacrifice Lana to their deity, the Earth goddess Pachamama. Tao crafts a submarine out of two reed canoes and sneak attacks the Urubus' rafts. The Urubus flee, but their chief, Koruka, is captured. Koruka makes a deal to never attack the village again and provides a clue to reach the City of Gold, a place where Pachamama is said to stand guard. Mini-documentary: Lake Titicaca, its agricultural value and the mythology attached to it
17	"The Great Condor"; Transliteration: "Ôgon no dai kondoru (The Great Golden Condor)" (Japanese: 黄金の大コンドル)	21 August 1982 (NHK)	18 January 1984 (France 2); 20 October 1986 (Nickelodeon)
On their way to Pachamama's mountain, the adventurers enter a desert where they encounter Koruka again. He explains that he was banished from his tribe for failing to capture the village and warns that his people are plotting revenge. He tells them to hide in the Valley of the Dead, a place where his people fear to go. When the Urubus find them, they flee into the valley which is lined with dangerous volcanic vents that cover their escape. Eventually, the light of the setting sun leads them to a statue of Pachamama, and placing Esteban and Zia's medallions onto the goddess' breasts triggers a wall to open which reveals the first City of Gold. The gold is only an illusion created by the glow of the setting sun on ordinary stone, but the children discover another treasure, which is a massive golden condor hidden inside a great temple. Mini-documentary: The condor
18	"Maiden Flight of the Great Condor"; Transliteration: "Dai kondoru no himitsu (Secret of The Great Condor)" (Japanese: 大コンドルの秘密)	28 August 1982 (NHK)	25 January 1984 (France 2); 27 October 1986 (Nickelodeon)
The children examine the golden condor and Kokapetl finds a quipu stuck in its beak. Zia translates it by saying that a danger threatened the city and the people fled to the land of the Mayas. After a series of earthquakes, Mendoza realizes that the city is built atop a volcano which appears ready to erupt. Tao believes the condor is a Hiva-built vehicle, like the Solaris, that can help them escape, and when the volcano erupts, the condor is flung into the sky. With seconds before crashing, Esteban uses a sun disk he found in the temple to activate the controls and the incredible condor takes powered flight. Mini-documentary: The physical geography and the ancient monuments of South America
19	"The Nazca Plateau"; Transliteration: "Ubawareta dai kondoru (The Golden Condor, Stolen)" (Japanese: 奪われた大コンドル)	4 September 1982 (NHK)	1 February 1984 (France 2); 3 November 1986 (Nickelodeon)
The condor follows the setting sun and passes over the peculiar Nazca plateau which is covered with massive drawings that can only be seen from the air. When the sun sets, the condor powers down and lands in the middle of a condor drawing. Nearby, Spanish soldiers spot the golden bird and inform Governor Pizarro. The next morning, the children examine the Nazca lines while Pedro and Sancho fiddle with the condor and discover a control stick in the shape of a cobra that can manually steer the bird. Soon Pizarro arrives and captures everyone. He then demands that Esteban give a demonstration of the condor, or sacrifice his friends. Mendoza tells Esteban to go along with the idea, only to use the opportunity for everyone to escape. Mini-documentary: The Nazca lines
20	"The Spaniards' Cannon"; Transliteration: "Aratanaru tabidachi (A New Journey)" (Japanese: 新たなる旅立ち)	11 September 1982 (NHK)	8 February 1984 (France 2); 10 November 1986 (Nickelodeon)
The children fly back to the City of the High Peak to speak to Chief Kraka about the land of the Mayas. Along the way, they spot Gomez's army moving their cannon over a wooden bridge. Esteban dives twice, unsing the flying ship's wings to cut down the bridge. The cannon is, thus, lost in the river. Gomez's forces make it to a waterfall, which hides a secret entrance to the city, and use gunpowder to blast it open. The explosion, however, causes the waterfall to collapse which washes the rest of Gomez's men away. The children land on the city where the seer Myuca tells them to find the Papacamayo of Puna, a priest who journeyed to the land of the Mayas in search of a magical fountain. Zia realizes that the man Myuca speaks of is her father. Mini-documentary: Gold fever in present-day Brazil
21	"The Amazons"; Transliteration: "Midori no makyô Amazones (Amazons of the Green Jungle)" (Japanese: 緑の魔境アマゾネス)	18 September 1982 (NHK)	15 February 1984 (France 2); 17 November 1986 (Nickelodeon)
As the condor flies over the Amazon River, a storm appears and cuts off the sunlight causing the bird to lose power and crash into the jungle. Once down, the adventurers encounter a tribe of warrior women who take them prisoners. They are brought before the priestess Amoro who demands that they be sacrificed in order to appease the rain god. Mendoza explains that Esteban can command the sun to show itself and if he succeeds, their lives should be spared. Overwhelmed, Esteban tries to command the sun, but instead the storm intensifies. Before Amoro can give the order to kill them, the storm suddenly parts and the sun appears just as Esteban had asked. Mini-documentary: The Amazon mainstem and Francisco de Orellana
22	"The Mirror of the Moon"; Transliteration: "Taiyô no ko to ame no kami no majo (The Child of the Sun and the rain god's Witch)" (Japanese: 太陽の子と雨神の魔女)	25 September 1982 (NHK)	22 February 1984 (France 2); 24 November 1986 (Nickelodeon)
The Amazon Queen praises Esteban for bringing out the sun, but Amoro still demands a sacrifice and chooses a young servant girl, named Morka. The children learn that Amoro uses a sacred "rain mask" to foretell storms, but Tao discovers that the device is really a barometer made with knowledge from the Hiva people. Tao sabotages the mask which causes Amoro to make a false prediction that a great tempest will come. When the storm does not arrive, Amoro flees the village in disgrace. Seeking revenge, Amoro returns with a hostile tribe of Indians from up the river. Esteban comes up with a plan to use the Queen's "Mirror of the Moon" to reflect sunlight upon the condor and give it power. He then flies the bird which frightens the hostile natives away. Mini-documentary: The Indian tribes from the Amazonian region and their way of life
23	"The Jade Mask"; Transliteration: "Maya no kami no ikari (Wrath of the Mayan God)" (Japanese: マヤの神の怒り)	2 October 1982 (NHK)	29 February 1984 (France 2); 1 December 1986 (Nickelodeon)
While continuing to the land of the Mayas, the condor malfunctions and falls from the sky. It comes to a hard landing deep inside a pit where a hidden stairway leads to another ancient city. The ruins are abandoned, but Tao finds a statue of a mysterious winged serpent. The writing on the statue leads Tao to a room lined with hieroglyphs and a jade mask. He tries to read the writing which says that the winged serpent is a Mayan god who built a great furnace. Mendoza wonders if the furnace was used to melt gold. When Pedro and Sancho try to steal the jade mask, they unwittingly activate a trap of crushing blocks from which the group narrowly escapes. Mini-documentary: The Maya civilization — comparing Mayan building-style to the Incan one
24	"The Manuscript"; Transliteration: "Hisui kamen no himitsu (Secret of the Jade Mask)" (Japanese: ヒスイ仮面の秘密)	9 October 1982 (NHK)	7 March 1984 (France 2); 8 December 1986 (Nickelodeon)
The children return the next morning to the room with the hieroglyphs and Tao finds writing hidden inside the eyes of the jade mask which leads them to a secret burial chamber. Opening the sarcophagus within, they find a torn piece of manuscript written by the serpent god. Returning to the city, the children find that Mendoza, Pedro and Sancho have been taken prisoner by an unscrupulous Spanish explorer named Dr. Fernando la Guerra, and his assistant Marinche, who takes Tao's gold jar and the manuscript fragment of which she has the other half. With Kokapetl's help, Tao steals back his jar, and the children escape, but become separated again from Mendoza. Mini-documentary: The Mayans of today, in Guatemala
25	"The Lake of Gold"; Transliteration: "Ôgon ningen no matsuri (Festival of the Golden Man)" (Japanese: 黄金人間の祭り)	16 October 1982 (NHK)	14 March 1984 (France 2); 15 December 1986 (Nickelodeon)
The children find a lake fed by an ornate fountain and Zia wonders if it is the one her father was searching for. The lake holds gold treasures at the bottom, and when Esteban tries to fish some out, an angry mob arrives, accusing them of sacrilege. The children are captured and locked up in a temple where they will be sacrificed the next day. Meanwhile, the Doctor and Marinche plot to poison the villagers' water supply and steal the treasures, but Mendoza and his men rig the levees in order to flood the village. The children escape from the flooding temple on an altar made from a boat, and Kokapetl manages to steal back the valuable manuscript for Tao. Mini-documentary: The old sacrifice in Maya culture
26	"The Swamps"; Transliteration: "Hikyô ame no kami no numa (The Rain God's Swamp)" (Japanese: 秘境 雨の神の沼)	23 October 1982 (NHK)	21 March 1984 (France 2); 22 December 1986 (Nickelodeon)
Following the Serpent God's manuscript, the children continue their search for the cities of gold, but the evil Doctor, Marinche and their brute Tatiola are not far behind. When they enter a rocky gully, the Doctor's party is attacked by a giant eagle and falls into a ravine. Mendoza arrives to find the Doctor and his colleagues trapped and offers to help only after the Doctor surrenders his weapon. Afterward, everyone arrives at a prairie which the manuscript says they have to cross. Marinche claims to be too exhausted to continue on and stays behind, but she knows that the adventurers are really entering a dangerous alligator-infested swamp. Mini-documentary: The persistent Mayan Pagan rituals and beliefs in modern times, despite the arrival of Christianity
27	"The Doors of the Night"; Transliteration: "Toketa sha hon no nazo (The Manuscript's Riddle Solved)" (Japanese: 解けた写本の謎)	30 October 1982 (NHK)	28 March 1984 (France 2); 29 December 1986 (Nickelodeon)
Surviving the swamp, the adventurers discover a rock wall where winds howl through a narrow crack. Squeezing through, they come to a cave which leads to the second hidden city that Tao believes was built by the Serpent God. While exploring, Zia is captured by the Doctor and Marinche who then force Tao to translate writing found on a jaguar statue. The writing gives clues to reflect sunlight upon the statue which opens a secret passage to a room containing an idol holding a second manuscript. When the greedy Doctor goes toward the idol, he springs a pit trap and falls in. Tao also pushes Marinche in to join her associate. After reading the second manuscript, Tao learns that there is a third city hidden beyond a forest of statues. Mini-documentary: Tikal
28	"The Forest of Statues"; Transliteration: "Himitsu no dogû no mori (Hidden Forest of the Stone Statues)" (Japanese: 秘密の土偶の森)	6 November 1982 (NHK)	4 April 1984 (France 2); 6 January 1987 (Nickelodeon)
On the search for the forest of statues, the adventurers fashion a raft and head down a river that ends in a dangerous waterfall. Surviving the spill, they find the forest of statues and a hidden cave behind the waterfall that leads to the third city of the Serpent God. Inside, Tao translates the hieroglyphics, but they make no sense and he becomes frustrated. Esteban, however, notices that Tao's wet manuscripts now reveal hidden symbols that spell out another message, which reveals that a city of gold lies beyond a mountain called The Burning Shield. Mini-documentary: Maya astronomy and mathematics
29	"The Burning Shield"; Transliteration: "Nazo no Orumeka jin kichi (Mysterious Olmec Base)" (Japanese: 謎のオルメカ人基地)	13 November 1982 (NHK)	11 April 1984 (France 2); 13 January 1987 (Nickelodeon)
The adventurers find The Burning Shield, a mountain that emits a beam of energy and causes Tao's golden jar to glow, and inside they find a race of goblin-like humanoids who harness the power of a giant crystal with advanced technology. Soon the children are commanded to surrender by a voice that identifies itself as the "God of the Olmecs" and knocks them unconscious with blasts of energy. They wake up later in a laboratory surrounded by the creatures and meet their leader Menator, who wants cells from the children to help slow down his people's aging process. Mendoza comes to their rescue and, after fleeing the mountain, they come to a cliff overlooking the valley. There, Mendoza sees all the cities they have been to and realizes that they have been walking in circles, but he believes it means that the Cities of Gold must be nearby. Mini-documentary: Lake Atitlán, its agricultural value and the mythology attached to it
30	"The Escape"; Transliteration: "Kesshi no dai dassô sakusen (The Great Escape Plan)" (Japanese: 決死の大脱走作戦)	20 November 1982 (NHK)	18 April 1984 (France 2); 20 January 1987 (Nickelodeon)
The Olmecs capture Esteban and his friends again, and Kalmec, the Olmec commander, brings the children before Menator. When a slave girl named Myena brings in Tao's jar, Menator demands to know how to open it, but Tao does not know. Afterward, Mendoza, Pedro and Sancho are put to work in a sewage pit while the children are placed in suspended animation. Mendoza manages to overpower their guard and with Myena's help, he sabotages the Olmecs' crystal machine. During the chaos, he frees the children from the freezing chambers and they eventually reunite with Myena, who shows them how to escape from the mountain. Mini-documentary: Fishing in Michoacán and the "Day of the Dead" Mexican holiday
31	"The Village of the New Sun"; Transliteration: "Atarashî taiyô no mura (The Once and Future Village)" (Japanese: 新しい太陽の村)	27 November 1982 (NHK)	25 April 1984 (France 2); 27 January 1987 (Nickelodeon)
Chased down by the Olmecs, the group faces capture again, but the Olmecs are driven off by a band of Mayans led by Wynococha, Myena's husband-to-be. The Mayans take them to the Village of the New Sun where they are treated with suspicion and locked in a hut. At the Olmec base, three new prisoners are brought to Menator: Dr. Guerra, Marinche and Tatiola, who offer to find the Golden Condor if they are set free. Meanwhile, Myena tells her father, the chief of the village, about the Incan girl Zia and he realizes she is his daughter who was taken away by the Spaniards years ago. Myena runs to inform Zia, but is too late because the children sneak out after overhearing the news that the Olmecs have found the Condor. Mini-documentary: A Maya sacrifice in southern rural Mexico
32	"Attack of the Olmecs"; Transliteration: "Kondoru dakkai sakusen (Plan to Reclaim the Golden Condor)" (Japanese: コンドル奪回作戦)	4 December 1982 (NHK)	2 May 1984 (France 2); 3 February 1987 (Nickelodeon)
The Olmecs mount an attack against the Mayans, and Mendoza meets with Papacamayo (Zia's father) to lend assistance. Meanwhile the children stumble upon two old acquaintances: Gaspard and Gomez. The two do not show hostility and claim they no longer work for Pizarro. When asked about Mendoza, Esteban lies and says that the Olmecs killed him. The two men are surprisingly saddened by the news, saying that Mendoza was an honorable rival, and they also agree to help the children save the Condor from the Olmecs. The children reach the Condor, and with Gomez and Gaspard's help, they manage to lift off. The two men try to hang onto the wing but they fall off, landing in a tree. Esteban then dive bombs the Olmecs who scatter from the battlefield but in the chaos Papacamayo is fatally wounded. Mini-documentary: History of Antigua Guatemala
33	"The Reunion"; Transliteration: "Tachiagatta Maya no tami (The Mayan People Revolt)" (Japanese: 立ち上がったマヤの民)	11 December 1982 (NHK)	9 May 1984 (France 2); 10 February 1987 (Nickelodeon)
The children land the condor and reunite with their friends, but Zia learns Papacamayo has been mortally wounded and she goes to him. On his deathbed, he tells the story of Pizarro invading his village and taking his little daughter as a gift for the Spanish Princess. He also reveals where to find the cities of gold: at the intersection of four lines connected by the three cities of the Serpent God and the Mountain of the Burning Shield. He also warns that there is a great treasure which must not fall into the hands of the Olmecs because they could use it to destroy the world. Elsewhere, Wynococha seeks help from other Mayan villages to form an army against the Olmecs. Mini-documentary: The traditional clothing-style and mask-making in rural Guatemala
34	"Revolt of the Mayas"; Transliteration: "Orumeka kichi sô kôgeki (Attack of the Olmec Base)" (Japanese: オルメカ基地総攻撃)	18 December 1982 (NHK)	16 May 1984 (France 2); 17 February 1987 (Nickelodeon)
The Mayans continue to fight off the Olmecs, and the children fix baskets full of rocks to the Condor to dump on their enemies. Gomez and Gaspard arrive at the village and they try to seize control of the Condor, but the village women overpower them. Meanwhile Mendoza helps the Mayans build European-style siege towers and leads the charge at the base of the Olmecs' mountain. The children take off in the Condor just as Gaspard and Gomez escape from the village and cling to the bottom of it, but they fall off again when the Condor drops its payload of rocks. The surviving Olmecs retreat and the Mayans storm the base, but Menator has a trap waiting for them. Mini-documentary: History of Mexico City
35	"The Olmec Machine"; Transliteration: "Orumeka kichi no himitsu (Secret of the Olmec Base)" (Japanese: オルメカ基地の秘密)	8 January 1983 (NHK)	23 May 1984 (France 2); 24 February 1987 (Nickelodeon)
After landing the Condor, the children are again confronted by Gaspard and Gomez. Believing that the secrets of the cities of gold lie in the Olmec base, they force the children to lead the way inside. Once there, the party encounters a hologram of Menator who leads them into a trap, but soon Mendoza arrives and drives off the guards. During the scuffle, Kalmec abducts Zia and Menator threatens to kill her unless Esteban reveals the location of the Cities of Gold. Esteban reluctantly tells him, but Menator does not free Zia – instead the whole base begins to collapse as Menator escapes in a massive flying machine. The Doctor, Marinche and Tatiola apparently fall to their doom when the walls collapse in on them. Mini-documentary: Angel of Independence, Templo Mayor, "St. James" Catholic church and Lake Xochimilco, in Mexico City
36	"Aerial Pursuit"; Transliteration: "Kyodai heiki to no tatakai (Battle Between Great Weapons)" (Japanese: 巨大兵器との戦い)	15 January 1983 (NHK)	30 May 1984 (France 2); 3 March 1987 (Nickelodeon)
Menator has taken Zia aboard his flying machine and targets the Mayan warriors with a heat ray. Esteban, Tao and Mendoza take flight in the Condor and chase after him. As they close in, Esteban spots a hatch on top of the Olmec craft and makes a heroic leap for it. Tao follows, leaving Mendoza alone to pilot the Condor which he ends up crashing into the jungle. Menator orders his craft to land and his men rush out to search the Condor for survivors, giving Esteban and Tao a chance to slip inside and overpower the Olmec pilots. Tao figures out the controls and flies the machine while Esteban tries to rescue Zia. Once over a lake, Esteban shatters a window and he and Zia leap into the water to escape. Mini-documentary: Aztec pyramids and temples and human sacrifice in Aztec culture
37	"The City of Gold"; Transliteration: "Tobira o hiraku ôgon toshi (Opening the Doors to the City of Gold)" (Japanese: 扉を開く黄金都市)	22 January 1983 (NHK)	6 June 1984 (France 2); 10 March 1987 (Nickelodeon)
Esteban and Zia swim to an island in the middle of the lake. They are found by a mysterious high priest with a golden mask who claims that prophecy foretold of their coming, for they bear the medallions of the sun, which are the keys to the Cities of Gold. Soon the Olmecs arrive and threaten to kill Tao if they are not permitted into the cities. The priest explains that the cities were built underground in order to safeguard the knowledge of the Heva people, because a war was waged thousands of years ago between them and the people of Atlantis. Both cultures built great utopias powered by the sun, but for reasons long forgotten they went to war and destroyed each other with powerful solar weapons. Kalmec claims that the secrets of the cities are needed in order to save his people, but Esteban decides to open the gates in order to save Tao's life. He and Zia place their medallions on the doors which swing open finally revealing a massive City of Gold. Mini-documentary: The subjection of the Aztecs by Hernán Cortés
38	"The Great Legacy"; Transliteration: "Ôgon toshi no kiki (The Great Treasure)" (Japanese: 黄金都市の危機)	29 January 1983 (NHK)	13 June 1984 (France 2); 17 March 1987 (Nickelodeon)
With the gates open, Menator has his flying machine split apart into separate sections – the claws pry the gates open wider, while the top drills a hole into them. When a gap is opened, Mendoza rushes inside and captures Kalmec setting Tao free, but once the gates are destroyed, Menator's machine flies in and reforms itself. Kalmec slips away and runs to find the treasure in the temple, but is stopped by the priest who knows that Kalmec wants the solar unit which powers the city. He offers it willingly but only if Kalmec stands down. Kalmec lowers his saber, but when the priest gets close he stabs him claiming that the Olmecs take what they want. Kalmec finds the solar unit and notices that a component which resembles Tao's golden jar is missing. When Kalmec removes the unit he sets off a security system which opens the dome over the city. A ring of solar panels is deployed which focusses heat beams from the temple onto the Olmec machine and destroys it. Menator survives, and he and Kalmec flee with the solar unit. Esteban and his friends help the wounded priest. Mini-documentary: The true faith, Catholicism, is brought to the Precolumbian population. St. Francis Xavier and his brothers in Christ try to convert the Japanese people.
39	"The End of the City of Gold"; Transliteration: "Aratanaru bôken he (Towards New Adventures)" (Japanese: 新たなる冒険へ)	5 February 1983 (NHK)	20 June 1984 (France 2); 24 March 1987 (Nickelodeon)
Kalmec helps his leader back to the Olmec base, and with the solar unit in hand, he connects it to the Olmec solar reactor and powers it up as Menator dies seconds later from his injuries. Something goes wrong, however, and a meltdown begins. Kalmec is killed in the ensuing upheaval. Earthquakes shake the City of Gold, and the high priest warns that the Olmec reactor must be shut down or it will burn a hole straight into the Earth. To stop it, Tao's golden jar must be inserted into the device. The children go off with the priest to the mountain, but in the meantime Mendoza learns that the priest is an impostor and that the real one died years ago. Instead, the masked man was a traveler who came from the sea, and Mendoza realizes that the man is Esteban's father. Reaching the mountain, the priest continues on alone after bidding Esteban goodbye. As the City of Gold crumbles, Gomez and Gaspard are killed trying to hoard gold. Elsewhere, the priest finds the reactor and inserts the jar. In a flash of energy the machine stops, but the priest's fate is uncertain. In the end, the City of Gold is destroyed, but the children still have the Golden Condor. Esteban, Zia and Tao decide to fly west to find adventure in the Pacific Ocean. In the meantime, Mendoza promises to see Esteban again – perhaps one day in the Barcelona tavern where they first met. Mini-documentary: Recap of the New World's strangeness and exotic elements that fascinated the Europeans. The last explorer to search for the Lost City of Gold ("El Dorado") — Percy Fawcett.

== See also ==
- List of The Mysterious Cities of Gold characters
