= 1985–86 United States network television schedule (daytime) =

The following is the 1985–86 daytime network television schedule for the three major English-language commercial broadcast networks in the United States. It covers the weekday and weekend daytime hours from September 1985 to August 1986.

== Legend ==
- Light yellow indicates talk shows.
- Green indicates soap operas.
- Pink indicates game shows.
- Gold indicates news and public affairs programming.
- Light teal indicates sporting events.
- White indicates local programming.
- Light purple indicates children's programming.
- Gray indicates encore programming (e.g., reruns of prime-time programming).
- New series are highlighted in **bold**.

== Schedule ==
- All times correspond to U.S. Eastern and Pacific Time scheduling (except for some live sports or events). Except where affiliates slot certain programs outside their network-dictated timeslots, subtract one hour for Central, Mountain, Alaska, and Hawaii-Aleutian times.
- Local schedules may differ, as affiliates have the option to pre-empt or delay network programs. Such scheduling may be limited to preemptions caused by local or national breaking news or weather coverage (which may force stations to tape delay certain programs to other timeslots) and any major sports events scheduled to air in a weekday timeslot (mainly during major holidays). Stations may air shows at other times at their preference.

=== Monday–Friday ===
Network		6:00 am	6:30 am	7:00 am	7:30 am	8:00 am	8:30 am	9:00 am	9:30 am	10:00 am	10:30 am	11:00 am	11:30 am	noon	12:30 pm	1:00 pm	1:30 pm	2:00 pm	2:30 pm	3:00 pm	3:30 pm	4:00 pm	4:30 pm	5:00 pm	5:30 pm	6:00 pm	6:30 pm
ABC	Fall	ABC World News This Morning		Good Morning America				Local/syndicated programming				**Three's a Crowd**	All-Star Blitz	Ryan's Hope	Loving	All My Children		One Life to Live		General Hospital		Local/syndicated programming					ABC World News Tonight with Peter Jennings
ABC	Winter	ABC World News This Morning		Good Morning America				Local/syndicated programming				**Bruce Forsyth's Hot Streak**	**New Love, American Style**	Ryan's Hope	Loving	All My Children		One Life to Live		General Hospital		Local/syndicated programming					ABC World News Tonight with Peter Jennings
ABC	Spring	ABC World News This Morning		Good Morning America				Local/syndicated programming				**Lifestyles of the Rich and Famous**	**New Love, American Style**	Ryan's Hope	Loving	All My Children		One Life to Live		General Hospital		Local/syndicated programming					ABC World News Tonight with Peter Jennings
CBS	Fall	CBS Early Morning News		The CBS Morning News				Local/syndicated programming		The $25,000 Pyramid	Press Your Luck	The Price Is Right		Local programming	The Young and the Restless		As the World Turns		Capitol	Guiding Light		Body Language	Local/syndicated programming				CBS Evening News with Dan Rather
CBS	Winter	CBS Early Morning News		The CBS Morning News				Local/syndicated programming		The $25,000 Pyramid	**Card Sharks**	The Price Is Right		Local programming	The Young and the Restless		As the World Turns		Capitol	Guiding Light		Press Your Luck	Local/syndicated programming				CBS Evening News with Dan Rather
NBC	Fall	NBC News at Sunrise		Today				Local/syndicated programming		**Your Number's Up**	Sale of the Century	Wheel of Fortune	Scrabble	Super Password	Search for Tomorrow	Days of Our Lives		Another World		Santa Barbara		Local/syndicated programming					NBC Nightly News with Tom Brokaw
NBC	Winter	NBC News at Sunrise		Today				Local/syndicated programming		Family Ties	Sale of the Century	Wheel of Fortune	Scrabble	Super Password	Search for Tomorrow	Days of Our Lives		Another World		Santa Barbara		Local/syndicated programming					NBC Nightly News with Tom Brokaw

CBS note: CBS returned the 4:00 p.m. time slot to the affiliates beginning September 29, 1986, after Press Your Luck finished its run three days earlier, making CBS the last of the Big Three to return the time slot to affiliates. Many CBS affiliates did not air network programming in the 4:00 p.m. time slot, opting to air local and/or syndicated programming instead.

=== Saturday ===
Network		7:00 am	7:30 am	8:00 am	8:30 am	9:00 am	9:30 am	10:00 am	10:30 am	11:00 am	11:30 am	noon	12:30 pm	1:00 pm	1:30 pm	2:00 pm	2:30 pm	3:00 pm	3:30 pm	4:00 pm	4:30 pm	5:00 pm	5:30 pm	6:00 pm	6:30 pm
ABC	Fall	Local and/or syndicated programming		The Bugs Bunny/Looney Tunes Comedy Hour		**The Ewoks and Droids Adventure Hour**		**The Super Powers Team: Galactic Guardians** ABC Funfit (10:25)	**The 13 Ghosts of Scooby-Doo**	**Scooby's Mystery Funhouse** ABC Funfit (11:25)	The Littles	ABC Weekend Special	College Football on ABC												
ABC	November	Local and/or syndicated programming		Scooby's Mystery Funhouse ABC Funfit (8:25)	The Bugs Bunny/Looney Tunes Comedy Hour		The Ewoks and Droids Adventure Hour		The Super Powers Team: Galactic Guardians ABC Funfit (10:55)	The 13 Ghosts of Scooby-Doo	The Littles	ABC Weekend Special	College Football on ABC												
ABC	Winter	Local and/or syndicated programming		Scooby's Mystery Funhouse ABC Funfit (8:25)	The Bugs Bunny/Looney Tunes Comedy Hour		The Ewoks and Droids Adventure Hour		The Super Powers Team: Galactic Guardians ABC Funfit (10:55)	The 13 Ghosts of Scooby-Doo	The Littles	ABC Weekend Special	American Bandstand		ABC Sports and/or local programming									Local news	ABC World News Saturday
ABC	March	Local and/or syndicated programming		Pink Panther and Sons (R) ABC Funfit (8:25)	The Littles	The Bugs Bunny/Looney Tunes Comedy Hour		Laff-A-Lympics (R)	The Ewoks and Droids Adventure Hour		The Super Powers Team: Galactic Guardians ABC Funfit (11:55)	ABC Weekend Special	American Bandstand		ABC Sports and/or local programming									Local news	ABC World News Saturday
CBS	Fall	Local and/or syndicated programming		**The Berenstain Bears**	**Wuzzles**	Jim Henson's Muppets, Babies & **Monsters**		**Hulk Hogan's Rock 'n' Wrestling**		CBS Storybreak	Dungeons & Dragons	Land of the Lost (R)	The Charlie Brown and Snoopy Show	The Get Along Gang (R)	Pole Position (R)	CBS Sports and/or local programming								Local news	CBS Evening News
CBS	October	Local and/or syndicated programming		**The Berenstain Bears**	**Wuzzles**	Jim Henson's Muppet Babies		**Hulk Hogan's Rock 'n' Wrestling**		CBS Storybreak	Dungeons & Dragons	Land of the Lost (R)	The Charlie Brown and Snoopy Show	The Get Along Gang (R)	Pole Position (R)	CBS Sports and/or local programming								Local news	CBS Evening News
CBS	January	Local and/or syndicated programming		**The Berenstain Bears**	**Wuzzles**	Jim Henson's Muppet Babies		**Hulk Hogan's Rock 'n' Wrestling**		Richie Rich (R) **Astro Minute** (11:28)	Dungeons & Dragons	Pole Position (R)	The Get Along Gang (R)	CBS Sports and/or local programming										Local news	CBS Evening News
CBS	April	Local and/or syndicated programming		Wuzzles	The Berenstain Bears	Jim Henson's Muppet Babies		**Hulk Hogan's Rock 'n' Wrestling**		Richie Rich (R) **Astro Minute** (11:28)	Dungeons & Dragons	Pole Position (R)	The Get Along Gang (R)	CBS Sports and/or local programming										Local news	CBS Evening News
CBS	July	Local and/or syndicated programming		Wuzzles	The Berenstain Bears	Jim Henson's Muppet Babies		**Hulk Hogan's Rock 'n' Wrestling**		Richie Rich (R) **Astro Minute** (11:28)	Dungeons & Dragons	Pole Position (R)	The Charlie Brown and Snoopy Show	CBS Sports and/or local programming										Local news	CBS Evening News
NBC		Local and/or syndicated programming		The Snorks	**Adventures of the Gummi Bears**	The Smurfs			**Punky Brewster**	Alvin and the Chipmunks	Kidd Video	Mister T	Spider-Man and His Amazing Friends (R)	NBC Sports and/or local programming										Local news	NBC Nightly News

In the News aired at the end of CBS' Saturday morning shows except Muppet Babies and CBS Storybreak; CBS would also move the Pacific Time Zone schedule feed for its Saturday Morning lineup from its 8 AM-2 PM (Eastern Time) pattern to the 7 AM-1 PM (Central Time) pattern. Also, the shows past 1PM were removed in January.

One to Grow On aired after the credits of NBC's Saturday morning shows except Punky Brewster and Mister T.

=== Sunday ===
Network		7:00 am	7:30 am	8:00 am	8:30 am	9:00 am	9:30 am	10:00 am	10:30 am	11:00 am	11:30 am	noon	12:30 pm	1:00 pm	1:30 pm	2:00 pm	2:30 pm	3:00 pm	3:30 pm	4:00 pm	4:30 pm	5:00 pm	5:30 pm	6:00 pm	6:30 pm
ABC		Local and/or syndicated programming							This Week with David Brinkley		ABC Sports and/or local programming													Local news	ABC World News Sunday
CBS	Fall	Local and/or syndicated programming				CBS News Sunday Morning			Face the Nation	Local and/or syndicated programming			The NFL Today	NFL on CBS and/or local programming											
CBS	Mid-winter	Local and/or syndicated programming				CBS News Sunday Morning			Face the Nation	Local and/or syndicated programming		CBS Sports and/or local programming												Local news	CBS Evening News
NBC	Fall	Local and/or syndicated programming								Meet the Press	Local and/or syndicated programming		NFL '85	NFL on NBC and local programming											
NBC	Mid-winter	Local and/or syndicated programming								Meet the Press	Local and/or syndicated programming	NBC Sports and/or local programming												Local news	NBC Nightly News

== By network ==
=== ABC ===
**Returning series**

- ABC Funfit
- ABC Weekend Special
- ABC World News This Morning
- ABC World News Tonight with Peter Jennings
- All My Children
- All-Star Blitz
- American Bandstand
- The Bugs Bunny/Looney Tunes Comedy Hour
- General Hospital
- Good Morning America
- Laff-A-Lympics (reruns)
- The Littles
- Loving
- One Life to Live
- Pink Panther and Sons (reruns) (moved from NBC)
- Ryan's Hope
- This Week with David Brinkley

**New series**

- **The 13 Ghosts of Scooby-Doo**
- **Bruce Forsyth's Hot Streak**
- **Ewoks**
- **Fame, Fortune and Romance**
- **Lifestyles of the Rich and Famous**
- **New Love, American Style**
- **Scooby's Mystery Funhouse**
- **Star Wars: Droids**
- **The Super Powers Team: Galactic Guardians**
- **Three's a Crowd** (reruns)

**Not returning from 1984-85**

- Angie (reruns)
- Celebrity Family Feud
- Dragon's Lair
- The Edge of Night
- Family Feud revived in 1988 on CBS
- Mighty Orbots
- The New Scooby-Doo Mysteries
- The Puppy's Great Adventures
- Rubik the Amazing Cube (reruns)
- Scary Scooby Funnies
- Schoolhouse Rock!
- Superfriends: The Legendary Super Powers Show
- Trivia Trap
- Turbo Teen
- Wolf Rock TV

=== CBS ===
**Returning series**

- The $25,000 Pyramid
- As the World Turns
- Body Language
- Capitol
- CBS Evening News
- CBS Morning News
- CBS News Sunday Morning
- CBS Storybreak
- The Charlie Brown and Snoopy Show
- Dungeons & Dragons
- Face the Nation
- The Get Along Gang (reruns)
- Guiding Light
- Jim Henson's Muppet Babies
- Land of the Lost (reruns)
- Pole Position (reruns)
- Press Your Luck
- The Price Is Right
- Richie Rich (reruns)
- The Young and the Restless

**New Series**

- **The Berenstain Bears**
- **Card Sharks**
- **Hulk Hogan's Rock 'n' Wrestling**
- **Little Muppet Monsters**
- **The Wuzzles**

**Not Returning From 1984-85**

- The Biskitts (reruns)
- The Bugs Bunny/Road Runner Show
- Captain Kangaroo
- Pryor's Place
- Saturday Supercade
- Shirt Tales (reruns)

=== NBC ===
**Returning Series**

- Alvin and the Chipmunks
- Another World
- Days of Our Lives
- Kidd Video
- Meet the Press
- Mister T
- NBC News at Sunrise
- NBC Nightly News
- Sale of the Century
- Santa Barbara
- Scrabble
- Search for Tomorrow
- The Smurfs
- The Snorks
- Spider-Man and His Amazing Friends (reruns)
- Super Password
- Today
- Wheel of Fortune

**New Series**

- **Disney's Adventures of the Gummi Bears**
- **Family Ties** (reruns)
- **It's Punky Brewster**
- **Your Number's Up**

**Not Returning From 1984-85**

- The Facts of Life (reruns)
- Going Bananas
- The Incredible Hulk (reruns)
- Pink Panther and Sons (moved to ABC)
- Silver Spoons (reruns)
- Time Machine

== See also ==
- 1985-86 United States network television schedule (prime-time)
- 1985-86 United States network television schedule (late night)

== Sources ==
- https://web.archive.org/web/20071015122215/http://curtalliaume.com/abc_day.html
- https://web.archive.org/web/20071015122235/http://curtalliaume.com/cbs_day.html
- https://web.archive.org/web/20071012211242/http://curtalliaume.com/nbc_day.html
