= 1984–85 United States network television schedule (daytime) =

The following is the 1984–85 daytime network television schedule for the three major English-language commercial broadcast networks in the United States. It covers the weekday and weekend daytime hours from September 1984 to August 1985.

== Legend ==
- Light yellow indicates talk shows.
- Green indicates soap operas.
- Pink indicates game shows.
- Gold indicates news and public affairs programming.
- Light teal indicates sporting events.
- White indicates local programming.
- Light purple indicates children's programming.
- Gray indicates encore programming (e.g., reruns of prime-time programming).
- New series are highlighted in **bold**.

== Schedule ==
- All times correspond to U.S. Eastern and Pacific Time scheduling (except for some live sports or events). Except where affiliates slot certain programs outside their network-dictated timeslots, subtract one hour for Central, Mountain, Alaska, and Hawaii-Aleutian times.
- Local schedules may differ, as affiliates have the option to pre-empt or delay network programs. Such scheduling may be limited to preemptions caused by local or national breaking news or weather coverage (which may force stations to tape delay certain programs to other timeslots) and any major sports events scheduled to air in a weekday timeslot (mainly during major holidays). Stations may air shows at other times at their preference.

=== Monday–Friday ===
Network		6:00 am	6:30 am	7:00 am	7:30 am	8:00 am	8:30 am	9:00 am	9:30 am	10:00 am	10:30 am	11:00 am	11:30 am	noon	12:30 pm	1:00 pm	1:30 pm	2:00 pm	2:30 pm	3:00 pm	3:30 pm	4:00 pm	4:30 pm	5:00 pm	5:30 pm	6:00 pm	6:30 pm
ABC	Fall	ABC World News This Morning		Good Morning America				Local/syndicated programming				Celebrity Family Feud	Loving	Family Feud	Ryan's Hope	All My Children		One Life to Live		General Hospital		The Edge of Night	Local/syndicated programming				ABC World News Tonight with Peter Jennings
ABC	October	ABC World News This Morning		Good Morning America				Local/syndicated programming				**Trivia Trap**	Family Feud	Ryan's Hope	Loving	All My Children		One Life to Live		General Hospital		The Edge of Night	Local/syndicated programming				ABC World News Tonight with Peter Jennings
ABC	Winter	ABC World News This Morning		Good Morning America				Local/syndicated programming				**Trivia Trap**	Family Feud	Ryan's Hope	Loving	All My Children		One Life to Live		General Hospital		Local/syndicated programming					ABC World News Tonight with Peter Jennings
ABC	Spring	ABC World News This Morning		Good Morning America				Local/syndicated programming				**All-Star Blitz**	Family Feud	Ryan's Hope	Loving	All My Children		One Life to Live		General Hospital		Local/syndicated programming					ABC World News Tonight with Peter Jennings
ABC	Summer	ABC World News This Morning		Good Morning America				Local/syndicated programming				**Angie**	All-Star Blitz	Ryan's Hope	Loving	All My Children		One Life to Live		General Hospital		Local/syndicated programming					ABC World News Tonight with Peter Jennings
CBS		CBS Early Morning News		The CBS Morning News				Local/syndicated programming		The $25,000 Pyramid	Press Your Luck	The Price Is Right		Local/syndicated programming	The Young and the Restless		As the World Turns		Capitol	Guiding Light		Body Language	Local/syndicated programming				CBS Evening News with Dan Rather
NBC	Fall	NBC News at Sunrise		Today				Local/syndicated programming		The Facts of Life	Sale of the Century	Wheel of Fortune	Scrabble	**Super Password**	Search for Tomorrow	Days of Our Lives		Another World		Santa Barbara		Local/syndicated programming					NBC Nightly News with Tom Brokaw
NBC	Winter	NBC News at Sunrise		Today				Local/syndicated programming		**Time Machine**	Sale of the Century	Wheel of Fortune	Scrabble	**Super Password**	Search for Tomorrow	Days of Our Lives		Another World		Santa Barbara		Local/syndicated programming					NBC Nightly News with Tom Brokaw
NBC	Spring	NBC News at Sunrise		Today				Local/syndicated programming		The Facts of Life	Sale of the Century	Wheel of Fortune	Scrabble	**Super Password**	Search for Tomorrow	Days of Our Lives		Another World		Santa Barbara		Local/syndicated programming					NBC Nightly News with Tom Brokaw
NBC	Summer	NBC News at Sunrise		Today				Local/syndicated programming		**Silver Spoons**	Sale of the Century	Wheel of Fortune	Scrabble	**Super Password**	Search for Tomorrow	Days of Our Lives		Another World		Santa Barbara		Local/syndicated programming					NBC Nightly News with Tom Brokaw

ABC note: The Edge of Night aired its final episode on December 28, 1984. Afterwards, ABC rescinded the 4:00 pm time slot to its local stations. Many affiliates had already dropped the show by the time it was canceled.

=== Saturday ===
Network		7:00 am	7:30 am	8:00 am	8:30 am	9:00 am	9:30 am	10:00 am	10:30 am	11:00 am	11:30 am	noon	12:30 pm	1:00 pm	1:30 pm	2:00 pm	2:30 pm	3:00 pm	3:30 pm	4:00 pm	4:30 pm	5:00 pm	5:30 pm	6:00 pm	6:30 pm
ABC	Fall	Local and/or syndicated programming		The Puppy's Great Adventures Schoolhouse Rock! (8:25)	Superfriends: The Legendary Super Powers Show	**Mighty Orbots**	**Turbo Teen** **ABC Funfit** (9:55)	**Dragon's Lair** **ABC Funfit** (10:25)	**Wolf Rock TV**	The New Scooby-Doo Mysteries	The Littles	ABC Weekend Special	College Football on ABC												
ABC	October	Local and/or syndicated programming		The Puppy's Great Adventures Schoolhouse Rock! (8:25)	Superfriends: The Legendary Super Powers Show	**Mighty Orbots**	Turbo Teen Schoolhouse Rock! (9:55)	Dragon's Lair Schoolhouse Rock! (10:25)	The New Scooby-Doo Mysteries	**Scary Scooby Funnies** Schoolhouse Rock! (11:25)	The Littles	ABC Weekend Special	College Football on ABC												
ABC	December	Local and/or syndicated programming		Superfriends: The Legendary Super Powers Show Schoolhouse Rock! (8:55)		**Mighty Orbots**	Turbo Teen Schoolhouse Rock! (9:55)	Dragon's Lair Schoolhouse Rock! (10:25)	The New Scooby-Doo Mysteries	**Scary Scooby Funnies** Schoolhouse Rock! (11:25)	The Littles	ABC Weekend Special	American Bandstand		ABC Sports and/or local programming									Local news	ABC World News Saturday
ABC	May	Local and/or syndicated programming		Superfriends: The Legendary Super Powers Show Schoolhouse Rock! (8:55)		**Mighty Orbots**	Turbo Teen Schoolhouse Rock! (9:55)	Rubik, the Amazing Cube (R) Schoolhouse Rock! (10:25)	The New Scooby-Doo Mysteries	**Scary Scooby Funnies** Schoolhouse Rock! (11:25)	The Littles	ABC Weekend Special	American Bandstand		ABC Sports and/or local programming									Local news	ABC World News Saturday
CBS	Fall	Local and/or syndicated programming	Captain Kangaroo	Shirt Tales (R)	**The Get Along Gang**	**Jim Henson's Muppet Babies**	Saturday Supercade		**Pole Position**	Dungeons & Dragons	**Pryor's Place**	The Bugs Bunny/Road Runner Show			The Charlie Brown and Snoopy Show	CBS Sports and/or local programming								Local news	CBS Evening News
CBS	Winter	Local and/or syndicated programming		Shirt Tales (R)	**The Get Along Gang**	**Jim Henson's Muppet Babies**	Dungeons & Dragons	The Bugs Bunny/Road Runner Show			**Pryor's Place**	Saturday Supercade		Pole Position	The Charlie Brown and Snoopy Show	CBS Sports and/or local programming								Local news	CBS Evening News
CBS	Spring	Local and/or syndicated programming		The Biskitts	**The Get Along Gang**	**Jim Henson's Muppet Babies**	Dungeons & Dragons	The Bugs Bunny/Road Runner Show (parts 1 & 2)		**CBS Storybreak**	**Pryor's Place**	The Bugs Bunny/Road Runner Show (part 3)	Saturday Supercade		Pole Position	CBS Sports and/or local programming								Local news	CBS Evening News
CBS	Summer	Local and/or syndicated programming		The Biskitts	**The Get Along Gang**	**Jim Henson's Muppet Babies**	Dungeons & Dragons	The Bugs Bunny/Road Runner Show (parts 1 & 2)		**CBS Storybreak**	Land of the Lost (R)	The Bugs Bunny/Road Runner Show (part 3)	Saturday Supercade		Pole Position	CBS Sports and/or local programming								Local news	CBS Evening News
NBC	Fall	Local and/or syndicated programming		**The Snorks**	**Pink Panther and Sons**	The Smurfs			Alvin and the Chipmunks	**Kidd Video**	Mister T	**Going Bananas**	Spider-Man and His Amazing Friends (R)	NBC Sports and/or local programming										Local news	NBC Nightly News
NBC	Winter	Local and/or syndicated programming		**The Snorks**	**Pink Panther and Sons**	The Smurfs			Alvin and the Chipmunks	**Kidd Video**	Mister T	Spider-Man and His Amazing Friends (R)	The Incredible Hulk (R)	NBC Sports and/or local programming										Local news	NBC Nightly News

In the News aired at the end of most of CBS' Saturday morning shows (exceptions included Muppet Babies and CBS Storybreak).

One to Grow On aired after the credits of NBC's Saturday morning shows except Mister T and two other shows.

=== Sunday ===
Network		7:00 am	7:30 am	8:00 am	8:30 am	9:00 am	9:30 am	10:00 am	10:30 am	11:00 am	11:30 am	noon	12:30 pm	1:00 pm	1:30 pm	2:00 pm	2:30 pm	3:00 pm	3:30 pm	4:00 pm	4:30 pm	5:00 pm	5:30 pm	6:00 pm	6:30 pm
ABC		Local and/or syndicated programming							This Week with David Brinkley		ABC Sports and/or local programming													Local news	ABC World News Sunday
CBS	Fall	Local and/or syndicated programming	Captain Kangaroo	Local and/or syndicated programming		CBS News Sunday Morning			Face the Nation	Local and/or syndicated programming			The NFL Today	NFL on CBS and/or local programming											
CBS	Mid-winter	Local and/or syndicated programming				CBS News Sunday Morning			Face the Nation	Local and/or syndicated programming		CBS Sports and/or local programming												Local news	CBS Evening News
NBC	Fall	Local and/or syndicated programming										Meet the Press	NFL '84	NFL on NBC and local programming											
NBC	Mid-winter	Local and/or syndicated programming										Meet the Press	NBC Sports and/or local programming											Local news	NBC Nightly News

== By network ==
=== ABC ===
**Returning series**

- ABC Weekend Special
- ABC World News This Morning
- ABC World News Tonight with Peter Jennings
- All My Children
- American Bandstand
- Celebrity Family Feud
- The Edge of Night
- Family Feud
- General Hospital
- Good Morning America
- The Littles
- Loving
- The New Scooby-Doo Mysteries
- One Life to Live
- The Puppy's Great Adventures
- Rubik, the Amazing Cube (reruns)
- Ryan's Hope
- Schoolhouse Rock!
- This Week with David Brinkley

**New Series**

- **ABC Funfit**
- **All-Star Blitz**
- **Angie** (reruns)
- **Dragon's Lair**
- **Mighty Orbots**
- **Scary Scooby Funnies**
- **Superfriends: The Legendary Super Powers Show**
- **Trivia Trap**
- **Turbo Teen**
- **Wolf Rock TV**

**Not Returning From 1983-84**

- Benson (reruns)
- The Best of Scooby-Doo
- The Love Report
- Menudo on ABC
- The Monchhichis/Little Rascals/Richie Rich Show
- The New Scooby and Scrappy-Doo Show (Retooled into The New Scooby-Doo Mysteries)
- Pac-Man

=== CBS ===
**Returning Series**

- The $25,000 Pyramid
- As the World Turns
- The Biskitts (reruns)
- Body Language
- The Bugs Bunny/Road Runner Show
- Capitol
- Captain Kangaroo
- CBS Evening News
- CBS Morning News
- CBS News Sunday Morning
- The Charlie Brown and Snoopy Show
- Dungeons & Dragons
- Face the Nation
- Guiding Light
- Land of the Lost (reruns)
- Press Your Luck
- The Price Is Right
- Saturday Supercade
- Shirt Tales (reruns)
- The Young and the Restless

**New Series**

- **CBS Storybreak**
- **The Get Along Gang**
- **Jim Henson's Muppet Babies**
- **Pole Position**
- **Pryor's Place**

**Not Returning From 1983-84**

- Benji, Zax & the Alien Prince (reruns)
- CBS Children's Film Festival
- The Dukes
- Gilligan's Planet (reruns)
- Meatballs and Spaghetti (reruns)
- The New Fat Albert Show
- Plastic Man (reruns)
- Tarzan, Lord of the Jungle (reruns)
- Tattletales

=== NBC ===
**Returning Series**

- Alvin and the Chipmunks
- Another World
- Days of Our Lives
- The Facts of Life (reruns)
- The Incredible Hulk (reruns)
- Meet the Press
- Mister T
- NBC News at Sunrise
- NBC Nightly News
- Sale of the Century
- Santa Barbara
- Scrabble
- Search for Tomorrow
- The Smurfs
- Spider-Man and His Amazing Friends (reruns)
- Today
- Wheel of Fortune

**New Series**

- **Going Bananas**
- **Kidd Video**
- **Pink Panther and Sons**
- **Silver Spoons** (reruns)
- **The Snorks**
- **Super Password**
- **Time Machine**

**Not Returning From 1983-84**

- Diff'rent Strokes (reruns)
- Dream House
- Fantasy
- The Flintstone Funnies
- GO
- Hot Potato
- Match Game-Hollywood Squares Hour
- Shirt Tales
- Thundarr the Barbarian (reruns)

== See also ==
- 1984-85 United States network television schedule (prime-time)
- 1984-85 United States network television schedule (late night)

== Sources ==
- https://web.archive.org/web/20071015122215/http://curtalliaume.com/abc_day.html
- https://web.archive.org/web/20071015122235/http://curtalliaume.com/cbs_day.html
- https://web.archive.org/web/20071012211242/http://curtalliaume.com/nbc_day.html
