= John Davidson (entertainer) =

American entertainer

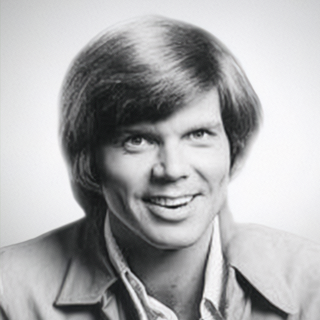
- Davidson on the TV series The Girl with Something Extra (1973)
- Born: John Hamilton Davidson; December 13, 1941 (age 84); Pittsburgh, Pennsylvania, U.S.
- Education: Denison University
- Occupations: Actor; singer; game show host
- Years active: 1958–present
- Notable credits: The Girl with Something Extra (1973-1974); That's Incredible! (1980-1984); Time Machine (1985); Hollywood Squares (1986-1989); The $100,000 Pyramid (1991)
- Spouses: Jackie Miller (m. 1969; div. 1982) Rhonda Rivera (m. 1983)
- Children: 3
- Website: Official website

John Hamilton Davidson (born December 13, 1941) is an American actor, singer, and game show host known for hosting Time Machine, Hollywood Squares, and That's Incredible! in the 1980s, and a revival of The $100,000 Pyramid in 1991.

== Early life and education ==
Davidson was born to Dr. James Allie Davidson (1908–1984) and Elizabeth Emma Beck (1908–1996), both Baptist ministers, in Pittsburgh, Pennsylvania. He lived in West Bridgewater, Massachusetts and graduated from White Plains High School in White Plains, New York and then entered Denison University.

== Career ==
Davidson considered following in his parents' footsteps, but ultimately decided that he "would rather sing about love than preach it."

Davidson worked in situation comedies, game shows, variety shows, and talk shows. In 1964 he appeared in the Hallmark Hall of Fame presentation of The Fantasticks with Ricardo Montalbán and Susan Watson. In the summer of 1966, he was the host of two prime-time variety hour shows, The Kraft Summer Music Hall and The John Davidson Show, the latter of which included George Carlin and Richard Pryor. In the 1980s he became well known for co-hosting That's Incredible! (1980–84), a human-interest/stunt-themed series.

In 1967, Davidson made his film debut in The Happiest Millionaire, alongside Lesley Ann Warren and Fred MacMurray. The following year he appeared with Warren again in The One and Only, Genuine, Original Family Band. He appeared as a guest singer on The Carol Burnett Show in 1967 and 1969, and as the Mystery Guest on What's My Line? in 1969. His career was managed by Alan Bernard, former manager of Andy Williams and one of the partners in BNB, the largest personal management firm in the 1970s.

In 1987, during an appearance on Scrabble he mentioned that he appeared as an underwear model in the 1959 Sears catalog, when he was seventeen. He made his Broadway debut in the 1964 production of Foxy, which starred Bert Lahr. He also appeared in State Fair in 1996.

He was a member of the repertory company on the short-lived CBS variety show The Entertainers (1964–65). He was a regular player on many anthology and variety series of the 1970s–80s, including The Ed Sullivan Show, The Sonny & Cher Comedy Hour, Love American Style, The Love Boat, Fantasy Island, and Spenser: For Hire.

Davidson made numerous appearances on the original Hollywood Squares, from the game show's premiere in 1966 to its cancellation in 1981. He was known for his long-winded bluffs which often fooled contestants with his often ridiculous answers to questions posed by the program's host, Peter Marshall. Most times, Marshall could barely conceal a grin as Davidson began far-fetched but plausible explanations for his answers, often prefaced with a misleading statement like "I just read about it in the New England Journal of Medicine, it was a fascinating study, and it said...". Davidson relayed the stories with such sincerity that contestants were often fooled.

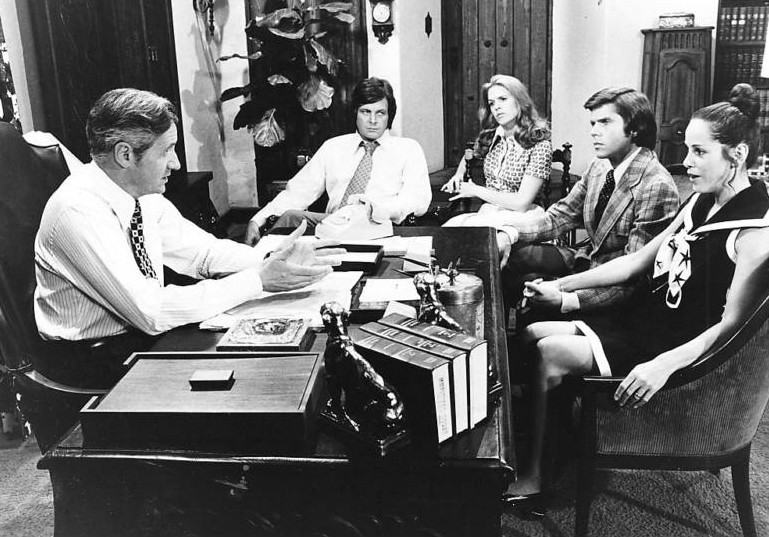
From left: Arthur Hill, Michael Witney, Sharon Gless, Davidson and Louise Sorel on ABC's Owen Marshall, Counselor at Law (1972)

In 1973 and 1974, he starred with Sally Field on the situation comedy The Girl with Something Extra. In 1974 he guest-starred on the television series The Streets of San Francisco, in the episode "Mask of Death", portraying a cross-dressing lounge singer who murders his/her fans. In the episode, Davidson sings in drag while impersonating such notables as Carol Channing, singing "Diamonds Are a Girl's Best Friend". Also in 1974, the singer posed near-nude (with a discreetly placed towel) for the magazine Cosmopolitan.

In 1977, Davidson was present at the Beverly Hills Supper Club fire in Southgate, Kentucky. He was expected to appear onstage as the headline act the evening the fire broke out. Davidson helped others escape before fleeing through a back door. Davidson's music director, Douglas Herro, was among the 165 victims. Davidson was unharmed in the disaster and later participated in a charity concert to raise funds for the families of the victims.

In the late 1970s, the actor appeared 87 times as a regular guest host on The Tonight Show Starring Johnny Carson. In the early 1980s he hosted his own talk show, produced by Westinghouse Broadcasting/Group W, after it canceled The Mike Douglas Show. The John Davidson Show aired daily in syndication from 1980 to 1982. In 1985, he hosted the NBC daytime game show Time Machine.

Davidson appeared as a host on real estate promoter Dave Del Dotto’s paid programs during the late 1980s and early 1990s, which were notable for taking place in outdoor, scenic settings (such as Hawaii). These "infomercials", as they have come to be called, often appeared on late night television and were a staple for years on many cable channels until the Federal Trade Commission filed a complaint against Del Dotto in 1995, alleging that he had "made false and unsubstantiated representations" in his programs.

Davidson hosted a revival of Hollywood Squares which ran from 1986 to 1989. He also hosted 170 episodes of a revival of The $100,000 Pyramid in 1991. He also appeared as a featured guest on The Carpenters' television specials Space Encounters (1978) and Music! Music! Music! (1980). Following his run on Hollywood Squares, he was one of six people who auditioned to host the CBS daytime version of Wheel of Fortune (in the end, Bob Goen was hired).

== Recording career ==
Davidson was also a successful recording artist. He recorded twelve albums in the '60s and '70s. From 1966 to 1971, he recorded for Columbia Records, where he enjoyed his greatest success. Five of his albums reached the Billboard 200 album charts, with The Time of My Life! peaking at No. 19 in 1966. His albums usually consisted of covers of recent hit singles along with some new material.

In 1969, his self-titled album was released. Produced by Tim O'Brien, the UK release was reviewed in the 16 August issue of New Musical Express. The songs on the album were, "Stormy", "Little Green Apples", "Words", "I've Gotta Be Me", "Goodnight My Love", "Those Were the Days", "Didn't We", "Both Sides Now" and "Suzanne". The review was warm with the reviewer saying that he will improve if he sticks to it.

As a singles artist, he placed seven records on the Adult Contemporary chart. "Everytime I Sing a Love Song", released in 1976, peaked at No. 7, his most successful single.

=== Discography ===
==== Albums ====
Year	Album	US BB	Label
1964	The Young Warm Sound of John Davidson	–	Colpix
1966	The Time of My Life!	19	Columbia
1967	My Best to You	125	Columbia
1967	A Kind of Hush	79	Columbia
1968	Goin' Places	151	Columbia
1969	My Cherie Amour	–	Columbia
1969	John Davidson	153	Columbia
1969	My Christmas Favorites	–	Columbia
1970	Everything is Beautiful	–	Columbia
1973	... Well, Here I Am	–	Mercury
1974	Touch Me	–	20th Century Records
1976	Everytime I Sing a Love Song	–	20th Century Records

== Film career ==
Davidson acted in many movies, including The Happiest Millionaire (1967), The One and Only, Genuine, Original Family Band (1968), Coffee, Tea or Me? (1973), The Concorde... Airport '79 (1979), Dallas Cowboys Cheerleaders II, (1980) and Edward Scissorhands (1990).

== Stage work ==
Davidson has appeared in productions of A Funny Thing Happened on the Way to the Forum, Kismet, State Fair, Man of La Mancha, Chicago, and The Will Rogers Follies, at the Surflight Theatre in Long Beach Island, New Jersey. He has also performed the autobiographical play Father/Son and Holy Ghost, about his relationship with his father, who was a minister.

In July 1991 Davidson appeared in summer stock with Sacramento Music Circus of Sacramento, California in The Music Man alongside Susan Watson, Richard Paul, Carol Swarbrick, and the Delta Music Society Quartet of Sacramento.

Davidson performed daily in 1993–94 in Branson, Missouri at a theater bearing his name.

In May 1999, Davidson and Stephanie Mills joined the cast of the Chicago company of Ragtime as the Father and Sarah, respectively.

In late 2011 Davidson was listed as a guest star with The Fabulous Palm Springs Follies at the Plaza Theatre in Palm Springs, California.

In June 2012 Davidson took on the role of Henry in the off-Broadway revival of The Fantasticks. In April 2013 he took on the role of the Wizard in the first North American tour of Wicked. In 2016, Davidson played Norman Thayer in On Golden Pond at Judson Theatre Company in Pinehurst, North Carolina. In June 2017, he took on the role of Charles Frohman/Captain James Hook in the North American tour of Finding Neverland.

== Personal life ==
Davidson's first marriage was to Jackie Miller. He has two children: John Davidson, Jr., who often appeared with his father on later versions of Hollywood Squares; and Jennifer (Davidson) Kane. Davidson has been married to former backup singer Rhonda Rivera since 1983; they have a daughter, Ashleigh Davidson. They live primarily in Tamworth, New Hampshire.

The son of two Baptist ministers, Davidson now identifies as an atheist, declaring himself "openly secular" in a video for the Openly Secular Coalition begun by the Richard Dawkins Foundation for Reason and Science, the Secular Coalition for America, and other humanist groups.

== Sources ==
- Dorff, Steve "What Went Wrong?, Episode 9: Interview with John Davidson", WorldPress.com, January 4, 2009; accessed February 28, 2012.

Media offices
Preceded by Dick Clark	Host of Pyramid; 1991	Succeeded by Donny Osmond
Preceded by Jon Bauman in the Match Game-Hollywood Squares Hour (1983–1984)	"Square-Master" (Host) of Hollywood Squares; 1986–1989	Succeeded by Tom Bergeron in the 1998–2004 version
