= A Little TLC =

"A Little TLC" (a.k.a. "TLC") is a song written by Lynsey de Paul and Terry Britten, about needing tender loving care. The song is registered with the ISWC as well as MusicBrainz and it has been recorded and released by a number of artists.

== Marlene version ==
The first version of the song was recorded and released by Philippine born, Japanese soul singer Marlene de la Peña but more commonly referred to as "Marlene" (who known in the US primarily for her work with Seawind), where it was one of the tracks on her jazz/soul/funk album Looking for Love, recorded in Los Angeles and released on CBS/Sony in 1984. The album was re-issued on CD with the song featuring as track 8 on CD on 25 July 1991, and again on 8 November 2017 on Sony Records International.

== Kidd Video version ==
The band behind the children's real life/animation combination television show Kidd Video, played their version of the song on the TV show with lead vocals sung by Bryan Scott as the character "Kidd Video" at the end of the first episode of the series in September 1984. It was also featured as last song in the final episode of the series "Who's in the Kitchen with Dinah?" transmitted on December 7, 1985.

The song was also featured as a track on the 1986 album The T.V. Show Hits, that was credited to 'Kidd Video' and produced by Shuki Levy and Haim Saban. The album was released both as a vinyl album and on cassette by the CBS label. The band reportedly toured Israel to support the release of the album in 1987. A different version of the song recorded with Hebrew lyrics by Moti Dacha with the title "Father (Simple Love)" was released on the album Kid Video - Hits and Stories from the TV Show, 1986 in 1986. The song still receives radio plays in the U.S.

== Sam Hui' award winning version ==
Hong Kong actor and singer Samuel Hui (Sam Hui) recorded a Chinese version of the song entitled 心思思 "Xin Si Si" (translated as "Mind thinking"). Both the Cantonese and English language versions of the song were featured in his 1986 action movie Aces Go Places IV a.k.a. Mad Mission 4: You Never Die Twice,. The Cantonese lyrics were written by Lin Zhenqiang and the song was one of the 1986 RTHK Top 10 Gold Songs. It won the ninth annual ten Chinese Golden Melody Awards. The song was awarded "Best Original Film Song" at the second Hong Kong Film Awards. It was the lead track of his album Live In Hong Kong, and was a track on his 1986 album Re Li Zhi Guan (Crown of Heat"). A remix of the song was released on the 1987 Sam Hui album Xin Qu Yu Jing Xuan, and more recently was included on the CD, Nan Wan Hsu Guan Jie Sam Hui 30 Nian (30 Years of Hits from Sam Hui). It was certified platinum in Hong Kong. An instrumental cover version of the song was released by The Shaolin Band, also in 1986. Hui also recorded and released a Japanese version of the song with the title "ラブ・シック"(Love Sick) The song has been included on various compilation albums.

Hui, together with another Cantopop legend Alan Tam, performed the song as part of their 2018–2019 "Happy Together World Tour" and it was included on their 6 CD collection "The Kings of Polygram: Sam & Tam 101 that was released in 2017.

== Menudo version ==
Boy band Menudo from Puerto Rico, released their version entitled "TLC" on their first English language US album Sons of Rock, which was produced by Papo Gely. It was released in 1988 with Ricky Martin as the lead singer of the song, and it was one of the songs played on their successful 1989 Sons of Rock tour.

== Lynsey de Paul version ==
De Paul's own version of "A Little TLC" was recorded during the same sessions for her 1994 album Just a Little Time, but the song was not selected as one of the album's tracks. It was finally released on the official Lynsey de Paul Music Store and is also on YouTube.

== Classic Pat version ==
The most recent recording of "A Little TLC" was in a more alternative rock style and released by Classic Pat (also known as Patrick McVay) on his album of covers of 'The TV Show Hits' by Kidd Video, entitled Why Not Volume 3 on Patrock Records, on 4 October 2024. This version is available on Spotify and YouTube.
