= Johnny Haymer =

American actor (1920–1989)

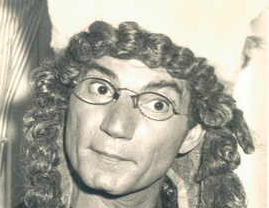
- Johnny Haymer in 1963
- Born: Haymer Lionel Flieg; January 19, 1920; St. Louis, Missouri, U.S.
- Died: November 18, 1989 (aged 69); Los Angeles, California, U.S.
- Years active: 1956–1989
- Spouse: Helyn Sylvia Graff Haymer (m. 1949)
- Children: 3

Haymer Lionel Flieg (January 19, 1920 – November 18, 1989), known professionally as Johnny Haymer, was an American actor known for his role as Staff Sergeant Zelmo Zale, a recurring character in the television series M*A*S*H. He appeared in a 1965 episode of The Cara Williams Show and was an announcer for the game show Your Number's Up hosted by Nipsey Russell; in the mid-1980s he provided his voice for the characters Swindle, Vortex, Highbrow, and Caliburst in The Transformers. He played Walter Pinkerton from 1982 to 1983 on Madame's Place and appeared in the penultimate episode of the original Star Trek series, "All Our Yesterdays". He played the crooked fight promoter Moriarty in "The Wild Wild West" S3 E18 "The Night of the Viper" which aired on 1 October 1968.

Haymer additionally made brief television appearances in other popular series, including The Incredible Hulk Season 2 episode fourteen "Haunted", a shot down general in Hogan's Heroes, a police officer on The Facts of Life episode "Under Pressure" in 1983, and as a commissioner on The Golden Girls episode "It's a Miserable Life" in 1986.

Haymer appeared in television commercials for Standard Shoes stores during the 1980s.

== Personal life ==
Haymer was born Haymer Lionel Flieg in St. Louis, Missouri, the son of Jewish immigrants. He graduated from the University of Missouri in 1942, majoring in speech and specializing in dramatic impressions. He died in Los Angeles, of cancer on November 18, 1989, aged 69.

== Filmography ==
Year	Title	Role	Notes
1968	The Secret War of Harry Frigg	Sgt. Pozzallo	
1971	Evel Knievel	Rodeo cook	
1971	The Organization	John Bishop	
1976	The Four Deuces	Ben Arlen - the 'Deuce of Hearts'	
1976	Logan's Run		Uncredited
1977	Annie Hall	Comic	
1977	Herbie Goes to Monte Carlo	Race Official	
1978	American Hot Wax	Song Plugger	
1979	Real Life	Dr. Maxwell Rennert	
1979	...And Justice for All	Crenna	
1987	Open House	Paul Bernal	

== Television ==
Year	Title	Role	Notes
1956–1957	Stanley	Jack / Jerry	2 episodes
1963	The DuPont Show of the Week	Mickey Mandel	1 episode Credited as Johnny Baymer
1965	The Cara Williams Show	Crane	1 episode
1965	Honey West	Rodriguez	1 episode
1966	The Dick Van Dyke Show	Sam	1 episode Credited as John Haymer
1966	The Girl From U.N.C.L.E	Joey the Clown	1 episode
1966	Pistols 'n' Petticoats	Etienne LaVoissiere	1 episode
1967	Captain Nice	Dr. Von Keppel	1 episode
1967	Tarzan	Dawkins	1 episode credited as John Haymer
1967	He & She	Edward J. Flanagan	1 episode
1967	The Second Hundred Years	Astin	1 episode
1968	The Wild Wild West	Moriarity	S3, E18, "The Night of the Vipers"
1968	Premiere	Brown	1 episode
1968	Gunsmoke	Ned Stallcup	1 episode
1968	My Three Sons	Mr. X	1 episode
1969	Star Trek: The Original Series	The Constable	S3:E23, "All Our Yesterdays"
1969	Get Smart	Nova	1 episode
1969	The Governor & J.J.	Pierre Picard	1 episode 1971 Hogan’s Heroes General Sharp 1 episode
1974–1979	M*A*S*H	SSgt. Zelmo Zale	20 episodes
