= The John Davidson Show =

American syndicated television talk show

- Genre: Talk show Variety show
- Directed by: Ron de Moraes
- Presented by: John Davidson
- Country of origin: United States
- Original language: English
- No. of seasons: 2

Production
- Executive producer: Frank Brill
- Producer: Vince Calandra
- Production locations: Los Angeles, California
- Running time: 60–90 minutes
- Production company: Group W Productions

Original release
- Network: Syndicated
- Release: June 30, 1980 – August 27, 1982

The John Davidson Show Is an American syndicated daytime talk show and variety show hosted by John Davidson. Produced by Group W Productions, the program premiered on June 30, 1980, as Group W's successor to The Mike Douglas Show. It ran for two seasons before Group W discontinued production in 1982.

== History ==
Group W developed The John Davidson Show as its new syndicated daytime talk-variety program after deciding to end its long association with Mike Douglas. Davidson signed a five-year contract reportedly worth $7.5 million to host the program. Group W promoted Davidson as the successor to Douglas as the company's principal syndicated daytime talk-show host.

More than 70 stations had cleared the program before its premiere, with both 60- and 90-minute versions offered to stations. The series premiered on June 30, 1980, with actress Linda Gray serving as Davidson's first weekly co-host. Guests on the premiere included Tom Wopat, Michael Keaton, The Temptations, Olympic hockey player Jim Craig, radio personality Gary Burbank and fitness instructor Judi Sheppard Missett.

Like The Mike Douglas Show, the program used a weekly guest co-host format. Early co-hosts included Gray, Bonnie Franklin, Robert Hays, Pat Harrington Jr., Karen Grassle and Lynn Redgrave. The program combined celebrity interviews, musical performances, comedy and discussions of topical subjects. Guests during its run included Ringo Starr, Roger Moore, Charlton Heston, Brooke Shields, Kool & the Gang, Billy Preston, Valerie Harper, James Coco and Isabel Sanford.

Frank Brill served as executive producer, Vince Calandra as producer and Ron de Moraes as director.

== Cancellation ==
In early 1982, Group W announced that it would discontinue The John Davidson Show after two seasons. Edwin T. Vane, president and chief executive officer of Group W Productions, attributed the decision primarily to a "dramatic change in marketing conditions". The number of desirable time periods available for syndicated entertainment programs had declined as television stations expanded locally produced news and information programming, while production costs were increasing.

The cancellation was announced shortly before the television industry's annual NATPE convention, leaving stations carrying Davidson's program seeking replacement programming for the following season. Production ended in 1982, with delayed broadcasts scheduled to continue through August 27.
