= The Mike Douglas Show =

American daytime television talk show

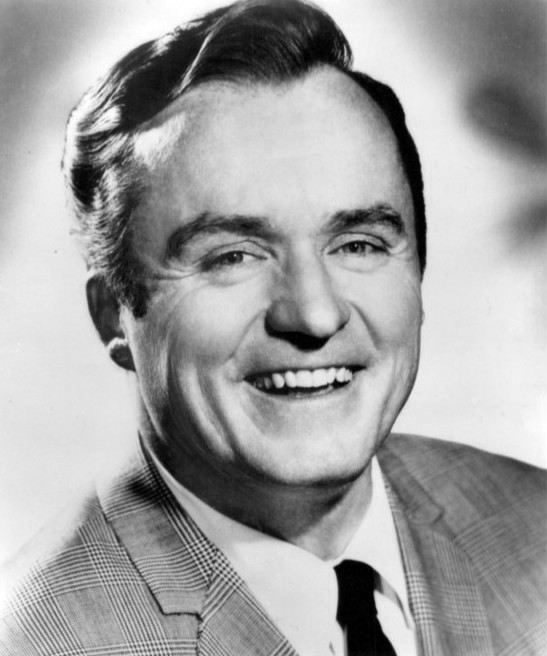
- Douglas in 1966
- Also known as: The Mike Douglas Entertainment Hour (1981)
- Genre: Talk/Variety
- Presented by: Mike Douglas
- Narrated by: Jay Stewart (1978); Charlie Tuna (1978–1981)
- Opening theme: "Here's Mike" (1961–1979) "Mike Makes Your Day!" (1979–1981)
- Country of origin: United States
- No. of seasons: 21
- No. of episodes: 4,747

Production
- Executive producer: David Salzman
- Production locations: Cleveland, Ohio (1961–1965); Philadelphia, Pennsylvania (1965–1978); Los Angeles, California (1978–1981)
- Production companies: Group W Productions (1961–1980); Mike Douglas Entertainment and Syndicast Services (1980–1981)

Original release
- Network: KYW-TV (1961—1963), Syndicated (1963—1981)
- Release: December 11, 1961 – November 30, 1981

The Mike Douglas Show is an American daytime television talk show hosted by Mike Douglas. It began as a local program in Cleveland in 1961 before expanding into syndication. Production moved to Philadelphia in August 1965 and remained there until 1978, when the program moved to Los Angeles. The program continued until 1981.

== History in Cleveland ==
The Mike Douglas Show premiered on KYW-TV in Cleveland on December 11, 1961. Producer Woody Fraser recruited him to host the program; its format developed around conversation, musical performances and a different guest co-host each week. Douglas, who had worked professionally as a singer, typically opened the program by singing rather than delivering a comedic monologue. The Ellie Frankel Trio served as the show's house musicians during its Cleveland years.

The program expanded rapidly beyond its original Cleveland audience. The weekly co-host format became an important feature of the show, with performers such as Joe E. Brown and Jerry Lester among its early co-hosts. By 1963, the program was being carried by other stations owned by Westinghouse Broadcasting, including KDKA-TV in Pittsburgh, WBZ-TV in Boston, WJZ-TV in Baltimore and KPIX in San Francisco. By the following year, it was being carried in 27 cities.

Barbra Streisand appeared on the program and served as a guest co-host while still early in her career. Douglas later recalled her appearances and performances on the show. She served as co-host from February 11 to 15, 1963.

On November 22, 1963, Douglas was hosting a live broadcast when news of the assassination of John F. Kennedy reached the studio. Douglas was interviewing Federal Housing Administrator Robert C. Weaver when KYW-TV newscaster John Dancy interrupted the broadcast with the first reports.

On July 23, 1964, the program featured Sam Sheppard, his wife Ariane Tebbenjohanns and attorney F. Lee Bailey, shortly after Sheppard had been released from prison. Comedian Henry Morgan, another guest on the program, protested Sheppard's appearance.

Production moved to Philadelphia in August 1965.

== History in Philadelphia ==
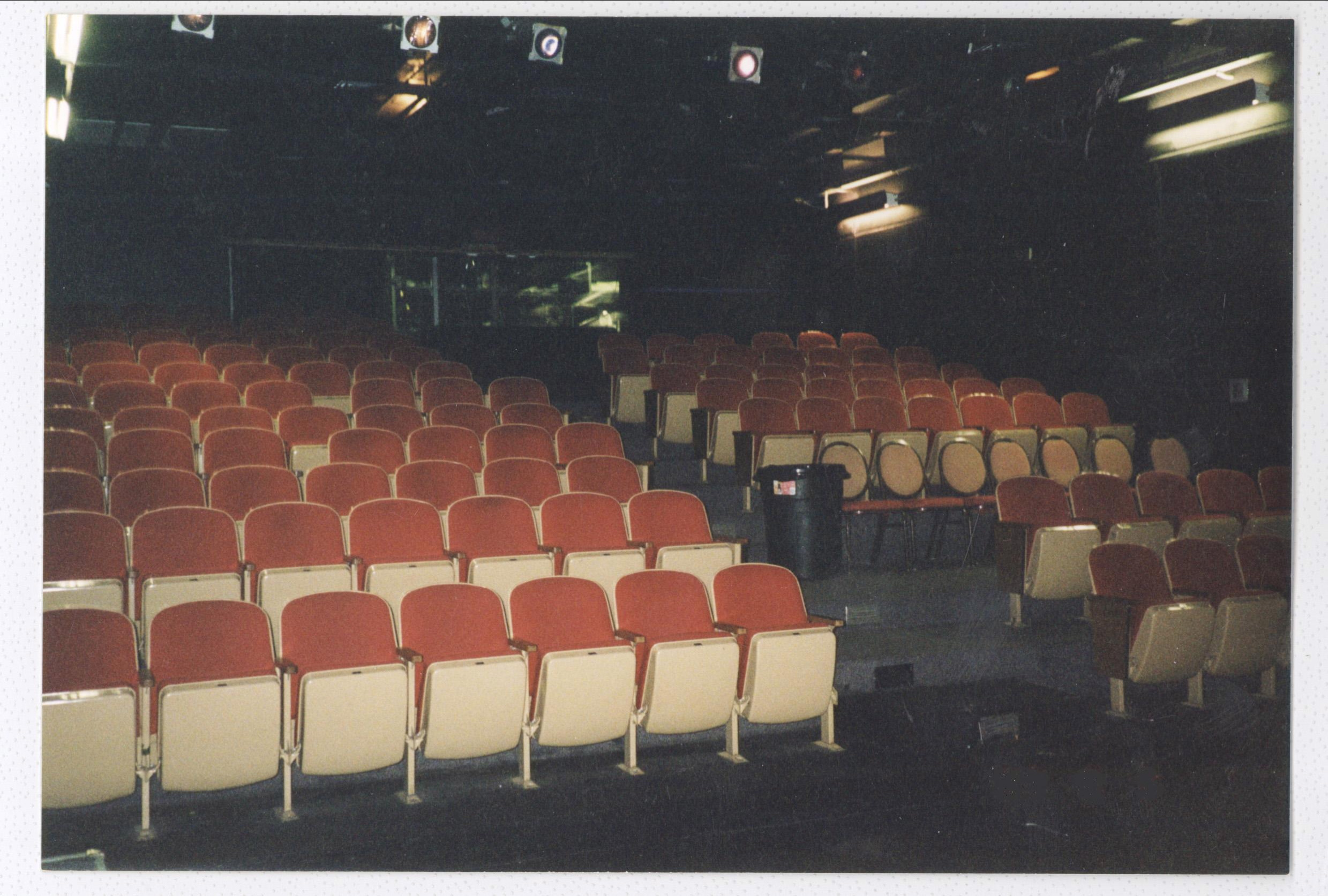
The Mike Douglas Show studio at KYW-TV, 1619 Walnut Street, Philadelphia

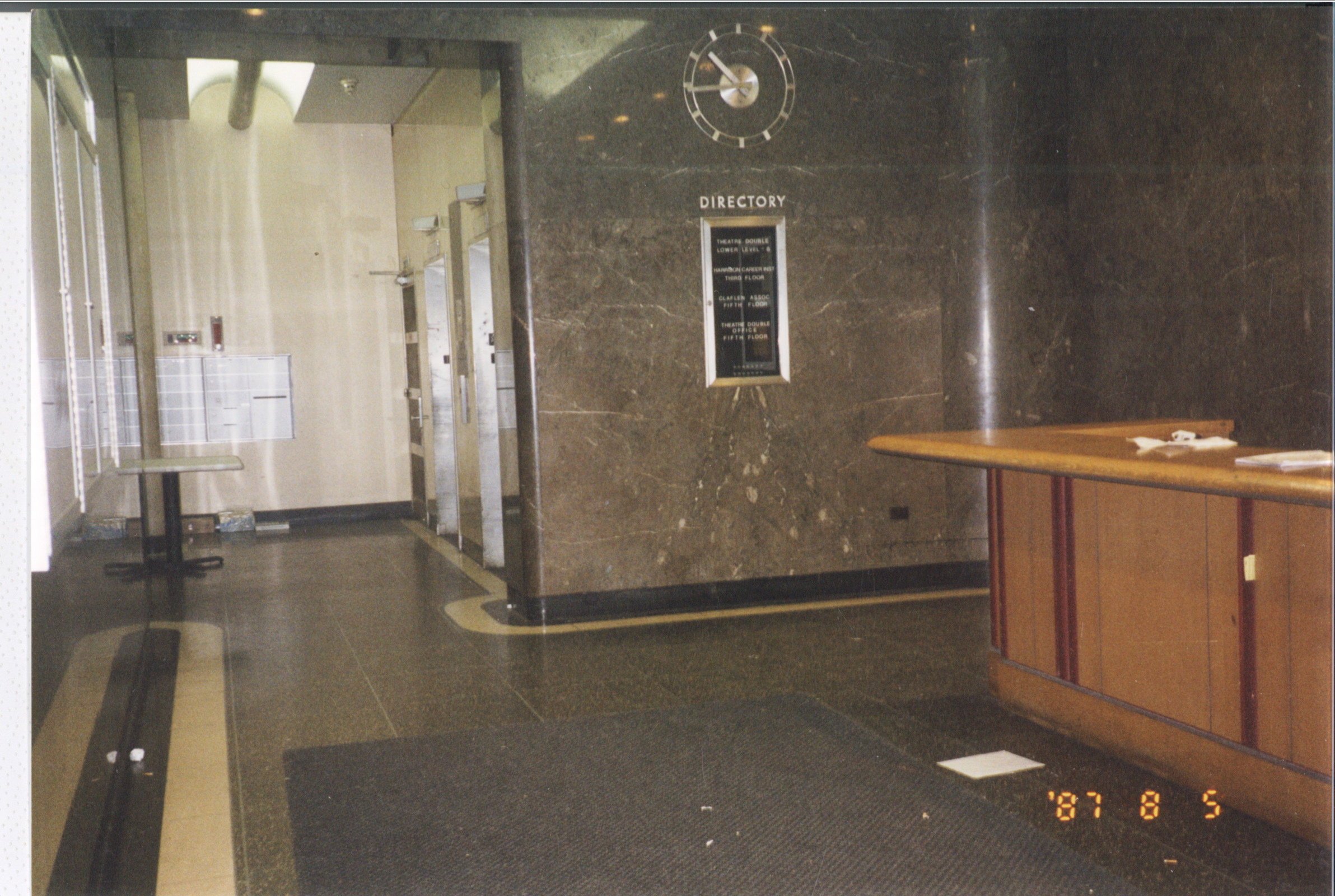
The Mike Douglas Show lobby at 1619 Walnut Street, Philadelphia

In August 1965, production of The Mike Douglas Show moved from Cleveland to Philadelphia, following the return of KYW-TV to Westinghouse Broadcasting.

The program was initially produced at KYW-TV's studios at 1619 Walnut Street. The studio seated approximately 140 people.

The show initially continued to air live. Douglas later recalled that after Zsa Zsa Gabor used profanity during a broadcast, the program switched from live broadcasts to taping in advance, allowing objectionable material to be removed before airing. Live broadcasts using a short delay were occasionally produced for special events.

Future political consultant and Fox News founder Roger Ailes worked on the program as a producer and later executive producer. Ailes worked with Richard Nixon on his television image when Nixon appeared on the program. In 1967, Ailes and Nixon discussed the use of television in politics, and Nixon subsequently hired Ailes as a television adviser for his 1968 presidential campaign.

In February 1972, John Lennon and Yoko Ono served as co-hosts for a week of programs. Their guests included Jerry Rubin, Bobby Seale, Ralph Nader, George Carlin and Chuck Berry, and the programs combined discussions of political and social issues with musical performances. The five episodes were the highest-rated week in the show's history, and are the subject of the documentary Daytime Revolution (2024).

In July 1972, production moved to KYW-TV's newly built facilities at Fifth and Market streets in Center City Philadelphia. The new Studio A was constructed specifically for the program. Production remained in Philadelphia until the show moved to Los Angeles in 1978.

Ellie Frankel continued as musical director until 1967, when she was succeeded by composer and bandleader Joe Harnell. Harnell remained with the program until 1973 and was subsequently succeeded by Frank Hunter and Joe Massimino.

During much of its Philadelphia period, The Mike Douglas Show was among the most popular syndicated daytime television programs. In 1976, Douglas made a surprise appearance on Match Game to congratulate host Gene Rayburn after the game show surpassed his program in the daytime ratings.

== Move to Los Angeles and cancelation (1978–1981) ==
In 1978, production of The Mike Douglas Show moved from Philadelphia to Los Angeles. The program was produced at CBS Television City in Hollywood.

One of the best-known episodes from the Los Angeles period featured two-year-old Tiger Woods, who made his national television debut on October 6, 1978, appearing with his father, Earl Woods. Woods demonstrated his golf swing and took part in a putting contest with fellow guest Bob Hope; Jimmy Stewart also appeared on the program.

In 1980, Westinghouse Broadcasting ended its association with Douglas and replaced his program with a new syndicated talk show hosted by John Davidson. The John Davidson Show replaced Douglas as the centerpiece of Group W's syndicated daytime talk-show lineup. Douglas continued The Mike Douglas Show with another distributor, while Davidson's program premiered on June 30, 1980.

Davidson's show lasted two seasons. In 1982, Group W announced that it would discontinue the program, citing a "dramatic change in marketing conditions"; its final delayed broadcast was scheduled for August 27, 1982.

Douglas continued The Mike Douglas Show with Syndicast Services taking over distribution in 1980.

By 1981, Douglas believed that the television talk-show market had become overcrowded and that the program's syndicated production schedule put it at a disadvantage to live and locally produced competitors. On October 12, the program was relaunched in 104 markets as The Mike Douglas Entertainment Hour, with a reduced emphasis on interviews and a greater focus on music, comedy and variety. The revised format did not reverse the show's declining ratings, and the program ended later that year, with the final episode airing November 30, 1981.

== Legacy ==
The Mike Douglas Show was an early success in the development of syndicated daytime talk television. Television historian Robert Thompson later described Douglas as one of the "early settlers" of daytime talk shows, noting the friendly, attentive interviewing style that distinguished his program.

The show's combination of conversation, music and a weekly guest co-host became one of its defining features. Douglas later said that he considered the program as much a music show as a talk show. Its guests ranged across entertainment, politics and popular culture, and several appearances later became notable in their own right, including the 1972 week co-hosted by John Lennon and Yoko Ono and the 1978 national television debut of Tiger Woods.

Douglas's style also influenced later daytime television hosts. When Rosie O'Donnell launched her syndicated talk show in 1996, she cited Douglas as a role model, and he subsequently appeared as a guest on her program.

== Awards ==
| Year | Award | Category | Recipient | Result |
|---|---|---|---|---|
| 1967 | Emmy Award | Program and Individual Achievements in Daytime Programming – Individuals | Mike Douglas | Won |
| 1977 | Emmy Award | Outstanding Individual Director for a Daytime Variety Program | Don Roy King (For episode "Mike in Hollywood with Ray Charles and Michel Legrand") | Won |
| 1978 | Emmy Award | Outstanding Individual Achievement in Daytime Programming | David M. Clark | Won |
| 1981 | Emmy Award | Individual Achievement in Any Area of Creative Technical Crafts – Costume Designer | Dayton Anderson (For episode on February 9, 1981) | Won |
