= The Kraft Summer Music Hall =

US television program

The Kraft Summer Music Hall is a 1966 television music comedy series broadcast in America. It was written by George Carlin, starring John Davidson as the host. The hour-long show was produced by Bob Banner. It was the summer replacement for The Andy Williams Show and Perry Como's Kraft Music Hall. The show aired from June 6 to August 29, 1966.

The Four King Cousins, known then as The Five King Cousins, and the Lively Set provided music in each episode. Two former members of the New Christy Minstrels, Jackie Miller and Gayle Caldwell, were regular singers on the show. Carlin and Richard Pryor were regular comedians on the series. Davidson described the show as "sort of a 'Talent Scouts' for the university set".

In the last segment of each episode, Davidson entered the audience to speak to audience members and then to sing a song from the years when they were dating each other. One newspaper reviewer described the gambit as "a most embarrassing and tattered sequence" that detracted from an otherwise enjoyable show.

The final episode included guest stars Chad & Jeremy and Flip Wilson (who had also appeared in an earlier episode).
