= Wolf Rock TV =

- The logo from the series' opening sequence
- Genre: Animated series
- Developed by: Len Janson; Chuck Menville
- Written by: Mike O'Mahoney; Chuck Lorre; Jay Johnson; Len Udes; Warren Taylor; Dennis Mark
- Directed by: Bernard Deyries (supervision director); Ginny McSwain (voice director)
- Voices of: Wolfman Jack; Frank Welker; Jason Bernard; Robert Vega; Siu Ming Carson; Noelle North
- Composers: Shuki Levy; Haim Saban; Marty Wereshi
- Country of origin: United States
- Original language: English
- No. of seasons: 1
- No. of episodes: 7

Production
- Executive producers: Jean Chalopin; Dick Clark; Andy Heyward
- Producers: Jean Chalopin; Dick Clark; Andy Heyward; Toshitsugu Mukaitsubo; Kiyoshi Ieno
- Editor: Shuichi Kakesu
- Running time: 30 minutes
- Production companies: Dick Clark Productions; DIC Enterprises

Original release
- Network: ABC
- Release: September 8 – October 20, 1984

Wolf Rock TV is a 1984 American live action/animated series produced by DIC Enterprises and Dick Clark Productions, featuring the voice of Wolfman Jack. The series ran for seven episodes on ABC before it was canceled due to low ratings. Wolf Rock TV was replaced by Scary Scooby Funnies, which consisted of reruns of Scooby-Doo and Scrappy-Doo shorts from The Richie Rich/Scooby-Doo Show (1980–1982).

The series re-aired in syndication in 1989 with the animated series Kidd Video in a segment known as "The Wolf Rock Power Hour". As of today, copies of the series remain unavailable to the public, though some animation cels and merchandise relating to the show have surfaced.

== Synopsis ==
Wolfman hosts a rock music TV program with three teenagers, Sarah, Sunny and Ricardo, while playing some real live action music videos. A parrot named Bopper also appeared as their comic relief pet. They had a manager, Mr. Morris, who shows dislike towards the kind of music Jack showcases.

A segment was Wolf Rock News and another was The Rock N' Roll Museum with live-action interviews.

== Cast ==
- Wolfman Jack as himself
- Frank Welker as Bopper
- Jason Bernard as Mr. Morris
- Robert Vega as Ricardo
- Siu Ming Carson as Sarah
- Noelle North as Sunny

=== Additional voices ===
- William Callaway
- Pat Fraley
- Linda Gary
- Barbara Goodson as Mayor's Wife
- Maurice LaMarche
- Tress MacNeille
- Danny Mann
- Fred Travalena

== Crew ==
- Ginny McSwain - voice director

== Episodes ==
No.	Title	Original release date
1	"The Video Nappers"	September 8, 1984
2	"Bad News Birds"	September 15, 1984
3	"Bopper Goes Ape"	September 22, 1984
4	"The Nerds Who Fell to Earth"	September 29, 1984
5	"No Time for Sarge"	October 6, 1984
6	"Rockin' Robot"	October 13, 1984
7	"Wolfman's Granny"	October 20, 1984
