= Your Number's Up =

- Genre: Game show
- Created by: Sande Stewart
- Directed by: Bruce Burmester
- Presented by: Nipsey Russell with Lee Menning
- Announcer: Gene Wood; John Harlan
- Theme music composer: Bob Cobert
- Country of origin: United States
- No. of episodes: 65

Production
- Producer: Sande Stewart
- Running time: approx. 26 minutes
- Production company: Sande Stewart Productions

Original release
- Network: NBC
- Release: September 23 – December 20, 1985

Your Number's Up is a game show that aired on NBC from September 23 to December 20, 1985. The show was hosted by Nipsey Russell with Lee Menning as co-host. Announcing duties were handled by Gene Wood for the first month and John Harlan for the rest of the run, with Johnny Haymer and Johnny Gilbert as substitutes.

This show was the first series produced by Sande Stewart, son of game show producer Bob Stewart. Your Number's Up was put up against the elder Stewart's The $25,000 Pyramid on CBS at 10:00 AM Eastern. Most of the staff from Bob Stewart Productions also worked in the production of this series.

== Rules ==
Three on-stage contestants, two new challengers and one returning champion, were each given one point at the outset of the game, indicated by diamonds on the front of their podiums. Encircling the contestants' podiums was an electronic wheel with digits 0–9, blank spaces, and a car symbol. The digits and symbols were spaced so that the wheel would stop with either a blank at one contestant's position and a digit at the other two, or a car at one position and blanks at the others.

The contestant in control spun the wheel by pulling a lever. If it stopped on two digits and a blank, the contestant with the blank was read the first halves of two riddle-type phrases, each with an acronym to be filled in. An example of these would be as follows:

"When T.O. speaks..."
"As predicted, the I.O.M...."

After the contestant selected one of the two phrases, the host read its second half to the other two contestants. (Example: after selecting the first phrase above, the host read "...all of the House listens." Answer: Tip O'Neill, who was serving as Speaker of the United States House of Representatives at the time.) The first contestant to buzz-in and fill in the acronym correctly scored one point and spun the wheel for the next turn; incorrect guesses deducted one point, but scores could never go below zero. If neither opponent guessed correctly, the contestant who selected the riddle won $50 and spun the wheel, but did not score any points. The first contestant to score six points won the game and $500.

If the car symbol appeared under a contestant's pointer, that contestant attempted to guess which digit was hidden under a question mark on a car's license plate. The first three weeks of the series used a new plate for each attempt. Later, a single plate was used, with previous incorrect digits automatically eliminated from each subsequent attempt. Guessing correctly won the contestant the car regardless of the game's outcome.

=== Audience game ===
A correct answer by a contestant added their digit to a board hanging above the stage. At any point during the game, if the last four digits of any studio audience member's phone number appeared on the board (in any order, not necessarily in sequence), they came up on stage to predict which contestant would win the game. A maximum of three audience members could participate in this manner during any one game, with each choosing a different contestant. An audience member who correctly predicted the winner received a trip.

If a digit was duplicated in an audience member's phone number, they had to wait until all instances of that digit were placed on the board. For example, an audience member with "1234" needed one of each digit to come on stage, while one with "5555" needed four 5's to be eligible. The board was cleared at the start of each new game.

== Bonus round ==
The winner drew a postcard sent in by a home viewer, who immediately won $1,000. Prior to the first episode, postcards were obtained via an ad in TV Guide; during the show's run, viewers with telephone numbers whose last four digits appeared on the main game board were eligible to send in cards. The contestant then had 60 seconds to reveal the last four digits of the chosen viewer's phone number. They selected a digit 0–9 from a board which resembled a touch-tone phone keypad, with an acronym displayed below each digit, and a clue was read. (Example: T.P.E. delivered the mail by horse – answer: The Pony Express.) If the contestant answered correctly, all instances of the chosen digit in the home viewer's phone number (if any) were revealed and the digit was removed from the board. If the contestant answered incorrectly or passed, a new acronym was put below that digit.

The contestant won $100 for each correct answer, or $5,000 for revealing the entire number. If the contestant won the bonus game on any day from Monday through Thursday, the home viewer received an additional $1,000; a Friday win awarded $5,000 more. After the series was canceled, 15 home viewers won $1,000 each in a random drawing from the unused postcards.
