= Scooby's Mystery Funhouse =

- Directed by: Oscar Dufau; Bob Goe; George Gordon; Bill Hutton; Tony Love; Don Lusk; Ray Patterson; Ann Tucker; Carl Urbano; John Walker; Rudy Zamora
- Voices of: Don Messick; Casey Kasem; Heather North
- Theme music composer: Hoyt Curtin
- Opening theme: Hoyt Curtin
- Country of origin: United States
- Original language: English
- No. of seasons: 1
- No. of episodes: 21 (3 shorts per half-hour episode)

Production
- Executive producers: William Hanna; Joseph Barbera
- Producer: Art Scott
- Running time: 30 minutes
- Production company: Hanna-Barbera Productions

Original release
- Network: ABC
- Release: September 7, 1985 – January 25, 1986

Related
- Scary Scooby Funnies

Scooby's Mystery Funhouse was a 30-minute Saturday morning animated package show produced by Hanna-Barbera Productions and broadcast on ABC from September 7, 1985 to January 25, 1986.

== Overview ==
The series consisted of repackaged reruns of Scooby-Doo and Scrappy-Doo shorts from the following shows:

- The Richie Rich/Scooby-Doo Show (1980–81)
- The Scooby & Scrappy-Doo/Puppy Hour (1982)
- The New Scooby and Scrappy-Doo Show / The New Scooby-Doo Mysteries (1983–84)

A total of 63 shorts were rebroadcast in 21 half-hour formats (three segments aired per show).

== Episodes ==
1. "From Bad to Curse" / "Scoobygeist" / "Hound of the Scoobyvilles" (September 7, 1985)
2. "Close Encounter of the Worst Kind" / "Scooby the Barbarian" / "Where's the Werewolf" (September 14, 1985)
3. "Captain Canine Caper" / "Scooby of the Jungle" / "Who's Minding the Monster?" (September 21, 1985)
4. "Scoobsie" / "Scooby-Doo and Genie-Poo" / "The Incredible Cat Lady Caper" (September 28, 1985)
5. "Basketball Bumblers" / "No Thanks, Masked Manx" / "Wizards and Warlocks" (October 5, 1985)
6. "Scooby ala Mode" / "Super Teen Shaggy" / "Maltese Mackerel" (October 12, 1985)
7. "Hoedown Showdown" / "Mission Un-DOO-Able" / "Scooby's Gold Medal Gambit" (October 19, 1985)
8. "The Hand of Horror" / "Scoo-Be or Not Scoo-Be" / "Who's Scooby-Doo?" (October 26, 1985)
9. "Double Trouble Date" / "Scooby's Peep-Hole Pandemonium" / "Comic Book Caper" (November 2, 1985)
10. "A Gem of a Case" / "South Pole Vault" / "The 'Dooby Dooby Doo' Ado" (November 9, 1985)
11. "Beauty Contest Caper" / "The Fall Dog" / "The Scooby Coupe" (November 16, 1985)
12. "Scooby and the Minotaur" / "Scooby Pinch Hits" / "Scooby Roo" (November 23, 1985)
13. "Hothouse Scooby" / "Punk Rock Scooby" / "Scooby 2000" (November 30, 1985)
14. "Canine to Five" / "Hard Hat Scooby" / "Sopwith Scooby" (December 7, 1985)
15. "Robot Ranch" / "Scooby Dooby Guru" / "Surprised Spies" (December 14, 1985)
16. "Pigskin Scooby" / "Scooby and the Beanstalk" / "Tenderbigfoot" (December 21, 1985)
17. "A Fright at the Opera" / "Invasion of the Scooby Snatchers" / "Scooby and the Bandit" (December 28, 1985)
18. "Dog Tag Scooby" / "Scooby at the Center of the World" / "Scooby's Trip to Ahz" (January 4, 1986)
19. "The Dinosaur Deception" / "Scooby of the Jungle" / "The Quagmire Quake Caper" (January 11, 1986)
20. "No Thanks, Masked Manx" / "The Crazy Carnival Caper" / "The Mark of Scooby" (January 18, 1986)
21. "No Sharking Zone" / "Scooby-Doo and Cyclops, Too" / "The Creature Came from Chem Lab" (January 25, 1986)

== Voices ==
- Don Messick – Scooby-Doo, Scrappy-Doo
- Casey Kasem – Norville "Shaggy" Rogers
- Heather North – Daphne Blake

== See also ==
- List of Scooby-Doo media
