= Time Machine (game show) =

1985 American game show

- Created by: Bill Barr
- Directed by: James Marcione
- Presented by: John Davidson
- Announcer: Charlie Tuna
- Theme music composer: Marc Ellis; Ray Ellis
- Country of origin: United States
- No. of episodes: 79

Production
- Executive producer: Robert Noah
- Producer: Caryn Lucas
- Production locations: NBC Studios; Burbank, California
- Running time: 30 minutes
- Production company: Reg Grundy Productions

Original release
- Network: NBC
- Release: January 7 – April 26, 1985

Time Machine is an American game show where contestants compete to answer trivia questions about popular culture and recent history to win prizes. The show aired on NBC from January 7 through April 26, 1985, and was hosted by John Davidson. Charlie Tuna was the announcer, with Rich Jeffries as his substitute. Reg Grundy Productions produced the series, and upon its premiere Time Machine was one of three Grundy series airing on NBC (Sale of the Century, which followed Time Machine on NBC's daytime schedule, and Scrabble were the other two).

Most of the questions used focused on nostalgia, popular culture, and recent history, and more specifically what year a particular event occurred.

== Format #1 ==
Three contestants, one usually a returning champion, competed in mini-games, similar to pricing games from The Price Is Right, to win prizes. The prizes won went into a contestant's "Prize Bank". Each contestant played one game, with the champion playing the third game.

=== Mini Games (Format #1) ===
- "Tube Game" – The contestant was given the names of two shows, and had to pick which one was airing in a given year. A correct answer gave the player control of the network the show was airing on. This process was done three times–the first with ABC shows, the second with NBC shows, and the third with CBS shows. After all three networks had been played the location of a hidden prize package was revealed, and if the contestant controlled that network the package was added to their prize bank. If the contestant got all 3 correct, he/she won the prize automatically.
- "3 In A Row" – In each square of a tic-tac-toe board is a different year, all from the same decade. 3 In A Row had two different formats. The first format had a player start by picking three cards dubbed "Poison Cards". After the Poison Cards were chosen the player was shown nine events and chose them one at a time. After a player chose an event the year it occurred lit up on the board, and the game continued until the player made any line. If a player made a line horizontally or vertically, a prize was added to their prize bank. A diagonal line won a larger prize, but if a player made a line with all three Poison Cards the game was lost. The second format gave the player a choice between two events; each time an event was chosen the year it happened was lit up on the board and a new event replaced it. Since the Poison Cards were no longer in play, a player could only lose by making a diagonal line.
- "As Time Goes By" – To begin, the contestant was given one free spin. Three photos of a celebrity were shown to the contestant one at a time and they had to guess in what year the photo was taken. Each time the player came within five years of the correct year they earned a spin. They then took their spins to the Money Clock, a spinner made to look like a clock. The area around 12 o'clock was painted red. The pointer moved automatically, and the contestant watched it for a few seconds. They then turned away and hit a plunger, stopping the pointer. If they landed at the red area, a prize was added to their prize bank. The game continued until a player stopped the pointer in the red area to win the prize or until they ran out of spins and lost.
- "Before Or After" – The contestant was given $200 and a base year, and the contestant had to guess whether an event happened before or after the base year. A correct guess doubled the money, and the year of that event became the new base year. The contestant had three opportunities to double their money, for a maximum of $1,600 for three correct answers. After the third question, the contestant was given an opportunity to bank the money and stop or risk it on a double-or-nothing final question. Answering correctly doubled the money and added it to the prize bank, but answering incorrectly lost it all.
- "Sweet Sixteen" – Similar to the "Lucky Seven" pricing game on The Price Is Right. The contestant was given sixteen $100 bills to start the game. They were then shown a series of four products and had to guess what year they were introduced. For the first three products, the contestant was given a range to guess in (sometime in the 1950s, within the last 10 years, etc.). If any $100 bills were left after the fourth product, the leftover money and an additional prize package was put in their Prize Bank.
- "Main Event" – A base year was given along with five categories. The contestant was given a free category of their choice to start and then picked from the remaining categories one at a time. Each category had one question with two possible answers, with a right answer winning the category and a clue for the "Main Event", which was something that occurred in the base year. After all the categories were played a clue was revealed and the contestant got an opportunity to guess. Guessing the Main Event on the first clue put $5,000 in the Prize Bank; each subsequent clue cut the value by $1,000.

=== Time Capsule ===
After the mini-games were played the three contestants faced off in the final round, the Time Capsule. Davidson gave the players a list of four events that all happened in the same year, and then a clip from a popular song from that year was played. The contestants then attempted to guess the year, and the contestant with the closest guess became the champion, won all of their banked prizes, and advanced to the bonus round. The other two players left with parting gifts. If two or more contestants were equally close, John would read a question related to the Time Capsule year to the tied players; the first one to buzz in with the right answer won.

== Format #2 ==
On February 11 (just over a month after the series began), the format was completely overhauled with many mini-games undergoing rule changes to fit the new format and others retired. The champion no longer played the mini games, with the two challengers playing for the right to meet him/her in the final round.

Three mini-games were played. The first two mini-games were worth one point, the last one was worth two, and both challengers got to keep whatever they managed to win in the mini-games. The one with the most points after three games won the game and advanced to the Challenge Round. If there was a tie after three games, a tiebreaker question was read; the first one to buzz in with the right answer won the game.

=== Mini Games (Format #2) ===
Six mini-games were used in this new format. Unlike the old format, the same two lineups were used for every episode, alternating each day.

==== Lineup #1 ====
- "Game 1: As Time Goes By": The format was the same as described above, but instead of trying to guess the year that each picture was taken, a higher/lower format was used. One player gave a guess of which year each photo was taken, and the other had to decide if the actual year was earlier or later. The actual year was then revealed, and if the second player guessed correctly he/she earned a spin on the Money Clock. Otherwise the first player received the spin. The Money Clock now displayed monetary values of $100, $300, and $1,000 (the smallest space among the three) as well as one that awarded nothing. As before, the contestants watched the pointer spin before turning away and hitting the plunger to stop it. Both contestants kept any money won during the round, with the one that made the most money winning the game and a point.
- "Game 2: Tube Game": The Tube Game was revised for the new format. Now, Davidson asked questions about television series airing on the three major networks in a certain year. The object was to be the first to reach five points, with the winner receiving a prize.
- "Game 3: Jukebox Game": Debuting after the change in format, the Jukebox Game was a music-centric quiz. Four jukeboxes were shown, each emblazoned with a different year from a certain decade. A song is played, and two possible artists are given. Buzzing in with the right artist won the right to match the song with the year it was released. If they got a match, they got a point. If they missed, their opponent got one chance to pick the right one and steal the point. The jukebox with the right answer was eliminated from play regardless. If all the jukeboxes were eliminated, then the contestants just had to identify the song's artist to get the point, without having to match the song to a year. First to three points won the game and a prize.

==== Lineup #2 ====
- "Game 1: On The Button" – An event was given, and one player guessed what year the event happened in. Getting it exactly right won a point for that player. If they guessed wrong, Davidson would say whether the event happened before or after that year, and the other contestant had a chance to guess. This continued until one player got three points, winning the game and a prize. This game used the same set as "Sweet Sixteen".
- "Game 2: 3 In A Row" – Just like before, each square of a tic-tac-toe board had a different year from the same decade. Three spaces in a row were marked with stars; these made up the "Magic 3 In A Row". One player was given two events. The contestant picked an event from the two choices, and the year it happened in lit up. A new event takes the selected one's place, and the other contestant picked one. Picking a space in the Magic 3 In A Row won $100, which the contestant kept win or lose. The contestant who lit up the third space in the Magic 3 In A Row won the game and a prize.
- "Game 3: Main Event" – As before, a base year was given along with five categories. The game begins with a pot of $200. The contestants alternate picking categories, each one having one question with two possible answers. Each correct answer adds $200 to the pot. After all the categories were played, clues to a “Main Event” were revealed one at a time. The first person to buzz in and correctly guess the Main Event won the game and the pot.

=== Challenge Round ===
The Challenge Round was played in the same way as the Time Capsule round from the previous format, except with two players and a different name.

The winner from the first half of the show and the returning champion competed to see which one of them would be advancing to the bonus round. As before, the closest one to the actual year, high or low, won the championship.

== Bonus Round ==
Three different bonus games were used during the show's run.

- Bonus Round #1 – Four events were given, only one of which happened in a given year. If the contestant picked the right event, he or she won a growing Jackpot of prizes. The champion only played for the prizes if he or she guessed the exact year in the Time Capsule round.
- Bonus Round #2 – A target year was given, and up to four questions were asked. The contestant's job was to guess whether the event occurred before or after the given year. Four correct answers won the bonus round, a prize package that included a new car, and a cash jackpot that began at $1,000 and increased $1,000 every day until hit. The game ended if the player missed a question, but each time he/she made it back to the bonus round one less correct answer was required to win.
- Bonus Round #3 – This bonus round was used when the second format began and was played exactly the same way as the second bonus, but instead of playing for the prize package and cash the champion played for the car. The champion had to provide four answers to win the car on the first try, with one less required for each return trip, and the car was automatically won if the player made it to a fifth day. Under this format, a champion retired when they won the car; the contestant they defeated in that day's Challenge Round then became the new champion.
