= Turbo Teen =

Television series

- Genre: Adventure
- Created by: Ruby-Spears Productions
- Developed by: Michael Maurer
- Voices of: T. K. Carter; Pat Fraley; Pamela Hayden; Michael Mish; Frank Welker
- Composer: Udi Harpaz
- Country of origin: United States
- Original language: English
- No. of seasons: 1
- No. of episodes: 13

Production
- Executive producers: Joe Ruby; Ken Spears
- Running time: 20 mins (excluding commercials)
- Production company: Ruby-Spears Productions

Original release
- Network: ABC
- Release: September 8 – December 1, 1984

Turbo Teen is an American animated television series about a teenager with the ability to transform into a sports car. It aired on Saturday morning on the ABC Network for thirteen episodes in 1984.

The series was rerun on the USA Network's USA Cartoon Express programming block.

== Plot ==
Turbo Teen is about a teenager named Brett Matthews who swerves off a road during a thunderstorm and crashes into a secret government laboratory. There, he and his red sports car are accidentally exposed to a molecular beam, invented by a mad scientist named Dr. Chase for a government agent named Cauldwell. As a result, Brett and his car become fused together. Brett gains the ability to morph into the car when exposed to extreme heat and revert into his human form when exposed to extreme cold. With this new superhero power, Brett, along with his girlfriend Pattie (a freelance reporter), his best friend Alex (a mechanic who calls Brett "TT"), and his dog Rusty go on crime-fighting adventures together and solve other mysteries.

A recurring subplot involves Brett, Cauldwell, and Dr. Chase's search for a way to return Brett to normal. Also, a recurring villain is the mysterious, unseen "Dark Rider" who drives a monster truck and seeks to capture Brett in order to find the secret behind his abilities. In addition, Brett and his friends deal with the shenanigans of their classmates Eddie and Flip.

== Episodes ==
No.	Title	Story by	Original release date
1	"Turbo Thieves"	Mark Jones	September 8, 1984
Brett is kidnapped by goons who believe Turbo Teen will make them rich.
2	"The Dark Rider"	Michael Maurer	September 15, 1984
Brett and Turbo Teen are featured in an exhibition while a mysterious man known as Dark Rider pursues him.
3	"Mystery of Fantasy Park"	Matt Uitz	September 22, 1984
Brett and his friends are asked by Agent Cauldwell to investigate a local amusement park.
4	"No Show UFO"	Evelyn A.R. Gabai	September 29, 1984
Brett and his friends are tasked, again by Cauldwell, to investigate UFO sightings in the area.
5	"Micro-Teen"	Dennis Marks	October 6, 1984
Although Dr. Chase's team cannot 'fix' Brett's condition, apparently they have created a ray that shrinks the crew for an infiltration mission into a mansion where something of value is hidden behind various defenses and its owners.
6	"The Sinister Souped-Up Seven"	Matt Uitz	October 13, 1984
Turbo and his friends evade the Dark Rider in the American southwest. After dropping them off, he crashes into a cave wall, getting amnesia, to be woken up by reservation natives. His friends find them and try to help him regain his memory, while thwarting the plans of villains who want to destroy a mission on the reservation.
7	"Video Venger"	Michael Brown	October 20, 1984
Various war machines from an arcade game come to life when Brett and his friends discover the game is a training program for a real planned invasion of Washington D.C.
8	"Dark Rider and the Wolves of Doom"	Michael Maurer	October 27, 1984
Dark Rider captures Monique's father Dr. Fabro and his formula that can cause dogs to regress to their primitive state in his latest plan to capture Brett Matthews.
9	"The Curse of the Twisted Claw"	Matt Uitz, Michael Maurer	November 3, 1984
Twin items of rare historical antiquity near Bombay, and it is up to Brett and his friends to recover it before those who may use them unjustly can do the same.
10	"Daredevil Run"	Cliff Ruby, Elana Lesser	November 10, 1984
Brett, Alex, and Pattie enter a cross-country race as cover while escorting a girl named Paula to court so that she can testify against a jewel thief called "The Dragon."
11	"The Amazon Adventure"	Ted Pedersen	November 17, 1984
Brett and friends are visiting Brazil with Brett's father when they become entangled with a local ruffian.
12	"Fright Friday"	Matt Uitz	November 24, 1984
While camping, a story about a local legend of masked men in the woods comes true and Brett and the others must save their friends.
13	"The Mystery of Dark Rider"	Michael Maurer	December 1, 1984
After a Turbo Teen clone robs a local bank, Brett must clear his name while working to uncover the identity of Dark Rider once and for all.

== Cast ==
- T. K. Carter as Alex
- Pat Fraley as Dr. Chase, Eddie
- Pamela Hayden as Pattie
- Michael Mish as Brett Matthews/Turbo Teen
- Clive Revill as Cardwell
- Frank Welker as Rusty, Dark Rider, Flip

=== Additional voices ===
- Nelson Comer
- Alan Dinehart
- Ron Feinberg
- Alejandro Garay
- Linda Gary
- Bob Holt
- William Martin
- Michael Sheehan

== Crew ==
- Alan Dinehart – Voice Director
- Howard Morris – Voice Director
- Michael Maurer – Story Editor
- John Kimball – Director
- Jack Kirby – Production Design

== Production ==
The show was produced by Ruby-Spears Productions with animation supplied by Toei Animation and Hanho Heung-Up. It was broadcast during the growing popularity of the Knight Rider television series and mirrors much of it. The car that Brett turns into looks like an amalgam of a Third Generation Chevrolet Camaro and its sister car, the Pontiac Trans Am; the later model Knight Rider's KITT is based on. The Trans Am also had limited edition turbocharger packages in the early 1980s, appearing as an official Indy 500 pace car and featuring in the movie Smokey and the Bandit II.

== Broadcast ==
The series was broadcast on ABC from September 8, 1984 through August 30, 1985. The series was rebroadcast on the USA Network as part of USA Cartoon Express May 5, 1989 to March 4, 1992. Following its USA run, Cartoon Network briefly aired Turbo Teen as part of their Look What We Found! programming block airing the series from October 16 through October 17, 1994.

== Reception ==
In The Encyclopedia of American Animated Television Shows, David Perlmutter writes "This is perhaps the most absurd concept developed for television animation in the genre's history. Despite a basis in somewhat-plausible science, it was not produced competently enough to make its premise anywhere near believable."
