= All-Star Blitz =

American television game show

- Genre: Game show
- Created by: Merrill Heatter
- Directed by: Jerome Shaw
- Presented by: Peter Marshall
- Announcer: John Harlan
- Country of origin: United States
- No. of episodes: 185

Production
- Producer: David M. Greenfield
- Production locations: The Prospect Studios; Hollywood, California
- Running time: 25 mins.
- Production companies: Merrill Heatter Productions; Peter Marshall Enterprises

Original release
- Network: ABC
- Release: April 8 – December 20, 1985

Related
- Hollywood Squares; PDQ and (All-Star) Baffle; The Last Word

All-Star Blitz is an American game show that aired on ABC from April 8 to December 20, 1985, with reruns airing on the USA Network from March 31 to December 26, 1986 (which became the only ABC game show to be rerun on the USA Network and the first Merrill Heatter game show to be rerun on cable television). Peter Marshall was the host and John Harlan was the announcer for the series, which was produced by Merrill Heatter Productions, in association with Peter Marshall Enterprises.

Like Heatter's productions Hollywood Squares and Battlestars before it, All-Star Blitz was a celebrity panel show where contestants had to correctly determine whether the celebrities were giving a correct answer or bluffing. Like Hollywood Squares, a secondary gameplay element was attached; in this particular instance, the element involved the contestants trying to solve puzzles.

== Main game ==
Two contestants, one usually a returning champion, competed to uncover and solve hidden word puzzles with the help of a four-celebrity panel. The puzzles, which varied in length from two to six words, were concealed behind a grid of six monitors above the panel, and a star was positioned at the corner of each monitor. There were 12 stars in all, arranged in four columns of three with one column above each celebrity's seat. Each monitor contained all or part of only one word, and the last word on the top row did not continue onto the bottom one.

The object for the contestants was to light the stars around the monitors. To begin play, the home audience was shown how many words were in the puzzle and a certain number of stars (originally two, later four) were lit at random. The contestant in control, usually the challenger, chose a celebrity and a position (top, middle, bottom). The star in that position was lit, and Marshall then asked a question to the chosen celebrity. The contestant either had to correctly agree or disagree with the given answer, in much the same manner as Hollywood Squares and Battlestars. Choosing correctly allowed the contestant to keep control and pick again, but making a wrong decision passed control to the opposing player.

Once all four stars around a monitor were lit, the part of the puzzle it was concealing required a correct agree/disagree choice from one of the contestants to reveal and the celebrity underneath the star would remain in play until one was given. Once the puzzle piece was uncovered, the contestant that revealed it was given a chance to guess the puzzle or continue playing as an incorrect guess passed control to his/her opponent.

Play continued on a puzzle until one player solved it or all six monitors were uncovered, with the player who uncovered the last monitor winning the game by default.

The first contestant to solve two puzzles won the match and a prize package, and went on to play the Blitz Bonanza. Rather than featuring models, celebrity guests often modeled and demonstrated prizes while being described by the announcer, which would be preceded by a message on the game board monitors describing the prize(s).

Each episode of All-Star Blitz was played to a time limit. If time was called during a puzzle, the contestant in control was given the option of whether or not to guess the puzzle. Choosing not to guess ended the game, and the solution to the puzzle was revealed. Guessing incorrectly gave the option to the opponent. Regardless of the decision and its outcome, play resumed on the next episode with either a new puzzle or the Blitz Bonanza as dictated by the rules.

== Blitz Bonanza ==
In the Blitz Bonanza round, the champion was given one final puzzle to solve. Initially, the champion was told how many words the puzzle contained, but this would change in favor of revealing the information to the home audience and panel only. In order to reveal the puzzle pieces, the champion spun a large wheel that controlled a randomizer light on the board. Every time the light landed on a covered space, a piece of the puzzle was revealed. However, it was possible for the spin to be "wasted", meaning that the light could land on a space that was already uncovered.

The champion spun the wheel four times. If fewer than four spaces were uncovered after the last spin, the champion was given the option to leave the board as it was or give up the prize package he/she had won in the main game in exchange for one more spin. After taking or declining this fifth spin, the champion was given 10 seconds to study the puzzle and each celebrity secretly wrote down a guess. The champion won a cash jackpot for solving the puzzle, or $250 per celebrity who had the correct answer in case of a miss.

The jackpot had a starting value of $10,000. Initially, it increased by $5,000 for each time the Blitz Bonanza was not won and was capped at a maximum value of $25,000. Later, the cap was reduced to $20,000 and the increase for every unsuccessful attempt was reduced to $2,500.

Champions remained on the show until they were defeated in the main game or had played the Blitz Bonanza four times.

== Broadcast history ==
All-Star Blitz originally aired on ABC at 11:00 AM EST, replacing Trivia Trap and followed by the long-running Family Feud. However, the series found itself facing competition from the first half of The Price Is Right on CBS and Wheel of Fortune on NBC.

In June 1985, two months after All-Star Blitz premiered, Family Feud was cancelled, and All-Star Blitz moved up a half-hour to the 11:30 AM EST slot formerly occupied by Feud. However, now competing against the second half of Price, as well as Scrabble on NBC, ratings did not improve and All-Star Blitz ended its run on December 20, 1985, being replaced by a new version of Love, American Style the following Monday.
