= Scary Scooby Funnies =

- Title card from Scary Scooby Funnies
- Directed by: Ray Patterson
- Voices of: Don Messick; Casey Kasem
- Theme music composer: Hoyt Curtin
- Country of origin: United States
- Original language: English
- No. of series: 1
- No. of episodes: 20 (3 shorts per half-hour episode)

Production
- Executive producers: Joseph Barbera; William Hanna
- Producer: Don Jurwich
- Running time: 30 minutes
- Production company: Hanna-Barbera Productions

Original release
- Network: ABC
- Release: October 20, 1984 – August 31, 1985

Related
- The Scooby & Scrappy-Doo/Puppy Hour; Scooby's Mystery Funhouse

Scary Scooby Funnies is a 30-minute Saturday morning animated package show produced by Hanna-Barbera Productions and broadcast on ABC from October 20, 1984 to August 31, 1985.

== Overview ==
The series consisted of repackaged reruns of Scooby-Doo and Scrappy-Doo shorts from The Richie Rich/Scooby-Doo Show (1980–1982). It was added to ABC's Saturday morning line-up following the cancellation of the short-lived animated series Wolf Rock TV.

A total of sixty 7-minute episodes were rebroadcast in 20 half-hour formats (three segments aired per show).

== Voices ==
- Don Messick – Scooby-Doo, Scrappy-Doo
- Casey Kasem – Norville "Shaggy" Rogers

== See also ==
- List of Scooby-Doo media
