= ABC Funfit =

- Genre: Children's program
- Written by: Donna Bond
- Directed by: Bill Fertik
- Starring: Mary Lou Retton
- Composer: Michael Zager
- Country of origin: United States
- Original language: English

Production
- Producer: Eleanor Sanger Riger
- Running time: 5 minutes

Original release
- Network: ABC
- Release: September 7 – December 7, 1985

ABC Funfit is a series of short American television segments that were broadcast in 1985 and aired twice a day during ABC's Saturday morning cartoon programs. The segments were five minutes long and presented exercises and information to promote children's physical fitness. Olympic gold medalist Mary Lou Retton hosted the series, assisted by the "Funfit Kids" (Ericka Pazcoquin, Bradley Kane, Melissa Kern and Efrain Bracero). The show was choreographed by Lynne Taylor-Corbett. The album ABC Funfit featuring Mary Lou Retton was released in 1985. The segment replaced Schoolhouse Rock!. ABC Funfit would subsequently be replaced by The Fun Fact with Yakov Smirnoff, part of an effort by ABC to move toward an older, broader audience.
