= Pink Panther and Sons =

1984 American animated television series

- Genre: Comedy
- Based on: The Pink Panther created by David H. DePatie; Friz Freleng and Blake Edwards' films
- Directed by: Oscar Dufau; Carl Urbano
- Voices of: Gregg Berger; Billy Bowles; Marshall Efron; Jeannie Elias; Sherry Lynn; Shane McCob; Sonny Melendrez; B.J. Ward; Frank Welker
- Theme music composer: Henry Mancini
- Opening theme: "Sons of the Panther"
- Ending theme: "Sons of the Panther" (Instrumental)
- Composer: Rob Walsh
- Country of origin: United States
- Original language: English
- No. of episodes: 13 (26 segments) (list of episodes)

Production
- Executive producers: William Hanna; Joseph Barbera
- Producers: David H. DePatie; Kay Wright
- Editors: Gil Iverson; Robert Ciaglia
- Running time: 20–22 minutes (10–11 minutes per segment)
- Production companies: Hanna-Barbera Productions; Mirisch-Geoffrey-DePatie-Freleng; MGM/UA Television

Original release
- Network: NBC
- Release: September 8 – December 1, 1984

Related
- The Pink Panther

Pink Panther and Sons is an American animated television series produced by Hanna-Barbera Productions and Mirisch-Geoffrey-DePatie-Freleng. The series was originally broadcast on NBC from 1984 to 1985, with reruns airing on ABC in 1986. Friz Freleng (a close friend of Joseph Barbera and William Hanna since all three worked on the Metro-Goldwyn-Mayer cartoon studio in the 1930s) served as creative producer for the series as his and David H. DePatie's production company, DePatie–Freleng Enterprises, was used as an in-name-only enterprise by this time, as it was acquired by Marvel Productions in 1981. The show is based on the Pink Panther, a character created in 1963.

== Plot ==
The series centers on The Pink Panther's two sons: pre-teen Pinky, his toddler brother, Panky and their friends in the Rainbow Panthers (the pretty Chatta, fighting Rocko, gibberish-talking Murfel, overalls-wearing Annie, and cap-wearing Punkin). Each episode shows the Rainbow Panthers coming together in friendship as they learn about growing up and compete with a group of lions called the Howl Angels.

Each episode features a one minute cartoon short featuring The Pink Panther between the main cartoons with Pinky and Panky.

== Characters ==
=== Rainbow Panthers ===
- Pinky Panther (voiced by Billy Bowles) - Pinky is a very polite young panther. Pinky generally ends up having trouble in situations, such as turning six inches tall in "Pink Shrink", and is the one who comes up with most of the ideas. He is the leader of the Rainbow Panthers and he is in love with Chatta, a purple panther in the group.
- Panky Panther (voiced by B.J. Ward) – Panky is Pinky's little brother. His diaper is never tied correctly and he holds it up wherever he goes. Since he is a toddler, he is considered very impressionable, and tends to wander from his older brother.
- Chatta (voiced by Sherry Lynn) – Chatta is a purple panther. She is in love with Pinky and often tries to impress him to win his affection. She also has an enormous vocabulary.
- Murfel (voiced by Shane McCob) – Murfel is a green panther who wears an oversized knit cap. Murfel usually mumbles or slurs when he speaks, making it difficult for the audience to understand what he is saying, but the other members of the Rainbow Panthers understand him perfectly.
- Rocko (voiced by Frank Welker) – Rocko is a yellow panther who is the most athletic of the group. Eager and energetic, he wears sporting boxing gloves and shorts.
- Annie O'Gizmo (voiced by Jeannie Elias) – Annie is an orange panther who wears overalls and a hard hat. She is very scientific and is considered the intellectual of the group.
- Punkin (voiced by B.J. Ward) – Punkin is a blue panther who wears a baseball cap and a wool sweater. He tends to confuse words and often requires multiple attempts to say what he means.

=== Howl Angels ===
- Finko (voiced by Frank Welker) – Finko is the leader of the Howl Angels. An orange-colored lion with a multicolored mohawk, Finko is a rival to Pinky and was Panky's babysitter in the episode "Sitter Jitters".
- Howl (voiced by Marshall Efron) – Howl is a diminutive lion and the partner to Finko. He wears a saucepan on his head as a helmet.
- Liona (voiced by Jeannie Elias) – Liona is a lioness who is tough but pretty. She has a crush on Pinky where she and Chatta fight for his affection.
- Bowlhead and Buckethead (voiced by Gregg Berger and Sonny Melendrez) – Bowlhead and Buckethead are two of Howl Angels' members and are often paired together when partaking in the Howl Angels' schemes, usually serving as comic relief. Fitting to their names, Bowlhead wears on his head a bowl adorned with horns, while Buckethead wears an iron bucket.

=== Other ===
- The Pink Panther – Celebrity star of film and television and the father of Pinky and Panky. While he doesn't speak, Pinky and Panky often understand his gestures even when they go to him for advice.

== Voice cast ==
- Gregg Berger as Bowlhead
- Billy Bowles as Pinky
- Marshall Efron as Howl
- Jeannie Elias as Annie O'Gizmo, Liona
- Sherry Lynn as Chatta
- Shane McCob as Murfel
- Sonny Melendrez as Buckethead
- B.J. Ward as Panky, Punkin
- Frank Welker as Rocko, Finko, Prehistoric Panther (in "The Pink Link"), Truck Driver (in "The Pink Link")

=== Additional voices ===
- Bob Arbogast
- Hamilton Camp as Cousin Punky (in "The Pink Link")
- Rick Cimino
- Peter Cullen
- Rick Dees
- Barry Dennen
- Paul Eiding
- Paul Ely
- Phillip Hartman
- Erv Immerman
- Ralph James
- Tommy Lasorda as Himself (in "Pinky at the Bat")
- Allan Lurie
- Don Messick as Alien (in "Pink Encounters of the Panky Kind"), Film Festival Announcer (in "The Pink Link")
- Cliff Norton
- Roger Rose
- Neil Ross
- Michael Rye
- William Schallert
- Andre Stojka as Mr. Right
- Michael Villani
- William Windom

== Episodes ==
No.	Title	Written by	Original release date
1	"Spinning Wheels"	Cliff Roberts	September 8, 1984
1	"Pinky at the Bat"	Glenn Leopold	September 8, 1984
"Spinning Wheels": A local bike shop is looking for a representative in the Big Bike race and can only sponsor one racer. After Finko was too afraid to do the Big Bike race because of him not wanting Pinky and his friends to laugh at him, he decides to make Howl do the Big Bike race instead of himself. Pinky and Howl compete in a one-on-one bike race to win a chance to be sponsored by the bike shop held in the City Park. However, Finko takes the unfair approach to ensure Pinky loses. "Pinky at the Bat": The Rainbow Panthers have a baseball battle against the Howl Angels with the loser leaving the City's Park baseball field. Meanwhile, the Pink Panther buys tickets for Pinky and his friends, the Rainbow Panthers, to watch the Ducksters play at Duckster Stadium where they meet Tommy Lasorda.
2	"The Great Bumpo"	Jim Ryan	September 15, 1984
2	"Take a Hike"	Lane Raichert	September 15, 1984
"The Great Bumpo": The Rainbow Panthers must hide a baby elephant named Bumpo from a corrupt circus owner. But when the corrupt circus owner puts a bounty on the elephant, this motivates the Howl Angels to capture it. "Take a Hike": The Rainbow Panthers hike in the wilderness, but when Panky wanders off without the other panthers knowing, it leads to hijinks for the Rainbow Panthers while they search to find Panky.
3	"Haunted Howlers"	John Bates	September 22, 1984
3	"Traders of the Lost Bark"	Glenn Leopold	September 22, 1984
"Haunted Howlers": After the Rainbow Panthers lose their model plane inside an old house, they go inside to retrieve it. However, the Howl Angels have a plan to scare them out and receive the plane for themselves. "Traders of the Lost Bark": Panky receives a puppy for his birthday where Pinky names it Wildfire, only for the puppy to run away within minutes. Pinky decides to make wanted posters to find the dog. This leads the Howl Angels in peruse to find Wildfire first so they can sell the dog to a family for money.
4	"Pink Enemy #1"	Denis Higgins	September 29, 1984
4	"Pink Encounters of the Panky Kind"	Glenn Leopold	September 29, 1984
"Pink Enemy #1": When the Pink Panther is arrested for a bank robbery, Pinky recruits the Rainbow Panthers to solve the mystery of who really did the crime and prove his father's innocence. "Pink Encounters of the Panky Kind": The Rainbow Panthers renovate their clubhouse and have their sleepover in it only to have Howl Angels invade it. Afterwards, Panky gets abducted by aliens and replaced with a robotic duplicate.
5	"Millionaire Murfel"	John Bates	October 6, 1984
5	"The Pursuit of Panky"	Glenn Leopold	October 6, 1984
"Millionaire Murfel": When the Rainbow Panthers decide to help out with a fund for wildlife, they meet up with a rich version of Murfel named Graystrips who trades places with their friend for the day. "The Pursuit of Panky": When a nearby government base unveils a new invention called the Electro-Jammer, which has bizarre effects on electrical devices, two thieves attempt to steal it, but they lose it and attempts to find it. Meanwhile, while Pink Panther goes to Mexico, the Electro-Jammer lands inside Panky's diaper, leading to a wild goose chase when Pink Panther remembers he left his passport at home.
6	"Sitter Jitters"	Jim Ryan	October 13, 1984
6	"The Fix Up, Foul-Up"	Lane Raichert	October 13, 1984
"Sitter Jitters": Pinky goes to the cinema with Chatta and Finko babysits Panky as Panky is too young for a horror movie, but Panky keeps escaping from home and going to the cinema. "The Fix Up, Foul-Up": The Rainbow Panthers try to find a worthy painting to help their friends the Johnsons so that the Johnsons can use the money to keep their house from being repossessed and subsequently demolished.
7	"Joking Genie"	Denis Higgins	October 20, 1984
7	"Panky's Pet"	Glenn Leopold	October 20, 1984
"Joking Genie": Pinky and Panky find a lamp that contains a genie. "Panky's Pet": While Pinky, Panky, and their friends and their parents are on a vacation, Panky finds an egg from a cliff which hatches a hungry baby dinosaur, whose appetite disrupts the panthers' fun.
8	"Punkin's Home Companion"	Jim Ryan	October 27, 1984
8	"Insanity Claus"	Lane Raichert	October 27, 1984
"Punkin's Home Companion": After seeing how weird Punkin acts around animals, the Rainbow Panthers create a hairball monster named Blobbo who goes on a rampage when Punkin misreads the instructions for its care. "Insanity Claus": A person dressed as Santa Claus breaks into Pinky and Panky's house and only Panky believes it to be the real Santa. After having the person sent to jail, the other panthers discover that it was the real Santa Claus and decide to bail him out.
9	"Rocko's Last Round"	Glenn Leopold	November 3, 1984
9	"Sleeptalking Chatta"	John Semper and Cynthia Friedlob	November 3, 1984
"Rocko's Last Round": A misunderstanding at the doctor's office causes the rest of the Rainbow Panthers to think that Rocko is dying, so they decide to bring him gifts, including a visit from Rocko's idol, Max Force. "Sleeptalking Chatta": Chatta wins a radio contest, but her sleepwalking causes trouble for the Rainbow Panthers. Meanwhile, Howl and Finko try to take her off course so that they win the contest.
10	"Pink Shrink"	Denis Higgins	November 11, 1984
10	"The Pink Link"	Glenn Leopold	November 11, 1984
"Pink Shrink": Annie's shrink machine causes Pinky to become six inches tall. "The Pink Link": While the Pink Panther is preparing for a film festival, Pinky and Panky help to prepare their house for the arrival of Cousin Punky. Meanwhile, an archaeologist had discovered a prehistoric panther frozen in a block of ice. After a mishap during its transportation, the prehistoric panther becomes defrosted and ends up at Pinky's clubhouse who mistakes it as Cousin Punky. The prehistoric panther is unfamiliar with a modern city and behaves much in the way of wild panthers upon hearing different bells.
11	"Annie's Invention"	Jim Ryan	November 18, 1984
11	"Panky and the Angels"	Glenn Leopold	November 18, 1984
"Annie's Invention": Annie invents a machine to make orange juice, and a company hires her believing that the machine generates energy. "Panky and the Angels": During a "top secret" meeting, the other members of the Rainbow Panthers exclude Panky from it, so Panky decides to join with the Howl Angels. However, he leaves them when Finko demands more money for dues than Panky has. So Panky decides to go and find his own clubhouse and decides on a train caboose. When he jars its brakes loose and goes rolling off uncontrollably, Pinky saves him. Panky then learns they were planning his birthday party in the meeting he was excluded in and rejoins the Rainbow Panthers.
12	"Arabian Frights"	John Bates	November 25, 1984
12	"Brothers Are Special"	Denis Higgins	November 25, 1984
"Arabian Frights": When Panky has trouble sleeping one night, his brother reads him a story about two panthers and a band of thieves who steal candy. After hearing the intro, Panky dreams about the story with him, his brother, and all their friends and enemies as the characters within the story. By the end of the story, Pinky falls asleep and dreams about being the larger of the two sons. "Brothers Are Special": When Pinky prepares for his act for a talent show, he upsets his brother Panky, who ends up in a bear cage. Meanwhile, the Howl Angels plan to win the contest by pretending to play instruments and using a recording over them.
13	"A Hard Day's Knight"	Lane Raichert	December 1, 1984
13	"Mister Money"	John Bates	December 1, 1984
"A Hard Day's Knight": The Rainbow Panthers tour Medieval Manor, an amusement park featuring a castle and robot knights. "Mister Money": Pinky and Panky want to buy a watch for their father as a present. To help with raising the money, they turn to the Rainbow Panthers and an adult purple panther who uses the alias Mr. Wright.

== Other media ==
A children's book called Pink Panther and Sons: Fun at the Picnic was based on the series. Unlike the series, the Pink Panther speaks in the book. The story involves around the Pink Panther being hired as a magician for a party and asked Pinky to assist him, upsetting Panky who felt left out. The Pink Panther decides to start his act creating "two Pink Panthers!" displaying Pinky and Panky onstage.

== Streaming media ==
In October 2023, the complete series was became available on MGM+ and other digital platforms.
