= Kidd Video =

American television series

- Title card used during the first season
- Genre: Animated series Sitcom
- Created by: Jean Chalopin; Andy Heyward; Haim Saban; Shuki Levy
- Developed by: Jim Carlson (season 1); Terrence McDonnell (season 1); Tracy Mays (season 2)
- Directed by: Bernard Deyriès (cartoon, season 1); Richard Raynis (cartoon, season 2); Bud Schaetzle (live-action)
- Starring: Bryan Scott; Steve Alterman; Gabriela Nelson; Robbie Rist
- Voices of: Michael Bell (season 2); Cathy Cavadini; Marshall Efron; Hal Rayle (season 2); Peter Renaday; Susan Silo; Robert Towers
- Theme music composer: Haim Saban, Shuki Levy
- Opening theme: "Video to Radio"
- Ending theme: "Video to Radio"
- Composers: Shuki Levy; Haim Saban
- Country of origin: United States
- Original language: English
- No. of seasons: 2
- No. of episodes: 26

Production
- Executive producers: Jean Chalopin; Andy Heyward; Haim Saban; Shuki Levy
- Producers: Tetsuo Katayama; Shuki Levy; Bud Schaetzle
- Production locations: Los Angeles, California (live action segments)
- Running time: 21 minutes
- Production companies: Saban Productions; DIC Enterprises

Original release
- Network: NBC
- Release: September 8, 1984 – December 7, 1985

Kidd Video (originally in development as Hot Rocks) is an American Saturday morning live action/cartoon created by DIC Enterprises in association with Saban Productions. The series originally ran on NBC from 1984 to 1985. Reruns continued on the network until 1987 when CBS picked the show up.

In the show, four teenagers are taken into a strange dimension called "the Flipside" and become cartoon characters, forced to fight the Master Blaster and his gang, the Copy Cats. The show included then-current music videos.

Ownership of the series passed to Disney in 2001 when Disney acquired Fox Kids Worldwide, which also includes Saban Entertainment.

== Premise ==
The title sequence explained the plot; Kidd Video and his band (Named Kidd, Carla, Ash, and Whiz) of the same name (played by live action performers in the first half of the title sequence) were practicing in a storage unit when an animated villain named the Master Blaster appeared, and transported them to the Master Blaster's home dimension, a cartoon world called the Flipside. The Master Blaster plans to use them as his musical slaves. They were rescued by a fairy named Glitter and subsequently spent each episode of the series either helping to free the denizens of the Flipside from the Master Blaster's rule, or trying to find a way back home to the real world.

The show was dominated by an MTV-esque music video theme. Each episode featured at least one action sequence set to a popular song, and the heroes would often distract their enemies by showing current music videos and sneak off while the enemies were entranced. Each episode also ended with a live-action music video by Kidd Video. Other pop cultural current events featured heavily in the show as well: the characters often breakdanced to relax, rode on skateboards and one episode was devoted entirely to video games. The visual style of the cartoon itself was heavily influenced by the more surreal videos showing on MTV and by album artwork of the era by artists like Roger Dean.

The band was created specifically for the show; they performed their own songs and they provided the voices for their cartoon counterparts. At the end of some episodes, the live action band would be shown once again performing a music video, such as "A Little TLC".

The music videos produced by Kidd Video became popular in Israel, which later produced merchandise such as coloring books and chocolate bars featuring images of the band.

== Characters ==
- Kidd Video (voiced and portrayed by Bryan Scott) is the lead singer and guitarist of Kidd Video.
- Carla (voiced and portrayed by Gabriela Nelson) is a drummer of Kidd Video and the band's sole female member. Her frequently-uttered catch-phrase was "Aye Yai Yai!"
- Ash (voiced and portrayed by Steve Alterman) is a clumsy keyboardist of Kidd Video and also plays bass and saxophone.
- Whiz (voiced and portrayed by Robbie Rist) is a nerdy guitar-and bass-player of Kidd Video. He owned a Subaru BRAT which was in the garage at the time of the band's abduction and also got pulled into the Flipside, where it was transformed into a large futuristic motorhome. As a result, it now serves as the group's main transport through the music world.
- Glitter (voiced by Cathy Cavadini) is a fairy who befriends Kidd Video's band. She saved them from the Master Blaster, as seen in the introduction, with her unique ability to temporarily gain enhanced strength whenever she sneezes.
- Toolbot (voiced by Hal Rayle) is a robotic toolbox that debuted in Season Two and is Whiz's pet.
- The Master Blaster (voiced by Peter Renaday) is a primary antagonist of the series. He brought Kidd Video's band to the Flipside to be his musical slaves until Glitter freed them. As a caricature of a corrupt music executive, the Master Blaster flew around the sky in his floating castle, which resembled a giant jukebox. Master Blaster rides around on an office-themed hoverchair.
  - The Talking Skull is a robotic skull with a snake-like body who acts as the living security system in Master Blaster's lair whose sounds startle everyone.
  - The Crystal Square is a television-like device in a crystal that the Master Blaster always consults on how to further his plots.
- The Copycats are a trio of anthropomorphic cats that serve as the Master Blaster's minions. They get their name because they always lip-synch to their songs. They consist of:
  - Cool Kitty (voiced by Robert Towers) is the leader of the Copycats who wears and open jacket and a skinny tie.
  - Fat Cat (voiced by Marshall Efron) is an overweight member of the Copycats who wears a jacket and vest.
  - She-Lion (voiced by Susan Silo) is the female member of the Copycats who wears a pink jacket, yellow leotard, and sandals.

== List of episodes ==
=== Pilot (1984) ===
1. Pilot - September 8, 1984

=== Season 1 (1984–85) ===
1. To Beat the Band - September 15, 1984
2. The Master Zapper - September 22, 1984
3. Woofers and Tweeters - October 6, 1984
4. Barnacolis - October 13, 1984
5. The Pink Sphinx - October 27, 1984
6. Cienega - February 16, 1985
7. The Lost Note - February 23, 1985
8. Music Sports - March 2, 1985
9. Chameleons - March 23, 1985
10. Euphonius and the Melodious Dragon - May 4, 1985
11. Professor Maestro - May 11, 1985
12. Grooveyard City - May 18, 1985
13. The Stone - May 25, 1985

=== Season 2 (1985) ===
1. The Dream Machine - November 2, 1985
2. Double Trouble - November 2, 1985
3. No Place Like Home - November 9, 1985
4. Having a Ball - November 16, 1985
5. Old Time Rocks that Roll - November 23, 1985
6. Starmaker - November 23, 1985
7. Narra Takes a Powder - November 23, 1985
8. Race to Popland - November 23, 1985
9. Master Blaster Brat - November 23, 1985
10. Twilight Double Header - November 23, 1985
11. A Friend in Need - November 30, 1985
12. Pirates and Puzzles - November 30, 1985
13. Who's in the Kitchen with Dinah? - December 7, 1985

== Music ==
The theme song, "Video to Radio", was written by frequent musical collaborators Haim Saban and Shuki Levy, who also contributed other songs to the show. The song "Time" was written by band member Bryan Scott. The song "A Little TLC" (composed by Lynsey de Paul and Terry Britten) and its accompanying video was featured at the end of the first episode "To Beat the Band" and at the end of the last episode "Who's in the Kitchen with Dinah?".

Kidd Video released a vinyl album in Israel and the band reportedly toured there in 1987.

The TV Show Hits (1986)
No.	Title	Writer(s)	Length
1.	"Video to Radio"	Haim Saban, Shuki Levy	3:40
2.	"Where Did Our Love Go"	Brian Holland, Lamont Dozier	2:38
3.	"It's Over When the Phone Stops Ringing"	Bernie Taupin, Holly Knight	3:02
4.	"A Little TLC"	Lynsey de Paul, Terry Britten	3:30
5.	"We Should Be Together"	Jay Gruska, Tom Keane	3:05
6.	"Come Back to Me"	Haim Saban, Shuki Levy	3:40
7.	"You Better Run"	Haim Saban, Shuki Levy	3:37
8.	"Video Romeo"	Gary Goetzman, Muike Piccirillo	4:12
9.	"Time"	Bryan Scott	4:02
10.	"Turn Me Up"	Lisa Popel, Willie Wilkerson	3:59
11.	"Easy Love"	Haim Saban, Shuki Levy	4:00

== Home media ==
Six VHS tapes were released in the United States from DiC Video & Golden Books (with some only containing a single episode and others containing multiple episodes) and numerous Spanish-language tapes were available from Vídeo Peques under the Travelling Video line.
