= Scrabble (game show) =

US television game show

- Genre: Game show
- Created by: Muriel Green
- Directed by: Chris Darley
- Presented by: Chuck Woolery; Raven-Symoné; Craig Ferguson
- Announcer: Jay Stewart; Charlie Tuna
- Theme music composer: Marc Ellis; Ray Ellis
- Country of origin: United States
- No. of seasons: 10
- No. of episodes: 1,458 (1984–1990); 90 (1993; 1 unaired); 40 (2024–present)

Production
- Executive producer: Robert Noah
- Producer: Gary Johnson
- Production locations: NBC Studios; Burbank, California
- Running time: 22 minutes
- Production companies: Reg Grundy Productions (1984–1993); Exposure Unlimited (1984–1993); Hasbro Entertainment (2024–present); Mattel Television (2024–2025); Mattel Studios (2026–present); Lionsgate Alternative Television (2024–present)

Original release
- Network: NBC
- Release: July 2, 1984 – March 23, 1990
- Release: January 18 – June 11, 1993
- Network: The CW
- Release: October 3, 2024 – present

Scrabble is an American television game show based upon the board game Scrabble. Contestants competed in a series of rounds to fill in words within a crossword puzzle for cash. Muriel Green of Exposure Unlimited, a prize fulfillment company for game shows, developed the idea for a television game show based upon the board game. During 1983, Green convinced Selchow and Righter, who at that time owned the Scrabble board game, to license Exposure Unlimited to produce the game show. Exposure Unlimited co-produced the show with Reg Grundy Productions, and licensed the show to NBC. Scrabble aired on NBC from July 2, 1984, to March 23, 1990, and again from January 18 to June 11, 1993. Chuck Woolery hosted the program. Jay Stewart was the announcer for the first year. Charlie Tuna replaced him in mid-1985 and remained through the original run and the entirety of the 1993 revival.

A new version of Scrabble—unrelated to this version—hosted by Raven-Symoné premiered on October 3, 2024, on The CW. On May 19, 2025, it was renewed for a second season, with new host Craig Ferguson. On October 27, Ferguson announced on his podcast Joy that 60 episodes would be produced. The second season premiered on January 22, 2026. On August 3, 2026, the revival was renewed for a third season, which premieres on February 18, 2027.

== Game play ==
All words used in the game were between five and nine letters in length. For each word, Woolery gave a clue that often involved a pun or play on words (e.g., "Some people want him to get off their case" for "detective"). Viewers could win a Scrabble T-shirt by submitting a word and clue and having them selected for use in the show's opening sequence.

=== Crossword Round ===
The first round of every game was the Crossword round, in which two contestants competed to guess words as they were laid out on a computer-generated Scrabble board. Each matchup in Crossword was always male vs. female and was played until one contestant won by solving three words.

Originally, the Crossword round was played to determine who would face the show's returning champion, if there was one, in the Scrabble Sprint. In cases where there was no returning champion, two Crosswords were played and the winners faced each other in the Sprint to determine the new champion.

Beginning on September 29, 1986, as part of a broader format change, the show began featuring two Crossword rounds per episode. The winners competed against each other in the Sprint to determine the winner. The change was made as part of a special tournament that was taking place at the time. Once the show returned to regular play in December 1986, the first Crossword of the day began featuring the returning champion.

A horizontal or vertical row of squares was outlined to indicate the number of letters, with one already filled in and referred to as the letter the contestants were "building on". The first word of each game was oriented horizontally and built on a letter placed in the center square of the board. Each subsequent word built on one of the letters in the previous word and was laid out perpendicular to it (i.e., the first word was played horizontally, the second vertically, and so on). If a game went on so long that the board became too crowded to hold any more words, it was cleared and the next was played horizontally from a letter in the center square.

Initially, the winner of a backstage coin toss got to start each game. When the second Crossword was introduced and the champion was inserted into the first game, his/her opponent started. If a champion retired after five days, a backstage coin toss in the first Crossword determined who began the first game. The second game used a coin toss to determine who began.

The contestant with initial control of a word could either try to guess it immediately or draw two numbered tiles from a rack. Each tile represented a letter, which was revealed on a screen when the contestant inserted it into a slot at his/her desk. Once a contestant drew tiles, he/she could only guess after playing at least one of the two letters.

The number of tiles available for any given word was always two more than the number of letters it contained. These tiles represented all of the remaining letters in the word, plus three "stopper" letters that did not belong. When a contestant played a letter that belonged in the word, it appeared in its proper place. Hitting a stopper or giving an incorrect guess forfeited control of the word to the opponent, who could either guess or draw enough tiles to put a total of two letters in play.

Once all but one letter had been filled in, the contestant in control had to guess. A miss gave the opponent a chance to solve the word. If he/she also missed, the last letter was filled in and neither contestant scored the word.

For each word after the first, the trailing contestant had initial control. If the score was tied, control went to the contestant who had not solved the previous word.

During the original show format, each match was played to its conclusion. A match began at any time and resumed on the next episode. Originally, a fresh board was used when the match resumed. This later changed to having the same board in place for an entire match regardless of whether or not it straddled.

==== Speedword ====
If all three stoppers were revealed during a word, the contestant that had not played the last one was given a chance to guess. If he/she declined to do so, a rapid-fire game called "Speedword" was played. The remaining letters would be automatically placed, one at a time, until someone rang in with a correct guess. However, a miss locked that contestant out of the rest of the word. If both contestants missed, or if neither one rang in after every letter but one had been placed, the word was revealed and removed from play. If a contestant gave an incorrect guess after his/her opponent played the third stopper, the opponent was allowed to play Speedword alone.

Beginning in March 1985, Speedword was also played if a match went to a fifth word without a winner. Later, Speedword was played if time ran short during a match.

==== Pot ====
In the first seven shows, a cumulative money pot was used in the Crossword round. Each letter placed in a normal square was worth $25, with blue squares adding $50 and pink squares $100. The winner of the round collected all the money in the pot. After that week, the Crossword winner received a flat $500.

==== Bonus squares ====
Beginning in October 1984, contestants won a cash bonus by placing a letter in a colored square and immediately solving the word. Blue squares awarded $500, while pink squares awarded $1,000. Beginning in September 1985, the bonus rule was added to Speedword, provided a contestant guessed the word right after a letter was placed into a bonus square. Also, if a word was built on a letter in a bonus square, the contestant who started the word could win the bonus with an immediate solve. If a contestant either placed a letter in a bonus square and gave an incorrect guess, or could not solve the word after placing the next-to-last letter in a bonus square, the opponent won the bonus with a correct guess. Both contestants kept any bonus money they won, regardless of who won the Crossword round.

For the 1993 version, money won from bonus squares was added to the Bonus Sprint jackpot instead of being awarded directly to the contestant.

==== Spelling format ====
The Crossword rules and payout structure were changed in April 1985. Once the contestant in control believed they could solve a word, they hit their buzzer and then had to fill in all the missing letters in order, one at a time. A mistake turned control over to the opponent and left all correctly given letters on the board. The opponent could then either try to complete the solution, draw/play tiles if no letters had been filled in, or the word would be removed from play.

The accumulating pot from the earliest episodes returned, but money was added to it only while a contestant gave letters after buzzing in. Regular, blue, and pink squares respectively added $50, $100, and $200 (later $500 in June), and the first contestant to solve three words won the entire pot.

The format was changed back to the original Crossword format on September 2, 1985. In announcing the change, Chuck Woolery cited that popular demand had resulted in the decision.

=== Scrabble Sprint ===
The Scrabble Sprint round was the second part of the game and determined the show's champion. In this round, the goal was to solve a set of words of increasing length as quickly as possible. There were two different formats.

From the premiere until September 26, 1986, the Crossword rounds were played to determine who faced the reigning champion in the Sprint Round. If there was no champion, two Crossword rounds were played and the winners of those rounds faced off to determine a new champion.

==== First format ====
In the first format, both the champion and the Crossword winner played separate sets of words against the clock. The Crossword winner played first and chose one of two envelopes, leaving the other for the champion. A row of blanks was shown, and Woolery read a clue. Once the contestant stated that he/she was ready, the clock began to count up from zero and two letters were displayed, which the contestant called one at a time to place in the word. Additional letters were then displayed one at a time, but as in Crossword, the last letter was not given. Every displayed letter appeared in the word. No stoppers were used in the Sprint.

Before trying to guess the word, the contestant had to press a plunger in order to stop the clock. If the guess was correct, the remaining letters were filled in. If incorrect, or if the contestant did not immediately offer a guess, a ten-second penalty was added to the clock and play continued with the same word. Once all but one of the letters were placed, the contestant had five seconds to guess. If he/she either missed the word or did not press the plunger, the word was removed and an alternate was played.

Once the Crossword winner correctly solved three words, the champion took his/her turn with the unused envelope. The clock counted toward zero, starting at the Crossword winner's final time, and any penalties were deducted from it. If the champion completed his/her words before time ran out, he/she won the Scrabble Sprint. If not, the opponent became the new champion. The prize for winning was originally three times the pot from the preceding Crossword round, but was changed to a flat $1,500 after the first week.

Under this format, a champion could play up to ten Sprint rounds. Winning five consecutive Sprints earned any contestant that did so a $20,000 bonus. If a contestant managed to reach the maximum ten wins, he/she would win another $20,000 bonus.

===== March 1985 changes =====
In March 1985, both contestants began using the same set of words. The champion was placed in isolation while the Crossword winner played, then tried to beat the time set. In addition, after a contestant called one of the two displayed letters, the other one disappeared and two new letters were presented as long as there were at least three blanks left in the word. The contestant was shown only one letter when there were two blanks. This change remained in place for the remainder of the series, and a fourth word was later added to the Sprint.

The Sprint bonus rules changed in addition to the contestants now using the same set of words. Reaching five wins augmented a champion's winnings to $20,000, while a retired ten-time champion saw their winnings augmented to $40,000.

==== Second format ====
On September 29, 1986, Scrabble began a 13-week-long contest titled The $100,000 All-American Scrabble Tournament. This tournament was conducted with a different format from usual Scrabble matches, and these changes were eventually made permanent.

A total of 188 contestants were selected via a nationwide search, with four competing on each episode in preliminary matches from Monday through Thursday over the first 12 weeks. Two Crossword rounds were played, each worth $500 and with the bonus square payouts in effect, and each was followed by a four-word Scrabble Sprint. The first Crossword winner set a time for the second one to beat, and the Sprint winner received $1,000 and advanced to a quarterfinal match played on Friday of that week. The winner of the Sprint round in that match received an additional $5,000 and advanced to the semifinals, held during the 13th and final week of the tournament.

Four wild-card semifinalists were chosen from the eliminated contestants, and they and the 12 quarterfinal winners competed in four semifinal matches on Monday through Thursday of the final week. The four winners advanced to a final match that Friday; the winner of the Sprint received a grand prize of $100,000, while the runner-up received $10,000.

With slight adjustments, this tournament structure became the new permanent format on December 29, 1986. Each episode now featured four contestants and two Crossword games worth $500 each. The champion played in the first Crossword, whose winner set a Sprint time for the second winner to beat, and the Sprint winner received $1,000 and took or retained the championship. With this format change, each episode of Scrabble became a self-contained competition and straddling games were eliminated.

===== Bonus Sprint =====
With the adoption of the new format came a new final round, the Bonus Sprint, which gave the day's champion a chance to win a cash jackpot.

The champion played two words, one each of at least six and seven letters, under the standard Sprint rules, and was given ten seconds to solve them both. Doing so awarded the jackpot, which began at $5,000 and increased by $1,000 for every game it went unclaimed. The round ended immediately if the champion gave an incorrect guess or failed to respond.

Champions remained on the show until they lost in either the Crossword or Sprint round or had played the Bonus Sprint five times.

====== 1993 changes ======
When the series returned in 1993, the Bonus Sprint jackpot began at $1,000 and increased only if a contestant landed on a blue or pink square in the Crossword game and solved the word immediately, adding either $500 or $1,000 respectively. No cash bonuses were given directly to contestants in this version. The Bonus Sprint jackpot carried over from one episode to the next until it was won.

== Other Tournaments ==
During the 1984–90 run, Scrabble held occasional tournaments, including two Tournament of Champions in February 1985 and May 1986, a $25,000 TV Game Contestants vs. Board Game Contestants tournament in November 1985, a $50,000 Teen Tournament in July 1986, and the All-American Tournament. In the February 1985 tournament the final grand prize was determined by the amount of $500 and $1,000 bonuses won in the Crossword Round, with $35,000 as the base amount, a payout structure later used for the Bonus Sprint in the 1993 revival. The other tournament in May 1986 was played for $50,000.

== Licensed merchandise ==
A board game based on this version was released by Selchow & Righter as TV Scrabble in 1987.

== Broadcast history ==
=== Original run ===
Scrabble premiered in the 11:30 am time slot on July 2, 1984. The time slot had been occupied by the Bob Eubanks-hosted game show Dream House for the past 20 months. The show went up against the highly rated CBS game show The Price Is Right and four ABC game shows (Family Feud, All-Star Blitz, Double Talk, and Bargain Hunters) in its time slot during the first three years of its run. On September 7, 1987, Scrabble was moved to the 12:30 p.m. time slot in order to make room for the daytime version of Win, Lose or Draw (replacing Wordplay, which had been canceled by NBC earlier that summer). The competitors in that time slot were the soap operas The Young and the Restless and Loving. The show lasted 1 1/2 years in that time slot, as it was moved to the 10:00 a.m. time slot on March 27, 1989, after both Sale of the Century (another Reg Grundy show) and Super Password ended their runs. The 12:30 p.m. time slot was taken over by the soap opera Generations. Scrabble aired against the CBS version of Family Feud in that time slot, and remained there until its final episode aired on March 23, 1990. Three days later, the show's time slot was occupied by reruns of 227.

This version of Scrabble aired in reruns from September 16, 1991, to October 13, 1995 (except for a period from February 6 to April 14, 1995) on USA Network. Reruns also briefly aired exclusively on WNBC-TV in New York City from March 26 to September 7, 1990.

=== 1993 revival ===
In late 1992, NBC cancelled the soap opera Santa Barbara after an eight-year run. The network announced it was trading the 3:00 pm timeslot in exchange for the 12:00 pm timeslot from its affiliates. NBC brough back Scrabble and paired it with a new program based on the board game Scattergories hosted by Dick Clark in the noon hour.

However, not all of NBC's affiliates aired the revived Scrabble at its scheduled time due to their continuing practice of airing local newscasts or other syndicated programming at noon. This resulted in some NBC stations airing the show in a different spot on their schedule while others did not air it at all, often relegating it to independent stations in some media markets. In the markets that did air Scrabble at its scheduled time, the show faced off against local programming on other network affiliates, but never fared well enough against them. As a result, NBC canceled Scrabble after twenty-one weeks of episodes and aired its last episode on June 11, 1993. Reruns of Classic Concentration replaced Scrabble on June 14, which aired until December 31. Following this, the final two weeks of Caesars Challenge, which replaced Scattergories, aired at noon before NBC gave the time slot back to its affiliates.

== Scrabble Showdown ==
In September 2011, a game show based on the board game Scrabble titled Scrabble Showdown appeared on the cable network The Hub. Hosted by Justin Willman, the show featured two families, each consisting of a parent and a child, competing against each other in mini games to solve word puzzles for a chance at a grand prize of a trip anywhere in the world. The program, which had no ties to the Woolery version, lasted 30 episodes before ending in April 2012.

== 2024 revival ==
In February 2024, it was announced that Scrabble would be revived and would move to The CW, with Raven-Symoné as host. The revival was promoted as a "straight" adaptation of the board game that would depart from the Woolery version. The revival's first season, which consisted of twenty-six half-hour episodes presented as thirteen hour-long broadcasts, premiered on October 3, 2024. On May 19, 2025, the revival was renewed for a second season of 30 episodes, alongside its sister series, Trivial Pursuit, with Craig Ferguson as host, replacing Raven, who stays as an executive producer. On August 3, 2026, the revival was renewed for a third season to premiere on February 18, 2027.
