= List of The Smurfs (1981 TV series) episodes =

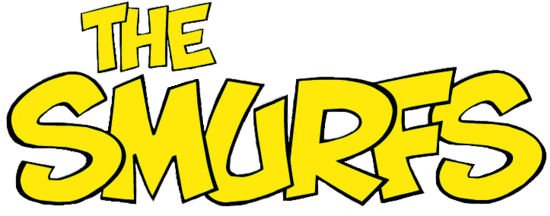

The Smurfs is an animated television series that originally aired on NBC from September 12, 1981, to December 2, 1989. Created by Pierre "Peyo" Culliford and based on his comic books of the same name, it was composed by 256 episodes with 417 stories, but also of three cliffhanger episodes and seven specials. The series was produced by Hanna-Barbera Productions with SEPP International S.A. and Lafig S.A. (on Seasons from 1 to 7 for the first and on Seasons 8 and 9 for the second, respectively).

== Series overview ==
Season	Segments	Episodes	Originally released	
Season	Segments	Episodes	First released	Last released
1	39	26	September 12, 1981	December 5, 1981
2	46	36	September 18, 1982	December 4, 1982
3	55	32	September 17, 1983	November 26, 1983
4	48	26	September 15, 1984	November 17, 1984
5	40	24	September 21, 1985	November 9, 1985
6	61	36	September 13, 1986	November 29, 1986
7	65	36	September 19, 1987	December 5, 1987
8	24	16	September 10, 1988	October 29, 1988
9	39	24	September 9, 1989	December 2, 1989
Specials	N/A	7	November 29, 1981	December 13, 1987

== Episodes ==
=== Season 1 (1981) ===
No. overall	No. in season	Title	Written by	Original release date	Prod. code	U.S. households (millions)
1	1	"The Astrosmurf"	Len Janson (based on a concept by Peyo and Yvan Delporte)	September 12, 1981	0128–8104	4.81
Dreamy makes a birthday wish that he could fly to another planet before blowing out the candles and finds himself on another planet.
2	2	"Jokey's Medicine"	David Villaire	September 12, 1981	0128–8103B	6.85
2	2	"Vanity Fare"	Gene Aryes	September 12, 1981	0128–8101B	6.85
Greedy, Lazy, and Smurfette decide to punish Jokey after so many "surprises". They prank him, but find Azrael and end up captured by Gargamel. Gargamel creates a magical mirror that serves as a portal to a parallel dimension. Vanity, after having his mirror broken in a smurfball match, goes to the forest and finds the mirror, getting trapped inside it.
3	3	"St. Smurf and the Dragon"	J. Michael Reaves	September 19, 1981	0128–8105	4.56
Smurfette brings a baby dragon to the village and takes care of it.
4	4	"Sorcerer Smurf"	J.M. Reaves	September 19, 1981	0128–8107B	6.52
4	4	"The Magical Meanie"	N/A	September 19, 1981	0128–8107A	6.52
The Smurfs travel up a mountain to find Sorcerer Smurf, but of course, Sorcerer Smurf is Gargamel. Brainy and Clumsy find a genie.
5	5	"Bewitched, Bothered and Be-smurfed"	N/A	September 26, 1981	0128–8108	3.67
Hogatha loses her locket and goes to Gargamel for help. Meanwhile, Smurfette finds the locket.
6	6	"King Smurf"	Chuck Menville (based on a concept by Peyo and Yvan Delporte)	September 26, 1981	0128–8103A	5.54
6	6	"The Smurfs and the Howlibird"	J. Michael Reaves (based on a concept by Peyo and Yvan Delporte)	September 26, 1981	0128–8106	5.54
Brainy takes advantage of Papa Smurf's absence and proclaims himself dictator of the village. Smurfette leads a resistance and the Smurfs begin a civil war, which only ends after Papa returns to the village. Note: This episode was paired with "Fuzzle Trouble" in Cartoon Network and Boomerang airings. The Smurfs are threatened by a howlibird and have to find a way to defeat it.
7	7	"Soup a La Smurf"	N/A	October 3, 1981	0128–8110	4.89
Big Mouth wants Soup a La Smurf, thanks to Gargamel.
8	8	"All That Glitters Isn't Smurf"	N/A	October 3, 1981	0128–8111B	6.44
8	8	"Dreamy's Nightmare"	N/A	October 3, 1981	0128–8109B	6.44
Gargamel captures Smurfs to make gold. Papa Smurf then cuts pieces of Smurfette's hair to make gold coins. Dreamy goes on a trip around the world, but gets captured by Gargamel.
9	9	"Romeo and Smurfette"	N/A	October 10, 1981	0128–8112	4.40
Spring arrives, and the Smurfs ask for Smurfette in marriage (even Papa Smurf gets in the match). But Gargamel uses a hypnotic flower and Smurfette becomes “Evil” again, urging Handy and Hefty to fight violently for her love. Papa Smurf then deceives Gargamel with a hypnotic look. Thus, Papa Smurf, once inside the body of Gargamel, "attacks" the village of Smurfs, making everyone back together.
10	10	"The Magic Egg"	N/A	October 10, 1981	0128–8124A	5.87
10	10	"Smurphony in 'C'"	N/A	October 10, 1981	0128–8113B	5.87
The Smurfs find an egg that grants wishes. They quickly succumb to their greed, and their accidental wishes cause chaos. Gargamel tricks Harmony into putting the other Smurfs into a deep sleep.
11	11	"Sideshow Smurfs"	N/A	October 17, 1981	0128–8119	4.48
A man kidnaps Smurfette and Clumsy and the other Smurfs come to their rescue.
12	12	"Supersmurf"	Len Janson	October 17, 1981	0128–8115A	6.11
12	12	"Paradise Smurfed"	N/A	October 17, 1981	0128–8116B	6.11
Brainy gains superpowers to protect the village from Bigmouth. Lazy, Greedy and Brainy find a place that is like paradise, but it was all just a bad dream.
13	13	"Sir Hefty"	N/A	October 24, 1981	0128–8117	5.13
Hefty becomes a knight to protect the village from a dragon.
14	14	"The Fake Smurf"	N/A	October 24, 1981	0128–8116A	6.52
14	14	"The Baby Smurf"	Gene Ayres (based on a concept by Peyo and Yvan Delporte)	October 24, 1981	0128–8115A	6.52
Hogatha turns herself into a Smurf to get back at them for destroying her locket. Gargamel turns himself into a baby Smurf and Smurfette finds him takes him to the village.
15	15	"Painter and Poet"	N/A	October 31, 1981	0128–8121	5.30
Painter and Poet run away due to them not being appreciated by the others, and Gargamel follows them.
16	16	"Haunted Smurf"	N/A	October 31, 1981	0128–8118B	6.93
16	16	"Purple Smurfs"	N/A	October 31, 1981	0128–8118A	6.93
The Smurfs leave to look for food and enter a castle that they think is haunted. A purple fly bites Lazy and he turns purple, causing him to say "GNAP GNAP!" and bite the other Smurfs, turning them into nasty, evil, angry purple smurfs as well.
17	17	"The Fountain of Smurf"	N/A	November 7, 1981	0128–8123	4.81
The Smurfs give Papa Smurf a drink from the Fountain of Youth as gift, but he drinks too much and goes back to being a Smurfling. The Smurfs enlist Gargamel's help to get the book that has the spell to return Papa Smurf to his old self from the troll who took it in exchange for the water from the fountain.
18	18	"The Magnifying Mixture"	N/A	November 7, 1981	0128–8120	6.19
18	18	"Foul Weather Smurf"	N/A	November 7, 1981	0128–8120	6.19
"The Magnifying Mixture": Brainy trips and accidentally enlarges Hefty. "Foul Weather Smurf": Handy makes a machine to control the weather.
19	19	"The Hundredth Smurf"	N/A	November 14, 1981	0128–8113A	5.30
Vanity creates a new mirror out in the woods. Lightning strikes it and creates a new Smurf, which makes an issue for Vanity. Note: This episode was paired with "The Last Laugh" in Cartoon Network and Boomerang airings.
20	20	"The Abominable Snowbeast"	N/A	November 14, 1981	0128–8122	7.01
20	20	"Gargamel, the Generous"	N/A	November 14, 1981	0128–8122	7.01
Some smurfs go to look for snow flower pollen, but Smurfette falls while reaching for it and she finds the Abominable Snowbeast. Gargamel pretends to be nice to the Smurfs so he can get some diamonds.
21	21	"The Smurfette"	Duane Poole, Tom Swale, Len Janson & Chuck Menville	November 21, 1981	0128–8102	4.65
Gargamel creates Smurfette to lure the Smurfs into his hands. Smurfette proves to be a true Smurf when she saves the others from Gargamel.
22	22	"Spelunking Smurfs"	N/A	November 21, 1981	0128–8125A	5.95
22	22	"Now You Smurf 'Em, Now You Don't"	N/A	November 21, 1981	0128–8124B	5.95
Vanity and Clumsy find food for the Smurfs on the hottest day of summer. Greedy and Vanity get captured by trolls using a crystal ball.
23	23	"The Smurf's Apprentice"	Len Janson	November 28, 1981	0128–8101A	4.48
23	23	"Smurf-Colored Glasses"	N/A	November 28, 1981	0128–8109A	4.48
Wanting to be popular, Clumsy steals one of Gargamel's magic spells, but it backfires and turns him into a lizard. Handy makes Smurfette red-lensed glasses which makes everything and everyone look charming. However, Gargamel kidnaps her to make her evil again.
24	24	"The Clockwork Smurf"	N/A	November 28, 1981	0128–8126	5.30
Handy makes Clockwork Smurf. Later, Clockwork leaves the village to help prince Gerald into becoming a king.
25	25	"Fuzzle Trouble"	N/A	December 5, 1981	0128–8111A	4.81
25	25	"Smurfette's Dancing Shoes"	N/A	December 5, 1981	0128–8114A	4.81
Clumsy finds a Fuzzle, which causes havoc in the village. Note: This episode was paired with "King Smurf" in Cartoon Network and Boomerang airings. Smurfette finds an imp that helps her, but in return he wants her hand in marriage.
26	26	"The Smurfs and the Money Tree"	N/A	December 5, 1981	0128–8125B	6.52
Gargamel's abusive mother visits him and helps him do a magic, making a tree of chocolate coins sprout in the backyard of Greedy's house. Note: This episode was paired with "Revenge of the Smurfs" in Cartoon Network and Boomerang airings.

=== Season 2 (1982) ===
No. overall	No. in season	Title	Original release date	Prod. code	U.S. households (in millions)
27	1	"The Smurf Who Couldn't Say No"	September 18, 1982	Smurfs–JP–2B	7.25
Pushover Smurf gets tired of doing every other Smurf's chores. Meanwhile, Scaredy Smurf is supposed to travel and get fire from a bog but sends Pushover instead because he is too afraid.
28	2	"The Adventures of Robin Smurf"	September 18, 1982	Smurfs–JP–19	9.16
The Smurfs put on a play called Robin Smurf.
29	3	"The Cursed Country"	September 18, 1982	Smurfs–JP–1D	8.66
A dragon and his evil master burns down the Smurfs' village and kidnaps most of the Smurfs. Only Smurfette and Hefty are left and they get aid from squire Johan, jester Peewit, and the king.
30	4	"Sister Smurf"	September 25, 1982	Smurfs–JP–1C	5.58
30	4	"S-Shivering S-Smurfs"	September 25, 1982	Smurfs–JP–2C	5.58
Smurfette is tired of being ignored by the male Smurfs and befriends a human girl, Laura, who also doesn't get along with her two male siblings. They decide to create a private club, but become prisoners of an old hag and her ferocious dog. So the Smurfs and Laura's brothers go to save them. Tracker Smurf senses a blizzard coming and the other Smurfs are unprepared.
31	5	"The Black Hellebore"	September 25, 1982	Smurfs–JP–2D	5.75
A wicked potion maker uses black flowers to gain mind control over others.
32	6	"Revenge of the Smurfs"	September 25, 1982	Smurfs–JP–6C	6.08
After Smurfette watches the forest turn into a battlefield by humans, Papa Smurf gets everyone to safety to get away from the humans. Note: This episode was paired with "The Smurfs and the Money Tree" in Cartoon Network and Boomerang airings.
33	7	"The Three Smurfketeers"	October 2, 1982	Smurfs–JP–20B	4.91
The Smurfs put on The Three Smurfketeers.
34	8	"Heavenly Smurf"	October 2, 1982	Smurfs–JP–20A	5.50
34	8	"It Came from Outer Smurf"	October 2, 1982	Smurfs–JP–3C	5.50
When Gargamel faints while chasing the Smurfs, they make him think that he died, and he can only live by being nice to them. Note: This episode was paired with "Symbols of Wisdom" in Cartoon Network and Boomerang airings. An alien disguises itself as a Smurf. Note: This episode was paired with "One Good Smurf Deserves Another" in Cartoon Network and Boomerang airings.
35	9	"The Sorcery of Maltrochu"	October 2, 1982	Smurfs–JP–3D	5.58
Peewit and Johan come to the aid of Sir Terry, who has been turned into a dog by a wicked baron out to steal the knights true love.
36	10	"Squeaky"	October 9, 1982	Smurfs–JP–3A	5.00
36	10	"The Kaplowey Scroll"	October 9, 1982	Smurfs–JP–15A	5.00
Smurfette finds and nurses a sick mouse and she happily adopts him as a pet. However, after the death of the mouse, she became heartbroken and tearfully leaves the village. Note: This episode was paired with "Clumsy Smurfs the Future" in Cartoon Network and Boomerang airings. Clumsy finds the Kaplowey Scroll, which can make anything disappear. Note: This episode was paired with "The Magic Stick" in Cartoon Network and Boomerang airings.
37	11	"The Goblin of Boulder Woods"	October 9, 1982	Smurfs–JP–4D	5.75
Two crooks dress as guards and falsely accuse Peewit of kidnapping the princess.
38	12	"Gormandizing Greedy"	October 9, 1982	Smurfs–JP–1A	7.16
38	12	"Waste Not, Smurf Not"	October 9, 1982	Smurfs–JP–2A	7.16
After seeing Greedy gain a few pounds, Hefty helps him get in shape. Handy builds a machine that picks smurfberries from the bushes the easy way. However, the rest of the Smurfs become wasteful with their food.
39	13	"Johan's Army"	October 16, 1982	Smurfs–JP–5D	5.00
Perot takes the King's castle.
40	14	"The Lost City of Yore"	October 16, 1982	Smurfs–JP–18	5.91
Two witches capture Nosey, Brainy and Clumsy in order to use them to find a scroll that will lead them to the Lost City of Yore.
41	15	"The Magic Fountain"	October 16, 1982	Smurfs–JP–6D	6.00
A storm destroys Johan and Peewit's ship.
42	16	"The Impostor King"	October 23, 1982	Smurfs–JP–8D	4.91
A crook pretends to be the King.
43	17	"For the Love of Gargamel"	October 23, 1982	Smurfs–JP–4C	5.66
43	17	"The A-maze-ing Smurfs"	October 23, 1982	Smurfs–JP–5C	5.66
Gargamel and Azrael get turned to stone and the Smurfs are very happy at this. Malchior the Magnificent is sick and asks Papa Smurf for help. Jokey and a few other Smurfs follow Papa Smurf, much to his dismay.
44	18	"The Haunted Castle"	October 23, 1982	Smurfs–JP–10D	7.25
Papa Smurf, Smurfette, Brainy, Johan and Peewit goes inside a deserted castle for shelter to get away from a terrible rainstorm.
45	19	"Smurfs at Sea"	October 30, 1982	Smurfs–JP–15B	5.00
Papa Smurf tells the Smurfs a story about Dreamy going on an adventure at sea.
46	20	"One Good Smurf Deserves Another"	October 30, 1982	Smurfs–JP–4A	5.33
Clumsy starts doing nice things for Handy after he saves him from Gargamel. Note: This episode was paired with "It Came from Outer Smurf" in Cartoon Network and Boomerang airings.
47	21	"The Blue Plague"	October 30, 1982	Smurfs–JP–3B	6.33
47	21	"The Last Laugh"	October 30, 1982	Smurfs–JP–5A	6.33
After Brainy takes an elixir from Gargamel's castle and pours it in a soup pot, the other Smurfs turn yellow and start to act like birds. After Gargamel sprays Jokey and Grouchy with giggle glitter, they start to laugh uncontrollably. Note: This episode was paired with "The Hundredth Smurf" in Cartoon Network and Boomerang airings.
48	22	"The Raven Wizard"	November 6, 1982	Smurfs–JP–9D	5.41
The Raven Wizard kidnaps Princess Sabina.
49	23	"The Ring of Castellac"	November 6, 1982	Smurfs–JP–11	6.33
A duke escapes from Castellac but loses his ring. The ring is then found by Brainy.
50	24	"The Sky is Smurfing! The Sky is Smurfing!"	November 6, 1982	Smurfs–JP–8A	7.58
50	24	"Turncoat Smurf"	November 6, 1982	Smurfs–JP–7A	7.58
Papa Smurf has a strange cold, so Hefty and Scaredy go on a quest to get some ingredients for Papa's cold remedy. Papa Smurf puts himself to sleep for three days and Brainy gives every Smurf a chore to do.
51	25	"Return of the Clockwork Smurf"	November 13, 1982	Smurfs–JP–13D	5.25
King Gerard's uncle destroys Clockwork Smurf.
52	26	"The Littlest Giant"	November 13, 1982	Smurfs–JP–16A	6.33
The Smurfs meet a toddler named Simon.
53	27	"Bubble, Bubble, Smurfs in Trouble"	November 13, 1982	Smurfs–JP–17A	7.00
53	27	"Smurf Van Winkle"	November 13, 1982	Smurfs–JP–6A	7.00
Scaredy meets a water sprite. The Smurfs tricks Lazy that he thinks that he has sleep for many years.
54	28	"The Prince and the Peewit"	November 20, 1982	Smurfs–JP–14D	6.08
Peewit looks identical to a prince who has escaped.
55	29	"The Enchanted Baby"	November 20, 1982	Smurfs–JP–15D	7.16
A baby disappears and reappears when he is in danger.
56	30	"Clumsy Smurfs the Future"	November 20, 1982	Smurfs–JP–12	8.91
Clumsy finds a rock that tells the future. This episode was paired with "Squeaky" in Cartoon Network and Boomerang airings.
57	31	"Sleepwalking Smurfs"	November 27, 1982	Smurfs–JP–16B	7.00
57	31	"Smurf Me No Flowers"	November 27, 1982	Smurfs–JP–14A	7.00
The Smurfs are sleepwalking, thanks to Gargamel's magic flute. Lazy tries to get rid of his insomnia problem, but due to a misunderstanding by Brainy, the whole village believes that Lazy is about to die. So they organize a party for Lazy, who, however, decides to take a chance on extreme adventures before he dies.
58	32	"The Good, the Bad and the Smurfy"	November 27, 1982	Smurfs–JP–1B	7.83
Mordain, an evil wizard, captures the Smurfs for his king, Aragon.
59	33	"A Mere Truffle"	November 27, 1982	Smurfs–JP–4B	9.50
The Smurfs follow Tracker to get truffles but they are captured by pig like Truffle Trolls.
60	34	"The Stuff Dreams Are Smurfed Of"	December 4, 1982	Smurfs–JP–13A	5.66
60	34	"The Box of Dirty Tricks"	December 4, 1982	Smurfs–JP–15C	5.66
Every Smurf cannot sleep because they had a terrible nightmare. The Smurfs find a magic box and wonder if they should open it.
61	35	"Papa's Wedding Day"	December 4, 1982	Smurfs–JP–14B	6.00
Papa Smurf meets a wood nymph name Flowerbell, but the nymph was sent by Lord Balthazar.
62	36	"All's Smurfy That Ends Smurfy"	December 4, 1982	Smurfs–JP–17B	7.00
Gargamel steals the fairies' gold. The fairies accuses the Smurfs for stealing their gold and starts a war against them.

=== Season 3 (1983) ===
No. overall	No. in season	Title	Written by	Original release date	Prod. code	U.S. households (in millions)
63	1	"Once in a Blue Moon"	Story by : Peyo and Yvan Delporte; Teleplay by : Patsy Cameron, Tedd Anasti, and Gerard Baldwin	September 17, 1983	83–1C	4.94
63	1	"All Creatures Great and Smurf"	Frances Novier	September 17, 1983	83–16A	4.94
Baby Smurf is brought to the village by a stork and everybody, even Grouchy, loves him. But when the stork comes back to the village with a letter, requesting the smurfs to return Baby because the delivery was a mistake, Grouchy runs away with Baby. Nat's love nature goes too far when he brings an injured Azrael to the village. Note: This episode was paired with "Smurfy Acres" in Cartoon Network and Boomerang airings.
64	2	"The Smurf Fire Brigade"	Gerard Baldwin (based on a story by Peyo and Yvan Delporte)	September 17, 1983	83–1E	6.37
64	2	"The Winged Wizard"	Glenn Leopold	September 17, 1983	83–2C	6.37
Handy builds the first fire engine. Gargamel uses his Great Book of Spells to capture the Smurfs.
65	3	"Every Picture Smurfs a Story"	John Bates	September 17, 1983	83–2E	6.96
Magic paint traps Papa Smurf in a painting and the evil Maestro is released.
66	4	"The First Telesmurf"	John Bradford	September 24, 1983	83–2D	4.61
66	4	"Handy's Kite"	Gerard Baldwin	September 24, 1983	83–2B	4.61
The Smurfs are introduced to a telephone system. Lord Balthazar destroys Handy's kite and captures Handy, Dreamy, Brainy and Clumsy.
67	5	"The Magic Earrings"	Paul Dini and John Bonaccorsi	September 24, 1983	83–6B	5.45
Hogatha uses magic earrings to find the Smurf village. Note: This episode was paired with "The Chief Record Smurf" in Cartoon Network and Boomerang airings.
68	6	"The Last Smurfberry"	Gwen Robertshaw and Gerard Baldwin	September 24, 1983	83–4C	6.45
Gargamel destroys all except one smurfberry bush and replants the bush next to his hovel as a trap.
69	7	"A Little Smurf Confidence"	John Bonaccorsi	October 1, 1983	83–3A	4.61
69	7	"Hogatha's Heartthrob"	John Bates	October 1, 1983	83–4B	4.61
The Smurfs use a few ways to give Weakling Smurf some confidence. While trying to save the bridge, Hefty becomes unconscious. Hogatha wants to meet Harlequin.
70	8	"Born Rotten"	Frances Novier	October 1, 1983	83–4A	5.61
70	8	"The Tear of a Smurf"	Frances Novier	October 1, 1983	83–6C	5.61
Gargamel uses scent to find the Smurf village. A hag captures Jokey, Grouchy and Azrael so she can get rid a curse on her..
71	9	"The Miracle Smurfer"	John Bates and Patsy Cameron	October 1, 1983	83–6D	6.70
A fraud tricks the Smurfs into giving their possessions away.
72	10	"The Smurf Who Would Be King"	Chris Jenkyns	October 8, 1983	83–17B	4.86
After an accident on his ship, Dreamy finds himself among a little bears called Pookeys, who worship him as their king. This episode was paired with "The Whole Smurf and Nothing But the Smurf" in Cartoon Network and Boomerang airings.
73	11	"How to Smurf a Rainbow"	Story by : John Bradford; Teleplay by : Gerard Baldwin	October 8, 1983	83–6A	6.54
73	11	"Smurfette for a Day"	Story by : David Wise; Teleplay by : Tedd Anasti	October 8, 1983	83–5	6.54
When Mother Nature is too busy on the Rainbow Day, she trusts the Smurfs to create a rainbow. Hefty poses as Smurfette to trick an imp who fell in love with her.
74	12	"Peewit Meets Bigmouth"	Glenn Leopold	October 8, 1983	83–8B	6.87
74	12	"Lumbering Smurfs"	Story by : Lou Vipperman; Teleplay by : Jeff Segal and Alan Burnett	October 8, 1983	83–7	6.87
Peewit accidentally turns a prince is turned into a chicken and he is captured by Bigmouth, so Peewit has to save him. The Smurfs encounter lumberjacks who are cutting down the forest.
75	13	"Handy's Sweetheart"	John Bradford and John Bonaccorsi	October 15, 1983	83–11C	4.86
Handy falls in love with Marina, a mermaid.
76	14	"A Hovel is Not a Home"	Chris Jenkyns	October 15, 1983	83–8C	6.54
76	14	"Speak for Yourself, Farmer Smurf"	Glenn Leopold	October 15, 1983	83–9B	6.54
Gargamel enlists the Great Book of Spells to fulfil his wish for a bigger home. Farmer tries to tell Smurfette that he loves her, indirectly.
77	15	"Forget-Me-Smurfs"	Larry Parr	October 15, 1983	83–11B	7.21
77	15	"The Grumpy Gremlin"	Glenn Leopold	October 15, 1983	83–14C	7.21
An early blooming flower causes all the Smurfs lose their memory, except for Sickly. Peewit chops down a gremlin's tree.
78	16	"Willpower Smurfs"	Sandy Fries	October 22, 1983	83–12B	3.85
78	16	"Clumsy Luck"	Story by : Jim Arnold; Teleplay by : John Bonaccorsi	October 22, 1983	83–12A	3.85
In exchange for Jokey not playing pranks for one year, Vanity agrees to forgo his mirror for one day; ditto for Harmony and his horn, Grouchy and his frowning, Lazy and sleep, and Greedy and excessive eating. Note: This episode was paired with "Baby Smurf is Missing" in Cartoon Network and Boomerang airings. After Clumsy annoys all the other Smurfs, they lock him into his house to keep the village quiet. But during a meteor shower, a meteor crashes Clumsy's house, but unbeknownst to the Smurfs, Clumsy was not there. Note: This episode was paired with "The Smurfstone Quest" in Cartoon Network and Boomerang airings.
79	17	"Baby Smurf is Missing"	Chris Jenkyns	October 22, 1983	83–12E	5.87
79	17	"The Smurfs' Time Capsule"	Story by : Joe Hartnett, Patsy Cameron, and Tedd Anasti; Teleplay by : Tedd Anasti	October 22, 1983	83–12C	5.87
Poachers capture Baby. Note: This episode was paired with "Willpower Smurfs" in Cartoon Network and Boomerang airings. The Smurfs must solve a riddle to defeat the evil Druids.
80	18	"Wedding Bells for Gargamel"	Jeff Segal and Alan Burnett	October 29, 1983	83–14B	4.78
80	18	"To Smurf a Thief"	Patsy Cameron and Tedd Anasti	October 29, 1983	83–12D	4.78
The Smurfs prepare wedding gifts for a princess who is forced to marry Gargamel but, due to a mishap, Poet places a map to the Smurf village in the chest instead of his poem. Homnibus raises a little boy who's believed to be a thief and Homnibus must prove his innocence.
81	19	"Greedy and the Porridge Pot"	Richard H. Fogel, Jr.	October 29, 1983	83–13A	6.45
81	19	"Harmony Steals the Show"	Story by : Harriet Belkin and Norman Belkin; Teleplay by : Patsy Cameron	October 29, 1983	83–6F	6.45
A fairy gives Greedy a magic porridge pot, but when Brainy takes it for himself, the whole village is soon flooded with porridge. Harmony is trapped by a ghost after performing the ghost's symphony as his own.
82	20	"The Golden Smurf Award"	Patsy Cameron	October 29, 1983	83–3E	7.12
Brainy comes up with an award show to decide which Smurf is the most popular while Hogatha disguises as his main prize.
83	21	"The Moor's Baby"	Gerard Baldwin	November 5, 1983	83–16C	5.11
83	21	"Hefty's Heart"	Frances Novier	November 5, 1983	83–9A	5.11
The Smurfs must solve an algebra problem to free the Tooth Fairy and ease the teething pains of both Baby Smurf and a visiting moor's baby. Gargamel infects Hefty with a hate disease. This episode was paired with "Beauty is Only Smurf Deep" in Cartoon Network and Boomerang airings.
84	22	"A Hug for Grouchy"	Story by : LeRoy Parker; Teleplay by : Patsy Cameron	November 5, 1983	83–14D	7.04
84	22	"The Magic Rattle"	Story by : Peyo, Patsy Cameron, and Tedd Anasti; Teleplay by : John Bradford	November 5, 1983	83–16B	7.04
Chlorhydris indirectly removes emotions from the Smurfs and the only way to overcome this by sunset is for Grouchy to hug a fairy. Due to an innocent mistake, Baby's rattle is exchanged with a magic rattle.
85	23	"All Hallows' Eve" "Smurfs Halloween Special"	N/A	November 5, 1983	83–N/A (Note: This episode is labeled in-between #83–6F ("Harmony Steals the Show") and #83–7 ("Lumbering Smurfs").)	7.54
85	23	"The Littlest Witch"	Story by : William Hasley and Gene Ayres; Teleplay by : Gene Ayres and Tedd Anasti	November 5, 1983	83–13B	7.54
Mother Nature turns Lazy red by mistake. Later, Lazy is captured by Gargamel and Hogatha. The Smurfs teach a young witch named Brenda to do good. This episode was paired with "A Bell for Azrael" in Cartoon Network and Boomerang airings.
86	24	"April Smurf's Day"	Tedd Anasti (based on a story by Ron Campbell and Tedd Anasti)	November 12, 1983	83–1A	6.45
86	24	"The Magic Stick"	Jeff Segal and Alan Burnett	November 12, 1983	83–1B	6.45
Gargamel disguises himself as a smurfberry bush to capture the Smurfs. This episode was paired with "Chip Off the Old Smurf" in Cartoon Network and Boomerang airings. Bigmouth is gradually consuming the smurfberry crop. Papa creates a magic stick to deal with him. Just when the magic stick is urgently needed, Papa finds out that it has been switched, thanks to Clumsy. This episode was paired with "The Kaplowey Scroll" in Cartoon Network and Boomerang airings.
87	25	"Baby's First Christmas"	Patsy Cameron and Tedd Anasti	November 12, 1983	83–12F	8.21
87	25	"Beauty is Only Smurf Deep"	Richard H. Fogel, Jr.	November 12, 1983	83–17A	8.21
Chlorhydris gives Mr. Nicholas the kiss of hate, in order to ruin Baby's first Christmas. Periwinkle, the perfection-minded pixie, finds a kindred spirit in Vanity and tries to kill him. This episode was paired with "Hefty's Heart" in Cartoon Network and Boomerang airings.
88	26	"A Wolf in Peewit's Clothing"	Glenn Leopold	November 12, 1983	83–1D	8.30
88	26	"A Bell for Azrael"	Bill Keenan	November 12, 1983	83–6E	8.30
Rattner uses wolf gravy to turn Peewit into a werewolf in order to capture three Smurfs for his spell. This episode was paired with "No Time for Smurfs" in Cartoon Network and Boomerang airings. Brainy ties a bell to Azrael's tail. Gargamel uses magic to make it ring only when it is near a Smurf. This episode was paired with "The Littlest Witch" in Cartoon Network and Boomerang airings.
89	27	"The Chief Record Smurf"	Tedd Anasti	November 19, 1983	83–3C	4.94
89	27	"Smurfing in Sign Language"	John Bates and Patsy Cameron	November 19, 1983	83–14A	4.94
Clumsy gets a photographic memory. Gargamel captures Clumsy and uses a spell to make him give up the formula to an invisibility spell. This episode was paired with "The Magic Earrings" in Cartoon Network and Boomerang airings. Gargamel makes Poet mute, so Papa's friend Laconia helps him. This episode was paired with "A Gift for Papa's Day" in Cartoon Network and Boomerang airings.
90	28	"A Chip Off the Old Smurf"	Haskell Barkin	November 19, 1983	83–8A	6.79
Every Smurf wants Baby to be like them. Meanwhile, Gargamel has a new plan against the Smurfs. This episode was paired with "April Smurf's Day" in Cartoon Network and Boomerang airings.
91	29	"A Gift for Papa's Day"	Sharon Painter and Tedd Anasti	November 19, 1983	83–11A	7.96
After the Smurfs give Papa Smurf a new hat he dislikes for Papa's Day, he tries many ways to get rid of it. This episode was paired with "Smurfing in Sign Language" in Cartoon Network and Boomerang airings.
92	30	"Good Neighbor Smurf"	Marc Scott Zicree and Michael Reaves	November 26, 1983	83–3D	5.03
92	30	"The Smurfstone Quest"	Gordon Bressack	November 26, 1983	83–15A	5.03
Brainy's house is destroyed and he has to stay with another Smurf, but proves himself as the worst roommate. This episode was paired with "Hats Off to Smurfs" in Cartoon Network and Boomerang airings. Papa sends Hefty, Handy, and Lazy on a dangerous mission to find a crystal that will heal his leg. This episode was paired with "Clumsy Luck" in Cartoon Network and Boomerang airings.
93	31	"Hats Off to Smurfs"	Frances Novier	November 26, 1983	83–2A	6.37
93	31	"The Noble Stag"	Richard H. Fogel, Jr.	November 26, 1983	83–10	6.37
Vanity finds Gargamel's magical yellow Smurf hat, that he cannot get unglued from his head. This episode was paired with "Good Neighbor Smurf" in Cartoon Network and Boomerang airings. After being unintentionally taken by to King Gerard's castle, Harmony discovers that the king's cousin has turned him into a stag.
94	32	"Smurfy Acres"	Bill Keenan	November 26, 1983	83–15B	7.29
94	32	"No Time for Smurfs"	Richard H. Fogel, Jr.	November 26, 1983	83–3B	7.29
Gargamel uses the Great Book of Spells to create another village for the Smurfs as a trap. This episode was paired with "All Creatures Great and Smurf" in Cartoon Network and Boomerang airings. Handy, Brainy, Clumsy and Smurfette break Father Time's clock and all time stops. This episode was paired with "Wolf in Peewit's Clothing" in Cartoon Network and Boomerang airings.

=== Season 4 (1984) ===
No. overall	No. in season	Title	Written by	Original release date	Prod. code	U.S. households (in millions)
95	1	"Symbols of Wisdom"	Frances Novier	September 15, 1984	84–2C	5.09
95	1	"Blue Eyes Returns"	Gerald Baldwin	September 15, 1984	84–10D	5.09
Gargamel uses a hair tonic to get a beard to look smarter, but his beard doesn't want to stop growing and now it's all over the forest. Note: This episode was paired with "Heavenly Smurfs" in Cartoon Network and Boomerang airings. Gargamel's rain spell floods the entire forest and Smurfette calls on Blue Eyes, her pegasus friend, to help the Smurfs. Note: This episode was paired with "The Bad Place" in Cartoon Network and Boomerang airings.
96	2	"Secret of the Village Well"	Frances Novier	September 15, 1984	84–2E	6.96
96	2	"Stop and Smurf the Roses"	Patsy Cameron	September 15, 1984	84–4C	6.96
After making a wish, Clumsy refuses to leave the village well. Chlorhydris destroys all the flowers in the world.
97	3	"The Gingerbread Smurfs"	Sandy Fries	September 15, 1984	84–4A	7.22
97	3	"Jokey's Shadow"	Richard H. Fogel, Jr.	September 15, 1984	84–2D	7.22
Brainy and Clumsy make living gingerbread cookies that cause trouble in the village. Jokey's shadow comes to life.
98	4	"Jokey's Funny Bone"	Patsy Cameron	September 22, 1984	84–4D	4.67
98	4	"Tick Tock Smurfs"	Larry Parr	September 22, 1984	84–5A	4.67
After Vanity gets hurt and gets a lot of attention, Jokey fakes being hurt. Brainy creates a schedule that is making the other Smurfs angry.
99	5	"The Master Smurf"	Kevin Hopps	September 22, 1984	84–12B	6.79
99	5	"Tailor's Magic Needle"	Mel Gilden and Patsy Cameron	September 22, 1984	84–8A	6.79
Miner finds a magic crown whose dark past they ignore. Brainy wants to put the crown on his head, but Greedy puts it on himself, becoming Evil with absolute power. He proclaims himself King and establishes a dictatorship in the village, mesmerizing all Smurfs (except Brainy, Clumsy and Smurfette). Brainy and Tailor use Papa's spellbook and create a magic needle to do Tailor's work faster, but Tailor might lose his job because of that needle. Note: This episode was paired with "Monster Smurfs" in Cartoon Network and Boomerang airings.
100	6	"The Traveler"	Tedd Anasti and Mark Seidenberg	September 22, 1984	84–3D	7.22
100	6	"A Pet for Baby Smurf"	Frances Novier	September 22, 1984	84–3C	7.22
A dragon spirit wreaks havoc. Clumsy and Baby find a cute animal and they take him to the village, but the cute animal is Azrael.
101	7	"The Incredible Shrinking Wizard"	Patsy Cameron and Tedd Anasti	September 29, 1984	84–2B	4.84
Due to falling into its own pollution, Gargamel shrinks everytime he does something bad and enlarges everytime he does something good.
102	8	"Breakfast at Greedy's"	Patsy Cameron	September 29, 1984	84–6E	6.45
102	8	"The Secret of Shadow Swamp"	John Bates	September 29, 1984	84–3A	6.45
Greedy makes pancakes that send all Smurfs except for Clumsy, Lazy and Baby up in the air. It is Grouchy's birthday and Grouchy travels to Shadow Swamp to escape the party.
103	9	"The Trojan Smurf"	Story by : Peyo; Teleplay by : Mark Seidenberg	September 29, 1984	84–7D	6.96
103	9	"Smurf the Other Cheek"	Story by : Peyo; Teleplay by : Frances Novier	September 29, 1984	84–7A	6.96
Gargamel hides in a Trojan horse. Ignoring Papa Smurf's lecture on fighting, Hefty gives in temptation to kick a troll, and lives to regret it.
104	10	"A Float Full of Smurfs"	Ray Parker	October 6, 1984	84–4E	5.01
104	10	"Smurfette's Sweet Tooth"	Story by : Patsy Cameron; Teleplay by : John Semper and Cynthia Friedlob	October 6, 1984	84–5E	5.01
Gargamel and Azrael dress as rabbits, hoping to be selected to pull the float for the Smurf Fall Carnival. Note: This episode was paired with "Gargamel's Miss-Fortune" in Cartoon Network and Boomerang airings. After Smurfette eats her entire year's worth of smurfberry candy, she casts a spell to give her the ability to turn everything she touches into smurfberry candy. Note: This episode was paired with "The Man in the Moon" in Cartoon Network and Boomerang airings.
105	11	"Smurf on Wood"	Richard H. Fogel, Jr.	October 6, 1984	84–6B	6.28
Clumsy finds a wishing tree.
106	12	"The Smurfomatic Smurfolator"	Story by : Peyo; Teleplay by : John Bates	October 6, 1984	84–9E	6.71
106	12	"Petrified Smurfs"	Mark Seidenberg	October 6, 1984	84–8D	6.71
Handy makes a large machine that was seen in his dream. Peewit travels to the Quarrel Castle to reverse a spell with which Brainy has turned half of the forest, including the Smurfs and their whole village, into stone.
107	13	"Papa's Worrywarts"	Richard H. Fogel, Jr.	October 13, 1984	84–9A	4.92
107	13	"Lazy's Slumber Party"	Patsy Cameron, John Semper, and Cynthia Friedlob	October 13, 1984	84–8C	4.92
Papa gets infected with warts that make him worry about everything. Lazy has to save the Smurfs from Bigmouth after they play a prank on him while he is sleeping.
108	14	"The Pussywillow Pixies"	Patsy Cameron, Tedd Anasti, and Richard H. Fogel, Jr.	October 13, 1984	84–1B	6.96
The Smurfs journey to help the Pixies from the evil Wartmongers.
109	15	"The Big Nose Dilemma"	Jeff Segal	October 13, 1984	84–9D	7.47
109	15	"The Smurfbox Derby"	Story by : Gerard Baldwin; Teleplay by : Mark Seidenberg	October 13, 1984	84–10A	7.47
Vanity uses a spellbook and gets a shiny new nose which he finds dissatisfying. Handy invents karts for the Smurfs and they do a race to determine which kart is the fastest.
110	16	"A Circus for Baby"	John Semper and Cynthia Friedlob	October 20, 1984	84–4B	4.84
While trying to save Baby from Lord Balthazar, Hefty falls.
111	17	"Babes in Wartland"	Richard H. Fogel, Jr.	October 20, 1984	84–10C	6.62
111	17	"The Smurf-walk Cafe"	Story by : Gerard Baldwin; Teleplay by : Patsy Cameron	October 20, 1984	84–11A	6.62
Baby Smurf ends up at the hollow and gets captured by the Wartmongers. However, the Wartmongers react differently to him, and they make him a jester for their king. The Smurfs learn that it is better to work together.
112	18	"The Smurfiest of Friends"	Patsy Cameron and Tedd Anasti	October 20, 1984	84–12A	7.56
112	18	"Never Smurf Off Til Tomorrow"	John Bonaccorsi	October 20, 1984	84–3B	7.56
When Brainy and Clumsy's friendship dissolves, Brainy runs away and gets kidnapped by an evil imp. Note: This episode was paired with "He Who Smurfs Last" in Cartoon Network and Boomerang airings. Lazy gets hurt while preparing for a hurricane and he, Handy, Smurfette, Brainy, Hefty and Nat are trapped in a volcano that is about to erupt.
113	19	"Bigmouth Smurf"	Mark Seidenberg	October 27, 1984	84–12D	4.16
113	19	"Baby's Enchanted Didey"	Story by : Mike Keyes; Teleplay by : Richard H. Fogel, Jr.	October 27, 1984	84–13A	4.16
Gargamel turns Bigmouth into a giant Smurf. Tailor Smurf makes a golden diaper for Baby Smurf from Gargamel's enchanted dust.
114	20	"The Man in the Moon"	Frances Novier	October 27, 1984	84–1D	5.86
114	20	"Smurfette's Golden Tresses"	Kevin Hopps and John Bates	October 27, 1984	84–6D	5.86
The Man in the Moon feels unappreciated and decides to leave the moon and, in doing so, causes the moon to stop shining. He visits the Smurf village and learns about their annual Full Moon Festival. Note: This episode was paired with "Smurfette's Sweet Tooth" in Cartoon Network and Boomerang airings. Hogatha kidnaps Smurfette so she can use Smurfette's hair in a potion to give her beautiful hair to satisfy her new love. Note: This episode was paired with "The Patchwork Bear" in Cartoon Network and Boomerang airings.
115	21	"The Whole Smurf and Nothing but the Smurf"	Richard H. Fogel, Jr.	October 27, 1984	84–1C	7.56
115	21	"Gargamel's Giant"	Tedd Anasti and Mark Seidenberg	October 27, 1984	84–1A	7.56
Gargamel gives Smurfette a fib formula instead of a truth tonic. Note: This episode was paired with "The Smurf Who Would Be King" in Cartoon Network and Boomerang airings. Toughie (Tuffy) fights Azrael and loses. In his latest plot on the Smurfs, Gargamel works on creating a giant. To create it, he needs a great deal of clay, bad apples, rotten eggs, sour choke cherries, a thunderstorm, and a spell to bring it to life. Due to him being unable to find choke cherries, he substitutes them with Smurfberries. When the giant Dufus is created, he does as Gargamel tells him....until he starts to like the taste of Smurfberry pies. Note: This episode was paired with "The Gargoyle of Quarrel Castle" in Cartoon Network and Boomerang airings.
116	22	"The Patchwork Bear"	John Bonaccorsi	November 10, 1984	84–7C	5.77
116	22	"Hefty and the Wheelsmurfer"	Sandy Fries	November 10, 1984	84–5D	5.77
The Smurfs help a cowardly bear save the Crystal Kingdom and the Emerald Empress from being encased in ice by a vengeful being. Note: This episode was paired with "Smurfette's Golden Tresses" in Cartoon Network and Boomerang airings. Hefty breaks his leg. Handy helps him by making a wheelsmurfer. Note: This episode was paired with "Smurfiplication" in Cartoon Network and Boomerang airings.
117	23	"Hopping Cough Smurfs"	Story by : LeRoy Parker, Felicia Freeman, and Michael Maliani; Teleplay by : Tedd Anasti and Mark Seidenberg	November 10, 1984	84–5B	7.47
117	23	"The Little Orange Horse with the Gold Shoes"	Gerard Baldwin	November 10, 1984	84–9B	7.47
Gargamel gives the Smurfs the hopping cough. Smurfette meets a young pegasus named Blue Eyes that no one besides her and Azrael can see. Blue Eyes loses one of the golden horseshoes given to him by Thor. Gargamel finds the horseshoe.
118	24	"Monster Smurfs"	Story by : Peyo; Teleplay by : Sharon Painter	November 10, 1984	84–6A	8.32
118	24	"The Bad Place"	Story by : Gerard Baldwin; Teleplay by : Mark Seidenberg	November 10, 1984	84–11D	8.32
Brainy uses magic to turn the Smurfs into monsters for one night. Note: This episode was paired with "Tailor's Magic Needle" in Cartoon Network and Boomerang airings. Muddy aliens visit the Smurfs. Note: This episode was paired with "Blue Eyes Returns" in Cartoon Network and Boomerang airings.
119	25	"Smurfing for Ghosts"	Patsy Cameron, Tedd Anasti, and Mark Seidenberg	November 17, 1984	84–13D	5.52
119	25	"The Gargoyle of Quarrel Castle"	Tedd Anasti and Mark Seidenberg	November 17, 1984	84–2A	5.52
Brainy and Clumsy become ghostbusters. Note: This episode was paired with "The Masked Pie Smurfer" in Cartoon Network and Boomerang airings. The Smurfs play with Tharp. Note: This episode was paired with "Gargamel's Giant" in Cartoon Network and Boomerang airings.
120	26	"Smurfiplication"	Gordon Bressack	November 17, 1984	84–1E	7.22
120	26	"Gargamel's Miss-Fortune"	Felicia Freeman and Michael Maliani	November 17, 1984	84–3E	7.22
Gargamel duplicates Brainy, so the Smurfs have to deal with six nerds instead of one. Note: This episode was paired with "Hefty and the Wheelsmurfer" in Cartoon Network and Boomerang airings. After Gargamel tricks a fortune teller to help him capture Smurfette and Dreamy, the fortune teller helps Papa Smurf trick Gargamel in order to rescue them. Note: This episode was paired with "A Float Full of Smurfs" in Cartoon Network and Boomerang airings.

=== Season 5 (1985) ===
No. overall	No. in season	Title	Written by	Original release date	Prod. code	U.S. households (in millions)
121	1	"Stuck on Smurfs"	Richard H. Fogel, Jr.	September 21, 1985	85–3A	5.67
121	1	"Puppy"	Frances Novier	September 21, 1985	85–2A	5.67
All the Smurfs (except the Smurflings) are stuck together. Homnibus gives the Smurfs Puppy that it as a magic locket.
122	2	"Papa's Day Off"	Glen Egbert	September 21, 1985	85–5E	7.99
122	2	"The Smurflings"	Peyo, Richard H. Fogel, Jr., and Mark Seidenberg	September 21, 1985	85–1A	7.99
The Smurfs give Papa a day off. Due to an accident, Nat, Snappy, and Slouchy are reverse aged.
123	3	"He Who Smurfs Last"	Gordon Bressack	September 21, 1985	85–1E	8.16
123	3	"Baby's First Word"	Alan Burnett	September 21, 1985	85–11B	8.16
Chlorhydris is pranked by Jokey and exacts revenge on the Smurfs. Note: This episode was paired with "The Smurfiest of Friends" in Cartoon Network and Boomerang airings. Baby is going to say his first word, but he gets kidnapped by Gargamel.
124	4	"The Masked Pie Smurfer"	Patsy Cameron and Tedd Anasti	September 28, 1985	85–2C	6.10
124	4	"Sassette"	Patsy Cameron and Tedd Anasti	September 28, 1985	85–1B	6.10
A masked Smurf throws pies on the other Smurfs. Note: This episode was paired with "Smurfing for Ghosts" in Cartoon Network and Boomerang airings. The Smurflings creates Sassette as a sister for Smurfette, but Papa punishes them. However, Papa discovers that Sassette is going to explode and kill everyone, thanks to Gargamel. So he creates an antidote to prevent Sassette from exploding, which proved to be successful, and she's officially adopted as part of the village and as Smurfette's sister respectively.
125	5	"Papa's Puppy Prescription"	Tom Walla	September 28, 1985	85–5A	7.47
125	5	"Poet's Writers' Block"	Therese Naugle	September 28, 1985	85–6D	7.47
The Smurflings accidentally turn Papa's nose into a dog's nose. Poet tries to lift a curse from a princess, but fails.
126	6	"Smurf a Mile in My Shoes"	Patsy Cameron and Tedd Anasti	September 28, 1985	85–2B	7.13
The Smurfs help a cursed imp.
127	7	"Dreamy's Pen Pals"	Mark Seidenberg	October 5, 1985	85–2E	5.41
127	7	"Papa's Flying Bed"	Therese Naugle	October 5, 1985	85–1D	5.41
Dreamy visits the Shmoofs again. Whatever is dreamed by the person sleeping on Papa's bed, the bed flies to it.
128	8	"Mud Wrestling Smurfs"	Kevin Hopps	October 5, 1985	85–1C	6.53
128	8	"The Sand Witch"	John Bradford	October 5, 1985	85–2D	6.53
The Wartmongers drain the river to make mud. A baby monster takes Baby, and Papa has to save him.
129	9	"Kow-Tow, We Won't Bow"	John Bates, Patsy Cameron, and Tedd Anasti	October 5, 1985	85–3B	6.70
The Wartmongers capture the Smurflings, so Smurfette has to saves them.
130	10	"Bigmouth's Friend"	Gerard Baldwin	October 12, 1985	85–4D	4.47
130	10	"Wild and Wooly"	Burt Wetanson	October 12, 1985	85–3C	4.47
Clockwork Smurf befriends Bigmouth, while Lord Balthazar plans to destroy Clockwork. Woolly sheares sheep once a year. Papa asks the Smurflings to tag along, but Gargamel influences their help.
131	11	"The Dark-Ness Monster"	Patsy Cameron and Jeff Hall	October 12, 1985	85–4B	5.84
Brainy loses his glasses.
132	12	"The Grouchiest Game in Town"	Kevin Hopps	October 12, 1985	85–3D	6.79
132	12	"Queen Smurfette"	John Bradford	October 12, 1985	85–4A	6.79
Hefty tilts the playing field in Grouchy's favor, but Grouchy still loses. Later, Grouchy must win against the Game Master. The Smurfs make Smurfette as their queen for her birthday.
133	13	"Marco Smurf and the Pepper Pirates"	Burt Wetanson	October 19, 1985	85–4B	4.55
The Smurfs rescue Marco.
134	14	"Educating Bigmouth"	Bill Matheny	October 19, 1985	85–3E	5.58
134	14	"Brainy Smurf, Friend to All the Animals"	Patsy Cameron	October 19, 1985	85–3C	5.58
Big Nose finds Bigmouth disgusting and leaves him, so the Smurfs has to help him. Brainy wants to be like Nat.
135	15	"The Comet is Coming"	John Bates, Mark Seidenberg, and Tedd Anasti	October 19, 1985	85–6B	7.30
A message from Papa is torn and the Smurfs think that the world is ending.
136	16	"Happy Unhappiness Day to You"	Ray Parker	October 26, 1985	85–4E	5.93
136	16	"The Great Slime Crop Failure"	Ray Parker and Tedd Anasti	October 26, 1985	85–4C	5.93
Once a year, the Smurfs are supposed to be unhappy. The Wartmongers capture Farmer and the Smurflings in order to save their slime crop.
137	17	"Papa's Family Album"	Tedd Anasti	October 26, 1985	85–9B	7.04
Papa shows the Smurflings his family album of how he and the Smurfs when they were younger.
138	18	"Love Those Smurfs"	Bill Matheny	October 26, 1985	85–7A	7.99
138	18	"Mutiny on the Smurf"	John Bradford	October 26, 1985	85–5F	7.99
Chlorhydris makes each one of the Smurfs only love themselves except for Vanity, Brainy, and Snappy. A king overhears the Smurflings' music and wants them to sing a song for him, but he accidentally captures Brainy's orchestra.
139	19	"Things That Go Smurf in the Night"	Gordon Bressack	November 2, 1985	85–6E	5.50
139	19	"Alarming Smurfs"	Mark Seidenberg	November 2, 1985	85–6C	5.50
Gargamel sleepwalks into the Smurf village while Snappy has to find his teddy bear. The Smurflings run away because nobody wants to play with them. So they get their stuff in order to keep their memories, but the Smurfs think that there is a thief among them.
140	20	"Smurfette's Rose"	Kathleen Naugle and Kevin Hopps	November 2, 1985	85–7C	6.44
140	20	"The Mr. Smurf Contest"	N/A	November 2, 1985	85–8A	6.44
Smurfette angrily scolds Sassette for not watering her flowers, leaving Sassette heartbroken. Later, Smurfette asks Mother Nature for a blue rose and gives her a spell, but it backfires after the spell turns Smurfette white, leaving her in tears. A contest is held to choose Smurfette's escort for a ball, and Gargamel sneak in as a disguised Smurf, while Papa plans something secretly: being Sassette's escorter for the ball.
141	21	"Have You Smurfed Your Pet Today?"	Burt Wetanson	November 2, 1985	85–11A	8.07
141	21	"Unsound Smurfs"	Richard H. Fogel, Jr.	November 2, 1985	85–10A	8.07
The Smurflings neglect Puppy due to Handy's new toy. Brainy makes a mess in the village when he creates a sound barrier. The Smurflings then go to save the village.
142	22	"All Work and No Smurf"	Chris Otsuki and Kevin Hopps	November 9, 1985	85–11D	5.24
142	22	"They're Smurfing Our Song"	Therese Naugle	November 9, 1985	85–8D	5.24
The Smurfs are requested to work on their day off and they turn into tools. Note: This episode was paired with "Gargamel's Time Trip" in Cartoon Network and Boomerang airings. Sassette borrows Woody's magic pipe to make Gargamel love others, but it backfires as things do not turn out as intended. Note: This episode was paired with "Brainy's Smarty Party" in Cartoon Network and Boomerang airings.
143	23	"Gargamel's Time Trip"	Tedd Anasti	November 9, 1985	85–11E	5.84
Gargamel travels back in time to change the past, while Sassette sneaks out of the village to make Gargamel a good wizard. Note: This episode was paired with "All Work and No Smurf" in Cartoon Network and Boomerang airings.
144	24	"Brainy's Smarty Party"	Glen R. Egbert and Patsy Cameron	November 9, 1985	85–6A	7.22
Brainy throws a great party and invites everyone except the Smurflings. Note: This episode was paired with "They're Smurfing Our Song" in Cartoon Network and Boomerang airings.

=== Season 6 (1986) ===
No. overall	No. in season	Title	Written by	Original release date	Prod. code	U.S. households (in millions)
145	1	"Smurfquest" (Act 1–4)	Alan Burnett, Richard Fogel, Mark Seidenberg, Glenn Leopold, and Peyo	September 13, 1986	86–1	4.63
146	2	"Smurfquest" (Act 1–4)	Alan Burnett, Richard Fogel, Mark Seidenberg, Glenn Leopold, and Peyo	September 13, 1986	86–1	5.68
Grandpa Smurf returns to the village from a 500-year voyage around the world to restore the power of the Long Life Force Stone. Papa Smurf and a few other Smurfs help Grandpa Smurf find the purest sources of the four primal elements from around the world (Earth, air, water and fire) while the remaining Smurfs stay behind to search for the Long Life Force Stone.
147	3	"Gargamel's New Job"	John Loy and Alan Burnett	September 13, 1986	86–7B	6.47
Prince Theodore hires Gargamel as his new court magician.
148	4	"Grouchy Makes a Splash"	Burt Wetanson	September 20, 1986	86–2A	4.28
The Smurfs try to teach Grouchy to swim. Note: This episode was paired with "Farmer's Genii" in Cartoon Network and Boomerang airings.
149	5	"No Smurf is an Island"	John Bonaccorsi	September 20, 1986	86–N/A	4.72
149	5	"Don Smurfo"	Sean Catherine Derek	September 20, 1986	86–N/A	4.72
Handy builds a smurfmarine to live with Marina after an argument with Hefty. Note: This episode was paired with "The Answer Smurf" in Cartoon Network and Boomerang airings. Jokey disguises himself as Don Smurfo (a story book character) to charm Smurfette. Note: This episode was paired with "Gargamel's Dummy" in Cartoon Network and Boomerang airings.
150	6	"The Prince and the Hopper"	Story by : Alan Burnett; Teleplay by : John Loy	September 20, 1986	86–3B	5.42
Prince Theodore is turned into a frog and Smurfette, Sassette, and Poet help him to break the spell.
151	7	"Smurfette's Gift"	Therese Naugle	September 27, 1986	86–N/A	4.89
151	7	"The Most Popular Smurf"	Sean Catherine Derek	September 27, 1986	86–N/A	4.89
The Smurfs hide Smurfette's birthday presents before her birthday. When Smurfette goes snooping, she is captured by an imp. After Jokey's latest prank, Scruple enchants Jokey's exploding boxes into real surprise... only for Papa to reverse the spell.
152	8	"A Loss of Smurf"	Story by : James Barmeier and Tedd Anasti; Teleplay by : James Barmeier	September 27, 1986	86–4B	5.42
Vanity is tricked by an elf and turns into a Wartmonger.
153	9	"The Last Whippoorwill"	Richard Fogel and Sean Catherine Derek	September 27, 1986	86–N/A	5.42
153	9	"The Color Smurfy"	Therese Naugle	September 27, 1986	86–N/A	5.42
Insects invade the village. Note: This episode was paired with "Baby's New Toy" in Cartoon Network and Boomerang airings. The Smurflings break the color wheel, making every colours gone except for the Smurfy blue. Note: This episode was paired with "Head Over Hogatha" in Cartoon Network and Boomerang airings.
154	10	"Lazy's Nightmare"	Story by : Richard Fogel and Mark Seidenberg; Teleplay by : Bill Matheny	October 4, 1986	86–9B	4.02
The Smurfs are trapped in Lazy's nightmare.
155	11	"All the Smurf's a Stage"	Kevin Hopps and Mark Seidenberg	October 4, 1986	86–4A	3.93
155	11	"Smurfs on Wheels"	Gordon Bressack	October 4, 1986	86–N/A	3.93
Timid pretends to be Poet, Tailor, Painter, Handy, Brainy and Papa. The Smurfs fells sad that they didn't go on a hike with Papa, Grandpa, and Nat, so Handy makes a smurfwagon to follow them.
156	12	"The Littlest Viking"	Glenn Leopold	October 4, 1986	86–12B	5.07
Peewit and the Smurfs go to an island where the vikings think that Peewit is an actual Viking.
157	13	"Baby's New Toy"	Bill Matheny	October 11, 1986	86–N/A	4.20
157	13	"Bringing Up Bigfeet"	Gordon Bressack	October 11, 1986	86–N/A	4.20
In order to make Baby happy, the Smurfs visit the Toymaker. Note: This episode was paired with "The Last Whippoorwill" in Cartoon Network and Boomerang airings. The Smurflings babysit Bigmouth's nephew.
158	14	"Scarlet Croaker"	Richard Fogel and Kevin Hopps	October 11, 1986	86–11B	4.89
The Scarlet Croaker helps the Smurfs escape the Wartmongers.
159	15	"Calling Doctor Smurf"	Story by : Alan Burnett and John Bates; Teleplay by : John Bates	October 11, 1986	86–5A	5.59
159	15	"Can't Smurf the Music"	Therese Naugle	October 11, 1986	86–N/A	5.59
Dabbler keeps switching to another task without finishing the previous task. Chlorhydris removes all music from the world.
160	16	"The Royal Drum"	John Bonaccorsi	October 18, 1986	86–N/A	4.72
Other than Nat and Sassette, the Smurfs do not believe Grandpa's story about giraffes, zebras and lions.
161	17	"It's a Puppy's Life"	Story by : Mark Seidenberg and Glenn Leopold; Teleplay by : J.C. Murray	October 18, 1986	86–N/A	5.51
161	17	"Sweepy Smurf"	Story by : John Bradford and Glenn Leopold; Teleplay by : Kevin Hopps	October 18, 1986	86–N/A	5.51
Gargamel and Puppy exchange bodies. In order to make Sweepy popular, the Smurflings make a superstition.
162	18	"Journey to the Center of the Smurf"	Bill Matheny and Kevin Hopps	October 18, 1986	86–N/A	6.03
Winter is early and the Smurfs run out of firewood. Note: This episode was paired with "Jokey's Cloak" in Cartoon Network and Boomerang airings.
163	19	"The Tallest Smurf"	John Loy	October 25, 1986	86–3A	4.72
163	19	"Essence of Brainy"	Burt Wetanson	October 25, 1986	86–9A	4.72
Slouchy wishes to be tall, due to being mocked by his fellow Smurflings. Note: This episode was paired with "Sassette's Tooth" in Cartoon Network and Boomerang airings. Scruple removes Brainy's essence. Note: This episode was paired with "Bookworm Smurf" in Cartoon Network and Boomerang airings.
164	20	"Dr. Evil & Mr. Nice"	Kevin Hopps	October 25, 1986	86–8A	5.42
164	20	"The Root of Evil"	Story by : Kevin Hopps; Teleplay by : John Bonaccorsi	October 25, 1986	86–7A	5.42
Scruple makes a potion to make Gargamel good, but something is wrong with the potion, and this makes Gargamel alternates between being good and evil. Chlorhydris uses an evil root to make everyone evil except Baby.
165	21	"Tattle-Tail Smurfs"	Story by : Mark Seidenberg and Gordon Bressack; Teleplay by : Gordon Bressack	October 25, 1986	86–N/A	6.21
165	21	"Greedy Goes on Strike"	Burt Wetanson	October 25, 1986	86–6B	6.21
Brainy uses a spell that makes the Smurflings' tails longer every time they tattle. Note: This episode was paired with "Locomotive Smurfs" in Cartoon Network and Boomerang airings. Nobody appreciates Greedy so he stops cooking, but he gets captured by the gnomes.
166	22	"Crying Smurfs"	Story by : Mark Seidenberg; Teleplay by : John Bonaccorsi	November 1, 1986	86–N/A	4.46
166	22	"Future Smurfed"	Glenn Leopold and Sharon Painter	November 1, 1986	86–12A	4.46
Papa's enhancement potion accidentally drips on an onion and this makes all the Smurfs cry. Lord Balthazar captures Father Time in order to control time, but he accidentally makes a time crack, bringing a little dinosaur to the present.
167	23	"Gargamel's Dummy"	Bill Matheny	November 1, 1986	86–N/A	5.33
167	23	"Smurf on the Run"	Alan Burnett and Bill Matheny	November 1, 1986	86–N/A	5.33
Gargamel makes Jokey's puppet come to life. Note: This episode was paired with "Don Smurfo" in Cartoon Network and Boomerang airings. The Smurfs prepare for Sassette's birthday. During the preparations, Sassette argue with Hefty and the Smurflings to think that Gargamel should stop being an evil wizard, but Gargamel chases Sassette. Later, Sassette and Gargamel have to team up in order restore the balance of truth. Note: This episode was paired with "Bad Luck Smurfs" in Cartoon Network and Boomerang airings.
168	24	"A Myna Problem"	Sharon Painter and Richard Fogel	November 1, 1986	86–N/A	6.47
168	24	"The Horn of Plenty"	Story by : Glenn Leopold; Teleplay by : John Bonaccorsi	November 1, 1986	86–11A	6.47
Clumsy brings a myna to the village, but the myna overhears Scruple's spell and the myna turns the Smurfs into ducks. Mother Nature accidentally destroys all food. Note: This episode was paired with "Heart of Gold" in Cartoon Network and Boomerang airings.
169	25	"I Smurf to the Trees"	Burt Wetanson	November 8, 1986	86–N/A	4.72
169	25	"Clumsy's Cloud"	Gordon Bressack, Ernest Contreras, and Mark Seidenberg	November 8, 1986	86–N/A	4.72
With Gargamel's magic, the trees uproot themselves, leaving the Smurf village fully exposed. Most of the Smurfs are captured. A magic cloud above Clumsy gives misfortune to the Smurfs.
170	26	"Bookworm Smurf"	Therese Naugle	November 8, 1986	86–N/A	5.68
170	26	"Farmer's Genii"	Story by : Richard Fogel; Teleplay by : Bill Matheny	November 8, 1986	86–N/A	5.68
Brainy teaches Sassette to read, but fails. Later, Sassette accidentally makes all books disappear. Note: This episode was paired with "Essence of Brainy" in Cartoon Network and Boomerang airings. Farmer finds a genie in his crops. Note: This episode was paired with "Grouchy Makes a Splash" in Cartoon Network and Boomerang airings.
171	27	"Master Scruple"	Sean Catherine Derek	November 8, 1986	N/A	6.64
171	27	"Scruple's Sweetheart"	Story by : John Bates and Kevin Hopps; Teleplay by : John Bates and Burt Wetanson	November 8, 1986	86–10A	6.64
Scruple, and later Gargamel, become Gordy's master. Scruple brings Brenda to the Wizard's Ball to have a chance to take her wand.
172	28	"The World According to Smurflings"	John Loy and Vin Morreale, Jr.	November 15, 1986	86–N/A	5.16
172	28	"The Enchanted Quill"	Story by : Kevin Hopps, Richard Fogel, and Alan Burnett; Teleplay by : Kevin Hopps and Burt Wetanson	November 15, 1986	86–N/A	5.16
Mother Nature hurts her back and asks Nat to use her wand. However, his fellow Smurflings messes around with the wand. Note: This episode was paired with "Reckless Smurfs" in Cartoon Network and Boomerang airings. The Smurflings undergo a survival test against their rival Scruple.
173	29	"The Most Unsmurfy Game"	Kevin Hopps	November 15, 1986	86–13A	6.03
173	29	"Put Upon Puppy"	Sharon Painter	November 15, 1986	86–N/A	6.03
Brainy and the Smurflings go on a nature hike but are pursued by the Wartmongers. The Smurflings train Puppy about not burying everything in the village.
174	30	"Heart of Gold"	Kevin Hopps and Mark Seidenberg	November 15, 1986	86–N/A	6.99
174	30	"The Village Vandal"	Sharon Painter and Glenn Leopold	November 15, 1986	86–N/A	6.99
Scruple gives Clockwork Smurf a stone heart after his heart of gold falls out. Note: This episode was paired with "The Horn of Plenty" in Cartoon Network and Boomerang airings. Gargamel makes a termite super hungry that causes a mess in the village. Note: This episode was paired with "Snappy's Way" in Cartoon Network and Boomerang airings.
175	31	"The Gallant Smurf"	Kevin Hopps and Mark Seidenberg	November 22, 1986	86–N/A	4.89
175	31	"Sassette's Tooth"	Kevin Hopps and Mark Seidenberg	November 22, 1986	86–N/A	4.89
Hogatha plans to capture Grandpa. Note: This episode was paired with "Handy's Window-Vision" in Cartoon Network and Boomerang airings. The Tooth Fairy visits Sassette, but she is captured by Gargamel. Note: This episode was paired with "The Tallest Smurf" in Cartoon Network and Boomerang airings.
176	32	"Snappy's Way"	John Loy	November 22, 1986	86–N/A	5.24
176	32	"Fire-Fighting Smurfs"	Story by : John Bonaccorsi and Alan Burnett; Teleplay by : John Bonaccorsi	November 22, 1986	86–5B	5.24
A troll gives Snappy control over the adult Smurfs.Note: This episode was paired with "The Village Vandal" in Cartoon Network and Boomerang airings. Snappy unintentionally causes a forest fire.
177	33	"Handy's Window Vision"	Gordon Bressack	November 22, 1986	86–N/A	6.03
177	33	"Papa Smurf, Papa Smurf"	Story by : Alan Burnett; Teleplay by : Richard Merwin	November 22, 1986	86–13B	6.03
The Smurfs are introduced to television. Note: This episode was paired with "The Gallant Smurf" in Cartoon Network and Boomerang airings. Both Papa and Gargamel are duplicated.
178	34	"Jokey's Cloak"	Kevin Hopps	November 29, 1986	N/A	4.28
178	34	"Papa's Last Spell"	Bill Matheny	November 29, 1986	N/A	4.28
Jokey finds an invisibility cloak. Note: This episode was paired with "Journey to the Center of the Smurf" in Cartoon Network and Boomerang airings. Gargamel removes Papa's magic touch. Note: This episode was paired with "Smurfette's Flower" in Cartoon Network and Boomerang airings.
179	35	"Lure of the Orb"	John Loy and Alan Burnett	November 29, 1986	86–10B	5.07
179	35	"Smurfette's Flower"	Sharon Painter and Glenn Leopold	November 29, 1986	86–N/A	5.07
Alura gives Poet a magic orb to inspire him. Smurfette meets Petaluma, a talking flower that stars using Smurfette's kindness. Note: This episode was paired with "Papa's Last Spell" in Cartoon Network and Boomerang airings.
180	36	"Reckless Smurfs"	Charles M. Howell, IV	November 29, 1986	86–N/A	5.51
180	36	"Head Over Hogatha"	Ernest Contreras	November 29, 1986	86–N/A	5.51
Gargamel makes the Smurfs reckless except Greedy, Snappy and Brainy. Note: This episode was paired with "The World According to Smurflings" in Cartoon Network and Boomerang airings. Cupid's arrow hits Hogatha and she falls in love with Gargamel. Note: This episode was paired with "The Color Smurfy" in Cartoon Network and Boomerang airings.

=== Season 7 (1987) ===
8A4500

No. overall	No. in season	Title	Written by	Original release date	Prod. code	Viewers (millions)
181	1	"Smurf on the Wild Side" (Act 1–2)	Act 1: Story by : Alan Burnett and John Bonaccorsi; Teleplay by : John Bonaccorsi	September 19, 1987	87–2B	5.74
182	2	"Smurf on the Wild Side" (Act 1–2)	Act 2: John Bonaccorsi, Alan Burnett, and Sean Catherine Derek	September 19, 1987	87–2B	7.50
The Smurfs meet Wild for the first time.
183	3	"The Smurflings' Unsmurfy Friend"	Marie Quick and Glenn Leopold	September 19, 1987	87–5E	8.17
183	3	"The Smurfstalker"	Story by : Bill Matheny and Ernie Contreras; Teleplay by : Ernie Contreras	September 19, 1987	87–5A	8.17
The Smurflings befriends a wood sprite. The Smurfs are captured by the Stalker, so Grandpa has to save them.
184	4	"Poltersmurf"	Morgan Flynn Averill	September 26, 1987	87–8A	5.44
184	4	"Baby's Marvelous Toy"	Richard Fogel and Bill Matheny	September 26, 1987	87–2D	5.44
Jokey makes Brainy think that his house is haunted by poltersmurfs. Baby receives a toy that transforms and uses it to sneak out in the forest. Note: This episode was paired with "All the News That's Fit to Smurf" in Cartoon Network and Boomerang airings.
185	5	"Sleepless Smurfs"	Bill Matheny	September 26, 1987	87–5C	7.16
185	5	"Cut-Up Smurfs"	Reed Robbins	September 26, 1987	87–5D	7.16
Morpheo and Gargamel cooperate to capture Smurfs. Sassette's paper dolls come to life thanks to a magic paper she found.
186	6	"Gargamel's Sweetheart"	Ernie Contreras	September 26, 1987	87–10B	7.80
Tailor thinks that he's going to lose his job due to Handy's new invention. Meanwhile, Gargamel falls in love with Evelyn.
187	7	"Wild About Smurfette"	Ken Koonce and David Weimers	October 3, 1987	87–9A	5.37
187	7	"Sing a Song of Smurflings"	Story by : Paul Dini and Charles M. Howell, IV; Teleplay by : Paul Dini	October 3, 1987	87–8E	5.37
Smurfette spends a lot of time with Wild and Brainy, Clumsy, Painter, and Handy become jealous. The Smurflings gets criticized for their music, so they go to a place where Beastie likes their music and follows them back to the village.
188	8	"Smurfing for Gold"	Story by : Mary Beal and Alan Burnett; Teleplay by : Mary Beal	October 3, 1987	87–4C	6.91
188	8	"Jokey's Joke Book"	Reed Robbins	October 3, 1987	87–3D	6.91
The Smurfs dig for gold in exchange for Clumsy's freedom, but after they have no more gold, Jokey creates fake gold by painting stones. The Smurfs refuse to open Jokey's joke boxes, so he switches to other jokes by his Big Book of Laughs, which makes the Smurfs angry, so they punish him by destroying his book, but after the book is destroyed, Jokey leaves the village. Papa Smurf and other Smurfs go looking for him, but when they are captured by Gargamel, Jokey manages to saves them.
189	9	"Poet's Storybook"	Reed Robbins	October 3, 1987	87–6C	7.48
189	9	"The Fastest Wizard in the World"	John Bonaccorsi	October 3, 1987	87–8C	7.48
Everything that Poet writes in a blank book becomes real. Gargamel uses multiple methods to be faster than the Smurfs, but fails because of Wild being faster than him.
190	10	"Dancing Bear"	Ernie Contreras	October 10, 1987	87–10E	5.22
190	10	"Gargamel's Last Will"	Reed Robbins and Bill Matheny	October 10, 1987	87–9C	5.22
A circus owner captures Wild and the Smurflings. Scruple makes Gargamel think that he is becoming a dog.
191	11	"Sassette's Bewitching Friendship"	Bill Matheny, Sean Catherine Derek, and Therese Naugle	October 10, 1987	87–13E	6.72
191	11	"Azrael's Brain"	Fred Kron	October 10, 1987	87–2C	6.72
Sassette befriends a witch Melina who fumbles. Azrael becomes very smart for 24 hours. Note: This episode was paired with "Crooner Smurf" in Cartoon Network and Boomerang airings.
192	12	"Castaway Smurfs"	Allan Cole, Chris Bunch, and Morgan Flynn Averill	October 10, 1987	87–13D	7.21
192	12	"Legendary Smurfs"	Mark McClellan and Glenn Leopold	October 10, 1987	87–9D	7.21
Some Smurfs are enjoying paradise on an island while Dreamy spots danger in there. Two wizards are looking for the Smurfs.
193	13	"Smurfing the Unicorns"	Sean Catherine Derek and Terrie Collins	October 17, 1987	87–10C	5.24
193	13	"Vanity's Closest Friend"	Therese Naugle and Bill Matheny	October 17, 1987	87–11C	5.24
The Smurfs bring a unicorn from a distant forest to save Puppy. Vanity befriends Winkie, but he laments of how his new friend is stuck to him.
194	14	"Peewit's Unscrupulous Adventure"	Story by : Alan Burnett, Sean Catherine Derek, and John Bonaccorsi; Teleplay by : John Bonaccorsi	October 17, 1987	87–11B	6.59
The King invites Papa and the Smurfs to a royal party. Scruple sneaks in to get Peewit's job. Peewit gets fired because he suspect some people who are trying to steals the gold of the castle.
195	15	"Nobody Smurf"	Evelyn A-R Gabai	October 17, 1987	87–11A	7.11
Clumsy wants his friend Nobody to find an activity for him, but an evil goblin turns the Smurfs into goblins like himself and Nobody saves them.
196	16	"Scruple and the Great Book of Spells"	Story by : Glenn Leopold; Teleplay by : Reed Robbins	October 24, 1987	87–1C	5.15
196	16	"Bouncing Smurf"	Story by : Alan Burnett, Ken Koonce, and David Weimers; Teleplay by : Ernie Contreras	October 24, 1987	87–10A	5.15
Farmer's crops are ruined, thanks to Scruple. Clumsy becomes completely rubberized.
197	17	"Clockwork Smurfette"	Story by : Glenn Leopold; Teleplay by : Sean Catherine Derek and John Bonaccorsi	October 24, 1987	87–7B	6.51
197	17	"I Was a Brainy Weresmurf"	Evelyn A-R Gabai	October 24, 1987	87–13B	6.51
Handy creates Clockwork Smurfette for Clockwork Smurf, but Clockwork Smurfette falls in love with Handy rather than Clockwork. Due to an accident, Brainy turns into a weresmurf.
198	18	"The Answer Smurf"	Bill Matheny	October 24, 1987	86–N/A	7.23
198	18	"Vanity's Wild Adventure"	Story by : Ernie Contreras; Teleplay by : Evelyn A-R Gabai and Glenn Leopold	October 24, 1987	86–N/A	7.23
Brainy casts a spell that makes all the Smurfs come to him for the answers to everything except Slouchy. Note: This episode was paired with "No Smurf Is an Island" in Cartoon Network and Boomerang airings. Vanity is forced to stay in the forest with Wild that night, and he isn't very happy with that.
199	19	"Soothsayer Smurfette"	Story by : Sean Catherine Derek and Frances Novier; Teleplay by : Frances Novier	October 31, 1987	87–8B	5.35
199	19	"Crooner Smurf"	Hendrik VanLeuven	October 31, 1987	87–2A	5.35
Smurfette is unsatisfied with the new dress made by Tailor, so she buys an enchanted Gypsy dress from Gargamel that can tell the future. Papa gives Harmony an amulet that greatly improves his singing, but Hogatha captures him. Note: This episode was paired with "Azrael's Brain" in Cartoon Network and Boomerang airings.
200	20	"Papa for a Day"	Reed Robbins	October 31, 1987	87–12A	6.69
200	20	"Flighty's Plight"	Ernie Contreras	October 31, 1987	87–4E	6.69
The Smurfs take turns being Papa. Brainy teaches Flighty about making decisions. However, Lord Balthazar captures Sassette, Brainy, and Hefty. So Flighty has to save them. Note: This episode was paired with "Hefty's Rival" in Cartoon Network and Boomerang airings.
201	21	"To Coin a Smurf"	Story by : Charles M. Howell, IV; Teleplay by : Frances Novier	October 31, 1987	87–9B	7.38
201	21	"Smurfette Unmade"	Story by : Alan Burnett and Bill Matheny; Teleplay by : Bill Matheny and Reed Robbins	October 31, 1987	87–1B	7.38
Gargamel turns Sassette, Grandpa, and Brainy into gold coins. Gargamel makes Smurfette evil again.
202	22	"Foul Feather Fiend"	Reed Robbins	November 7, 1987	87–12E	5.35
202	22	"Sassette's Hive"	Reed Robbins	November 7, 1987	87–6B	5.35
Gargamel turns himself into a bird to infiltrate the Smurf village, but the Smurflings think that he is a mother of a bird. Grandpa and the Smurflings visit the bees in a faraway land, but the evil wasps attacks them. Sassette leads a hive on an operation to save Grandpa, Nat, Slouchy, and the captured bees.
203	23	"Little Big Smurf"	Hendrik VanLeuven	November 7, 1987	87–6E	6.74
203	23	"Locomotive Smurfs"	Bill Matheny and Mark Seidenberg	November 7, 1987	87–4A	6.74
Snappy enlarges himself and becomes bigger. Handy makes a train. Note: This episode was paired with "Tattle-Tail Smurfs" in Cartoon Network and Boomerang airings.
204	24	"A Long Tale for Grandpa"	Story by : Glenn Leopold and Ernie Contreras; Teleplay by : Ernie Contreras	November 7, 1987	87–5B	7.47
204	24	"Where the Wild Smurfs Are"	Story by : Bill Matheny and Evelyn A-R Gabai; Teleplay by : Evelyn A-R Gabai	November 7, 1987	87–8D	7.47
Insects attacks the village, so Grandpa uses his magic balloon and travels to Thunder Island with some of the Smurfs to find the only thunder tree in the world. But the population of that island isn't very happy with that. Hogatha captures squirrels for a special hair formula.
205	25	"The Magic Sack of Mr. Nicholas"	Tom Spath and Alan Burnett	November 14, 1987	87–12B	5.48
205	25	"Swapping Smurfs"	Sean Catherine Derek	November 14, 1987	87–3B	5.48
Chlorhydris steals Mr. Nicholas's magic sack to bring sadness in the world. Grouchy gets a little of Christmas spirit when he must rescue the sack after Scruple wants it for himself. Lazy finds a swapping well than can turn old stuff with better stuff, but a wizard inside the well puts the Smurfs under his spell except for Lazy, Sassette, and Papa.
206	26	"Predictable Smurfs"	Jeff O'Hare and Glenn Leopold	November 14, 1987	87–6A	6.87
206	26	"Hefty's Rival"	Bill Matheny	November 14, 1987	87–3C	6.87
Gargamel sets a time trap for ruining the regatta, but the regatta is delayed by Clumsy. Hefty gets jealous of how Wild becomes a greater athlete than him. Note: This episode was paired with "Flighty's Plight" in Cartoon Network and Boomerang airings.
207	27	"Snappy's Puppet"	Frances Novier	November 14, 1987	87–13A	7.65
207	27	"Prince Smurf"	Story by : David Geffner and Reed Robbins; Teleplay by : David Geffner	November 14, 1987	87–11E	7.65
Snappy makes his puppet come to life. Hefty is forced to marry a princess after he rescues her.
208	28	"Return to Don Smurfo"	Sean Catherine Derek	November 21, 1987	87–6D	5.51
One of Papa Smurf's spells spill onto a Don Smurfo storybook, bringing him to life.
209	29	"Skyscraper Smurfs"	Sean Catherine Derek	November 21, 1987	87–1D	6.85
209	29	"Bad Luck Smurfs"	Mark McClellan and Frances Novier	November 21, 1987	87–7C	6.85
Handy and Architect Smurf build a smurfominium in a tree. All of the Smurfs move in and problems quickly grow. Architech fells guilty of what has he done, and they return to the village. Note: This episode was paired with "Poet the Know-It-All" in Cartoon Network and Boomerang airings. Gargamel captures Lady Luck and uses the wheel of chance to give the Smurfs bad luck. Note: This episode was paired with "Smurf on the Run" in Cartoon Network and Boomerang airings.
210	30	"Smurfing Out of Time"	Story by : Sean Catherine Derek and Bill Matheny; Teleplay by : Reed Robbins	November 21, 1987	87–10D	7.65
210	30	"A Hole in Smurf"	Story by : John Bonaccorsi and Tom Spath; Teleplay by : Tom Spath	November 21, 1987	87–7A	7.65
The Smurflings accidentally pull the plug out of the River of Time, rapidly speeding up time. The Smurfs invent golfing and forget about repairing the bridge.
211	31	"Smurf Pet"	Story by : Glenn Leopold and Ernie Contreras; Teleplay by : Ernie Contreras	November 28, 1987	87–13B	5.38
211	31	"Timber Smurf"	Sean Catherine Derek and Richard Fogel	November 28, 1987	87–1A	5.38
The Smurflings sneak a Nebbit into the village for a pet, but after troubles involving Greedy and Painter, they change their mind. Later, Scruple steals the Nebbit to try to win a science fair, but the Smurflings saves the Nebbit. The Smurfs visit Timber after their bridge is destroyed. Note: This episode was paired with "Smurfette's Lucky Star" in Cartoon Network and Boomerang airings.
212	32	"The Smurf Who Could Do No Wrong"	Alan Burnett and Fred Kron	November 28, 1987	87–12D	6.79
212	32	"Smurfette's Lucky Star"	Ernie Contreras	November 28, 1987	87–3A	6.79
Homnibus gives Clumsy the Do No Wrong charm, making him do everything perfectly. Smurfette's lucky star falls to the ground with only one wish left before her light goes out. Note: This episode was paired with "Timber Smurf" in Cartoon Network and Boomerang airings.
213	33	"The Smurfy Verdict"	Story by : Sean Catherine Derek; Teleplay by : Terrie Collins	November 28, 1987	87–11D	7.63
213	33	"Chlorhydris's Lost Love"	John Bonaccorsi and Alan Burnett	November 28, 1987	87–4B	7.63
Brainy puts Clumsy on trial for losing Baby during a picnic. Chlorhydris switches Cupid's arrows with hate arrows, resulting the Smurfs being evil again. Vanity and Sassette must help Chlorhydris of saving her lost love trapped in stone.
214	34	"Stop & Go Smurfs"	Therese Naugle	December 5, 1987	87–4D	5.37
214	34	"Poet the Know-It-All"	N/A	December 5, 1987	87–7E	5.37
Upon Painter's request, Papa Smurf enchants Greedy's dinner bell with an immobilizing spell. But the bell is found and taken by a little girl. Poet receives an amulet that tells the future, but Lord Balthazar is looking after it. Note: This episode was paired with "Skyscraper Smurfs" in Cartoon Network and Boomerang airings.
215	35	"All the News That's Fit to Smurf"	Jack Hudock	December 5, 1987	87–3E	7.33
Reporter Smurf uses Handy's printing press to distribute his newspapers. Note: This episode was paired with "Baby's Marvelous Toy" in Cartoon Network and Boomerang airings.
216	36	"Gargamel's Quest"	Story by : Alan Burnett, Ron Campbell, and Hendrik VanLeuven; Teleplay by : Hendrik VanLeuven	December 5, 1987	87–12C	7.66
216	36	"Gargamel's Second Childhood"	Fred Kron	December 5, 1987	87–7D	7.66
Jokey uses a series of pranks to chase Gargamel away from the village. The village is exposed for a short time that night, but Jokey saves the day once again. Gargamel switches ages with Scruple and befriends the Smurflings.

=== Season 8 (1988) ===
No. overall	No. in season	Title	Written by	Story by	Original release date	Prod. code
217	1	"Lost Smurf"	Reed Robbins	Glenn Leopold, Sean Catherine Derek, Kevin Hopps, Bill Matheny, and Ernie Contreras	September 10, 1988	88–1B
Grandpa goes to Castle Captor to save Nanny Smurf.
218	2	"Archives of Evil"	Reed Robbins and Ernie Contreras	Ernie Contreras, Sean Catherine Derek, and Bill Matheny	September 10, 1988	88–12B
Nemesis breaks into the Archives of Evil and uses its magic to steal the Smurfs' long-life stone.
219	3	"Bigmouth's Roommate"	Charles M. Howell, IV	Glenn Leopold and Ernie Contreras	September 17, 1988	88–8A
219	3	"Bungling Babysitters"	Teleplay by : Kristina Mazzotti	Sean Catherine Derek, Ernie Contreras, and Kristina Mazzotti	September 17, 1988	88–6A
Scruple moves in with Bigmouth after Gargamel kicks him out of his house. Hogatha captures Baby due to the stupidity of Handy, Brainy, and Greedy.
220	4	"Clockwork's Powerplay"	Reed Robbins	Glenn Leopold, Bill Matheny, Sean Catherine Derek, and Reed Robbins	September 17, 1988	88–3A
220	4	"Clumsy in Command"	Teleplay by : Ernie Contreras and Therese Naugle	Kevin Hopps, Reed Robbins, Sean Catherine Derek, and Patsy Cameron	September 17, 1988	88–13
Clockwork suffers a powerplay after being struck by lightning. Clumsy and Brainy form hike teams to race to Mt. Majestic and back.
221	5	"Don Smurfo's Uninvited Guests"	Reed Robbins	Sean Catherine Derek, Reed Robbins, and Kristina Mazzotti	September 24, 1988	88–11
Brainy, Nanny, and Snappy get sucked into Don Smurfo's storybook, and they will disappear forever after the last page.
222	6	"Denisa's Greedy Doll"	Teleplay by : John Bonaccorsi	Glenn Leopold and Evelyn A-R Gabai	September 24, 1988	88–10A
222	6	"Denisa's Slumber Party"	Teleplay by : Ernie Contreras	Bill Matheny, Charles M. Howell, IV, and Evelyn A-R Gabai	September 24, 1988	88–12A
Gargamel steals Greedy's apron and puts it on Denisa's doll and makes it a voodoo doll that controls Greedy. Sassette tries to act like an adult, but fails. Later, Sassette finds Denisa suffering after her mom invited the Grackle sisters for a slumber party at Balthazar's castle. Sassette consoles Denisa of how she was treated by her fellow Smurfs. Denisa happily invites Sassette to Balthazar's castle for the party, but this was rejected by Papa, so she sneaks away. Gargamel is watching over the castle that night, while Papa, Smurfette, and the Smurflings go to retrieve Sassette back, after she disobeyed him for not going to Denisa's party.
223	7	"Grandpa's Nemesis"	Ernie Contreras	Glenn Leopold, Sean Catherine Derek, Kevin Hopps, and Bill Matheny	October 1, 1988	88–3A
223	7	"Grandpa's Walking Stick"	Reed Robbins	Glenn Leopold, Sean Catherine Derek, Kevin Hopps, and Bill Matheny	October 1, 1988	88–14
Mother Nature's Earth wand breaks, causing quakes throughout the land. The Smurfs don't believe Grandpa when he tells them that he keeps seeing his old enemy Nemesis. But when he reappears, they do believe him and tells them to hide the long-life stone. While teaching Wild for surviving his fear, Brainy accidentally breaks Grandpa's walking stick and sends the Smurflings to the enchanted forest to find a replacement.
224	8	"A House for Nanny"	Sean Catherine Derek and Glenn Leopold	Sean Catherine Derek, Glenn Leopold, and Kevin Hopps	October 1, 1988	88–10B
Smurfette and Nanny go on a quest for a house warming plant while the rest of the Smurfs build her a house.
225	9	"It's a Smurfy Life"	Reed Robbins	(uncredited)	October 8, 1988	88–N/A
225	9	"Land of Lost and Found"	Glenn Leopold and Kevin Hopps	Kevin Hopps, Glenn Leopold, and Reed Robbins	October 8, 1988	88–2B
Brainy unintentionally maltfuctions Handy's heater and snow plow machines. Handy runs away after the Smurfs think that it was his fault. The Lord of Lost and Found gives back Papa Smurf's telescope in exchange for Brainy's memory, Handy's handiness, and Hefty's strength.
226	10	"Long Live Brainy"	Teleplay by : Earl Kress	Kevin Hopps, Reed Robbins, and Earl Kress	October 8, 1988	88–4C
Brainy becomes king of the Trockles.
227	11	"A Maze of Mirrors"	Teleplay by : Morgan Averill	Bill Matheny	October 15, 1988	88–1C
Vanity ventures into the Mansion of Mirrors. Reflection copies of Vanity follow him out of the mansion.
228	12	"Memory Melons"	Teleplay by : John Bonaccorsi	Glenn Leopold and Scott Shaw	October 15, 1988	88–4B
228	12	"Nanny's Way"	Reed Robbins	Glenn Leopold and Kevin Hopps	October 15, 1988	88–9
Papa Smurf and Homnibus create a memory melon to help Selwyn tell Tallulah how he feels about her, making things even worse. Nanny tries to help the Smurfs with their duties but only gets in the way, so she runs away.
229	13	"Pappy's Puppy"	Earl Kress, Sharon Painter, and Sean Catherine Derek	Glenn Leopold and Sharon Painter	October 22, 1988	88–5A
229	13	"Shutterbug Smurfs"	Ernie Contreras	Kevin Hopps and Ernie Contreras	October 22, 1988	88–1A
Sassette is angry at Snappy, Slouchy, and Nat for not playing with their stuff, so she spends her time with Puppy, making the Smurflings sad. Later, Puppy loses his memory after a fall. Gargamel trains him to be a Smurf catcher, but Puppy's memory returned thanks to Sassette. Handy invents the first Smurf camera, making Painter jealous that pictures can be created so quickly.
230	14	"Smoogle Sings the Blues"	Therese Naugle	Glenn Leopold and Bill Matheny	October 22, 1988	88–N/A
230	14	"A Smurf for Denisa"	Ernie Contreras	Glenn Leopold, Sean Catherine Derek, Kevin Hopps, Bill Matheny, and Evelyn A-R Gabai	October 22, 1988	88–6B
Chlorhydris captures Smoogle and the bluebird of happiness and turns it into the raven of unhappiness, and it's up to Grouchy to saves the day. Sassette and Denisa meet for the first time and become best friends.
231	15	"Smurf the Presses"	Craig Miller and Mark Nelson	Bill Matheny and Ernie Contreras	October 29, 1988	88–4A
Reporter tries to find something new about Gargamel to write.
232	16	"Stealing Grandpa's Thunder"	Teleplay by : John Bonaccorsi	Glenn Leopold and Kevin Hopps	October 29, 1988	88–2A
Grandpa fears Nanny will take his place as storyteller with her better memory. Meanwhile, Wild tries to save the animals for the Stalker, but he and Grandpa get captured by the Stalker.

=== Season 9 (1989) ===
No. overall	No. in season	Title	Written by	Story by	Original release date	Prod. code
233	1	"The Smurfs That Time Forgot" (Act 1–2)	Act 1: Reed Robbins, Glenn Leopold, and Sean Catherine Derek	Glenn Leopold, Sean Catherine Derek, Ernie Contreras, and Reed Robbins	September 9, 1989	901
233	1	"The Smurfs That Time Forgot" (Act 1–2)	Act 2: Glenn Leopold and Sean Catherine Derek	Glenn Leopold, Sean Catherine Derek, Ernie Contreras, and Reed Robbins	September 9, 1989	901
A group of Smurfs travel back in time to return a baby dinosaur to his home.
234	2	"Lost in the Ages"	Glenn Leopold and Sean Catherine Derek	Glenn Leopold, Sean Catherine Derek, Ernie Contreras, and Reed Robbins	September 9, 1989	902
234	2	"Cave Smurfs"	Ernie Contreras, Glenn Leopold, and Sean Catherine Derek	Glenn Leopold, Sean Catherine Derek, Ernie Contreras, and Reed Robbins	September 9, 1989	902
The Smurfs must save Clumsy from Grog the evil caveman. A mother bird thinks Greedy is her son while the real baby bird thinks Brainy is his "shmama".
235	3	"Hogapatra's Beauty Sleep"	Kristina Mazzotti and Ernie Contreras	Glenn Leopold, Sean Catherine Derek, Ernie Contreras, and Reed Robbins	September 16, 1989	903b
235	3	"Mummy Dearest"	Reed Robbins	Glenn Leopold, Sean Catherine Derek, Ernie Contreras, and Reed Robbins	September 16, 1989	904
Hogapatra steals Lazy's pillow for her beauty sleep. Pharaoh servant Gargotec steals a jewel from a mummy while Brainy gets sun burned.
236	4	"Shamrock Smurfs"	Kristina Mazzotti and Glenn Leopold	Glenn Leopold, Sean Catherine Derek, Ernie Contreras, and Reed Robbins	September 16, 1989	903a
Greedy turns into a leprechaun after eating shamrock stew.
237	5	"Karate Clumsy"	Dean Stefan	Glenn Leopold, Sean Catherine Derek, Ernie Contreras, and Reed Robbins	September 23, 1989	917b
237	5	"Like It or Smurf It"	Therese Naugle	Glenn Leopold, Sean Catherine Derek, Ernie Contreras, and Reed Robbins	September 23, 1989	913a
The Master Mouse teaches Clumsy karate so he can save his friends from the Ninja Rat. Brainy invents a new game called "like it or Smurf it" and everyone likes it. But it goes too far when they find dangerous challenges for Hefty.
238	6	"Papa's Big Snooze"	Gordon Bressack and Sean Catherine Derek	Glenn Leopold, Sean Catherine Derek, Ernie Contreras, and Reed Robbins	September 23, 1989	918
Papa is bitten by a slumber bug and falls into a deep sleep, so the Smurfs go on an expedition to save him.
239	7	"A Fish Called Snappy"	Sharon Painter	Glenn Leopold, Sean Catherine Derek, Ernie Contreras, and Reed Robbins	September 30, 1989	915a
239	7	"The Smurf Odyssey"	Ernie Contreras and John Bonaccorsi	Glenn Leopold, Sean Catherine Derek, Ernie Contreras, and Reed Robbins	September 30, 1989	906
A water sprite turns Snappy into a fish while the ship of hungry fishermen arrives. Sassette leads a quest to help a young boy to become a god.
240	8	"Trojan Smurfs"	Craig Miller, Mark Nelson, and Ernie Contreras	Glenn Leopold, Sean Catherine Derek, Ernie Contreras, and Reed Robbins	September 30, 1989	905b
A spoiled princess takes Smurfette as her doll.
241	9	"Fortune Cookie"	Therese Naugle	Glenn Leopold, Sean Catherine Derek, Ernie Contreras, and Reed Robbins	October 7, 1989	911b
241	9	"Imperial Panda-Monium"	Sean Catherine Derek, John Loy, and John Ludin	Glenn Leopold, Sean Catherine Derek, Ernie Contreras, and Reed Robbins	October 7, 1989	912
Brainy attempts to write his own fortune cookies for the Smurfs but Jokey replaces them with his fortunes. Snappy wanders away from the Smurfs to find a young emperor in danger by his cousins.
242	10	"Smurfette's Green Thumb"	Kristina Mazzotti and Glenn Leopold	Glenn Leopold, Sean Catherine Derek, Ernie Contreras, and Reed Robbins	October 7, 1989	905a
A talking flower pricks Smurfette's thumb and everytime she touches something becomes a flower.
243	11	"Hefty Sees a Serpent"	Meg McLaughlin and Sean Catherine Derek	Glenn Leopold, Sean Catherine Derek, Ernie Contreras, and Reed Robbins	October 14, 1989	915b
No one believes Hefty when he has seen a serpent in the Scotland lake except for the evil Angus McGarg.
244	12	"Phantom Bagpiper"	Sharon Painter and Sean Catherine Derek	Glenn Leopold, Sean Catherine Derek, Ernie Contreras, and Reed Robbins	October 14, 1989	916
244	12	"Jungle Jitterbug"	Kristina Mazzotti and Glenn Leopold	Glenn Leopold, Sean Catherine Derek, Ernie Contreras, and Reed Robbins	October 14, 1989	921b
Smurfette helps a bagpipe playing ghost retrieve his stolen pony from his evil neighbor by competing as a horse jockey in a race against the neighbor. Vanity catches the jungle jitterbug and he can't stop dancing.
245	13	"The Clumsy Genie"	Fred Kron and Glenn Leopold	Glenn Leopold, Sean Catherine Derek, Ernie Contreras, Reed Robbins, John Loy, and John Ludin	October 21, 1989	910
245	13	"Scary Smurfs"	Reed Robbins and Dick Robbins	Glenn Leopold, Sean Catherine Derek, Ernie Contreras, and Reed Robbins	October 21, 1989	924b
Clumsy falls into a genie lamp, allowing the real genie to flee, so it's up to Brainy, Smurfette, and Vanity to get the genie back into his lamp. The Smurfs get turned into monsters after nibbling on a gingerbread house in Germany.
246	14	"Sky High Surprise"	Tom Spath and Reed Robbins	Glenn Leopold, Sean Catherine Derek, Ernie Contreras, and Reed Robbins	October 21, 1989	909b
The time crystals are stolen from a band of babies with flying carpets, so Jokey must retrieve or they will be lost forever.
247	15	"Gnoman Holiday"	Ernie Contreras and John Bonaccorsi	Glenn Leopold, Sean Catherine Derek, Ernie Contreras, and Reed Robbin's	October 28, 1989	908
Smurfette is forced to marry a prince in the gnome version of Rome unless Brainy wins a gladiator fight.
248	16	"Greedy's Masterpizza"	Teleplay by : Kristina Mazzotti and Ernie Contreras	Ernie Contreras and Kelly Aumier	October 28, 1989	907b
248	16	"The Monumental Grouch"	Sean Catherine Derek and Meg McLaughlin	Glenn Leopold, Sean Catherine Derek, Ernie Contreras, and Reed Robbins	October 28, 1989	907a
Greedy helps an Italian cook to bake the greatest pizza ever when his recipe is stolen by Gargensole. Painter's statue of Grouchy comes to life and follows Grouchy around.
249	17	"Curried Smurfs"	Dean Stefan, Glenn Leopold, and Sean Catherine Derek	Glenn Leopold, Sean Catherine Derek, Ernie Contreras, and Reed Robbins	November 4, 1989	926
Wild, Grandpa, and Jokey are captured by Gargapuri and wants to sold them as exotic animals.
250	18	"G'Day Smoogle"	Dean Stefan and Ernie Contreras	Glenn Leopold, Sean Catherine Derek, Ernie Contreras, and Reed Robbins	November 4, 1989	917a
250	18	"Grandpa's Fountain of Youth"	Teleplay by : Dean Stefan	Glenn Leopold, Sean Catherine Derek, Ernie Contreras, Reed Robbins, and Dean Stefan	November 4, 1989	921a
Smoogle finds more of his kind in Australia and now he has to save them with his new power. Grandpa is affected by the Fountain of Youth and Sassette must take care of him.
251	19	"Big Shot Smurfs"	Kristina Mazzotti and Glenn Leopold	Glenn Leopold, Sean Catherine Derek, Ernie Contreras, and Reed Robbins	November 11, 1989	919b
251	19	"No Reflection on Vanity"	Sharon Painter and Reed Robbins	Glenn Leopold, Sean Catherine Derek, Ernie Contreras, and Reed Robbins	November 11, 1989	925a
Brainy and Greedy find themselves on the opposite sides of an island of tiny people. In Antarctica, a penguin takes Vanity's mirror, so Vanity tries to find his reflection in everything.
252	20	"Papa Loses His Patience"	Tom Spath and Sean Catherine Derek	Glenn Leopold, Sean Catherine Derek, Ernie Contreras, and Reed Robbins	November 11, 1989	919a
252	20	"Swashbuckling Smurfs"	Teleplay by : Gordon Bressack	Glenn Leopold, Sean Catherine Derek, Ernie Contreras, and Reed Robbins	November 11, 1989	920
Papa's patience ends up on El Gargo, thanks to Brainy. A parrot pirate unearths the clamulet and puts some Smurfs under his spell.
253	21	"Painter's Egg-Cellent Adventure"	Fred Kron and Glenn Leopold	Glenn Leopold	November 18, 1989	922
253	21	"Small Minded Smurfs"	Fred Kron	Glenn Leopold, Sean Catherine Derek, Ernie Contreras, and Reed Robbins	November 18, 1989	909a
Painter must get a magic chicken in Russia to start laying painted eggs again. A jungle man shrinks the Smurfs' heads, so Clumsy and his new friend monkey Chimpy must find the antidote.
254	22	"Bananas Over Hefty"	Glenn Leopold, Reed Robbins, and Ernie Contreras	Glenn Leopold, Sean Catherine Derek, Ernie Contreras, and Reed Robbins	November 18, 1989	913b
254	22	"The Smurfs of the Round Table"	Reed Robbins and Sean Catherine Derek	Glenn Leopold, Sean Catherine Derek, Ernie Contreras, and Reed Robbins	November 18, 1989	914
An orangutan falls in love with Hefty and takes him along with the time crystals. Evil witch Morgan le Fay attacks Camelot, steals Excalibur, and makes a real destruction there, so it's up to the Smurfs to defeat her.
255	23	"Wild Goes Cuckoo"	Kristina Mazzotti and Ernie Contreras	Kristina Mazzotti, Glenn Leopold, Ernie Contreras, and Reed Robbins	December 2, 1989	925b
255	23	"Brainy's Beastly Boo-Boo"	Dean Stefan and Sean Catherine Derek	Reed Robbins and Sean Catherine Derek	December 2, 1989	924a
After Wild releases a cuckoo from a cuckoo clock that stops time, the man that owns the clock uses Wild as a replacement. Brainy steals a magic powder and accidentally turns himself, Snappy, Sassette, Baby and two kids from Africa into animals.
256	24	"The Golden Rhino"	Glenn Leopold, Sean Catherine Derek, and Reed Robbins	(uncredited)	December 2, 1989	923
256	24	"Hearts 'N' Smurfs"	Teleplay by : Fred Kron	Reed Robbins, Glenn Leopold, Ernie Contreras, Bill Matheny, and Sean Catherine Derek	December 2, 1989	911a
Handy and Clumsy help a young boy rescue his golden horned rhino from a greedy trader. Hefty, Clumsy, and Brainy try to help Cupid spread love, but Brainy is captured by Van Garg and starts spread nastiness instead.

=== Specials ===
No.	Title	Directed by	Written by	Original release date	Prod. code
S01	"Here Comes the Smurfs"	Unknown	Unknown	November 29, 1981	000
An hour-long special that aired the episodes "The Smurfette", "Supersmurf", and "The Baby Smurf", with new narration from Papa Smurf telling the stories.
S02	"The Smurfs Springtime Special"	Gerard Baldwin	Story by : Peyo and Yvan Delporte; Teleplay by : Len Janson and Chuck Menville	April 8, 1982	127
On Easter, Gargamel puts a sleeping spell on Mother Nature to capture the Smurfs.
S03	"The Smurfs Christmas; Special"	Gerard Baldwin	Story by : Gerard Baldwin, Peyo, and Yvan Delporte; Teleplay by : Len Janson and Chuck Menville	December 12, 1982	223
On Christmas, an evil wizard helps Gargamel capture two children, and it's up to the Smurfs to save Christmas with their goodness.
S04	"My Smurfy Valentine"	Gerard Baldwin	Story by : Peyo, Yvan Delporte, Len Janson, Chuck Menville, and Gerard Baldwin; Teleplay by : Len Janson and Chuck Menville	February 13, 1983	224
On Valentine's Day, Chlorhydris plans to eliminate all love around the world by using a well and she needs Azrael as a key for it. Smurfette follows her to the well to have her very own Prince Smurfing.
S05	"The Smurfic Games"	Gerard Baldwin	Story by : Peyo and Yvan Delporte; Teleplay by : Patsy Cameron and Tedd Anasti	May 20, 1984	331
The Smurfs form teams to compete in The Smurfic Games.
S06	"Smurfily Ever After"	Gerard Baldwin	Patsy Cameron and Tedd Anasti (story + teleplay)	February 13, 1985	429
The Smurfs prepare for the wedding of Laconia and Woody.
S07	"'Tis the Season to Be; Smurfy"	Ray Patterson	Glenn Leopold	December 13, 1987	729
Wild celebrates his first Christmas with the Smurfs, but Grandpa and Sassette want to help an old puppet toymaker and his wife have a beautiful Christmas.
