= The Smurfs (1981 TV series) =

Animated television series

- International title card for season 1
- Also known as: Smurfs (1980s airings); Smurfs' Adventures (in syndication)
- Genre: Animated sitcom; Adventure; Fantasy; Comedy; Slapstick
- Created by: Pierre "Peyo" Culliford
- Based on: The Smurfs by Pierre "Peyo" Culliford
- Directed by: Bob Hathcock (seasons 1–2, 5); George Gordon (seasons 1–4); Rudy Zamora (seasons 1–6); Carl Urbano (seasons 1–6, 8); John Walker (seasons 3–4); Oscar Dufau (seasons 3–4, 9); Alan Zaslove (seasons 4–5); Don Lusk (seasons 5–6, 8–9); Jay Sarbry (seasons 6–9); John Kimball (seasons 7); Bob Goe (seasons 7–8); Paul Sommer (seasons 7–9); Gerard Baldwin (specials 2–6); Ray Patterson (specials 7); Gordon Hunt (recording director)
- Voices of: See Voices
- Theme music composer: Mireille Delfosse (worldwide version); Hoyt Curtin (seasons 1–8, American version); Tom Worrall (season 9, American version)
- Opening theme: "The Smurfy Way" (worldwide); "La La Song" (season 2, United States); "Johan and Peewit" (Johan and Peewit episodes only, worldwide)
- Ending theme: "The Smurfy Way" (instrumental); "La La Song" (instrumental)
- Composers: Hoyt Curtin; Clark Gassman (season 9)
- Countries of origin: United States; Belgium
- Original languages: English; French
- No. of seasons: 9
- No. of episodes: 256 (417 segments) (list of episodes)

Production
- Executive producers: William Hanna; Joseph Barbera; Freddy Monnickendam (seasons 6–7; special 7)
- Producers: Gerard Baldwin (seasons 1–3); Bob Hathcock (seasons 4–6); Don Jurwich (season 7; special 7); Walt Kubiak (season 7); Paul Sabella (seasons 8–9)
- Editor: Gil Iverson
- Running time: 22 minutes
- Production companies: Hanna-Barbera Productions (Note: Animation outsourced to Wang Film Productions and Toei Animation beginning with season 6 and Saerom Animation beginning with season 7.); SEPP International S.A. (seasons 1–7); Lafig S.A. (seasons 8–9)

Original release
- Network: NBC
- Release: September 12, 1981 – December 2, 1989

Related
- The Smurfs (1961 TV series); The Smurfs (2021 TV series)

The Smurfs (originally broadcast as Smurfs and syndicated as Smurfs' Adventures) is an animated sitcom that originally aired on NBC from September 12, 1981 to December 2, 1989. Produced by Hanna-Barbera Productions, it is based on the Belgian comic series of the same name, created by Belgian cartoonist Peyo (who also served as story supervisor of this adaptation) and aired for 256 episodes with a total of 417 stories, excluding three cliffhangers and seven specials. It was the longest-running Saturday morning animated series in the United States until Teenage Mutant Ninja Turtles surpassed it in 1996 with its tenth season.

== History ==
In 1976, Stuart R. Ross, an American media and entertainment entrepreneur who saw the Smurfs while traveling in Belgium, entered into an agreement with Editions Dupuis and Peyo, acquiring North American and other rights to the characters, whose original name was "les Schtroumpfs". Subsequently, Ross launched the Smurfs in the United States in association with a California company, Wallace Berrie and Co., whose figurines, dolls and other Smurf merchandise became a hugely popular success. NBC President Fred Silverman's daughter, Melissa, had a Smurf doll of her own that he had bought for her at a toy shop while they were visiting Aspen, Colorado. Silverman thought that a series based on the Smurfs might make a good addition to the Saturday-morning cartoon lineup.

Smurfs, produced by Hanna-Barbera Productions in association with SEPP International S.A. (from 1981 to 1987) and Lafig S.A. (in the years 1988 and 1989), debuted on NBC in 1981 in an hour-long timeslot. The series became a major success for the network (one of the few hits to emerge from the Silverman era) and one of the most successful and longest-running Saturday morning cartoons in television history, spawning seven spin-off television specials on an almost yearly basis. The characters included Papa Smurf, Smurfette, Brainy Smurf, the evil Gargamel, his cat Azrael, and Johan and his friend Peewit. The Smurfs was nominated multiple times for Daytime Emmy Awards and won Outstanding Children's Entertainment Series in 1982–1983.

By 1989, the show was in its ninth season and had reached the 200-episode threshold, an extreme rarity when most cartoons were gone after two seasons and 22 episodes (it also far exceeded the typical 65-episode run of a first-run syndicated show of the era). In an effort to come up with new ideas to keep the show fresh, NBC changed the format of the show, taking some of the Smurfs out of the forest and omitting the Smurf Village. These changes were adopted to a lost-in-time format similar to The Time Tunnel (at the same time NBC had a hit with the prime time series Quantum Leap which also dealt with time travel). The show continued through the end of the season, airing the last original episode 2 December 1989 on NBC, after a decade of success, NBC later cancelled The Smurfs along with other Saturday-morning cartoons to make way for another block of live-action programming on 9 April 1990. In addition, Smurfs creator Peyo ended further collaborations between The Smurfs and Hanna Barbara in protest to their decision to use the Smurfs in the April 1990 special Cartoon All Stars to the Rescue without his permission; he would later die in December 1992. The Smurfs had its last re-run on NBC on 25 August 1990. The total number of individual eleven minute and twenty-two minute cartoons in the entire series run came to 417.

== Episodes ==
Season	Segments	Episodes	Originally released	
Season	Segments	Episodes	First released	Last released
1	39	26	September 12, 1981	December 5, 1981
2	46	36	September 18, 1982	December 4, 1982
3	55	32	September 17, 1983	November 26, 1983
4	48	26	September 15, 1984	November 17, 1984
5	40	24	September 21, 1985	November 9, 1985
6	61	36	September 13, 1986	November 29, 1986
7	65	36	September 19, 1987	December 5, 1987
8	24	16	September 10, 1988	October 29, 1988
9	39	24	September 9, 1989	December 2, 1989
Specials	N/A	7	November 29, 1981	December 13, 1987

== Voice cast and characters ==
- Charlie Adler as Nat Smurfling, Glut (in "Clumsy's Cloud"), Grogg (in "The Smurfs That Time Forgot")
- Jack Angel as Enchanter Homnibus, Additional voices
- Marlene Aragon as Additional voices
- Bob Arbogast as Additional voices
- Lewis Arquette as Additional voices
- René Auberjonois as Additional voices
- Jered Barclay as Additional voices
- Bernard Behrens as Additional voices
- Michael Bell as Grouchy Smurf, Handy Smurf, Lazy Smurf, Johan, Painter Smurf (in "The Hundredth Smurf"), Gargamel (Season 9), Additional voices
- Gregg Berger as Additional voices
- Joe Besser as Cupid
- Lucille Bliss as Smurfette
- Susan Blu as Nanny Smurf, Pansy
- Sorrell Booke as Additional voices
- Peter Brooks as Additional voices
- Greg Burson as Additional voices
- Ruth Buzzi as Additional voices
- William Callaway as Clumsy Smurf, Painter Smurf, Don Smurfo, Additional voices
- Joey Camen as Natural Smurf (adult form)
- Hamilton Camp as Greedy Smurf, Harmony Smurf, Woody, Additional voices
- Roger C. Carmel as Additional voices
- Victoria Carroll as Additional voices
- Mary Jo Catlett as Madame Hildegarde (in "Stop and Go Smurfs")
- William Christopher as Angel Smurf
- Philip L. Clarke as Additional voices
- Selette Cole as Additional voices
- Townsend Coleman as Additional voices
- Henry Corden as Grako (in "The Magic Fountain")
- Regis Cordic as Additional voices
- Peter Cullen as Zeus (in "The Smurf Odyssey"), Gluttonous the Gourmet (in "A Fish Called Snappy"), Additional voices
- Brian Cummings as Additional voices
- Jim Cummings as the Sultan of Sweets (in "Sky High Surprise")
- Keene Curtis as Lord Balthazar
- Jennifer Darling as Princess Sabina, Additional voices
- Leo De Lyon as Additional voices
- Barry Dennen as Additional voices
- Bronwen Denton-Davis as Additional voices
- Patti Deutsch as Bignose, Additional voices
- Walker Edmiston as Additional voices
- Marshall Efron as Sloppy Smurf
- Paul Eiding as Additional voices
- Richard Erdman as Additional voices
- Bernard Erhard as Timber Smurf
- June Foray as Jokey Smurf, Mother Nature, Gargamel’s mother, Additional voices
- Pat Fraley as Tuffy Smurf, Additional voices
- Teresa Ganzel as Additional voices
- Linda Gary as Dame Barbara, Chlorhydris (all episodes except the special "My Smurfy Valentine")
- Dick Gautier as Wooly Smurf
- Joan Gerber as Priscilla (in "The Tear of a Smurf"), Gowagga Puppet (in "Snappy's Puppet"), Additional voices
- Henry Gibson as Additional voices
- Ed Gilbert as Additional voices
- Patty Glick as Additional voices
- Danny Goldman as Brainy Smurf
- Barry Gordon as the Gamemaster (in "The Grouchiest Game in Town")
- Joy Grdnic as Additional voices
- Ernest Harada as Additional voices
- Phil Hartman as Additional voices
- Billie Hayes as Drusilla (in "Chlorhydris’s Lost Love")
- Bob Holt as the Good King
- Jerry Houser as Ripple (in "The Smurflings' Unsmurfy Friend"), Tebuli the Genie (in "The Clumsy Genie"), Additional voices
- John Ingle as Additional voices
- Robert Ito as Additional voices
- Tony Jay as Merlin (in "The Smurfs of the Round Table")
- Arte Johnson as Devil Smurf
- Marvin Kaplan as Gourdy (in "Farmer's Genii", "The Tallest Smurf", and "Master Scruple")
- Zale Kessler as Additional voices
- Aron Kincaid as Additional voices
- Kip King as Tailor Smurf
- Paul Kirby as Additional voices
- Clyde Kusatsu as Additional voices
- Robbie Lee as Additional voices
- Ruta Lee as Evelyn (in "Gargamel's Sweetheart"), Morgan le Fay (in "The Smurfs of the Round Table")
- Katie Leigh as Denisa (in "A Smurf for Denisa", "Denisa's Greedy Doll", and "Denisa's Slumber Party")
- Michael Lembeck as Additional voices
- Marilyn Lightstone as Additional voices
- Keye Luke as Additional voices
- Allan Lurie as Additional voices
- Jim MacGeorge as Additional voices
- Norma MacMillan as Brenda (in "The Littlest Witch")
- Tress MacNeille as Simon (in "The Littlest Giant"), Sylvia (in "The Smurf Odyssey"), Additional voices
- Patty Maloney as Blue Eyes (in "The Little Orange Horse with the Gold Shoes" and "Blue Eyes Returns")
- Danny Mann as Additional voices
- Kenneth Mars as King Bullrush, Julius Geezer (in "Gnoman Holiday"), Additional voices
- Mona Marshall as Weepy Smurf, Flowerbell (in "Papa's Wedding Day"), Andria (in "Wedding Bells for Gargamel")
- Amanda McBroom as Chlorhydris (in the special "My Smurfy Valentine"), Additional voices
- Chuck McCann as Additional voices
- Julie McWhirter as Baby Smurf, Sassette Smurfling
- Allan Melvin as Dufus the Giant (in "Gargamel's Giant"), Additional voices
- Don Messick as Papa Smurf, Azrael, Dreamy Smurf, Chitter the Squirrel, Sickly Smurf, Sweepy Smurf, Additional voices
- Sidney Miller as Additional voices
- Larry Moss as Additional voices
- Janice Motoike as Additional voices
- Pat Musick as Snappy Smurfling
- Frank Nelson as Nosey Smurf, Additional voices
- Noelle North as Slouchy Smurfling
- Alan Oppenheimer as Vanity Smurf, Father Time, Additional voices
- Patricia Parris as Acorn
- Rob Paulsen as Marco Smurf, Additional voices
- Clare Peck as Additional voices
- Diane Pershing as Additional voices
- Brock Peters as the Ambassador of Zad (in "The Moor’s Baby")
- Patrick Pinney as Additional voices
- Henry Polic II as Tracker Smurf, Keswick (in "Legendary Smurfs"), Additional voices
- Philip Proctor as King Gerard
- Clive Revill as Additional voices
- Robert Ridgely as Additional voices
- Neil Ross as Additional voices
- Joseph Ruskin as Additional voices
- Will Ryan as Slime the Wartmonger, Anton (in "Legendary Smurfs")
- Michael Rye as Morlock (in "The Prince and the Hopper" and "Gargamel's New Job"), Additional voices
- Bob Sarlatte as Additional voices
- Ronnie Schell as Pushover Smurf, Reporter Smurf, Jokey Smurf (in "The Smurfette" and "Vanity Fare"), Dreamy Smurf (in "The Astrosmurf"), Additional Voices
- Marilyn Schreffler as Additional voices
- Avery Schreiber as Additional voices
- Franklin Seales as Additional voices
- Susan Silo as Petaluma (in "Smurfette's Flower"), Additional voices
- Hal Smith as Sludge the Wartmonger, Dismal Boggs (in "The Secret of Shadow Swamp"), Additional voices
- Kath Soucie as Adella (in "Stop and Go Smurfs"), Ali Baby (in "Sky High Surprise"), Additional voices
- John Stephenson as the Treasure Hunter Imp and the Spirit of the Ancient Trolls (in "Smurfette's Dancing Shoes"), Malakov (in "Dancing Bear" and "I Was a Brainy Weresmurf"), Additional voices
- Kris Erik Stevens as Additional voices
- Alexandra Stoddart as Additional voices
- Andre Stojka as Additional voices
- Dee Stratton as Additional voices
- George Takei as Additional voices
- Mark L. Taylor as Additional voices
- Russi Taylor as Smoogle, Brenda (in "Scruple's Sweetheart"), Additional voices
- Susan Tolsky as Additional voices
- Fred Travalena as Additional voices
- Marcelo Tubert as Additional voices
- Brenda Vaccaro as Scruple, Architect Smurf
- Janet Waldo as Hogatha
- Ray Walston as Additional voices
- Peggy Walton-Walker as Additional voices
- B. J. Ward as Hermes (in "The Smurf Odyssey"), Additional voices
- Peggy Webber as Elderberry
- Lennie Weinrib as Bigmouth
- Frank Welker as Hefty Smurf, Clockwork Smurf, Peewit, Poet Smurf, Puppy, Wild Smurf, Nemesis, Sandman, Additional voices
- Paul Winchell as Gargamel (Season 1–8), Flighty Smurf, Additional voices
- Jonathan Winters as Grandpa Smurf
- Francine Witkin as Lady Luck (in "Bad Luck Smurfs")
- Anderson Wong as Additional voices
- Michael Wong as Additional voices
- Alan Young as Farmer Smurf, Miner Smurf, Scaredy Smurf, Milton McKilty (in "Phantom Bagpiper"), Additional voices

== Production ==
Animation work was done in-house by Hanna-Barbera Productions for the first 5 seasons, production work was done by Wang Film Productions/Cuckoo's Nest Studios for seasons 6-7 and, only for Season 7, by Toei Animation.

=== Use of classical music ===
The background music for The Smurfs was composed by Hoyt Curtin, Hanna-Barbera's primary musical director, but Curtin's work on the series is noted for its frequent use of classical music as themes or leitmotifs. Notable classical works excerpted in The Smurfs include:

- Isaac Albéniz, Suite española, "Asturias"
- Johann Sebastian Bach, Brandenburg Concerto No. 2, BWV 1047, Allegro moderato
- Johann Sebastian Bach, Concerto for harpsichord, strings & continuo No. 5, BWV 1056, Arioso. Largo
- Johann Sebastian Bach, Orchestral Suite No. 3, BWV 1068, Gavotte
- Ludwig van Beethoven, Piano Sonata No. 8 (Pathétique), first movement
- Ludwig van Beethoven, Piano Sonata No. 14 (Moonlight), third movement
  - The above two tunes are frequently used in scenes where the Smurfs are in danger, or which otherwise have a great deal of dramatic tension.
- Ludwig van Beethoven, Piano Sonata No. 23 (Appassionata), first movement
- Ludwig van Beethoven, Symphony No. 1, first movement
- Ludwig van Beethoven, Symphony No. 6 (Pastoral), first and fourth movements
- Ludwig van Beethoven, Symphony No. 9 (Choral), second movement
- Hector Berlioz, Symphonie fantastique, second movement
- Léon Boëllmann, Suite gothique, Toccata
- Alexander Borodin, Polovtsian Dances, Fifth Dance: "Dance of the Boys"
- Johannes Brahms, Wiegenlied (Brahms)
- Anton Bruckner, Symphony No. 2, third movement
- Claude Debussy, Prélude à l'après-midi d'un faune (used primarily in season 1)
- Claude Debussy, Prelude Book 2 No. 6, Général Lavine – eccentric
- Paul Dukas, The Sorcerer's Apprentice
- Edward Elgar, Pomp and Circumstance March No. 1 ("Land of Hope and Glory")
- Edward Elgar, The Wand of Youth, Suite No. 1
- César Franck, Symphony in D minor, first and second movements
- Edvard Grieg, Peer Gynt: "Morning Mood" and "In the Hall of the Mountain King"
  - "Morning Mood" is frequently heard when Mother Nature makes an appearance
- Edvard Grieg, Lyric Suite, "March of the Dwarfs"
- Albert Ketèlbey, In a Persian Market
- Lev Knipper, Polyushko-polye, known in English as "Meadowlands", "Song of the Plains", or "Cavalry of the Steppes"; used in season 2 only
- Zoltán Kodály, Háry János Suite
- Franz Liszt, Hungarian Rhapsody No. 2, Friska (episode "Harmony Steals the Show")
- Franz Liszt, Piano Concerto No. 1
- Franz Liszt, Totentanz
- Franz Liszt, Transcendental étude No. 6, "Vision"
- Felix Mendelssohn, Spring Song
- Felix Mendelssohn, Wedding March (Mendelssohn) (episode "The Three Smurfketeers")
- Wolfgang Amadeus Mozart, The Magic Flute
- Wolfgang Amadeus Mozart, The Marriage of Figaro
- Wolfgang Amadeus Mozart, Symphony No. 35 in D major, K.385 "Haffner", 4th movement, "The Smurflings" episode (just a very slowed down version)
- Wolfgang Amadeus Mozart, Symphony No. 40 in G minor, K.550, 1st movement, (episode "The Haunted Smurfs")
- Modest Mussorgsky, Pictures at an Exhibition: Gnomus, Tuileries, Gargamel's theme variation about 1.5 minutes in, and a scene segue part about 10 minutes in, are used in the cartoon.
- Modest Mussorgsky, Night on the Bare Mountain
- Sergey Prokofiev, Symphony No. 1 ("Classical"): Gavotta
- Sergey Prokofiev, Romeo and Juliet
- Sergey Prokofiev, Peter and the Wolf
- Sergey Prokofiev, Lieutenant Kijé
- Sergey Prokofiev, Scythian Suite
- Sergei Rachmaninov, Prelude in G minor
- Maurice Ravel, Gaspard de la nuit: Le gibet
- Nikolai Rimsky-Korsakov, Scheherazade (introducing theme for Gargamel)
- Nikolai Rimsky-Korsakov, The Snow Maiden: Dance of the Tumblers
- Nikolai Rimsky-Korsakov, The Golden Cockerel
- Nikolai Rimsky-Korsakov, Flight of the Bumblebee
- Gioachino Rossini, William Tell Overture
- Camille Saint-Saëns, Symphony No. 3 ("Organ"), first movement
- Franz Schubert: Rosamunde: Ballet Music No. 2
- Franz Schubert: Serenade
- Franz Schubert, Symphony No. 8 ("Unfinished"), first movement, used as Gargamel's theme and used in scenes when the Smurfs are in danger
- Jean Sibelius, Finlandia
- Richard Strauss, Till Eulenspiegels lustige Streiche
- Igor Stravinsky, The Firebird
- Igor Stravinsky, The Rite of Spring
- Igor Stravinsky, Petrushka: Russian Dance
- Pyotr Ilyich Tchaikovsky, Natha Waltz
- Pyotr Ilyich Tchaikovsky, Russian Dance
- Pyotr Ilyich Tchaikovsky, The Nutcracker
- Pyotr Ilyich Tchaikovsky, The Nutcracker, Reed Flutes (episode "How To Smurf A Rainbow")
- Pyotr Ilyich Tchaikovsky, The Seasons: June, August
- Pyotr Ilyich Tchaikovsky, Swan Lake
- Pyotr Ilyich Tchaikovsky, Symphony No. 4: Finale (Allegro con fuoco)
- Pyotr Ilyich Tchaikovsky, Symphony No. 6 ("Pathétique"), second theme from first movement
- Pyotr Ilyich Tchaikovsky, Romeo and Juliet Fantasy Overture (used in scenes of love)
- Richard Wagner, Die Meistersinger von Nürnberg Overture
- Richard Wagner, The Ring

== Syndication ==
A half-hour version for syndication was broadcast under the title Smurfs' Adventures since 1986. Although each season had its own unique opening song during the original broadcast, syndicated airings usually use a shortened version of the season 4 opening. The series aired on Cartoon Network in the past and currently on Boomerang. On August 7, 2023, the series began airing on Discovery Family, and on MeTV Toons when it launched on June 25, 2024.

== Home media ==
=== Region 1 ===
Warner Home Video released the complete first season on DVD in a two-volume set in 2008. Despite high sales of both sets, no further seasons have been released. Warner Home Video later released a series of three single-disc releases of The Smurfs in 2009, each containing five episodes from the second season. A two-disc DVD was set to be released in 2011 to tie into the theatrical film with 10 episodes which would be culled from the entire run of the series, instead, it included episodes from the second season. Another DVD with both Smurfs Christmas specials was released later that year. As of 2026, it is still unknown if Warner Archive will release the rest of the show's complete seasons on Blu-ray.

In 2020, HBO Max released seasons one to four on its online streaming platform. The available seasons are presented in 1080p high definition.

DVD title	Season(s)	Episode count	Release date	Description
Season 1 Volume 1	1	13	26 February 2008	This two-disc release contained the first 19 season one episodes, uncut, unedited and digitally remastered, and presented in their original broadcast presentation and order. Special features included a bonus episode "The Smurfs Springtime Special", and the Smurfs music video.
Season 1 Volume 2	1	13	7 October 2008	This two-disc release contained the remaining 20 season one episodes, plus one special feature, "I Smurf The Smurfs".
True Blue Friends	2	5	3 March 2009	Contains five season two episodes: "S-Shivering S-Smurfs", "Turncoat Smurf", "The Smurf Who Couldn't Say No", "The Haunted Castle", and "The Black Hellebore". Special features include a storyboard of "Gormandizing Greedy".
Smurfy Tales	2	5	18 August 2009	Contains five season two episodes: "The Last Laugh", "The A-maze-ing Smurfs", "The Lost City of Yore", "Johan's Army", and "The Good, The Bad, and the Smurfy". Special features include bios of Handy Smurf, Clumsy Smurf, Smurfette, and Vanity Smurf.
World of Wonders	2	5	17 November 2009	Contains five season two episodes "All's Smurfy That Ends Smurfy", "The Littlest Giant", "Sleepwalking Smurfs", "Squeaky", and "The Sorcery of Maltrochu". Special features include the Meet The Smurfs feature, which shows Jokey, Brainy, and Greedy, plus an Easter egg: if the viewer clicks on the telescope, it shows something that is "rated S for Smurfy", presented as if it was a science-fiction movie. It starts out with Dreamy asking if there is life in "outer smurf", and shows Hefty saying, "There is no life in outer smurf", ending with the announcer saying "It Came from Outer Smurf. Coming Soon." Also of note is that Greedy's image is actually Cook Smurf's image, which is what the cartoon version of Greedy is based on.
A Magical Smurf Adventure	2	10	19 July 2011	Contains 10 season two episodes "Smurf Van Winkle", "Revenge of the Smurfs", "Magic Fountain", "Smurf Me No Flowers", "The Cursed Country", "The Blue Plague", "The Ring of Castellac", "A Mere Truffle", "Gormandizing Greedy", and "Sister Smurf". Special features include Smurf Speak.
Holiday Celebration	—N/a	2	11 October 2011	Contains both Christmas specials "'Tis the Season to Be Smurfy" and "The Smurfs Christmas Special"
The Best of Seasons 1 and 2	1, 2	24	12 March 2013	Repackage contains the first discs from the Season 1 Volumes 1 and 2 and A Magical Smurf Adventure sets.
Smurfs to the Rescue!	1, 2	6	16 July 2013	Contains one season one episode, and five season two episodes "The Goblin of Boulder Wood", "Sideshow Smurfs", "The Three Smurfketeers", "It Came from Outer Smurf", "One Good Smurf Deserves Another", and "The Sky is Smurfing! The Sky is Smurfing!"
Smurftastic Journey	1	6	15 October 2013	Contains six cartoons (equal to four episodes worth) from season one, "The Astrosmurf", "Painter and Poet", "Paradise Smurfed", "Supersmurf", "Dreamy's Nightmare", and "All That Glitters Isn't Smurf"
A Magical Smurf Adventure 2	1	6	5 November 2013	Contains six season one episodes, "The Baby Smurf", "The Fake Smurf", "Bewitched, Bothered, And Be-Smurfed", "Fuzzle Trouble", "The Smurfette", "The Magical Meanie".
The Smurfs Springtime Specials	3 TV specials	6	21 February 2023	Contains three TV Specials "The Smurfs Springtime Special", "My Smurfy Valentine", & "Smurfily Ever After"

=== Region 2 ===
Fabulous Films and Arrow Films have released the first five seasons on DVD in the UK. The company has also released the film The Smurfs and the Magic Flute on Blu-ray and DVD, as well as several compilation DVDs, containing themed specials from the show.

DVD name	Ep #	Release date
Complete 1st Season	27	5 July 2010
Complete 2nd Season	24	6 September 2010
Complete 3rd Season	31	1 July 2013
Complete 4th Season	28	1 July 2013
Complete 5th Season	25	1 July 2013
The Complete Seasons 1–5	135	1 December 2014
The Smurfs – Four Smurf-tastic Episodes	4	30 July 2011
The Smurfs and the Magic Flute (Blu-ray + DVD)	0	11 October 2011
The Smurfs: 'Tis the Season to Be Smurfy	4	5 November 2011
The Smurfs: My Smurfy Valentine	4	8 January 2012
The Smurfs Springtime Special	6	17 March 2012
The Smurfs: The Smurfic Games	7	4 June 2012
The Smurfs Halloween Special	6	1 October 2012
The Smurfs: Love, Smurfette	6	1 July 2013
The Smurfs: Papa Smurf Rocks!	6	1 July 2013
The Smurfs: World Cup Carnival	5	23 June 2014

Sony Pictures Home Entertainment has released the full Series in 9 season sets on DVD in Germany, with German sound only, from August 2011 to July 2013.

DVD name	Ep #	Release date
Die komplette erste Staffel	27	4 August 2011
Die komplette zweite Staffel	24	4 August 2011
Die komplette dritte Staffel	31	14 October 2011
Die komplette vierte Staffel	28	14 October 2011
Die komplette fünfte Staffel	25	16 August 2012
Die komplette sechste Staffel	39	16 August 2012
Die komplette siebte Staffel	40	25 July 2013
Die komplette achte Staffel	16 (including 16 additional episodes of Johan and Peewit)	25 July 2013
Die komplette neunte Staffel	26	25 July 2013
Collector's Edition (Amazon.de exclusive)	272	4 July 2013

=== Region 4 ===
Magna Home Entertainment has released various best-of volume collections on DVD.

- The Smurfs and the Magic Flute has been released, but in a new 'Original Collector's Edition' with new packaging released on 2 September 2011.
- The Smurfs – Time Travellers (3 Disc Set) was released on 5 November 2008.
- The Smurfs – Smurfette Collection (3 Disc Set) was released on 1 September 2009.
- The Smurfs – Papa Smurf Collection (3 Disc Set) was released on 4 November 2009.
- The Smurfs – Favourites Collection (6 Disc Box Set) was released on 29 June 2010.
- The Smurfs – Just Smurfy 1 (Box Set) (BONUS Figurine) was released on 3 November 2010.
- The Smurfs – Just Smurfy 2 (Box Set) (BONUS Figurine) was released on 3 November 2010.
- The Smurfs – Just Smurfy 3 (Box Set) (BONUS Figurine) was released on 1 December 2010.
- The Smurfs – Just Smurfy 4 (Box Set) (BONUS Figurine) was released on 2 March 2011.
- The Smurfs – Complete Season 1 (3 Disc Digipak) and The Smurfs – Complete Season 2 (3 Disc Digipak) were released on 24 August 2011.
- The Smurfs – Complete Season 3 (4 Disc Digipak) and The Smurfs – Complete Season 4 (4 Disc Digipak) were released on 5 October 2011.
- The Smurfs – Complete Season 5 (3 Disc Digipak) was released on 1 December 2011.
- The Smurfs – Complete Season 6 (5 Disc Digipak) was released on 4 January 2012.
- The Smurfs – Complete Season 7 (5 Disc Digipak), The Smurfs – Complete Season 8 (2 Disc Digipak) were released on 1 August 2013.
- The Smurfs – Complete Season 9 (3 Disc Digipak) was released on 14 August 2013.
- The Smurfs – Ultimate Collection 1: Limited Edition – Seasons 1–5 (18 Disc Box Set) released on 24 August 2011.
- The Smurfs – Ultimate Collection 2: Limited Edition – Seasons 6–9 (16 Disc Box Set) released on 2 November 2011.

== In popular culture ==
- The animated versions of Papa Smurf and Brainy Smurf were featured in Cartoon All-Stars to the Rescue. Hefty Smurf also makes a brief cameo in the beginning of the movie with the other Smurfs, his only line being, "Who smurfed the bell?" Smurfette is shown on the promotional poster and VHS cover artwork, but was not seen in the special. Harmony Smurf made a small cameo as the Smurfs comic book was flipping through pages.
- The Smurfs were often parodied in Robot Chicken where Danny Goldman reprises his role of Brainy Smurf, while Dan Milano voiced Papa Smurf and Seth Green voiced Gargamel.
- In the Harvey Birdman, Attorney at Law episode "Guitar Control", a tank can be seen destroying a Smurf house.
- In the 2001 Jake Gyllenhaal movie Donnie Darko, the titular character is seen on-screen giving an exposition regarding the origin of Smurfette to his two friends.

== 2021 reboot ==
In 2017, the Belgian companies IMPS and Dupuis Audiovisuel began production on an updated Smurfs series with CG animation, similar to Smurfs: The Lost Village. The series made its world premiere, on RTBF's OUFtivi channel in Belgium, on 18 April 2021. It premiered on Nickelodeon and Nicktoons in September 2021 in the U.S., with other international markets following soon.

== See also ==
- List of works produced by Hanna-Barbera Productions
- List of Hanna-Barbera characters
