= Knucklehead =

Knucklehead or Knuckleheads may refer to:

== Arts and entertainment ==
=== Fictional characters ===
- Knucklehead, the mascot of the band Five Finger Death Punch
- Knucklehead Smiff, ventriloquist dummy of Paul Winchell
- Knucklehead, from The Pee-wee Herman Show stage show and the Pee-wee's Playhouse television series
- Knucklehead, in Battle Angel Alita
- Knuckleheads, nickname of The Three Stooges

=== Film and television ===
- Knucklehead (2010 film), an American comedy
- Knucklehead (2015 film), an American drama
- Knuckleheads, 2012 Canadian animated TV series

=== Gaming ===
- Knuckleheads, a 2008 platform game by Nitrome
- Knuckle Heads, a 1992 arcade game

=== Music ===
- Knucklehead (band), a Canadian punk rock group
- "Knucklehead", B-side of the 1967 single "Soul Finger" by Bar-Kays
- "Knucklehead", a 1976 song by Grover Washington Jr.

== Other uses ==
- Knuckleheads Saloon, a music venue in Kansas City, Missouri, US
- Harley-Davidson Knucklehead engine

== See also ==
- Knucklehedz, member of hip hop collective Hit Squad
