= Pee-wee Herman =

American comedy character

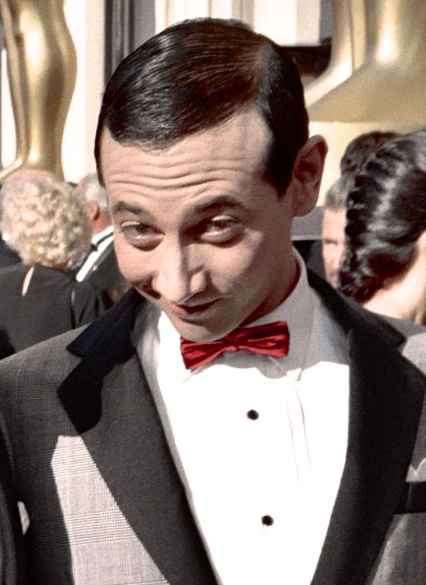
- Paul Reubens in character as Pee-wee Herman at the 1988 Academy Awards
- First appearance: Live performance: The Groundlings (1977); Screen: Cheech and Chong's Next Movie (1980)
- Last appearance: Live performance: 10th Annual TV Land Awards (2012); Screen: Pee-wee's Big Holiday (2016)
- Created by: Paul Reubens; Phil Hartman
- Portrayed by: Paul Reubens

In-universe information
- Gender: Male
- Occupation: Stand-up comedian, actor
- Family: Herman Herman (father, deceased); Honny Herman (mother); Hermione Herman (sister)

Pee-wee Herman is a comedy character created and portrayed by the American comedian Paul Reubens. He starred in films and television series during the 1980s. The childlike Pee-wee Herman character developed as a stage act that quickly led to an HBO special in 1981. As the stage performance gained further popularity, Reubens took the character to motion picture with Pee-wee's Big Adventure in 1985, toning down the adult innuendo for the appeal of children. This paved the way for Pee-wee's Playhouse, an Emmy Award-winning children's series that ran on CBS from 1986 to 1991. Another film, Big Top Pee-wee, was released in 1988.

Because of negative media attention following a scandal in 1991, Reubens decided to shelve his alter ego during the 1990s, but gradually resurrected it during the following decade. It was at that time that Reubens addressed plans to write a new Pee-wee film, Pee-wee's Playhouse: The Movie. In June 2007, Reubens appeared as Pee-wee Herman at the Spike TV's Guys' Choice Awards for the first time on television since 1992. After a lengthy hiatus, a third film, Pee-wee's Big Holiday, was released by Netflix in 2016 and was the last time Reubens portrayed the character on screen before his death in 2023.

== Origin ==
In the 1970s, Reubens joined the Los Angeles–based improvisational comedy team the Groundlings and remained a member for six years, working with Bob McClurg, John Paragon, Susan Barnes and Phil Hartman. Hartman and Reubens became close friends, often writing and working on material together. Reubens wrote sketches, developed his improvisational skills and, with Hartman, he developed the Pee-wee Herman character.

In 1977, The Groundlings staged a performance in which its members created characters one might see in a comedy club. Reubens decided to play a guy that everyone immediately knew would never make it as a comic, partly because Reubens could not remember jokes in real life – he had trouble remembering punch lines and could not properly piece information in sequential order. Pee-wee Herman was born that night, his distinctive guttural "Ha Ha", followed by a low, "Heh Heh Heh" laugh became the character's catch phrase, as did his insult comeback, "I know you are, but what am I?"

Pee-wee Herman's signature gray glen plaid suit was originally a custom-made suit that Reubens had borrowed from the Groundlings director, Gary Austin; the small red bow tie was given to him by an acquaintance. Pee-wee's later checkered clothing and persona were largely lifted from manic 1950s children's TV host Pinky Lee. Also incorporated into the look were short black hair, pale skin with red rouge and red lipstick.

The inspiration for the name came from a Pee-wee brand miniature harmonica and the surname of an energetic boy Reubens knew from his youth. Reubens thought the name Pee-wee Herman was a name that sounded too real to be made up, and like a real name a parent would give a child that they didn't really care about.

Sometime in 1979, Reubens debuted his character on the television show The Dating Game, appearing three times.

=== Character background and personality ===
Throughout his film and television programs, Pee-wee Herman's background has remained relatively ambiguous. During interviews, he has been portrayed as though he is a real life stand-up comedian who expanded his career by playing himself in his films and TV series. This is echoed by the fact that a star on the Hollywood Walk of Fame was awarded to Pee-wee Herman rather than Paul Reubens.

In both Pee-wee's Big Adventure and Pee-wee's Playhouse, the character surrounds himself with strange inventions and decorations and has no visible means of support, whereas Big Top Pee-wee depicts him as a farmer/inventor. During a July 1983 segment on Late Night with David Letterman, Pee-wee said he has a sister named Hermione who was a Girl Scout, his mother's name is Honny Herman, and his father's name is Herman Herman. He went on to say that everyone in his family has a first name that begins with an "H" except for him. This was again stated during a 1988 special which elaborated that Pee-wee was raised in Florida.

Pee-wee is commonly portrayed as an impatient and fun-loving child with dainty, effeminate mannerisms and quirky facial expressions. His age has never been explicitly stated; although, he once proclaimed on The Pee-wee Herman Show, "I'm the luckiest boy in the world." David Letterman once said of the character, "What makes me laugh ... is that it has the external structure of a bratty little precocious kid, but you know it's being controlled by the incubus – the manifestation of evil itself." While the character is typically cheerful and flamboyant, Pee-wee has indeed displayed an aggressive side, including his vicious pool battle with Francis in Pee-wee's Big Adventure. He also played vengeful tricks in the aforementioned film and occasionally threw childish tantrums on Pee-wee's Playhouse. Reubens said that he felt Pee-wee "resets" after each adventure, his experiences only changing him slightly, and compared him to Dorothy Gale at the end of The Wizard of Oz.

== 1980–1992 ==
=== The Pee-wee Herman Show ===
Paul Reubens auditioned for Saturday Night Live for the 1980–81 season but was not accepted into the cast. Instead, he started a stage show with the Herman character, which made one of his first appearances in the 1980 film Cheech & Chong's Next Movie. He first plays a rude receptionist in the film, spewing obscenities at police and being arrested. The character is later introduced as Pee-wee Herman, approaching the stage just before disputing with the film's title characters again. Shortly after the film, Reubens took Pee-wee to the real stage. Originally, Reubens imbued Pee-wee with sexuality that was later toned down as the character made the transition from raucous night club to children's television (though innuendo was still apparent, particularly between the Cowboy Curtis and Miss Yvonne characters). The stage show was popularized by HBO when The Pee-wee Herman Show aired in 1981.

The show featured the writing and acting of Groundlings alumni Phil Hartman and John Paragon, who would both reprise their characters on Pee-wee's Playhouse. The Pee-wee Herman Show played for five sellout months at The Roxy Theatre in Los Angeles, whereupon HBO filmed it and aired it as a special on September 11, 1981.

Following the success of The Pee-wee Herman Show, in the early and mid-1980s Reubens made several guest appearances on Late Night with David Letterman as Pee-wee Herman. These performances gave Pee-wee an even bigger following than he had with his HBO special. In 1983, Pee-wee Herman traveled the United States with The Pee-wee Herman Show, making highly publicized stops at the Guthrie Theatre in Minneapolis and Caroline's in New York City.

In 1984, Pee-wee Herman sold out New York City's Carnegie Hall. Reubens said his appearances on David Letterman's show made Pee-wee a star.

=== Pee-wee's Big Adventure ===
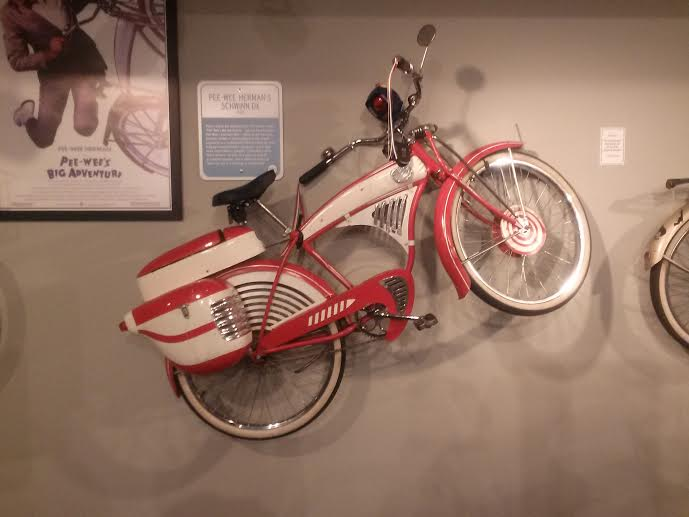
One of the prop bicycles used in "Pee-wee's Big Adventure". On display in the Bicycle exhibit at the Carnegie Science Center

While on the Warner Bros. lot, Reubens noticed that most of the people rode around on bicycles and asked when he would get his. Warner Bros. presented him with a refurbished 1940s Schwinn; Reubens then abandoned the Pee-wee Herman script he had been writing, which was to have been a retelling of Pollyanna. He began writing about Herman's love for his bike and his efforts to locate it once it was stolen. Hartman, Reubens and Michael Varhol co-wrote the script for Pee-wee's Big Adventure, basing the story loosely on Vittorio De Sica's The Bicycle Thief. The film was directed by Tim Burton, his feature film debut, and scored by Danny Elfman. It was released on August 9, 1985, and, while receiving mixed reviews, performed well at the box office and became a cult film. Reubens was the originator of the "Pee-wee dance" in the movie, and he had performed it publicly many times prior to making the film.

Pee-wee hosted the 198th episode of Saturday Night Live on November 23, 1985. Phil Hartman, who would become an SNL cast member the following year, was credited for writing the "Pee-wee Herman Thanksgiving Special" sketch and appeared as a pilgrim in it.

=== Pee-wee's Playhouse ===
The following year, Pee-wee (along with Hartman) found a home on the small screen with the Saturday morning children's program Pee-wee's Playhouse on the American CBS network for the next five years (Shirley Stoler, Johann Carlo, Gilbert Lewis and Roland Rodriguez appeared only for the first 13 episodes before their characters were dropped or recast). The show starred Pee-wee living in his wild and wacky Playhouse, full of talking chairs, animals, robots and other puppet and human characters. The show became a hit, and during its time on the air, Pee-wee's Playhouse garnered 15 Emmy Awards.

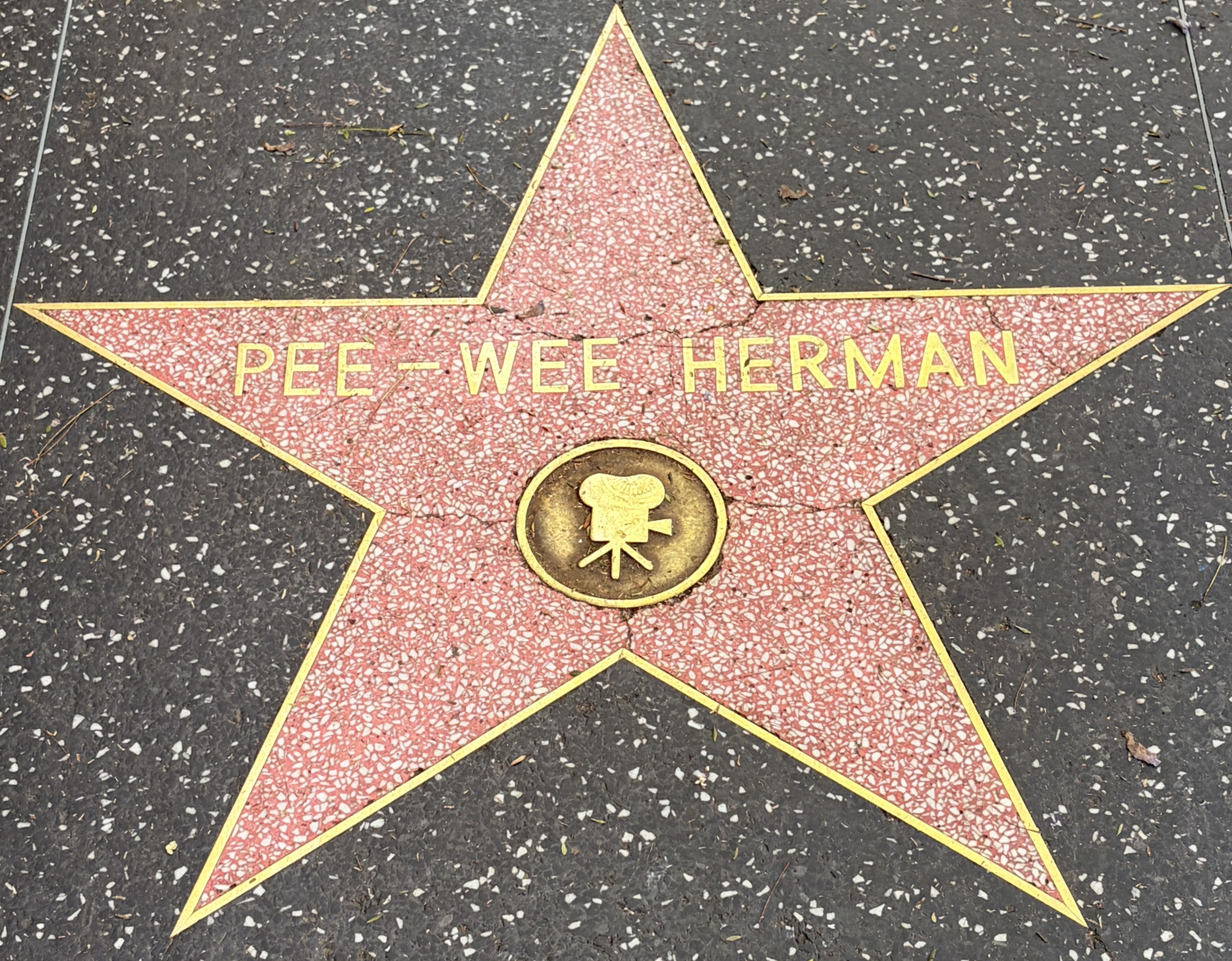
Hollywood Walk of Fame star

Pee-wee also became the first guest on The Late Show Starring Joan Rivers on its October 9, 1986, premiere. During this time, Pee-wee would also be in an anti-crack public service announcement (PSA) which was considered to be among the most classic anti-drug PSAs and pivotal to "The Thrill Can Kill" campaign. The following year, he made a cameo appearance in the film Back to the Beach. Reubens also filmed an insert for Sesame Street as Pee-wee, reciting his own version of the alphabet. In 1987, Pee-wee appeared on the hit primetime sitcom 227 alongside Marla Gibbs and Jackée Harry. The following year, a sequel to Pee-wee's Big Adventure, Big Top Pee-wee, was filmed. That same year "Pee-wee" was awarded a star on the Hollywood Walk of Fame and starred in Pee-wee's Playhouse Christmas Special. The program included various celebrity guests, including Oprah Winfrey, Cher, Whoopi Goldberg, Grace Jones, Little Richard and Joan Rivers among others.

=== Reubens' 1991 arrest ===
In July 1991, while visiting relatives, Reubens was arrested in Sarasota, Florida, for masturbating publicly in an adult theater. Detectives would periodically visit pornographic theaters and observe the audience, arresting those engaged in what these detectives considered indecent exposure. Three other men were also arrested that night on similar charges. Reubens' infamous mug shot, which did not depict the clean-cut look Reubens had shown for the last decade, shocked the public, and many thought that the show had been canceled due to the arrest. In reality, the show had been canceled in 1990 due to a combination of multiple complaints of overworked crew members and a feeling that the Pee-wee character had run its course, which ultimately resulted in Reubens deciding against a sixth season. However, due to its widespread popularity, CBS elected to continue airing repeats of Playhouse in its Saturday morning schedule. The arrest was widely covered, and both the character Pee-wee and Reubens became the subject of ridicule. CBS stopped airing Playhouse, Disney-MGM Studios suspended from its studio tour a video that showed Pee-wee explaining how voice-over tracks were made, and Toys "R" Us removed Pee-wee toys from its stores. However, Disney's Star Tours, which featured voicework from Reubens, remained unaltered.

Despite the negative publicity, many artists who knew Reubens, such as Cyndi Lauper, Annette Funicello, Zsa Zsa Gabor and Valeria Golino, spoke out in his support. Bill Cosby defended Reubens, saying "Whatever (Reubens has) done, this is being blown all out of proportion." Other people who knew Reubens, such as Playhouse's production designer Gary Panter, S. Epatha Merkerson and Big Top Pee-wee director Randal Kleiser, also spoke out against the way Reubens was being treated by the media. Reubens's fans also organized rallies of support after CBS canceled the scheduled reruns, with several dozens of "Pee-weeites" picketing in Los Angeles, New York and San Francisco. The general public also appeared to sympathize with Reubens – the TV newsmagazine A Current Affair received "tens of thousands" of responses to a Pee-wee telephone survey, with callers supporting Reubens with a 9-to-1 majority. He remained in a state of shock for weeks and was haunted by the arrest for several years, refusing to give interviews or appear on talk shows.

At the 1991 MTV Video Music Awards, Reubens made his first public appearance after the arrest. Taking the stage in costume as Pee-wee, he asked the audience, "Heard any good jokes lately?" and received a standing ovation. Reubens responded with, "Ha, that's so funny I forgot to laugh!" Pee-wee appeared once more in 1992, when he participated in a Grand Ole Opry tribute to Minnie Pearl. Reubens then avoided interviews and, according to a 1991 Rolling Stone article, had become weary of the character and wanted to explore new territory.

== 1999–2023 ==
Portrait of Pee-wee Herman by Jim McDermott

=== Appearances and television returns ===
During the filming of Mystery Men, Reubens appeared on The Tonight Show with Jay Leno in 1999 in one of his first out-of-character interviews. It was also on that interview that Reubens first announced plans to start writing a new Pee-wee movie. In a 2004 interview with Entertainment Weekly, Reubens also mentioned his hope that Hollywood has not seen the last of Pee-wee. Reubens later stated a strong possibility of a Pee-wee's Playhouse movie on an NPR interview with Terry Gross on November 29, 2004. A third Pee-wee movie was also suggested. During this time, Reubens stated both were actively being worked on.

In 1998, Fox Family aired reruns of Pee-wee's Playhouse. On July 10, 2006, Cartoon Network began airing Pee-wee's Playhouse during its Adult Swim lineup. The show's 45 original episodes were planned to air on the block Monday to Thursday at 11 p.m. ET starting on that date. Later on in August 2006, Adult Swim started airing Pee-wee's Playhouse at 12 a.m. ET.

In October 2006, Reubens made a public appearance, dressed as Pee-wee at Chiller Theatre Expo, an East Coast fan convention, with Pee-wee's Playhouse co-star, Lynne Marie Stewart. There he signed pictures and other memorabilia, and posed for photographs with fans.

At Spike TV's 2007 Guys' Choice Awards in June, Reubens appeared on TV as the Pee-wee Herman character for the first time since 1992. On August 5, 2007, at a showing of Pee-wee's Big Adventure in the Hollywood Forever Cemetery, Reubens made an appearance on stage before the show, bringing with him almost the entire cast of the film to uproarious applause and a standing ovation. E. G. Daily (Dotty), Judd Omen (Mickey), Diane Salinger (Simone), Daryl Keith Roach (Chuck, the bike shop owner), and Mark Holton (Francis) were all present.

On January 15, 2011, Reubens appeared on Saturday Night Live as Pee-wee in an extended and well-received segment depicting Andy Samberg and Pee-wee getting drunk, taking a ride on a mechanical bull, doing the tequila dance and ambushing Anderson Cooper in an alley way with a chair.

On February 1, 2012, Reubens appeared as Pee-wee on Bravo's Top Chef: Texas and served as guest judge. Part of the contestants' challenge was to ride a bike, similar to Pee-wee's, while gathering ingredients through San Antonio to prepare and serve a special lunch for Pee-wee at the Alamo. The use of The Alamo is a reference to Pee-wee's film, Pee-wee's Big Adventure, where his stolen bike is allegedly hidden. While taping the Top Chef episode on the Alamo complex, author and Alamo spokesman Tony J. Caridi led Reubens on a guided tour of the basement on the Alamo grounds, which is used to store gift shop merchandise.

On November 26, 2021, Reubens appeared as Pee-wee on KCRW, hosting the Pee-wee Herman Radio Hour, produced on a budget of $10,000. The program was billed as being created last-minute when Pee-wee wrote a letter to KCRW about hosting the station, being finalized after his fans berated the station to create it. In actuality, the special was three years in the making, first conceptualized when a staff member of KCRW read an interview with Reubens, mentioning that he enjoyed the station, leading to a meeting with Reubens and Gary Scott, the KCRW program director at the time. Eventually, this led to Jesse Thorn producing the program and meeting with Reubens about the show. Reubens explained that he has wanted ways to portray Pee-wee without having to act on screen. The program featured Jack White and Charo, as well as characters from Pee-wee's Playhouse, such as Chairry (played by Alison Mork), Conky (played by Josh Myers), Magic Screen, and Miss Yvonne (played by Lynne Marie Stewart). Thorn described Reuben's eagerness to do the program: "Paul had a specific vision, and the vision was driven by that idea of being a classic FM radio DJ, like being Sly Stone on KSOL in San Francisco before he was a singer.” This was Reuben's last ever appearance as Pee-wee before his death in 2023.

=== Proposed films ===
==== Pee-wee's Playhouse: The Movie ====
Pee-wee's Playhouse: The Movie is a proposed film allegedly greenlighted by Paramount Pictures. Reubens's third scripted movie, written at the same time as his adult-oriented Pee-wee script, was announced in late summer 2006. He first announced he had finished the script on Late Show with David Letterman, and later revealed further details to Time magazine reporter Dennis Van Tine. Filming was expected to start in early 2007.

According to Reubens, the story will focus on the characters from the television show finally leaving the playhouse and venturing off into Puppetland and beyond (the playhouse characters had rarely left their home in the TV series). The characters from the playhouse will be on an epic adventure to look for a missing character from the playhouse. Reubens stated this will be a "road" movie. Reubens said that, although he feels confident that he can still portray Pee-wee himself, he would optionally cast Johnny Depp if needed. He said "My second option is to have Johnny Depp play Pee-wee." He said he spoke to Depp himself and that the actor asked for time to think about it.

During the 2011 Comic-Con in San Diego, Reubens told MTV that he hoped to have Justin Bieber make a cameo appearance toward the end of the movie. He also stated that filming of the movie had not started yet, but hoped to begin filming in the next couple of months.

==== The Pee-wee Herman Story ====
Years before working on his Playhouse film script, Reubens had written a script for "the dark Pee-wee film", but "not really very dark", entitled The Pee-wee Herman Story. At a Groundlings reunion in 1999, Reubens even joked about the rating of the movie being "probably PG-13 or even R" but in a 2007 MTV interview stated that this was not the case. He called it a "Valley of the Dolls Pee-wee" because "it has things certainly inspired by, if not outright lifted from, that movie". Reubens described the film's plot to MTV:

It's basically the story of Pee-wee Herman becoming famous as a singer. He has a hit single and gets brought out to Hollywood to make musical movies, kind of like they did with Elvis. It all kind of goes downhill from there for Pee-wee. He turns into a monster. He does everything wrong and becomes a big jerk.

It was because of the adult situations of this script that Reubens sat down and started writing the Playhouse movie script. At first, Reubens was going to do the adult Pee-wee movie first, but within a few months, Reubens announced that it was very likely that the Playhouse movie would be made first.

A third idea came about to make a reality-based Pee-wee film like those in the 1980s. In 2010, Reubens announced he is working on making this version with Judd Apatow, who wrote and directed the films Knocked Up and The 40-Year-Old Virgin.

In 2013, Reubens reported that Pee-Wee will soon return with a new film which he plans to start shooting in 2014. While promoting his voice role in The Smurfs 2, Reubens told the Los Angeles Times on the long-gestating project, saying the film has funding, a finished script, and a director lined up. Reubens was said to be developing a new TV show, which he commented would potentially be an update on the popular Pee-wee's Playhouse. He added that a more detailed announcement was "imminent". Reubens said, "Short of something unforeseen like the studio going out of business, I think it's very likely both these projects will happen next year." In 2014, it was announced that the film would be on Netflix.

=== The Pee-wee Herman Show revival ===
Paul Reubens confirmed in a January 2009 interview with Swindle magazine that there are indeed negotiations under way for the Pee-wee Herman stage show to return.

In late 2009, Reubens began promoting his new live stage show. He appeared in character as Pee-wee on late night programs including Jimmy Kimmel Live!, The Jay Leno Show, and The Tonight Show with Conan O'Brien. Pee-wee would also return for a cameo on the penultimate episode of The Tonight Show with Conan O'Brien as host and during O'Brien's stop at Radio City Music Hall in New York City for The Legally Prohibited from Being Funny on Television Tour.

Original plans for a November 2009 stage debut were scrapped when demand for tickets prompted a move to a larger theater. The Pee-wee Herman Stage Show: The Return opened on January 12, 2010, at Club Nokia in Los Angeles for a limited four-week schedule. The show moved to Broadway in New York at the Stephen Sondheim Theatre on November 11, 2010. Much like the original stage show, the new production revolved around Pee-wee's desire to fly. It had 11 actors, 20 puppets and marked the show's first production since 1982. It employed many of the same set artists and the musical composer from Pee-wee's original stage show as well as some of the original cast members, including Lynne Stewart as Miss Yvonne, John Moody as Mailman Mike and John Paragon as Jambi the Genie. Reubens cited his desire to make a film version of Pee-wee's Playhouse and expressed a desire to "introduce Pee-wee to the new generation that didn't know about it".

Pee-wee's 2010 stage show received positive reviews from various Los Angeles–based publications, including the Orange County Register, Los Angeles Times and The Hollywood Reporter.

To promote his Broadway show, Pee-wee Herman guest starred on the November 1, 2010, edition of WWE Raw at the Nassau Coliseum. During the program, he participated in backstage antics and had an in-ring confrontation with The Miz and Alex Riley. Pee-wee won a Slammy Award for Guest Star Shining Moment of the Year on December 13, 2010, for his appearance. Pee-wee Herman returned to WWE at WrestleMania XXVII in a segment with The Rock and Gene Okerlund in which he admitted to being John Cena's number one fan.

=== Pee-wee's Big Holiday ===
After Reubens started giving interviews again after his 1991 arrest, he talked about the two scripts he had written for future Pee-wee Herman films. Reubens once called his first script The Pee-wee Herman Story, describing it as a black comedy. He also referred to the script as "dark Pee-wee" or "adult Pee-wee", with the plot involving Pee-wee becoming famous as a singer after making a hit single and moving to Hollywood, where "he does everything wrong and becomes a big jerk". Reubens further explained the film has many "Valley of the Dolls moments". Reubens thought this script would be the first one to start production, but in 2006 Reubens announced he was to start filming his second script in 2007.

The second film, a family friendly adventure, is called Pee-wee's Playhouse: The Movie by Reubens, and follows Pee-wee and his Playhouse friends on a road-trip adventure, meaning that they would leave the house for the first time and go out into "Puppetland". All of the original characters of the show, live-action and puppets, are included in Reubens' script. The story happens in a fantasy land that would be reminiscent of H.R. Pufnstuf and The Wonderful Wizard of Oz. In January 2009, Reubens told Gary Panter that the rejected first script of Pee-wee's Big Adventure (which they co-wrote) could have a movie deal very soon, and that it would be "90 minutes of incredible beauty". In December 2009, while in character, Reubens said this film is "already done, the script is already fully written; It's ready to shoot." Most of the film will take place in Puppetland and claymation might be used.

Reubens said one of the two films opens in prison. He also said that using CGI for "updating" the puppets' looks could be an option, but it all depended on the budget the films would have. Reubens once mentioned the possibility of doing one of the two as an animated film along the lines of The Polar Express, which uses performance capture technology, incorporating the movements of live actors into animated characters. Reubens approached Pee-wee's Big Adventure director Tim Burton with one of the scripts and talked to Johnny Depp about the possibility of having him portray Pee-wee, but they both declined.

In June 2010, it was announced that Paul Reubens was working with Judd Apatow on a new Pee-wee Herman feature film set up at Universal Pictures, with Reubens and Paul Rust set to write the script. In an October 2014, interview with Rolling Stone, Reubens gave an update on the status of the film, saying: "It's been months and months of being right on the verge of being announced…I thought something was going to go public yesterday, actually, and that you'd be the first person I'd be talking about this with. But I'm thinking there will be something made public very soon. It's going to get made shortly after the new year. I wish I could tell you about it right now, because…I mean, it's amazing. It's going to be amazing. I think it first got leaked four years ago or so that the movie was going to be made, and ever since then it's just been stalling and stalling. So I'm really ready for this to happen. But I'm not kidding: It's very imminent."

In a November 2014, interview with The A.V. Club, Reubens explained why the film took so long to be made, saying: "I think part of what happened with this project is it got leaked probably a year and a half or two years before we really wanted anyone to know about it. I was doing a Q&A somewhere, and I said I was writing a movie with a guy named Paul Rust, and the next day a journalist called my manager and said, "Paul Rust is someone very associated with Judd Apatow, can you confirm Judd Apatow is involved in the project?" The whole thing got leaked and we had just started. We didn't have a script yet or anything, so the script took a year and – I don't really know the answer. I think two years of it was like premature information out there, and then the last two years it's just been very, very slow to get the right people involved, and we now have such an amazing company involved, and that's the really big announcement that hasn't been made yet."

On December 22, 2014, it was announced that the film would premiere exclusively on Netflix. On February 24, 2015, Netflix announced the film would be titled Pee-wee's Big Holiday with Apatow and Reubens producing the film, John Lee directing, and Reubens and Paul Rust writing the screenplay. On March 11, 2015, Tara Buck joined the cast of the film. Principal photography began on March 16, 2015. On April 8, 2015, Joe Manganiello joined the cast. On April 19, 2015, Jessica Pohly was cast in the film.

The film released on March 18, 2016 on Netflix to positive reception. The film was the last time Reubens portrayed the character on screen before his death in 2023.

== Honors ==
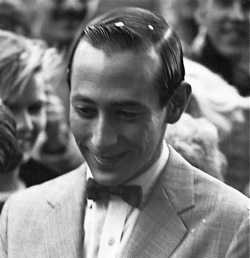
Reubens in 1985 receiving Harvard Lampoon's Elmer Award for lifetime achievement in comedy

The Pee-wee Herman character has received various honors, particularly during his peak fame in the late 1980s.

During the original run of Pee-wee's Playhouse, the series garnered 22 Emmy Awards nominations. As pictured, in 1985 he received Harvard Lampoon's Elmer Award for lifetime achievement in comedy. In 1988, Pee-wee Herman was awarded a star on the Hollywood Walk of Fame; under the category of motion pictures, it can be found at 6562 Hollywood Blvd. At the 2012 TV Land Awards, he won the Pop Culture award.

== In popular culture ==
In the film Flight of the Navigator (1986), directed by Randal Kleiser, who would later direct Big Top Pee-wee, Pee-wee's characteristic laugh is uttered several times by the Trimaxian Drone (Max, voiced by Reubens), after he "contracted" emotions and 1980s knowledge from David. This persona, speaking in altered pitch similar to Pee-wee's, persists for the rest of the movie, a stark contrast to Max's original HAL 9000-esque tone.

In the film Overboard (1987), the Joey Proffitt character, played by Jeffrey Wiseman, frequently talked in Pee-wee's voice and did his characteristic laugh several times during the film. Although it wasn't intended in the original script, since the film's director, Garry Marshall allowed his cast to improvise, Wiseman was allowed to speak in Pee-wee's voice.

Shortly after Reubens's 1991 arrest, Jim Carrey impersonated Pee-wee Herman on the FOX sketch comedy series In Living Color. Later, rapper Eminem imitated Herman in the song "Just Lose It", copying his trademark laugh and even dressing as the character in the music video. Eminem later also mentioned Herman in "Ass Like That".

While the Pee-wee Herman character had not originally been intended for a child audience, during the mid-1980s Reubens started forming him into the best role model he possibly could, making of his TV program a morally positive show that cared about issues like racial diversity, the four food groups, and the dangers of making prank calls, but in a manner not overly preachy. Reubens was also careful about what should be associated with Pee-wee. Being a heavy smoker, he went to great lengths never to be photographed with a cigarette in his mouth. He even refused to endorse candy bars and other kinds of junk food, while trying to develop his own sugar-free cereal, "Pee-Wee Chow", a product that would have been produced by Ralston Purina; Pee-Wee Chow never made it to market after failing a blind test.

During this time, he began successfully building a Pee-wee franchise with toys, clothes, and other items, generating more than $25 million at its peak in 1989. Reubens also published a book as Pee-wee, titled Travels with Pee-wee (1989).

== Filmography ==
Year	Title	Notes
1979	The Dating Game	
1980	Cheech and Chong's Next Movie	
1981	The Pee-wee Herman Show	TV special
1982	Madame's Place	Episode #1.34
1982	Lily for President	
1984	Cheeseball Presents	TV movie
1984	"Reggae Christmas"	Bryan Adams music video
1985	Saturday Night Live	Host; Episode: "Pee-wee Herman/Queen Ida & The Bon Temps Zydeco Band"
1985	Pee-wee's Big Adventure	
1985	Rock 'n' Wrestling Saturday Spectacular	
1985	42nd Golden Globe Awards	
1986–1990	Pee-wee's Playhouse	Appeared in every episode
1987	Back to the Beach	
1987	It's Howdy Doody Time	
1987	227	Episode: "Toyland"
1987	Dolly	Episode #1.1
1988	1988 Academy Awards	Presenter of the award for Best Live Action Short Film
1988	Big Top Pee-wee	Nominated – Kid's Choice Award for Favorite Movie Actor
1988	Sesame Street	Episode: "Put Down the Duckie"
1988	Moonwalker	
1988	Pee-wee's Playhouse Christmas Special	Nominated – Primetime Emmy Award for Outstanding Art Direction for a Variety or Music Program
1991	1991 MTV Video Music Awards	Opened the show
2007	2007 Spike Guys' Choice Awards	
2010	The Tonight Show with Conan O'Brien	Episodes: #1.113, #1.144
2010	Pee-wee Gets an iPad!	Funny or Die short
2010	The Tonight Show with Jay Leno	Episode #18.105
2010	Pee-wee Goes to Sturgis	
2010	WWE Raw	Episode: "2010 Slammy Awards"
2010	Saturday Night Live	Episode: "Gwyneth Paltrow/Cee Lo Green"
2010–2011	Late Night with Jimmy Fallon	Episodes: #1.330, #1.373, #1.408
2011	The Pee-wee Herman Show on Broadway	TV movie Nominated – Primetime Emmy Award for Outstanding Variety, Music, or Comedy Special
2011	Conan	Episode: "Everybody Wang But Don't Chung Tonight"
2011	WrestleMania XXVII	
2012	Top Chef	Episode: "Bike, Borrow & Steal"
2012	2012 TV Land Awards	Winner of Pop Culture Award
2016	Pee-wee's Big Holiday	A Netflix Original Film (final film role)
