= Pee-wee's Big Adventure =

1985 film by Tim Burton

- Theatrical release poster
- Directed by: Tim Burton
- Written by: Phil Hartman; Paul Reubens; Michael Varhol
- Produced by: Robert Shapiro; William E. McEuen; Richard Gilbert Abramson
- Starring: Paul Reubens; Elizabeth Daily; Mark Holton; Diane Salinger; Judd Omen
- Cinematography: Victor J. Kemper
- Edited by: Billy Weber
- Music by: Danny Elfman
- Production companies: Aspen Film Society; Robert Shapiro Productions; Pee-wee Pictures
- Distributed by: Warner Bros.
- Release dates: July 26, 1985 (Mann's Chinese Theatre); August 9, 1985 (United States)
- Running time: 91 minutes
- Country: United States
- Language: English
- Budget: $7 million
- Box office: $40.9 million (domestic)

Pee-wee's Big Adventure is a 1985 American adventure comedy film directed by Tim Burton in his feature-film directorial debut. The film stars Paul Reubens as Pee-wee Herman, along with Elizabeth Daily, Mark Holton, Diane Salinger and Judd Omen. The screenplay, written by Reubens with Phil Hartman and Michael Varhol, tells the story of Pee-wee's search for his stolen bicycle.

Following the success of The Pee-wee Herman Show in 1981, Reubens was hired by the Warner Bros. film studio and began writing the script for Pee-wee's Big Adventure. Impressed with Burton's work on the short film Frankenweenie (1984), the producers and Reubens hired him to direct. Filming took place in California and Texas. The film was scored by Danny Elfman, marking his first among many collaborations with Burton.

Pee-wee's Big Adventure was theatrically released on August 9, 1985, by Warner Bros., grossing over $40 million in North America. It became a cult film and continued to accumulate positive feedback. It was nominated for a Young Artist Award for Best Family Motion Picture (Comedy or Musical) and was followed by two standalone sequels: Big Top Pee-wee (1988) and Pee-wee's Big Holiday (2016). Its financial success, followed by Burton's equally successful Beetlejuice in 1988, prompted Warner Bros. to hire Burton to direct the 1989 film Batman.

== Plot ==
Pee-wee Herman, a childlike man in a grey suit with a red bow-tie, has a cherished, heavily accessorized bicycle. His neighbor and enemy, Francis Buxton, wants the bicycle and offers to buy it. Pee-wee refuses; as he rides off, Francis warns him he'll be sorry for turning down his offer.

Dottie is an employee at the local bike shop who has a crush on Pee-wee, but he does not reciprocate. As Pee-wee goes on a shopping spree, his bike is stolen, but the police are not overly concerned with the theft. Pee-wee assumes Francis took it and confronts him, but Francis' father convinces Pee-wee that Francis was not responsible. Pee-wee offers a $10,000 reward for the bike. Francis, who did indeed pay to have someone steal the bike, is disturbed by Pee-wee's relentlessness and pays to have the bike sent away. That evening, Pee-wee holds an unsuccessful evidentiary meeting of friends and neighbors to find the bike, and rejects Dottie's offer of help. He then visits a phony psychic who misleads Pee-wee into believing his bike is in the basement of the Alamo Mission in San Antonio. In haste he leaves his wallet behind.

Pee-wee hitchhikes to Texas, getting rides from a fugitive convict named Mickey, and from Large Marge, the ghost of a truck driver. At a truck stop, Pee-wee finds his wallet is missing, and pays for his meal by washing dishes. He befriends Simone, a waitress who dreams of visiting Paris. As they watch the sunrise from within a roadside dinosaur statue, he encourages her to follow her dreams, but Simone tells him about her boyfriend, Andy, who disapproves. Andy appears and tries to attack Pee-wee, who escapes onto a moving train. Pee-wee arrives at the Alamo, but learns at the end of a guided tour that the building does not have a basement.

At a bus station, Pee-wee encounters Simone, who tells him she broke up with Andy and is on her way to Paris. She tells Pee-wee not to give up searching for his bike. Pee-wee calls Dottie and apologizes for his behavior. Andy spots Pee-wee and resumes chasing him. Pee-wee evades Andy at a rodeo by disguising himself as a bull rider. He is forced to ride a bull, and gets knocked out before the bull pursues Andy. He visits a biker bar to make a phone call, and a biker gang threatens to kill him after he accidentally knocks over their motorcycles. He wins them over by dancing to the song "Tequila" in a pair of platform shoes, and they give him a motorcycle for his journey, which he crashes immediately.

He awakens in a hospital and sees on television that his bike is being used as a prop in a film. Pee-wee sneaks into Warner Bros. Studios in Burbank and grabs the bike. Security guards chase him across the studio lot and through several active sets before he escapes. Pee-wee then discovers a burning pet shop and rescues the animals. The firefighters declare Pee-wee a hero, but the police arrest Pee-wee for his intrusion at the studio. They return Pee-wee to the studio to face Warner Bros. president Terry Hawthorne. After Pee-wee pleads his case that the bike belongs to him, Hawthorne decides to drop the charges and return Pee-wee's bike in exchange for the rights to adapt his story into a film starring James Brolin as "P.W. Herman" and Morgan Fairchild as Dottie. In the film, presented as a James Bond parody, the characters must retrieve their stolen motorbike – which contains an important microfilm – from the Soviets. Pee-wee has a cameo role as a hotel bellhop, though his voice has been dubbed.

Seeing the film at a drive-in theater, Pee-wee gives refreshments to the different people he met along his journey. He also encounters Francis, who tells reporters that he taught Pee-wee how to ride. Francis claims to be knowledgeable about Pee-wee's bike, but sets off one of the bicycle's gadgets, catapulting himself into the air. Ultimately, Pee-wee decides to depart with Dottie, claiming to have already "lived" the adventure on screen.

== Cast ==
- Paul Reubens as Pee-wee Herman, an eccentric man-child whose bike was stolen.
- Elizabeth Daily as Dottie, a bike shop employee who is Pee-wee's friend and has a crush on him.
- Mark Holton as Francis, a spoiled man-child who is Pee-wee's enemy and neighbor.
- Diane Salinger as Simone, a tourist stop waitress who dreams of visiting France.
- Judd Omen as Mickey, an escaped convict who claims he was incarcerated for cutting a tag off a mattress.

Selected supporting players, in order of appearance

- Monte Landis as Mario, the owner of a magic shop where Pee-wee purchases several tricks and gadgets that become plot devices.
- Starletta DuPois as Sgt. Hunter
- Prof. Toru Tanaka as the butler of the Buxton family.
- Ed Herlihy as Mr. Buxton, the father of Francis.
- Ralph Seymour as Francis' Accomplice, who steals Pee-wee's bike and sells it to Warner Bros. Studios.
- Lou Cutell as Amazing Larry, a magician friend of Mario.
- Erica Yohn as Madam Ruby, a con artist who runs a "psychic" operation.
- Alice Nunn as Large Marge, a ghostly truck driver.
- Jon Harris as Andy, Simone's gigantic, dimwitted, short-tempered boyfriend.
- Carmen Filpi as Hobo Jack, whom Pee-wee meets on a train.
- Jan Hooks as Tina, the Alamo tour guide.
- Luis Contreras as Biker No. 2
- Cassandra Peterson as Biker Mama, of Satan's Helpers.
- Jason Hervey as Kevin Morton, a bratty child star.
- John Paragon as Movie Lot Actor
- Lynne Stewart as Mother Superior, in Kevin Morton's film.
- Phil Hartman as Reporter
- Michael Varhol as Photographer
- Patrick Cranshaw as Hobo
- Sunshine Parker as Hobo

Special appearances

- James Brolin as "P.W."
- Morgan Fairchild as "Dottie"
- Tony Bill as Terry Hawthorne, the president of Warner Bros. Studios.
- Twisted Sister

Director Tim Burton has an uncredited cameo appearance as the street thug who confronts Pee-wee in a rainy back alley. Veteran comedy star Milton Berle also has an uncredited cameo, entering the Warner Bros. lot and telling jokes to his entourage as Pee-wee sneaks in with them.

== Production ==
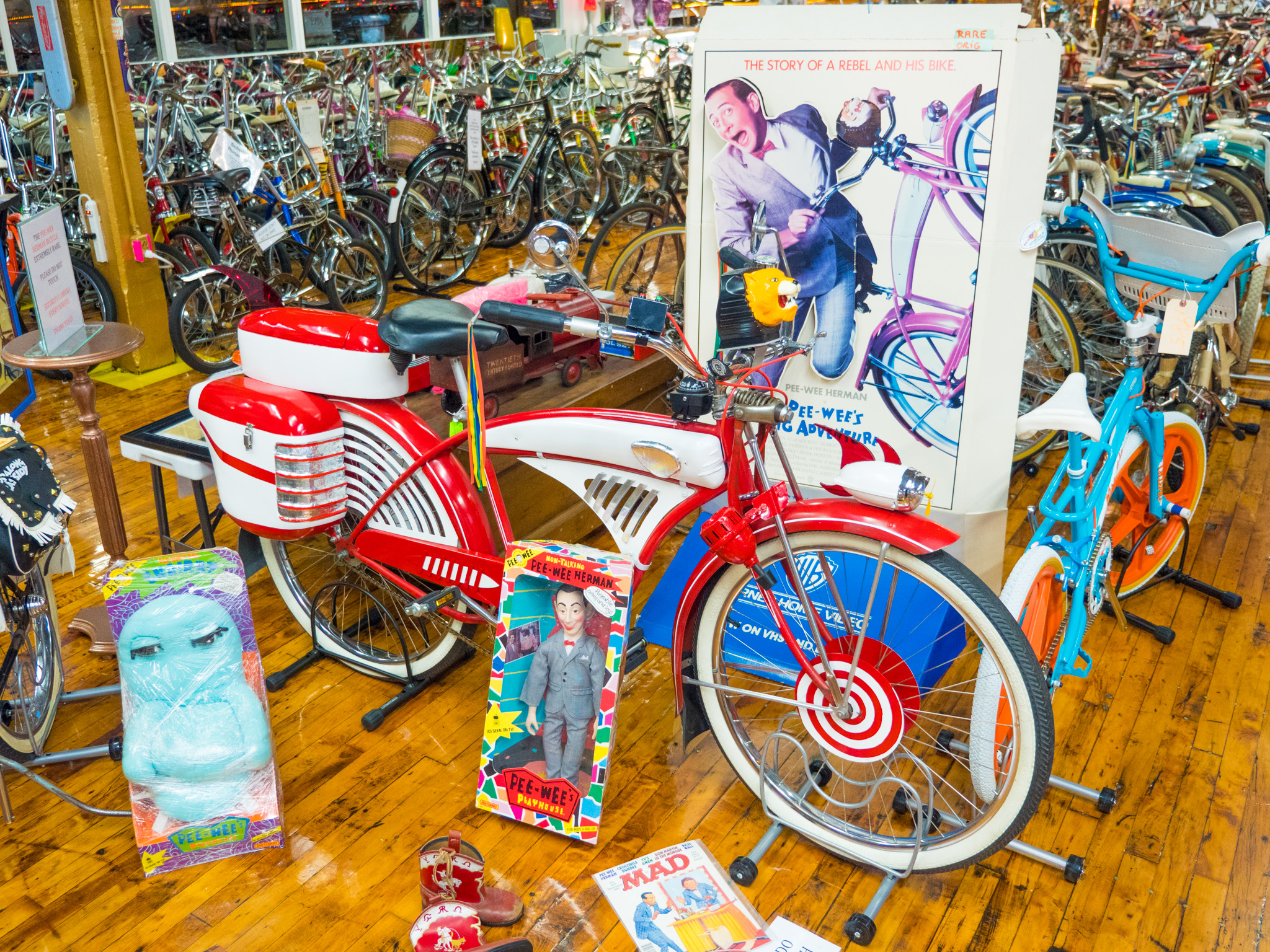
One of the prop bicycles used in the film on display at Bicycle Heaven

After a failed audition for Saturday Night Live in 1980, Paul Reubens developed The Pee-wee Herman Show for the Groundlings sketch comedy theater in Los Angeles, which led to an HBO special in 1981 and several appearances on Late Night with David Letterman. Steve Martin introduced his manager Bill McEuen to Reubens, who subsequently signed him on as a client and convinced him to go on an American tour. Reubens's tour of 22 cities was billed as The Pee-wee Herman Party and included sold-out shows at New York's Carnegie Hall and Los Angeles's Universal Amphitheater, where Warner Bros. executives greenlit a full-length Pee-wee Herman film.

Reubens's original concept was a remake of Pollyanna (1960), his favorite film, with Pee-wee Herman in the Hayley Mills role. While writing the script, he noticed that many at Warner Bros. rode bicycles around the backlot and requested one of his own. This inspired him to start a new script.

After a tentative screenplay had been written, according to producer Richard Gilbert Abramson, Warner Bros. had approved a director for the film but it was a choice that neither he, McEuen or Reubens felt was appropriate for the project. Taking inspiration from Sylvester Stallone, who refused to cede creative control to studios, Reubens turned down Warner Bros.'s choice for the director, and the studio then told him to find someone "approvable, available, and affordable" within a week.

Having left Walt Disney Productions, and with Frankenweenie (1984) receiving positive reviews within film studios, Tim Burton was seeking a full-length film to direct. When Reubens and the producers of Pee-wee's Big Adventure saw Burton's work on Frankenweenie, they decided to hire him. Burton felt that he connected with Reubens's personality and the humor of the Pee-wee Herman Show.

Reubens had heard about Burton at a party the same night that he had gotten permission from the studio to get an extension on his director search. "I screened Frankenweenie and I spoke to Shelley Duvall, who was a friend of mine who was in (the film)," Reubens explained. "I knew Tim was the director about 15 seconds into Frankenweenie, like the second or third shot of it. I was looking at the wallpaper in this bedroom and the lighting and just going, 'This is the guy who has style and understands art direction.' Those were two really important things for me and my baby, I guess, and you know it just happened to luckily all work out."

After hiring Burton, Reubens, Phil Hartman and Michael Varhol revised the script. They read Syd Field's 1979 book Screenplay and adhered to the book's screenwriting advice: "It's a 90-minute film, it's a 90-page script," Reubens explained. "On page 30 I lose my bike, on page 60 I find it. It's literally exactly what they said to do in the book [...] There should be like a MacGuffin kind of a thing, something you're looking for, and I was like, 'Okay, my bike.'" The film has been described as a "parody" or "farce version" of the 1948 Italian classic Bicycle Thieves.

=== Casting ===
The film features several of Reubens' fellow cast members from the improvisational comedy troupe the Groundlings who had previously appeared in The Pee-wee Herman Show, namely Phil Hartman, Lynne Marie Stewart, John Paragon and John Moody. Jan Hooks was also a fellow Groundling, and both she and Hartman would go on to become cast members of Saturday Night Live in 1986.

The filmmakers initially wanted Louie Anderson, a rising stand-up comedian at the time, for the role of Francis. Actor Mark Holton later theorized that his own shorter stature and affordability influenced the decision to cast him in the role.

Diane Salinger had been an actual waitress as a teenager. While she hailed from Delaware, she adopted a southern accent for the role of Simone, which she developed just minutes before her audition. After being cast, Salinger, a Shakespearean-trained actress, almost rejected the role, due to a scene in the script that involved Pee-wee's dog, Spec, licking its behind and then Pee-wee's mouth. The scene did not make it into the finished film.

Twisted Sister appeared in the film following an earlier encounter between frontman Dee Snider and Reubens at an MTV New Year's Eve party, where the two expressed mutual admiration for each other. In early 1985, the band was visiting California in preparation for several shows at the Long Beach Arena when Reubens contacted Snider about the band possibly doing a cameo in the film during the chase scene, which he envisioned passing through a Twisted Sister video shoot. While Snider initially suggested using the songs "We're Not Gonna Take It" or "I Wanna Rock" for the sequence, much to his delight, Reubens specifically requested "Burn in Hell".

Hartman, Stewart and Paragon would also later appear on Reubens' TV series Pee-wee's Playhouse. Stewart would also appear in the films Big Top Pee-wee (1988) and Pee-wee's Big Holiday (2016), as well as the 2010 Broadway revival of The Pee-wee Herman Show. Salinger would also appear in Pee-wee's Big Holiday.

=== Filming ===
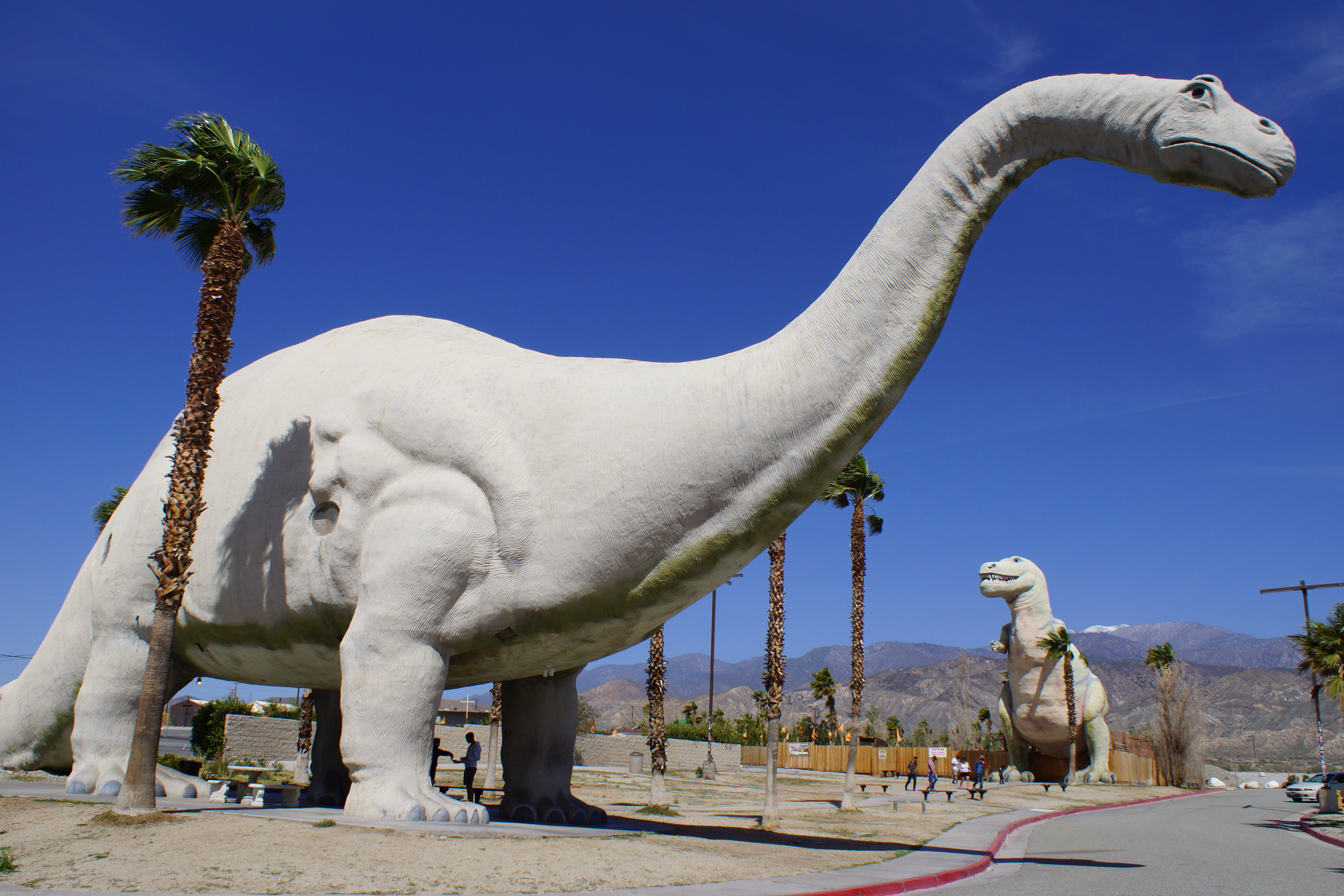
In the film, Pee-wee is dropped off by Large Marge at the Wheel Inn Restaurant, known for its Cabazon Dinosaurs roadside attraction.

Filming began in January 1985 and adhered largely to the script, with little improvisation or extra shooting required. However, Burton and Reubens clashed with Warner Bros. studio executives over the shooting schedule. Filming locations included Glendale, Pomona, Santa Clarita, Santa Monica (Third Street Promenade), Burbank, Cabazon— at the Wheel Inn Restaurant (1958–2013) and Cabazon Dinosaurs— and Port Hueneme in California, as well as San Antonio, Texas. While the exterior of the Alamo was real, interior shots were filmed at the Mission San Fernando Rey de España in Mission Hills, Los Angeles. While there wasn't a basement at the Alamo during filming, there now are two. Reubens later toured the basement of the Alamo in 2011 while serving as a guest judge on Top Chef: Texas.

Fourteen vintage-style Schwinn DX bikes, dating from 1946 to 1953, were commissioned and built for the film, customized to the specifications of Reubens, Burton and production designer David Snyder, rigged with special effects by prop master Steven Levine. In 2025, the Alamo announced they had officially acquired one of the original, screen-used stunt bikes from the film, and that it would be on permanent display at the Alamo Visitor Center and Museum. In August 2025, Reubens' own copy of the bike was donated to the Academy Museum of Motion Pictures in Hollywood, which he had bequeathed to them as part of his legal trust.

Burton hired CalArts classmate Rick Heinrichs for scenes involving stop-motion animation. Large Marge's claymation transformation was created by the Chiodo Brothers. All three had previously worked together on Burton's short film Vincent (1982).

== Music ==
Pee-wee's Big Adventure marked the beginning of a long working relationship between Tim Burton and composer Danny Elfman, who would go on to collaborate on several successful films. Elfman's score draws inspiration from film composers Nino Rota and Bernard Herrmann, (Note: "As for the Herrmann touch, Elfman was able to draw from that reservoir in some of the film's more inspired dream sequences. 'There was some strange and wonderful music of Herrmann's that influenced me, in particular, Jason and the Argonauts, The Seventh Voyage of Sinbad, and Mysterious Island.'") but was also influenced by cartoon music.

The soundtrack was first issued by Varèse Sarabande in 1988, which included re-recorded cues from the film score combined with cues from another Elfman-scored film, Back to School (1986). Though the album did not have a standalone release, both the original score sessions and re-recordings were issued by Warner Bros. Records as part of The Danny Elfman & Tim Burton 25th Anniversary Music Box, which also included additional cues and alternate takes.

== Release and reception ==
Pee-wee's Big Adventure premiered at Grauman's Chinese Theatre on July 26, 1985. Burton, Reubens, Daily and Holton were in attendance, and it was the first such event to be aired live on MTV. The premiere was accompanied by a carnival-themed party coordinated by Warner Bros. and attended by celebrities such as Alice Cooper, David Lee Roth, and Eddie Murphy. The film was wide released on August 9 in the United States in 829 theaters, accumulating $4,545,847 over its opening weekend and going on to gross $40,940,662 domestically.

=== Contemporary appraisal ===
Pee-wee's Big Adventure received generally positive reviews on its release before eventually becoming a cult film. Review aggregator website Rotten Tomatoes reports that 78% of 116 critics gave it a positive review. The critical consensus reads: "Pee-Wee's Big Adventure brings Paul Reubens' famous character to the big screen intact, along with enough inspired silliness to dazzle children of all ages." Metacritic assigned the film a weighted average score of 47 out of 100 based on 14 critics, indicating "mixed or average reviews".

In a review for the Los Angeles Times, Michael Wilmington wrote, "The wrong crowd will find these antics infantile and offensive. The right one will have a howling good time." David Ansen of Newsweek described the film as "Mattel Surrealism, a toy-store fantasia in primary colors and '50s decor. Whoever proposed teaming up Pee-wee (a.k.a. Paul Reubens) with 26-year-old director Tim Burton knew what they were doing [...] Together they've conspired to make a true original— a live-action cartoon brash enough to appeal to little kids and yet so knee-deep in irony that its faux naïveté looks as chic as the latest retrofashions." Variety compared Reubens to Charlie Chaplin and Buster Keaton.

Roger Ebert of the Chicago Sun-Times did not review Pee-wee's Big Adventure upon its original release. However, in 1987, the film topped his Guilty Pleasures list, with Ebert saying he was impressed by "how innocent, how playful and how truly eccentric" the film was, and how the film created "a whole fairy-tale universe" comparable to Alice in Wonderland or Lord of the Rings. Ebert also mentioned Big Adventure in his review of Big Top Pee-wee (1988), explaining how moving away from the "zany weirdness" of the first Pee-wee Herman film led to a sequel that was "not as magical".

A more negative assessment came from Gene Siskel of the Chicago Tribune, who gave Pee-wee's Big Adventure a rare zero-star rating in his print review, writing that he had enjoyed Herman's guest spots on Late Night with David Letterman but "[o]bviously, Pee-Wee is tolerable only in Pee-Wee doses ... You have to be a lot funnier on the big screen than on the tube to sustain a feature-length story." Siskel included the film in his unranked year-end list of the worst movies of 1985. Vincent Canby of The New York Times was also negative, writing that, apart from a few scenes, it was "the most barren comedy I've seen in years, maybe ever."

The film was nominated for a Young Artist Award for Best Family Motion Picture (Comedy or Musical).

=== Sequels ===
The film was followed by two sequels: Big Top Pee-wee and Pee-wee's Big Holiday. Burton was offered the opportunity to direct the former but was not interested and was already working on his own pet project, Beetlejuice (1988). Positive reviews for Beetlejuice and the financial success of Pee-wee's Big Adventure prompted Warner Bros. to hire Burton to direct Batman (1989).

=== Retrospective appraisal ===
Is Pee‑wee a man or a boy? Does he live in our world or somewhere else? Is he sexual or asexual? Gay or straight? Camp or sincere? Funny or scary? An artifact of the past, or something avant-garde?

Pee‑wee's Big Adventure answers all those questions with... yes. It's an incredible accomplishment: in characterization, by Paul Reubens; and in filmmaking, by Tim Burton, who, in his first feature, balances the unanswerable questions and creates an on-screen world to match the mad genius Reubens had imbued Pee‑wee with onstage.

— Jesse Thorn, in a 2025 essay for the Criterion Collection

Reviewing the film for its 2000 DVD release, Stephanie Zacharek of Salon.com explained, "Everything about Pee-wee's Big Adventure, from its toy-box colors to its superb, hyper-animated Danny Elfman score to the butch-waxed hairdo and wooden-puppet walk of its star and mastermind is pure pleasure." That same year, William Thomas of Empire called the film "a one-off comic masterpiece" and "a dazzling debut" for Burton.

In a retrospective review in 2005, Christopher Null gave positive feedback, calling it "Burton's strangest film". In 2025, Jake Cole of Slant Magazine called Pee-wee's Big Adventure "one of the great cult comedies of the 1980s", writing: "Like Jerry Lewis's The Bellboy, the film's minimal plot is simply a pretext to stage a series of vignettes in which the protagonist is placed in different situations and watch as his energy seemingly alters reality around him."

== Home media ==
Warner Home Video released Pee-wee's Big Adventure on DVD in May 2000, with audio commentary by Burton, Reubens and Elfman (the latter on a separate track, alongside an isolated score) and some deleted scenes. The film was released on Blu-ray disc in October 2011. A new 4K restoration of the film was released on 4K Ultra HD/Blu-ray by the Criterion Collection on December 16, 2025.

== See also ==
- List of films about bicycles and cycling

== Bibliography ==
- Burton, Tim (2006). Salisbury, Mark (ed.). Burton on Burton. Faber & Faber. ISBN 978-0571229260.
