= Judd Omen =

American film and television actor

- Born: February 4, 1940 (age 86); Los Angeles, California, U.S.
- Occupations: Film and television actor

Judd Omen (born February 4, 1940) is an American film and television actor. He is best known for playing Mickey, the escaped convict in the 1985 film Pee-wee's Big Adventure.

== Life and career ==
Omen was born in Los Angeles, California on February 4, 1940. He began his screen career in 1973, appearing in the film Serpico. In 1974, he appeared in the film The Super Cops. In the same year, he made his television debut in the CBS crime drama television series Kojak.

Later in his career, Omen guest-starred in television programs including Baretta, The Fall Guy, Scarecrow and Mrs. King, The Greatest American Hero, The A-Team and Matlock. In 1985, he starred as Mickey, the escaped convict in the film Pee-wee's Big Adventure, starring along with Paul Reubens, E. G. Daily, Mark Holton and Diane Salinger. He also appeared in films such as Dune (as Jamis), C.H.U.D. II: Bud the C.H.U.D., Seems Like Old Times, Red Dawn and The Underachievers.

Omen retired from acting in 2005, last appearing in the film Take Out.
