= The Last Word (1979 film) =

1979 film by Roy Boulting

- Theatrical release poster
- Directed by: Roy Boulting
- Written by: Michael Varhol; Greg P. Smith; L. M. Kit Carson
- Story by: Horatius Haeberle
- Produced by: Richard G. Abramson
- Starring: Richard Harris; Karen Black; Martin Landau; Dennis Christopher; Penelope Milford
- Cinematography: Jules Brenner
- Edited by: George Grenville
- Music by: Carol Lees
- Distributed by: Samuel Goldwyn Company
- Release dates: October 10, 1979 (Chicago International Film Festival); March 12, 1980 (United States)
- Running time: 102 minutes
- Country: United States
- Language: English

The Last Word is a 1979 film starring Richard Harris. It was the last film directed by Roy Boulting.

It was also known as The Number.

== Plot ==
A washed-up inventor, Danny Travis, takes matters into his own hands in a very extreme way when he learns that his house will be condemned and his beloved children left on the street.

Travis is so upset that when a city official comes to evict him from the premises, he takes the man hostage. A television reporter, Paula Herbert, turns public sympathies both for and against Travis, prolonging the story opportunistically as a Los Angeles police captain, Gerrity, attempts to defuse the situation.

== Cast ==
- Richard Harris as Danny Travis
- Karen Black as Paula Herbert
- Martin Landau as Capt. Gerrity
- Dennis Christopher as Ben
- Christopher Guest as Roger
- Penelope Milford as Denise
- Penny Santon as Mrs. Tempino
