= Knucklehead (band) =

Canadian punk rock group formed in Calgary, Canada in 1994

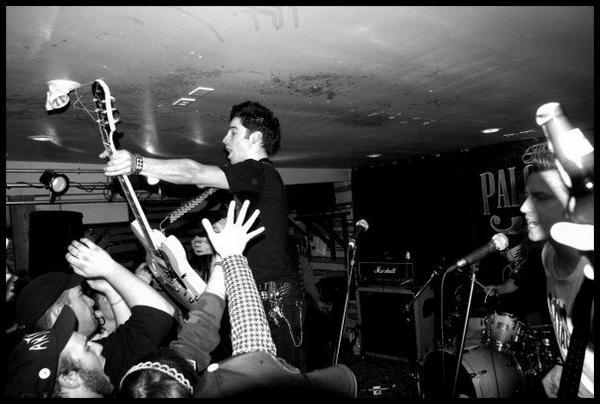
- Knucklehead, 2005

Background information
- Origin: Calgary, Alberta, Canada
- Genre: punk rock
- Years active: 1994–2013
- Members: Clayton MacNeill; Kyle Hegel; Matt Young; James; Eric Jablonski
- Past members: Casie Lewis; Kris Lesak; Joel Diemer
- Website: www.knucklehead.ca

Knucklehead was a Canadian punk rock group formed in Calgary, Alberta, in 1994. Influenced by such punk groups as Bad Religion, Stiff Little Fingers, Cocksparrer, Billy Bragg, and Social Distortion.

== History ==
Knucklehead played their first show in 1995 at The Night Gallery in Calgary, Alberta, and their recording history started almost as soon as the band was formed. They recorded their first demo tape in early 1994, and in 1995 released a 10" EP Ode to the Old Reliables. In 1996, their first full-length studio album Another Neurotic Episode was released on the independent Calgary based label Melodiya Records. In 1997, the band released a 7" white vinyl single on Sloth records (Calgary) called "When The Music Hits". It was part of the "Ship and Anchor Cocktail series", a string of 7" records that were themed as drinks (Knuckleheads was a white Russian). After touring eastern Canada and the United States, the band was picked up by Florida-based label Far Out Records and released a self-titled 7" and their second full-length studio album Little Boots in 1998. Knucklehead toured extensively across Canada and the United States in this period.

After the collapse of Far Out Records and the addition of a new drummer, Knucklehead began the recording of their 2001 release Voice Among Us on their own label, Whiskey Voice Records. The album was later licensed to Longshot Music and Belgium's Ghetto Rock Records for re-release in North America and Europe. In 2003, the band released their CD/EP Hostage Radio which contained a video for the song "Plight of the Living Dead". This video received numerous requests and air time on Canada's Much Music program The Punk Show. The band got a new guitarist and drummer in 2003, and with the new members they recorded a cover of the Stompin' Tom Connors classic "Canadian Lumberjack" for the Tom Connors tribute CD Bring Your Own Plywood. Knucklehead released another 7" in 2004 on Longshot Music entitled "Cosmetic Youth". Knucklehead released their fourth full-length studio album The New Black List on Stumble Records in 2005. The end of 2008 saw Knucklehead release another 7" on Longshot Music, this time a split with some friends from Toronto called Hostage Life. Their 2010 full length Hearts on Fire was released again on Stumble records with the LP version coming out a year later on Longshot. In 2013, the guys released a 7" on Pirates Press records.

== Members ==
From their first show in 1995, Knucklehead has been kept together by its founding three members. Originally a three piece band composed of Clayton MacNeill on guitar, Matt Young on Bass and Kyle Hegel on drums and vocals. The band remained this way up until 1999, when Casie Lewis took over drumming duty, This allowed Kyle to focus primarily on vocals. In 2001, Kris Lesak was recruited as the new drummer and Joel Diemer was also added as a second guitar. The look of the group changed again in 2003 when the band added Jimmy James (guitar) and Eric Jablonski also replaced drummer Kris Lesak.

== Discography ==
- Keep Your Hands Off My Sister (DIY Cassette Tape, 1994)
- Ode To The Old Reliables (10" - Melodiya Records, 1995)
- Another Neurotic Episode (CD - Melodiya Records, 1996)
- When The Music Hits (7" - Sloth Records, 1997)
- Knucklehead (7" Far Out Records, 1998)
- Little Boots (CD - Far Out Records, 1998)
- Voice Among Us (CD - Whiskey Voice Records [self produced], 2001)
- Voice Among Us/Little Boots (2-CD set - Ghetto Rock Records Europe, 2002)
- Voice Among Us (re-release on Longshot Music, 2003)
- Little Boots (re-release on Longshot Music, 2003)
- Hostage Radio (CD EP - Longshot Music, 2003)
- Cosmetic Youth (7" - Longshot Music, 2004)
- New Black List (CD - Stumble Records, 2005)
- w/Hostage Life (7" Split on Longshot Music, 2008)
- Hearts on Fire (CD - Stumble Records, October 2010)
- Hearts on Fire (LP - Longshot Music, 2011)
- Cold Civil War (7" - Pirates Press Records, 2013)

== Films ==
- Kitchen Party, 1997
- Bad Money, 1999
- Drop In, 2001
- My Son The Pornographer, 2005
- Kayfabe, 2007
