= The Big Picture (1989 film) =

1989 film by Christopher Guest

- Theatrical release poster
- Directed by: Christopher Guest
- Written by: Christopher Guest; Michael Varhol; Michael McKean
- Produced by: William E. McEuen; Michael Varhol; Richard Gilbert Abramson
- Starring: Kevin Bacon; Emily Longstreth; J. T. Walsh; Jennifer Jason Leigh
- Cinematography: Jeff Jur
- Edited by: Martin Nicholson
- Music by: David Nichtern
- Production company: Aspen Film Society
- Distributed by: Columbia Pictures
- Release date: September 15, 1989
- Running time: 100 minutes
- Country: United States
- Language: English
- Budget: $5 million
- Box office: $117,463

The Big Picture is a 1989 American comedy film starring Kevin Bacon and directed by Christopher Guest in his directorial debut.

== Plot ==
Film student and aspiring writer/director Nick Chapman, an Ohio native, finds himself the winner of a prestigious student film contest in LA. Overnight, Hollywood VIPs want to make deals with Nick. He settles on a quirky agent (Martin Short) to represent him and signs a deal with a major film studio to make his dream movie.

Nick finds the Hollywood studio "process" distasteful and is forced to make many creative compromises like adding a pop music soundtrack and aging down the middle-aged characters to college age. He strikes a deal and uses his newfound money and fame to lease a flashy sportscar and make new Hollywood friends. Nick blows off a lunch meeting with his film school friend Emmet (Michael McKean) and distances himself from his girlfriend, Susan (Emily Longstreth).

A new studio head cancels his film project and Nick is left in the lurch. Unable to strike any new film deals, college-educated Nick is reduced to unskilled positions like moving man, telemarketer, and message delivery man. His life is re-enacted in film parts.

Nick reunites with arty film school classmate Lydia (Jennifer Jason Leigh) and meets her next-door neighbors, an aspiring rock band in search of a director for their music video. Nick volunteers to shoot the video and it finds unexpected success on the charts. Nick's agent is flooded with interested calls as studio heads send movie and TV scripts for him. A humbled and repentant Nick reunites with Susan. He begins shooting his film as intended, in a winter cabin with middle-aged actors, with Emmet, Susan, and his parents at his side.

== Cast ==
- Kevin Bacon as Nick Chapman
- Emily Longstreth as Susan Rawlings
- J. T. Walsh as Allen Habel
- Jennifer Jason Leigh as Lydia Johnson
- Michael McKean as Emmet Sumner
- Teri Hatcher as Gretchen Gorman
- Dan Schneider as Jonathan Tristan-Bennet
- Jason Gould as Carl Manknik
- Kim Miyori as Jenny Sumner
- Tracy Brooks Swope as Lori Pressman
- Don Franklin as Todd Marvin
- Roddy McDowall as Judge

In addition, Martin Short has a significant uncredited role as Neil Sussman, Chapman's agent, appearing multiple times, with plot developments.

The film features numerous, cameo, "Special Appearances":

- Eddie Albert as M.C.
- Richard Belzer as Video Show Host
- John Cleese as The Bartender
- Stephen Collins as Attorney
- Fran Drescher as Polo Habel
- June Lockhart as Janet Kingsley
- Roddy McDowall as Judge
- Elliott Gould as Prosecutor (uncredited)

== Release ==
The film was greenlit by David Puttnam, president of Columbia Pictures, who was ousted two weeks after production began. According to Guest, the subsequent regime at the studio was unable to figure out what could be done with the film, as many executives at the studio didn't like the film because they felt like they were being brutally satirized in it. Columbia quietly gave The Big Picture a limited theatrical release (despite opening to positive reviews) before sending it to video.

== Reception ==
On the review aggregator website Rotten Tomatoes, 88% of 24 critics' reviews are positive, with an average rating of 6.7/10. The website's consensus reads: "The Big Picture aims at targets that might not be familiar to viewers who aren't well-versed in movie-biz chicanery, but hits most of them so solidly that laughter is the only option." Metacritic, which uses a weighted average, assigned the film a score of 64 out of 100, based on 8 critics, indicating "generally favorable" reviews.

When the film was first released, Siskel & Ebert gave it a rating of "two thumbs down" on their show At the Movies, with both men criticizing it for its fantasy sequences, cliched plotting, and allegedly unrealistic caricatures of Hollywood insiders. Ironically, during his RogerEbert.com review of the later Christopher Guest film For Your Consideration, film critic Jim Emerson would instead describe The Big Picture as "the definitive and most uncannily incisive satire of modern indie-Hollywood".
