= Josh Meyers (actor) =

American actor and comedian (born 1976)

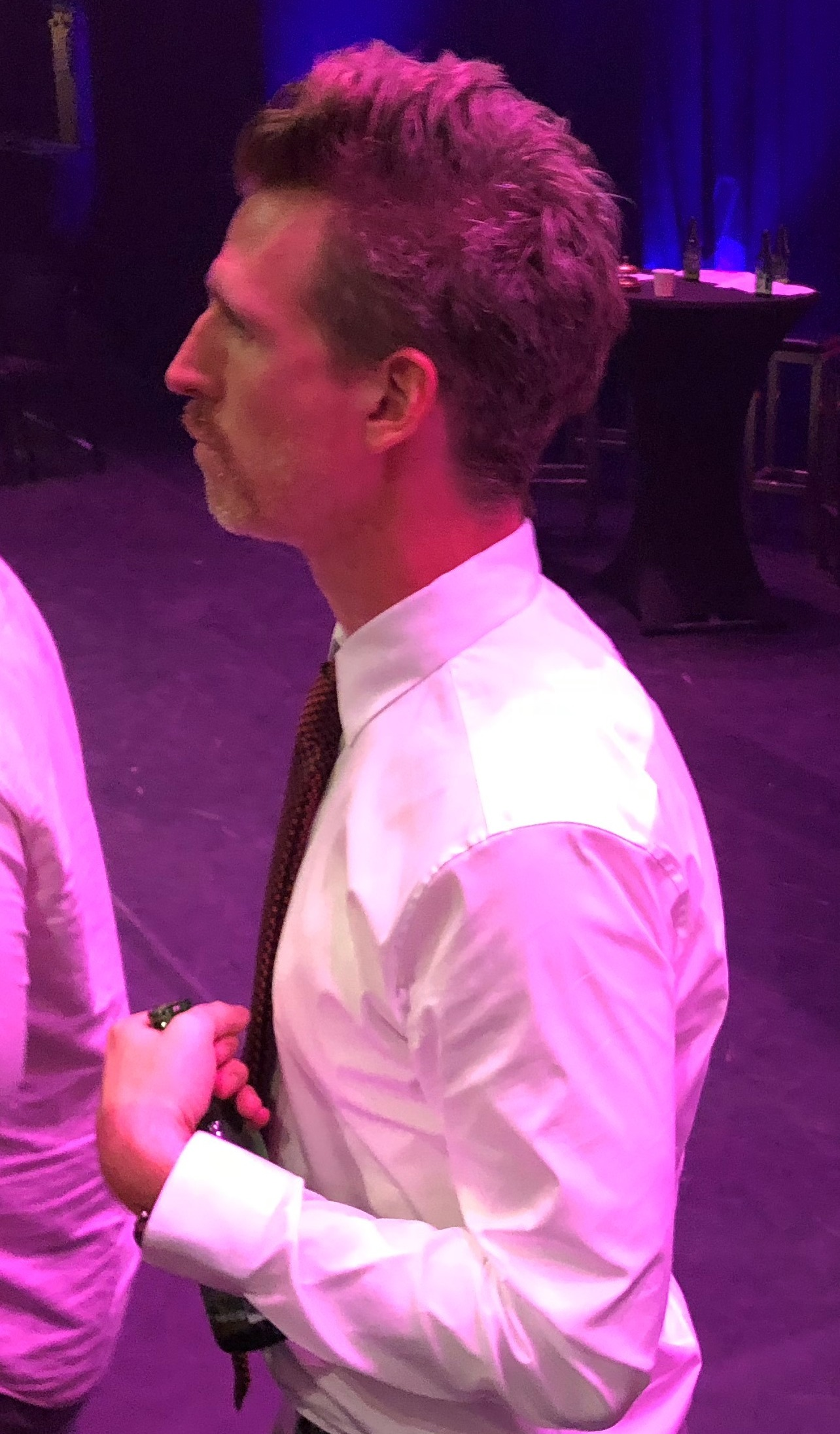
- The left side of Josh Meyers in 2018
- Born: Josh Dylan Meyers; January 8, 1976 (age 50)
- Occupations: Actor, comedian
- Years active: 2001–present
- Known for: That '70s Show, Family Trips with the Meyers Brothers
- Spouse: McKenzie Rollins (m. 2024)
- Relatives: Seth Meyers (brother)

Josh Dylan Meyers (/ˈmaɪ.ərz/ MY-ərz; born January 8, 1976) is an American actor and comedian, known for being a cast member of the sketch comedy series MADtv and playing Randy Pearson in the eighth and final season of That '70s Show. He is the younger brother of Seth Meyers who was a writer and cast member of Saturday Night Live and currently hosts Late Night.

== Early life, family and education ==
Meyers was born on January 8, 1976, the younger of two sons of Hilary Claire Meyers (née Olson), a French teacher, and Laurence Meyers Jr., who worked in finance. Meyers's paternal grandfather was Ashkenazi Jewish, and his other ancestry is Czech–Austrian, Croatian (from his paternal grandmother), Swedish, English, and German.

Meyers grew up primarily in Bedford, New Hampshire, and attended Manchester High School West in Manchester, New Hampshire. He graduated from Northwestern University in Evanston, Illinois.

== Career ==
=== MADtv ===
Meyers officially joined the cast of MADtv in 2002, as a featured performer for the eighth season. He would fill in the spot of the Spishak Spokesperson that David Herman and Pat Kilbane previously owned. Meyers was also known for his celebrity impersonations, including Anna Nicole Smith's son, Daniel, various members of 'N Sync (particularly Justin Timberlake), rapper Eminem, and actor Owen Wilson.

Meyers's appearances on MADtv on Fox aired directly opposite his brother Seth's appearances on Saturday Night Live on NBC, making Josh Meyers the only MADtv cast member to have a family member (blood-related or otherwise) be a cast member on Saturday Night Live. This was referenced on a season 28 episode of Saturday Night Live in which Seth appears on Weekend Update to talk to his father and tells him to turn off MADtv and pay attention to him.

=== Other work ===
When Topher Grace left That '70s Show at the end of the show's seventh season, Meyers was chosen as a replacement, starring as Randy Pearson during the eighth and final season. In 2006, Meyers made an appearance in the feature film Date Movie, where he plays Napoleon Dynamite and Owen Wilson's character from Wedding Crashers.

Meyers has a supporting role in the 2008 film College Road Trip, and appeared alongside Paul Reubens in the 2010 stage show revival of The Pee-wee Herman Show on Broadway.

Meyers also does a recurring satirical impersonation of Gavin Newsom as "Gov Gav" on Jimmy Kimmel Live!.

== Filmography ==
Film
Year	Title	Role	Notes
2001	Down	ESU cop #5	
2002	Snapshots	Hooligan in red light district	
2005	The Adventures of Big Handsome Guy and His Little Friend	Bar jerk	Short film
2006	Date Movie	Napoleon Dynamite/Owen Wilson look-alike	
2007	Wrangling Coach Rankin	Josh	Short film
2008	College Road Trip	Stuart	
2009	Brüno	Kookus	
2010	How to Make Love to a Woman	Andy Conners	
2013	Straight A's	Jason	
2013	Inventing Adam	Adam	
2013	The Sidekick	Jimmy T	Short film
2013	Cafe Attitude	—N/a	Short film
2014	Going to America	Andy	
2016	Pee-wee's Big Holiday	Sylvester	
2017	It's Gawd!	Tawd	
2018	The Oath	Jason Feldman	
2023	The Anne Frank Gift Shop	Diedrick	Short film

Television
Year	Title	Role	Notes
2002–2004	MADtv	Various	47 episodes
2003	Half & Half	Big Fat Slim Jim	2 episodes
2004	Life as We Know It	Sam Conner	Episode: "Family Hard-ships"
2005–2006	That '70s Show	Randy Pearson	Main cast (season 8); 21 episodes
2006	Lovespring International	Cal	Episode: "The Portrait and the Painter"
2011	The Pee-wee Herman Show on Broadway	Fireman Phineas, Various voices	Television film
2012	Are You There, Chelsea?	Dr. Carl Rosen	Episode: "The Gynecologist"
2012	Breaking In	Abe Frohman	Episode: "Who's the Boss"
2013	Newsreaders	Andrew Clatter	Episode: "Unborn Again"
2013	The Mindy Project	Adam	Episode: "Pretty Man"
2013	Behind the Candelabra	Liberace's attorney	Television film
2014	A to Z	Chad	Episode: "F Is for Fight, Fight, Fight!"
2014–2017	Red Oaks	Barry	Main cast
2015	Man Seeking Woman	Frankenboyfriend	Episode: "Teacup"
2015	The McCarthys	Jason	Episode: "Cutting the Cord"
2016	Angie Tribeca	Ned & Ted Doppleganger	Episode: "You've Got Blackmail"
2022	Quantum Leap	Percival “Uncle Percy“ Gray	Episode: "O Ye of Little Faith"
2023	History of the World, Part II	General Philip Sheridan	2 Episodes
2025	A Man on the Inside	Dr. Fentavious Garbanzo-Bean	Episode: "Family Weekend"
2025	FBI	Simon Ford	Episode: "Wolf Pack"

Web
Year	Title	Role	Notes
2009	Floored and Lifted	Matthew	Episode: "Matthew"
2009	My Long Distance Relationship	Professor Barnes	Television film
2010	Pee-wee Gets an iPad!	Clocky/Conky (voice)	Funny or Die short
2011	Workshop	Apartment leasing agent	Episode: "Sparkle White Gum"
2012	Dark Prophet	Agent Noah Parish	Episode: "Pilot"
2013–2015	The Awesomes	Perfect Man / Thug #3 (voice)	28 episodes
2014	Charles, Your Hangover	Rickey, the apprentice	Episode: "The Apprentice"
2016	Kings of Con	Kent O'Grady	Episode: "Bellevue, WA"
