= Pee-wee's Big Holiday =

- Netflix release poster
- Directed by: John Lee
- Written by: Paul Reubens; Paul Rust
- Produced by: Judd Apatow; Paul Reubens
- Starring: Paul Reubens; Joe Manganiello
- Cinematography: Tim Orr
- Edited by: Jeff Buchanan
- Music by: Mark Mothersbaugh
- Production companies: Pee-wee Pictures; Apatow Productions
- Distributed by: Netflix
- Release dates: March 17, 2016 (SXSW); March 18, 2016 (Netflix)
- Running time: 89 minutes
- Country: United States
- Language: English
- Budget: $30 million

Pee-wee's Big Holiday is a 2016 American adventure comedy film directed by John Lee and written by Paul Reubens and Paul Rust. The film stars Reubens as Pee-wee Herman and Joe Manganiello as himself. It is the second standalone sequel to Pee-wee's Big Adventure (1985), following Big Top Pee-wee (1988), and Reubens' final feature film role before his death in 2023.

The film underwent a prolonged period of development and was born out of two different completed scripts Reubens had mentioned as early as 2004: a black comedy called The Pee-wee Herman Story, where Herman becomes a singing star and moves to Hollywood; and a screen adaptation of his television series Pee-wee's Playhouse. Pee-wee's Big Adventure director Tim Burton was approached to direct but declined to participate.

In June 2010, it was announced that Reubens was now working with Judd Apatow on a new film, from a screenplay written by Reubens and Paul Rust. Pee-wee's Big Holiday began filming on March 16, 2015, and Reubens stated that the project had been greatly delayed due to script leaks. The film premiered at South by Southwest on March 17, 2016, and was released on Netflix the following day.

== Plot ==
Pee-wee Herman is a resident of the small town of Fairville and works as a fry cook at Dan's Diner, where he is well liked by the locals and revered for his diner cooking. However, his world is suddenly turned upside down when his band breaks up. Soon afterwards, he meets and befriends actor Joe Manganiello, who after seeing Pee-Wee's miniature town of Fairville, convinces him to leave town for the first time in his life to travel to New York City to attend Joe's birthday party.

Shortly after leaving Fairville, Pee-wee encounters three women being chased and, assuming they are innocent women in peril, becomes their getaway driver. It turns out that the three women, Pepper, Freckles, and Bella (who coincidentally goes by the nickname "Pee-Wee"), are bank robbers, who steal his car after kidnapping him. Pee-wee then gets a car ride from a travelling salesman named Gordon, who visits a creepy snake farm with Pee-wee in tow, and gives him a disguise kit.

Pee-wee tries to hitch-hike, but nobody stops, so he seeks refuge at a farmhouse owned by Farmer Brown, who lets Pee-wee spend the night. Farmer Brown introduces Pee-wee to his nine daughters, all of whom have a romantic interest in Pee-wee and spend the entire evening flirting with him. The next morning, Farmer Brown insists that Pee-wee marry one. During the wedding ceremony, Pee-wee uses the disguise kit to flee the church. He then gets a ride in an RV driven by four hairdressers who are en route to a hairdressing contest. Pee-wee realizes he is still far from New York, but the hair stylists implore him not to give up.

Pee-wee then meets Penny King, an aviator with a flying car, who offers to fly him to New York. The flying car crashes in the wilderness where Pee-wee meets Grizzly Bear Daniels who promises to show Pee-wee the way out of the woods, but instead, takes him to his cave from which he flees from.

After wandering lost for a time, he comes upon an Amish community, where he entertains the locals by slowly letting the air out of a balloon, causing it to squeak loudly and shrilly. Pee-wee discovers that the bank robbers are hiding among the Amish. That night when the women attempt to steal a horse and buggy, Pee-wee persuades them to leave some of their money behind for the Amish citizens to purchase a replacement.

Pee-wee and the women arrive in New York where the three women are arrested by the New York Police Department. Wandering the city, Pee-wee tries to make it to Joe's birthday party but falls down a well in Central Park just before the birthday party starts. Joe thought that Pee-wee decided not to come to his party and cannot enjoy himself. In a state of melancholy, Joe turns on the TV to the local news. There is a story about a rescue attempt by the New York Fire Department and the New York Police Department in progress to get "a boy" out of the well. Joe sneaks out of his apartment and rushes to the well and assists in the rescue. During the rescue, the entire town of Fairville, Pepper, Freckles, and Bella (while in their prison cell), travelling salesman Gordon, the staff of the snake farm, the hairdressers, Penny King, and Grizzly Bear Daniels are watching the news broadcast, that went national when Joe got involved. Joe then used a magnet he had in his suit to get Pee-Wee out of the well. When Pee-wee asks Joe, "What about the party?", Joe responds, "Pee-wee, we are the party", and then shows Pee-wee his miniatures including his own miniature version of Fairville he created, and a treehouse.

Pee-wee returns to his job at Dan's Diner, where he shows the Fairville residents some of the items he acquired during his trip. Joe appears in Fairville to give Pee-wee a ride on his motorcycle.

== Cast ==
- Paul Reubens as Pee-wee Herman
- Joe Manganiello as himself
- Jessica Pohly as Pepper
- Alia Shawkat as Bella
- Stephanie Beatriz as Freckles
- Brad William Henke as Grizzly Bear Daniels
- Hal Landon Jr. as Farmer Brown
- Diane Salinger as Penny King
- Patrick Egan as Gordon
- Tara Buck as Beverly
- Richard Riehle as Dan
- Leo Fitzpatrick as Abe
- Christopher Heyerdahl as Ezekiel
- Charlie Robinson as New York Police Department Captain
- Jordan Black as Yul/Party Coordinator
- Monica Horan as Ruby
- Brian Palermo as Marvin
- Josh Meyers as Sylvester
- Paul Rust as Ernie
- Robert R. Shafer as Construction Worker
- Darrin Dewitt Henson as Police Officer
- Frank Collison as Clay
- Lynne Marie Stewart as Jimmy
- Karen Maruyama as Tourist
- Lindsay Hollister as Peggy Brown
- Cooper Huckabee as Minister
- Darryl Stephens as Rene
- Anthony Alabi as Lane
- Sonya Eddy as Wanda
- David Arquette as DJ
- Nicole Sullivan as Shelly
- Janina Gavankar as Party Guest
- Thea Andrews as herself
- John Paragon as Cameraman
- Katherine VanderLinden as Emily

== Production ==
Reubens often talked about the two scripts he had written for future Pee-wee Herman films. Reubens once called his first script The Pee-wee Herman Story, describing it as a black comedy. He also referred to the script as "dark Pee-wee" or "adult Pee-wee", with the plot involving Pee-wee becoming famous as a singer after making a hit single and moving to Hollywood, where "he does everything wrong and becomes a big jerk". Reubens further explained that the script had many "Valley of the Dolls moments". Reubens thought this script would be the first one to start production, but in 2006, Reubens announced he was to start filming his second script in 2007.

The second script, a family-friendly adventure called Pee-wee's Playhouse: The Movie, followed Pee-wee and his Playhouse friends on a road-trip adventure, resulting in many of the characters leaving the house for the first time and going out into "Puppetland". All of the original characters of the show, live-action and puppets, were included in Reubens' script. The story happens in a fantasy land intended to be reminiscent of H.R. Pufnstuf and The Wonderful Wizard of Oz. In January 2009, Reubens told Gary Panter that the rejected first script of Pee-wee's Big Adventure (which they co-wrote) could be given a movie deal very soon, and that it would be "90 minutes of incredible beauty". In December 2009, while in character, Reubens said this film is "already done, the script is already fully written; it's ready to shoot." Most of the film was intended to take place in Puppetland with some claymation possibly being used for visual effects.

Reubens said that one of the two films opens in prison. He also said that using CGI for "updating" the puppets' looks could be an option, but that this would depend upon the budget the films would have. Reubens once mentioned the possibility of filming one of the two scripts as an animated film along the lines of The Polar Express (2004), which used performance capture technology to incorporate the movements of live actors into animated characters. Reubens approached Pee-wee's Big Adventure director Tim Burton with one of the scripts and talked to Johnny Depp about the possibility of having him portray Pee-wee but they both declined any involvement.

In June 2010, it was announced that Paul Reubens was working with Judd Apatow on a new Pee-wee Herman feature film set up at Universal Studios, with Reubens and Paul Rust set to write the script. In an October 2014 interview with Rolling Stone, Reubens gave an update on the status of the film, claiming its release was imminent.

In a November 2014 interview with The A.V. Club, Reubens explained why the film took so long to be made, attributing it to the leaking.

On February 24, 2015, Netflix announced the film would be titled Pee-wee's Big Holiday, with Apatow and Reubens producing the film, John Lee directing, and Reubens and Rust writing the screenplay. On March 11, 2015, Tara Buck joined the cast of the film. Principal photography began on March 16, 2015. On April 8, 2015, Joe Manganiello joined the cast. On April 19, 2015, Jessica Pohly was cast in the film.

Digital de-aging technology was used in the film to give Pee-wee a more youthful appearance, as Reubens felt the character "doesn't work, to me, with age mixed into it." Reubens stated that this had been his primary concern when initially discussing the film with Apatow, due to its cost, and that the results in the film had made him feel he could continue portraying the character for several more years.

== Release ==
On December 22, 2014, it was announced that the film would premiere exclusively on Netflix. In July 2015, Netflix announced the film would be released in March 2016. The film had its world premiere at South by Southwest on March 17, 2016. It was released on March 18, 2016, on Netflix. Additionally, there was a limited theatrical run of screenings at Alamo Drafthouse Cinema.

== Reception ==
Pee-wee's Big Holiday received positive reviews from critics. On Rotten Tomatoes, the film holds an 80% approval rating, based on 46 reviews, with an average rating of 6.86/10. The site's critical consensus reads, "The simple story is a little short on laughs, but there's plenty of sweet wackiness for Pee-wee Herman fans to enjoy." On Metacritic, the film holds a score of 63 out of 100, based on 19 critics, indicating "generally favorable reviews".

=== Interpretation ===
Upon its release, various entertainment and culture columnists made particular note of what they perceived as the film's deliberate romantic subtext regarding the relationship depicted between the story's two leads.

Slate Outward columnist Paul H. Johnson described the dynamic between the two main characters as "sweetly flirtatious", adding that, "While Pee-wee might seem childlike and sexless, his affection for Manganiello can only be called a crush. Pee-wee dreams of jousting with Manganiello using rainbow-colored lances, and they exchange friendship bands at the end of the movie while squeezed together in Manganiello's treehouse. This is what love looks like in Pee-wee's delicate, but deliberate, mode."

BuzzFeed entertainment editor Louis Peitzman lauded the film as a "queer love story", asserting that "categorizing Pee-wee and Joe as 'just friends' would be, at best, a euphemistic solution to a relationship that's deliberately vague but undeniably queer. [...] Big Holiday is a reminder that you don't have to meet heterocentric expectations: you can ride off on a motorcycle with your arms around Joe Manganiello. [...] It's the closest Pee-wee will likely ever get to a gay happily ever after, and for all that the movie holds back, it's remarkably satisfying."

Salon and Rolling Stone contributor Nico Lang cited other columnists' interpretation of the film's central storyline while expanding that "[Pee-wee] is simultaneously incredibly gay and not gay at all. And in Big Holiday, the character does something arguably even greater than come out of the closet: He resolves these identity conflicts to find happiness on his own terms. [...] Herman doesn't have to have actual sex with other men to be wonderfully, beautifully queer."
