= Seems Like Old Times (film) =

1980 film by Jay Sandrich

- Theatrical release poster by Robert Tanenbaum
- Directed by: Jay Sandrich
- Written by: Neil Simon
- Produced by: Margaret Booth; Roger M. Rothstein; Ray Stark
- Starring: Goldie Hawn; Chevy Chase; Charles Grodin; Robert Guillaume
- Cinematography: David M. Walsh
- Edited by: Michael A. Stevenson
- Music by: Marvin Hamlisch
- Production company: Rastar
- Distributed by: Columbia Pictures
- Release date: December 19, 1980
- Running time: 102 minutes
- Country: United States
- Language: English
- Box office: $44 million

Seems Like Old Times is a 1980 American comedy film starring Chevy Chase, Goldie Hawn, and Charles Grodin, directed by Jay Sandrich and written by Neil Simon. It was the only theatrical film directed by Sandrich, who was best known for his television sitcom directing work. It follows Nick Gardenia, a writer who is forced to rob a bank and becomes a fugitive, leaving him to seek help from his ex-wife Glenda Parks, a public defender. Her current husband, Ira Parks, is the Los Angeles County District Attorney, who harbors a jealous disdain towards Nick. The film was the second pairing of Hawn and Chase after 1978's Foul Play.

== Plot ==
Nick Gardenia, an out-of-luck writer, resides in a friend's oceanside cabin in Big Sur, California. He is interrupted by Warren "Dex" Dexter and B.G. Ramone, a pair of bank robbers who use him to rob a bank in Carmel. Their MO is to take an innocent person, force them at gunpoint to rob a bank, and then take the money and toss their captive out of their car. Unfortunately for Nick, he trips in the bank, is helped up and looks directly into a security camera.

The bank's picture of Nick comes to the attention of Los Angeles County District Attorney Ira Parks when his assistant, Fred, recognizes it to be Parks' wife Glenda's ex-husband. Because of his desire to become the California Attorney General, Ira is frustrated and upset, thinking this could harm his campaign.

Ira's wife, Glenda, is a lawyer herself. A public defender, Glenda often tries to rehabilitate her clients by giving them odd jobs around their house, as with her chauffeur and butler Chester. After a long day in court, Glenda comes home to mixed news: joy for Ira's run for Attorney General and surprise when Ira gives her the news about Nick. She wants to defend Nick because of her disbelief that he would rob a bank.

Dex and B.G. ditch Nick and he desperately begins to make his way to Glenda and Ira's Brentwood home, inadvertently holding up a gas station attendant for candy bars along the way. During a party, Glenda, while searching for her dog Polonius, finds Nick hiding in her garage. He begs for help, and she tries to get him some food despite most of the leaders of law enforcement being in her house. Nick explains what happened, but Glenda refuses to help unless he turns himself in. Glenda finally agrees to let him sleep in a guest room over the garage.

The next day, Nick decides to hunt down Dex and B.G. After some close run-ins with the police, Ira, and her feisty maid Aurora De La Hoya, Glenda keeps anyone from knowing Nick was there. He later takes Glenda's car to go after Dex and B.G. but then reappears over her garage, and another confrontation ensues between Ira and Glenda. Ira soon discovers that his car was stolen by Robert Broken Feather and Thomas Jefferson Wolf Call, two men that Glenda was defending. Then, Nick steals Glenda's car at gunpoint.

Ira's assistant, Fred, soon discovers that Nick was telling the truth about Dex and B.G. having forced him to rob the bank. Ira and Glenda are about to have the Governor of California over to their house for dinner. Glenda must deal with court cases; Aurora must have foot surgery, leaving her unavailable to cook the governor's favorite dish. Chester is drunk in the kitchen. Nick comes back to turn himself in and ends up serving dinner to the group. The dinner ultimately ends in a fistfight between a jealous Ira and Nick, during which Nick is knocked out.

Nick, Glenda, Ira, Aurora and Glenda's dogs ultimately end up in the courtroom of Judge John Channing. While Channing is overwhelmed by the happenings in the Parks household, the police bring in Dex and B.G. They admit Nick's innocence in exchange for a reduced sentence after getting caught by Aurora and the dogs when they attempted to force her to rob a bank, just like they had done with Nick.

After the case is closed, Nick and Glenda still have unresolved feelings. She decides to stay with Ira and kisses Nick goodbye. Some time later, Ira and Glenda decide to take a car trip to forget the recent events. They end up in an accident trying to avoid a cow on the road. Ira breaks his leg, so Glenda searches for help and finds a cabin with all the lights on. Glenda pounds on the door, and Nick answers.

== Cast ==
- Goldie Hawn as Glenda Gardenia Parks
- Chevy Chase as Nicholas J. Gardenia
- Charles Grodin as Ira J. Parks
- Robert Guillaume as Fred
- Harold Gould as Judge John Channing
- George Grizzard as Governor Stanley
- Yvonne Wilder as Aurora De La Hoya
- T. K. Carter as Chester
- Judd Omen as Warren "Dex" Dexter
- Marc Alaimo as B. G. Ramone
- Bill Zuckert as Gas Station Attendant
- Jerry Houser as Gas Station Attendant
- David Haskell as Policeman
- Chris Lemmon as Policeman
- Joseph Running Fox as Thomas Jefferson Wolf Call
- Ray Tracey as Robert Broken Feather

== Production ==
According to Turner Classic Movies, Neil Simon was inspired by The Talk of the Town. This 1942 comedy starred Cary Grant as wrongfully accused man Leopold Dilg hiding out at the home of the beautiful Nora Shelley, played by Jean Arthur, with Ronald Colman as Michael Lightcap, the third member of the romantic triangle. Editor Margaret Booth who worked for producer Ray Stark, said she "hated" the film and felt Golden Hawn and Chevy Chase, "I didn't think clicked."

== Reception ==
Roger Ebert, in a December 24, 1980 review, gave the film two stars out of four and wrote that although it made him "laugh out loud", the movie never "edged over the line of success". He said, "the good parts were good enough to hold out the promise for more. The movie is Neil Simon's attempt at one of those 1940s-style screwball comedies with lots of surprise entrances and hasty exits and people hiding under the bed. It would be hard to improve on the casting (Goldie Hawn, Chevy Chase and Charles Grodin). And there are a couple of really funny, sustained sequences." Gene Siskel of the Chicago Tribune also awarded two stars out of four and called it a "limp comedy" with "only gag lines and no characters." Janet Maslin of The New York Times described the film as "Neil Simon in very funny form" and the cast as "extremely appealing," adding, "The material here is slick and entertaining, and Mr. Sandrich settles for comic simplicity without reaching for anything more. He coaxes the film along at a cheerfully breakneck rhythm."

Charles Champlin of the Los Angeles Times wrote that "if it gets a zero for innovation, it gets somewhere around 93 for the skill with which it delivers an old-fashioned slapstick farce. Like a Henny Youngman routine, it is funny partly because it tries so hard, in a stop-at-nothing-you-take-my-wife-please way, to be funny." Variety wrote that Sandrich "has relied basically upon Neil Simon's script, often funny but thin on development, to carry things. The result is a picture that is amusing on the surface but very typical in terms of its setups ... Of course, none of the pic's drawbacks much matter thanks to the extremely engaging rapport between Chase and Hawn." Jack Kroll of Newsweek wrote that Simon's working on the models of old screwball comedies gave the movie "a breeziness most of his film writing has lacked. On the laugh meter this movie does well. Sandrich has a nice light touch, and his cast is excellent. Especially, of course, Goldie Hawn, the delightful comedienne who provides more pure pleasure than any other movie actress today."

On review aggregator Rotten Tomatoes, 71% of 21 critics' reviews are positive. Metacritic, which uses a weighted average, assigned the film a score of 58 out of 100, based on nine critics, indicating "mixed or average reviews". The film was nominated for a Golden Raspberry Award for Worst Supporting Actor for Charles Grodin at the 1st Golden Raspberry Awards.
