= John Paragon =

American actor and writer (1954–2021)

- Paragon as Cedric in Seinfeld
- Born: John Dixon Paragon; December 9, 1954; Anchorage, Alaska Territory, U.S.
- Died: April 3, 2021 (aged 66); Palm Springs, California, U.S.
- Occupations: Actor; writer; director
- Years active: 1980–2016
- Notable work: Pee-wee's Playhouse

John Dixon Paragon (December 9, 1954 – April 3, 2021) was an American actor, writer and director. He was best known for his work on the television series Pee-wee's Playhouse, where he portrayed Jambi the Genie and voiced Pterri the Pterodactyl. He was also a writer and director on a number of episodes.

== Early life ==
Paragon was born on December 9, 1954, in Anchorage, Alaska, and grew up in Fort Collins, Colorado. He graduated from Fort Collins High School in 1973.

== Career ==
Paragon got his start in the Los Angeles-based improvisation group the Groundlings alongside Paul Reubens and Phil Hartman.

He played Jambi the Genie on the children's TV show Pee-wee's Playhouse. In addition to writing many of its regular-season episodes, he co-wrote (with Reubens) the Pee-wee's Playhouse Christmas Special in 1988, for which they were nominated for an Emmy Award for Best Writing in a Children's Special.

His other roles include Cedric, one half of the couple Bob and Cedric on the television series Seinfeld; the title character in the children's movie The Frog Prince; the sex shop salesman in Eating Raoul; a surf photographer in North Shore; and the owner of a strip-o-gram business in the 1986 film Echo Park.

He collaborated with fellow Groundling Cassandra Peterson on numerous Elvira projects, including the recurring role of The Breather, an annoying caller, for her first television series on KHJ-TV-Los Angeles.

Paragon worked with Walt Disney Imagineering on ways to incorporate improvisational performance into attractions at Disney parks. In this capacity, he performed as the keeper of Lucky the Dinosaur during test runs of the animatronic figure.

He returned to his performance as Jambi the Genie in the Broadway outing of the Pee-wee Herman stage show that began performances at the Stephen Sondheim Theater on October 26, 2010.

== Death ==
Paragon died on April 3, 2021, at his home in Palm Springs, California, at the age of 66. His cause of death was heart disease and chronic alcoholism. News of his death was not made public until June 18 of that year. He was cremated and his ashes were in the possession of Cassandra Peterson until they were interred at the Hollywood Forever Cemetery on November 15, 2022. His urn is "a perfectly crafted depiction" of the purple-and-gold Jambi the Genie box.

== Filmography ==
=== Films ===
Year	Title	Director	Writer	Actor	Role	Notes	Ref(s)
1980	Cheech and Chong's Next Movie			Yes	Director		
1982	Eating Raoul			Yes	Sex Shop Salesman		
1982	Pandemonium			Yes	Prisoner		
1982	Things Are Tough All Over			Yes	Red Carpet Man #1		
1982	Airplane II: The Sequel			Yes	Economy Flight Attendant		
1983	Going Berserk			Yes	Rooster		
1984	Uncensored			Yes	Various	Direct-to-video film	
1985	Pee-wee's Big Adventure			Yes	Movie Lot Actor		
1985	Get Out of My Room			Yes	Robert Walters	Direct-to-video mockumentary	
1986	Echo Park			Yes	Hugo		
1986	The Frog Prince			Yes	Ribbit / Prince of Freedly		
1987	North Shore			Yes	Professor		
1988	Elvira: Mistress of the Dark		Yes	Yes	Gas Station Attendant		
1989	UHF			Yes	Richard Fletcher		
1992	Double Trouble	Yes		Yes	FBI Agent		
1992	Honey, I Blew Up the Kid			Yes	Lab Technician		
1992	Ring of the Musketeers	Yes		Yes	Air Traffic Controller Manfred Wenzel		
1994	Every Breath			Yes	Director		
1994	Twin Sitters	Yes	Yes	Yes	Loan officer		
1996	The Rich Man's Wife			Yes	Maitre D'		
2001	Elvira's Haunted Hills		Yes		—N/a		
2006	Red Riding Hood			Yes	Fisherman		
2016	Pee-wee's Big Holiday			Yes	TV Cameraman		

Also production consultant direct-to-video ThrillerVideo (1985).

=== Television ===
Year	Name	Director	Writer	Actor	Role	Notes	Ref(s)
1981	The Pee-wee Herman Show		Yes	Yes	Jambi / Pterri (voice)	Television film	
1981–2011	Elvira's Movie Macabre		Yes	Yes	Breather	6 episodes as actor; 1 episode as writer	
1982	Madame's Place			Yes	Holistic doctor	1 episode	
1983	The Paragon of Comedy		Yes	Yes	Various	Television film	
1983	The 1/2 Hour Comedy Hour			Yes	Various		
1983	The New Scooby and Scrappy-Doo Show			Yes	(voice)	Episode: "No Sharking Zone"	
1984	Last of the Great Survivors			Yes	Beef	Television film	
1984	Cheeseball Presents		Yes	Yes	Breather	Television film	
1984	Welcome to the Fun Zone			Yes	Himself	Television film	
1984	Elvira's MTV Halloween Party		Yes	Yes	Breather	Television film	
1985	FTV			Yes	Various		
1985–2011	Saturday Night Live		Yes	Yes	Pterri (voice)	1 episode as actor, 1 episode as writer	
1986	Leo & Liz in Beverly Hills			Yes	Raddichio	Episode: "Remodeling"	
1986–90	Pee-wee's Playhouse	Yes	Yes	Yes	Jambi / Pterri (voice)	41 episodes as actor; 25 episodes as writer; 20 episodes as director	
1987	Cheers			Yes	Grif Palmer	Episode: "Pudd'n Head Boyd"	
1988	Sledge Hammer!			Yes	Durward Monroe	Episode: "Suppose They Gave a War and Sledge Came?"	
1988	The Cheech Show		Yes		—N/a	Television film	
1991	On the Television			Yes	Various	Episode: "Stupid People's Court"	
1992	Ring of the Musketeers	Yes	Yes	Yes	Air Traffic Controller	Television film	
1993	The Elvira Show		Yes	Yes	Voice of 'Reinfield'		
1995	Kirk			Yes	Ricky	Episode: "Educating Kirk"	
1995–97	Night Stand with Dick Dietrick			Yes	Bachelor #3 / Dr. Ed Burns	5 episodes	
1995–98	Seinfeld			Yes	Cedric	3 episodes	
1996	Renegade	Yes			—N/a	Episode: "Ransom"	
1996–98	Silk Stalkings	Yes			—N/a	10 episodes	
1997	Pacific Blue	Yes			—N/a	Episode: "Sisters"	
1999	Star Trek: Deep Space Nine			Yes	Bokar	Episode: "Prodigal Daughter"	
1999	Mega Babies		Yes		—N/a	2 episodes	
2001	You Don't Know Jack		Yes		—N/a	Also consultant	
2011	The Pee-Wee Herman Show on Broadway		Yes	Yes	Jambi / Pterri (voice)	Television film	
2014	13 Nights of Elvira		Yes		—N/a	Also producer and music supervisor	
