= Richard Gilbert Abramson =

American film producer

- Occupation: Film producer

Richard Gilbert Abramson is a film producer.

== Filmography ==
Year	Film	Credit
1975	Banjoman (Note: Documentary about Earl Scruggs; also featured performances by Ramblin' Jack Elliott, Joan Baez, Tracy Nelson & Mother Earth, David Bromberg, Nitty Gritty Dirt Band, The Byrds, Doc Watson and Merle Watson.)	Director; Producer
1979	The Last Word	Producer
1985	Pee-wee's Big Adventure	Producer
1986–1987	Pee-wee's Playhouse	TV series Producer
1988	Big Top Pee-wee	Producer
1989	The Big Picture	Producer
1989	It Had to Be You	Producer
1989	Cold Dog Soup	Producer
1991	Interceptors	Producer
1996	Theodore Rex	Producer
2016	Cemetery of Splendour	Richard
