= The Thrill Can Kill =

Anti-drug campaign

The Thrill Can Kill was an anti-drug campaign from the motion picture industry which ran from 1987 to 1990, by the Partnership for a Drug-Free America organization. Featuring celebrities such as Pee-wee Herman, Clint Eastwood, Nancy Reagan, Bette Midler, James Woods, Olivia Newton-John, Ally Sheedy, Dudley Moore, Roy Scheider, Rosanna Arquette, and Rae Dawn Chong, the anti-drug video spots ran 38 to 90 seconds in movie theaters. The campaign was promoted by First Lady Nancy Reagan, with money and talent provided by the MPAA studios. The first movie to feature a spot from the campaign was the July 1987 theatrical release of Jaws: The Revenge. The public service announcements (PSA)s featuring Pee Wee Herman, a lead children's entertainment figure, and Clint Eastwood, who presented himself with his Dirty Harry persona and also did an additional PSA with Nancy Reagan, were at the time considered to be among the most pivotal to the campaign.
