= The Punk Show =

- Country of origin: Canada

Original release
- Network: Much; Stingray Loud

The Punk Show was a half hour video block that aired on Thursdays at midnight and Fridays at 4:00 AM on MuchMusic and MuchLOUD. The program usually aired a mix of known punk bands and some underground Canadian groups. Sometimes, videos by ska, emo, and hardcore bands would be shown as well.

Despite The Punk Show being the only guaranteed way to watch non-mainstream punk videos on MuchMusic, it was often subject to preemptions during its 12:00 timeslot, usually for a marathon of more demographic-friendly shows, or a re-airing of a previously aired program.
