= Big Top Pee-wee =

1988 film by Randal Kleiser

- Theatrical release poster
- Directed by: Randal Kleiser
- Written by: Paul Reubens; George McGrath
- Produced by: Paul Reubens; Debra Hill
- Starring: Paul Reubens; Kris Kristofferson; Susan Tyrrell; Valeria Golino
- Cinematography: Steven Poster
- Edited by: Jeff Gourson
- Music by: Danny Elfman
- Distributed by: Paramount Pictures
- Release date: July 22, 1988
- Running time: 85 minutes
- Country: United States
- Language: English
- Budget: $20 million
- Box office: $15.1 million

Big Top Pee-wee is a 1988 American comedy film directed by Randal Kleiser. A standalone sequel to Pee-wee's Big Adventure (1985), the film stars Paul Reubens reprising his role as Pee-wee Herman, with Susan Tyrrell, Kris Kristofferson, Penelope Ann Miller and Valeria Golino in supporting roles. The original music score is composed by Danny Elfman, who could not re-use themes from his Pee-wee's Big Adventure score, due to contractual restrictions.

The film was released on July 22, 1988, and grossed $15 million against a $20 million budget. It received negative reviews, with critics calling it inferior to the previous film. Another standalone sequel, Pee-wee's Big Holiday, was released in 2016.

== Plot ==
Pee-wee Herman lives an idyllic life on a farm with his assistant Vance, a talking pig. There he grows vegetables, dreams of being a Frank Sinatra-esque singer, has a daily lunch with his fiancée, schoolteacher Winnie Johnson, and conducts agronomical experiments in a secure greenhouse. One day after lunch with Winnie, he walks into Mr. Ryan's general store to order a sandwich. The local sheriff arrives at the store and warns of a large storm approaching town. Pee-wee rushes home and puts his farm animals into shelter.

After the storm ends, Pee-wee emerges from his storm shelter to discover that an entire traveling circus called the "Cabrini Circus" has been blown into his backyard. He befriends the ringmaster Mace Montana and falls for trapeze artist Gina Piccolapupula, the circus's star attraction. Winnie catches Pee-wee just as he shares his first kiss with Gina, and both women shun him for two-timing them. Pee-wee calls off his engagement to Winnie and convinces Gina that he truly loves her, whereupon she warms up to him again and they begin a romantic relationship. Winnie forgives Pee-wee after finding that she would much rather date all four of Gina's brothers at once.

Pee-wee attempts to join the circus, but has trouble with the acts, Gina then suggests that he should wear the same costume her father wore. She tells him that he was accidentally killed while performing in a circus years ago, but before he died, he told her that if anything were to happen to him, she is to give his costume to someone who cares for her. Pee-wee accepts, then Pee-wee then thinks about giving up farm life so he can be with Gina in the circus. Mace then decides because of Pee-wee's help, he has folded the "Cabrini Circus" and in its place will be "The American Farm Circus."

The elderly and grouchy towns people who aren't fond of Pee-wee hate the circus and want it gone. Not caring what the town elders say, the circus hangs up flyers all over the town. The towns people take down the flyers and show the sheriff what Pee-wee and the circus have done. Just as the circus is about to go on, the sheriff, Mr. Ryan and the rest of the towns people show up, and the sheriff threatens to arrest Pee-wee for having the circus invade the town, Mr. Ryan tells them that Winnie had bought the groceries from his store just to give them to the circus and they also accuse Pee-wee for sending the animals to attack them, which he declines. The sheriff then makes his decision; if the circus doesn't leave town, then not only would Pee-wee be thrown in jail, but Mace, Gina and the others would be too. However, if they do leave town, then the sheriff will drop all the charges. With no choice, Mace tells everyone that they have to leave. Pee-wee protests the idea because he didn't get to perform with them. Mace and Gina tell him that they will promise to have Pee-wee do the circus with them in another town because they don't want to go to jail.

Pee-wee recalls one of his agronomical experiments, a serum that, when applied to one of his other experiments, a hot-dog tree, made the hot dogs reverse their growth and shrink to the size of cocktail weiners. He feigns repentance to the town elders and feeds them the serum-laced cocktail weiners, causing them to become children again excited for the circus. With no obstacle remaining, the circus performs their new American Farm show for the townspeople (including the former elders), and Winnie announces that she's engaged to the Piccolapupula brothers. Pee-wee walks the tightrope with his farm animals.

== Cast ==
- Paul Reubens as Pee-wee Herman
- Kris Kristofferson as Mace Montana
- Susan Tyrrell as Midge Montana
- Valeria Golino as Gina Piccolapupula
- Penelope Ann Miller as Winnie Johnson
- Wayne White as the voice of Vance
- Albert Henderson as Mr. Ryan
  - Kevin B. Kaplowitz as Young Mr. Ryan
- Jack Murdock as Otis
  - Jeffrey R. Shaw as Young Otis
- David Byrd as Deke
  - Dustin Diamond as Young Deke
- Frances Bay as Mrs. Haynes
  - Savannah Prue as Young Mrs. Haynes
- Mary Jackson as Mrs. Dill
  - Lisa M. Ball as Young Mrs. Dill
- Leo Gordon as Joe
- Anne Seymour as Pearl
  - Marie Hawkins as Young Pearl
- Kenneth Tobey as Sheriff
  - Shea Joachim as Young Sheriff
- Jay Robinson as Cook
- Eve Smith as Bunny
- Andrew Shalat as Paolo Piccolapupula
- Mihaly 'Michu' Meszaros as Andy
- Franco Columbu as Otto
- Terrence Mann as "Snowball"
- Vance Colvig as "Clownie"
- Matthias Hues as Oscar
- Benicio del Toro as Duke
- Kevin Peter Hall as John "Big John"
- Lynne Marie Stewart as Zelda
- John Sherrod as Del
- Joey Arias as Shim
- Helen Infield Siff as Ruth
- Carol Infield Sender as Dot
- Bunny Summers as Ruby
- Stephanie Hodge as Judy
- April Tatro as Trisha
- Carla Drake as Fire Eater
- Joe Gibb as Roustabout Clown
- Tai as A Circus Elephant (uncredited)

== Production ==
Following the success of the 1985 Warner Bros. film Pee-wee's Big Adventure, Paul Reubens signed a development deal with Paramount Pictures to write, produce, and/or direct additional projects for the character of Pee-wee Herman. Big Top Pee-wee was the first project in the deal to go into production.

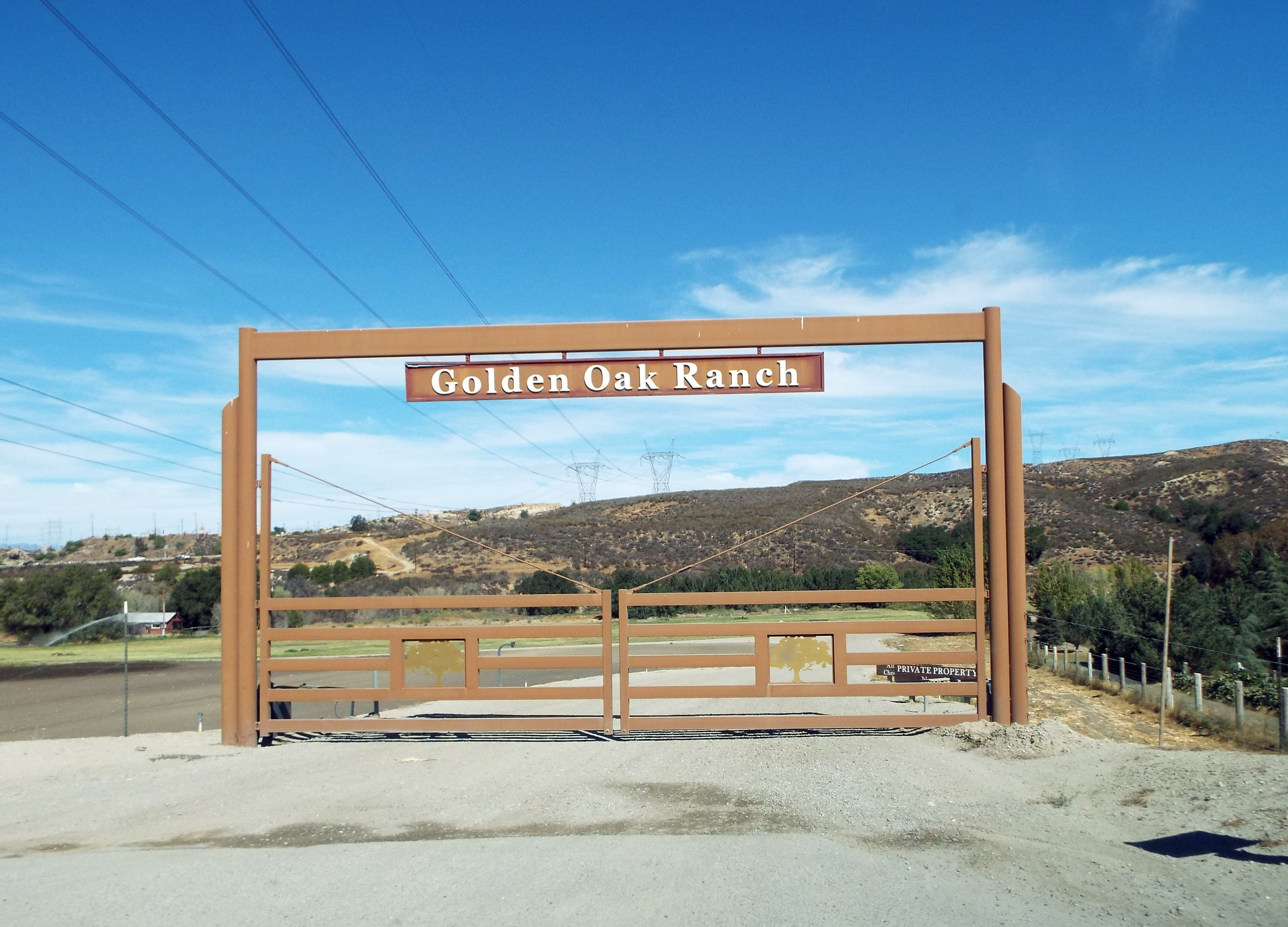
Golden Oak Ranch, the farm where Pee-Wee lives.

The Paramount production was directed by Randal Kleiser and written by Paul Reubens and George McGrath. Reubens also co-produced the film with Debra Hill. Filming locations included Disney's Golden Oak Ranch in Newhall, California, and the auditorium at Hart High School in Santa Clarita. Big Top Pee-wee was Kleiser's first movie for Paramount since 1978's Grease.

During a 1988 television special, Herman acknowledged the long hours of circus training undertaken by the film's actors and that they spent a year and a half working on the movie. He also humorously compared himself as an actor to James Cagney and Spencer Tracy and ended by saying that Big Top Pee-wee was "at least as good as Police Academy." (Note: Likely referring to the then-recently released Police Academy 5 (1988).)

== Release and reception ==
On Rotten Tomatoes, the film has a 30% rating based on 86 reviews, with the site's critical consensus stating: "Its endearingly oddball lead character gives it his all, but Big Top Pee-Wee simply lacks the whimsical magic of its predecessor." Metacritic, which uses a weighted average, assigned the film a score of 42 out of 100, based on 18 critics, indicating "mixed or average" reviews.

Roger Ebert gave the film two stars in his print review for The Chicago Sun Times, writing the film was "not as magical" as the first film in the series. Ebert and colleague Gene Siskel both gave the film a "thumbs down" on their television program At the Movies. In a comparison to previous appearances of the Pee-wee character, Ebert claimed that what had made Pee-wee's Playhouse and Pee-wee's Big Adventure great was "the characters in those have absolutely no connection with reality whatsoever, and that is why they were so enduring and enjoyable". Caryn James of The New York Times criticized the film for making Pee-wee "slightly less eccentric" and said the "new, lukewarm, compromised Pee-wee is remarkably unfunny." The negative reviews reflected the film's performance at the box office, where it grossed $15,122,324, suffering from competition with Who Framed Roger Rabbit, Coming to America, and the re-issue of Bambi, among other summer releases. In 2010, Paul Reubens said that Paramount terminated his development deal and evicted him from his office on their lot the day after the movie's disappointing opening weekend.

The film was followed by another standalone sequel, Pee-wee's Big Holiday (2016).
