= The Pee-wee Herman Show =

Stage show developed by Paul Reubens in 1980

- Created by: Paul Reubens
- Starring: Paul Reubens; Phil Hartman; John Paragon; Lynne Marie Stewart
- Country of origin: United States

Production
- Production location: The Roxy Theatre
- Running time: 60 minutes
- Production company: Reubens-Callner Productions

Original release
- Network: HBO
- Release: September 11, 1981

The Pee-wee Herman Show is a stage show developed by Paul Reubens in 1980. The show is the first significant appearance of Reubens' fictional comic character Pee-wee Herman. The show debuted as a midnight show in February 1981 at the Groundlings theater, and was later moved to the Roxy Theatre in West Hollywood, California, in September of that same year, where the HBO cable network taped one of the shows and aired it as a special. The special was later released on DVD by Image Entertainment in 2006. The nightclub show had more adult humor than the later children's television series Pee-wee's Playhouse.

== Development ==
The Pee-wee Herman Show was developed when Paul Reubens was one of twenty-two finalists to be chosen as a regular on Saturday Night Live, which was the infamous first season of an all-new cast, and one of five seasons without the show's creator, Lorne Michaels, as a producer. Reubens thought his career was over when Gilbert Gottfried was chosen over him. According to Reubens, he was about to return home when he came up with the idea of a stage show featuring his character he had premiered in 1977, Pee-wee Herman. That year, the character had made his first appearance to a national (but mostly adult) audience when he made a cameo in Cheech & Chong's Next Movie. With $3,000, most of which had been wired to him from his parents, and help from 60 people working for him, including three fellow Groundlings, Phil Hartman, John Paragon and writer/director Bill Steinkellner, Reubens created the show.

== Plot ==
At home in his Puppetland playhouse, Pee-wee entertains his audience of "boys and girls" in a homage to low-budget 1950s’ TV kiddie-shows such as Howdy Doody and Pinky Lee.

Pee-wee spends the day with his friends and fellow citizens of Puppetland, including Pterri the pterodactyl, Mr. Knucklehead, Captain Carl, Miss Yvonne, Jambi the genie in a box, Clockey the USA wall-map and clock, Mailman Mike, Hammy and his sister Susan, Hermit Hattie, and the singing next-door neighbors Mr. and Mrs. Jelly Do-nut.

Pee-wee really wants to be able to fly after he is given a wish by Jambi the genie, but he decides to give his wish away to Miss Yvonne, who wants Captain Carl to "really like her" and think she's "beautiful from head to toe".

During the course of his busy day, Pee-wee sings and dances, reads pen pal letters "from around the world" (including prison), conducts a hypnosis puppet act with a female audience member who undresses under his command, and shows a cartoon and a condensed vintage 1959 educational film about proper deportment called Beginning Responsibility: Lunchroom Manners.

Later, Pee-wee gets upset that he gave away his magic wish when he sees Captain Carl and Miss Yvonne happily on a date. After much pouting and throwing a tantrum, Pee-wee finally runs away.

The concerned citizens of Puppetland find out about Pee-wee's secret wish and after Captain Carl reveals that he had already liked Miss Yvonne, they all realize that Pee-wee still has a wish coming. Jambi the genie then grants Pee-wee's wish to be able to fly.

Pee-wee triumphantly soars and roars above Puppetland and proclaims that he is the "luckiest boy in the world".

== Vinyl record ==
Originally released in 1981, a vinyl 12" one-sided hand silk-screened picture disc was released of the performance by Fatima Recordz. The cover features a drawing of Pee-wee by Gary Panter, who would later win three Emmy Awards for his set design on Pee-wee's Playhouse.

Silk-screening was done by Richard Duardo but the design of the sleeve and of the album was done by Gary Panter. The paper sleeve states that it was recorded at the Roxy Theater, L.A. June 1981. All music was composed and arranged by Jay Cotton except as noted.

=== Tracks ===
1. "Pee-wee's Playhouse"
2. "Good Morning Song" (Lyrics by Paul Reubens)
3. "A Sailor's Life" (Music and lyrics by Reubens and Hartman)
4. "Most Beautiful Woman in Puppetland"
5. "Ballad of Hermit Hattie" (Composed by Edie McClurg)
6. "Rub The Top of Jambi's Box" (Lyrics by John Paragon)
7. "I Gotta Go Be By My Self / Call Me Ms. Bungle"
8. "He's Gonna Get His Wish – His Way – What He Wants"
9. "Luckiest Boy In The World" (Lyrics by Reubens and Bill Steinkellner)
10. "Volare Pee-wee" (Vocal by John Paragon)

== Cast ==
- Pee-wee Herman – Paul Reubens
- Jambi / Pterri – John Paragon
- Miss Yvonne – Lynne Marie Stewart
- Captain Carl / Monsieur LeCroq – Phil Hartman
- Hammy – Tito Larriva
- Susan — Nicole Panter
- Hermit Hattie / Clockey – Edie McClurg

== 2010 stage show revival ==
Paul Reubens told the press in interviews that he hoped his revival of his Pee-wee Herman stage show would help garner producer interest and funding for a new feature film, possibly with a new actor playing the role of Pee-wee.

The Pee-wee Herman Show was originally scheduled for November 8–29, 2009 at the Music Box Theatre in Hollywood. Due to high demand and technical needs, the show moved venues from Music Box to Club Nokia @ L.A. Live with a run between January 12 and February 7, 2010. The cast rehearsed at Sunset-Gower Studios before moving to technical rehearsals at Club Nokia.

The updated show re-written by Paul Reubens contains modern references to the Internet, iPad, abstinence rings, and ShamWow. It has several new characters, including handyman Sergio, firefighter Phineas, and a dancing-mute Bear. Elements of the TV series, Pee-wee's Playhouse, were merged into the stage show. The plotline of Captain Carl's (originally played the late Phil Hartman) crush on Miss Yvonne was switched to that of Cowboy Curtis. Added to the new version were the characters Chairry, the Flowers, Mr. Window, Globey, Conky the Robot (known as Conky 3000, originally known as Conky 2000), Magic Screen, and King of Cartoons from the TV series.

The revival production was produced by Scott Sanders, directed by Alex Timbers, with scenic design by David Korins and Gary Panter and original music by Jay Cotton.

After several previews that began October 26, 2010, the production opened on Broadway at the Stephen Sondheim Theatre on November 11, 2010, playing a limited engagement through January 2, 2011. The Broadway production was produced by Scott Sanders Productions, Adam S. Gordon, Allan S. Gordon, Élan V. McAllister, Roy Miller, Carol R. Fineman, Scott Zeilinger Productions/Radio Mouse Entertainment and StylesFour Productions/Randy Donaldson/Tim Laczynski, with associate producers Jared Geller, David J. Foster, Anne Caruso and Kelly Bush. The production was recorded for an HBO special, The Pee-wee Herman Show on Broadway, which premiered on March 19, 2011.

=== Production Casts ===
==== Los Angeles (2009–2010) ====
- Pee-wee Herman – Paul Reubens
- Mailman Mike – John Moody
- Jambi – John Paragon
- Miss Yvonne – Lynne Marie Stewart
- Cowboy Curtis – Phil LaMarr
- Sergio – Jesse Garcia
- Fireman Phineas – Josh Meyers
- Bear – Drew Powell
- King of Cartoons – Lance Roberts
- Other voices by Lori Alan

==== Broadway (2010) ====
- Pee-wee Herman – Paul Reubens
- Mailman Mike – John Moody
- Jambi / Pterri – John Paragon
- Miss Yvonne – Lynne Marie Stewart
- Cowboy Curtis – Phil LaMarr
- Sergio – Jesse Garcia
- Fireman Phineas / Conky / Clockey / Fish / Randy / Shamwow – Josh Meyers
- Bear / Mr. Window / Randy / Flowers – Drew Powell
- King of Cartoons / Globey / Flowers / Mr. Knucklehead – Lance Roberts
- Chairry / Magic Screen / Ginger / Fish / Flowers – Lexy Fridell
