= Cheech and Chong's Next Movie =

1980 film by Cheech and Chong

- Theatrical release poster
- Directed by: Tommy Chong
- Written by: Tommy Chong; Cheech Marin
- Produced by: Howard Brown
- Starring: Cheech Marin; Tommy Chong
- Cinematography: King Baggot; Nick McLean
- Edited by: Thomas K. Avildsen; Scott Conrad
- Music by: Mark Davis
- Color process: Technicolor
- Production companies: Universal Pictures; C & C Brown Productions, Inc.
- Distributed by: Universal Pictures
- Release date: July 18, 1980
- Running time: 94 minutes
- Country: United States
- Language: English
- Box office: $41.7 million

Cheech and Chong's Next Movie is a 1980 American stoner comedy film directed by Tommy Chong and the second feature-length project by Cheech & Chong, following Up in Smoke, released by Universal Pictures.

== Plot ==
Cheech & Chong are on a mission to siphon gasoline for their next door neighbor's car, which they apparently "borrowed," and continue with their day; Cheech goes to work at a movie studio and Chong searches for something to smoke (a roach), followed by him revving up an indoor motorcycle and playing extremely loud rock music with an electric guitar that disturbs the entire neighborhood. Cheech gets fired from his job for taking one of the studio vans home without permission and they go to see Donna, a welfare officer and Cheech's off and on girlfriend. Cheech successfully seduces Donna, under her objections, and gets her in trouble (and possibly fired) with her boss. The doped-up duo are expelled from the building and, in an attempt to find alternative means of income, start writing songs like, "Mexican Americans" and "Beaners."

Cheech answers the phone call from Donna, sets up a date, and goes to tell Chong to get lost so he can clean the house and get ready for Donna. The phone rings again with Cheech thinking it's Donna and turns out to be Red, Cheech's "kinda" cousin, with money problems and a plea for help. Cheech asks Chong to pick up his cousin and hang out with him as Cheech informs him they have similar interests like "go to clubs," "get plenty of chicks," and "likes to get high." Chong heads off to the hotel where Red is staying and arrives to find him in a dispute with the receptionist over how much the room is costing ("$37.50 a week, not a goddamned day!"). The receptionist is holding his luggage, consisting of a boom-box, a suitcase, and a 20-pound canvas bag full of high-grade marijuana hostage, and Red can't afford the bill. They break into the room around the back and Red retrieves his luggage and the receptionist is falsely arrested after calling the cops to arrest Chong and Red but accidentally assaults them and is taken away to jail.

Later, on the corner, a roller-skater invites them to a "party," which is in fact a brothel. They are kicked out of the place for causing too much commotion, sharing weed with the girls, and urinating in the Jacuzzi. They then play a recording from Red's boombox that Red recorded earlier when the police arrived at the hotel he was staying at over the dispute with his luggage, which scares everyone off. One of the girls from the brothel accompanies them and they all go onto Sunset Boulevard in search of adventure and more highness. After visiting the house of a girl's parents, whom they found at a music store on Ventura Boulevard, they all get into the parents' Rolls-Royce, light up a spliff, and drive to a stand-up comedy club where they tell jokes and encounter the angry hotel receptionist who was falsely arrested earlier that day and begin a commotion with him and a large female bouncer leading to a rally fight. Later that night, they are chased by the cops as they check out Red's weed fields out in the countryside. They set off fireworks and are suddenly abducted by a UFO along with several of the cannabis plants. Cheech meanwhile gets so pumped and excited about the date that he wears himself out and ends up sleeping through it, while dreaming about what might have happened. He wakes up in the morning to find Chong (who was abducted by aliens alongside Red) bursting in, dressed as what appears to be a cross between Genghis Khan and a Viking, holding a jar of "space coke", which Chong says, "It'll blow your head off." The "space coke" causes Cheech to go berserk and starts trashing their next door neighbor's house with a surprised Chong following after. The film ends with the duo bursting through their neighbor's roof into outer space, achieving the ultimate high and Chong dropping the "space coke" back to Earth for others to try which leads to an animated sequence with Cheech and Chong ascending into a blunt which then takes off displaying the caption "That's It Man!"

== Cast ==
- Cheech Marin as Cheech / Dwayne 'Red' Mendoza
- Tommy Chong as Chong
- Evelyn Guerrero as Donna
- Paul Reubens as Desk Clerk / Pee-Wee Herman
- Betty Kennedy as Candy
- Sy Kramer as Mr. Neatnik
- Rikki Marin as Gloria
- Edie McClurg as Gloria's Mother
- Bob McClurg as Charlie "Chicken Charlie"
- John Paragon as Director
- Jake Steinfeld as Wamba
- Cassandra Peterson and Rita Wilson as Hostages
- Michael Winslow as Welfare Comedian
- John Steadman as Welfare Drunk
- Faith Minton as Lady Bouncer
- Ben Powers as Welfare Black
- Carl Weintraub as Hotel Cop
- Lupe M. Ontiveros as Old Lady

== Release ==
=== Television edit ===
The television edit of the film, in addition to being edited for content such as the removal of all sequences in which characters are seen smoking cannabis, contained many extended and additional scenes, and alternate dialogue, as well as a different music score.

The opening credits animated sequence was different from the theatrical cut, showing Cheech and Chong stealing their neighbor's car, which runs out of gas. It also features a theme song which didn't appear in the theatrical cut which removes Nick McLean's co-credit as director of photography and replaces the theatrical's “written by” credit for Cheech & Chong with a “screenplay by” credit (for Cheech & Chong) and adds a “story by” credit for Cheech & Chong and Francesca Turner. After the opening credits, there is a scene which did not appear in the theatrical cut establishing that extraterrestrials have come to Earth looking for diamonds, "the principal source of energy" on the planet Asp (the shot of the flying saucer, whick looks different from all other exterior shots of it, flying toward the camera and the following shot of it nearing Earth's atmosphere is footage lifted from The Thing, also a Universal movie). The usual “edited for television” caption is shown, adding that it has also been reconstructed as well. After Cheech and Chong siphon gas for their neighbor's car, insert shots underneath the hood are seen, showing the gas leaking and then igniting into flames, rather than the explosion being caused by Chong lighting a match inside the car. Cheech and Chong are said to be running a teen center and playground, which is referenced throughout the television edit, and a sign for it is shown repeatedly as part of the filler material shot for this version. Cheech and Chong's neighbor is shown to have a job as a piano teacher, and a lesson he is giving to a neighborhood teenager is interrupted by Chong's guitar playing. After the prop slot machine Cheech stole from a movie set falls on the neighbor, and they lift it off him, he threatens to sue them, claiming that the prop injured his hands, which would prevent him from playing the piano as part of his job, but offers to call off the lawsuit if Cheech and Chong let him have the rare costumes Cheech stole from the movie studio. Instead of teaching Chong the phrase "hey, pendejo", the line is redubbed as "hey, paisano". After Cheech sends Chong to pick up Red at the hotel so Cheech can spend the evening with Donna, there is an additional scene of Cheech cleaning the house, and Chong attempts to steal the neighbor's car again while he is working on it, but decides to hitchhike instead when he realizes that the car is not moving and he finds the neighbor underneath the car, apparently unconscious from the running car's fumes. While cleaning, Cheech is interrupted by Jehovah's witnesses, and slams the door in their face.

When he's calling the police, the hotel receptionist's line "Look, I think they're Iranians!" was redubbed as "Look, I think they're communists!" The extraterrestrials are then shown to be following Red in the hopes that he will lead them to "the diamond field"; after Red's duffel bag is retrieved, a different cutaway shot is shown depicting the inside of the bag as containing diamonds, not cannabis buds. Before the music store scene, there is an additional shot of a spaceship and an additional scene featuring a street musician. The music store scene is also extended, showing more of Red playing guitar and throwing guitars to the other customers. The scene where they get into Gloria's car still shows the store owner follow them out, complaining about the damage they caused, omitting the part where Red and Chong give the store owner armfuls of marijuana to compensate for the damage. The omission is covered by another close up of Gloria, yet the owner is still shown standing at the curb holding the marijuana as they drive off, and omits the police's arrival and subsequent arrest of the owner. There are different shots of the scene where they are introduced as the Cowardly Lion, Glinda, and Toto focusing on Edie McClurg's character rather than the medium long shot. There's an additional scene where the group has a dinner and uncomfortable conversation before they move into the living room, where Gloria sings the Jimmy Reed song "Baby What You Want Me to Do". In the living room, instead of performing the dirty magic trick, Red instead suggests that they drive to The Comedy House. This edit removed Charlie's wife smoking cannabis in the car. When Red performs the Mexico joke at The Comedy House, the line "donkey's balls" is redubbed as "donkey's tail". When Chong gets on the stage, the sequence in which he repeats Red's magic trick of turning a glass "into a dick" is removed, and there is an alternate scene in which Chong hits the large female wrestler on the head to no effect; she does not break the glass.

When Red and Chong are abducted by the extraterrestrials, additional dialogue is dubbed in, and there is an additional scene with Red and Chong on the space ship, where the extraterrestrials tell Red and Chong that they will teach them to "fly like Peter Pan" in order to retrieve diamonds for them. When Chong is back on Earth talking to Cheech at the end, the dialogue is completely redubbed, removing the references to "space coke", and instead having Chong telling Cheech that the extraterrestrials taught him how to fly; we are still inexplicably shown the footage of Cheech rampaging through the wall of their house and the neighbor's, Chong still following him carrying the beaker of space coke and the shot of Cheech blasting them through the roof (despite not being taught to fly yet). In the theatrical cut, this was a result of Cheech trying the space coke and the effect it had on him, but with the removal of the space coke references, this makes no sense. The edit ends with an extended animated sequence in which Cheech and Chong fly into space to join Red on the spaceship and an extraterrestrial superhero plays guitar before turning into a dragon, and the Cheech and Chong Teen Center and Playground sign is shown one final time before the credits roll, as we hear Red laughing and asking, "ya get it?"

=== Home media ===
A novelization was released in 1980.

The film was released on Blu-ray in 2017, containing the theatrical cut, trailer, radio spots and an interview with Cheech Marin. It did not include the television cut of the film or any deleted scenes.

=== Critical reception ===
Roger Ebert's review was negative, writing: "This movie is embarrassing. There's no invention in it, no imagination, no new comic vision, no ideas about what might be really funny -- instead of just dope-funny, something to laugh at if you're in the bag anyway." Gene Siskel gave the film two-and-a-half stars out of four and wrote that it was "much better" than Up in Smoke, "which isn't saying that much. It's just that its jokes come a little quicker and a few of them are funny even to the chemically unaltered viewer."

Vincent Canby of The New York Times wrote that the film was "casual, slapdash and rude, and it's frequently hilarious in the way of some intense but harmless confrontation between eccentrics on a street corner." Variety called the film "a laborious disappointment in which the freshness has vanished and the laughs come few and far between."

Metacritic, which uses a weighted average, assigned the film a score of 66 out of 100, based on 10 critics, indicating "generally favorable" reviews.
