= Michael Varhol =

American screenwriter

Michael Varhol is a screenwriter and film producer. He is most notable for his work on Pee-wee's Big Adventure and The Big Picture. His first film Banjoman (1976) was co-directed and co-produced with Richard G. Abramson. His "Central Park: the Soul of New York City" won the photography competition at the 2018 Big Apple Film Festival. He has been working on documenting the street art and street scene on Melrose Avenue in Los Angeles for over a decade.
