= Diane Salinger =

American actress

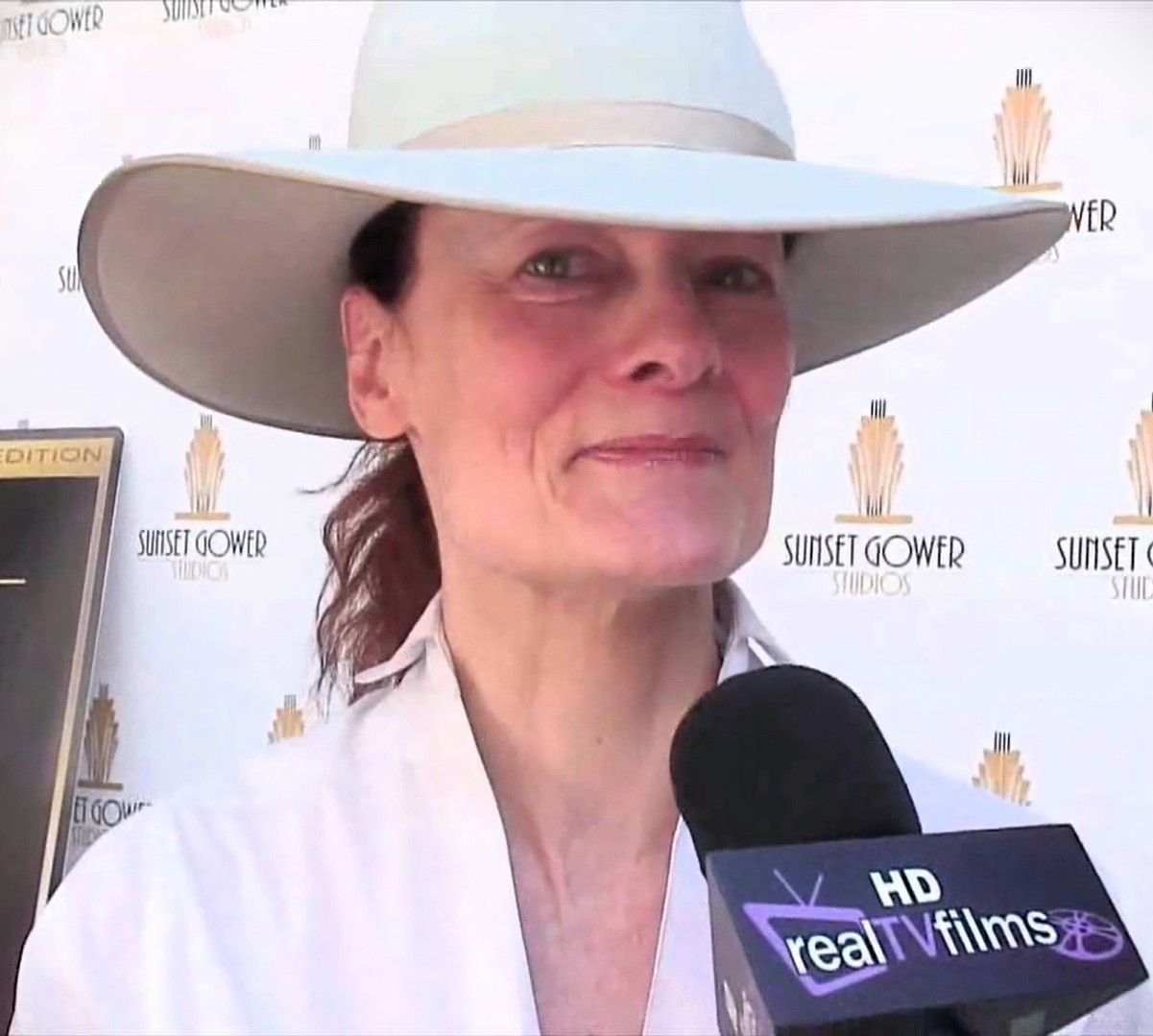
- Salinger in 2009
- Occupation: Actress
- Years active: 1985–present

Diane Louise Salinger is an American actress. She is best known for her role as Apollonia in Carnivàle (2003–2005).

== Career ==
Salinger's work on stage included portraying Tallulah Bankhead in Looped and D in Phantasie.

== Filmography ==
Key
| † | Denotes projects that have not yet been released |

=== Film ===
| Year | Film | Role | Notes |
|---|---|---|---|
| 1985 | Creature | Melanie Bryce | |
| 1985 | Pee-wee's Big Adventure | Simone | |
| 1986 | The Morning After | Isabel Harding | |
| 1987 | The Verne Miller Story | Mortician's Wife | |
| 1987 | Right to Die | Betsy | TV film |
| 1988 | Bird | Baroness Nica | |
| 1988 | Maybe Baby | Dr. Strauss | TV film |
| 1988 | Street of Dreams | Anne Kepler | TV film |
| 1990 | Alice | Carol | |
| 1991 | The Butcher's Wife | Trendoid | |
| 1992 | Stormy Weathers | Bogey | TV film |
| 1992 | Batman Returns | Ester Cobblepot | |
| 1992 | Venice/Venice | Stephanie | |
| 1992 | Unbecoming Age | Julia | |
| 1992 | Battle in the Erogenous Zone | Datemaster 2000 | TV film |
| 1995 | One Night Stand | Barbara Joslyn | |
| 1995 | Last Summer in the Hamptons | Marian Mora Garfield | |
| 1995 | The Scarlet Letter | Margaret Bellingham | |
| 1996 | Guy | Gail | |
| 1999 | The Kid with X-ray Eyes | Vanessa | Direct-to-video |
| 1999 | The Auteur Theory | Jane Holmes-Caprice | |
| 2001 | Ghost World | Psychiatrist | |
| 2001 | Almost a Woman | Mrs. Moore | TV film |
| 2005 | Love's Long Journey | Barbara Taylorson | TV film |
| 2006 | Rest Stop | Mother | Direct-to-video |
| 2007 | Color Me Olsen | Dorothy | Short film |
| 2008 | 20 Years After | Margaret | |
| 2008 | Rest Stop: Don't Look Back | Mother | Direct-to-video |
| 2009 | The Telling | Alina | Direct-to-video |
| 2009 | Dark House | Mrs. Darrode | |
| 2010 | Dante's Inferno: Abandon All Hope | Speaker | Short film |
| 2010 | Queen of the Lot | Hildi | |
| 2011 | Terri | Mrs. Vick | |
| 2012 | Just 45 Minutes from Broadway | Vivien Cooper Isaacs | |
| 2013 | First Period | Ms. Mallow | |
| 2013 | Stitch | Landlady | |
| 2014 | Freedom | Fanny | |
| 2014 | Model Citizen | Marie Everhart | TV film |
| 2015 | No Deposit | Gloria Markovitz | |
| 2015 | Forever | Hilary | |
| 2015 | Ovation | Hildi | |
| 2016 | Pee-wee's Big Holiday | Penny King | |
| 2016 | All Hallows' Eve | Delayna Hallow | |
| 2018 | Slay Belles | Cherry | |
| 2023 | Dante's Hell† | Speaker - 6th Circle: The Heretics and Medusa | Post-production |
| TBC | Things Like This† | Darlene Bat | Post-production |

=== Television ===
| Year | Film | Role | Notes |
|---|---|---|---|
| 1985 | George Burns Comedy Week | | Episode: "The Assignment" |
| 1986 | On Wings of Eagles | Emily Gaylord | Mini-series, 2 episodes |
| 1987 | St. Elsewhere | Valerie Ives | Episode: "Handoff" |
| 1989 | A Man Called Hawk | Dr. Kelford | Episode: "Life After Death" |
| 1990 | Law & Order | Eugenia Rawlings | Episode: "Indifference" |
| 1991 | L.A. Law | Paige Lockhart | Episode: "Mutinies on the Banzai" |
| 1992 | Mann & Machine | Dr. Vanbiesbrouck | Episode: "Mann's Fate" |
| 1992 | Civil Wars | Selene Gutbaum | Episode: "Devil's Advocate" |
| 1994 | Murder, She Wrote | Sondra Arthur | Episode: "Portrait of Death" |
| 1995 | NYPD Blue | Bea Duffy | Episode: "The Bank Dick" |
| 1995 | Star Trek: Deep Space Nine | Lupaza | Episode: "Shakaar" |
| 1996 | Women: Stories of Passion | Madelaine | Episode: "As Always, Madelaine" |
| 1997 | Star Trek: Deep Space Nine | Lupaza | Episode: "The Darkness and The Light" |
| 1998 | ER | Sophie's Mom | Episode: "Exodus" |
| 1998 | Silk Stalkings | Dorothy Beinhorn | Episode: "Hidden Agenda" |
| 2000 | The Others | Karen | Episode: "Souls on Board" |
| 2000 | Power Rangers Lightspeed Rescue | Queen Bansheera (voice) | Series regular, 19 episodes |
| 2002 | Strong Medicine | Diane Winston | Episode: "Admissions" |
| 2002 | Charmed | Sea Hag | Episode: "A Witch's Tail" |
| 2002 | Curb Your Enthusiasm | Deborah's Mom | Episode: "The Benadryl Brownie" |
| 2003-2005 | Carnivàle | Apollonia | Series regular, 18 episodes |
| 2006 | How I Met Your Mother | Dr. Aurelia | Episode: "Life Among the Gorillas" |
| 2008 | The Young and the Restless | Jamie | Recurring role, 4 episodes |
| 2009 | CSI: Crime Scene Investigation | Hilda Morton | Episode: "Kill Me if You Can" |
| 2014 | Salem | Rose | Recurring role, 4 episodes |
| 2021 | Ronstadt | The Lonely Woman | Recurring role, 2 episodes |

=== Video games ===
- The Elder Scrolls V: Skyrim (2011)
