= 1982–83 United States network television schedule (daytime) =

The following is the 1982–83 daytime network television schedule for the three major English-language commercial broadcast networks in the United States. It covers the weekday and weekend daytime hours from September 1982 to August 1983.

== Legend ==
- Light yellow indicates talk shows.
- Green indicates soap operas.
- Pink indicates game shows.
- Gold indicates news and public affairs programming.
- Light teal indicates sporting events.
- White indicates local programming.
- Light purple indicates children's programming.
- Gray indicates encore programming (e.g., reruns of prime-time programming).
- New series are highlighted in **bold**.

== Schedule ==
- All times correspond to U.S. Eastern and Pacific Time scheduling (except for some live sports or events). Except where affiliates slot certain programs outside their network-dictated timeslots, subtract one hour for Central, Mountain, Alaska, and Hawaii-Aleutian times.
- Local schedules may differ, as affiliates have the option to pre-empt or delay network programs. Such scheduling may be limited to preemptions caused by local or national breaking news or weather coverage (which may force stations to tape delay certain programs to other timeslots) and any major sports events scheduled to air in a weekday timeslot (mainly during major holidays). Stations may air shows at other times at their preference.

=== Monday–Friday ===
| Network | | 6:00 am | 6:30 am | 7:00 am | 7:30 am | 8:00 am | 8:30 am | 9:00 am | 9:30 am | 10:00 am | 10:30 am | 11:00 am | 11:30 am | noon | 12:30 pm | 1:00 pm | 1:30 pm | 2:00 pm | 2:30 pm | 3:00 pm | 3:30 pm | 4:00 pm | 4:30 pm | 5:00 pm | 5:30 pm | 6:00 pm | 6:30 pm |
|---|---|---|---|---|---|---|---|---|---|---|---|---|---|---|---|---|---|---|---|---|---|---|---|---|---|---|---|
| ABC | Fall | ABC World News This Morning | | Good Morning America | | | | Local/syndicated programming | | | | The Love Boat | | Family Feud | Ryan's Hope FYI (12:58) | All My Children | | One Life to Live FYI (2:58) | | General Hospital FYI (3:58) | | The Edge of Night | Local/syndicated programming | | | | ABC World News Tonight |
| ABC | Summer | ABC World News This Morning | | Good Morning America | | | | Local/syndicated programming | | | | **Too Close for Comfort** | **Loving** | Family Feud | Ryan's Hope FYI (12:58) | All My Children | | One Life to Live FYI (2:58) | | General Hospital FYI (3:58) | | The Edge of Night | Local/syndicated programming | | | | ABC World News Tonight |
| CBS | Fall | Local/syndicated programming | **CBS Early Morning News** | The CBS Morning News | | | | Local/syndicated programming | | **The $25,000 Pyramid** | **Child's Play** | The Price Is Right CBS News Newsbreak (11:57) | | Local/syndicated programming | The Young and the Restless | | As the World Turns | | Capitol | Guiding Light CBS News Newsbreak (3:57) | | Tattletales | Local/syndicated programming | | | | CBS Evening News with Dan Rather |
| CBS | November | Local/syndicated programming | **CBS Early Morning News** | The CBS Morning News | | | | Local/syndicated programming | | **The New $25,000 Pyramid** | **Child's Play** | The Price Is Right CBS News Newsbreak (11:57) | | Local/syndicated programming | The Young and the Restless | | As the World Turns | | Capitol | Guiding Light CBS News Newsbreak (3:57) | | Tattletales | Local/syndicated programming | | | | CBS Evening News with Dan Rather |
| NBC | Fall | Early Today | | Today | | | | Local/syndicated programming | | Diff'rent Strokes | Wheel of Fortune | Texas | | The Doctors | Search for Tomorrow | Days of Our Lives | | Another World | | **Fantasy** | | Local/syndicated programming | | | | | NBC Nightly News |
| NBC | Winter | Early Today | | Today | | | | Local/syndicated programming | | **The Facts of Life** | **Sale of the Century** | Wheel of Fortune | **Hit Man** | **Just Men!** | Search for Tomorrow | Days of Our Lives | | Another World | | **Fantasy** | | Local/syndicated programming | | | | | NBC Nightly News |
| NBC | Spring | Early Today | | Today | | | | Local/syndicated programming | | **The Facts of Life** | **Sale of the Century** | Wheel of Fortune | **Dream House** | **The New Battlestars** | Search for Tomorrow | Days of Our Lives | | Another World | | **Fantasy** | | Local/syndicated programming | | | | | NBC Nightly News |
| NBC | Summer | Local/syndicated programming | **NBC News at Sunrise** (August) | Today | | | | Local/syndicated programming | | Diff'rent Strokes | **Sale of the Century** | Wheel of Fortune | **Dream House** | The Facts of Life | Search for Tomorrow | Days of Our Lives | | Another World | | **Fantasy** | | Local/syndicated programming | | | | | NBC Nightly News |

Notes

- Sunrise Semester and Captain Kangaroo both left the weekday schedule on CBS on October 1, 1982. Captain Kangaroo moved to Saturday and Sunday mornings and reverted to a one-hour format.
- Texas and The Doctors both ended their runs on NBC on December 31, 1982.

=== Saturday ===
| Network | | 7:00 am | 7:30 am | 8:00 am | 8:30 am | 9:00 am | 9:30 am | 10:00 am | 10:30 am | 11:00 am | 11:30 am | noon | 12:30 pm | 1:00 pm | 1:30 pm | 2:00 pm | 2:30 pm | 3:00 pm | 3:30 pm | 4:00 pm | 4:30 pm | 5:00 pm | 5:30 pm | 6:00 pm | 6:30 pm |
|---|---|---|---|---|---|---|---|---|---|---|---|---|---|---|---|---|---|---|---|---|---|---|---|---|---|
| ABC | Fall | Local and/or syndicated programming | | The Best of the Super Friends Schoolhouse Rock! (8:25) | **The Pac-Man/Little Rascals/Richie Rich Show** | | | **Mork & Mindy/Laverne & Shirley/Fonz Hour** Schoolhouse Rock! (10:55) | | **The Scooby & Scrappy-Doo/Puppy Hour** Schoolhouse Rock! (11:55) | | ABC Weekend Special | American Bandstand | | ABC Sports and/or local programming | | | | | | | | | Local news | ABC World News Saturday |
| ABC | January | Local and/or syndicated programming | | The Best of the Super Friends Schoolhouse Rock! (8:25) | **The Pac-Man/Little Rascals/Richie Rich Show** | | | The Scooby-Doo/Puppy Hour Schoolhouse Rock! (10:55) | | Mork & Mindy/Laverne & Shirley/Fonz Hour Schoolhouse Rock! (11:55) | | ABC Weekend Special | American Bandstand | | ABC Sports and/or local programming | | | | | | | | | Local news | ABC World News Saturday |
| CBS | Fall | Captain Kangaroo | | Speed Buggy (R) | **Sylvester & Tweety, Daffy, and Speedy Show** | | The Bugs Bunny/Road Runner Show | | **Gilligan's Planet** | **Pandamonium** | **Meatballs and Spaghetti** | The Popeye and Olive Comedy Show | The New Fat Albert Show | Blackstar | **CBS Saturday Film Festival** | CBS Sports and/or local programming | | | | | | | | Local news | CBS Evening News |
| CBS | November | Captain Kangaroo | | Speed Buggy (R) | Pandamonium | Gilligan's Planet | The Bugs Bunny/Road Runner Show | | | | **Meatballs and Spaghetti** | The Popeye and Olive Comedy Show | The New Fat Albert Show | Blackstar | **CBS Saturday Film Festival** | CBS Sports and/or local programming | | | | | | | | Local news | CBS Evening News |
| CBS | February | Captain Kangaroo | | The Popeye and Olive Comedy Show | Pandamonium | Meatballs and Spaghetti | The Bugs Bunny/Road Runner Show | | **The Dukes** | The Bugs Bunny/Road Runner Show | | Gilligan's Planet | The New Fat Albert Show | Blackstar | **CBS Saturday Film Festival** | CBS Sports and/or local programming | | | | | | | | Local news | CBS Evening News |
| NBC | Fall | Local and/or syndicated programming | | **The Flintstone Funnies** | **Shirt Tales** | The Smurfs | | | **The Gary Coleman Show** | **The Incredible Hulk** and the Amazing Spider-Man | | The Jetsons (R) | The New Adventures of Flash Gordon | NBC Sports and/or local programming | | | | | | | | | | Local news | NBC Nightly News |
| NBC | April | Local and/or syndicated programming | | **The Flintstone Funnies** | **Shirt Tales** | The Smurfs | | | **The Gary Coleman Show** | **The Incredible Hulk** and the Amazing Spider-Man | | Thundarr the Barbarian (R) | The New Adventures of Flash Gordon | NBC Sports and/or local programming | | | | | | | | | | Local news | NBC Nightly News |

In the News aired ten times during CBS' Saturday morning shows.

Ask NBC News aired after the credits of five NBC Saturday morning shows.

=== Sunday ===
| Network | | 7:00 am | 7:30 am | 8:00 am | 8:30 am | 9:00 am | 9:30 am | 10:00 am | 10:30 am | 11:00 am | 11:30 am | noon | 12:30 pm | 1:00 pm | 1:30 pm | 2:00 pm | 2:30 pm | 3:00 pm | 3:30 pm | 4:00 pm | 4:30 pm | 5:00 pm | 5:30 pm | 6:00 pm | 6:30 pm |
|---|---|---|---|---|---|---|---|---|---|---|---|---|---|---|---|---|---|---|---|---|---|---|---|---|---|
| ABC | | Local and/or syndicated programming | | | | | | | This Week with David Brinkley | | ABC Sports and/or local programming | | | | | | | | | | | | | Local news | ABC World News Sunday |
| CBS | Fall | Captain Kangaroo | | Tarzan and the Lone Ranger (R) | The Kwicky Koala Show (R) | CBS News Sunday Morning | | | Local and/or syndicated programming | | Face the Nation | Local and/or syndicated programming | The NFL Today | NFL on CBS and/or local programming | | | | | | | | | | | |
| CBS | Mid-winter | Captain Kangaroo | | Tarzan and the Lone Ranger (R) | The Kwicky Koala Show (R) | CBS News Sunday Morning | | | Local and/or syndicated programming | | Face the Nation | CBS Sports and/or local programming | | | | | | | | | | | | Local news | CBS Evening News |
| NBC | Fall | Local and/or syndicated programming | | | | | | | | | | Meet the Press | NFL '82 | NFL on NBC and local programming | | | | | | | | | | | |
| NBC | Mid-winter | Local and/or syndicated programming | | | | | | | | | | Meet the Press | NBC Sports and/or local programming | | | | | | | | | | | Local news | NBC Nightly News |

== By network ==
=== ABC ===
**Returning series**

- ABC Weekend Special
- ABC World News This Morning
- ABC World News Tonight
- All My Children
- American Bandstand
- The Best of the Super Friends
- The Edge of Night
- Family Feud
- General Hospital
- Good Morning America
- The Love Boat (reruns)
- One Life to Live
- Ryan's Hope
- Schoolhouse Rock!
- This Week with David Brinkley

**New series**

- **Loving**
- **Mork & Mindy/Laverne & Shirley/Fonz Hour**
- **The Pac-Man/Little Rascals/Richie Rich Show**
- **The Puppy's New Adventures**
- **The Scooby & Scrappy-Doo/Puppy Hour**
- **Too Close For Comfort** (reruns)

**Canceled/Ended**

- Animals, Animals, Animals
- The Fonz and the Happy Days Gang
- Goldie Gold and Action Jack
- Heathcliff & Marmaduke
- Issues and Answers
- Kids Are People Too
- Laverne & Shirley in the Army
- The Richie Rich/Scooby-Doo Show
- Thundarr the Barbarian

=== CBS ===
**Returning series**

- The $25,000 Pyramid
- As the World Turns
- Blackstar (reruns)
- The Bugs Bunny/Road Runner Show
- Capitol
- Captain Kangaroo
- CBS Children's Film Festival
- CBS Evening News
- CBS Morning News
- CBS News Sunday Morning
- Face the Nation
- Guiding Light
- The New Fat Albert Show
- The Kwicky Koala Show (reruns)
- The Popeye and Olive Comedy Show
- The Price Is Right
- Speed Buggy (reruns)
- Sunrise Semester
- Tattletales
- The Young and the Restless

**New series**

- **Child's Play**
- **The Dukes**
- **Gilligan's Planet**
- **Meatballs and Spaghetti**
- **The New $25,000 Pyramid**
- **Pandamonium**
- **Sylvester & Tweety, Daffy, and Speedy Show**

**Canceled/Ended**

- 30 Minutes
- Alice (reruns)
- Drak Pack (reruns)
- The New Adventures of Mighty Mouse and Heckle and Jeckle (reruns)
- One Day at a Time (reruns)
- Search for Tomorrow (moved to NBC)
- The Tarzan/Lone Ranger/Zorro Adventure Hour
- The Tom and Jerry Comedy Show
- Trollkins

=== NBC ===
**Returning series**

- Another World
- Days of Our Lives
- Diff'rent Strokes (reruns)
- The Doctors
- The Jetsons (reruns)
- Meet the Press
- NBC Nightly News
- The New Adventures of Flash Gordon
- Sale of the Century
- Search for Tomorrow
- The Smurfs
- Spider-Man and His Amazing Friends
- Texas
- Thundarr the Barbarian (reruns)
- Today
- Wheel of Fortune

**New series**

- **Dream House**
- **The Facts of Life** (reruns)
- **Fantasy**
- **The Flintstone Funnies**
- **The Gary Coleman Show**
- **Hit Man**
- **The Incredible Hulk**
- **Just Men!**
- **NBC News at Sunrise**
- **The New Battlestars**
- **Shirt Tales**

**Canceled/Ended**

- Battlestars
- Blockbusters (revived in 1986-87)
- The Bullwinkle Show (reruns)
- CHiPs (reruns)
- The Daffy/Speedy Show
- The Flintstones Comedy Show (reruns)
- The Kid Super Power Hour with Shazam!
- Gambit (renamed Las Vegas Gambit)
- Password Plus
- The Regis Philbin Show
- Space Stars

== See also ==
- 1982-83 United States network television schedule (prime-time)
- 1982-83 United States network television schedule (late night)

== Sources ==
- https://web.archive.org/web/20071015122215/http://curtalliaume.com/abc_day.html
- https://web.archive.org/web/20071015122235/http://curtalliaume.com/cbs_day.html
- https://web.archive.org/web/20071012211242/http://curtalliaume.com/nbc_day.html
