= List of animated spinoffs from prime time shows =

This is a list of live action prime time television shows that were spun off into animated series.

Prime time show	Cartoon version	Original network	Year	Ref.
The Addams Family	The Addams Family	NBC	1973	
The Addams Family	The Addams Family	ABC	1992–1993	
ALF	ALF: The Animated Series	NBC	1987–1989	
ALF	ALF Tales	NBC	1988–1989	
Bewitched	Tabitha and Adam and the Clown Family	ABC	1972	
The Brady Bunch	The Brady Kids	ABC	1972–1974	
Carrossel	Carrossel	SBT	2016–present	
Corner Gas	Corner Gas Animated	CTV	2018–2021	
The Dick Van Dyke Show	The Alan Brady Show	CBS & TV Land	2003	
Doctor Who	Scream of the Shalka	BBC	2003	
Doctor Who	The Infinite Quest	BBC	2007	
Doctor Who	Dreamland	BBC	2009	
The Dukes of Hazzard	The Dukes	CBS	1983–1984	
El Chapulín Colorado	El Chapulín Colorado Animado	Canal de las Estrellas	2015	
El Chavo del Ocho	El Chavo Animado	Canal 5	2006–2014	
Emergency!	Emergency +4	NBC	1973–1974	
Fraggle Rock	Fraggle Rock: The Animated Series	NBC	1987–1988	
Gidget	Gidget Makes the Wrong Connection	ABC	1972	
Gilligan's Island	The New Adventures of Gilligan	ABC	1974–1975	
Gilligan's Island	Gilligan's Planet	CBS	1982–1983	
Happy Days	The Fonz and the Happy Days Gang	ABC	1980–1982	
Happy Days	Mork & Mindy/Laverne & Shirley/Fonz Hour	ABC	1982–1983	
Henry Danger	The Adventures of Kid Danger	Nickelodeon	2018	
Highlander: The Series	Highlander: The Animated Series	USA Network	1994–1995	
I Dream of Jeannie	Jeannie	CBS	1973–1975	
Laverne & Shirley	Laverne & Shirley in the Army	ABC	1981–1982	
Laverne & Shirley	Mork & Mindy/Laverne & Shirley/Fonz Hour	ABC	1982–1983	
Lost in Space	Lost in Space	ABC	1973	
Mork & Mindy	Mork & Mindy	ABC	1982–1983	
Mr. Bean	Mr. Bean: The Animated Series	ITV	2002–2003	
The Munsters	The Mini-Munsters	ABC	1973	
The Muppet Show	Muppet Babies	CBS	1984–1991	
The Muppet Show	Little Muppet Monsters	CBS	1985	
The Muppet Show	Muppet Babies	Disney Junior	2018–2022	
My Favorite Martian	My Favorite Martians	CBS	1973	
Nanny and the Professor	Nanny and the Professor	ABC	1972	
Nanny and the Professor	Nanny and the Professor and the Phantom of the Circus	ABC	1973	
The Odd Couple	The Oddball Couple	ABC	1975	
The Partridge Family	Goober and the Ghost Chasers	ABC	1973–1975	
The Partridge Family	Partridge Family 2200 A.D.	CBS	1974–1975	
Punky Brewster	It's Punky Brewster	NBC	1985–1986	
Rhoda	Carlton Your Doorman	CBS	1980	
Sabrina the Teenage Witch	Sabrina: The Animated Series	ABC & UPN	1999	
Second City Television	Bob & Doug	CBC (Note: Second City Television originated on Global but moved to CBC, and the Bob and Doug McKenzie characters originated on CBC prime time.) & Global	2009–2011	
Sit Down, Shut Up	Sit Down, Shut Up	Network 10 & Fox	2009	
Sítio do Pica-Pau Amarelo	Sítio do Pica-Pau Amarelo	Globo	2012–2016	
Star Trek	Star Trek: The Animated Series	NBC	1973–1974	
Star Trek	Star Trek: Lower Decks	CBS All Access	2020–	
Star Trek	Star Trek: Prodigy	Paramount+ & Nickelodeon	2021–	
Stargate SG-1	Stargate Infinity	Fox	2002–2003	
Stranger Things	Stranger Things: Tales from '85	Netflix	2026–	
Tales from the Crypt	Tales from the Cryptkeeper	ABC & CBS	1993–1997	
That Girl	That Girl in Wonderland	ABC	1973	
The Tracey Ullman Show	The Simpsons	Fox	1989–	
Trailer Park Boys	Trailer Park Boys: The Animated Series	Showcase & Netflix	2019–2020	
World Wrestling Federation programs	Hulk Hogan's Rock 'n' Wrestling	CBS	1985–1987	
World Wrestling Federation programs	WWE Slam City	WWE Network	2014	
World Wrestling Federation programs	Camp WWE	WWE Network	2016– 2018	

== See also ==
- Buffy: The Animated Series, an unproduced animated adaptation of Buffy the Vampire Slayer
