= Limited Engagement =

Limited Engagement may refer to:

- "Limited Engagement" (Magnum, P.I.), a 1983 television episode
- "Limited Engagement" (Mork & Mindy), a 1981 television episode
