= Elizabeth Kerr =

American actress (1912–2000)

- Kerr in The Betty White Show, 1977
- Born: August 15, 1912; Kansas City, Missouri, US
- Died: January 13, 2000 (aged 87)
- Occupation: Actor
- Years active: 1947–1991

Elizabeth Kerr (August 15, 1912 – January 13, 2000) was an American actress, theatre producer and director, perhaps best known for playing Cora Hudson in Mork & Mindy.

== Early years ==
Kerr was born in Kansas City, Missouri, the daughter of John and Anna Kerr. She attended Northwestern University and the University of Kansas. As a girl, she dreamed of being an actress, but family responsibilities prevented her from doing so until she was a grandmother. After she married, she wrote reviews of books and plays for the newspaper that she and her husband owned. She also read book reviews at meetings of women's clubs, which she said helped to prepare her for acting.

== Career ==
Kerr's acting career began at the Pasadena Playhouse. She was selected for a role there after her first audition, and in two years she became a professional.

Kerr's Broadway debut came in Angel in the Pawnshop (1951). Her other Broadway credits included The Conquering Hero (1961), Redhead (1959), and The Righteous Are Bold (1955). She also made national tours of a similar number of plays, besides performing in regional theatrical productions.

On television, Kerr played Mother Elliott in The Betty White Show, and Cora Hudson in Mork & Mindy.

Kerr also produced plays. She founded the Glendale Civic Theater in 1947 and launched the Resident Theater in North Hollywood in 1952. She also directed at the Resident Theater.
