= Lynne Marie Stewart =

American actress (1946–2025)

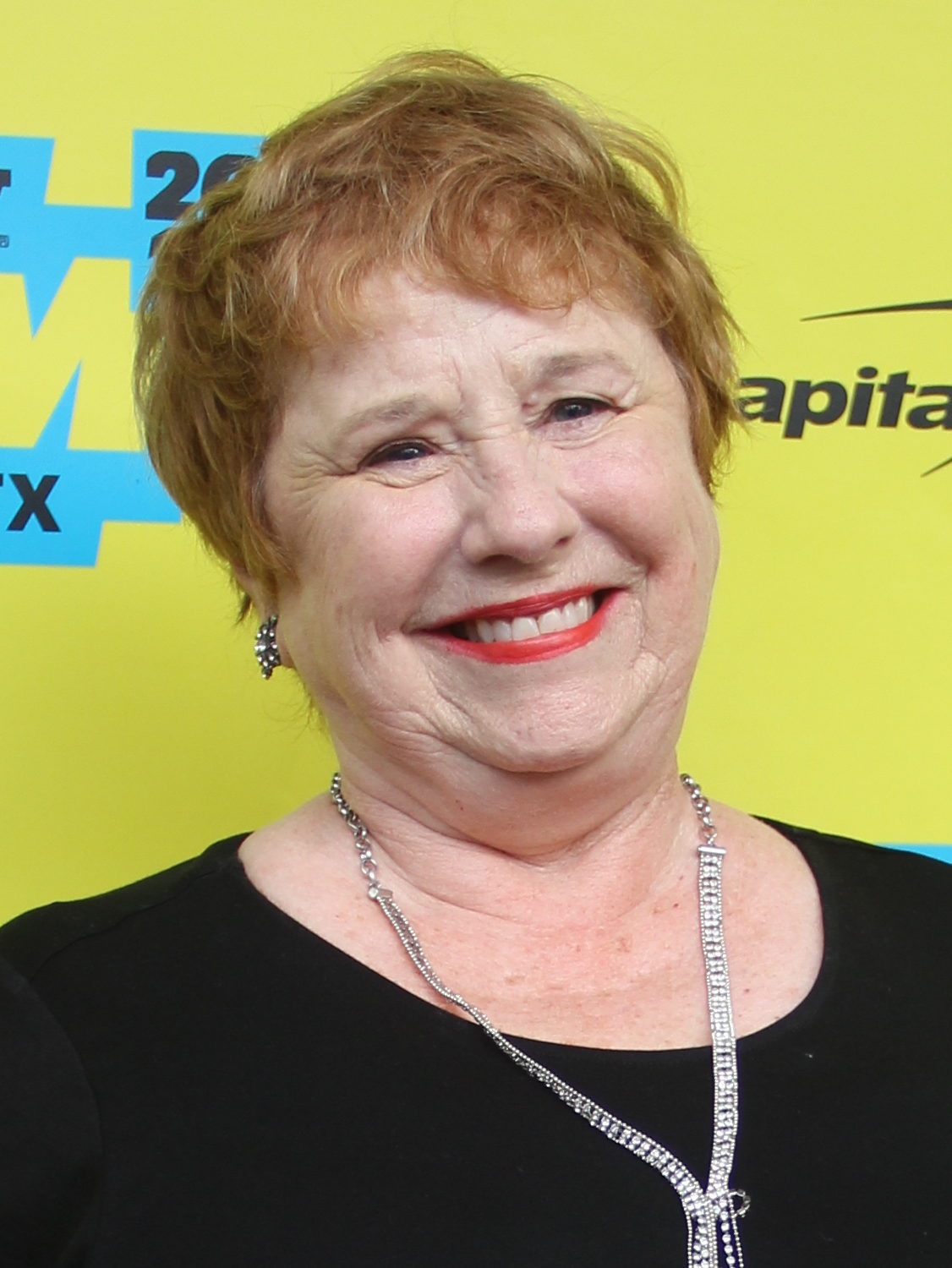
- Stewart in 2016
- Born: December 14, 1946; Lynwood, California, U.S.
- Died: February 21, 2025 (aged 78); Los Angeles, California, U.S.
- Occupation: Actress
- Years active: 1967–2025

Signature
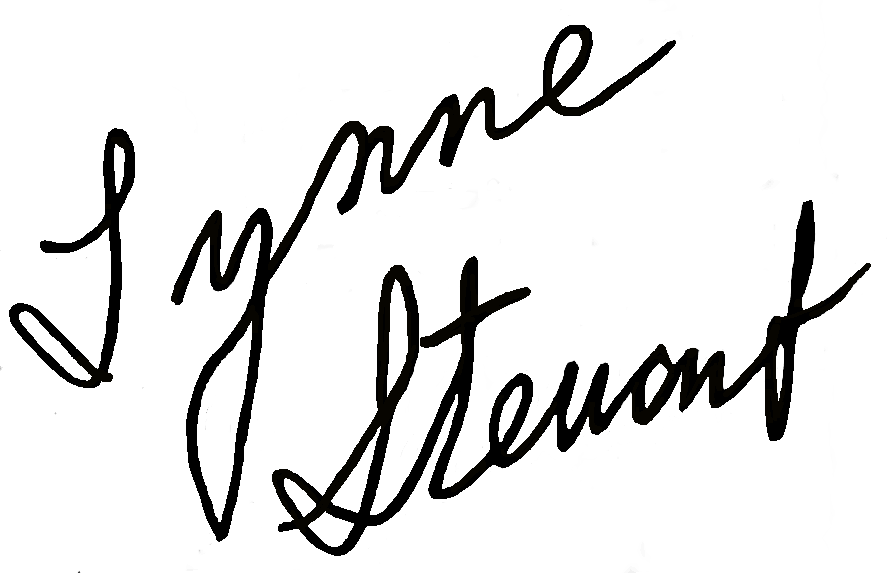

Lynne Marie Stewart (December 14, 1946 – February 21, 2025) was an American actress. She was widely known for her performance as Miss Yvonne, "the Most Beautiful Woman in Puppet Land," originating the role in the 1981 stage show The Pee-wee Herman Show. She continued to play Miss Yvonne on the CBS television show Pee-wee's Playhouse, the 2010 Los Angeles stage revival, and the Broadway production which opened in November 2010 at the Stephen Sondheim Theatre. Stewart was also known for her recurring role on the FX/FXX television series, It's Always Sunny in Philadelphia as Charlie Kelly's mother, Bonnie.

== Early life ==
Stewart was born in Lynwood, California, on December 14, 1946. Stewart majored in theater arts at Los Angeles City College, where she met her best friend, Cindy Williams.

== Career ==
Stewart was a member of The Groundlings in the 1970s, and met both Paul Reubens and Phil Hartman there.

Stewart played several different nurses on the television series M*A*S*H. She had a small part in the 1973 film American Graffiti as Bobbie, who drove the car of girls who pick up Curt (Richard Dreyfuss) in one scene. She played a variety of characters on Laverne & Shirley. She provided Shirley's voice in the Saturday morning cartoon Mork & Mindy/Laverne & Shirley/Fonz Hour and Laverne & Shirley in the Army. She worked with Tracey Ullman in specials for HBO and Showtime, including Tracey Ullman in the Trailer Tales and Tracey Ullman's State of the Union. Stewart appeared in the Alice episode titled "Single Belles". She played a nun in a season six episode of The Golden Girls.

She was part of the cast of Pee-wee's Playhouse as Miss Yvonne "the Most Beautiful Woman in Puppet Land". Her character was especially flirty and known for providing steamy adult-like humor to the children's show. Miss Yvonne's character was a woman obsessed with beauty and cosmetics, who often flirts with Pee-wee and many of the other male characters on the show. Miss Yvonne is given the title "the most beautiful woman in Puppetland" by the puppet characters (especially Mr. Window who would usually introduce her). She wears a large brown bouffant-style wig that she doesn't like getting wet, gaudy dresses, and heels. She originated the role in the 1981 stage show The Pee-wee Herman Show, continuing it on the CBS television show Pee-wee's Playhouse, the 2010 Los Angeles stage revival, and the Broadway production which opened in November 2010 at the Stephen Sondheim Theatre.

Stewart was featured in Pee-wee's Big Adventure and Big Top Pee-wee. She appeared in films and TV series including The Running Man, Night Stand with Dick Dietrick, and Son of the Beach. She appeared in the 2011 film Bridesmaids.

She appeared in Raising Hope, Marvin Marvin, and Comedy Bang! Bang!. She guest-starred on Disney TV shows, including Austin & Ally and Good Luck Charlie in 2011. Also in 2011, at the Surflight Theatre, in New Jersey, she appeared in an all-female version of The Odd Couple, starring Cindy Williams and Jo Anne Worley.

Beginning in 2005 and until 2025, Stewart had a guest role as Charlie's mom, Bonnie Kelly, on the long-running, critically acclaimed series It's Always Sunny in Philadelphia, appearing in a total of 19 episodes. The season finale of Season 17, in which Stewart made her final appearance as Bonnie, aired posthumously and was dedicated to her.

== Personal life ==
Stewart never married or had any children. She and Paul Reubens were active participants with the Make-a-Wish Foundation and often appeared in character as Miss Yvonne and Pee-wee to bring happiness to terminally ill children. She and Reubens remained "the closest of friends" until Reubens' death in 2023, with Stewart attending to Reubens shortly before he died.

=== Death ===
Stewart died in Los Angeles on February 21, 2025, at the age of 78 from cancer, which was found near her liver and gallbladder.

== Filmography ==
=== Film ===
Year	Title	Role	Notes
1971	Drive, He Said	Cheerleader	
1973	American Graffiti	Bobbie	
1973	Your Three Minutes Are Up	Ibis Lady	
1975	I Wonder Who's Killing Her Now?	Unknown	
1976	Tunnel Vision	Marie	
1977	I Never Promised You a Rose Garden	The Sisters	
1977	Cracking Up	Kiamoka Wang	
1978	Loose Shoes	Budget Attendant	
1980	The Last Married Couple in America	Receptionist	
1982	Pandemonium	Stewardess	
1982	Young Doctors in Love	Nurse Thatcher	
1984	Weekend Pass	Sookie Lane	
1985	Pee-wee's Big Adventure	Mother Superior	
1986	Children of a Lesser God	Announcer	
1986	Jumpin' Jack Flash	Karen	
1987	Summer School	Student	
1987	The Running Man	Edith Wiggins	
1988	Moving	Mrs. Seeger	
1988	Big Top Pee-wee	Zelda the Bearded Lady	
1988	Elvira: Mistress of the Dark	Bartender	
1988	Rain Man	Voice	
1989	Driving Miss Daisy	Additional voice	
1989	The 'Burbs	Voice-over actor	
1990	Payback	Dispatcher	
1992	Double Trouble	Policewoman	
1994	Clear and Present Danger	Greer's Secretary	
1994	The Crazysitter	The Vagrant	
1994	Twin Sitters	Homeless Woman	
1994	Independence Day	Woman Without a Child	Short film
1996	Dunston Checks In	Cucumber Woman	
1999	Valerie Flake	Aunt Gloria	
1999	Silicon Towers	Landlady	
1999	Guinevere	Nurse	
2002	Enough	Waitress	
2003	Beethoven's 5th	Rose Carter	Direct-to-video
2004	Meet the Fockers	ADR voice	
2004	50 Ways to Leave Your Lover	Roberta	
2006	Barnyard	Additional characters (voice)	
2007	Judy Toll: The Funniest Woman You've Never Heard Of	Herself	Documentary
2011	Bridesmaids	Lillian's Mom	
2013	Sparks	Sparks Grandmother	
2013	We've Got Balls	Grandma Jean	
2014	Bingo Night	Ethel	Short film
2016	Other People	Livia	
2016	Hickey	Shirley	
2016	Pee-wee's Big Holiday	Jimmy	
2016	Izzie's Way Home	Clara (voice)	
2016	Batman: Return of the Caped Crusaders	Aunt Harriet (voice)	
2017	Woman Child	Marcy Winecott	Short film
2017	Batman vs. Two-Face	Aunt Harriet (voice)	Direct-to-video
2026	The Dink	Judy	Final film role; Posthumous release

=== Television ===
Year(s)	Title	Role	Notes
1973	Temperatures Rising	Unknown	
1974	The F.B.I.	Jane	
1975	Karen	Bernice	
1975–1977	M*A*S*H	Various	5 episodes
1976	Hawaii Five-O	Woman Detective	
1977	Quincy, M.E.	Nurse	
1977	Alice	Woman #1	
1978	America 2-Night	Mary Marie Clark	
1978	Husbands, Wives & Lovers	Joy Bellini	
1978–1979	Laverne & Shirley	Various	7 episodes
1979	CHiPs	Nancy	
1981	The Pee-wee Herman Show	Miss Yvonne	HBO special
1981	The Richie Rich/Scooby-Doo Show	(voice)	
1982	The Mork & Mindy/Laverne & Shirley/Fonz Hour	Shirley Feeney (voice)	
1982	Laverne & Shirley in the Army	Shirley Feeney (voice)	
1982	Madame's Place	Sonoko / Lupe de Vega	
1982	One Day at a Time	The Real Estate Broker	
1983	The Jeffersons	Lucille (voice)	
1983–1985	Remington Steele	Receptionist / Teller	
1984	American Playhouse	Unknown	
1984	The Duck Factory	Unknown	
1984	Dynasty	Maid	
1985	Charlie & Co.	Molly	
1986–1991	Pee-wee's Playhouse	Miss Yvonne	
1987	Cinemax Comedy Experiment	Bev	
1988	Superman	Jessica Morganberry (voice)	
1988	A Pup Named Scooby-Doo	Additional voices	
1989	TV 101	Receptionist	
1989	Peaceable Kingdom	Mrs. Lupton	
1990	Night Court	Vanna Anders	
1990	The Golden Girls	Sister Anne	
1991	WIOU	Marriage Counselor	
1991	Empty Nest	Secretary	
1992	In the Heat of the Night	Woman on Bench	
1992	Batman: The Animated Series	Violet (voice)	
1992	Reasonable Doubts	Eugenia Petz	
1993	Family Dog	Additional voices	
1993	Herman's Head	Joan	
1995	Hope & Gloria	Margeurite	
1995	The Tick	Mona Lisa (voice)	
1995	Here Come the Munsters	Mrs. Waffer	TV movie
1995–1996	Night Stand with Dick Dietrick	Audience Member	
1996	Dream On	Dr. Esther	
1996	After Jimmy	Sanny	TV movie
1996–1997	Life with Louie	Kitty Grunewald (voice)	
1997	Suddenly Susan	Marion	
1997	Caroline in the City	Aunt Pat	
1997	The Secret World of Alex Mack	Nurse Bean	
1997	Alright Already	Barbara	
1997	Almost Perfect	Gladys	
1998	Working	Frieda	
1998	The Brian Benben Show	Janet	
1999	Lansky	Waitress at Wolfie's	TV movie
1999	Pirates of Silicon Valley	Bill's Secretary	TV movie
2000	Trial by Media	Woman in Grocery Store	TV movie
2000–2002	Son of the Beach	Ellen / Binaka	
2001	Spin City	Adoption Woman	
2002	The Brothers García	Ms. McNeal	
2003	Tracey Ullman in the Trailer Tales	Lynn	HBO special
2003	Rent Control	Aunt Agatha	TV movie
2003	According to Jim	Sister Eileen	
2004	Arrested Development	Joyce	
2004	Significant Others	Ethan's Mom	
2005	Grey's Anatomy	Nurse	
2005	The Bad Girl's Guide	Cathy	
2005	Curb Your Enthusiasm	Nurse in Nat's Room	
2005–2025	It's Always Sunny in Philadelphia	Bonnie Kelly	19 episodes
2007	American Body Shop	Lynn	
2010	Tracey Ullman's State of the Union	Make-up Artist #1 / Karen	
2011	The Pee-wee Herman Show on Broadway	Miss Yvonne	HBO special
2012	Austin & Ally	Miss Suzy	
2012	Good Luck Charlie	Grandma	
2013–2016	2 Broke Girls	June / Svetlana	
2013–2016	Comedy Bang! Bang!	Barbara Aukerman	
2014	Benched	Annie	
2014–2016	Go-Go Boy Interrupted	Mom	
2016, 2019	Mike Tyson Mysteries	Various voices	2 episodes
2018	Nobodies	Mary Ellen	
2019	The Cool Kids	Judy	
2020	AJ and the Queen	Florence	
