= Ron Palillo =

American actor and teacher (1949–2012)

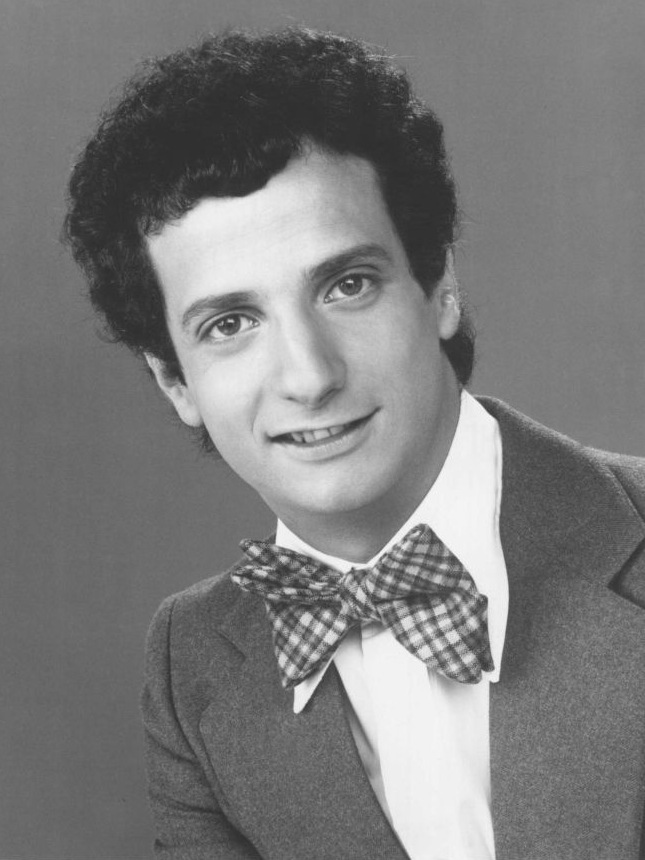
- Palillo in 1975
- Born: Ronald Gabriel Paolillo; April 2, 1949; New Haven, Connecticut, U.S.
- Died: August 14, 2012 (aged 63); Palm Beach Gardens, Florida, U.S.
- Resting place: St. Lawrence Cemetery
- Other name: Ronald G. Paolillo (as illustrator)
- Education: University of Connecticut
- Occupations: Actor; illustrator; playwright
- Years active: 1975–2012
- Partner: Joseph Gramm (1971–2012; Palillo's death)

Ronald Gabriel Palillo (April 2, 1949 – August 14, 2012) was an American actor and teacher. He was best known for his role as the endearingly dim-witted character Arnold Horshack on the ABC sitcom Welcome Back, Kotter (1975–1979).

== Early life and education ==
Ronald Gabriel Paolillo was born in New Haven, Connecticut, to Italian-Americans Gabriel and Carmel Paolillo, and raised in nearby Cheshire. His father died of lung cancer when he was 10 years old. He graduated from Cheshire High School and the University of Connecticut at Storrs, where he would teach in the 1990s. He attended Fairfield University while pursuing a postgraduate degree. He adopted the last name "Palillo" for his acting career.

== Career ==
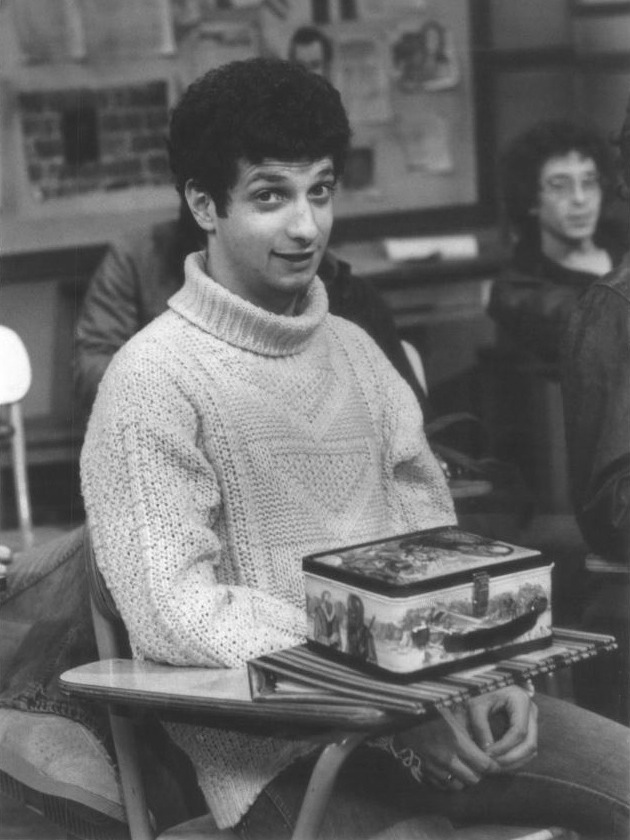
Palillo as "Sweathog" Arnold Horshack on Welcome Back, Kotter, c. 1976

In 1975, Palillo was cast as Arnold Horshack, one of the misfit "sweathogs" in the high school sitcom Welcome Back, Kotter, whose antics made him one of the standout characters of the series. In the last season of the series, a backdoor pilot episode for a spin-off series featuring Horshack was produced, but the series was not developed.

Following Kotter, Palillo appeared in leading and supporting roles in various television series and films. He voiced characters on such animated series as Laverne & Shirley in the Army, Darkwing Duck, and Rubik, the Amazing Cube, in which he played the lead character. In 1996, Palillo played himself in several episodes of the television sitcom Ellen, playing the love interest of Ellen's friend Audrey. Palillo also spent a year on the daytime show One Life to Live and also acted in Friday the 13th Part VI: Jason Lives (1986), and the lead in The Curse of Micah Rood.

He returned to New York City in 1991, and played such stage roles as Mozart in Amadeus and regionally as George in Who's Afraid of Virginia Woolf?, Arthur in Camelot, and Nathan Detroit in Guys and Dolls. He appeared on Broadway in 2008 in Broadway Backwards 4, a charity event benefiting Broadway Cares/Equity Fights AIDS and the Lesbian, Gay, Bisexual and Transgender Community Center. Among his other New York City credits was a one-person show in 2000 where he portrayed Nazi criminal Adolf Eichmann in The Diary of Adolf Eichmann off-Broadway. Palillo, in a newspaper interview in 1997, said he lamented his role as Horshack, as he was permanently typecast, which he believed had damaged his career. The following year, Palillo starred in The Fourposter at the Wayside Theatre in Middletown, Virginia.

As a director, Palillo led successful productions of the musical Three Guys Naked from the Waist Down in Los Angeles, A Closer Walk with Patsy Cline, and a new edition of Phantom of the Opera at the Cuillo Center for the Arts in West Palm Beach, Florida. In 2007, he introduced a clothing line specializing in limited-edition T-shirts produced by Rotter and Friends. Palillo was also an artist, providing artwork for two children's books: The Red Wings of Christmas and A Gift for the Contessa.

In 2006, his first full-length play, The Lost Boy, the true story of Peter Pan author J. M. Barrie, premiered at the Helen Hayes Theatre in Nyack, New York, and later played at the Queens Theatre in the Park in Queens, New York, and at El Dorado Springs High School in El Dorado Springs, Missouri.

He taught freshman drama at G-Star School of the Arts for Motion Pictures and Broadcasting in Palm Springs, Florida.

== Personal life and death ==
Palillo and his partner of 41 years, Joseph Gramm, lived in Palm Beach Gardens, Florida. On August 14, 2012, Palillo suffered a heart attack at his home and was taken by ambulance to a nearby hospital, where he was pronounced dead on arrival. He died seven months after co-star Robert Hegyes, who also died from a heart attack.

Palillo's funeral service was held in Palm Beach Gardens on August 22, 2012. He is buried at St. Lawrence Cemetery in West Haven, Connecticut. A memorial tribute, directed by Lawrence Leritz and hosted by Tyne Daly, was held to honor and celebrate Palillo's life and career at New York City's Triad Theatre on October 3, 2012.

== Filmography ==
Film and television
Year	Title	Role	Notes
1975–1979	Welcome Back, Kotter	Arnold Horshack	94 episodes
1976	Mr. T and Tina	Arnold Horshack	Episode: "Pilot"
1979	The Love Boat	Al Breyer	Episode: "Gopher's Opportunity / The Switch / Home Sweet Home" S2 E15
1979	$weepstake$	Harold	Episode: "Dewey and Harold and Sarah and Maggie"
1979	Greatest Heroes of the Bible	Hevet	Episode: "The Tower of Babel"
1979	Skatetown, U.S.A.	Frankey	Feature film
1981	The Love Boat	Casper Martin	Episode: "Lose One, Win One / The $10,000 Lover/Mind My Wife"
1981–1982	Laverne & Shirley in the Army	Sergeant Squealy	Voice, 13 episodes
1981	Alice	Mutner	Episode: "The Wild One"
1982	Mork & Mindy/Laverne & Shirley/Fonz Hour	Sergeant Squealy	Voice, 8 episodes (Laverne & Shirley with the Fonz segment)
1983	Rubik, the Amazing Cube	Rubik	Voice, 13 episodes
1983	The A-Team	Zack	Episode: "Mexican Slayride"
1983	CHiPs	Nick	Episode: "Journey to a Spacecraft"
1983	The Invisible Woman	"Spike" Mitchell	TV film
1983	Matt Houston	Charley Arbis	Episode: "The Beverly Woods Social Club"
1984	Surf II	Inspector "Underwear"	Feature film
1984	Murder, She Wrote	Norman Lester, Esq.	Episode: "Hooray for Homicide"
1985	Doin' Time	Pappion	Feature film
1985	Pound Puppies	Scrounger	Voice, TV special
1986	Friday the 13th Part VI: Jason Lives	Allen Hawes	Feature film
1986	Trapper John, M.D.	Kussman	Episode: "Elusive Butterfly"
1986	Cagney & Lacey	Mr. Larkin	Episode: "Rites of Passage"
1987–1988	Little Clowns of Happytown	Whiner	Voice, 18 episodes
1988	Superman	Additional Voices	Episode: "Night of the Living Shadows / Graduation"
1989	Snake Eater	"Torchy"	Feature film
1989	Hellgate	Matt	Feature film
1989	Snake Eater II: The Drug Buster	"Torchy"	Feature film
1990	The Adventures of Don Coyote and Sancho Panda	Additional Voices	Episode: "Pity the Poor Pirate"
1990	Midnight Patrol: Adventures in the Dream Zone	Additional Voices	13 episodes; aka Potsworth & Co.
1991	Committed	Ronnie	Feature film
1991	Darkwing Duck	Ordinary Guy	Voice, Episode: "Planet of the Capes"
1992	Wind	Tony	Feature film
1992	Phil Donahue Show	Himself	Famous Past Celebrities
1994	One Life to Live	Gary Warren	Daytime drama
1996	Ellen	Himself	Sitcom, 3 episodes
1997	Mr. Rhodes	Arnold Horshack	Episode: "The Welcome Back Show"
1997	Duckman	Himself	Episode: "Westward, No!"
2003	Dickie Roberts: Former Child Star	Himself	Cameo, Feature film
2003	Style Court	Juror	Episode #2.26
2004	Trees 2: The Root of All Evil	Dougie Styles	Feature film
2008	The Curse of Micah Rood	Micah Rood	Short film
2010	The Guardians	Professor Walker	Feature film
2010	It's a Dog Gone Tale: Destiny's Stand	Randolph Baines	Feature film (final film role)
