= The Fonz and the Happy Days Gang =

1980 American animated television series

- Genre: Science fiction Comedy; Adventure
- Based on: Happy Days by Garry Marshall
- Developed by: Duane Poole; Tom Swale
- Directed by: George Gordon; Ray Patterson; Chris Cuddington; Carl Urbano; Rudy Zamora
- Voices of: Henry Winkler; Ron Howard; Donny Most; Didi Conn; Frank Welker
- Narrated by: Wolfman Jack
- Composer: Hoyt Curtin
- Country of origin: United States
- Original language: English
- No. of seasons: 2
- No. of episodes: 24

Production
- Executive producers: William Hanna; Joseph Barbera
- Producers: Art Scott (season 1); Don Jurwich (season 2); Duane Poole; Tom Swale
- Running time: 25 minutes
- Production companies: Hanna-Barbera Productions; Paramount Television

Original release
- Network: ABC
- Release: November 8, 1980 – November 28, 1981

Related
- Laverne & Shirley in the Army; Happy Days

The Fonz and the Happy Days Gang is an American animated science fiction comedy series produced by Hanna-Barbera Productions and Paramount Television and originally broadcast during the Saturday morning schedule on ABC from November 8, 1980, until November 28, 1981. It is a spin-off of the live-action sitcom Happy Days.

== Premise ==
Henry Winkler (The Fonz/ "Fonzie"), Ron Howard (Richie Cunningham), and Donny Most (Ralph Malph) all reprised their respective roles for The Fonz and the Happy Days Gang.

The series's "present day" is 1957. Each episode begins with an expository narration that Fonzie and his friends (including a new anthropomorphic dog named Mr. Cool) are visited by Cupcake, a girl from the future who pilots a malfunctioning time machine. After Fonzie repairs the machine to get her back to the 25th century, a subsequent accident causes the group to become missing in time.

The series focuses on Fonzie and his friends as they land in various periods in time, attempting to return to 1957 Milwaukee. Twenty-four episodes were produced.

== Cast ==
- Henry Winkler as Arthur "The Fonz" Fonzarelli
- Ron Howard as Richie Cunningham
- Donny Most as Ralph Malph
- Frank Welker as Mr. Cool, a dog
- Didi Conn as Cupcake, a space pilot from the 25th century whose clumsy superpowers usually make things worse by accident
- Wolfman Jack as opening narrator

Anson Williams, who played Potsie Webber in the live action Happy Days, did not appear in the cartoon series.

== Home media ==
On November 5, 2019, the complete series was released as a made-on-demand DVD-R by CBS Home Entertainment.

== Episodes ==
Season	Episodes	Originally released	
Season	Episodes	First released	Last released
1	13	November 8, 1980	January 31, 1981
2	11	September 12, 1981	November 28, 1981

=== Season 1 (1980–81) ===
No. overall	No. in season	Title	Original release date
1	1	"King for a Day"	November 8, 1980
In the first episode, in which the time machine winds up in the year 1,000,000 BC, a tribe of cave people select Ralph as their king for a day. But the gang wonders why the previous kings had such a short reign. The answer when revealed may lead to Ralph's doom, unless Fonzie and the gang step in to help him.
2	2	"May the Farce Be with You"	November 15, 1980
The time machine is close to getting to the year 1957, but it overshoots by a century, causing it to wind up in the year 2057. Worse yet, Cupcake's magic caused it to go into space. The gang manages to get it to the Moon, where they learn of an alien plot to destroy Earth. Can the Fonz stop their invasion plans?
3	3	"Arabian Knights"	November 22, 1980
The time machine transports the gang to ancient Persia (now known as Iran), where they help a princess overthrow her uncle, who is aided by an evil genie, and is looking for her hidden treasure.
4	4	"Bye Bye Blackbeard"	November 29, 1980
The time machine takes the gang to the Age of Pirates, where Edward Teach, a.k.a. Blackbeard, needs the gang's help to find a lost treasure.
5	5	"Westward Whoa!"	December 6, 1980
The time machine teleports the gang to the American Old West in the 19th century, where they help capture the famous outlaw Big Jake, who happens to be a dead ringer for Fonzie.
6	6	"Ming Fu to You, Too!"	December 13, 1980
The gang's time machine takes them to the Ming Dynasty of China in 1371, where the Hongwu Emperor learns of Cupcake's time machine and hypnotizes the Fonz to help him steal it.
7	7	"The Vampire Strikes Back"	December 20, 1980
Unknowingly aided by Count Wolfgang Von Wolfenstein, the gang's time machine winds up back to their present time of 1957, but not in Milwaukee. They end up in Transylvania, where they meet the count at his castle and have to overcome various horrors in order to escape -- one of which has a scared Ralph turning into a savage werewolf.
8	8	"You'll Never Get Witch"	December 27, 1980
While the gang is experiencing life in Massachusetts during the Salem Witch Trials in 1693, Cupcake is captured by a crazed witch hunter and now the gang must save her on their own.
9	9	"The 20,000 Drachma Pyramid"	January 3, 1981
Cupcake takes the gang to ancient Egypt, right before Cleopatra's coronation, which is rivaled by the treacherous high priest, Ra.
10	10	"It's a Jungle Out There"	January 10, 1981
The Happy Days gang have made it back to 1957, but unfortunately land in Peru, where they stumble upon the lost city of gold in Peru, which belongs to the lost civilization of the Incas, who accuse the gang of stealing their golden idol.
11	11	"Gone with the Wand"	January 17, 1981
In medieval Camelot, the gang comes to the aid of King Arthur and Merlin the Magician when the evil Black Knight imprisons Arthur and plots to take over his kingdom.
12	12	"Science Friction"	January 24, 1981
In the year 3057, The Happy Days gang discover that humans are being captured by the Crolacs to work underground.
13	13	"Greece Is the Word"	January 31, 1981
The Happy Days gang land in ancient Greece, which is being seized by the Medusa-like Umbra.

=== Season 2 (1981) ===
No. overall	No. in season	Title	Written by	Original release date
14	1	"The French Correction"	Duane Poole & Tom Swale	September 12, 1981
The gang teams up with the Three Musketeers to save Queen Anne of Austria in 1625 France.
15	2	"Kelp!"	Diane Duane	September 19, 1981
Fonz and the gang end up in 3817 on the ocean floor in a battle between the kelp farmers of Aqua City and a greedy surface-dweller who wants to destroy the city to get at the gold below.
16	3	"Time Schlep"	Duane Poole & Tom Swale	September 26, 1981
On their way to Milwaukee 1957, the gang gets stuck in a time storm in the Bermuda Triangle where they meet Ula and her giant ape, Mongo. They are pursued by villains on a hover transport.
17	4	"It's All Downhill from Here"	Paul Haggis & Michael Maurer	October 10, 1981
The gang finds themselves in 1864 Greenland and traveling to Jules Verne's Center of the Earth to help Anna find her father.
18	5	"Double Jeopardy"	Joan Brooker & Alexandra Stoddart	October 17, 1981
The evil stepmother of the Princess of Siam is plotting against the Princess and only Fonzie and the gang can save her.
19	6	"Fjords and Sorcery"	Diane Duane	October 24, 1981
Viking Sorceress Grimhilde strands the gang, so they must find the second magical bracelet to right the situation.
20	7	"There's No Place Like Rome"	Jeffrey Scott	October 31, 1981
In ancient Rome the gang must save Claudia from Julius Maximus.
21	8	"Perilous Pauline"	Duane Poole & Tom Swale	November 7, 1981
Grimsley Gladewater has foreclosed on Pauline's home and impounded the time machine, so the Fonz must rescue Pauline over and over.
22	9	"Around the World in 80 Ways"	Duane Poole & Tom Swale	November 14, 1981
Losing the shrunken time machine in a trophy cup, the gang must enter Jules Verne's race around the world.
23	10	"All This and Timbuktu"	Diane Duane	November 21, 1981
Landing in Central Africa around 1100, the team meets a beautiful and capable jungle woman and joins her quest to find her kidnapped astronomer father.
24	11	"Give Me a Hand – Something's Afoot"	Duane Poole & Tom Swale	November 28, 1981
Fonz and the Gang meet Sherlock Holmes in 1899 London. They must foil Professor Moriarty's plot to steal the Crown Jewels to use in a more nefarious scheme. Note: This episode would mark Ron Howard's final regular appearance in the Happy Days franchise as Richie Cunningham (albeit in animated form).

== Legacy ==
After the series ended, the characters of Fonzie and Mr. Cool were introduced in the series Laverne & Shirley in the Army, which premiered October 10, 1981. The series was subsequently renamed Laverne & Shirley with Special Guest Star The Fonz and depicted Fonzie working in the motorpool as the chief mechanic. That series ran until September 3, 1983. Both series were syndicated with an animated spin-off of the series Mork & Mindy as Mork & Mindy/Laverne & Shirley/Fonz Hour.

== See also ==
- List of animated spin-offs from prime time shows
