= Gilligan's Planet =

- Title card
- Created by: Sherwood Schwartz
- Directed by: Hal Sutherland
- Voices of: Bob Denver; Alan Hale Jr. Russell Johnson; Jim Backus; Natalie Schafer; Dawn Wells; Lou Scheimer
- Country of origin: United States
- No. of seasons: 1
- No. of episodes: 13

Production
- Executive producer: Lou Scheimer
- Cinematography: R.W. Pope
- Editors: Joe Gall; George Mahana
- Running time: 22 minutes
- Production companies: Filmation; MGM/UA Television

Original release
- Network: CBS
- Release: September 18 – December 11, 1982

Gilligan's Planet is an American Saturday morning animated series produced by Filmation and MGM/UA Television which aired during the 1982–1983 season on CBS. It was the second animated spin-off of the sitcom Gilligan's Island (the first being The New Adventures of Gilligan).

Gilligan's Planet was the last cartoon series that Filmation produced for Saturday mornings; afterwards, they transitioned from Saturday mornings to producing cartoons exclusively for syndication. It was also the first Filmation series to feature the Lou Scheimer "signature" credit (as opposed to the rotating Lou Scheimer/Norm Prescott "wheel" credit which had been used since 1969). In addition, it was one of the last 1980s Saturday morning cartoons to be fitted with an adult laugh track, as the popularity of the practice had subsided.

Gilligan's Planet featured all of the original actors but one; Tina Louise, who has consistently refused to participate in any Gilligan's Island-related material since the series ended, again declined to reprise her role as Ginger Grant, who again was portrayed as a platinum blonde (as was the case in The New Adventures) instead of Louise's red hair. Dawn Wells, who had been unavailable during the production of The New Adventures of Gilligan, returned to the franchise, voicing both her own character (Mary Ann Summers) and Ginger. Gilligan's Planet would also be the final time that Backus and Hale would portray their respective characters, Mr. Howell and the Skipper, before their deaths in 1989 and 1990 respectively.

== Premise ==
Gilligan's Planet is a spin-off of The New Adventures of Gilligan, based on the premise that the Professor had managed to build an operational interplanetary spaceship to get the castaways of the original series off the island. True to the castaways' perpetual bad luck, they rocketed off into space and crash-landed on an unknown planet that supported human life. In many ways, the planet was like the island, but with a strangely colored and cratered surface with more land to get around. The rocket was severely damaged in the crash; thus, the castaways were still stranded and the Professor resumed his attempts to repair their only way home.

Overall, Gilligan's Planet re-presented the source material of the original live-action series with space and alien themes. Encounters with headhunters and other shipwrecked people instead became encounters with alien creatures. A new character named Bumper was added, who appeared as a reptilian alien pet/sidekick for Gilligan and company.

== Production notes ==
The theme song from The New Adventures of Gilligan was recycled, with new narration to explain the new show's premise. Sherwood Schwartz, who had hands-on involvement in the New Adventures series, was not as heavily involved in Gilligan's Planet. Two of the show's primary writers, Tom Ruegger and Paul Dini, would emerge at Warner Bros. Animation in the 1990s.

This is one of the few Filmation series not currently owned by successor Universal Television/Classic Media. It is instead owned by Warner Bros. Television Studios through Turner Entertainment Co. as it is a part of the pre-May 1986 Metro-Goldwyn-Mayer library.

== Cast ==
- Bob Denver as Gilligan
- Alan Hale Jr. as Skipper Jonas Grumby
- Jim Backus as Thurston Howell III
- Natalie Schafer as "Lovey" Wentworth Howell
- Russell Johnson as Professor Roy Hinkley
- Dawn Wells as Mary Ann Summers, Ginger Grant
- Lou Scheimer as Bumper

== Episodes ==
No.	Title	Directed by	Written by	Original release date
1	"I Dream of Genie"	Hal Sutherland	Marc Richards	September 18, 1982
Gilligan rescues a robot named Wizzard from a landslide, which then grants Gilligan's every wish out of gratitude. Eventually, Mr. Howell becomes the robot's master, and misuses his wishes, ruining another chance to get home.
2	"Turnabout Is Fair Play"	Hal Sutherland	Marc Richards	September 25, 1982
The Skipper has been shirking his duties at the compound, and insists that his time is better spent guarding everyone from alien invaders, though in reality, he is simply napping. When real aliens invade, he is quickly captured, and must be rescued by his "helpless" friends.
3	"Let Sleeping Minnows Lie"	Hal Sutherland	Paul Dini	October 2, 1982
The Skipper becomes despondent due to having been away from the sea and his boat for so long, so the others decide to build him a small boat, which serves the dual purpose of allowing the Professor to reach a small island which he thinks might be a source of mica, needed to repair their rocket. An attack by a sea monster leaves them stranded on the island, but not all is as it appears...
4	"Journey to the Center of Gilligan's Planet"	Hal Sutherland	Tom Ruegger	October 9, 1982
Gilligan continually attempts to avoid his chores to read his comic book, causing a series of mishaps and accidents, culminating in the castaways falling into a hole that leads to the center of the planet, where they are taken prisoner.
5	"Amazing Colossal Gilligan"	Hal Sutherland	Marc Richards	October 16, 1982
While collecting samples from the Million Lakes region of the planet for the Professor, Gilligan accidentally falls into a lake full of yellow liquid and becomes a giant. Space circus owner P.C. Barnaby arrives on the planet in his ship, and tries to steal Gilligan and turn him into his latest attraction.
6	"Bumper to Bumper"	Hal Sutherland	Robby London	October 23, 1982
Bumper continually gets scolded in his attempts to find someone to play with. He decides to run away, and gets abducted by visiting aliens who worship his species.
7	"Road to Boom"	Hal Sutherland	Marc Richards	October 30, 1982
The Professor discovers that the planet on which they are marooned will soon be pulled into a "space hole", so the castaways try everything they can to avert this disaster, including mounting the rocket pod from their ship on a tower to try to change the planet's course.
8	"Too Many Gilligans"	Hal Sutherland	Robby London	November 6, 1982
Gilligan and Skipper find a cloning device that Gilligan accidentally walks through twice, and Mr. Howell and Ginger go through once, creating multiple copies of themselves with disastrous results. Eventually Bumper coaxes them all to run through the device multiple times until it short circuits and explodes, causing all the clones to vanish.
9	"Space Pirates"	Hal Sutherland	Marc Richards & Tom Ruegger	November 13, 1982
Gilligan discovers a treasure trove of advanced technical equipment, including a "size transformer cube", and accidentally shrinks all the castaways except the Professor. Soon after, pirates arrive looking for the cube and the other equipment, and chaos ensues...
10	"Invaders of the Lost Barque"	Hal Sutherland	Tom Ruegger	November 20, 1982
While trying to retrieve a wrench that fell down a hole near their rocket, Gilligan discovers a map leading to a spaceship called The Lost Barque. The castaways head to a nearby cave to search for it, unaware that a group of tiny aliens who call themselves Quarks are trying to stop them so they can find the ship first.
11	"Wings"	Hal Sutherland	Marc Richards	November 27, 1982
Gilligan accidentally turns on the Professor's radio and attracts a pilotless space probe. One of the castaways might be able to pilot it back to earth, but the castaways all want the fame and fortune, so the Professor puts Bumper in charge of training them to see who is best suited.
12	"Super Gilligan"	Hal Sutherland	Marc Richards & Tom Ruegger	December 4, 1982
A cosmic hurricane damages the compound, and the rocket's steering mechanism is blown away. While searching for it, Gilligan stumbles into a cave where an old man mistakes him for a great hero, and gives him a cape which grants superpowers, so he can defeat a villain named Gooniack.
13	"Gilligan's Army"	Hal Sutherland	Marc Richards	December 11, 1982
An alien drill sergeant (who resembles Darth Vader) and his commanding officer (who resembles Groucho Marx) land on the planet, and mistake the castaways for a group of recruits that they have been sent to train for intergalactic space missions.

== Home media ==
On July 22, 2014, Warner Archive released Gilligan's Planet: The Complete Series on DVD in region 1 as part of their Warner Archive Collection. This was a manufacture-on-demand release, available exclusively through Warner's online store and Amazon.com. The DVD set has since been made available via Amazon.

== See also ==
- List of animated spin-offs from prime time shows
