= 1982–83 United States network television schedule (late night) =

These are the late night schedules on all three television networks in the United States for each calendar season beginning September 1982. All times are Eastern/Pacific.

PBS is not included, as member television stations have local flexibility over most of their schedules and broadcast times for network shows may vary. CBS and ABC are not included on the weekend schedules as the networks do not offer late night programs of any kind on weekends.

Talk/variety shows are highlighted in yellow, network news programs in gold, and local news & programs are highlighted in white background.

== Monday-Friday ==
-		11:00 PM	11:30 PM	12:00 AM	12:30 AM	1:00 AM	1:30 AM	2:00 AM	2:30 AM	3:00 AM	3:30 AM	4:00 AM	4:30 AM	5:00 AM	5:30 AM
ABC	Fall	Local programming	ABC News Nightline	The Last Word			Local programming
ABC	April	Local programming	ABC News Nightline	One on One			Local programming
CBS		Local programming	The CBS Late Movie				Local programming	CBS News Nightwatch
NBC	Fall	Local programming	The Tonight Show Starring Johnny Carson		Late Night with David Letterman (Mon.-Thur.)/SCTV Network 90 to 2:00 (Fri)		NBC News Overnight (Mon.-Thur.,1:30-2:30/Fri.,2:00-3:00)		Local programming
NBC	Summer	Local programming	The Tonight Show Starring Johnny Carson		Late Night with David Letterman (Mon.-Thur.)/Friday Night Videos to 2:00 (Fri)		NBC News Overnight (Mon.-Thur.,1:30-2:30/Fri.,2:00-3:00)		Local programming

== Saturday ==
-	11:00 PM	11:30 PM	12:00 AM	12:30 AM	1:00 AM	1:30 AM	2:00 AM	2:30 AM	3:00 AM	3:30 AM	4:00 AM	4:30 AM	5:00 AM	5:30 AM
NBC	Local programming	Saturday Night Live			Local programming

== Sunday ==
-	11:00 PM	11:30 PM	12:00 AM	12:30 AM	1:00 AM	1:30 AM	2:00 AM	2:30 AM	3:00 AM	3:30 AM	4:00 AM	4:30 AM	5:00 AM	5:30 AM
NBC	Local programming	NBC Late Night Movie				Local programming

== By network ==
=== ABC ===
Returning series

- Nightline

New series

- One on One
- The Last Word

Not returning from 1981–82

- ABC Late Night
- Fridays

=== CBS ===
Returning series

- The CBS Late Movie

New series

- CBS News Nightwatch

=== NBC ===
Returning series

- Late Night with David Letterman
- NBC Late Night Movie
- NBC News Overnight
- Saturday Night Live
- SCTV Network 90
- The Tonight Show Starring Johnny Carson

New series

- Friday Night Videos

Not returning from 1981–82

- Tomorrow Coast to Coast
