= List of Mork & Mindy episodes =

The following is an episode list for the ABC sitcom television series Mork & Mindy. The series ran from September 14, 1978, to May 27, 1982, with a total of 91 episodes (split into 95 for syndication).

== Series overview ==
Season	Episodes	Originally released		Rank	Rating
Season	Episodes	First released	Last released	Rank	Rating
1	25	September 14, 1978	May 10, 1979	3	28.6 (Tied with Happy Days)
2	26	September 16, 1979	May 1, 1980	27	20.2
3	22	November 13, 1980	May 14, 1981	49	—N/a
4	22	October 8, 1981	May 27, 1982	60	—N/a

== Episodes ==
=== Season 1 (1978–79) ===
No. overall	No. in season	Title	Directed by	Written by	Original release date
1	1	"Pilot"	Howard Storm	Dale McRaven	September 14, 1978
2	2	"Pilot"	Howard Storm	Dale McRaven	September 14, 1978
Mork's boss, Orson, assigns the misfit Mork to study the planet Earth. After landing in the woods near Boulder, Colorado, he meets Mindy McConnell, who was stranded there by a man who had attempted to get too fresh with her before stealing her car. Because Mork wears his clothes backward, Mindy believes that he is a priest. Mork and Mindy walk back to town and go to Mindy's apartment, where she discovers that Mork is an alien, and offers to help him study Earth. In a flashback sequence, Mork tells Mindy about a previous visit to Earth, when Arthur Fonzarelli arranged a date for him with Laverne De Fazio. When Mindy's father, Fred, discovers that Mork has moved in with Mindy, Deputy Tilwick offers to scare off Mork. Tilwick believes that Mork is insane, and tries to have him committed. Note: one-hour episode Special Guest Stars: Henry Winkler as Arthur "Fonzie" Fonzarelli, Penny Marshall as Laverne De Fazio.
3	3	"Mork Moves In"	Howard Storm	Lloyd Turner & Gordon Mitchell	September 21, 1978
Orson contacts Mork, stating that the elders have lost Mork's last report, causing Mork to replay his report to Orson. After constant hounding from Fred, Mork agrees to move out of Mindy's apartment. But Mork's plans are complicated when he becomes drunk ("bezurb") on ginger ale. Note: Mork reveals that he is an alien to Mindy's father, but Fred initially does not believe him.
4	4	"Mork Runs Away"	Joel Zwick	April Kelly	September 28, 1978
After unintentionally ruining Mindy's date, Mork realizes the havoc that he is wreaking on her romantic life, and decides to move out. While looking for a flop house, he stumbles on Exidor, the delusional leader (and only tangible member) of "The Friends of Venus". Special Guest Star: Robert Donner as Exidor
5	5	"Mork in Love"	Harvey Medlinsky	Lloyd Turner & Gordon Mitchell	October 5, 1978
When Mindy tells Mork that he has to experience love to understand the human experience, he takes her advice and falls head-over-heels for the lovely Dolly, oblivious to the fact that she is a mannequin. Note: Mork and Mindy kiss for the first time.
6	6	"Mork's Seduction"	Harvey Medlinsky	Neil Lebowitz	October 12, 1978
A new customer at the music store turns out to be Mindy's old rival, Susan Taylor (played by Morgan Fairchild). Susan sets her sights on Mork, as revenge for Mindy "stealing" her boyfriend back in high school. Note: Mork and Mindy kiss again in this episode.
7	7	"Mork Goes Public"	Joel Zwick	David Misch & April Kelly	October 19, 1978
At the music store, Mork has a run-in with Clint Mullet, a reporter for a tabloid that is offering $25,000 for proof of alien life. After Fred saves Mork's life, Mork decides to turn himself in to pay for Fred's plumbing bills and Mindy's college tuition. Guest Star: Jeff Altman as Clint Mullet
8	8	"To Tell the Truth"	Joel Zwick	April Kelly	November 2, 1978
When Mork tricks Mindy into believing that he can predict the weather, Mindy tells him that he should never lie ("splink"). The music store's despicable landlord, Arnold Wanker, dies while trying to evict Fred from the music store. Mork, hearing the family trying to comfort his widow, assumes that Wanker is their friend, and brings him back from the dead.
9	9	"Mork the Gullible"	Howard Storm	Neil Lebowitz	November 9, 1978
Mork learns something about gullibility when he is arrested for falling for a criminal's sob story and setting him free. Mork soon ends up with Exidor as a cellmate, where Exidor is worshiping O.J. Simpson.
10	10	"A Mommy for Morky"	Howard Storm	Tom Tenowich	November 16, 1978
When Mindy is reunited with her ex-fiancé, Dan (Barry Van Dyke), she wonders what it would be like to raise a family, while Mork wonders what it would have been like to have had a mother. Mork uses his Orkan Age Machine to regress to 3 years old.
11	11	"Mork's Greatest Hits"	Howard Storm	David Misch	November 23, 1978
After Mork rescues Mindy from the unwanted advances of a man named George (Brion James), the masher starts looking for the alien who he feels humiliated him. Although Mork has an aversion to violence, he must find a way to deal with George. Orkan Fact: On Ork, which has long been a pacifist planet, violence is not only outlawed but considered disgraceful; acts of violence are considered humiliating to those who practice them. In Orkan culture, the highest form of courage is to avoid a fight cleverly.
12	12	"Old Fears"	Howard Storm	April Kelly	November 30, 1978
When a long time friend of Cora's passes away, she goes into a funk. When Mork hears that she needs more friends her age, he decides to become one by using his Orkan Age Machine. Orkan Fact: Mork notes that, of all the planets he has visited, Earth is the only one whose inhabitants do not honor their elders. Note: Mork reveals his alien nature to Cora in this episode.
13	13	"Mork's First Christmas"	Jeff Chambers	Dale McRaven & Bruce Johnson	December 14, 1978
Mork learns the meaning of Christmas, and helps to remind everyone else about it when he invites Susan Taylor to spend Christmas with the McConnells because she has no one to celebrate with. Note: No report to Orson is made this episode; a different end sequence is shown.
14	14	"Mork and the Immigrant"	Howard Storm	David O'Malley & April Kelly	January 11, 1979
Mork thinks that Russian immigrant, Sergei Krushnev, is an alien like him, and tries to help welcome him. Trouble ensues when Sergei tells Mork that "aliens" need to be registered.
15	15	"Mork the Tolerant"	Howard Storm	Lloyd Turner & Gordon Mitchell	January 18, 1979
Mindy is irritated by her grouchy new neighbor, Franklin Bickley, but Mork is determined to be friends with him. Guest Star: Tom Poston as Franklin Bickley
16	16	"Young Love"	Howard Storm	Tom Tenowich	January 25, 1979
Mork performs a wedding ceremony to marry his juvenile friend, Eugene, and his girlfriend, Holly, thinking that this will enable them to escape "parental oppression".
17	17	"Skyflakes Keep Falling on My Head"	Howard Storm	Dale McRaven & Bruce Johnson	February 1, 1979
Exidor returns with a plan to become "Emperor of Earth". In return for Mork's help, Exidor lets him use his summer home so Mindy can get some rest and relaxation, but the vacation does not go as planned.
18	18	"Mork Goes Erk"	Howard Storm	Lloyd Turner & Gordon Mitchell	February 8, 1979
After Mork receives the depressing news that he may be transferred to another planet, Susan Taylor convinces him, Mindy and Mr. Bickley to attend a seminar of ERK (short for Ellsworth Revitalization Konditioning), but the tyrannical Ellsworth is exposed as a hypocrite. Guest Stars: David Letterman as Ellsworth, Tom Poston as Franklin Bickley
19	19	"Yes Sir, That's My Baby"	Jeff Chambers	April Kelly	February 15, 1979
Sally returns with her newborn son, and Mork loves him so much that he wants a baby of his own. He buys a baby for $10,000 from a shady character named Chuck Wilson, unaware that Wilson is wanted by the FBI for various baby abductions.
20	20	"Mork's Mixed Emotions"	Jeff Chambers	Tom Tenowich & Ed Scharlach	February 22, 1979
Mork, disturbed after having a nightmare, shuts off his emotions. When Mindy kisses him, his emotions are released, but now the Orkan cannot control them, resulting in embarrassing shifts from moment to moment. Note: In 1997, this episode was ranked #94 on TV Guide's list of the 100 Greatest Episodes of All Time.
21	21	"Mork's Night Out"	Howard Storm	Dale McRaven & Bruce Johnson	March 8, 1979
When Mindy goes away for the weekend, Mork and Mr. Bickley go to a singles bar for a night out. The women who they meet and bring back to Mr. Bickley's place are thieves and steal his things. Guest Stars: Tom Poston as Franklin Bickley, Ruta Lee as Lisa, Robin Eisenman as Penny
22	22	"In Mork We Trust"	Howard Storm	Michael Endler	March 15, 1979
When Mr. Bickley steals Mork's Orkan Age Machine, he unknowingly causes Mork's age to change from that of a baby to middle age. Guest Star: Tom Poston as Franklin Bickley Orkan Fact: Orkans evolved from chickens.
23	23	"Mork Runs Down"	Howard Storm	Ben Starr	April 12, 1979
Mork's attempt to find a new job is complicated by his "birthday", a potentially fatal condition that causes him to behave stranger than usual unless he recharges himself with his egg-like "gleek". Guest Star: Susan Elliot as Rainbow, Henry Polic II as Doctor Ducky
24	24	"It's a Wonderful Mork"	Howard Storm	Ed Scharlach & Tom Tenowich	May 3, 1979
When Mork inadvertently costs a potential job for Mindy, he wishes that he had never come to Earth, and he informs Orson of this. Orson shows Mork what would have happened to Mindy over the last year had he not been there. Mork sees that Mindy is married to Cliff, who has a gambling problem, Fred has traveled the world and had a short relationship with a woman, Cora lives with Mindy, and the McConnells' music store has been sold. Guest Stars: Linda Henning as Margaret, Sam Freed as Cliff Note: The title is an homage to It's a Wonderful Life.
25	25	"Mork's Best Friend"	Howard Storm	Simon Muntner	May 10, 1979
Mork has a pet caterpillar, which he has named Bob. Exidor shows up, claiming to have found "the true religion", which is reincarnation, and he claims to be the reincarnation of Julius Caesar. Mork soon becomes depressed when Bob becomes still and apparently lifeless. Special Guest Star: Robert Donner as Exidor

=== Season 2 (1979–80) ===
No. overall	No. in season	Title	Directed by	Written by	Original release date
26	1	"Mork in Wonderland"	Howard Storm	Dale McRaven & Bruce Johnson	September 16, 1979
27	2	"Mork in Wonderland"	Howard Storm	Dale McRaven & Bruce Johnson	September 16, 1979
Mork takes a cold capsule that works by shrinking an earthling's nasal membranes. It turns out, though, that Orkans are made entirely of membrane, so Mindy helplessly watches Mork shrink to nothing. While shrunk, Mork finds himself in an "alternate universe" called Mirth, where humor has been outlawed. Self-referentially based on Alice's Adventures in Wonderland/Through the Looking-Glass. Note: One-hour episode; Tom Poston's first episode as a regular. Filming for the shrinking effect in Part 1 was provided by Magicam.
28	3	"Stark Raving Mork"	Howard Storm	April Kelly	September 23, 1979
Hearing about "kissing and making up" from Mr. Bickley and Remo, Mork starts an argument with Mindy and gets thrown out of the house. Mork turns to Remo for help. Note: Debut episode of new regulars Jay Thomas and Gina Hecht as Remo DaVinci and his sister Jeannie DaVinci
29	4	"Mork's Baby Blues"	Howard Storm	David Misch & April Kelly	September 30, 1979
Due to a misunderstanding about Monopoly money, gold-digger Kathy Cumberland believes that Mork is rich, and claims that she is carrying his child. Guest Star: Dinah Manoff as Kathy Cumberland
30	5	"Dr. Morkenstein"	Harvey Medlinsky	Bruce Kalish & Philip John Taylor	October 7, 1979
Working as a security guard in a science museum where a Science Exhibition is being held, Mork befriends an old robot named Chuck who is headed for the junk pile. Special Guest Star: Roddy McDowall as the voice of Chuck the Robot
31	6	"Mork vs. Mindy"	Howard Storm	David Misch	October 14, 1979
After Mork and Mindy are hired as campaign workers by Mindy's cousin, Nelson Flavor (who is running for city councilman), they end up competing against each other for the same job.
32	7	"Mork Gets Mindy-itis"	Howard Storm	Tom Tenowich	October 21, 1979
Mork discovers that he is allergic to Mindy when he has uncontrollable fits of laughter (the Orkan equivalent to sneezing) when around her. Mork gets advice from Jeanie on what to do to cure his allergy. While Mindy helps with Nelson's election, Exidor returns and tells Mork that he has moved into a new apartment with his invisible girlfriend.
33	8	"A Morkville Horror"	Howard Storm	Tom Tenowich & Ed Scharlach	October 28, 1979
On Halloween, Mork and Mindy believe that the house in which she grew up and is selling to Mr. Bickley is haunted by ghosts. After an encounter with Exidor (who mistook Mindy's old house for a private getaway), Mork and Mindy encounter the ghosts of the house's builders, Dirdre and Lucinda LaFitte.
34	9	"Mork's Healthful Hints"	Howard Storm	David Misch	November 4, 1979
Mindy goes to the hospital for a tonsillectomy. However, due to a typographical error, Mindy is mistaken for another patient and nearly gets brain surgery instead. Fortunately, her knight in shining suspenders is up to the job.
35	10	"Dial "N" for Nelson"	Howard Storm	David Misch & April Kelly	November 11, 1979
When Nelson receives threatening phone calls, Mork and Mindy investigate a shady club.
36	11	"Mork vs. the Necrotons"	Howard Storm	Alan Eisenstock & Larry Mintz	November 18, 1979
37	12	"Mork vs. the Necrotons"	Howard Storm	Alan Eisenstock & Larry Mintz	November 18, 1979
Mork is captured by a female Necroton warrior named Captain Nirvana and her minions Kama and Sutra. She uses feminine charms to get information from Mork's mind about Earth. Kama and Sutra capture Mindy to lure Mork to Captain Nirvana. Mork and Mindy are soon trapped by the Necrotons, but Mork uses his slapstick to defeat his enemy. Note: one-hour episode Special Guest Star: Raquel Welch as Captain Nirvana Orkan Fact #1: Orkans and Necrotons have been enemies for millennia, yet prior to this episode, Orkans have no idea what Necrotons look like, paralleling a similar situation in the Star Trek season one episode, Balance of Terror, in which the U.S.S. Enterprise crew has no idea what Romulans look like before encountering them in said episode. Orkan Fact #2: On learning that Necrotons are coming to Earth, Orson straightforwardly advises Mork to hide. This is consistent with the fact that Orkans consider it humiliating to engage in battle, and honorable to avoid violence at any cost, as revealed in the season one episode, Mork's Greatest Hits.
38	13	"Hold That Mork"	Howard Storm	Bruce Kalish & Philip John Taylor	November 25, 1979
Mork becomes a member of "The Pony Express", the Denver Broncos Cheerleaders, making him pro-football's first male cheerleader. Nelson uses the idea of Mork being a cheerleader to further his campaign. Note: Portions were filmed at Mile High Stadium November 11, 1979, before a game between the Denver Broncos and the New England Patriots. Guest Star: Linda Henning as Pam Stockhaus
39	14	"The Exidor Affair"	Howard Storm	Dale McRaven & Bruce Johnson	December 2, 1979
Exidor wants to propose to a meter maid named Ambrosia Malspa, and asks Mork for help. When Exidor's invisible friend, Pepe, ruins the dinner date, Mork ends up taking in Exidor. While Mork tries to keep Exidor from leaving, Mindy tries to get Ambrosia to take Exidor back. Special Guest Star: Georgia Engel as Ambrosia Malspa
40	15	"The Mork Syndrome"	Howard Storm	April Kelly & David Patrick O'Malley	December 9, 1979
Mork mistakes the Air Force as a travel club, and joins up as Lt. Mork Fromork. Mork goes on a secret mission for the Air Force, and unintentionally blows the cover on irresponsible behavior regarding nuclear waste. Orkan Fact: Although Ork, like Earth, uses nuclear energy, the resultant "telltale nuclear waste" is easily disposed of via a spray called "Nuke-Away". Mork is incredulous that any planet would use nuclear energy without being able to dispose of such waste; the revelation that humans store nuclear waste in "cans" outright frightens him.
41	16	"Exidor's Wedding"	Howard Storm	Dale McRaven & Bruce Johnson	December 16, 1979
Exidor's long-lost mother, Princess Lusitania, shows up and tries to keep her son from getting married. Mork and Mindy must find a way to convince Princess Lusitania to let Exidor get married. Special Guest Star: Georgia Engel as Ambrosia Malspa
42	17	"A Mommy for Mindy"	Howard Storm	April Kelly	January 3, 1980
When Fred visits with a younger woman who he has just married, Mork is happy, but Mindy is not. Special Guest Stars: Conrad Janis as Fred McConnell, Shelley Fabares as Cathy McConnell, Missy Francis as Little Mindy. Note: Jim Staahl's first episode as a regular.
43	18	"The Night They Raided Mind-ski's"	Howard Storm	Ed Scharlach & Tom Tenowich	January 10, 1980
Hoping to help Nelson's political campaign, Mork unknowingly becomes involved with a group of Ku Klux Klan-like hate-mongers. When the fanatics vandalize Mindy's apartment after learning that she is half-Polish, Mork uses his powers to vandalize the group's headquarters, and induce a unique and ironic form of punishment on them.
44	19	"Mork Learns to See"	Howard Storm	Ed Scharlach & Tom Tenowich	January 17, 1980
When Mr. Bickley's blind son, Tom, comes to visit, Mork learns from him to see the world differently. Special Guest Star: Tom Sullivan as Tom Bickley
45	20	"Mork's Vacation"	Howard Storm	Tom Tenowich & Ed Scharlach	January 24, 1980
Needing a vacation, Mork gets Orson's permission to swap bodies with other aliens from Murow and HMM-HMM-HMM. This causes more problems than usual on the home front when the minds of the aliens inhabit Mork's body.
46	21	"Jeanie Loves Mork"	Howard Storm	Story by : Steve Kreinberg & Andy Guerdat; Teleplay by : Ed Scharlach & Tom Tenowich	January 31, 1980
Mindy secretly takes over a lonely hearts column, recognizes a letter from her friend, Jeanie, and advises her on finding "Mr. Right". Meanwhile, Mork is also trying to help Jeanie by hanging out with her, walking her home, and trying to be a good friend. Mork does not realize that Jeanie wants to be "more than friends".
47	22	"Little Orphan Morkie"	Howard Storm	Bruce Kalish & Philip John Taylor	February 7, 1980
Following the events of his last visit to the Department of Immigrants, Mork could be deported unless he either marries an American citizen or finds someone to adopt him. The person who adopts Mork is Exidor.
48	23	"Looney Tunes and Morkie Melodies"	Howard Storm	Tom Tenowich & Ed Scharlach	February 14, 1980
Mork recruits his friends to transform the hour devoted to Nelson's 7:00 a.m. Saturday morning campaign speech into a variety show for kids.
49	24	"Clerical Error"	Howard Storm	April Kelly	February 28, 1980
Mork tries to become a priest, dresses up in a black jacket and white collar, and begins advising church parishioners.
50	25	"Invasion of the Mork Snatchers"	Howard Storm	Tom Tenowich & Ed Scharlach	March 20, 1980
Television commercials cause Mork to become addicted to shopping. This causes problems for Mindy.
51	26	"The Way Mork Were"	Howard Storm	April Kelly & David Misch	May 1, 1980
When marital problems plague Fred, he turns to Mork and Mindy for help. Note: clip show

=== Season 3 (1980–81) ===
No. overall	No. in season	Title	Directed by	Written by	Original release date
52	1	"Putting the Ork Back in Mork"	Howard Storm	Ed Scharlach & Tom Tenowich	November 13, 1980
53	2	"Putting the Ork Back in Mork"	Howard Storm	Ed Scharlach & Tom Tenowich	November 13, 1980
Mindy's efforts to make Mork act like a normal earthling backfire, radically changing his personality. On learning of this situation from Mork and Mindy, Orson sends the most respected Orkan elder to Earth to help Mork regain his Orkan traits. The Elder (whose name is actually the sound of "blowing a raspberry") converts the attic to a typical Orkan house, hoping it will help Mork revert to his old Orkan ways. If Mork fails, he will be sent back to Ork and be ostracized from the other Orkans. Note: One-hour episode; Conrad Janis returns as a regular; debut of new regular Crissy Wilzak as Glenda Faye Comstock
54	3	"Mork in Never-Never Land"	Howard Storm	Wendy Kout	November 20, 1980
Mork discovers that his pen pal is living at an insane asylum and believes that he is Peter Pan.
55	4	"Dueling Skates"	Garry K. Marshall	Dale McRaven & Bruce Johnson	November 27, 1980
To save the daycare center where he works from becoming a parking lot, Mork challenges a champion skater to a Rocky Mountain rollerskating race through the streets of Boulder.
56	5	"Mork the Prankster"	Jeff Chambers	Wendy Kout & George Zateslo	December 4, 1980
Mindy teaches Mork about practical jokes, but Mork does not quite get the hang of them. After a disastrous prank from Mork that involves assembling her jeep in the living room, Mindy moves out to live with Glenda Faye for a while. Glenda convinces Mindy to go back to Mork.
57	6	"Mork, the Monkey's Uncle"	Howard Storm	Story by : James Klein; Teleplay by : Tom Tenowich & Ed Scharlach	December 11, 1980
Mork kidnaps a chimpanzee from the zoo, saying that the animal was being treated badly. Exidor investigates at the zoo, and learns that the chimpanzee's mother was rushed to the hospital. Mork sneaks into the zoo and reunites the chimp with its mother.
58	7	"Gunfight at the Mork-Kay Corral"	Jeff Chambers	Stuart Gillard	December 18, 1980
Mork dresses up as his favorite hero, Squellman the Yellow. One boy at the daycare named Bill idolizes Billy the Kid and starts imitating him in a dangerous game. Mork and Mindy teach him a lesson about violence.
59	8	"Mork's New Look"	Howard Storm	April Kelly	January 1, 1981
Mindy's dad wants to get plastic surgery to look younger. He says that everyone could use a little improvement, which inspires Mork to go to a plastic surgeon. His makeover surprises everyone. Special Guest Star: Shelley Fabares as Cathy
60	9	"Alas, Poor Mork, We Knew Him Well"	Howard Storm	Steve Kreinberg & Andy Guerdat	January 8, 1981
When an insurance salesman scares him about dying from natural disasters, Mork seals himself into a glass bubble in the living room. In the process, he learns some things about living with risks.
61	10	"Mork and the Bum Rap"	Howard Storm	Deborah Raznick & John B. Collins	January 15, 1981
Although Mork does not understand the concept of charity, he is determined to help Mindy raise money for the children's hospital. He tries his "Mork-athon" performance to no avail, and he takes up panhandling to collect money for the children's hospital after meeting a panhandler named Godfrey. Special Guest Star: Ross Martin as Godfrey
62	11	"Mindy Gets Her Job"	Howard Storm	Tom Tenowich & Ed Scharlach	January 22, 1981
Mindy applies for a job at a TV station. After speaking her mind to the station manager, Miles Sternhagen, she gets hired. A blizzard keeps newscasters from getting to the station, so Mindy has to do the whole news show with help from Mork. Special Guest Star: Foster Brooks as Miles Sternhagen
63	12	"Twelve Angry Appliances"	Howard Storm	Jeff Reno & Ron Osborn	February 5, 1981
Mindy has a broken record player that the repairman, Augustus J. Strand, won't fix a second time. Mork wants revenge on Strand, so he puts him on trial before a jury of broken appliances that are in the repair shop. Special Guest Star: Richard Libertini as Augustus J. Strand
64	13	"There's a New Mork in Town"	Howard Storm	Jeff Reno & Ron Osborn	February 12, 1981
Mork is ecstatic when he hears that Orkan VIP, Xerko, is coming to visit him. Xerko turns out to be arrogant and egotistical, and he wants Mork's job of reporting to Orson. Xerko and Mork duel to see who will get the job. Special Guest Star: Lyle Waggoner as Xerko
65	14	"Mork Meets Robin Williams"	Howard Storm	Dale McRaven & Bruce Johnson	February 19, 1981
Robin Williams is in town to do a live Solar Energy Benefit show, but Mindy cannot get an interview. Mork does not think he looks anything like Robin Williams (whose name sounds very much like an Orkan-language obscenity), but he gets chased by a mob of fans. Mork and Mindy get into Robin Williams's dressing room, leading to a face-to-face interview with him. Special Guest Star: Foster Brooks as Miles Sternhagen
66	15	"Mindy, Mindy, Mindy"	Howard Storm	Steve Kreinberg & Andy Guerdat	February 26, 1981
Mindy goes away for the weekend, and Mork goes crazy missing her. The Orkan Elder visits and regrets that Mindy is not there. He tries to clone Mindy, but each clone is worse than the last. Mork must deactivate the defective Mindys before they can cause any trouble.
67	16	"Mork, the Swinging Single"	Howard Storm	Wendy Kout	March 12, 1981
Mindy tells Mork that she thinks that they should date other people. He takes lessons from a swinger named T.N.T., and turns into a party animal.
68	17	"Mork and Mindy Meet Rick and Ruby"	Howard Storm	Dale McRaven & Bruce Johnson	March 26, 1981
Remo fires Ruby, the pregnant singer of the restaurant's band. Mindy takes in Rick and Ruby, and she tries to convince Remo to rehire them. She makes a bet with Remo, so he rehires the group. Ruby goes into labor during a performance, and Mork takes her place.
69	18	"Mork and the Family Reunion"	Howard Storm	April Kelly	April 9, 1981
Fred's successful but domineering brother, Dave, comes to dinner. Mindy accidentally eats an Orkan dessert that makes her behave strangely. Things get worse when Uncle Dave also eats some of the dessert. Special Guest Star: Jonathan Winters as Uncle Dave
70	19	"Old Muggable Mork"	Don Barnhart	John B. Collins & Deborah Raznick	April 16, 1981
Grandma Cora visits, but the trip takes a turn for the worse when she gets mugged. Cora feels very scared, and Mork devises a plan to get even with the muggers. Special Guest Star: Elizabeth Kerr as Cora Hudson
71	20	"I Heard It Through the Morkvine"	Howard Storm	Story by : Jim Fisher & Jim Staahl; Teleplay by : Jeff Reno & Ron Osborn	April 30, 1981
Mork learns about gossip when Mindy gets her own gossip show. Mindy thinks that she will not be able to get those kinds of stories, so Mork gets some for her. While taking her place on the show, he spreads gossip about his friends. Mindy makes Mork apologize on the air. Mork also convinces Mr. Sternhagen to drop the show when he obtains an incriminating picture of him. Special Guest Star: Foster Brooks as Miles Sternhagen
72	21	"Mindy and Mork"	Howard Storm	Brian Levant	May 7, 1981
Mindy is working a lot and Mork cannot adjust. Mork and Mindy switch places for a morning to see how the other feels.
73	22	"Reflections and Regrets"	Howard Storm	Tom Tenowich & Ed Scharlach	May 14, 1981
At Mr. Bickley's 50th birthday party, everyone shares what they regret in their life. Mindy makes excuses to put off her turn, but after everyone leaves, she shares her regret with Mork. Notes: This was Tom Poston's and Crissy Wilczak's final episode as regulars, and the final appearances of Jay Thomas, Gina Hecht and Jim Staahl. No report to Orson is made in this episode.

=== Season 4 (1981–82) ===
No. overall	No. in season	Title	Directed by	Written by	Original release date
74	1	"Limited Engagement"	Bob Claver	Brian Levant	October 8, 1981
After decorating the apartment with flowers, Mork gets down on bended knee and proposes to Mindy. Choosing between logic and her emotions, Mindy tells him that she cannot marry him. Mork asks for 24 hours to get her to change her mind. Orkan Fact: Marriage has been outlawed on Ork since Ork's Dark Ages.
75	2	"The Wedding"	Bob Claver	Alan Eisenstock & Larry Mintz	October 15, 1981
When Orson forbids Mork to marry Mindy because marriage is outlawed on Ork, Mork goes ahead with the wedding anyway. Orson retaliates by turning him into a sheepdog. After a chat with Orson, Mork and Mindy finally get married, with Mork taking Mindy's surname. Special Guest Star: Shelley Fabares as Cathy Orkan Fact: Orkans do not have surnames.
76	3	"The Honeymoon"	Bob Claver	Dale McRaven & Bruce Johnson	October 22, 1981
Mork and Mindy take their honeymoon on Ork, but Mindy becomes a tourist attraction, and is even entered in a pet show. Things keep going wrong, and Mork does not understand Earth honeymoon customs. He confesses to Mindy that he is scared of being married. Orkan Fact: Several aliens, very different in appearance from the human-looking Orkans, are present when Mork and Mindy arrive on Ork. Whether the aliens are also visitors from other planets or are representative of other races native to Ork is unclear. Note: Mork has been sending roses to Ork for three years in order to show the Orkans some of Earth's beauties.
77	4	"Three the Hard Way"	Bob Claver	Richard Rosenstock & Roy Teicher	October 29, 1981
Exidor (who is working as a doctor) determines that Mork is pregnant. Mork gives birth to an egg via his navel. Mindy has trouble accepting that their child is in the egg. The egg grows and hatches a full grown, elderly man as Mork and Mindy's baby (since Orkans age backwards). Special Guest Stars: Tom Poston as Mr. Bickley, Jonathan Winters as Mearth.
78	5	"Mama Mork, Papa Mindy"	Frank Buxton	Wendy Kout & George Zateslo	November 5, 1981
Mearth learns to walk and talk, but calls Mork "Mommy" and Mindy "shoe". Mindy starts avoiding Mearth, until Mork gives her an opportunity to bond with her son. Note: Jonathan Winters's first episode as a regular.
79	6	"My Dad Can't Beat Up Anyone"	Frank Buxton	Dale McRaven & Bruce Johnson	November 12, 1981
Mork becomes insecure when he thinks that he does not have Mearth's respect. Mearth finds Mork's spacesuit, and Mork wears it as a superhero costume. Mork and Mearth go to a bar looking for some bad guys, and they find more than they bargained for.
80	7	"Long Before We Met..."	Frank Buxton	Deborah Raznick & John B. Collins	November 19, 1981
Mork accompanies Mindy to her high school reunion, and gets upset when Mindy associates with an old boyfriend, Steve Sanders. Mork attempts to go back in time to the prom to do away with the boyfriend, and he succeeds. When Mork comes back to reality, Mindy assures him that he is the only one she loves. Special Guest Stars: Paul Reubens as Dickie Nimitz. Note: Crissy Wilczak makes her final appearance on the show as Glenda Faye.
81	8	"Rich Mork, Poor Mork"	Frank Buxton	Richard Rosenstock & Roy Teicher	November 26, 1981
After having to return presents that he bought for Mearth, Mork turns to Exidor for money advice, and invests all the family's money in Exidor's boutique.
82	9	"Alienation"	Don Barnhart	Wendy Kout & George Zateslo	December 3, 1981
Mork and Mindy tell Mearth that he is an alien. Mearth gets upset that he is different from other children, and runs away. He is captured by a cult of Utopians, and Mork and Mindy pretend to be part of the cult to rescue him. Special Guest Stars: Richard Moll, John Larroquette
83	10	"P.S. 2001"	Bob Claver	Cindy Begel & Lisa Kite	December 17, 1981
Mearth wants to go to school, and gets sent to a school on Ork. Mearth comes home crying because the other kids made fun of him, and he hates the teacher Miss Geezba (who is still expecting the book report that Mork lost). Mork and Mindy take Mearth back to class, and Mearth uses his parents as a show-and-tell item, which gains the respect of his classmates. Special Guest Star: Louanne as Miss Geezba
84	11	"Pajama Game II"	Bob Claver	Cindy Begel & Lisa Kite	January 7, 1982
Mearth is allowed to have over some of his Orkan friends, and Zelka ends up spending the night. Mork and Mindy explain the facts of life to Mearth when they assume something happened between him and Zelka.
85	12	"Present Tense"	Bob Claver	Winifred Hervey	January 14, 1982
Mearth goes on a trip with Fred so that Mork and Mindy can have a week to spend alone together. They find that without Mearth at home, they have nothing to talk about. After they have a fight, Mork takes Mindy to the place where they first met. Note: Jonathan Winters does not appear in this episode.
86	13	"Metamorphosis - the TV Show"	Bob Claver	Bob Perlow & Gene Braunstein	January 21, 1982
Mr. Sternhagen, the station manager where Mindy works, is fired by KTNS's new boss, who is very young and ready to fire others. He holds a party to meet the employees' families. Meanwhile, while playing with an old train set, a short-circuit switches Mork's mind with Mearth's.
87	14	"Drive, She Said"	Bob Claver	Lesa Kite & Cindy Begel	February 4, 1982
Mindy is tired of working all day and having to go out on errands in the evening. Mork goes to a driving school, where T.N.T. is his instructor. When Mork takes his driving test, he thinks his examiner is the devil.
88	15	"I Don't Remember Mama"	Bob Claver	John B. Collins & Deborah Raznick	February 11, 1982
Mork has been making boring reports to Orson, so Orson erases all of Mork's memories of his family. Mindy and Mearth do everything that they can for Mork to remember them. Mindy finally breaks the memory block by kissing him.
89	16	"Mork, Mindy and Mearth Meet MILT"	Bob Claver	Wendy Kout & George Zateslo	February 18, 1982
Mork uses Orkan components to assemble a home computer named M.I.L.T. for Mearth's science project. MILT is so sophisticated that it develops a mind of its own, and it decides to hold hostage its creator, Mindy and Mearth. Special Guest Stars: John Houseman as the voice of MILT, William Shatner as himself
90	17	"Midas Mork"	Bob Claver	Wendy Kout & George Zateslo	April 15, 1982
After hearing the fairytale of Rumpelstiltskin spinning straw into gold, Mork and Mearth try to make polyester into gold. Mindy dreams that they become millionaires, and live in a mansion with servants.
91	18	"Cheerleaders in Chains"	Bob Claver	Story by : Cindy Begel & Lisa Kite; Teleplay by : Winifred Hervey	April 22, 1982
Mindy is jailed when she will not reveal a source for one of her stories. Mork tries to go through political channels to get her out. Unsuccessful, he tries to spring her, but gets arrested. Guest Star: Barbara Billingsley as Louise
92	19	"Gotta Run: Part 1"	Don Barnhart	Cindy Begel & Lisa Kite	May 6, 1982
Mork and Mindy are overjoyed when they meet Kalnik, an alien from Neptune who has also married an earthling named Tracy. Things go awry when they become suspicious of Kalnik's true intentions. Tracy reveals that she is a bomb, demolishing Mork and Mindy's apartment, and sending them on the run. Guest Stars: Joe Regalbuto as Kalnik and Ilene Graff as Tracy
93	20	"Gotta Run: Part 2"	Bob Claver	Richard Gurman	May 13, 1982
After Kalnik has bombed their apartment, leaving them on the run, Mork, Mindy and Mearth decide that their only chance of surviving is to go public about Mork's real roots. Guest Star: Joe Regalbuto as Kalnik
94	21	"Gotta Run: Part 3"	Bob Claver	Alan Eisenstock & Larry Mintz	May 20, 1982
Kalnik discovers Mork and Mindy in their demolished apartment. Mork clicks the heels of his magic shoes in an effort to escape with Mindy to Rome, but the shoes have been damaged, and Mork and Mindy wind up with prehistoric tribesmen in an Okus cave. Guest Star: Joe Regalbuto as Kalnik
95	22	"The Mork Report"	Robin Williams	Winifred Hervey	May 27, 1982
Mork bucks for a promotion from leader Orson on planet Ork, and unintentionally comes up with a report on how to stay happily married on Earth. Note: This episode was filmed before the "Gotta Run" trilogy, but was aired last due to the show's cancelation in order to give the series appropriate closure.

== See also ==
- List of Happy Days episodes
