= Laverne & Shirley (1981 TV series) =

1981 American animated television series

- Genre: Comedy
- Developed by: Duane Poole; Tom Swale
- Directed by: George Gordon; Carl Urbano; Rudy Zamora
- Voices of: Penny Marshall; Cindy Williams (1981–82); Lynne Marie Stewart (1982); Ron Palillo; Kenneth Mars; Henry Winkler (1982); Frank Welker (1982)
- Composer: Hoyt Curtin
- Country of origin: United States
- Original language: English
- No. of seasons: 2
- No. of episodes: 21

Production
- Executive producers: William Hanna; Joseph Barbera
- Producers: Duane Poole; Art Scott; Tom Swale
- Running time: 30 minutes
- Production companies: Hanna-Barbera Productions; Paramount Television

Original release
- Network: ABC
- Release: October 10, 1981 – November 13, 1982

Related
- Laverne & Shirley; Happy Days

Laverne & Shirley, also known as Laverne & Shirley in the Army, is an American animated television series produced by Hanna-Barbera Productions and Paramount Television broadcast on ABC from October 10, 1981, to November 13, 1982. It is a spin-off of the live-action sitcom Laverne & Shirley with the title characters voiced by Penny Marshall and Cindy Williams and was loosely based on the 1979 two-part episode "We're in the Army, Now" in which Laverne and Shirley enlisted in the Army. Fellow ABC Saturday Morning cartoon Thundarr the Barbarian was cancelled by ABC to make room for Laverne & Shirley on their schedule; it was not as popular as the show it replaced.

== Overview ==
The series is set at Camp Fillmore and follows the comic antics of roommates Laverne DeFazio and Shirley Feeney as privates with the U.S. Army. They wind up getting involved in clandestine escapades with their immediate superior, a pig named Sgt. Squealy, who is always threatening to report them to his superior, Sgt. Turnbuckle. The series aired for one season of 13 episodes from October 10, 1981, to January 2, 1982.

The following season, the series was re-titled Laverne & Shirley with Special Guest Star The Fonz and combined with a half-hour adaptation of the 1978–1982 sitcom Mork & Mindy to form the Mork & Mindy/Laverne & Shirley/Fonz Hour, which lasted for one season. During the second season, Laverne and Shirley were joined by the characters of The Fonz (voiced by Henry Winkler) and his anthropomorphic dog Mr. Cool (voiced by Frank Welker; from the 1980–81 animated series The Fonz and the Happy Days Gang) working as mechanics in the army camp's motorpool. In August 1982, Cindy Williams quit her role as Shirley on the live-action sitcom Laverne & Shirley and, consequently, Williams' role in the animated series was taken over by Lynne Marie Stewart. Only eight episodes were produced from September 25 to November 13, 1982.

== Cast ==
- Penny Marshall as Laverne DeFazio
- Cindy Williams (Season 1), and Lynne Marie Stewart (Season 2), as Shirley Feeney
- Ron Palillo as Sgt. Squeally
- Kenneth Mars as Sgt. Turnbuckle
- Henry Winkler (Season 2) as Arthur "The Fonz" Fonzarelli
- Frank Welker as Mr. Cool (Season 2), Additional voices

=== Additional voices ===
- Marlene Aragon (Season 1)
- Rene Auberjonois (Season 1)
- Michael Bell
- Val Bettin (Season 2)
- William Callaway (Season 2)
- Mary Ann Chin (Season 1)
- Philip Lewis Clarke (Season 2)
- Didi Conn (Season 1)
- Henry Corden (Season 1)
- Brad Crandall (Season 1)
- Tandy Cronyn (Season 1)
- Peter Cullen (Season 1)
- Keene Curtis
- Julie McWirter Dees (Season 2)
- Rick Dees (Season 1)
- Jeff Doucette (Season 2)
- Dick Erdman
- Kathy Garver (Season 1)
- Joanie Gerber (Season 1)
- Bob Holt (Season 1)
- Helen Hunt (Season 2)
- Buster Jones (Season 1)
- Jackie Joseph (Season 1)
- Zale Kessler (Season 1)
- Allan Lurie (Season 1)
- Amanda McBroom (Season 1)
- Mitzi McCall (Season 1)
- Joe Medalis (Season 1)
- Allan Melvin (Season 2)
- Pat Parris (Season 1)
- Clare Peck (Season 1)
- Patrick Pinney (Season 1)
- Henry Polic (Season 1)
- Lou Richards (Season 1)
- Bob Ridgley (Season 1)
- Al Robertson (Season 2)
- Marilyn Schreffler (Season 2)
- Hal Smith (Season 2)
- John Stephenson (Season 1)
- Alexandra Stoddart (Season 1)
- Russi Taylor (Season 1)
- Fred Travalena (Season 1)
- B. J. Ward (Season 1)
- Lennie Weinrib (Season 2)

== Episodes ==
=== Season 1: Laverne & Shirley in the Army (1981–82) ===
No. overall	No. in season	Title	Written by	Original release date
1	1	"Invasion of the Booby Hatchers"	Duane Poole & Tom Swale	October 10, 1981
The girls accidentally hijack a secret army rocket and get captured by aliens, who want to invade Earth.
2	2	"Jungle Jumpers"	Ray Parker & Barry Blitzer	October 17, 1981
The girls parachute in the middle of a jungle island and find themselves caught between the Zambulu tribe and a giant ape.
3	3	"Naval Fluff"	Haskell Barkin	October 24, 1981
Assigned to the Navy, the girls are caught in the middle of a target test, while enemy spies are about to attack the laser cannon ship.
4	4	"April Fools in Paris"	David R. Toddman, Duane Poole & Tom Swale	October 31, 1981
Laverne & Shirley are on special assignment in Paris on April Fool's Day.
5	5	"I Only Have Ice for You"	Jack Mendelsohn, Duane Poole & Tom Swale	November 7, 1981
Fed up with kitchen duties and Squealy, the ladies make a transfer to an entertainment unit, only to have Squealy trick them and falsely sends the privates to Antarctica, where the plan backfires upon arrival. Unfortunately, they're about to be in for a chilly reception: the Army base has been abandoned since 1946, and the current occupants are a sinister scientist, his assistant, and pet polar bear, who are planning to take over the world by melting the continent and flooding the planet.
6	6	"When the Moon Comes Over the Werewolf"	David R. Toddman, Duane Poole & Tom Swale	November 14, 1981
Laverne, Shirley, and Squealy end up on an island, where they discover Dr. Yarkoff and his henchman, Talbot are planning to launch werewolf spray from a rocket. Before the villains are defeated, both Talbot and Laverne become werewolves.
7	7	"Bigfoot"	David Villaire & Coslough Johnson	November 21, 1981
Sgt. Turnbuckle refuses to believe that the privates have seen a Bigfoot creature until he sees it for himself.
8	8	"Two Mini Cooks"	Ray Parker, Martha Humphreys & Norman Maurer	November 28, 1981
Laverne & Shirley are sent to the kitchen for their punishment in another goof-up.
9	9	"Super Wacs"	Ray Parker, Duane Poole & Tom Swale	December 5, 1981
An Army vs. Navy basketball games has been scheduled. Laverne and Shirley sign up so they can get out of their regular duties. They have no idea what is in store for them, as the Navy players are nearly professional players and the practices that they go through are harder than the duties that they were trying to get away from.
10	10	"Meanie Genie"	David Villaire	December 12, 1981
Laverne and Shirley discover a bottle while on maneuvers. When they clean it up, a genie appears, but he is not happy at having been disturbed from his deep sleep.
11	11	"Tokyo--Ho, Ho"	Diane Duane	December 19, 1981
Laverne & Shirley are off to Tokyo for a special mission.
12	12	"The Dark Knight"	David Villaire	December 26, 1981
Shirley slips and hits her head, sending her and Laverne off to a dream state of the Middle Ages, where they are forced to fight an evil knight.
13	13	"Super Duper Trooper"	David Villaire	January 2, 1982
Evil mastermind Tony Glut kidnaps the army football teams to steal their strength for his Crusher robot. His plan backfires when Shirley, Laverne and Squealy infiltrate the laboratory.

=== Season 2: Laverne & Shirley with Special Guest Star The Fonz (1982) ===
No. overall	No. in season	Title	Original release date
14	1	"The Speed Demon Get-Away Caper"	September 25, 1982
When the Fonz is wrongly accused and imprisoned for stealing a car he was working on, Laverne and Shirley (along with Squealy) go on a quest to capture the real criminal.
15	2	"Swamp Monsters Speak with Forked Face"	October 2, 1982
Laverne and Shirley (along with Squealy, The Fonz and Mr. Cool) board a boat to obtain photographic proof of a two-headed swamp monster.
16	3	"Movie Madness"	October 9, 1982
Laverne and Shirley masquerade as stuntmen in hopes of meeting star Lance Velour when a movie is being filmed at the military base.
17	4	"One Million Laughs B.C."	October 16, 1982
Laverne and Shirley are sent through a time warp into prehistoric times in a jeep that Fonzie has been working on.
18	5	"The Robot Recruit"	October 23, 1982
A robot called M.A.B.E.L. is sent to the camp to sabotage the military games, for which Laverne and Shirley receive the blame. But when M.A.B.E.L. gets broken, the Fonz gives her a repair and tune-up.
19	6	"All the President's Girls"	October 30, 1982
20	7	"Laverne and Shirley and the Beanstalk"	November 6, 1982
21	8	"Raiders of the Lost Pork"	November 13, 1982

== Home media ==
On November 5, 2019, the 13-episode first season was released as a made-on-demand DVD-R by CBS Home Entertainment and Paramount Home Entertainment.
