= Mork & Mindy/Laverne & Shirley/Fonz Hour =

- Directed by: George Gordon; Bob Hathcock; John Kimball; Rudy Larriva; Carl Urbano; Rudy Zamora
- Starring: Robin Williams; Pam Dawber; Conrad Janis; Henry Winkler
- Voices of: Ralph James; Stan Jones; Ron Palillo; Lynne Marie Stewart; Frank Welker; Shavar Ross; Mark L. Taylor
- Composer: Hoyt Curtin
- Country of origin: United States
- Original language: English
- No. of seasons: 1
- No. of episodes: 27

Production
- Executive producers: William Hanna; Joseph Barbera; Joe Ruby; Ken Spears
- Producers: Joe Ruby; Art Scott; Ken Spears
- Running time: 60 minutes
- Production companies: Hanna-Barbera Productions; Ruby-Spears Enterprises; Paramount Television

Original release
- Network: ABC
- Release: September 25, 1982 – September 3, 1983

Related
- The Fonz and the Happy Days Gang; Laverne & Shirley in the Army; Mork & Mindy; Laverne & Shirley; Happy Days

Mork & Mindy/Laverne & Shirley/Fonz Hour is a 1982 American animated television series produced by Hanna-Barbera Productions and Ruby-Spears Enterprises in association with Paramount Television, featuring animated versions of characters from the live-action sitcoms Mork & Mindy, Laverne & Shirley and Happy Days (Fonzie), all part of the same franchise. This Saturday morning series lasted for one season on ABC.

This show was divided into two segments: Mork & Mindy and Laverne & Shirley with the Fonz. The Laverne & Shirley half-hour was the second season of Laverne & Shirley in the Army, with the addition of The Fonz and his dog Mr. Cool from the earlier cartoon The Fonz and the Happy Days Gang.

== Segments ==
=== Mork & Mindy ===
In the Mork & Mindy segment, in which Robin Williams and Pam Dawber voice the title characters, a teenaged Mork is sent to Earth from planet Ork to observe the lives of human teenagers and enroll in a local school. As on the original show, Mindy McConnell and her father Fred (voiced by Conrad Janis) are the only Earthlings who know that he is an alien and he sends telepathic reports of his experiences to Orkan ruler Orson (voiced by an uncredited Ralph James). Unlike the original show, Mork is accompanied by his Orkan pet, a pink, six-legged dog-like creature named Doing (voiced by Frank Welker) which is pronounced as "Doyng". Other characters in the show include Eugene (voiced by Shavar Ross), Hamilton (voiced by Mark L. Taylor), and Principal Caruthers (voiced by an uncredited Stanley Jones).

==== Episodes of Mork & Mindy ====
No.	Title	Original release date
1	"Who's Minding the Brat?"	September 25, 1982
Mindy has Mork babysit while she takes her dad to the airport.
2	"The Greatest Schmoe on Earth"	September 25, 1982
3	"To Ork or Not to Ork"	October 2, 1982
4	"Orkan Without a Cause"	October 2, 1982
5	"Mork Man vs. Ork Man"	October 9, 1982
6	"Which Witch Is the Witch"	October 9, 1982
7	"Every Doing Has His Day"	October 16, 1982
Mork helps Doing earn his way back in the house.
8	"Beauty or the Beast"	October 16, 1982
9	"Morkel and Hyde"	October 23, 1982
10	"The Wimp"	October 23, 1982
11	"Ride 'em Morkboy"	October 30, 1982
12	"Meet Mork's Mom"	October 30, 1982
13	"Muddle in the Huddle"	November 6, 1982
14	"The Incredible Shrinking Mork"	November 6, 1982
In an effort to retrieve Mork's watch stolen from a rat, Mork, Mindy and Doing shrink using a special device.
15	"The Invisible Mork"	November 13, 1982
Mork drinks strawberry juice that makes him invisible, then takes advantage of his invisibility by trying to fight a bully to win Mindy's affections.
16	"The Fluke Spook"	November 13, 1982
17	"Mayhem for the Mayor"	November 20, 1982
18	"Coo Coo Caveboy"	November 20, 1982
19	"A Treasure Ain't No Pleasure"	November 27, 1982
20	"The Mork with the Midas Touch"	November 27, 1982
21	"Extra Terrestrial Toddler"	December 4, 1982
22	"Time Slipper Slip-Up"	December 4, 1982
23	"Super Mork"	December 11, 1982
24	"Mork P.I."	December 11, 1982
25	"Monkey on My Back Pack"	December 18, 1982
26	"On Your Mork, Get Set, Go!"	December 18, 1982
This episode was pre-empted on January 1, 1983 due to coverage of the Tournament of Roses Parade. The exact date this episode was shown, if at all, is uncertain.

=== Laverne & Shirley with The Fonz ===
This segment is a continuation of Laverne & Shirley in the Army, the only difference being the addition of The Fonz (voiced by Henry Winkler) and his dog Mr. Cool (voiced by Frank Welker; from The Fonz and the Happy Days Gang) as mechanics in the army camp's motor pool. Cindy Williams quit her role as Shirley on the live-action sitcom Laverne & Shirley in August 1982. Conversely, Williams' role in the animated series was taken over by friend Lynne Marie Stewart. Only eight episodes were produced. Thus, the existing segments produced up to that point were rerun for the rest of the series. Except for a few publicity cel paintings, no further plans for the series were made.

==== Episodes of Laverne & Shirley with The Fonz ====
No.	Title	Original release date
1	"The Speed Demon Get-Away Caper"	September 25, 1982
When the Fonz is wrongly accused and imprisoned for stealing a car he was working on, Laverne and Shirley (along with Squealy) go on a quest to capture the real criminal.
2	"Swamp Monsters Speak with Forked Face"	October 2, 1982
Laverne and Shirley (along with Squealy, The Fonz and Mr. Cool) board a boat to obtain photographic proof of a two-headed swamp monster.
3	"Movie Madness"	October 9, 1982
Laverne and Shirley masquerade as stuntmen in hopes of meeting star Lance Velour when a movie is being filmed at the military base.
4	"One Million Laughs B.C."	October 16, 1982
Laverne and Shirley are sent through a time warp into prehistoric times in a jeep that Fonzie has been working on.
5	"The Robot Recruit"	October 23, 1982
A robot called M.A.B.E.L. is sent to the camp to sabotage the military games, for which Laverne and Shirley receive the blame. But when M.A.B.E.L. gets broken, the Fonz gives her a repair and tune-up.
6	"All the President's Girls"	October 30, 1982
7	"Laverne and Shirley and the Beanstalk"	November 6, 1982
8	"Raiders of the Lost Pork"	November 13, 1982

== Cast ==
=== Cast for Mork & Mindy ===
- Robin Williams as Mork
- Pam Dawber as Mindy McConnell
- Conrad Janis as Frederick McConnell
- Ralph James as Orson
- Stan Jones as Principal Caruthers
- Shavar Ross as Eugene
- Mark L. Taylor as Hamilton
- Frank Welker as Doing

=== Cast for Laverne & Shirley with The Fonz ===
- Penny Marshall as Laverne DeFazio
- Henry Winkler as Arthur "Fonzie"/"The Fonz" Fonzarelli
- Lynne Marie Stewart as Shirley Feeney
- Kenneth Mars as Sgt. Turnbuckle
- Ron Palillo as Sgt. Squealy
- Frank Welker as Mr. Cool
