= Mork & Mindy =

American television sitcom (1978–1982)

- Genre: Sitcom; Science fiction; Fantasy; Farce; Slapstick
- Created by: Garry Marshall; Dale McRaven; Joe Glauberg
- Starring: Robin Williams; Pam Dawber; Elizabeth Kerr; Conrad Janis; Tom Poston; Jay Thomas; Gina Hecht; Jim Staahl; Crissy Wilzak; Jonathan Winters
- Theme music composer: Perry Botkin Jr.
- Country of origin: United States
- Original language: English
- No. of seasons: 4
- No. of episodes: 91 (original run); 95 (syndication); (list of episodes)

Production
- Executive producers: Anthony W. Marshall; Garry Marshall
- Producers: Bruce Johnson; Brian Levant; Dale McRaven; Ed Scharlach; Tom Tenowich
- Camera setup: Multi-camera
- Running time: 22–24 minutes
- Production companies: Henderson Production Company, Inc.; Miller-Milkis Productions (1978–1981); Miller-Milkis-Boyett Productions (1981–1982); Paramount Television

Original release
- Network: ABC
- Release: September 14, 1978 – May 27, 1982

Related
- Love, American Style; Happy Days; Laverne & Shirley; Blansky's Beauties; Out of the Blue; Joanie Loves Chachi

Mork & Mindy is an American television sitcom that aired on ABC from September 14, 1978, to May 27, 1982. A spin-off after a highly successful episode of Happy Days, "My Favorite Orkan", it starred Robin Williams as Mork, an extraterrestrial who comes to Earth from the planet Ork, and Pam Dawber as Mindy McConnell, his human friend, roommate, and eventual love interest.

== History and episodes ==
=== Premise and initial success ===
Mork first appears in the Happy Days season five episode "My Favorite Orkan", which aired in February 1978, and is a take on the 1960s sitcom My Favorite Martian. The producers wanted to feature a spaceman to capitalize on the popularity of the recently released Star Wars film. Williams's character, Mork, attempts to take Richie Cunningham to his planet of Ork as a specimen, but he is foiled by Fonzie. In the initial broadcast, it turned out to be a dream of Richie's. However, when Mork proved popular, the syndicated version was re-edited with a scene filmed showing Mork erasing the experience from everyone's minds.

The character of Mork was played by then-unknown Robin Williams, who impressed producer Garry Marshall with his quirky comic ability as soon as they met. Dom DeLuise and Roger Rees were offered the role, but both passed. Richard Lewis and Jeff Altman were considered. When Williams was asked to take a seat at the audition, he sat on his head, and Marshall cast him on the spot, later wryly commenting that Williams was the only alien who auditioned.

Mork & Mindy is set in Boulder, Colorado, in the then-present-day late 1970s and early 1980s, as opposed to the Happy Days setting of Milwaukee in the mid-1950s and early 1960s. Mork explains to Richie that he is from the "future": the 1970s.

| Season | Episodes | Originally released | | Rank | Rating |
| Season | Episodes | First released | Last released | Rank | Rating |
|---|---|---|---|---|---|
| 1 | 25 | September 14, 1978 | May 10, 1979 | 3 | 28.6 (Tied with Happy Days) |
| 2 | 26 | September 16, 1979 | May 1, 1980 | 27 | 20.2 |
| 3 | 22 | November 13, 1980 | May 14, 1981 | 49 | —N/a |
| 4 | 22 | October 8, 1981 | May 27, 1982 | 60 | —N/a |

=== First season ===
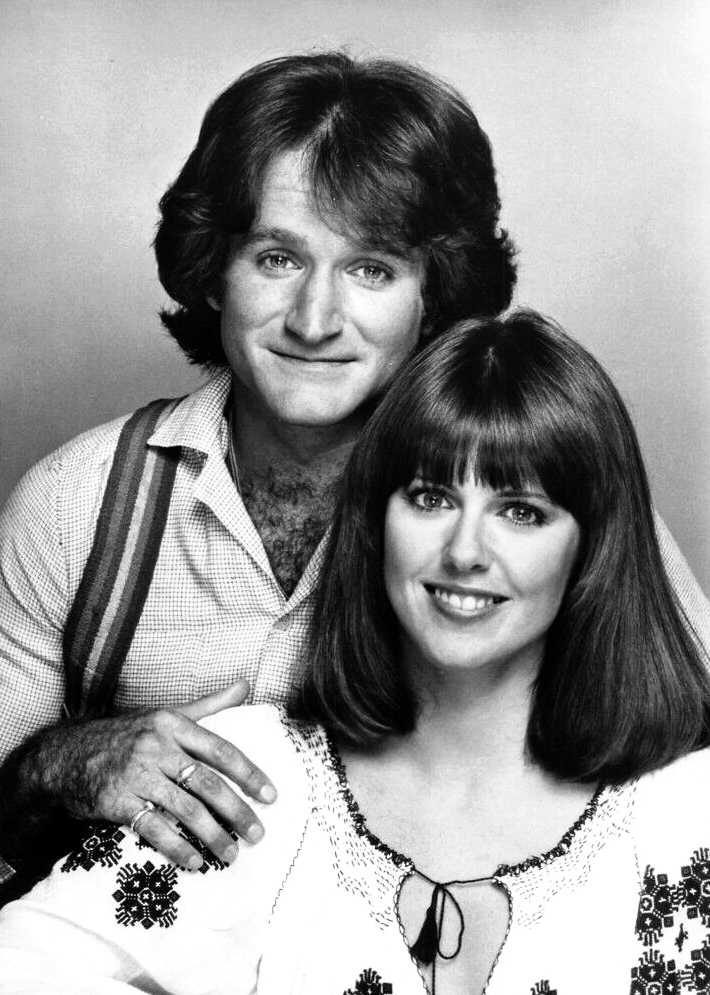
Williams and Dawber in a promotional photo, 1978

Mork arrives on Earth in an egg-shaped spacecraft. He has been assigned to observe human behavior by Orson, his mostly unseen and long-suffering superior (voiced by Ralph James). Orson has sent Mork to get him off Ork, where humor is not permitted. Attempting to fit in, Mork dresses in an Earth suit, but wears it backwards. Landing in Boulder, Colorado, he encounters Mindy McConnell (Pam Dawber), who is upset after an argument with her boyfriend, and offers assistance. Because of his odd garb, she mistakes him for a priest and is taken in by his willingness to listen (in fact, simply observing her behavior). When Mindy notices his backward suit and unconventional behavior, she asks who he really is, and he innocently tells her the truth. She promises to keep his identity a secret and allows him to move into her attic. Mindy's father, Fred (Conrad Janis), objects to his daughter living with a man (particularly one as bizarre as Mork), but Fred's mother-in-law and Mindy's grandmother, Cora (Elizabeth Kerr), approves of Mork and the living arrangement. Mindy and Cora work at Fred's music store, where Cora gives violin lessons to Eugene (Jeffrey Jacquet), a 10-year-old boy who becomes Mork's friend. Also seen occasionally are Mindy's snooty old high school friend, Susan (Morgan Fairchild), and the possibly insane Exidor (Robert Donner).

Storylines usually center on Mork's attempts to understand human behavior and American culture as Mindy helps him to adjust to life on Earth. It usually ends up frustrating Mindy, as Mork can do things only according to Orkan customs. For example, lying to someone or not informing them it will rain is considered a practical joke (called "splinking") on Ork. At the end of each episode, Mork reports to Orson what he has learned about Earth. These end-of-show summaries allow Mork to humorously comment on social norms.

Mork's greeting is "Na-Nu Na-Nu" (pronounced /ˈnɑːnuː ˈnɑːnuː/), with a hand gesture similar to Mr. Spock's Vulcan salute from Star Trek combined with a handshake. It became a popular catchphrase at the time, as did "Shazbot" (/ˈʃæzbɒt/), an Orkan interjection that Mork uses. Mork says "KO" in place of "OK".

Mork & Mindy was Robin Williams's first major acting role. Scripts were shorter than on Happy Days, with notes specifying, "Robin will do something here", to let Williams improvise. However, his improvisations often had to be replaced with pre-written "ad libs" scripted by a large team, due to Williams's true ad libs being unsuitable for a general television audience.

The series was extremely popular in its first season. The Nielsen ratings were very high, ranking at 3, behind Laverne & Shirley (at 1) and Three's Company (at 2), both on ABC, which was the highest-rated network in the U.S. in 1978. The show gained higher ratings than Happy Days, the series that had spawned it, at number 4. However, network management sought to improve the show in several ways. This was done in conjunction with what is known in the industry as counterprogramming, a technique in which a successful show is moved opposite a ratings hit on another network. The show was moved from Thursdays, where it outrated CBS's The Waltons, to Sundays, where it replaced the canceled sci-fi series Battlestar Galactica. The show then aired against two highly rated shows: NBC's anthology series titled The Sunday Big Event, and CBS's revamped continuation of All in the Family, titled Archie Bunker's Place.

=== Second season ===
The second season saw an attempt to seek younger viewers, and premiered a new disco arrangement of the gentle theme tune.

The characters of Fred and Cora were dropped from the regular cast. It was explained that Fred went on tour as a conductor with an orchestra, taking Cora with him. Fred and Cora made return appearances in later episodes. Recurring characters Susan and Eugene made no further appearances after season one, and were never mentioned again.

New cast members were added. Among the new supporting characters were Remo and Jeanie DaVinci (Jay Thomas and Gina Hecht), a brother and sister from New York City who owned a new neighborhood deli where Mork and Mindy now spent a lot of time. Also added as regulars were their grumpy neighbor, Mr. Bickley (who was occasionally seen in the first season, and ironically worked as a verse writer for a greeting-card company), portrayed by Tom Poston, along with Nelson Flavor (Jim Staahl), Mindy's snooty cousin who ran for city council.

The show's main focus was no longer on Mork's slapstick attempts to adjust to the new world that he was in, but on the relationship between Mork and Mindy on a romantic level. Also, some of the focus was on Mork trying to find a steady job.

Because of the abrupt changes to the show and time slot, ratings slipped dramatically (dropping to 27th place). The show was quickly moved back to its previous time slot, and efforts were made to return to the core of the series; however, ratings did not recover.

=== Third season ===
For the third season, Jeanie, Remo and Nelson were retained as regulars, with Jeanie and Remo having opened a restaurant. Nelson was no longer into politics, and wore more casual clothes.

Mindy's father and grandmother returned to the series. The show acknowledged this attempt to restore its original premise, with the third season's hourlong opener, titled "Putting the Ork Back in Mork".

Several supporting characters were added to the lineup. Joining were Lola and Stephanie, two children from the day-care center where Mork worked. Also added was Mindy's close friend Glenda Faye Comstock (Crissy Wilzak), a lovely young widow on whom Nelson develops a crush. Wilzak lasted one season as a regular.

When these ideas failed to improve ratings, many wilder ideas were tried in an attempt to capitalize on Williams's comedic talents. The season ended at number 49 in the ratings.

=== Fourth season ===
Despite the show's steady decline, ABC agreed to a fourth season of Mork & Mindy, but executives wanted changes. The show began to include special guest stars this year.

At the beginning of the fourth season, Mork and Mindy got married. Jonathan Winters, one of Williams's idols, joined the cast as their child, Mearth. Because of the different Orkan physiology, Mork laid an egg, which grew and hatched into the much older Winters. Winters had previously appeared in a Season 3 episode as Dave McConnell (Mindy's uncle and Fred's brother). It had previously been explained that Orkans aged "backward", thus explaining Mearth's appearance, and that of his teacher, Miss Geezba (portrayed by then-11-year-old actress Louanne Sirota). After four seasons and 95 episodes, Mork & Mindy was canceled in summer 1982. The show ended at 60th place at season's end.

== Characters ==
=== Main characters ===
- Mork (portrayed by Robin Williams) – An alien from the planet Ork sent to observe human behavior. Mork mentions many times that Orkan scientists grew him in a test tube.
- Mindy McConnell (portrayed by Pam Dawber) – A female human who finds Mork and teaches him about human behavior. Eventually falls in love, marries Mork and raises an Orkan "child".
- Fredrick "Fred" McConnell (portrayed by Conrad Janis) – Mindy's father, a widower with conservative values. In the first season, Fred owned a music shop with Cora. In the third season, Fred became the conductor of the Boulder Symphony Orchestra.
- Grandma Cora Hudson (portrayed by Elizabeth Kerr) – Mindy's less-conservative, rock-loving grandmother and Fred's mother-in-law.
- Franklin Delano Bickley (portrayed by Tom Poston) – Mindy's downstairs neighbor. He has a job involving writing greeting cards. At first, Franklin is a total grump and always complains about noise. In time however, he warms up and becomes a friend to Mork and Mindy and the gang.
- Mearth (portrayed by Jonathan Winters) – The "child" of Mork and Mindy and godson of Orson. Because of Orkan physiology, Orkans age backwards starting with elderly adult bodies, but with the mind of a child and regressing to feeble "old" kids.
- Remo DaVinci (portrayed by Jay Thomas) – The co-owner of The New York Delicatessen in season 2 and DaVinci's Restaurant in season 3. The character was dropped after season 3.
- Jeanie DaVinci (portrayed by Gina Hecht) – The sister of Remo DaVinci and co-owner of The New York Delicatessen in season 2, and DaVinci's Restaurant in season 3. The character was dropped after season 3.
- Nelson Flavor (portrayed by Jim Staahl) – The strait-laced, driven, yet aloof cousin of Mindy with dreams of political power. The character is dropped after season 3.
- Glenda Faye Comstock (portrayed by Crissy Wilzak) – Mindy's friend and recent widow who becomes the love interest of Nelson, seen only in Season 3.
- Orson (voiced by Ralph James) – Mork's mostly unseen and long-suffering superior who has sent Mork to Earth to get him off-world because humor is not permitted on Ork. Although often perplexed and exasperated with Mork's light-hearted demeanor and casual humorous views regarding his mission and life in general, Orson maintains at least a grudging respect for Mork, is patient and thoughtfully curious when receiving Mork's weekly reports, and generally allows Mork the freedom to do as he pleases while gathering information on Earth.

=== Recurring characters ===
- Eugene (portrayed by Jeffrey Jacquet) – A ten-year-old boy who takes violin lessons from Cora, and befriends Mork in Season 1. He and Mork invariably go through elaborate incantations and pantomime when greeting each other, and Mork occasionally consults Eugene regarding social matters; Eugene is always more than willing to assist, although he often feels a bit awkward advising someone so much taller and older than himself.
- Arnold Wanker (portrayed by Logan Ramsey) – The landlord of Fred and Cora's music store in Season 1. He dies in Fred's music store, but Mork, misinterpreting the comments made to his wife, brings him back to life (a "one-in-a-billion" chance).
- Susan Taylor (portrayed by Morgan Fairchild) – Mindy's snooty ex-friend from high school who was seen only in Season 1. In the episode "Mork's First Christmas", a glimpse was shown into why Susan is such a shallow person.
- Exidor (portrayed by Robert Donner) – An odd man (with possible mental illness) who regards himself as a prophet. He often appears wearing a flowing white robe with a brown sash. He recognizes Mork as an alien, but nobody believes him.
- Mr. Miles Sternhagen (portrayed by Foster Brooks) – Mindy's boss when she gets a job at a local TV station. He is overbearing and demanding of Mindy when sober, but occasionally turns up drunk and cheerful (per Brooks's famous "drunk" act).
- Todd Norman "TNT" Taylor (portrayed by Bill Kirchenbauer) – An obnoxious and arrogant womanizer. He later teaches Mork to drive at the FastLane Driving School.
- Cathy McConnell (portrayed by Shelley Fabares) – Fred's new younger wife and Mindy's stepmother, seen in Seasons 2–4.
- Lola and Stephanie (portrayed by Amy Tenowich and Stephanie Kayano) – Two children from the daycare center where Mork works later in the series, during Season 3. Lola is a young philosopher and Stephanie is a chubby girl who loves to eat.
- Billy (portrayed by Corey Feldman) – A daycare-center child who appeared during Season 3. He wants to be like his namesake, Billy the Kid. Mork introduces him to the Orkan hero Squellman the Yellow.
- Bebo (vocal effects provided by an uncredited Gregg Berger) – Mork's ball-of-fur pet who spoke Orkan gibberish and was introduced and seen only in Season 3. He was occasionally seen around the house and stood by Mork during his reports to Orson. Although Gregg Berger provided the vocal effects of Bebo in the first appearance, the recordings were archived for later use. The credits had Bebo listed as being portrayed by "himself".

== Connections to other shows ==
Actor-director Jerry Paris was inspired to create the character of Mork after directing an episode of The Dick Van Dyke Show, titled "It May Look Like a Walnut", in which Van Dyke's Rob Petrie has a dream in which he believes the Earth has been surreptitiously invaded by walnut-eating aliens who steal humans' thumbs and imaginations. Series creator Carl Reiner had written the episode, which was the 20th in the show's second season, and the 50th episode produced. When Paris moved on to direct Happy Days, he introduced Mork in a similarly atypical season-five episode, titled "My Favorite Orkan". In it, Richie tells everyone that he has seen a flying saucer, but no one believes him. Fonzie tells him that people make up stories about UFOs because their lives are average, or "humdrum".

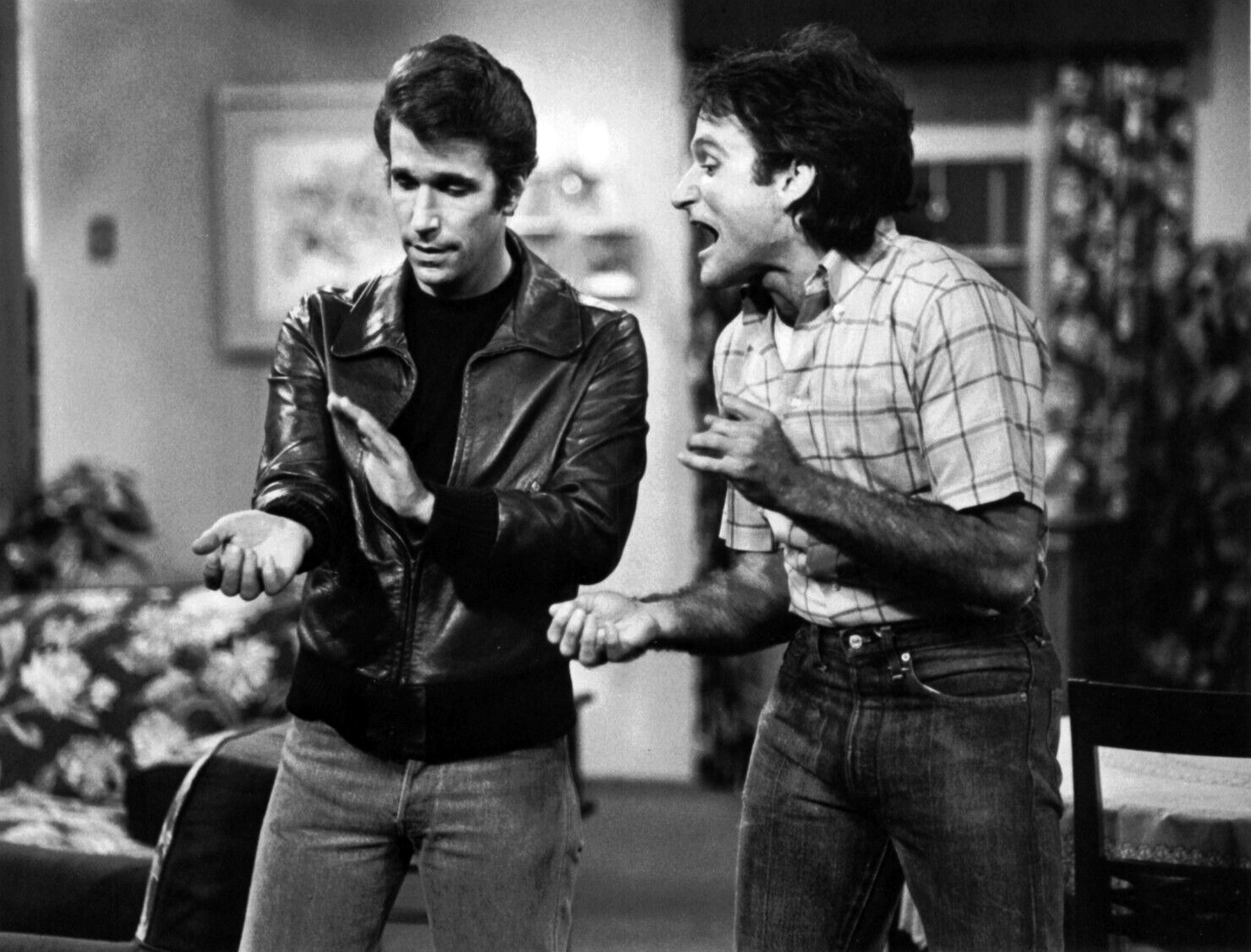
In the pilot episode, Fonzie is unamused by Mork's antics.

While Richie is home alone, Mork walks in. Mork freezes everyone but Richie with his finger, and says he was sent to Earth to find a "humdrum" human to take back to Ork. Richie runs to Fonzie for help. When Mork catches up with him, he freezes everyone, but finds himself unable to freeze Fonzie because of The Fonz's powerful will. Mork challenges Fonzie to a duel: finger vs. thumb. After their duel, The Fonz admits defeat, so Mork decides to take Fonzie back to Ork instead of Richie.

Richie wakes up and realizes he was dreaming. There is a knock on the door, and, much to Richie's dismay, it is a man who looks exactly like Mork, except in regular clothes, asking for directions.

When production on Mork & Mindy began, an extra scene was filmed and added to this episode for subsequent reruns. In the scene, Mork explains to Orson that he decided to let Fonzie go, and was going to travel to the year 1978 to continue his mission. In the pilot episode of Mork & Mindy, Orson tells Mork that he is assigning him to study the planet Earth. Mork remembers that he has been to Earth before to collect a specimen (Fonzie), and adds that he "had to throw it back, though. Too small."

Fonzie and Laverne (of Laverne & Shirley) appeared in the first episode of the show. In this segment, Mork relays to Mindy his trip to 1950s Milwaukee where Fonzie sets up Mork on a date with Laverne.

Mork returned to Happy Days in the episode "Mork Returns", in which Mork tells Richie that he enjoys coming to the 1950s because life is simpler and more "humdrum" than in the 1970s. Fonzie sees Mork and immediately tries to run away, but Mork freezes him and makes him stay. Mork eventually releases Fonzie, but not before Fonzie asks him to reveal two things about the future: "cars and girls". Mork's response is, "In 1979... both are faster." The episode is mostly a retrospective in which clips are shown as Richie and Fonzie try to explain the concepts of love and friendship to Mork.

Mork also appears in the first episode of Out of the Blue, titled "Random's Arrival", as a crossover stunt.

== Home media ==
Paramount Home Entertainment released the complete series on DVD in Region 1, in both individual season sets and a complete series configuration, while the four seasons are available in Regions 2 and 4. The Region 1 DVD of Season 1 was from Paramount alone; subsequent releases in Region 1, as well as international Season 1 releases, have been in conjunction with CBS DVD.

In Australia, only the first three seasons were individually released, followed by a complete series boxset December 17, 2014. In 2020, Via Vision Entertainment obtained the rights to the series, and released a complete series box set December 16, 2020.

| DVD name | Episodes | Release dates | | |
| DVD name | Episodes | Region 1 | Region 2 | Region 4 |
|---|---|---|---|---|
| The Complete First Season | 25 | September 7, 2004 | October 29, 2007 | September 19, 2007 |
| The Second Season | 26 | April 17, 2007 | April 7, 2008 | March 6, 2008 |
| The Third Season | 22 | November 27, 2007 | September 1, 2008 | September 4, 2008 |
| The Fourth Season | 22 | December 9, 2014 | TBA | TBA |
| The Complete Series | 95 | December 9, 2014 | December 15, 2014 | December 17, 2014 December 16, 2020 |

== Primetime Emmy Award nominations ==
For its first season, Mork & Mindy was nominated for two Primetime Emmy Awards: Outstanding Comedy Series and Outstanding Lead Actor in a Comedy Series for Robin Williams. The program lost to Taxi, and Williams lost to Carroll O'Connor for All in the Family.

== Syndication ==
Mork & Mindy was syndicated by Paramount beginning in fall 1982, to low ratings. By 1983, most stations that owned the show rested it in summer, when weaker programming tended to air. Few stations renewed the show a few years later. By 1987, the show aired in only a handful of TV markets. However, the expansion of cable television broadened its reach. Nick at Nite reran the show from March 4, 1991, to November 27, 1995. The show also aired on Fox Family Channel in the late 1990s. From 2008 to 2011, the show aired in marathons on SyFy. It has aired in subsequent years on MeTV, the Hub Network and various other classic television stations airing on various digital subchannels. The show currently airs on Antenna TV Saturdays from 7am to 9am ET and also currently airs on sister network Rewind TV weekdays at 8am ET and currently streams on Pluto TV.

== Filming locations ==
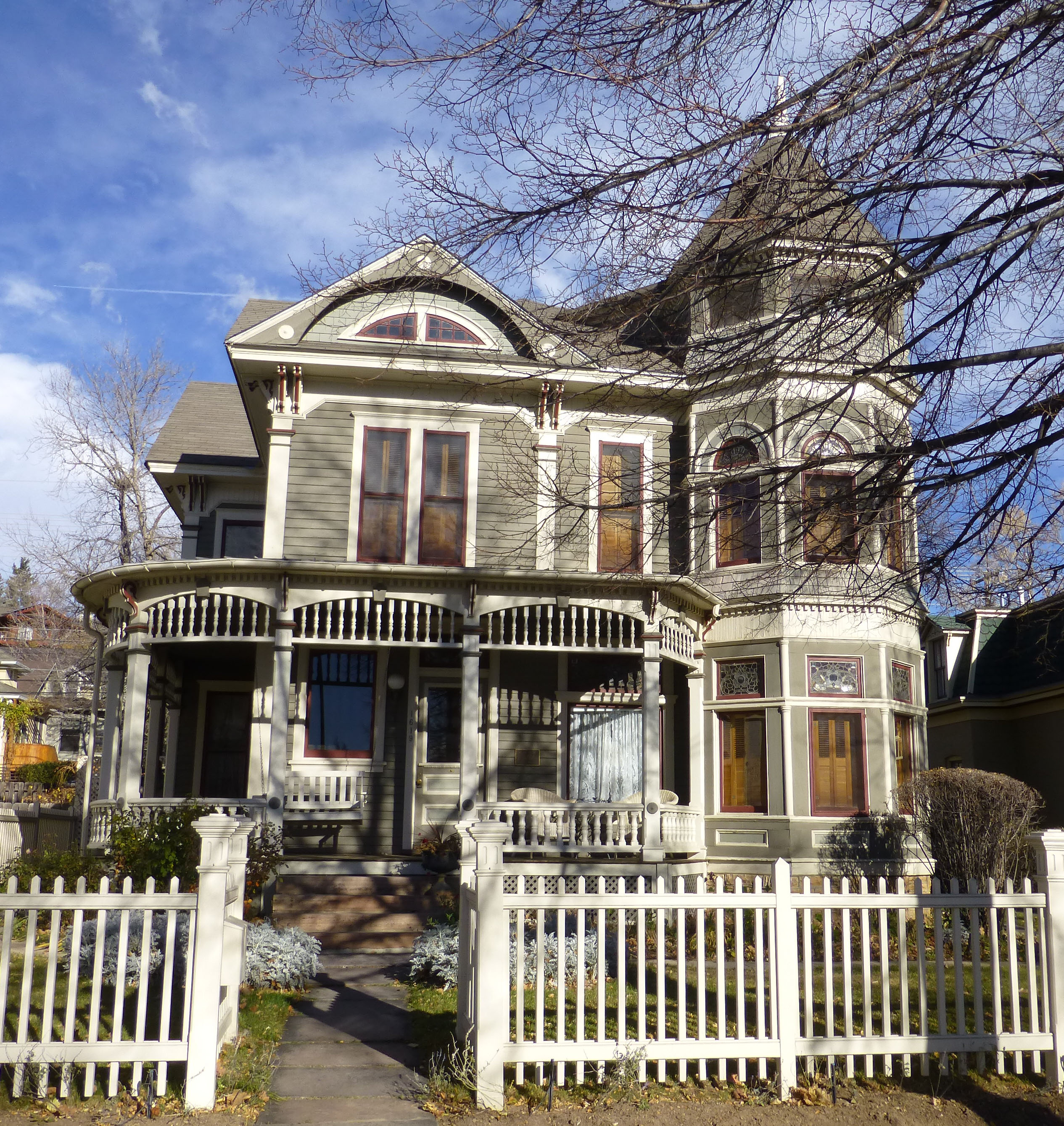
1619 Pine Street, Boulder, Colorado, the location used for the external shots of Mindy's house on Mork & Mindy

In an interview with Garry Marshall June 30, 2006, Pat O'Brien mentioned that Mork & Mindy was filmed on Paramount stage 27, the former studio for his infotainment program The Insider.

The house from the show is located at 1619 Pine Street, just a few blocks from the Pearl Street Mall in Boulder. This was also used in the show as Mindy's actual address in Boulder, as shown in the episode "Mork Goes Public". The same house was used for exterior shots on the series Perfect Strangers, in Episode 21 of Season 5, "This Old House", in which the show's main characters, cousins Larry and Balki, remodel a home for a fix-and-flip with hope of huge profits. It is often mistaken as the house that the cousins moved into with their wives during the final two seasons. In addition, it was used in three episodes of Family Matters as Myra's house. As of June 2024, the house was valued at $3.1 million, with the date of its last sale as 1974, for US$80,000 (equivalent to $494,000 in 2023).

For the show's opening credit sequence, Williams and/or Dawber were filmed at various Boulder locations, notably driving in a convertible Jeep along Boulder Canyon, in front of the Pine Street house, visiting the Pearl Street Mall music store, and the goalpost scene at CU Boulder's Folsom Field.

== Spin-offs and adaptations ==
- In the United Kingdom, a long-running comic strip version was written by Angus P. Allan, illustrated by Bill Titcombe, and printed in children's television magazine, Look-In. Several British-produced annuals were also released that tied in with the series.
- A subsequent animated series titled Mork & Mindy/Laverne & Shirley/Fonz Hour ran on ABC from 1982 to 1983. The Mork & Mindy segments were a prequel with Mindy as a student in high school. The character of Eugene returned in this spin-off voiced by Shavar Ross.
- In 2005, a made-for-television movie titled Behind the Camera: The Unauthorized Story of Mork & Mindy aired on NBC. Chris Diamantopoulos portrayed Robin Williams, Erinn Hayes portrayed Pam Dawber and Daniel Roebuck portrayed producer Garry Marshall. The movie depicts Williams' instant stardom and behind-the-scenes turmoil that the cast and crew would have with the network.
- In 1979, a short-lived Brazilian version of the series appeared as Superbronco. It was produced by Rede Globo and starred comedian Ronald Golias and actress Liza Vieira. Superbronco had only one season and was canceled despite it being among the ten highest TV audience rated shows in 1979.
