= Higgins (surname) =

- Pronunciation: /ˈhɪɡɪnz/
- Language: English, Irish

Origin
- Languages: English, Irish
- Derivation: "Hugh" / "Hig" / "Hick"; Ó hUiginn (Irish)
- Meaning: "son of Hig (Hugh)" / "son of Hick (Richard)" (English) "descendant of Uiginn" (Irish)

Other names
- Variant forms: O'Higgins; Higginson; Huggins

Higgins is a surname found in England and in Ireland, with several origins.

In England, the name originates from:

- the name Hugh
- the name Hig (both the son of Hugh and a diminutive of Hugh)
- Hicke, a diminutive of Richard

each then stemmed with the patronymic termination 'ings', meaning 'belonging to' or 'the son of'.

In Ireland, the name is the Anglicised form of the Gaelic name Ó hUiginn, 'descendant of Uiginn', Uiginn being the Gaelic version of the Old Norse víkingr or Viking. Although there is another variation, which is also an Irish surname: McHiggins.

== In business ==
- Aldus Chapin Higgins (1872–1948), American lawyer and businessman
- Andrew Higgins (1886–1952), founder of Higgins Industries and inventor of the Higgins boat
- John Woodman Higgins (1874–1961), American steel magnate
- Milton Prince Higgins (1842–1912), American industrialist and educator
- Pattillo Higgins (1863–1955), American oil pioneer and businessman, known as the "Prophet of Spindletop"

== In education and science ==
- Aparna Higgins, Indian-American mathematician
- Charles Hayes Higgins (1811–1898), British surgeon and medical author
- Chris Higgins, British geneticist, Vice-Chancellor of Durham University
- Colleen Higgins, plant pathologist in New Zealand
- Donald Higgins (1943–1989), Canadian academic
- E. Tory Higgins (born 1946), American psychologist
- Henry Higgins (botanist) (1814–1893), English botanist
- Julian Higgins, British statistician
- Lionel George Higgins (1891–1985), British obstetrician and lepidopterist
- Michael W. Higgins (born 1948), Canadian academic and writer
- Reynold Higgins (1916–1993), English archaeologist
- Tony Higgins (1944–2004), English university executive
- William Higgins, Irish chemist
- William Victor Higgins, American painter and teacher

== In literature ==
- Aidan Higgins, (1927–2015), Irish writer
- Beda Higgins, British poet and writer
- Fiona Higgins, Irish writer
- George V. Higgins (1939–1999), American attorney and author
- Jack Higgins (1929–2022), pseudonym of British novelist Harry Patterson
- Marguerite Higgins (1920–1966), American journalist and war correspondent
- Michael D. Higgins, (born 1941), Irish poet and president
- Olive Higgins Prouty (1882–1974), born Olive Higgins, American novelist and poet
- Rita Ann Higgins (born 1955), Irish poet and playwright
- Ryan T. Higgins, American children's book author

== In military service ==
- Jack Higgins (RAF officer) (1875–1948), Royal Flying Corps and Royal Air Force commander
- Thomas J. Higgins (1831–1917), American soldier
- William R. Higgins (1945–1990), United States Marine Corps colonel, killed in Lebanon

== In music ==
- Bertie Higgins (born 1944), American singer-songwriter
- Billy Higgins (1936–2001), American jazz drummer
- Brian Higgins (born 1966), British record producer
- Chris Higgins, also known as "X-13", former The Offspring touring member
- Damian Higgins, drum and bass DJ and producer
- Dick Higgins (1938–1998), American composer, poet and Fluxus artist
- Eddie Higgins (1932–2009), American jazz pianist, composer and orchestrator
- Jarad Higgins (1998–2019), American rapper known as Juice WRLD
- Jon B. Higgins (1939–1984), American Carnatic singer
- Missy Higgins, Australian singer
- The Higgins, Canadian band

== In politics ==
- Brian Higgins (born 1959), U.S. Representative from New York
- Clay Higgins, U.S. Representative from Louisiana
- Clement Higgins (1844–1916), British MP from Norfolk
- Frank W. Higgins, Governor of New York
- Geary Higgins, American politician from Virginia
- H. B. Higgins, Australian politician and judge
- Jennifer B. Higgins, American government official
- Jim Higgins (British politician), British socialist
- Joe Higgins (politician), Socialist Party MEP for Dublin; ex-TD
- John Patrick Higgins, former U.S. Representative from Massachusetts
- Joseph T. Higgins (1890–1980), American politician from New York
- Michael D. Higgins (born 1941), Irish politician, poet, broadcaster and sociologist, President of Ireland (2011–2025)
- Patricia Higgins, American politician
- Peg Higgins (born c. 1949), member of the New Hampshire House of Representatives
- Pete B. Higgins (born 1957), member of the Alaska House of Representatives
- Terence Higgins, Baron Higgins (1928–2025), British politician and athlete
- William L. Higgins (1867–1951), U.S. Representative from Connecticut

== In sports ==
- Alex Higgins (1949–2010, nicknamed "Hurricane Higgins"), Northern Irish snooker player
- Andrew Higgins (born 1981), English rugby union footballer
- Andy Higgins (1960–2021, born Andrew Martin Higgins), English football player
- Andy Higgins (born 1993), Australian association football player
- Arthur Higgins (died 1915), rugby league footballer who played in the 1910s
- Chris Higgins (born 1983), American hockey player
- David Higgins (born 1972), Irish golfer
- Dudley Higgins (1920–1999), Irish rugby union player
- Dylan Higgins (born 1991), Zimbabwean cricketer
- Elijah Higgins (born 2000), American football player
- Emma Higgins (footballer) (born 1986), Northern Irish association footballer
- Garin Higgins (born 1968), American football coach
- Harry Higgins (1894–1979), English cricketer
- Henry Higgins (1944–1978), English bullfighter
- Jack Higgins, rugby league footballer who played in the 1940s
- Jay Higgins (born 2002), American football player
- Jayden Higgins (born 2002), American football player
- Jim Higgins (1897–1964), Scottish boxer of the 1910s, 1920s and 1930s
- John Higgins (born 1975), Scottish snooker player
- Johnnie Lee Higgins (born 1983), free agent wide receiver in the NFL
- Luke Higgins (1921–1991), American football player
- Mark Higgins (born 1971), British rally car driver
- Norm Higgins (1936–2026), American marathon runner
- P. J. Higgins (born 1993), American baseball player
- Pinky Higgins (1909–1969), American baseball player, manager, and scout
- Rashard Higgins (born 1994), American football wide receiver
- Ron Higgins (1923–2016), English footballer
- Roy Higgins (1938–2014), Australian jockey
- Ruaidhrí Higgins (born 1984), Northern Irish football player and manager
- Shaun Higgins (born 1988), Australian rules footballer
- Tee Higgins (born 1999), American football wide receiver
- Tyler Higgins (born 1991), American baseball player

== In television and film ==
- Clare Higgins (born 1955), English actress
- John Michael Higgins (born 1963), American actor and comedian
- Kate Higgins (born 1969), American voice actress, singer, and jazz pianist
- Kenneth Higgins (1919–2008), British cinematographer
- Maura Higgins (born 1990), Irish television personality
- Naomi Higgins, Australian writer and comedian
- Paul Higgins (born 1964), British actor
- Steve Higgins (born 1963), American comedian, writer and announcer
- William Higgins (1942–2019), American director of gay pornographic films

== Other professions ==
- Adam Higgins (born 1989) American contemporary painter
- Arch Higgins, New York City Ballet soloist
- Bertha G. Higgins (1872–1944), American suffragist, civil rights activist and clubwoman
- Chester Higgins, Jr., American photographer
- Edward Higgins (1864–1947), British Salvationist, 3rd General of the Salvation Army
- Eoin Higgins, High Court of Northern Ireland jurist
- George Frank Higgins (1850–1884), American painter from Massachusetts
- Godfrey Higgins (1772–1833), English writer on mythology
- Dame Joan Higgins, British academic and health service manager
- Margaret Higgins, Scottish murderer
- Rosalyn Higgins (born 1937), British lawyer and legal scholar, President of the International Court of Justice

== Fictional characters ==
- Bubba Higgins, on the American TV sitcom Mama's Family, played by Allan Kayser
- Henry Higgins, in the play Pygmalion and the derivative musical stage play and later movie, My Fair Lady
- Jonathan Higgins, on the American TV series Magnum, P.I., played by John Hillerman
  - Juliet Higgins, female version of the same character, on the 2018 reboot
- Jake Higgins, anthropologist and protagonist of the 2019 survival video game Green Hell

== See also ==
- General Higgins (disambiguation)
- Justice Higgins (disambiguation)
- Senator Higgins (disambiguation)
- O'Higgins (disambiguation)
- Higginson (disambiguation)
- Huggins (disambiguation)
