= Higginson =

Higginson or Higgenson may refer to:

== Surnames ==
- Andrew Higginson (businessman) (born 1957), British businessman
- Andrew Higginson (snooker player) (born 1977), English professional snooker player
- Bobby Higginson (born 1970), American professional baseball player
- Francis Higginson (1588–1630), colonial American Puritan and publisher
- Francis J. Higginson (1843–1931), American admiral
- Gary Higginson (born 1952), British composer
- George Higginson (1826–1927), British general and Crimean War hero
- Harry Pasley Higginson (1838–1900), British and New Zealand civil engineer
- Henry Lee Higginson (1834–1919), American businessman and philanthropist; founder of the Boston Symphony Orchestra
- Huw Higginson (born 1964), British actor
- James Higginson (cricketer) (1885–1940), English cricketer
- Jill Higginson, American biomechanical engineer
- John Higginson (fellow) (1561-1622), one of the founding fathers of Jesus College, Oxford
- John Higginson (minister) (1616-1708), American Minister
- Nathaniel Higginson (1652-1708), first mayor of Madras
- Stephen Higginson (Continental Congress) (1743–1828), American merchant and shipmaster from Boston; delegate to the Continental Congress
- Stephen A. Higginson (born 1961), American federal judge
- Stephanie Higginson, Canadian politician
- Teresa Helena Higginson (1844–1905), English Roman Catholic mystic
- Thomas Higginson (soldier) (1794–1884), Canadian soldier, civic official and politician
- Thomas Higginson (Canadian politician) (born 1810), Canadian political figure
- Thomas Wentworth Higginson (1823–1911), American author, abolitionist, and soldier
- Timothy Higginson, real name of Tim Wylton (born 1940), Welsh actor
- Torri Higginson (born 1969), Canadian actress
- William J. Higginson (1938–2008), American poet, translator and author

== Placenames ==
- Higginson, Arkansas, USA
- Higginson Island, Northern Territory, Australia

== Other ==
- Lee, Higginson & Co., American Boston-based investment bank
- Higginson Highway, a road in eThekwini, South Africa

== See also ==
- Higgins (disambiguation)
