= Huggins (surname) =

Huggins is a surname of English origin. Notable people with the surname include:

- Albert Huggins (born 1997), American football player
- Bob Huggins (born 1953), American college basketball coach
- Charles Brenton Huggins (1901–1997), Canadian-born American physician, physiologist, and cancer researcher
- Charlie Huggins (born 1947), member of the Alaska Senate
- Colin Huggins (born 1978), American classical pianist and busker
- Derek Huggins (1940–2021), gallerist and founding director of the National Arts Council of Zimbabwe
- Edie Huggins (1935–2008), American television reporter, journalist and broadcaster
- Godfrey Huggins, 1st Viscount Malvern (1883–1971), Rhodesian politician
- Henry Charles Huggins (1891–1977), English naturalist
- Peter Jeremy William Huggins, known as Jeremy Brett (1933–1995), English actor
- Jack Huggins (1886–1915), English footballer
- John Huggins (1945–1969), American Black Panther Party political activist
- Johnny Huggins (born 1976), American football player
- Margaret Lindsay Huggins (1848–1915), British astronomer; pioneer in the field of spectroscopy
- Maurice Loyal Huggins (1897–1981), American scientist and chemist
- Miller Huggins (1879–1929), American professional baseball player and manager
- Roy Huggins (1914–2002), American novelist, screenwriter, and television producer
- Waymond C. Huggins (1927–2016), American politician
- William Huggins (1820–1884), English animal artist
- William Huggins (1824–1910), British astronomer

== See also ==
- Higgins (surname)
