= James Higginson =

James Higginson may refer to:

- James Higginson (filmmaker), American filmmaker, fine artist, and photographer
- James Higginson (cricketer), English cricketer
- Sir James Macaulay Higginson, Anglo-Irish colonial administrator
- James J. Higginson, American stockbroker and soldier
