= Farn =

Farn may refer to:

== People ==
- Farn-Sasan (died 226), last king of the Indo-Parthian Kingdom
- Albert Brydges Farn (1841–1921), British entomologist
- Farn Carpmael (1908–1988), English rower
- Michael Farn (born 1988), English ice hockey player

== Other ==
- Farne Islands, England
- Fuerzas Armadas de la Resistencia Nacional, Salvadoran organisation
