= Thomas Higginson =

Thomas Higginson may refer to:

- Thomas Wentworth Higginson (1823–1911), American author, abolitionist, and soldier
- Thomas Higginson (Canadian politician) (1810–1896), Canadian political figure
- Thomas Higginson (soldier) (1794–1884), Canadian soldier, civic official and politician
- Tom Higgenson of the band Plain White Ts
