= Huggins =

Huggins may refer to:

== People ==
- Huggins (surname), American surname

== Fictional characters ==
- Henry Huggins, character in a series of juvenile fiction novels by Beverly Cleary

== Places ==
- Huggins, Missouri, USA
- Huggins (lunar crater)
- Huggins (Martian crater)

== Science ==
- Flory–Huggins solution theory, mathematical model of the thermodynamics of polymer solutions

== See also ==
- Higgins (disambiguation)
