= Longuet-Higgins =

Longuet-Higgins, a double-barrelled name, may refer to:

- H. Christopher Longuet-Higgins (1923–2004), theoretical chemist and a cognitive scientist, elder brother to Michael
- Michael S. Longuet-Higgins (1925–2016), mathematician and oceanographer, younger brother to Christopher

== See also ==
- Longuet
- Higgins (surname)
