= List of people from Huntington Beach, California =

This is a list of notable people from Huntington Beach, California.

== Actors ==
- Willie Aames, attended Edison High School
- Eva Angelina, adult film actress
- Ethan Embry, actor
- Lauren German, actress of NBC TV series Chicago Fire
- Amy Grabow, grew up in Huntington Beach; attended the Academy for the Performing Arts
- Jenna Jameson, pornographic actress; resided in Huntington Harbour with Tito Ortiz
- Jack Kelly, most noted for the role of Bart Maverick on the Maverick TV series; during the 1980s and early 1990s, served as city councilman and mayor in Huntington Beach
- Jason Lee, actor, who portrays the title character in TV series My Name is Earl; grew up in Huntington Beach and attended Ocean View High School
- Dennis Woodruff, Los Angeles based actor, producer, and director

== Athletes ==
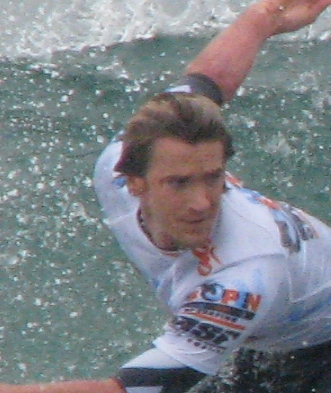
Brett Simpson

- Mixed martial artists Tank Abbott, James Irvin, Kimo Leopoldo, and Tito "The Huntington Beach Bad Boy" Ortiz
- Pro skateboarders Mark Appleyard, Christian Hosoi, Nyjah Huston, Geoff Rowley, Arto Saari, Brian Sumner, Ed Templeton, and Tosh Townend
- Collin Balester, baseball player, attended Huntington Beach High School
- Eric Biefeld, soccer player
- Former NHL hockey player John Blue
- Hank Conger, baseball player, attended Huntington Beach High School
- Jessie Godderz, professional bodybuilder with the World Natural Body Building Federation, contestant on Big Brother 10 and Big Brother 11, and professional wrestler signed to Impact Wrestling
- Julio César González, boxer, 1996 Olympic athlete representing Mexico, WBO light-heavyweight champion 2003, attended Edison High
- Tony Gonzalez, Pro Football Hall of Fame tight end attended Huntington Beach High School
- Bill Green, former U.S. and NCAA record holder in Track and Field, 5th place in the hammer throw at the 1984 Olympic Games
- Kyle Higashioka, Major League Baseball catcher
- Ian Kennedy, San Diego Padres pitcher, was born in Huntington Beach
- Jeff Kent, retired baseball player and recipient of baseball's 2000 National League MVP award, was raised in Huntington Beach and attended Edison High School.
- Orion Kerkering, Philadelphia Phillies pitcher
- Professional soccer player Sacha Kljestan
- Jürgen Klinsmann, soccer player, coach of the Germany national football team and former coach of the United States men's national soccer team; moved with his family in 2008 to Munich, Germany to become the coach of FC Bayern Munich; currently resides in Newport Beach
- Chris Kluwe, football punter
- Iris Kyle, 10-time overall Ms. Olympia professional bodybuilder
- Scott Lipsky, professional tennis player
- Abner Mares, boxer
- David Martin, professional tennis player
- Paul McBeth, professional disc golfer and six-time PDGA world champion
- Peter Mel, surfer
- Jenna Nighswonger, professional soccer player currently for Arsenal and 2024 Paris Olympics gold medalist
- Henry Owens, baseball player
- Nick Pratto, baseball player, first-round selection in 2017 MLB draft
- Joe Seanoa (ring name Samoa Joe), professional wrestler signed to AEW/ROH
- Tom Shields, swimmer, 2009 graduate of Edison High School, gold medalist in 400 medley relay for U.S. at 2015 World Swimming Championships in Kazan, Russia
- Brett Simpson, surfer
- Zane Smith, NASCAR Cup Series driver
- Peter "PT" Townend, surfer
- Joan Weston, star of Roller Derby
- Bob Wolcott, former Seattle Mariners pitcher, was born in Huntington Beach

== Musicians ==
- Members of the rock/metal band Avenged Sevenfold grew up and reside here including lead guitarist Synyster Gates . Original drummer and founding member, The Rev, was buried here.
- Beau Bokan, singer for metal band blessthefall, was born in Huntington Beach.
- Buckethead, guitarist and multi-instrumentalist, was born in Huntington Beach.
- Matt Costa, folk pop singer, was born in Huntington Beach.
- The Dirty Heads, a reggae band, formed in Huntington Beach.
- The alternative/pop band Emblem3 moved to Huntington Beach to pursue their musical career.
- Ayesha Erotica, singer-songwriter and rapper
- (Hed) P.E., punk rock/hip hop group, was formed in Huntington Beach.
- hellogoodbye was formed in Huntington Beach in 2001.
- Dexter Holland from The Offspring lived in Huntington Beach.
- Christian Jacobs, MC Bat Commander of The Aquabats
- Mike Martt (died 2023), singer-songwriter and member of Tex & the Horseheads and Thelonious Monster
- Joe and Luke McGarry of the indie band Pop Noir were born in Manchester, England, but grew up in Huntington Beach.
- Alien Ant Farm lead singer Dryden Mitchell
- The ska punk rock band Reel Big Fish formed here in 1992.
- David Silveria, formerly from the rock band Korn
- The Suburban Legends are natives of Huntington Beach.
- Dean Torrence, from the 1960s pop group Jan and Dean, who co-wrote "Surf City" (#1 in 1963), said that Huntington Beach embodies the song's spirit of freedom and California fun.
- Mad Tsai, singer-songwriter
- The Vandals, punk rock band formed in Huntington Beach
- Kevin "Noodles" Wasserman from The Offspring lives in Huntington Beach
- Nick Waterhouse grew up in Huntington Beach, played little league at Seaview and attended Edison High School.
- Doug Webb, saxophonist
- Scott Weiland of Stone Temple Pilots and Velvet Revolver attended Edison High School.
- Paul Williams, composer, singer, songwriter and actor
- Brett Young, country singer who was raised in Huntington Beach.
- The Ziggens, surf rock band formed in Huntington Beach

== Other ==
- Bob Baffert, horse owner and trainer
- Pete Conrad, astronaut
- Violet Cowden, aviator and member of the Women Airforce Service Pilots during World War II
- Lani Forbes, young adult writer
- Adam Higgins (born 1989), contemporary painter
- Donald Lu, diplomat
- Kenneth True Norris Jr., industrialist and philanthropist
- Robert Peters, UCI scholar and poet
- Brent Rivera, social media personality
- Jasmine Tookes, model for Victoria's Secret
