= Attorney General Higgins =

Attorney General Higgins may refer to:

- H. B. Higgins (1851–1929), Attorney-General of Australia
- William J. Higgins (1880–1943), Attorney-General of the Dominion of Newfoundland

== See also ==
- General Higgins (disambiguation)
