= Pee-wee's Playhouse =

American television series (1986–1990)

- Genre: Children's television series Surreal comedy Edutainment
- Created by: Paul Reubens
- Directed by: Wayne Orr; John Paragon
- Presented by: Pee-wee Herman
- Starring: Paul Reubens; Laurence Fishburne; Lynne Marie Stewart; Phil Hartman; S. Epatha Merkerson; John Paragon
- Theme music composer: George McGrath; Mark Mothersbaugh; Paul Reubens
- Composers: Mark Mothersbaugh (eps 1, 3, 5–7, 15, 17, 30, 34-35, 38–40, 45); Todd Rundgren (eps 2, 8, 11, 13); Mitch Froom (ep 4); Danny Elfman (eps 9, 10); Jay Cotton (eps 12, 33); The Residents (eps 14, 22, 23, 25, 38); Glenn A. Jordan (eps 16, 20); Cliff Martinez (ep 18); Jeff Baxter (ep 19); Stanley Clarke (ep 21); Dweezil Zappa and Scott Thunes (eps 24, 26, 27, 44); Van Dyke Parks (Christmas special); John Paragon (Christmas special theme music); Mark Snow (eps 28, 32, 36, 43); Tom Snow (eps 29, 42); Bruce Roberts (Christmas special theme music, eps 31, 37); Jonathan Sheffer (eps 31, 37); Ron Grant (ep 41)
- Countries of origin: United States; United Kingdom
- Original language: English
- No. of seasons: 5
- No. of episodes: 45 (plus a Christmas special) (list of episodes)

Production
- Producers: Paul Reubens; Richard Abramson
- Production locations: 480 Broadway, New York City (1986-87); Hollywood Center Studios, Los Angeles, California (1987–1989); The Culver Studios, Los Angeles, California (1989–1991)
- Camera setup: Film (principal photography); Videotape (post-production); Single-camera
- Running time: 23–24 minutes
- Production companies: Pee-wee Pictures (entire run); Broadcast Arts (1986-1987); Binder Entertainment (1987–1988); BRB Productions (1987-1989; eps 17-18, eps 24-25 and Christmas Special); Grosso-Jacobson Productions (1989–1991)

Original release
- Network: CBS
- Release: September 13, 1986 – November 17, 1990

Related
- The Pee-wee Herman Show

Pee-wee's Playhouse is an American children's comedy television series starring Paul Reubens as the childlike Pee-wee Herman that ran from 1986 to 1990 on Saturday mornings on CBS, and airing in reruns until July 1991. The show was developed from Reubens's popular stage show and the TV special The Pee-wee Herman Show, produced for HBO, which was similar in style but featured much more adult humor.

In 2004 and 2007, Pee-wee's Playhouse was ranked No. 10 and No. 12 on TV Guide's Top Cult Shows Ever, respectively. It was also named to Time's list of the 100 Best TV Shows in 2007.

== Development ==
The Pee-wee Herman character was developed by Reubens into a live stage show titled The Pee-wee Herman Show in 1980. It features many characters that would go on to appear in Playhouse, including Captain Carl, Jambi the Genie, Turrlette the Toilet, Miss Yvonne, Pterri the Pterodactyl, and Clocky. While enjoying continuous popularity with the show, Reubens teamed with young director Tim Burton in 1985 to make the comedy film Pee-wee's Big Adventure. It became one of the year's surprise hits, costing a relatively modest $7 million to make but taking in $40 million at the box office.

After seeing the success of Pee-wee's Big Adventure, the CBS network approached Reubens with an ill-received cartoon series proposal. In 1986, CBS agreed to sign Reubens to act, produce, and direct his own live-action Saturday morning children's program, Pee-wee's Playhouse, with a budget of US$325,000 per episode (comparable to that of a half-hour prime-time sitcom), and full creative control, although CBS did request a few minor changes over the years.

Reubens assembled a supporting troupe that included ex-Groundlings and cast members from The Pee-wee Herman Show, including Phil Hartman, John Paragon, Lynne Marie Stewart, Laurence Fishburne, and S. Epatha Merkerson. Production began in New York City in the summer of 1986 in a converted loft on Broadway, which one of the show's writers, George McGrath, described as a "sweatshop". Reubens moved the production to Los Angeles for season 2 in 1987, resulting in a new set and a more relaxed work atmosphere.

The creative design of the show was concocted by a troupe of artists including Wayne White, Gary Panter, Craig Bartlett, Nick Park, Richard Goleszowski, Gregory Harrison, Ric Heitzman, and Phil Trumbo. The first day of production, right as Panter began reading the scripts to find out where everything would be situated, set workers hurriedly asked him, "Where's the plans? All the carpenters are standing here ready to build everything." Panter responded, "You just have to give us 15 minutes to design this thing!" When asked about the styles that went into the set design, Panter said, "This was like the hippie dream .... It was a show made by artists .... We put art history all over the show. It's really like .... I think Mike Kelley said, and it's right, that it's kind of like the Googie style – it's like those LA types of coffee shops and stuff but kind of psychedelic, over-the-top." Several artistic filmmaking techniques are featured on the program including chroma key, stop-motion animation, and clay animation.

Pee-Wee's Playhouse was designed as an educational yet entertaining and artistic show for children. Its conception was greatly influenced by shows Reubens had watched as a child, like The Rocky and Bullwinkle Show, The Mickey Mouse Club, Captain Kangaroo, and Howdy Doody. The show quickly acquired a dual audience of kids and adults. This proved especially important to CBS in the late 1980s when people meters were introduced; the vice president of rival network ABC, which had targeted its cartoons toward preschoolers, observed that ABC "got killed" in the ratings by Pee-Wee's Playhouse because ABC's younger audience could not operate the people meters. In 1988, ABC would shift its programming to shows that would draw both children and adults, helping to begin that network's recovery.

Reubens, always trying to make Pee-wee a positive role model, sought to make a significantly moral show that would teach children the ethics of reciprocity. Reubens believed that children liked the Playhouse because it was fast-paced, colorful, and "never talked down to them", while parents liked the Playhouse because it reminded them of the past.

== Production ==
At the start of season 2, the show moved from its New York City warehouse studio to facilities at the Hollywood Center Studios, creating changes in personnel and a change to the set that allowed the show to take advantage of the additional space. The show changed production facilities again in 1989 during its fourth season, this time at the Culver Studios, also in Los Angeles.

== Format ==
The premise of the show is that host Pee-wee Herman plays in the fantastic Playhouse in Puppetland. The house is filled with toys, gadgets, talking furniture, and appliances (such as Magic Screen and Chairry), puppet characters (such as Conky the Robot and Pterri the baby Pteranodon), and Jambi (John Paragon), a disembodied genie's head who lives in a jeweled box. The Playhouse is visited by a regular cast of human characters, including Miss Yvonne (Lynne Marie Stewart), Reba the Mail Lady (S. Epatha Merkerson), Captain Carl (Phil Hartman), Cowboy Curtis (Laurence Fishburne), and a group of children called The Playhouse Gang.

Although primarily a live-action comedy, each episode includes segments featuring puppetry, video animation, and prepared sequences using Chroma key and stock footage (for example when Pee-wee jumps into the Magic Screen), as well as inserted clay animation sequences (some made by Aardman Animations in The UK, who would later make Wallace & Gromit) and excerpts from cartoons from the Golden Age of American animation and in the public domain, usually presented by the character "The King of Cartoons". Each episode features specially written soundtrack music by rock and pop musicians such as Mark Mothersbaugh (Devo), Todd Rundgren, Mitchell Froom, and The Residents. The show's theme song performance is credited to "Ellen Shaw", though in her autobiography, Cyndi Lauper admits to being the actual singer. "I told him I would (sing it), but I couldn't have it under my name because I was going to put out 'True Colors', which had a serious tone. In our superficial world, people couldn't accept both at the same time. So I sang the theme song using the pseudonym Ellen Shaw. And then Paul sent me back a tape that was so hilariously funny of me singing the theme with him in between saying, 'Oh no! My career is ruined, oh no!' Hes a nut, I love him." Despite being aimed at children, the show also included some adult humor, like the flirty Miss Yvonne.

The show has many recurring gags, themes, and devices. Each episode usually contained a running gag particular to that episode, or a specific event or dilemma that sends Pee-wee into an emotional frenzy. At the beginning of each episode, viewers are told the day's "secret word" (often issued by Conky the Robot) and are instructed to "scream real loud" every time a character says the word.

1989 summer reruns usually edited these episodes (6 in Season One, 2 in Season Two) for a new look. Edits usually included cartoon replacements, segment intros being refilmed, and alternate angles for certain shots.

CBS and Reubens mutually agreed to end the show at the end of the 1990–91 season after five seasons and 45 episodes. The last original episode aired on November 17, 1990. In July 1991, Reubens was arrested for exposing himself in a Sarasota, Florida, adult movie theater, prompting CBS to immediately stop airing its Playhouse re-runs, which were originally intended to air until September 1991. The show was replaced by reruns of The Adventures of Raggedy Ann and Andy.

== Soundtracks ==
The music for the show was provided by a diverse set of musicians, including Mark Mothersbaugh, The Residents, Todd Rundgren, Danny Elfman (who provided the score for both of the Pee-wee movies), Mitchell Froom, Van Dyke Parks, George S. Clinton, and Dweezil Zappa with Scott Thunes (spelled 'Tunis' in the credits).

Mothersbaugh, who later went on to become a fixture in composing music for children's shows like Rugrats, joined the show while on hiatus from recording with Devo. Said Mothersbaugh in 2006:

Paul Reubens asked me to do Pee-wee's Playhouse, and I had some time, so I was like, yeah, let's do it. Pee-wee's Playhouse was really chaotic. They'd send me the tape from New York on Tuesday. I'd watch it Tuesday night; Wednesday I'd write the music. Thursday I'd record the music, it'd go out Thursday night to them, they'd have Friday to cut it into the picture, and then Saturday we'd watch it on TV. And it was like really fast, and instead of writing an album once a year I was writing an album's worth of music once a week, and it was really exciting. It was a new experience and it was a different creative process.

The opening prelude theme is an interpolation of Martin Denny's cover of Les Baxter's "Quiet Village" with squawks and jungle sounds. The theme song, which originally followed the prelude, was performed by Cyndi Lauper (credited as "Ellen Shaw"), imitating Betty Boop. For the final two seasons in, a new version of the prelude theme was recorded, and the opening theme was slightly edited.

== Cast and crew ==
Many now-well-known TV and film actors appeared on the show, including Sandra Bernhard, Laurence Fishburne, Phil Hartman, Natasha Lyonne, S. Epatha Merkerson, Jimmy Smits, and Lynne Stewart. Musician and filmmaker Rob Zombie was a production assistant, and future filmmaker John Singleton was a security guard and production assistant.

The Christmas special episode, "Pee-wee's Playhouse Christmas Special", aired between seasons 2 and 3 and included the regular cast, along with appearances by Annette Funicello, Frankie Avalon, Magic Johnson, Dinah Shore, Joan Rivers, Zsa Zsa Gabor, Oprah Winfrey, Whoopi Goldberg, Little Richard, Cher, Charo, k.d. lang, the Del Rubio triplets, and Grace Jones.

=== Humans ===
Character	Played by	Description
Pee-wee Herman	Paul Reubens	The childlike "host". Pee-wee is portrayed as an impatient and fun-loving man with dainty mannerisms and quirky facial expressions. He is typically cheerful and flamboyant, with occasional childish temper tantrums.
Cowboy Curtis	Laurence Fishburne	A "cowboy" in the 1950s pop culture sense with a Jheri curl mullet.
Captain Carl	Phil Hartman	A gritty, unshaven sea captain with a gruff voice, but a somewhat shy demeanor, he shows Pee-wee interesting things from the ocean. His tolerance for Pee-wee's antics is often tested whenever he stopped by. Captain Carl is more adult-oriented in the HBO special and Miss Yvonne appears to have deep feelings for him. The character only featured in season one.
Miss Yvonne	Lynne Marie Stewart	A woman obsessed with beauty and cosmetics, who often flirts with Pee-wee and many of the other male characters on the show. Miss Yvonne is given the title "the most beautiful woman in Puppetland" by the puppet characters (especially by Mr. Window, who would usually introduce her). She wears a large brown bouffant-style wig that she doesn't like getting wet, gaudy dresses, and heels.
Reba the Mail Lady	S. Epatha Merkerson	A mail carrier who is often confused by the nature of the playhouse.
The King of Cartoons	Gilbert Lewis (first season); William H. Marshall (subsequent seasons)	A king who rules Cartoonland who shows a brief cartoon clip during his segment with his catch phrase "Let the cartoon begin!" In the first season, the King of Cartoons would show the cartoon on his projector. In the second season, he would show the cartoon on Pee-wee's television which he got Pee-wee as a housewarming gift following the remodeling of the Playhouse.
Tito	Roland Rodriguez	The playhouse lifeguard, he usually enters the house during a group activity. The character only featured in season one.
Ricardo	Vic Trevino	A soccer star with an apparent medical background; featured from season two onwards.
Mrs. Steve	Shirley Stoler	A frequent visitor to the playhouse during the first season, she enjoyed eating and "snooping around" when Pee-wee was not seen. The character only featured in season one.
Mrs. Rene	Suzanne Kent	A Jewish neighbor of Pee-wee's who served as a replacement for Mrs. Steve after the first season. She is the polar opposite of Mrs. Steve, being much more tolerant and fun-loving.
Dixie	Johann Carlo	A no-nonsense taxi driver, she introduces the King of Cartoons in the first season by playing her trumpet. The character was dropped after season one and the King's introduction is done by the three flowers.
The Playhouse Gang (first version)	Opal: Natasha Lyonne; Elvis: Shaun Weiss; Cher: Diane Yang	Three children who interact with Pee-wee during the first season and resembled hippies.
The Playhouse Gang (second version)	Fabian: Vaughn Tyree Jelks; Li'l Punkin: Alisan Porter; Rapunzel: Stephanie Walski	A second group of three children who interact with Pee-wee in two episodes of the second season.
Roosevelt	An unnamed dog actor	Pee-wee's dog. Pee-wee can understand what he says. One of its trainers was Paul's real-life younger brother Luke Rubenfeld.

=== Puppet/animated and object characters ===
A replica of Chairry in a cinema in Tampa, Florida

Character	Actor/puppeteer (if applicable)	Description
Jambi	John Paragon	A blue-faced (later green) genie who lives as a disembodied head in a jeweled box, he usually appears once per show to grant a wish, often with unexpected results. Before granting said wish, he makes the group and audience chant "Mecca lecca hi, mecca hiney ho."
Chairry	Alison Mork	A bluish-green armchair with eyes on the chair back, a mouth between the seat cushions, and armrests that flap around, she occasionally hugs Pee-wee when he sits on her.
Magic Screen	Alison Mork	A screen on wheels that slightly resembles an Etch-A-Sketch, she shows films and Pee-wee would frequently jump into the screen to interact with a fantasy land inside that would also include Pee-wee connecting the dots there.
Pterri	John Paragon (seasons 1, 3–5); George McGrath (season 2)	A green pteranodon and one of Pee-wee's closest friends, he usually acts like a sensitive young child.
Mr. Window	Ric Heitzman	The window to the left of the playhouse door when inside the playhouse, he has googly eyes and talks by moving his yellow window pane up and down. His role on the show is to introduce other characters.
Clockey	Kevin Carlson	A yellow and red clock shaped like a map of the United States, he often introduces cartoons.
Conky 2000	Gregory Harrison (season 1); Kevin Carlson (subsequent seasons)	The playhouse robot, who gives Pee-wee the "secret word" on a strip of paper each week and serves as a computer element. He spoke with a stutter, and is made from various parts of old electronics, including old camera attachments for eyes, a boombox for a chest, a phonograph for a torso, and a cash register for the head.
Globey	George McGrath	A spinning globe with a pair of arms at the base and a large face in the middle of the Atlantic Ocean, Globey speaks with a French accent and often helps Pee-wee out with geography, language, astronomy, or history questions.
Puppet Band	Dirty Dog: Wayne White; Cool Cat: Ric Heitzman; Chicky Baby: Alison Mork	Three animal puppets who comprise a 1950s-style jazz combo, they live in a corridor of the Playhouse resembling a street alley. It consists of Dirty Dog on guitar, Cool Cat on bongos, and Chicky Baby on vocals. They normally speak in rhyme, parodying Beat Generation poetry.
Mr. Kite	Wayne White	A pink kite, he occasionally appears in one of the playhouse windows for weather reports and occasional visitor announcements.
Randy	Wayne White	A red-headed marionette who serves as the playhouse bully, usually making life miserable for everyone. Sometimes, Pee-wee would have to set him straight as seen when Randy tried cigarettes and once tried to hijack the show while Pee-wee was out getting groceries.
Billy Baloney	Paul Reubens	A ventriloquist dummy who slightly resembles Randy in appearance (but with blond hair) which Pee-wee himself operates on occasion.
Dog Chair	George McGrath	A white chaise longue, which is similar to Chairry but resembling the face of a dog.
The Ants		Occasionally, Pee-wee would check on the ant farm; a short close-up animated sequence shows the ants engaged in some human activity.
The Dinosaur Family	Red Dinosaur: George McGrath; Light Blue Dinosaur: Alison Mork; Blue Dinosaur: Ric Heitzman; Pink Dinosaur: Kevin Carlson	A den of miniature clay-animation anthropomorphic dinosaurs, they live in a mouse hole in the playhouse. The Red Dinosaur resembles an anthropomorphic Triceratops, the Light Blue Dinosaur resembles a Styracosaurus, and the Blue and Pink Dinosaurs have Pteranodon-like heads.
Food		The contents of Pee-wee's refrigerator, these clay-animation food items dance and juggle. One episode had them assisting Ricardo in telling Pee-wee and the viewers about the different food groups. In two episodes, they have been shown watching something in their movie theater when Pee-wee looks for something inside the refrigerator which often causes a mustached egg roll to turn around and quote "Hey, what are you doing?!" The other food items then start to clamor at him as Pee-wee obtains the item and shuts the door.
Flowers	Ric Heitzman; George McGrath; Wayne White	These three flowers live in a flowerbed in a window on the right side of the playhouse door. After Dixie was retired from the show after season 1, they took over introducing the King of Cartoons for the rest of the series.
Fish	Purple Fish: Ric Heitzman; Yellow Fish: George McGrath	Two fish who live in the playhouse aquarium.
Penny	Anna Seidman	A clay animation short featuring a blonde girl with pennies for eyes, who described some situations in her life and daily activities. She was created by Craig Bartlett, who would later create Nickelodeon's Hey Arnold!
Knucklehead	Gregory Harrison (season 1); Kevin Carlson (season 2)	A large image of a side view of a fist, with "googly eyes" and lipstick who tells bad knock-knock jokes.
Cowntess	George McGrath	A life-sized, talking Holstein cattle that speaks in an elegant accent.
Salesman	Ric Heitzman	A full-bodied cartoonish salesman, dressed in a tacky suit, he rings the doorbell and asserts, "I'm going door-to-door to make you this incredible offer!" A scary music cue would play as Pee-wee would frantically shut the door, exclaiming, "Salesman!" in a frightened tone. In the salesman's final appearance in the episode "Party", Pee-wee actually asked him what the incredible offer was and got free foil from him which Pee-wee used to add to his foil ball.
Floory	Kevin Carlson	A section of the playhouse floor that stands up and talks. He was discovered by Pee-wee and his friends following the playhouse remodeling in season 2. To continue interacting with Floory, Pee-wee moved the teepee that originally covered him to another spot in the playhouse.
Chandelier	Alison Mork	A talking chandelier that has a French accent.
Magic Glasses	Wayne White	A pair of glasses attached to a hat that has a monkey's head and arms on them. Pee-wee puts them on him and sees various things through them. While the Magic Glasses often says "Put me on Pee-wee", it has occasionally said other things as seen in "Party" when it suggested that Pee-wee invites Reba to his party.
Exercise Belt	Ric Heitzman	A vintage vibrating belt machine.
Toys		Pee-wee's strange toys which he keeps in a smiley face-shaped window, with movable shelves inside. By season 2, the toys were moved to another part of the Playhouse during the remodeling and Clocky was put in their original place. They never made another appearance, until the Christmas special.
El Hombre	Tito Larriva	An un-subtitled Spanish-language cartoon about a superhero who stops crime, thwarts strangers, saves people's lives and rights any other wrongs. Six different clay animation shorts are featured on this show.

== Reception ==
=== Critical reception ===
As soon as it first aired, Pee-wee's Playhouse fascinated media theorists and commentators, many of whom championed the show as a postmodernist hodgepodge of characters and situations that appeared to thumb its nose at the racist and sexist presumptions of dominant culture. For example, Pee-wee's friends, both human and not, were of diverse cultural and racial origins. In a review of the first season for The New York Times, John J. O'Connor called it "undoubtedly this season's most imaginative and disarming new series". O'Connor lauded the show's mixed-media format and commented that the Saturday morning kids' programming of "low-cost, dreary and occasionally questionable cartoons will never be the same" after Pee-wee. Of Pee-wee, O'Connor said, "He whips up a tightly contained world in which anything is possible as long as it doesn't hurt anyone", and "He's sweetly looney and unpredictable, gentle yet always tip-toeing on the edge of devastating absurdity. He is a one-man force battling the plague of boredom that has settled on Saturday-morning programming for children." The show's subversiveness and its "apparent outbreak of playful queerness during the politically reactionary Reagan-Bush/Moral Majority years was a key factor of many adults' enjoyment of the show". Captain Kangaroo's Bob Keeshan hailed the show's "awesome production values", adding, "with the possible exception of the Muppets, you can't find such creativity anywhere on TV."

"I'm just trying to illustrate that it's okay to be different — not that it's good, not that it's bad, but that it's all right. I'm trying to tell kids to have a good time and to encourage them to be creative and to question things," Reubens told an interviewer in Rolling Stone.

In 2007, Pee-wee's Playhouse was named to Time magazine's list of the 100 Best TV Shows.

On November 1, 2011, in commemoration of the 25th anniversary of the show, a book by Caseen Gaines called Inside Pee-wee's Playhouse: The Untold, Unauthorized, and Unpredictable Story of a Pop Phenomenon, was released by ECW Press.

In the wake of Reubens' death from cancer in 2023, John Jurgensen of The Wall Street Journal wrote: "Pee-wee Herman wasn't originally meant for kids. So when Paul Reubens did make a Saturday-morning TV show for them, his signature character came in a package shaped by underground art, punk rock and improv comedy. As MTV was to cable and The Simpsons would soon be to prime-time, Pee-wee's Playhouse was a disrupter of the TV domain for kids. The show's psychedelic absurdism also attracted an audience of teens, college students and savvy parents of the show's target viewers. With his wild remix of the kids' shows that he grew up with as a baby boomer, Reubens put a stamp on Generation X."

=== Awards and nominations ===
- 14th Daytime Emmy Awards – 1987
  - Outstanding Makeup – Sharon Ilson (won)
  - Outstanding Hairstyling – Sally Hershberger and Eric Gregg (won)
  - Outstanding Art Direction/Set Decoration/Scenic Design – Gary Panter, Sydney J. Bartholomew Jr., Nancy Deren, Wayne White, and Ric Heitzman (won)
  - Outstanding Film Sound Mixing – Rolf Pardula and Ken Hahn
  - Outstanding Videotape Editing – Paul Dougherty, Doug Jines, Joe Castellano, Les Kaye, and Howard Silver
  - Outstanding Graphics and Title Design – Prudence Fenton and Phil Trumbo (won)
- 15th Daytime Emmy Awards – 1988
  - Outstanding Art Direction/Set Decoration/Scenic Design – Gary Panter, Wayne White, Ric Heitzman, Jeremy Railton, James Higginson, and Paul Reubens (won)
  - Outstanding Makeup – Ve Neill (won)
  - Outstanding Videotape Editing – John Ward Nielson for "Playhouse in Outer Space"
- 16th Daytime Emmy Awards – 1989
  - Outstanding Hairstyling – Yolanda Toussieng Jerry Masone for "To Tell The Tooth" (won, tied with The Oprah Winfrey Show)
  - Outstanding Videotape Editing – Charles Randazzo, Peter W. Moyer, David Pincus, and Steve Purcell for "To Tell The Tooth" (won)
  - Outstanding Film Sound Editing – Steve Kirklys, Steve Michael, Peter Cole, Ken Dahlinger, Greg Teall, and John Walker for "To Tell The Tooth" (won, tied with Muppet Babies)
- 18th Daytime Emmy Awards – 1991
  - Outstanding Graphics and Title Design – Paul Reubens, Prudence Fenton, and Dorne Huebler (won)
  - Outstanding Film Sound Editing – Peter Cole, Chris Trent, Glenn A. Jordan, Steve Kirklys, Ken Dahlinger, and John Walker (won)
  - Outstanding Film Sound Mixing – Bo Harwood, Peter Cole, Chris Trent, and Troy Smith (won)

== Episodes ==
Season	Episodes	Originally released	
Season	Episodes	First released	Last released
1	13	September 13, 1986	December 6, 1986
2	10	September 19, 1987	November 21, 1987
3	2	September 17, 1988	September 24, 1988
Christmas special		December 21, 1988	
4	10	September 16, 1989	November 18, 1989
5	10	September 15, 1990	November 17, 1990

=== Home media ===
==== Hi-Tops Video releases ====
- Vol. 1: "Ice Cream Soup"
- Vol. 2: "Luau for Two"
- Vol. 3: "Rainy Day" / "Now You See Me, Now You Don't" / "Cowboy Fun (Just Another Day)"
- Vol. 4: "Beauty Makeover"
- Vol. 5: "Restaurant"
- Vol. 6: "Ants in Your Pants"
- Vol. 7: "Monster in the Playhouse"
- Festival of Fun: "The Gang's All Here" / "Stolen Apples" / "Party" / "The Cowboy and the Cowntess" / "Monster in the Playhouse"
- Vol. 8: "Open House"
- Vol. 9: "Puppy in the Playhouse"
- Vol. 10: "Pajama Party"
- Vol. 11: "Pee-wee's Store"
- Vol. 12: "Pee-wee Catches a Cold"
- Vol. 13: "Tons of Fun"
- "Pee-wee's Playhouse Christmas Special"
- Vol. 14: "School"
- Vol. 15: "Why Wasn't I Invited?"

==== Hi-Tops Video LaserDisc releases ====
- Fun-o-Rama: "Ice Cream Soup" / "Luau for Two" / "Rainy Day" / "Now You See Me, Now You Don't"
- Potpourri: "Just Another Day" / "Beauty Makeover" / "The Restaurant" / "Ants in Your Pants"
- "Pee-wee's Playhouse Christmas Special" (also released by MGM/UA Home Video in 1996)

==== MGM/UA Home Video releases ====
- Vol. 1: "Open House" / "Pee-wee Catches a Cold"
- Vol. 2: "I Remember Curtis" / "Conky's Breakdown"
- Vol. 3: "Store" / "Playhouse in Outer Space"
- Vol. 4: "Pajama Party" / "To Tell the Tooth"
- Vol. 5: "The Gang's All Here" / "Party"
- Vol. 6: "Luau for Two" / "Now You See Me, Now You Don't"
- Vol. 7: "Fire in the Playhouse" / "Love That Story"
- Vol. 8: "Sick? Did Somebody Say Sick?" / "Miss Yvonne's Visit"
- "Pee-wee's Playhouse Christmas Special"
- Vol. 9: "Dr. Pee-wee and the Del Rubios" / "Rebarella"
- Vol. 10: "Let's Play Office" / "Mystery"
- Vol. 11: "Front Page Pee-wee" / "Tango Time"
- Vol. 12: "Playhouse Day" / "Accidental Playhouse"
- Vol. 13: "Ice Cream Soup" / "Puppy in the Playhouse"
- Vol. 14: "The Cowboy and the Cowntess" / "Reba Eats and Pterri Runs"
- Vol. 15: "Tons of Fun" / "School"
- Vol. 16: "Why Wasn't I Invited?" / "Ants in Your Pants"

=== DVD and Blu-Ray ===
Image Entertainment first released all 45 episodes of Pee-wee's Playhouse on DVD in 2004. The DVDs were marketed as containing "8 Lost shows" (meaning episodes that hadn't been released on video before). However, "Stolen Apples" had been first released on VHS from Hi-Tops Video in 1988 on the "Festival of Fun" tape.

On July 3, 2013, Shout! Factory announced that they had acquired the rights to the entire series from Paul Reubens, which was released on Blu-ray and DVD on October 21, 2014 (the release went out of print several years later). Shout! Factory reissued the complete series Blu-ray on August 27, 2024. In addition, the entire series was digitally reconstructed from the original 16 mm film elements and original audio tracks, with some special effects recreated digitally. The restored episodes have also been made available on streaming platforms in May 2024.

DVD name	Ep #	Release date	Notes
Pee-wee's Playhouse #1	23	November 16, 2004	Includes all episodes from Seasons 1 and 2
Pee-wee's Playhouse #2	22	November 16, 2004	Includes all episodes from Seasons 3 to 5
Pee Wee's Playhouse: Christmas Special	1	October 19, 2004	
Pee Wee's Playhouse: The Complete Collection	45 + 1	October 19, 2010	Includes all episodes from Seasons 1 to 5 plus the Christmas Special
Pee-wee's Playhouse: Seasons 1 and 2 (Special Edition)	23	October 21, 2014	Includes all episodes from Seasons 1 and 2 (Remastered)
Pee-wee's Playhouse: Seasons 3 to 5 (Special Edition)	23	March 10, 2015	Includes all episodes from Seasons 3 to 5 plus the Christmas Special (Remastered)

Blu-ray name	Ep #	Release date	Notes
Pee-wee's Playhouse: The Complete Series	45 + Special	October 21, 2014 August 27, 2024 (reissue)	Includes all 45 episodes plus the Christmas Special (Remastered)

=== Streaming ===
Currently, the show is available to stream on Amazon Prime Video, and Peacock, and can be streamed for free on Pluto TV, Tubi, Plex, and Amazon Freevee. The entire series was uploaded onto YouTube by the official Shout! Studios channel.
