= Higgins =

Higgins may refer to:

== People and fictional characters ==
- Higgins (surname), including a list of people and fictional characters with the surname

== Places ==
=== Australia ===
- Higgins, Australian Capital Territory, a suburb in the Canberra district of Belconnen
- Division of Higgins, an Australian electoral division in Victoria
- Higgins Field, a World War II airbase in Queensland

=== United States ===
- Higgins, North Carolina, a populated place
- Higgins, Texas, a city
- Higgins Township, Michigan
- Higgins Beach, a small beach in Maine
- Higgins Lake, Michigan

== Other uses ==
- Higgins (dog), a dog actor in Benji and Petticoat Junction
- Higgins boat, a landing craft used in amphibious warfare in World War II
- Higgins Industries, an American firm that manufactured the Higgins boat
- Higgins project, an open source framework for user-centric identity management
- Higgins Armory Museum, Worcester, Massachusetts, US
- Higgins Glass, art glass
- Higgins Building, Los Angeles, California, US
