= Senator Higgins =

Senator Higgins may refer to:

- Anthony Higgins (politician) (1840–1912), U.S. Senator from Delaware
- Carlisle W. Higgins (1889–1980), North Carolina State Senate
- Frank W. Higgins (1856–1907), New York State Senate
- James A. Higgins (1889–1962), New York State Senate
- Leon F. Higgins (fl. 1900s–1920s), Maine State Senate
- Linda Higgins (born 1950), Minnesota State Senate
- Marge Higgins (1931–2015), Nebraska State Senate
- Michael D. Higgins (born 1941), Senate of Ireland
- William L. Higgins (1867–1951), Connecticut State Senate
