= James Higginson (filmmaker) =

American artist and filmmaker (born 1957)

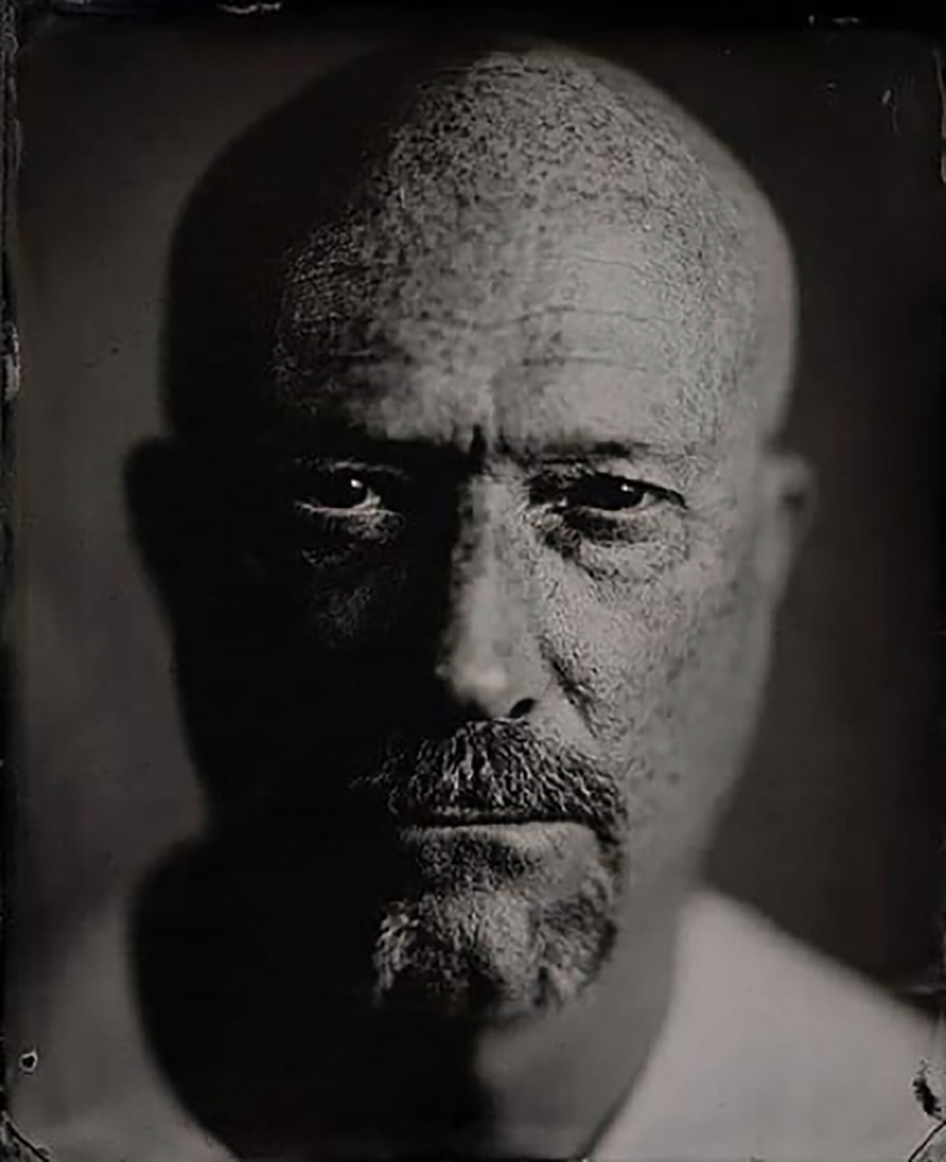
- James Higginson
- Born: James Harold Higginson, Jr; April 21, 1957 (age 69); Pittsburgh, Pennsylvania, USA
- Education: BS in Marine Biology from Pennsylvania State University (1978); MFA in Studio Art from Claremont Graduate University (1990)
- Occupations: Filmmaker, fine artist, photographer
- Years active: 1984–present
- Parent(s): James Harold and Louise Betterly Higginson
- Awards: See ↙ Awards section
- Website: www.allaluce.de www.jameshigginson.com

James Higginson (born April 21, 1957) is an American filmmaker, fine artist, and photographer based in Berlin, Germany. His artworks and films address social issues and expose human frailty.

== Early life and education ==
Born James Harold Higginson, Jr in Pittsburgh, Pennsylvania to James Harold and Louise Betterly Higginson. He is the oldest of 5 children, raised in a suburb of Scranton, Pennsylvania.

Higginson received his BS in Marine Biology in 1978 from Pennsylvania State University. He attended night school at Museum of Fine Arts School, Boston, Mass. and attended Art Center College of Design (1982-4). He received his MFA in Studio Art from Claremont Graduate University in 1990.

== Career ==
=== Marine biologist ===
Higginson was a biologist before becoming a fine artist. He worked as a research assistant for Texas State University at the St. Croix Marine Facility, USVI (1979) and as research technician at Boston University Biology Department (1980-2).

=== Getting started in art and film ===
He moved to Los Angeles to attend Art Center College of Design (1982) and was hired by a Disney subsidiary to work on a children’s TV show, “Welcome to Pooh Corner” (1984) and then Production Designed the TV show “Dumbo’s Circus”(1986).

In 1988, Higginson was awarded a Daytime Emmy with the creative team, Gary Panter, Ric Heitzman, Wayne White, Jeremy Railton, and Paul Rubens for the Production Design/Art Direction/Set Decoration of the CBS cult classic TV show, Pee-wee's Playhouse (1987-88). He worked as a set decorator for commercial director Joe Pytka and with set decorator Judi Giovanni on the film Sandlot (1993). He worked as the prop master for MADTV (1995-2003).

=== Art career ===
Higginson’s artworks diverge from painting and sculpture in his early career through performance and photography in mid-career and then into film.

==== Painting ====
As a painter, Higginson was invited to collaborate with Chinese Master Xie Tien Cheng in 1989 on a body of 30 paintings that combined techniques of Western conceptual art making with elements of traditional Eastern painting. Over the course of the five-week collaboration, the two artists contemporized the subjects, modes, and styles of the T’ang Dynasty (618-907 A.D.). as well, they addressed the tumultuous political climate of the current time and the events surrounding the Tiananmen Square Massacre. These paintings were exhibited at the Pacific Asia Museum, Pasadena, California in 1993.

==== Photography ====
Higginson’s photography took focus by the late 1990s. In “Portraits of Violence”, he tackled the issue of domestic violence with life-size, color, staged photographs. Using lectures, panel discussions, tours, and live performances, Higginson then expanded the dialogue between his artwork in the museum and the community. “Portraits of Violence” has been exhibited worldwide in galleries and museums in California, New York, Berlin (C/O Berlin), Budapest, and Cologne. A hardcover book of this photography series, POV:Portraits of Violence, was published in 2004.

=== Films ===
James Higginson grounded the production companies Avonbiehl (2011-2019) and Allaluce Films (2022-present) in support of film and photographic projects. He has produced, directed, written, and worked as the DOP for

- Willful Blindness (2012), an experimental feature,
- Devout (2017), a feature documentary, and
- Shuddhi (film, 2023), a docu-hybrid short film.

=== Teaching ===
Higginson is a guest lecturer, having addressed audiences at the University of Southern California, Otis School of Art, Claremont Graduate University, and Laguna Art Museum in California (USA). He has also addressed audiences at BTK (today UE Germany), FHTW, C/O Berlin, HBG (Germany), FOTO K (Vienna, Austria), University of East London (UK), Fatamorgana (Copenhagen, Denmark) and Pearl Academy, St Pauls College for Women, and Atharva College/Mumbai University (India). Higginson is an Adjunct Faculty currently teaching Photography at SRH-DAB, Berlin.

=== Organizations ===
- IATSE Local 44
- FAR (Foundation for Art Resources) — Board of Directors 1991–1993
- Visual Artist Guild — Board of Directors 2000–2003

== Awards ==
Award	Year	Category	With	Movie	Result
Daytime Emmy Award	1987/88	Art Direction, Set Decoration, Scenic Design	Gary Panter, Ric Heitzman, Wayne White, Jeremy Railton, Paul Rubens	Pee-wee's Playhouse	Won
LA Weekly Award	1990	Costume Design		A Hunger	Nominated
Cine Paris Film Festival	2023	Best Director — Short Documentary		Shuddhi	Won
Nice International Film Festival	2024	Best Director — Foreign Language Film		Shuddhi	Won

== Movies ==
=== Willful Blindness (2012) ===
Breaks the boundaries of distant memory and familiar present. Three interwoven narrative threads are reconstituted in an 'unconventional, experimental, kaleidoscopic rollercoaster ride' that becomes this visual experience. "Surreal and shocking, yet oddly meditative, is a stunning journey into personal choice and survival."

- Italian Premier: Screened during 55th Venice Biennale, 2013
- German Premier: Neuer Deutscher Film Series, Berlin, 2013

Award	Year	Category	Prize	Result
Vegas Indie Film Festival!	2012	Best Editing Feature	Silver Prize	Won
RIFE, Washington DC	2012	Best Experimental Film		Nominated
Lucerne International Film Festival	2012	Award of Merit		Won
Bridge International Film Festival	2012	Official Selection		Yes

Higginson takes the concept of film to its final limits---that it is not the camera that is the projector, it is us, our minds, reaching out of the depths of the repressed impulses who streams our darkest fears onto a helpless blank white screen. Powerful and moving, even frightening, Willful Blindness is an act of art.

— Jeanne Willette, IMDb review, June 2012

=== Devout (2017) ===
Provides a glimpse into the life of a 22-year-old Georgian Orthodox monk as he contemplates his understanding of faith. The film bears cinematic witness to his internalized struggle as it presents a visual portrait of the monks, their contemporary, ritualistic lives, and the work inside the monasteries.

Award	Year	Category	Prize	Result
Impact Doc Awards	2018	Documentary Feature	Award of Excellence	Won
Impact Doc Awards	2018	Cinematography	Award of Excellence	Won
Impact Doc Awards	2018	Original Score	Award of Excellence	Won
Indie Fest Awards	2018	Sound Editing / Sound Mixing	Award of Excellence	Won
Indie Fest Awards	2018		Award of Excellence	Won

=== Shuddhi (2023) ===
A poetic blend of documentary and auteur cinema, interweaves themes of humanness, fear, love, judgement, and the never-ending cycle of water. SHUDDHI reveals the reality of Hansen's Disease (Leprosy) and its enduring stigma, creating a meditative portrait of familial tenderness and cultural respect against the backdrop of India's rivers, landscapes, and a remaining hospital for the disease.

Award	Year	Category	Prize	Result
Cine Paris Film Festival	2023	Short Documentary	Best Director	Won
Cine Paris Film Festival	2023	Best Cinematography		Won
Indie Fest Awards	2023	Special Mention — Short Doc	Award of Excellence	Won
Indie Fest Awards	2023	Cinematography	Award of Excellence	Won
Rajasthan International Film Festival, RIFF	2024	Official Selection: World Premiere		Yes
Rajasthan International Film Festival, RIFF	2024	Best International Short Film		Won
Jaipur International Film Festival, JIFF	2024	Official Selection		Yes
Jaipur International Film Festival, JIFF	2024	Short Documentary	Special Mention Jury Award	Won
Nice International Film Festival	2024	Official Selection: European Premiere		Yes
Nice International Film Festival	2024	Best Foreign Language Film		Nominated
Nice International Film Festival	2024	Foreign Language Film	Best Director	Won
Nice International Film Festival	2024	Documentary Film	Best Editing	Nominated
Nice International Film Festival	2024		Science Award	Nominated
Indie Fest Awards	2024	2023 Humanitarian Award	Outstanding Achievement	Won
Madrid International Film Festival	2024	Official Selection		Yes

== Outreach and community engagement ==
Higginson’s interest to serve the community has reached outside the Fine Art World. To utilize the arts as a tool to elevate public awareness of pressing social problems, Higginson established the graphic design company d3G in 1999. d3G created graphics, photography, and artwork for community-focused projects designed to educate, inform, and inspire current and future generations.

During 2000-01, d3G focused on HIV education creating a Safe Sex Campaign in cooperation with the US cities of West Hollywood and Los Angeles and organizations including Aid for AIDS, L.A. Shanti, and the Van Ness House. Media coverage of this campaign extended to Berlin, Germany, with magazine articles discussing the significance of Safe Sex in the gay community. In June 2001, Higginson’s image, entitled Metamorphize, was selected to represent the event commemorating the 20th Anniversary of AIDS in Los Angeles. The d3G tagline, “become someone to admire” branded the citywide, multi-media day of remembrance.

== Exhibitions ==
=== Solo exhibitions ===
- 1987: Brethern, Eilat Gordin Gallery, Los Angeles, California
- 1989: The China Paintings, Grand Hall, Guilin, P.R.China.
- 1990: o.u. being, East Gallery, Claremont Graduate School, Claremont, California
- 1992: The Continuation of Life Series, Bevery Hills Library, California
- 1992: The China Paintings, Pacific Asia Museum, Pasadena, California
- 2000: Shapes & Compositions, MillerDurazo Gallery, Los Angeles, California
- 2001: Nachdenken/Ponderance, MillerDurazo Gallery, Los Angeles, California
- 2002: POV: The Story of Shelley, Post, Los Angeles, California
- 2003: POV: Sacrifice, Momenta Art, Brooklyn, New York
- 2003: Portraits of Violence, C/O Berlin, Berlin, Germany
- 2005: Recollections, Sala Museale del Baraccano, Bologna, Italy
- 2005: I LOVE YOU: Portraits Against Violence, Ernst Museum, Budapest, Hungary
- 2006: Searching Sierra Madre, Raab Galerie, Berlin, Germany
- 2007: I LOVE YOU: Portraits Against Violence, Studio DuMont, Cologne, Germany
- 2007: Inheritance, Raab Galerie, Berlin
- 2015: BEHOLD: Perspectives at play in a young man’s mind, Haus am Kleistpark, Berlin, Germany

=== Selected group exhibitions ===
- 1989: Art & Democracy, Merging One Gallery, Santa Monica, California
- 1992: FarBazaar, Los Angeles, CA
- 1993: Sue Spaid Fine Art, Los Angeles, California
- 1994: Symbolic Garments, Cypress College Gallery, Cypress, California
- 1999: Scapeland, Post, Los Angeles, California
- 1999: Big Wave 2, Andrew Shire Gallery, Los Angeles, California
- 1999: Art & Democracy II, Merging One Gallery, Santa Monica, California
- 2001: Post, Los Angeles, California
- 2002: Post, Los Angeles, California
- 2002: Gallery Kobo Chika, Tokyo, Japan
- 2004: Aufruhr der Gefuehle, Kunsthalle Goeppingen, Goeppingen, Germany
- 2004: Aufruhr der Gefuehle, Museum of Photography, Braunschweig, Germany
- 2005: DEFENSE: Body and Nobody in Self Protection, UC at Riverside, CA.
- 2007: Berlin-LA Interface, Ballhaus Naunynstrasse, Berlin
- 2007: Like There is no Tomorrow, Galerie Caprice Horn, Berlin
- 2008: Fotogalerie Wien, Wien, Austria
- 2008: Tammen Galerie, Berlin
- 2009: Tammen Galerie, Berlin
- 2010: Tammen Galerie, Berlin
- 2010: Europäischer Monat der Fotografie Wien
- 2010: PIXXELPOINT Video Festival, Gorizia

=== Selected performances ===
- 1988: The Goat Story, Drama Workshop, Sydney, Australia.
- 1989: The Goat Story, LACE Rough Cuts & UCLA Works in Progress, Los Angeles, CA
- 1989: John Woodall’s Gim Crack, Museum of Contemporary Art, Los Angeles, CA
- 1990: o.u. being, Claremont Graduate School, Claremont, CA
- 1990: A HUNGER, igLoo Theater, Los Angeles Festival for Freedom of Expression
- 1994: o.u. being, Cypress College, Cypress, CA
- 1998: Lao Niao, Akademie der Kunst, Berlin, Germany
- 1999: Lao Niao, Merging One Gallery, Santa Monica, California
- 2003: Lao Niao: A Walk with Light to Love, C/O Berlin, Berlin, Germany
