= This machine kills fascists =

Slogan coined by Woody Guthrie

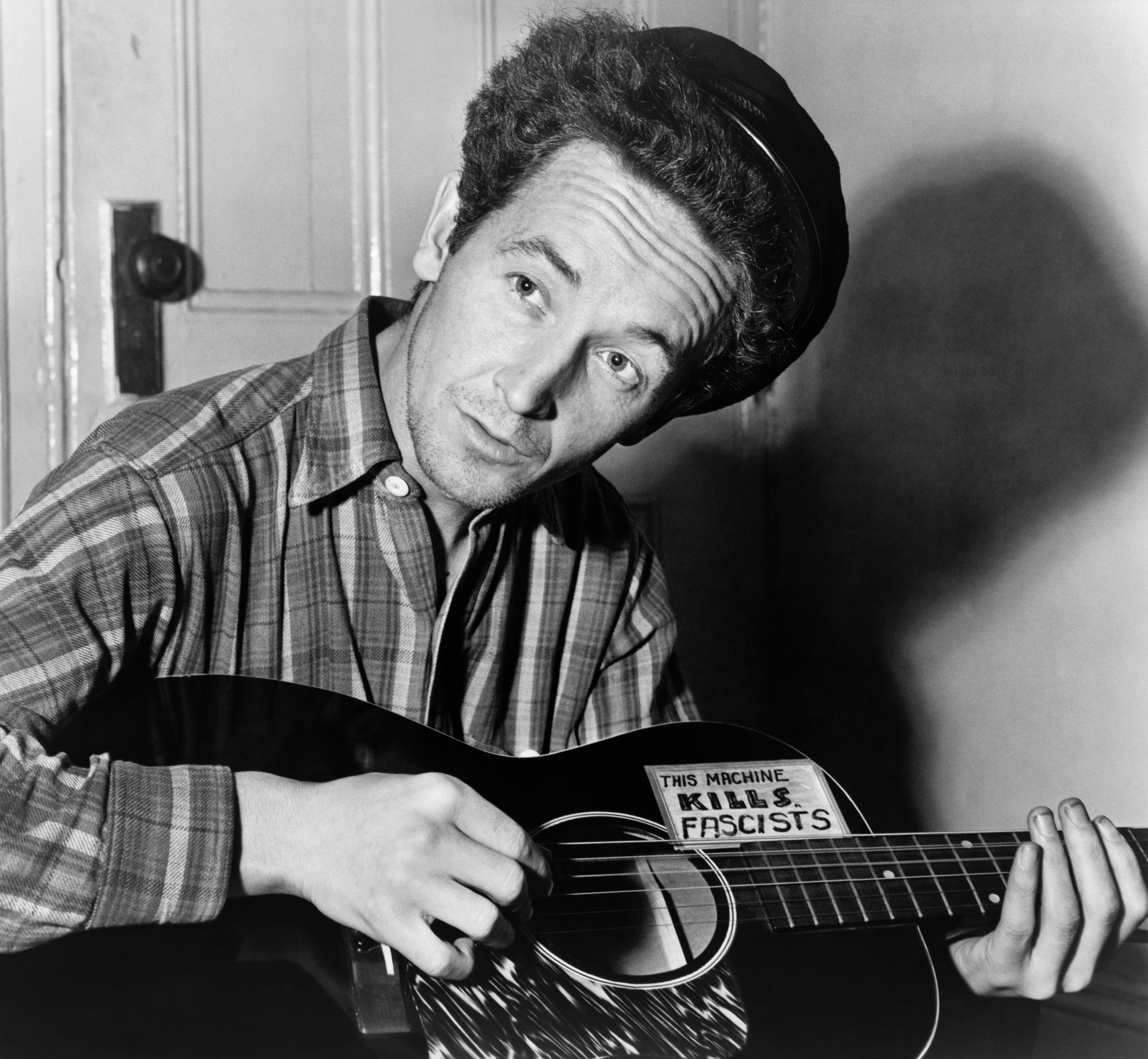
Woody Guthrie in March 1943 with his guitar labeled "THIS MACHINE KILLS FASCISTS"

"This machine kills fascists" is a message that American musician Woody Guthrie placed on his guitars in the mid-1940s, starting in 1943.

The idea originated from a sticker that American machinists affixed to metalworking lathes and drill presses to support the war effort.

== Conception ==
Circa 1943, in the midst of World War II, Guthrie wrote the war song "Talking Hitler's Head Off Blues." This was printed in the Daily Worker, a newspaper published by the Communist Party USA. Then, according to biographer Anne E. Neimark, "In a fit of patriotism and faith in the impact of the song, he painted on his guitar THIS MACHINE KILLS FASCISTS."

== Guthrie's stance against fascism ==
In Guthrie's opposition to fascism, he conceptualized the ideology "as a form of economic exploitation similar to slavery," straightforwardly denouncing the fascists—particularly their leaders (dictators)—as a group of gangsters who set out to "rob the world." This recalled a protest strategy he had used "during the Great Depression, when social, political, and economic inequality had been engendered by a small rich elite." During that era, Guthrie had "romanticized the deeds of outlaws such as Jesse James, Pretty Boy Floyd, Calamity Jane or the Dalton Gang both as legitimate acts of social responsibility and as 'the ultimate expression of protest,' thus transforming the outlaw into an archetypal partisan in a fight against those who were held responsible for the worsening social and economic conditions."

In this, Guthrie cast those opposing fascism not as mere outlaws in a fascist state, but as heroes rising "in times of economic turmoil and social disintegration" to fight "a highly illegitimate criminal endeavor intended to exploit the common people." Guthrie portrayed these characters as something larger than merely "dumb gangsters," while his lyricism also "externalized the inhuman element of fascism by describing its representatives as animals that were usually held in very low esteem and were associated with a range of bad character traits." For example, he talked about the "Nazi Snake" that has to be countered in his song "Talking Hitler's Head Off Blues". Guthrie would declare "[a]nything human is anti Hitler" and in his song "You Better Get Ready" he has the figure of Satan declare that "Old Hell just ain't the same/Compared to Hitler, hell, I'm tame!" Guthrie saw the battle against fascism as the ultimate battle of good versus evil. In a letter to "Railroad Pete" he stated "fascism and freedom are the only two sides battling ... [this was the war] the world has been waiting on for twenty five million years ... [which would] settle the score once and for all."

== Legacy ==
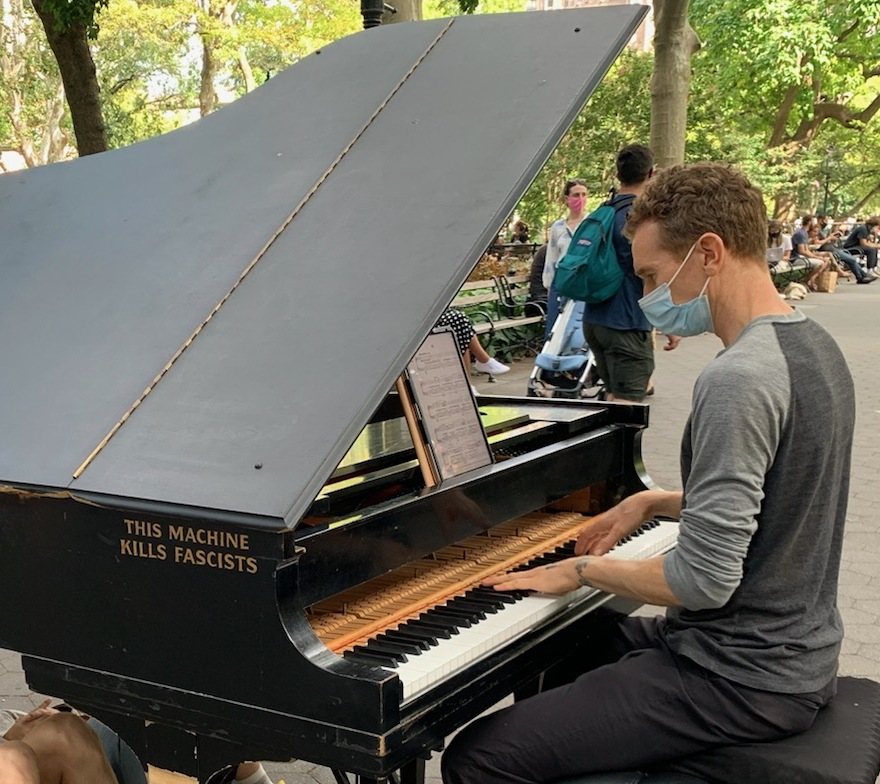
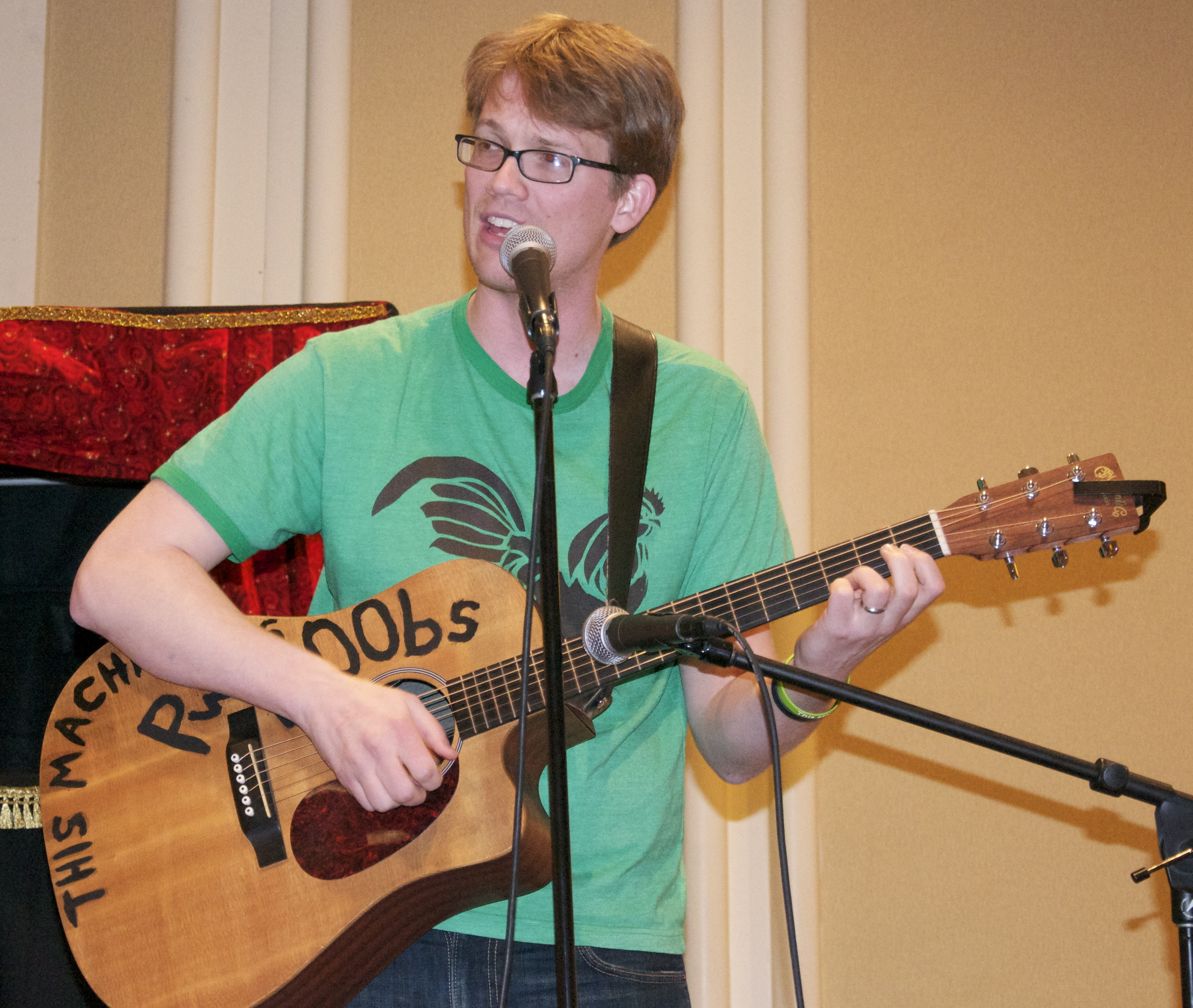
(Top) Colin Huggins's grand piano and (bottom) Hank Green's guitar have messages inspired by Guthrie.

The message has inspired subsequent artists.

- Folk singer Pete Seeger, a friend and mentee of Guthrie, was inspired to emblazon his banjos with the similar slogan "This Machine Surrounds Hate and Forces It to Surrender".
- Author John Green of Vlogbrothers added a sticker with the message onto his laptop for the series Crash Course. The phrase, in the context of Guthrie, was also featured in Green's novel Paper Towns and in the book's movie adaptation.
- Hank Green, co-host of Vlogbrothers and brother of the aforementioned John, released an album titled This Machine Pwns N00bs in 2009, with the Guthrie's original slogan translated into leetspeak. Hank also has an acoustic guitar with this version of the slogan painted on it in the style of Guthrie.
- Guitarist Tom Morello of Rage Against the Machine was inspired by Guthrie to put a slogan on every guitar he owns like "Arm The Homeless," "Soul Power," "Sendero Luminoso," and many more.
- New York City street performer Colin Huggins inscribed the message on his Steinway grand piano.
- Donovan put the message "This machine kills" on his guitar, leaving off the word "fascists"; he explained in his autobiography, "I dropped the last word, thinking fascism was already dead."
- The Dropkick Murphys' 11th studio album, composed of songs set to unused lyrics and words by Guthrie, is titled This Machine Still Kills Fascists.
- Pittsburgh-based punk band Anti-Flag's 2001 album Underground Network includes a song entitled "This Machine Kills Fascists".
- Musician Julien Baker had a sticker reading "This Machine Kills Sadness" on her acoustic guitar in reference to Guthrie, although she later removed it. She further references him in a tattoo and in the song "Guthrie" from the EP B-Sides.
- Guthrie and his 'This machine kills fascists' guitar are depicted as stickers on another guitar on the sleeve of Show of Hands' Wake the Union (2012).
- The 2016 French comic album Cette machine tue les fascistes centers around an IS-2 Soviet tank painted with the slogan in Russian. The story makes explicit that the slogan is taken from Guthrie's guitar.
- In the film Handsome Devil, Ned plays a guitar with the phrase written on it in the same style as Guthrie.
- Musician Rob Baker of the group The Tragically Hip has "This Machine Kills Fascists" on his acoustic guitar in the official video for "Bobcaygeon".
- Upon The White Stripes suing the Donald Trump 2024 presidential campaign for copyright infringement, front-man Jack White captioned an Instagram post about the lawsuit "This machine sues fascists."
- Classical musician John Mark Rozendaal was arrested in 2024 at a climate protest in New York City while playing a cello inscribed "This machine loves, serves, and protects life".
- Spanish surf rock band The Gagarins composed an instrumental song titled "This Machine Kills Fascists" included on their 2018 album Por un puñado de rublos.
- This Comp Kills Fascists Vol. 1 is a compilation album released by Relapse Records focusing on grindcore and powerviolence bands. Many song titles and lyrics are politically charged (including the album title), mainly speaking against capitalism and fascism.
- Frank Iero from My Chemical Romance added "This Machine Kills Fascists" sticker on his guitar during the 2024 L.S. Dunes tour.
- The world-renowned cybersecurity expert and computer scientist Bruce Schneier has a sticker "This machine kills fascists" on his laptop, as can be seen on his home page.
- The perpetrator of the Christchurch mosque shootings inscribed numerous symbols and phrases on his weapons, including "This machine kills communists."
- The anti-MAGA country musician Brian Andrews has a guitar with "This Machine Kills Fascists" inscribed on it, prominently used in music videos criticizing modern fascist movements.

== See also ==
- List of guitars
