= Justice Higgins =

Justice Higgins may refer to:

- Andrew Jackson Higgins (judge) (1921–2011), chief justice of the Supreme Court of Missouri
- Archibald T. Higgins (1894–1945), associate justice of the Louisiana Supreme Court
- Carlisle W. Higgins (1889–1980), associate justice of the North Carolina Supreme Court
- H. B. Higgins (1851–1929), justice of the High Court of Australia
