= Green Fire (disambiguation) =

Green Fire is a 1954 American drama film.

Green Fire may also refer to:

== Film ==
- Green Fire, a 2012 documentary by Center for Humans and Nature
- Green Fire, an award of the San Francisco Green Film Festival

== Literature ==
- Green Fire: A Romance, an 1896 novel by William Sharp
- Green Fire (novel), a 1928 American science fiction novel by John Taine
- Green Fire, a 1986 romance novel by Jayne Ann Krentz writing as Stephanie James
- Green Fire, a 1963 Ace single volume novel by Anne Maybury
- Green Fire, a 1946 Armed Service Edition by Peter W. Rainier
- "The Green Fire" or Het Groene Vuur", a 1965 comic story featuring Adhemar
- Green Fire Times, a newspaper in New Mexico

== Other uses ==
- Green Fire, a Thoroughbred racehorse that won the 1924 Greenham Stakes
- Green Fire, a public artwork in San Diego by Robert Verhees
- "Green Fire", a 1954 song by Joe Leahy from Desiree
- "Green Fire", a motto of some units of the Kenya Army
- Green fire, a 2007 software bug and in-game plague in World of Warcraft
- Colored fire, a common science experiment - the color green is usually made with boric acid or other boron compounds.

== See also ==
- Goddess of the Green Fire, a character from The Settlers: Rise of an Empire
- Green Ridge Fire (2020), a 2020 Oregon wildfire
- The Green Inferno (disambiguation)
- Teenage Mutant Ninja Turtles/Flaming Carrot: The Land of Green Fire, a 1993 intercompany crossover comic book series
