= Henry Charles Huggins =

Henry Charles Huggins (17 May 1891 – 14 April 1977) was a British naturalist with interest in the butterflies and freshwater molluscs. He took a special interest in the smaller moths, particularly the Tortricidae.

"Harry" Huggins was born in Gravesend where his father Henry was a Justice of the Peace who also took an interest in entomology. Huggins became interested in natural history at an early age and his mentors included Rev. C.R.N. Burrows and A.B. Farn (a distant relative). He collected specimens in Kent over forty years. He also collected extensively in Ireland from 1913 to 1973 making 36 visits.

Huggins became a member of the South London Entomological and Natural History Society in 1934. His collection of 19000 specimens was bequeathed to the Natural History Museum, London.
