= Shuddhi (2023 film) =

- Film poster
- Directed by: James Higginson
- Written by: James Higginson
- Produced by: James Higginson
- Starring: Babla Kochar – Baba-VO; Jashn Srivastav – Dittu-VO; Rehan Katyal – Dittu; Dhan Ji – Self; Bagh Ji – Self; Herra Ma – Self; Singari Devi – Self; Basanti Devi – Self; Bharti Bhai – Self; Ranjeet – Self; Gokul – Self
- Edited by: Jill D'Agnenica A.C.E.; Donia Sallam
- Music by: Roland Hackl
- Production companies: Allaluce, Berlin
- Release date: 2023
- Country: India
- Language: Hindi

Shuddhi is a documentary hybrid film which explores the emotional aspects of Hansen's Disease (leprosy) by portraying genuine stories and conversations with patients in India.

It offers a contemplative depiction of a family bond between grandfather (Baba) and grandson (Dittu) with cultural reverence, set against India's rivers (Ganges, Beas, and Yamuna), scenic landscapes, and one of the country's remaining hospitals dedicated to the disease.

== Background ==
In 2012, James Higginson embarked on a photography assignment at Nimba Nimbadi Hospital in Jodhpur, where he encountered the stark realities faced by Leprosy patients. The lack of awareness and persevering stigma surrounding the disease motivated him to create a film that goes beyond conventional storytelling, aiming to give voice to the stories and history of these patients in an auteur-documentary form.

== Social Relevance ==
Shuddhi strives to foster conversations and highlight the importance of support programs, aiming to break down the social stigma that hampers the expansion of the free testing and treatment efforts.

Higginson sees Shuddhi as a means to promote understanding, inclusion, and more positive attitudes toward Leprosy. By advocating for early detection tests, the MDT medication program, and preventive measures supported by government and non-profit organizations, leprosy can be rendered inconsequential.

SHUDDHI can be embraced to increase sensitivity and serve to improve public understanding of disabilities. SHUDDHI is an emotional journey, a call to action, and a symbol of hope all in one. I choose to tell stories that touch my heart, and then hopefully, in turn, touch the hearts of the audience.

— James Higginson, Times of India

The impact campaign of Shuddhi has received letters of support from NLR International (Until No Leprosy Remains), NLR India Foundation, NHR Brazil, Raoul Follereau Foundation France, DAHW Deutsche Lepra- und Tuberkulosehilfe e. V., and INFOLEP.

== Awards ==
Award	Year	Category	Prize	Result
Cine Paris Film Festival	2023	Short Documentary	Best Director	Won
Cine Paris Film Festival	2023	Best Cinematography		Won
Indie Fest Awards	2023	Special Mention – Short Doc	Award of Excellence	Won
Indie Fest Awards	2023	Cinematography	Award of Excellence	Won
Rajasthan International Film Festival, RIFF	2024	Official Selection: Word Premiere		Yes
Rajasthan International Film Festival, RIFF	2024	Best International Short Film		Won
Jaipur International Film Festival, JIFF	2024	Official Selection		Yes
Jaipur International Film Festival, JIFF	2024	Short Documentary	Special Mention Jury Award	Won
Nice International Film Festival	2024	Official Selection: European Premiere		Yes
Nice International Film Festival	2024	Best Foreign Language Film		Nominated
Nice International Film Festival	2024	Foreign Language Film	Best Director	Won
Nice International Film Festival	2024	Documentary Film	Best Editing	Nominated
Nice International Film Festival	2024		Science Award	Nominated
Indie Fest Awards	2024	2023 Humanitarian Award	Outstanding Achievement	Won
Madrid International Film Festival	2024	Official Selection		Yes
