= Bremer Island =

Island in the Northern Territory, Australia

Native name: Banu Banu/Dhambaliya
- Location within Northern Territory

Geography
- Location: Arafura Sea
- Coordinates: 12°06′22″S 136°48′41″E
- Area: 16 km^{2} (6.2 sq mi)
- Length: 7.7 km (4.78 mi)
- Width: 3.0 km (1.86 mi)
- Highest elevation: 29 m (95 ft)
- Highest point: unnamed

Administration
- Australia
- Territory: Northern Territory
- Shire: West Arnhem Region
- Ward: Gumurr Miwatj Ward
- Largest settlement: Gutjangan (pop. 25)

Demographics
- Population: 25
- Pop. density: 1.5/km^{2} (3.9/sq mi)
- Ethnic groups: Rirratjingu clan of the Yolngu people

Bremer Island, or Dhambaliya in the local language is an island in the Arafura Sea, in the northwest of the Gulf of Carpentaria, 3.4 km off the northeast corner of Arnhem Land (Cape Wirawawoi), Northern Territory, Australia.

== History ==
The island was named Melville Island by Matthew Flinders during his circumnavigation voyage in 1803. The island was renamed Bremer Island in 1934 to avoid confusion with the larger Melville Island, part of the Tiwi Island Group just north of Darwin. A European settlement named Fort Dundas had been established on the larger Melville Island in 1824 by Sir James J. Gordon Bremer, but the settlement was unsuccessful and was abandoned in 1828.

== Geography ==
It is 7.7 km long north–south, and up to 3.0 km wide, and has an area of about 16 km^{2}. The town of Nhulunbuy lies five kilometers away on the mainland of Arnhem Land. The island is inhabited by about 25 Rirratjingu, a clan of the Yolngu tribe. The only small settlement, a family outstation in the north of the island near the airfield is called Gutjangan (formerly Bremer Island North).

Alcohol consumption is illegal on Bremer Island. Only tourists are allowed to consume small quantities. Only up to eight tourists are allowed to stay on the island at any given time. The only tourist facility is the small Banubanu Beach Retreat at the northern tip of the island.

The island is surrounded by a beach, on which sea turtles dig their eggs into the sand. Bremer Island is also home to many birds. 4.5 km east of the island are the East Bremer Islets, a group of small rocky islets, including Higginson Island, which form the Higginson Important Bird Area.
