= The Green Inferno =

The Green Inferno or variation, may refer to:

- Natura contro (film), also known as The Green Inferno, a 1988 Italian film
- The Green Inferno (film), a 2013 film
- "Zelený peklo" (song), also known as "Green Inferno", a 1997 song by 'Chaozz' off the album Zprdeleklika
- "Green Inferno" (song), a song by 'Agoraphobic Nosebleed' off the 2005 album Bestial Machinery (Discography Volume 1)

== See also ==
- Green Fire (disambiguation)
- Green Hell (disambiguation)
