= Jill Higginson =

American biomechanical engineer

Jill Startzell Higginson is an American biomechanical engineer and an expert on gait. Her research involves the observation of gait, the contributions of different muscles to gait, and the diagnosis of muscular problems involving gait. Her work specifically focuses on neuromuscular biomechanics, musculoskeletal modeling and simulation, and improving movement in individuals with pathological conditions. She is George W. Laird Professor of Mechanical Engineering at the University of Delaware, and the head of the university's Neuromuscular Biomechanics Lab. She also serves as the Director of Engineering Driven Health at the University of Delaware, an initiative that integrates engineering and healthcare to improve patient outcomes.

== Education and Career ==
Higginson majored in mechanical engineering at Cornell University, graduating in 1996. After a master's degree in bioengineering from Pennsylvania State University in 1998, she completed a PhD in mechanical engineering at Stanford University in 2005, jointly advised by Felix Zajac and Scott L. Delp.

She joined the University of Delaware as an assistant professor in the Department of Mechanical Engineering in 2004, and was tenured there in 2010. Her research has included collaborative, peer reviewed studies on musculoskeletal simulation and the biomechanics of human movement, contributing to a deeper understanding of muscle coordination and gait mechanics.

== Research ==
Higginson’s research centers on understanding and improving human movement, particularly in individuals with neurological or musculoskeletal impairments. Through computational modeling and experimental analysis, her lab investigates how muscles coordinate during walking and how impairments alter movement patterns. Her work aims to develop improved rehabilitation strategies and assistive technologies to enhance mobility and quality of life.

== Recognition ==
Higginson was elected as a Fellow of the American Institute for Medical and Biological Engineering in 2019, “for contributions to the field of neuromuscular biomechanics of pathological movement, musculoskeletal modeling and simulation, and undergraduate research and education”. She was named as an ASME Fellow in 2021,and as a Fellow of the American Society of Biomechanics in 2023.

Her induction into the American Institute for Medical and Biological Engineering recognizes her leadership and significant contributions to both research and education within the field of biomedical engineering.
