= Higgins, North Carolina =

Populated place in North Carolina, US

Coordinates: 35.959556°N 82.380153°W

Higgins is a populated place in Egypt Township in Yancey County, North Carolina, United States. Already in decline in the 1920s, it was revived by a Presbyterian missionary who obtained support from the Markle Foundation in the 1930s, but has since been largely abandoned. Under the name of "Henry", it was a case study in Cities and the Wealth of Nations, by Jane Jacobs, who spent six months there in 1934.

== Location ==
Higgins is on the Cane River and Highway 19 West. It is 12 miles from the county seat of Yancey County, Burnsville, and its elevation is 2411 or 2390 feet.

== History ==
Higgins was founded in the early 18th century by three brothers named Higgins, and continued to be inhabited mainly by their descendants into the 1920s. It was named for John Higgins.

In 1922 Martha Robison, a worker for the Board of National Missions of the Presbyterian Church, arrived for a three-month stay to establish housing for a missionary and decided to live there permanently. In November 1929 she received a letter from her cousin, John Markle, a coal magnate, who offered her help. Markle and the John and Mary R. Markle Foundation provided funds for a building, completed in 1931, containing a community library, a meeting room, a clinic, and on the upper floor spaces for woodwork, weaving, and pottery. The local people sold crafts, honey, and molasses; Eleanor Roosevelt visited and made a purchase on July 3, 1934. The Markle Building also temporarily housed the local school. It formed part of a group of masonry buildings including the Holland Memorial Church and Kirksedge Cottage. The Markle Handicraft School was a member of the Southern Highland Craft Guild.

The Markle Foundation was the major beneficiary of John Markle's will on his death in 1933, but later changed its focus and cut off funding to Higgins.

== Jane Jacobs ==
Jane Jacobs, the urban activist and writer, was Robison's niece and lived with her in Higgins for six months in 1934. She later used Higgins, under the name "Henry", as an example in Cities and the Wealth of Nations, analyzing its decline as the result of its being cut off by bad roads from cities, so that the people had been reduced to subsistence and over generations had forgotten the skills they once had, and even that such skills existed; for example, that a church could be built of stone.
