= Green Hell =

Green Hell or green hell may mean:

- Green Hell (film), a 1940 adventure film directed by James Whale
- "Green Hell" (song), by Misfits
- The traditional north loop of the Nürburgring race track
- a former description of the Amazon jungle
- Green Hell (video game), a video game developed by Creepy Jar

== See also ==
- This Green Hell (film), a 1936 British comedy film
- "Last Caress/Green Hell" (song), a Metallica song
- The Green Inferno (disambiguation)
- Green (disambiguation)
- Hell (disambiguation)
