= Colin Huggins =

American classical pianist and street performer (born 1978)

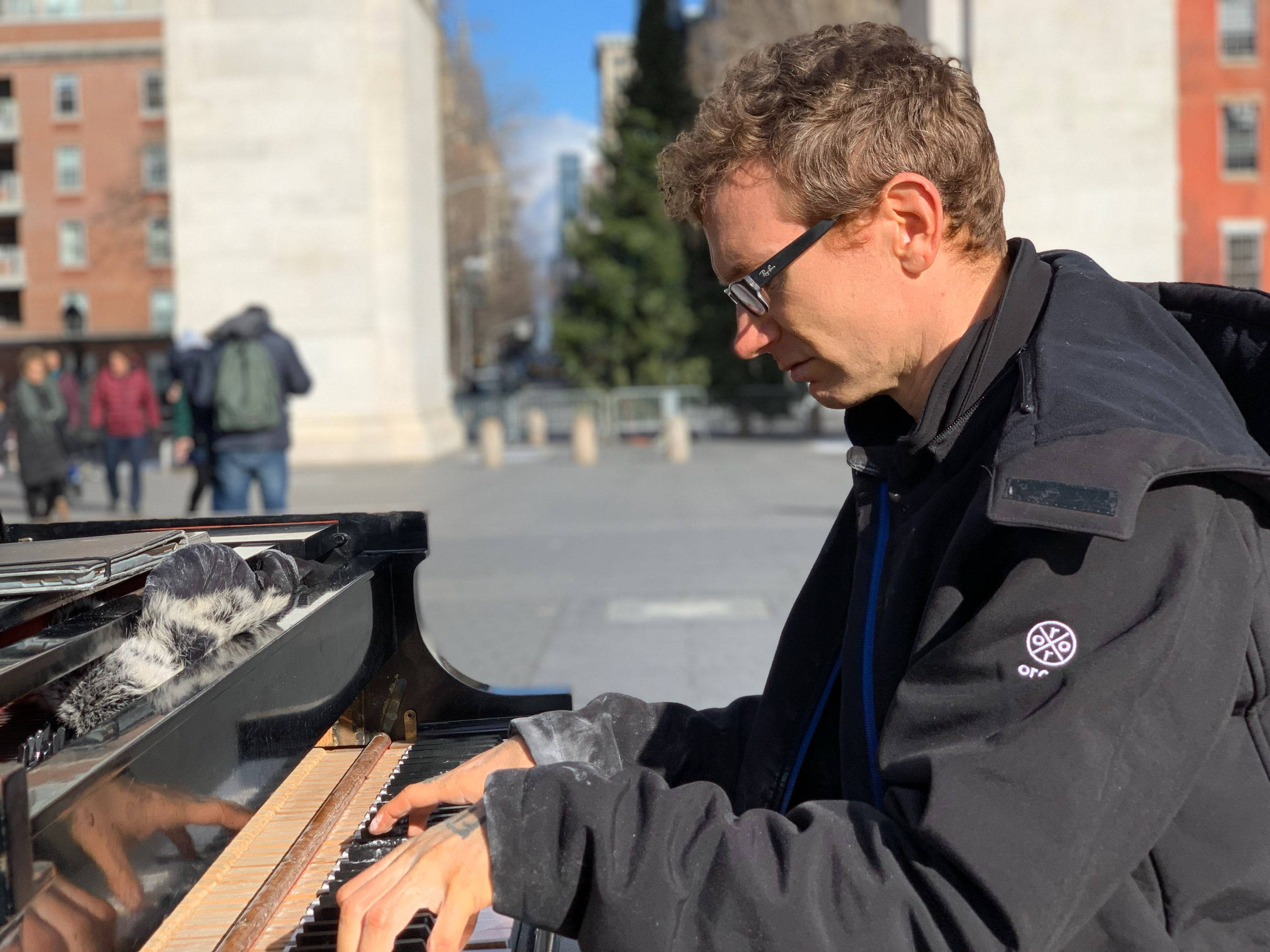
- Huggins playing piano in January 2019

Background information
- Born: January 6, 1978 (age 48); Decatur, Georgia, U.S.
- Origin: New York City, U.S.
- Genre: Classical
- Occupation: Pianist
- Instrument: Piano
- Years active: 2003–present

Colin Huggins (born January 6, 1978) is an American classical pianist and street performer in New York City. He is known for his frequent performances in New York City on a grand piano which he transports and plays outside, and he has become known as "the piano man of Washington Square Park".

== Early life ==
Huggins grew up in Decatur, Georgia, where he began playing guitar at an early age and took piano lessons from ages 16 to 20. Other than those lessons, he is largely self-taught on the piano. For income, he worked odd jobs, such as baking and working as a bike messenger. A visit to Boston led Huggins to develop an interest in performing piano in a professional capacity for ballet. He worked as a ballet accompanist until his girlfriend broke up with him and in 2003, Huggins moved to New York City and became an accompanist for the American Ballet Theatre for several years and also worked as the music director at Joffrey Ballet School.

== Career ==
In 2007, he performed in Union Square and enjoyed the experience so much that he became a full-time street performer.

Huggins would transport a beat-up upright piano that he purchased from Craigslist to Father Demo Square and Union Square. He performed there until police and nearby residents complained about the large crowds he would attract. Huggins then began to play piano two or three times a week in New York City Subway stations and at Washington Square Park, playing for up to twelve hours at a time.

In 2011, Huggins accumulated fines of $6,000 from the New York City Department of Parks and Recreation for performing near monuments and park benches. In 2012, the policy changed to allow performers like Huggins to continue to perform. Huggins noted the historical connection that Washington Square Arch has to pianists, citing Ignacy Jan Paderewski's sponsorship of its construction in 1892.

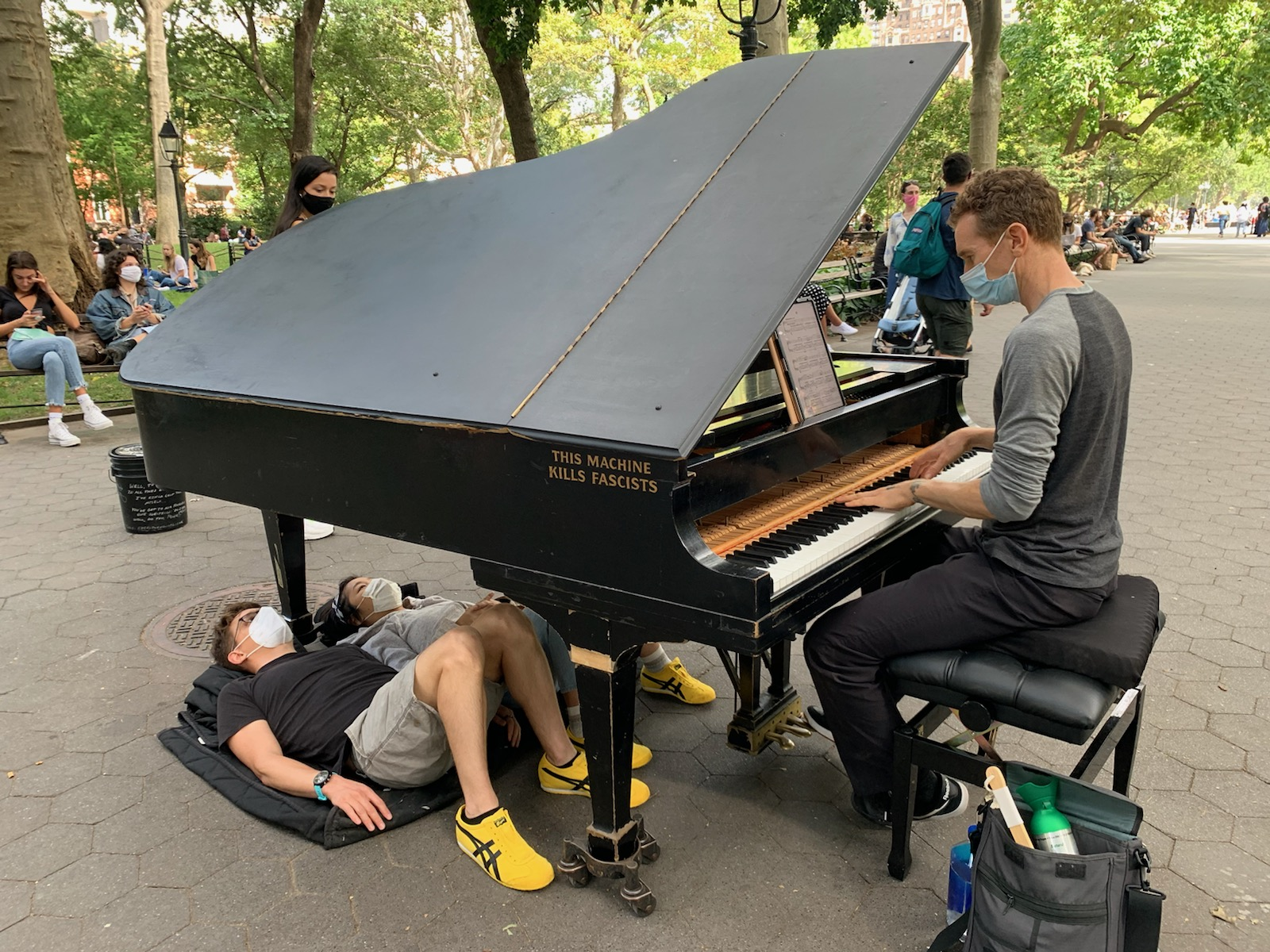
People lying underneath Huggins' piano as he plays in Spring 2021

Huggins has used crowdfunding campaigns to purchase baby grand pianos for his outdoor performances. In 2018, Huggins raised $30,000 on Kickstarter to purchase a 900-pound 1958 Steinway B grand piano that The New York Times described as "the majestic lure that helps draw audiences to him." Huggins is known for inviting listeners to lie beneath his pianos while he plays. His pianos bear an inscription reading "this machine kills fascists", inspired by a sticker that Woody Guthrie placed on his guitar during World War II that bore the same message.

=== Impact of COVID-19 ===
In 2020, the COVID-19 pandemic severely impacted Huggins' ability to earn sufficient income by performing. He moved performances online during the lockdown and made attempts to adapt his act to further support himself.

== In creative works ==
Huggins has made appearances in television series, including as himself in 2011 on the series Louie and in 2020 on Little Voice.

== Personal life ==
Huggins is vegan. In September 2022 Huggins became homeless and sleeps on top of his piano in the park at night.
