= Ric Heitzman =

- Born: November 23, 1953 (age 72); Los Angeles, California, U.S.
- Known for: Pee-wee's Playhouse
- Website: richeitzman.com

Ric Heitzman is an American artist, voice actor, designer, and academic.

== Biography ==
Born in Los Angeles, Heitzman worked on the television series Pee-wee's Playhouse as a production designer alongside Gary Panter and Wayne White. He also voiced characters in the series such as Mr. Window, Cool Cat and the Salesman. In 1987 he won the Daytime Emmy Award for Outstanding Technical Direction/ Electronic Camera Work/ Video Control for Drama Series for his work on Pee-wee's Playhouse. He was nominated for the 1989 Primetime Emmy Award for Outstanding Art Direction for a Variety or Music Program for Christmas at Pee-wee's Playhouse.

Heitzman's work was included in the 1988 exhibit "Sideshows" at the National Gallery of Art of Washington D.C. In 2012 his work was included in the Museum Of Modern Art's exhibit "Century of the Child: Growing by Design, 1900–2000". His work has also been exhibited at The Art Institute of Chicago and the Contemporary Arts Museum Houston.

Heitmzman taught on the art faculty of Woodbury University where he is currently a professor emeritus. In 2022 he was a Hixson-Lied Visiting Artist and Scholar at the Lincoln School of Art at the University of Nebraska–Lincoln. He has also taught on the faculties of the School of the Art Institute of Chicago, the Illinois Institute of Technology, the University of Southern California, and the California Institute of Arts.
