= Jack Higgins (rugby league) =

English rugby league footballer

Personal information
- Full name: Jack Lyles Higgins
- Born: unknown

Playing information
- Position: Scrum-half
Club
Years	Team	Pld	T	G	FG	P
1941–48	Featherstone Rovers	100	15	13	0	71

Jack Higgins (birth unknown) is a former professional rugby league footballer who played in the 1940s. He played at club level for Featherstone Rovers, as an occasional goal-kicking scrum-half.

== Playing career ==
Higgins made his début for Featherstone Rovers on Monday 21 April 1941.

=== Testimonial match ===
Higgins's benefit season at Featherstone Rovers, following a serious injury that forced his retirement, took place during the 1946–47 season.
