= General Higgins =

General Higgins may refer to:

- Edward Higgins (1864–1947), General of The Salvation Army
- Edward Higgins (Confederate general) (1821–1875), Confederate States Army brigadier general
- Gerald J. Higgins (1909–1996), U.S. Army major general
- Jack Higgins (RAF officer) (1875–1948), British Army Royal Flying Corps general
- Thomas Higgins (RAF officer) (1880–1953), British Army Royal Flying Corps general

== See also ==
- Attorney General Higgins (disambiguation)
