= Donald Higgins =

Canadian academic

Donald Higgins (1943–1989) was a Canadian academic specialising in Canadian local and urban politics. He was a professor at Saint Mary's University from 1973 until his death in 1989. He co-founded the Gorsebrook Research Institute. His 1977 book Urban Canada, Its Government and Politics has been described as "a breakthrough for its appreciation of the politics of decision-making at city hall".

== Life ==
He lived in Halifax, Nova Scotia.

== Bibliography ==
- Urban Canada, Its Government and Politics (1977)
- Local and Urban Politics in Canada (1986)
- "The Processes of Reorganizing Local Government in Canada", Canadian Journal of Political Science, Vol. 19, No. 2 (Jun., 1986), pp. 219–242
