= Arthur Higgins (rugby league) =

English rugby league footballer

Personal information
- Full name: Arthur Higgins
- Born: Yorkshire, England
- Died: 1915

Playing information
- Position: Fullback
Club
Years	Team	Pld	T	G	FG	P
≤1915–≥15	Featherstone Rovers

Arthur Higgins was a semi-professional rugby league footballer who played in the 1910s. He played at club level for Featherstone Rovers, as a fullback.

== Testimonial match ==
Higgins's benefit season at Featherstone Rovers, following the loss of his right arm, and two fingers off his left hand in an accident in a Snydale Colliery (pit), took place during the 1914–15 season.

== Colliery accident ==
The coroner's inquest of March 1915 found that while repairing mineshaft brickwork from a special cradle at Snydale Colliery, Arthur Higgins and Henry Radford (a shaftman, and joiner, aged 62) were crushed. As they were using a cradle, the mine manager; Arthur Simpkin stated that the over-winding gear could not be used, the use of temporary safety location marks on the winding indicator was confirmed by the mining company director; Mr Hargreaves, and that despite the emergency-stop signaling by banksman; David Precious (of Snydale), momentary forgetfulness of the winding engineman; Noah Guest, who momentarily believed he was winding from much lower-level of the shaft at his usual position at Haigh Moor seam, resulted in the cradle crashing in to the headgear, the jury returned a verdict of accidental death, the coroner agreed with the jury that an act criminal negligence had not been committed by Noah Guest, who was of good character, and had never before made a mistake. Fifteen minutes after his arrival at Clayton Hospital, Wakefield, Radford, who was badly crushed, with many broken bones, was pronounced dead by the house surgeon Ida Guillaume (1876-1929). Higgins' right arm was so badly injured it had to be amputated, and he also lost two fingers from his left hand.
