= George Frank Higgins =

American painter

George Frank Higgins (1850–1884) was an American painter from Boston, Massachusetts. His work is in the collections of the Eustis Estate and the Perlman Teaching Museum at Carleton College.
