= Michael Farn =

English ice hockey player

- Born: 23 June 1988 (age 36); Durham, England
- Height: 6 ft 1 in (185 cm)
- Weight: 185 lb (84 kg; 13 st 3 lb)
- Position: Defense
- Shoots: Left
- EPIHL team Former teams: Milton Keynes Lightning; Swindon Wildcats
- Playing career: 2003–present

Michael Farn (born 23 February 1988 in Durham) is an English ice hockey player currently playing for Milton Keynes Lightning of the English Premier Ice Hockey League.

== Career ==
He began his career in 2003 with the Billingham Bombers of the ENL where he stayed until 2005. After a year away from ice hockey he signed for the Swindon Wildcats in the EPL. In summer 2009, Nick Poole signed Michael to his Milton Keynes Lightning squad after 2 impressive seasons at Swindon. In 09/10 Michael won the EPL title and re-signed with the team at the end of the 2011/2012 season.

== International career ==
Between 2005 and 2006 Farn represented the Great Britain National Team at both the Under 18 & Under 20 World Junior Championships. 2012-2013 Plays as a defender for Milton Keynes Lightning Current Stats Game Played 8 Goals 1 Assists 2 Total Points ( Goal = 1 Point + Assist = 1 Pont) 3 Penalty Minutes 8
