= Beda Higgins =

Poet and short story writer

Beda Higgins is an Irish poet and writer who lives in Newcastle upon Tyne, Tyne and Wear.

== Biography ==
Higgins works as a Psychiatric and General Nurse; she completed a masters in creative writing from Northumbria University in 2000. In her career as a nurse, she has been awarded the Queen's Nursing Institute Awards for her work using creative writing with patients. She is also a poet and short story writer who has won the Northern Writers' Awards on multiple occasions as well as the Geoff Stevens Memorial Prize. Her work is published in anthologies as well as two collections of short stories. In 2021 her work was shortlisted for the Pigott Poetry Prize.

== Publications ==
=== As sole author ===
- Higgins, Beda (2020). Ourselves. Indigo Dreams Publishing. ISBN 978-1-912876-42-6.
- Higgins, Beda (2014). Little Crackers: Tales from the edge. Saraband Press. ISBN 978-1-908643-68-1.
- Higgins, Beda (2011). Chameleon. Cullercoats: Iron Press. ISBN 978-0-9565725-0-9. Collection of short stories.

=== Anthologies and collections: prose and poetry ===
- 2021 THE CULTURAL AFTERLIFE OF RUINS National Museums NI
- 2020 THESE ARE THE HANDS Fair Acre Press ISBN 978-1-911048-40-4
- 2018 THE HIPPOCRATES PRIZE ISBN 978-0-9935911-2-9
- 2018 POEMS FOR THE NHS The Onslaught press ISBN 978-1-912111-74-9
- 2018 POEMS FOR GRENFELL The Onslaught press ISBN 978-1-912111-55-8
- 2016 COLD IRON Ghost stories Iron Press ISBN 978-0-9931245-8-7
- 2013 ROOT Iron Press ISBN 978-0-9565725-5-4
- 2010 BOOK OF TEN. Zebra publishing ISBN 978-0-9563887-0-4
- 2009 THE GRIST ANTHOLOGY OF NEW WRITING. ISBN 978-0-9563099-0-7
- 2006 ON NEW STREET. Biscuit Publishing ISBN 1-903914-28-0
- 2005 THE POETRY CURE. Bloodaxe Books ISBN 1-85224-690-1
- 2005 FOR THE KIDS. Biscuit Publishing ISBN 1-903914-24-8
- 2002 ADRIFT FROM BELIZE TO HAVANA. Biscuit Publishing ISBN 1-903914-07-8
- 2001 BISCUIT POETRY ANTHOLOGY. ISBN 1-903914-03-5

=== Articles in journals and magazines ===
- 2022 Arts Ireland: A nurse bears witness http://www.artsandhealth.ie/perspectives/ourselves-a-nurse-poet-bears-witness/
- 2021 Intima Journal of narrative medicine A LIFE
- 2017 Mslexia Magazine EAN 977-1473-939-03-6 ISSN 1473-9399
- 2009 Mslexia Magazine first prize winner story EAN 977-1473-939-01-2 ISSN 1473-9399
- 2003 Mslexia Magazine EAN 977-1473-939-00-5 ISSN 1473-9399
- 2001 Mslexia Magazine ISSN 1473-9399

Multiple articles and opinion pieces published in Independent Nurse.

== Awards ==
- 2019 VS Pritchett short story prize longlist
- 2018 Hippocrates Poetry Award commendation
- 2016 Northern Writer New Fiction Bursary
- 2015 Edgehill Prize longlist
- 2015 Frank O’Connor Prize longlist
- 2012 Luke Bitmead Novel Award shortlist
- 2012 Edgehill Prize longlist
- 2011 Read Regional Recommendation
- 2010 Northern Writer Award
- 2010 Cinnamon Press novel Award shortlist
- 2009 winner Mslexia short story competition
- 2007 Residential Prize winner Biscuit Publishing
- 2004 Northern Promise Award
- 2004 Novel shortlisted Lit Idol national competition

== Projects ==
- 2022 Speaker at Sunderland Symposium: Humanities in Medicine
- 2016–2020 BBC 2 500 words children’s competition Judge
- 2013 Writing mentor for New Writing North Cuckoo project
- 2010 Art’s council representative Toronto short story conference
- 2010 National Short Story Day commissioned story ‘Cinderella’ broadcast
- 2008 Queens Nursing Institute Award Creative Writing as a therapeutic tool
- 2007 Writing mentor regeneration project/New Writing North 2007
- 2006 Writing mentor Creative centre/New Writing North 2006

Regular contributor to Independent Nurse (journal for professional nurses)
