= Higginson Island =

Island in the Northern Territory, Australia

Coordinates: 12°03′54″S 136°51′33″E

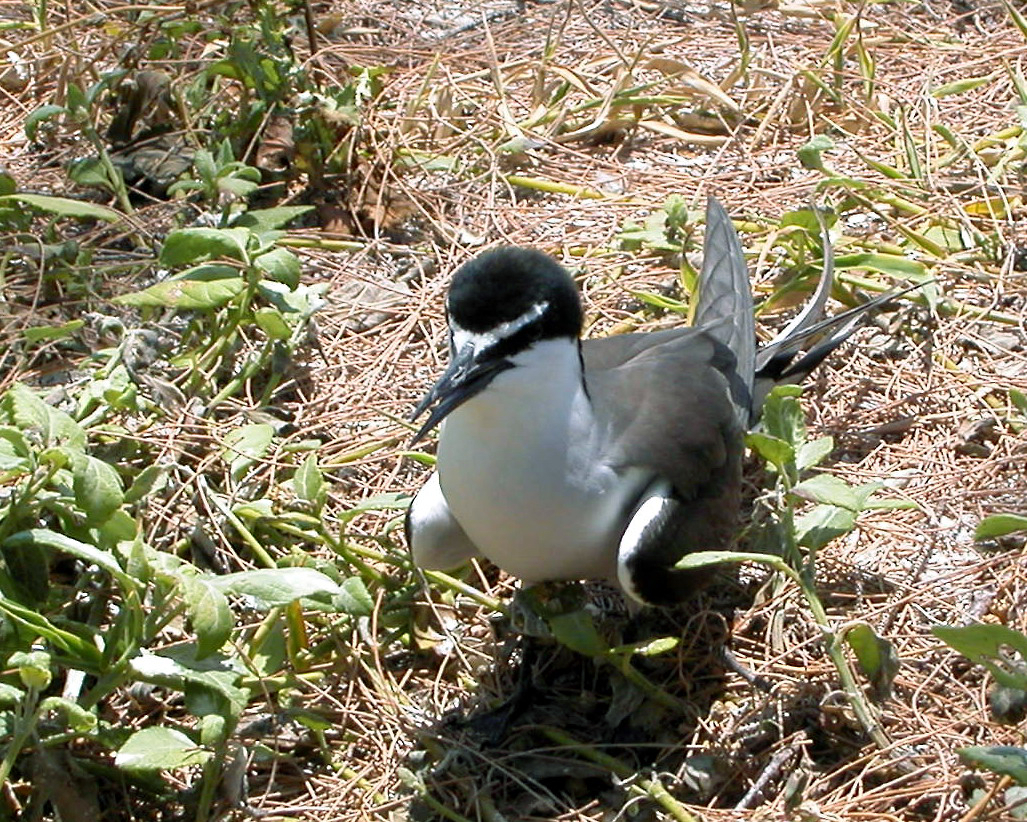
The island is an important breeding site for bridled terns

Higginson Island is a small island in the Arafura Sea lying off the north-eastern coast of Arnhem Land, in the Northern Territory of Australia. It is one of the East Bremer Islets, lying to the north and east of the much larger Bremer Island.

== Birds ==
The island has been identified by BirdLife International as an Important Bird Area (IBA) because it supports globally significant numbers of bridled (up to 10,000 individuals) and roseate terns (up to 30,000). The 9 ha IBA includes the other East Bremer Islets where the roseate tern colony sometimes relocates, and where large numbers of bridled terns nest regularly. There are also up to 10,000 nesting crested terns and up to 300 nesting common noddies, for which the IBA is the only known breeding site in the Northern Territory, as well as some nesting silver gulls. Tern eggs are frequently harvested by the Aboriginal traditional owners of the islands.
