= Jack Huggins =

English footballer

Personal information
- Full name: John Warwick Huggins
- Date of birth: 2 June 1886
- Place of birth: Crosby Ravensworth, England
- Date of death: 26 April 1915 (aged 28)
- Place of death: near Saint-Julien, Belgium
- Position: Outside left

Senior career*
Years	Team	Apps	(Gls)
- Bede College
–1906	Leadgate Park		
1906–1908	Sunderland	14	(2)
1908–1909	Reading	31	(6)
1909	Sunderland	0	(0)
- Durham City
- Wingate
- * Club domestic league appearances and goals

John Warwick Huggins (2 June 1886 – 26 April 1915) was an English professional footballer who played in the Football League for Sunderland as an outside left. He also played in the Southern League for Reading.

== Personal life ==
Huggins attended St. James' National School, Whitehaven and Bede College, Durham. He later worked as a teacher and while a footballer with Reading, he taught at Swansea Road School. In May 1909, he was appointed a certified assistant at Wheatley Hill Boys Secondary School.

A pre-war member of the Bede College company in the Durham Light Infantry, Huggins re-enlisted as a private in the regiment soon after Britain's entry into the First World War. He was killed on or near Gravenstafel Ridge during the Second Battle of Ypres on 25–26 April 1915. After being initially buried by the Germans in a cemetery in Wallemolen, Belgium, Huggins' remains were moved to Perth (China Wall) Cemetery after the war.

== Career statistics ==
Appearances and goals by club, season and competition
Club	Season	League			FA Cup		Total	
Club	Season	Division	Apps	Goals	Apps	Goals	Apps	Goals
Sunderland	1906–07	First Division	7	2	0	0	7	2
Sunderland	1907–08	First Division	7	0	0	0	7	0
Sunderland	Total		14	2	0	0	14	2
Reading	1908–09	Southern League First Division	31	6	3	0	34	6
Career total			45	8	3	0	48	8
