= Thomas Higginson (soldier) =

Irish-born Canadian soldier, official and politician

Lieutenant-Colonel Thomas Higginson (January 9, 1794 – January 22, 1884) was an Irish-born soldier, civic official and politician in Ontario, Canada.

== Overview ==
The son of Boyd Higginson and Jane Crawford, he was born in County Antrim and came to Canada in 1819 with his three older brothers, settling in Hawkesbury. In the same year, before leaving Ireland, he had married Nancy Agnes Park.

Thomas Higginson contributed to social, educational and spiritual development of Vankleek Hill, Ontario and district during the early stages of community formation. He was the second postmaster of Vankleek Hill; the first was Neil Stewart who served when the post office was established in 1827. Neil Stewart and Thomas Higginson were the first to represent the district of West Hawkesbury c. 1844 on the newly established district council. He was Superintendent of Schools for Prescott and Russell for many years, an Agent for the Bank of Upper Canada for the transmission of the proceeds of sales of public lands, and a member of the County Council.

Lieutenant-Colonel Higginson was founder of the Mechanics' Institute in Vankleek Hill in 1857 and its first president. According to diary entries by Thomas Tweed Higginson, for March 30, 1859, “Uncle Thomas preparing a lecture to be delivered before the Mechanic’s Institute: ‘The Change of the Earth’s Surface’.”

In 1856 St. John’s Anglican Church was completed on land owned by Lieutenant-Colonel Thomas Higginson. Before this, Lieutenant-Colonel Higginson was involved in establishing a Sunday School that served Vankleek Hill.

The first issue of the weekly news publication The Economist in Vankleek Hill in 1858 was edited by Rupert Mearse Wells (later Speaker of the Provincial Legislature) and contained articles and poetry by Lieutenant-Colonel Higginson.

== The Higginson Tower ==
The Higginson Tower is close to St. John the Apostle Anglican Church (the church on the hill along Highway 34 as you enter Vankleek Hill from the north end). The ruins were once near the home of Lieutenant-Colonel Thomas Higginson, who built it in 1832. William Higginson, Thomas' son, added the upper portion to create a conservatory and also built the red brick house nearby.

The Higginson Tower is symbolic of the evolution of 19th century teaching, learning and civic duty in Vankleek Hill and district. It also represents the many positive contributions made by Lieutenant-Colonel Thomas Higginson. The Higginson Tower was constructed by Thomas Higginson as a windmill in 1832 to serve in the grinding of wheat and corn so as to further the commercial development of Vankleek Hill and the immediate district. When this project failed due to lack of consistent wind power, Mr. Thomas Higginson, (commissioned Lieutenant-Colonel of the Prescott Regiment on April 23, 1839) transformed the windmill into the first private observatory in Eastern Ontario.

In 1866 in answer to a government call to defend against the Fenian raids, Lieutenant-Colonel Higginson’s Prescott militia in Vankleek Hill were instructed on March 9, 1866 to proceed to Cornwall - in anticipation of a Fenian Raid. It is suggested that the Higginson Tower carried out a defensive role during the Fenian Raids as it later carried the term of “look-out” tower.
