= Adam Higgins =

American contemporary painter (born 1989)

Adam Robert Higgins (born 1989) is an American contemporary painter. His work reinterprets the tradition of still life painting. Higgins creates paintings that shift between representation and abstraction, drawing upon the history of painting while introducing humor and play into the genre. He lives in Los Angeles.

== Early life and education ==
Higgins was born in 1989, in Huntington Beach, California. He received a Bachelor of Fine Arts (BFA) degree from the University of Memphis in 2012, and a Master of Fine Arts (MFA) degree in painting and printmaking from Yale University in 2018.

== Career and work ==
His subjects—ranging from food to plants and other commonplace objects—are painted in such a way that representation can dissolve into abstraction achieved through the textural qualities of paint.

Critics have observed that Higgins’ work complicates the conventions of still life while engaging broader questions about perception and abstraction. Writing in Artforum, Suzanne Hudson noted how his paintings destabilize expectations of still life through shifts in scale, surface, and focus. Reviews in Artillery and The Brooklyn Rail have highlighted his use of humor and repetition, as well as his positioning within the historical legacy of still life painting.

== Solo exhibitions ==
- 2022: Lonesome, Tops Gallery, Memphis, Tennessee, US
- 2023: My Salad Years: La Suite, Chris Sharp Gallery at Place des Vosges, Paris, France
