= James Higginson (cricketer) =

English cricketer

Cricket information
- Batting: Right-handed
- Bowling: Right-arm fast

Career statistics
Competition	First-class
Matches	1
Runs scored	0
Batting average	–
100s/50s	0/0
Top score	0*
Balls bowled	24
Wickets	0
Bowling average	–
5 wickets in innings	–
10 wickets in match	–
Best bowling	–
Catches/stumpings	0/–
- Source: Cricinfo, 7 November 2022

James G Higginson (January 1885 - September 1940) was an English first-class cricketer who played one first-class game for Worcestershire against Somerset at Amblecote in 1912. Batting at number eleven, he scored no runs in his only innings (but maintained an infinite batting average on account of remaining not out), and took no wickets or catches.

Baker was born in Worcester, and died in Wolverhampton aged 55.
