= Albert Brydges Farn =

British amateur entomologist

Albert Brydges Farn (9 October 1841 – 1921) was a British amateur entomologist, chiefly remembered nowadays for a letter he wrote on 1878 to Charles Darwin describing industrial melanism in the annulet moth (Charissa obscurata) and suggesting natural selection as the process involved in pale forms getting rarer.

Farn was born at Hackney, son of a solicitor. Though he began medical training he appears to have given it up on inheriting a large legacy, and devoted himself to pleasure. He was a noted shot, once famously bagging 30 snipe with 30 shots, as well a practical joker and an excellent billiard player; at the same time he was quick to take offence and never forgot any perceived slight. He worked as an inspector of vaccine at Dartford, until 1906, when he retired to Hereford. In 1912 he moved to Doward Cottage, at Ganarew near Monmouth, largely to study the comma butterfly, which was at that time rare in England. He had married and had a son and daughter but the marriage failed and he later lived with a common-law wife. He died on 31 October 1921 after failing to recover from an operation, and is buried at Ganarew.

Farn was a respected entomologist. In 1880 he revised and extended The Insect Hunter's Companion, and in 1890 he was elected a fellow of the Entomological Society. The extensive collection of Lepidoptera which he had amassed was dispersed after his death.
