= Carlisle W. Higgins =

American judge

Associate Justice of the North Carolina Supreme Court
- In office 1954–1974

Member of the North Carolina Senate
- In office 1929–1930

Member of the North Carolina House of Representatives
- In office 1925–1926

Personal details
- Born: Carlisle Wallace Higgins; October 17, 1889 Alleghany County, North Carolina, U.S.
- Died: October 9, 1980 (aged 90)
- Profession: Attorney, jurist

Military service
- Allegiance: United States
- Branch/service: United States Army
- Battles/wars: World War I

Carlisle Wallace Higgins (October 17, 1889 – October 9, 1980) was a North Carolina attorney and jurist. He was a native of Alleghany County, North Carolina.

Higgins served in both houses of the North Carolina General Assembly before being appointed U.S. Attorney for the Middle District of North Carolina by President Franklin D. Roosevelt (1934–1947). In 1946 he became a prosecutor for the war crimes trials in Japan. Higgins later served as an associate justice of the North Carolina Supreme Court (1954–1974). He is among the longest-serving justices in the history of the North Carolina Supreme Court. Upon his retirement from the Court, he joined the law firm of Tharrington Smith, co-founded by his former law clerk, Wade Smith. He remained with the Raleigh-based firm until his death in 1980.

Year	Career Highlights
1914	Joined Governor Rufus A. Doughton as a lawyer, Served in US Army in WWI
1925–26	North Carolina House of Representatives
1929–30	North Carolina Senate
1930	Solicitor of the old 11th Judicial District composed of Ashe, Alleghany, Surry, Forsyth, Rockingham, and Caswell Counties
1934–47	US Attorney for the Middle District of North Carolina residing in Greensboro
1945–47	Assistant Chief Prosecutor for the Allied Powers in the prosecution of General Tojo
1947	Private law practice in Winston-Salem, North Carolina
1952	Managed the successful campaign of his law classmate, William B. Umstead, for Governor
1954	Appointed Democratic National Committeeman
1954–74	Appointed Associate Justice of North Carolina Supreme Court
