= Recorder: The Marion Stokes Project =

- Directed by: Matt Wolf
- Produced by: Kyle Martin; Andrew Kortschak; Walter Kortschak
- Cinematography: Chris Dapkins; Matt Mitchell
- Edited by: Keiko Deguchi
- Music by: Owen Pallett
- Release dates: April 25, 2019 (Tribeca); November 15, 2019 (USA)
- Running time: 87 minutes
- Country: United States
- Language: English
- Box office: $54,566

Recorder: The Marion Stokes Project is a 2019 American documentary film directed by Matt Wolf about Marion Stokes and the television news archive she created.

== Summary ==
Stokes captured 840,000 hours of news footage over the course of 35 years, from 1977 until her death in 2012; the VHS and Betamax video recordings were donated to the Internet Archive.

The Iran hostage crisis, which lasted from 1979 to 1981, made Stokes decide to make her project a round-the-clock job due to its continuous development as it happened.

== Release and reception ==
The film premiered at the 2019 Tribeca Film Festival and was released and distributed by Zeitgeist Films in association with Kino Lorber. It was also submitted for Oscar consideration. A book featuring imagery compiled by Wolf from more than seven hundred hours of Stokes's tapes, titled Input, was published in Fall of 2023.

The film has a 95% rating on Rotten Tomatoes. The site's critical consensus reads, "Recorder: The Marion Stokes Story uses one person's singular quest to illuminate the blurred line between brilliance and obsession."

=== Home media ===
The DVD and Blu-ray were released on March 10, 2020.

A VHS edition of the documentary was released by Lunchmeat VHS in 2023.

== See also ==
- Input – Public-access television talk show featured in the film, Stokes was a co-producer of the show before she started her recording project
- Sandy Hook shooting – The last ever event recorded by Stokes, news coverage of the shooting was aired on the day she died (December 14, 2012)
