= Jody Lee Lipes =

American cinematographer and filmmaker (born 1982)

- Born: January 18, 1982 (age 44); Doylestown, Pennsylvania
- Education: New York University
- Years active: 2003–present

Jody Lee Lipes (born January 18, 1982) is an American cinematographer and filmmaker.

== Life and career ==
A native of Doylestown, Pennsylvania, Lipes attended New York University, where he studied film.

He worked extensively on short films before serving as cinematographer on Afterschool (2008).

After working with Lena Dunham in Tiny Furniture (2010), Lipes would collaborate with her again as cinematographer and director for some episodes of her HBO series Girls.

Lipes worked as cinematographer for Kenneth Lonergan's drama Manchester by the Sea (2016), which he shot digitally.

As a director, Lipes helmed a documentary on the NY Export Opus Jazz ballet, which had a screening at the annual South by Southwest festival, and the documentary Ballet 422, which screened at the 2014 Tribeca Film Festival.

Lipes became a member of the American Society of Cinematographers (ASC) in 2021.

== Filmography ==
=== Cinematographer ===
==== Film ====
| Year | Title | Director | Notes |
|---|---|---|---|
| 2008 | Afterschool | Antonio Campos | |
| 2010 | Tiny Furniture | Lena Dunham | |
| 2010 | Two Gates of Sleep | Alistair Banks Griffin | |
| 2011 | Martha Marcy May Marlene | Sean Durkin | |
| 2013 | Bluebird | Lance Edmands | Also credited as second unit director |
| 2015 | Trainwreck | Judd Apatow | |
| 2016 | Manchester by the Sea | Kenneth Lonergan | |
| 2019 | A Beautiful Day in the Neighborhood | Marielle Heller | |
| 2022 | The Good Nurse | Tobias Lindholm | |
| 2023 | Earth Mama | Savanah Leaf | |

==== Television ====
| Year | Title | Director | Notes |
|---|---|---|---|
| 2007 | We Are Internet Millionaires | Dan Gregor; Doug Mand; Adam Pally | TV shorts |
| 2007 | Sell Outs | Dan Gregor; Doug Mand; Adam Pally | TV shorts |
| 2007-2008 | The Whitest Kids U' Know | Trevor Moore; Zach Cregger; Dave Diomedi | 20 episodes |
| 2012 | Girls | Lena Dunham; Richard Shepard | 7 episodes |
| 2013 | The Sonnet Project | R Jameson Smith | Episode "Sonnet #14" |
| 2017 | The Sinner | Antonio Campos | Episode "Part I" |
| 2018 | Drew Michael | Jerrod Carmichael | TV special |
| 2020 | I Know This Much Is True | Derek Cianfrance | Miniseries |
| 2023 | Dead Ringers | Sean Durkin | 2 episodes |
| 2024 | The Listeners | Janicza Bravo | All 4 episodes |

==== Documentary works ====
Film

| Year | Title | Director | Notes |
|---|---|---|---|
| 2008 | Wild Combination: A Portrait of Arthur Russell | Matt Wolf | |
| 2009 | Brock Enright: Good Times Will Never Be The Same | Himself | |
| 2010 | N.Y. Export: Opus Jazz | Himself | |
| 2012 | Brute Force | Ben Steinbauer | |
| 2014 | The Great Invisible | Magaret Brown | With Jeff Peixoto and Adam Stone |
| 2014 | Ballet 422 | Himself | With Nick Bentgen |

Television

| Year | Title | Director | Notes |
|---|---|---|---|
| 2009 | High Line Stories | Matt Wolf | |
| 2013 | Picasso Baby: A Performance Art Film | Mark Romanek | TV short |
| 2015 | Independent Lens | Margaret Brown | Episode "The Great Invisible" |
| 2025 | Number One on the Call Sheet | Shola Lynch | Episode "Black Leading Women in Hollywood" |

=== Director ===
Documentary film

| Year | Title | Director | Writer | Producer |
|---|---|---|---|---|
| 2009 | Brock Enright: Good Times Will Never Be The Same | Yes | Yes | Yes |
| 2010 | N.Y. Export: Opus Jazz | Yes | Yes | No |
| 2014 | Ballet 422 | Yes | No | No |

Television

| Year | Title | Episodes |
|---|---|---|
| 2012 | Girls | "Welcome to Bushwick a.k.a. The Crackcident" |
| 2012 | Girls | "Weirdos Need Girlfriends Too" |
| 2017-2018 | The Sinner | "Part IV" |
| 2017-2018 | The Sinner | "Part VI" |

== Accolades ==
| Year | Award | Category | Title | Result |
|---|---|---|---|---|
| 2010 | Independent Spirit Awards | Best Cinematography | Tiny Furniture | Nominated |
| 2023 | Primetime Emmy Awards | Outstanding Cinematography for a Limited Series | Dead Ringers | Nominated |
