= Marion Stokes =

American librarian and archivist (1929–2012)

- Stokes as a young woman
- Born: Marion Marguerite Butler; November 25, 1929; Germantown, Philadelphia, Pennsylvania, U.S.
- Died: December 14, 2012 (aged 83); Philadelphia, Pennsylvania, U.S.
- Occupations: Television producer, archivist
- Spouse(s): Melvin Metelits (separated); John Stokes Jr.
- Children: 1

Marion Marguerite Stokes (née Butler; November 25, 1929 – December 14, 2012) was an American access television producer, businesswoman, investor, civil rights demonstrator, activist, librarian, and archivist. She was especially known for recording and hoarding hundreds of thousands of hours of television news footage from 1977 until her death in 2012, a total of 35 years. She had been operating nine properties and three storage units by the time of her death. According to the Los Angeles Review of Books review of the 2019 documentary film Recorder, Stokes's massive project of recording the 24-hour news cycle "makes a compelling case for the significance of guerrilla archiving."

== Early life ==
Marion Marguerite Butler, later named Marion Marguerite Stokes, was born on November 25, 1929, in Germantown, Philadelphia. She graduated from Girls' High. As a young woman, Stokes became politically active and was involved with a number of left-wing organizations. She was courted by the Communist Party USA, who sought to develop her as a potential leader. She was the Philadelphia chair of the Fair Play for Cuba Committee and was involved in the civil rights movement, organizing five buses from Philadelphia for the March on Washington for Jobs and Freedom and participating in efforts to desegregate Girard College.

Stokes worked as a librarian for the Free Library of Philadelphia for almost 20 years. In the early 1960s, she was fired, likely due to her political activities.

In 1960, she married teacher Melvin Metelits, also a member of the Communist Party, and had a son with him. Stokes was spied on by the Federal Bureau of Investigation, and she and her husband and son attempted to flee the United States and defect to Cuba. They spent time in Mexico waiting for a Cuban visa, but were unable to obtain one. Metelits and Stokes separated in the mid-1960s when their son was four.

She was on the founding board of the National Organization for Women.

From 1967 to 1969, Stokes co-produced a Sunday morning television show in Philadelphia, Input, with her husband John. Its focus was on social justice.

== Collections ==
=== Television ===
Stokes has been called a pioneer and visionary who committed much of her life to preserving televisual history. Her primary objective was to "protect the truth" from fake news and to let people assess the archived material objectively. Some selected programs that she recorded were The Cosby Show, Divorce Court, Nightline, Star Trek, The Oprah Winfrey Show, and The Today Show.

Family outings with her husband and children were planned around the length of a VHS tape. Every six hours, when the tapes ran out, Stokes and her husband switched them out. Later in life, when she was less agile, Stokes trained a helper to do the task for her. The archives grew to about 71,000 tapes (originally erroneously reported as 140,000 in the media). VHS and Betamax tapes (up to eight hours each) stacked in her home and apartments she rented just to store them.

Stokes started the taping project because she became convinced there was a lot of detail in the news at risk of disappearing forever. Her son, Michael Metelits, told WNYC that Stokes "channeled her natural hoarding tendencies to [the] task [of creating an archive]." She began recording the news non-stop in 1979 during the Iranian hostage crisis. Some of Stokes's tape collection consisted of 24/7 coverage of Fox, MSNBC, CNN, C-SPAN, CNBC, and other networks—recorded on up to eight separate VCRs in her house. Also included are a 1984 JVC VHS deck set recording regular programs from Boston in a six-hour Extended Play format. Stokes's final recording took place on December 14, 2012, as she was dying; it captured coverage of the Sandy Hook massacre.

Stokes's collection is not the only instance of massive television footage taping, but her care in preserving the collection is unusual. Known collections of similar scale have not been as well-maintained and lack the timely and local focus.

=== Macintosh computers ===
Stokes bought many Macintosh computers. Until the time of her death, 192 of the computers remained in her possession. Stokes kept the unopened items in a climate-controlled storage garage for posterity. The collection, speculated to be one of the last of its nature remaining, sold on eBay to an anonymous buyer. Stokes invested in Apple stock with capital from her in-laws while the company was still fledgling. Later, she encouraged her already rich in-laws to invest in Apple, advice they took and profited from. Stokes then allocated part of her profits to her recording project.

=== Others ===
Stokes received half a dozen daily newspapers and 100–150 monthly periodicals, collected for half a century. She also accumulated 30,000–40,000 books. Metelits told WNYC that in the mid-1970s the family frequented bookstores to purchase $800 worth of new books. She also collected toys and dollhouses.

== Legacy ==
Stokes bequeathed the entire tape collection to her son Michael Metelits, with no instructions other than to donate it to a charity of his choice. After considering potential recipients, Metelits gave the collection to the Internet Archive one year after Stokes's death. Four shipping containers were required to move the collection to Internet Archive's headquarters in San Francisco, a move that cost her estate $16,000. It was the largest collection the Internet Archive had ever received. The organization agreed to digitize the volumes, a process expected to run fully on round-the-clock volunteers, costing $2 million and taking 20 digitizing machines several years to complete. As of 2022, the project is still incomplete, partially due to lack of funding.

A documentary about her life, Recorder: The Marion Stokes Project, was directed by Matt Wolf and premiered at the 2019 Tribeca Festival. A book featuring imagery compiled by Wolf from more than 700 hours of Stokes's tapes, titled Input, was published in the fall of 2023.

In 2024, UK's The Duke Mitchell Film Club featured the archive for their DukeFest.

== See also ==
- List of archivists
- Bob Monkhouse § Film and television archive
- Vanderbilt Television News Archive
