= Another Hayride =

2021 documentary film

- Directed by: Matt Wolf
- Produced by: Sam Bisbee; Matthew Wolf
- Narrated by: David Ault
- Edited by: Matt Wolf
- Music by: Lori Scacco
- Release date: January 16, 2021
- Country: United States

Another Hayride is a 2021 American documentary short film directed by Matt Wolf.

== Summary ==
The film, built entirely from archival footage and narrated by writer/minister David Ault, explores how controversial new age self-help guru Louise Hay drew hundreds of gay men with AIDS by teaching them self-love in 1980s Los Angeles.

== See also ==
- Safe - Todd Haynes's 1995 film similar in content
- The Oprah Winfrey Show - featured on the documentary
- Donahue - also featured on the documentary
