= Melita Maschmann =

German writer

- Born: January 10, 1918; Berlin, Kingdom of Prussia, German Empire
- Died: February 4, 2010 (aged 92); Germany
- Occupation: Memoirist
- Writing career
- Subjects: Life in the Hitler Youth, Nazism
- Notable work: Fazit: Kein Rechtfertigungsversuch

Melita Maschmann (January 10, 1918 – February 4, 2010) was a German memoirist. She achieved renown with her 1963 book Fazit: Kein Rechtfertigungsversuch (lit: "Conclusion: No Attempt at Justification") which recounted her years as a member of the Hitler Youth and a propagandist for the Nazi machine.

The book was translated into English by Geoffrey Strachan as Account Rendered: A Dossier on my Former Self, and published as an eBook in 2013 by Plunkett Lake Press.

Maschmann never married and had no children. For the last ten years of her life, she suffered from Alzheimer's disease. Maschmann's life was portrayed in the documentary Teenage (2013) where she was played by Ivy Blackshire.

Maschmann is portrayed in the stage play Here There Are Blueberries.
