= Abby Rubenfeld =

American civil rights attorney (born 1953)

- Born: 1953 (age 72–73); Oneonta, New York, U.S.
- Education: Princeton University (BA) Boston University (JD)
- Occupations: Civil rights lawyer, adjunct professor
- Spouse: Helia Rethmann
- Children: 2
- Father: Milton Rubenfeld
- Relatives: Paul Reubens (brother)

Abby Rubenfeld (born 1953) is an American civil rights attorney who practices in Nashville, Tennessee.

Rubenfeld received an A.B. with honors from Princeton University, where she was class president, and a J.D. from Boston University School of Law in 1979, where she helped create the Boston University Law Association. She was admitted to practice law in 1979.

She challenged Tennessee's "Homosexual Practices Acts" law, which criminalized sodomy. The sodomy law was overturned in 1996. In 2013, she organized a group of attorneys and plaintiffs to challenge Tennessee's ban on same-sex marriage. She filed the lawsuit that led to Tennessee's inclusion in the U.S. Supreme Court case that legalized gay marriage nationwide.

She was an adjunct professor at Vanderbilt University Law School and chair of the Individual Rights and Responsibilities section of the American Bar Association. She has served as a board member of the American Civil Liberties Union of Tennessee and the Human Rights Campaign. She was an attorney and Legal Director of Lambda Legal Defense and Education Fund, Inc.

Rubenfeld is the daughter of Milton Rubenfeld and the sister of actor Paul Reubens. She is married to Helia Rethmann, and has two daughters and a stepdaughter.
