= Milton Rubenfeld =

American aviator, one of the five founding pilots of the Israeli Air Force

- מילטון רובנפלד
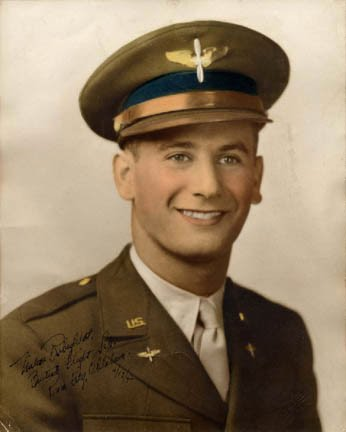
- Rubenfeld as a member of the USAAF in 1942
- Born: September 13, 1919; Peekskill, New York, U.S.
- Died: February 21, 2004 (aged 84); Sarasota, Florida, U.S.
- Spouse: Judy Rosen
- Children: 3, Including Paul and Abby
- Military career
- Allegiance: United States; Israel
- Branch: Royal Air Force; United States Army Air Forces; Israeli Air Force
- Service years: 1939–1948
- Rank: Flight Officer
- Nicknames: Ruby; Milt; Cy
- Awards: World War II Victory Medal

Milton Rubenfeld (Hebrew: מילטון רובנפלד; September 13, 1919 – February 21, 2004) was an American pilot who flew for the Royal Air Force and U.S. Army during World War II, later becoming one of the five founding pilots of the Israeli Air Force in the 1948 Arab–Israeli War. It is widely believed that Rubenfeld, the other four volunteer pilots, and the other machalniks changed the course of the 1948 Arab–Israeli War. He was injured and returned to the United States, and settled in New York state, where he married and owned a local business with his wife, Judy. Later, he moved his family to Sarasota, Florida, where he and his wife owned another successful business until he retired. He died in 2004. He was the father of actor/comedian Paul Reubens, who was known for creating and portraying the character Pee-wee Herman.

== Early life ==
Rubenfeld was born in Peekskill, New York, the fourth of six children of Orthodox Jewish parents, Gussie (née Yormark, 1891–1958) and Louis Rubenfeld (1884–1937). His parents were both immigrants from Polish Galicia. Rubenfeld was an Eagle Scout, a student in New York University and the University of New Mexico (where he also hunted rattlesnakes), and taught aerobatics.

When World War II broke out in Europe, he wanted to fly combat missions; however, the United States was not yet in the war. Rubenfeld decided to fly with the Royal Air Force in England, with the 420 Squadron. When the United States declared war on Germany, Rubenfeld signed on as a pilot with the U.S. Army. He flew as a ferry pilot for the Air Transport Command.

== Flying for Israel ==
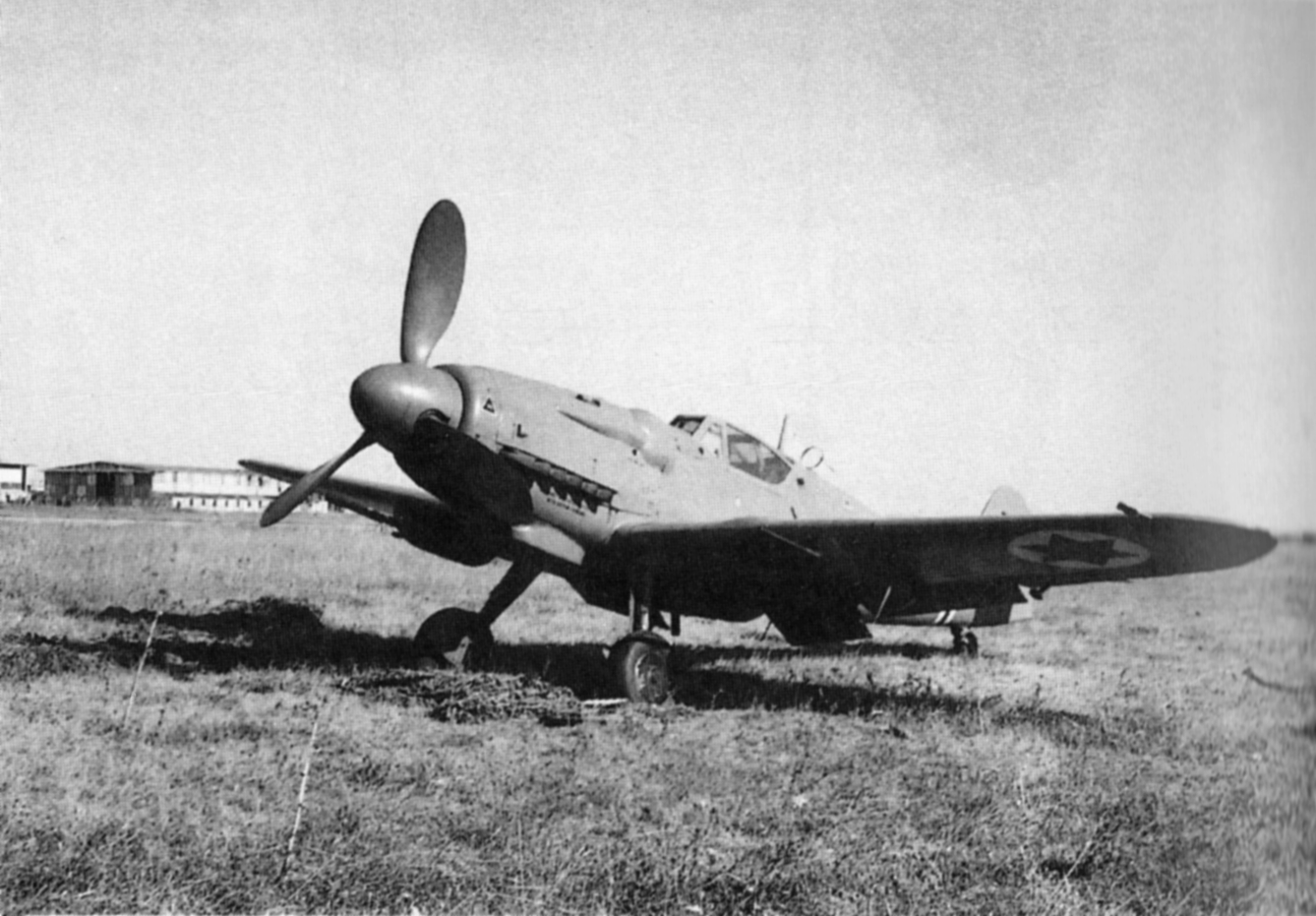
Israeli Avia S-199 in 1948

On the ground the military situation was critical, and in the air the Egyptian air force was king of the skies.... It could do literally anything it wanted. Its Dakotas and Spitfires bombed Tel Aviv and only encountered sporadic anti-aircraft fire.

Of course there was no time to consider trifles, such as the fact that [the Avia S-199's] had never taken off, or even been tested in flight, their parts had not been checked, no one knew whether their systems functioned or if their machine-guns fired. No one was sure that their bombs would drop—or that their wings wouldn't. These questions had to be shoved aside.... We swung out to sea ... and swooped towards the Egyptian column. The sight took my breath away.... [Not much] stood between it and Tel Aviv.... I must confess I had a profound sense of fulfilling a great mission.

— Ezer Weizman, On eagles' wings

In February 1948, the Haganah set up an agency in the United States headed by Hyman Shechtman (later, Shamir) assisted by Al Schwimmer, to recruit U.S. combat air veterans, both aircrew and ground crew, for the Haganah's "Air Service". Knowing of Rubenfeld's combat experience, Shamir approached him in early 1948 and asked him if he wanted to fly for the new state of Israel. Rubenfeld — "a small, swarthy former USAF pilot, so cocky he seemed to swagger even while sitting down"—agreed.

In early 1948, Rubenfeld flew transport planes on a few missions to and from Israel, until early May, when he reported to České Budějovice, in Czechoslovakia, where he and the other pilots began training on the Avia S-199, a Czech airplane roughly based on the German Messerschmitt Bf 109. After evaluating the results of that training, it became clear to the Israeli instructors that only those pilots with previous combat pilot experience—Rubenfeld, Modi Alon, Ezer Weizman, Lou Lenart, and Eddie Cohen—were capable of handling the S-199, at least initially. (Rubenfeld and Lenart were the two U.S. citizens in this group.) These five pilots finished the course in Czechoslovakia and, on May 20, 1948, reported to their base in Ekron Air Base (now Tel Nof Airbase) in Israel. As of May 14, 1948—Israel's independence day—these five pilots, along with four S-199s, constituted the entire Israeli Air Force.

The existence of the tiny air force had been kept secret from the Arab forces that had entered Israel following its declaration of independence. Israel's leaders knew that the first time they made the existence of their four planes known, their targets should be critical ones. The initial plan was to attack a squadron of Egyptian Spitfires and C-47 Dakotas at El Arish, a base on the northern coast of the Sinai. That order was changed "at the last minute" due to the increasing danger of a direct ground attack on Tel Aviv. The four fighters were ordered to bomb and strafe the Egyptian armored column that was advancing on Tel Aviv.

Since there were five pilots and only four airplanes, Rubenfeld remained behind for the first mission on May 29, 1948. One pilot was lost on that mission: South African Eddie Cohen. It's not known whether he was shot down or had technical difficulties.

Also on that mission, Lenart's and Weizman's cannons had both jammed. In fact, there were many inherent design and performance defects with the Avia S-199, including a defect that rendered the cowl guns unsynchronized with the propeller, causing bullet damage to the propeller (which the first group of pilots luckily did not experience). The S-199 also had a tendency to ground loop, which Modi Alon's airplane did upon landing, rendering it unflyable for a time. Weizman later commented that the main problem with the S-199 was "the stress on the pilot. So much went wrong with the aircraft, it was nerve-wracking just climbing into one."

Rubenfeld's opinion of the Avia S-199, expressed in an interview nearly fifty years later: "It wasn't a very nice airplane."

However, the first mission on May 29, 1948 was not a failure. The commander of the Egyptian ground forces was evidently shaken by the unexpected encounter with Israeli fighters: he ordered his troops to hold their position and advised Cairo that he was not advancing toward Tel Aviv. "It was as close as the Egyptians would ever come to Tel Aviv. With one raid, the air force had potentially altered the course of the war."

== Rubenfeld Mission, 30 May 1948 ==
To keep up the pressure on the Arab forces, the second sortie launched approximately 12 hours after the first mission returned. At 0530 on 30 May 1948, Milt Rubenfeld (Red 2) and Ezer Weizman (Red 1) launched in the only two remaining airworthy airplanes. Their mission was to attack positions around Tulkarm, on the eastern front.

Rubenfeld was debriefed on his return. The notes of the person who debriefed him were saved by the Israel Defense Forces (see sidebar)

Took off .... supposed to rendezvous with Wheizman (Red 1), circled our drome for aprox. [sic] 10' looking for Red 1, could not find him and took off for target area headed for coast, followed coast up to Natanya, (150 feet, visibility very poor)... made run to target (E to SW) opened fire at 400 yards at Danaba (0 feet) made good hits on important houses (one of them a tower) and dropped one bomb from about 100 feet on Danaba, opened fire with MG and Cannons on Tulkarm Police Station and dropped the second bomb on Police St... West of Tulkarm (+Rd) made a 90 degree turn to N attacked 4 tanks (light British (Alexander)) registered hits (tracer) on all 4 of them (0 distance). No flack until hit right over tanks (50 yards) by 2 cannon shells one in left wing and 1 in belly. Went out of control (25 feet) and got a/c under control after being on my back. left wing crumpled up. Climbed above clouds. all instruments gone ... aprox over Kafr El Laba saw Spit a/c for the 1 time.... Noticed that Spit unidentified a/c made steep turn to left pointing his nose directly at me just over cloud base. I made steep turn towards him opened at aprox 300 yards saw two big chunks (like big chairs) falling out of a/c.... I headed for coast at (295 degrees) saw enemy a/c smoke trailing out of it heading for coast. By then I was on fire, left wing smoky. Wanted to get through emergency hatch but had difficulties [this was another design flaw of the S-199].... I finally managed to get out. (1200 feet) landed in water swam ashore (kibutz people firing all the time).... Once ashore the kibutz people helped me taking me to hospital (Natanya) interviewed by Haganah when in kibutz.... Was sent back from Hospital by taxi to T.A. [Tel Aviv]. Haganah was very pleased with raid...

— Transcript of Rubenfeld Debrief, 5-30-48

After Rubenfeld's fighter was hit, he managed to fly it to Israeli territory, bailing out at 1200 feet over the Mediterranean Sea near the moshav of Kfar Vitkin. His parachute did not fully open before he hit the water several miles offshore, and he suffered three broken ribs, several cuts, and an injury to his groin. He began to swim to shore, but gave up after "a couple of hours". He stood up, "and the water was only up to my knees. I'd been swimming for hours in water I could have stood up in at anytime. I didn't realize it because I was so far out. The farmers .... were shooting at me as I was coming in out of the water. They thought I was an Arab pilot."

The problem for Rubenfeld was that the Israeli Air Force had not only been a secret to the Egyptians—it had also been a secret to Israeli citizens. Thus, the moshavniks of Kfar Vitkin assumed that Rubenfeld was an Arab pilot. Rubenfeld knew no Hebrew, and knew very little Yiddish, so in order to convince them he was Jewish, he reportedly shouted the only thing he could remember: "Shabbos, gefilte fisch! Shabbos, gefilte fisch!"

Despite its being widely reported, this version of events might have been a legend that simply "went viral" in its day. In an interview nearly 50 years later, Rubenfeld said that he couldn't remember what he was shouting, but that the moshavniks were indeed shooting at him. It is logical to assume that he said something to them to convince them not to hurt him, but it might have been less (or more) colorful than what was reported.

=== Impact on the war ===
As noted, the actions of Rubenfeld and the other four initial pilots had a profound effect on the conduct of the war. The enemy was evidently so surprised by the presence of the little air force, that they stopped their advance toward Tel Aviv, Israel, which bought time for the rest of Israel's forces (which had a large contingent of foreign fighters, or machalniks) to become better organized.

In addition, Milt Rubenfeld's mission had an immediate benefit for the moshavniks of Kfar Vitkin, Israel. They were able to salvage and mount the guns from Rubenfeld's downed fighter, which they used for their defense.

== Personal life ==
Rubenfeld returned to the United States soon after this mission, to receive follow-up medical care. He married a few years later; he and his wife, Judy (Rosen), had three children, with his family living first in Oneonta, New York, then Sarasota, Florida. Forty years after his mission, Milt and Judy were cast as "atmosphere characters" (extras) in their son Paul Reubens' 1988 movie, Big Top Pee-wee.

Milt Rubenfeld died in Sarasota on February 21, 2004, at the age of 84.
