= Matt Wolf (filmmaker) =

American film director

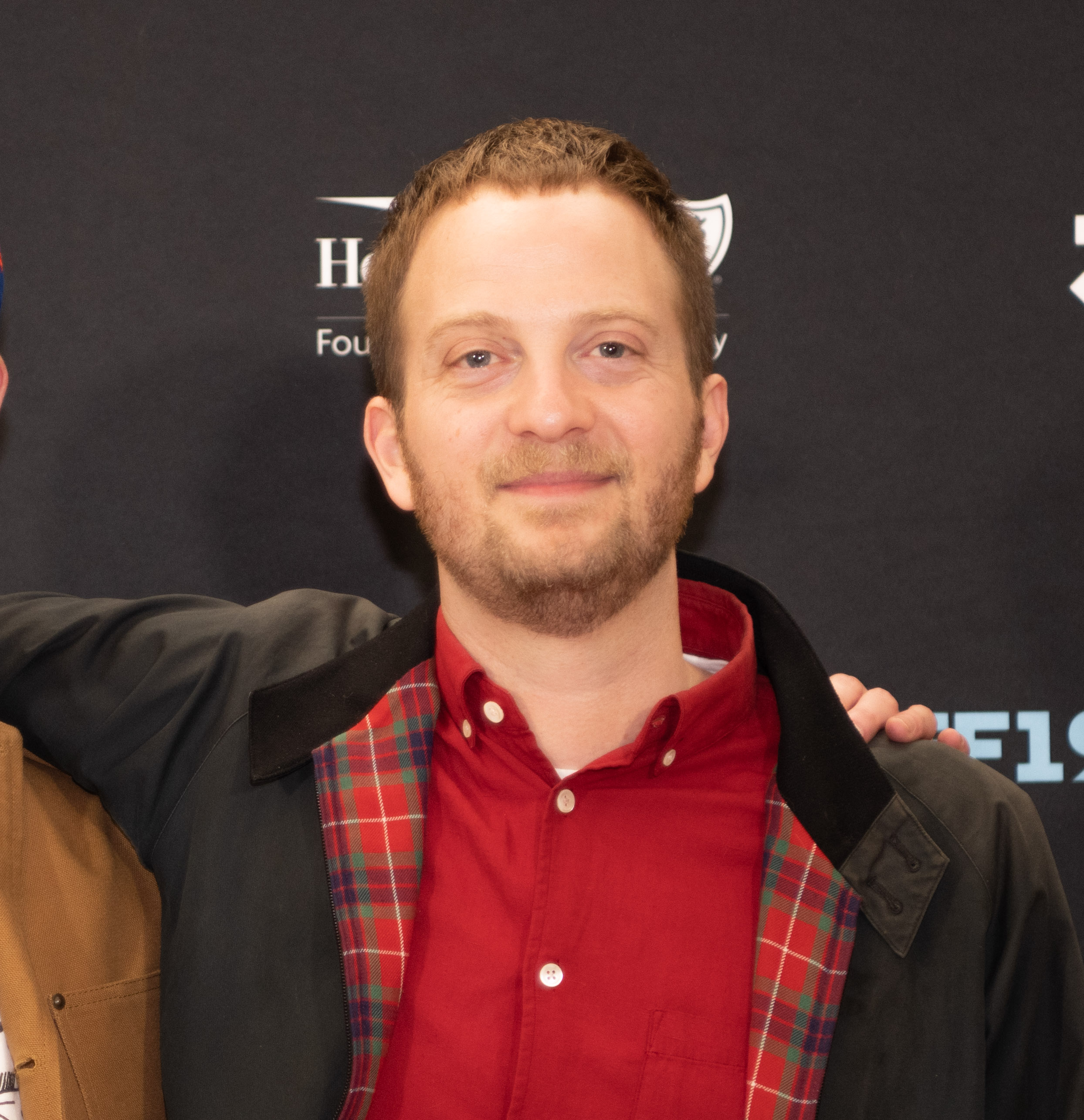
- Matt Wolf at the premiere of Recorder: The Marion Stokes Project during the Montclair Film Festival 2019
- Born: May 11, 1982 (age 44); San Jose, California, U.S.
- Occupations: Documentarian, producer, film director, artist, writer
- Years active: 2008–present

Matt Wolf (born May 11, 1982) is an Emmy Award–winning American filmmaker, documentarian, and producer. His notable films include Wild Combination: A Portrait of Arthur Russell, Teenage, Bayard & Me, Recorder: The Marion Stokes Project, Spaceship Earth, and Pee-wee as Himself. In 2010, he was awarded a Guggenheim fellowship. His films are largely documentaries about "unconventional visionaries" that are shaped by expansive archives.

== Life ==
Wolf was born in San Jose, California. As a teenager, he was involved with gay activism in the Bay Area. He was the subject of a documentary on queer youth, which he describes as a formative experience that later shaped his approach to documentary filmmaking.

When Wolf was fourteen, he watched Arthur Dong's Licensed to Kill (1997) on PBS. He came out as gay the next day.

He attended film school at New York University on a scholarship and has remained in New York City since.

== Work ==
=== Film ===
While still at NYU, Wolf worked with the video activist collective Paper Tiger Television, collaborating with queer youth and homeless queer youth on making community-based media.

His first feature documentary, Wild Combination: A Portrait of Arthur Russell, is about the avant-garde cellist and disco producer Arthur Russell. His second feature, Teenage, is about the birth of youth culture, based on a book by the British punk author Jon Savage.

In 2019, he completed his third feature film, a documentary about Marion Stokes titled Recorder: The Marion Stokes Project. That same year, Wolf co-curated the film program for the Whitney Biennial.

His two-hour documentary on Biosphere 2 titled Spaceship Earth premiered at the 2020 Sundance Film Festival and was released by Neon in May 2020.

Wolf has made a number of short films, including Bayard & Me, about the civil rights activist Bayard Rustin adopting his younger boyfriend for equal rights; I Remember, about the artist and poet Joe Brainard; It's Me, Hilary, about the Eloise illustrator Hilary Knight; and Another Hayride, about the self-help guru Louise Hay.

In November 2023, Criterion featured Wolf's full filmography on its streaming platform.

In 2025, Wolf's documentary on the life and work of Paul Reubens, titled Pee-Wee as Himself, premiered on the opening night of the Sundance Film Festival. He spent over 40 hours interviewing Reubens, and was given access to the actor's large collection of photographs and video footage. Wolf was unaware that Reubens was battling cancer throughout the production of the doc, which heavily features their contentious struggle over creative control of the project. The film includes a final message from Reubens, recorded the day before his death. The film was nominated for five Primetime Emmy Awards, and won for "Outstanding Picture Editing," "Outstanding Directing," and "Outstanding Documentary."

=== Writing ===
In 2025 it was announced that Wolf is writing a book, Trust Me, about the relationship between documentary filmmakers and their subjects for Bloomsbury. He published a first person essay in New York Magazine that same year about his contentious relationship with Paul Reubens while making Pee-wee as Himself.

While working on Recorder: The Marion Stokes Project, Wolf screened 700 hours of archival footage collected by Stokes. In 2023, he compiled a book titled Input, consisting of hundreds of stills from talk shows, local news, and commercials, with an eye for images that were "mysterious, haunting, bizarre, and beautiful to tell an abstract story about our televisual lives."

== Influences and approach ==
As a teenager, Wolf spent most of his weekends alone, watching films such as Welcome to the Dollhouse at the local independent movie theater. He discovered what's now called the "new queer cinema" at his local Blockbuster, which by chance stocked Derek Jarman and Todd Haynes films. The public library had Kenneth Anger and Maya Deren compilations. He first discovered David Wojnarowicz on the Internet, by searching for "gay art". Through David's work, Wolf first found a viable intersection between politics and art.

While at NYU, Wolf became dissatisfied with his filmmaking education, finding it too conventional and industry-oriented. He instead chose to study avant-garde cinema and video art, hoping to "internalize the conventions" within his own filmmaking. He also became involved with the art world: writing criticism for magazines, socializing mostly with visual artists, and working for a painter after graduation. In multiple interviews, Wolf credits his senior year professor Kelly Reichardt as a pivotal role model for how to be both an artist and a filmmaker. Wolf identifies as an artist.

I was never really interested in "storytelling." My approach has always been intuitive and led by emotion. I've always been interested in larger themes: cultural history, appropriation, television, queer identity, youth culture—all of these different things melded together... I'm a sensitive person, and I get very emotionally involved with my subjects. I have intense relationships with the material I'm working with, and I want to engage with it so that it becomes a part of my life experience.

== Filmography ==
=== Feature films ===
Year	Title	Director	Producer
2008	Wild Combination: A Portrait of Arthur Russell	Yes	Yes
2014	Teenage	Yes	No
2019	Recorder: The Marion Stokes Project	Yes	No
2020	Spaceship Earth	Yes	Yes
2023	The Stroll	No	Yes
2025	Pee-wee as Himself	Yes	Yes

=== Short films ===
Year	Title	Director	Producer
2012	I Remember: A Film About Joe Brainard	Yes	Yes
2015	It's Me, Hilary: The Man Who Drew Eloise	Yes	No
2016	The Face of AIDS	Yes	No
2017	The Town I Live In	Yes	No
2017	Bayard & Me	Yes	Yes
2021	Another Hayride	Yes	Yes
