= Wild Combination: A Portrait of Arthur Russell =

- Directed by: Matt Wolf
- Produced by: Philip Aarons; Shelley Fox Aarons; Kyle Garner; Ben Howe; Mark Lewin; Kyle Martin; Matt Wolf
- Cinematography: Jody Lee Lipes
- Edited by: Lance Edmands
- Release dates: February 18, 2008 (Berlinale); April 30, 2008 (United States)
- Running time: 71 minutes
- Country: United States
- Language: English

Wild Combination: A Portrait of Arthur Russell is a documentary film about musician Arthur Russell, directed by Matt Wolf. Released theatrically in 2008, the film was generally well received by critics, winning various awards at international film festivals. Its world premiere was at the Berlin International Film Festival (Panorama), and its theatrical premieres were at the IFC Center in New York and the ICA in London.

== Production ==
The title, Wild Combination, refers to one of Russell's songs by the same name.

Due to the lack of actual interview footage of Russell, the film uses artificial archival materials of an actor wearing Russell's clothes, filmed around Iowa and New York City, filmed using the outmoded VHS and Super8 formats.

== Synopsis ==
Wild Combination begins with interviews of Russell's parents discussing their youngest offspring's childhood. The film describes how Russell as a young boy is obsessed with Timothy Leary and insecure about his acne. Leaving Iowa for San Francisco in the late 1960s, he joins a Buddhist collective and befriends Allen Ginsberg. Russell moves to New York in the early 1970s, where he starts working as the musical director of the Kitchen and becomes part of the downtown scene of artists, sharing an apartment building with Allen Ginsberg and Richard Hell. Russell engages in nearly every music scene the city has to offer: disco at David Mancuso's Loft, rock at CBGB, minimal composition at the Kitchen, and Allen Ginsberg's poetry recitations. In 1978, Russell begins dating Tom Lee, whom he stays with until his AIDS-related death in 1992.

Other footage shows Russell later in life, ravaged by AIDS, but still able to play his cello and sing. Russell eventually succumbs to dementia and throat cancer. The film ends with Emily Russell, Arthur's mother, speculating that, had Arthur continued to live past 40, "He would have made it, he would have gone far".

== Reviews ==
Overall, critics enjoyed the film. The New York Times called it a "Tender, fascinating documentary that will delight the cult and instantly convert new members." Screen International said it was a "moving, celebratory documentary that will turn many viewers onto its subject's strange, compelling sounds". The Village Voice referred to it as, "resonating on an emotional level, much like Russell's most profound music does". The San Francisco Bay Guardian says the film is like "an audiovisual kiss from Russell to those who loved him, and to a greater audience who has yet to discover him". TimeOut London: "Matt Wolf's absorbing and often poignant profile of Arthur Russell is a treat for fans and neophytes alike." Artforum calls it "an intuitive, remarkably personal love letter".

On the review aggregator website Rotten Tomatoes, the film holds an approval rating of 100%, based on 6 reviews, with an average rating of 7.8/10.

== Awards ==
The film premiered at the Berlin International Film Festival. The Kitchen (where Russell was once the director) screened the film during the summer of 2008 and held a weekend devoted to Russell and his music.

The film won an award for Artistic Achievement at the Outfest festival in Los Angeles, as well as Best Documentary at the Gaze Film festival in Dublin, Ireland and Best Documentary at the In-Edit film festival in Barcelona, Spain.

== DVD release ==
The film was released by Plexifilm in 2008.

The DVD also includes rare archival footage of two full-length performances, "Soon to be Innocent Fun / Let's See" (1985) and "Calling All Kids" (1989); as well as Allen Ginsberg reading at Arthur's memorial; a 1970 recording of an audio cassette letter sent from Arthur in San Francisco to his parents; an "anti-music video" referred to as "Arthur's Sneakers"; and tribute performances of Arthur's songs by Jens Lekman, Verity Susman (of Electrelane), and Joel Gibb (of The Hidden Cameras).
