= Pee-wee as Himself =

2025 American TV documentary series

- Directed by: Matt Wolf
- Music by: Jon Brion; Michael Penn
- Country of origin: United States
- Original language: English
- No. of episodes: 2

Production
- Executive producers: Matt Wolf; Emma Tillinger Koskoff; Ronald Bronstein; Eli Bush; Benny Safdie; Josh Safdie; Paul Reubens; Candace Tomarken; Kyle Martin; Nancy Abraham; Lisa Heller; Sara Rodriguez
- Producer: Emma Tillinger Koskoff
- Cinematography: David Paul Jacobson
- Editor: Damian Rodriguez
- Running time: 100–102 minutes
- Production companies: HBO Documentary Films; Elara Pictures; First Love Films; Polari Pictures; Reubenstown

Original release
- Network: HBO
- Release: May 23, 2025

Pee-wee as Himself is a 2025 American documentary series directed and produced by Matt Wolf. It follows the life and career of actor and comedian Paul Reubens, best known for portraying the character Pee-wee Herman.

It was released on May 23, 2025, on HBO and Max.

== Premise ==
Pee-wee as Himself explores the life and career of actor Paul Reubens.

In the documentary, Reubens came out publicly as gay in interviews taped before his death in 2023. Reubens' sexuality had been discussed by certain outlets in the context of his 2002 arrest, though he had not publicly come out at that point; in the film, he notes that at various times in his life he had been in and out of the closet.

A disclaimer at the opening of both parts also reveals that Reubens had not disclosed to Wolf and those involved in the documentary that he had been battling both myelogenous leukemia and metastatic lung cancer for several years by that point, as only a few close people in Reubens' circle knew about his diagnosis. Reubens died before the production was completed and, according to Wolf, before they could film a planned final interview that would have focused fully on Reubens' arrests, particularly his 2002 arrest.

== Production ==
In March 2021, it was announced Matt Wolf would direct a documentary revolving around Paul Reubens for HBO Documentary Films, with Josh Safdie and Benny Safdie set to executive produce under their Elara Pictures banner, and Emma Tillinger Koskoff to produce. In November 2024, the project was titled Pee-wee as Himself.

Wolf spent over 40 hours interviewing Reubens, and was given access to the actor's large collection of photographs and video footage. The film includes a final message from Reubens, recorded the day before his death; he discusses his 1991 and 2002 arrests and the damage they did to his reputation, blaming homophobia for the tabloid fallout in both cases.

== Episodes ==
No.	Title	Directed by	Original release date	U.S. viewers (millions)
1	"Part One"	Matt Wolf	May 23, 2025	0.153
Reubens discusses his childhood, his beginnings in comedy, the origins of Pee-wee Herman, and the creation of Pee-wee's Big Adventure. Throughout the documentary, Reubens has some clashes with Wolf over his interview style and his inability to have creative control. Reubens also, for the first time, publicly comes out as gay, and describes his personal and professional struggles regarding his sexuality. Reubens cites his most lasting relationship during that time, with a man named Guy, as providing some of the inspiration for sone aspects of Pee-wee.
2	"Part Two"	Matt Wolf	May 23, 2025	0.133
Reubens discusses working on Pee-wee's Playhouse and the failure of Big Top Pee-wee, the latter of which has Reubens acknowledge his desire for full control likely playing a role in the film's failure. Reubens' friends and colleagues talk about his scandals and arrests and his return to playing Pee-wee. At the end, a caption reveals that after 40 hours, Reubens refused to talk about the scandals, and died before they could finally film the final interview that would have focused on that subject. However, a voicemail from Reubens recorded the day before his death is played where he does talk about the pain from the fallout.

== Release ==
It had its world premiere at the 2025 Sundance Film Festival on January 23, 2025.

== Reception ==
=== Critical reception ===
The review aggregator website Rotten Tomatoes reported a 100% approval rating based on 49 critic reviews. The website's critical consensus states, "Blessed to have the late Paul Reubens feature in candid conversation, Pee-wee as Himself is a revelatory glimpse at the complicated man behind a beloved comic creation." Metacritic, which uses a weighted average, gave a score of 82 out of 100 based on 18 critics, indicating "universal acclaim".

=== Accolades ===
Year	Award	Category	Recipient(s)	Result	Ref.
2025	Gotham TV Awards	Outstanding Original Film, Broadcast, or Streaming	Matt Wolf and Emma Tillinger Koskoff	Won	
2025	Primetime Emmy Awards	Outstanding Documentary or Nonfiction Special	Emma Tillinger Koskoff, Matt Wolf, Ronald Bronstein, Benny Safdie, Josh Safdie, Paul Reubens, and Candace Tomarken	Won	
2025	Primetime Emmy Awards	Outstanding Directing for a Documentary/Nonfiction Program	Matt Wolf	Won	
2025	Primetime Emmy Awards	Outstanding Picture Editing for a Nonfiction Program	Damian Rodriguez	Won	
2025	Primetime Emmy Awards	Outstanding Sound Editing for a Nonfiction or Reality Program	Daniel Timmons, Ian Cymore, Ryan Billia, Jeremy S. Bloom, Kelly Rodriguez, Eric Caudieux, and Jonathan Zalben	Nominated	
2025	Primetime Emmy Awards	Outstanding Sound Mixing for a Nonfiction Program	Johnny Mathie	Nominated	
2025	TCA Awards	Outstanding Achievement in News and Information	Pee-wee as Himself	Won	
2026	Film Independent Spirit Awards	Best New Non-Scripted or Documentary Series	Matt Wolf, Emma Tillinger Koskoff, Ronald Bronstein, Eli Bush, Benny Safdie, Josh Safdie, Paul Reubens (posthumous), Candace Tomarken, Kyle Martin, Nancy Abraham, Lisa Heller, and Sara Rodriguez (executive producers)	Won	
2026	GLAAD Media Awards	Outstanding Documentary	Pee-wee as Himself	Nominated	
