= Teenage (2013 American film) =

- Film poster
- Directed by: Matt Wolf
- Screenplay by: Matt Wolf; Jon Savage
- Based on: Teenage: The Creation of Youth Culture by Jon Savage
- Produced by: Kyle Martin; Ben Howe
- Cinematography: Nick Bentgen
- Edited by: Joe Beshenkovsky
- Music by: Bradford Cox
- Production company: Cinereach
- Distributed by: Oscilloscope Laboratories
- Release dates: April 20, 2013 (Tribeca Film Festival); March 14, 2014 (United States)
- Running time: 77 minutes
- Country: United States
- Language: English

Teenage is a 2013 documentary film directed by Matt Wolf and based on Jon Savage's book Teenage: The Creation of Youth Culture. In the documentary, Wolf attempts to bring to life the "prehistory" of youth culture which preceded and evolved into the concept of teenage culture in the 1950s and beyond. The film had its world premiere at the Tribeca Film Festival on April 20, 2013. and was released in a limited release and through video on demand on March 14, 2014, by Oscilloscope Laboratories.

== Plot ==
The film documents the evolution of youth culture from the early twentieth century starting in 1904 until the end of WWII in 1945 when the concept of the "teenager" was developed. Youth culture and movements through four decades of evolution are examined as they emerged primarily in European countries. By the end of World War II, the new teenage demographic was recognised in 1945 with the publication by The New York Times of the "Teen Age Bill of Rights" by Elliot E. Cohen, which, among other things, asserted the youths' right to determine their future and control their lives.

== Background ==
The film documents the history of German youth movements like the Wandervogel, the Hitler Youth, and the Swing Kids of Hamburg. It also examines the role young people played in the resistance against the Nazis, showcasing Sophie Scholl and her organisation White Rose, an anti-Nazi resistance group. As part of its retrospective into the early UK youth culture, the film looks into the lives of Brenda Dean Paul and the bright young things. American youth movements such as the flappers, victory girls and Boy Scouts are also included in the film.

== Cast ==
- Jena Malone as American Girl (voice)
- Ben Whishaw as British Boy (voice)
- Jessie Usher as American Boy (voice)
- Julia Hummer as German Girl (voice)
- Ben Rosenfield as Tommie Scheel
- Oliver John-Rodgers as Tommie's best friend
- Alden Ehrenreich as 1940s Teenager
- Leah Hennessey as Brenda Dean Paul
- Don Anstock as Bright Young Thing
- Malik Peters as Warren Wall

== Technique ==
In the making of his film, Matt Wolf used those parts from Savage's book that were also found in archival footage of the era so that they could be shown in their original form on the screen. The main thesis of Wolf, as it unfolds through the documentary narrative, is that the teenagers gradually became a distinct demographic due to social changes such as their entrance in the labour force and conscription. Wolf's documentary does not follow a linear historical account of the events but develops its story by meandering through the musings and thoughts of past youth which are voiced by the actors.

For narration, the film uses first-person accounts derived from personal diaries, films, and biographies of the people depicted in the documentary. In the case of Brend Dean Paul, Wolf uses her autobiography, published in 1935, to narrate her segment in the film. In a similar vein, the Hamburg Swing Kids are shown in the documentary through their self-made movies.

There is no single narrator for the film. Instead four actors use their voices to portray different people. Jena Malone voices an American girl, Ben Whishaw narrates the British segment, Jessie Usher voices the African-American youth and Julia Hummer narrates the life of a German girl in Nazi Germany, based on Melita Maschmann's diary “Account Rendered”.

According to The Guardian the blending of faux Super 8 film footage with the actual archive footage is successful but since it is not flagged as such, it raises questions regarding the authenticity and "good faith" of what is being presented.

== Interviews ==
Wolf has described his film as a "living collage". In an interview with the Tribeca Film Festival, Wolf was asked why he highlighted the personalities of Bright young things member Brenda Dean Paul, Hitler Youth Melita Maschmann, Swing Kid Tommy Scheel, and Boy Scout Warren Hall in his documentary. He replied that he considers Brenda Dean Paul as a "proto-Lindsay Lohan". He also said that he considers Melita Maschmann, a Hitler Youth leader, as a "very extreme character" who rebelled against her parents by joining Hitler's Youth. Wolf continued that he considers Nazi-era youth Tommy Scheel, who smuggled swing records and British fashion as a form of rebellion against the Nazis, as the "hippest of them all" and "almost like a proto-punk".

In the same interview, Wolf also said that he was "intrigued" by Warren Hall because he was an ordinary kid, unlike the other characters who were larger than life. According to Wolf, Warren, as a boy scout, just wanted to "fit in", but was "hampered" by the racism of his era and expressed his "anger and frustration" against the discrimination he experienced.

In the Tribeca interview when asked if he thinks that women are "catalysts [for change]", given his extended coverage of their viewpoint in his documentary, Wolf replied positively explaining that young women faced oppression not only because of their youth but also because of their gender, "fac[ing] both misogyny and ageism".

In another interview with the New York Times Style Magazine, when asked what the youth movements such as the Boy Scouts the Wandervogel, the Jitterbugs etc. had in common, Wolf replied: "Rebellion", which, although expressed in different ways and contexts, "it all contained a kernel of desire to break away from their parents’ generation’s values and beliefs".

== Reception ==
The Washington Post review remarks that "[i]t’s hard to believe that not so long ago, the word teenager did not exist." and calls Wolf's documentary techniques a "refreshingly impressionistic approach to the documentary form" which "result is an oral history that moves, a series of personal recollections about the key moments in the ascendance of youth culture that unfolds like a teenage dream." The Washington Post criticises the lack of depth of coverage of the events depicted in the documentary and comments that the audience may have to use Google Search or go to Wikipedia to find out about the background details and history of the events. The reviewer ends the critique by commenting that the pictures of teens of years past have the same expressions as those of modern youth, which reflect similar beliefs.

The Guardian remarks that in the documentary, Wolf "concentrates on the strange, bubbling energy and intensity", although he could have also presented the more sad or mundane aspects of teenage life. The Guardian also remarks that "[t]he history of teenagerdom feels like the history of a revolutionary artistic movement, like surrealism or situationism, full of wild clothes, new music, provocation and excitement."

The Hollywood Reporter remarks that Wolf, in his attempt to make the documentary more attractive to the audience, did not rely on period music to provide the musical background of his documentary but gave Bradford Cox the task of composing the soundtrack for the film, concluding that "[t]he result is a subjective history that conjures up restlessness and rebellion as young people tell their own histories."

The Globe and Mail describes the film as "[a] scrapbook of fascinating archival footage, newspaper clippings and quotes from teenage diaries, the film traces the preludes of this “second stage” of life between child and adulthood."

== Release ==
The film had its world premiere at the Tribeca Film Festival on April 20, 2013. in August 2013, Oscilloscope Laboratories had acquired distribution rights to the film. It went onto screen at the London Film Festival on October 10, 2013. The film was released on March 14, 2014, in a limited release and through video on demand.
