= Input (talk show) =

Input is a Sunday morning public access talk show co-produced by Marion Stokes and her husband John that aired locally in Philadelphia from 1967 to 1971.

== Summary ==
Its focus was mainly on social justice topics ranging from religion to violence.
