= Paul Reubens =

American actor and comedian (1952–2023)

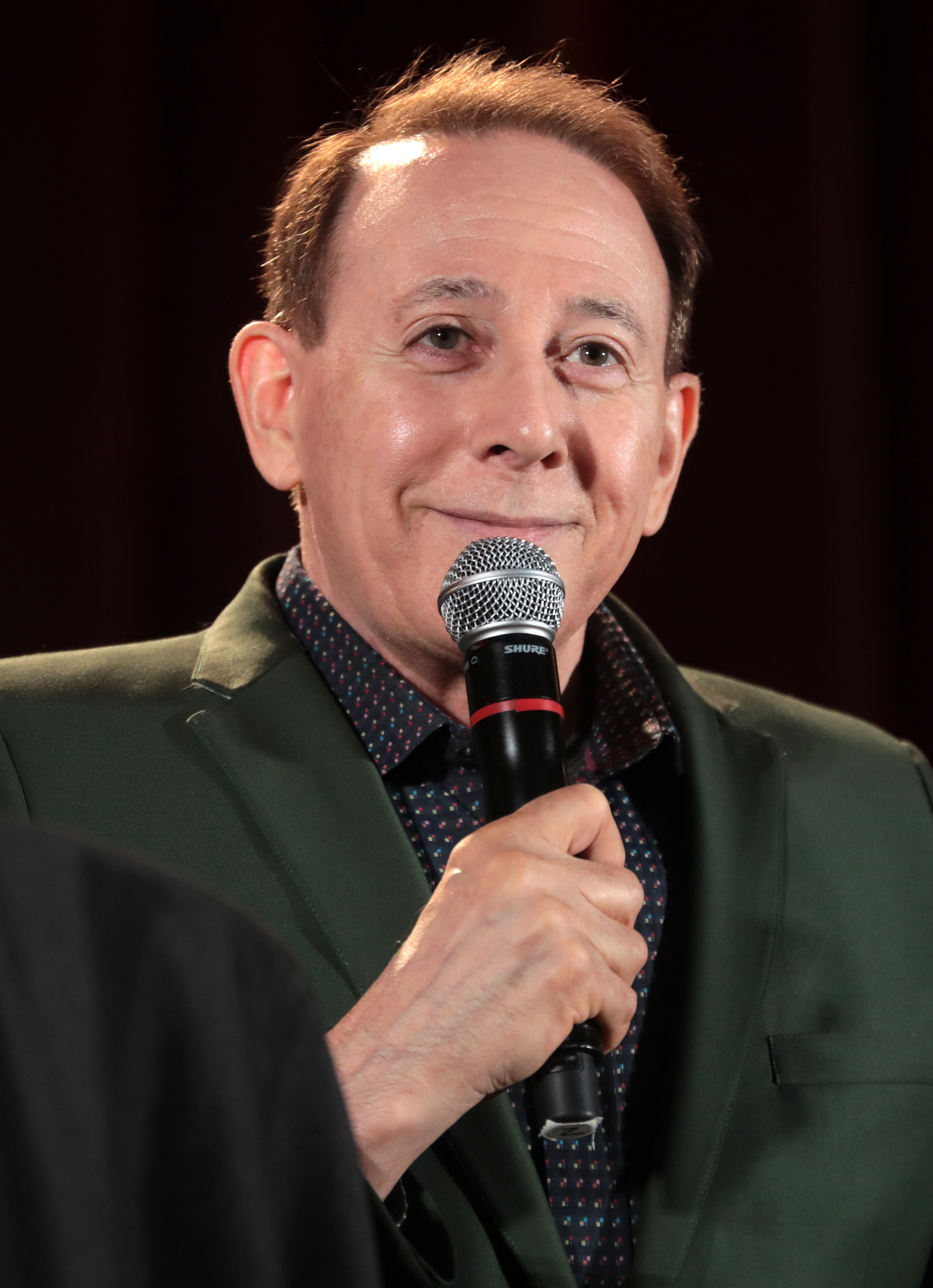
- Reubens in 2019
- Born: Paul Rubenfeld; August 27, 1952; Peekskill, New York, U.S.
- Died: July 30, 2023 (aged 70); Los Angeles, California, U.S.
- Resting place: Hollywood Forever Cemetery
- Education: California Institute of the Arts (BFA)
- Occupations: Actor; comedian; writer; producer
- Years active: 1977–2023
- Father: Milton Rubenfeld
- Relatives: Abby Rubenfeld (sister)
- Website: peewee.com

Paul Reubens (/ˈruːbənz/; né Rubenfeld; August 27, 1952 – July 30, 2023) was an American actor and comedian, widely known for creating and portraying the character Pee-wee Herman.

Born in Peekskill, New York and raised in both Oneonta, New York and Sarasota, Florida, Reubens joined the Los Angeles-based troupe the Groundlings in the 1970s and started his career as an improvisational comedian and stage actor. Reubens developed his Pee-wee character at the Groundlings. After a failed audition for Saturday Night Live (Reubens was one of twenty-two finalists to be chosen as a regular on the show and thought his career was over when Gilbert Gottfried was chosen over him), Reubens debuted a stage show starring Pee-wee, The Pee-wee Herman Show, in 1981. Pee-wee quickly became a cult figure and, for the next decade, Reubens completely committed to his character, conducting all public appearances and interviews as Pee-wee. He produced and wrote a feature film, Pee-wee's Big Adventure (1985), directed by Tim Burton, which was a financial and critical success. Its sequel, Big Top Pee-wee (1988), was less successful. Between 1986 and 1990, Reubens starred as Pee-wee in the CBS Saturday-morning children's program Pee-wee's Playhouse.

Reubens was arrested for indecent exposure in an adult theater in Sarasota in 1991. The arrest garnered major national media attention, and though he received support from some colleagues in the entertainment industry, it significantly harmed Reubens's career. Reubens maintained a low profile through much of the 1990s as a result, before returning to appearing in big-budget projects including Mystery Men (1999) and Blow (2001). He subsequently began giving interviews as himself rather than as Pee-wee. Reubens was later investigated and charged with child pornography offenses in 2002, which he strongly denied. He later pleaded guilty to a misdemeanor obscenity charge as part of a plea deal.

Reubens acted in numerous television shows such as Murphy Brown, 30 Rock, Portlandia, and The Blacklist. He revived the Pee-wee character in the 2010s, performing on stage in The Pee-wee Herman Show, which ran in Los Angeles and on Broadway, and writing and co-starring in the Netflix original film Pee-wee's Big Holiday (2016).

Reubens's Pee-wee character maintained an enduring popularity with both children and adults. Playhouse garnered 15 Emmy Awards during its initial run, and was aired again on late-night television in the 2000s, during which TV Guide dubbed it among the top ten cult classic television programs. Reubens died in July 2023 from cancer.

== Early life and education ==
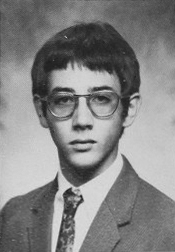
Reubens as a high school senior, 1970

Reubens was born Paul Rubenfeld in Peekskill, New York, on August 27, 1952, and grew up in a Jewish family, where his parents, Judy (née Rosen, 1928–2019) and Milton Rubenfeld (1919–2004), owned a lamp store. His mother was a teacher. His father was an automobile salesperson who had flown for Britain's Royal Air Force and for the U.S. Army Air Forces in World War II, and later became one of the founding pilots of the Israeli Air Force during the 1948 Arab–Israeli War. An Orthodox Jew, he was one of five Jewish pilots to fly against Arab forces in smuggled fighter planes.

Reubens had two younger siblings: Luke (born 1958), a dog trainer, and Abby (born 1953), an attorney and a board member of the American Civil Liberties Union of Tennessee.

Reubens spent his early childhood in Oneonta, New York before moving with his parents to Sarasota, Florida at the age of nine. As a child, he frequented the Ringling Bros. and Barnum & Bailey Circus, whose winter headquarters were in Sarasota. The circus atmosphere sparked Reubens's interest in entertainment and influenced his later work. He also loved to watch reruns of I Love Lucy, which made him want to make people laugh. At age five, Reubens asked his father to build him a stage where he and his siblings would act out plays.

Reubens attended Sarasota High School, where he was named president of the National Thespian Society. He was accepted into Northwestern University's summer program for gifted high-school students, joined the local Asolo Theater, Players of Sarasota Theater, and appeared in several plays.

After high school graduation, he attended Plymouth State University for one semester. He then attended Boston University. When he began auditioning for acting schools, he was turned down by the Juilliard School and Carnegie Mellon University.

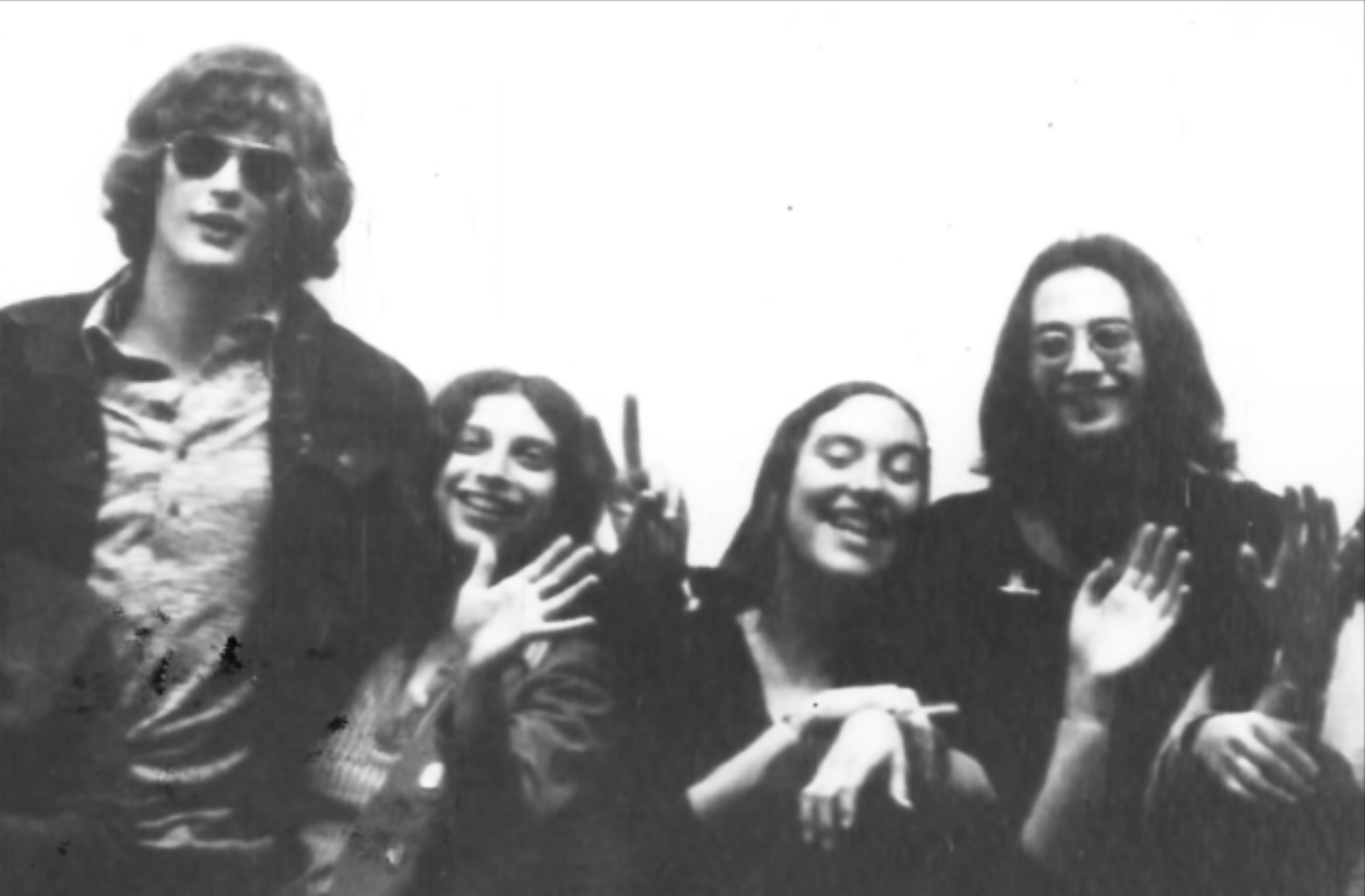
Photograph of (left to right) David Hasselhoff, Cassandra Peterson, Katey Sagal and Paul Reubens at CalArts in the early 1970s

Reubens was accepted at the California Institute of the Arts, where he graduated with a BFA in Theatre in 1973. As a student, Reubens was described by The New Yorker as "the wildest of a wild bunch". He acted in a student film in Cher-inspired mermaid drag and kissed all of his classmates at a Valentine's Day kissing booth. Some of his CalArts classmates included Katey Sagal, Michael Richards and David Hasselhoff, who was his roommate for a time. Sagal described Reubens as her "fantastically colorful best buddy" down the hall from her in the dorm, who would listen to her play music on the piano. She recalled that Reubens's dorm room was like a real-life Pee-wee's Playhouse. "He was the only one with a decorated dorm room, everyone else had posters with Scotch tape, and you'd go to his room and it was a party."

== Career ==
After graduating, his early jobs in California included working in restaurant kitchens and as a Fuller Brush salesman.

=== 1977–1979: Comedy beginnings ===
In the 1970s, Reubens began performing at local comedy clubs. Starting in 1977, he made 14 guest appearances on The Gong Show, four of which involved a boy–girl act he had developed with Charlotte McGinnis entitled The Hilarious Betty and Eddie. During his stint on The Gong Show, Reubens introduced a Native American lounge-singer character named Jay Longtoe, decked out in sequined loincloth and feathered headdress. "This doesn't say much for the audience," Reubens explains in the documentary Pee-wee as Himself. "But the audience ate it up and went crazy. So I was like, Hey, I'm getting laughs...I had no clue it was like a billion percent—not even borderline racist—I mean, it was full-on racist. Until Pee-wee Herman came along, I thought that was my ticket. I thought I would be propelled to stardom as a Native American lounge singer. Thank God that wasn't the case."

He soon joined the Los Angeles–based improvisational comedy team the Groundlings. He remained a troupe member for six years, working with Bob McClurg, Edie McClurg, John Paragon, Susan Barnes, and Phil Hartman. Hartman and Reubens became friends, and they often wrote and worked together on material. In 1980, Reubens had a small part as a waiter in The Blues Brothers.

The character of "Pee-wee Herman" originated during a 1978 improvisation exercise with the Groundlings, where Reubens came up with the idea of a man who wanted to be a comic but was so inept at telling jokes that it was obvious to the audience that he would never make it. Fellow Groundling Phil Hartman afterwards helped Reubens develop the character while another Groundling, John Paragon, helped write the show. Despite being compared to other famous characters, such as Hergé's Tintin and Collodi's Pinocchio, Reubens said that there was no specific source for "Pee-wee" other than a collection of ideas. Pee-wee's voice originated in 1970 when Reubens appeared in a production of Life with Father, where he was cast as one of the most obnoxious characters in the play. For this role, Reubens adopted a cartoon-like way of speaking, which became Pee-wee's voice.

Pee-wee's first name came from a one-inch Pee Wee brand harmonica Reubens had as a child, and the surname Herman was the last name of an energetic boy Reubens knew from his youth. The original small, gray suit Pee-wee wore had been handmade for Groundlings Director and Founder Gary Austin, who passed it on to Reubens. The origin of the red tie is less clear, as Reubens claimed that "someone" handed him the "little kid bow tie" before a performance.

=== 1981–1984: The Pee-wee Herman Show ===
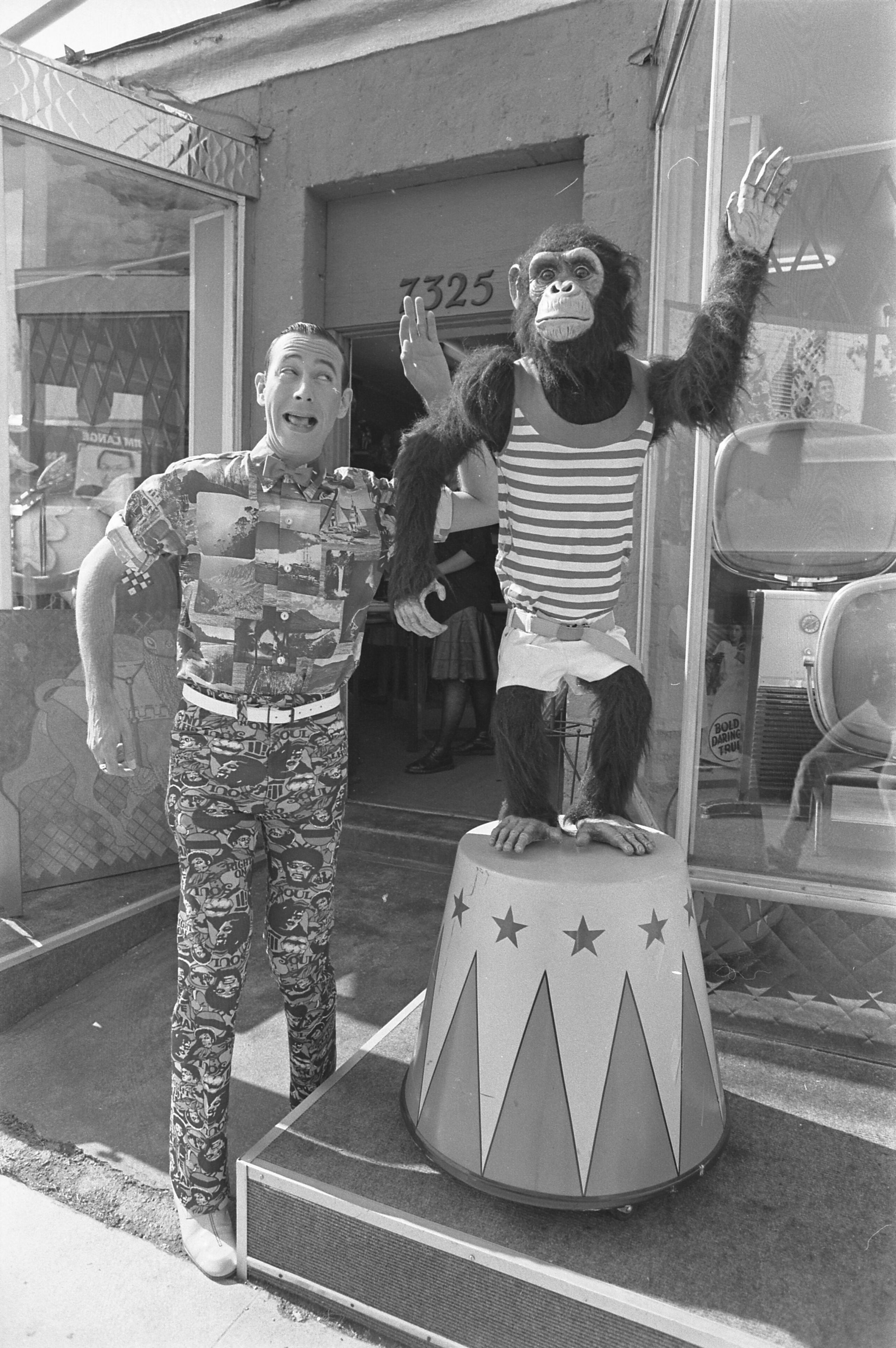
Reubens exploring Melrose Avenue in Los Angeles (1984)

Reubens auditioned for the Saturday Night Live 1980–1981 season on the same day as comedian Gilbert Gottfried. Reubens told Entertainment Weekly hiring both was not an option because they were "the same type of performer", and he knew immediately Gottfried would get the job. He also told the San Francisco Chronicle he believed that "the fix was in" because Gottfried was friends with one of the producers. Reubens was so angry and bitter that he decided he would borrow money and start his own show in Los Angeles using the character he had been developing during the previous few years, "Pee-wee Herman".

With the help of other Groundlings like John Paragon, Phil Hartman, and Lynne Marie Stewart, Pee-wee acquired a small group of followers, and Reubens took his show to the Roxy Theatre where The Pee-wee Herman Show ran for five sellout months. He performed midnight shows for adults and weekly matinees for children, later entering the mainstream when HBO aired The Pee-wee Herman Show in 1981 as part of their series On Location. Reubens also appeared as Pee-wee in the 1980 film Cheech & Chong's Next Movie. He again appeared in 1981's Cheech & Chong's Nice Dreams; the end credits of the film billed him as "Hamburger Dude". Reubens's act had mainly positive reactions and quickly acquired a group of fans, despite being described as "bizarre", and Reubens being described as "the weirdest comedian around". Pee-wee was both "corny" and "hip", "retrograde" and "avant-garde".

When Pee-wee's fame started growing, Reubens started to move away from the spotlight, keeping his name under wraps and making all his public appearance and interviews in character while billing Pee-wee as playing himself; Reubens was trying to "get the public to think that that was a real person". Later on he would even prefer his parents be known only as Honey Herman and Herman Herman. In the early and mid-1980s, Reubens made several guest appearances on Late Night with David Letterman as Pee-wee Herman which gave Pee-wee an even bigger following. During the mid-1980s, Reubens traveled the United States with a whole new The Pee-wee Herman Show, playing at the Guthrie Theater in Minneapolis, Caroline's in New York City and, in 1984, in front of a full Carnegie Hall.

=== 1985: Pee-wee's Big Adventure ===
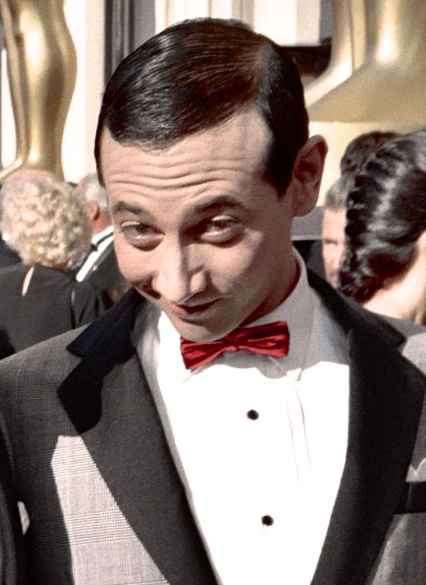
Reubens as Pee-wee Herman at the 1988 Academy Awards

The success of The Pee-wee Herman Show prompted Warner Bros. to hire Reubens to write a script for a full-length Pee-wee Herman film. Reubens's original idea was to do a remake of Pollyanna, which Reubens claimed was his favorite film. Halfway through writing the script, Reubens noticed everyone at Warner Bros. had a bike with them, which inspired Reubens to start on a new script with Phil Hartman. The studio had approved a director for the film but it was a choice that neither the producers (William E. McEuen and Richard Gilbert Abramson) or Reubens felt was appropriate for the project. Taking inspiration from Sylvester Stallone, who refused to cede creative control to studios, Reubens turned down Warner Bros.'s choice for the director, and the studio then told him to find someone "approvable, available, and affordable" within a week.

Reubens had heard about Tim Burton at a party the same night that he had gotten permission from the studio to get an extension on his director search. "I screened 'Frankenweenie and I spoke to Shelley Duvall, who was a friend of mine who was in (the film)," Reubens explained. "I knew Tim was the director about 15 seconds into Frankenweenie, like the second or third shot of it. I was looking at the wallpaper in this bedroom and the lighting and just going, 'This is the guy who has style and understands art direction.' Those were two really important things for me and my baby, I guess, and you know it just happened to luckily all work out." The film tells the story of Pee-wee Herman embarking on nationwide adventure in search of his stolen bicycle. The film went on to gross $40,940,662 domestically, recouping almost six times its $7 million budget. At the time of release in 1985, the film received mixed reviews, but Pee-wee's Big Adventure developed into a cult film.

=== 1986–1991: Pee-wee's Playhouse ===
After seeing the success of Pee-wee's Big Adventure, the CBS network approached Reubens with an ill-received cartoon series proposal. In 1986, CBS agreed to sign Reubens to act, produce, and direct his live-action children's program, Pee-wee's Playhouse, with a budget of $325,000 per episode, the same price as a prime-time sitcom, and no creative interference from CBS; although CBS did request a few minor changes throughout the years. After casting actors like Laurence Fishburne and S. Epatha Merkerson, production began in New York City. The opening credits of the show were sung by Cyndi Lauper (under the pseudonym Ellen Shaw). Playhouse was designed as an educational yet entertaining and artistic show for children and, despite being greatly influenced by 1950s shows Reubens watched as a child like The Rocky and Bullwinkle Show, The Mickey Mouse Club, Captain Kangaroo, and Howdy Doody, it quickly acquired a dual audience of children and adults. Reubens, always trying to make Pee-wee a positive role model, created a consciously moral show, one that would teach children the Golden Rule. Reubens believed that children liked Playhouse because it was fast-paced, colorful and "never talked down to them"; while parents liked Playhouse because it reminded them of the past.

In 1986, Reubens (billed as Paul Mall) was the voice of the ship's computer in Flight of the Navigator. In 1987, Reubens provided the voice for the pilot droid RX-24 a.k.a. Captain "Rex" in Star Tours, a Star Wars-themed motion simulator attraction at Disneyland and Disney-MGM Studios at Walt Disney World, and Disneyland Paris. He also reprised the role of Pee-wee Herman in cameo appearances in the film Back to the Beach and TV show Sesame Street, the latter of which made a cameo in Playhouse.

Right after the success of Pee-wee's Big Adventure, Reubens began working with Paramount Pictures on a sequel entitled Big Top Pee-wee. Reubens and George McGrath's script was directed by Grease director Randal Kleiser. The film was not as successful as its predecessor, receiving mild reviews and doing just over one third as well in the box office, earning only $15 million.

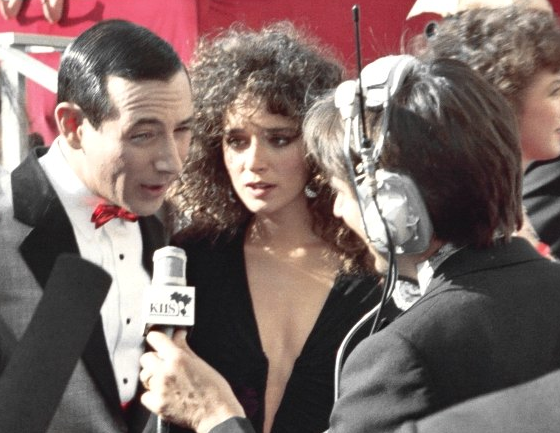
Reubens giving an interview in character with Valeria Golino at the 1988 Academy Awards

Pee-wee's Playhouse aired from September 13, 1986, until November 10, 1990. Reubens had originally agreed to do two more seasons after the third, and when CBS asked Reubens about the possibility of a sixth season he declined, wanting to take a sabbatical. Reubens had been suffering from burnout from playing Pee-wee full-time and had been warning that Pee-wee was temporary and that he had other ideas he would like to work on. The parties agreed to end the show after five seasons, which included 45 episodes and a Christmas Special. Playhouse garnered 22 Emmy Awards.

=== 1992–2002: Public retreat and comeback ===
After his 1991 arrest (see below), Reubens kept a low profile, dedicating himself to writing and collecting a variety of things, "everything from fake food, to lamps", although he did do some dubbing and took small parts in films such as 1992's Buffy the Vampire Slayer and Tim Burton's Batman Returns (Reubens portrayed the Penguin's father) and 1996's Matilda and Dunston Checks In. In 1993, he voiced the character Lock in another one of Burton's productions, The Nightmare Before Christmas. Pee-wee's Playhouse had already ended by the time Reubens was arrested. He cited an overworked crew and a decline in the show's quality in his decision against making a sixth season. The show's popularity and quantity of episodes had allowed for rerun broadcasts, but CBS canceled the reruns on July 29, 1991.

During the mid-1990s, Reubens played a recurring role on the TV series Murphy Brown. The role earned him positive reviews and his only non-Pee-wee Emmy nomination, for Outstanding Guest Actor in a Comedy Series. He appeared six times on the show between 1995 and 1997. Afterward, Reubens began working on an NBC pilot entitled Meet the Muckles, a show that would be based on You Can't Take It with You. The project got stuck in development hell and was later dropped when Reubens's ideas grew too elaborate and expensive, although Philip Rosenthal blamed NBC's negative response on Reubens being on a "blacklist".

By 1999, Reubens had given several interviews as himself and made public appearances while promoting the film Mystery Men, the first being on The Tonight Show with Jay Leno that year. He also starred in Dwight Yoakam's Western South of Heaven, West of Hell, portraying a rapist and killer. In 2001, Reubens had his first extended television role since Playhouse, as the host of the short-lived ABC game show You Don't Know Jack, based on the video game series of the same name. It was cancelled after six episodes due to low ratings.

Reubens played a flamboyant hairdresser turned drug dealer in Ted Demme's 2001 drama Blow, which starred Penélope Cruz and Johnny Depp. His performance was praised and he began receiving scripts for potential film projects.

=== 2004–2008: Cameos and guest appearances ===
Reubens made cameos and guest appearances in numerous projects. He played Rick of the citizen's patrol on the popular Comedy Central series Reno 911!, which gained him a small role in the 2007 film Reno 911!: Miami. In 2006, he appeared in the second music video of the Raconteurs' song "Steady, As She Goes". The video has the band engaging in a comical soapbox car race, with Reubens playing the bad guy who sabotages the race.

In 2007, Reubens attended his own tribute at the SF Sketchfest, where he talked about his career with Ben Fong-Torres. He also signed with NBC to make a pilot on a show called Area 57, a sitcom about a passive-aggressive alien, but it was not picked up for the 2007–2008 season. Reubens did, however, appear on the hit NBC series 30 Rock as an inbred Austrian prince, a character Tina Fey created for him. He also made three guest appearances on FX's series Dirt playing a washed-up, alcoholic reporter named Chuck Lafoon. This time he was recommended for the role by Dirt star and close friend Courteney Cox. Cox's husband, David Arquette, then cast Reubens for his directorial debut, the 2007 film The Tripper.

In June 2007, Reubens appeared as Pee-wee Herman at the Spike TV's Guys Choice Awards for the first time since 1992.

Reubens also had small parts dubbing or making cameos in a series of Cartoon Network projects such as the 2006 television film Re-Animated, the animated cartoon series Chowder, Tom Goes to the Mayor, and Tim and Eric Awesome Show, Great Job!.

In 2008, Reubens was slated to appear as homeopathic antidepressant salesman Alfredo Aldarisio in the third episode of Pushing Daisies, but the role was recast with Raúl Esparza. Reubens instead appeared in the role of Oscar Vibenius in the series' 7th and 9th episodes.

Also, during 2008, Reubens did a PSA for Unscrew America, a website that aims to get people to change regular light bulbs for more energy-efficient ones in the form of CFLs and LED. He also appeared in Todd Solondz's Life During Wartime.

From 2009 to 2011, Reubens voiced Bat-Mite in Batman: The Brave and the Bold.

=== 2009–2023: Revival and later work ===
In January 2009, Reubens hinted that negotiations were under way for his stage show to come back, and in August the return of The Pee-wee Herman Show was announced. Reubens said he felt Pee-wee calling, "I just got up one day and felt like I'm gonna come back, that was it." The show is also a way to "introduce Pee-wee to the new generation that didn't know about it", preparing the way for Reubens's main project, the Playhouse film. Before this comeback, Reubens's present age and shape had been pointed out as a possible issue, since Pee-wee's slim figure and clean skin have been one of his trademarks. But after appearing for the first time since 1992 as Pee-wee at Spike TV's 2007 Guys Choice Awards, Reubens had remained optimistic and had jokingly said he's no longer nervous about being young Pee-wee again thanks to digital retouching.

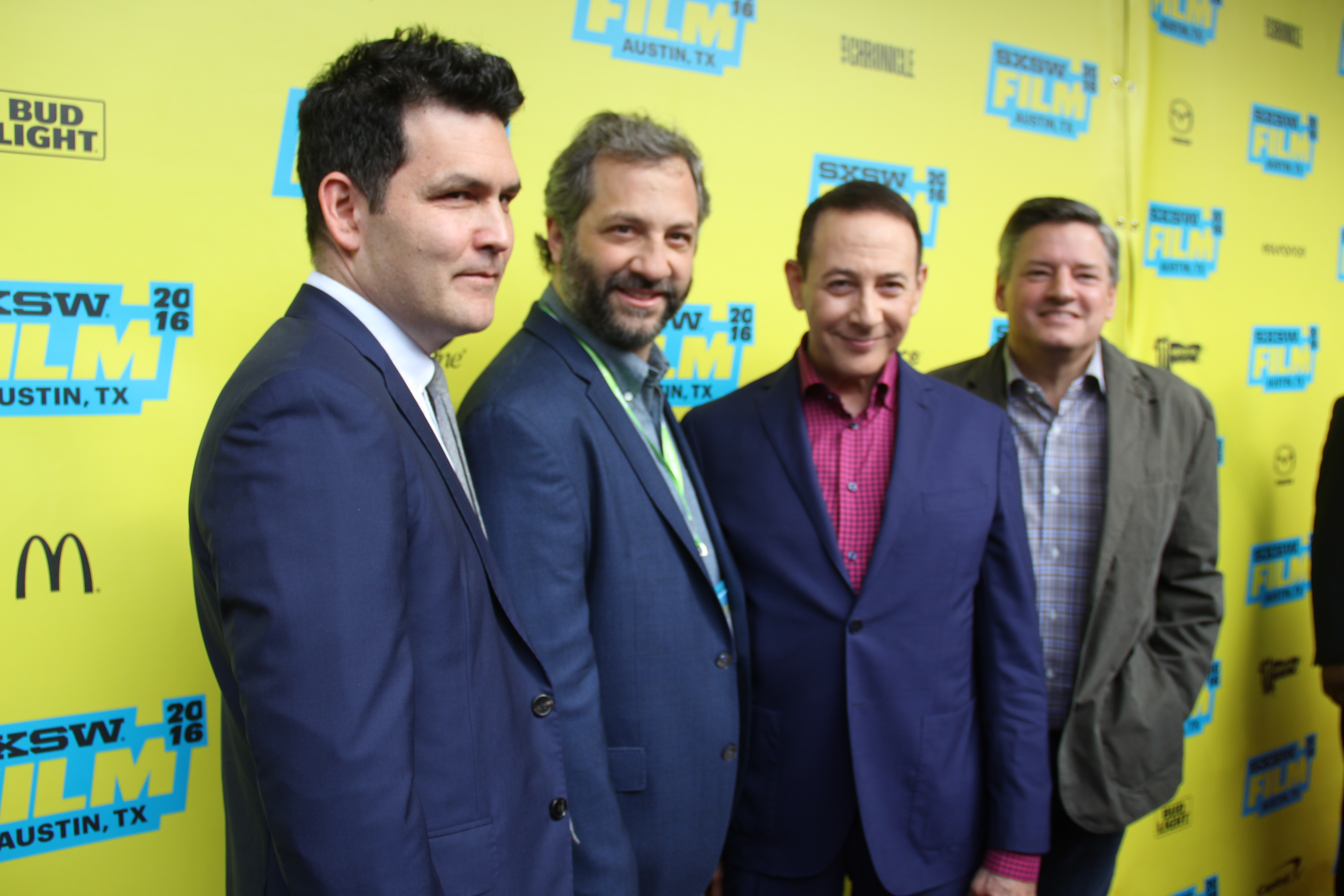
John Lee, Judd Apatow, Reubens and Ted Sarandos at the premiere of Pee-wee's Big Holiday in 2016

The show was originally scheduled to begin November 8 and continue until the 29th at the Music Box Theatre in Hollywood. Due to high demand, the show moved to Club Nokia at LA Live and was scheduled to run between January 12 and February 7, 2010. To promote the show, Reubens once again gave interviews in character, appearing as a guest on The Jay Leno Show, The Tonight Show with Conan O'Brien (as well as O'Brien's subsequent Legally Prohibited Tour), and Jimmy Kimmel Live!, among others. A Twitter account, a Facebook account, and a new website were made for Pee-wee after the show changed venues.

On November 11, 2010, the show relocated to New York City for a limited run at the Stephen Sondheim Theatre, selling over $3 million in advance tickets. An extra performance was taped for the HBO network on January 6, 2011, and debuted March 19.

From 2012 to 2013, Reubens contributed his voice talents to the animated series Tron: Uprising as Pavel. In 2014, Reubens appeared in TV on the Radio's music video for "Happy Idiot".

In February 2015, Netflix acquired the rights to produce a new Pee-wee film entitled Pee-wee's Big Holiday with Reubens and Judd Apatow producing the film, John Lee directing, and Reubens and Paul Rust writing the screenplay. The film released on March 18, 2016, on Netflix to positive reception.

Reubens went on to reprise his role as pilot droid Rex in Star Wars: Galaxy's Edge, a Star Wars-themed land that opened at Disneyland and Disney's Hollywood Studios at Walt Disney World in 2019. Reubens previously portrayed the character in the original Star Tours attraction in 1987 and Star Wars Rebels in 2014. In Galaxy's Edge, the former Star Tours pilot droid RX-24 – "Rex" – has been reprogrammed into DJ R-3X, the house DJ of a bar and restaurant called Oga's Cantina.

Reubens also voiced Ivor in Minecraft: Story Mode, which he claimed to be among his favorite voice acting roles.

== Undeveloped scripts ==
When Reubens started giving interviews again after his 2002 arrest, he talked about the two scripts he had written for future Pee-wee Herman films.

Reubens once called his first script The Pee-wee Herman Story, describing it as a black comedy. He also referred to the script as "dark Pee-wee" or "adult Pee-wee", with the plot involving Pee-wee becoming famous as a singer after making a hit single and moving to Hollywood, where "he does everything wrong and becomes a big jerk". Reubens further explained the film has many "Valley of the Dolls moments". Reubens thought this script would be the first one to start production, but in 2006 Reubens announced he was to start filming his second script in 2007.

The second film, a family-friendly adventure, is called Pee-wee's Playhouse: The Movie by Reubens, and follows Pee-wee and his Playhouse friends on a road-trip adventure, meaning that they would leave the house for the first time and go out into "Puppetland". All of the original characters of the show, live-action and puppets are included in Reubens's script. The story happens in a fantasy land that would be reminiscent of H.R. Pufnstuf and The Wonderful Wizard of Oz. In January 2009, Reubens told Gary Panter that the rejected first script of Pee-wee's Big Adventure (which they co-wrote) could have a film deal very soon and that it would be "90 minutes of incredible beauty". In December 2009, while in character, Reubens said this film is "already done, the script is already fully written; It's ready to shoot." Most of the film will take place in Puppetland and claymation might be used.

Although he did not reveal much about the scripts, he said that one of the two films opens in prison. He also said that using CGI for "updating" the puppets' looks could be an option, but it all depended on the budget the films would have. Reubens once mentioned the possibility of doing one of the two as an animated film along the lines of The Polar Express (2004), which uses performance capture technology, incorporating the movements of live actors into animated characters.

Reubens approached Pee-wee's Big Adventure director Tim Burton with one of the scripts and talked to Johnny Depp about the possibility of having him portray Pee-wee, but Burton was too busy, and Depp said he would have to think about it.

In January 2010, Reubens reprised his role as Pee-wee and reused the set of Pee-wee's Playhouse (albeit slightly modified) for a short sketch on Funny or Die. In the sketch, Pee-wee comes home and shows off a brand-new iPad given to him by Steve Jobs. This leads to a long argument between him and his puppet friends, who point out all of the iPad's disadvantages – even Conky himself points out its flaws by stating that "it looks like a giant iPhone". In the end, Pee-wee uses the iPad as a serving tray to hold glasses of milk and lemonade during a party being held at the Playhouse hours later. All the voices of the puppet characters are dubbed in by different actors than the TV series, except for Globey whose voice is still done by George McGrath.

== Personal life ==
Reubens never married or had children. In interviews conducted for the documentary Pee-wee as Himself (2025), which premiered after Reubens's death, he publicly acknowledged for the first time that he was gay. Reubens described a live-in relationship he had in the 1970s with a fellow CalArts student named Guy Brown, whom he credited with inspiring some of Pee-wee Herman's mannerisms. After the relationship ended, Reubens visited Brown in the hospital just hours before he died of an AIDS-related illness. Following that relationship, Reubens stated that he made a conscious decision to focus on his career, and never entered into another serious relationship except at the very end of his life. He was highly secretive about his sexuality for much of his lifetime: "I was out of the closet, and then I went back in the closet. I wasn't pursuing the Paul Reubens career; I was pursuing the Pee-wee Herman career. [...] I was secretive about my sexuality even to my friends [out of] self-hatred or self-preservation. I was conflicted about sexuality. But fame was way more complicated."

Reubens maintained several platonic friendships with women, including some of his co-stars, some of which were incorrectly reported in the media as romantic. He attended the 1988 Academy Awards with Big Top Pee-wee co-star Valeria Golino, which stirred rumors that the two were dating. The following year, Reubens exchanged vows with Doris Duke's adopted daughter, Chandi Heffner, at a mock wedding over which Imelda Marcos presided, held at Shangri-La, Doris Duke's mansion in Honolulu, Hawaii. Reubens also dated actress Debi Mazar in 1993 after he began attending film premieres with her. He credited Mazar with helping him recover from depression caused by his 1991 arrest. According to Mazar, their relationship was platonic yet inseparable: "we were best friends, and the truth of the matter is, basically, we had a love affair that was just cerebral." Reubens and his co-star Lynne Marie Stewart remained close, platonic friends until the end of his life. They were active with the Make-A-Wish Foundation, making appearances in character to bring joy to terminally ill children.

== Legal issues ==
=== 1991 arrest ===
In July 1991, Reubens was arrested in Sarasota, Florida, for indecent exposure while watching a film at an adult movie theater. During an unexpected police inspection, a detective detained Reubens, along with three others, as he was preparing to leave. When detectives examined his driver's license, Reubens told them "I'm Pee-wee Herman" and offered to perform a children's benefit for the sheriff's office "to take care of this". The next day, after a local reporter recognized Reubens's name, Reubens's attorney extended the same offer to the Sarasota Herald-Tribune in exchange for withholding the story. On the night of the arrest, Reubens traveled to Nashville, where his sister and lawyer lived, and then to New Jersey, where he stayed for the next few months at his friend Doris Duke's estate.

It was Reubens's third arrest in the county. In 1971, he had been arrested in the same county for loitering and prowling near an adult theater, though charges were dropped. His second arrest occurred in 1983, and Reubens was placed on two years of probation for possession of marijuana, although adjudication was withheld.

The 1991 arrest was widely covered and Reubens became the subject of late-night talk show ridicule. Disney-MGM Studios suspended a video from its studio tour that had shown Pee-wee explaining how voiceover tracks are produced. Toys "R" Us removed Pee-wee toys from its stores.

Reubens released a statement denying the charges. On November 7, 1991, he pleaded no contest. The plea avoided a charge on Reubens's record but obligated him to 75 hours of community service. As part of his service, he created, produced, and financed two antidrug public service announcements.

Despite the negative publicity, many artists who knew Reubens, such as Cyndi Lauper, Annette Funicello, Zsa Zsa Gabor, and Valeria Golino, voiced support. Others who knew Reubens, such as Pee-wee's Playhouse production designer Gary Panter, S. Epatha Merkerson, and Big Top Pee-wee director Randal Kleiser, also spoke in support. Reubens's fans organized support rallies after CBS canceled the reruns, picketing in Los Angeles, New York, and San Francisco. The television news magazine A Current Affair received "tens of thousands" of responses to a Pee-wee telephone survey in which callers supported Reubens by a nine-to-one ratio.

Although Reubens did not offer interviews or appear on talk shows after his arrest, he did appear in character as Pee-wee Herman at the 1991 MTV Video Music Awards on September 5, asking the audience, "Heard any good jokes lately?" He received a standing ovation. Reubens appeared as Pee-wee only once in 1992, when he participated in a Grand Ole Opry tribute to Minnie Pearl.

=== 2002–2004: Subsequent charges ===
In November 2002, while filming David LaChapelle's video for Elton John's "This Train Don't Stop There Anymore", Reubens learned that police were at his home with a search warrant. Police were acting on a tip from actor Jeffrey Jones (at the time facing his own child pornography charges), finding among over 70,000 items of kitsch memorabilia, two grainy videotapes, and dozens of photographs that the city attorney's office characterized as a collection of "child pornography." Kelly Bush, Reubens's personal representative at the time, said the description of the items was inaccurate and stated the objects were "Rob Lowe's sex videotape", and a few 30- to 100-year-old kitsch collectible images."

Reubens turned himself in to the Hollywood division of the Los Angeles Police Department (LAPD) and was charged with misdemeanor possession of obscene material improperly depicting a child under the age of 18 in sexual conduct. The district attorney looked at Reubens's collection and computer and found no grounds for bringing any felony charges against him, while the city attorney, Rocky Delgadillo, formally charged Reubens on the last day allowed by statute. Reubens was represented by Hollywood criminal defense lawyer Blair Berk.

One thing I want to make very, very clear, I don't want anyone for one second to think that I am titillated by images of children. It's not me. You can say lots of things about me. And you might. The public may think I'm weird. They may think I'm crazy or anything that anyone wants to think about me. That's all fine. As long as one of the things you're not thinking about me is that I'm a pedophile. Because that's not true.

— Paul Reubens on the criminal charges made against him in 2002

In December, he pleaded not guilty through Berk. In March 2004, child pornography charges were dropped in exchange for Reubens's guilty plea to a lesser misdemeanor obscenity charge. For the next three years, he was required to register his address with the sheriff's office, and he could not be in the company of minors without the permission of their parent or legal guardian.

Reubens later stated that he was a collector of erotica, including films, muscle magazines, and a sizable collection of mostly homosexual vintage erotica, such as photographic studies of teen nudes. Reubens said that what the city attorney's office viewed as pornography he considered to be innocent art, and whether the memorabilia were pornographic images "depends on what one sees in those images". Reubens described the nude images as people "one hundred percent not" performing sexual acts.

Being an avid collector, Reubens often purchased bulk lots, and one of his vintage magazine dealers declared that "there's no way" he could have known the content of each page in the publications he bought, and the dealer recalled Reubens asking for "physique magazines, vintage [1960s] material, but not things featuring kids".

During this time, Reubens spent two years in Sarasota, Florida, caring for his terminally ill father who died of cancer in February 2004. In the 2025 documentary Pee-wee as Himself, publicist Kelly Bush Novak recalls "I got a call from Paul and he told me it absolutely wasn't true. He knew Jeffrey Jones and Jeffrey Jones was being accused of... improprieties and that person who accused him had been to Paul's house with Jeffrey and other people. And that person accused Paul of possession of child pornography."

== Reception and legacy ==
Reubens had not always thought of his character as one for children prior to the mid-1980s, when he became more selective of what should and should not be associated with Pee-wee. He was a heavy smoker and hired security to make sure that children never saw him with a cigarette while in costume. He refused to endorse candy bars and other unhealthy food; he said in 1999 that he had proposed "Ralston Purina Pee-wee Chow cereal", but the sugar-free product was not released due to a negative reaction in a blind taste test.

Pee-wee was awarded a star on the Hollywood Walk of Fame by 1989, and successfully built a Pee-wee franchise, with toys, clothes, and other items generating more than $25 million at its peak in 1988. Reubens also published a book as Pee-wee in 1989 called Travels with Pee-Wee. CBS aired reruns of Playhouse until July 1991, when Reubens was arrested, pulling from their schedule the last two remaining reruns. Fox Family Channel briefly aired reruns of the Playhouse in 1998. In early July 2006, Cartoon Network began running a teaser promo during its Adult Swim lineup. A later press release and many other promos confirmed that the show's 45 original episodes would air nightly from Monday to Thursday starting on that date. Playhouse attracted 1.5 million viewers nightly. In 2007, TV Guide named Playhouse one of the top 10 TV cult classics of all time. Several children's television personas cite Pee-wee Herman as an inspiration, including Steve Burns of Blue's Clues and Stephen Hillenburg of SpongeBob SquarePants. In November 2004, all 45 episodes of the Playhouse, plus six episodes that had never before been released on home video, were released on DVD split between two box set collections. On July 3, 2013, Shout! Factory announced that they had acquired the rights to the entire series from Reubens, which was released on Blu-ray on October 21, 2014. In addition, the entire series was digitally remastered from the original 35mm film elements and original audio tracks.

Pee-wee's tight-fitting Glen plaid suits have made him a "style icon", with fashion houses and designers like Christopher Bailey, Ennio Capasa, Miuccia Prada, Viktor & Rolf, and Thom Browne creating tightly cut suits with high armholes and short trousers that have been compared to Pee-wee's.

Reubens discussed plans for a museum, which would contain many of the Playhouse sets and props he owned.

A two-part documentary series on Reubens's life, Pee-wee as Himself, was released on HBO and Max on May 23, 2025. Reubens took part in the filming of the documentary prior to his death in 2023. The documentary won a Primetime Emmy in 2025 for Outstanding Documentary or Nonfiction Special.

Reubens reportedly completed writing his autobiography before his death which his estate hopes to publish posthumously.

== Death ==
Reubens died on July 30, 2023, at the age of 70, at Cedars-Sinai Medical Center in Los Angeles. The immediate cause of his death was acute hypoxic respiratory failure. At the time of his death, he was diagnosed with both myelogenous leukemia and metastatic lung cancer. He had been diagnosed six years earlier, but had not revealed his diagnosis to the public.

Following his death, a statement written by Reubens was released:

Please accept my apology for not going public with what I've been facing the last six years. I have always felt a huge amount of love and respect from my friends, fans and supporters. I have loved you all so much and enjoyed making art for you.

Reubens was cremated, and his remains were interred at Hollywood Forever Cemetery.

== Filmography ==
=== Film ===
Year	Title	Role	Notes
1980	Pray TV	Jack Chudnowski	
1980	Midnight Madness	Pinball City Proprietor	
1980	The Blues Brothers	Chez Paul waiter	
1980	Cheech and Chong's Next Movie	Pee-wee Herman/Desk Clerk	
1981	Nice Dreams	Howie Hamburger Dude	
1981	Dream On!		
1982	Pandemonium	Johnson	
1984	Meatballs Part II	Albert / Hara Krishna	
1985	Pee-wee's Big Adventure	Pee-wee Herman	Also writer; credited as Pee-wee Herman
1986	Flight of the Navigator	Trimaxion/Max	Voice; credited as Paul Mall
1987	Back to the Beach	Pee-wee Herman	
1988	Big Top Pee-wee	Pee-wee Herman	Also writer and producer Nominated — Nickelodeon Kids' Choice Awards for Favorite Movie Actor; credited as Pee-wee Herman
1992	Batman Returns	Tucker Cobblepot	
1992	Buffy the Vampire Slayer	Amilyn	
1993	The Nightmare Before Christmas	Lock	Voice
1996	Dunston Checks In	Buck LaFarge	
1996	Matilda	FBI Agent Bob	
1997	Buddy	Professor Spatz	
1997	Beauty and the Beast: The Enchanted Christmas	Fife	Voice, direct-to-video
1998	Dr. Dolittle	Raccoon	Voice
1999	Mystery Men	The Spleen	
2000	South of Heaven, West of Hell	Arvid Henry	
2001	Blow	Derek Foreal	
2004	Teacher's Pet	Dennis	Voice
2006	The Tripper	Frank Baker	
2007	Reno 911!: Miami	Sir Terrence Benedino	
2009	Life During Wartime	Andy	
2011	The Smurfs	Jokey Smurf	Voice
2013	The Smurfs 2	Jokey Smurf	Voice
2013	Tom and Jerry's Giant Adventure	Screwy Squirrel	Voice, direct-to-video
2013	Scooby-Doo! Mecha Mutt Menace	Irv	Voice, direct-to-video
2015	Accidental Love	Edwin	
2016	Pee-wee's Big Holiday	Pee-wee Herman	Also writer and producer; credited as Pee-wee Herman
2023	Quiz Lady	Himself	Posthumous release (Final film role)

=== Television ===
Year	Title	Role	Notes
1979	Working Stiffs	Heimlich	2 episodes
1980–1981	The Flintstone Comedy Show	Freaky Frankenstone	Voice, 18 episodes (The Frankenstones segment)
1980	Steve Martin: Comedy Is Not Pretty	Various roles	Television special
1980	Steve Martin: All Commercials	Various roles	Television special
1981	Mork & Mindy	Dickie Nimitz	Episode: "Long Before We Met"
1981	The Pee-wee Herman Show	Pee-wee Herman	Television special
1982	Madame's Place	Himself	Season: 1 Episode: 34
1984	Faerie Tale Theatre	Pinocchio	Season: 3 Episode: 3 "Pinocchio"
1984	Cheeseball Presents	Pee-wee Herman	TV movie
1984–1985	Lucky Luke	Rantanplan	Voice, 26 episodes
1985	Saturday Night Live	Pee-wee Herman (host)	Episode: "Pee-wee Herman/Queen Ida & The Bon Temps Zydeco Band"
1986–1990	Pee-wee's Playhouse	Pee-wee Herman	45 episodes; also creator, writer, director, executive producer and set decorator Daytime Emmy Award for Outstanding Achievement in Art Direction/Set Direction/Scenic Design (1988); Daytime Emmy Award for Outstanding Achievement in Graphics and Title Design (1991); Nominated – Daytime Emmy Award for Outstanding Performer in Children's Programming (1987–1988, 1990–1991); Nominated – Daytime Emmy Award for Outstanding Children's Series (1987, 1990–1991); Nominated – Daytime Emmy Award for Outstanding Writing For A Children's Series (1987–1988); Nominated – Daytime Emmy Award for Outstanding Directing For A Children's Series (1988, 1990–1991); Nominated – Daytime Emmy Award for Outstanding Achievement in Art Direction/Set Decoration/Scenic Design (1989–1991)
1987	227	Pee-wee Herman	Episode: "Toyland"
1988	Sesame Street	Pee-wee Herman	Episode: "Put Down the Duckie"
1988	Pee-wee's Playhouse Christmas Special	Pee-wee Herman	Television special; also writer, director and executive producer
1995–1997	Murphy Brown	Andrew J. Lansing III	6 episodes Nominated – Primetime Emmy Award for Outstanding Guest Actor in a Comedy Series (1995)
2000	Everybody Loves Raymond	Russell	Episode: "Hackidu"
2001	You Don't Know Jack	Troy Stevens	6 episodes
2001	Ally McBeal	Louis	Episode: "Cloudy Skies, Chance of Parade"
2002	Rugrats	Hermie the Elf	Voice, episode: "Babies in Toyland"
2002	The Groovenians	Jet	Voice; pilot
2005	Tripping the Rift	God / Devil	Voice, episode: "Chode's Near Death-Experience"
2006	Campus Ladies	Drama instructor	Episode: "Drama Class"
2006	Reno 911!	Rick	Episode: "Rick's On It"
2006	Re-Animated	Golly Gopher	Voice, television film
2007	Area 57	Alien	Pilot
2007	30 Rock	Gerhardt Hapsburg	Episode: "Black Tie"
2007	Dirt	Chuck Lafoon	3 episodes
2007	Tim and Eric Awesome Show, Great Job!	The Moon	Episode: "Cats"
2007	Pushing Daisies	Oscar Vibenius	2 episodes
2007–2009	Chowder	Reuben	Voice, 3 episodes
2009–2011	Batman: The Brave and the Bold	Bat-Mite	Voice, 4 episodes
2010	Adventure Time	Gnome Ruler, Dancing Bug	Voice, episode: "Power Animal"
2010	WWE Raw	Pee-wee Herman	1 episode; special guest
2011	The Pee-wee Herman Show on Broadway	Pee-wee Herman	Television special Nominated – Primetime Emmy Award for Outstanding Variety, Music, or Comedy Special
2012–2013	Tron: Uprising	Pavel	Voice, 17 episodes
2012–2015	Robot Chicken	The Riddler / Sunbather	Voice, 3 episodes
2013	Comedy Bang! Bang!	Pee-wee Herman	Episode: "Pee Wee Herman Wears a Halloween Costume"
2014	Teenage Mutant Ninja Turtles	Martin Milton/Sir Malachi	Voice, episode: "Mazes and Mutants"
2014	Sanjay and Craig	Benji Warlin	Voice, episode: "Googas"
2014	Star Wars Rebels	RX-24	Voice, episode: "Droids in Distress"
2014	Lego DC Comics: Batman Be-Leaguered	Bat-Mite	Voice, television film
2014	Kung Fu Panda: Legends of Awesomeness	Ju Long	Voice, episode: "The Hunger Game"
2014; 2016	American Dad!	Wyatt Borden	Voice, episode: "Blagsnarst, a Love Story"
2014–2015	The Blacklist	Mr. Vargas	5 episodes
2015	Portlandia	Weirdos' Lawyer	Episode: "Dead Pets"
2015	Turbo Fast	Tycho	Voice, episode: "Turboldly Go"
2015	Phineas and Ferb	Professor Parenthesis	Voice, episode: "The O.W.C.A. Files"
2015–2016	Pickle and Peanut	Couch Dracula	Voice, 2 episodes
2015–2017	Penn Zero: Part-Time Hero	Milk Man, Butterman	Voice, 3 episodes
2016–2017	Gotham	Elijah Van Dahl	3 episodes
2017–2018	Voltron: Legendary Defender	Unliu Swap Shop Owner	Voice, 3 episodes
2018	Mosaic	JC Schiffer	7 episodes
2018–2019	Legends of Tomorrow	Dybbuk	Voice, 5 episodes
2019	Tigtone	Cryptomb	Voice, episode: "Tigtone and the Cemetery of the Dead"
2019	What We Do in the Shadows	Paul	Episode: "The Trial"
2019	The Conners	Sandy Bitensky	Episode: "Lanford, Toilet of Sin"
2021	The Tom and Jerry Show	Pontius Pig	Voice, episode: "Sock It to Me"
2023	Bob's Burgers	Pat	Voice, episode: "Amelia" (Final role; dedicated in memory)
2025	Pee-wee as Himself	Himself	Two-part documentary series Posthumous release Primetime Emmy Award for Outstanding Documentary or Nonfiction Special

=== Video games ===
Year	Title	Voice role
2004	The Nightmare Before Christmas: Oogie's Revenge	Lock
2015	Minecraft: Story Mode	Ivor
2016	Call of Duty: Infinite Warfare	Willard Wyler
2017	Minecraft: Story Mode - Season 2	Ivor

== Awards and nominations ==
Year	Award	Category	Work	Result
1987	Daytime Emmy	Outstanding Children's Series	Pee-wee's Playhouse	Nominated
1987	Daytime Emmy	Outstanding Performer in Children's Programming	Pee-wee's Playhouse	Nominated
1987	Daytime Emmy	Outstanding Writing in a Children's Series	Pee-wee's Playhouse	Nominated
1988	Daytime Emmy	Outstanding Directing in Children's Programming	Pee-wee's Playhouse	Nominated
1988	Daytime Emmy	Outstanding Writing in a Children's Series	Pee-wee's Playhouse	Nominated
1988	Daytime Emmy	Outstanding Children's Series	Pee-wee's Playhouse	Nominated
1988	Daytime Emmy	Outstanding Performer in Children's Programming	Pee-wee's Playhouse	Nominated
1988	Daytime Emmy	Outstanding Achievement in Art Direction/Set Direction/Scenic Design	Pee-wee's Playhouse	Won
1989	Daytime Emmy	Outstanding Achievement in Art Direction/Set Direction/Scenic Design	Pee-wee's Playhouse	Nominated
1989	Kids Choice Awards	Favorite Movie Actor	Big Top Pee-wee	Nominated
1990	Daytime Emmy	Outstanding Children's Series	Pee-wee's Playhouse	Nominated
1990	Daytime Emmy	Outstanding Performer in a Children's Series	Pee-wee's Playhouse	Nominated
1990	Daytime Emmy	Outstanding Directing in a Children's Series	Pee-wee's Playhouse	Nominated
1990	Daytime Emmy	Outstanding Achievement in Art Direction/Set Decoration/Scenic Design	Pee-wee's Playhouse	Nominated
1991	Daytime Emmy	Outstanding Directing in a Children's Series	Pee-wee's Playhouse	Nominated
1991	Daytime Emmy	Outstanding Children's Series	Pee-wee's Playhouse	Nominated
1991	Daytime Emmy	Outstanding Performer in a Children's Series	Pee-wee's Playhouse	Nominated
1991	Daytime Emmy	Outstanding Graphics and Title Design	Pee-wee's Playhouse	Won
1995	Primetime Emmy	Outstanding Guest Actor in a Comedy Series	Murphy Brown	Nominated
1996	Viewers for Quality Television	Best Recurring Player	Murphy Brown	Nominated
2007	Gold Derby Awards	Best Comedy Guest Actor	30 Rock	Nominated
2008	Online Film & Television Association	Best Guest Actor in a Comedy Series	Pushing Daisies	Won
2010	Gotham Awards	Best Ensemble Performance	Life During Wartime	Nominated
2011	Primetime Emmy	Outstanding Variety, Music or Comedy Special	The Pee-Wee Herman Show on Broadway	Nominated
2011	NAVGTR Awards	Supporting Performance in a Comedy	Batman Brave and the Bold	Won
2016	Behind the Voice Actor Awards	Best Male Vocal Performance in a Television Series in a Guest Role	Penn Zero: Part Time Hero	Won
2025	Primetime Emmy	Outstanding Documentary or Nonfiction Special	Pee-Wee as Himself	Won
2026	Film Independent Spirit Awards	Best New Non-Scripted or Documentary Series	Pee-Wee as Himself	Won

- Awarded a star on the Hollywood Walk of Fame in 1988 as Pee-wee Herman
