= Cesar Romero =

American actor (1907–1994)

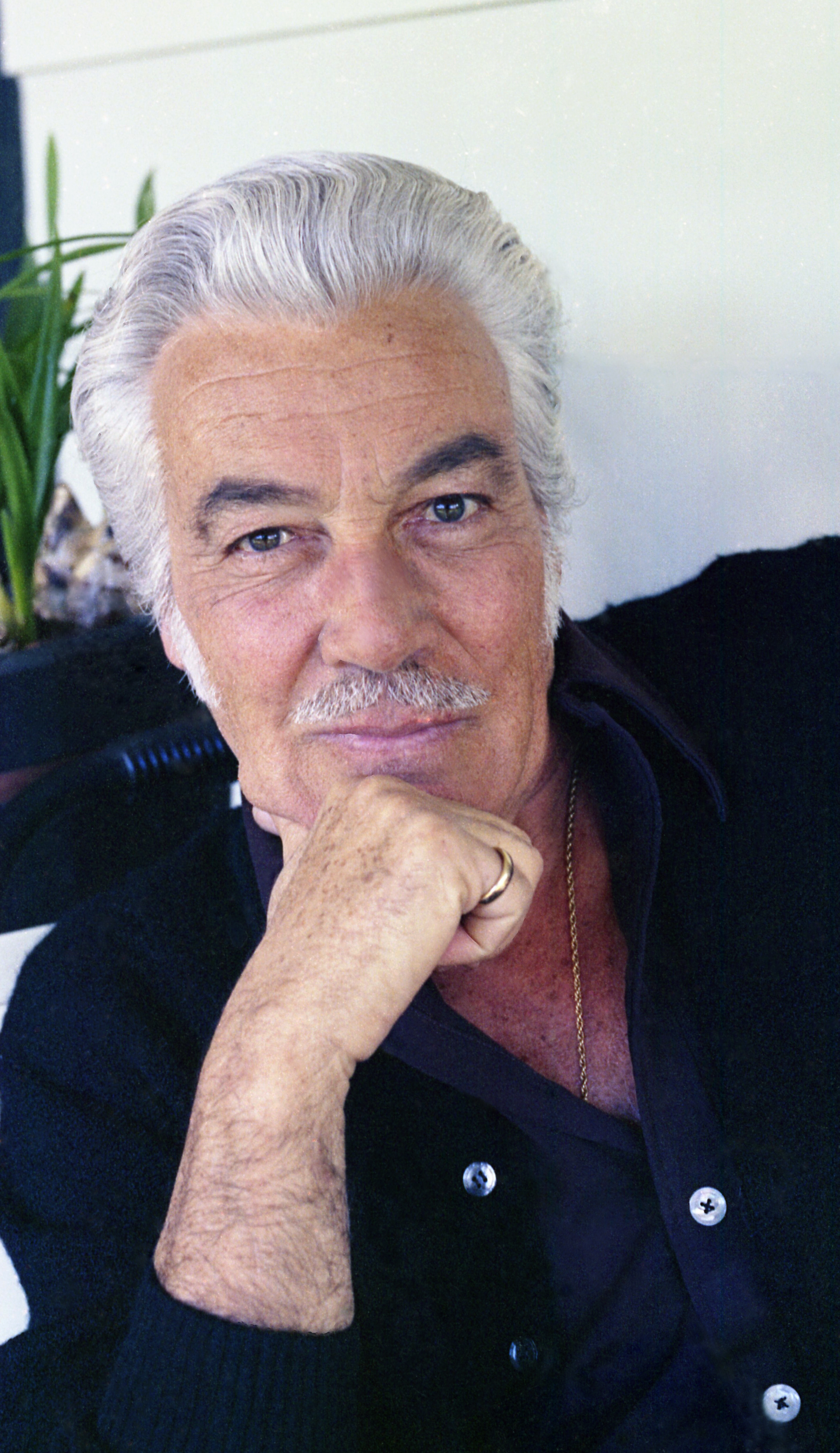
- Romero in 1973
- Born: César Julio Romero Jr. February 15, 1907; New York, New York, U.S.
- Died: January 1, 1994 (aged 86); Santa Monica, California, U.S.
- Resting place: Inglewood Park Cemetery, Inglewood, California, U.S.
- Other names: Butch; The Latin from Manhattan
- Occupation: Actor
- Years active: 1927–1994
- Political party: Republican
- Relatives: Emerson Romero (first cousin)
- Military career
- Allegiance: United States
- Branch: United States Coast Guard
- Service years: 1942–1945
- Rank: Chief petty officer
- Conflicts: World War II

César Julio Romero Jr. (February 15, 1907 – January 1, 1994) was an American actor whose career spanned over 6 decades. He was active in film, radio, and television. His wide range of screen roles included Latin lovers, historical figures in costume dramas, characters in light domestic comedies, and the Joker on the live-action Batman television series of the mid-1960s, who was included in TV Guide's 2013 list of the 60 nastiest villains of all time. Romero was the first actor to play the character.

== Early life ==
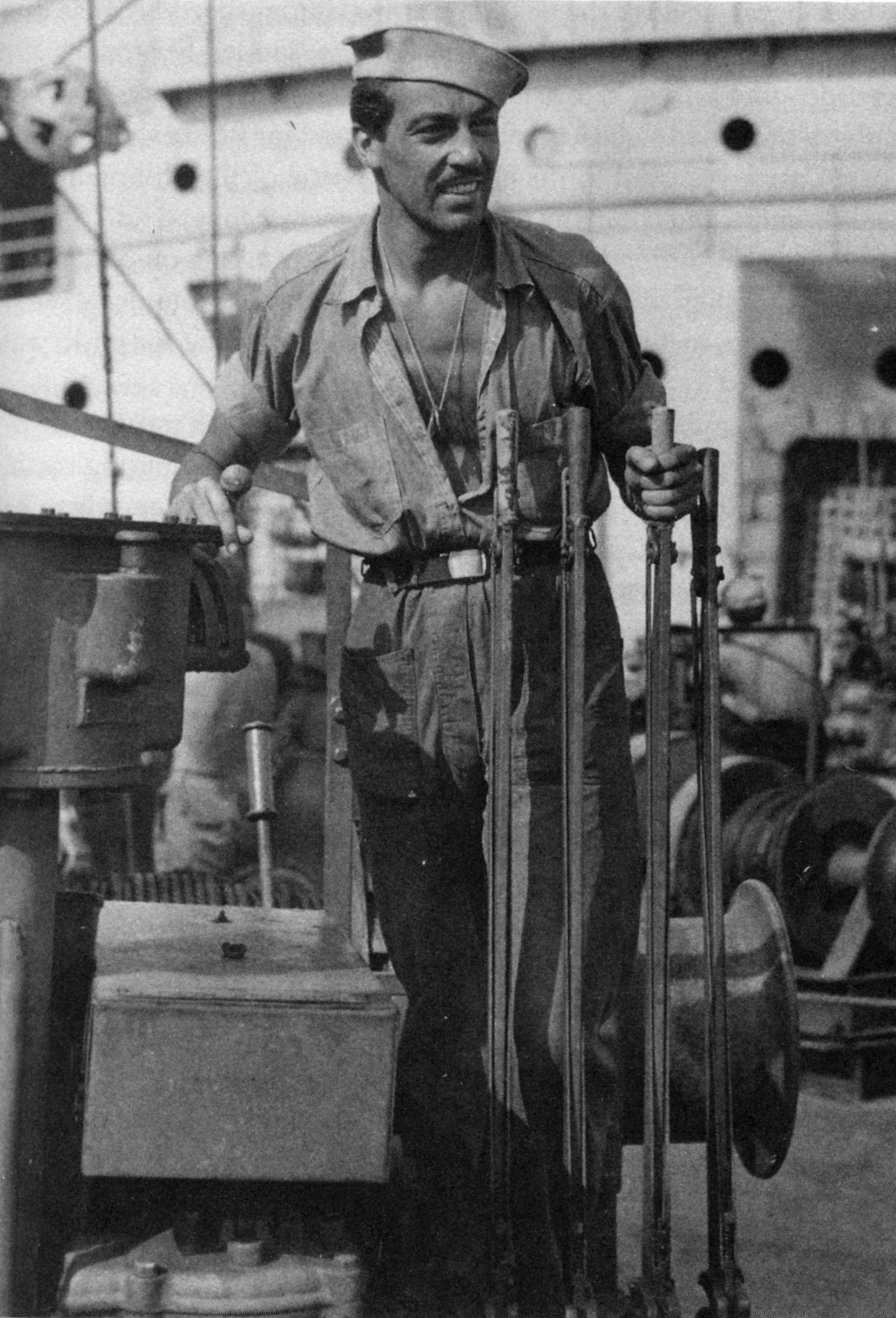
Romero as part of the deck crew aboard the USS Cavalier, c. 1944

César Julio Romero Jr. was born in New York City on February 15, 1907, the son of César Julio Romero Sr. (1872–1951) and María Mantilla (1880–1962). His mother was a concert singer and said to be the biological daughter of Cuban national hero José Martí. His father was born in Barcelona and immigrated to the United States in 1888, where he was an import/export merchant. He was a first cousin of silent film star Emerson Romero, who was a few years older than César and came to New York in 1907 to attend a school for the deaf.

Romero grew up in Bradley Beach, New Jersey, and went to Bradley Beach Elementary School, Asbury Park High School, the Collegiate School, and the Riverdale Country Day School. After his parents lost their sugar-import business and suffered losses in the Wall Street crash of 1929, Romero's Hollywood earnings allowed him to support his large family, all of whom followed him to the American West Coast years later. Romero, who referred to himself as "a Latin from Manhattan", lived on and off with various family members for the rest of his life.

On October 12, 1942, he enlisted in the United States Coast Guard as an apprentice seaman and served in the Pacific Theater of Operations. He reported aboard the Coast Guard-crewed assault transport USS Cavalier in November 1943. According to a press release from the period, Romero saw action during the invasions of Tinian and Saipan. The same article mentioned that he preferred to be a regular part of the crew and was eventually promoted to the rating of chief boatswain's mate.

== Career ==
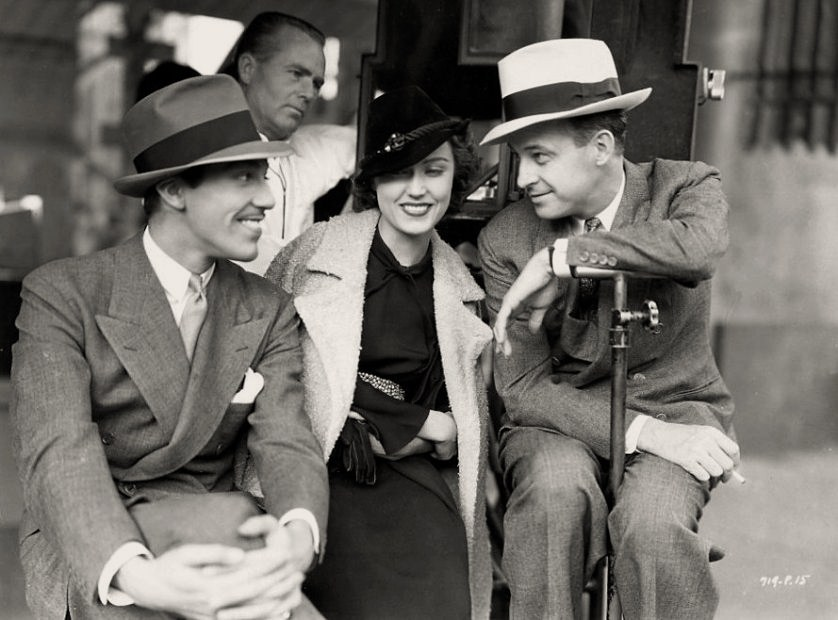
Romero, Fay Wray, director Richard Thorpe and cinematographer George Robinson (in background) on the set of Cheating Cheaters (1934)

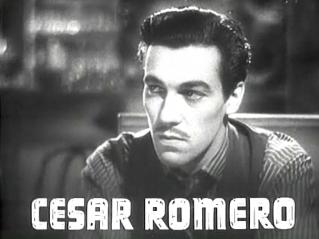
Trailer for Public Enemy's Wife (1936)

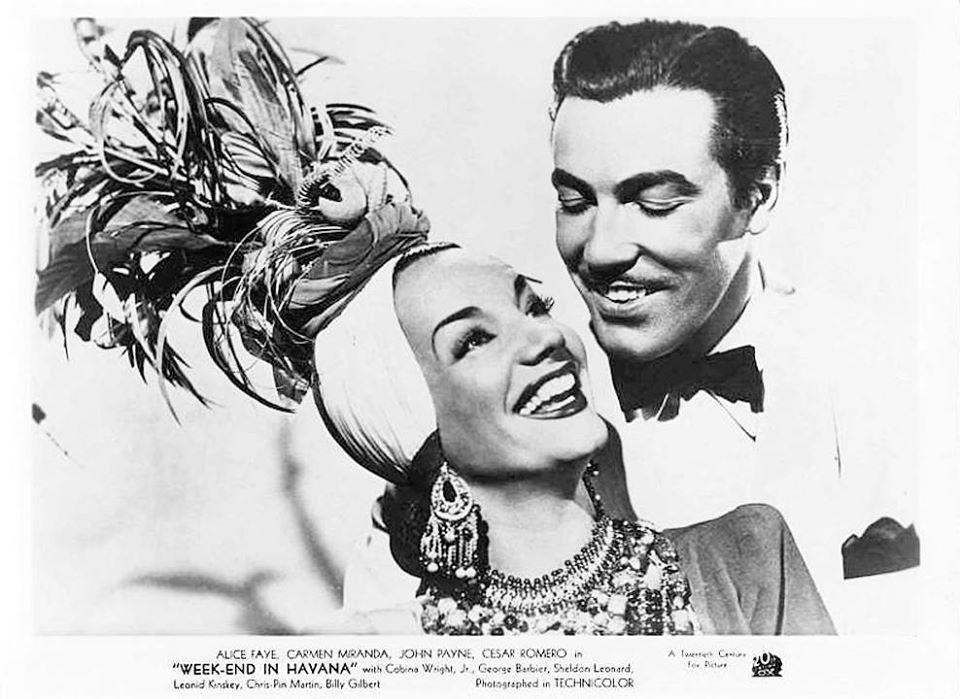
Romero with Carmen Miranda in Week-End in Havana (1941)

Romero made his debut in 1927 as a dancer in the musical Lady Do. He made his Broadway debut in 1932 as Ricci in the play Dinner at Eight which ran for more than 300 performances.6 ft 3 in (1.91 m) Romero routinely played "Latin lovers" in films from the 1930s until the 1950s, usually in supporting roles. Romero played Antonio Galvan, one of two suitors vying for Marlene Dietrich in The Devil is a Woman.

In The Thin Man (1934), Romero played a villainous supporting role opposite the film's main stars William Powell and Myrna Loy.

Many of Romero's films from this early period saw him cast in small character parts, such as Italian gangsters and East Indian princes. Romero had a lead role as the Pathan rebel leader, Khoda Khan, in John Ford's British Raj-era action film Wee Willie Winkie (1937) starring Shirley Temple and Victor McLaglen and a supporting role as the Indian servant Ram Dass in The Little Princess (1939), also with Temple.

Romero starred as the Cisco Kid in six westerns made between 1939 and 1941. He danced and performed comedy in the 20th Century Fox films he starred in opposite Carmen Miranda and Betty Grable, such as Week-End in Havana (1941) and Springtime in the Rockies (1942)..

He also played a minor role as Sinjin, a piano player in Glenn Miller's band, in the 1942 20th Century Fox musical Orchestra Wives.

Romero also appeared in a comic turn as a foil for Frank Sinatra and his crew in Ocean's 11 (1960) starring the Rat Pack (Sinatra, Dean Martin, Sammy Davis Jr., Peter Lawford and Joey Bishop).

Romero sometimes played the leading man, for example in Allan Dwan's 15 Maiden Lane (1936) opposite Claire Trevor as well as winning the key role of the Doc Holliday character (with name changed to "Doc Halliday") in Dwan's acclaimed Wyatt Earp saga Frontier Marshal (1939) starring Randolph Scott and Nancy Kelly three years later. Twentieth Century Fox, along with mogul Darryl Zanuck, selected Romero to co-star with Tyrone Power in the Technicolor historical epic Captain from Castile (1947), directed by Henry King. While Power played a fictionalized character, Romero played Hernán Cortés, a historical conquistador in Spain's conquest of the Americas.

Among almost countless television credits, Romero appeared several times on The Martha Raye Show in the mid-1950s.

He portrayed Don Diego de la Vega's maternal uncle in a number of second-season Zorro episodes.

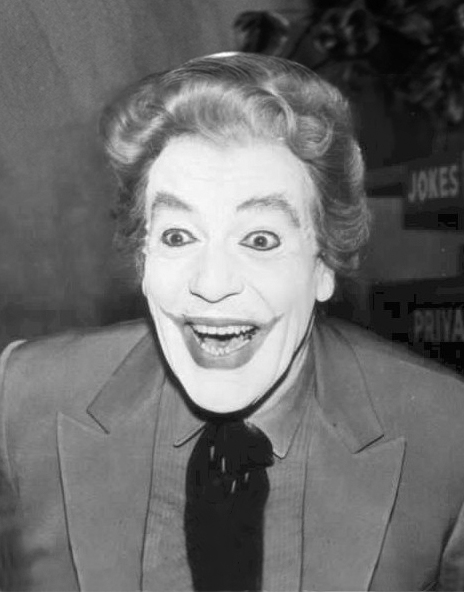
Romero in his role as the Joker on the 1960s television series Batman

In 1958, he guest-starred as Ramon Valdez in How to Marry a Millionaire in the episode entitled "The Big Order". He performed the mambo with Gisele MacKenzie on her NBC variety show, The Gisele MacKenzie Show. He guest-starred in 1957 on CBS's The Lucy–Desi Comedy Hour on the first episode of the seventh season ("Lucy Takes a Cruise to Havana"). He played "Don Carlos", a card sharp on the episode, "The Honorable Don Charlie Story" of NBC's Wagon Train. On January 16, 1958, he appeared on The Ford Show, Starring Tennessee Ernie Ford. In 1959, Romero was cast as Joaquin in the episode "Caballero" from The Texan, and on September 26 of that year, he hosted the Cuban installment of John Gunther's High Road.

In 1960, he was cast as Ricky Valenti in "Crime of Passion" from Pete and Gladys. In 1965, Romero played the head of THRUSH in France in "The Never Never Affair" from The Man from U.N.C.L.E..

From 1966 to 1968, he portrayed the Joker on Batman. He refused to shave his moustache for the role, and so the supervillain's white face makeup was simply smeared over it throughout the series' run and in the 1966 film.

His guest star work in the 1970s included a recurring role on the western comedy Alias Smith and Jones as Señor Armendariz, a Mexican rancher feuding with Patrick McCreedy (Burl Ives), the owner of a ranch on the opposite side of the border. He appeared in three episodes. Romero later portrayed Peter Stavros on Falcon Crest (from 1985 to 1987).

He also appeared in a sixth-season episode of The Golden Girls, where he played a suitor named Tony Delvecchio for Sophia (Estelle Getty).

Apart from these television roles, Romero appeared as A.J. Arno, a small-time criminal who continually opposes Dexter Riley (played by Kurt Russell) and his schoolmates of Medfield College in a series of films by Walt Disney Productions in the 1970s.

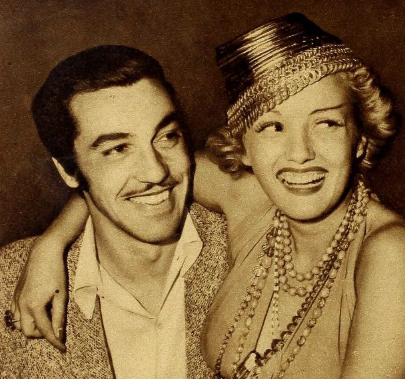
Romero with actress Phyllis Brooks on set of Dangerously Yours (1937)

== Political activities ==
A registered Republican, Romero appeared in the Nixon-Lodge bumper sticker motorcade campaign in October 1960. Four years later, Romero initially supported Henry Cabot Lodge Jr. in the write-in campaign supporting Lodge for president. Romero appreciated and said he liked Lodge's strong anti-Communist stance in South Vietnam where Lodge was at the time the United States ambassador. During 1964, Romero supported Barry Goldwater in the general election.

Also in 1964, Romero was very involved in the U.S. Senate race in California that pitted one of Romero's best friends and fellow actor, Republican nominee George Murphy (who nicknamed Romero "Butch"), in his successful bid to oust then-Senator Pierre Salinger, a Democrat.

The Senate race was a heated contest where Salinger had already narrowly defeated then-California State Controller Alan Cranston, who would become a senator in 1968, in the Democratic primary. Both men had "primaried" Senator Clair Engle, who had sought re-nomination despite being terminally ill with a brain tumor; Engle died less than two months after the primary. Then-Democratic Governor Pat Brown appointed Salinger instead of Cranston to fill the vacancy; although the appointment seemed reasonable since Salinger had won the primary, it was roundly criticized by Romero and Murphy as cronyism since Salinger had been the White House press secretary for the late President John F. Kennedy, a close ally of Brown. Romero appealed to disappointed Cranston backers after the primary to support Murphy. Romero's urging helped Salinger lose a race no one thought could be lost.

Murphy lost the full use of his voice during his term when part of his larynx was removed due to throat cancer. Romero implored other Hollywood stars to try to help Murphy win re-election in 1970. However, Murphy lost re-election to John V. Tunney, the son of boxing legend Gene Tunney.

After Murphy's Senate defeat, Romero scaled back his involvement in politics but would take part for a Hollywood friend, such as Ronald Reagan in his successful gubernatorial bids in 1966 and 1970 as well as all four of his presidential bids in 1968, 1976, 1980, and 1984. Romero also joined with fellow actors and actresses in lobbying the United States Congress to present the then-dying John Wayne with a Congressional Gold Medal for his service to the nation.

== Personal life and death ==
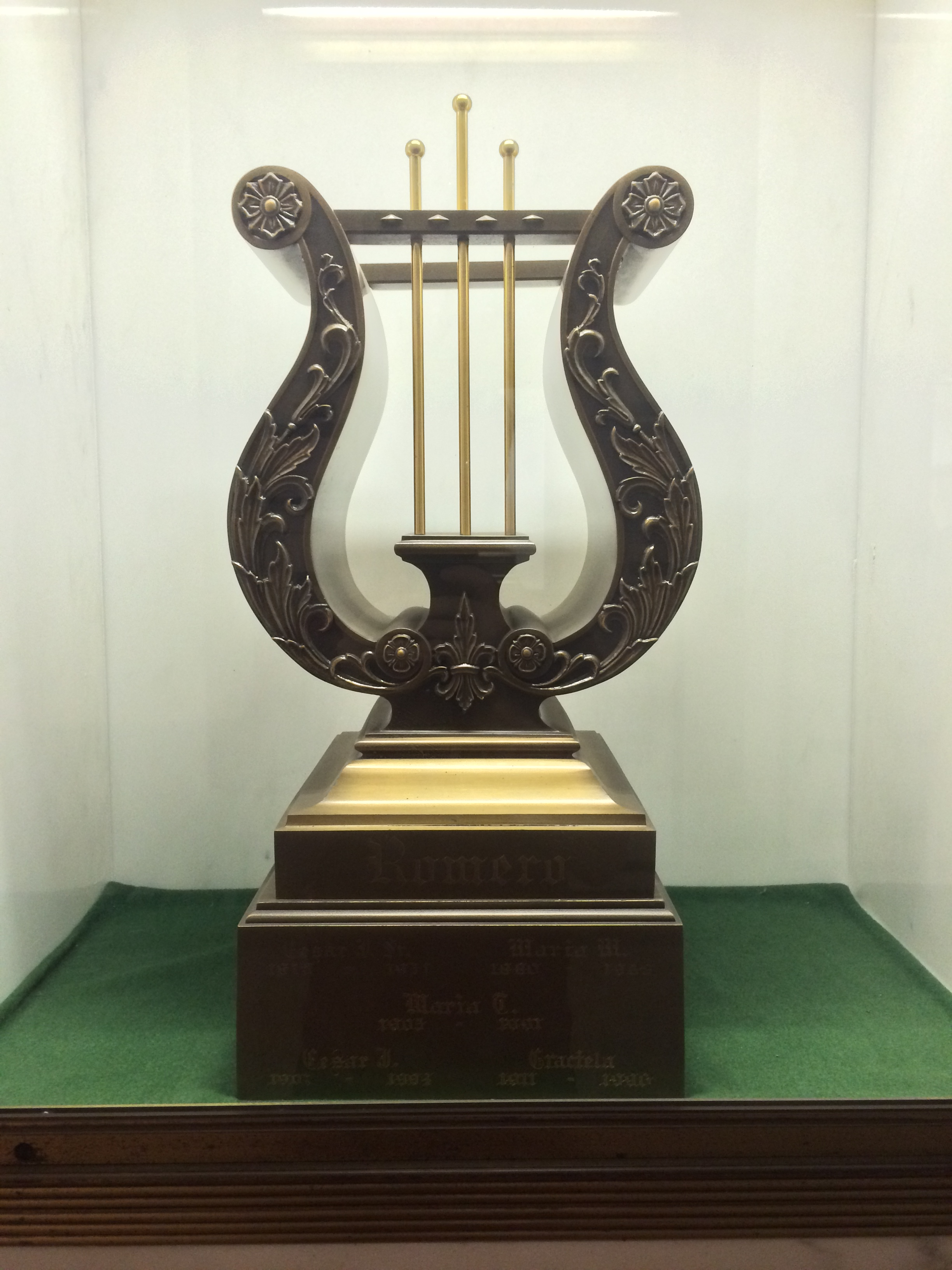
Niche of Caesar Romero at Inglewood Park Cemetery under a statue of a Terpsichorean lyre.

Romero never married and had no children. Many Hollywood historians and biographers have speculated on Romero as he was very private about his sexuality. In 1996, Boze Hadleigh wrote a book, Hollywood Gays, containing a series of claimed interviews in which Romero allegedly came out. Romero died two years before the book was released, and while many of the interviews in the book are disputed as possible forgeries, many are not disputed.

Romero died the night of January 1, 1994 at the age of 86 from complications of a blood clot while being treated for bronchitis and pneumonia at Saint John's Health Center in Santa Monica, California.

His body was cremated and the ashes were interred at Inglewood Park Cemetery, Inglewood, California.

For his contributions to the motion picture and television industry, Romero has a star on the Hollywood Walk of Fame at 6615 Hollywood Boulevard for film and another star at 1719 Vine Street for television.

== Filmography ==
=== Film ===
Year	Title	Role	Notes
1933	The Shadow Laughs	Tony Rico	
1934	The Thin Man	Chris Jorgenson	
1934	British Agent	Tito Del Val	
1934	Cheating Cheaters	Tom Palmer	
1934	Strange Wives	Boris	
1935	Clive of India	Mir Jaffar	
1935	A Dream Comes True	Himself	Uncredited
1935	The Good Fairy	Joe	
1935	Cardinal Richelieu	Andre de Pons	
1935	The Devil Is a Woman	Antonio Galvan	
1935	Hold 'Em Yale	Gigolo Georgie	
1935	Diamond Jim	Jerry Richardson	
1935	Metropolitan	Niki Baroni	
1935	Nieterstein		
1935	Show Them No Mercy!	Tobey	
1936	Love Before Breakfast	Bill Wadsworth	
1936	Nobody's Fool	Dizzy Rantz	
1936	Public Enemy's Wife	Gene Maroc	
1936	15 Maiden Lane	Frank Peyton	
1937	She's Dangerous	Nick Sheldon / Al Shaw	
1937	Armored Car	Petack	
1937	Wee Willie Winkie	Khoda Khan	
1937	Dangerously Yours	Victor Morell	
1937	Ali Baba Goes to Town	Himself	Uncredited
1938	Happy Landing	Duke Sargent	
1938	Always Goodbye	Count Giovanni 'Gino' Corini	
1938	My Lucky Star	George Cabot Jr	
1938	Five of a Kind	Duke Lester	
1939	Wife, Husband and Friend	Hugo	
1939	The Little Princess	Ram Dass	
1939	The Return of the Cisco Kid	Lopez	
1939	Frontier Marshal	Doc Halliday	
1939	Charlie Chan at Treasure Island	Rhadini	
1939	The Cisco Kid and the Lady	Cisco Kid	
1939	Hollywood Hobbies	Himself	Uncredited
1940	He Married His Wife	Freddie	
1940	Viva Cisco Kid	Cisco Kid	
1940	Lucky Cisco Kid	Cisco Kid	
1940	The Gay Caballero	Cisco Kid	
1941	Romance of the Rio Grande	Cisco Kid / Real and fake Carlos Hernandez	
1941	Tall, Dark and Handsome	J.J. 'Shep' Morrison	
1941	Ride on Vaquero	Cisco Kid	
1941	The Great American Broadcast	Bruce Chadwick	
1941	Dance Hall	Duke McKay	
1941	Week-End in Havana	Monte Blanca	
1942	A Gentleman at Heart	Tony Miller	
1942	Tales of Manhattan	Harry Wilson	
1942	Orchestra Wives	St. John 'Sinjin' Smith	
1942	Springtime in the Rockies	Victor Prince	
1943	Coney Island	Joe Rocco	
1943	Wintertime	Brad Barton	
1946	Screen Snapshots: Hollywood Victory Show	Himself	
1947	Carnival in Costa Rica	Pepe Castro	
1947	Captain from Castile	Hernán Cortés	
1948	That Lady in Ermine	Joe Sanger	
1948	Julia Misbehaves	Fred Ghenoccio	
1948	Deep Waters	Count Mario	
1949	The Beautiful Blonde from Bashful Bend	Blackie Jobero	
1949	Screen Snapshots: Motion Picture Mothers, Inc.	Himself	
1950	Love That Brute	Pretty Willie Wetzchahofsky	
1950	Once a Thief	Mitch Moore	
1951	Happy Go Lovely	John Frost	
1951	Lost Continent	Major Joe Nolan	
1951	FBI Girl	FBI Agent Glen Stedman	
1952	The Jungle	Rama Singh	
1952	Lady in the Fog	Philip 'Phil' O'Dell	
1953	The Sword of Granada	Don Pedro de Rivera	
1953	Street of Shadows	Luigi	
1953	Prisoners of the Casbah	Firouz	
1954	Vera Cruz	Marquis Henri de Labordere	
1955	The Americano	Manuel Silvera / "El Gato" / Etc.	
1955	The Racers	Carlos Chavez	
1956	The Leather Saint	Tony Lorenzo	
1956	Around the World in 80 Days	Abdullah's henchman	
1957	The Story of Mankind	Spanish Envoy	
1958	Villa!!	Tomás Lopez	
1959	My Private Secretaries	Rafael Travesi	
1960	Ocean's 11	Duke Santos	
1960	Pepe	Himself	
1961	Seven Women from Hell	Luis Hullman	
1961	The Runaway	Father Dugan	
1962	If a Man Answers	Robert Swan / Adam Wright	
1963	We Shall Return	Carlos Rodriguez	
1963	The Castilian	Jerónimo	
1963	Donovan's Reef	Marquis Andre de Lage	
1963	Saint Mike	Unknown role	
1964	A House Is Not a Home	Lucky Luciano	
1965	Two on a Guillotine	John Harley 'Duke' Duquesne	
1965	Sergeant Deadhead	Admiral Stoneham	
1965	Marriage on the Rocks	Miguel Santos	
1966	Batman	The Joker	
1968	Madigan's Millions	Mike Madigan	
1968	Hot Millions	Customs Inspector	
1968	Skidoo	Hechy	
1969	Crooks and Coronets	Nick Marco	
1969	Midas Run	Carlo Dodero	
1969	Target: Harry	Lt. George Duval	
1969	Latitude Zero	Dr. Malic / Lt. Hastings	
1969	The Computer Wore Tennis Shoes	A. J. Arno	
1969	A Talent for Loving	Don Jose	
1970	The Red, White, and Black	Col. Grierson	
1971	Once Upon a Wheel	Himself	
1971	The Last Generation	Unknown role	Archive footage
1972	The Proud and the Damned	San Carlos' Mayor	
1972	Now You See Him, Now You Don't	A. J. Arno	
1974	The Haunted Mouth	B. Plaque	Also Narrator
1975	The Strongest Man in the World	A. J. Arno	
1975	Timber Tramps	Greedy sawmill mogul	
1976	Carioca Tigre	Don Rosalindo Y Guana	
1977	Mission to Glory: A True Story	Admiral Atondo	
1979	The Spectre of Edgar Allan Poe	Dr. Richard Grimaldi	
1985	Lust in the Dust	Father Garcia	
1985	Flesh and Bullets	Judge in Santa Monica	
1988	Judgement Day	Octavio	
1988	Simple Justice	Vincenzo DiLorenzo	
1988	Mortuary Academy	Ship's Captain	
1995	Carmen Miranda: Bananas Is My Business	Himself	
1998	The Right Way	Don Genese	Final role Posthumous release

=== Television ===
Year	Title	Role	Notes
1950	The Ed Wynn Show	Himself	Episode: "Cesar Romero, Irene Hervey, Allan Jones"
1951	Stars Over Hollywood	N/A	Episode: "A Letter From Home"
1954–58	Passport to Danger	Steve McQuinn	33 episodes
1954	A Star Is Born World Premiere	Himself	Television short
1956–67	The Red Skelton Hour	Various	11 episodes
1957	Schlitz Playhouse of Stars	N/A	Episode: "Old Spanish Custom
1957	Navy Log	Himself/host	Episode: "The Beach Pounders"
1957	The Lucille Ball-Desi Arnaz Show	Carlos Garcia	Episode: "Lucy Takes a Cruise to Havana
1958	Wagon Train	Hon Don 'Charlie' Carlos de Fuentes	Episode: "The Honorable Don Charlie Story"
1959	Zorro	Esteban de la Cruz	4 episodes
1959	The Texan	Captain Joaquin Acosta	Episode: "Caballero"
1959	John Gunther's High Road	Himself	Episode: "Cuba"
1959	Death Valley Days	Don Augustin Oblivion	Episode: "Olvera"
1959	Hotel de Paree	Charlie Pendleton	Episode: "Sundance and the Violent Siege"
1959–65	Rawhide	Various	4 episodes
1960	Love and Marriage	Himself	1 episode
1960	Stagecoach West	Manolo Lalanda	Episode: "A Time To Run"
1960	Five Fingers	Ferri	Episode: "Counterfeit"
1960–61	Stagecoach West	Colonel Francisco Martinez	2 episodes
1961	Dick Powell's Zane Grey Theatre	The Man from Everywhere	Episode: "The Ballet of the Pater Bullet"
1962	The Beachcomber	Jaoquin Perez; Krasny	2 episodes
1963	Fractured Flickers	Himself	1 episode
1963	77 Sunset Strip	Lorenzo Cestari	Episode: "5: Part 4
1963–65	Burke's Law	Various	5 episodes
1964	Dr. Kildare	Dr. Paul Marino	Episode: "Onions, Garlic and Flowers That Bloom in the Spring"
1964–70	The Mike Douglas Show	Himself	Unknown episodes
1965	The Man from U.N.C.L.E.	Victor Gervais	Episode: "The Never-Never Affair"
1965	Bonanza	Guido Borelli	Episode: "The Deadliest Game"
1965	Branded	Gen. Arriola	Episode: "The Mission: Part 2"
1965	Ben Casey	Frederic Delano	Episode: "Did Your Mother Come from Ireland, Ben Casey?"
1966–69	Daniel Boone	Esteban de Vaca; Adm. Alejandro Buenaventura; Colonel Carlos Navarro	3 episodes
1966–68	Batman	The Joker	22 episodes
1967	T.H.E. Cat	Gordon Amley	Episode: "Queen of Diamonds, Knave of Hearts"
1968	Get Smart	Kinsey Krispen	Episode: "The Reluctant Redhead"
1969	Here's Lucy	Tony Rivera	Episode: "A Date for Lucy"
1970	Julia	Bunny Henderson; Bernard Henderson	5 episodes
1970	Bewitched	Ernest Hitchcock	Episode: "Salem, Here We Come"
1970	It Takes a Thief	Mike	Episode: "Beyond a Treasonable Doubt"
1971	The Grand Opening of Walt Disney World	Himself	Television movie documentary
1971	The Jimmy Stewart Show	Harris Crofton	2 episodes
1971	Love, American Style	Young Unmarrieds	1 episode
1971	Nanny and the Professor	Schiavoni	Episode: "The Man Who Came to Pasta"
1971	Mooch Goes to Hollywood	Himself	Television movie
1971	The Merv Griffin Show	Himself	1 episode
1971–72	Alias Smith and Jones	Armendariz	3 episodes
1972	The Mod Squad	Frank Barton	Episode: "The Connection"
1972	The Jimmy Stewart Show	Admiral Decker	2 episodes
1973	Chase	Parker	Episode: "A Bit of Class"
1974	Ironside	Tony Hudson	Episode: "The Last Cotillion"
1974	Banacek	Marius Avantalu	Episode: "The Vanishing Chalice"
1974	Dinah!	Himself	1 episode
1975	Medical Center	Packy	Episode: "The High Cost of Winning"
1976	Ellery Queen	Armand Danello	Episode: "The Adventure of the Wary Witness"
1977	Chico and the Man	Gilberto Rodriguez	Episode: "Chco's Padre"
1978	Vega$	Christopher Vincente	Episode: "Lost Women"
1979	Buck Rogers in the 25th Century	Amos Armat	Episode: "Vegas in Space"
1979–83	Fantasy Island	Various	4 episodes
1980	Charlie's Angels	Elton Mills	Episode: "Dancing' Angels"
1982	Matt Houston	Miles Gantry	Episode: "Who Would Kill Ramona?"
1983	Hart to Hart	Dr. Villac	Episode: "Chamber of Lost Harts"
1984–86	The Love Boat	Various	4 episodes
1985	Magnum, P.I.	Doc Villoroch	Episode: "Little Games"
1985	Family Feud	Himself	1 episode
1985–88	Falcon Crest	Peter Stavros	52 episodes
1985–86	Riptide	Angelo Guirilini	2 episodes
1985–92	Murder, She Wrote	Marcello Abruzzi; Diego Santana	2 episodes
1988	The Tracey Ullman Show	Roland Diego	1 episode
1990	The Golden Girls	Tony	Episode: "Girls Just Wanna Have Fun... Before They Die"
1993	Edna Time!	Himself	Episode: "Pilot"

== Theatre ==
Year	Title	Role	Notes
1927	Lady Do	Dancer	Musical
1929–1930	The Street Singer	John	Broadway
1929–1931	Stella Brady		Broadway
1930	Strictly Dishonorable	Count Di Ruvo	Broadway
1932	All Points West		Broadway
1932–1933	Dinner at Eight	Ricci	Broadway
1933	Ten Minute Alibi		Broadway
1933	Spring in Autumn		Broadway
1973	Mr. Barry's Etchings	Sam Jordan	

== Radio appearances ==
Year	Program	Episode/source
1949	Burns and Allen Show	"Cesar Romero Steals Bill’s Girlfriend"
1952	Hollywood Star Playhouse	Diamonds of Gulaga

== Sources ==
- Bernstein, Samuel Garza. 2025. Caesar Romero: The Joker is Wild. University Press of Kentucky, Lexington, KY. ISBN 978-1-9859-0288-6
