= Google Doodle =

Change to Google's logo on anniversaries and special days

The first Google Doodle, on August 30, 1998, which celebrated Burning Man

A Google Doodle is a special, temporary alteration of the logo on Google's homepages intended to commemorate holidays, events, achievements, and historical figures. The first Google Doodle honored the 1998 edition of the long-running annual Burning Man event in Black Rock City, Nevada, and was designed by co-founders Larry Page and Sergey Brin to notify users of their absence in case the servers crashed. Early marketing employee Susan Wojcicki then spearheaded subsequent Doodles, including an alien landing on Google and additional custom logos for major holidays. Since then, a team of employees called Doodlers have organized and published the Doodles.

Initially, Doodles were neither animated nor hyperlinked—they were simply images with tooltips describing the subject or expressing a holiday greeting. Doodles increased in both frequency and complexity by the beginning of the 2010s. On October 31, 2000, the first animated Doodle celebrated Halloween. On May 21, 2010, the first interactive Doodle appeared later celebrating Pac-Man, and hyperlinks also began to be added to Doodles, usually linking to a search results page for the subject of the Doodle. By 2014, Google had published over 2,000 regional and international Doodles throughout its homepages, often featuring guest artists, musicians, and personalities. By 2024, the Doodlers team had created over 5,000 Doodles for Google's homepages around the world.

== Overview ==
In addition to celebrating many well-known events and holidays, Google Doodles celebrate artists and scientists on their birthdays. The featuring of Lowell's logo design coincided with the launch of another Google product, Google Maps. Doodles are also used to depict major events at Google, such as the company's own anniversary. The celebration of historic events is another common topic of Google Doodles including a Lego brick design in celebration of the interlocking Lego block's 50th anniversary. Some Google Doodles are limited to Google's country-specific home pages while others appear globally.

=== Common themes ===
Since the first Thanksgiving Doodle in 1998, many Doodles for holidays, events and other celebrations have recurred annually. These include:

- Gregorian New Year's Day (2000–present)
- Martin Luther King Jr. Day (2003; 2006–present)
- Lunar New Year (2001; 2003–present)
- Valentine's Day (2000–present; partial exception during certain Olympic years)
- International Women's Day (2005; 2009–present)
- Saint Patrick's Day (2000–2002; 2004–2021; 2023–present)
- Easter (2000; 2026–present)
- Earth Day (2001–present)
- Mother's Day (2000–present)
- Memorial Day (2026–present)
- Father's Day (2000–present)
- Juneteenth (2020–present)
- Canada Day (2001–2002; 2004–2007; 2009–2010; 2012–present)
- U.S. Independence Day (2000–present)
- Bastille Day (2000–present)
- German Unity Day (2002–2003; 2006–2008; 2010–present)
- Swiss National Day (2001–present)
- Olympic Games (2000–present; partial exception in 2014)
- FIFA World Cup (2002–present)
- Halloween (1999–present)
- Veterans Day (2007–present)
- Hinamatsuri (2009–2012; 2014–2023)
- U.S. Thanksgiving Day (1998–present)
- Christmas Day (1999–present) (Note: Every year since 1999, Google has posted a special international doodle as either one logo or several interconnected logos, spanning at least the day of December 25 (sometimes beginning as early as December 1 and ending as late as December 27). Many of the logos have had winter themes, despite it being summer in the Southern Hemisphere, but few have had explicitly Christmas themes, opting for generic seasonally festive imagery instead. Google has rarely if ever used the word "Christmas" in relation to these Doodles, though multiple news sources have. Google has used terminology including "season's greetings", "happy holidays", "'tis the season", "end of year" and "holiday series" to describe the Doodles. In certain years the Doodle would be redisplayed on January 6 and/or 7, the date of Christmas in some regions and denominations.)
- New Year's Eve (1999; 2011–present)

== Doodlers ==
Doodlers is Google's name for the illustrators, engineers and artists who design the Doodles. They have included artists such as Ekua Holmes, Sophia Foster-Dimino, Lynnette Haozous, and Eric Carle.

== Notable doodles ==
Google's interactive game maze logo, a playable version of Pac-Man

In May 2010, on the 30th anniversary of the 1980 arcade game Pac-Man, Google unveiled worldwide their first interactive logo, a playable Pac-Man Google Doodle, created in association with Namco. Anyone who visited Google could play Pac-Man on the logo, which featured the letters of the word Google on the Pac-Man maze. The logo also mimicked the sounds the original arcade game made. The I'm Feeling Lucky button was replaced with an Insert Coin button. Pressing this once enabled the user to play the Pac-Man logo. Pressing it again added a second player, Ms. Pac-Man, enabling two players to play at once, controlled using the W, A, S, D keys, instead of the arrows as used by Player 1. Pressing it for a third time performed an I'm Feeling Lucky search. It was then removed on May 23, 2010, initially replacing Pac-Man with the normal logo. Later on that day, Google released a permanent site to play Google Pac-Man (accessed by clicking on top icon), due to the popular user demand for the playable logo. Pac-Man Doodle drew an estimated 1 billion players worldwide.

Since that time, Google has continued to post occasional interactive and video doodles:

=== The 2010s ===
- On June 8, 2010, composer Robert Schumann was celebrated with a Google Doodle for his 200th birthday.
- On September 4, 2010, the Google logo was changed to an interactive Buckyball to celebrate the 25th anniversary of its discovery. The Buckyball, also known as Buckminsterfullerene C_{60}, is a molecule made entirely of carbon and shaped like a geodesic dome.
- On September 6, 2010, Google launched its fourth interactive Google Doodle. Google Instant – Particle Logo replaced its static logo with a JavaScript-based particle movement simulator where dynamic colored balls can be manipulated with the movement of the mouse cursor over the logo, or by shaking of the browser window. Unlike some other Google Doodles, this one is unclickable.
- On September 7, 2010, another Google Instant family logo known as Keystroke Logo was released. A grayed-out colorless logo lit up with the standard Google colors as the first six letters of a search query were entered.
- On October 8, 2010, Google ran its first video doodle, a short animation set to the music of "Imagine" to mark what would have been John Lennon's 70th birthday. Similarly, Freddie Mercury's would-be 65th birthday was celebrated on September 5, 2011, with an animated clip set to "Don't Stop Me Now".
- On April 15, 2011, Google sported the first live-action video doodle, in commemoration of Charlie Chaplin's 122nd birthday. This doodle was a black and white YouTube video that, when clicked upon, started playing before redirecting to the usual Google search featuring the doodle's special occasion. All parts in this short film were played by the Google Doodle team, and special behind-the-scenes footage was to be found on the Google blog.
- Google displayed an interactive electric guitar doodle starting June 9, 2011, to commemorate the 96th birthday of Les Paul (d. 2009). Apart from being able to hover the cursor over the doodle to strum the strings just like one of Les Paul's Gibson guitars, there was also a keyboard button, which when enabled allowed interaction with the doodle via the keyboard. The doodle still maintained some resemblance to the Google logo. In the U.S., the doodle also allowed the user to record a 30-second clip, after which a URL is created and can be sent to others. The doodle remained on the site an extra day due to popularity in the U.S. It now has its own page linked to the Google Doodles archives.
- On January 18, 2012, for users in the United States, Google placed a censor bar on top of their logo to protest SOPA and PIPA.
- On May 23, 2012, for what would have been instrument inventor and synthesizer pioneer Robert Moog's 78th birthday, the Doodle team pulled off their own feat of engineering: a fully playable and recordable Google logo resembling a vintage Minimoog Model D synthesizer. Electronic analog Moog Synthesizer timbre and tones would come to define a generation of music, featuring heavily in songs by The Beatles, The Doors, Stevie Wonder, Kraftwerk and many others. Much like the musical machines Bob Moog created, this doodle was synthesized from a number of smaller components to form a unique instrument. Mouse or computer keyboard was used to control the mini-synthesizer's keys and knobs and fiddle with oscillators and envelopes. Synthesizer doodle patched the keyboard into a 4-track tape recorder that could share songs.
- On April 9, 2012, motion picture pioneer Eadweard Muybridge was celebrated in a Google doodle.
- On June 21, 2012, Google celebrated what would have been Soviet singer-songwriter Viktor Tsoi's 50th birthday with a Google Doodle that shared resemblance with the Tsoi Wall.
- On June 23, 2012, in commemoration of Alan Turing's 100th birthday, Google's logo became an interactive Turing Machine.
- On August 8, 2012, Google displayed an interactive Basketball game for the 2012 Summer Olympics.
- On September 8, 2012, Google celebrated the 46th anniversary of Star Trek with this beautiful interactive multi-scene doodle.
- On September 13, 2012, Google created a doodle for Clara Schumann to commemorate her 193rd birthday.
- On December 10, 2012, Google celebrated computing pioneer Ada Lovelace.
- On January 2, 2013, Maurice Sendak was celebrated in a Google doodle inspired by his Where the Wild Things Are and In the Night Kitchen.
- On November 23, 2013, Google's logo changed to a playable Doctor Who game in honor of the show's 50th anniversary.
- On May 19, 2014, for the 40th anniversary of the Rubik's Cube, Google made an interactive virtual Rubik's Cube that people could try to solve.
- On April 14, 2015, for the 155th anniversary of the Pony Express, Google made a playable 2D side-scrolling doodle game in which the player collects mail, avoids obstacles, and delivers up to 100 letters from California to Missouri.
- On October 1, 2015, Annie Besant's 168th birthday was commemorated with a Doodle.
- On October 30, 2015, to celebrate Halloween, Google made an online interactive doodle game called the "Global Candy Cup." It features 4 witches all named and colored after the colors in Google's logo competing in a flying competition. To play, users had tom click the play button and click or tap on the screen to move the witch up and down and collect candy. At the end of their play-through, all the candy the user collected was added to their witch's global score. At the end of Halloween it was revealed that Yellow won the cup, possibly due to her affinity for cats.
- On December 17, 2015, a Google Doodle was featured honoring the 245th anniversary of Beethoven's date of birth. It features an interactive game to match the musical writing in correct order as it featured 4 levels.
- On January 22, 2016, for the 151st birthday of Wilbur Scoville, creator of the Scoville Scale, Google made a playable doodle game in which the player plays as an ice cream cone throwing ice cream scoops at a variety of peppers to neutralize their heat. Gameplay is based on the timing of a mouse click or space bar press which rapidly increases in difficulty. The game includes 5 levels, each featuring a different type of pepper (Bell Pepper, Jalapeño Pepper, Cayenne Pepper, Ghost Pepper, and Trinidad Moruga scorpion) and a fun fact about the peppers along with their measured Scoville Heat Units.
- On April 21, 2016, the Google logo was re-colored purple, with the addition of a raindrop animation, following the death of American singer-songwriter Prince; this Google Doodle is a reference to his hit song "Purple Rain" from the titular film he starred in.
- On August 5, 2016, for the 2016 Summer Olympics, the Google app received an update for Android and iOS devices to include 7 mini games called Doodle Fruit Games featuring Strawberry, Blueberry, Coconut, Pineapple, and more. It lasted until August 21, with a new mini game every day. The game was accessible on the Google app by clicking on a play button.
- On October 30, 2016, for Halloween, Google added a game series called Magic Cat Academy, featuring a cat named Momo fighting ghosts. To play, users had to click on a play button, and "draw" to kill the ghosts.
- On February 11, 12, 13 and 14, 2017, for Valentine's Day, Google added a game featuring the endangered pangolin, an African and Asian mammal, that goes through four levels (one released each day), while collecting objects, and avoiding obstacles.
- On 28 February 2017, Google celebrated humanitarian Edhi with a Google Doodle hailing his "super-efficient" ambulance service.
- On May 9, 2017, a Google Doodle was featured honoring the 181st birthday of Ferdinand Monoyer. He was a French ophthalmologist who in 1872 introduced the dioptre, the reciprocal of focal length in metres, as a unit for lens power. Its use greatly simplifies calculations when combining lenses. He devised an eye chart where every row represents a different lens power, from smallest to largest. A close look at the Doodle may reveal to the reader a tribute to Monoyer: his name, hidden in the chart.
- On June 22, 2017, to commemorate the 117th birthday of animator Oskar Fischinger, Google released an interactive fullscreen Doodle that let users create their own animations by tapping on the screen. The user could then choose to share it to social media. The game was accessible by tapping on 2 play buttons.
- On August 11, 2017, the 44th anniversary of DJ Kool Herc's pioneering use of the hip hop break, the Google Doodle allowed users to use a double turntable to act as a hip-hop DJ.
- On September 4, 2017, to commemorate the 83rd birthday of Russian baritone singer Eduard Khil, Google added a video doodle that featured an animated Eduard Khil singing "I am very glad, as I'm finally returning back home", known globally as the "Trololo" song.
- On December 4, 2017, Google celebrated 50 years of kids' coding languages with an Interactive Doodle.
- On December 8, 2017, Google commemorated the 287th birthday of biologist Jan Ingenhousz with a Doodle.
- On January 29, 2018, Google celebrated Taiwanese singer Teresa Teng on what would have been her 65th birthday.
- On May 3, 2018, Google celebrated the work of Georges Méliès by making a doodle that encompassed his famous work like A Trip to the Moon and The Impossible Voyage. The doodle is also the first google doodle that was shown in 360-degrees format, with the viewer being able to rotate the video to give them different points of view.
- On May 16, 2018, Google celebrated Polish painter Tamara de Lempicka.
- On June 10, 2018, Google celebrated the history of garden gnomes by releasing an interactive Doodle where the player can use a catapult to launch their clay gnomes into the furthest reach of their garden.
- On September 15, 2018, for India, Google commemorated Sir Mokshagundam Visvesvaraya's 158th Birthday, on which day India celebrates Engineer's Day.
- On September 21, 2018, a stop-motion video Google doodle celebrating Fred Rogers was created in collaboration with Fred Rogers productions, The Fred Rogers center, and BixPix entertainment.
- On October 30, 2018, for Halloween, Google added a multiplayer game called Great Ghoul Duel, featuring two teams of ghosts racing to collect spirits and steal them from the other team. Games can support up to 8 players, and users could create custom invite links or match with random users across the globe. Great Ghoul Duel was the first Doodle to support multiplayer over the internet.
- On November 6, 2018, for the United States elections, Google changed their logo to Go Vote.
- On November 11, 2018, Google celebrated the 58th posthumous birthday of Christy Essien-Igbokwe, who was a Nigerian musician and actress.
- On December 5, 2018, during the state funeral of George H. W. Bush following his death, Google changed its logo to grayscale, making it appear colorless.
- On March 7, 2019, Google celebrated Olga Ladyzhenskaya, a Russian mathematician.
- On March 21, 2019, Google celebrated German composer and musician Johann Sebastian Bach by creating the first Doodle that uses artificial intelligence to make music. When a button is pressed, the Doodle uses machine learning to harmonize a user-created melody into Bach's signature music style (or alternatively into a Bach 80s rock style hybrid if an amp on the right side is clicked).
- On May 27, 2019, Google commemorated Memorial Day with a colorless Google logo, which was previously used for the death of George H. W. Bush the previous year, alongside a hyperlink containing a small U.S. flag. Google would continue to use this logo design for every Memorial Day holiday from that point forward up until May 26, 2025.
- On July 16–20, 2019, Google celebrated the 50th anniversary of the Apollo 11 Moon landing by NASA where Neil Armstrong became the first man on the Moon.
- On August 12, 2019, for India, Google commemorated Vikram Sarabhai's 100th birthday. He is internationally regarded as the Father of the Indian Space Program.
- On December 9–10, 2019, the interactive Google doodle game celebrated the Mexican card game Lotería.

=== The 2020s ===
- On March 20, 2020, near the beginning of the COVID-19 pandemic, Google honored Ignaz Semmelweis for pioneering the practice of hand washing. The Doodle animation specifically showcased how to properly and thoroughly wash one's hands.
  - Google also released several doodles in the following weeks thanking various industry workers who assisted people during the pandemic.
  - Some games were re-released for people staying at home during lockdown to play.
- On April 22, 2020, in celebration of the 50th anniversary of Earth Day, a Doodle game was created in partnership with the Honeybee Conservancy, wherein a honeybee is guided by the player to pollinate flowers, while facts about the honeybee and its impact are shared between levels.
- On May 20, 2020, Google celebrated the 61st birthday of Israel Kamakawiwo'ole, who is best known for his rendition of "Somewhere Over The Rainbow".
- On May 21–22, 2020, the interactive Doodle celebrated the mbira as Zimbabwe's culture week begins.
- On June 30, 2020, Google celebrated Marsha P. Johnson with a Google Doodle.
- On September 1, 2020, Google honored Jackie Ormes, known for being the first African-American woman cartoonist, along with being the creator of the Torchy Brown comic strip and the Patty-Jo 'n' Ginger panel. The Doodle animation showcased a slideshow of her career.
- On October 30, 2020, a second installment to the Magic Cat Academy was made for Halloween. It had a similar gameplay, but a different setting (underwater) and focused on sea creatures such as the immortal jellyfish and the anglerfish.
- On November 26, 2020, Google celebrated British firefighter Frank Bailey (firefighter) on what would have been his 95th birthday.
- On December 10, 2020, Google celebrated St Lucian economist, professor, and author W. Arthur Lewis.
- On December 20, 2020, Google remembered the last surviving male Northern white rhinoceros, Sudan.
- On December 30, 2020, Google celebrated Alaska native civil rights champion Elizabeth Peratrovich, who played an instrumental role in the 1945 passage of the first anti-discrimination law in the United States.
- On January 15, 2021, Google honored James Naismith, the inventor of basketball. The Doodle animation showcases a person making a basket.
- On March 10, 2021, Google honored Wu Lien-teh, depicting Wu Lien-teh assembling surgical masks and distributing them to reduce the risk of disease transmission.
- On April 20, 2021, Google celebrated Luther Vandross on his 70th birthday with an animated Google Doodle that plays Vandross's song "Never Too Much".
- On June 9, 2021, Google honored Shirley Temple with an animated depiction of her during her career as a child actress alongside her later service as a diplomat.
- On July 23, 2021, Google released an RPG-style game called Doodle Champion Island Games, with artwork by Studio 4°C, to celebrate video gaming, Japanese folklore, and the 2020 Olympics in Tokyo.
- On August 14, 2021, Google made a doodle of Derawar Fort to celebrate Pakistan's 75 Independence Day. According to Google, the fort symbolizes Pakistani adaptability and antiquity.
- On September 2, 2021, Google made a doodle celebrating the 138th birthday of the Polish biologist Rudolf Weigl, known for developing the epidemic typhus vaccine.
- On September 5, 2021, Olivia When made a doodle celebrating the 107th birthday of the Chilean poet Nicanor Parra, being visible in 15 countries, including Chile.
- On September 6, 2021, Google made a doodle celebrating the 100th birthday of the Spanish writer Carmen Laforet, in which she appears reading a book on a balcony.
- On September 8, 2021, Google made an 80-second illustrated video celebrating the 32nd birthday of Swedish DJ Tim Bergling, in which many people are enjoying his song "Wake Me Up".
- On September 15, 2021, Google made five doodles celebrating independence day in various Central American countries such as Guatemala, Honduras, El Salvador, Nicaragua and Costa Rica. Panama was not included, because its independence date was not September 15.
- On September 16, 2021, Magdiel Herrera made a doodle known as à la Mexicana celebrating Mexican independence day. It shows a china poblana, a pozole, a bell, a hat with a zarape, a cactus and an Aztec musician.
- On September 17, 2021, Google did a doodle celebrating the birth of Michiyo Tsujimura, a Japanese biochemist known for her research on green tea and its nutritional benefits.
- On September 18, 2021, Google made a doodle from the Chilean National Holidays shows in the center to a huemul, an animal representative of both the country and the national shield.
- On September 25, 2021, Google celebrated American actor and activist Christopher Reeve.
- On October 1, 2021, Roxie Vizcarra created a slideshow doodle celebrating US Chicano educator, boxer, poet, and activist Rodolfo Gonzales.
- On November 1, 2021, Google celebrated Zuni native American fiber artist, weaver, and potter the late We'wha with an interactive doodle.
- On November 4, 2021, Google celebrated Chinese-born, British American physicist and educator Charles K. Kao.
- On November 8, 2021, Google celebrated Indian cell biologist Kamal Ranadive on her 104th birthday.
- On November 12, 2021, Google celebrated Dutch painter Johannes Vermeer, who painted the Girl with a Pearl Earring in 1665.
- On November 14, 2021, Google celebrated the 216th birthday of German pianist and composer Fanny Hensel.
- On November 20, 2021, Google celebrated Creole classical musician and composer Edmond Dede.
- On December 2, 2021, pioneering pointillist painter Georges Seurat was celebrated in a Google doodle.
- On December 17, 2021, Google celebrated the 315th birthday of French mathematician, translator and physicist Émilie du Châtelet.
- In January 2022, Google created a special Doodle that appears when one searches for the term Wordle, based on the online game which had risen to popularity the previous month. The Doodle mimics playing the game Wordle on the name Google.
- On January 8, 2022, Google celebrated English cosmologist, author, and physicist Stephen Hawking.
- On January 17, 2022, Google celebrated what would have been Betty White's 100th birthday (she died just weeks earlier on December 31, 2021) by having rose petals fall from the top of the screen and the phrase thank you for being a friend appear at the bottom when the user searches for her name, both references to her popular television role on The Golden Girls.
- On January 26, 2022, Google celebrated the 124th birthday of Russian born, Polish avant-garde sculptor and art theoretician Katarzyna Kobro.
- On February 9, 2022, Google celebrated athlete Toni Stone in honor of Black History Month.
- On February 17, 2022, Google celebrated Dr. Michiaki Takahashi's 94th birthday with a doodle showing first the research phase, then a boy with chickenpox, a doctor giving the chickenpox vaccine, and ending with bottles of medicine and dots giving a graphical representation of the declining number of cases due to the vaccine.
- On March 16, 2022, Google celebrated the 200th birthday of French painter Rosa Bonheur.
- On April 12, 2022, Google celebrated Montserrat Caballe's 89th birthday.
- On April 29, 2022, Google hit all the right notes by celebrating Toots Thielemans on what would be his 100th birthday.
- On April 30, 2022, Google took you to U.S. Route 66 with a video doodle.
- On May 2, 2022, Google celebrated the birthday of the black Canadian American engineer and inventor Elijah McCoy.
- On May 19, 2022, Google celebrated Stacey Milbern and her legacy with a doodle in honor of Asian Pacific American heritage month on what would have been her 35th birthday.
- On May 22, 2022, Google celebrated The Great Gama in honor of his 144th birthday.
- On June 4, 2022, Google celebrated the inspiring life of Kiyoshi Kuromiya and the legacy of activism he left behind.
- On June 6, 2022, Google celebrated Angelo Moriondo, the man who invented the espresso machine.
- On June 17, 2022, Google celebrated British composer, teacher, and opera singer Amanda Aldridge.
- On June 25, 2022, Google honored German diarist Anne Frank with a slideshow doodle.
- On July 6, 2022, Google celebrated the 71st birthday of Native American stand-up comedian Charlie Hill.
- On July 18, 2022, Google celebrated what would have been the 112th birthday of electronic music producer and physicist Oskar Sala.
- On July 26, 2022, Google celebrated the steelpan with a video doodle.
- On July 31 – August 1, 2022, the interactive Google doodle game celebrated petanque, a beloved French outdoor game played around the world.
- On August 23, 2022, Google celebrated the 104th birthday of physicist and meteorologist Anna Mani.
- On September 8, 2022, the date of Queen Elizabeth II's death, Google established a specialized grayscale Doodle in the United Kingdom and certain other Commonwealth nations, which is simply a colorless Google logo and a hyperlink to Queen Elizabeth II in honor of the late monarch. A dedicated page was established for the Doodle on Google's Doodle archive site, but it was not displayed in the normal listing.
  - For the date of Queen Elizabeth II's funeral on September 19, Google changed the aforementioned grayscale Doodle to black. This Doodle, as with the grayscale one established on her date of death, was also not displayed in the normal archive listing on Google's Doodle archive site.
- On October 11, 2022, Google celebrated the musician and entertainer Tito Puente.
- On October 30–31, 2022, Google re-released the Great Ghoul Duel multiplayer Doodle from 2018 with additional maps and achievements. The game was originally scheduled to be released 2021, but it was delayed due to server and designing difficulties.
- On November 1, 2022, Google celebrated Indigenous North American stickball in honor of Native American heritage month.
- On November 4, 2022, Google celebrated the West African dish jollof rice.
- On November 21, 2022, Google celebrated the life of Marie Tharp with an interactive doodle.
- On November 23, 2022, Google celebrated Mexican American actress Myrtle Gonzalez.
- On December 1–2, 2022, the interactive Google doodle game celebrated the 82nd birthday of Jerry Lawson, one of the fathers of modern gaming.
- On December 12, 2022, Google celebrated the life and innovative work of Maria Telkes, one of the first pioneers of solar energy.
- On December 17, 2022, Google celebrated Ana Mercedes Hoyos, a distinguished Colombian artist.
- On December 19, 2022, Google celebrated 17th century painter Judith Leyster's work.
- On January 29–30, 2023, the interactive Google Doodle game celebrated bubble tea, also known as boba tea and pearl milk tea.
- On February 8, 2023, Google celebrated Haitian American model and disability rights advocate Mama Cax.
- On March 15, 2023, Google celebrated adobo, a way of cooking and a favorite Filipino dish.
- On March 19, 2023, Google celebrated the 80th birthday of Mexican chemist Mario Molina.
- On March 22, 2023, Google celebrated French mime artist Marcel Marceau.
- On March 24, 2023, Google celebrated the 77th birthday of Kitty O'Neil, once crowned the fastest woman in the world.
- On March 28, 2023, Google celebrated Justine Siegemund, a midwife who dared to challenge patriarchal attitudes in the 17th century.
- On April 30, 2023, to commemorate 36 years since his first leading role in theatre, Google celebrated the life of British actor Alan Rickman.
- On May 5, 2023, Google celebrated the life and work of Chinese American photographer, journalist, and activist Corky Lee.
- On May 7, 2023, Google celebrated the 190th birthday of German composer and pianist Johannes Brahms.
- On May 20–21, 2023, the interactive Google doodle celebrated Lake Xochimilco, a natural lake near Mexico City, Mexico.
- On May 22, 2023, Google celebrated Barbara May Cameron, a photographer, poet, writer, and activist.
- On June 9, 2023, the Google doodle video celebrated Willi Ninja, an iconic dancer and choreographer known as the Godfather of Voguing.
- On June 10, 2023, Google celebrated scones, an afternoon tea treat in the United Kingdom.
- On June 20, 2023, Google celebrated the Polish sculptor and artist Magdalena Abakanowicz.
- On July 12–13, 2023, the interactive Google doodle game celebrated the Indian street food Panipuri, also widely known as golgappa.
- On July 16, 2023, Google celebrated Indian American artist and printmaker Zarina Hashmi.
- On July 17, 2023, Google celebrated the 204th birthday of American scientist and women's rights activist Eunice Newton Foote with a slideshow doodle.
- On August 4, 2023, Google celebrated the life of Altina Schinasi, an American artist, designer, and inventor.
- On September 15, 2023, Google celebrated Guatemalan American labor organizer, journalist, and activist Luisa Moreno.
- On September 27, 2023, Google celebrated its 25th anniversary by showcasing a doodle chronicling the evolution of the Google logo from 1997 to the present, which ends with the current logo having the two "o"s change into the numbers 25 in reference to Google's 25th anniversary; the logo in question is stylized as G25gle.
- On September 29, 2023, Google celebrated the 89th birthday of psychologist Mihaly Csikszentmihalyi.
- On September 30, 2023, Google celebrated deaf French educator and intellectual Ferdinand Berthier.
- On October 2, 2023, Google celebrated the Appalachian Trail with a slideshow doodle.
- On October 17, 2023, Google celebrated the 118th birthday of Mexican American media pioneer, broadcaster, and community activist Raoul A. Cortez.
- On October 20, 2023, Google celebrated the 122nd birthday of jazz singer Adelaide Hall in honor of UK black history month.
- On October 31, 2023, Google celebrated Halloween by showcasing a Halloween slideshow poem.
- On November 3, 2023, Google celebrated Chiricahua Apache sculptor, painter, and book illustrator Allan Houser.
- On November 21, 2023, Google celebrated Chinese Australian surgeon Victor Chang.
- On March 7, 2024, Google celebrated what would have been Mexican singer Lola Beltrán's 92nd birthday in an animated doodle.
- On March 11, 2024, Google celebrated the flat white, a beloved coffee drink of steamed milk poured over a shot of espresso.
- On April 8, 2024, Google celebrated the Solar eclipse of April 8, 2024.
- On April 15, 2024, Google celebrated the life and legacy of Lebanese American writer Etel Adnan.
- On April 20, 2024, Google celebrated the start of the 2024 NBA playoffs.
- On May 1, 2024, Google celebrated Indian American poet Meena Alexander.
- On May 14, 2024, Google celebrated the start of the 28th WNBA season.
- On May 16, 2024, Google celebrated the 81st birthday of activist Hank Adams.
- On May 23, 2024, Google celebrated chilaquiles, the beloved Mexican dish that has made its way into homes around the world.
- On June 6, 2024, Google celebrated Chicana activist, feminist, and author Jeanne Cordova in honor of pride month.
- On June 10, 2024, Google celebrated the Dragon Boat Festival.
- On June 20, 2024, Google kicked off the Conmebol Copa America 2024 as the 48th installment of the Copa América Series.
- On August 19, 2024, Google celebrated Welsh poet and deaf activist Dorothy Miles.
- On September 9, 2024, Google celebrated S'more with a slideshow doodle.
- On September 19, 2024, Google celebrated Cuban American silent film actor and activist Emerson Romero in honor of Hispanic heritage month. The doodle was canceled on September 15, 2024.
- On September 25–26, 2024, the interactive Google Doodle game celebrated popcorn.
- On October 19, 2024, Google celebrated the staurikosaurus, one of the oldest dinosaurs ever discovered
- On October 24, 2024, the interactive Google Doodle game celebrated October's final half moon phase.
- On October 30–31, 2024, a third installment to the Magic Cat Academy was made for Halloween. It also had similar gameplay, but a different setting (space) and focused across the layers of the atmosphere.
- On November 15, 2024, Google celebrated the kayak in honor of Native American heritage month.
- On November 21, 2024, the interactive Google Doodle game celebrated November's final half moon phase.
- On November 28, 2024, Google celebrated the American holiday of Thanksgiving.
- On December 16, 2024, Google celebrated the Independence Day of Kazakhstan.
- On December 22, 2024, the interactive Google Doodle game celebrated December's final half moon phase.
- On January 9, 2025, during the state funeral of Jimmy Carter following his death, Google once again changed its logo to use a colorless variant of the logo.
- On January 23, 2025, the interactive Google Doodle game celebrated January's final half moon phase.
- On February 1, 2025, Google celebrated house music in honor of Black History Month.
- On February 6, 2025, Google celebrated gumbo, a dish that might blur the lines between soup and stews, but has become a staple in Louisiana's cuisine.
- On June 1, 2025, Google celebrated hyperpop in honor of pride month.
- On September 15, 2025, Google celebrated salsa music in honor of Hispanic heritage month.
- On September 27, 2025, Google celebrated its 27th anniversary by temporarily changing the Google logo to the 1998 version.
- On October 30–31, 2025, the night before Halloween, a doodle featuring the Pac-Man game was revealed, but this time with Halloween motifs.
- On November 1, 2025, a Google doodle was made celebrating Native American flutes during Native American heritage month.
- On April 27, 2026, a Google doodle was made commemorating Freedom Day in South Africa.
- On May 8, 2026, Google celebrated the 100th birthday of David Attenborough, which displayed a “Thank You” note, with cartoon animals wearing party hats and holding cupcakes and small gifts when searched.
- On May 25, 2026, Google celebrated Memorial Day with a doodle featuring a grayscale "colorless" version of the logo with a blue starry embroidered folded flag replacing the two "o"s. This was the first proper Google doodle for Memorial Day, replacing the all gray "colorless" logo that was previously used for Memorial Day since May 24, 2019 (which was first used on December 5, 2018 for the death of George H. W. Bush).
- On September 27, 2026, Google celebrated its 28th anniversary by temporarily changing the Google logo to the one used in its early years (c. 1997).

== Doodle 4 Google" competitions ==
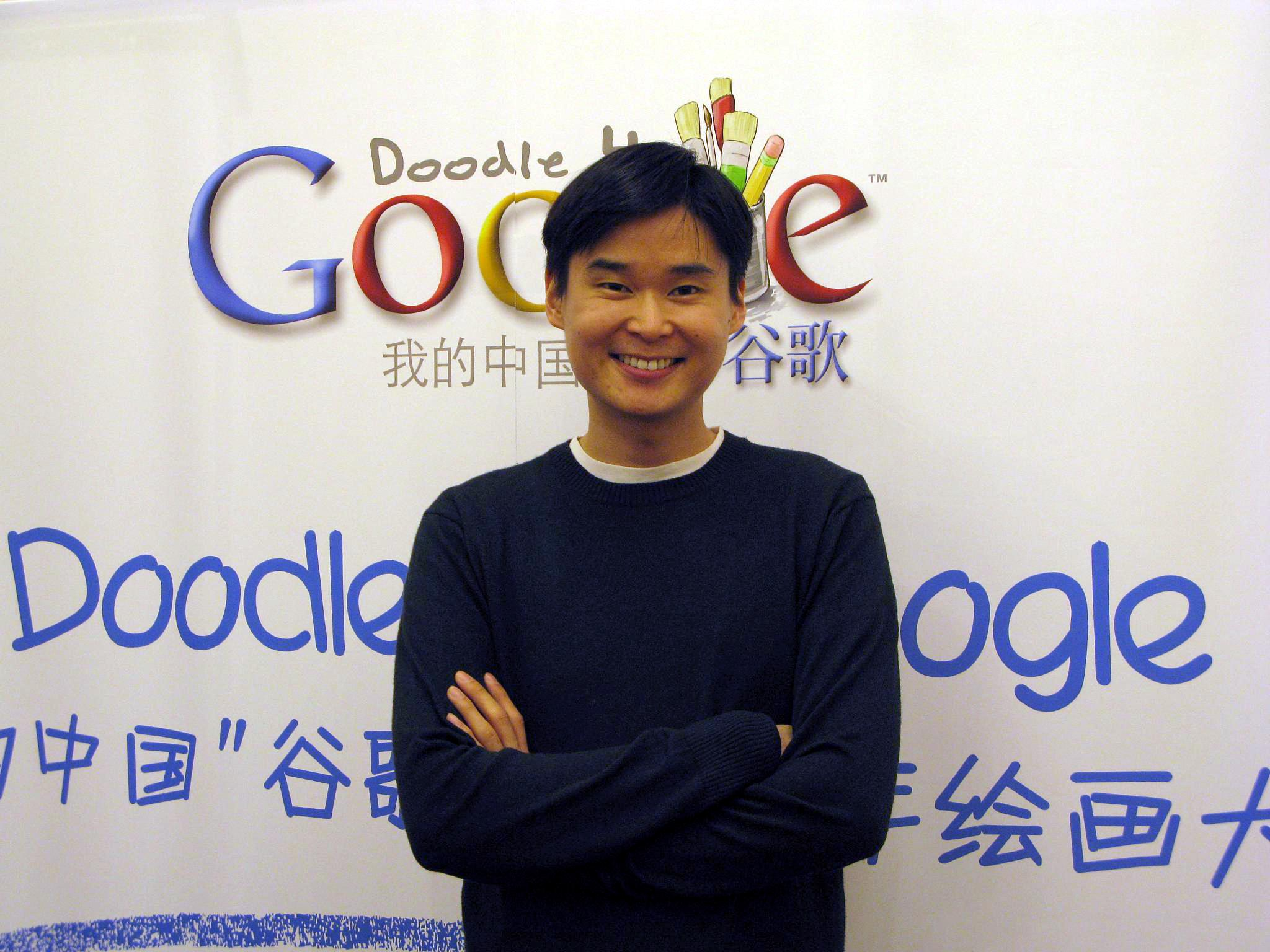
The original Google Doodler, Dennis Hwang, at a Doodle 4 Google event in Beijing, 2009

Google holds competitions for school students to create their own Google doodles, referred to as Doodle 4 Google. Winning doodles go onto the Doodle4Google website, where the public can vote for the winner, who wins a trip to the Googleplex and the hosting of the winning doodle for 24 hours on the Google website.

The competition originated in the United Kingdom, and has since expanded to the United States and other countries. The competition was also held in Ireland in 2008. Google announced a Doodle 4 Google competition for India in 2009 and the winning doodle was displayed on the Google India homepage on November 14. A similar competition held in Singapore based on the theme "Our Singapore" was launched in January 2010 and the winning entry was chosen from over 30,000 entries received. The winning design was shown on Singapore's National Day on Google Singapore's homepage. It was held again in 2015 in Singapore and was themed "Singapore: The next 50 years".

== Controversy and criticism ==
On September 13, 2007, Google posted a doodle honoring author Roald Dahl on the anniversary of his birth, but this date coincided with the first day of the Jewish holiday of Rosh Hashanah, and Google was immediately criticized by members of the Jewish community for this decision, mainly because Dahl has been accused of anti-Semitism. Google removed the Doodle by 2:00 p.m. that day, and there remains no evidence of its existence in Google's official Doodle archive to this date.

In 2007, Google was also criticized for not featuring Doodles for American patriotic holidays, such as Memorial Day and Veterans Day. In that year, Google featured a logo commemorating Veterans Day.

In 2014, Google received some criticism for not honoring the 70th anniversary of the D-Day invasion with a Doodle and instead honoring Japanese Go player Honinbo Shusaku. In response to the criticism, Google removed that logo from their homepage and added a series of links to images of the invasion of Normandy.

On May 19, 2016, Google honored Yuri Kochiyama, an Asian-American activist and member of the Maoist-based black nationalist group Revolutionary Action Movement, with a Doodle on its main American homepage. This choice was criticized by conservative commentators due to some of Kochiyama's controversial opinions, such as admiration for Osama bin Laden and Mao Zedong. U.S. Senator Pat Toomey called for a public apology from Google. However, Google did not respond to any criticism, nor did it alter the presentation of the Doodle on its homepage or on the Doodle's dedicated page.

=== Gender and race ===
In 2014, a report published by SPARK Movement, an activist organization, stated that there was a large gender and race imbalance in the number of Doodles shown by Google, and that most Doodles were honoring white males. The report was widely reported in the media, and Google made a commitment to increase the proportion of women and racial minorities.

=== Religious holidays ===
Google typically abstains from referencing or celebrating religious holidays specifically in Doodles, or in cases when they do, religious themes and iconography are avoided. Google has acknowledged this as an official policy, stating in April 2018 that they "don't have Doodles for religious holidays", according to "current Doodle guidelines". Google further explained that Doodles may appear for some "non-religious celebrations that have grown out of religious holidays", citing Valentine's Day (Christianity), Holi (Hinduism), and Tu B'Av (Judaism) as examples, but the company does not include "religious imagery or symbolism" as part of those Doodles.

Google has been criticized for what has been perceived as its inconsistency regarding the implementation of its religious holiday policy, notably its lack of Doodles for major Christian holidays. Critics have pointed to its yearly recognition of the Jewish and Hindu festivals of Tu B'av and Holi, while Easter only received two official Doodles in 2000 and 2026 (and a themed homepage in 2019). Christmas is not specifically celebrated by name, although a Doodle with a seasonally festive and/or winter theme has always been present on December 25 since 1999. Since the mid-2010s, Google has also repeated their December 25 doodle on January 7, which is the date for Christmas in the Eastern Orthodox Church, but the word "Christmas" has never explicitly been used; the terminology "holidays" and "Eastern Europe" are used instead of "Christmas" or "Eastern Orthodox Church".

==== Easter ====
Google first created a Doodle for Easter in 2000, and would not do so again until 2026. In March 2013, Google was criticized for celebrating American activist Cesar Chavez on Easter Sunday with a Doodle instead of Easter.

In 2019, Google presented an atypical "Doodle" for Easter, for the desktop version of their homepage only. Unlike what is seen in virtually all other Doodles, the Google logo itself was unaltered in the presentation of the Doodle, and users had to click on the "I'm Feeling Lucky" button where "Lucky" is replaced with an anthropomorphic Easter egg, which triggered a falling array of Easter-themed items such as eggs, bunnies, and hot cross buns. Some of these items were hyperlinked, leading to a detailed page about Easter customs. Google's official Doodle archive page originally contained an unlisted entry for the 2019 Easter Doodle, which has since been removed. (Note: Although Wayback Machine's archival of the 2019 Easter Doodle's dedicated page did not record the actual Doodle logo or text, it is evident that a dedicated page was established at the URL "google.com/doodles/easter-2019" and later removed by Google just prior to the Wayback Machine's attempt to archive it, as archival of this URL was automatically triggered by the Wayback Machine on Easter Day 2019 (April 21), which is not the case for any other type of invalid URL in the google.com/doodles/ path index. The citation provided shows that the page was triggered for archival on April 21, 2019.) Notably, the 2019 Easter-themed homepage was not visible from mobile devices unless the "Desktop mode" option was triggered on the mobile browser, leading to the majority of users not ever seeing the "Doodle". Danny Sullivan, technologist with Google involved with the Easter-themed homepage, responded to an inquiry about its absence on mobile by saying it was "hard to do the interactivity dependably [on mobile]".

In 2020, Google once again celebrated Easter atypically on its homepage, but not as a Doodle. An Easter egg was placed below the "Google Search" and "I'm Feeling Lucky" buttons, with hovertext indicating "Happy Easter". When clicked, the egg led to a search results page for "Easter". This is similar to how Memorial Day and Remembrance Day have been recognized by the company in the US.

== See also ==
- Brand management
