= John Gunther's High Road =

American TV travelogue series (1959–1960)

- Written by: John Greene; Phillip Shuken
- Presented by: John Gunther
- Country of origin: United States

Production
- Producer: Jerry Stagg
- Production company: Blue J. Productions

Original release
- Network: ABC
- Release: September 7, 1959 – September 17, 1960

John Gunther's High Road is an American television travelogue series that was broadcast on ABC from September 7, 1959, through September 17, 1960.

== Format ==
Author John Gunther, who traveled the world, was host of this series and narrated it. The show ranged "from Manhattan to the Himalayas in search of program material". Subjects of episodes went beyond geographic locations to include topics such as jazz music and space travel, leading Gunther to summarize the series as "inside everywhere". Producer Jerry Stagg said the main theme of the series was "the story of man, or men, in the never-ending struggle to conquer obstacles in his environment or relations with other people." Guest hosts on episodes included Cesar Romero, Herb Shriner, and Walter Winchell.

== Production ==
Stagg and Blue J. Productions produced John Gunther's High Road, which was sponsored by the Ralston-Purina Company. John Greene and Phillip Shuken were the writers. Some of the films shown in the series were made on Gunther's trips. Most were made by others, but they showed places that he had visited. Those other sources included the Soviet Union and the United Nations.

The show was initially broadcast on Mondays from 8:30 to 9 p.m. Eastern Time, replacing Bold Journey. Beginning with the September 26, 1959, episode, it was moved to Saturdays from 8 to 8:30 p.m. E. T., where it remained until the series ended. Bourbon Street Beat took over the Saturday slot, and Jubilee, U. S. A. vacated the Monday slot to make room for John Gunther's High Road.

== Opportunities for teachers ==
Ralston-Purina made program-related teaching guides available for educators to use in their classrooms. That effort was supplemented by awards from the company to "teachers who made imaginative use of the program in their classroom teaching". The company awarded educational tours to 84 teachers in 1960, with many of the tours providing college credit for the recipients.

== Episodes ==
Partial List of Episodes of John Gunther's High Road
Date	Episode
September 7, 1959	"Song Of The Congo"
September 14, 1959	"Russia's Next Rulers"
September 21, 1959	"Togoland"
September 26, 1959	"Cuba
December 19, 1959	"Jamaica"
March 12, 1960	"Tanganyika Today"
April 9, 1960	"The Forgotten Land"

== Critical response ==
A review in the trade publication Broadcasting found several flaws in the premiere episode and said that only occasional moments came "anywhere near to offering the absorbing sort of television held out by the idea of exploring with John Gunther." The review said that presenting the story behind the African Ballet "was a passable and possibly good idea", with some of the dances being "fascinating". Eventually, the review added, the dances became repetitive, and it suggested that editing should have reduced the showing of dances to provide "a better explanation of how the many problems of molding talent from 20 diverse tribes into a dependable ballet company had been achieved."
