= Doodle Champion Island Games =

2021 browser game

- Cover art of the Doodle
- Developers: Google; Studio 4°C
- Publisher: Google
- Composer: Qumu
- Platform: Web browser
- Release: 23 July 2021
- Genres: Sports, action role-playing
- Mode: Single-player

Doodle Champion Island Games, sometimes also referred to as simply Champion Island, is a 2021 role-playing browser game developed by Google in partnership with Studio 4°C. The game acted as an interactive Google Doodle in celebration of the 2020 Summer Olympics and 2020 Summer Paralympics as well as Japanese folklore and culture. The story follows Lucky the Cat as she competes in sport events across Champion Matches to become the champion of the island, whilst completing multiple side quests by helping people who are in need. The Doodle was removed on 6 September 2021 by Google but can still be played in Google Doodle archives.

The game features seven different mini-games themed around sports that appeared at the Olympics, including table tennis, skateboarding, archery, rugby, artistic swimming, sport climbing, and marathon. The creator of the soundtrack is Qumu.

== Gameplay ==
Doodle Champion Island is a role-playing video game with elements of a sports game. The player controls a cat named Lucky around an island with seven different regions that resemble different Japanese locations and geography, such as bamboo forests and mountains. In each region, there are features of seven island champions who all specialize in a specific sport. The sports themselves are mini-games, where Lucky earns a Sacred Scroll upon winning the mini-game. By beating all seven champions and earning their scrolls, the player is named "Island Champion". The player can also join one of 4 teams each represented by a color and a creature from Japanese mythology. By competing in the mini-games, players accumulate points that are tallied onto a Global Leaderboard, with the highest-scoring team being rewarded the title of winner by the end of the Olympics.

All the mini-games cover different genres of video games. For example, the Artistic Swimming event takes the form of a Dance Dance Revolution style rhythm game, whilst the Skateboarding event features a trick system similar to Tony Hawk's Pro Skater.

Additionally, each region holds plenty of side quests for the player to seek out. These side quests involve Lucky helping out the residents of the island with a variety of tasks such as item fetching and trade sequences. Some side quests can also unlock harder versions of the original mini-games. All these side quests can earn the player a trophy which can be viewed in a house in the center of the island, named The Trophy House, with 24 to collect in total as of the Paralympics update.

As of the Summer Paralympic Games 2020, two new side quests have been added, with one leading to an advanced version of Rugby. There is also an advanced version of archery made available from the beginning. Players may also reset their progression (for instance, to switch teams) by 'leaving the Champion Island' (after talking to the Komainu gatekeepers present at the pier to Lucky's boat after all 7 scrolls have been obtained and side-quests completed, with the game's credits then being shown as Lucky departs the island on her boat or simply selecting “Start a new game” in Settings.

== Plot ==
Lucky the Cat in the center of the island. She is surrounded by the mascots of the 4 teams in the game, as well as 7 statues that point in the direction of each Island Champion. Lucky is also in front of the global leader board, which can display the current points of all the teams.

At the start of the game, Lucky arrives by boat at Champion Island, a place where everyone from around the world competes with each other. She is then confronted by two Komainu, who challenge her to a match of Table Tennis to test her skills. When Lucky beats the pair, they believe her to be The Chosen One and tell her of the seven champions of the island and that beating them would restore order to the island and make her the Island Champion.

Lucky can then choose the order to compete against the champions and beating each champion will earn her one of seven Sacred Scrolls. These are:

- The Kijimuna, a tribe that hosts marathons along a beach.
- Tengu, who masters table tennis in a village now abandoned in a bamboo forest.
- Princess Oto-hime and Urashima Taro, who compete in artistic swimming underwater.
- Yoichi, master of archery near the island's lotus pond.
- The Oni, a group of trolls who are champions of the island's rugby. In this event, Lucky is aided by Momotaro and his friends, the dog, the monkey and the pheasant.
- Fukuro, an owl who sits at the top of the island's mountain and observes the Climbing event.
- Tanuki, master of the Skateboarding event taking place in Tanooki City.

After obtaining all seven Sacred Scrolls and beating all the champions of the island, a large cherry blossom tree bursts into bloom in the center of the island, and falling petals rain over the island. The people of the island then congratulate Lucky on becoming the Island Champion.

If Lucky collects 23 of the 24 trophies, selecting the podium with no trophy reads the message "don't trust the bird", activating the final side quest. Lucky is then tasked with finding the true trophy master, who is revealed to be Momo, the black cat from Magic Cat Academy, the Google Doodle for Halloween 2016, 2020, and 2024. This changed when the Paralympics made their debut, and anyone who has completed the 22 previous side quests and plays the Paralympic game without starting afresh can complete the 23rd and 24th quests without losing history of the last quest.

== Development ==
The Doodle team collaborated with Studio 4°C to help produce the many anime-styled cutscenes throughout the game. In the early stages of development, the team researched for several Japanese folk stories and legendary characters, as well as mythical beings from Japanese folklore. As a result, the main character, Lucky (a calico cat), was made as it depicts luckiness. Each sport champion also features a legendary or mythical character.

The game itself acts as an homage to 16-bit gaming on top of Japanese folklore.

Art lead for Google Doodle, Nate Swinehart, said: "We wanted to make the Doodle for the Champion Island Games to really create an opportunity for the world to compete globally together and to learn Japanese culture at the same time."

The game's soundtrack was composed by Qumu, a music artist known for remixing video game music on YouTube.
