= USS Cavalier =

U.S. Navy attack transport ship, 1943-1968

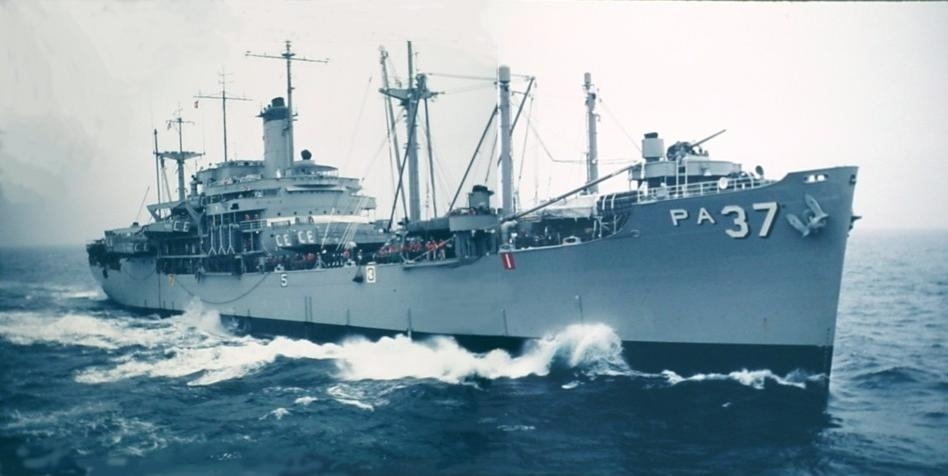
- USS Cavalier (APA-37) underway off Hong Kong, 1959

History

United States
- Name: USS Cavalier (APA-37)
- Namesake: Cavalier County, North Dakota
- Builder: Western Pipe & Steel
- Laid down: 10 December 1942
- Launched: 15 March 1943
- Sponsored by: Mrs M W Jackson
- Acquired: 19 July 1943
- Commissioned: 16 January 1944
- Decommissioned: 1968
- Stricken: 1 October 1968
- Identification: MC hull type C3-S-A2, MC hull no. 276
- Honors and awards: Five battle stars for World War II service, four for Korean War service and five for the Vietnam War
- Fate: Scrapped, 1969

General characteristics
- Class & type: Bayfield-class attack transport
- Displacement: 8,100 tons (lt), 16,100 t (fl)
- Length: 492 ft (150 m)
- Beam: 69 ft 6 in (21.18 m)
- Draft: 26 ft 6 in (8.08 m)
- Propulsion: 1 x General Electric geared turbine, 2 x Combustion Engineering D-type boilers, 1 x propeller, designed shaft horsepower 8,500
- Speed: 18 knots
- Boats & landing craft carried: 12 x LCVPs, 4 x LCMs (Mk-6), 3 x LCP(L)s (MK-IV)
- Capacity: 200,000 cu ft, 4,700 tons
- Troops: 80 officers, 1,146 enlisted; flag 43 officers, 108 enlisted
- Complement: 51 officers, 524 enlisted
- Armament: 2 x single 5"/38 dual purpose guns, one fore and one aft, 2 x twin 40mm guns, 2 x single 40mm AA guns, 18 x 20mm guns

USS Cavalier (AP-82/APA-37) was a Bayfield-class attack transport in the United States Navy. She was named for Cavalier County, North Dakota.

Cavalier was reclassified APA-37, 1 February 1943; launched 15 March 1943 by the Western Pipe and Steel Company, San Francisco, California; sponsored by Mrs. M. W. Jackson; acquired 19 July 1943; fitted out as an attack transport by Bethlehem Steel Co., Hoboken, New Jersey; and commissioned 15 January 1944.

== World War II ==
Cavalier cleared Davisville, Rhode Island on 17 February 1944 with men and equipment of two construction battalions, whom she disembarked at Honolulu 16 March.

=== Cesar Romero ===
In October, 1942, film star Cesar Romero voluntarily enlisted in the U.S. Coast Guard and served in the Pacific Theatre. He reported aboard the Coast Guard-crewed assault transport USS Cavalier (APA-37) in November, 1943 and saw action at Tinian and Saipan. He preferred to be a regular part of the crew and was eventually promoted to the rating of chief boatswain's mate.

=== Invasion of Saipan ===
After special amphibious training in the Hawaiian Islands, she sailed by way of Kwajalein for the invasion beaches of Saipan in the Joint Expeditionary Force Reserve. When stiff Japanese resistance was encountered on 15 June, Cavalier's group was summoned to unload reinforcements, and landings began at dusk on 16 June.

Working at top speed, since the Japanese fleet was known to be approaching, Cavalier landed her troops, but was ordered to retire before she could get off the artillery she carried. Leaving many of her boats behind for shuttle duty, she drew away to the east while the classic air Battle of the Philippine Sea was fought, then returned to the beachhead area on 25 June to complete offloading artillery and to embark casualties. Next day, Cavalier cleared for Eniwetok, where the wounded were put ashore, and cargo, including 37 tons of dynamite for use in underwater demolition, was loaded.

=== Invasion of Tinian ===
Returning to Saipan 13 July 1944, Cavalier delivered her cargo, and loaded troops and vehicles of the 2nd Marines for the assault on Tinian. She arrived off Tinian's "White Beach" on 24 July, successfully landed troops and vehicles, loaded casualties, and sailed on 28 July for Pearl Harbor.

=== Invasion of Leyte ===
After brief repairs, Cavalier joined in rehearsal landings in the Hawaiians, and on 15 September 1944, sailed for Manus, and final preparations for the Leyte landings, first step in the liberation of the Philippines. With the Southern Attack Force, she sailed on 14 October, and after a quiet passage, arrived off Dulag, Leyte on 20 October. Thorough planning and training paid off. Cavalier's boats landed troops and equipment smoothly. She remained off the beach, completing her unloading and receiving casualties, until 23 October, when she cleared for Manus on the eve of the Battle for Leyte Gulf.

=== Invasion of Luzon ===
After disembarking casualties at Manus, Cavalier sailed to New Guinea to load reinforcements, with whom she returned to Leyte on 18 November 1944. Then she returned to New Guinea to train for the Lingayen assault, for which she sailed 28 December in the San Fabian Attack Force. They suffered enemy air and surface attacks en route. On the night of 7 January 1945, Cavalier made the first radar contact with the Japanese destroyer Hinoki, later destroyed by the accompanying escorts of her group. Still later, other ships of her force were damaged by kamikazes.

On 9 January, Cavalier took position to launch her boats on White Beach where Japanese mortar fire damaged many of her barges. Unhesitatingly her men carried out assigned duties, although six were injured during the day. Three more were injured, one mortally, by exploding shrapnel during the dusk attack by suicide planes. As she retired from Lingayen Gulf next day, her gunners took a suicide plane under fire, only to see it crash into DuPage.

=== Invasion of Northern Luzon ===
Cavalier loaded troops at Leyte, and on 26 January 1945 stood out for the northern Luzon landings on 29 January. Since Philippine guerillas had secured the assault area 2 days previously, no opposition was met, and Cavalier set sail for Leyte the same day.

=== Struck by torpedo ===
On 30 January, while off Manila Bay, she was suddenly shaken by a violent underwater explosion, presumably a torpedo fired from the Japanese submarine Ro-115. Hit port side aft, Cavalier suffered 50 men injured, some flooding, and buckled decks. Engines stopped and steerageway was lost. Flooding and damage were quickly controlled, but since her propeller was jammed, she had to be towed by USS Rail to Leyte, arriving 4 February. Repairs there and at Pearl Harbor continued through 12 September.

== Postwar service ==
Sailing from Pearl Harbor to the Philippines, Cavalier embarked military passengers for transportation to San Francisco, where she arrived on 1 November 1945.

=== Tours of duty to China ===
From 1 January to 22 February 1946, she voyaged to Samar, Guam, Eniwetok, and Kwajalein, again to load passengers for San Francisco. Repairs there preceded a tour of duty off China from 5 May 1946 to 30 April 1947, from which she returned to San Diego.

A second tour of China duty from 25 March to 9 December 1948 found Cavalier picking up refugees, taking them to Shanghai and transporting rice furnished by American relief agencies for Chinese refugees at Qingdao. Three short cruises to mid-Pacific islands preceded a deployment to the Far East for which she sailed 3 April 1950.

== Korean War ==
Thus Cavalier was in Japanese waters upon the outbreak of the Korean War. She quickly prepared for the first amphibious landing of the conflict, and on 15 July 1950, sailed from Yokosuka with troops of the 1st Cavalry. They landed at Pohang on 18 July, and Cavalier returned to Yokosuka on 23 July.

Assigned to the daring Inchon invasion, Cavalier next cleared Yokosuka on 3 September, paused at newly secured Pusan from 5 to 12 September, and in the early evening of 15 September, came into position to begin the arduous landings over the seawalls of Inchon, against enemy resistance which stiffened with each assault wave. Cavalier remained off Inchon, receiving casualties, until 20 September, when she cleared for Yokosuka. In October, she carried men and ammunition to both Inchon and Wonsan, and on 1 November, cleared for San Diego, overhaul, and local training.

On 14 July 1951, laden with Marines, Cavalier once more departed San Diego for the Far East. Arriving at Kobe, Japan on 29 July, she replenished, and loaded additional small arms ammunition and provisions. On 5 August, she put into Pusan to offload men and cargo, returning to Japan for training operations through the fall. From 27 November to 7 December, she carried men and vehicles of the 45th Infantry to Inchon, and after operations in Japanese waters and a visit to Hong Kong, made a similar voyage to Inchon late in January 1952.

Cavalier returned to the West Coast on 23 April 1952, and took part in intensive training along the California coast and in Hawaii until 3 July 1953, when she again sailed for Yokosuka. From 1 to 27 August, she was at Inchon, aiding in the transfer of prisoners of war under the Korean Armistice Agreement, and after amphibious landing exercises off Japan, Okinawa, and Iwo Jima, returned to Long Beach, California on 23 April 1954.

== Peacetime service ==
From the close of the Korean War through 1960, Cavalier completed three tours of duty in the Far East, from 11 January to 4 October 1956; from 10 February through 12 December 1959; and from 16 February to 25 July 1960. Cavalier completed further tours in the Far East in the 1960s.

== Vietnam war ==
Cavalier APA-37 AUG 1964 - NOV 1964 Viet Nam - Gulf of Tonkin

Cavalier took part in a number of operations during the Vietnam War, from early 1964 until May 1968.

== Decommission ==
Shortly after her final Vietnam tour of duty, Cavalier was decommissioned. She was struck from the Naval Vessel Register on 1 October 1968, and sold for scrap in 1969.

== Awards ==
Cavalier received five battle stars for World War II service, four for Korean War service, and five for the Vietnam War.
