= Pac-Man Google Doodle =

Google Doodle version of Pac-Man, a 1980 maze video game

- The Google Doodle maze with the website logo
- Developer: Google
- Publisher: Google
- Release: May 21, 2010
- Genre: Maze
- Modes: Single-player, multiplayer

The Pac-Man Google Doodle is a maze video game made as a Google Doodle by Google and released on May 21, 2010, in celebration of the 30th anniversary of the release of Pac-Man (1980) by Namco. The first Google Doodle to not only be directly interactable but also be playable and have sound, Google's version of Pac-Man plays similarly to the original 1980 game in that the player controls Pac-Man to consume all the pellets in the maze while avoiding the four ghosts. Playable on both computer and mobile devices, it also replicates specific features of Pac-Man as produced by Namco like identical sounds and the glitches that occur upon reaching the 256th level. Unlike the original game, the 2010 game's maze is shaped around the Google logo in tradition of Google Doodle logos replacing the default one to celebrate holidays and anniversaries. Players can also enable an Easter egg for a two-player option to play as Ms. Pac-Man, a character from the 1982 game Ms. Pac-Man.

The Google Doodle version of Pac-Man, lacking an official name, was first developed a few months prior to the 1980 game's anniversary by a Google Doodle team led by programmer Marcin Wichary and doodler Ryan Germick, both of whom worked with Bandai Namco but recreated the game from scratch and made sure that it closely replicated the original game outside of the special maze. Wichary explained that his work on the project was inspired by his childhood experience with arcade games, especially due to his father being an arcade game technician who took him to arcades.

The Pac-Man Google Doodle replaced the regular Google logo for 48 hours, and attracted immense popularity and became viral on news media and social media. It was well-regarded by critics for its technical achievements relative to prior Google Doodles and was considered a great tribute to the Pac-Man franchise that anyone could try out. Due to popular demand, the game was made permanently available elsewhere within the Google website after the end of the Google Doodle event, along with an announcement of the game's "overwhelming popularity" from Google user experience vice president Marissa Mayer. A blog from time management software firm RescueTime reported, based on a user sample of about 11,000 people, that the game cost 4.82 million hours and US$120 million in productivity. Its report went viral on both mainstream news and social media, but Business Insider denounced it as relying on selection bias that assumed that users who played the Google Doodle would have been otherwise productive. In 2014, Guinness World Records recorded that users played the Google Doodle for about 500 million hours total.

== Gameplay ==
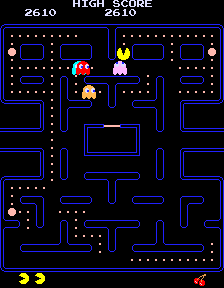
The original 1980 layout of Pac-Man. In comparison, the Google Doodle version's layout is horizontal, accompanying the name "Google".

Pac-Man is a maze video game produced by the game designer Tōru Iwatani under the video game company Namco (now merged under Bandai Namco) that was first released in Japan on May 22, 1980. In Pac-Man, the player operates a yellow figure named Pac-Man, who eats dots in a maze and is pursued by multiple ghosts (Blinky, Pinky, Inky and Clyde). The game was later released in October of the same year in the United States, selling successfully in markets and becoming a cultural icon. Pac-Man has been praised for its addictive gameplay and spawned various forms of media as a franchise in addition to appearing in other forms of media. Other games have been created within the Pac-Man franchise like Ms. Pac-Man (playable as the namesake character) in 1982, although it was created under a separate game company called General Computer Corporation and published by another named Midway Games.

A Google Doodle is a temporary alteration of the Google website's logo in celebration of special events like holidays and anniversaries. In honor of the 30th anniversary of the release of the first Pac-Man title in 2010, a Google Doodle of a playable version of Pac-Man was released. Sometimes referred to with title names like "Pac-Man Doodle", or "Pac-Man Google Doodle", the Google Doodle version of Pac-Man plays like the original version in that the player operates Pac-Man to consume all dots in a maze at a given level while avoiding the four ghosts. It features the same visual style, sound effects, and music, with Ms. Pac-Man having distinct sounds from Pac-Man. The main difference separating the 2010 game with its earlier counterparts is the layout of the maze – it is shaped around the letters spelling "Google" as is tradition for the temporary Google logo replacement. At the game's initial release, the player started the game by clicking the button that read, "Insert Coin", which replaced the "I'm Feeling Lucky" search feature. Alternatively, they were able to wait ten seconds for the game to automatically start. Pressing the "Insert Coin" button a second time spawned in a Ms. Pac-Man for the second player in the maze along with Pac-Man for the first. In the computer version, Pac-Man is controlled using the arrow keys while Ms. Pac-Man is operated with the WASD keys. On the mobile version, the player controls Pac-Man by swiping the screen to the direction that they want Pac-Man to go.

The Google Doodle also borrows several level features from the original game. For instance, between some levels are intermissions called "coffee breaks", which play brief animations to allow for the player to take quick breaks before they resume the game. Upon reaching the 256th level, the Google Doodle will hit a kill screen like the original game, meaning that it will severely glitch out to the point of half the game's screen being visually unparsable and thus render further progress impossible.

== Development ==
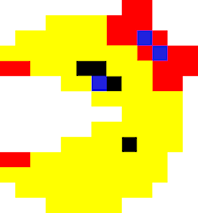
Ms. Pac-Man is included as a second player option and an Easter egg enabled by pressing the "Insert Coin" button a second time.

A few months prior to the game's release, the Google Doodle team found out that May 22, 2010, would mark the 30th anniversary of the release of Pac-Man. Like they had with various other holidays and anniversaries, they decided that they would create a Google Doodle celebrating the upcoming Pac-Man anniversary. Ryan Germick, a member of Google Doodle, said that he and his team thought that "it would be awesome to create not only something that references Pac-Man on the home page, but also something playable." While Google Doodle had before achieved the creation of animated Google Doodle logos like for Isaac Newton's birthday featuring apples falling down, the Pac-Man Doodle was intended to be "extra special". The Google Doodles team, consisting of Ryan Germick, senior user experience designer and programmer Marcin Wichary, and other staff members, partnered with Namco Bandai to build the game from scratch, using JavaScript, HTML, and CSS for game development and recreating sounds and graphics from the original game. The decision to rebuild the Pac-Man game from scratch rather than from getting code from Namco Bandai was deliberate on the part of the Google Doodle team, as Wichary wanted to be consistent in using web development for the Pac-Man Google project like with prior Google Doodles. The team made sure that the individual ghosts had different personalities (more specifically individual tactics for pursuing Pac-Man) and that glitches from the original game were also imported into the Doodle version. Ms. Pac-Man, Marcin Wichary wrote in the Google Doodle blog, was added to the Doodle as an Easter egg. Germick said that Wichary managed to create the "picture-perfect" version of Pac-Man, but the team had to design the layout of the game's maze to be centered around the Google logo.

In the Google Doodle blog and a CNET News article, Wichary said that he had been interested in arcade video games since his childhood in Poland. His interest was in large part from his father, an arcade game and pinball technician who took him to arcades in various coastal cities of Poland and allowed him to explore the engineering and programming of the games. Hence, one of Wichary's main reasons for his involvement in the 2010 project was to allow others to relive their childhoods. Such passions, he revealed, spurred his "commitment to authenticity" in the development of the Pac-Man anniversary game up to its "little quirks". The "Insert Coin" button served as a reminder of older times when people inserted many quarters in arcade machines to play games like Pac-Man; the feature of having to press the button twice for the two player option was a nod to arcade players inserting two coins for a multiplayer option in other arcade games. He wrote that Pac-Man "seems like a natural fit for the Google homepage" due to the "deceptive straightforward" natures of both that were "carefully hiding their complexity under the hood" and the "light-hearted, human touch" of both. A Google spokesman gave credit to both Wichary and Germick for their passionate work in making the 2010 Pac-Man game faithful to the original from 1980.

The Pac-Man Google Doodle was released on May 21 at 11:00 AM EST, replacing the Google logo for 48 hours as part of Google Doodles in honor of the original game's 30th anniversary. The Pac-Man game is the first interactive Google Doodle to have ever been released. It is also the first Doodle to have sound and the first to be playable. In a Google blog post, Google user experience vice president Marissa Mayer stated that by popular demand from the "overwhelming" success of the Doodle, the game would be made permanently available even after it no longer replaces the Google logo. The Google version of Pac-Man can be found in the Doodles Archive for users to play on. Due to the negative feedback regarding a lack of option to turn off the game's sound, Google later added a mute button. The Google Doodle was later brought back as part of the "Stay and Play at Home" event amidst the COVID-19 pandemic in 2020.

== Reception and impact ==
The Pac-Man Google Doodle attracted massive popularity and was positively received by online writers, with Matthew Shaer of The Christian Science Monitor referring to the Doodle as "among the most popular that Google [had] ever produced". The popularity of Google's Pac-Man game in 2010 was reflected in its virality on Twitter, with users joking about work productivity being lost on a large scale because of it. The virality of the game was to the point where Google decided that the game would not be forever gone after 48 hours of availability at the Google website, instead giving it a permanent link for players to visit. Nonetheless, many websites hosted download links for the Pac-Man Doodle in the event that Google would permanently take it down. Danny Sullivan of Search Engine Land, speaking from experience writing about Google Doodles up until the release of the Pac-Man Google game, expressed that it went far beyond what other Google Doodles had done before, especially due to it being the first playable Doodle. Wendy Rozeluk, a Google representative for Canada, referred to the Google Doodle team's commemoration of Pac-Man as "authentic" and considered it an example of the company's philosophy behind having fun. Bandai Namco president and CEO Kenji Hisatsune similarly reflected excitement towards the Google project, claiming that the Doodle's technical achievements demonstrate "just how big of an impact Pac-Man has made."

NBC News writer Ian Paul suggested that Pac-Man's surge in relevance from the Doodle was likely to recede, but asserted that the Doodle would be mentioned by future articles as one of Google's Easter eggs. He also pointed out an at-the-time popular conspiracy connecting the development of the Doodle to Apple Inc. This was elaborated on by Jared Newman of PC World, who noted that the JavaScript, HTML and CSS programs were what Apple Inc. co-founder and CEO Steve Jobs recommended should be used as alternatives to Adobe Flash Player. Newman suggested two possibilities for the tool choices, one being that Google agreed with Apple in creating a Pac-Man game with accessible and non-resource intensive programs unlike Flash and the other being that Google wanted a version of Pac-Man that could be run on Apple devices without having to be approved by the App Store. He acknowledged that the two possibilities are merely theories, however. In a retrospective article dating to 2023, TechRadar author Chris Rowlands said that the Google Pac-Man Doodle remained "one of the most memorable Doodles ever – and in our opinion, the best one so far." He remarked about the game's addictiveness, jokingly claiming that it could cost hours of web searching.

On May 24, 2010, Tony Wright of RescueTime, a time management software firm that examined users' website activities for individuals and businesses, wrote a blog report concerning user activity in Google as a result of Pac-Man. RescueTime took a random sample of about 11,000 people who spent a total of three million hours on Google the Friday that the Pac-Man Doodle was released and compared it to the previous week's Friday, observing that the average person spent 36 more seconds on Google. Wright speculated that 75% of people who saw the Google Doodle Pac-Man as the temporary Google logo did not know that it was actually playable. Citing WolframAlpha, since Google had about 504,703,000 total unique users accessing it, the user sample, if representative, would mean that the Google Doodle took up 4,819,352 hours and would have costed $120,483,800 in productivity total. Theoretically, he explained, the average Google user could have been paid $25 per hour for their activity, and the total cost of productivity could have been used to pay all 19,835 Google members for up to six weeks. The report's numbers were subsequently circulated in articles of multiple mainstream news sources because of the large costs calculated by the firm. On the other hand, on May 26 of the same year, analyst Pascal-Emmanuel Gobry of Business Insider said that the report from RescueTime made for "great PR" because of it having gone viral in news reports and social media, but disagreed that it was an accurate assessment of user activities and their effects due to selection bias (when individuals or groups in a sample differ from the general population of interest). More specifically, he argued that the selection bias stemmed from the assumption users were playing the Pac-Man Google Doodle in lieu of being productive and that in reality the presence of the Google Doodle event did not automatically change if people decided to be productive or not. In 2014, Guinness World Records Gamer's Edition 2015 recorded that the Pac-Man Google Doodle was played for 500 million hours total, which made it "the world's most costly game of Pac-Man."

On October 30, 2025, a new Halloween-themed Doodle was released to commemorate the 45th anniversary of the original game, featuring 8 levels with unique layouts, cutscenes, and fruits.
