= Magic Cat Academy =

Google Doodle games

- Title screen for Magic Cat Academy (2016)
- Developer: Google
- Publisher: Google
- Platform: Browser game
- Release: Magic Cat Academy: October 30, 2016; Magic Cat Academy 2: October 30, 2020; Magic Cat Academy 3: October 30, 2024
- Mode: Single-player

Magic Cat Academy is a trilogy of short browser games created as Google Doodles for Halloween which were released every four years. The first game, Magic Cat Academy, also known as Doodle Halloween 2016, was released on October 30, 2016. The second and third games, Magic Cat Academy 2 (Doodle Halloween 2020) and Magic Cat Academy 3 (Doodle Halloween 2024), were released on October 30 of 2020 and 2024, respectively. The series follows a wizardry school student, a black cat named Momo, who uses her magic wand to fend off hostile ghosts to save others. The player controls her spell movements using their computer mouse or touchscreen by drawing shapes matching the symbols on top of the ghosts to vanquish them before they get close to her. Each game consists of five levels, all of which have different bosses and settings. The first game takes place at the wizardry school, the second occurs in the deep sea, and the third is set in the earth's atmosphere.

Following a Halloween-themed Google Doodle in 2015, the Google Doodles team opted for a cat protagonist who defeats enemies using spells for the next year, coming up with various story concepts. Momo is directly based on a black cat of the same name owned by the Google Doodles artist Juliana Chen, who was responsible for the art, storyboard, and gameplay conceptions of the first game and was involved in production for the sequels. The fictional character Momo made appearances in a few other Google Doodles, namely Halloween 2017 Doodle and Doodle Champion Island Games. The Magic Cat Academy series was well-received by writers for its "addictingly" engaging and challenging gameplay along with the cute and spooky art style and creative design.

== Gameplay ==
Gameplay footage of Magic Cat Academy 1 featuring Momo the black cat. The player uses a computer mouse to draw shapes so that Momo can vanquish ghosts with matching symbols.

Magic Cat Academy is a series of interactive browser games released by Google online as part of the temporary Google Doodle alterations of the website's logo to celebrate certain events; the three games debuted on October 30 of their respective years in celebration of Halloween on October 31. In each of the three games, the player controls a black cat and wizardry school student named Momo who fends off ghosts using her magic wand. The ghosts come with different lines and other shapes above them, and certain ghosts may have multiple symbols above them. In this case, Momo has to correctly draw the shapes from left to right to vanquish the spirits. To do this, the player has to draw said symbol(s) on top of each of the ghosts using either their computer mouse or touch screen. Several of these symbols cause extra spell effects when drawn. For instance, a lightning symbol causes wide-ranging damage against ghosts, while the heart symbol effect heals Momo with one heart. Some, such as a circle that will apply a shield for her to absorb one hit from a ghost, have been added in later entries.

In the series' games, Momo has five lives total in a given level, each hit from a ghost counting towards one lost life. Should she lose all five lives, the game will save the player's progress to the failed level. The games' levels themselves occur in different settings. The first game, for instance, progresses from the school's library in the first level to its rooftop in the last. Each of the games has five levels total with escalating difficulty, all ending with different multi-combo bosses. The player earns points by vanquishing the ghosts, and the score is recorded in the top-right corner. A "kill tally" of ghosts is also present on the bottom of the screen. Once the player completes a game entry, they are given the option to share their final results via social media or email and can click on a link for a search query on the Halloween holiday.

== Plot ==
=== Magic Cat Academy (Doodle Halloween 2016) ===
The player controls Momo, a sorcerer cat who goes to a magic academy. The academy is infiltrated and ruined by a group of ghosts led by their boss Marshmallow, who ravage the study room, take Momo's spell book away from her, and kidnap her anthropomorphic friends. Momo consequently decides to fight back against them using her magic wand throughout five levels, taking place in the school's library, a cafeteria, a classroom and a gymnasium. Marshmallow uses Momo's spell book to become gigantic, but Momo confronts him using a flying broomstick and defeats him from above the tower. She then retrieves her book back, and her friends congratulate her.

=== Magic Cat Academy 2 (Doodle Halloween 2020) ===
It is revealed that Marshmallow has plunged down into the ocean, taking a ship of an aquatic sailor cat named Captain Sugar with him; Sugar dives down in an attempt to rescue her ship. Marshmallow's band of ghosts are summoned into the ocean with him, and they proceed to possess various marine animals. Momo plunges into the ocean to confront Marshmallow again, and one of her friends provides her with an air bubble to help her breathe underwater. The objective and the development of the game are the same as the first, with the only difference being that only that the action takes place under the ocean. Momo fights against ghosts and possessed animals such as an immortal jellyfish, a school of bogues, a vampire squid and an anglerfish. Momo also befriends Captain Sugar and reaches the final stage, which begins at an underwater fissure haunted by Marshmallow. The second phase takes place in an underwater volcano possessed by Marshmallow. Marshmallow is defeated and launched into space by the volcanic eruption, and Momo and Sugar have a celebration with all of their friends.

=== Magic Cat Academy 3 (Doodle Halloween 2024) ===
Marshmallow, after being launched into space following the events of the past game, finds a purple star and eats it. This results in him becoming more powerful, and his army of ghosts rises into the atmosphere. Momo's friends construct a magic broomstick and provide her with an air bubble so that she can challenge Marshmallow and his minions from space. The objective and the development of the game are exactly the same as previous games, only that the action takes place across the layers of the atmosphere. Momo fights the ghosts in five stages which take place in the Earth's tropo-, strato-, meso-, thermo-, and exospheres, respectively. In the process, Momo fends off against various natural phenomena in the atmosphere that are possessed by ghosts such as a giant golden-crowned flying fox, polar stratospheric clouds, red sprites and constellations. Before the final stage, Momo confronts Marshmallow and makes him spit out the purple star, which proceeds to enter the sun and turns it into an evil threat. Momo and Marshmallow team up to defeat the sun, and Marshmallow allows Momo to make the "hourglass" spell, which causes the sun's projectiles to slow down.

Both Momo and Marshmallow rejoice, and the purple star is ejected from the Sun. It consequently explodes into Halloween candy and falls into the Earth. All of Momo's friends, along with Marshmallow's ghost minions, congratulate Momo and Marshmallow on their feat and celebrate. It is later implied that Marshmallow and his ghost minions attend and graduate from the Magic Academy alongside Momo and her friends.

== Development ==
The game development of the Magic Cat Academy series was organized under multiple specialized teams to cover different areas like art, engineering, and production. The fictional character Momo was directly inspired by a real life black cat, also named Momo, who was owned by the Google Doodle artist Juliana Chen. Chen herself was involved in the creation of art, animation, and gameplay concepts for the 2016 Halloween Doodle game. Furthermore, the selected winner of the 2015 Candy Cup Doodle game was the Yellow Witch and her black cat, which drove interest for a cat hero in the next Halloween Doodle. The overall development team was involved in providing various story pitches, the one that was selected being about a cat wizard who defeats enemies using drawn spells. Chen pitched more specific story ideas for the cat wizard character, the first being where the cat brewed a "soup that was so good, it raised the dead," but the team scrapped it due to the story being too "abstract." Another story pitch involved a dog and cat duo dressed in wizard and witch costumes who fought against vacuums. The team later settled for a cat attending a wizardry school and rescuing it from ghosts, although they changed her motivation from getting her hat back from the ghosts to retrieving her book back from them. Chen also produced various concept art designs for Momo and the enemy ghosts. The final boss was designed to be "huge and intimidating" according to Chen, citing Baby Bowser from Yoshi's Island as an inspiration. Originally, the game had the player decide on whether they would have Momo save her friends from the apparitions, in which whoever was saved would appear in the ending. There were additional symbol variants that were scrapped for the first game such as the shape of the Eiffel Tower and "gag" spells such as a witch's hat that, if drawn, would place a real one on Momo's head.

Each of the three games was released on October 30 of the respective years in celebration of Halloween and replaced the main Google logo on its website for two days. Like with other Google Doodles, Magic Cat Academy is stored at the official archive for Google Doodle. The trilogy's games were released individually every four years from 2016 up until 2024, with the third entry being the likely final one. Stephanie Gu, the game's lead engineer, stated that her team envisioned the trilogy being where the Momo initially fights ghosts on land in the first game, into the sea at the second, and into space at the last; she said that while there are more ideas, the team was satisfied with the third game being the finale. The 2024 game's development process took four months. Gu revealed that they wanted the third game to differ from the two others by a plot twist in which Momo and Marshmallow team up to defeat a "greater evil", with the latter assisting Momo's spells by applying a time-slowing spell so that they can slow the enemy's attacks and save the planet from them. Juliana Chen, as the team's animator, had arachnophobia, and hence initially struggled to implement the idea of a spider boss but "somehow overcame her fear and made something that was vetoed as way too scary".

The 2016 Magic Cat Academy game was brought back twice for Google Doodle-related events outside of Halloween, once in 2017 as part of a spinning wheel for various interactive games created as Google Doodles in celebration of Google's 19th anniversary and the other time in 2020 as part of the "Stay and Play at Home" event amidst the COVID-19 pandemic. Momo made additional appearances in other Google Doodles, such as the Halloween 2017 Doodle as one of the trick-or-treaters of the ghost protagonist Jinx, who is eventually accepted by Momo and her friends, and in the 2021 Google Doodle game titled Doodle Champion Island Games.

== Reception ==
Since the release of the first entry in 2016, the Magic Cat Academy series has been positively received by writers, with several of them describing the games as "addictive". Rafael Fariñas of The USB Port said that the 2016 Google Doodle was among the many "amazing Halloween reactions" from "Internet giants" and that it proved that Google "remains a place that encourages creativity above all." Polygon writer Owen S. Good expressed that Magic Cat Academy was an "enjoyable video game" because of its "cute cat animations," supernatural themes, and challenging gameplay. Vox writer Aja Romano referred to it as an "exciting" game, expressing that it was difficult but that "there was something fun about seeing a cat take on all those scary ghosts." Alphi Chug of DesignAsia Magazine said that Magic Cat Academy stood out among its fellow Google Doodles as "one of the most engaging and fun experiences" because of the "engaging gameplay, adorable character design, and spooky atmosphere" that made the game unforgettable for people of all ages. Inverse editor Shannon Liao praised the 2024 entry for its "dramatic soundtrack and creatively designed bosses" along with the "epic" final cutscene. She reflected that the game experience somewhat reminded her of "playing Harry Potter on the GameCube in the early 2000s."
