= All Points West =

All Points West may refer to:

- All Points West (monodrama), a 1937 American monodrama by Rodgers and Hart
- All Points West (radio program), a Canadian talk program
- All Points West Music & Arts Festival, a former American annual festival held in Jersey City, New Jersey
