= Doodle4Google =

Google-sponsored annual competition

The 2010 Doodle4Google competition logo

Doodle 4 Google, also stylized Doodle4Google, is an annual competition in various countries, held by Google, to have children create a Google doodle that will be featured on the local Google homepage as a doodle.

== History ==
Google features logos on their homepage, usually for public holidays. In the past, events such as the beginning of spring, the anniversary of understanding DNA, or the invention of the laser have been celebrated. The original Google "doodle" was in 1998 when Sergey Brin and Lawrence E. Page were attending the Burning Man Festival, to show that they were out of the office and unable to help if the systems were to crash.

== Doodle 4 Google US ==
Submissions from all students in U.S. schools from kindergarten to twelfth grade. Parents/educators are required to submit doodles for their students.

=== Prizes ===
The winner's doodle will appear on the Google homepage. They will also receive a $30,000 scholarship to the college of their choice, a T-shirt with their doodle on it, a Google Chromebook, a Wacom digital design tablet, and a $100,000 technology grant of tablets or Chromebooks toward their school.

In 2019, the winner got a $30,000 college scholarship and a $50,000 technology grant for their school.

In 2025, the winner will get a $55,000 college scholarship and a $50,000 technology grant for their school

Previously the winner got a $30,000 college scholarship, a $50,000 technology grant for their school or a nonprofit organization, a trip to Google's headquarters in California, Google hardware, and "Fun Googley swag". Nobody has ever won two times.

=== Themes ===
Google chooses themes for the doodles to be based upon:

- My superpower is..." (2025-2026), Winner: Kameirah Johnson, Seattle, Washington, 10-12 grade level
- "My Wish for the Next 25 Years" (2024), Winner: Maisie Derlega, Washington, D.C., 10-12 grade level
- “I am grateful for…” (2023), Winner: Rebecca Wu, Washington, 6-7 grade level
- “I care for myself by…” (2022), Winner: Sophie Araque-Liu, Florida
- "I am strong because..." (2021), Winner: Milo Golding, Kentucky
- "I show kindness by..." (2020), Winner: Sharon Kaur Sara, Texas, 4-5 grade level
- "When I grow up I hope..." (2019), Winner: Arantza Peña Popo, Georgia, 10-12 grade level
- "What inspires me..." (2018), Winner: Sarah Gomez-Lane, Virginia, K-3 grade level
- "What I see for the future..." (2016), Winner: Sarah Harrison, Connecticut, 10-12 grade level
- "What makes me...ME." (2015), Winner: Akilah Johnson, Washington, D.C., 10-12 grade level
- "If I could invent one thing to make the world a better place" (2014), Winner: Audrey Zhang, New York, 4-5 grade level
- "My Best Day Ever..." (2013), Winner: Sabrina Brady, Wisconsin, 10-12 grade level
- "If I could travel in time, I'd visit..." (2012), Winner: Dylan Hoffman, Wisconsin, K-3 grade level
- "What I'd Like To Do Someday..." (2011), Winner: Matteo Lopez, California, K-3 grade level
- "If I Could Do Anything, I Would..." (2010), Winner: Makenzie Melton, Missouri, K-3 grade level
- "What I Wish For The World" (2009), Winner: Cristin Engelberth, Texas, 4-6 grade level
- "What if..." (2008), Winner: Grace Moon, California, 4-6 grade level

=== Regions ===
The competition ran across 10 regions:

1. Connecticut, Maine, Massachusetts, New Hampshire, Rhode Island, Vermont
2. New Jersey, New York, Pennsylvania
3. Delaware, District of Columbia, Maryland, Virginia, West Virginia
4. Florida, Georgia, North Carolina, South Carolina
5. Illinois, Indiana, Michigan, Minnesota, Ohio, Wisconsin
6. Iowa, Kansas, Missouri, Nebraska, North Dakota, South Dakota
7. Alabama, Arkansas, Kentucky, Louisiana, Mississippi, Tennessee
8. Arizona, New Mexico, Oklahoma, Texas
9. Colorado, Idaho, Montana, Nevada, Utah, Wyoming
10. Alaska, California, Hawaii, Oregon, Washington

== Doodle4Google Canada ==
Doodle 4 Google is also organized by Google Canada and the winning picture comes up on the Google homepage.

=== 2014 ===
The first edition of Doodle 4 Google Canada was held in 2014. The theme for the year's contest was “If I could invent anything, I would invent...”. The winner, Cindy Tang, a grade 11 student from Dr. Norman Bethune Collegiate Institute, Toronto, got to see her Doodle on the Google homepage on February 26.

=== 2017 ===
The theme for 2017 Doodle 4 Google competition is “What I see for Canada's future is...”. Google wants children to represent their views on what Canada will be like 150 years from now.

== Doodle4Google India ==
Doodle 4 Google is also organized by Google India and the winning picture comes up on the Google homepage.

=== 2009 ===
The first edition of Doodle 4 Google India was held In 2009. The theme for the year's contest was ‘My India’. The winner, Puru Pratap Singh, a 4th standard student from Amity International School, Gurgaon, got to see his Doodle on the Google homepage on Children's Day last year.

=== 2010 ===
The theme for 2010 Doodle 4 Google competition is 'My Dream for India'. Google wants children to represent their views on what India will be like 20 years from today through Doodle 4 Google. Some outline points given by Google are given :

1. A cleaner, greener India
2. Freedom from poverty
3. Education for all
4. The world's center of technology{bhayander}
5. Better roads, futuristic cities.

The contest was won by Akshay Raj, a class IX student of St Aloysius High School, Mangalore.

=== 2011 ===
The theme for 2011 Doodle 4 Google competition is 'India's gift to the world'. The Children were requested to imagine their own version of the Google logo based on this theme. Varsha Gupta won this year's Doodle 4 Google competition.

The top doodles in India entered an online vote on the Doodle 4 Google website. At this stage, the Indian public helped decide the winning doodles that best captured this year's theme. Any student between class 1 and 10 from any school in India can participate.

The contest was won by Varsha Gupta from Ryan International School, Greater Noida.

=== 2013 ===
The Theme for 2013 'Sky's the limit for Indian women' Gayatri Ketharaman, a 15-year-old Pune teenager, emerged as the overall winner for this year's Doodle 4 Google contest.

=== 2014 ===
The Theme for 2014 Doodle4Google competition was 'A place in India I wish to visit'. Out of 12 finalists, Vaidehi Reddy was declared winner on 12 November and her doodle 'Natural and Cultural Paradise – Assam' was featured on Google's homepage on Indian Children's Day, 14 November.

=== 2015 ===
The theme for the 2015 Doodle4Google competition was '"If I could create something for India it would be...". Nine year-old P. Karthik from Visakhapatnam was declared as winner for his doodle titled "Plastic to Earth Machine." Karthik's Doodle was featured on the Google India homepage on November 14 to celebrate Children's Day.

== Latin America ==
1. Mexico
2. Colombia
3. Argentina
4. Chile
5. Brazil
6. Peru
7. Honduras

== Asia ==
1. India
2. Philippines
3. Japan
4. Pakistan
5. Yemen
6. UAE
