= All Points West (radio program) =

All Points West is a Canadian radio program. Produced from the studios of CBCV-FM in Victoria, British Columbia, as CBC Radio One's local afternoon program for Vancouver Island, the program airs on that station and its rebroadcasters on Vancouver Island and the Sunshine Coast.

It formerly served as the provincewide afternoon program for all of British Columbia apart from Metro Vancouver, until CBTK-FM's Radio West replaced it in most of the province in fall 2011.

The program was hosted by Jo-Ann Roberts for twenty years. In 2015, Roberts retired in order to campaign against funding cuts to the CBC and pursue a political career. In January 2015, Robyn Burns took over as host of the program. Jason D'Souza hosted the program while Burns was on maternity leave. As of November 2019, Kathryn Marlow was the host of the program, covering for Burns maternity leave. Marlow previously covered the roll in 2016.

Following a stint in Toronto as host of CBLA-FM's weekend morning program Fresh Air, D'Souza returned as the permanent new host of All Points West in January 2023.
