= Bradley Beach School District =

School district in Monmouth County, New Jersey, US

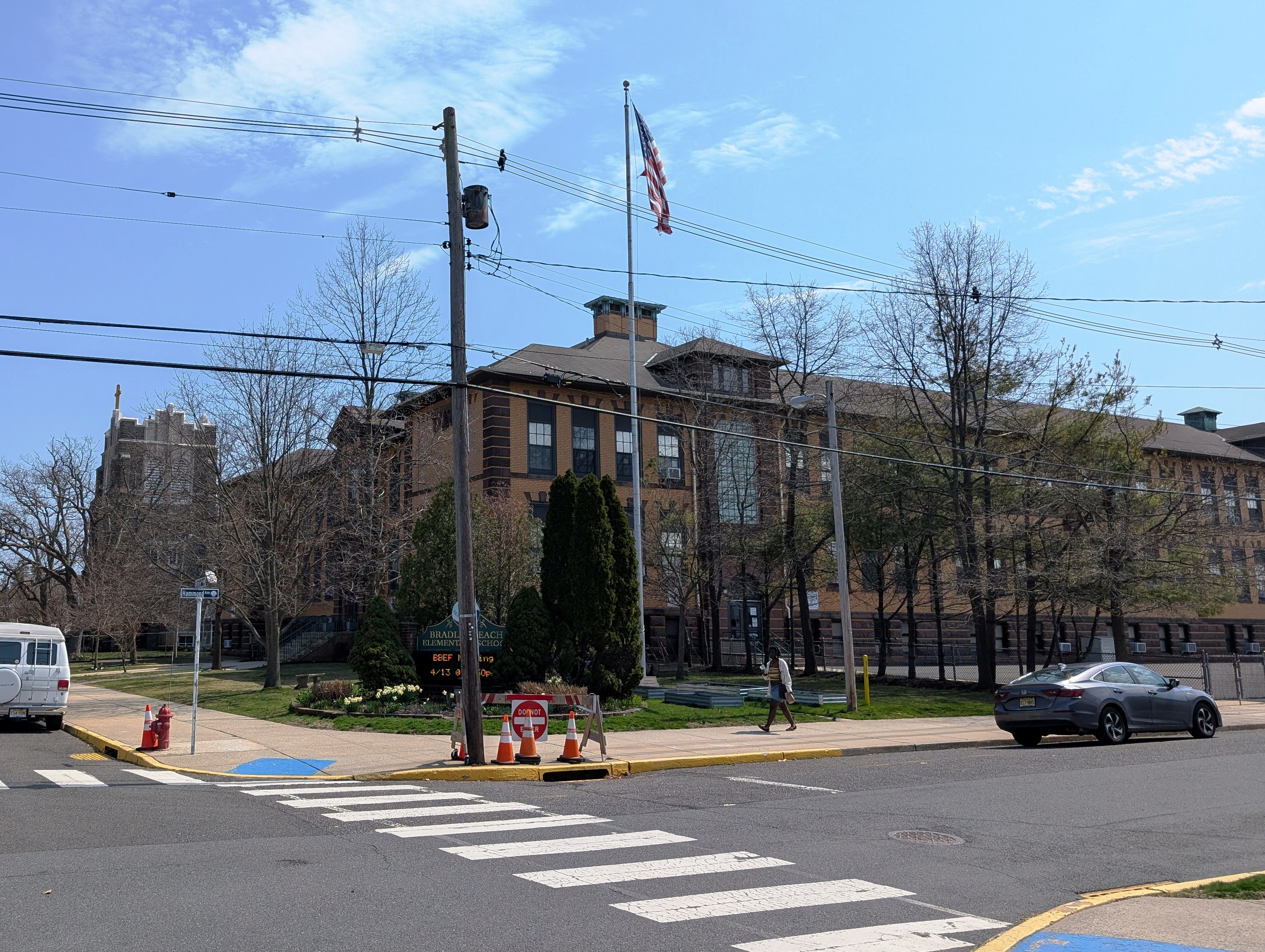
- Bradley Beach Elementary School, the only school in the district

Address
- 515 Brinley Avenue Bradley Beach, Monmouth County, New Jersey, 07720; United States
- Coordinates: 40.202426°N 74.014842°W

District information
- Grades: PreK-8
- Superintendent: Michael Heidelberg
- Business administrator: David Tonzola
- Schools: 1

Students and staff
- Enrollment: 196 (as of 2023–24)
- Faculty: 33.8 FTEs
- Student–teacher ratio: 5.8:1

Other information
- District Factor Group: CD
- Website: www.bbesnj.org
Ind.	Per pupil	District spending	Rank (*)	K-8 average	%± vs. average
1A	Total Spending	$20,099	45	$18,891	6.4%
1	Budgetary Cost	16,487	47	14,159	16.4%
2	Classroom Instruction	10,365	50	8,659	19.7%
6	Support Services	2,357	33	2,167	8.8%
8	Administrative Cost	1,582	31	1,547	2.3%
10	Operations & Maintenance	1,879	44	1,612	16.6%
13	Extracurricular Activities	264	54	104	153.8%
16	Median Teacher Salary	56,243	24	61,136
Data from NJDoE 2014 Taxpayers' Guide to Education Spending. *Of K-8 districts with up to 400 students. Lowest spending=1; Highest=71

The Bradley Beach School District is a community public school district that serves students in pre-kindergarten through eighth grade from Bradley Beach in Monmouth County, in the U.S. state of New Jersey.

As of the 2023–24 school year, the district, comprised of one school, had an enrollment of 196 students and 33.8 classroom teachers (on an FTE basis), for a student–teacher ratio of 5.8:1.

The district had been classified by the New Jersey Department of Education as being in District Factor Group "CD", the sixth-highest of eight groupings. District Factor Groups organize districts statewide to allow comparison by common socioeconomic characteristics of the local districts. From lowest socioeconomic status to highest, the categories are A, B, CD, DE, FG, GH, I and J.

For public school students in ninth through twelfth grades, the school district maintains sending/receiving relationships with the Asbury Park Public Schools and Neptune Township Schools under which the overwhelming majority of Bradley Beach students are sent to Asbury Park High School and the other 7% are sent to Neptune High School. As of the 2023–24 school year, Asbury Park High School had an enrollment of 370 students and 36.0 classroom teachers (on an FTE basis), for a student–teacher ratio of 10.3:1. and Neptune High School had an enrollment of 1,102 students and 91.0 classroom teachers (on an FTE basis), for a student–teacher ratio of 12.1:1.

An application program with Red Bank Regional High School or the schools in the Monmouth County Vocational School District are alternatives available for students from the borough attending public high school.

== School ==
Bradley Beach Elementary School served an enrollment of 196 students in the 2023–24 school year. The professional teaching staff includes 40 certified teachers and six paraprofessionals.

== Administration ==
Core members of the district's administration are:

- Michael Heidelberg, principal and superintendent
- David Tonzola, business administrator and board secretary

== Board of education ==
The district's board of education is comprised of nine members who set policy and oversee the fiscal and educational operation of the district through its administration. As a Type II school district, the board's trustees are elected directly by voters to serve three-year terms of office on a staggered basis, with three seats up for election each year held (since 2012) as part of the November general election. The board appoints a superintendent to oversee the district's day-to-day operations and a business administrator to supervise the business functions of the district.
