= Emerson Romero =

Cuban-American silent film actor and film captioning pioneer (1900–1972)

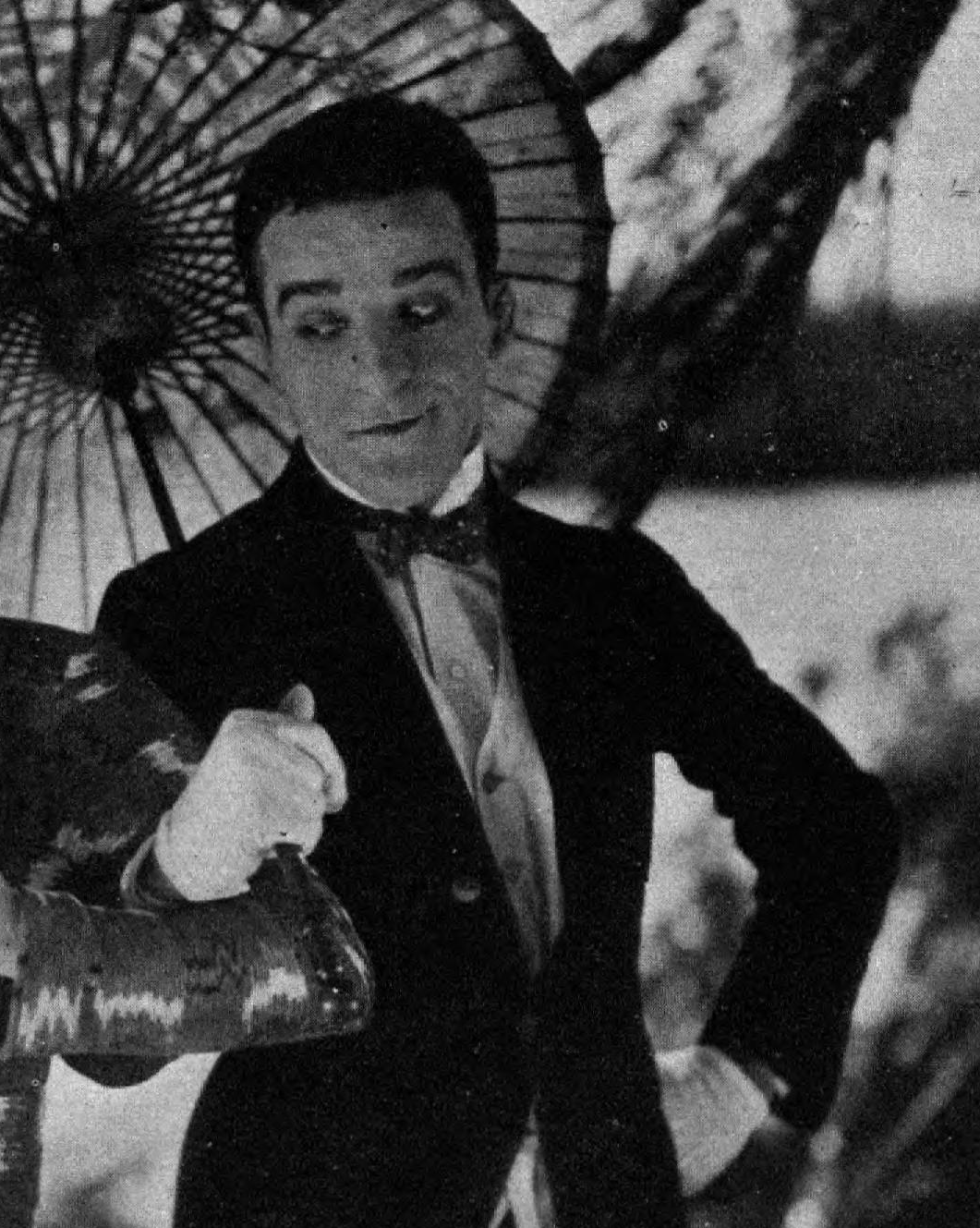
- Emerson Romero in Great Guns
- Born: Emerson Irving Romero; August 19, 1900; Havana, Cuba
- Died: October 16, 1972 (aged 72); Boulder, Colorado, U.S.
- Other name: Tommy Albert
- Education: Columbia University; Lafayette College
- Occupation: Actor
- Years active: 1926–1972
- Known for: Early efforts in film captioning
- Spouse: Emma Corneliussen (m. 1936)
- Children: 2
- Relatives: Cesar Romero (first cousin)

Emerson Irving Romero (August 19, 1900 – October 16, 1972) was a Cuban-American silent film actor who worked under the screen name Tommy Albert. Romero developed the first technique to provide captions for sound films, making them accessible for the deaf and hard of hearing; his efforts inspired the invention of the captioning technique used in films and movies today.

== Early life and education ==
Emerson Irving Romero was born August 19, 1900, in Havana, Cuba. He was a first cousin to film and television star Cesar Romero. At age six, Romero was deafened by a fever caused by whooping cough. He attended the Wright Oral School in New York City from 1907 to 1915. After completing that school's program he attended Stuyvesant High School for one year. He also attended Interlaken High School in Indiana and graduated from Blair Academy in New Jersey in 1920.

Romero spent one year studying at Columbia University in New York City and transferred to Lafayette College in Easton, Pennsylvania. After studying at Lafayette for two years, Romero was compelled to leave after his father had financial difficulties.

== Acting career ==
After leaving Lafayette College, Romero found work at the Federal Reserve Bank of New York. His older brother Dorian started a film company in Cuba, the Pan-American Film Corporation, and encouraged Romero to consider acting. Romero starred in a full-length film written by Dorian named A Yankee in Havana. In addition to acting, he also helped shoot film on location, edit films, and write subtitles. The films he starred in while in Cuba were commercially unsuccessful but Romero's acting skills drew attention from director Richard Harlan, who encouraged Romero to move to Hollywood in 1926.

From 1926 to 1928 Romero appeared in more than 24 two-reel short comedies, including Beachnuts, The Cat's Meow, Great Guns, Hen-Pecked in Morocco, Sappy Days, and a remake of Tillie's Punctured Romance. At the request of his film distributors, who wanted him to have a "more American-like" name, he changed his name to Tommy Albert. Romero did all his own makeup and stunt work and worked with actors such as W. C. Fields. The films he starred in are now believed to be lost. When sound films ("talkies") were introduced in 1927, deaf people were no longer considered potential actors; studios no longer included intertitles and deaf people were shut out of enjoying movies. In the fall of 1928, Romero returned to New York and his previous employer, the Federal Reserve Bank.

== Later life ==
Romero became active in the deaf community in New York City and along with friends John Funk and Sam Block started the Theatre Guild of the Deaf in 1934. The theatre company lasted for twenty years; Romero acted and directed in multiple plays throughout the years. In 1938 and 1939 he was the editor of Digest of the Deaf. He started a new career as a sheet-metal and template maker for Republic Aviation, helping to produce the Republic P-47 Thunderbolt fighter aircraft used in World War II.

Always looking for ways to help the deaf community, Romero bought several films and experimented with providing captions. In 1947, Romero developed the first captioning for a movie, splicing film strips and inserting images with captions between picture frames. The effect was similar to the title cards of silent movies, interspersing action scenes with images of text. He rented the films to deaf schools and clubs. The films were of bad visual quality, in an attempt to prevent bootlegging; in addition, Romero's technique ruined the soundtrack of the film for anyone who was able to hear. However, his efforts were noticed by others, including Edmund Burke Boatner, the superintendent of the American School for the Deaf, who would create more practical methods of captioning and would co-found the U.S. government-funded Captioned Films for the Deaf program.

Romero would go on to create and sell the Vibralarm in 1959, a vibrating alarm clock for deaf and hard of hearing people; he sold an entire product line of items for the deaf such as doorbells, smoke detectors and baby alarms. He retired from his job at Republic Aviation in 1965. In 1970 the New York City Civic Association of the Deaf honored Romero with its annual civic achievement award "in recognition of his tireless efforts and dedication to the deaf".

Romero and his wife moved to Boulder, Colorado in spring 1972; he died there on October 16, 1972.

== Personal life ==
In 1936, Emerson married Emma Corneliussen who went by the name "Connie". She was a graduate of Gallaudet University and previously taught at the New York School for the Deaf. With Emerson, she advocated for deaf education and community.

They had two children.

== Works cited ==
- Gannon, Jack (1981). Deaf Heritage: A Narrative History of Deaf America. National Association of the Deaf. ISBN 0913072397.
- Lang, Harry G.; Meath-Lang, Bonnie (1995). Deaf Persons in the Arts and Sciences:A Biographical Dictionary. Greenwood Press. ISBN 0313291705.
- Penn, John (1927). "A Deaf Movie Star". The Silent Worker. Vol. 39, no. 6.
- Schuchman, John (1999). Hollywood Speaks: Deafness and the Film Entertainment Industry. University of Illinois Press. ISBN 0252015266.
- "Colorado". The Deaf American. Vol. 25, no. 4. 1972.
