= Ms. Pac-Man (character) =

Pac-Man character

- Pac-Man character
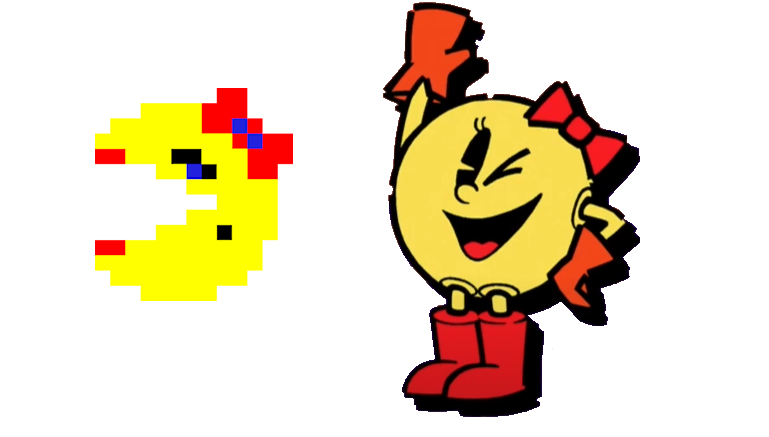
- Ms. Pac-Man as she appears in the original Ms. Pac-Man (1982) (left) and promotional material (right)
- First game: Ms. Pac-Man (1982)
- Voiced by: Barbara Minkus (TV series); Regina Reagan (Pac-Man World 3)

In-universe information
- Significant other: Pac-Man
- Children: Jr. Pac-Man; Baby Pac-Man

Ms. Pac-Man is a character from the 1982 video game Ms. Pac-Man, developed and published by Namco, The character was originally planned to be called Anna in a planned video game Crazy Otto, which became Ms. Pac-Man after Pac-Man distributor Midway Games acquired the rights to it. This character, also remade into Ms. Pac-Man, was suggested to be the star by a Midway representative. She was originally called Miss Pac-Man, though this was changed to avoid implying that she had her son out of wedlock.

While she has appeared in a number of games over the years, she stopped appearing in Pac-Man games following a re-release in the 2014 Pac-Man Museum due to what is believed to be a legal dispute between the owner of the royalty rights, AtGames, and Pac-Man creator, Bandai Namco. In several remakes and re-releases of older games, she was replaced with a character called Pac-Mom, which has been criticized by some critics, who believed it was an erasure of gaming history. She has been viewed as one of the first and most iconic female characters in gaming history, though she has been criticized for her design, with it being suggested that the tendency to depict female characters as derivative of a male character was reductive.

== Concept and creation ==
Ms. Pac-Man originated in the 1982 video game of the same name, which began as a different game, titled Crazy Otto, before being converted into a modified version of Pac-Man after the American Pac-Man distributor Midway Games purchased Crazy Otto. It was developed by General Computer Corporation (GCC) and distributed by Midway Games. At first, it was intended to be called Super Pac-Man, but it was eventually given the title Ms. Pac-Man. A Midway marketing employee, Stan Jarocki, exclaimed that Ms. Pac-Man was made to thank female arcade players for playing Pac-Man. Namco, the creator of Pac-Man, was reportedly unhappy with the existence of Ms. Pac-Man, ending their distribution deal with Midway in 1984, before gaining the rights to the Ms. Pac-Man name, though GCC retained royalties from the game and the Ms. Pac-Man brand. However, one of the designers, Steve Golson, argued that Namco's dislike for the game was a rumor, stating that Namco had been involved since Midway became involved. The royalty rights were later purchased from GCC by AtGames in 2019, resulting in a lawsuit by Bandai Namco (formerly Namco) which was settled in 2020.

Ms. Pac-Man was created after a Midway marketing employee, Stan Jarocki, suggested making the female character in Crazy Otto, Anna, the main character, as part of the shift into Ms. Pac-Man. First intended to be called Pac-Woman, she was later considered to be called "Miss Pac-Man. As the developers included a baby Pac-Man character, they did not want to suggest that Ms. Pac-Man had a child out of wedlock, and then decided to call her Ms. Pac-Man. She was initially designed with red hair, though Namco's then-President, Masaya Nakamura, asked them to instead give her a bow and beauty mark.

Ms. Pac-Man, as well as her titular game, have been the subject of legal disputes, with AtGames unable to make a Ms. Pac-Man mini arcade cabinet due to Bandai Namco refusing to approve it, with speculation that they did not want AtGames to receive royalties. In a re-release of Pac-Land, under the Arcade Archives brand, Ms. Pac-Man was removed, replaced by a character called Pac-Mom. This is believed to be due to a legal dispute over the use of the character. Pac-Mom has continued to replace Ms. Pac-Man in subsequent games, including Pac-Man Museum+ and the remakes of Pac-Man World and Pac-Man World 2. Ms. Pac-Man still appeared in Pac-Man Arrangement '05, a game included in Pac-Man Museum Plus after these updates.

== Appearances ==
Ms. Pac-Man first appears in the video game of the same name in 1982, where she is its protagonist, tasked with eating pellets while dodging ghosts, similar to the gameplay of the original Pac-Man. During intermissions, she is portrayed meeting and falling in love with Pac-Man before having a child with him. This game has been the subject of multiple re-releases on different platforms. She makes brief appearances in Pac-Land (1984) and Pac-Man World (1999).

Ms. Pac-Man appeared as a recurring character in the Pac-Man animated television series where she was voiced by Barbara Minkus and was given the nickname "Pepper".

Ms. Pac-Man starred in Ms. Pac-Man Maze Madness in 2000, a 3D, top-down action-puzzle game. The sequel to Pac-Man: Adventures in Time, titled Ms. Pac-Man: Quest for the Golden Maze, was released in 2001. Ms. Pac-Man is a playable character in Mario Kart Arcade GP (2005), Pac-Man World Rally (2006), and Sonic Dash (2013). Her last reported appearance in a Pac-Man re-release was in the 2014 release of Pac-Man Museum, failing to appear in later entries due to legal issues.

As part of breast cancer awareness, Bandai Namco held a Ms. Pac-Man Pink Ribbon Campaign, where players could purchase a pink maze in various Pac-Man games on mobile phones, with all proceeds going to the National Breast Cancer Foundation.

== Reception ==
Ms. Pac-Man has been considered the first female lead character in a video game, though Polygon writer, Patricia Hernandez, argued that she was not an "actual person" and not having her own name disqualified her, a sentiment shared by GamesRadar+ writer, Dustin Bailey. A writer for Polygon said that Ms. Pac-Man's "simplistic and stereotypical" presentation limited her appreciation of the character as the first playable depiction of a woman, though she acknowledged that technical limitations played a role in her overtly feminine design. Nevertheless, Polygon staff regarded her as one of the most famous female video game characters, calling her "unforgettable." GameSpot writers, Steve Watts and Gabe Gurwin, while arguing that Princess Peach was the most famous woman in video games, suggested Ms. Pac-Man was the only character with similar fame. Esquire staff ranked her as among the best video game characters, noting how her design and personality, as well as her game's superior gameplay, helped her stand apart from Pac-Man as a character. Destructoid writer, Chris Moyse, criticized Bandai Namco for removing Ms. Pac-Man from certain video game re-releases and remakes, arguing that they were removing an important female character from video game history. He felt that this would continue to be the case, believing that the decision was financially motivated. Nintendo Life writer, Alana Hagues, was similarly disappointed, feeling that Ms. Pac-Man had made iconic appearances at various points in the series.

Ms. Pac-Man's depiction as a woman has been the subject of commentary and criticism. Pop Matters writer, G. Christopher Williams, discussed the tendency of video games to portray "rather traditional assumptions of heterosexual relationships," specifically men's primary motivation being to pursue women. He argued that the relationship between Pac-Man and Ms. Pac-Man was tangential to the actual premise of the game. Kill Screen writer, Rachel Helps, discussed the tendency to represent female characters by redesigning male characters with female features. She cited designer Anjin Anhut's views on the problematic nature of making male the 'default' and limiting girly-looking features to girls, who noted how female characters having derivative male versions was a comparative rarity. While discussing the design of the gender swap feature in Shovel Knight, developer Yacht Club Games sought to avoid making them designed like Ms. Pac-Man, feeling that the idea of making a female character be akin to a male character but with a bow or dress would be regressive. The Guardian columnist, Charlie Brooker, noted how, where Pac-Man did not have explicit male identifiers in his design, Ms. Pac-Man had to have female identifiers, like lipstick, a beauty mark, and a bow. He commented that, despite her portrayal possibly coming off as "patronizing," it was a more progressive depiction than many female characters in the early 2010s, specifically arguing that the industry tended to depict women as damsels or hypersexualized.
