= Now Production =

Japanese video game developer

Now Production Co., Ltd.
- Native name: 株式会社ナウプロダクション
- Romanized name: Kabushiki-gaisha Nau Purodakushon
- Type: Private
- Industry: Video game
- Founded: June 17, 1986; 40 years ago
- Founder: Yutaka Nakata
- Headquarters: Chūō-ku, Osaka, Japan
- Key people: Toshiaki Awamura
- Products: Video games Mobile games Pachinko machines
- Revenue: ¥75 million
- Operating income: ¥2.70 billion (2018)
- Number of employees: 109 (2021)
- Website: www.nowpro.co.jp
- Footnotes "Company Overview". www.nowpro.co.jp. Japan: Now Production. November 2018. Archived from the original on July 16, 2020.

Now Production Co., Ltd. (Note: Japanese: 株式会社ナウプロダクション, Hepburn: Kabushiki-gaisha Nau Purodakushon) (stylized as NOWPRO) is a Japanese video game developer headquartered in Chūō-ku, Osaka. Founded in 1986, it started developing various games for major companies including Namco, Hudson Soft, Capcom, Activision, Taito, Konami, Sega, and Nintendo. The company used to have a development department in East Ikebukuro, Toshima-ku, but it is now closed. Now Production has also been developing and selling software applications for iPhone and iPod Touch since 2009.

== List of games ==
=== Family Computer / Nintendo Entertainment System ===
- Metro-Cross (1986)
- Taito Grand Prix: Eikou heno License (1987)
- Spelunker II: Yūsha e no Chōsen (1987)
- Jikuu Yuuden: Debias (1987)
- Yokai Dochuki (1988)
- Wagan Land (1989)
- Splatterhouse: Wanpaku Graffiti (1989)
- Jackie Chan's Action Kung Fu (1990)
- Yo! Noid (1990) (originally in Japan as Kamen no Ninja Hanamaru)
- Wagan Land 2 (1990)
- Adventure Island II (1991)
- Adventure Island III (1992)
- Ms. Pac-Man (1993)
- Master Takahashi's Adventure Island IV (1994)

=== Game Boy ===
- Mickey's Dangerous Chase (1991)
- Dig Dug (1992)
- Barcode Boy: Kattobi Road (1993)
- Adventure Island II: Aliens in Paradise (1993)

=== Game Boy Advance ===
- Klonoa: Empire of Dreams (2001)
- Klonoa 2: Dream Champ Tournament (2002)
- WTA Tour Tennis (2002)
- Gachinko Pro Yakyuu (2002)
- Goemon: New Age Shutsudō! (2002)
- Silent Scope (2002)
- Metal Max 2 Kai (2003)
- One Piece: Going Baseball (2004)

=== Game Boy Color ===
- Dance Dance Revolution GB (2000)
- Dance Dance Revolution GB2 (2000)
- Detanabi Pro Yakyuu (2000)
- Detanabi Pro Yakyuu 2 (2001)
- Dance Dance Revolution GB3 (2001)
- Dance Dance Revolution GB Disney Mix (2001)
- Oha Star Dance Dance Revolution GB (2001)

=== Game Gear ===
- Wagan Land (1991)
- Pac-Attack (1994)

=== GameCube ===
- Sonic Adventure DX: Director's Cut (2003)
- Mario Superstar Baseball (2005)
- Sonic Riders (2006)

=== Sega Mega Drive / Genesis ===
- Quad Challenge (1991)
- Splatterhouse 2 (1992)
- Splatterhouse 3 (1993)
- Rolling Thunder 3 (1993)

=== Mobile ===
- Obey Me!

=== Neo Geo ===
- Neo Bomberman (1997)

=== Nintendo DS ===
- Nazotte Oboeru Otona no Kanji Renshuu Kanzenban (2007)
- Shoho Kara wa Hajimeru Otona no Eitango Renshuu (2008)
- Unsolved Crimes (2008)
- Zero Kara Hajimeru: Otona no 5-Kokugo Nyuumon (2008)
- Bakugan Battle Brawlers (2009)
- Kodawari Saihai Simulation: Ocha no Ma Pro Yakyuu DS (2009)
- Imi Gawakaru Otona no Jukugo Renshuu: Kadokawa Ruigo Shinjiten Kara 5-Man Mon (2009)
- WireWay (2009)
- Nazotte Oboeru Otona no Kanji Renshuu Kaiteiban (2010)
- Zoobles! Spring to Life! (2011)

=== Nintendo Switch ===
- Deadly Premonition 2: A Blessing in Disguise (2020)
- Pac-Man Museum+ (2022)
- Pac-Man World Re-Pac (2022)
- Pac-Man World 2 Re-Pac (2025)

=== Nintendo Switch 2 ===
- Pac-Man World 2 Re-Pac (2025)

=== PC Engine / TurboGrafx-16 ===
- Chew Man Fu (1990)
- Bravoman (1990)
- Dragon Saber (1991)
- Final Soldier (1991)
- Jackie Chan's Action Kung Fu (1991)
- Doraemon: Nobita no Dorabian Night (1991 and 1992)
- Samurai Ghost (1992)
- New Adventure Island (1992)
- Power Tennis (1993)

=== PlayStation ===
- Namco Museum Vol. 1 (1995)
- Namco Museum Vol. 3 (1996)
- Digical League (1997)
- Smash Court 2 (1998)
- Block Kuzushi (1999)
- Dragon Valor (1999)
- Extreme Go-Kart Racing (2000)
- Rescue Shot (2000)
- Ganbare Goemon: Oedo Daikaiten (2001)
- Goemon: Shin Sedai Shūmei! (2001)
- Big League Slugger Baseball (2003)

=== PlayStation 2 ===
- Ninja Assault (2002)
- Surfing Air Show with Rat Boy (2002)
- Gachinko Pro Yakyuu (2003)
- Katamari Damacy (2004)
- Smash Court Tennis Pro Tournament 2 (2004)
- Demon Chaos (2005)
- We Love Katamari (2005)
- Twinkle Star Sprites: La Petite Princesse (2005)
- Sonic Riders (2006)
- Bakugan Battle Brawlers (2009)

=== PlayStation 3 ===
- Bakugan Battle Brawlers (2009)

=== PlayStation 4 ===
- Pac-Man Museum+ (2022)
- Pac-Man World Re-Pac (2022)
- Pac-Man World 2 Re-Pac (2025)

=== PlayStation 5 ===
- Pac-Man World Re-Pac (2022)
- Pac-Man World 2 Re-Pac (2025)

=== PlayStation Portable ===
- Higanjima (2005)
- PQ: Practical Intelligence Quotient (2005)
- PQ2: Practical Intelligence Quotient 2 (2006)
- Undead Knights (2009)

=== Super Famicom / Super Nintendo Entertainment System ===
- Super Power League (1993)
- King of the Monsters 2 (1993)
- Miracle Girls (1993)
- Super Kyuukyoku Harikiri Stadium 2 (1994)
- Super Power League 2 (1994)
- Super Power League 3 (1995)
- Supapoon (1995)
- Supapoon DX (1996)
- Super Power League 4 (1996)

=== Wii ===
- Sonic and the Secret Rings (2007)
- Mario Super Sluggers (2008)
- Little League World Series Baseball 2008 (2008)
- Little League World Series Baseball 2009 (2009)
- The Munchables (2009)
- Bakugan Battle Brawlers (2009)
- Transformers: Prime – The Game (2012)

=== Xbox ===
- Sonic Riders (2006)

=== Xbox 360 ===
- Beautiful Katamari (2007)
- Bakugan Battle Brawlers (2009)

=== Xbox One ===
- Pac-Man Museum+ (2022)
- Pac-Man World Re-Pac (2022)
- Pac-Man World 2 Re-Pac (2025)

=== Xbox Series X/S ===
- Pac-Man World Re-Pac (2022)
- Pac-Man World 2 Re-Pac (2025)

=== Mobile ===
- Godzilla Battle Line (2021)
