= Pac-Man 2: The New Adventures =

1994 video game

- Genesis version cover art
- Developer: Namco
- Publishers: JP: Namco; NA: Namco Hometek; EU: Nintendo
- Composer: Katsuro Tajima
- Series: Pac-Man
- Platforms: SNES, Sega Genesis
- Release: SNES: JP: August 26, 1994; NA: September 1994; EU: 1994; Genesis: NA: November 1994
- Genre: Adventure
- Mode: Single-player

Pac-Man 2: The New Adventures, known in Japan as Hello! Pac-Man (ハロー! パックマン, Harō! Pakkuman), is a 1994 side-scrolling adventure game in the Pac-Man series developed and published by Namco. Instead of being a maze game like the majority of its predecessors, Pac-Man 2 incorporates light point-and-click adventure game elements. The game borrows its structure and certain elements from Pac-Land, and also appears to contain certain elements from the animated series, such as Pac-Man's family and a main villain commanding the ghosts.

The game was released in 1994 for the Super Nintendo Entertainment System, and was released for the Sega Genesis exclusively in the US.

== Gameplay ==
In-game screenshot of Pac-Man looking at an apple tree

Pac-Man 2: The New Adventures is a graphic adventure game, a vast departure from its predecessors. Players assume the role of Pac-Man as he must carry out different quests given to him by other characters. Many of these involve retrieving a specific item, such as a bottle of milk or a flower. Unlike other adventure games, players cannot control Pac-Man directly, who will wander and interact with the in-game world at his own pace. Instead, players use a slingshot to guide, or "influence" Pac-Man to his destination or to attract his attention towards a specific object. The player is able to also use the slingshot on Pac-Man, which can result in various changes to Pac-Man's current mood, or can wake him up after fainting.

In each quest, the player will need to solve puzzles to progress. The solutions to these puzzles are based on Pac-Man's moods, which differ based on the player's actions. For example, the player can shoot down an apple from a tree, which Pac-Man will eat and makes him happier, while shooting Pac-Man in the face will make him irritated or depressed. Pac-Man's moods will also determine how cooperative he becomes; for instance, making Pac-Man too happy will cause him to become smug and cocky, and as a result less willing to follow the orders of the player. Some sections of the game follow Pac-Man riding on a hang glider or in a minecart through "chase" scenes, which require fast-reflexes from the player. Pac-Man may sometimes encounter his enemies Blinky, Pinky, Inky, and Clyde, where he will immediately become frightened and run around the screen. Feeding Pac-Man a Power Pellet, stored in an inventory at the bottom corner of the screen, will transform him into Super Pac-Man; giving him the ability to fly at high speeds and eat the ghosts. If the player visits an arcade, they can play the original Pac-Man. Finding three game cartridges across locations in the game will allow them to play Ms. Pac-Man in the SNES version or a new original game, titled Pac-Jr., in the Sega Genesis version.

== Plot ==
After an introductory sequence in which Pac-Man introduces himself and the game's mechanics, the plot unfolds as a loosely connected series of misadventures stemming from Pac-Man's quest to complete tasks for his family, all while the ghosts and their mysterious leader plot to destroy him. Pac-Man is first tasked with finding milk for Pac-Baby, which he procures from the local farm. Sometime after, Pac-Man is asked by Ms. Pac-Man to pick a special flower for Lucy, a friend of Pac-Jr.'s, for her birthday. Pac-Man is given a trolley ticket which he uses to venture into the nearby mountains, hang-gliding and dodging ghosts and boulders as he searches for the flower. Upon returning home with the flower, Pac-Man is exasperated to find that Lucy's party has already started and that she has already been given another flower. Sometime after, Pac-Jr. comes home very sad and tells his father that his guitar was stolen by ghosts while he was in Pac-City. Pac-Man is given a train ticket to travel to the city, where he takes on the ghosts; disguised as a security guard, to get the guitar back. In the final segment of the game, Pac-Man discovers from a news report that the ghosts are stealing ABC gum from children all over Pac-City, at which point the Ghost Witch of Netor takes over the broadcast and challenges Pac-Man to face her and her newly created Gum Monster. He sets off to work his way through the abandoned factory where the monster is being created. Pac-Man eventually reaches the secret hideout of the Ghost Witch, in which a final battle between Super Pac-Man and the Gum Monster takes place. Super Pac-Man defeats the Gum Monster, with the Ghost Witch and her minions fleeing to plan their next scheme. Despite not being able to save the children's ABC gum, Pac-Man is congratulated by the town and his family as a hero.

== Reception ==
Reception

Review scores
Publication	Score
Famitsu	9/10, 8/10, 8/10, 8/10 (SFC)
PlayStation Magazine (JP)	(SNES) 23.9/30

GamePro held that on the one hand the game is innovative, intriguing, and sometimes fun, but on the other hand the inability to control Pac-Man directly can be annoying and the game sometimes makes one wish for the simplicity of the original Pac-Man. Their review of the Genesis version was more positive. While the reviewer acknowledged that the gameplay is "an acquired taste", he wholeheartedly approved of the innovative challenge, and also praised the game's humorous animations and gibberish voicing. In November 1994, Famitsu magazine's Reader Cross Review gave the Super Famicom version of the game a 7 out of 10.

Entertainment Weekly gave the game a C− and wrote that "Of course, there's nothing wrong with updating old boomer faves, but some games don't translate as well as others. The original Pac-Man, for instance, was wonderfully algebraic in its simplicity: An animated yellow dot scoots around a maze, gobbling up (or running away from) pursuing ghosts. Pac-Man 2: The New Adventures is a Super Mario-type action game hampered by what Namco calls its 'character guidance interface.' Players can't control Pac directly: they influence his actions by calling attention to obstacles. Sound frustrating? It is. I needed a dozen tries just to figure out how to play this game."
