= Demon Chaos =

2005 video game

- Developers: Genki, Now Production
- Publishers: JP: Genki; PAL: Konami
- Platform: PlayStation 2
- Release: PlayStation 2: JP: November 24, 2005; EU: April 27, 2007; AU: May 11, 2007; PlayStation Network: JP: August 20, 2014
- Genres: Hack and slash, Action
- Mode: Single-player

Demon Chaos known in Japan as Ikusagami (戦神; lit. "War God"), is a video game co-developed by Genki and Now Production for the PlayStation 2 (PS2) home game console. The game was published by Genki in Japan on November 24, 2005, and by Konami in PAL regions in 2007.

It is set in feudal Japan in the 16th century and revolves around a priestess who has been given eternal youth until she exterminates all the demons. She has been given charge of a mystical beast from the gods, Inugami, which is controlled by the player.

The game is in the vein of the well-known Dynasty Warriors series, in which the player battles crowd after crowd of hostile enemies. The unique aspect of the game is that up to 65,535 enemies can be on-screen at once.

== Reception ==
Reception

Review score
Publication	Score
Power Unlimited	55%

Demon Chaos received mostly mediocre reviews, currently holding a 62 out of 100 on Metacritic.
