= Pac-Man World 2 =

2002 video game

- Packaging artwork
- Developer: Namco Hometek (Note: The Game Boy Advance version was developed by Full Fat.)
- Publishers: Namco Hometek: JP: Namco; EU: Sony Computer Entertainment (PS2); EU: Electronic Arts (GCN); EU: Zoo Digital Publishing (GBA) Windows; EU: Light & Shadow Production; NA: Hip Games
- Director: Jesse Taylor
- Producers: Glen Cureton; Matt Sentell
- Programmers: Gil Colgate; Dai Matsumoto
- Artists: Vince Joly; Mike Witt; Monty Kane
- Composer: David Logan
- Series: Pac-Man
- Platforms: GameCube; PlayStation 2 Xbox; Game Boy Advance; Windows
- Release: February 26, 2002: PlayStation 2; NA: February 26, 2002; JP: July 25, 2002; EU: February 28, 2003 GameCube; NA: March 12, 2002; EU: March 21, 2003 Xbox; NA: October 15, 2002 Windows; EU: March 21, 2004; NA: May 25, 2004 Game Boy Advance; EU: August 19, 2005; NA: October 17, 2005
- Genre: Platform
- Modes: Single-player, multiplayer

Pac-Man World 2 (Note: パックマンワールド2, Pakkuman Wārudo Tsū) is a 2002 3D platform game developed and published by Namco Hometek for the Xbox, GameCube, and PlayStation 2. A version of the game for Microsoft Windows was released in 2004, and an abridged version for the Game Boy Advance was released in 2005. The game is a sequel to Pac-Man World (1999), and sees Pac-Man on a quest to retrieve the stolen Golden Fruit and stop the ancient ghost Spooky from terrorizing Pac-Land. The game received mixed reviews from critics, who praised its level design and soundtrack but criticized its camera system.

A sequel, Pac-Man World 3, was released in 2005. A remake, Pac-Man World 2 Re-Pac, was released in September 2025.

== Gameplay ==
Gameplay of Pac-Man in the game's first level

Pac-Man World 2 is a 3D platforming game in which the player controls Pac-Man and must navigate him to the end of each level. The player can use multiple abilities; these include the Rev Roll, a move where the player charges forward, which can be used to attack enemies and cross gaps; the Butt-Bounce, which can press switches and attack enemies from above; and a jumping Flip Kick to strike airborne enemies. Each level features Pac-Dots and fruit to collect, which will increase the player's score for the level. Collecting special Power Pellets will also give Pac-Man temporary power-ups. These power-ups can turn Pac-Man into metal, sinking him into water and making him immune to hazards; shrink him, allowing access to certain parts of a level; or temporarily allow him to eat ghost enemies. Pac-Man possesses a health bar with only three segments; if he takes damage after all three segments are depleted, the player will lose a life and be sent back to the previous checkpoint. After completing any non-boss level, the player can choose to replay it in Time Trial mode, challenging the player to reach the end as quickly as possible. During the time trial, fruits and other collectibles in the level are replaced by clocks, which will temporarily stop the timer if collected. If Pac-Man loses a life during the time trial, he must restart the level from the beginning.

The game features twenty-five levels. These include a tutorial level set in Pac-Man's home of Pac-Village, followed by six different themed areas with four levels each. The last level of each of these areas feature a boss battle with one or more of the primary ghost enemies, who must be defeated to advance. Certain levels feature unique gameplay mechanics. Some equip Pac-Man with ice skates or roller blades, impacting speed and movement. Others feature automatically scrolling levels set underwater, in which Pac-Man can swim to avoid obstacles or pilot a submarine equipped with torpedoes. Most levels feature one of 16 collectible Galaxian flagships, which will allow Pac-Man to play a bonus maze level, similar in gameplay to Pac-Man (1980). Non-boss levels also feature collectible arcade tokens; eight are hidden in each level, while bonus tokens can be earned by collecting all the fruit and Pac-Dots in a level and completing time trials. By collecting certain numbers of tokens, players can unlock emulated versions of older Pac-Man titles in the Pac-Village arcade, including Pac-Man, Pac-Attack (1993), Pac-Mania (1987), and Ms. Pac-Man (1982). Collecting tokens will also unlock a jukebox, which enables the player to listen to the game's soundtrack, and a concept art gallery.

The Game Boy Advance version of the game is considerably different from the other versions of the game. It plays from an isometric view, and uses 2D sprites for graphics and a password-based save system. The underwater stages were omitted from this version, while an additional boss was added. In addition, the emulated games are not included.

Subsequent re-releases of the game rebalanced the gameplay to tone down the game's difficulty. For the game's Japanese PlayStation 2 release, further changes were made to reduce difficulty, including shortening certain levels and reducing bosses' health.

== Story ==
Hundreds of years prior to the game's events, the powerful evil ghost Spooky terrorized Pac-Land and the Pac-People. To stop him, a Pac-Wizard created a potion that transformed five ordinary fruit into magical Golden Fruit. A Pac-Knight defeated Spooky in battle, and used the Golden Fruit to seal him under a tree in the center of Pac-Village.

In the present day, Blinky, Inky, Pinky and Clyde sneak into Pac-Village at night to cause mischief. They steal the Golden Fruit from the tree, unaware of its purpose, and unwittingly release Spooky, who commands them to aid his plan to eliminate all Pac-People. The ghosts agree and each take one of the Golden Fruit. The next morning, Professor Pac informs Pac-Man of the trouble and asks him to retrieve the stolen Golden Fruit in order to save Pac-Land. Pac-Man travels throughout Pac-Land and across the ocean to Ghost Island, defeating the ghosts and retrieving the Golden Fruit along the way. Pac-Man eventually returns to Pac-Village, where he is ambushed by Spooky. The power of the Golden Fruit transforms Pac-Man into a new golden form, and he defeats Spooky once more, sealing him back beneath the tree. The residents of Pac-Village emerge to congratulate Pac-Man, while his dog Chomp-Chomp spots the ghosts lurking nearby and chases them out of the village.

=== Re-Pac ===
In the Re-Pac remake, Spooky is not re-sealed, but fully destroyed by Pac-Man with the Golden Fruit's power. Following Spooky's defeat, Pac-Man's children Pac-Boy and Pac-Sis go missing. While looking for them, Pac-Man finds a hole in the Golden Fruit tree and falls through it, emerging back in time during Spooky's reign. Learning that his children also fell through and have been imprisoned, Pac-Man once again ventures across Pac-Land and Ghost Island in search of them, defeating Spooky's ghost minions. Returning to Pac-Village, Pac-Man defeats Spooky and uses the newly created Golden Fruit to seal him beneath the tree, creating a causal loop by making him the knight spoken of in the history books. Pac-Man frees his children and takes them back to the present.

Upon his return, Pac-Man receives a note calling him to an arena on Ghost Island. There, he is ambushed by Toc-Man, who demands revenge for an unspecified slight and attacks him. After the two battle, Toc-Man reveals that he was angry about not being invited to Pac-Man's birthday after they had previously become friends. (Note: As depicted in Pac-Man World Re-Pac (2022).) Pac-Man explains he did send Toc-Man an invitation, which Toc-Man realizes he accidentally used as toilet paper. Pac-Man forgives him for the misunderstanding and invites him to Pac-Village for a make-up party.

== Release ==
Pac-Man World 2 was released in February 2002 for PlayStation 2, March 2002 for GameCube, and October 2002 for Xbox. Versions for Windows and Game Boy Advance later released in 2004 and 2005 respectively.

The GameCube version was re-released in 2004 under Nintendo's Player's Choice label; this version included Pac-Man Vs. as a bonus pack-in in North America. In 2008, the PlayStation 2 version was repackaged in the Pac-Man Power Pack, a bundle also containing Pac-Man World 3 and Pac-Man World Rally.

== Reception ==
Reception

Aggregate score
Aggregator	Score
Metacritic	(PS2) 73/100 (GCN) 74/100 (XBOX) 66/100 (PC) 54/100

Review scores
Publication	Score
Eurogamer	5/10
GameSpot	8/10
IGN	7/10
Nintendo World Report	8/10

Next Generation ranked it as the 56th highest-selling game launched for the PlayStation 2, Xbox or GameCube between January 2000 and July 2006 in that country. Combined sales of Pac-Man World games released in the 2000s reached 1.8 million units in the United States by July 2006.

The GameCube version of Pac-Man World 2 has an average score of 73.83% on GameRankings. The PlayStation 2 and Xbox versions each have an average score of 68.18% and 67.69% respectively. The Game Boy Advance version has a score of 41.67%. The GameCube version became a Player's Choice title, the PlayStation 2 version became a Greatest Hits title and the Xbox version became a Platinum Hits title. The game also has a score of eight on GameSpot for the PS2 version, a 7.9 for the GameCube version, and a 7.5 for the Xbox version. The game's camera system received criticism, but the musical score was praised. NGC Magazine gave the game 70% rating giving praise to the level and boss designs although criticizing the poor camera system and the gameplay being similar to the Mario games. Pac-Man World 2 was nominated for GameSpot's annual "Best Platformer on Xbox" award, which went to Jet Set Radio Future.

== Remake ==
Pac-Man World 2 Re-Pac
- Developer: Now Production
- Publisher: Bandai Namco Entertainment
- Series: Pac-Man
- Platforms: Nintendo Switch; Nintendo Switch 2; PlayStation 4; PlayStation 5; Windows; Xbox One; Xbox Series X/S
- Release: September 26, 2025
- Genre: Platform
- Modes: Single-player, multiplayer

A remake of Pac-Man World 2, titled Pac-Man World 2 Re-Pac, was announced during a Nintendo Direct in July 2025. The remake was developed by Now Production, which also developed Pac-Man World Re-Pac (2022), and similarly remakes the game from the ground up with multiple changes.

=== Gameplay ===
Pac-Man's abilities in Re-Pac have been expanded, including the ability to perform the flip kick on the ground, and the flutter jump and Pac-Dot throw from the previous Re-Pac game. Stages have been remixed compared to the original, and all bosses have been updated or replaced with new ones. Each stage has additional missions, such as collecting all fruit or finishing a time trial in a certain time; completing all of a stage's missions unlocks bonuses such as new costumes for Pac-Man. Special figurines can be obtained in stages and from gashapon machines at the arcade, which can be displayed on pedestals in Pac-Village. While the classic games return, Ms. Pac-Man is no longer playable, presumably due to the ongoing dispute with AtGames over the IP. Completing the game unlocks a set of more difficult levels and bosses.

Re-Pac features two-player cooperative play, with the second player controlling a floating Pac-Drone that can attack foes and retrieve collectibles. An optional "Fairy Mode" difficulty setting makes players invincible and allows them to skip portions of a stage if they repeatedly get stuck. The remake also adds full voice acting, including Martin Sherman reprising his role as Pac-Man from Pac-Man World 3.

=== Release ===
Re-Pac was released on September 26, 2025, for the Nintendo Switch, Nintendo Switch 2, PlayStation 4, PlayStation 5, Xbox One, Xbox Series X and Series S and Microsoft Windows. Physical copies feature a reversible cover that recreates the original game's box art. A selection of the game's costumes and figures were automatically unlocked for those who preordered the game. A Toc-Man costume for Pac-Man is also unlocked if the game detects a Pac-Man World Re-Pac save file. The game is available in standard or deluxe editions; the latter grants access to a Pac-Land costume, as well as Sonic the Hedgehog-themed downloadable content released on November 11 that adds three stages, a costume, and 20 figures. The crossover content came as a result of Sega approaching Bandai Namco about including Pac-Man content in Sonic Racing: CrossWorlds (2025). A set of free holiday costumes was added to the game on December 23, 2025, while a birthday hat costume was added on May 22, 2026, to commemorate the 46th anniversary of the original arcade game.

=== Reception ===
Reception

Aggregate scores
Aggregator	Score
Metacritic	74/100 (PS5) (Note: Based on 24 reviews); 77/100 (NS2) (Note: Based on 9 reviews)
OpenCritic	65% recommend (Note: Based on 51 reviews)

Review scores
Publication	Score
Hardcore Gamer	7/10
HobbyConsolas	80%
Nintendo Life	7/10
Nintendo World Report	9/10
Push Square	6/10

Brett Posner-Ferdman of Push Square praised the game's added production value and new post-game content, but criticized the level design, calling it "dragging". Posner-Ferdman noted most major changes in the remake aim to extend the original's short five-hour runtime. John Rairdin of Nintendo World Report complimented the level design, improved boss fights, and overall amount of content.
