= Undead Knights =

2009 video game

- American box art
- Developers: Team Tachyon; Now Production
- Publisher: Tecmo
- Platform: PlayStation Portable
- Release: NA: September 29, 2009; JP: October 15, 2009; EU: February 26, 2010; AU: March 4, 2010
- Genres: Action-adventure, hack & slash
- Modes: Single-player, multiplayer

Undead Knights (アンデッドナイツ, Andeddo Naitsu) is an action-adventure video game developed by Team Tachyon and Now Production and published by Tecmo for the PlayStation Portable. It was released in North America and Japan in 2009 and in the PAL region in 2010.

== Gameplay ==
Undead Knights is an action-adventure game similar to God of War. The player's goal is to eliminate all enemies. The player can perform melee attacks, chain multiple attacks to make combos, and dispatch enemies in quick time events.

== Plot ==
The story follows three knights—Romulus Blood (Keith Ferguson), his younger brother Remus (Andrew Kashino), and Remus's wife Sylvia Gradis (Megan Hollingshead), princess of Cavalier—as they seek revenge against King Kirk Gladys (Steve Blum) and his wife Fatima (Wendy Braun) for slaughtering the House of Blood. Romulus is a human knight and former head of the House of Blood who made a Faustian bargain with an invisible demon known as The Beast (Steve Blum). The knights are revived as necromancers who can turn their enemies into undead soldiers.

The trio fights Duke Gloucester, a former war hero who became a corrupt glutton. He attempts to kill them with a demon but fails. The group discovers they have become more demonic as they bargain with The Beast.

While fighting the individuals responsible for their deaths, the warriors discover the Holy Tree, whose fruits turn its consumers into demons. Captain Gerard, a leader of knights aligned with Fatima, uses the fruit after discovering his daughter was killed in a battle with the Undead Knights and becomes a giant demon named Nephilim. Before dying, Gerard reveals Fatima controls a faction of undead servants and has forsaken Cavalier for her own goals.

The undead knights encounter genetically engineered soldiers called Ouroboros created by the mad, selfish wizard Lord Follis (Liam O'Brien). He unsuccessfully attempts to convince the warriors to join forces, and a battle ensues. Follis uses the fruit of the Holy Tree to mutate into a demon known as Venom Angel but is slain by the knights.

After the battle, Fatima's younger brother, Jester (Thomas Brownhead), reveals Romulus inadvertently killed Sylvia and Remus in a rampage after they were captured by Kirk's knights. Sylvia and Remus forgive Romulus and the group slays Jester who reveals himself to be a product of Fatima's experiments. Kirk Gladys becomes horrified by the powers Fatima gave him and regrets betraying the House of Blood before the trio destroys him.

In the finale, Fatima's rise to power and the powers she shared is unveiled. Fatima was once a human who made a pact with The Beast in a demonic realm called The Void. The power The Beast gave them was not magic but an infection from The Beast's blood. Fatima also reveals she created the Holy Tree from The Beast's blood to rid humanity's fear of death and develop her ideal world where humans are undead and immortal. When the knights oppose her, Fatima fuses herself with the tree and becomes a demon called Yggdrasil, but they kill her.

In her last moments, Fatima offers a crystallized stone made of demon blood to protect the warriors from The Beast, fearing they would be hunted. The trio realizes The Beast was exploiting them as assassins. The Beast asserts the knights are beyond redemption, leading them to destroy the crystal to defy The Beast keeping them as slaves. The Beast furiously warns them that they will die again and go to hell, promising to "keep a spot nice and warm for (them)." In the game's epilogue, the trio admits that they will serve the punishment for their sins in vengeance as "undead knights".

== Release ==
On October 1, 2009, the Undead Knights demo was mistakenly replaced with the full game on the PlayStation Store, allowing consumers to download the full game for free.

== Reception ==
Reception

Aggregate score
Aggregator	Score
Metacritic	63/100

Review scores
Publication	Score
Destructoid	8.5/10
Edge	4/10
Famitsu	31/40
GameSpot	5.5/10
GamesRadar+	4/5
GameTrailers	5.6/10
GameZone	6.3/10
IGN	5.8/10
Jeuxvideo.com	12/20
MeriStation	6.5/10
PlayStation: The Official Magazine	3/5
The Guardian	3/5

The game received "mixed" reviews according to the review aggregation website Metacritic. In Japan, however, Famitsu gave it a score of three eights and one seven for a total of 31 out of 40.

Reviewers expressed extreme opinions about the most controversial elements of the game. Some scorned the inconsistencies with the decorum of the genre and condemned the mixture of its heavy metal soundtrack as well as its vulgar language incongruous with the game's fantasy medieval environment. Others praised the game and its story for evoking cathartic experiences.
