= Pac-Man (character) =

Video game character

- Pac-Man character
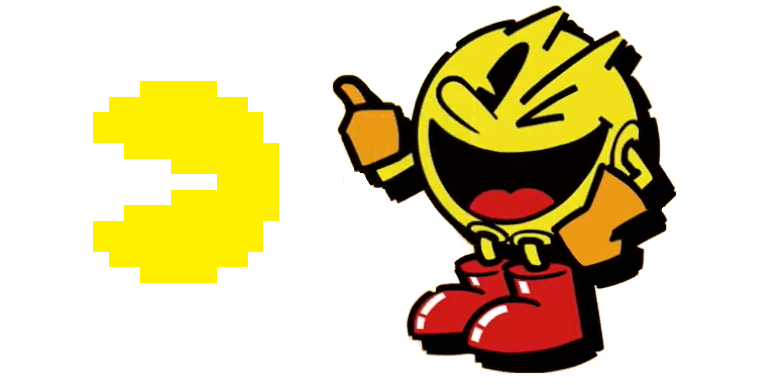
- Pac-Man as he appears in the original Pac-Man (1980) (left) and promotional material (right)
- First appearance: Pac-Man (1980)
- Created by: Toru Iwatani
- Designed by: Toru Iwatani; Tadashi Yamashita
- Voiced by: Various: Marty Ingels (1982 TV series) Pat McBride (Kid Stuff Records records) Duncan MacLaren (Pac-Man: Adventures in Time) Martin Sherman (Pac-Man World 3, Pac-Man World 2 Re-Pac) Debi Derryberry (Street Fighter X Tekken, Pac-Man Party) Erin Mathews (Ghostly Adventures series) Erica Mendez (Ghostly Adventures games) Yuka Terasaki (Ghostly Adventures series, Japan) Emily Swallow (Secret Level) Mike Cefalo (Pac-Man: Snack Breaks)

In-universe information
- Spouse: Ms. Pac-Man

Pac-Man (Note: Japanese: パックマン, Hepburn: Pakkuman) is a fictional character and the titular protagonist of Bandai Namco Entertainment's multi-media franchise Pac-Man. Created by Toru Iwatani, he first appeared in the arcade game Pac-Man (1980), and has since appeared in more than 30 licensed sequels and spin-offs for multiple platforms, and spawning mass amounts of merchandise in his image, including two television series and a hit single by Buckner & Garcia. He is the official mascot of Bandai Namco Entertainment. Pac-Man's most common antagonists are the Ghost Gang — Blinky, Pinky, Inky and Clyde that are determined to defeat him to accomplish their goals, which change throughout the series. Pac-Man also has a voracious appetite, being able to consume vast amounts of food in a short timespan, and can eat his enemies by consuming large "Power Pellets".

The idea of Pac-Man was taken from both the image of a pizza with a slice removed and from rounding out the Japanese symbol 口 (kuchi, lit. "mouth"). The character was made to be cute and colorful to appeal to younger players, particularly women. The title was derived from the Japanese phrase paku paku taberu, which refers to gobbling something up. The title was changed in international releases to avoid it sounding too similar to an expletive (the Japanese pronunciation of paku being similar to 'pucku') and due to fear of arcade cabinets being vandalized by altering the P in 'Puck-Man' to an F.

Pac-Man has the highest-brand awareness of any video game character in North America, becoming an icon in video games and pop culture. He is credited as the first video game mascot character and the first to receive merchandise. He also appears as a playable guest character in some other games, most notably in the Super Smash Bros. series (specifically in the fourth and fifth installments) and in the Ridge Racer series.

== Concept and design ==
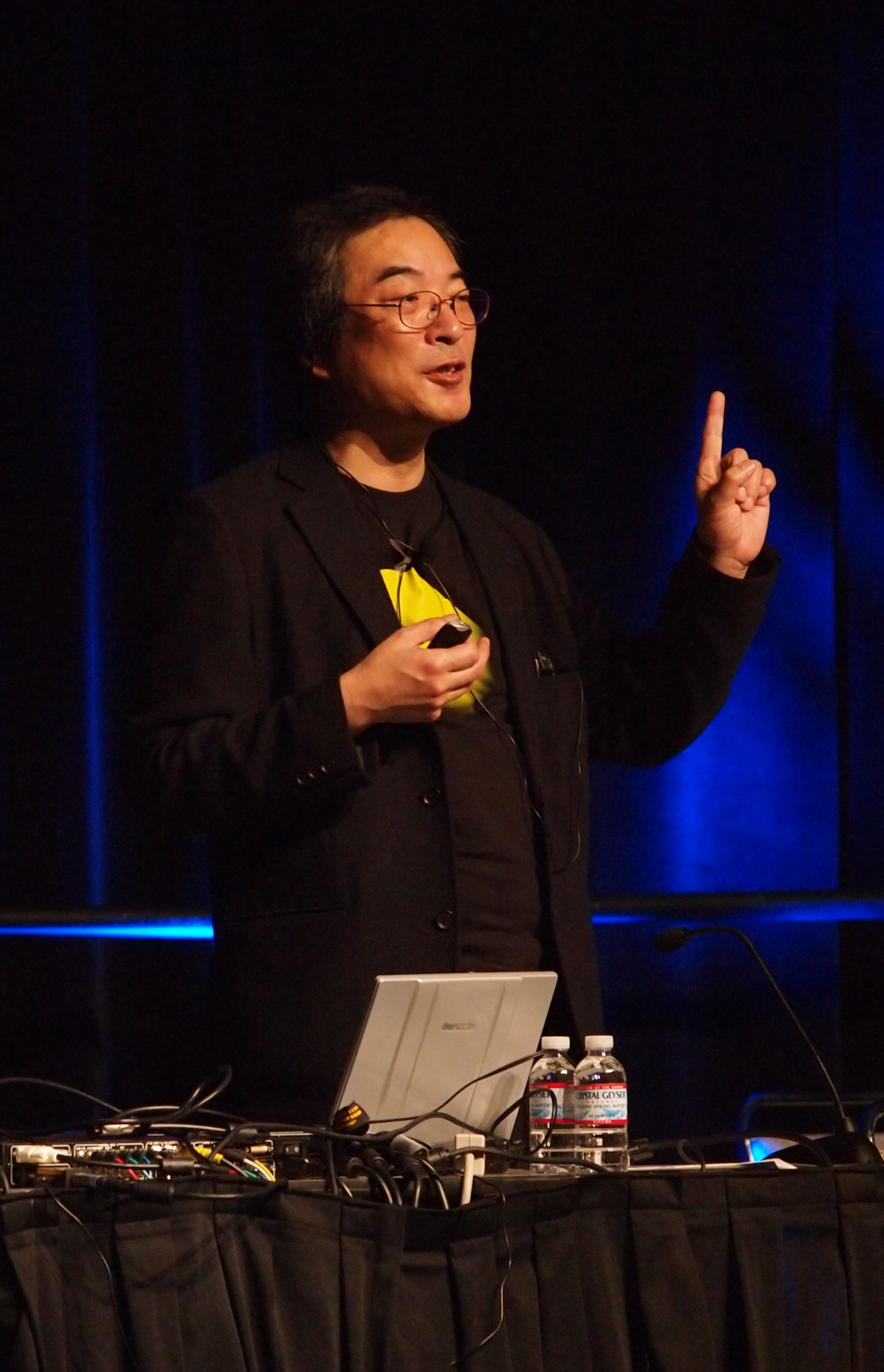
Tōru Iwatani, the creator of Pac-Man, in 2011

Pac-Man's origins are debated. According to the character's creator Toru Iwatani, the inspiration was pizza without a slice, which gave him a vision of "an animated pizza, racing through a maze and eating things with its absent-slice mouth". However, he said in a 1986 interview that the design of the character also came from simplifying and rounding out the Japanese character for a mouth, kuchi (口). Another belief is that Pac-Man's simple design was a result of hardware limitations. The character's name comes from paku-paku (パクパク), an onomatopoeic Japanese word for gobbling something up. The character's name was written in English as "Puck-Man", but when Namco localized the game for the United States they changed it to "Pac-Man", fearing that vandals would change the P in "Puck" to an F (as in fuck).

When the game was being developed, Iwatani wanted all of its characters to be likable, with the decision to make Pac-Man yellow being a result of Iwatani believing the color represented neither an enemy or a hero. When the game was nearing completion, Iwatani presented the character to Namco artist Tadashi Yamashita, who added a large mouth, arms, and legs to the character. He also added eyes, which are enlarged versions of Pac-Man's basic circular design. A later game in the Pac-Man series, Pac-Land (1984), used this design as his in-game appearance, while also giving him a large nose.

== Appearances ==
Pac-Man is the main character of the Pac-Man franchise, first appearing in the original Pac-Man game in 1980. Also introduced in that game were the ghosts Blinky, Inky, Pinky, and Clyde, which serve as his predominant nemeses. Later in 1981, Ms. Pac-Man was introduced through the release of the Ms. Pac-Man arcade game, with the character later being established as Pac-Man's significant other. Other members of Pac-Man's family were introduced throughout the series, including their child Baby Pac-Man.

=== In video games ===
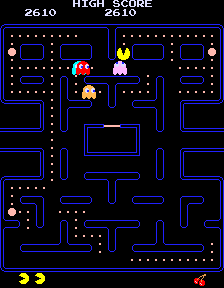
A gameplay screenshot of the original Pac-Man game, released in 1980

Despite Pac-Man's legacy, Pac-Man himself did not appear again until the 1982 arcade release of Super Pac-Man, which introduced a change into Super Pac-Man (Pac-Man increased in size and invulnerability). Later arcade games included Pac-Land, Pac-Mania and Pac-Man Arrangement, a remake of the original Pac-Man. Pac-Man World was released in 1999 on the PlayStation, and introduced new abilities to him (reminiscent of Mario's and Sonic the Hedgehog's abilities). The game contributed heavily to the series as well as the character and spawned two sequels, a spin-off, and a remake as well. Pac-Man World 2 features Pac-Man on an adventure to rescue Pac-Land from an ancient spirit known as Spooky. Pac-Man World 3 was released in 2005 to celebrate Pac-Man's 25th anniversary. In Pac 'n Roll, a young Pac-Man is being trained by the great Pac-Master.

Several spin-offs have been released, such as a racing game called Pac-Man World Rally. Midway Games established a spin-off titled Ms. Pac-Man (featuring Pac-Man's wife of the same name), which was created without Namco's consent. Pac-Man appears in Street Fighter X Tekken as a playable guest fighter, riding a giant Mokujin robot, and in Everybody's Golf 6 as a playable guest golfer (through DLC). Pac-Man has appeared in Mario Kart Arcade GP installments as a playable racer, as well as in the Ridge Racer series.

Pac-Man is also a playable character in Super Smash Bros. for Nintendo 3DS and Wii U, co-developed by Sora Ltd. and Bandai Namco Games. Sporting his classic design used in artwork for the original game and in the Pac-Man World games, Pac-Man's moveset is based around early Pac-Man games and various other Namco arcade titles, such as deploying a Power Pellet and dashing after it, summoning fire hydrants from Pac-Land, or jumping on the trampoline from Mappy. An Amiibo figure based on his appearance also allows Pac-Man elements to appear in compatible Nintendo titles, such as Mario Kart 8 and Super Mario Maker. Pac-Man returns as a playable character in Super Smash Bros. Ultimate.

=== Other appearances and designs ===
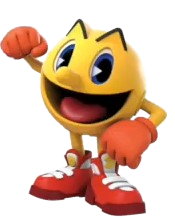
Pac-Man as he appears in Pac-Man and the Ghostly Adventures

Outside of video games and other media, Pac-Man serves as the official mascot of Bandai Namco Entertainment.

In 1982, the first Pac-Man cartoon premiered and ran until 1983. The series revolved around Pac-Man (voiced by Marty Ingels) and his family's frequent encounters with the Ghost Gang. It was the first animated series to be based on a video game. In 2013, the animated series Pac-Man and the Ghostly Adventures was released, intended to serve as a reboot of the Pac-Man franchise. With the reboot, Pac-Man received a visual redesign that depicts him as a young teenager. Several new characters were also created for the series that replaced Pac-Man's friends and family from the rest of the series. Following the release of the show, several tie-in games were released, including the Pac-Man and the Ghostly Adventures video game and its 2014 sequel. The series ran for two seasons from 2013 to 2015.

Pac-Man played a significant role in Pixels (2015), a movie where aliens take the form of video game characters and invade Earth. He is also prominently featured in the movie's promotional material. In the movie, Pac-Man goes rampant through New York, as well as biting off the hand of his creator Iwatani (played by Denis Akiyama) after he attempts to stop Pac-Man's rampage. He is ultimately defeated by the movie’s characters through the usage of cars that function as the equivalent to the ghosts. He has also made guest appearances in other television series and movies, including Wreck-It Ralph (2012) and its sequel, Ralph Breaks the Internet (2018), South Park (specifically in "Imaginationland Episode III"), and Guardians of the Galaxy Vol. 2 (2017). In August 2022, it was announced that a live-action Pac-Man film was being developed by Wayfarer Studios.

In December 2024, Pac-Man was adapted in video game anthology series, Secret Level, created by Tim Miller, for release on Amazon Prime Video, The episode was called "PAC-MAN: Circle", and the Pac-Man character—depicted as Puck, a robot trapped in a "maze"—was voiced by Emily Swallow. Puck later reappears in Shadow Labyrinth (2025), which served as a re-imagining of the Pac-Man franchise.

== Reception and legacy ==
Since the release of Pac-Man in 1980, the character of Pac-Man has become a social phenomenon as well as a video game and pop culture icon. He has also been noted to be one of the first video game characters ever created. The character has been included on several lists for the greatest, most iconic, or most influential video game characters of all time. These lists include those from the staff teams of The Independent, Tom's Guide, Time, HobbyConsolas, Empire, GamesRadar+, and reader polls from the Guinness World Records and BAFTA, which had over 13,000 and 4,000 voters respectively. According to the Davie-Brown Index (DBI), Pac-Man has the highest brand awareness of any video game character among American consumers, recognized by 94 percent of them, with Mario being in second place at 93 percent.

Several journalists have pointed out a distinctive lack of characterization with Pac-Man beyond his simple design, though still being popular nonetheless. Alex Wade wrote that Pac-Man in his original form is "instantly recognizable to gamers and non-gamers", despite being no more than what he viewed as a superficial character, "effectively no more than an automaton" that relied completely on the player for actions and featured no other unique characteristics. James Newman was indifferent, and wrote that the popularity of the character could have been despite his simple design, or because of his simple design. The Independent's James McMahon described the popularity of Pac-Man's basic design to as "remarkable." Empire's Willow Green wrote that Pac-Man was the "definitive symbol" of the video game medium, comparable in levels of widespread cultural recognition as Darth Vader from Star Wars, and the editorial team of Tom's Guide described him as "timeless" and "universally recognizable," to a point where any lore the character could've had was irrelevant. Several have noted Pac-Man's simple design to appeal to both men and women.

GamingBolt's Ravi Sinha criticized Pac-Man's appearance in Pac-Land, which strayed away from the simple design depicted in the original arcade and added elements to the character that Sinha viewed negatively, stating that "of all the characters that needed a redesign, Pac-Man should not have even been considered." Similarly, when writing about the character in a ranking of fighters present in Super Smash Bros. Ultimate, Gavin Jasper of Den of Geek wrote that Pac-Man was not a character that needed anything beyond his original design, and that he was not supposed to be an "actual character." He described any attempts to make Pac-Man anything more than that design, from both a design and story perspective, to "too strange to exist" and that the character "breaks reality."

In an entry from the 2017 publication 100 Greatest Video Game Characters, Jessica A. Robinson explained that Pac-Man changed how the video game industry designed characters, and how he differentiated from characters created prior such as those from Space Invaders, which were typically just images of spaceships or paddles. She stated that, while player identification with those characters was possible, Pac-Man and his easily recognizable design was a "different experience," writing that "players wanted to proceed to the next level and earn a high score, while Pac-Man himself wanted to survive his encounters with the ghosts." As characters such as Ms. Pac-Man were introduced later on, Robinson noted this to anthropomorphize the character further for players. Pac-Man's easily recognizable design, as well as the ability for the player to identify with him, led many game developers from that point on to create their own characters that would be easily recognizable.

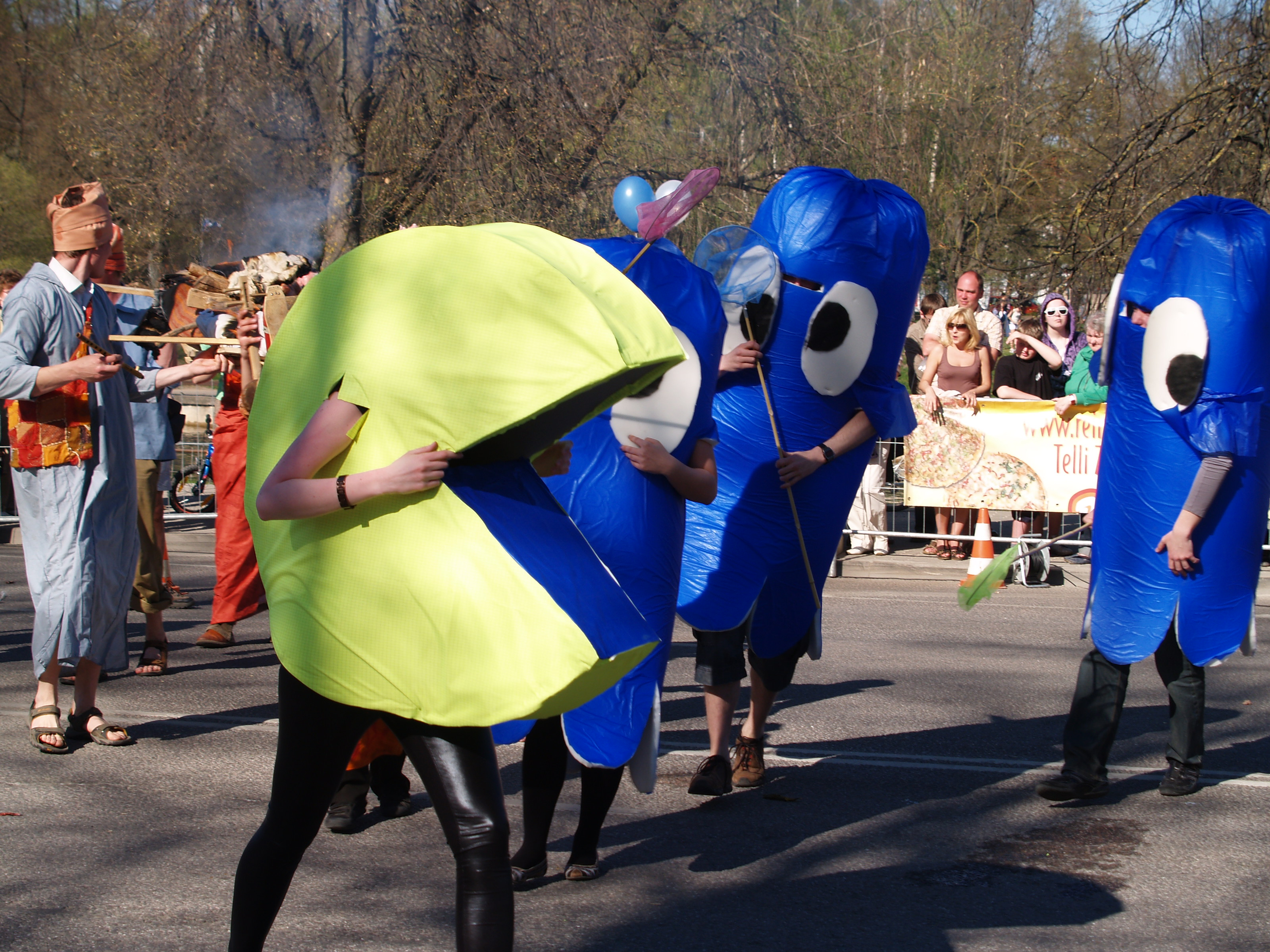
Runners in Pac-Man costumes at Students' Spring Days in Tartu, Estonia

Jaakko Suominen and Saara Ala-Luopa wrote that Pac-Man was a "root icon" in video games alongside the enemies from Space Invaders, as well as a leading example of the "retro-gaming economy," which revolves around nostalgia from those who were either around to experience the time period, as well as those who simply enjoy the products and themes of the time period (an idea they referred to as "armchair nostalgia"). They highlighted this with the numerous pieces of official and unofficial merchandise of the character's original design, as well as graffiti designs of the character present throughout the world and "adaptations" of the Pac-Man game that were posted onto YouTube, typically demonstrating Pac-Man and the Ghosts chasing each-other in bizarre locations such as a golf course. They also believed that videos and adaptations depicting Pac-Man as a figure were more popular than those that demonstrated him as a playable character. Retro Gamer staff regarded him as one of the greatest video game icons, finding him among the most recognizable due to how simplistic his design was and being an early example of a visually identifiable protagonist.

The term "Pac-Man defense" in mergers and acquisitions refers to a hostile takeover target that attempts to reverse the situation and take over its would-be acquirer instead, a reference to the power pellets present in the Pac-Man game. Filipino boxer Manny Pacquiao was nicknamed "Pac-Man", as was American football player Adam Jones. The character is also the unofficial namesake of a region in the Cassiopeia constellation, specifically NGC 281, due to similarities between the region and the design of the character.
