= Wagyan Land =

1989 video game

- Family Computer version box art
- Developer: Now Production
- Publisher: Namco
- Composer: Yoshie Arakawa
- Series: Wagyan
- Platforms: Family Computer, Game Gear
- Release: JP: February 9, 1989
- Genre: Platform
- Mode: Single-player

Wagyan Land (Note: Japanese: ワギャンランド, Hepburn: Wagyan Rando) is a 1989 platform video game developed by Now Production and published for the Family Computer by Namco. A port for the Game Gear was released in 1991. The game is based on the 1987 arcade game Wagyan. A sequel, Wagyan Land 2, was released in 1990.

== Gameplay ==
Wagan shoots sound wave projectiles at enemies.

The player character, Wagyan, has the ability to temporarily stun his enemies with sound waves shaped like the noises "Wah" (ワッ) and "Gyah" (ギャー, Gyā). Enemies cannot be destroyed with Wagyan's sound waves, but the player can stand over one while it is stunned. When the player picks up a Wagyanizer, the sound effects shot by Wagyan will become bigger with each increment, allowing the player to stun enemies for longer periods. When a four Wagyanizers are collected, Wagyan will become invincible for a limited period, increasing his walking speed and allowing him to defeat enemies by touching them. However, Wagyan will revert to his initial sound effect attack once the invincibility effect wears off. There is no energy gauge in; if the player touches an enemy or falls into a trap, one life is lost.

The objective of the game is to reach the end of each action scene by making the best use of Wagyan's sound wave attacks and jumping ability. The player must confront a boss at the end of certain stages, but instead of actually fighting the boss in battle, the player is challenged to a mini-game where they must score more points than their opponent.

== Release ==
Wagyan Land was included in the compilation Namcot Collection.

== Reception ==
Reception

Review scores
Publication	Score
Computer and Video Games	92/100
Famitsu	27/40
Mean Machines Sega	85%
Sega Zone	89/100

== Sequels ==
The game spawned several sequels:

- Wagyan Land 2 (1990, Famicom)
- Super Wagyan Land (1991, Super Famicom)
- Wagyan Land 3 (1992, Famicom)
- Super Wagyan Land 2 (1993, Super Famicom)
- Wagyan Paradise (1994, Super Famicom)
- Hirameki Action: Chibikko Wagyan no Ōkina Bōken (2009, Nintendo DS)
