= WTA Tour Tennis =

2001 video game

- North American PS2 cover art with Jelena Dokic
- Developers: Konami; Now Production (GBA)
- Publisher: Konami
- Platforms: PlayStation 2, Game Boy Advance, GameCube, Xbox
- Release: September 27, 2001: PlayStation 2; JP: September 27, 2001; NA: March 26, 2002; PAL: September 13, 2002 Game Boy Advance; JP: February 14, 2002; NA: May 31, 2002; PAL: June 21, 2002 GameCube, Xbox; JP: August 29, 2002; PAL: September 13, 2002; NA: September 24, 2002
- Genre: Sports
- Modes: Single-player, multiplayer

WTA Tour Tennis (WTA ツアーテニス, WTA Tsuā Tenisu), known in Japan as WTA Tour Tennis Pocket (WTA ツアーテニス ポケット, WTA Tsuā Tenisu Poketto) for Game Boy Advance, and WTA Tour Tennis Pro Evolution (WTA ツアーテニス プロ エボリューション, WTA Tsuā Tenisu Puro Eboryūshon) for GameCube and Xbox, and in Europe as Pro Tennis WTA Tour, is a tennis video game published and developed by Konami in 2001-2002.

== Reception ==
Reception

Aggregate score
Aggregator	Score			
Aggregator	GBA	GameCube	PS2	Xbox
Metacritic	66/100	55/100	50/100	49/100

Review scores
Publication	Score			
Publication	GBA	GameCube	PS2	Xbox
AllGame	N/A	N/A	2.5/5	N/A
Famitsu	25/40	26/40	25/40	26/40
Game Informer	7.75/10	N/A	5/10	N/A
GameSpot	6.6/10	6.6/10	6.9/10	6.6/10
GameSpy	55%	N/A	70%	N/A
IGN	5.8/10	4/10	4.5/10	4/10
Nintendo Power	3.5/5	3.3/5	N/A	N/A
Nintendo World Report	7/10	N/A	N/A	N/A
Official U.S. PlayStation Magazine	N/A	N/A	1/5	N/A
Official Xbox Magazine (UK)	N/A	N/A	N/A	1.5/10

The game received "mixed or average reviews" on all platforms except the Xbox version, which received "generally unfavorable reviews", according to the review aggregation website Metacritic. In Japan, Famitsu gave it a score of 26 out of 40 for the Pro Evolution versions, and 25 out of 40 for the original and Pocket versions.
