= Pac-Man World =

1999 video game

- North American PlayStation box art
- Developer: Namco Hometek (Note: The Game Boy Advance version was developed by Full Fat.)
- Publishers: Namco Hometek: JP: Namco; EU: Sony Computer Entertainment (PS); EU: Zoo Digital Publishing (GBA)
- Producer: Brian Schorr
- Designer: Scott Rogers
- Programmers: Gil Colgate; Joey Headen; Brian Leake; Roman Scharnberg
- Composer: Todd Dennis
- Series: Pac-Man
- Platforms: PlayStation, Game Boy Advance
- Release: PlayStation: NA: October 15, 1999; JP: November 2, 1999; EU: February 28, 2000; Game Boy Advance: NA: November 16, 2004; EU: November 26, 2004
- Genre: Platform
- Mode: Single-player

Pac-Man World (Note: Japanese: パックマンワールド 20thアニバーサリー, Hepburn: Pakkuman Wārudo 20th Anibāsarī) is a 1999 platform game developed and published by Namco Hometek for the PlayStation. Controlling Pac-Man, the player must complete each of the game's six worlds by collecting keys to free his captive family members, and reaching the end of each stage. The plot follows Pac-Man on a journey to Ghost Island, where his family is being held hostage by someone claiming to be the real Pac-Man.

The game originally began as an open-world adventure game titled Pac-Man Ghost Zone, with development headed by director Bill Anderson and designer Scott Rogers. After being unhappy with the game's quality, Namco scrapped the game and fired nearly the entire team aside from Rogers and a few others. The development team focused on making the game live up to the "flavor and feel" of the original Pac-Man, and to successfully bring the character into an enjoyable 3D adventure game.

Pac-Man World was a critical and commercial success, selling 1.5 million copies worldwide. Reviewers praised the game's originality, colorful graphics, gameplay mechanics, and soundtrack, although some criticized the gameplay for being repetitive due to its constant use of backtracking. A Game Boy Advance version was developed by Full Fat and released in 2004, while the PlayStation version was digitally re-released for the PlayStation Network in 2013 under the PSone Classics brand. It was followed by two sequels, Pac-Man World 2 (2002) and Pac-Man World 3 (2005), and a racing spin-off, Pac-Man World Rally (2006). A remake developed by Now Production and published by Bandai Namco Entertainment, titled Pac-Man World Re-Pac, was released in August 2022.

== Gameplay ==
In-game screenshot taken from the game's first level, Buccaneer Beach. The player's health and amount of pellets collected are respectively shown at the top left and top right.

Pac-Man World is a 3D platform video game. Controlling Pac-Man, the player must complete each of the game's six worlds to rescue his family and friends, who are held captive by the ghosts in their homeland of Ghost Island. Worlds consist of four levels each (except the Ruins world, which has three), which are completed by reaching the end of each level, sometimes requiring special doors and pathways to be opened along the way. The final level of each world has a boss that Pac-Man must defeat in order to progress. At the beginning of the game, only three worlds are available, while the other three are unlocked by completing all prior worlds. The six worlds in the game each feature distinctive themes, e.g. the first world, Pirate, features ships, cannons, and beaches.

Levels contain fruit that can be eaten for bonus points, alongside letters that spell out "PACMAN". Collecting all of these letters in a level will unlock a secret bonus stage. Some levels require Pac-Man to retrieve a key to rescue one of his captive friends. All family members must be rescued from each world before the final boss door containing Toc-Man can be opened.

Galaxian flagships found in certain levels allow Pac-Man to access a 3D maze themed after the world he is in. These mazes play similarly to the original Pac-Man and Ms. Pac-Man, where Pac-Man will need to eat all the dots and avoid the ghosts. Completing these mazes will unlock them for replay from the main menu, and completing all 36 mazes in the game's marathon mode will unlock the Pac-Gallery, where players can view concept art for the game. Most levels also contain Pac-Man's nemeses, the ghost gang, which can be defeated by consuming large Power Pellets and eating them.

Pac-Man has two main moves, which can be used to defeat enemies and other objects: a butt-bounce that can shatter crates and crush enemies, and a rev-roll that allows him to propel up ramps or activate moving platforms. Pac-Man has a health meter that allows him to sustain three hits before dying. He can find small fractions of health to replenish it in levels, as well as extra lives. The player can find crates scattered around in levels, some of them giving Pac-Man access to new abilities, such as a metal suit allowing him to walk underwater. Pac-Man can also interact with objects such as trampolines, doors and ramps, which can be used to solve puzzles to progress through the level. At the main menu, the player can play a port of the original Pac-Man arcade game, which is the same version found in Namco Museum Vol. 1.

== Development ==
Pac-Man World began as a prototype platform game for the PlayStation, titled Pac-Man Ghost Zone, which was only shown at the Electronic Entertainment Expo in 1997 and intended for released in the fall of that same year. Headed by Namco Hometek director Bill Anderson, the game followed a teenager being sucked into a Pac-Man arcade cabinet by the ghosts and their leader the Ghost Lord, and transforming into Pac-Man. The game was made to break the mold of previous Pac-Man games, such as having a grittier look. Namco's Japanese division put pressure on the project with strict guidelines — Anderson recalls being unable to use a 3D render of the character as a reference, requiring the team to make it themselves. Development was assisted by designer Scott Rogers, with music composed by Tommy Tallarico. When the prototype was presented to Namco, they became unhappy with it and cancelled it for quality reasons, firing the entire development team aside from Rogers, an artist and a programmer. Namco also pushed the release date back to 1998 to allow the game to be reworked. The team decided to revamp the project with a new gameplay engine.

Rogers, who had previously worked on localization for Namco's own Soul Edge and Xevious 3D/G, became the head designer of the project and created many of the enemies and stage layouts. The team set out to retain the "flavor and feel" of the original Pac-Man, and to bring the character into an entertaining platform game. Inspiration was taken from earlier platform games in the series, notably Pac-Land (1984) and Pac-In-Time (1995). During development, Rogers noted that trying to live up to the game's source material put a large amount of pressure on the team, claiming that most players were only familiar with the original Pac-Man and Ms. Pac-Man with no memories for later games in the series, which left the team having to make the game appeal to players of those two games. The game originally featured cameos from other Namco characters, including Taizo Hori from Dig Dug and Valkyrie from Valkyrie no Densetsu; however, these were replaced with members of Pac-Man's family in the final version — a Pooka from Dig Dug was later added into the game due to the character's popularity in Japan. The game's main antagonist, Toc-Man, is named after Namcot, the older Japanese home console division of Namco.

Pac-Man wasn't given a voice in the game due to Namco being unable to decide what he should sound like — some suggested that he sound like an adult male and others like a human child. To save money on voice acting and animation, the character was left largely unvoiced with no lines spoken. Tommy Tallarico's studio was hired back for the game's audio, with Joey Kuras being responsible for the sound design and Todd Dennis composing the music. The game was first shown at the 1998 Electronic Entertainment Expo (E3) tradeshow in Atlanta, Georgia, under the working title Pac-Man 3-D. Rogers recalls it being a popular title, saying that many play testers shared with him their memories with Pac-Man series. It was then shown off at E3 1999 under the final title of Pac-Man World: 20th Anniversary. The game was released in North America on October 15, 1999, to coincide with the original release of Pac-Man in the United States. The advertisements notably featured Mr. T and Verne Troyer as neighbors in Beverly Hills who are shocked to see Pac-Man move into and renovate the house across the street from them. It was later released in Japan on November 2, 1999 and in Europe on February 28, 2000. A Game Boy Advance version was developed by Full Fat and released in 2004. The PlayStation version was digitally re-released on the PlayStation Network in 2013, part of the PSone Classics brand.

== Reception ==
Reception

Aggregate score
Aggregator	Score
GameRankings	81%

Review scores
Publication	Score
AllGame	4.5/5
Computer and Video Games	3/5
GameFan	87/100
GameSpot	7.6/10
IGN	7.8/10
Official U.S. PlayStation Magazine	4.5/5
Atari HQ	9/10
The Ledger	5/5

Pac-Man World was well received by critics for its gameplay, soundtrack, graphics and originality, holding an 81% score on aggregator website GameRankings though the GBA version held a score of 59.00%. By 2007, the game had sold over 1.24 million copies in North America alone. Worldwide, the game sold 1.5 million units.

GameSpot compared the game favorably to Namco's own Klonoa: Door to Phantomile, praising its colorful graphics, character animations and controls, concluding that it was "worthy of anyone's library". IGN had a similar response, liking the game's originality, graphics and soundtrack — they especially praised its gameplay for standing out among other platform games, with its puzzle solving and animation style.

GameFan praised its gameplay, puzzle-solving mechanics and inclusion of the original Pac-Man, while Official US PlayStation Magazine applauded its gameplay, vibrant graphics, challenge and boss fights, saying that the game's use of nostalgia doesn't feel forced on the player. GameFan also wrote that the game "perfectly mimics those old 8-bit and 16-bit platformers we used to go nuts over", comparing the game's quality favorably to Klonoa: Door to Phantomile. Atari HQ liked how the game tied in a platform game with mechanics from the original, highly praising its gameplay and originality.

Game Revolution was particularly negative towards the game, saying that it simply existed as a marketing ploy to scoop up additional money from the name recognition. They criticized the game for lacking originality, particularly comparing it unfavorably to Donkey Kong Country and Crash Bandicoot, as well as for having an unbalanced difficulty level and "quick, corner-cutting development". They only recommended the game to hardcore Pac-Man fans, although mockingly commented that they "probably bought [it] already."

== Remake ==
Pac-Man World Re-Pac
- Developer: Now Production
- Publisher: Bandai Namco Entertainment
- Director: Syuhou Imai
- Producers: Minami Honda; Yuji Yoshii
- Designers: Yusaku Nakagawa; Suzuka Konno; Fumiko Nishimura
- Programmers: Hayato Sakurai; Seiya Yoshida; Yuto Ogaki
- Artists: Yukiya Matsuura; Satoshi Nishikawa; Suzuka Imamura
- Series: Pac-Man
- Engine: Unity
- Platforms: Nintendo Switch; PlayStation 4; PlayStation 5; Windows; Xbox One; Xbox Series X/S
- Release: August 26, 2022
- Genre: Platform
- Mode: Single-player

A remake of Pac-Man World, titled Pac-Man World Re-Pac, was announced through a Nintendo Direct in June 2022. Developed by Now Production, using the Unity engine, the game recreates the game from the ground up. The remake was released on Nintendo Switch, PlayStation 4, PlayStation 5, Xbox One, Xbox Series X/S, and PC via Steam on August 26 the same year. Unlike prior releases in this console generation (Katamari, Mr. Driller, Klonoa), it is not a part of Namco's "Encore" series of 3D franchise remakes.

Pac-Man World Re-Pac features several alterations to the game, ranging from visual overhauls to several worlds and alterations to gameplay. Various stages have been altered from the original, as well as boss battles being overhauled and new enemies being added. The remake also introduces several new techniques for Pac-Man, such as being able to destroy the level objects after eating a Power Pellet, and Pac-Man being able to hover in the air.

Production on the remake began in 2020 in conjunction with Pac-Man Museum+, and was largely influenced by fans of the game asking for a remake for years. Production focused on updating the game presentation while also leaving core aspects intact. Several members of Pac-Man's family have been replaced; Ms. Pac-Man, Pac-Man Junior and Baby Pac-Man were replaced by the similar Pac-Mom, Pac-Boy and Pac-Sis respectively, similarly to previous Pac-Man re-releases including Pac-Man Museum+. Bandai Namco has not officially stated reasons for the replacement of the characters, though news outlets have assumed the changes are tied to Ms. Pac-Man's ongoing AtGames dispute.

The initial release for the game did not feature credits from the original game's development staff, which the original Pac-Man World game designer Scott Rogers found disappointing and received criticism from fans. An update released on November 16, 2022, added the original team's credits to the credits, which later received praise from Scott Rogers. As part of the same update, paid DLC was released for the game that gives Metal Pac-Man a special skin and unlocks a jukebox to listen to the game's music.

Pac-Man World Re-Pac received favorable reviews for its gameplay and visual improvements, but was criticized for its lack of innovation. A Re-Pac remake of Pac-Man World 2 by the same development team followed in 2025.
