= Jackie Chan's Action Kung Fu =

1990 video game

- North American NES box art
- Developer: Now Production
- Publisher: Hudson Soft
- Composer: Masakatsu Maekawa
- Platforms: NES, TurboGrafx-16
- Release: NES: NA: December 1990; JP: January 25, 1991; EU: 1991; TurboGrafx-16: JP: January 18, 1991; NA: 1992
- Genres: Action, platform
- Mode: Single-player

Jackie Chan's Action Kung Fu (ジャッキー・チェン, Jakkī Chen; Jackie Chan) is an action-platform video game developed by Now Production and published by Hudson Soft. It was released for the Nintendo Entertainment System in 1990 and for the TurboGrafx-16 in 1991.

== Gameplay ==
The player controls Jackie Chan, the well-known martial arts stunt master, and brawls against many enemies during his quest to save his sister. The game is played through five levels (each with a boss at the end).

Throughout the game, the player would encounter frogs that carry power-ups or rice bowls (which are items in the game that restore health), but the frogs would have to be hit in order for the item to be obtained. Power-ups can allow the player to do a special type of attack over a limited number of times (although the player is only able to carry one power-up). Jackie is also able to charge a special beam-like attack, although it can only be used up to five times. Most of the enemies that the player defeats will drop green orbs, but enemies killed by beam attacks will not drop any orbs. If the player collects 30 orbs, life will be replenished (as well as the 5 charged shots).

If the player dies, all of the orbs and power-ups are lost and must be gained again. The player only has 1 life in the game, but may continue up to five times initially. Extra continues may be earned through bonus stages throughout the game, which are levels triggered by bells in the levels which transport Jackie to the bonus stages, each of which have a 30-second time limit and usually involve jumping on clouds or hitting statues to earn points. At the end of 30 seconds, those points are tallied and may also be used to buy extra lives and special attacks.

== Release and reception ==
Reception

Review scores
Publication	Score
Electronic Gaming Monthly	NES: 7/10, 6/10, 8/10, 7/10
Famitsu	TG-16: 6/10, 7/10, 8/10, 7/10
GamePro	NES: 23/25

Jackie Chan's Action Kung Fu was released in Japan for the PC-Engine on January 18, 1991.
