= Unsolved Crimes =

2008 video game

- European packaging artwork
- Developer: Now Production
- Publisher: Empire Interactive
- Platform: Nintendo DS
- Release: NA: September 30, 2008; PAL: October 24, 2008
- Genre: Adventure games
- Mode: Single-player

Unsolved Crimes is an adventure video game for Nintendo DS, developed by Now Production and published by Empire Interactive.

== Plot ==
The game is set in 1970s New York City. The player is a rookie detective from the homicide division. There are eight cases in the game, and one larger case divided into sections which occurs as an overarching narrative across the game. In this case, a former model named Betsy Blake goes missing. She is the sister of the player's partner, Marcy Blake.

== Gameplay ==
The DS offers a variety of things on the touch screen. Memos, evidence, profiles of suspects and movements are done through the touch screen.

In almost every case players must answer queries. These are often multiple-choice. If the player answers wrong they lose confidence from their partner. The game is over when Marcy loses trust in them completely, or when all cases are solved.

In one case, some queries can be skipped. However, all queries must be answered to unlock a case after the player finds Betsy.

== Reception ==
Reception

Aggregate score
Aggregator	Score
Metacritic	69/100

Review scores
Publication	Score
GameSpot	6/10
IGN	6.9/10

Unsolved Crimes has received a mixed critical reception. IGN called it "a solid graphic adventure with some unfortunate blemishes", praising the "variety of game mechanics" and calling the cases "genuinely engrossing", while criticising the presentation and graphics. GameSpot called the visuals "unremarkable", criticised the use of multiple choice questions which "makes the investigations too simple." and the absence of suspect interrogations, while praising the cases as "quite engaging", the environmental sound effects, and the occasional variety provided by action sequences, concluding "There's a series of interesting crimes to solve in this DS adventure, but uncovering the truth is just too simple."
