= Bakugan Battle Brawlers (video game) =

2009 video game

- Developer: Now Production
- Publisher: Activision
- Platforms: PlayStation 3 Xbox 360; Wii; PlayStation 2 Nintendo DS
- Release: NA: October 20, 2009; EU: October 23, 2009; AU: October 28, 2009
- Genre: Action
- Modes: Single-player, multiplayer

Bakugan Battle Brawlers is a 2009 video game based on the anime series of the same name. The game is developed by Now Production and published by Activision for the PlayStation 3, PlayStation 2, Xbox 360, Nintendo DS, and Wii.

== Plot ==
At the beginning of the game, a cutscene showing Hal-G celebrating the completion of the Silent Orb and stating that all Bakugan will bow to him appears. After this, another scene showing the petrified bodies of various Bakugan in the Doom Dimension is shown, with colored orbs floating out of the statues, creating a dragon-like Bakugan, who then flies upwards.

On Earth, the player is seen being teased by Shuji and his younger brother, Akira, due to their passion for Bakugan, yet not knowing how to battle. After Shuji tells the player that they'll learn the rules "the hard way," Dan Kuso, a Battle Brawler specializing in the Pyrus attribute, shows up, offering to teach the player. The player's available Bakugan change from the home console version and the DS, with the former versions giving the player a Serpenoid, Juggernoid, and Saurus that match with the player's chosen attribute, while the player starts with a Pyrus Serpenoid, Aquos Juggernoid, and Ventus Falconeer on the DS. When the player wins their battle against Shuji, Dan tells them that they should compete in the Neo Challengers Tournament. After the player visits the Bakugan Store, run by Alice, a Battle Brawler, they head back to the park when flashes of light spontaneously appear. After the final flash, a Bakugan matching the player's chosen attribute named Leonidas appears, who agrees to become the player's Guardian Bakugan in order to fight.

After the player wins the tournament, Dan shows up to congratulate the player, while Runo and Marucho, who were participants in the tournament as well as being active Battle Brawlers, attempt to convince the player to abandon Leonidas due to his violent personality, which they swiftly refuse, with Dan agreeing with the player. Dan then invites the player to the park to learn about Tag Team battles and to be their partner in the next tournament, which uses that battle format. A situation nearly identical to the first tournament occurs after the player and Dan win.

Dan tells the player to go to the park to learn about Battle Royales, as the next tournament is exclusively in that format. After the battle, the player heads to the park's stairs (in the console versions) or their room (in the DS version) and receives a message that Dan and Dragonoid was attacked and defeated by a strange Bakugan and its brawler. Due to this, when the player walks down the tournament center's hallway to participate, the Subterra Battle Brawler Julie accuses the player and Leonidas of being the culprits, with Runo and Marucho backing her up. After the player wins the tournament, a person named Marduk appears with his Guardian Bakugan, Vladitor. Marduk demands a battle with the player, but before it starts, Dan appears and confronts Marduk, revealing that he was the one who attacked him. When the player wins the battle, Vladitor informs the player that he and Leonidas were born in the Doom Dimension, with the player in disbelief. The Bakugan asks Leonidas to join him to rule over all Bakugan, which he refuses. After Leonidas tells the player that Vladitor was telling the truth, the player still refuses to abandon him. A very similar occurrence happens in the Maximum Power tournament, with Shun, the Ventus Battle Brawler, telling the player to abandon Leonidas. After winning, Alice's alter-ego Masquerade and his Guardian Bakugan Hydronoid demands a battle with the player. Masquerade gives Leonidas the same offer that Vladitor gave him, which he refuses again.

A cutscene reveals that Vladitor was released by Hal-G, Naga, and Masquerade to aid in their goals to rule over all Bakugan. After Hal-G offers him the Silent Orb, a weaker version of the Silent Core, Vladitor agrees to defeat the Battle Brawlers and Leonidas. After the cutscene and when the player signs up for the Master Cup Tournament, Dan makes an offer to the player, allowing them to become a Battle Brawler if they defeat him in the tourney. After the player wins and joins the group, Masquerade and Marduk appear to inform them that they are participating in the Ultimate Battle Tournament, with the Brawlers quickly realizing that it would spell disaster if either of them won. The player must win the Ultimate Battle Tournament, with each Battle Brawler, Masquerade, and Marduk being their opponents. After the player wins, Hal-G appears to voice his frustrations with Vladitor before he steals the Silent Orb to evolve into Battle Ax Vladitor. The Bakugan turns the Haos Arena, the setting of the Ultimate Battle Tournament, into the Darkus Arena, which has the Doom Dimension's energy. After the teleportation, the Brawler's Guardian Bakugan fall to the ground, becoming victims of the Doom Dimension. Leonidas, having been born in the dimension, is left as the only Bakugan still standing, who is focused on by the powers of the other Guardian Bakugan to evolve into Omega Leonidas. After the player and Omega Leonidas defeat Marduk and Vladitor, both Bakugan disappear, to the dismay of both Marduk and the player. The player makes an offer to Marduk to battle later, which he accepts.

Days later, the player heads to the park and reminisces about his time with Leonidas, before the same flashes of light as before appear again. Leonidas reappears in the same spot and explains that his revival was made possible by Vladitor giving his remaining energy to him, saying 'he deserved it,' leaving Leonidas to assume that Vladitor "wasn't all bad". The game ends with the player throwing Leonidas in the air as both of them shout "Bakugan brawl!"

== Gameplay ==
The battles in this game are different from the anime series and the general rules. At the beginning players place a gate card, which will land on the field. Then they must choose one of their own Bakugan and throw them by aiming and steering to make them land where needed. A player can shoot at their opponent's Bakugan while it's rolling, potentially sending it flying off the board or causing their opponent to miss a boost. On the DS version, shooting at the Bakugan is replaced with being able to steer the opponent's Bakugan with the touch screen. When a Bakugan is upgraded enough, the player can fill a bar to use a special shot based on the Bakugan's attribute.

There are four ways to win a gate card: a "double stand" which happens if a player lands two Bakugan on the same gate card, a "Stay" when a player has all three Bakugan on separate gate cards and selects one that goes uncontested, a Critical K.O, or by a battle. When Bakugan from different sides stand on the same gate card, a battle starts. It is possible at that point to activate up to three Ability Cards in order to power-up the Bakugan or to change the battle rules. The fight itself consists of one of three different mini-games (shooting if on a Gold Card, shaking if on a Copper Card, and pressing buttons at the right time on a Silver Card) on console versions. With the help of these mini-games both Bakugan gain more G-Power, which decides who will win the fight and thus gain a gate card. On the DS version, battles are instead determined by an icon shown on a gate card, with five being available (rubbing an attribute symbol, tapping the symbol when it reaches the center of the touch screen, holding the stylus on the symbol while it moves in a predefined loop, holding the stylus on a symbol bouncing across the screen to slow it down and burst it, and turning the symbol), while only one Ability Card may be played per battle. Critical K.O.'s are only possible to perform on the console versions with a Pyrus or Subterra Bakugan's special shot, Pyrus Strike and Subterra Quake respectively, as well as a sphere attack that completely drains a Bakugan's G-Power, while in the DS version, they can be performed by any Bakugan in a similar way that a Sphere Attack would be done, but with higher speed and the requirement of standing on the card as the targeted Bakugan is hit.

Whoever gets to collect three gate cards will win the match. By winning, BP (Bakugan Points) are earned which can be used to upgrade Bakugan or buy new Bakugan, gate cards, and ability cards. When winning matches under certain conditions at the park, such as by only using Bakugan belonging to a single attribute, the Guardian Bakugan of various NPCs can be unlocked in the store.

== Reception ==
Bakugan Battle Brawlers

Aggregate score
Aggregator	Score				
Aggregator	DS	PS2	PS3	Wii	Xbox 360
Metacritic	60/100	N/A	63/100	62/100	60/100

Review scores
Publication	Score				
Publication	DS	PS2	PS3	Wii	Xbox 360
The A.V. Club	N/A	N/A	N/A	C	N/A
GameZone	6.4/10	N/A	N/A	5.6/10	5.5/10
IGN	6/10	5.8/10	6.2/10	6.2/10	6.2/10
Jeuxvideo.com	11/20	11/20	11/20	11/20	11/20
NGamer	52%	N/A	N/A	N/A	N/A
Nintendo World Report	N/A	N/A	N/A	8/10	N/A
Official Xbox Magazine (US)	N/A	N/A	N/A	N/A	6/10
TeamXbox	N/A	N/A	N/A	N/A	6.2/10

The game received "mixed" reviews on all platforms according to the review aggregation website Metacritic.

In North America, the Nintendo DS version was the second best selling release for the platform during Holiday 2009.
