= Pac-Man World Rally =

2006 video game

- North American PS2 cover art
- Developer: Smart Bomb Interactive
- Publishers: NA: Namco Bandai Games; EU: Electronic Arts (Note: Published under the Namco brand.)
- Composers: Tommy Tallarico; Dweezil Zappa; Mike Rubino; Rod Abernethy; Charlie Malone
- Series: Pac-Man
- Platforms: PlayStation 2, PlayStation Portable, GameCube, Windows
- Release: PlayStation 2: NA: August 22, 2006; EU: March 16, 2007; AU: March 29, 2007; GameCube, PlayStation Portable: NA: August 22, 2006; Windows: NA: August 31, 2006
- Genre: Racing
- Modes: Single-player, Multiplayer

Pac-Man World Rally, known in Europe as Pac-Man Rally, is a 2006 kart racing game in the Pac-Man series. It was developed by Smart Bomb Interactive and published by Bandai Namco Games, and released on August 22, 2006, for the PlayStation 2, GameCube, PlayStation Portable, and Microsoft Windows. An Xbox version of the game was cancelled, though a preview of the game can be found in the Xbox release of Pac-Man World 3.

A follow-up, Pac-Man Kart Rally, was released for iOS in 2010 and Windows Phone and Android in 2012, including a release for Fire TV. Kart Rally was later delisted from all platforms except the Fire TV app store in March 2018.

== Gameplay ==
In Pac-Man World Rally, up to four players race as characters from the Pac-Man series and other Namco franchises to be the first to win. On every track, there are Pac-Boxes containing items that the player can use to give themselves a boost or hinder their opponents. Players can perform powerslides to turn around sharp corners, receiving a quick boost of speed if performed successfully. As a player performs a powerslide, it will begin to fill their Guardian Meter; each time it fills, players will be granted a Guardian, which can be deployed to temporarily shield them from all attacks.

Driving over a fruit button will cause that fruit to appear on the race track; players who collect a fruit will gain access to a corresponding shortcut, giving them the opportunity to overtake their opponents. Additionally, players can collect Pac-Dots on the track that fill their Pac-Meter; when it is full, the player can activate a temporary transformation into the Pac-Mobile, a vehicle that gives them a boost of speed and turns opponents into blue ghosts, allowing the player to eat and briefly incapacitate them.

The main gameplay mode of Pac-Man World Rally is Circuit Mode, in which players race across four consecutive tracks for the most points; players will unlock new content through progression in this mode, including additional characters, tracks, and items. Players can also play single races in Quick Race mode, or play a Time Trial challenge to finish a track in the fastest time possible. A Battle mode allows players to compete in arenas in five different battle types: Deathmatch, in which players must achieve a set number of eliminations; Free For All, in which players must eliminate the most opponents within the time limit; Last Kart Driving, in which players attempt to be the last one eliminated; Binge, in which players attempt to collect the most fruit within a time limit; and Classic, in which players compete to collect the most Pac-Dots.

The game features 14 playable characters and 15 tracks in all versions. The PSP version features two exclusive characters, along with an additional race track based on Dig Dug, two additional battle arenas, and three exclusive challenge modes.

=== Playable Characters ===
- Blinky
- Clyde
- Erwin
- Fygar
- Inky
- Jr. Pac-Man
- Mappy (Note: PSP-only)
- Mr. Driller
- Ms. Pac-Man
- Pac-Devil
- Pac-Man
- Pinky
- Pooka
- The Prince
- Spooky
- Toc-Man

== Reception ==
Reception

Aggregate scores
Aggregator	Score
GameRankings	PC: 65%
Metacritic	GC: 57/100; PS2: 54/100; PSP: 51/100

Review scores
Publication	Score
Eurogamer	6/10
GameSpot	5/10
GamesRadar+	2.5/5
GameZone	5.2/10
Nintendo World Report	6.5/10

Pac-Man World Rally received mixed reviews on all consoles according to review aggregator Metacritic. Screen Rant placed the game on their list of the nine worst racing games of all time in 2021. Eurogamer's Dan Whitehead judged "Still, if you've been fiending for a decent PS2 kart racer you can play without vomiting your bones out in horror, here's where your money should be going."
