= The Munchables =

2009 video game

- Developer: Now Production
- Publisher: Namco Bandai Games (Note: Published under the Namco brand outside North America.)
- Platform: Wii
- Release: NA: May 26, 2009; EU: June 19, 2009; JP: September 3, 2009
- Genres: Action, platform
- Modes: Single-player, multiplayer

The Munchables, known in Japan as Tabemon (たべモン), is an action-platform game developed by Now Production and published by Namco Bandai Games for the Wii video game console. The player controls the titular Munchables, creatures of insatiable appetite, who use their gurgitating prowess to consume enemies, which are known as "Tabemon Monsters", space pirates who have invaded the Munchables' home planet, known as Star Ving, and bear an uncanny resemblance to various foods.

== Plot ==
Star Ving, a planet that has many islands which are all connected together by rainbows, is the home of the Munchables, spherical, food-loving creatures with unsustainable appetites, who are all led by the mysterious "Great Elder". Each island of Star Ving contains a "Legendary Orb", a magical object that provides plenty of food for the Munchables, but one day, a fleet of UFOs invade Star Ving and steal all of the Legendary Orbs one by one. A UFO then unleashes masses of "Tabemon monsters", space pirates who are trying to rule the universe, all over the islands to destroy everything in their wake. Oddly, these monsters all appear to look like various foods, much to the Munchables' liking. The Great Elder decides to use this to his advantage and goes with two distinct Munchables, named Chomper and Munchy, to explore the islands of Star Ving, devour the Tabemon monsters, and retrieve all of the Legendary Orbs.

Over time, the main villain of the game starts to show himself, and becomes wary of his minions being defeated. The Great Elder realizes who the villain is over time as well, and starts to fill in the player on his suspicion. Despite this, the heroes and villains do not actually meet until the final island, Mount Brim. There, the villain turns out to be Don Onion, a Tabemon monster who leads the entire race. It is stated that he was a former colleague of the Great Elder, in which he began corrupting their previous experiments to take over the world. It is also revealed that the Great Elder is a Tabemon monster himself, which explains the running gag in which the playable characters constantly try to eat him. After the defeating Rice Baller, the final boss Don Onion sends to fight them, and reclaiming all of the Legendary Orbs, the Munchables are invited to Fort Entrée, where Don Onion, defeated, claims he has decided to stop with his evil plans and has gone through a change in heart. However, this proves to be a trap, as the villain leaves to steal all of the Legendary Orbs again while the player must find a way out of the space fleet. After finally escaping from the space fleet and getting back to Star Ving, the heroes are too late as Don Onion has used all of the Legendary Orbs to create his most powerful Tabemon monster: a mechanical monstrosity called King Pumpkin.

Using the combined forces of the islands of Star Ving themselves, the Munchables are able to destroy King Pumpkin. In the game's ending, however, Don Onion flees into space with the Great Elder's rocket, but much to Don Onion's surprise, Chomper and Munchy sneak on board and eat away the interior of the rocket, causing it to crash-land back on Star Ving. Don Onion winds up trapped in the wreckage of the rocket, and Chomper, Munchy and the Great Elder stare into the night sky and cry as the credits roll.

== Gameplay ==
The Munchables is a free-roaming 3D platforming game where the player controls one of two available characters, also known as the Munchables, as the name implies. The player must traverse the seven islands of the planet Star Ving in an attempt to free them from the control of the Tabemon monsters. Each island of Star Ving is broken into three levels: the first mission revolves around the player exploring the environment and eating monsters, usually with a certain goal such as eating all of a certain type of monster, or traveling to a specific location on the map. The second mission always involves traveling to a certain point in the level to defeat a particularly large and powerful monster referred to as the "Leader Pirate". Finally, the third mission involves the player fighting a Boss Pirate, powered up by the island's Legendary Orb, which must be defeated in order to successfully reclaim that island.

During the levels in The Munchables, the player controls their Munchable with the Wii Remote and Nunchuk. The player can choose between Chomper or Munchy to play as (as well as Robo once the player has completed the game), each character possessing different strengths and weaknesses. The characters in the game can move, jump, and eat enemies based around foods such as fruits, vegetables, desserts, and even robots in order to grow and become stronger. Each character also possesses a rolling attack, initiated by pressing the B button, which allows them to knock back smaller foes and take down enemies that are too large to eat, splitting them into multiple smaller versions of the enemy, which can then be eaten individually. The player can also hold the A button, which can be used to ingest enemies, until the character glows; releasing the A button causes their Munchable to charge forwards and eat multiple enemies at once. Enemies, the Munchables, and other edible objects are marked with tags that display their power level. If an enemy or object is at a level higher than the current level of the player's Munchable, it cannot be eaten until their character reaches that level or higher. By eating more and more enemies, the player's Munchable will grow bigger and stronger, advancing in level and enabling them to eat larger enemies and destroy barriers in order to access new areas. When the Munchable has eaten enough, they will evolve into a larger, stronger, and more visually detailed form; this can occur up to three times during a level. If the character eats enough after the third evolution, they will eventually reach the maximum level and be unable to grow any stronger. Additional mechanics feature special power-ups that all last for a limited time; the vacuum enables the player to automatically suck up small enemies and obstacles nearby, the rocket allows them to move faster and cross gaps while scooping up enemies in the Munchable's mouth, the weight lets the player stun any enemies in the vicinity by making them fall to the ground, and the ninja star allows them to instantly break apart larger enemies by running into them.

However, the Munchables are not invincible. Getting hit by an enemy's attack or a stage hazard, falling into a pit, touching lava, or accidentally eating a bomb enemy will cause the player's Munchable to become stunned briefly, as well as lowering their score. By shaking the Wii Remote while stunned, their Munchable can recover and continue playing the level. However, if the character gets hit again while stunned, then the player will automatically get a Game Over and have to restart the mission. At the end of each mission, the player is scored by how many orbs their Munchable expels from their body (all depending on how much they ate) and are granted a lettered rank from "C" to "S" based on the number. By collecting glowing acorns, which can be found in the levels, the Munchables gain even more points, and collecting all of the acorns in a single level will win them a new accessory to decorate their character with. The game also features 2-player co-op, with the second player controlling a targeting-reticle on the screen with a Wii Remote and using it to shoot enemies in order to help the player with combat and exploration. Upon completing the game, the Mirror Mode becomes available, in which the player must clear the stage in reverse while they are under a time limit.

== Reception ==
Reception

Aggregate score
| Aggregator | Score |
|---|---|
| Metacritic | 71/100 |

Review scores
| Publication | Score |
|---|---|
| Destructoid | 6.5/10 |
| Famitsu | 31/40 |
| GamePro | 4/5 |
| GameRevolution | B− |
| GameSpot | 6/10 |
| GameZone | 8/10 |
| Nintendo Life | 8/10 |
| Nintendo Power | 7/10 |
| Nintendo World Report | 8/10 |
| Official Nintendo Magazine | 64% |
| 411Mania | 8.1/10 |
| Teletext GameCentral | 5/10 |

The Munchables received "average" reviews according to video game review aggregator Metacritic. In Japan, Famitsu gave it a score of one eight, one seven, and two eights for a total of 31 out of 40.
