= Pac-Man World 3 =

2005 video game

- Packaging artwork
- Developer: Blitz Games
- Publishers: NA: Namco Hometek; EU: Electronic Arts
- Directors: Phil Drinkwater; John Jarvis
- Producer: Team Paku
- Designers: Adam Breeden; Mark Neesam; Alex Johnson; Paul Stockley; Aron Tomlin; Mark Witts
- Programmer: Fred Williams
- Artists: Stephen Thomson; Duncan Nimmo
- Writer: Richard Boon
- Composers: John Guscott; Matt Black
- Series: Pac-Man
- Platforms: PlayStation 2 GameCube; Windows; Xbox; PlayStation Portable; Nintendo DS
- Release: November 15, 2005: PlayStation 2, Xbox; NA: November 15, 2005; AU: February 6, 2006; EU: May 5, 2006 GameCube; NA: November 15, 2005; EU: June 23, 2006 Windows; NA: November 15, 2005; EU: July 28, 2006 PlayStation Portable; NA: December 6, 2005; EU: June 9, 2006 Nintendo DS; NA: December 7, 2005; EU: May 5, 2006
- Genre: Platform
- Mode: Single-player

Pac-Man World 3 is a platform video game developed by Blitz Games and published by Namco Hometek. It was released in 2005 for multiple platforms, including the PlayStation 2, GameCube, Xbox, PlayStation Portable, Nintendo DS, and Microsoft Windows. The Nintendo DS version was ported by Human Soft. Pac-Man World 3 is the third and final entry in the Pac-Man World series, and it is notable for being the only game in the trilogy not released in Japan. This installment also features Pac-Man as a fully voiced character, marking the first time he speaks in a video game outside of the cartoon series.

== Story ==
In pursuit of greater power, Erwin, a short and malicious genius, discovered a method to siphon raw energy from the Spectral Realm, the dimension inhabited by the Ghosts. He created a syphon capable of penetrating this realm, destabilizing the boundary between the Spectral Realm and Pac-Land, causing the two worlds to merge. This resulted in an environmental catastrophe, threatening the stability of both realms. During Pac-Man's 25th birthday celebration, he was unexpectedly teleported by Orson, a former adversary from the original Pac-Man World. Orson informed Pac-Man of Erwin's actions and the resulting danger to both the Spectral Realm and Pac-Land. Shortly thereafter, Pac-Man was attacked by hostile Spectral monsters, including fiery orange, green, and purple varieties, all of whom had been manipulated by Erwin's influence. Meanwhile, Inky and Blinky (Clyde) were kidnapped as part of Erwin's plan, while Pinky and Clyde (Blinky) managed to escape.

In response, Pac-Man joined forces with his allies and Orson, Pinky, and Clyde (Blinky), to stop Erwin's plans and prevent the collapse of both worlds. The group had to face numerous challenges and enemies manipulated by Erwin's power as they raced to restore balance and save both the real and Spectral realms from destruction.

== Gameplay ==
The game introduces several notable changes compared to previous Pac-Man World titles, placing a greater emphasis on action and combat elements while retaining the traditional platforming mechanics that have defined the series. Retained gameplay elements include the collection of pellets and fruit, which continue to grant points. A new feature has been added to each level, where players can find five 25th Anniversary Pac-Man Statues. Collecting all five statues within a level rewards the player with 2500 points and unlocks a bonus.

The Butt-Bounce move has been modified from previous versions, now limiting Pac-Man to a maximum of three consecutive bounces. The third bounce creates a small shockwave that extends the attack's radius, providing players with a strategic advantage in combat. Similarly, the Rev-Roll move, which was first introduced in earlier titles, functions similarly but with added flexibility. Players can now stop the Rev-Roll before it launches by pressing the jump button, allowing for more precise control. This move also has expanded utility, as it can activate certain machines and summon Pinky and Clyde through specific Summon Points scattered throughout the levels.

New gameplay mechanics further diversify the player's actions. A punching mechanic has been added, allowing Pac-Man to engage in direct combat with enemies. The game also features acrobatic pole maneuvers, such as swinging and climbing, adding new platforming challenges and increasing the complexity of navigation. B-Doings, a recurring feature in the Pac-Man series, return but now launch Pac-Man in a fixed direction, rather than allowing player control over the trajectory. Another addition is the Pac-Dot Chains, generated by machines activated with colored crystals. These chains offer both aesthetic appeal and gameplay advantages, unlocking rewards and enhancing the experience.

A key element of the gameplay involves the power pellet, now reserved exclusively for specific sequences where Pac-Man must consume them to defeat Spectral Monsters—hostile creatures from the Spectral Realm. These monsters emerge from portals and attempt to attack Pac-Man, with the power pellet's function tied to story progression. Alongside this, several new pellet types have been introduced, each offering unique benefits. The Electro-Shock Pellet replaces the punch attack with an ability to generate electricity from Pac-Man’s hands, stunning nearby enemies. The Ribbon Loop Pellet leaves a damaging trail when enclosed, allowing players to trap and damage enemies within its path.

In certain segments, players control Pac-Man as he pilots Toc-Man, a reimagined mecha character first introduced in the Pac-Man World series. These sequences involve defending against Erwin’s forces, with Toc-Man equipped for both punching and spin-based attacks, introducing new combat dynamics. In another sequence, Clyde pilots a blaster, adding further variety to the gameplay.

The game also features a museum, accessible from the main menu, where players can explore the history of the Pac-Man franchise. The museum showcases key moments and milestones in the series’ development and includes a playable port of the original Pac-Man arcade game. Furthermore, an interview with Pac-Man creator Toru Iwatani offers valuable insight into the creation and legacy of the series.

== Development and release ==
The game was originally developed under the title Pac-Man Adventures, with animator Don Bluth contributing to the project. Bluth, who had previously worked on I-Ninja, created concept art featuring various alien and creature designs, as well as a version of the protagonist from Dig Dug. Some concept art also depicted Pac-Man with expressions suggesting a potential gameplay mechanic involving a loss of control, which ultimately did not appear in Pac-Man World 3. The project was eventually canceled and reworked into Pac-Man World 3, with Bluth's involvement ending. Jeffrey Lujan, former director of external development at Namco, suggested Bluth for the project. UK-based developer Blitz Games was brought on due to Namco's internal restructuring at the time.

== Release and legacy ==
Pac-Man World 3 was released by Namco Hometek on November 15, 2005, for Windows, GameCube, PlayStation 2, and Xbox, with versions for PlayStation Portable and Nintendo DS following on December 6 and December 7, respectively.

In Europe, Electronic Arts, under an existing deal with Namco Europe, announced plans to co-publish and distribute the game in early 2006. The game was released on May 5, for PlayStation 2, Xbox, and DS, for GameCube on June 23, and for Windows on July 28.

In 2008 for North America only, the PlayStation 2 versions of Pac-Man World 3, Pac-Man World 2, and Pac-Man World Rally were released in a 3-pack called Pac-Man Power Pack.

On October 30, 2012, the Nintendo DS version of Pac-Man World 3 was re-released in North America as part of a Dual Pack bundle with Namco Museum DS.

The previous games in the Pac-Man World series have been remastered for ninth-generation consoles. Certain publications and fans have requested a remake of Pac-Man World 3, while acknowledging that the game would need retooling for modern audiences. After the release of Pac-Man World 2 Re-Pac, Namco released a survey questioning if players would purchase a remake of Pac-Man World 3 or a new entry in the Pac-Man World series.

== Reception ==
Reception

Aggregate scores
Aggregator	Score					
Aggregator	DS	GameCube	PC	PS2	PSP	Xbox
GameRankings	41.38%	65.83%	71.20%	62.21%	65.08%	64.23%
Metacritic	44/100	66/100	74/100	63/100	61/100	65/100

Review scores
Publication	Score					
Publication	DS	GameCube	PC	PS2	PSP	Xbox
Eurogamer	N/A	N/A	N/A	4/10	N/A	N/A
Game Informer	N/A	6.3/10	N/A	6.3/10	N/A	6.3/10
GameSpot	N/A	6.9/10	6.3/10	6.9/10	N/A	6.9/10
GameZone	N/A	N/A	N/A	N/A	7.0/10	N/A
IGN	4/10	6.9/10	N/A	6.9/10	6.9/10	6.9/10

The game received generally mixed reviews from critics. While elements retained from previous entries were generally well received, the game was criticized for repetitive gameplay and lower difficulty.

The Nintendo DS release, in particular, received lower scores than other versions and criticism for technical issues, including glitches.
