= Ms. Pac-Man =

1982 video game

- North American arcade flyer
- Developers: General Computer Corporation; Midway Manufacturing
- Publisher: Midway Manufacturing
- Designer: Steve Golson (HW)
- Series: Pac-Man
- Platform: Arcade: Atari 2600, Atari 5200, Atari 8-bit, Commodore 64, VIC-20, Apple II, TI-99/4A, IBM PC, ZX Spectrum, Atari 7800, NES, Genesis/Mega Drive, Master System, Game Boy, Game Gear, Atari Lynx, Super NES, Game Boy Color
- Release: February, 1982: Arcade; NA: February, 1982 (Note: The game's release is often erroneously cited as 1981, which is the year shown in-game and on the cabinet.) 2600; February 1983 5200; September 1983 Atari 8-bit; November 1983 C64; NA: Early 1984; EU: 1985 VIC-20; Early 1984 Apple II, TI-99/4A; April 1984 IBM PC; July 1984 ZX Spectrum; UK: 1985 7800; May 15, 1986 NES; NA: May 1990 (Tengen version); NA: November 1993 (Namco version) Genesis/Mega Drive; NA: July 1991; PAL: 1995 Master System; EU: 1991 Game Boy; NA: October 1993; EU: 1993 Game Gear; NA: 1993 Super NES; NA: November 11, 1996; EU: March 1997 Game Boy Color; NA: November 3, 1999; EU: 1999
- Genre: Maze
- Modes: Single-player, multiplayer
- Arcade system: Namco Pac-Man

Ms. Pac-Man (Note: Japanese: ミズ・パックマン, Hepburn: Mizu Pakku Man) is a 1982 maze video game developed by General Computer Corporation (GCC) and published by Midway Manufacturing for arcades. It is a sequel to Pac-Man (1980), and the first entry in the series to not be made by Namco. Controlling the title character, Pac-Man's wife, the player is tasked with eating all of the pellets in an enclosed maze while avoiding four colored ghosts. Eating the larger "power pellets" lets the player eat the ghosts, which turn blue and flee.

General Computer made the game as a modification kit for the original Pac-Man, titled Crazy Otto. However, due to previous legal action with Atari, Inc., GCC was forced to present the project to Midway Manufacturing, the North American distributor of Pac-Man. Midway purchased the project and enlisted GCC to use the game as a basis for the sequel to Pac-Man. Multiple names were considered for the game, including Miss Pac-Man and Mrs. Pac-Man, before the final name Ms. Pac-Man was chosen for being easier to pronounce. While development had started without Namco's consent, company president Masaya Nakamura was brought in and provided feedback on the player character's design. Namco ultimately collected the same royalties on each Ms. Pac-Man cabinet as it had with Pac-Man.

Ms. Pac-Man was acclaimed by critics for its improvements to the original gameplay and for having a female protagonist; some have described it as superior to Pac-Man. It has been listed among the greatest video games of all time and as one of the most successful American arcade games ever made. The game's success inspired a variety of successful merchandise, several ports for numerous home consoles and handheld systems, a television cartoon that included Pac-Man, and numerous video game sequels and remakes that spawned a Ms. Pac-Man spin-off series. The rights to the game are owned by Namco's successor company, Bandai Namco Entertainment. However, the game and its title character have suffered legal ownership issues between Namco and General Computer Corporation.

== Gameplay ==
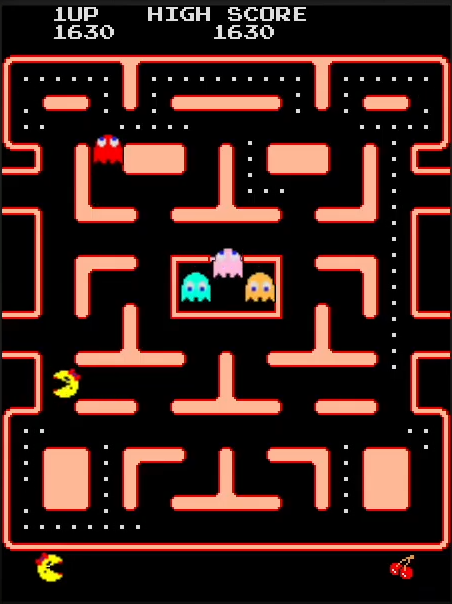
In-game screenshot. The ghosts are beginning to find and chase Ms. Pac-Man. At bottom left is the player's life count, and at bottom right the level icon (in this case a cherry). At top is the player's score.

The gameplay is very similar to that of Pac-Man. The player earns points by eating pellets and avoiding ghosts (contact with one causes Ms. Pac-Man to lose a life). Eating an energizer (or power pellet) causes the ghosts to turn blue, allowing them to be eaten for extra points. Bonus fruits can be eaten for increasing point values, twice per round. As the rounds progress, the speed increases, and energizers generally lessen the duration of the ghosts' vulnerability, eventually stopping altogether.

=== Differences from Pac-Man ===
- The game has four mazes that appear in different color schemes and alternate after each of the game's intermissions are seen. The pink maze appears in levels one and two; the light blue maze appears in levels three, four, and five; the brown maze appears in levels six to nine; and the dark blue maze appears in levels 10 to 13. After level 13, the maze configurations alternate every fourth level between the brown and dark blue maze in different colors.
- The pink, light blue, and dark blue mazes have two sets of warp tunnels, as opposed to only one in the original maze.
- The walls have a solid color rather than an outline, which makes it easier for a novice player to see where the paths around the mazes are.
- The orange ghost is called Sue, rather than Clyde; her color was later changed to purple in Pac-Land to differentiate her.
- The ghosts' behavioral patterns are different, and include semi-random movement, which prevents the use of patterns to clear each round. Blinky (red) and Pinky (pink) move randomly in the first several seconds of each level, until the first reversal. Inky (cyan) and Sue (orange) still use the same movement patterns from the previous game to their respective corners, again until the first reversal.
- Instead of appearing in the center of the maze, the fruits bounce around the maze, entering and (if not eaten) leaving through the warp tunnels. Once all fruit has been encountered, they appear in random sequence for the rest of the game, starting on the eighth round; a 5000-point banana can be followed by a 100-point pair of cherries, for example.
- When Ms. Pac-Man makes contact with a ghost and dies, she spins around, or as the back of the flier says, "she dramatically swoons and falls" rather than folding in on herself as the original Pac-Man did.
- The three intermissions follow the developing relationship between the original Pac-Man and Ms. Pac-Man (from when they first meet to having a stork drop off their baby). The latter served as the basis for Baby Pac-Man and is referenced in Jr. Pac-Man.
- The slowdown applied to the ghosts in the warp tunnels only applies to the first three rounds in this game.
- The sound effects and music are all new.

== Development ==
Ms. Pac-Man was originally conceived as an enhancement kit for Pac-Man called Crazy Otto, created by programmers at General Computer Corporation (GCC). While Crazy Otto was in development, GCC settled a lawsuit with Atari, Inc. over its Missile Command conversion kit Super Missile Attack. Part of the settlement terms barred GCC from selling conversion kits without consent from the original game manufacturer.

Rather than scrapping Crazy Otto entirely, the programmers chose to present the finished game to Midway, Namco's American distributor of Pac-Man. Midway was enthusiastic that such a game had come to their attention, as they were hoping to capitalize on the success of Pac-Man with a sequel. They bought the rights to Crazy Otto and worked with GCC and Namco to prepare the game for release. In the final development, the game's name and characters experienced multiple changes. Sprites, text and minor game elements were altered to better reflect the Pac-Man series.

The game was initially titled Super Pac-Man, containing Pac-Man as the lead character. Inspired by the cutscenes of Crazy Otto, featuring Crazy Otto's female counterpart. The lead character was made female and the game was renamed Pac-Woman. That name was dropped in favor of Miss Pac-Man, but the developers then realized that, given the third intermission showing a stork delivering a baby to Pac-Man and the player's character, confusion could arise about their relationship. In light of this, the name was changed to Mrs. Pac-Man, and then finally to Ms. Pac-Man, which rolled off the tongue more easily. Programmer Steve Golson said: "In the span of just two weeks, it went from Crazy Otto to Super Pac-Man to Miss Pac-Man." These later changes (Miss, Mrs., and Ms.) all occurred within 72 hours of actual production.

Shortly before release, Stan Jarocki of Midway stated that Ms. Pac-Man was conceived in part as a response to the original Pac-Man being "the first commercial video game to involve large numbers of women as players", and it was "our way of thanking all those lady arcaders who have played and enjoyed Pac-Man". According to one 1982 estimate, a majority of Pac-Man players were women. This is corroborated by marketing chief Michael Leone of the Castle Park Entertainment Center, who noted that his company "noticed a recent trend in our game pavilions that indicates a tremendous female acceptance of the Pac-Man game", further noting it "was only natural for Midway...to introduce a Ms. Pac-Man".

GCC co-founder Doug Macrae noted Masaya Nakamura, Namco's president at the time, gave him direct feedback on the Ms. Pac-Man character. In an interview, Macrae said: "We sent out ROMs to Midway, and they sent them over to Japan for the President of Namco, Masaya Nakamura, to look at. He said: 'Love the concept, get rid of the hair.'" He added: "There was a little bit of embarrassment [at Namco] of the fact that the sequel was being done somewhere other than in their own laboratories. ...The arrangement that Namco had with Midway was that Namco would still get their royalty on Ms. Pac-Man...and Midway could choose to do whatever they wanted in paying us a royalty in addition to Namco."

Toru Iwatani, the creator of Pac-Man, is not known to have publicly commented on Ms. Pac-Man, despite questions from reporters.

== Release ==
Reporter Patrick Goldstein of the Los Angeles Times reported that the game made its public debut on February 3, 1982, "in typical showbusiness style at a press conference at the Castle Park Entertainment Center in Sherman Oaks." He noted that "[t]he game is expected to appear in many video arcades during the next few weeks."

Atari, Inc. released versions for the Atari 2600, Atari 5200, Atari 7800m and Atari 8-bit computers. There were also versions for the VIC-20, Commodore 64, ZX Spectrum, IBM PC compatibles, Apple II and TI-99/4A released under the Atarisoft label. Unlike Pac-Man, most home versions of Ms. Pac-Man include all three intermission screens from the arcade version. Whereas the Atari 2600 port of Pac-Man was infamous for its flashing ghosts, the 2600 port of Ms. Pac-Man had minimal flickering.

A tabletop version of Ms. Pac-Man was released in 1983 by Coleco. The unit was shaped like a miniature arcade cabinet, was controlled with a small built-in joystick, and used a multicolor vacuum fluorescent display. It was a runner-up for Stand-Alone Game of the Year at the 1983 Arcade Awards held in January 1984.

=== Later ports and re-releases ===
==== Hardware ====
Ms. Pac-Man has been re-released into new arcade cabinets since. In 2001, Namco released an arcade board with both Ms. Pac-Man and Galaga in honor of the 20th anniversary of both games with the subtitle "20 Year Reunion / Class of 1981". It also has Pac-Man as a hidden bonus game. The later 25th Anniversary Edition in 2005 allows all three games to be selected on the main menu. As part of Pac-Man's 30th anniversary, Ms. Pac-Man is one of the games included on the home version of Pac-Man's Arcade Party arcade machine. Pac-Man's Arcade Party was succeeded in 2018 by Pac-Man's Pixel Bash, which added 19 games to the existing roster, but Ms. Pac-Man was only available if the machine was set to Free Play.

In June 2020, Tastemakers' Arcade1Up decided to announce that Ms. Pac-Man would finally be added to its lineup of 3/4 scale arcade cabinets. The unit also contains a few other Bandai Namco arcade games, including Galaxian, Pac-Mania and Pac-Man Plus.

Additionally, a standalone, battery-powered version of the game released by Jakks Pacific can be plugged directly into a television. Ms. Pac-Man and four other games (Galaga, Mappy, Xevious, and Pole Position) are included in a self-contained joystick hand controller.

==== Software ports ====
Ms. Pac-Man has also been ported and adapted to various home and portable systems, which are detailed in the table below:

Release date	System	Developer/Publisher	Notes
1990	Nintendo Entertainment System	Tengen	Unlicensed port with many extras. It featured four different sets of mazes: the original arcade mazes, bigger mazes, smaller mazes and "strange" mazes. There was also a Pac-Booster option that let players make Ms. Pac-Man move much faster, which was only available in the original arcade game from a maintenance menu. These versions also allowed two people to play simultaneously, with player 2 as Pac-Man. The game ends at level 32, with an intermission where Pac-Man and Ms. Pac-Man say good-bye.
1991	Atari Lynx	Atari Corporation	Introduces new mazes, a fourth intermission and a power-up that gives the player a temporary speed boost.
1991	Sega Genesis/Master System	Tengen	A port of the NES version by Tengen including all the extras. In 1995 released for Mega Drive in Europe by Time Warner Interactive.
1993	Game Gear	Namco	Re-issued by Majesco in 2000.
November 1993	Nintendo Entertainment System	Namco	Namco's own licensed NES port.
1994	Super Nintendo Entertainment System	Namco	Appears as an unlockable minigame in Pac-Man 2: The New Adventures (SNES only).
1996	Super Nintendo Entertainment System	Williams Entertainment	A port of the Genesis version by Tengen including the extra features.
1996	CD-i	Namco	As part of Arcade Classics, released in Europe.
June 1996	PlayStation	Namco	As part of Namco Museum Vol. 3. It has all of the extra features of Tengen's ports, even though neither Tengen nor Williams made this version.
1998	Windows	Microsoft	As part of Microsoft Revenge of Arcade. Rereleased in 2000 as part of Microsoft Return of Arcade.
1999	Game Boy Color	Namco	With the subtitle Special Color Edition. Includes two new mazes and a bonus game (Super Pac-Man).
1999/2001	Nintendo 64/Dreamcast/Game Boy Advance/PlayStation 2/GameCube/Xbox	Namco	As part of Namco Museum 64 (on Nintendo 64), later brought to other systems as Namco Museum.
February 26, 2002	Game Boy Advance/PlayStation 2/Xbox/GameCube/Windows	Namco	Appears as an unlockable minigame in Pac-Man World 2.
c. 2003	J2ME/BREW	Namco	First release for mobile phones.
2004	Xbox	Microsoft	Included with every Xbox Live Arcade disc.
February 2005	PlayStation Portable	Namco	As part of Namco Museum Battle Collection.
August 2005	Game Boy Advance/PlayStation 2/Xbox/GameCube/Windows	Namco	As part of Namco Museum 50th Anniversary.
January 9, 2007	Xbox 360	Namco Bandai Games	Released on the Xbox Live Arcade service, featuring an online leaderboard and twelve achievements. Forward-compatible on Xbox One and Xbox Series X and Series S.
July 11, 2008	iOS	Namco Bandai Games	Released on the App Store service. It was delisted in 2022.
2010	Android	Namco Bandai Games	Released on the Google Play Store service. It was delisted in 2022
2014	PlayStation 3/ Windows/Xbox 360	Bandai Namco Games	As downloadable content in the Pac-Man Museum compilation. This compilation was delisted in 2020.
April 19, 2016	PlayStation 4/Xbox One/Windows	Bandai Namco Entertainment	As a part of the Arcade Game Series and downloadable from the Microsoft Store, Steam and PlayStation Store services.

Regarding legal issues in later years, the character's final official, playable appearance was in a Pac-Man crossover event for Sonic Dash in 2018, while her final official appearance whatsoever was as a minor cameo in the background of the Pac-Land stage in Super Smash Bros. Ultimate, later in the same year.

== Ownership ==
The GCC group agreed on October 29, 1981, to give the rights to Ms. Pac-Man to Midway in exchange for royalty payments for the game's sale. At the time, Midway held both the license and copyright from Namco for distribution of Pac-Man games, advertising, and merchandise in North America. After the game became wildly successful, Midway and GCC undertook a legal battle concerning merchandise royalties before ultimately reaching a settlement in 1983. This settlement stated that GCC members would be paid royalties by Midway for usage of Ms. Pac-Man in commercial contexts.

Namco (now Bandai Namco) made an additional agreement with the GCC stakeholders in 2008. While Bandai Namco does control the Ms. Pac-Man copyright and intellectual property, some royalty rights and obligations are unresolved.

=== AtGames dispute ===
In August 2019, AtGames, a company that specializes in microconsoles featuring older arcade games, acquired the royalties owed to GCC. AtGames had initially approached the GCC group members about licensing Ms. Pac-Man for potential products. Bandai Namco, upon learning that AtGames had been seeking these rights for a possible mini-arcade game, filed a lawsuit against AtGames alleging AtGames misrepresented itself as licensed to make Ms. Pac-Man products, and created Ms. Pac-Man mini-cabinets under those claims. It also alleged false advertising, unfair competition, and copyright infringement.

The case was ultimately dismissed with prejudice on October 27, 2020, following a request by Bandai Namco. Presiding Judge Vince Chhabria stated that "all involved parties [had] resolved the case of their own accord." The details of the settlement were kept confidential, and the current status of the Ms. Pac-Man royalties is undisclosed.

Beginning with the Arcade Archives release of Pac-Land in 2022, the Ms. Pac-Man character was removed from games that previously featured her. In her place is a new character known as Pac-Mom, who also replaces her in the Pac-Man Museum+ versions of Pac-Land, Pac-In-Time and Pac-Attack, and in Pac-Man World Re-Pac, a remake of Pac-Man World. Pac-Man World 2 Re-Pac, a remake of Pac-Man World 2, removes both the Ms. Pac-Man game from the game's arcade and the character; with Pac-Mom present in-place. The character had also been removed from the Arcade Archives release of Tinkle Pit in 2024, which saw Pac-Man replace Ms. Pac-Man's appearances in the game. Bandai Namco has not given an official reason for the change, but news outlets have assumed that it was done to avoid legal problems with AtGames.

Despite this dispute, and the removal of the character from other Namco games, certain pieces of Ms. Pac-Man merchandise, such as other manufacturer's versions of the miniature arcade cabinet concept, continue to be sold under license from Bandai Namco.

== Reception ==
In the United States, Ms. Pac-Man topped the monthly RePlay upright arcade cabinet charts for much of 1982, including most months between April and December. Pac-Man and Ms. Pac-Man also topped the US RePlay cocktail arcade cabinet charts for 23 months, from February 1982 through 1983 up until February 1984. It was listed as the highest-grossing arcade game of 1982 by Cash Box and the Amusement & Music Operators Association (AMOA), whereas RePlay magazine listed Donkey Kong as the year's highest-grossing title. Cash Box later listed Ms. Pac-Man as one of the top two highest-grossing arcade games of 1983, along with Pole Position. It was later listed by AMOA as one of the top five highest-grossing arcade video games of 1984.

Ms. Pac-Man sold 125,000 arcade units by 1988, grossed $1.2 billion by 1987, and has grossed $1.5 billion ($3.7 billion adjusted for inflation) as of 1995. InfoWorld stated that Atarisoft's Ms. Pac-Man for the Commodore 64 was as good as the best-selling Atari 8-bit version. The Genesis version of the game sold more than one million copies in the United States.

The arcade game was awarded a Certificate of Merit as runner-up for Coin-Op Game of the Year at the 1982 Arcade Awards held in January 1983.

=== Non-arcade versions ===
In January 1984, the Atari 2600 port of Ms. Pac-Man won the Video Game of the Year award at the 1983 Arcade Awards, tied with Lady Bug.

Computer Games magazine called the Commodore 64 version a "Spectacular" and "Incredible" conversion, while stating that the Atari 5200 and IBM PC versions suffered from limitations, but were nevertheless "enjoyable" ports. They later gave a "Classic" rating for other home computer versions, calling Ms. Pac-Man the "greatest" maze game. Reviewing the Super NES version, three of Electronic Gaming Monthly's four reviewers said the gameplay is timeless and universally appealing, and the enhancements appealing. The fourth, Sushi-X, felt the original game was a cheap cash-in on the popularity of Pac-Man, and had not aged well. Doctor Devon of GamePro liked the original game, but questioned the value of the Super NES port since it has somewhat frustrating controls, and since Ms. Pac-Man had already appeared on the Super NES in the form of an unlockable in Pac-Man 2: The New Adventures.

In STart, Clayton Walnum praised the Lynx version's new mazes and the added twist of the lightning power-ups, and found the game transferred well to the small screen. Julian Rignall reviewed the Atari Lynx port for CVG Magazine, writing that "it offers a fun and non-violent challenge which will appeal to anyone" giving a final score of 79 out of 100. Les Ellis reviewed the game for Raze in February 1991, stating that he liked the "neat little between-level scenes" and the "jolly title tune", and giving the game a final score of 79%. Robert A. Jung of IGN gave the Lynx version a final score of eight out of ten, writing: "A decent adaptation overall, and a good game in its own right."

Reviewing the Game Gear version, GamePro commented "If you loved the Pac-Man games, then you loved Ms. Pac-Man, and if you loved Ms. Pac-Man at the arcades, you'll love her here, too."

=== Retrospective recognition ===
In 1996, Electronic Gaming Monthly reported that the Genesis version of Ms. Pac-Man, which was released in 1991, was still among the top 20 best-selling Genesis games. The same year, Next Generation ranked the arcade version as number 12 on their "Top 100 Games of All Time", saying that it has aged far better than the original Pac-Man due to its smarter monster AI, varied mazes, moving fruits and intermissions. They added: "It has the broadest appeal of any game Next Generation has seen, with the possible exception of Tetris. Women love it. Men Love it. Children love it." In 1997, Electronic Gaming Monthly listed the Genesis and Super NES versions as number 89 on their "100 Best Games of All Time", stating that the "Two-player simultaneous play and new mazes completely revive this classic." In 1999, Next Generation listed Ms. Pac-Man as number 41 on their "Top 50 Games of All Time", commenting: "It sounds easier than it is, and it makes the game one we consistently go back to, week after week."

In 2009, Game Informer put Ms. Pac-Man tenth on its list of "The Top 200 Games of All Time", saying that it "trumped [the original Pac-Man] in nearly every way". This is down one rank from Game Informer's previous best games of all-time list. Entertainment Weekly called Ms. Pac-Man one of the top ten games for the Atari 2600 in 2013. In 2016, Ms. Pac-Man placed fifth on Time's "The 50 Best Video Games of All Time" list. In 2022, The Strong National Museum of Play inducted Ms. Pac-Man to its World Video Game Hall of Fame.
