= Pac-Land =

1984 video game

- Japanese arcade flyer
- Developer: Namco
- Publishers: JP: Namco; NA: Bally Midway; EU: Atari Games
- Designer: Tsukasa Negoro
- Programmer: Yoshihiro Kishimoto
- Artist: Hiroshi Ono
- Composer: Yuriko Keino; Hoyt Curtin
- Series: Pac-Man
- Platform: Arcade: Famicom, PC-8001, Amstrad CPC, MSX, ZX Spectrum, TurboGrafx-16, Amiga, Atari ST, Commodore 64, Atari Lynx, LCD game, X68000
- Release: October 29, 1984: Arcade; JP: October 29, 1984 (Note: Sources for the release date are conflicting. The United States Copyright Office catalogs the game's date of publication as October 29, 1984, but other sources list it as early as August 1984.); NA: December 1984; EU: Early 1985 Famicom; JP: November 21, 1985 PC-8001; JP: 1985 CPC, MSX; EU: 1988 ZX Spectrum; UK: April 1989 TurboGrafx-16; JP: June 1, 1989; NA: January 1990 Amiga, Atari ST, C64; UK: 1989 Lynx; NA: August 1991 X68000; JP: 1994
- Genre: Platform
- Modes: Single-player, multiplayer
- Arcade system: Namco Pac-Land

Pac-Land (Note: Japanese: パックランド, Hepburn: Pakku Rando) is a 1984 platform game developed and published by Namco for arcades. It was released in North America by Bally Midway, and in Europe by Atari Games. Controlling Pac-Man, the player must make it to the end of each stage to return a lost fairy back to its home in Fairyland. Pac-Man will need to avoid obstacles, such as falling logs and water-spewing fire hydrants, alongside his enemies, the Ghost Gang. Eating large flashing Power Pellets will cause the ghosts to turn blue, allowing Pac-Man to eat them for points.

Pac-Land was conceptualized by Namco Research and Development 1 programmer Yoshihiro Kishimoto, who was tasked with creating an arcade game based on the American Pac-Man cartoon television series by Hanna-Barbera. The backgrounds were made to be vibrant and colorful, and the characters to be detailed and move smoothly to match the show's animation style. The control scheme was inspired by Konami's Track & Field (1983), using buttons instead of a traditional joystick to make it stand out among other games at the time. A new Namco Pac-Land arcade system was created to make it easier to develop the game and was used for several later Namco games, including Baraduke (1985) and Metro-Cross (1985).

Pac-Land was a commercial success in arcades, becoming one of the top five highest-grossing arcade games of 1985 in the United States. It was well-received by critics for its colorful graphics, stage designs, and soundtrack, but was criticized for its difficulty. It is cited as an important and influential game in the platform genre, paving the way for many games to follow such as Super Mario Bros., Ghosts 'n Goblins, Alex Kidd and Wonder Boy. It was ported to several home consoles and computers, including the Family Computer, PC Engine/TurboGrafx-16, Commodore 64 and Atari Lynx. It is the first platform game in the Pac-Man series, and was followed by Pac-Man 2: The New Adventures (1994).

== Gameplay ==
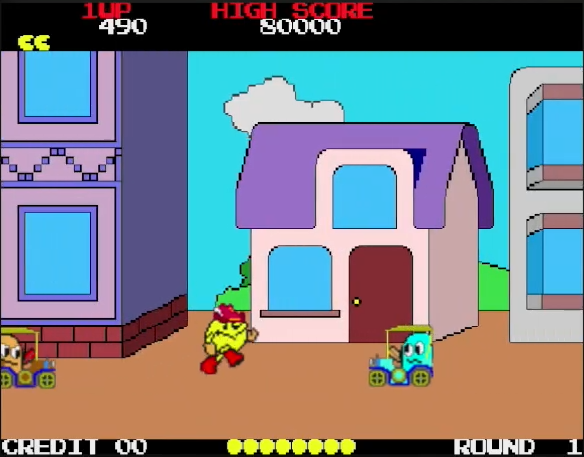
Gameplay screenshot

Controlling Pac-Man, the player is tasked with reaching the end of each level while avoiding enemies and other obstacles. Stages are known in-game as "trips" and are broken into four sections — the first three have Pac-Man running to return a lost fairy back to "Fairyland", and the last having Pac-Man return home to his family. Pressing either of the directional buttons will make Pac-Man walk in that direction, and repeatedly tapping either button will make him run. Pac-Man can also jump over pits and obstacles by pressing the jump button.

In each stage, Pac-Man will encounter the four ghosts from the original game — Blinky, Pinky, Inky and Clyde — alongside a purple ghost named Sue, originally a replacement for Clyde in Ms. Pac-Man. Eating large flashing Power Pellets will cause the ghosts to turn blue for a short time, allowing Pac-Man to eat them for bonus points. The ghosts are often seen driving vehicles, such as airplanes, buses, cars, pogo-sticks and flying saucers, and will sometimes drop miniature ghost enemies from the air to try and hit Pac-Man. Other types of obstacles are also present in stages, such as water-spewing fire hydrants, springboards, falling logs, quicksand and geysers.

Trips consist of cities, forests, deserts and abandoned castles. Most trip sections end with a large sign saying "BREAK TIME" with a church on a hill in the background, and bonus points are awarded for jumping at certain points at the end of each section. The final section of a trip gives Pac-Man a special pair of boots that will allow him to jump infinitely into the air, and tasks the player with returning home to Pac-Man's family. The player can find hidden items by pushing against specific objects in certain stages, including a helmet that protects Pac-Man from falling mini ghosts, an item that makes Pac-Man temporarily invincible and a Galaxian flagship that awards the player a large sum of points. Jumping in certain spots will reveal fruit items that can be consumed for points.

The game features the theme song from the Pac-Man television series, composed by Hoyt Curtin, which plays in a constant loop throughout. The North American version of the game by Midway features the characters being re-designed to more closely resemble the designs found in the show, while the Japanese Namco version has the characters modeled after Pac-Man marketing material and cabinet artwork. It has yet to be known what version the European version looks like until further investigations.

== Development ==
Pac-Land was programmed by Yoshihiro Kishimoto of Namco Development Division 1, who would later work on the Family Stadium franchise. After seeing the success of Hanna-Barbera's Pac-Man animated series, Namco asked Kishimoto to create an arcade game based on the show; Hanna-Barbera was not involved with the game's development beyond licensing elements related to the series. Kishimoto stated that the hardest part of development were Pac-Man's animations. Most arcade games in Japan at the time simply used two or three frames to convey movement, which he found unconvincing. The team wanted the game's backgrounds to be vibrant and colorful, and to have the characters move smoothly to replicate the show's animation style. Pac-Man himself was given 24 different frame patterns, alongside several facial expressions and clothing swaps.

Kishimoto cited Konami's sports video game Track & Field (1983) as the "number one influence" on Pac-Land. The game's controls were heavily influenced by Track & Field, a game that allowed the player to become faster by constantly tapping the button in succession; Kishimoto thought the idea was interesting and that it would make it stand out among other games. To allow for two-layer scrolling backgrounds, more sprites, and more colors, the team created the Namco Pac-Land arcade board, which was used for several later Namco games including Baraduke (1985) and Metro-Cross (1985). The game was tested in Yokohama, where Kishimoto recalls the springboards being difficult for new players.

== Release ==
The arcade game was released in Japan in 1984, but there are conflicting release dates. Arcade TV Game List, a Japanese-language book of arcade release dates authored by Masumi Akagi and published by the Amusement News Agency in 2006, lists the Japanese release date as August 1984. However, the United States Copyright Office and John Szczepaniak in the second volume of The Untold History of Japanese Game Developers (2015), when including biography details taken from Kishimoto's resume, lists the release date as October 1984. The game was later released in North America by Bally Midway in December 1984, and in Europe by Atari Games in early 1985.

== Ports ==
The first home port of Pac-Land was for Nintendo's Family Computer, released in Japan on November 21, 1985. Versions for the Amstrad CPC, ZX Spectrum, Commodore 64 and MSX were published by British company Grandslam Entertainment in 1988, and developed by Gannon Designs and Mr. Micro for the Atari ST and Commodore Amiga platforms. Namco released a PC Engine version in June 1989, which was later released for the TurboGrafx-16 by NEC in January 1990. Atari Corporation developed and published a Lynx portable version in 1991, and Dempa Softworks released an X68000 conversion in 1994.

Pac-Land was included in the 1996 compilation Namco Museum Vol. 4 for the PlayStation alongside the other five Namco arcade games from the 1980s, and later in the iOS game Namco Arcade. In 2014, it was ported to the Xbox 360, PlayStation 3, and PC as part of Pac-Man Museum, and the Famicom version was digitally re-released for the Wii U Virtual Console and Namco Museum Archives Volume 2. Aside from the Namco Arcade version, all home ports of the game are based on the Japanese Namco version.

Announced on March 31, 2022, the arcade version of Pac-Land was released on April 7, 2022 for the Nintendo Switch and PlayStation 4 as part of Hamster Corporation's Arcade Archives lineup. Though based on the original arcade version, this re-release was modified by Bandai Namco to replace the graphics of Ms. Pac-Man and Baby Pac-Man, who greet Pac-Man at the end of each trip. In their place are two new characters named "Pac-Mom" and "Pac-Sis"; which were created for the then-upcoming compilation Pac-Man Museum+, which also replaced the characters in all the games featured in the collection. Bandai Namco has remained silent on the removal of the characters, though news outlets assumed the character replacements to be related to a dispute between Bandai Namco and AtGames, which is related to Ms. Pac-Man.

The game is included in the Pac-Man Museum+ game compilation, which released on May 27, 2022. The version in this collection uses the same edited version as seen in the Arcade Archives release because of Bandai Namco's legal issues with AtGames.

== Reception ==
Reception

Review scores
Publication	Score
Computer and Video Games	90% (PCE); 92% (PCE); 7/10 (Lynx)
Electronic Gaming Monthly	7/10, 6/10, 6/10, 5/10 (Lynx)
Famitsu	7/10, 7/10, 8/10, 8/10 (PCE)
IGN	7/10 (Lynx); 6.5/10 (TG16)
Raze	74% (Lynx)

Pac-Land was a commercial success in arcades. In Japan, it entered the Game Machine arcade charts at number-two on the table arcade cabinet chart in September 1984. In North America, it was in the top 20 RePlay upright arcade game charts through November 1985. It ended the year as one of the top five highest-grossing arcade games of 1985 in the United States.

The game well received by critics for its colorful graphics, level structure, and challenge. Mike Roberts gave the arcade game a positive review in the May 1985 issue of Computer Gamer. He called it an "interesting game" where Pac-Man is an "animated character that moves along a horizontally scrolling landscape" while praising the "very colouful" graphics and stating it is "easy to play once you've got the hang of it."

Japanese publication Famitsu praised the PC Engine version's graphics and overall challenge. Computer + Video Games called the PC Engine version a "marvelous conversion" for its vibrant visuals, stage layouts, gameplay and accuracy to the coin-op game; they had a similar response for the Atari Lynx version, claiming its accuracy to the original would entice fans of the arcade release. Reviewing the Lynx conversion, IGN praised the game's colorful graphics, controls and faithfulness to the arcade original. Raze echoed a similar response, saying the visuals, stage layouts and soundtrack added replay value to the game.

Raze disliked the Lynx port's limited amount of lives and lack of continues, saying that the high difficulty would repel younger players. IGN stated it provided little replay value for veteran players, adding that it could be easily finished. AllGame was particularly critical of the TurboGrafx-16 version, lambasting its poor graphics, bland stage layouts and lack of challenge, jokingly saying it was only recommended to collectors interested in "the most morbidly poor games in existence". In a retrospective review for the TurboGrafx-16 conversion, IGN disliked the game's difficulty for lacking any real challenge, and said the game seems to have been made simply to keep Pac-Man relevant at the time instead of as a "real deal" game.

== Legacy ==
Pac-Land is an important and influential game in the platform genre, paving the way for games such as Ghosts 'n Goblins, Alex Kidd, and Wonder Boy. Pac-Man creator Toru Iwatani has since labeled it as his favorite Pac-Man sequel for its interesting concept and gameplay. He said Shigeru Miyamoto told him it had a profound influence on the creation of Super Mario Bros. Shigeru Miyamoto himself also says that Pac-Land had an influence on Super Mario Bros., but to a lesser extent, saying that while he was in Tokyo seeing Namco has developed a platforming game he decided that he should follow suit. The only feature of Pac-Land Miyamoto cites as a direct inspiration was the blue background of the game as opposed to the black ones he typically would put in his games.

Shortly after the game's release, Namco produced a board game adaptation for its Fantasy Board Game series, based on the player reaching the end of the board without losing the "fairy chip". A Japanese LCD handheld game was released in 1990. Many of Pac-Man's moves in the Super Smash Bros. series are directly based on Pac-Land, such as his fire hydrant attack. Super Smash Bros. for Wii U and Super Smash Bros. Ultimate include a stage based on the game, featuring automatic scrolling.
