= Ghosts (Pac-Man) =

Antagonists in the Pac-Man games

- Pac-Man characters
- The four original ghosts as they appear in Pac-Man (1980). From left to right: Blinky, Clyde, Inky, and Pinky.
- First game: Pac-Man (1980)
- Created by: Toru Iwatani
- Voiced by: Blinky: Chuck McCann (1982 series) Hikaru Midorikawa (World 2, (Note: In Pac-Man World 2 and World 3, the red ghost is erroneously named Clyde and the orange ghost named Blinky; the actors listed here reflect their correct names.) Japanese version) John Guerrasio (World 3) Ian James Corlett (Ghostly Adventures series) Lucien Dodge (Ghostly Adventures games) Alejandro Saab (World 2 Re-Pac) Mike Bodie (Pac-Man: Snack Breaks); Inky: Barry Gordon (1982 series) Junko Noda (World 2, Japanese version) Stuart Milligan (World 3) Lee Tockar (Ghostly Adventures series) Bryce Papenbrook (Ghostly Adventures games) Mark Whitten (World 2 Re-Pac) Mike Cefalo (Pac-Man: Snack Breaks); Pinky: Chuck McCann (1982 series) Sara Nakayama (World 2, Japanese version) Mindy Lee Raskin (World 3) Ashleigh Ball (Ghostly Adventures series) Julie Maddalena (Ghostly Adventures games) Amelia Borella (World 2 Re-Pac) Rebecca Wang (Pac-Man: Snack Breaks); Clyde: Neil Ross (1982 series) Tamotsu Nishiwaki (World 2, Japanese version) Martin Sherman (World 3, World 2 Re-Pac) Kevin Deters (Wreck-It Ralph) Brian Drummond (Ghostly Adventures series) Orion Acaba (Ghostly Adventures games) Lukas Arnold (Pac-Man: Snack Breaks)

In-universe information
- Species: Ghost

Blinky, Pinky, Inky, and Clyde, collectively known as the Ghost Gang, are a quartet of colorful ghost characters from the Pac-Man video game franchise. Created by Toru Iwatani, they first appear in the 1980 arcade game Pac-Man as the sole antagonists. The ghosts have appeared in every Pac-Man game since, sometimes becoming minor antagonists or allies to Pac-Man, such as in Pac-Man World 3 and the Pac-Man and the Ghostly Adventures animated series.

Some entries in the series went on to add other ghosts to the group, such as Sue in Ms. Pac-Man, Tim in Jr. Pac-Man, Funky and Spunky in Pac-Mania, and Kinky in Pac-Man Arrangement; however, these did not appear in most later games. Reimagined versions of them known as the G-HOSTs appear as antagonists in Shadow Labyrinth. The group has since gained a positive reception and are cited as some of the most recognizable video game villains of all time.

== Concept and creation ==
The ghosts were created by Toru Iwatani, who was the head designer for the original Pac-Man arcade game. The idea for the ghosts was made from Iwatani's desire to create a video game that could attract women and younger players, particularly couples, at a time where most video games were "war"-type games or Space Invaders clones. In turn, he made the in-game characters cute and colorful, a trait borrowed from Iwatani's previous game Cutie Q (1979), which featured similar "kawaii" characters. Iwatani cited Casper the Friendly Ghost or Little Ghost Q-Taro as inspiration for the ghosts. Their simplistic design was also attributed to the limitations of the hardware at the time, only being able to display a certain amount of colors for a sprite. To prevent the game from becoming impossibly difficult or too boring to play, each of the ghosts were programmed to have their own distinct traits — the red ghost would directly chase Pac-Man, the pink and blue ghosts would position themselves in front of Pac-Man, and the orange ghost would be random.

Originally, all four of the ghosts were meant to be red instead of multicolored, as ordered by Namco president Masaya Nakamura — Iwatani was against the idea, as he wanted the ghosts to be distinguishable from one another. Although he was admittedly afraid of Nakamura, he conducted a survey with his colleagues that asked if they wanted single-colored enemies or multicolored enemies. After being presented with a 40-to-0 result in favor of multicolored ghosts, Nakamura agreed to the decision. The original Japanese version of the game had the ghosts named "Oikake", "Machibuse", "Kimagure", and "Otoboke", translating respectively to "chaser", "ambusher", "fickle", and "stupid". When the game was exported to the United States, Midway Games changed their names to "Shadow", "Speedy", "Bashful", and "Pokey", their nicknames being changed to "Blinky", "Pinky", "Inky", and "Clyde", respectively. Early promotional material would sometimes refer to the ghosts as "monsters" or "goblins".

Uproxx argues that the ghosts are really just people in costumes, based on what is revealed between rounds in the game. A cutscene that appears after the 5th round of the game, shows the ghost Blinky chasing after Pac-Man, and his ghost costume snags on a nail and rips, revealing a leg underneath. In a later cutscene, Blinky has a rip in his ghost costume, then after going off screen, he is seen back on the screen dragging the red costume behind him.

=== Television series ===
In the 1982 Pac-Man series, the hero faced five Ghosts — four males wearing various styles of hats, and a female ghost named Sue, who wore earrings. The Ghost Monsters work for Mezmaron, who assigns them the job of finding the Power Pellet Forest.

The battle of Pac-Man vs. Ghost Monsters would have to address the issue of the original arcade game's 'cannibalism' somewhere along the line; after all, the basic appeal of Pac-Man was the indiscriminate ingestion of his foes. This was handled with such nonviolent dexterity that Hanna-Barbera could have written a textbook for Action for Children's Television on the subject. Pac-Man only chomped the Ghost Monsters when defending his loved ones or the Power Forest (as opposed to the videogame, where the lead character was on the offensive), and once chomped, the Ghost Monsters merely disappeared temporarily, re-emerging unscathed after picking up new shrouds from Mezmaron's wardrobe closet.

— Hal Erickson

The 2013 TV series Pac-Man and the Ghostly Adventures and its tie-in video games introduce a new ghost antagonist, Lord Betrayus, the ruler of the Netherworld who seeks to take over Pac-World with his ghost army. Blinky, Inky, Pinky and Clyde act as secret allies to Pac-Man, hoping to one day be restored to life in exchange.

== Reception ==
The ghosts have received a positive reception from critics and have been cited as one of the most recognizable video game villains of all time. IGN commented on each of the ghosts having their own personality and "adorable" design. Boy's Life praised their simplicity and determination, labeling them as one of the most recognizable villains in video game history. In their list of the 50 "coolest" video game villains, Complex writers Foster Kamer and Brittanny Vincent ranked the ghosts in as the fourth, noting their iconic design and recognition and for being "pretty tough customers". Metro UK listed them at second place in their list of the ten greatest video game villains of all time, praising their easy recognition and cute designs. Kotaku's Nathan Grayson stated that despite "still com[ing] a long, long way since then", the ghosts' artificial intelligence in Pac-Man was still impressive by modern standards, being "smarter than you think". Stephen Kelly of GamesRadar+ liked each of the ghosts having their own unique AI and traits, while GameSpy said that the ghosts' intelligence is one of the game's "most endearing" aspects for adding a new layer of strategy to the game. Inky alone was ranked the eighth greatest game villain of all time by Guinness World Records in 2013, based on reader votes.
