= Cutie (disambiguation) =

Cutie refers, endearingly, to a person or animal regarded as cute.

Cutie or Cuties may also refer to:

== People ==
- Alberto Cutié (born 1969), American priest and broadcaster
- Cutie Mui (born 1966), Hong Kong actress and television host
- Cutie Suzuki (born 1969), Japanese professional wrestler

== Other uses ==
- Mark 27 torpedo, US Navy weapon
- Cuties, a 2020 French film
- Cuties, a brand name for mandarin oranges

== See also ==
- Cutie Q, a 1979 arcade game
- Cute (disambiguation)
- QT (disambiguation)
