= Masaya Nakamura (businessman) =

Japanese businessman (1925–2017)

- 中村 雅哉
- Born: 24 December 1925; Yokohama, Japan
- Died: 22 January 2017 (aged 91)
- Occupation: Businessman
- Known for: Founder of Namco
- Awards: Order of the Rising Sun (4th Class, Gold Rays with Rosette)

Masaya Nakamura (Japanese: 中村 雅哉; 24 December 1925 – 22 January 2017) was a Japanese businessman and the founder of Namco. He was the company's president up until 2002, where he took a ceremonial role in its management. Following the formation of Bandai Namco Holdings, Nakamura would retain an honorary position in the video game division, Bandai Namco Entertainment.

Born in Yokohama, Nakamura graduated from the Yokohama Institute of Technology in 1948, having earned a degree in shipbuilding. Nakamura would found his own company in 1955, Nakamura Seisakusho, Ltd., which produced pop-cork guns and coin-operated mechanical rides for Japanese department store rooftops. In 1974, Nakamura purchased the Japanese division of Atari from Nolan Bushnell, seeing it as a perfect opportunity to get into the market, and were allowed to release the company's games in Japan. His company would be renamed to "Namco" in 1977, and a year later would release its first video game produced in-house. Under Nakamura's leadership, Namco would become one of the most dominant video game companies in Japan, alongside Nintendo, Sega and Konami.

Nakamura purchased Japanese film studio Nikkatsu in 1993 and be involved with many of their films, being credited for several of them. He also led Namco to begin maintaining arcade centers and amusement parks across Japan and soon overseas, such as Wonder Eggs in Tokyo, and to purchase the Aladdin's Castle chain from Bally. Nakamura would also assist in the formation of Japanese developer Monolith Soft, and become the chairman of the Japan Amusement Machine and Marketing Association (JAMMA). In 2002, he would step down as Namco's CEO, instead taking on a ceremonial role in the company's management. After Namco merged with Bandai in 2005 to form Bandai Namco Holdings, Nakamura would retain an honorary position in the company's video game branch.

Nakamura is credited as a pioneer in the video game industry for his accomplishments, and one of the most important figures in video game history. In 2007, he was awarded the "Order of the Rising Sun, Gold Rays with Rosette" by the Japanese government for his contributions to video games, and was inducted into the International Video Game Hall of Fame in 2010. His influence on the industry would have him considered "the father of Pac-Man". Nakamura died on 22 January 2017, at age 91, which was announced a week later by Bandai Namco out of respect for his family's privacy.

== Biography ==
=== Early life and formation of Namco ===
Masaya Nakamura was born on 24 December 1925, in Yokohama. He graduated from the Yokohama Institute of Technology in 1948 with a degree in shipbuilding, however following World War II he was unable to secure a job with his experience. His father owned a shotgun repair business in a Tokyo department store. In the wake of Japan's economic recovery, Nakamura founded his own company on 1 June 1955, "Nakamura Seisakusho, Ltd.". Beginning with US$3,000, he purchased two mechanical rocking horse rides that had to be installed on the roof of a department store due to stiff competition. Each day, Nakamura would clean and repair the rides if needed, and greeted the mothers of the children when they arrived. His company was renamed to "Nakamura Manufacturing Co., Limited." in 1959. Following this, Nakamura would make a deal with the Mitsukoshi department store chain in the early 1960s to install a ride on the rooftop of one of their stores. This ride, named the "Roadaway Race", was popular with children and led to Mitsukoshi commissioning Nakamura and his company to install similar rides for all of their stores. Nakamura's company would continue to design similar mechanical games for other stores — one such game was Periscope (1965), claimed to be the first game he designed himself.

=== Acquisition of Atari Japan ===
By the early 1970s, Nakamura and his company had shifted away from mechanical amusement rides to coin-operated arcades games. Many of these were racing games that used electro-mechanical projection technology, such as Racer (1970), Formula-X (1975) and F-1 (1976). In 1972, Nakamura visited the Japanese branch of Atari, formed by Nolan Bushnell as a response to the country's vast market and enthusiasm for arcade games. With the business struggling, Atari Japan was closed in 1974 and put up for auction — Nakamura saw this as the perfect opportunity to get into the video game market and purchased it for US$500,000, beating rival Sega's offer of US$50,000. Atari Japan president Hideyuki Nakajima was then promoted as vice president of Nakamura Manufacturing. In 1976, Bushnell sent Nakamura Breakout, which Nakamura saw as a sure-fire hit — to his disappointment, his company was only allowed to distribute the game and was forbidden from exclusive manufacturing rights. Nakamura, in response, requested for as many units possible.

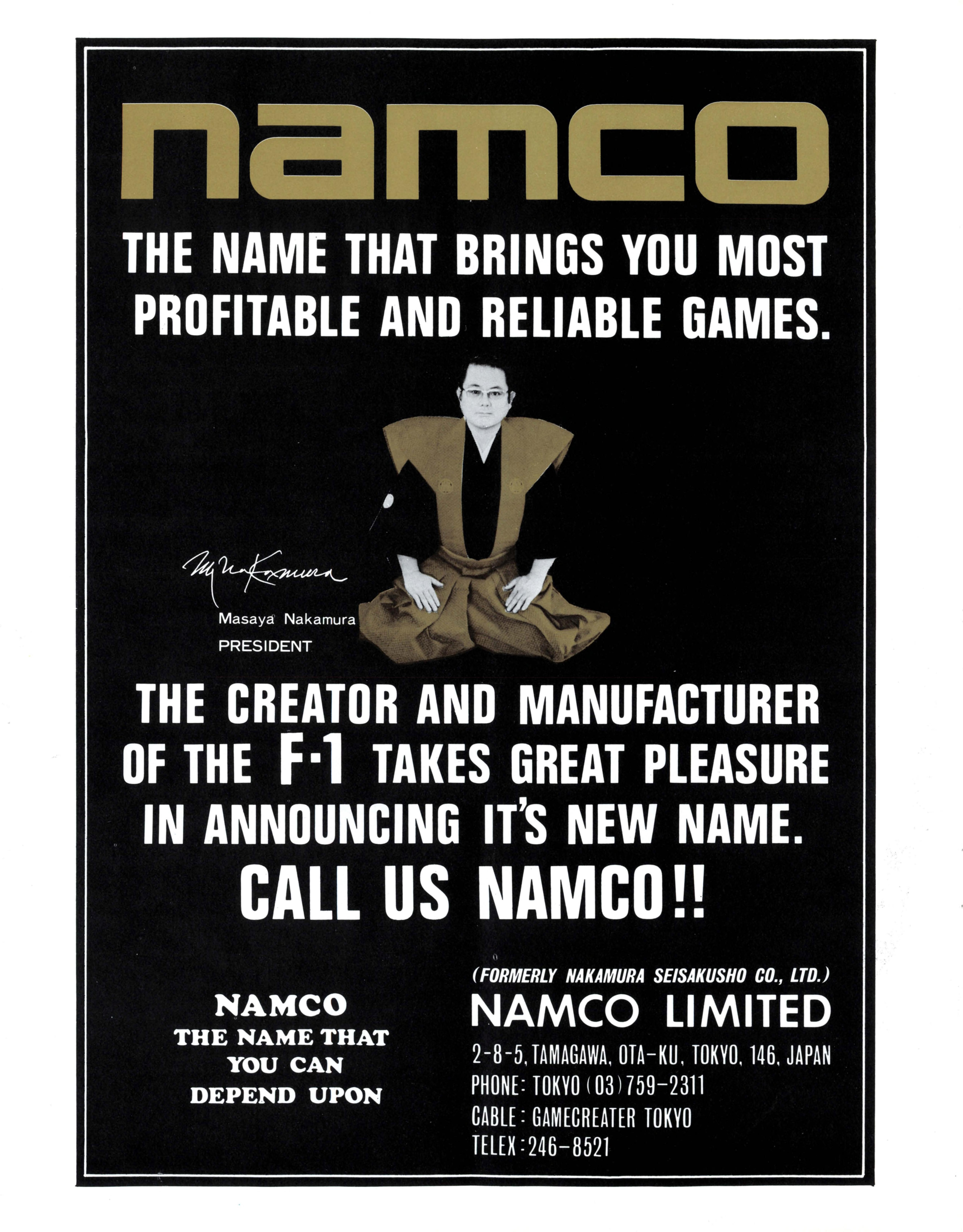
Trade advertisement from the July 1977 issue of Play Meter featuring Masaya Nakamura announcing the change of the corporate name from "Nakamura Seisakusho Co., Ltd." to "Namco"

Following his company's distribution of Breakout in Japan, Nakamura noticed a surge of counterfeit units across the country. After some investigation, he had found that a yakuza clan had been creating them, and met with their leader to request they cease production. In response, the man said he would "suppress" Nakamura's competitors and make him Japan's largest video game developer. Nakamura declined, fearing it would lead to the downfall of both his company and the industry as a whole. As a counter-measure, Nakamura requested additional Breakout units from Atari as soon as possible. Nakamura flew to London to meet with Bushnell at the Music Operators Association (MOA) tradeshow to discuss the issue — Nakamura claimed that Bushnell was drunk and unable to listen to him, leading to him having his company produce Breakout units without Atari's permission. Breakout was an unprecedented success for his company, becoming one of the most successful video game manufacturers in Asia alongside Sega and Taito. This would lead to Atari taking legal action in the 1970s. Nakamura's company was renamed to Namco in 1977, an acronym of their older name. Nakamura would also open up a division in the United States as requested by Nakajima, Namco America, located a few blocks away from the Atari headquarters in Sunnyvale, California — Nakajima would become the president of the company.

=== Arcade successes and Atari Games ===
Impressed by the success of the Atari Japan acquisition, Nakamura was interested in his company creating his own arcade games in-house. He purchased a surplus amount of PDA-80 microcomputers from NEC and instructed his employees to analyze the hardware to intentionally create video games. Namco's first in-house game was Gee Bee (1978), designed by Toru Iwatani. Namco's first major success in arcades was Galaxian (1979), credited as one of the first video games to use RGB. The game's success led to Nakamura approaching Midway Games to release some of their games in the United States, which they agreed to. Pac-Man (1980) became Namco's biggest success, selling over 400,000 arcade units in the United States alone and becoming one of the highest-grossing video games of all time. It was designed by one of Namco's new hires, Toru Iwatani, with Nakamura suggesting the game be named after the sound the character made while eating, "paku paku". In a 1983 interview, Nakamura said that he "never thought it would be this big". Under Nakamura's leadership, Namco would produce several successful games throughout the 1980s, including Galaga (1981), Ms. Pac-Man (1982), Dig Dug (1982), Pole Position (1982), Xevious (1983) and The Tower of Druaga (1984). Unlike rival companies, notably Nintendo, Nakamura tested each of Namco's video games before they were released, sometimes for up to 23 hours at a time. Nakamura is considered to have been one of the first to identify the potential of "screen addiction" due to how much younger people would play Pac-Man and his company's other games. Because of his vision in developing arcade games, Nakamura is often considered "the father of Pac-Man", and credited as one of the instrumental people behind Japan's video game industry. According to RePlay magazine, many considered Nakamura to be "the single most important person in coin-op" by 1990. Nakamura had also pushed Namco to be one of the first third-party developers for the Nintendo Family Computer, which was soaring in popularity.

In 1985, Warner Communications split Atari into two companies and sold off each of their shares. Nakamura was given 60% of the shares for Atari Games, the arcade division, and gave Nakamura the right to distribute its games in Japan, such as Marble Madness and Hard Drivin'. He had hoped the acquisition would develop a strong relation between the two companies like it once had in the 1970s, however he instead had a distaste towards it and sold off his stake to Hideyuki Nakajima in 1987, who would resign as president of Namco America and become the CEO of Tengen. In 1989, Namco had to renew the preferential terms they had for being one of Nintendo's first third-party licensees — when Nintendo president Hiroshi Yamauchi refused to renew them, Nakamura grew furious and publicly denounced Nintendo for monopolistic practices, boasting that his company would shift all home console development to the Sega Mega Drive. In 1990, Nakamura resigned as president of Namco, passing it on to Tadashi Manabe and assume his role as the company chairman. Manabe resigned in 1992 due to health problems, leading to Nakamura returning as his role of president until 2002.

=== Later years and death ===
Nakamura became chairman of the Japan Amusement Machine and Marketing Association (JAMMA), and led Namco to begin construction and maintenance of large-scale amusement parks across Japan, such as Wonder Eggs in Tokyo and Namja Town in Sunshine City. Namco would establish several high-profile franchises throughout the 1990s, notably Ridge Racer (1993) and Tekken (1994). After Namco purchased Japanese film studio Nikkatsu in 1993, Nakamura became involved with in film production and credited as executive producer in a number of their films. He was recognized by the Japanese Minister of International Trade and Industry in 1997 for his contributions to the advancement of computer entertainment. Nakamura helped assist Tetsuya Takahashi with the formation of Japanese developer Monolith Soft in 1999, where Namco would publish their Xenosaga series. The same year on 1 April, Nakamura was appointed chairman of the Multimedia Content Development Association (MCDA). Following the unveil of the Xbox, Nakamura formed an alliance with Microsoft to produce games for the console, with Namco becoming one of the first Japanese developers to support it. Nakamura stepped down as CEO of Namco in 2002, taking on a ceremonial role in the company's management. In 2005, Namco merged with Bandai to form Bandai Namco Holdings, Japan's third-largest video game developer by revenue and the seventh in the world. Nakamura retained an honorary position in its video game division Namco Bandai Games, now known as Bandai Namco Entertainment. Up to that point, Nakamura was Japan's 68th richest person.

He was awarded the "Order of the Rising Sun, Gold Rays with Rosette" by the Japanese government at the 2007 Spring Conferment of Decorations for his contributions to the Japanese entertainment industry,. and was one of the inaugural inductees in the International Video Game Hall of Fame in 2010 as one of the five video game pioneers, acknowledging his induction via a video feed. He was inducted alongside Pac-Man to coincide with the game's 30th anniversary. Nakamura died of Natural Causes on 22 January 2017, at the age of 91. The announcement was made a week later by Bandai Namco Holdings on 30 January, requesting respect for his family's privacy. His funeral was held privately, with a public memorial service planned by the company in the following weeks.
