= Quester =

1987 video game

- Advertising flyer
- Developer: Namco
- Publisher: Namco
- Director: Shinji Noguchi
- Producer: Toru Iwatani
- Designer: Toru Iwatani
- Composer: Shinji Hosoe
- Platform: Arcade
- Release: JP: September 1987
- Genre: Block breaker
- Modes: Single-player, multiplayer

Quester (Note: Japanese: クエスター, Hepburn: Kuesutā) is a 1987 block breaker video game developed and published by Namco for arcades. Controlling a paddle-like craft, the player is tasked with clearing each stage by deflecting a ball towards a formation of bricks towards the top of the screen. Power-up items are hidden in some blocks, which can increase the size of the player's paddle, a barrier that prevents the ball from moving off the screen, and a forcefield that will release eight other balls when touched.

The game was produced by Toru Iwatani, known as the creator of Pac-Man. It was created as a response to Taito's 1986 arcade title Arkanoid, which helped revive the block breaker genre and inspire waves of its own clone games. A special version of the game was released shortly after the original's release, Quester: Special Edition, featuring levels designed by readers of Namco's press literature. It was released to the Japanese Wii Virtual Console in 2009, where it was renamed to Namco Quester.

== Gameplay ==
The player reflecting a ball towards the formation of bricks, which are designed to resemble a UFO.

Quester is a block breaker video game, often compared to Taito's Arkanoid. Using a rotary knob, the player controls a paddle-like craft fixed at the bottom of the screen, the objective being to deflect a ball towards a large formation of bricks in each round. A life is lost when the player misses the ball and it falls off-screen. Some blocks contain power-up items that can help the player in the stage, such as increasing the width of the paddle, place a barrier at the bottom of the screen to prevent the ball from being lost, and a forcefield that will spit out eight other balls if touched. Some stages contain "killer meteors", which can decrease the paddle's size if touched.

Alongside regular colored bricks, other block types include indestructible bricks, blocks that can speed up and slow down the ball when touched, and "generator blocks" that produce an endless number of red blocks. Some stages are based on other Namco video game characters, including a Galaxian flagship, Pac-Man, and a Rainbow Block from Cutie Q. The 33rd round of the game features a boss fight with a large mechanical fortress named "Breeder", which can be destroyed by deflecting the ball against its large metal shield. Collecting a Special Flag from Rally-X will award the player an extra life.

== Development and release ==
Quester was released in September 1987 by Namco in Japan only. It was produced by Toru Iwatani, known as the creator of Pac-Man, and designed by Shinji Noguchi. It was created to rival the success of Taito's 1986 game Arkanoid, which helped revive the block breaker genre and spark a large amount of competition in arcades. Development of the game was relatively short. The game was dedicated to Shouichi Fukatani, a developer at Namco who died in 1985 and helped create several earlier games for the company, such as Dig Dug. Music for the game was composed by Shinji Hosoe, who had very little contact with the team during development. Shortly after the original game's release, a modified version known as Quester: Special Edition was released, featuring altered level designs that were submitted by readers of Namco Community Magazine NG.

== Reception and legacy ==
Game Machine listed the game on their Quester issue as being the seventeenth most-popular arcade game at the time. Mari Yamakawa of Gamest noted that the game was easier than other similar block breaker games, which made it more accessible for newer players. In a retrospective, Retro Gamer magazine listed it among the best Breakout clones, although would refer to the game's difficulty as "bloody hard" and for not doing anything ambitious with the genre, claiming it was likely the reason for its confinement in Japan.

Hamster Corporation released the game as part of their Arcade Archives series for the Nintendo Switch and PlayStation 4, as well as their Arcade Archives 2 series for the Nintendo Switch 2, PlayStation 5 and Xbox Series X/S in January 2026.
