= Pac-Man 40th Anniversary =

Celebration of video game series

- Anniversary logo, depicting the ghosts as the 4 and Pac-Man as the 0
- Date: May 22, 2020
- Type: Anniversary event
- Organized by: Bandai Namco Entertainment
- Website: pacman.com/en/

The Pac-Man 40th Anniversary was a celebration of the Pac-Man series of video games since the release of the arcade cabinet Pac-Man on May 22, 1980. Bandai Namco celebrated the anniversary through business ventures with video games, events, clothing and other forms of merchandise. The anniversary took place throughout 2020, and ended in early 2021.

== Games ==
=== New ===
Bandai Namco's first game to celebrate the anniversary was Pac-Man Geo, releasing October 14, 2020 on Android and iOS devices. An augmented reality mobile game often compared with 2016 game Pokémon Go as both take advantage of real world maps, the whole idea of the game is to create and play on real world Pac-Man mazes utilising streets displayed on Google Maps. The game was available in 170 different regions. Interestingly a similar concept was developed for Google Maps for April Fools' Day 2017. On October 28, 2021, the game's servers were shut down, rendering the game unplayable.

The next to follow in front of Geo was Pac-Man Mega Tunnel Battle, which released the following month on November 17, exclusively on Google Stadia. The game, developed by Heavy Iron Studios, is a battle royale that pits Pac-Man up against 63 other opponents in a large maze. Each player starts in their own independent mazes that are connected to a network of other mazes with the end goal being the last player standing. A free demo was made available on October 27. Though the original game shut down alongside the closure of the Google Stadia platform, a re-released version of the game under the name Pac-Man Mega Tunnel Battle: Chomp Champs was made available for other consoles on May 9, 2024.

In May 2020, a game called Pac-Man Live Studio was announced and was set to release the following month. It was to be played via Twitch where viewers could play the game from the official Twitch channel. The game would allow two to four player co-op where each player teams up in two modes that are focused on high scores. Despite the game's intended launch windows, no new game updates were provided following the announcement, also missing the launch window. While Bandai Namco's marketing teams clarified that the games were still in development, the official accounts and Twitch pages were taken down in the months following. On December 6, 2021, a game called Pac-Man Community; featuring a great resemblance to Pac-Man Live Studio, was released on Facebook Gaming. Though the Genvid-developed game largely resembled the unreleased Live Studio, Bandai Namco representatives clarified that the two games were different and that Live Studio was still planned to release. Pac-Man Community was shut down on February 4, 2023.

Game company Doppio Games launched a new game for Amazon in November 2020 called Pac-Man Waka Waka. This version of Pac-Man is entirely voice activated where the player must guide Pac-Man through a maze entirely through voice commands.

=== Re-releases ===
In addition to the new games released for the anniversary, Bandai Namco re-released many of their older titles on modern consoles, mainly under the Namco Museum series. The first was the Namco Museum Collection which released on the 40th anniversary exclusively for the Evercade. Uniquely, the compilation added the console versions of the titles, instead of the original arcade versions. The other collection to be released was the Namco Museum Archives known as the Namcot Collection in Japan, which released on June 18, 2020, for the Nintendo Switch, PlayStation 4, Xbox One and PC. The collection was split into two volumes that contained games found on the Nintendo Entertainment System and Famicom, as well as a homebrew version of Gaplus and an 8-bit demake of Pac-Man Championship Edition (2007). (Note: This version of the game was later released separately or as purchase bonus for the Namcot Collection.)

The final re-release for the anniversary was for Pac-Man Championship Edition 2. Through a press release, the game was said to have become completely free to download for PS4, Xbox One and PC users. The offer lasted from April 24 - May 10, 2020. However, none of the same plans were made for the Nintendo Switch version of the game, however the game was put on sale.

=== Machines ===
One of the first items released in 2020 as a part of the anniversary was the Pac-Man Tamagotchi, which was revealed in November 2019 and released on March 15 2020. What makes the Tamagotchi unique besides the yellow or black exterior is the appearance of Pac-Man elements in it, such as different minigames and animation inspired by the arcade game.

Multiple different companies created arcade cabinets to celebrate the anniversary. The first were miniature quarter inch versions of Pac-Man and Ms. Pac-Man in July made by Numskull. The two were released as "Collector Editions" so only 10,000 units were made. Another company was Arcade1UP, who only release one arcade cabinet. In July, they released a special edition cabinet that could play the original version along with Pac-Man Plus, Super Pac-Man, Pac & Pal, Pac-Land and Pac-Mania alongside Galaga. Micro Arcade converted Pac-Man into one of their mini arcade series consoles. Finally, Super Impulse released two different versions of Pac-man under their "Tiny Arcade" line-up, one as a tabletop and the other as a cabinet. The final miniature arcade machines released for the anniversary were released by My Arcade which released in the summer. The cabinet features a gold stick and buttons.

== Merchandise ==
Throughout the anniversary, Bandai Namco released plenty of Pac-Man-themed merchandise alongside the celebration, typically collaborating with other brands. The types of merchandise ranged from toys, clothing, and memorabilia releasing across all of 2020.

=== Clothing ===
Clothing became the biggest form of merchandise for the anniversary celebration, with partnerships with multiple different brands. The celebration began with the introduction of a wide range of backpacks, suitcases and pouches themed after Pac-Man by Belgian brand Kipling releasing in the beginning of the year. Other brands of clothing includes Champion and American streetwear brand BAIT. In August 2020, a recently introduced German shoe brand called VIER released a launch collection called "The Arcade Line" which included a pair of shoes detailed with a Pac-man maze. Another shoe brand to collaborate for the anniversary was Puma who released a Pac-man themed pair of sneakers. One of the most recognisable branding appeals for the anniversary was special edition memorial blouson plastered with the phrase “Coffee Breakers Since 1980” which was released by Bandai Namco on September 3, 2020. It is a replica of Ken Ishii's jacket from the "Join the Pac" music video. Along with the arcade cabinet, Numskull also released pairs of anniversary socks.

=== Other ===
One of the big pieces of merchandise to release was the collaborative project between Hasbro and Bandai Namco, a Pac-Man themed Monopoly board game. Releasing on August 1, 2020, the game utilises a miniature arcade cabinet to play Pac-Man which has a number of uses. Neomedia released a line of Pac-Man figurines in a variety of shapes and sizes to celebrate the anniversary. For the Bandai Namco store, they released a mystery box filled with different Pac-Man themed items. They were released on December 1 in limited supply. In Japan, 5 metallic bottles of Junmai-shu flavoured Sake each representing Pac-Man and the ghosts released to various liquor-based stores on July 4, 2020. Bandai released a model kit of Pac-Man under their Entry Grade series. During ComplexCon in November 2019, it was revealed that the Timex Group would release a special edition version of their T80 digital watches which was plastered with Pac-Man attire in July and August 2020. They were released in two colours, silver and gold. Both Numskull and Pinfinity released a set of pins, with Pinfinity's fitted with AR capabilities. One of the last partnerships was in November 2020, participants could sign up to receive one of six limited edition payment cards from Czech Republic bank KB.

== Music ==
Bandai Namco commissioned Japanese techno musician Ken Ishii to create an official theme song for the anniversary, which was titled "Join the Pac", which is also the slogan for the anniversary. This song was featured on an album of the same name, which released on October 28, 2020. (Note: The song originally was meant to come out on vinyl earlier in the year, but due to the COVID-19 pandemic the release was delayed till late August.) The album, released as a joint venture between Bandai Namco and Iam8bit, contained two volumes. The first was a compilation of songs from different Japanese artists who remixed Pac-Man sound effects; the second compiles a list of music and sound effects from different Pac-Man games.

In addition, other artists created songs to commemorate the arcade game. One of the largest songs that celebrated the anniversary was composed by British virtual band Gorillaz aptly named "PAC-MAN". The song was made for their seventh studio album and featured American rapper Schoolboy Q. The song, which released in July 2020, managed to appear on the New Zealand Hot Singles, where the song peaked at 30.

== Events ==
One of the biggest collaborations for the celebration was the addition of the Pac-Man texture pack in Minecraft. The texture pack introduced a new map, minigame and enemy in the form of a green ghost that resembles a Creeper. In addition, Tekken 7 introduced a Pac-Man themed stage and items as part of DLC 16 for the game on November 10, 2020, featuring the songs, "Pac Twin Attack" and "Pac Sky Emotion" from Pac-Man Championship Edition 2 Plus.

Other companies celebrated the anniversaries by creating variations of the original arcade game. Google reintroduced the Pac-Man Google Doodle that was used for the 30th anniversary in 2010. Japanese candy manufacture Morinaga & Company created a variation where the power pellets where replaced with their Hi-Chew candy. In May, NVidia revealed that they created the entire game of Pac-Man solely using AI. Construction corporation Caterpillar Inc. set up a giant game of Pac-Man using over 6,880 yards of dirt and five excavator.

Due to COVID-19 lockdowns, Namco partnered with Giants Enterprises to create a virtual challenge to keep people healthy and fit, allowing said participants to earn rewards. As part of the anniversary, San Diego Comic-Con announced in November 2020 that they will be inducting Pac-Man into the Comic-Con Museum "Video Game Character Hall of Fame."

== See also ==
- Super Mario Bros. 35th Anniversary
