= QTS =

QTS may refer to:

- Qualified Teacher Status, England and Wales
- Quality Technology Services, an Internet data center provider
- Quileute Tribal School, Washington, United States

== See also ==
- QT (disambiguation)
