= QT =

QT or Qt may refer to:

== Businesses ==
- Qt Group, a Finnish software developer
- QT Hotels & Resorts, an Australasian hospitality provider
- QT Inc., an American bracelet manufacturer
- QuikTrip, an American convenience store chain

== People ==
- QT (musician) (born 1988), American pop singer
- QTCinderella (born 1994), American Twitch streamer and YouTuber
- Q-Tee, British rapper (active in the 1990s)
- Quentin Tarantino (born 1963), American filmmaker

== Science and technology ==
=== Computer software ===
- Qt (software), a cross-platform application framework
  - Qt Project, effort to coordinate the development of the Qt framework
- QuickTime, a multimedia technology from Apple Inc.

=== Heart medicine ===
- QT interval, on an electrocardiogram

=== Units of measure ===
- Quart (qt), an imperial unit of volume

== Television shows ==
- QT: QueerTelevision, a 1990s Canadian LGBT newsmagazine
- Question Time (TV programme), a British panel debate (first aired 1979)

== Transport ==
- QT (New York City Subway service), a defunct rapid-transit service
- Quiet Trader, cargo versions of the BAe 146 airliner

== Other uses ==
- Quality time, periods proactively spent with one's loved ones
- Quantitative tightening, a contractionary monetary policy from a central bank

== See also ==
- Cutie (disambiguation)
- QTS (disambiguation)
