= Kute =

Kute may refer to:

== Places ==
- Kutë, a municipality in Albania
- Kute (Gornji Vakuf), a village in Bosnia and Herzegovina
- Kute, Kupres, a village in Bosnia and Herzegovina
- Kute, Prozor, a village in Bosnia and Herzegovina
- Kute Station, a passenger railway station in Ōda, Shimane Prefecture, Japan

== Other uses ==
- KUTE, a simulcast of KSUT's National Public Radio-affiliated station in Ignacio, Colorado
- KUTE, Los Angeles radio station that became KSCA
- "Kute", a song by Alex G from Trick

== See also ==
- Cute (disambiguation)
