= Cute (disambiguation) =

The word cute is usually associated with the concept of cuteness, a form of attractiveness associated with youthful traits.

Cute may also refer to:

== Music ==
- Cute (Japanese idol group), a Japanese idol girl group
- Cute (Maltese band), Malta's Junior Eurovision Song Contest 2007 entry
- Cute (album), by Arisa Mizuki
- "Cute", a song by Neal Hefti, popularized by Count Basie
- "Cute (I'm Not Cute)", a song by Blog 27
- "Cute", a song by Jerry Goldsmith from the Gremlins 2: The New Batch soundtrack

== Abbreviations and acronyms ==
- Copper(II) telluride, a chemical compound with the formula CuTe
- Qt (software), an application framework commonly pronounced cute
- CUTE-1.7 + APD, an amateur radio satellite operated by the Tokyo Institute of Technology
  - CUTE-1.7 + APD II
- Colorado Ultraviolet Transit Experiment, a space telescope
- China University of Technology, a private university in Taipei, Taiwan

== See also ==
- Cutie (disambiguation)
- Kute (disambiguation)
