= Pac-Man =

1980 video game

- North American arcade flyer
- Developer: Namco
- Publishers: JP/DE: Namco; NA/FRA: Midway Manufacturing
- Designer: Toru Iwatani
- Programmers: Shigeo Funaki; Shigeichi Ishimura
- Artist: Hiroshi Ono
- Composers: Shigeichi Ishimura; Toshio Kai
- Series: Pac-Man
- Platform: Arcade: Atari 2600, Atari 5200, Apple II, Atari 8-bit, MSX, NES, Commodore 64, VIC-20, Intellivision, ZX Spectrum, TI-99/4A, IBM PC, Game Boy, Game Gear, Game Boy Color, Neo Geo Pocket Color, Mobile phone, Game Boy Advance, iPod Touch, Xbox 360, PlayStation 4, Xbox One, iOS, Android, Nex Playground
- Release: JP: May 22, 1980; US: October 1980
- Genre: Maze
- Modes: Single-player, multiplayer

Pac-Man, originally titled Puck Man (Note: Japanese: パックマン, Hepburn: Pakkuman) in Japan, is a 1980 maze video game developed and published by Namco for arcades. It was released in Japan on May 22, 1980 and by Midway Manufacturing in North America in October 1980. The player controls Pac-Man, who must eat all the dots inside an enclosed maze while avoiding four colored ghosts. Eating large flashing dots called "Power Pellets" causes the ghosts to temporarily turn blue and vulnerable, allowing Pac-Man to eat the ghosts for bonus points.

Pac-Man was designed by Toru Iwatani, who led a nine-man team; the game's development began in early 1979. Iwatani wanted to create a game that could appeal to women as well as men, because most video games of the time had themes that appealed to traditionally masculine interests, such as war or sports. Although the inspiration for the Pac-Man character was the image of a pizza with a slice removed, Iwatani has said he rounded out the Japanese character for mouth, kuchi (Japanese: 口). The in-game characters were made to be cute and colorful to appeal to younger players. The original Japanese title of Puck Man was derived from the Japanese phrase paku paku taberu, which refers to gobbling something up; the title was changed to Pac-Man for the North American release due to fears of vandals defacing cabinets by converting the P into an F, as in fuck.

Pac-Man is regarded as one of the most influential and greatest video games of all time. It was a widespread critical and commercial success, leading to several sequels, extensive merchandise, and two television series, as well as a hit single, "Pac-Man Fever", by Buckner & Garcia. The character of Pac-Man became the official mascot of Namco and later Bandai Namco Entertainment. The game remains one of the highest-grossing and best-selling video games, generating more than $14 billion in revenue (as of 2016) and 43 million units in combined sales, and retains an enduring commercial and cultural legacy.

== Gameplay ==
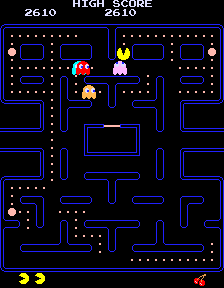
In-game screenshot. The ghosts are chasing Pac-Man. At bottom left is the player's life count, and at bottom right the level icon (in this case a cherry). At top is the player's score.

Pac-Man is an action maze chase video game; the player controls the eponymous character through an enclosed maze. The objective of the game is to eat all of the dots placed in the maze while avoiding four colored ghosts—Blinky (red), Pinky (pink), Inky (cyan), and Clyde (orange)—who pursue Pac-Man. When Pac-Man eats all of the dots, the player advances to the next level. Levels are indicated by fruit icons at the bottom of the screen. In between levels are short cutscenes featuring Pac-Man and Blinky in humorous, comical situations.

If Pac-Man is caught by a ghost, he loses a life; the game ends when all lives are lost. Each of the four ghosts has its own unique artificial intelligence (A.I.), or "personality": Blinky gives direct chase to Pac-Man; Pinky and Inky try to position themselves in front of Pac-Man, usually by cornering him; and Clyde switches between chasing and fleeing from Pac-Man depending on his distance from him.

Placed near the four corners of the maze are large flashing "energizers" or "power pellets". When Pac-Man eats one, the ghosts turn blue with a dizzied expression and reverse direction. Pac-Man can eat blue ghosts for bonus points; when a ghost is eaten, its eyes make their way back to the center box in the maze, where the ghost "regenerates" and resumes its normal activity. Eating multiple blue ghosts in succession increases their point value. After a certain amount of time, blue-colored ghosts flash white before turning back into their normal forms. Eating a certain number of dots in a level causes a bonus item—usually a fruit—to appear underneath the center box; the item can be eaten for bonus points. To the sides of the maze are two "warp tunnels", which allow Pac-Man and the ghosts to travel to the opposite side of the screen. Ghosts become slower when entering and exiting these tunnels.

The game increases in difficulty as the player progresses: the ghosts become faster, and the energizers' effect decreases in duration, eventually disappearing entirely. An integer overflow causes the 256th level to load improperly, rendering it impossible to complete. This is known as a kill screen.

== Development ==
After acquiring the struggling Japanese division of Atari in 1974, Namco began producing its own video games in-house rather than licensing them from other developers to distribute in Japan. Company president Masaya Nakamura created a small video-game development group within the company that studied several NEC-produced microcomputers for their potential for creating games. Among the first people assigned to the division was 24-year-old employee Toru Iwatani. He created Namco's first video game Gee Bee in 1978, which, while unsuccessful, helped the company gain a stronger foothold in the quickly growing video-game industry. He assisted in the production of two sequels, Bomb Bee and Cutie Q, both released in 1979.

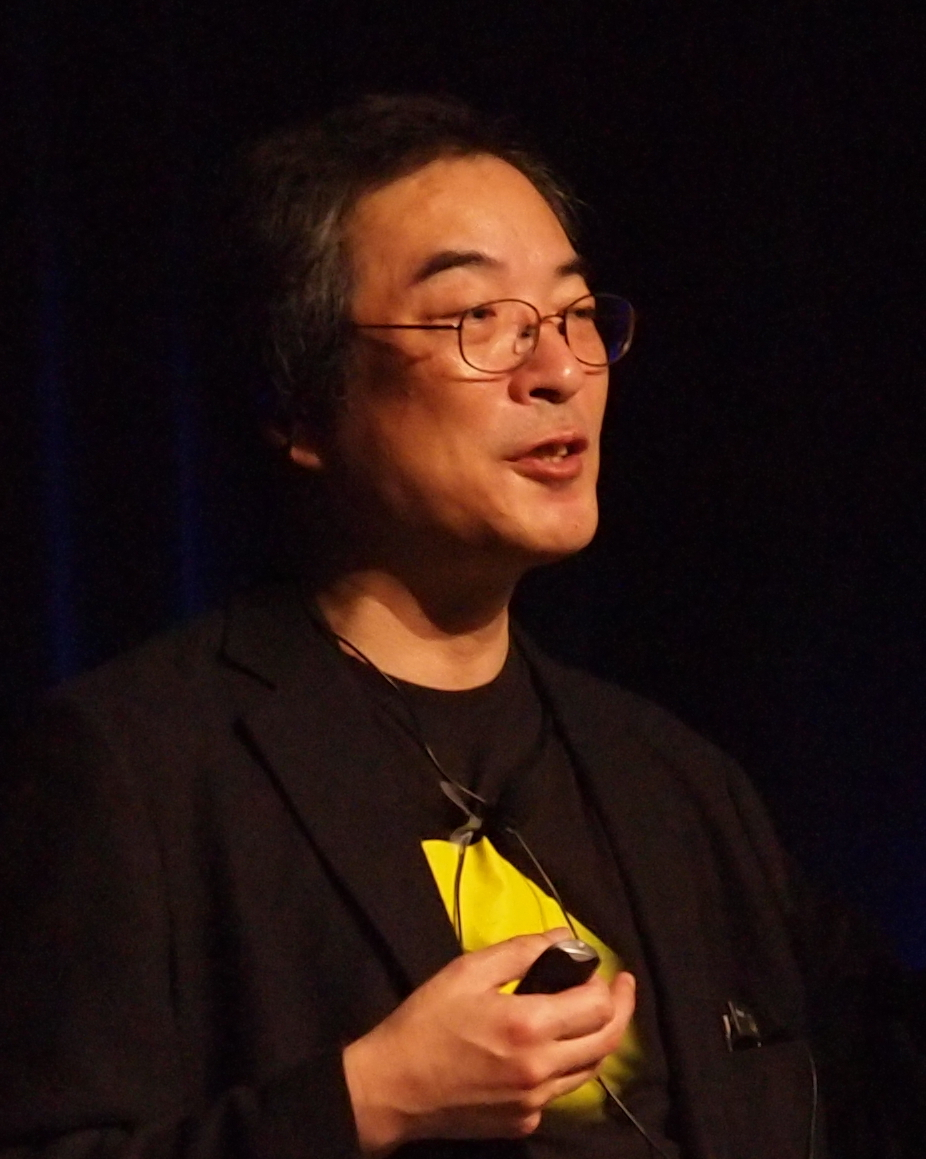
Creator of Pac-Man, Toru Iwatani, at the 2011 Game Developers Conference

The Japanese video-game industry had surged in popularity with games such as Space Invaders and Breakout, and the market became flooded with similar titles. Iwatani felt that the crude graphics and violence of arcade games limited their appeal to men only and that arcades were seen as seedy environments. For his next project, Iwatani chose to create a nonviolent, cheerful game that appealed mostly to women, as he believed that attracting women and couples into arcades would create a more family-friendly atmosphere. Iwatani considered women's most frequent activities and then decided to center his game around eating, feeling that women like to eat sweets. His game was initially titled Pakkuman, based on the Japanese onomatopoeia term "paku paku taberu", referencing the mouth movement of opening and closing in succession.

The game that later became Pac-Man began development in early 1979 and took one year and five months to complete, the longest for any video game to that date. Iwatani enlisted the help of nine other Namco employees to assist in production, including composer Toshio Kai, programmer Shigeo Funaki and hardware engineer Shigeichi Ishimura. To appeal to a broad audience including women, Iwatani opted for simple gameplay and cute, attractive character designs. While the game was being developed, Namco was also designing Galaxian, which employed a revolutionary RGB color display, allowing sprites to display several colors simultaneously and obviating the need for colored strips of cellophane that had become commonplace. This technological accomplishment allowed Iwatani to greatly enhance his game with bright pastel colors, which he felt would help attract players. The idea for energizers was a concept that Iwatani borrowed from Popeye, a cartoon character who temporarily acquires superhuman strength after eating spinach. It is believed that Iwatani was partly inspired by a Japanese children's story about a creature that protects children from monsters by devouring them. Frank Fogleman, the cofounder of Gremlin Industries, believes that the maze-chase gameplay of Pac-Man was inspired by Sega's Head On (1979), a similar arcade game that was popular in Japan.

Iwatani has often claimed that the character of Pac-Man was inspired by the shape of a pizza with a missing slice that he observed at lunch, but in a 1986 interview, he said that this was only partially true and that the character's appearance was also the result of rounding and simplifying the Japanese character "kuchi" (口), meaning "mouth". The four ghosts were designed as cute, colorful and appealing, using bright, pastel colors and expressive blue eyes. Iwatani had used this idea in the development of Cutie Q, which features similar ghost-like characters. He was inspired by the television series Casper the Friendly Ghost and the manga series Obake no Q-Taro.

Ghosts were chosen as the game's main antagonists because they often appeared as villainous characters in animation. The idea for the fruit bonuses was based on graphics displayed on slot machines. Namco president Masaya Nakamura had originally requested that all of the ghosts be colored red and appear indistinguishable from one another. Iwatani believed that the ghosts should appear in different colors, and his colleagues unanimously supported his idea. The ghosts were programmed to display their own distinct personalities in order to prevent the game from becoming too boring or impossibly difficult to play. Each ghost's name provides a hint to its strategy for chasing Pac-Man: Shadow ("Blinky") always chases Pac-Man, Speedy ("Pinky") tries to get ahead of him, Bashful ("Inky") uses a more complicated strategy and Pokey ("Clyde") alternates between chasing and escaping. The ghosts' Japanese names are おいかけ, chase; まちぶせ, ambush; きまぐれ, fickle; and おとぼけ, playing dumb, respectively.

To alleviate the tension of constant pursuit, humorous intermissions between Pac-Man and Blinky were added. The sound effects were among the last features added to the game, created by Toshio Kai. In a design session, Iwatani noisily ate fruit and emitted gurgling noises to describe to Kai how he wanted the eating effect to sound. Upon completion, the game was titled Puck Man.

== Release ==
Location testing for Puck Man began on May 22, 1980 in Shibuya, Tokyo. Non-gamers responded well to it, finding it easy to learn, while many arcade regulars were unimpressed. A private showing for the game was held in June, followed by a nationwide release in July. Eyeing the game's success in Japan, Namco initiated plans to bring the game to the international market, particularly the United States. Before showing the game to distributors, Namco America implemented several changes, such as changing the ghosts' names. The game's title was also changed because Namco executives worried that vandals would change the "P" in Puck Man to an "F". Masaya Nakamura chose to rename the game Pac-Man, which he felt was closer to the original Japanese title of Pakkuman. In Europe, the game was released under both titles. After the Puck Man title was abandoned but before Pac-Man was selected, early American promotional material used the name Snapper.

When Namco presented Pac-Man and Rally-X to potential distributors at the 1980 AMOA tradeshow in November 1980, executives believed that Rally-X would become the best-selling game of the year. According to Play Meter magazine, both Pac-Man and Rally-X received mild attention at the show. Namco had initially approached Atari to distribute Pac-Man, but Atari refused the offer. Midway Manufacturing subsequently agreed to distribute both Pac-Man and Rally-X in North America, announcing their acquisition of the manufacturing rights on November 22 and releasing the games in December.

== Ports ==
Pac-Man was ported to several home video-game systems and personal computers. The most infamous of these is the 1982 Atari 2600 conversion designed by Tod Frye and published by Atari, Inc. This version of the game was widely criticized for its inaccurate recreation of the arcade version and for its peculiar design choices, especially the flickering effect of the ghosts. However, it was a commercial success, selling over seven million copies. Atari released versions for the Intellivision, VIC-20, Commodore 64, Apple II, IBM PC compatibles, TI-99/4A, ZX Spectrum and the Atari 8-bit computers. A port for the Atari 5200 was released in 1983, a version that is considered as a significant improvement over the Atari 2600 version.

Namco released a version for the Family Computer in 1984 as one of the console's first third-party titles, as well as a port for the MSX computer. The Famicom version was later released in North America for the Nintendo Entertainment System by Tengen, a subsidiary of Atari Games. Tengen produced an unlicensed version of the game in a black cartridge shell, released during a time when Tengen and Nintendo were in disagreements over the latter's stance on quality control for its consoles; this version was re-released by Namco as an official title in 1993, featuring a new cartridge label and box. The Famicom version was released for the Famicom Disk System in 1990 as a budget title for the Disk Writer kiosks in retail stores. The same year, Namco released a port of Pac-Man for the Game Boy, which allowed for two-player co-operative play via the Game Link Cable peripheral. A version for the Game Gear was released a year later, which likewise enabled support for multiplayer. In celebration of the game's 20th anniversary in 1999, Namco re-released the Game Boy version for the Game Boy Color, bundled with Pac-Attack and titled Pac-Man: Special Color Edition. The same year, Namco and SNK co-published a port for the Neo Geo Pocket Color, which came with a circular "Cross Ring" that attached to the d-pad to restrict it to four-directional movement.

In 2001, Namco released a port of Pac-Man for various Japanese mobile phones, being one of the company's first mobile game releases. The Famicom version of the game was re-released for the Game Boy Advance in 2004 as part of the Famicom Mini series, released to commemorate the 25th anniversary of the Famicom; this version was released in North America and Europe under the Classic NES Series label. Namco Networks released Pac-Man for BREW mobile devices in 2005. The arcade original was released for the Xbox Live Arcade service in 2006, featuring achievements and online leaderboards. In 2009 a version for iOS devices was published; this release was rebranded as Pac-Man + Tournaments in 2013, featuring new mazes and leaderboards. The NES version was released for the Wii's Virtual Console in 2007, while the Game Boy version was released for the Nintendo 3DS' Virtual Console in 2011. A Roku version was released in 2011. Pac-Man was one of four titles released under the Arcade Game Series brand, which was released for the PlayStation 4, Windows and Xbox One in 2016. Hamster Corporation released the arcade version of Pac-Man (alongside Xevious) as part of their Arcade Archives series for the Nintendo Switch in September 2021 and PlayStation 4 in October 2021, marking the first of two Namco games to be included as part of the series. A version of Pac-Man with motion control gameplay was released on the Nex Playground in September 2026.

Pac-Man is included in many Namco compilations, including Namco Museum Vol. 1 (1995), Namco Museum 64 (1999), Namco Museum Battle Collection (2005), Namco Museum DS (2007), Namco Museum Essentials (2009), and Namco Museum Megamix (2010). In 1996, it was re-released for arcades as part of Namco Classic Collection Vol. 2, alongside Dig Dug, Rally-X and special "Arrangement" remakes of all three titles. Microsoft included Pac-Man in Microsoft Return of Arcade (1995) as a way to help attract video game companies to its Windows 95 operating system. Namco released the game in the third volume of Namco History in Japan in 1998. The 2001 Game Boy Advance compilation Pac-Man Collection compiles Pac-Man, Pac-Mania, Pac-Attack and Pac-Man Arrangement onto one cartridge. Pac-Man is a hidden extra in the arcade game Ms. Pac-Man/Galaga - Class of 1981 (2001). A similar cabinet was released in 2005 that featured Pac-Man as the centerpiece. Pac-Man 2: The New Adventures (1993) and Pac-Man World 2 (2002) have Pac-Man as an unlockable extra. Alongside the Xbox 360 remake Pac-Man Championship Edition, it was ported to the Nintendo 3DS in 2012 as part of Pac-Man & Galaga Dimensions. The 2010 Wii game Pac-Man Party and its 2011 3DS remake include Pac-Man as a bonus game, alongside the arcade versions of Dig Dug and Galaga. In 2014, Pac-Man was included in the compilation title Pac-Man Museum for the Xbox 360, PlayStation 3 and PC, alongside several other Pac-Man games. The NES version is one of 30 games included in the NES Classic Edition. The NES version was also added to the Nintendo Classics library on April 9, 2026.

== Reception ==
Reception

Review scores
Publication	Score
AllGame	5/5 (Arcade); 4/5 (NES)
Computer and Video Games	9/10 (Atari 400/800)
Eurogamer	10/10 (Virtual Console)
IGN	7/10 (Neo Geo Pocket)
Computer Games	Classic (computers); Positive (IBM PC)
Mean Machines	80% (Game Boy)
Popular Computing Weekly	4/5 (VIC-20)

Awards
Publication	Award
Arcade Awards (1981)	Best Commercial Arcade Game
Video Software Dealers Association (VSDA)	Best Videogame
Dixons (2001)	Greatest Video Game
Killer List of Videogames	Most Popular Game

Upon its North American debut at AMOA 1980, the game initially received a mild response. Play Meter magazine previewed the game and called it "a cute game which appears to grow on players, something which cute games are not prone to do", saying that there's "more to the game than at first appears" but criticized the sound as a drawback, saying it is "good for awhile, then becomes annoying". Upon release, the game exceeded expectations with wide critical and commercial success. Contemporary arcade coverage reflected the game´s standing; the July 1982 issue of Electronic Games described Pac-Man as one of the top trackball-spinning arcaders, ahead of Tempest.

Reviewing home console versions in 1982, Games magazine called the Atari 5200 implementation a "splendidly reproduced" version of the arcade game, noting a difference in maze layouts for the television screen. It considered the Atari 2600 version to have "much weaker graphics", but to still be one of the best games for that console. In both cases the reviewer felt that the joystick controls were harder to use than those of the arcade machine, and that "attempts to make quick turns are often frustrated".

=== Commercial performance ===
When it was first released in Japan, Pac-Man was initially only a modest success; Namco's own Galaxian (1979) had quickly outdone the game in popularity because its predominately male player base was familiar with its shooting gameplay as opposed to Pac-Man's cute characters and maze-chase theme. Pac-Man eventually became very successful in Japan, where it went on to be Japan's highest-grossing arcade game of 1980 according to the annual Game Machine charts, dethroning Taito's Space Invaders (1978) which had topped the annual charts for two years in a row and leading to a shift in the Japanese market away from space shooters towards action games featuring comical characters. Pac-Man was Japan's fourth highest-grossing arcade game of 1981.

In North America, Midway had limited expectations prior to release, initially manufacturing 5,000 units for the US, before it caught on upon release there. Some arcades purchased entire rows of Pac-Man cabinets. It became a nationwide success. Upon release in 1980, it was earning about $8.1 million per week in the United States. Within one year, more than 100,000 arcade units had been sold which grossed more than $1 billion in quarters. It overtook Atari's Asteroids (1979) as the best-selling arcade game in the country, and surpassed the film Star Wars (1977) with more than $1 billion in revenue. Pac-Man was the United States' highest-grossing arcade game of 1981, and second highest game of 1982. By 1982, it was estimated to have had 30 million active players across the United States; Pac-Man was so compelling that a player in San Francisco reportedly shot someone for interrupting him during play. The game's success was partly driven by its popularity among female audiences, becoming "the first commercial videogame to involve large numbers of women as players" according to Midway's Stan Jarocki, with Pac-Man being the favorite coin-op game among female gamers through 1982. Among the nine arcade games covered by How to Win Video Games (1982), Pac-Man was the only one with females accounting for a majority of players.

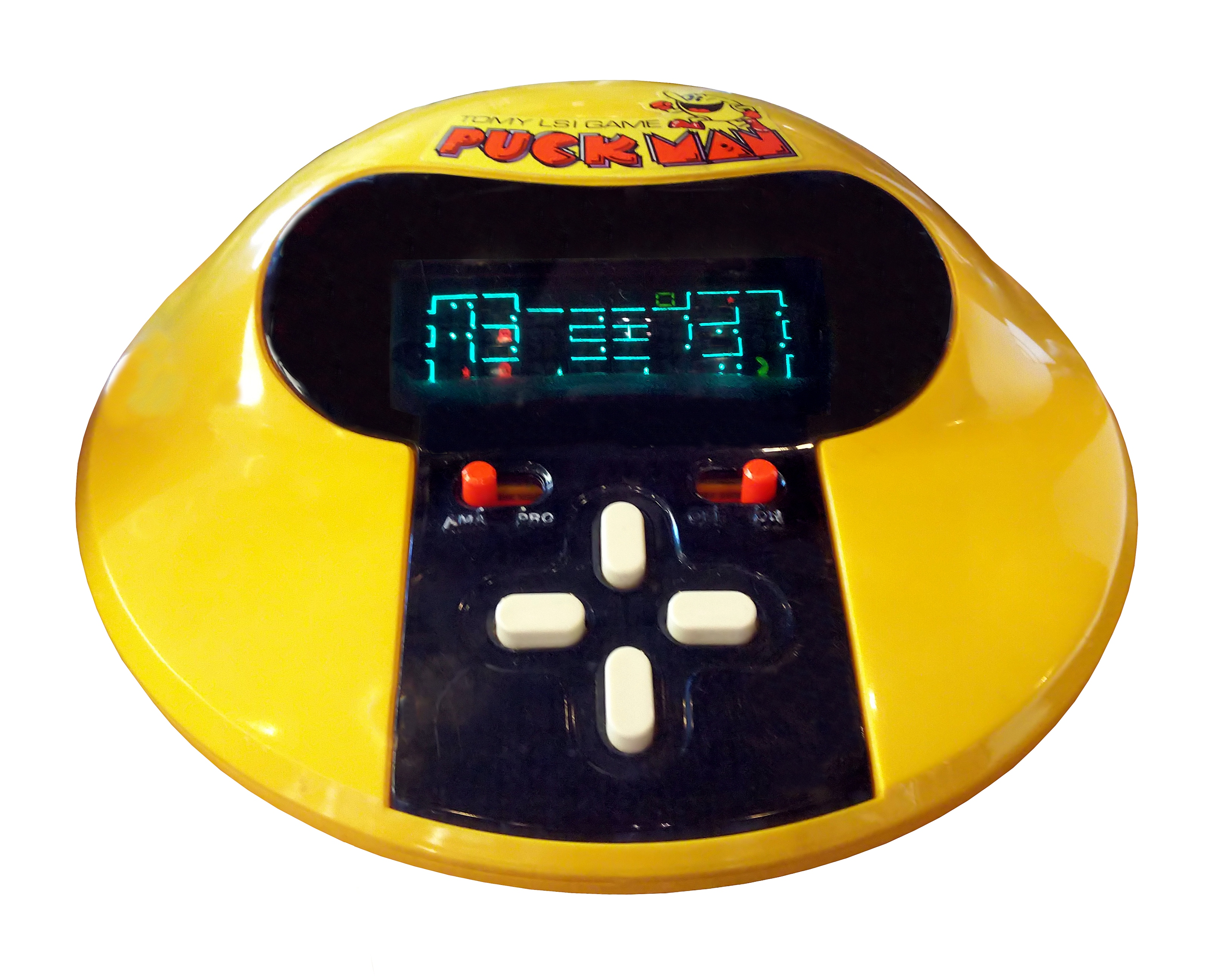
Portable version (Handheld electronic game) by Japanese company Tomy

The number of arcade units sold had tripled to 400,000 by 1982, receiving an estimated total of between seven billion coins and $6 billion. In a 1983 interview, Nakamura said that though he did expect Pac-Man to be successful, "I never thought it would be this big." Pac-Man is the best-selling arcade game of all time, with total estimated earnings ranging from 10 billion coins and $3.5 billion ($7.7 billion adjusted for inflation) to $6 billion ($20 billion adjusted for inflation) in arcades. Pac-Man and Ms. Pac-Man also topped the US RePlay cocktail arcade cabinet charts for 23 months, from February 1982 through 1983 up until February 1984.

The Atari 2600 version of the game sold over 8 million copies, (Note: 7,271,844 in 1982. 684,569 in 1983. 37,063 in 1986. 61,685 in 1987. 3,885 in 1988. 34,374 in 1989. 2,166 in 1990.) making it the console's best-selling title. In addition, Coleco's tabletop mini-arcade unit sold over 1.5 million units in 1982, the Pac-Man Nelsonic Game Watch sold more than 500,000 units the same year, the Family Computer (Famicom) version and its 2004 Game Boy Advance re-release sold a combined 598,000 copies in Japan, the Atari 5200 version sold 35,011 cartridges between 1986 and 1988, the Atari 8-bit computer version sold 42,359 copies in 1986 and 1990, Thunder Mountain's 1986 budget release for home computers received a Diamond certification from the Software Publishers Association in 1989 for selling over 500,000 copies, and mobile phone ports have sold over 30 million paid downloads as of 2010. II Computing also listed the Atarisoft port tenth on the magazine's list of top Apple II games as of late 1985, based on sales and market-share data. As of 2016, all versions of Pac-Man are estimated to have grossed a total of more than $12 billion in revenue.

=== Accolades ===
Pac-Man was awarded "Best Commercial Arcade Game" at the 1982 Arcade Awards. Pac-Man also won the Video Software Dealers Association's VSDA Award for Best Videogame. In 2001, Pac-Man was voted the greatest video game of all time by a Dixons poll in the UK. The Killer List of Videogames listed Pac-Man as the most popular game of all time. The list aggregator site Playthatgame currently ranks Pac-Man as the #53rd top game of all-time & game of the year.

=== Impact ===
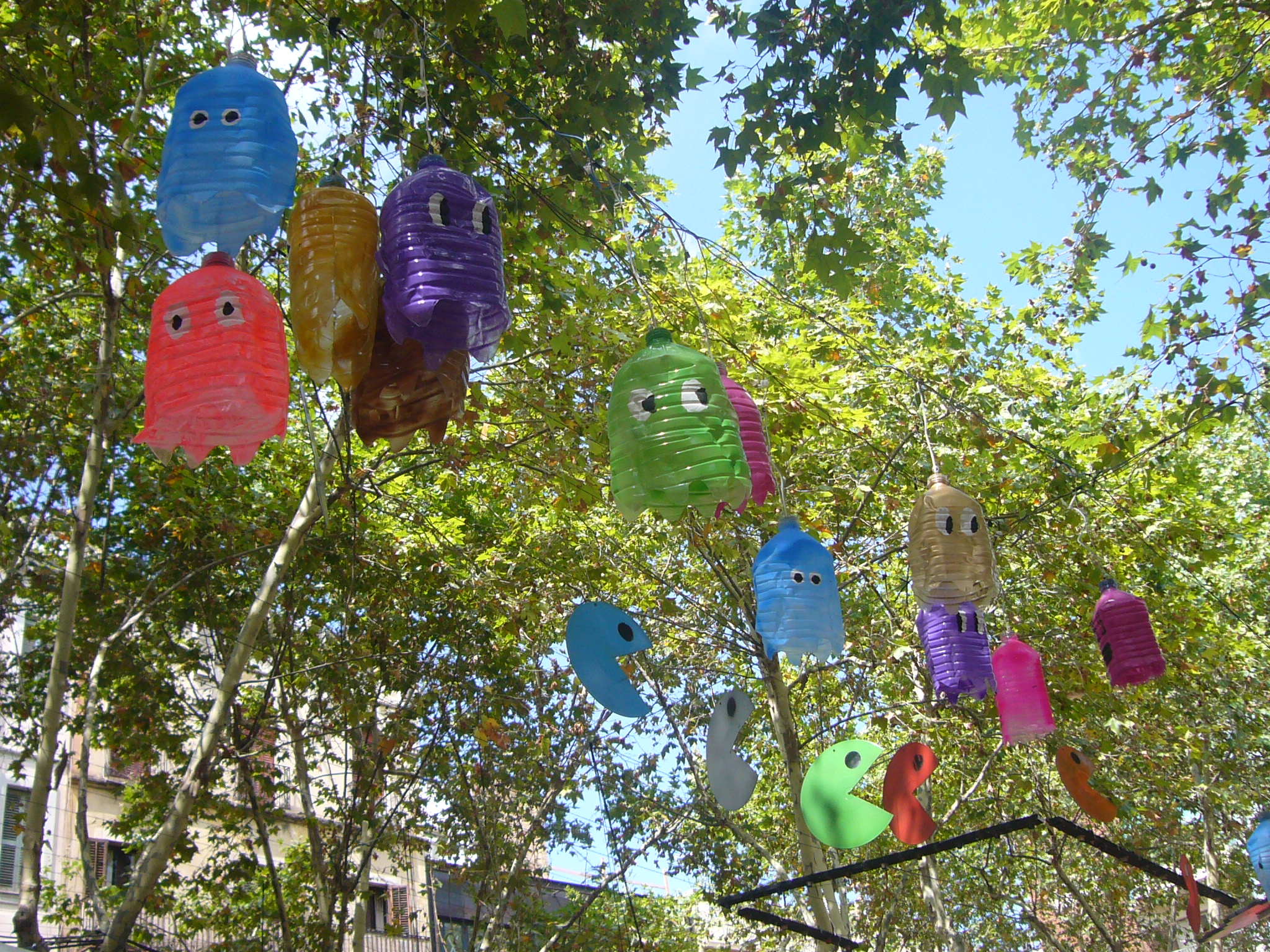
Pac-Man characters as street decorations in Barcelona, Spain

Pac-Man is considered by many to be one of the most influential video games of all time. The game established the maze video game genre, was the first video game to make use of power-ups, and the individual ghosts have deterministic artificial intelligence (AI) that reacts to player actions. Pac-Man is considered one of the first video games to have demonstrated the potential of player characters in the medium; its title character was the first original gaming mascot, it increased the appeal of video games with female audiences, and it was gaming's first broad licensing success. It is often cited as the first game with cutscenes (in the form of brief comical interludes about Pac-Man and Blinky chasing each other), though actually Space Invaders Part II employed a similar style of between-level intermissions in 1979.

Pac-Man was a turning point for the arcade video game industry, which had previously been dominated by space shoot 'em ups since Space Invaders (1978). Pac-Man popularized a genre of "character-led" action games, leading to a wave of character action games involving player characters in 1981, such as Nintendo's Donkey Kong, Konami's Frogger and Universal Entertainment's Lady Bug. Pac-Man was one of the first popular non-shooting action games, defining key elements of the genre such as "parallel visual processing" which requires simultaneously keeping track of multiple entities, including the player's location, the enemies, and the energizers.

Maze games became popular on home computers after the release of Pac-Man. Some of them appeared before official ports and garnered more attention from consumers, and sometimes lawyers, as a result. These include Taxman (1981) and Snack Attack (1982) for the Apple II, Jawbreaker (1981) for the Atari 8-bit computers, Scarfman (1981) for the TRS-80, and K.C. Munchkin! (1981) for the Odyssey². Namco produced several other maze games, including Rally-X (1980), Dig Dug (1982), Exvania (1992), and Tinkle Pit (1994). Atari sued Philips for creating K.C. Munchkin in the case Atari, Inc. v. North American Philips Consumer Electronics Corp., leading to Munchkin being pulled from store shelves under court order. No major competitors emerged to challenge Pac-Man in the maze subgenre.

Pac-Man inspired 3D variants of the concept, such as Monster Maze (1982), Spectre (1982), and early first-person shooters such as MIDI Maze (1987; which had similar character designs). John Romero credited Pac-Man as the game that had the biggest influence on his career; Wolfenstein 3D includes a Pac-Man level from a first-person perspective. Many post-Pac-Man titles include power-ups that briefly turn the tables on the enemy. The game's artificial intelligence inspired programmers who later worked for companies like Bethesda.

== Legacy ==
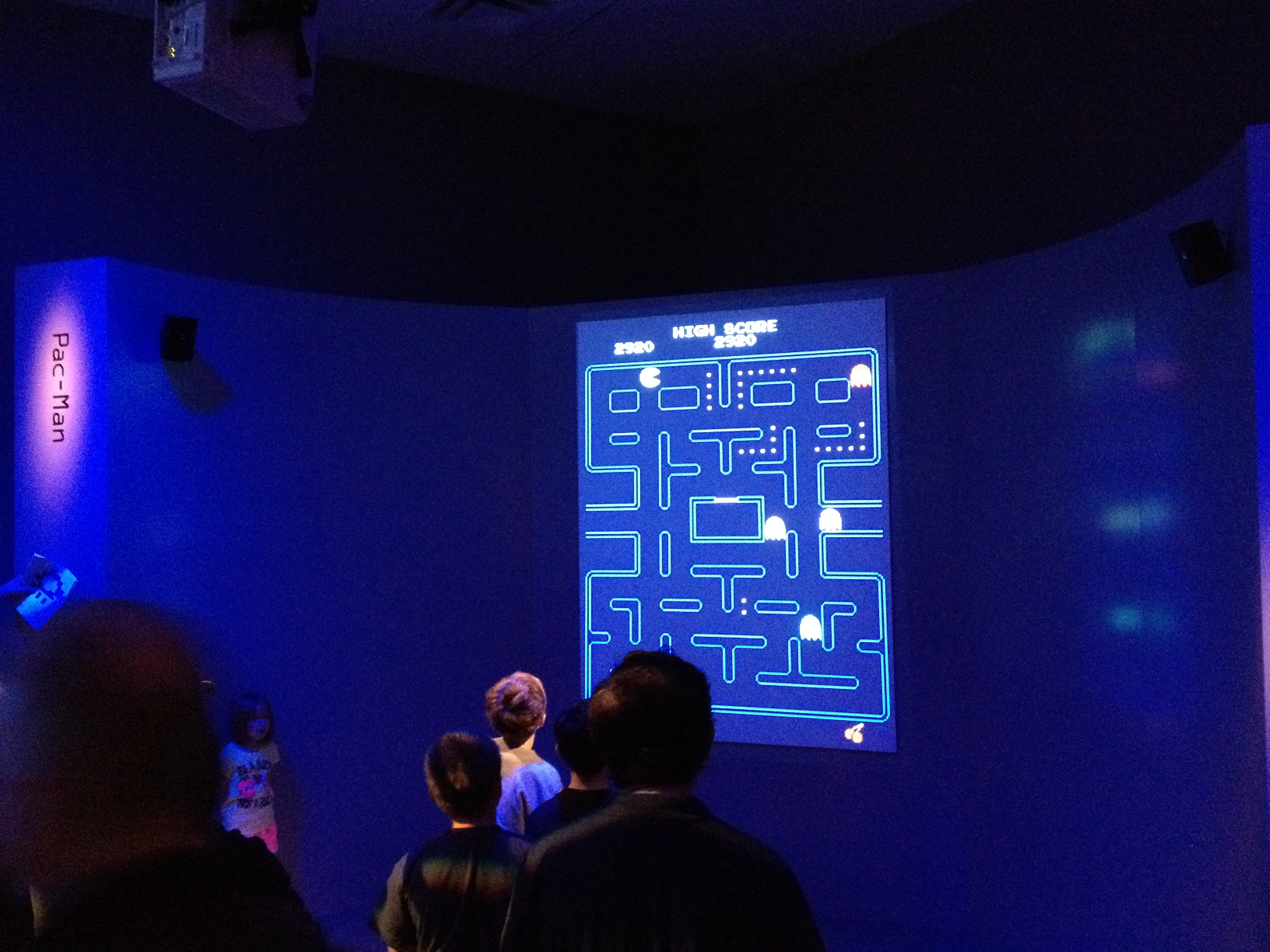
Pac-Man interactive exposition at The Art of Video Games

Guinness World Records has awarded the Pac-Man series eight records in Guinness World Records: Gamer's Edition 2008, including "Most Successful Coin-Operated Game". On June 3, 2010, at the NLGD Festival of Games, the game's creator, Toru Iwatani, officially received the certificate from Guinness World Records for Pac-Man having had the most "coin-operated arcade machines" installed worldwide: 293,822. The record was set and recognized in 2005 and mentioned in the Guinness World Records: Gamer's Edition 2008, awarded in 2010. In 2009, Guinness World Records listed Pac-Man as the most recognizable video game character in the United States, recognized by 94% of the population, above Mario who was recognized by 93% of the population. In 2015, The Strong National Museum of Play inducted Pac-Man to its World Video Game Hall of Fame. The Pac-Man character and game series became an icon of video game culture during the 1980s.

The game has inspired various real-life recreations, involving real people or robots. One event called Pac-Manhattan set a Guinness World Record for "Largest Pac-Man Game" in 2004.

The business term "Pac-Man defense" in mergers and acquisitions refers to a hostile takeover target that attempts to reverse the situation and instead acquire its attempted acquirer, a reference to Pac-Man's energizers. The "Pac-Man renormalization" is named for a visual resemblance to the character, in the mathematical study of the Mandelbrot set by Dudko, Lyubich, and Selinger. The game's popularity has led to "Pac-Man" being adopted as a nickname, such as by boxer Manny Pacquiao and the American football player Adam Jones.

In 2012, the Pac-Man was inducted into the permanent collection of the Museum of Modern Art (MoMA) in New York City. This addition was part of an initial selection (Wave 1) of fourteen video games.

On August 21, 2016, in the 2016 Summer Olympics closing ceremony, during a video which showcases Tokyo as the host of the 2020 Summer Olympics, a small segment shows Pac-Man and the ghosts racing and eating dots on a running track.

=== Merchandise ===
A wide variety of Pac-Man merchandise have been marketed with the character's image. By 1982, Midway had about 95-105 licensees selling Pac-Man merchandise, including major companies, such as AT&T selling a Pac-Man telephone. There were more than 500 Pac-Man related products.

7-Eleven sold Pac-Man themed merchandise at its stores since the game's initial popularity in the 1980s. This has included collectible Slurpee and Big Gulp cups. In 2023, 7-Eleven included Pac-Man in its Spring 2023 marketing material including at Speedway and Stripes banner locations, and sold more merchandise around the game as well as rebranding some of its products after the ghosts. This included its house blend coffee (Clyde's Coffee Blend), two Slurpee flavors (Blinky's Cherry & Inky's Blueberry Raz), and a special limited time only cappuccino flavor (Pinky's Strawberry White Chocolate Cappuccino), the latter of which came out pink to match the ghost.

Pac-Man themed merchandise sales had exceeded $1 billion in the US by 1982. Pac-Man related merchandise products included bumper stickers, jewelry, accessories (such as a $20,000 Ms. Pac-Man choker with 14 karat gold), bicycles, breakfast cereals, popsicles, t-shirts, toys and pasta.

Lego released an exclusive set of a Pac-Man arcade machine for their Lego Icons line. A Lego version of Pac-Man, Clyde, and Blinky are featured on the top of the machine, with a minifigure playing a miniature version of the machine.

=== Television ===
Hanna-Barbera Productions produced an animated series adaptation of Pac-Man, which aired on ABC from 1982 to 1983. It was the highest-rated Saturday morning cartoon show in the US during late 1982.

A computer-generated animated series produced by Bandai Namco Games, 41 Entertainment, Arad Productions, OLM Digital and Sprite Animation Studios titled Pac-Man and the Ghostly Adventures aired on Disney XD from June 15, 2013, to May 25, 2015.

In May 2026 an animated web series titled PAC-MAN: Snack Breaks was announced. The series is produced by Bandai Namco Entertainment, with animation by Cartuna. Episodes will be released on the PAC-MAN Official YouTube channel starting May 22, with new episodes released monthly.

=== Literature ===
The original Pac-Man game plays a key role in the plot of Ernest Cline's video game-themed science fiction novel Ready Player One.

=== Music ===
The Buckner & Garcia song "Pac-Man Fever" (1981) went to No. 9 on the Billboard Hot 100 charts, and received a Gold certification for more than 1 million records sold by 1982, and a total of 2.5 million copies sold as of 2008. More than one million copies of the group's Pac-Man Fever album (1982) were sold.

In 1982, "Weird Al" Yankovic recorded a parody of "Taxman" by the Beatles as "Pac-Man". It was eventually released in 2017 as part of Squeeze Box: The Complete Works of "Weird Al" Yankovic. In 1992, Aphex Twin (with the name Power-Pill) released Pac-Man, a techno album which consists mostly of samples from the game.

The character appears in the music video for Bloodhound Gang's "Mope", released in 2000. Here, the character is portrayed as a cocaine addict.

On July 20, 2020, Gorillaz and Schoolboy Q, released a track entitled "Pac-Man" as a part of Gorillaz' Song Machine series to commemorate the game's 40th anniversary, with the music video depicting the band's frontman, 2-D, playing a Gorillaz-themed Pac-Man arcade game.

=== Film ===
The Pac-Man character appears in the film Pixels (2015), with Denis Akiyama playing series creator Toru Iwatani. Iwatani makes a cameo at the beginning of the film as an arcade technician. Pac-Man is referenced and makes an appearance in the 2017 film Guardians of the Galaxy Vol. 2 and the video game, Marvel's Guardians of the Galaxy. The game, the character, and the ghosts all appear in the film Wreck-It Ralph, as well as the sequel Ralph Breaks the Internet. The first Pac-Man mention is in the science fiction film Tron (1982).

In Sword Art Online The Movie: Ordinal Scale, Kirito and his friends beat a virtual reality game called PAC-Man 2026, which is loosely based on Pac-Man 256. In the Japanese tokusatsu film Kamen Rider Heisei Generations: Dr. Pac-Man vs. Ex-Aid & Ghost with Legend Riders, a Pac-Man-like character is the main villain.

In the 2010 film Scott Pilgrim vs. the World, the titular character makes reference to the original Japanese name.

The 2018 film Relaxer uses Pac-Man as a strong plot element in the story of a 1999 couch-bound man who attempts to beat the game (and encounters the famous Level 256 glitch) before the year 2000 problem occurs.

Various attempts for a feature film based on Pac-Man have been planned since the peak of the original game's popularity. Following the release of Ms. Pac-Man, a feature film was being developed, but never reached an agreement. In 2008, a live-action film based on the series was in development at Crystal Sky. In 2022, plans for a live-action Pac-Man film were revived at Wayfarer Studios, based on an idea by Chuck Williams. In 2025, the film was reportedly canceled as a result of the It Ends with Us controversy.

=== Other gaming media ===
In 1982, Milton Bradley Company released a board game based on Pac-Man. Players move up to four Pac-Man characters (traditional yellow plus red, green, and blue) plus two ghosts as per the throws of a pair of dice. The two ghost pieces were randomly packed with one of four colors.

Between 1982 and 1983, the Hanna-Barbera animated series Pac-Man aired on ABC, a Saturday-morning cartoon based on a video game.

Sticker manufacturer Fleer included rub-off game cards with its Pac-Man stickers. The card packages contain a Pac-Man style maze with all points along the path hidden with opaque coverings. From the starting position, the player moves around the maze while scratching off the coverings to score points.

=== Perfect scores and other records ===
A perfect score on the original Pac-Man arcade game is 3,333,360 points, achieved when the player obtains the maximum score on the first 255 levels by eating every dot, energizer, fruit and blue ghost without losing a life, then uses all six lives to obtain the maximum possible number of points on level 256.

The first person to achieve a publicly witnessed and verified perfect score without manipulating the game's hardware to freeze play was Billy Mitchell, who performed the feat on July 3, 1999. Some record keeping organizations removed Mitchell's score after a 2018 investigation by Twin Galaxies concluded that two unrelated Donkey Kong score performances submitted by Mitchell had not used an unmodified original circuit board. As of July 2020, seven other gamers had achieved perfect Pac-Man scores on original arcade hardware. The world record for the fastest completion of a perfect score, according to Twin Galaxies, is held by David Race with a time of 3 hours, 28 minutes, 49 seconds.

In December 1982, eight-year-old boy Jeffrey R. Yee received a letter from United States president Ronald Reagan congratulating him on a world record score of 6,131,940 points, possible only if he had passed level 256. In September 1983, Walter Day, chief scorekeeper at Twin Galaxies at the time, took the US National Video Game Team on a tour of the East Coast to visit gamers who claimed the ability to pass that level. None demonstrated such an ability. In 1999, Billy Mitchell offered $100,000 to anyone who could pass level 256 before January 1, 2000. The offer expired with the prize unclaimed.

After announcing in 2018 that it would no longer recognize the first perfect score on Pac-Man, Guinness World Records reversed that decision and reinstated Billy Mitchell's 1999 performance on June 18, 2020.

== Remakes and sequels ==
Pac-Man was followed by a series of sequels, remakes, and re-imaginings, and is one of the longest-running video game franchises in history. The first of these was Ms. Pac-Man, developed by the American-based General Computer Corporation and published by Midway in 1982. The character's gender was changed to female in response to Pac-Man's popularity with women, with new mazes, moving bonus items, and faster gameplay being implemented to increase its appeal. Ms. Pac-Man is one of the best-selling arcade games in North America, where Pac-Man and Ms. Pac-Man had become the most successful machines in the history of the amusement arcade industry. Legal concerns raised over who owned the game caused Ms. Pac-Man to become owned by Namco, who assisted in production of the game. Ms. Pac-Man inspired its own line of remakes, including Ms. Pac-Man Maze Madness (2000), and Ms. Pac-Man: Quest for the Golden Maze, and is included in many Namco and Pac-Man collections for consoles.

Namco's own follow-up to the original was Super Pac-Man, released in 1982. This was followed by the Japan-exclusive Pac & Pal in 1983. Midway produced many other Pac-Man sequels during the early 1980s, including Pac-Man Plus (1982), Jr. Pac-Man (1983), Baby Pac-Man (1983), and Professor Pac-Man (1984). Other games include the isometric Pac-Mania (1987), the side-scrollers Pac-Land (1984), Hello! Pac-Man (1994), and Pac-In-Time (1995), the 3D platformer Pac-Man World (1999), and the puzzle games Pac-Attack (1991) and Pac-Pix (2005). Iwatani designed Pac-Land and Pac-Mania, both of which remain his favorite games in the series. Pac-Man Championship Edition, published for the Xbox 360 in 2007, was Iwatani's final game before leaving the company. Its neon visuals and fast-paced gameplay was met with acclaim, leading to the creation of Pac-Man Championship Edition DX (2010) and Pac-Man Championship Edition 2 (2016).

Coleco's tabletop Mini-Arcade versions of the game yielded 1.5 million units sold in 1982. Nelsonic Industries produced a Pac-Man LCD wristwatch game with a simplified maze also in 1982.

Namco Networks sold a downloadable Windows PC version of Pac-Man in 2009 which also includes an enhanced mode which replaces all of the original sprites with the sprites from Pac-Man Championship Edition. Namco Networks made a downloadable bundle which includes its PC version of Pac-Man and its port of Dig Dug called Namco All-Stars: Pac-Man and Dig Dug. In 2010, Namco Bandai announced the release of the game on Windows Phone 7 as an Xbox Live game.

For the weekend of May 21–23, 2010, Google changed the logo on its homepage to a playable version of the game in recognition of the 30th anniversary of the game's release. The Google Doodle version of Pac-Man was estimated to have been played by more than 1 billion people worldwide in 2010, so Google later gave the game its own page.

In April 2011, Soap Creative published World's Biggest Pac-Man, working together with Microsoft and Namco-Bandai to celebrate Pac-Man's 30th anniversary. It is a multiplayer browser-based game with user-created, interlocking mazes.

For April Fools' Day in 2017, Google created a playable of the game on Google Maps where users were able to play the game using the map onscreen.

A Pac-Man-themed downloadable content package for Minecraft was released in 2020 in commemoration of the game's 40th anniversary. This pack introduced a ghost called 'Creepy', based on the Creeper.

== Technology ==
The original arcade system board had one Z80A processor, running at 3.072 MHz, 16 Kbyte of ROM and 3 Kbyte of static RAM. Of those 1 Kbyte each was for video RAM, color RAM and generic program RAM. There were two custom chips on the board: the 285 sync bus controller and the 284 video RAM addresser, but daughterboards made only from standard parts were also widely used instead. Video output was (analog) component video with composite sync. A further 8 Kbytes of character ROM was used for characters, background tiles and sprites and an additional 1 Kbit of static RAM was used to hold 4bpp sprite data for one scanline and was written to during the horizontal blanking period preceding each line. Sprite size was always 16x16 pixels, one of the four colors per pixel was for transparency (of the background).

The monitor was installed 90 degree rotated clockwise, the first visible scanline started in the top right corner and ends in the bottom right corner. The horizontal blanking period, which starts after the level indicator at the bottom is drawn, had a duration of 96 pixel clock ticks, enough time to fetch 4 bytes of sprite data per 16 clock ticks for 6 sprites. Although attribute memory exists for them, sprites 0 and 7 are unusable: Their pixel fetch timing windows are occupied by the bottom level indicator (which just precedes the hblank) for sprite 0 and two rows of characters at the top of the screen, which just follow the hblank, for sprite 7.
