= Gee Bee (video game) =

1978 video game

- North American arcade flyer
- Developer: Namco
- Publishers: JP: Namco; NA: Gremlin Industries
- Designer: Toru Iwatani
- Programmer: Shigeichi Ishimura
- Series: Gee Bee
- Platform: Arcade
- Release: JP: October 1978; NA: January 1979
- Genres: Pinball, block breaker
- Modes: Single-player, multiplayer

Gee Bee (Note: Japanese: ジービー, Hepburn: Jī Bī) is a 1978 block breaker and pinball video game developed and published by Namco for arcades. The player controls a set of paddles with a rotary knob, where the goal is to score as many points as possible by deflecting a ball against bricks, pop bumpers and other objects in the playfield. It was developed by Toru Iwatani, known as the creator of Pac-Man and Pole Position. Outside Japan, it was published by Gremlin Industries.

Gee Bee was the first video game to be designed in-house by Namco. Prior to this, the company had manufactured arcade electro-mechanical games (such as Periscope and F-1) and published a number of video games by Atari, Inc. (notably Breakout) in Japan. Iwatani originally wanted to produce pinball machines for the company, but higher-ups at Namco disapproved of the idea. As a compromise, Iwatani instead made a video game with pinball-elements, combined with mechanics established in Breakout.

Gee Bee was the eighth highest-grossing arcade video game of 1978 in Japan, and sold 10,000 units worldwide. It was not as successful as hoped, but it would nevertheless help establish Namco's presence in the video game industry. Two sequels were produced in 1979: Bomb Bee and Cutie Q.

== Gameplay ==
Arcade screenshot

Gee Bee is a block breaker arcade game intermixed with elements of a pinball table. The player uses a rotary dial to control a set of paddles on-screen, the goal being to score as many points as possible by deflecting a ball towards objects placed on the board. These include Breakout-like brick formations, pop bumpers that award ten points each when hit, and spinners that slow down the ball. Making the ball touch the "NAMCO" rollover symbols (replaced by the Gremlin logo in the North American version) causes them to light up and having all of them lit up increases the score multiplier.

== Development and release ==
Gee Bee was developed by Toru Iwatani and was Namco's first video game produced in-house. The company began their insertion into game development in July 1976, when Shigeichi Ishimura, a Namco electro-mechanical game designer, proposed the idea of creating a video arcade game utilizing a CPU, with information accumulated from his work on electro-mechanical games. Namco approved of the idea and purchased a surplus amount of PDA-08 microcomputers from NEC, employees being assigned to study the system's potential to create video games.

In 1977, Toru Iwatani joined Namco, shortly after graduating college. Before the arrival of Iwatani, Namco was publishing Atari arcade games in Japan, following their acquisition of Atari Japan a few years prior. Iwatani wanted to create pinball machines as opposed to video games, but Namco higher-ups disapproved of his idea. As a compromise, Iwatani was allowed to instead create a video game based on the concept of pinball, akin to Atari's Video Pinball dedicated console, intermixed with the gameplay elements established in Breakout. Ishimura would assist with programming. Due to hardware limitations, strips of cellophane were applied to the monitor to compensate for the lack of color. The actual layout of the game board is made to resemble a human face. The game was named after the Japanese word for carpenter bee, "kumanbachi", and used the same font type from Atari's unreleased arcade title Cannonball from 1976. Gee Bee was first released in Japan in October 1978. Gremlin Industries licensed the game for distribution in North America, where it was released in January 1979.

== Reception and legacy ==
The game is reported to have sold nearly 10,000 units, which was a good sales figure for its time, but Gee Bee was not as successful as Namco hoped it would be, due to coin drop earnings per unit falling below expectations and because of competition from Taito's Space Invaders. Nevertheless, Gee Bee was the eighth highest-earning arcade video game of 1978 in Japan, and helped establish Namco as a prime video game developer in Japan, leading to them producing their own arcade games alongside publishing those from other companies. Cashbox complimented the game's cabinet artwork and later said it had a "good looking cabinet and graphics". In a retrospective, Earn Green of Allgame noted the game's importance for Namco, being Toru Iwatani's first video game for the company. Retro Gamer listed Gee Bee as one of the best Breakout clones for its notability as Namco's first internally designed video game.

Gee Bee would spawn two sequel titles, including Bomb Bee, which was released a year later in 1979. This game includes colorized graphics, new gameplay additions such as a 1,000 point pop bumper, and the ability to earn extra lives. A second sequel, Cutie Q, was released in 1979. This one was not developed by Iwatani, but rather Shigeru Yokoyama, who would later create Galaga, although Iwatani designed a number of the sprites. Cutie Q is notable for featuring "cute" characters, which would become a key inspiration for character design in Iwatani's next work, Pac-Man, released a year later. Both Bomb Bee and Cutie Q were ported to the PlayStation in 1996 in the Japanese version of Namco Museum Vol. 2. However, international versions replaced both games with Super Pac-Man. Cutie Q was also ported over to the Wii as part of Namco Museum Remix in 2007 and its 2010 update Namco Museum Megamix. On October 2, 2025, the game was digitally re-released for the Nintendo Switch and PlayStation 4 as part of the Arcade Archives series, and also for the Nintendo Switch 2 (released the following day), PlayStation 5 and Xbox Series X/S as part of the Arcade Archives 2 series.
