= Cutie Q =

1979 video game

- Japanese instruction card
- Developer: Namco
- Publisher: Namco
- Designers: Shigeru Yokoyama; Toru Iwatani
- Series: Gee Bee
- Platforms: Arcade, Mobile phone
- Release: Arcade: JP: November 1979; Mobile: JP: September 1, 2008
- Genres: Pinball, block breaker
- Modes: Single-player, multiplayer
- Arcade system: Namco Warp & Warp

Cutie Q (Note: Japanese: キューティQ(キュー), Hepburn: Kyūti Kyū) is a 1979 block breaker/video pinball hybrid arcade game developed and published by Namco in Japan. The player controls a set of paddles with a rotary knob, with the objective being to score as many points possible by deflecting a ball against blocks, ghosts, spinners and other objects on the playfield. It was designed by Shigeru Yokoyama, with spritework done by Toru Iwatani. It is the third and final game in the Gee Bee trilogy.

Cutie Q is described as Namco's first "character game", thanks to its use of colorful and cute character designs, a choice that was a major influence on Iwatani's next project, Pac-Man. The title was derived from the band Creedence Clearwater Revival's 1968 cover of the song Susie Q, which Iwatani was a fan of. To lower manufacturing costs, it was only sold as a conversion kit for older Gee Bee and Bomb Bee arcade units.

The game was ported to the PlayStation in 1996 as part of the Japanese release of Namco Museum Vol. 2, with Bomb Bee included as an unlockable extra — international versions replaced them both with Super Pac-Man. The game was later included in 2007's Namco Museum Remix for the Wii, and later in its 2010 update Namco Museum Megamix. A Japanese mobile phone port was released for Yahoo! Keitai services in 2008, where it was renamed QTQ. Ports for both the Sharp X1 and PC-9801 were developed but later cancelled.

== Gameplay ==
Arcade screenshot

Cutie Q is a block breaker video game intermixed with elements found in pinball tables. The player controls a set of paddles using a rotary dial, the objective is to score as many points possible by deflecting a ball against objects on the playfield - these include colorful "Rainbow Block" formations, pink ghosts known as "Minimon", spinners that slow down the ball, and small yellow creatures known as "Walkmen" that appear when an entire formation of blocks is destroyed.

The middle of the screen has a set of sad-faced rollover symbols, and touching them with the ball will instead make them turn happy — lighting all of them up increases the score multiplier. An extra ball is awarded by touching each of the lettered symbols found on both sides of the screen, or by having the ball collide with the green drainage blocks found at the bottom. Having the ball touch the bottom paddle will replace any cleared-out brick formations and increase the number of Minimon on the screen.

== Development and release ==
Cutie Q was developed and released by Namco in November 1979, following the release of Galaxian. The game was designed by Shigeru Yokoyama, known for his work on Galaga, while Toru Iwatani designed a number of the sprites. It is the third game in the Gee Bee trilogy, and much like its predecessors was the result of a compromise with Namco, who was disinterested in creating pinball machines. It was described as Namco's first "character game" for its use of cute, colorful characters, a design choice that had a major influence on Iwatani's next work, Pac-Man. The name is derived from the band Creedence Clearwater Revival's cover of the song "Susie Q" from 1957, which Iwatani was a fan of. To help save manufacturing costs, Cutie Q was only sold as a conversion kit for older Gee Bee and Bomb Bee arcade units.

Cutie Q was ported to the PlayStation as part of the Japanese release of Namco Museum Vol. 2 in 1996, which also included its predecessor Bomb Bee as an unlockable extra. Both titles were replaced with Super Pac-Man in international releases. A limited edition "collector's box" was also released in Japan that bundled the game with a paddle controller and replica promotional material for the included games. Cutie Q was also included in the 2007 compilation Namco Museum Remix for the Wii as one of the nine included arcade titles, as well as its 2010 update Namco Museum Megamix. A Japanese mobile phone port was released for Yahoo! Keitai network services on September 1, 2008, renamed to QTQ.

In 1987, a port of Cutie Q and its predecessor Bomb Bee was being developed for the Sharp X1 by Dempa, a developer that had worked with Namco to bring many of the company's arcade titles to home computers in Japan. Programming was done by Mikito Ishikawa, who was fascinated with the arcade version's source code. The game was cancelled due to the impending rise of more powerful consoles, notably the Sega Mega Drive, with Dempa believing Ishikawa was proposing the port as a sort of joke. A second port was in development by Ishikawa for the PC-9801 in the mid-1990s; a deal with Namco was nearly finished, but was cancelled again due to the company instead porting it to the PlayStation for Namco Museum Vol. 2.

== Reception and legacy ==
In their coverage of Namco Museum Vol. 2, Computer & Video Games called the game "brilliantly addictive" for combining the gameplay of Breakout and pinball tables, as well as for the inclusion of an "authentic" paddle controller to play it. In a retrospective, Earl Green of Allgame noted the game's importance to the creation of Pac-Man with its colorful character designs. Kristan Reed of Eurogamer was more negative, calling the game "rubbish" in his review of Namco Museum Remix, commenting that while the game was interesting for its historical value, said that players would only play it for a few minutes before becoming bored.

In 1987, nearly a decade after the release of Cutie Q, Namco released a similar block breaker game, Quester, in an effort to compete against Taito's Arkanoid — Iwatani was assigned as the project's producer. Although not directly related to the Gee Bee trilogy, the game's 26th stage is designed after a Rainbow Block Cutie Q. This game was ported to the Japanese Wii Virtual Console in 2009, renamed to Namco Quester.
