= Bomb Bee =

1979 video game

- Developer: Namco
- Publishers: Namco; Nintendo
- Designer: Toru Iwatani
- Programmers: Shouichi Fukatani; Shigeichi Ishimura
- Series: Gee Bee
- Platform: Arcade
- Release: JP: September 1979
- Genres: Block breaker, video pinball
- Modes: Single-player, multiplayer

Bomb Bee (Note: Japanese: ボムビー, Hepburn: Bomu Bī) is a 1979 block breaker and pinball video game developed and published by Namco for arcades. It was only released in Japan in September 1979. It is the sequel to Gee Bee, which was released in the previous year. Nintendo released a licensed version titled Bomb Bee-N.

Hamster Corporation released the game as part of their Arcade Archives series for the Nintendo Switch and PlayStation 4, as well as their Arcade Archives 2 series for the Nintendo Switch 2, PlayStation 5 and Xbox Series X/S in November 2025.

== Gameplay ==
Gameplay screenshot

The maximum number of players is two, and the two players have to alternate. The control is a rotary analog stick. The main object of the game is to move two paddles that ricochet a ball which flies around and needs to hit the colored bricks above it. When the bricks are cleared out of the side sections, it will turn that same side's pop-bumper into 100 points instead of 10. It is a bonus multiplier to get the ball to light up the word "NAMCO".

== Reception and legacy ==
Reception

Review score
Publication	Score
AllGame	2.5/5

Bomb Bee was not a success when it was released. According to Matt Barton, the author of the book Vintage Games 2.0, the game did not sell well and likely sold the same amount of machines as Gee Bee, a game that didn't meet sales expectations either. The success of Namco's later release Galaxian, a revolutionary shooting game, is believed to have contributed to its failure. When Galaxian proved successful, Namco offered to bundle Bomb Bee machines with Galaxian to arcade owners in order to clear inventory.

Retrospectively in 1998, Earl Green of AllGame said that outside a few minor differences, Bomb Bee was largely the same as its predecessor. However, he noted that the game's usage of a full-color display, and being among the earliest creations by Toru Iwatani, made the game of historical value. In his blog Before Mario, Erik Voskuel says that Bomb Bee marks the first collaboration between Namco and Nintendo, two developers that would work together on many more titles, making it a historically-significant game. Voskuel also says that Bomb Bee is notable for being the first appearance of a third-party title on a Nintendo console, and being among Iwatani's earliest creations before Pac-Man.
