= Tōru Iwatani =

Japanese video game designer (born 1955)

- 岩谷徹
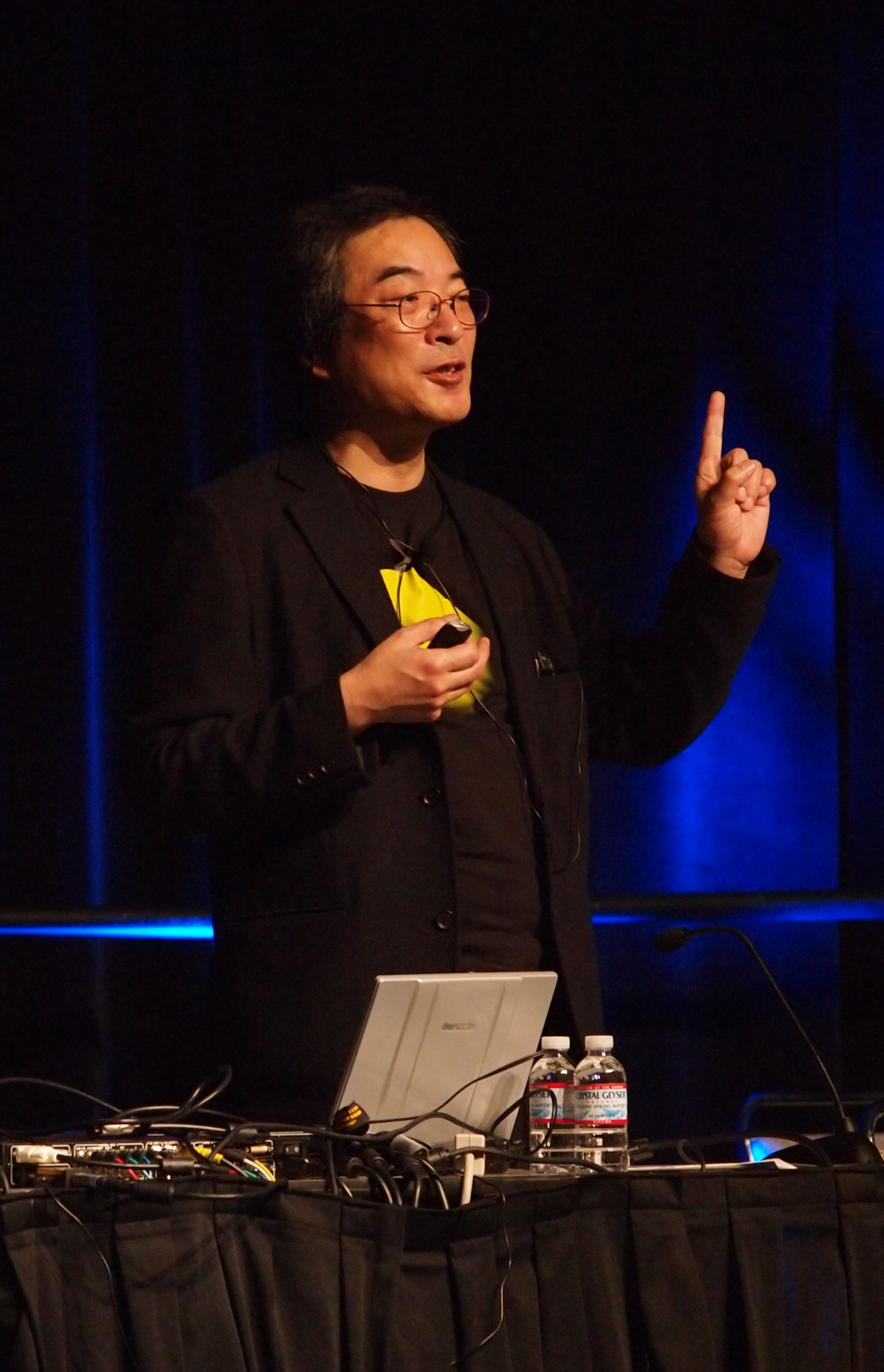
- Iwatani at the 2011 Game Developers Conference
- Born: January 25, 1955 (age 71); Meguro, Tokyo, Japan
- Occupation: Video game designer
- Years active: 1980–present
- Known for: Creator of Pac-Man

Tōru Iwatani (岩谷 徹, Iwatani Tōru; born January 25, 1955) is a Japanese video game designer who spent much of his career working for Namco. He is best known and commemorated for being the creator of the arcade game Pac-Man (1980). In 2009, he was chosen by IGN as one of the top 100 game creators of all time.

== Early life ==
Iwatani was born in the Meguro ward of Tokyo, Japan, on January 25, 1955. While in kindergarten, he and his family moved to the Tōhoku region of Japan after his father got a job as an engineer for the Japan Broadcasting Corporation. After becoming a junior high student, Iwatani returned to Tokyo and graduated from the Tokyo Metropolitan University High School, before graduating from the Tokai University Faculty of Engineering. Iwatani was self-taught in computers without any formal training in programming or graphic design. He often filled his school textbooks with scattered manga, which he claims had a major influence on the character designs of his games.

== Career ==
At the age of 22, Iwatani joined the Japanese video game publisher Namco in 1977. Before he had joined, Namco had acquired the rights to the Japanese division of Atari, Inc. from Nolan Bushnell, giving them the rights to distribute many of the company's games, such as Breakout, across the country. This became an unprecedented success for Namco, and made them interested in producing their own video games in-house instead of relying on other companies to make games for them.

Iwatani was assigned to the video game development division of the company upon arrival. He originally wanted to create pinball machines; however, Namco executives declined the idea due to patent-related issues. As a compromise, Iwatani was allowed to create a video game based on the concept of pinball. With the assistance of programmer Shigeichi Ishimura, Iwatani created Gee Bee, released in 1978. While not as successful as the company hoped, Gee Bee helped Namco get a foothold in the gradually expanding video game market. Two sequels were released in 1979, Bomb Bee and Cutie Q, which Iwatani worked on as a designer.

Towards the end of 1979, Iwatani grew disappointed in the video game industry, thinking that the market only appealed to men through its usage of violent "war" games, such as Space Invaders, and sports games reminiscent of Pong. He decided to create a video game that appealed to women, with cute, colorful character design and easy-to-understand gameplay, based around the concept of eating. Working with a small team of nine employees, Iwatani created Pac-Man, test-marketed on May 22, 1980, and released in Japan in July and in North America in October. While it proved to be only a moderate success in Japan, being outperformed by Namco's own Galaxian, Pac-Man was an astronomical success in North America, quickly selling over 100,000 arcade units and becoming the best-selling and highest-grossing arcade game of all time. Pac-Man has since become Namco's most successful video game of all time and the company's signature title. After its release, Iwatani was promoted within the ranks of Namco, eventually becoming responsible for overseeing the administration of the company. Despite the success of Pac-Man, Iwatani did not receive any kind of bonus or change of salary. An often-repeated story is that Iwatani left Namco furious at the lack of any recognition or additions to his pay, which he has claimed to be false.

Iwatani's ideas about gaming and the origins of Pac-Man are described in the book Programmers at Work, a collection of interviews published by Microsoft Press in 1986.

Iwatani went on to design Libble Rabble in 1983, a twin-stick puzzler based on a game he had played in his childhood. Iwatani claims Libble Rabble to be his favorite game. He also worked as a producer for many of Namco's arcade games, including Rally-X, Galaga, Pole Position, Ridge Racer and Time Crisis. From April 2005, he taught the subject of Character Design Studies at Osaka University of Arts as visiting professor. Iwatani left Namco in March 2007 to become a full-time lecturer at Tokyo Polytechnic University. Iwatani returned to his Pac-Man roots in 2007 when he developed Pac-Man Championship Edition for the Xbox 360, which he stated is the final game he will develop.

On June 3, 2010, at the Festival of Games, Iwatani received a certificate from Guinness World Records for Pac-Man having the most "coin-operated arcade machines" installed worldwide: 293,822. The record was set and recognized in 2005, and recorded in the Guinness World Records: Gamer's Edition 2008.

He was portrayed in the Adam Sandler sci-fi comedy adventure Pixels by actor Denis Akiyama, while Iwatani himself has a cameo as an arcade repairman.

== Ludography ==
Year	Title	Role
1978	Gee Bee	Designer
1979	Bomb Bee	Designer
1979	Cutie Q	Designer
1980	Pac-Man	Designer
1980	Rally-X	Producer
1981	Galaga	Producer
1982	Pole Position	Producer
1982	Super Pac-Man	Designer
1983	Pole Position II	Producer
1983	Libble Rabble	Designer
1984	Pac-Land	Producer
1987	Pac-Mania	Director
1987	Quester	Producer
1993	Ridge Racer	Producer
1995	Time Crisis	Producer
2007	Pac-Man Championship Edition	Project Supervisor

== Bibliography ==
- Iwatani, Toru (2005-09-17). Pakkuman no Gēmu Gaku Nyūmon [Pacman's Methods [sic]]. Enter Brain. ISBN 978-4757717527.
- Iwatani, Toru (2012-06-21). Gēmu no Ryūgi [The style of game [sic]]. Ohta Books. ISBN 978-4778313265.
