= Nicolas Gaume =

French entrepreneur and video games creator

- Born: 7 February 1971 (age 55); Bagnères-de-Bigorre, France
- Occupation: Chairman of Mimesis Republic
- Years active: 1990–present
- Known for: Kalisto Entertainment
- Children: 3
- Parent(s): Louis Gaume, a famous French architect

Nicolas Gaume (born 7 February 1971) is a French entrepreneur. He is best known for leading various companies in the video game industry and founding Kalisto Entertainment, where he was the head of the company between 1990 and 2002. Gaume is the son of one of the hoteliers of Arcachon, and is the great-grandson of Louis Gaume, a real estate developer known for developing the Pyla in 1920.

== Atreid Concept ==
In 1990, after dropping out of business school, Gaume and his friends founded his video game company, Atreid Concept, in Bordeaux. Atreid Concept was supported by Apple, whose CEO John Sculley was a former executive of the French Apple firm. Atreid Concept released a series of games for Macintosh including S.C.O.U.T. and Fury of the Furries under the brand name Kalisto. The company also released titles for video game consoles, rebranding Fury of the Furries to Pac-In-Time under license from Namco and utilizing their Pac-Man intellectual property. This granted Nicolas his first commercial success, after more than 500,000 copies of the game were sold worldwide.

== Mindscape Bordeaux ==
Faced with technological change—such the replacement of floppy disks by CD-ROM—and other financial restraints, Gaume sold Atreid Concept to a British group called Pearson, who had just purchased the multimedia publishing group Mindscape. Atreid Concept was renamed Mindscape Bordeaux. Under this new name, Gaume and his team developed the first game for Windows 95, a race car game, titled Al Unser Jr. Arcade Racing. They also attempted to expand the videogame into a book and a role-play game.

== Kalisto Entertainment ==
In 1996, Gaume purchased the multimedia rights of Pearson, a British group, to found the company Kalisto Entertainment. Under Gaume's leadership, Kalisto developed video game titles, such as Dark Earth and Nightmare Creatures. Nightmare Creatures was picked up by Activision sold more than 1.5 million copies worldwide.

In 1999, thanks to multiple pre-production contracts signed, the company went public on the Stock Exchange in order to raise funds for new projects. Kalisto Entertainment also developed products for the online market, as well as developing services for phone network operators. At this time, Kalisto developed ‘’The Fifth Element’’, based on Luc Besson's movie. The game was edited by Ubisoft, and sold more than 750,000 copies worldwide.

In the wake of his enormous success of 1999, and after announcing sales of 140 million Euros, Gaume was invited to accompany Jacques Chirac, President of the French Republic, on an official trip.

Many celebrities were elected to the board of directors of Kalisto Entertainment, such as Franck Riboud, CEO of the group Danone, and Emmanuel Chain, the ex-journalist oh the TV channel M6. Dominique Strauss-Kahn, Minister of Economy, Finances and Industry, nominated him for the Economical and Social Committee. In addition, First Minister Lionel Jospin named him an Advisor of French Foreign Trade.

In the beginning of 2000, during the waning days of the internet bubble, Kalisto Entertainment found itself in a dire financial situation. In 2002, after failing to gather more funding from Hedge Fund Global Emerging Markets, Kalisto Entertainment found itself in compulsory liquidation, and was forced out of the Market on 19 August 2002.

As a result of the exceptional losses, regulation authorities accused the managers of grossly misinforming their stockholders. In January 2003, 270 minority stockholders decided to sue Kalisto Entertainment in order to obtain retributory damages, and the managers of Kalisto Entertainment were discharged. In addition, a civil procedure has also ensued against the Crédit Lyonnais bank. In the end, a decision was made by the Second Civil Chamber of the Appellate Court of Bordeaux on October 20, 2009, which permanently assessed the reasons of the losses of Kalisto Entertainment, and acquitted its managers of fault for the company's losses.

== Responsibilities in the world of gaming ==
Gaume briefly led Ubisoft Paris in 2003, and from 2002 to 2005 he worked as an advisor for the British publisher Codemasters, while continuing to work for Ubisoft. From 2005 to 2007, Nicolas was vice president of the mobile games branch of Lagardère Active.

== Mimesis Republic ==
In 2007, Gaume, along with Sebastian Lombardo, co-founded the company Mimesis Republic. The main focus of their new company was to develop multi-player games. Mimesis Republic's first original project, named Black Mamba, was the basis of an ambitious virtual world called Mamba Nation, whose development began in 2008.

In July 2010, Mimesis Republic raised $7 million from various investors, including prestigious business executives such as Marc Simoncini, CEO and founder of the dating site Meetic, and Jean-Emile Rosenblum, founder and director of Pixmania and Francois Pinault, through his holding company Artemis SA.

The social game Mamba Nation, published by Mimesis Republic in early 2012, attracted over 400,000 users between the ages of 13 and 25 in France alone. Free accessibility via Facebook enables Mamba Nation users to create, develop, personalize and share avatars that they control, within the universe in which the game takes place. A chat function allows users talk to each other while they play. The game features a 3D interface and video, through partnership with Dailymotion.

After the release of Mamba Nation, Mimesis Republic faded out of the public eye. Gaume had since transitioned to businesses in the space industry, founding Space Cargo Unlimited in 2014 and working with Jason Andrews to found Orbite in 2019.

== Space Cargo Unlimited ==
Nicolas Gaume is the Co-founder and Chief Executive Officer of Space Cargo Unlimited, a European private space operator founded in 2014 that specializes in leveraging microgravity for commercial research and manufacturing missions. Under Gaume’s leadership, the company has developed missions such as WISE—a comprehensive research program in low Earth orbit focused on agriculture and viticulture—and is advancing the development of autonomous orbital infrastructure like the REV1 space factory and BentoBox platforms to support in-space manufacturing and microgravity experimentation for industrial and scientific customers. Notably the company sent a bottle of Petrus wine to age for a year in orbit, the wine was auctioned at Christie's.

== Orbite ==
In 2019, Gaume co-founded Orbite alongside Jason Andrews. Orbite is a commercial space training and experience company. Orbite is developing astronaut preparation programs and plans for an Astronaut Training Complex designed to train and support future commercial space travelers training on Earth.

== Books ==
In 1994, Gaume founded NGM Productions, under which he managed the publication of various children's books in China. NGM edited the series of Père Castor (Flammarion) as well as Incollables (Play Bac) from 1994 until 1999. In 1995 he also participated in the creation of one of the first French web agencies, Wcube, and in 2000, he participated in the company promotion and marketing of wine on the Internet, for the site winealley.com.

== Works ==
- Gaume, Nicolas (2006). Citizen game. Paris: A. Carrière. ISBN 978-2843373312.
