= French video game policy =

French video game policy refers to the strategy and set of measures laid out by France since 2002 to maintain and develop a local video game development industry in order to preserve European market diversity.

== History ==
=== Proposals for government support ===
The French game developer trade group, known as Association des Producteurs d'Oeuvres Multimedia (APOM, now "Syndicat National du Jeu Video") was founded in 2001 by Eden Studios' Stéphane Baudet, Kalisto's Nicolas Gaume, former cabinet member and author Alain Le Diberder, financier and former journalist Romain Poirot-Lellig and Darkworks' Antoine Villette. APOM was for established for game developers only, since game publishers were already grouped under the umbrella of the Syndicat des Editeurs de Logiciels de Loisirs (SELL).

In November 2002, the Prime Minister Jean-Pierre Raffarin visited Darkworks, and formally asked game developers to submit him a set of proposals, promising to meet again in Spring 2003 to give his feedback.

Confronted by the bankruptcies or difficulties of many studios such as Cryo, Kalisto, Arxel Tribe, APOM had to propose short term solutions as well as long term, growth-oriented measures to the French government. Video game professionals responded in March 2003 with a set of proposals, including several options to set up a long term financing system to develop quality video games for the European and international market.

=== Era of government support ===
On April 19, 2003, the Prime Minister announced the creation of the Ecole Nationale du Jeu Video et des Medias Interactifs, a national school dedicated to the education of game development executives and project managers. He also announced the creation of a 4 million euro prototyping fund for games managed by the Centre National de la Cinematographie, the "Fonds d'Aide pour l'Edition Multimédia" ("FAEM"), and that he would order a report to be drafted in order to determine and to answer the needs of the game development industry with regards to international competition and financing issues.

The report was delivered to the Prime minister and the minister of Finances in January 2004. Depicting an accurate state of the game industry in France, it retained the APOM idea of a tax credit on game production expenses and made other proposals in order to develop the game development industry over the long term. In July 2004, the Finance ministry formed a video game task force to draft the measures proposed by the Fries report. A group of game industry members, led by Romain Poirot-Lellig, joined government representatives led by the Direction du Trésor in this task force from late August to mid-October 2004. The resulting confidential document was submitted to the executive branch of government and, in November 2004, the Prime minister ratified in favor of a Tax credit on game production expenses.

In 2005, a changed of government resulted in Dominique de Villepin succeeding Jean-Pierre Raffarin as Prime Minister. Although not its first priority, video game issues, delayed by concerns related to other tax credits under scrutiny in Brussels, were still on the government's agenda. On October 11, 2005, Minister of Culture Renaud Donnedieu de Vabres and Minister of Industry François Loos visited the Montreuil studio of Ubisoft Entertainment S.A. Their visit is shortly followed by the one of Dominique de Villepin on December 9, 2005. During his visit, de Villepin announced that the government would notify the video game tax credit to the European Commission within the next two weeks.

On November 23, 2007 French President Nicolas Sarkozy made a speech where he expressed strong support for the video game industry, underlining the potential for video games to become a major art form in the 21st century. He also expressed his wish that the video game tax credit be approved by the EU Commission and made functional very soon. On December 12, the European Commission approved the tax credit.

In 2013, the French Parliament voted to include all types of video games in the tax credit, and not only the ones below the PEGI 18 rating system. The cultural criteria remain fully in place and enforced.

On November 17, 2016, the French Parliament voted to increase the rate of the tax credit to 30% (previously 20%), and to increase the ceiling of receivable tax credit to 6 million, up from 3 million, per company per year.

== French video game companies ==
- Adeline Software International - Lyon 1993 - 1999 . Became No Cliché.
- Kalisto - Bordeaux 1990-2001
- Infogrames - Lyon 1983. Buy and Became Atari
- Ubisoft - Montreuil-sous-Bois 1986
- Arkane Studios - Lyon 2001
- Atari
- Quantic Dream
- Cyanide
- Novaquark
