= Gaume (surname) =

Gaume is a surname of French origin. Notable people with the surname include:

- Dallas Gaume (born 1963), Canadian former ice hockey player
- Jean-Joseph Gaume (1802–1879), French Roman Catholic theologian and author
- Nicolas Gaume (born 1971), French entrepreneur
