= Arkhan (name) =

Arkhan is a given name. People with the name include:

== People ==
- Arkhan Fikri (born 2004), Indonesian footballer
- Arkhan Kaka (born 2007), Indonesian footballer

== Media ==
- Arkhan, main character of video game Dark Earth
- Arkhan the Cruel, a Dungeons & Dragons character created by Joe Manganiello
- Arkhan the Black, a character from Total War: Warhammer II
