= Pac-In-Time =

1995 video game

- North American SNES cover art
- Developer: Atreid Concept
- Publishers: Namco: Game Boy; JP: Namco; NA: Namco Hometek; EU: Nintendo Super NES; JP: Namco; NA: Namco Hometek; PAL: Mindscape Mac OS, MS-DOS Mindscape
- Composer: Frédéric Motte
- Series: Pac-Man
- Platforms: Game Boy, Super NES, MS-DOS, Mac OS
- Release: January 3, 1995: Game Boy; JP: January 3, 1995; EU: January 1995; NA: February 1995 Super NES; JP: January 3, 1995; NA/PAL: January 1995 Mac OS, MS-DOS; NA: February 1995
- Genre: Platform
- Mode: Single-player

Pac-In-Time (Note: Japanese: パックインタイム, Hepburn: Pakku In Taimu) is a 1995 platform game developed by Atreid Concept and published by Namco for the Super Nintendo Entertainment System and Game Boy. It is a reskinned version of the 1993 game Fury of the Furries, also developed by Atreid, modified to feature Pac-Man. It was also released for MS-DOS and Mac OS, where the original game was released.

The game is an offshoot from the normal variety of Pac-Man games, in that it does not confine Pac-Man to a maze-like board. Rather, the player controls Pac-Man through various side-scrolling levels, obtaining many different items along the way; the plot does take elements from the earlier Pac-Man games, such as the objective of collecting a certain number of pellets before exiting a level. The game allows the player to access completed levels via passwords that are given every five levels.

The MS-DOS, Macintosh, and Game Boy versions are almost identical to the original, while the SNES version, despite using the same basic gameplay mechanics, is an entirely new game using a different game engine and aesthetic.

== Gameplay ==
Super Nintendo screenshot

In Pac-In-Time, players control Pac-Man in his mission to return to the present day after his nemesis, the Ghost Witch, cast a spell that transported him to his youth in 1975, five years before his debut appearance. The game spans the course of five different worlds with 10 levels each. Levels are designed around solving puzzles and backtracking to previous sections, taking place in environments such as mountains, villages, and castles. The objective of each level is to collect all of the pellets, or "Pac-Dots", found throughout to open up an exit door. Each level contains around 30 Pac-Dots each, with a counter displayed at the bottom-left of the screen that indicates how many remain. Enemies and obstacles are found throughout that will cause Pac-Man to lose a portion of his life-bar when touched. The Ghosts also appear and will give chase to Pac-Man; he can defeat them by eating a Power Pellet, which will cause them to turn blue and edible.

Pac-Man can collect four different items to aid him in his quest, each having different effects when used. These items can be found by jumping through colored hoops in levels; Pac-Man can hold all four of them at once, but can only use one at a time. Jumping through the hoop a second time will remove the item from the player's inventory. These items are the rope, which can latch onto ceilings and can allow Pac-Man to swing himself to higher places, and can also be used to push objects; the fireball, which allows Pac-Man to spit deadly fireballs at enemies; the hammer, which allows Pac-Man to smash objects; and the swim shoes, which grant Pac-Man the ability to swim underwater. Pac-Man can also replenish his health by eating fruit found throughout levels, and can also find items such as 1-ups in treasure chests, which can be opened by finding a key. In the final level, Pac-Man will face off against the Ghost Witch, and defeating her will allow him to be sent back to the present.

== Development and release ==
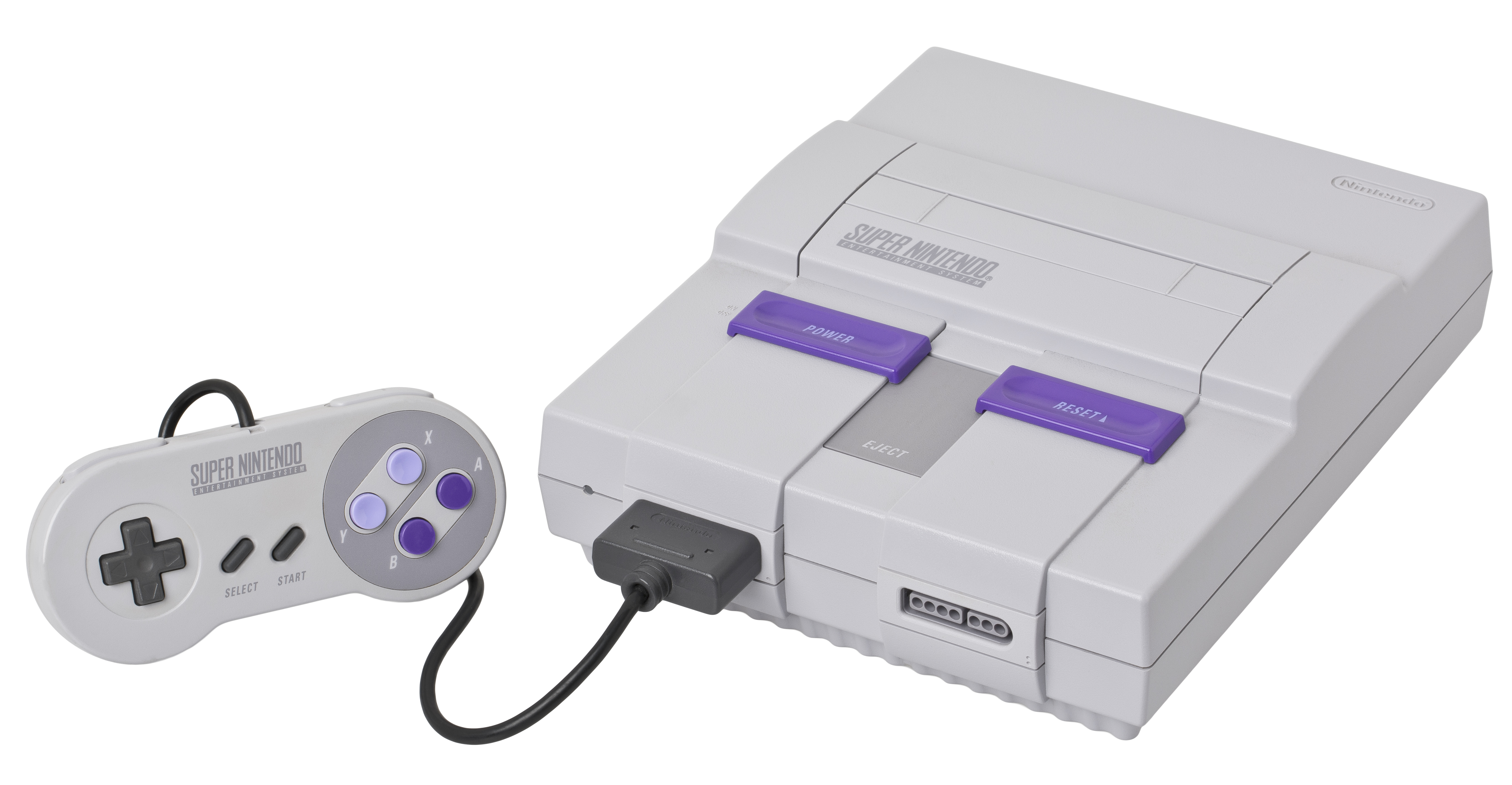
The SNES version of Pac-In-Time is a completely different game compared to other versions, which are simply reskins of Fury of the Furries with Pac-Man characters.

Pac-In-Time was designed by Atreid Concept, a French video game studio headed by business entrepreneur Nicolas Gaume. Assisting production was Namco Hometek, the North American console game division of Japanese company Namco. Namco Hometek also served as the publisher for the game. Pac-In-Time is a reskin and rebranding of Atreid's older game Fury of the Furries, a puzzle platformer originally released for Amiga, Macintosh and MS-DOS in 1994. Namco licensed the game's engine from Mindscape, the parent company of Atreid Concept. Namco, who had attempted to get a foothold into the European game market on multiple occasions, decided to make the game a Pac-Man platformer due to the character's worldwide appeal.

Pac-In-Time was developed for the Super Nintendo Entertainment System (SNES), Game Boy, Mac OS, and MS-DOS. While the Game Boy and computer versions are simply Fury of the Furries with a Pac-Man skin, the SNES version is an entirely new game with altered levels and themes, while still keeping the same mechanics and concepts intact. The Japanese Super Famicom version was changed to be harder than its international counterparts, adding instant-death traps and generally making levels more difficult and challenging. Pac-In-Time was billed as a follow-up to Pac-Man 2: The New Adventures, which was released earlier in 1994.

Pac-In-Time was first released for the SNES and Game Boy in Japan on January 3, 1995. Both versions were released in Europe within the same month, with Mindscape releasing the SNES version and Nintendo releasing the Game Boy version. The SNES version was also released in North America by Namco Hometek in January, with the Game Boy version following a month later. The Macintosh and MS-DOS versions were released by Mindscape in February 1995. The magazine Sega Visions announced a Sega Genesis version of the game slated for an October 1995 release, but this version was never published. A Game Gear version was also cancelled, designed by Gil Espeche; this version was dumped online by the video game preservation group SMS Power in 2005.

An emulated version of the Japanese Super Famicom version is included in the compilation title Pac-Man Museum+. Though the game is emulated, the game is modified to alter the graphics of Pac-Man's family in the introductory and epilogue cutscenes, with Ms. Pac-Man, Baby Pac-Man and Jr. Pac-Man being replaced with the Pac-Mom, Pac-Sis and Pac-Boy characters created for the collection. While not officially stated why the changes were made, news outlets have assumed the changes to be tied with Ms. Pac-Man's ongoing legal dispute with AtGames.

== Reception ==
Reception

Review scores
| Publication | Score |
|---|---|
| Electronic Gaming Monthly | 7.75/10 |
| Famitsu | 24/40 |
| GamePro | 4.5/5 |
| Next Generation | 3/5 |
| Total! Germany | 3/6 |
| VideoGames | 8/10 |

Pac-In-Time was met with a generally favorable reception from publications, and is seen as a unique and innovative title in the Pac-Man series. GamePro magazine commented that it helps represent the character's legacy, and that it was an interesting take on the franchise. The Super Famicom version sold 21,265 copies in its first week on the market.

The game's visuals and presentation were praised by several. Electronic Gaming Monthly liked Pac-Man's cute design and for the game itself having a distinctly-cute style, while also praising the graphics themselves for being bright and colorful, which GamePro agreed with. Reviewing the Game Boy version, Famitsu and Total! Germany said that the graphics had a very cartoony look, but were average for the system. Critics also praised the game's controls and items; GamePro in particular said that together they "breathed new life into a classic character." GamePro and VideoGames both enjoyed the rope item for being fun to use. Electronic Gaming Monthly liked the music but said it became repetitive after a while.

The gameplay was well-received, particularly for its usage of puzzle-solving. GamePro described it as a "fun, fast-paced adventure". Electronic Gaming Monthly said that it "has the makings of a great game" through its pick-up-and-play approach and for the game being generally fun to play. Next Generation and VideoGames agreed, both of whom enjoyed the level design for its usage of puzzle-solving. Famitsu liked the gameplay for being entertaining and the stages for being wide-open and fun to explore, although said that the puzzle-solving can become repetitive after a while. By contrast, Next Generation felt that the level design became repetitive and lack in variety between them, which they stated was the game's only weakness. Most critics felt that the game became too difficult later on, with Electronic Gaming Monthly in particular disliking the learning curve for being overly-high. Total! Germany praised the Game Boy version for its creativity and design, but claimed that its difficulty would put off younger players and only recommended the game towards more dedicated platform fans. Video Games magazine said that Pac-In-Time was a significant step-up in quality compared to the series' previous platform outings, writing: "Pac-Man fans will dig the characters and the familiar theme music at the opening of each stage, but Pac-In-Time really has little to do with the maze game that launched a thousand maze games. However, unlike Pac-Land - a previous attempt to blend the Pac-Man universe with a platform-game scenario - this one is a pleasantly addictive romp that knows just how to tease players into coming back for more."
