= Savage Warriors =

1995 video game

- Developer(s): Atreid Concept
- Publisher(s): Mindscape
- Platform(s): MS-DOS
- Release: 1995

Savage Warriors is a video game developed by French studio Atreid Concept and published by Mindscape for MS-DOS.

== Gameplay ==
Savage Warriors is a two dimensional fighting game in which the characters have the ability to hang from items in the background.

== Reception ==
Next Generation reviewed the PC version of the game, rating it three stars out of five, and stated that "if you're looking for 2D fighting on the PC, Savage Warriors is a very competent effort."
