= Nightmare Creatures II =

2000 video game

- Developer: Kalisto Entertainment
- Publisher: Konami
- Programmer: Stéphane Le Dorze
- Artist: Pascal Barret
- Composer: Frédéric Motte
- Platforms: PlayStation, Dreamcast
- Release: NA: 23 May 2000 (PS); NA: 13 June 2000 (DC); EU: 8 September 2000
- Genre: Survival horror
- Mode: Single-player

Nightmare Creatures II is a 2000 survival horror video game developed by Kalisto Entertainment and published by Konami for the PlayStation and Dreamcast. It is the sequel to Nightmare Creatures.

== Plot ==
In 1934, exactly one century after the previous game, Adam Crowley, an occultist and antagonist from the previous game, has created a vast race of mutant creatures, which he is using to wipe out a group of monster hunters called the Circle. Meanwhile, Herbert Wallace, a patient at Crowley's genetics hospital, escapes from captivity, armed with an axe. He arrives in London, where he discovers evidence of a picture of Ignatius Blackward who, with Nadia Franciscus, had defeated Crowley in the previous game. Thanks to Rachel, the only surviving member of the Circle, Wallace is rescued from fire. They head their separate ways, with Wallace venturing to Crowley's castle, only to discover that Crowley himself is not there, but in Paris.

He then falls down a chute, which leads to a biplane that he flies to France. Wallace enters a cinema, where he finds a note from Rachel informing him that she knows of Crowley's plans. He then proceeds onwards to a museum to meet up with Rachel, but unknown to Wallace, she has been captured by zombies. Wallace then enters the museum, where he finds a detailed blueprint of the Eiffel Tower, along with some of Crowley's plans. Wallace enters a crypt, but zombies surround him and he plants one head first into a wall, escapes in a car while another zombie attacks him from behind and crashes in an elaborate graveyard, where he finds a part of Rachel's shirt snagged on a tree.

Wallace departs from the graveyard and falls into a sewer, which in turn takes him to the Paris underground, where he finds evidence of documents of ancient cults and a passage that leads to the Eiffel Tower. He then climbs to the top of the structure, where he finds a grotesque monstrosity. Using dynamite, he explodes the creature, only for the explosion to throw him off the top of the spire. However, his fall is cushioned, and he is reunited with Rachel, whereupon they walk away together. Whether Crowley is plotting his next scheme or gone forever remains completely unknown.

== Gameplay ==
The gameplay is similar to the previous installment, seeing the adrenaline bar abandoned and the addition of fatality moves to execute weakened enemies. Unlike the previous game though, Herbert is the only playable character and the unlockable ability to play as a monster is absent.

== Music ==
The North American PlayStation release featured licensed music from Rob Zombie's albums Hellbilly Deluxe and American Made Music to Strip By in the cutscenes, while the original soundtrack was composed by Frédéric Motte.

== Reception ==
Reception

Aggregate score
Aggregator	Score	
Aggregator	Dreamcast	PS
GameRankings	49%	64%

Review scores
Publication	Score	
Publication	Dreamcast	PS
AllGame	2.5/5	3/5
CNET Gamecenter	3/10	8/10
Electronic Gaming Monthly	N/A	4.83/10 (Note: Three critics of Electronic Gaming Monthly gave the PlayStation version each a score of 4/10, 4.5/10, and 6/10.)
EP Daily	5/10	7.5/10
Game Informer	5/10	5.25/10
GameFan	N/A	(MVS) 64% 58% (Note: In GameFan's viewpoint of the PlayStation version, three critics gave it each a score of 55, 49, and 71.)
GameRevolution	F	C−
GameSpot	5.9/10	5.3/10
GameSpy	4/10	N/A
IGN	5/10	8.3/10
Next Generation	2/5	N/A
Official U.S. PlayStation Magazine	N/A	2/5

The PlayStation version of Nightmare Creatures II received "mixed" reviews, while the Dreamcast version received "unfavorable" reviews, according to the review aggregation website GameRankings. Greg Orlando of NextGen quoted a song by Carly Simon, "You're So Vain", in saying of the latter console version, "Konami's 'dream' turns out to be nothing but 'clouds in our coffee.'"

Uncle Dust of GamePro said that the PlayStation version "certainly earns its 'Mature' rating with plenty of blood and severed body parts, so it may not be for everyone. PlayStation horror fans, though, will find it a terrific, sharp-looking and -sounding action/adventure game." He also said, "While the visuals are certainly more impressive than the PlayStation version's, the Dreamcast version of Nightmare Creatures II remains otherwise almost identical—which is a good thing, because the PlayStation Nightmare Creatures II is a great game." (Note: GamePro gave both the PlayStation and Dreamcast versions each two 4.5/5 scores for graphics and fun factor, 5/5 for sound, and 3/5 for control.) However, 2 Barrel Fugue said of the Dreamcast version in another GamePro review, "If you're the type of person who gets a kick out of exercises in futility, then Nightmare Creatures II is for you. If not, back away slowly and, when it's not looking, run like hell." (Note: GamePro gave the Dreamcast version 4/5 for graphics, and three 2/5 scores for sound, control, and fun factor in another review.) The Electric Playground gave the PlayStation version a favorable review while it was still in development.
