= Ultimate Race Pro =

1998 video game

- Developer: Kalisto Entertainment
- Publisher: MicroProse
- Platform: Microsoft Windows
- Release: NA: March 17, 1998; UK: March 20, 1998
- Genre: Racing
- Modes: Single-player, multiplayer

Ultimate Race Pro (stylized as Ultim@te Race Pro) is a racing video game developed by Kalisto Entertainment and published by MicroProse for Windows in 1998. It was bundled with PowerVR boards.

== Gameplay ==
The game allows a selection of 16 cars, 6 tracks, and weather choices. Players can play individually, versus the computer, or in multiplayer. When playing against the PC (8 opponents), players can choose between easy, normal, and hard difficulty.

== Development ==
The game was showcased at E3 1997.

== Critical reception ==
Reception

Aggregate score
Aggregator	Score
GameRankings	83%

Review scores
Publication	Score
CNET Gamecenter	8/10
Computer Gaming World	3/5
Edge	6/10
Game Informer	8/10
GameSpot	7.8/10
GameStar	77%
Hyper	80%
IGN	7/10
Next Generation	4/5
PC Gamer (US)	88%
PC Zone	88%
The Cincinnati Enquirer	4.5/5

The game received favorable reviews according to the review aggregation website GameRankings. Next Generation called it "a great experience for all PC race drivers."

The game sold over 1 million units worldwide.
