= The Fifth Element (video game) =

1998 video game

- North American PlayStation box art
- Developer: Kalisto Entertainment
- Publishers: NA: Activision; EU: Sony Computer Entertainment; EU: Ubi Soft (PC)
- Composer: Frédéric Motte
- Platforms: PlayStation, Windows
- Release: PlayStation: JP: 23 September 1998; NA: 1 October 1998; EU: October 1998; Windows: NA: October 1998; EU: 1998
- Genre: Action-adventure
- Mode: Single-player

The Fifth Element (French: Le Cinquième Élément) is a 1998 action-adventure video game developed by Kalisto Entertainment for the PlayStation and Microsoft Windows. It is based on the film of the same name.

== Gameplay ==
In the game, the player controls Leeloo and Korben, fighting against the police and the Mangalores, as well as Zorg and his thugs. The game has 16 levels, or missions, as they are called in-game. Short clips from the film are played at the completion of certain levels.

Control switches between the two main characters, dependent on the level. Each character has different combat abilities; Korben uses guns with unlimited ammunition and Leelo uses unarmed combat techniques supplemented by grenades which can be collected.

== Development ==
The production company behind the film, Gaumont, assisted in the game's design. The game had a budget of $1.7 million.

The Windows and PlayStation versions were developed in tandem, with LibSys, a proprietary development program created by Kalisto, used to build both versions. The game was demonstrated at the June 1997 Electronic Entertainment Expo; at this time, Korben was still not playable, only Leeloo, and Kalisto had not yet settled on a publisher for the game.

== Reception ==
Reception

Aggregate score
Aggregator	Score	
Aggregator	PC	PS
GameRankings	N/A	32%

Review scores
Publication	Score	
Publication	PC	PS
AllGame	N/A	2/5
Electronic Gaming Monthly	N/A	2.1/10
Game Informer	N/A	7/10
GamePro	N/A	3.5/5
GameRevolution	N/A	F
GameSpot	N/A	2.4/10
IGN	N/A	5/10
Next Generation	N/A	2/5
Official U.S. PlayStation Magazine	N/A	0.5/5
PC Zone	82%	N/A
Play	N/A	50%

Next Generation reviewed the PlayStation version of the game, rating it two stars out of five, and stated that "There's some mild entertainment to be had here, but only if you're willing to overlook the shortcomings - and frankly, these are legion. Don't expect many fresh surprises, or for that matter, much fun."

The PlayStation version held a score of 32% on GameRankings based on 7 reviews.

GameSpot gave the game 2.4 out of 10, with the reviewer calling it "quite possibly the worst game I've ever played". Game Revolution gave the game an "F" rating, concluding "Poor level design... boring puzzles... it just never ends, but I can't go on. Let me sum it up by saying that The Fifth Element is simply not fun to play. Not even a little bit." IGN gave the game 5 out of 10, stating "All in all, this adventure/action game does what all of the other games in the genre do, but not in any way better." The only positive reviews came from GamePro, which gave the game three-and-a-half stars out of five, and from Game Informer, which gave the game 7 out of 10, but quipped that "Unfortunately, the control is cumbersome, the camera sometimes jumps or sticks, and the enemies prove to be rather dumb. Rent it first, but if you really like the movie, you'll probably like the game too."

The PC Version received positive reception, and PC Zone gave the game a score of 82%.

The game sold 750,000 copies worldwide.
