= NYR: New York Race =

2001 video game

- Developer: Kalisto Entertainment
- Publisher: Wanadoo Edition
- Platforms: Game Boy Color; Windows; PlayStation 2
- Release: EU: 16 November 2001 (GBC, WIN); EU: 23 November 2001 (PS2)
- Genre: racing
- Modes: Single-player, multiplayer

NYR: New York Race, also known as simply New York Race, is a 2001 science fiction racing game based on the film The Fifth Element by Luc Besson. It was developed by Kalisto Entertainment and released for Windows, PlayStation 2 and Game Boy Color. Many of the characters from the film are playable, including characters that did not have a significant role in the film, and lacked names.

== Gameplay ==
The player may choose between 25 unlockable vehicles, each with their own unique advantages and disadvantages, which fit into three categories:

- Speeders have good acceleration but weak shields.
- Hovercars are general 'all round' vehicles.
- Cruisers are very slow, but have extremely good shielding.

In the game, New York is set not only to be large horizontally, it is also set to be large vertically for the city is several miles high as well as a few miles wide. Within the game, There are also 12 different courses around New York City, each being grouped into one of the four district groups which are:

- Middle Class: Set in the middle parts of New York, fairly lively with middle class businesses and fairly bright.
- Jet Set: Around the top of New York's very high towers bearing beautiful aesthetics, being quite lively and really bright.
- The Slums: The base of New York's great towers, they consist of dirty areas such as Sewers or Dumps, they are very dark and foggy and hardly any traffic ever goes in the areas of this district group.
- Chinatown: The Chinese district group of the city, bearing lively streets, very beautiful aesthetics and contains some parts of slight darkness and fair brightness.

== Reception ==
Eurogamer gave the game 6 out of 10.
