= Al Unser Jr. Arcade Racing =

1995 video game

- Windows version cover
- Developer: Mindscape Bordeaux
- Publisher: Mindscape
- Director: Thierry Robin
- Producer: Nicolas Gaume
- Programmers: Gabriel Rabhi; Philippe Bachelet; Daniel Mike Polydore
- Composer: Frédéric Motte
- Platforms: Windows, Mac OS
- Release: September 7, 1995
- Genre: Racing
- Modes: Single-player, multiplayer

Al Unser Jr. Arcade Racing is a racing computer video game for the Windows and Mac OS operating systems, released in 1995 by publisher Mindscape and developed by its subsidiary, Mindscape Bordeaux.

== Gameplay ==
The game allows a selection of 10 open wheel cars and 15 tracks. There are three racing options that the player can choose; circuit (with the tracks going in numerical order being chosen automatically by the computer), time limit trial (where the player has to race in a time limit, but go through checkpoints in order to get extended time. However, unlike the circuit race, the player can choose their own track), and a simple practice course where the player and their car race solo with the player selecting their own track.

== Reception ==
Reception

Review scores
| Publication | Score |
|---|---|
| Computer Gaming World | 3/5 |
| Computer Game Review | 76/81/77 |

Al Unser Jr. Arcade Racing was a commercial hit, with sales of 1 million units by May 1998.

Computer Gaming World gave the game 3 out of 5 stars. They praised its graphics and gameplay but thought there was not enough depth to keep players interested in the game.

== See also ==
- Al Unser Jr.
