= Centre national du cinéma et de l'image animée =

French cinematic agency

- Formation: 1960; 66 years ago
- Headquarters: Paris, France
- President: Gaëtan Bruel
- Website: www.cnc.fr (in French)

The Centre national du cinéma et de l'image animée (French pronunciation: [sɑ̃tʁ nɑsjɔnal dy sinema e də limaʒ anime]; CNC; transl. National Centre for Cinema and the Moving Image) is an agency of the French Ministry of Culture, and is responsible for the production and promotion of cinematic and audiovisual arts in France. The CNC is a publicly owned establishment, with legal and financial autonomy.

It was created by law on 25 October 1946 as the Centre national de la cinématographie (National Centre for Cinematography), it is currently directed by Gaëtan Bruel. The CNC replaced the Office professionnel du cinéma (OPC), its predecessor established during the reign of Vichy France for wartime censorship.

The CNC archives are located in the former Fort de Bois-d'Arcy southwest of Paris. Initially established in 1969 to house combustible nitrate films, the archives now house modern acetate films as well. The CNC has between 700 and 800 million dollars each year to support French projects.

== Functions ==
The principal functions of the CNC are:

- Regulation of cinema
- Support of the economy of the cinema, audiovisual, and multimedia arts
- Promotion of cinema and audiovisual arts among the public
- Protection of French cinematographic heritage

== List of presidents ==
- Michel Fourré-Cormeray (1945–1952)
- Jacques Flaud (1952–1959)
- Michel Fourré-Cormeray (1959–1965)
- André Holleaux (1965–1969)
- André Astoux (1969–1973)
- Pierre Viot (1973–1984)
- Jérôme Clément (1984–1989)
- Dominique Wallon (1989–1995)
- Marc Tessier (1995–1999)
- Jean-Pierre Hoss (1999–2001)
- David Kessler (2001–2004)
- Catherine Colonna (2004–2005)
- Véronique Cayla (2005–2010)
- Éric Garandeau (2011–2013)
- Frédérique Bredin (2013–2019)
- Olivier Henrard (July 2019 - interim)
- Dominique Boutonnat (July 2019 - current)

== See also ==
- Institut national de l'audiovisuel
- Europa Cinemas
- French video game policy
