= The Fifth Element =

1997 film by Luc Besson

- US theatrical release poster
- French: Le Cinquième Élément
- Directed by: Luc Besson
- Screenplay by: Luc Besson; Robert Mark Kamen
- Story by: Luc Besson
- Produced by: Patrice Ledoux
- Starring: Bruce Willis; Gary Oldman; Ian Holm; Chris Tucker; Milla Jovovich
- Cinematography: Thierry Arbogast
- Edited by: Sylvie Landra
- Music by: Éric Serra
- Production company: Gaumont
- Distributed by: Gaumont Buena Vista International
- Release date: 7 May 1997 (France)
- Running time: 126 minutes
- Country: France
- Language: English
- Budget: $90 million
- Box office: $263.9 million

The Fifth Element (French: Le Cinquième Élément) is a 1997 English-language French science fiction-action film conceived and directed by Luc Besson, and written by Besson and Robert Mark Kamen. It stars Bruce Willis, Milla Jovovich, Gary Oldman, Ian Holm, and Chris Tucker. Primarily set in the 23rd century, the plot involves the survival of planet Earth, which becomes the responsibility of Korben Dallas (Willis), a taxi driver and former special forces major, after a young woman named Leeloo (Jovovich) falls into his cab. Dallas joins forces with her to recover four mystical stones essential for the defence of Earth against the impending attack of a malevolent cosmic entity.

Besson started writing the story that was developed as The Fifth Element when he was 16 years old; he was 38 when the film opened in cinemas. Besson wanted to shoot the film in France, but suitable facilities could not be found. Filming took place in London and Mauritania, instead. He hired comic artists Jean "Moebius" Giraud and Jean-Claude Mézières, whose books inspired parts of the film, for production design. Costume design was by Jean Paul Gaultier.

The Fifth Element received mainly positive reviews, although some critics were highly negative. The film won in categories at the British Academy Film Awards, the César Awards, the Cannes Film Festival, and the Lumière Awards, but also received nominations at the Golden Raspberry and Stinkers Bad Movie Awards. The Fifth Element was a strong financial success, earning more than US$263 million at the box office on a $90-million budget, making it the ninth highest-grossing film of 1997. At the time of its release, it was the most expensive European film ever made, and it remained the highest-grossing French film at the international box office until the release of The Intouchables in 2011.

== Plot ==
In 1914, aliens known as Mondoshawans meet their contact on Earth, a priest of a secret order, at an ancient Egyptian temple. They take the only weapon capable of defeating a great evil that appears every 5,000 years, promising to protect it and return it before the great evil's re-emergence. The weapon consists of the four classical elements, as four engraved stones, plus a sarcophagus containing a "fifth element".

In the 23rd century, (Note: The film's opening scene states that the year is 1914 and the following scene in space states that it is "300 years later". Korben's alarm clock shows the year as 2263. The year is given as 2257 on the DVD sleeve notes published by Pathé in 1997 and as 2259 by Besson in The Story of The Fifth Element.) the great evil appears in deep space as a giant living fireball. It destroys an armed Earth spaceship as it heads to Earth. The Mondoshawans' human contact on Earth, priest Vito Cornelius, informs the president of the Federated Territories of the great evil's history and the weapon that can stop it.

On their way to Earth, a Mondoshawan spacecraft carrying the weapon is ambushed and destroyed by a crew of Mangalores, alien mercenaries hired by Earth industrialist Jean-Baptiste Emanuel Zorg, who is working for the great evil. A severed hand in metal armor from the wreckage of the spacecraft is brought to New York City. From this, the government uses biotechnology to recreate the original occupant of the sarcophagus, a humanoid woman named Leeloo, who remembers her previous life. Alarmed by the unfamiliar surroundings and high security, she escapes and jumps off a ledge, crashing into the flying taxicab of Korben Dallas, a former major in Earth's special forces.

Dallas delivers Leeloo to Cornelius and his apprentice, David, who recognises her as the fifth element. As Leeloo recuperates, she tells Cornelius that the stones were not on board the Mondoshawan ship. Simultaneously, the Mondoshawans inform Earth's government that the stones were entrusted to an alien opera singer, the diva Plavalaguna. Zorg reneges on his deal with the Mangalores for failing to obtain the stones and kills some of them. Earth's military sends Dallas to meet Plavalaguna; a rigged radio contest provides a cover, awarding Dallas a luxury vacation aboard a flying hotel on planet Fhloston, accompanied by flamboyant talk-show host Ruby Rhod. It includes a concert by Plavalaguna, and learning that Leeloo shares his mission, Dallas lets her accompany him. Cornelius instructs David to prepare the temple, then stows away on the luxury spaceship. The Mangalore crew, pursuing the stones for themselves, also illegally board the ship.

During the concert, the Mangalores attack, and Plavalaguna is killed. Dallas extracts the stones from her body and kills the Mangalore leader, causing the others to surrender. Zorg arrives, shoots Leeloo, and activates a time bomb. He flees with a carrying case, which he presumes contains the stones, but returns when he discovers that it is empty. As Zorg's bomb causes the hotel's evacuation, Dallas finds Leeloo traumatised and escapes with her, Cornelius, Rhod, and the stones in Zorg's private spaceship. Zorg deactivates his bomb, but a dying Mangalore sets off his own, destroying the hotel and killing Zorg.

As the great evil approaches Earth, the four meet David at the temple. They deploy the stones, but Leeloo, having learned of humanity's history of cruelty, has given up on life. Dallas declares his love for her and kisses her. Leeloo combines the power of the stones, emitting divine light onto the great evil and defeating it. Dallas and Leeloo are hailed as heroes, and as dignitaries wait to greet them, the two passionately embrace in a recovery chamber.

== Cast ==
- Bruce Willis as Korben Dallas
- Gary Oldman as Jean-Baptiste Emanuel Zorg
- Ian Holm as Vito Cornelius
- Milla Jovovich as Leeloo
- Chris Tucker as Ruby Rhod
- Luke Perry as Billy Masterson
- Brion James as General Munro
- Tommy "Tiny" Lister Jr. as President Lindberg
- Lee Evans as Fog
- Charlie Creed-Miles as David
- Tricky as Right Arm
- John Neville as General Staedert
- John Bluthal as Professor Pacoli
- Maïwenn Le Besco as Diva Plavalaguna
  - Inva Mula provides Diva's singing voice

== Themes ==
In an interview, Besson stated, The Fifth Element was not a "big theme movie", although the film's theme was an important one. He wanted viewers to reach the point where Leeloo states, "What's the use of saving life when you see what you do with it?" and agree with her. Jay P. Telotte, writing in the book Science Fiction Film, credited the film with exploring the theme of political corruption.

Brian Ott and Eric Aoki writing in the feminist journal Women's Studies in Communication considered gender to be one of the film's central themes. The authors criticised the film for erasing women from the introductory scenes, noting that only two appear in the first 20 minutes: an androgynous, mostly speechless presidential aide and Leeloo, undergoing reconstruction. When females appear in the film, they are presented as passive objects, such as the sexualised flight and McDonald's attendants, or stripped of their femininity, such as the "butch" Major Iceborg.

Stefan Brandt, in the book Subverting Masculinity, also said that the film "echoes stereotypical beliefs about gender" of all females in the film. He said that Leeloo left her passive role only during her fight with the Mangalores. Except for Tiny Lister's portrayal of the president, Brandt said that all males in the film were shown as unmanly as possible in various ways, such as Ruby Rhod's effeminacy, Vito Cornelius's clumsy form of speech, and General Munro's stupidity; their purpose was to make Korben's masculinity appear "god-like" by comparison.

In the book The Films of Luc Besson, Susan Hayward considered The Fifth Element to be a classic story of a man "making his break from the tribe, proving his manhood, overthrowing the malevolent forces, and killing the chief, finally to reap the rewards of security and marriage". Korben's journey is threatened not only by the Mangalores and Zorg, but also by Leeloo, who does not relent or help him until the last minute, when she accepts his declaration of love. The love story within The Fifth Element was considered one of the main narratives in the film, and it faces the same deadline as the main storyline.

Hayward had the film grapple with environmental damage, with waste and pollution visible throughout the film. Whereas science-fiction films often show a world wherein some new technology or threat either surpasses or fails humanity, The Films of Luc Besson included The Fifth Element among the minority of science-fiction films that "hold up a mirror" and show humankind as responsible. Hayward said the film was sceptical of capitalist consumerism, in so far as the gadgets Zorg collected in his office suggested that he had an unhealthy obsession for technology. The tension between technology and man is treated as a problem requiring a final resolution.

== Production ==
=== Development ===
As a teenager, Besson envisioned the world of The Fifth Element in an attempt to alleviate boredom. He began writing the script when he was 16, originally envisioning the story as a novel, with the film released in cinemas when he was 38. The original story was set in the year 2300 and was about a "nobody" named Zaltman Bleros, later renamed Korben Dallas, who wins a trip to the Club Med resort on the planet Fhloston Paradise in the Angel constellation. There, he meets Leeloo, a "sand-girl" who has the "beauty of youth" despite being over 2,000 years old. The name of the character Diva Plavalaguna was likely derived from the Plava Laguna resort in Poreč, Croatia, where Besson had vacationed several times.

Besson continued to work on the story for years. By 1991, when his documentary film Atlantis was released, he had a 400-page script. Nicolas Seydoux and Patrice Ledoux from Gaumont were the first people to take on the project. In November 1991, while seeking actors for the film, Besson met French comic creators Jean Giraud and Jean-Claude Mézières and recruited them for the film's production design. Giraud and Mézières's comics inspired the look that Besson wanted for his futuristic New York City.

=== Designs ===
Mézières had designed The Circles of Power (1994), which contains a character named S'Traks, who drives a flying taxicab through the congested air of the vast metropolis on the planet Rubanis. Mézières showed images of the flying taxi to Besson, who was inspired to change Korben Dallas' background from a worker in a rocket-ship factory to a taxi driver who flies his cab around a Rubanis-inspired futuristic New York City. Besson's production also hired five other artists for the project. In addition, noted fashion designer Jean Paul Gaultier was hired to create the costumes. The team spent a year creating more than 8,000 drawings.

=== Casting ===
During this time, Besson approached both Bruce Willis and Mel Gibson for the lead role, and also considered Julia Roberts for Leeloo. Willis expressed interest, though he was reluctant to take on the role as the film was considered risky after his previous two films, Hudson Hawk and Billy Bathgate, had been poorly received. Gibson eventually turned down the role. For the character Leeloo, Besson chose Milla Jovovich from the 200–300 applicants he met in person, which included Elizabeth Berkley and Diane Kruger. While the production team impressed film companies with their designs, they struggled to find one willing to take on a budget approaching nearly $100 million. (Note: Conflicting sources stated the film's budget to be various figures between US$50 million and $100 million. The most frequently cited figure and also the figure cited by Besson in his book, The Story of The Fifth Element is $90 million.) In December 1992, production stopped without any prior warning, and the team disbanded.

Korben's flying taxicab (top), which was inspired by the comic album The Circles of Power (bottom), drawn by artist Jean-Claude Mézières.

Besson wrote and directed the commercially successful Léon: The Professional (1994). During that period, he continued to work on the script for The Fifth Element, shortening it. He reduced the film's budget to $90 million before again attempting to find a studio willing to produce it. Columbia Pictures, which had a partnership in Leon, agreed to finance the film. By this time, Besson had decided to go with a lesser-known lead actor to save on production costs. Besson happened to be in Barry Josephson's office when Willis called regarding a different film. Besson asked to speak to Willis "just to say hello" and told him that The Fifth Element was finally going ahead, explaining his decision to go with a less-expensive actor. After a short silence, Willis said, "If I like the film, we can always come to an arrangement." After reading the script, Willis agreed to take on the role.

=== Filming ===
Production began in early August 1995. Besson travelled to various places for casting, including Paris, London, and Rome. He hired Gary Oldman (who had starred in Léon) for the role of Zorg, describing Oldman as "one of the top-five actors in the world".

The "Divine Language" spoken by Leeloo is a fictional language of 400 words, invented by Besson. To practice, Jovovich and Besson held conversations and exchanged letters in the language. Besson was then married to Maïwenn Le Besco, who played the role of the Diva Plavalaguna when filming began. He left her to take up with Jovovich during filming. Jovovich and Besson later married but divorced two years later in 1999.

Although he wanted to shoot in France, Besson was unable to find suitable facilities, so he filmed in London. It was primarily filmed at Pinewood Studios on seven soundstages including the 007 Stage. Construction of sets began in October 1995. The opera scene was filmed at the Royal Opera House. Scenes depicted as being in Egypt were filmed in Mauritania; the first shoot, a background shot of the desert, occurred there on 5 January 1996. Filming with actors began in late January, and was completed 21 weeks later. Willis finished filming on 16 May, while Oldman only commenced filming the following week; the protagonist (Korben) and antagonist (Zorg) never actually share any screen time. Despite being filmed in London, The Fifth Element was a French production, the costliest European film ever made at the time.

The New York designs were derived from both metabolist-inspired masses of modular apartments from the 1960s and the futuristic designs of architect Antonio Sant'Elia in the 1910s. Besson demanded that most of the action shots take place in broad daylight, as he was reportedly tired of the dark spaceship corridors and dimly lit planets common in science-fiction films, and wanted a brighter, "cheerfully crazy" look as opposed to a gloomy, realistic one.

Gaultier designed each of the 900 costumes worn by extras in the Fhloston Paradise scenes and checked each costume every morning. His designs, described as "intellectually transgressive", were said to challenge sexuality and gender norms. A single jacket he designed cost $5,000. Jovovich's costume worn from when her character was first revived was inspired by typical hospital dressing and bandages that provided minimal modesty.

The original name of the character Ruby Rhod was Loc Rhod, which appears both in the original script and in the novel adapted from the film. Hayward speculated that the name change was a play on data in the periodic table. Rubidium is the first of the period 5 elements, and exactly halfway along that row is the element rhodium. Using the first half of each element yields "Rubi Rhod". Others have speculated this name is a play on the character's gender-bending persona, with a feminine first name and phallic surname. Musician Prince was originally cast to portray Rhod, but could not schedule filming around his Jam of the Year World Tour dates. Chris Tucker and Jamie Foxx were each considered for the role; Besson liked Foxx, but felt that Tucker's smaller body suited the character better.

=== Effects ===
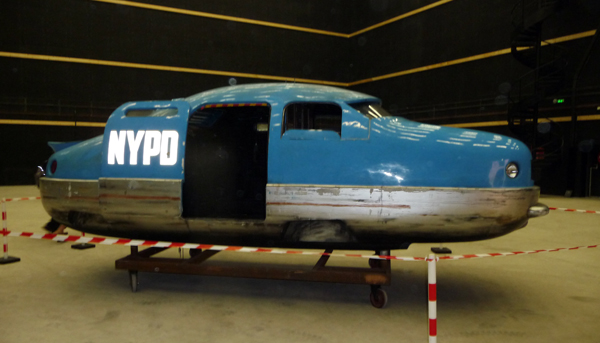
One of the models used to portray an NYPD car in the film

Three different teams handled the three different types of special effects used. Nick Allder directed mechanical and pyrotechnical effects, Nick Dudman was placed in charge of 'creature' effects, and Mark Stetson headed the visual-effects team. Visual effects company Digital Domain was hired, and Karen Goulekas was given the role of digital-effects supervisor. Alias, Autodesk Softimage, Arete, Side Effect's Prisms, RenderMan, and in-house software were used by Digital Domain to create effects. Some individual shots used a combination of live action, scale models, computer-generated imagery, and particle systems. The lanes of traffic in the New York City scenes were created with particle systems:

"We had maybe 80 cityscape shots with CG cars hurtling around, and you couldn't animate them all by hand because there were just too many of them in each scene ... When the cars turned a corner, the velocity changes were automatic, so the animator didn't have to worry about that. They just planned the moves in a very blocky way, and the mathematics smoothed out the rest."

— Karen Goulekas

Among the scale models used for filming were the buildings representing New York City. Dozens of apartment blocks and 25 skyscrapers, some 20 feet (6.1 m) high, were constructed in 1/24 scale. It took a team of 80 workers five months to build all the models. The windows of the buildings were cited by the team as one of the most time-consuming tasks, along with details behind the windows, such as furniture, blinds, lightboxes, and tiny pieces of flat artwork. Virtual sets built within digital environments were created to enhance the use of miniatures. Motion-control cameras moved throughout the scale sets, and the data they collected were exported to track and generate the computer animation and particle systems. Other techniques used included digital matte paintings for backgrounds and the NURBS mathematical model for certain animations, including the sequence in which Leeloo's body is reconstructed.

Models and props used in the film
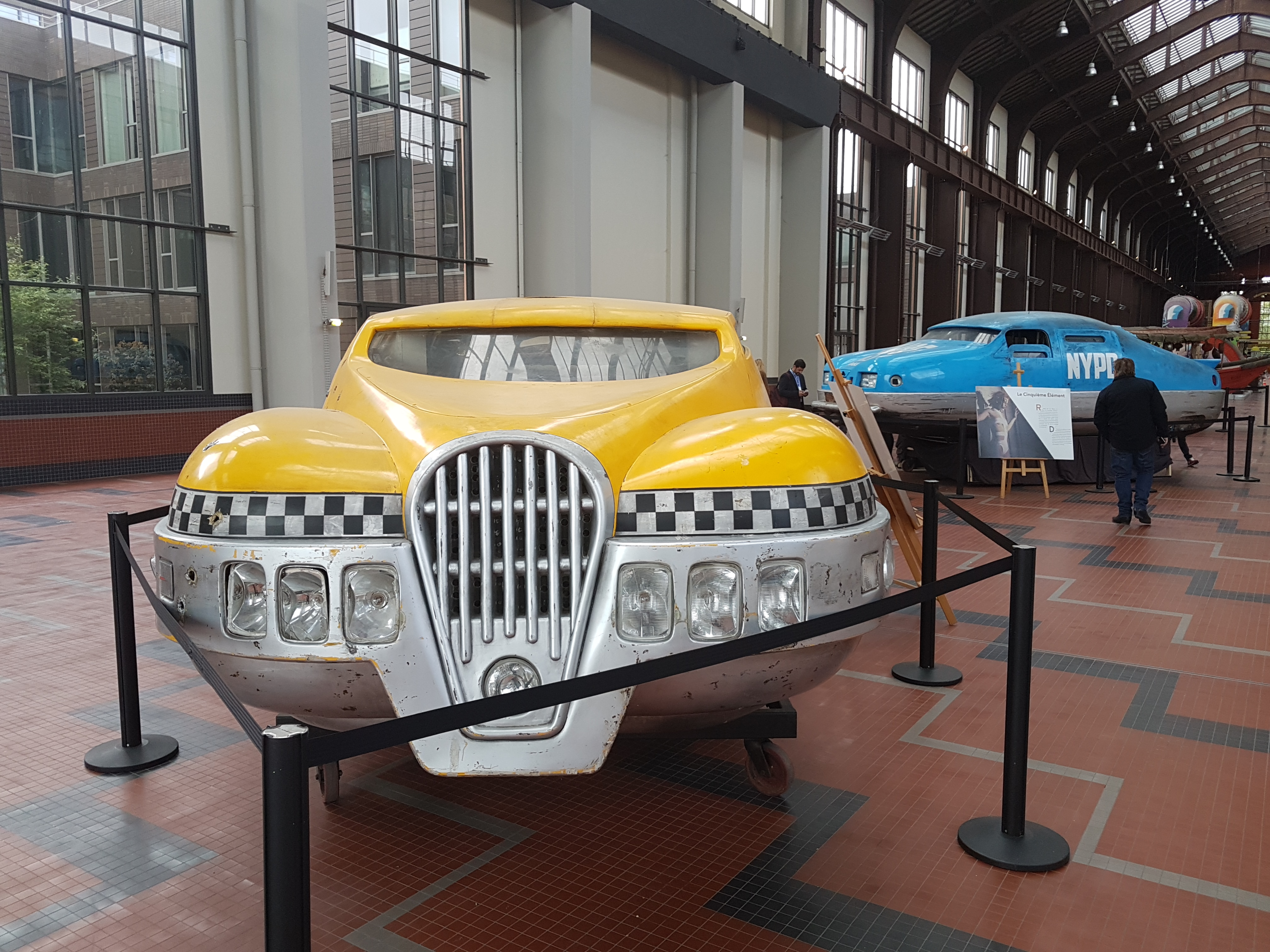
Cars of the film on display in Paris for the 20th anniversary

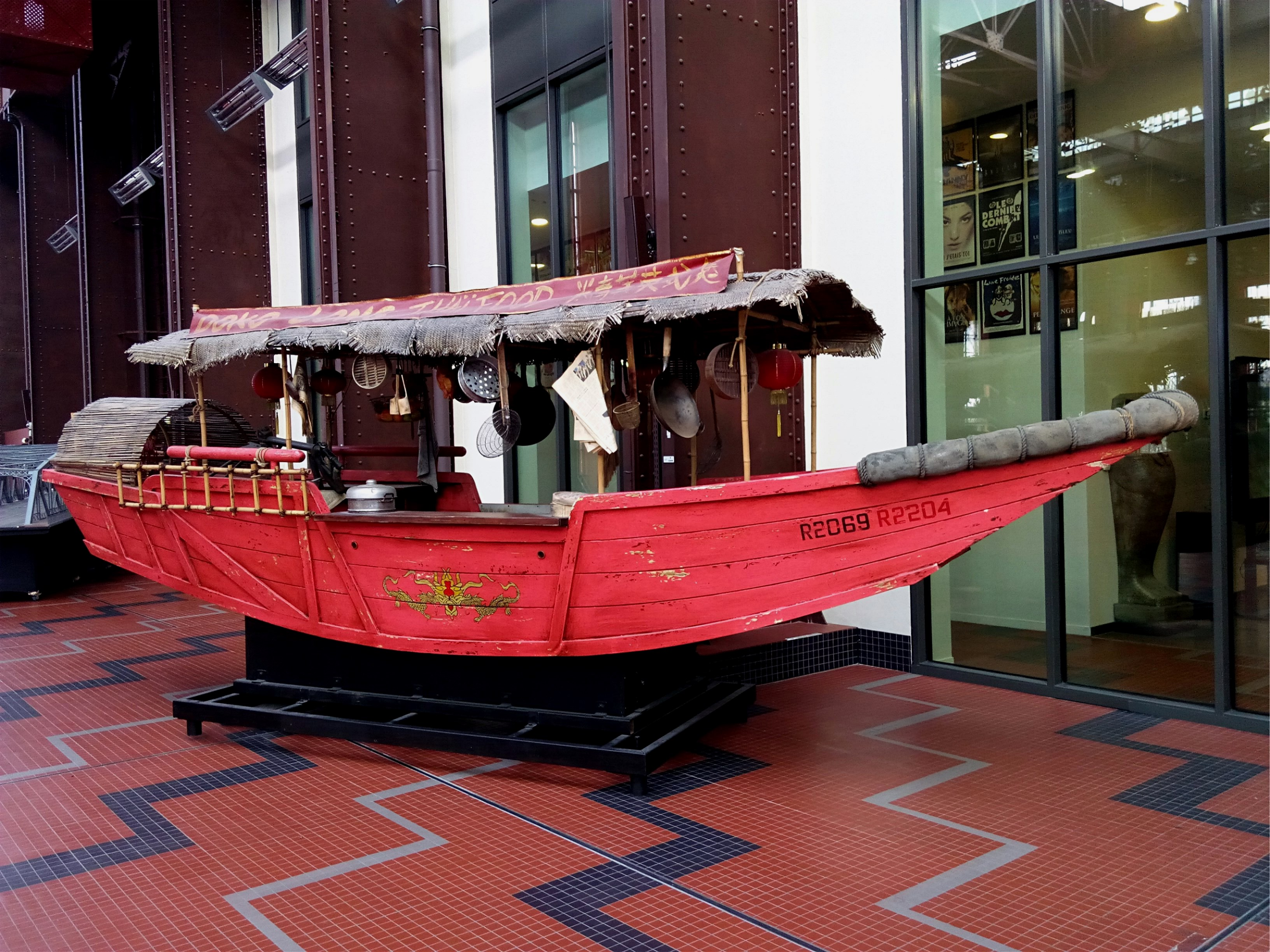
Mr. Kim's flying restaurant

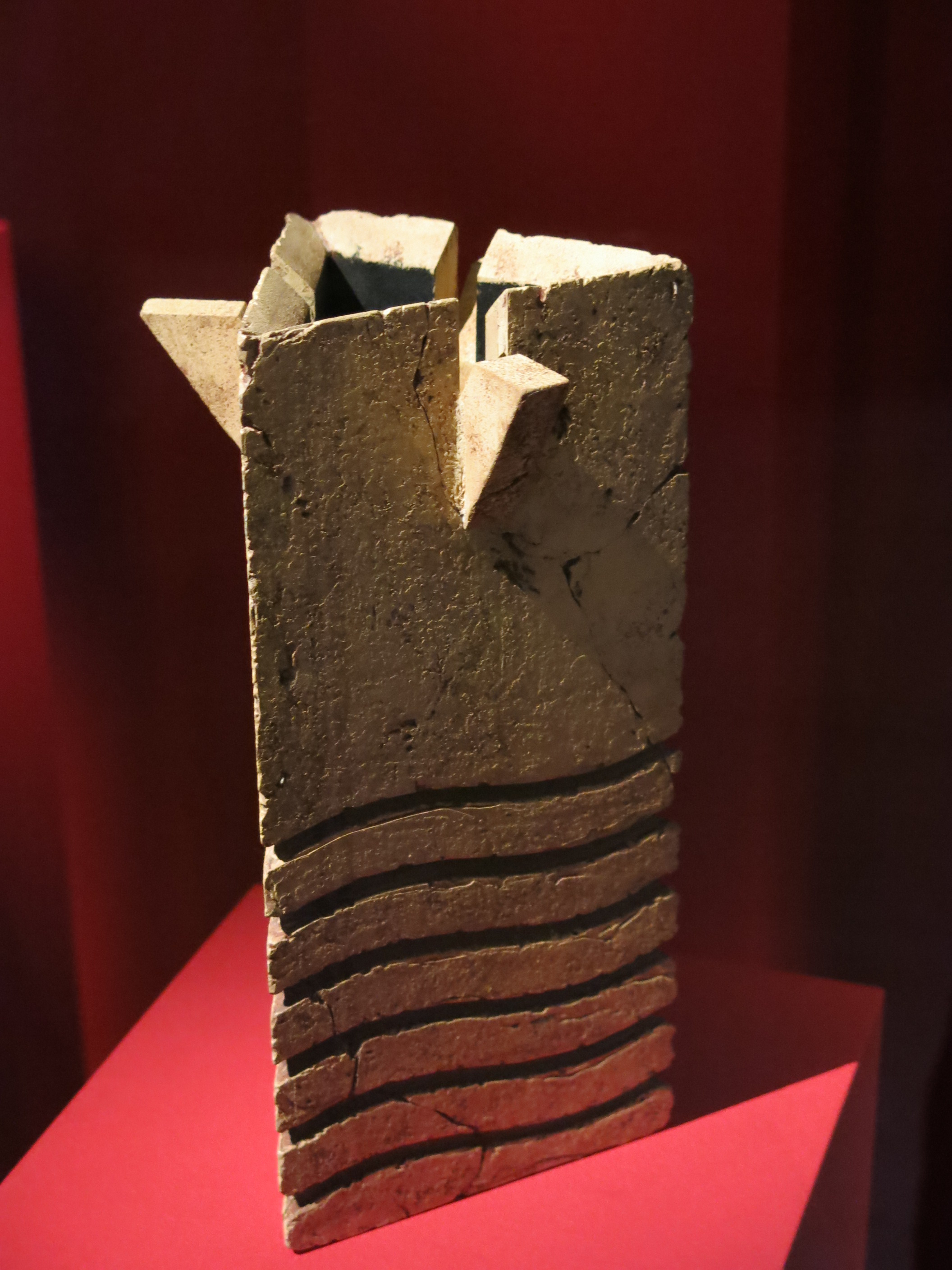
The water elemental stone

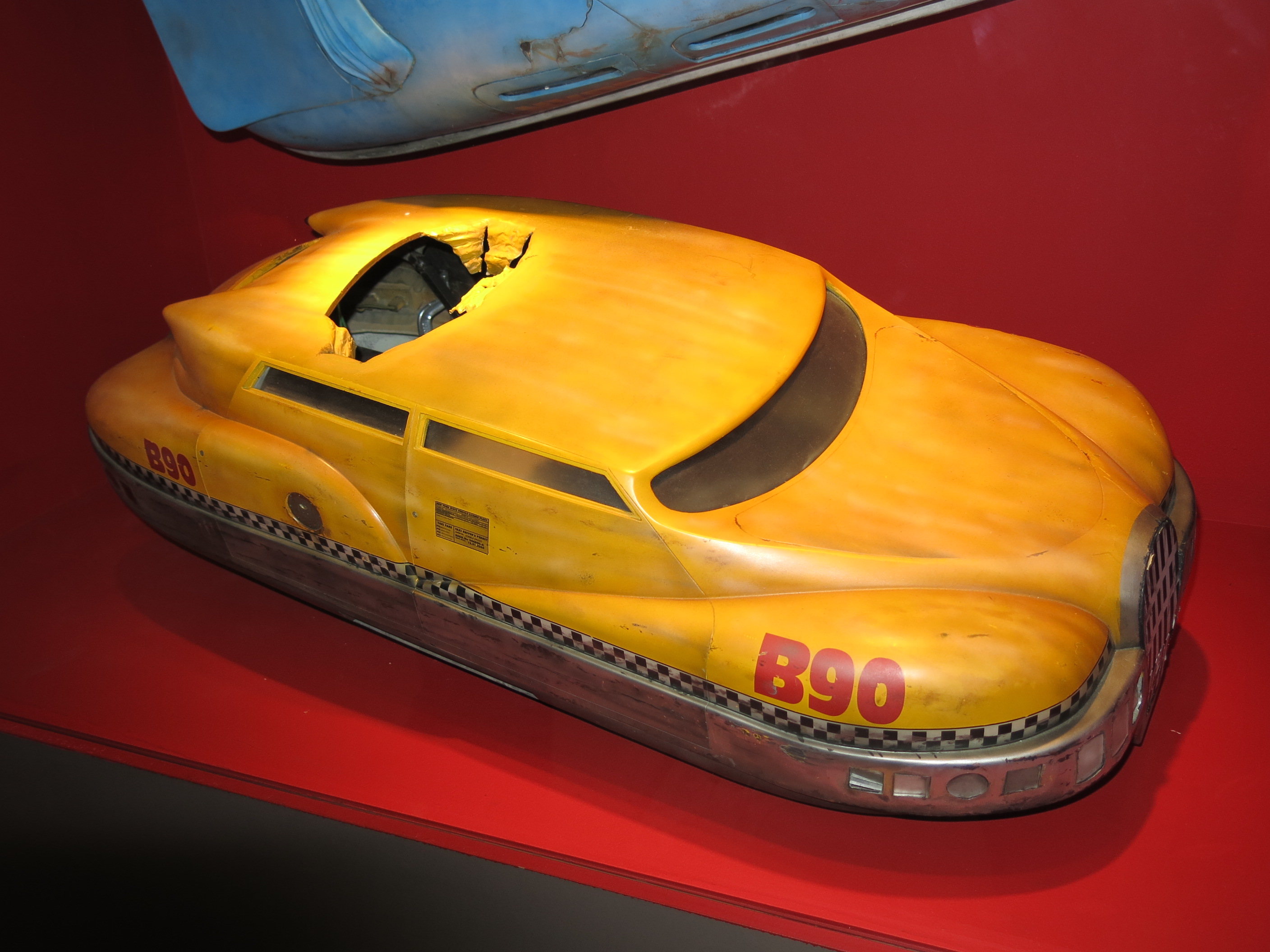
Scale model of Korben's taxi

=== Music ===
In The Fifth Element, some kind of music is playing during about 90% of the film; Besson's films have been described as "intrinsically musical". The score was composed by Éric Serra. He relies chiefly on the use of orchestral textures, such as the oboe and strings heard as the surgeons prepare to regenerate Leeloo, and the pizzicato as she is reconstructed. Serra also used many non-French influences, such as the Stalinist fanfare heard before the spaceport sequence, the reggae piece played in preparation for the flight, and the hula music that greets the passengers as they arrive in Fhloston.

More conventional scoring techniques are present in the leitmotif that first sounds when Professor Pacoli mentions the fifth element, the militaristic snares as the warship prepares to attack the dark planet, and the Mahlerian funereal piece heard when Leeloo learns about war. The music used for the taxicab chase scene, titled "Alech Taadi" by Algerian performer Khaled, did not appear on the film soundtrack but is available on Khaled's album N'ssi N'ssi.

"The Diva Dance"
A sample of Inva Mula's vocals in The Diva Dance

The Diva Dance opera performance used music from Gaetano Donizetti's Lucia di Lammermoor: "Il dolce suono", the mad scene of Act III, Scene 2. It is one of the few pieces of music in the film that is diegetic. It was sung by Albanian soprano Inva Mula. The role of Plavalaguna was played by French actress Maïwenn Le Besco. Part One (titled "Lucia di Lammermoor") and Part Two (titled "The Diva Dance") of this piece are included as separate tracks on The Fifth Element soundtrack, but are sequenced to create the effect of the entire performance seen in the film. The end of Part One blends into the beginning of Part Two, creating a smooth transition between the two tracks.

==== Soundtrack ====
Released as an album under Virgin Records, the soundtrack peaked at number 99 on the Billboard 200 and number 44 in Canada. More than 200,000 copies of the lengthy soundtrack were sold in France alone. Rodney Batdorf of AllMusic gave the album three out of five stars, stating it was "diverse and accomplished, and it is just as effective outside of the film as it is within it."

== Release and reception ==
=== Initial screening ===
The film premiered on 7 May at the 1997 Cannes Film Festival, where it was selected as the opening film. Gaumont built an area for the screening that was over 100,000 square feet (9,300 m^{2}). Guests were given a "Fifth Element" Swatch, which was used as their ticket for entry. The event included a futuristic ballet, a fashion show by Jean Paul Gaultier, and fireworks. Gaumont spent between $1 million and $3 million on the event, a record at the time. The film's North American release was handled by Sony Pictures Releasing via its Columbia Pictures label.

=== Box office ===
The film debuted at number one in France, grossing 55 million Francs ($10 million) in its opening week from 527 screens and 1.81 million admissions, setting a record opening for a French film and the second-biggest opening in the country after Independence Day. It remained at number one for seven weeks. It also opened at number one in the United States, grossing $17 million on its opening weekend and remained there the following weekend. It was a box-office success, grossing over $263 million, almost three times its budget of $90 million. About 75% of the receipts for The Fifth Element were from markets outside the United States, and it was the ninth-highest-grossing film of the year worldwide. It was the highest-grossing film at the box office in France, from 7.7 million admissions, a record it held for 16 years until the release of The Intouchables in 2011. In Germany, the film was awarded the Goldene Leinwand, a sales certification award for selling more than three million tickets at the box office.

=== Critical response ===
Critics were divided in their response to The Fifth Element. Kevin Thomas of the Los Angeles Times described the film as an "elaborate, even campy sci-fi extravaganza, which is nearly as hard to follow as last year's Mission: Impossible." He concluded, The Fifth Element was "a lot warmer, more fun, and boasts some of the most sophisticated, witty production and costume design you could ever hope to see." On the American film review At the Movies, both Roger Ebert and Gene Siskel gave the film a "thumbs up". In his separate review for the Chicago Sun-Times, Ebert gave the film three stars out of four, calling it "one of the great goofy movies" and concluding, "I would not have missed seeing this film, and I recommend it for its richness of imagery. But at 127 minutes, which seems a reasonable length, it plays long."

The film also received reviews that criticised its overblown style. Todd McCarthy of Variety wrote, "A largely misfired European attempt to make an American-style sci-fi spectacular, The Fifth Element consists of a hodgepodge of elements that don't comfortably coalesce." David Edelstein of Slate said, "It may or may not be the worst movie ever made, but it is one of the most unhinged." Bruce Willis dismissed critical reviews of the film, believing they would have no impact on the film's success.

Chris Tucker's performance as Ruby Rhod also divided critics. He was praised in the Los Angeles Times and Time; the latter called him "the summer's most outrageous special effect". Josh Winning of Total Film singled out Tucker's performance as the low point of the film, ranking it as number 20 on his 2011 list, "50 Performances That Ruined Movies".

On the review aggregator website Rotten Tomatoes, 70% of 71 critics' reviews are positive. The website's consensus reads: "Visually inventive and gleefully over the top, Luc Besson's The Fifth Element is a fantastic piece of pop sci-fi that never takes itself too seriously." Metacritic, which uses a weighted average, assigned the film a score of 52 out of 100, based on 22 critics, indicating "mixed or average" reviews. Audiences polled by CinemaScore gave the film an average grade of "B" on an A+ to F scale.

=== Plagiarism suit ===
Alejandro Jodorowsky and Jean Giraud sued Besson after the film was released, claiming The Fifth Element had plagiarised their comic The Incal. Giraud sued for 13.1 million euros for unfair competition, 9 million euros in damages and interest, and two to five per cent of the net operating revenues of the film. Jodorowsky sued for 700,000 euros. The case was dismissed in 2004 on the grounds that only "tiny fragments" of the comic had been used and Giraud had been hired by Besson to work on the film before the allegations were made.

== Adaptations ==
A novel was adapted from the screenplay of The Fifth Element, written by Terry Bisson and published by HarperPrism in 1997. Rumors arose after the film's release that it would be followed by a sequel, tentatively titled Mr. Shadow. In 2011, Besson said that he never planned a sequel and has no desire to make one.

Gaumont Multimedia commissioned developer Kalisto Entertainment to develop a video-game adaptation of The Fifth Element in 1998 for the PlayStation game console and PC. The PlayStation version generally received negative reviews, but the PC version was better received. Lauren Fielder from GameSpot described the PlayStation version as "quite possibly the worst game I've ever played". Doug Perry from IGN wrote: "Take Tomb Raider, add in Leeloo Multipass and boring puzzles, and you've got Fifth Element."

A racing game based on the film, New York Race, was released in 2001. Eurogamer gave the game 6 out of 10, concluding: "New York Race is a fun little arcade racer, which oozes style, but it's something you'll grow tired of extremely quickly and as such remains fun only in short bursts."

In September 2026, Titan Books released The Fifth Element: A Visual Retrospective, an archival reference volume edited by Patrice Girod and Arnaud Grunberg. The book documents the film's pre-production and design history, collecting concept art by Jean "Moebius" Giraud and Jean-Claude Mézières, costume photography from Jean Paul Gaultier, and the full 1996 shooting script alongside production commentary.

== Accolades ==
The Fifth Element was nominated for Best Sound Effects Editing at the 70th Academy Awards, and for Best Sound Editing at the 1998 Golden Reel Awards, but lost to Titanic in both cases. It won the BAFTA Award for Best Special Visual Effects, and the Lumière Award for Best Director. It was nominated for seven César awards, winning three: Best Director, Best Cinematography and Best Production Design. It was nominated for Film of the Year at the 1997 European Film Awards, as well as the Hugo Award for Best Dramatic Presentation, and the Satellite Award for Best Visual Effects.

Thierry Arbogast was awarded the Technical Grand Prize at the 1997 Cannes Film Festival for his work on both The Fifth Element and She's So Lovely. The film received four Saturn Award nominations: Best Science Fiction Film, Best Costume, Best Special Effects, and Best Supporting Actress for Milla Jovovich. Jovovich's fight against the Mangalores was nominated for the MTV Movie Award for Best Fight, and the actress was also nominated for Best Actress – Newcomer at the Blockbuster Entertainment Awards.

Conversely, Jovovich received a Golden Raspberry nomination for Worst Supporting Actress, and Chris Tucker was nominated for Worst New Star for his performances in both The Fifth Element and Money Talks. The film also received four nominations at the 1997 Stinkers Bad Movie Awards: Worst Picture, Worst Director, Worst Supporting Actor for Tucker, and Worst Supporting Actress for Jovovich.

Year	Event	Award	Nominee	Result
1998	Academy Awards	Best Sound Effects Editing	Mark Mangini	Nominated
1998	Blockbuster Entertainment Awards	Best Actress – Newcomer	Milla Jovovich	Nominated
1997	British Academy of Film and Television Arts	Best Special Visual Effects	Mark Stetson, Karen Goulekas, Nick Allder, Neil Corbould, Nick Dudman	Won
1997	Cannes Film Festival	Technical Grand Prize	Thierry Arbogast	Won
1998	César Award	Best Cinematography	Thierry Arbogast	Won
1998	César Award	Best Director	Luc Besson	Won
1998	César Award	Best Production Design	Dan Weil	Won
1998	César Award	Best Costume Design	Jean Paul Gaultier	Nominated
1998	César Award	Best Editing	Sylvie Landra	Nominated
1998	César Award	Best Film	Luc Besson	Nominated
1998	César Award	Best Music Written for a Film	Éric Serra	Nominated
1998	César Award	Best Sound	Daniel Brisseau	Nominated
1997	European Film Awards	Film of the Year	Patrice Ledoux	Nominated
1998	Golden Raspberry Awards	Worst Supporting Actress	Milla Jovovich	Nominated
1998	Golden Raspberry Awards	Worst New Star	Chris Tucker	Nominated
1998	Golden Reel Awards	Best Sound Editing	Mark Mangini	Nominated
1998	Hugo Awards	Best Dramatic Presentation	The Fifth Element	Nominated
1997	Lumière Awards	Best Director	Luc Besson	Won
1998	MTV Movie Awards	Best Fight	Milla Jovovich vs. Aliens	Nominated
1998	Satellite Award	Best Visual Effects	Mark Stetson	Nominated
1998	Saturn Award	Best Science Fiction Film	The Fifth Element	Nominated
1998	Saturn Award	Best Costumes	Jean Paul Gaultier	Nominated
1998	Saturn Award	Best Special Effects	Special effects team	Nominated
1998	Saturn Award	Best Supporting Actress	Milla Jovovich	Nominated
1997	Stinkers Bad Movie Awards	Worst Picture	The Fifth Element	Nominated
1997	Stinkers Bad Movie Awards	Worst Director	Luc Besson	Nominated
1997	Stinkers Bad Movie Awards	Worst Supporting Actor	Chris Tucker	Nominated
1997	Stinkers Bad Movie Awards	Worst Supporting Actress	Milla Jovovich	Nominated

== Home media ==
The original home video release of The Fifth Element took place in North America on 10 December 1997, on VHS, LaserDisc, and DVD. The original DVD presented the film in its original 2.39:1 anamorphic widescreen format, though carried no special features. The film was released in Sony's Superbit format in October 2001. In his review, Conrad Jeremy from IGN gave the picture quality of the original DVD release 9 out of 10, though awarded the Superbit version a perfect score for picture quality. Overall, the Superbit version was given 8 out of 10; the final score was brought down by the version's complete lack of special features.

An "Ultimate Edition" set of two DVDs was released on 11 January 2005. The only difference between the Superbit version and the Ultimate Edition disc one is the addition of a "fact track", which when turned on displays trivia about the film, cast, and crew as the film plays. The second disc provides various special features, focusing on visual production, special effects, fashion in the film, featurettes, and interviews with Willis, Jovovich, and Tucker, as well as featurettes on the four different alien races in the film and Diva Plavalaguna. Ian Jane of DVD Talk praised the Ultimate Edition for its special features.

The first Blu-ray release of the film on 20 June 2006 was criticised as having poor picture quality by Blu-ray standards and for its lack of special features. In what has been called "an extremely rare move", Sony responded to complaints by making a remastered Blu-ray version available, released on 17 July 2007, and also offered a replacement exchange program for customers unhappy with the original Blu-ray release. Ben Williams from Blu-ray.com stated the remastered version "absolutely" made up for the substandard initial release, and praised its high video and audio quality; however, he criticised the continued lack of special features.

The 20th-anniversary 4K remaster was released on Ultra HD Blu-ray on 11 July 2017.

== Legacy ==
The film has been described by CBS News, Rotten Tomatoes, and ComingSoon.com as a science-fiction cult classic. In 2007 the Visual Effects Society placed The Fifth Element at number 50, tied with Darby O'Gill and the Little People, on their list of the fifty most influential visual effects films of all time. In 2014 Time Out listed the film at number 42 on their "100 best sci-fi movies" list.

Film critic Mark Kermode reported that The Fifth Element was one of the most divisive films among his readers, regarded as both the best and the worst summer blockbuster of all time. Years later, Kermode recalled: "I remember very clearly being in Cannes when [The] Fifth Element was first played, and it really divided the audience." Stephen Cass of Discover ranked the film the third-best science-fiction film on subscription service Hulu, writing, "People seem to either like or loathe The Fifth Element ... Lavish visuals and entertaining performances from Bruce Willis, Milla Jovovich, and Gary Oldman make this movie worth watching." In some circles, the film has gained a "so-bad-it's-good" status; Meredith Woerner of io9 listed The Fifth Element as one of "The 20 Best Worst Science-Fiction Movies of All Time."

=== Cast comments ===
Willis spoke favourably of the film in a 1999 interview, concluding: "It was a real fun movie to make." Tucker and Jovovich also spoke favourably of both their experiences making the film and working with Besson in interviews on the Ultimate Edition DVD; Jovovich described Besson as "the first really amazing director I had worked with." Asked in a 2014 interview if he liked the film, Gary Oldman stated, "Oh no. I can't bear it." He had explained in 2011: "It was me singing for my supper because Luc had come in and partly financed [my film] Nil by Mouth."

== Bibliography ==
- Besson, Luc (1997). The Story of the Fifth Element: The Adventure and Discovery of a Film. London: Titan Books. ISBN 978-1-85286-863-5.
- Bizony, Piers (2001). Digital Domain: The Leading Edge of Visual Effects. London: Aurum Press. ISBN 978-0-8230-7928-5.
- Hanson, Matt (2005). Building Sci-Fi Moviescapes: The Science Behind the Fiction. Waltham, Massachusetts: Focal Press. ISBN 978-0-240-80772-0.
- Hayward, Susan; Powrie, Phil (2009). The Films of Luc Besson: Master of Spectacle. Manchester: Manchester University Press. ISBN 978-0-7190-7029-7.
- Mazdon, Lucy (2000). Encore Hollywood: Remaking French Cinema. London: British Film Institute. ISBN 978-0-85170-801-0.
- Mézières, Jean-Claude; Christin, Pierre (2004). "The Circles of Power". Valerian: The New Future Trilogy. Valérian: Spatio-Temporal Agent. Trans. Timothy Ryan Smith. New York: iBooks. ISBN 978-0-7434-8674-3.
