= S.C.OUT =

1992 video game

- Developer(s): Atreid Concept
- Publisher(s): Atreid Concept
- Designer(s): Mathieu Marciacq
- Artist(s): Stéphan Renaudin
- Writer(s): Tomoharu P. Hibiki, Thierry Robin, Jean Michel Ringuet
- Composer(s): Frédéric Motte, Olivier Bailly Maitre
- Platform(s): Macintosh, MS-DOS
- Release: NA: 1992
- Genre(s): Strategy game

S.C.OUT (an abbreviation for Star Clean Out) is a computer game developed and published by Atreid Concept in 1992 for Macintosh and MS-DOS.

== Plot ==
S.C.OUT is an arcade/strategy game, in which the player must reactivate a moonbase that has been taken over by aliens. The player is equipped with a variety of weaponry to fight enemies, which include entities, worms, and slimes. The player faces barriers including doors (some locked), electronic doors, L.E.D. doors, barriers that prevent movement of cargo, and armored obstacles which need to be destroyed using continuous fire. The player can discover devices to assist the mission, including electric railways and portable batteries that power the railway. The player can also find safe zones and teleporters, as well as force mirrors which can either be diagonal or four-way.

== Reception ==
The game was reviewed in 1993 in Dragon #196 by Hartley, Patricia, and Kirk Lesser in "The Role of Computers" column. The reviewers gave the game 3 out of 5 stars.
