= Nightmare Creatures =

1997 video game

- Developer: Kalisto Entertainment
- Publisher: Activision: EU: Sony Computer Entertainment Europe (PS); Gameloft (mobile)
- Producer: Nicolas Gaume
- Programmer: Eric Thommerot
- Composer: Frédéric Motte
- Platforms: PlayStation, Windows, Nintendo 64, Mobile
- Release: PlayStation: NA: 31 October 1997; EU: 15 January 1998; Microsoft Windows: NA: 11 December 1997; EU: 5 March 1998; Nintendo 64: NA: 30 November 1998; Mobile: WW: September 2003
- Genre: Survival horror
- Mode: Single-player

Nightmare Creatures is a 1997 survival horror video game developed by Kalisto Entertainment for PlayStation, Windows, and Nintendo 64. A sequel, Nightmare Creatures II, was released three years later. A mobile phone version of Nightmare Creatures was developed and published by Gameloft in 2003. A second sequel, Nightmare Creatures III: Angel of Darkness, was cancelled in 2004.

== Plot ==
The story behind Nightmare Creatures draws upon gothic horror elements of the 19th century and begins in 1666, when a devil-worshiping cult called the Brotherhood of Hecate were conducting sinister experiments in London so as to take over the city, and then the world. The Brotherhood tried to develop an elixir that would endow them with superhuman powers. However, rather than creating their intended superhumans, their experiments instead created grotesque monsters called nightmare creatures. When they decided to use these creatures as an army of conquest, one of their members, Samuel Pepys, set their headquarters on fire, resulting in the First Great Fire of London.

The game takes place in 1834 when London falls victim to several evil occurrences. Monster sightings are reported along with news of people mutating into ungodly creatures, and that the dead are waking from their graves and walking among the living. All of London is in a panic and vulnerable to the schemes of Adam Crowley (who was based on occultist Aleister Crowley), a mad scientist and occultist enlisting the help of the Brotherhood.

A book is dropped off at the home of Ignatius Blackward, a priest and occult expert. He finds it is the lost diary of Samuel Pepys, which contains the Brotherhood's research. Knowing he needs help, Ignatius sends the diary to a renowned American immunologist named Dr. Jean Franciscus of New Orleans, who shows up with his daughter, Nadia Franciscus. However, Jean was killed and the book was stolen. Ignatius and Nadia are at Jean's funeral, where they are approached by a man who gives them a note reading: "Know about Adam Crowley, Brotherhood of Hecate --- HVHJ". Ignatius and Nadia head out to an address listed on the note, hoping to seek out Crowley and neutralize the monsters.

== Gameplay ==
A single-player only game, Nightmare Creatures allows the player to control either Ignatius or Nadia. Secondary weapons such as pistols, mines, fire bombs, and magic spells can be used in addition to each character's primary weapon. The game features an adrenaline bar which causes health to be lost if it runs out, and players are forced to continuously seek out and win battles to keep the adrenaline bar full.

== Development ==
Nightmare Creatures was the first video game to be created with LibSys, Kalisto's own proprietary 3D development program. The game's environments were modeled from 19th century maps and blueprints.

== Release ==
Bidding for the game's publication rights was reportedly fierce. Initially Mindscape was slated to be the publisher, but the publication rights to Nightmare Creatures were acquired by Activision just before the 1997 Electronic Entertainment Expo. Nightmare Creatures was published by Activision in North America and Sony Computer Entertainment in Europe.

In North America the PlayStation version was promoted with a television commercial featuring a voice-over by Maurice LaMarche.

While the PlayStation and Microsoft Windows versions are essentially the same, the Nintendo 64 version saw a handful of minor changes. Given the limited storage capacity of the Nintendo 64's cartridge system, all full-motion videos were removed. Brief segments of scrolling text are used at the game's start and following each level to advance the plot. The platforming elements were made much easier in the Nintendo 64 version, and the health-depleting adrenaline meter could also be turned off in the options menu, allowing players to explore the environments at a more leisurely pace. Also graphically, the Nintendo 64 version is more crisp, clear and detailed than the PlayStation version, without the pixelization and texture-warping.

The PlayStation version was released in Japan on February 26, 1998.

== Reception ==
Reception

Aggregate score
Aggregator	Score			
Aggregator	mobile	N64	PC	PS
GameRankings	N/A	65%	51%	78%

Review scores
Publication	Score			
Publication	mobile	N64	PC	PS
AllGame	N/A	2.5/5	N/A	4/5
Computer Games Strategy Plus	N/A	N/A	2.5/5	N/A
Computer Gaming World	N/A	N/A	4/5	N/A
Edge	N/A	N/A	7/10	N/A
Electronic Gaming Monthly	N/A	4.825/10	N/A	6.625/10
Game Informer	N/A	8/10	N/A	8.75/10
GameRevolution	N/A	N/A	C+	B+
GameSpot	8.5/10	6.7/10	5.5/10	5.7/10
IGN	6.5/10	7.4/10	N/A	7.8/10
Next Generation	N/A	3/5	N/A	3/5
Nintendo Power	N/A	6.6/10	N/A	N/A
Official U.S. PlayStation Magazine	N/A	N/A	N/A	3.5/5
PC Gamer (US)	N/A	N/A	82%	N/A
Entertainment Weekly	N/A	N/A	B−	N/A
Playstation Plus	N/A	N/A	N/A	PS: 86%
Playstation Pro	N/A	N/A	N/A	9/10

Nightmare Creatures was a commercial hit, with global sales above 1.5 million units by January 2000.

The PlayStation version of Nightmare Creatures received "favorable" reviews, while the Nintendo 64 and PC versions received "mixed" reviews, according to the review aggregation website GameRankings.

The PlayStation release divided critics. They almost uniformly praised the game's spooky atmosphere and the monster designs, though many found that the controls had issues and the camera, while effective the vast majority of the time, would occasionally frustrate the player with a poor view of the action. However, they were evenly split on whether to recommend the game, with some saying that the fighting gets old quickly, making it an overall disappointment in light of the promise it showed during development, and some saying that the game's flaws are minor compared to its strengths. Next Generation stated that "While the visuals are compelling enough to drive many players forward, the repetitive action is enough to make most wait for a level select code and a weekend rental." Taking the other side, IGN concluded, "Ultimately, the positives far outweigh the negatives in Nightmare Creatures. It's spooky, challenging, and a hell of a lot of fun."

The division between recommendations stemmed at least partially from differing experiences with the game's extensive move sets. For example, GameSpot stated that "Since the more complex moves are significantly harder to pull off (especially with those attacking creatures interfering and all), you'll end up jamming on the kick or slash buttons with an occasional block or dodge." On the other side, GamePro said even the more elaborate combos "are a breeze to perform", and give the game a 4.5 out of 5 for control and a perfect 5.0 in every other category (graphics, sound, and fun factor). They summarized that "With its speedy gameplay and fast-moving enemy interaction, not to mention the intense, creepy nature of the backgrounds, Nightmare Creatures is sure to haunt your dreams for months to come." The disagreement extended between Electronic Gaming Monthly's four reviewers; Sushi-X and Kelly Rickards gave the game a 8.0 and 7.5, respectively, saying that the special attacks are all easy to perform and useful in combat, while Joe Fielder and Crispin Boyer both gave it a 5.5, with Fielder arguing that the player is driven to either button mashing or sticking to a handful of basic moves and Boyer saying the game is too difficult unless the player quickly masters the use of the block. Critics overwhelmingly agreed that the game is extremely difficult (though some of them considered this a positive rather than a negative).

Next Generation reviewed the Nintendo 64 version of the game, rating it three stars out of five, and stated that "Nightmare Creatures does grow bland after the first few levels, but the variety of items and new combos keep the game from diving into tedium. All in all, it's a welcome addition to the N64."

Entertainment Weekly gave the game a B−, praising the 3D environments, and saying Castlevania: Symphony of the Night is dated and flat in comparison.

== Film adaptation ==
On December 8, 2000, a film adaptation based on the game was announced, but never went into production.
