= Fury of the Furries =

1993 video game

- Developer: Atreid Concept
- Publisher: Mindscape
- Designer: Cyrille Fontaine
- Composer: Frédéric Motte
- Platforms: Amiga, CD32, MS-DOS, Mac
- Release: 1993: Amiga, MS-DOS; 1994: CD32, Mac
- Genre: Puzzle-platform
- Mode: Single-player

Fury of the Furries is a puzzle-platform game developed by Atreid Concept and published in 1993 by Mindscape for Amiga and MS-DOS. Versions for the CD32 and Mac followed. The game was licensed and re-themed by Namco as Pac-In-Time, replacing the characters to fit the Pac-Man franchise.

== Plot ==
A group of Tinies return to their home planet after a voyage in space. They find out that their beautiful home has been turned into a horrid place by The Wicked One, a dark and cunning Tiny with a giant fang jutting from its mouth. The player controls a Tiny, who must defeat The Wicked One, who has captured the king and turned all the Tinies into mindless monsters by using a device simply referred to as "the machine".

== Gameplay ==
The player guides a small furry, bouncy and fragile Tiny across eight regions of the land, Desert, Lagoon, Forest, Pyramids, Mountains, Factory, Village, and finally the Castle where one must defeat the Wicked One. The regions each have unique music, color schemes and styles. Each has 10 separate levels and a collection of secret bonus levels. The final stage of the game has the player entering the machine (which turns out to be a large industrial complex) and destroying it. Along the way the player must avoid various perils, such as monsters, spikes and acid.

The game's primary unique feature is Tiny's ability to transform itself into four different forms: yellow, green, red and blue. Different skills are required at different points, and not all forms are available in all levels. Particularly in levels which are primarily puzzlers, the player may encounter fields which activate and deactivate certain powers.

In its yellow form, it controls the element of fire, allowing it to shoot fireballs. In its red form, it controls the element of earth, allowing it to eat through some elements of the scenery. In its green form, it controls the element of air, allowing it to produce ropes from its hands to swing around the environment and it can also pull different objects with its rope. In its blue form, it controls the element of water, allowing the ability to dive underwater and shooting bubbles that damage hostiles.

== Reception ==
Computer Gaming World in April 1994 said that Fury of the Furries "sports an awful plot and totally unoriginal gameplay, but it has good graphics and is quite addictive ... unoriginal, bland and safe".

In 1994, PC Gamer UK named Fury of the Furries the 40th best computer game of all time. The editors called it "a must for anyone with a huge arcade appetite."

== Legacy ==
In 1994 Fury of the Furries was licensed to Namco which changed the graphics and music, and released the game as Pac-In-Time as part of the Pac-Man franchise. The MS-DOS and Macintosh versions of the game are mostly identical to the original, but with Pac-Man as the protagonist, while the SNES version is an entirely new game.

There were plans for a 3D remake in 2002 by Kalisto Entertainment, but studio went bankrupt before it could happen.
