= Dark Earth =

1997 video game

- Developer: Kalisto Entertainment
- Publisher: MicroProse
- Designer: Guillaume Le Pennec
- Programmer: Nicolas Coquard
- Artist: Frédéric Menne
- Composer: Frédéric Motte
- Platform: Windows
- Release: October 22, 1997
- Genre: action-adventure
- Mode: Single-player

Dark Earth is a post-apocalyptic adventure game with action elements, developed by Kalisto Entertainment and published by MicroProse for Microsoft Windows in 1997. Reviewers were generally positive, with critics commenting on the well thought-out story, milieu, and the impressive visuals, though the combat was criticized. It sold 500,000 copies by 1999.

== Gameplay ==
Combat in Dark Earth

Dark Earth is a third-person game centered around item-collection and weapon-based melee combat. The game world is filled with a variety of different weapons which can be used until broken, requiring a constant need to expand the main character Arkhan's weapon collection. The vast majority of the weapons are scavenged or improvised, such as kitchen knives and shivs. There are a very limited number of guns in Dark Earth, as most people have forgotten about firearms. For the select few guns Arkhan finds, there is a limited amount of ammo, making guns good for only a limited time. Arkhan must also scavenge for food, as it is his only means of healing.

As time progresses in Arkhan's quest, he slowly begins to transform into a creature of darkness. His physical appearance, the tone of his voice, and his dialog choices change throughout the course of the game. There is also an option for Arkhan to react to situations with his 'dark side' (i.e. he'll say rude things in dialog or treat his environment more aggressively while searching).

The environments of the game are all pre-rendered, with 3D modeled characters moving atop them (much like Resident Evil). This method, while allowing for more detailed environments, prevents any camera control. All locations have fixed-camera views, which can create difficulty in some fight situations in small areas.

== Story ==
=== Background ===
Dark Earth takes place several centuries in the future, when a meteor collision with Earth (referred to as the "Great Cataclysm") has thrown up great clouds of ash and dust, blocking out the light of the sun. Those not killed in the collision were soon hunted by strange creatures of darkness, and so they began to seek a refuge from the "Dark Earth" - pockets of land where the light of the sun breached the clouds. Eventually they found such places. Called "Stallites", these places of light became cities, and the survivors built temples in honor of the light. The game is set in a Stallite called Sparta.

By the time of the game, many centuries after the establishment of Sparta, most of the citizens have forgotten their history and now worship the light as a god, Solaar. The city is run by Sunseers, priests of Solaar, who maintain order and prevent the creatures of darkness from entering the city limits. The game focuses on Arkhan, a "Guardian of Fire", one of the military protectors of the city.

=== Plot ===
The game begins with Arkhan awakening from a nightmare in which he has a vision of the Great Cataclysm and sees it foretold that a great darkness will threaten Sparta, which he must fight against. He then goes to see the head of the Guardians of Fire, Provost Dhorkan, who orders him to guard the council chamber door at the Temple of Solaar, while the High Sunseer Lory is holding a meeting. On his way to the Temple, Arkhan overhears his father Rylsadhar, also a Sunseer, telling Lory that he fears a great danger is about to engulf Sparta. He gives Lory something, telling her he doesn't feel safe carrying it himself. Arkhan takes his post, but hears a commotion from within the council room. He bursts in to find the Sunseers under attack by two men, one of whom he kills. The other is about to attack Lory, but Arkhan intervenes, and the man throws something in his face and flees. Lory examines Arkhan and sees that he has been contaminated by "Shankr Archessence."

Arkhan awakens some time later, and is horrified to discover that he has begun to turn into a creature of darkness. A healer, Thanandar, tells him that he is infected with darkness and the only way to save him is a "secret energy from the dawn of time." Thanandar says that Rylsadhar is one of the few people in Sparta who knows where it is located. Arkhan goes to see Rylsadhar, who tells him he is forbidden to bring him to the secret and must break his vows as a Sunseer to do so, but only after getting approval from Dhorkan. Arkhan then sees Kalhi, his wife, who is horrified at what has happened to him and tells him that Dhorkan has taken control of the city, declared martial law, locked the gates, and sent the Guardians of Fire out to search for more attackers.

Arkhan heads to meet his father, but Rylsadhar doesn't arrive, so Arkhan sets out to look for him. He learns that Lory has gone into hiding and that his best friend, and fellow Guardian, Zed, is leading the hunt for more "heretics" in the Lower City. Arkhan then learns that Rylsadhar has disappeared, and the Guardians of Fire have arrested Kalhi. He breaks her out of jail and they head to the Lower City to see their friend, the scavenger Danrys, who tells them that they need to speak to a man named Armal Sadak, the chief scavenger. Sadak tells Arkhan that the people who attacked the Sunseers are a group of thugs known as the Konkalites who live in the sewers. However, they did so on the orders of someone else, although Sadak doesn't know who. He also recommends that Arkhan find Leona, a hermit who lives outside Sparta in the Dark Earth.

Whilst Kalhi remains with Danrys, Arkhan heads into the sewers and discovers that the Konkalites' leader, Sordos, is planning to take over the Upper City. Arkhan also learns that Sordos and Dhorkan are working together. However, Dhorkan is not the one behind the attack on the Sunseers. Sordos is in league with another Sunseer, who is behind everything. Arkhan then finds Sordos in conversation with Thanandar, who reveals he is holding Rylsadhar prisoner. Arkhan kills them both and enters the cells, finding Zed. Zed tells Arkhan that Thanandar is behind everything and seeks to find the ancient secret to destroy it and banish the light from Sparta forever. Zed then turns into a creature of darkness, and Arkhan is forced to kill him.

Arkhan returns to the Upper City to confront Dhorkan, but he flees through a secret passage in his office. Arkhan pursues him down to the Lower City, where he encounters the resurrected Thanandar. He reveals that Rylsadhar drank the Archessence that fills Thanandar's soul, and now Rylsadhar has become Thanandar's servant. Thanandar sends Rylsadhar to destroy the Well of Light at the heart of the city. Rylsadhar does so, but dies in the process. Arkhan then meets Lory, who tells him that with the destruction of the Well of Light, the walls of the city no longer protect it from the creatures of darkness. She also tells him that the city has only one chance for salvation; Rylsadhar spent many years researching the origins of the light in the Well of Light. If Arkhan can continue Rylsadhar's research, he may find a way to save the city; beneath the city is a source of unlimited light, but it is dormant and needs to be activated. Lory gives Arkhan part of the key to Rylsadhar's vault (the item Rylsadhar gave to Lory earlier on) and urges him to find a way to access the light energy.

Arkhan then sets about finding the rest of the key. He finds the first part with the city's Master Builder, Bandor, who tells him the other parts of the key are with Zed, and Leona. Arkhan finds and defeats Dhorkan, and then discovers a secret bunker from the time of the Great Cataclysm, containing hibernation pods and video files detailing how people tried to survive in the bunker after the meteor collision. He then meets a thief who is holding Zed's part of the key. Arkhan kills him and takes the key. As he moves around the city, Arkhan notes that everywhere, people are beginning to turn into creatures of darkness. He heads down into the sewers and finds Dhorkan dying in the Konkalite's prison. Dhorkan regrets his actions, realizing that he had been used by Sordos and Thanandar. He advises Arkhan not to face Thananadar, and that the poison thrown in Arkhan's face was actually Thanandar's blood. He dies, and Arkhan then discovers a secret underwater passage to outside of the city.

He soon encounters Leona. Telling her that the Well of Light has been destroyed, that Rylsadhar is dead and that Thanandar is no longer human, Leona is shocked to hear of what has happened. She reveals that the secret of the Well of Light was known only to a few, known as Initiates, and that knowledge of it goes back to the dawn of time, millennia before the Great Cataclysm. The Well contains the Force of Light, and Rylsadhar was trying to find its source in a tomb deep below the city. Leona reveals that if the source can be found, the Force of Light will destroy the Force of Darkness in Thanandar, who, like Lory, Rylsadhar, Zed and Leona was an Initiate. She then gives him the final part of the key to Rylsadhar's vault. Arkhan heads back to the city, finding dead Guardians everywhere. A dying Guardian reveals that the creatures of darkness have entered Sparta.

Arkhan enters Rylsadhar's vault and finds research on how to gain access to the Runka Tomb, the source of the Well of Light. Rylsadhar had discovered how to enter the tomb, but had been unable to find the door. However, using an explosive substance found in the bunker, Akhan is able to find the door, which was hidden in the center of the city. Now almost completely transformed into a creature of darkness, he enters the tomb. Navigating a series of traps, he reaches the center of the tomb, but realizes he has been followed by Thanandar, now transformed into a monster of darkness. Thanandar attempts to destroy the source of Light, but Arkhan blocks him. They fight, and Arkhan is able to defeat and destroy Thanandar. Arkhan then enters the source, which tells him it is time for the "Great Awakening" as a tower of light shoots into the sky high above the city, banishing the Darkness.

== Development ==
The game was in development for two years. Most of the work on the game was done at Mindscape's development house in Bordeaux, France. The characters' facial models were assembled from various parts (e.g. eyes, cheekbones) chosen from a collective character database, rather than being created from a single model.

Kalisto's plans for a sequel to Dark Earth never came to fruition, although they did produce, in partnership with French publisher Multisim, a tabletop role-playing game based on the Dark Earth world.

Although both Sony and Konami expressed publishing interest, a PlayStation 2 port of Dark Earth was canceled early in development.

== Reception ==
=== Sales ===
Dark Earth sold 500,000 units globally by mid-1999. However, it failed commercially in the United States, where its sales totaled 54,200 units by April 1999. Microprose's Tom Nichols blamed this performance on competition from The Curse of Monkey Island and Blade Runner, which he said drew retailers away from stocking Dark Earth and customers away from buying it. He also noted that "we signed the game late in its development, so we didn't have enough time to build the pre-awareness and hype that you need to have in order to be successful today".

=== Reviews and awards ===
Reception

Aggregate score
Aggregator	Score
GameRankings	71%

Review scores
Publication	Score
GameRevolution	B+
GameSpot	8/10
Next Generation	3/5
PC Zone	82/100
PC Gameworld	70/100

Dark Earth received generally positive reviews, and held an aggregate score of 71% on GameRankings. It was named the best adventure game of 1997 by CNET Gamecenter, whose editors called it "beautifully conceived and executed" and an example of how "a superior adventure game is made". The game was also a finalist for the Software Publishers Association's 1997 "Best Adventure/Role-Playing Software Game" Codie award, which it ultimately lost to Diablo.

Critics generally saw the game's story as its strongest asset. Next Generation, for example, commented that "An adventure's worth is in the story, and Dark Earth's is impressively thought-out and deep. Kalisto's designers were very careful to create an internally consistent world, from history to environment. Thus, the milieu of the Stalite dominion is rich in detail without resorting to needless exposition." PC Zone's Chris Anderson opined that despite considerable flaws in the game's cinematic production, "the rich storyline alone will be enough to keep most people happy, and with the added diversions of hand-to-hand fisticuffs and puzzle-solving elements, Dark Earth offers a well-rounded gameplay experience that should appeal to many gamers who wouldn't normally be attracted to the adventure genre."

The combat was more negatively received, with most critics finding it clunky and frustrating due to the minimal control over the player character. The use of fixed camera angles was also criticized as causing frustrations with both the combat and the puzzle solving, but the graphics were a subject of overall praise for most reviewers due to elements such as the distinctive character models, gorgeous environments, and impressive effects. GameSpot's Jeff Sengstack, although he was critical of the fixed camera angles, wrote that "Dark Earth features superb graphics, outstanding 3D character animation, and unique action-adventuring in one beautifully crafted package. Adventurers longing for a deep and rich story, with carefully crafted characters, coupled with swashbuckling fighting action and challenging puzzles and problem solving, look no further." Game Revolution's Thomas Garcia also noted that the fact that the game has low system requirements without sacrificing impressive visuals makes it especially appealing to people with slow PC setups.

GamePro gave it a 4.5 out of 5 in graphics, sound, and funfactor, and a 3.5 in control, concluding, "Dark Earth doesn't push any envelopes - in fact, it doesn't even overcome the common pitfalls of its genre - but the engaging plot proves well worth the effort." Next Generation similarly commented that Dark Earth was one of the better adventure games on the market, but that it retained the usual limitations of the genre.
