= Kalisto Entertainment =

French video game developer

Kalisto Entertainment SA
- Formerly: Atreid Concept (1990–1995); Mindscape Bordeaux (1995–1996); Kalisto Entertainment (1996–2000)
- Industry: Video games
- Founded: October 1990
- Defunct: 2002
- Key people: Nicolas Gaume (founder & CEO)
- Number of employees: ~350 in 2001
- Parent: Mindscape (1993–1996)

Kalisto Entertainment was a French video game development company founded by Nicolas Gaume at age 19. They are mostly known for developing Fury of the Furries and the Nightmare Creatures series.

The company began as Atreid Concept in 1990 and later created the distribution label Kalisto in 1992, which became Kalisto Entertainment's namesake. In late 1993, Atreid Concept became part of Mindscape Inc. as Mindscape Bordeaux. Nicolas Gaume bought Mindscape Bordeaux back in 1996, and renamed the company Kalisto Entertainment. In 2000, it expanded operations when the company acquired Texas-based developer Daylight Productions, and renamed itself to Kalisto Entertainment USA.

Kalisto Entertainment declared bankruptcy in 2002 (same time as the Dot-com bubble), and company officials were found without fault by a criminal court in 2006. Employers of the U.S. office went on to start up a new company Big Sky Interactive, which was later blacklisted by THQ and later shut down in 2003. Civil trials are still under way. Nicolas Gaume was condemned to pay 200,000 euros by the French Stock Market Authority for repeated misinformation of his stockholders.

== Games ==
- S.C.OUT (1992)
- Cogito (1992)
- Fury of the Furries (1993)
- Pac-In-Time (1994)
- Savage Warriors (1995)
- Al Unser Jr. Arcade Racing (1995)
- Dark Earth (1997)
- Nightmare Creatures (1997)
- Ultimate Race Pro (1998)
- The Fifth Element (1998)
- Nightmare Creatures II (2000)
- 4 Wheel Thunder (2000)
- New York Race (2001)
- Lucky Luke: Western Fever (2001)

=== Cancelled ===
- Highlander: The Gathering (trailer title)
- Nightmare Creatures III: Angel of Darkness
- Super Farm (sold to Asobo Studio)
- Fury of the Furries 3D
